= List of weekly top ten UK singles chart singles of the 2020s =

The UK Singles Chart is a weekly record chart compiled by the Official Charts Company (OCC) on behalf of the British record industry. The chart week runs from Friday to Thursday with the chart date given as the following Thursday.

Audio streaming data was incorporated into the chart in 2014, with 100 streams equivalent to one sale. In 2017, the OCC introduced an exception for songs that had spent a certain time on the charts and whose consumption had declined, whereby these songs are calculated at a rate of 300 streams equivalent to a sale.

Starting from 3 January 2020, the following singles have all been in the top ten of the UK Singles Chart.

== 2020 ==
Key
No.	Song's position on the UK Singles Chart at the time
New	A single's first time on the top ten

No.	Previous week pos.	Artist (Note: The artist, single, peak position, and number of weeks of reaching the top ten the charts are those given by the Official Charts Company.)	Single	Record label (Note: The record labels are those given by the OCC.)	Peak position	Weeks on chart
3-9 January
1	5	Stormzy featuring Ed Sheeran and Burna Boy	"Own It"	Atlantic/Merky	1	6
2	12	Lewis Capaldi	"Before You Go"	EMI	2	7
3	14	Dua Lipa	"Don't Start Now"	Warner Records	2	9
4	16	Arizona Zervas	"Roxanne"	Sony Music	4	9
5	20	Tones & I	"Dance Monkey"	Parlophone	1	22
6	23	Billie Eilish	"Everything I Wanted"	Interscope	3	7
7	26	Harry Styles	"Adore You"	Columbia	7	4
8	36	Endor	"Pump It Up"	Defected	8	12
9	44	Jax Jones featuring Ella Henderson	"This Is Real"	Polydor	9	15
10	43	Selena Gomez	"Lose You to Love Me"	Interscope	3	11
10-16 January
1	1	Stormzy featuring Ed Sheeran and Burna Boy	"Own It"	Atlantic/Merky	1	7
2	2	Lewis Capaldi	"Before You Go"	EMI	2	8
3	3	Dua Lipa	"Don't Start Now"	Warner Records	2	10
4	4	Arizona Zervas	"Roxanne"	Sony Music	4	10
5	New	Justin Bieber	"Yummy"	Def Jam	5	1
6	5	Tones & I	"Dance Monkey"	Parlophone	1	23
7	15	Lewis Capaldi	"Someone You Loved"	EMI	1	54
8	6	Billie Eilish	"Everything I Wanted"	Interscope	3	8
9	7	Harry Styles	"Adore You"	Columbia	7	5
10	11	The Weeknd	"Blinding Lights"	Republic Records	10	5
17-23 January
1	1	Stormzy featuring Ed Sheeran and Burna Boy	"Own It"	Atlantic/Merky	1	8
2	2	Lewis Capaldi	"Before You Go"	EMI	2	9
3	New	Future featuring Drake	"Life Is Good"	Cash Money/Republic/RCA	3	1
4	3	Dua Lipa	"Don't Start Now"	Warner Records	2	11
5	16	Roddy Ricch	"The Box"	Atlantic	5	4
6	4	Arizona Zervas	"Roxanne"	Sony Music	4	11
7	7	Lewis Capaldi	"Someone You Loved"	EMI	1	55
8	10	The Weeknd	"Blinding Lights"	Republic Records	8	6
9	5	Justin Bieber	"Yummy"	Def Jam	5	2
10	6	Tones & I	"Dance Monkey"	Parlophone	1	24
24-30 January
1	New	Eminem featuring Juice Wrld	"Godzilla"	Interscope	1	1
2	5	Roddy Ricch	"The Box"	Atlantic	2	5
3	1	Stormzy featuring Ed Sheeran and Burna Boy	"Own It"	Atlantic/Merky	1	9
4	8	The Weeknd	"Blinding Lights"	Republic Records	4	8
5	2	Lewis Capaldi	"Before You Go"	EMI	2	10
6	3	Future featuring Drake	"Life Is Good"	Cash Money/Republic/RCA	3	2
7	4	Dua Lipa	"Don't Start Now"	Warner Records	2	12
8	6	Arizona Zervas	"Roxanne"	Sony Music	4	12
9	New	DigDat featuring Aitch	"Ei8ht Mile"	Columbia/Since 93	9	1
10	7	Lewis Capaldi	"Someone You Loved"	EMI	1	56
31 January-6 February
1	5	Lewis Capaldi	"Before You Go"	EMI	1	11
2	4	The Weeknd	"Blinding Lights"	Republic Records	2	9
3	2	Roddy Ricch	"The Box"	Atlantic	2	6
4	1	Eminem featuring Juice Wrld	"Godzilla"	Interscope	1	2
5	3	Stormzy featuring Ed Sheeran and Burna Boy	"Own It"	Atlantic/Merky	1	10
6	7	Dua Lipa	"Don't Start Now"	Warner Records	2	13
7	6	Future featuring Drake	"Life Is Good"	Cash Money/Republic/RCA	3	3
8	11	Billie Eilish	"Everything I Wanted"	Interscope	3	11
9	10	Lewis Capaldi	"Someone You Loved"	EMI	1	57
10	8	Arizona Zervas	"Roxanne"	Sony Music	4	13
7-13 February
1	2	The Weeknd	"Blinding Lights"	Republic Records	1	10
2	3	Roddy Ricch	"The Box"	Atlantic	2	7
3	1	Lewis Capaldi	"Before You Go"	EMI	1	12
4	6	Dua Lipa	"Don't Start Now"	Warner Records	2	14
5	4	Eminem featuring Juice Wrld	"Godzilla"	Interscope	1	3
6	9	Lewis Capaldi	"Someone You Loved"	EMI	1	58
7	8	Billie Eilish	"Everything I Wanted"	Interscope	3	12
8	7	Future featuring Drake	"Life Is Good"	Cash Money/Republic/RCA	3	4
9	10	Arizona Zervas	"Roxanne"	Sony Music	4	14
10	14	Harry Styles	"Adore You"	Columbia	7	9
14-20 February
1	1	The Weeknd	"Blinding Lights"	Republic Records	1	11
2	2	Roddy Ricch	"The Box"	Atlantic	2	8
3	3	Lewis Capaldi	"Before You Go"	EMI	1	13
4	4	Dua Lipa	"Don't Start Now"	Warner Records	2	15
5	5	Eminem featuring Juice Wrld	"Godzilla"	Interscope	1	4
6	8	Future featuring Drake	"Life Is Good"	Cash Money/Republic/RCA	3	5
7	6	Lewis Capaldi	"Someone You Loved"	EMI	1	59
8	21	Saint Jhn	"Roses"	B1/Effective/Hitco/Ministry	8	6
9	7	Billie Eilish	"Everything I Wanted"	Interscope	3	13
10	10	Harry Styles	"Adore You"	Columbia	7	10
21-27 February
1	New	Billie Eilish	"No Time to Die"	Interscope	1	1
2	1	The Weeknd	"Blinding Lights"	Republic Records	1	12
3	2	Roddy Ricch	"The Box"	Atlantic	2	9
4	3	Lewis Capaldi	"Before You Go"	EMI	1	14
5	4	Dua Lipa	"Don't Start Now"	Warner Records	2	16
6	7	Lewis Capaldi	"Someone You Loved"	EMI	1	60
7	8	Saint Jhn	"Roses"	B1/Effective/Hitco/Ministry	7	7
8	6	Future featuring Drake	"Life Is Good"	Cash Money/Republic/RCA	3	6
9	9	Billie Eilish	"Everything I Wanted"	Interscope	3	14
10	14	Justin Bieber featuring Quavo	"Intentions"	Def Jam	10	2
28 February-5 March
1	2	The Weeknd	"Blinding Lights"	Republic Records	1	13
2	1	Billie Eilish	"No Time to Die"	Interscope	1	2
3	3	Roddy Ricch	"The Box"	Atlantic	2	10
4	7	Saint Jhn	"Roses"	B1/Effective/Hitco/Ministry	4	8
5	5	Dua Lipa	"Don't Start Now"	Warner Records	2	17
6	6	Lewis Capaldi	"Someone You Loved"	EMI	1	61
7	8	Future featuring Drake	"Life Is Good"	Cash Money/Republic/RCA	3	7
8	14	Joel Corry	"Lonely"	Asylum/Perfect Havoc	8	5
9	10	Justin Bieber featuring Quavo	"Intentions"	Def Jam	9	3
10	13	Harry Styles	"Adore You"	Columbia	7	12
6-12 March
1	2	The Weeknd	"Blinding Lights"	Republic Records	1	14
2	4	Saint Jhn	"Roses"	B1/Effective/Hitco/Ministry	2	9
3	3	Roddy Ricch	"The Box"	Atlantic	2	11
4	2	Billie Eilish	"No Time to Die"	Interscope	1	3
5	New	Lady Gaga	"Stupid Love"	Interscope	5	1
6	5	Dua Lipa	"Don't Start Now"	Warner Records	2	18
7	8	Joel Corry	"Lonely"	Asylum/Perfect Havoc	7	6
8	6	Lewis Capaldi	"Someone You Loved"	EMI	1	62
9	9	Justin Bieber featuring Quavo	"Intentions"	Def Jam	9	4
10	19	Doja Cat	"Say So"	Ministry of Sound	10	10
13-19 March
1	1	The Weeknd	"Blinding Lights"	Republic Records	1	15
2	2	Saint Jhn	"Roses"	B1/Effective/Hitco/Ministry	2	10
3	New	Aitch and AJ Tracey featuring Tay Keith	"Rain"	NQ	3	1
4	3	Roddy Ricch	"The Box"	Atlantic	2	12
5	6	Dua Lipa	"Don't Start Now"	Warner Records	2	19
6	4	Billie Eilish	"No Time to Die"	Interscope	1	4
7	7	Joel Corry	"Lonely"	Asylum/Perfect Havoc	7	7
8	13	Dua Lipa	"Physical"	Warner Records	8	6
9	10	Doja Cat	"Say So"	Ministry of Sound	9	11
10	8	Lewis Capaldi	"Someone You Loved"	EMI	1	63
20-26 March
1	2	Saint Jhn	"Roses"	B1/Effective/Hitco/Ministry	1	11
2	1	The Weeknd	"Blinding Lights"	Republic Records	1	16
3	3	Aitch and AJ Tracey featuring Tay Keith	"Rain"	NQ	3	2
4	4	Roddy Ricch	"The Box"	Atlantic	2	13
5	7	Joel Corry	"Lonely"	Asylum/Perfect Havoc	5	8
6	5	Dua Lipa	"Don't Start Now"	Warner Records	2	20
7	8	Dua Lipa	"Physical"	Warner Records	7	7
8	9	Doja Cat	"Say So"	Ministry of Sound	8	12
10	11	Justin Bieber featuring Quavo	"Intentions"	Def Jam	9	6
27 March-2 April
1	1	Saint Jhn	"Roses"	B1/Effective/Hitco/Ministry	1	12
2	2	The Weeknd	"Blinding Lights"	Republic Records	1	17
3	4	Roddy Ricch	"The Box"	Atlantic	2	14
4	5	Joel Corry	"Lonely"	Asylum/Perfect Havoc	4	9
5	7	Dua Lipa	"Physical"	Warner Records	5	8
6	6	Dua Lipa	"Don't Start Now"	Warner Records	2	21
7	8	Doja Cat	"Say So"	Ministry of Sound	7	13
8	3	Aitch and AJ Tracey featuring Tay Keith	"Rain"	NQ	3	3
9	10	Justin Bieber featuring Quavo	"Intentions"	Def Jam	9	7
10	9	Eminem featuring Juice Wrld	"Godzilla"	Interscope	1	10
3-9 April
1	2	The Weeknd	"Blinding Lights"	Republic Records	1	18
2	1	Saint Jhn	"Roses"	B1/Effective/Hitco/Ministry	1	13
3	5	Dua Lipa	"Physical"	Warner Records	3	9
4	6	Dua Lipa	"Don't Start Now"	Warner Records	2	22
5	4	Joel Corry	"Lonely"	Asylum/Perfect Havoc	4	10
6	New	Dua Lipa	"Break My Heart"	Warner Records	6	1
7	7	Doja Cat	"Say So"	Ministry of Sound	7	14
8	9	Justin Bieber featuring Quavo	"Intentions"	Def Jam	8	8
9	New	Little Mix	"Break Up Song"	RCA	9	1
10	11	Mabel	"Boyfriend"	Polydor	10	5
10-16 April
1	1	The Weeknd	"Blinding Lights"	Republic Records	1	19
2	New	Drake	"Toosie Slide"	OVO/Republic Records	2	1
3	2	Saint Jhn	"Roses"	B1/Effective/Hitco/Ministry	1	14
4	3	Dua Lipa	"Physical"	Warner Records	3	10
5	4	Dua Lipa	"Don't Start Now"	Warner Records	2	23
6	5	Joel Corry	"Lonely"	Asylum/Perfect Havoc	4	11
7	6	Dua Lipa	"Break My Heart"	Warner Records	6	2
8	14	Powfu featuring Beabadoobee	"Death Bed (Coffee for Your Head)"	RCA/Robots + Humans	8	8
9	7	Doja Cat	"Say So"	Ministry of Sound	7	15
10	10	Mabel	"Boyfriend"	Polydor	10	6
17-23 April
1	1	The Weeknd	"Blinding Lights"	Republic Records	1	20
2	3	Saint Jhn	"Roses"	B1/Effective/Hitco/Ministry	1	15
3	2	Drake	"Toosie Slide"	OVO/Republic Records	2	2
4	4	Dua Lipa	"Physical"	Warner Records	3	11
5	5	Dua Lipa	"Don't Start Now"	Warner Records	2	24
6	6	Joel Corry	"Lonely"	Asylum/Perfect Havoc	4	12
7	8	Powfu featuring Beabadoobee	"Death Bed (Coffee for Your Head)"	RCA/Robots + Humans	7	9
8	9	Doja Cat	"Say So"	Ministry of Sound	7	16
9	11	Lil Mosey	"Blueberry Faygo"	Interscope	9	10
10	7	Dua Lipa	"Break My Heart"	Warner Records	6	3
24-30 April
1	New	Michael Ball and Captain Tom Moore	"You'll Never Walk Alone"	Decca	1	1
2	1	The Weeknd	"Blinding Lights"	Republic Records	1	21
3	2	Saint Jhn	"Roses"	B1/Effective/Hitco/Ministry	1	16
4	3	Drake	"Toosie Slide"	OVO/Republic Records	2	3
5	New	Live Lounge Allstars	"Times Like These"	Atlparwar/Columbia/Islpolvirg	5	1
6	4	Dua Lipa	"Physical"	Warner Records	3	12
7	7	Powfu featuring Beabadoobee	"Death Bed (Coffee for Your Head)"	RCA/Robots + Humans	7	10
8	5	Dua Lipa	"Don't Start Now"	Warner Records	2	25
9	8	Doja Cat	"Say So"	Ministry of Sound	7	17
10	6	Joel Corry	"Lonely"	Asylum/Perfect Havoc	4	13
1-7 May
1	5	Live Lounge Allstars	"Times Like These"	Atlparwar/Columbia/Islpolvirg	1	2
2	2	The Weeknd	"Blinding Lights"	Republic Records	1	22
3	3	Saint Jhn	"Roses"	B1/Effective/Hitco/Ministry	1	17
4	4	Drake	"Toosie Slide"	OVO/Republic Records	2	4
5	7	Powfu featuring Beabadoobee	"Death Bed (Coffee for Your Head)"	RCA/Robots + Humans	5	11
6	New	KSI featuring Swarmz and Tion Wayne	"Houdini"	BMG	6	1
7	6	Dua Lipa	"Physical"	Warner Records	3	13
8	10	Joel Corry	"Lonely"	Asylum/Perfect Havoc	4	14
9	8	Dua Lipa	"Don't Start Now"	Warner Records	2	26
10	9	Doja Cat	"Say So"	Ministry of Sound	7	18
8-14 May
1	4	Drake	"Toosie Slide"	OVO/Republic Records	1	5
2	10	Doja Cat	"Say So"	Ministry of Sound	2	19
3	22	Megan Thee Stallion	"Savage"	300 Entertainment/RCA	3	7
4	5	Powfu featuring Beabadoobee	"Death Bed (Coffee for Your Head)"	RCA/Robots + Humans	4	12
5	2	The Weeknd	"Blinding Lights"	Republic Records	1	23
6	27	DaBaby featuring Roddy Ricch	"Rockstar"	Interscope	6	3
7	13	S1mba featuring DTG	"Rover"	Parlophone	7	5
8	New	AJ Tracey featuring MoStack	"Dinner Guest"	AJ Tracey	8	1
9	1	Live Lounge Allstars	"Times Like These"	Atlparwar/Columbia/Islpolvirg	1	3
10	New	Drake featuring Giveon	"Chicago Freestyle"	OVO/Republic Records	10	1
15-21 May
1	6	DaBaby featuring Roddy Ricch	"Rockstar"	Interscope	1	4
2	1	Drake	"Toosie Slide"	OVO/Republic Records	1	6
3	2	Doja Cat	"Say So"	Ministry of Sound	2	20
4	New	Ariana Grande and Justin Bieber	"Stuck With U"	Def Jam/Republic Records	4	1
5	4	Powfu featuring Beabadoobee	"Death Bed (Coffee for Your Head)"	RCA/Robots + Humans	4	13
6	New	6ix9ine	"Gooba"	Scumgang	6	1
7	5	The Weeknd	"Blinding Lights"	Republic Records	1	24
8	7	S1mba featuring DTG	"Rover"	Parlophone	7	6
9	3	Megan Thee Stallion	"Savage"	300 Entertainment/RCA	3	8
10	8	AJ Tracey featuring MoStack	"Dinner Guest"	AJ Tracey	8	2
22-28 May
1	1	DaBaby featuring Roddy Ricch	"Rockstar"	Interscope	1	5
2	3	Doja Cat	"Say So"	Ministry of Sound	2	21
3	2	Drake	"Toosie Slide"	OVO/Republic Records	1	7
4	8	S1mba featuring DTG	"Rover"	Parlophone	4	7
5	5	Powfu featuring Beabadoobee	"Death Bed (Coffee for Your Head)"	RCA/Robots + Humans	4	14
6	9	Megan Thee Stallion	"Savage"	300 Entertainment/RCA	3	9
7	7	The Weeknd	"Blinding Lights"	Republic Records	1	25
8	4	Ariana Grande and Justin Bieber	"Stuck With U"	Def Jam/Republic Records	4	2
9	10	AJ Tracey featuring MoStack	"Dinner Guest"	AJ Tracey	8	3
10	6	6ix9ine	"Gooba"	Scumgang	6	2
29 May-4 June
1	New	Lady Gaga and Ariana Grande	"Rain on Me"	Interscope	1	1
2	1	DaBaby featuring Roddy Ricch	"Rockstar"	Interscope	1	6
3	4	S1mba featuring DTG	"Rover"	Parlophone	3	8
4	2	Doja Cat	"Say So"	Ministry of Sound	2	22
5	5	Powfu featuring Beabadoobee	"Death Bed (Coffee for Your Head)"	RCA/Robots + Humans	4	15
6	3	Drake	"Toosie Slide"	OVO/Republic Records	1	8
7	6	Megan Thee Stallion	"Savage"	300 Entertainment/RCA	3	10
8	9	AJ Tracey featuring MoStack	"Dinner Guest"	AJ Tracey	8	4
9	7	The Weeknd	"Blinding Lights"	Republic Records	1	26
10	8	Ariana Grande and Justin Bieber	"Stuck With U"	Def Jam/Republic Records	4	3
5-11 June
1	2	DaBaby featuring Roddy Ricch	"Rockstar"	Interscope	1	7
2	1	Lady Gaga and Ariana Grande	"Rain on Me"	Interscope	1	2
3	3	S1mba featuring DTG	"Rover"	Parlophone	3	9
4	6	Drake	"Toosie Slide"	OVO/Republic Records	1	9
5	11	Topic featuring A7S	"Breaking Me"	Positiva	5	8
6	5	Powfu featuring Beabadoobee	"Death Bed (Coffee for Your Head)"	RCA/Robots + Humans	4	16
7	New	Tion Wayne featuring Dutchavelli and Stormzy	"I Dunno"	Atlantic	7	1
8	8	AJ Tracey featuring MoStack	"Dinner Guest"	AJ Tracey	8	5
9	4	Doja Cat	"Say So"	Ministry of Sound	2	23
10	7	Megan Thee Stallion	"Savage"	300 Entertainment/RCA	3	11
12-18 June
1	1	DaBaby featuring Roddy Ricch	"Rockstar"	Interscope	1	8
2	2	Lady Gaga and Ariana Grande	"Rain on Me"	Interscope	1	3
3	3	S1mba featuring DTG	"Rover"	Parlophone	3	10
4	5	Topic featuring A7S	"Breaking Me"	Positiva	4	9
5	6	Powfu featuring Beabadoobee	"Death Bed (Coffee for Your Head)"	RCA/Robots + Humans	4	17
6	8	AJ Tracey featuring MoStack	"Dinner Guest"	AJ Tracey	6	6
7	4	Drake	"Toosie Slide"	OVO/Republic Records	1	10
8	10	Megan Thee Stallion	"Savage"	300 Entertainment/RCA	3	12
9	7	Tion Wayne featuring Dutchavelli and Stormzy	"I Dunno"	Atlantic	7	2
10	11	The Weeknd	"Blinding Lights"	Republic Records	1	28
19-25 June
1	1	DaBaby featuring Roddy Ricch	"Rockstar"	Interscope	1	9
2	2	Lady Gaga and Ariana Grande	"Rain on Me"	Interscope	1	4
3	3	S1mba featuring DTG	"Rover"	Parlophone	3	11
4	4	Topic featuring A7S	"Breaking Me"	Positiva	4	10
5	6	AJ Tracey featuring MoStack	"Dinner Guest"	AJ Tracey	5	7
6	8	Megan Thee Stallion	"Savage"	300 Entertainment/RCA	3	13
7	7	Drake	"Toosie Slide"	OVO/Republic Records	1	11
8	12	Regard and Raye	"Secrets"	Ministry of Sound	8	8
9	9	Tion Wayne featuring Dutchavelli and Stormzy	"I Dunno"	Atlantic	7	3
10	13	220 Kid and Gracey	"Don't Need Love"	Polydor	10	13
26 June-2 July
1	1	DaBaby featuring Roddy Ricch	"Rockstar"	Interscope	1	10
2	2	Lady Gaga and Ariana Grande	"Rain on Me"	Interscope	1	5
3	4	Topic featuring A7S	"Breaking Me"	Positiva	3	11
4	22	Jawsh 685 and Jason Derulo	"Savage Love (Laxed – Siren Beat)"	RCA	4	2
5	3	S1mba featuring DTG	"Rover"	Parlophone	3	12
6	5	AJ Tracey featuring MoStack	"Dinner Guest"	AJ Tracey	5	8
7	11	Harry Styles	"Watermelon Sugar"	Columbia	7	20
8	6	Megan Thee Stallion	"Savage"	300 Entertainment/RCA	3	14
9	10	220 Kid and Gracey	"Don't Need Love"	Polydor	9	14
10	8	Regard and Raye	"Secrets"	Ministry of Sound	8	9
3-9 July
1	4	Jawsh 685 and Jason Derulo	"Savage Love (Laxed – Siren Beat)"	RCA	1	3
2	1	DaBaby featuring Roddy Ricch	"Rockstar"	Interscope	1	11
3	2	Lady Gaga and Ariana Grande	"Rain on Me"	Interscope	1	6
4	3	Topic featuring A7S	"Breaking Me"	Positiva	3	12
5	5	S1mba featuring DTG	"Rover"	Parlophone	3	13
6	7	Harry Styles	"Watermelon Sugar"	Columbia	6	21
7	10	Regard and Raye	"Secrets"	Ministry of Sound	7	10
8	6	AJ Tracey featuring MoStack	"Dinner Guest"	AJ Tracey	5	9
9	9	220 Kid and Gracey	"Don't Need Love"	Polydor	9	15
10	8	Megan Thee Stallion	"Savage"	300 Entertainment/RCA	3	15
10-16 July
1	1	Jawsh 685 and Jason Derulo	"Savage Love (Laxed – Siren Beat)"	RCA	1	4
2	2	DaBaby featuring Roddy Ricch	"Rockstar"	Interscope	1	12
3	3	Lady Gaga and Ariana Grande	"Rain on Me"	Interscope	1	7
4	4	Topic featuring A7S	"Breaking Me"	Positiva	3	13
5	5	S1mba featuring DTG	"Rover"	Parlophone	3	14
6	6	Harry Styles	"Watermelon Sugar"	Columbia	6	22
7	New	AJ Tracey and Mabel	"West Ten"	AJ Tracey	7	1
8	8	AJ Tracey featuring MoStack	"Dinner Guest"	AJ Tracey	5	10
9	New	Pop Smoke featuring 50 Cent and Roddy Ricch	"The Woo"	Republic Records	9	1
10	7	Regard and Raye	"Secrets"	Ministry of Sound	7	11
17-23 July
1	1	Jawsh 685 and Jason Derulo	"Savage Love (Laxed – Siren Beat)"	RCA	1	5
2	2	DaBaby featuring Roddy Ricch	"Rockstar"	Interscope	1	13
3	15	Joel Corry featuring MNEK	"Head & Heart"	Asylum/Perfect Havoc	3	2
4	3	Lady Gaga and Ariana Grande	"Rain on Me"	Interscope	1	8
5	4	Topic featuring A7S	"Breaking Me"	Positiva	3	14
6	6	Harry Styles	"Watermelon Sugar"	Columbia	6	23
7	7	AJ Tracey and Mabel	"West Ten"	AJ Tracey	7	2
8	10	Regard and Raye	"Secrets"	Ministry of Sound	7	12
9	New	Juice Wrld and Marshmello	"Come & Go"	Interscope	9	1
10	8	AJ Tracey featuring MoStack	"Dinner Guest"	AJ Tracey	5	11
24-30 July
1	3	Joel Corry featuring MNEK	"Head & Heart"	Asylum/Perfect Havoc	1	3
2	1	Jawsh 685 and Jason Derulo	"Savage Love (Laxed – Siren Beat)"	RCA	1	6
3	2	DaBaby featuring Roddy Ricch	"Rockstar"	Interscope	1	14
4	4	Lady Gaga and Ariana Grande	"Rain on Me"	Interscope	1	9
5	6	Harry Styles	"Watermelon Sugar"	Columbia	5	24
6	7	AJ Tracey and Mabel	"West Ten"	AJ Tracey	6	3
7	8	Regard and Raye	"Secrets"	Ministry of Sound	7	13
8	New	DJ Khaled featuring Drake	"Greece"	Black Butter/OVO/Republic	8	1
9	New	Headie One and Drake	"Only You Freestyle"	Relentless	9	1
10	10	AJ Tracey featuring MoStack	"Dinner Guest"	AJ Tracey	5	12
31 July-6 August
1	1	Joel Corry featuring MNEK	"Head & Heart"	Asylum/Perfect Havoc	1	4
2	2	Jawsh 685 and Jason Derulo	"Savage Love (Laxed – Siren Beat)"	RCA	1	7
3	3	DaBaby featuring Roddy Ricch	"Rockstar"	Interscope	1	15
4	New	Nathan Dawe featuring KSI	"Lighter"	Atlantic	4	1
5	9	Headie One and Drake	"Only You Freestyle"	Relentless	5	2
6	New	Taylor Swift	"Cardigan"	EMI	6	1
7	5	Harry Styles	"Watermelon Sugar"	Columbia	5	25
8	New	Taylor Swift featuring Bon Iver	"Exile"	EMI	8	1
9	6	AJ Tracey and Mabel	"West Ten"	AJ Tracey	6	4
10	New	Taylor Swift	"The 1"	EMI	10	1
7-13 August
1	1	Joel Corry featuring MNEK	"Head & Heart"	Asylum/Perfect Havoc	1	5
2	2	Jawsh 685 and Jason Derulo	"Savage Love (Laxed – Siren Beat)"	RCA	1	8
3	4	Nathan Dawe featuring KSI	"Lighter"	Atlantic	3	2
4	7	Harry Styles	"Watermelon Sugar"	Columbia	4	26
5	9	AJ Tracey and Mabel	"West Ten"	AJ Tracey	5	5
6	11	Regard and Raye	"Secrets"	Ministry of Sound	6	15
7	New	Billie Eilish	"My Future"	Interscope	7	1
8	5	Headie One and Drake	"Only You Freestyle"	Relentless	5	3
9	12	DJ Khaled featuring Drake	"Greece"	Black Butter/OVO/Republic	8	3
10	14	Chris Brown and Young Thug	"Go Crazy"	300 Ent./Chris Brown Ent./RCA	10	13
14-20 August
1	1	Joel Corry featuring MNEK	"Head & Heart"	Asylum/Perfect Havoc	1	6
2	2	Jawsh 685 and Jason Derulo	"Savage Love (Laxed – Siren Beat)"	RCA	1	9
3	3	Nathan Dawe featuring KSI	"Lighter"	Atlantic	3	3
4	New	Cardi B featuring Megan Thee Stallion	"WAP"	Atlantic	4	1
5	4	Harry Styles	"Watermelon Sugar"	Columbia	4	27
6	5	AJ Tracey and Mabel	"West Ten"	AJ Tracey	5	6
7	6	Regard and Raye	"Secrets"	Ministry of Sound	6	16
8	16	Pop Smoke featuring Lil Tjay	"Mood Swings"	Republic Records	8	5
9	9	DJ Khaled featuring Drake	"Greece"	Black Butter/OVO/Republic	8	4
10	10	Chris Brown and Young Thug	"Go Crazy"	300 Ent./Chris Brown Ent./RCA	10	14
21-27 August
1	1	Joel Corry featuring MNEK	"Head & Heart"	Asylum/Perfect Havoc	1	7
2	4	Cardi B featuring Megan Thee Stallion	"WAP"	Atlantic	2	2
3	3	Nathan Dawe featuring KSI	"Lighter"	Atlantic	3	4
4	New	Drake featuring Lil Durk	"Laugh Now Cry Later"	OVO/Republic Records	4	1
5	5	Harry Styles	"Watermelon Sugar"	Columbia	4	28
6	8	Pop Smoke featuring Lil Tjay	"Mood Swings"	Republic Records	6	6
7	6	AJ Tracey and Mabel	"West Ten"	AJ Tracey	5	7
8	9	DJ Khaled featuring Drake	"Greece"	Black Butter/OVO/Republic	8	5
9	7	Regard and Raye	"Secrets"	Ministry of Sound	6	17
10	2	Jawsh 685 and Jason Derulo	"Savage Love (Laxed – Siren Beat)"	RCA	1	10
28 August-3 September
1	1	Joel Corry featuring MNEK	"Head & Heart"	Asylum/Perfect Havoc	1	8
2	2	Cardi B featuring Megan Thee Stallion	"WAP"	Atlantic	2	3
3	New	BTS	"Dynamite"	Big Hit Entertainment	3	1
4	New	Headie One, AJ Tracey and Stormzy	"Ain't It Different"	Relentless	4	1
5	3	Nathan Dawe featuring KSI	"Lighter"	Atlantic	3	5
6	4	Drake featuring Lil Durk	"Laugh Now Cry Later"	OVO/Republic Records	4	2
7	6	Pop Smoke featuring Lil Tjay	"Mood Swings"	Republic Records	6	7
8	5	Harry Styles	"Watermelon Sugar"	Columbia	4	29
9	7	AJ Tracey and Mabel	"West Ten"	AJ Tracey	5	8
10	8	DJ Khaled featuring Drake	"Greece"	Black Butter/OVO/Republic	8	6
4-10 September
1	2	Cardi B featuring Megan Thee Stallion	"WAP"	Atlantic	1	4
2	1	Joel Corry featuring MNEK	"Head & Heart"	Asylum/Perfect Havoc	1	9
3	5	Nathan Dawe featuring KSI	"Lighter"	Atlantic	3	6
4	11	24kGoldn featuring Iann Dior	"Mood"	Black Butter/Records	4	3
5	4	Headie One, AJ Tracey and Stormzy	"Ain't It Different"	Relentless	4	2
6	7	Pop Smoke featuring Lil Tjay	"Mood Swings"	Republic Records	6	8
7	6	Drake featuring Lil Durk	"Laugh Now Cry Later"	OVO/Republic Records	4	3
8	8	Harry Styles	"Watermelon Sugar"	Columbia	4	30
9	10	DJ Khaled featuring Drake	"Greece"	Black Butter/OVO/Republic	8	7
10	9	AJ Tracey and Mabel	"West Ten"	AJ Tracey	5	9
11-17 September
1	1	Cardi B featuring Megan Thee Stallion	"WAP"	Atlantic	1	5
2	4	24kGoldn featuring Iann Dior	"Mood"	Black Butter/Records	2	4
3	5	Headie One, AJ Tracey and Stormzy	"Ain't It Different"	Relentless	3	3
4	3	Nathan Dawe featuring KSI	"Lighter"	Atlantic	3	7
5	6	Pop Smoke featuring Lil Tjay	"Mood Swings"	Republic Records	5	9
6	2	Joel Corry featuring MNEK	"Head & Heart"	Asylum/Perfect Havoc	1	10
7	7	Drake featuring Lil Durk	"Laugh Now Cry Later"	OVO/Republic Records	4	4
8	12	Paul Woolford and Diplo featuring Kareen Lomax	"Looking for Me"	Ministry of Sound	8	9
9	9	DJ Khaled featuring Drake	"Greece"	Black Butter/OVO/Republic	8	8
10	17	Miley Cyrus	"Midnight Sky"	RCA	10	4
18-24 September
1	1	Cardi B featuring Megan Thee Stallion	"WAP"	Atlantic	1	6
2	2	24kGoldn featuring Iann Dior	"Mood"	Black Butter/Records	2	5
3	3	Headie One, AJ Tracey and Stormzy	"Ain't It Different"	Relentless	3	4
4	4	Nathan Dawe featuring KSI	"Lighter"	Atlantic	3	8
5	8	Paul Woolford and Diplo featuring Kareen Lomax	"Looking for Me"	Ministry of Sound	5	10
6	5	Pop Smoke featuring Lil Tjay	"Mood Swings"	Republic Records	5	10
7	6	Joel Corry featuring MNEK	"Head & Heart"	Asylum/Perfect Havoc	1	11
8	7	Drake featuring Lil Durk	"Laugh Now Cry Later"	OVO/Republic Records	4	5
9	11	Jason Derulo	"Take You Dancing"	Atlantic	9	8
10	10	Miley Cyrus	"Midnight Sky"	RCA	10	5
25 September-1 October
1	2	24kGoldn featuring Iann Dior	"Mood"	Black Butter/Records	1	6
2	1	Cardi B featuring Megan Thee Stallion	"WAP"	Atlantic	1	7
3	3	Headie One, AJ Tracey and Stormzy	"Ain't It Different"	Relentless	3	5
4	5	Paul Woolford and Diplo featuring Kareen Lomax	"Looking for Me"	Ministry of Sound	4	11
5	6	Pop Smoke featuring Lil Tjay	"Mood Swings"	Republic Records	5	11
6	4	Nathan Dawe featuring KSI	"Lighter"	Atlantic	3	9
7	9	Jason Derulo	"Take You Dancing"	Atlantic	7	9
8	16	Internet Money featuring Gunna, Don Toliver and Nav	"Lemonade"	TenThousand Projects	8	6
9	7	Joel Corry featuring MNEK	"Head & Heart"	Asylum/Perfect Havoc	1	12
10	New	Justin Bieber featuring Chance the Rapper	"Holy"	Def Jam	10	1
2-8 October
1	1	24kGoldn featuring Iann Dior	"Mood"	Black Butter/Records	1	7
2	2	Cardi B featuring Megan Thee Stallion	"WAP"	Atlantic	1	8
3	3	Headie One, AJ Tracey and Stormzy	"Ain't It Different"	Relentless	3	6
4	4	Paul Woolford and Diplo featuring Kareen Lomax	"Looking for Me"	Ministry of Sound	4	12
5	8	Internet Money featuring Gunna, Don Toliver and Nav	"Lemonade"	TenThousand Projects	5	7
6	5	Pop Smoke featuring Lil Tjay	"Mood Swings"	Republic Records	5	12
7	11	Miley Cyrus	"Midnight Sky"	RCA	7	7
8	7	Jason Derulo	"Take You Dancing"	Atlantic	7	10
9	15	Tate McRae	"You Broke Me First"	Ministry of Sound	9	10
10	10	Justin Bieber featuring Chance the Rapper	"Holy"	Def Jam	10	2
9-15 October
1	1	24kGoldn featuring Iann Dior	"Mood"	Black Butter/Records	1	8
2	2	Cardi B featuring Megan Thee Stallion	"WAP"	Atlantic	1	9
3	5	Internet Money featuring Gunna, Don Toliver and Nav	"Lemonade"	TenThousand Projects	3	8
4	3	Headie One, AJ Tracey and Stormzy	"Ain't It Different"	Relentless	3	7
5	4	Paul Woolford and Diplo featuring Kareen Lomax	"Looking for Me"	Ministry of Sound	4	13
6	6	Pop Smoke featuring Lil Tjay	"Mood Swings"	Republic Records	5	13
7	9	Tate McRae	"You Broke Me First"	Ministry of Sound	7	11
8	7	Miley Cyrus	"Midnight Sky"	RCA	7	8
9	14	Pop Smoke	"What You Know Bout Love"	Republic Records	9	3
10	8	Jason Derulo	"Take You Dancing"	Atlantic	7	11
16-22 October
1	1	24kGoldn featuring Iann Dior	"Mood"	Black Butter/Records	1	9
2	4	Headie One, AJ Tracey and Stormzy	"Ain't It Different"	Relentless	2	8
3	3	Internet Money featuring Gunna, Don Toliver and Nav	"Lemonade"	TenThousand Projects	3	9
4	5	Paul Woolford and Diplo featuring Kareen Lomax	"Looking for Me"	Ministry of Sound	4	14
5	7	Tate McRae	"You Broke Me First"	Ministry of Sound	5	12
6	8	Miley Cyrus	"Midnight Sky"	RCA	6	9
7	9	Pop Smoke	"What You Know Bout Love"	Republic Records	7	4
8	6	Pop Smoke featuring Lil Tjay	"Mood Swings"	Republic Records	5	14
9	10	Jason Derulo	"Take You Dancing"	Atlantic	7	12
10	12	Justin Bieber featuring Chance the Rapper	"Holy"	Def Jam	10	4
23-29 October
1	3	Internet Money featuring Gunna, Don Toliver and Nav	"Lemonade"	TenThousand Projects	1	10
2	2	Headie One, AJ Tracey and Stormzy	"Ain't It Different"	Relentless	2	9
3	5	Tate McRae	"You Broke Me First"	Ministry of Sound	3	13
4	7	Pop Smoke	"What You Know Bout Love"	Republic Records	4	5
5	6	Miley Cyrus	"Midnight Sky"	RCA	5	10
6	15	Wes Nelson and Hardy Caprio	"See Nobody"	EMI	6	5
7	10	Justin Bieber featuring Chance the Rapper	"Holy"	Def Jam	7	5
8	12	Clean Bandit and Mabel featuring 24kGoldn	"Tick Tock"	Atlantic	8	9
9	1	24kGoldn featuring Iann Dior	"Mood"	Black Butter/Records	1	10
10	13	Sigala and James Arthur	"Lasting Lover"	Ministry of Sound	10	7
30 October-5 November
1	New	Ariana Grande	"Positions"	Republic Records	1	1
2	1	Internet Money featuring Gunna, Don Toliver and Nav	"Lemonade"	TenThousand Projects	1	11
3	New	KSI featuring Craig David and Digital Farm Animals	"Really Love"	BMG	3	1
4	6	Wes Nelson and Hardy Caprio	"See Nobody"	EMI	4	6
5	3	Tate McRae	"You Broke Me First"	Ministry of Sound	3	14
6	2	Headie One, AJ Tracey and Stormzy	"Ain't It Different"	Relentless	2	10
7	4	Pop Smoke	"What You Know Bout Love"	Republic Records	4	6
8	New	Little Mix	"Sweet Melody"	RCA	8	1
9	5	Miley Cyrus	"Midnight Sky"	RCA	5	11
10	7	Justin Bieber featuring Chance the Rapper	"Holy"	Def Jam	7	6
6-12 November
1	1	Ariana Grande	"Positions"	Republic Records	1	2
2	2	Internet Money featuring Gunna, Don Toliver and Nav	"Lemonade"	TenThousand Projects	1	12
3	4	Wes Nelson and Hardy Caprio	"See Nobody"	EMI	3	7
4	5	Tate McRae	"You Broke Me First"	Ministry of Sound	3	15
5	7	Pop Smoke	"What You Know Bout Love"	Republic Records	4	7
6	6	Headie One, AJ Tracey and Stormzy	"Ain't It Different"	Relentless	2	11
7	9	Miley Cyrus	"Midnight Sky"	RCA	5	12
8	3	KSI featuring Craig David and Digital Farm Animals	"Really Love"	BMG	3	2
9	New	Ariana Grande	"34+35"	Republic Records	9	1
10	10	Justin Bieber featuring Chance the Rapper	"Holy"	Def Jam	7	7
13-19 November
1	1	Ariana Grande	"Positions"	Republic Records	1	3
2	2	Internet Money featuring Gunna, Don Toliver and Nav	"Lemonade"	TenThousand Projects	1	13
3	12	Little Mix	"Sweet Melody"	RCA	3	3
4	3	Wes Nelson and Hardy Caprio	"See Nobody"	EMI	3	8
5	7	Miley Cyrus	"Midnight Sky"	RCA	5	13
6	4	Tate McRae	"You Broke Me First"	Ministry of Sound	3	16
7	5	Pop Smoke	"What You Know Bout Love"	Republic Records	4	8
8	8	KSI featuring Craig David and Digital Farm Animals	"Really Love"	BMG	3	3
9	10	Justin Bieber featuring Chance the Rapper	"Holy"	Def Jam	7	8
10	13	Dua Lipa	"Levitating"	Warner Records	10	11
20-26 November
1	1	Ariana Grande	"Positions"	Republic Records	1	4
2	New	Billie Eilish	"Therefore I Am"	Interscope	2	1
3	3	Little Mix	"Sweet Melody"	RCA	3	4
4	2	Internet Money featuring Gunna, Don Toliver and Nav	"Lemonade"	TenThousand Projects	1	14
5	4	Wes Nelson and Hardy Caprio	"See Nobody"	EMI	3	9
6	6	Tate McRae	"You Broke Me First"	Ministry of Sound	3	17
7	New	BBC Radio 2 Allstars	"Stop Crying Your Heart Out"	Decca	7	1
8	5	Miley Cyrus	"Midnight Sky"	RCA	5	14
9	7	Pop Smoke	"What You Know Bout Love"	Republic Records	4	9
10	10	Dua Lipa	"Levitating"	Warner Records	10	12
27 November-3 December
1	1	Ariana Grande	"Positions"	Republic Records	1	5
2	2	Billie Eilish	"Therefore I Am"	Interscope	2	2
3	3	Little Mix	"Sweet Melody"	RCA	3	5
4	5	Wes Nelson and Hardy Caprio	"See Nobody"	EMI	3	10
5	10	Dua Lipa	"Levitating"	Warner Records	5	13
6	6	Tate McRae	"You Broke Me First"	Ministry of Sound	3	18
7	8	Miley Cyrus	"Midnight Sky"	RCA	5	15
8	New	Miley Cyrus featuring Dua Lipa	"Prisoner"	RCA/Warner Records	8	1
9	New	Shawn Mendes and Justin Bieber	"Monster"	Island	9	1
10	New	BTS	"Life Goes On"	Big Hit Entertainment	10	1
4-10 December
1	1	Ariana Grande	"Positions"	Republic Records	1	6
2	14	Mariah Carey	"All I Want for Christmas Is You"	Columbia	2	103
3	20	Wham!	"Last Christmas"	RCA	2	68
4	3	Little Mix	"Sweet Melody"	RCA	3	6
5	7	Miley Cyrus	"Midnight Sky"	RCA	5	16
6	2	Billie Eilish	"Therefore I Am"	Interscope	2	3
7	5	Dua Lipa	"Levitating"	Warner Records	5	14
8	26	The Pogues featuring Kirsty MacColl	"Fairytale of New York"	Warner Bros.	2	102
9	6	Tate McRae	"You Broke Me First"	Ministry of Sound	3	19
10	13	Ariana Grande	"34+35"	Republic Records	9	5
11-17 December
1	2	Mariah Carey	"All I Want for Christmas Is You"	Columbia	1	104
2	3	Wham!	"Last Christmas"	RCA	2	69
3	1	Ariana Grande	"Positions"	Republic Records	1	7
4	8	The Pogues featuring Kirsty MacColl	"Fairytale of New York"	Warner Bros.	2	103
5	4	Little Mix	"Sweet Melody"	RCA	3	7
6	14	Shakin' Stevens	"Merry Christmas Everyone"	RCA	1	75
7	13	Michael Bublé	"It's Beginning to Look a Lot Like Christmas"	Reprise	7	37
8	15	Band Aid	"Do They Know It's Christmas?"	Mercury	1	84
9	10	Ariana Grande	"34+35"	Republic Records	9	6
10	18	Elton John	"Step into Christmas"	Mercury	8	42
18-24 December
1	1	Mariah Carey	"All I Want for Christmas Is You"	Columbia	1	105
2	2	Wham!	"Last Christmas"	RCA	2	70
3	New	Taylor Swift	"Willow"	EMI	3	1
4	3	Ariana Grande	"Positions"	Republic Records	1	8
5	4	The Pogues featuring Kirsty MacColl	"Fairytale of New York"	Warner Bros.	2	104
6	6	Shakin' Stevens	"Merry Christmas Everyone"	RCA	1	76
7	8	Band Aid	"Do They Know It's Christmas?"	Mercury	1	85
8	5	Little Mix	"Sweet Melody"	RCA	3	8
9	13	Jess Glynne	"This Christmas"	Atlantic	9	4
10	12	CJ	"Whoopty"	Equity Distribution	10	8
25-31 December
1	New	LadBaby	"Don't Stop Me Eatin'"	Frtyfve	1	1
2	1	Mariah Carey	"All I Want for Christmas Is You"	Columbia	1	106
3	2	Wham!	"Last Christmas"	RCA	2	71
4	9	Jess Glynne	"This Christmas"	Atlantic	4	5
5	New	The Kunts	"Boris Johnson Is a Fucking Cunt"	Disco Minge	5	1
6	5	The Pogues featuring Kirsty MacColl	"Fairytale of New York"	Warner Bros.	2	105
7	6	Shakin' Stevens	"Merry Christmas Everyone"	RCA	1	77
8	21	Justin Bieber	"Rockin' Around the Christmas Tree"	Def Jam	8	6
9	7	Band Aid	"Do They Know It's Christmas?"	Mercury	1	86
10	11	Elton John	"Step into Christmas"	Mercury	8	44

== 2021 ==
Key
No.	Song's position on the UK Singles Chart at the time
New	A single's first time on the top ten

No.	Previous week pos.	Artist	Single	Record label (Note: The record labels are those given by the OCC.)	Peak position	Weeks on chart
1-7 January
1	3	Wham!	"Last Christmas"	RCA	1	72
2	2	Mariah Carey	"All I Want for Christmas Is You"	Columbia	1	107
3	4	Jess Glynne	"This Christmas"	Atlantic	3	6
4	8	Justin Bieber	"Rockin' Around the Christmas Tree"	Def Jam	4	7
5	6	The Pogues featuring Kirsty MacColl	"Fairytale of New York"	Warner Bros.	2	106
6	7	Shakin' Stevens	"Merry Christmas Everyone"	RCA	1	78
7	9	Band Aid	"Do They Know It's Christmas?"	Mercury	1	87
8	10	Elton John	"Step into Christmas"	Mercury	8	45
9	20	Little Mix	"Sweet Melody"	RCA	3	10
10	12	Michael Bublé	"It's Beginning to Look a Lot Like Christmas"	Reprise	7	40
8-14 January
1	9	Little Mix	"Sweet Melody"	RCA	1	11
2	13	Ed Sheeran	"Afterglow"	Asylum	2	3
3	14	CJ	"Whoopty"	Equity Distribution	3	11
4	New	Justin Bieber	"Anyone"	Def Jam	4	1
5	68	Dua Lipa	"Levitating"	Warner Records	5	19
6	22	Shane Codd	"Get Out My Head"	Polydor	6	10
7	26	The Kid LAROI	"Without You"	RCA	7	8
8	20	Ariana Grande	"34+35"	Republic Records	8	10
9	74	Tate McRae	"You Broke Me First"	Ministry of Sound	3	24
10	29	Meduza featuring Dermot Kennedy	"Paradise"	Island/The Cross Records	10	10
15-21 January
1	New	Olivia Rodrigo	"drivers license"	Interscope	1	1
2	1	Little Mix	"Sweet Melody"	RCA	1	12
3	2	Ed Sheeran	"Afterglow"	Asylum	2	4
4	3	CJ	"Whoopty"	Equity Distribution	3	12
5	4	Justin Bieber	"Anyone"	Def Jam	4	2
6	7	The Kid LAROI	"Without You"	RCA	6	9
7	10	Meduza featuring Dermot Kennedy	"Paradise"	Island/The Cross Records	7	11
8	6	Shane Codd	"Get Out My Head"	Polydor	6	11
9	5	Dua Lipa	"Levitating"	Warner Records	5	20
10	9	Tate McRae	"You Broke Me First"	Ministry of Sound	3	25
22-28 January
1	1	Olivia Rodrigo	"drivers license"	Interscope	1	2
2	New	Anne-Marie, KSI and Digital Farm Animals	"Don't Play"	Atlantic	2	1
3	11	Ariana Grande	"34+35"	Republic Records	3	12
4	2	Little Mix	"Sweet Melody"	RCA	1	13
5	6	The Kid LAROI	"Without You"	RCA	5	10
6	7	Meduza featuring Dermot Kennedy	"Paradise"	Island/The Cross Records	6	12
7	3	Ed Sheeran	"Afterglow"	Asylum	2	5
8	5	Justin Bieber	"Anyone"	Def Jam	4	3
9	4	CJ	"Whoopty"	Equity Distribution	3	13
10	8	Shane Codd	"Get Out My Head"	Polydor	6	12
29 January-4 February
1	1	Olivia Rodrigo	"drivers license"	Interscope	1	3
2	5	The Kid LAROI	"Without You"	RCA	2	11
3	New	Nathan Evans, 220 Kid and Billen Ted	"Wellerman"	Polydor	3	1
4	2	Anne-Marie, KSI and Digital Farm Animals	"Don't Play"	Atlantic	2	2
5	6	Meduza featuring Dermot Kennedy	"Paradise"	Island/The Cross Records	5	13
6	4	Little Mix	"Sweet Melody"	RCA	1	14
7	8	Justin Bieber	"Anyone"	Def Jam	4	4
8	7	Ed Sheeran	"Afterglow"	Asylum	2	6
9	3	Ariana Grande	"34+35"	Republic Records	3	13
10	9	CJ	"Whoopty"	Equity Distribution	3	14
5-11 February
1	1	Olivia Rodrigo	"drivers license"	Interscope	1	4
2	3	Nathan Evans, 220 Kid and Billen Ted	"Wellerman"	Polydor	2	2
3	New	Fredo featuring Dave	"Money Talks"	Neighbourhood/Since 93	3	1
4	2	The Kid LAROI	"Without You"	RCA	2	12
5	4	Anne-Marie, KSI and Digital Farm Animals	"Don't Play"	Atlantic	2	3
6	5	Meduza featuring Dermot Kennedy	"Paradise"	Island/The Cross Records	5	14
7	6	Little Mix	"Sweet Melody"	RCA	1	15
8	11	Shane Codd	"Get Out My Head"	Polydor	6	14
9	7	Justin Bieber	"Anyone"	Def Jam	4	5
10	8	Ed Sheeran	"Afterglow"	Asylum	2	7
12-18 February
1	1	Olivia Rodrigo	"drivers license"	Interscope	1	5
2	2	Nathan Evans, 220 Kid and Billen Ted	"Wellerman"	Polydor	2	3
3	4	The Kid LAROI	"Without You"	RCA	2	13
4	5	Anne-Marie, KSI and Digital Farm Animals	"Don't Play"	Atlantic	2	4
5	New	Digga D and AJ Tracey	"Bringing It Back"	CGM	5	1
6	6	Meduza featuring Dermot Kennedy	"Paradise"	Island/The Cross Records	5	15
7	11	Tiësto	"The Business"	Atlantic	7	13
8	8	Shane Codd	"Get Out My Head"	Polydor	6	15
9	9	Justin Bieber	"Anyone"	Def Jam	4	6
10	16	Travis Scott and HVME	"Goosebumps (Remix)"	B1/Ministry of Sound	10	6
19-25 February
1	1	Olivia Rodrigo	"drivers license"	Interscope	1	6
2	New	Lil Tjay and 6lack	"Calling My Phone"	Columbia	2	1
3	2	Nathan Evans, 220 Kid and Billen Ted	"Wellerman"	Polydor	2	4
4	4	Anne-Marie, KSI and Digital Farm Animals	"Don't Play"	Atlantic	2	5
5	3	The Kid LAROI	"Without You"	RCA	2	14
6	7	Tiësto	"The Business"	Atlantic	6	14
7	6	Meduza featuring Dermot Kennedy	"Paradise"	Island/The Cross Records	5	16
8	8	Shane Codd	"Get Out My Head"	Polydor	6	16
9	10	Travis Scott and HVME	"Goosebumps (Remix)"	B1/Ministry of Sound	9	7
10	16	Riton and Nightcrawlers featuring Mufasa & Hypeman	"Friday"	Ministry of Sound	10	5
26 February-4 March
1	1	Olivia Rodrigo	"drivers license"	Interscope	1	7
2	2	Lil Tjay and 6lack	"Calling My Phone"	Columbia	2	2
3	3	Nathan Evans, 220 Kid and Billen Ted	"Wellerman"	Polydor	2	5
4	6	Tiësto	"The Business"	Atlantic	4	15
5	5	The Kid LAROI	"Without You"	RCA	2	15
6	4	Anne-Marie, KSI and Digital Farm Animals	"Don't Play"	Atlantic	2	6
7	10	Riton and Nightcrawlers featuring Mufasa & Hypeman	"Friday"	Ministry of Sound	7	6
8	7	Meduza featuring Dermot Kennedy	"Paradise"	Island/The Cross Records	5	17
9	9	Travis Scott and HVME	"Goosebumps (Remix)"	B1/Ministry of Sound	9	8
10	8	Shane Codd	"Get Out My Head"	Polydor	6	17
5-11 March
1	1	Olivia Rodrigo	"drivers license"	Interscope	1	8
2	3	Nathan Evans, 220 Kid and Billen Ted	"Wellerman"	Polydor	2	6
3	2	Lil Tjay and 6lack	"Calling My Phone"	Columbia	2	3
4	4	Tiësto	"The Business"	Atlantic	4	16
5	7	Riton and Nightcrawlers featuring Mufasa & Hypeman	"Friday"	Ministry of Sound	5	7
6	6	Anne-Marie, KSI and Digital Farm Animals	"Don't Play"	Atlantic	2	7
7	5	The Kid LAROI	"Without You"	RCA	2	16
8	9	Travis Scott and HVME	"Goosebumps (Remix)"	B1/Ministry of Sound	8	9
9	8	Meduza featuring Dermot Kennedy	"Paradise"	Island/The Cross Records	5	18
10	10	Shane Codd	"Get Out My Head"	Polydor	6	18
12-18 March
1	1	Olivia Rodrigo	"drivers license"	Interscope	1	9
2	2	Nathan Evans, 220 Kid and Billen Ted	"Wellerman"	Polydor	2	7
3	4	Tiësto	"The Business"	Atlantic	3	17
4	New	Drake	"What's Next"	OVO/Republic Records	4	1
5	3	Lil Tjay and 6lack	"Calling My Phone"	Columbia	2	4
6	1	Drake featuring Rick Ross	"Lemon Pepper Freestyle"	OVO/Republic Records	6	1
7	5	Riton and Nightcrawlers featuring Mufasa & Hypeman	"Friday"	Ministry of Sound	5	8
8	7	The Kid LAROI	"Without You"	RCA	2	17
9	6	Anne-Marie, KSI and Digital Farm Animals	"Don't Play"	Atlantic	2	8
10	New	Drake featuring Lil Baby	"Wants and Needs"	OVO/Republic Records	10	1
19-25 March
1	2	Nathan Evans, 220 Kid and Billen Ted	"Wellerman"	Polydor	1	8
2	12	A1 x J1	"Latest Trends"	EMI	2	6
3	New	KSI featuring YUNGBLUD and Polo G	"Patience"	BMG/Interscope	3	1
4	3	Tiësto	"The Business"	Atlantic	3	18
5	7	Riton and Nightcrawlers featuring Mufasa & Hypeman	"Friday"	Ministry of Sound	5	9
6	5	Lil Tjay and 6lack	"Calling My Phone"	Columbia	2	5
7	9	Anne-Marie, KSI and Digital Farm Animals	"Don't Play"	Atlantic	2	9
8	17	Joel Corry, Raye and David Guetta	"Bed"	Asylum/Perfect Havoc	8	3
9	18	Central Cee	"Commitment Issues"	Central Cee	9	5
10	11	Travis Scott and HVME	"Goosebumps (Remix)"	B1/Ministry of Sound	8	11
26 March-1 April
1	1	Nathan Evans, 220 Kid and Billen Ted	"Wellerman"	Polydor	1	9
2	2	A1 x J1	"Latest Trends"	EMI	2	7
3	1	Justin Bieber featuring Daniel Caesar and Giveon	"Peaches"	Def Jam	3	1
4	5	Riton and Nightcrawlers featuring Mufasa & Hypeman	"Friday"	Ministry of Sound	4	10
5	4	Tiësto	"The Business"	Atlantic	3	19
6	8	Joel Corry, Raye and David Guetta	"Bed"	Asylum/Perfect Havoc	6	4
7	3	KSI featuring YUNGBLUD and Polo G	"Patience"	BMG/Interscope	3	2
8	7	Anne-Marie, KSI and Digital Farm Animals	"Don't Play"	Atlantic	2	10
9	6	Lil Tjay and 6lack	"Calling My Phone"	Columbia	2	6
10	31	Justin Bieber	"Hold On"	Def Jam	10	3
2-8 April
1	New	Lil Nas X	"Montero (Call Me by Your Name)"	Lil Nas X	1	1
2	1	Nathan Evans, 220 Kid and Billen Ted	"Wellerman"	Polydor	1	10
3	3	Justin Bieber featuring Daniel Caesar and Giveon	"Peaches"	Def Jam	3	2
4	2	A1 x J1	"Latest Trends"	EMI	2	8
5	4	Riton and Nightcrawlers featuring Mufasa & Hypeman	"Friday"	Ministry of Sound	4	11
6	5	Tiësto	"The Business"	Atlantic	3	20
7	6	Joel Corry, Raye and David Guetta	"Bed"	Asylum/Perfect Havoc	6	5
8	12	ATB, Topic and A7S	"Your Love (9PM)"	Positiva	8	10
9	8	Anne-Marie, KSI and Digital Farm Animals	"Don't Play"	Atlantic	2	11
10	13	Tom Grennan	"Little Bit of Love"	Insanity	10	9
9-15 April
1	1	Lil Nas X	"Montero (Call Me by Your Name)"	Lil Nas X	1	2
2	3	Justin Bieber featuring Daniel Caesar and Giveon	"Peaches"	Def Jam	2	3
3	2	Nathan Evans, 220 Kid and Billen Ted	"Wellerman"	Polydor	1	11
4	4	A1 x J1	"Latest Trends"	EMI	2	9
5	5	Riton and Nightcrawlers featuring Mufasa & Hypeman	"Friday"	Ministry of Sound	4	12
6	7	Joel Corry, Raye and David Guetta	"Bed"	Asylum/Perfect Havoc	6	6
7	6	Tiësto	"The Business"	Atlantic	3	21
8	8	ATB, Topic and A7S	"Your Love (9PM)"	Positiva	8	11
9	9	Anne-Marie, KSI and Digital Farm Animals	"Don't Play"	Atlantic	2	12
10	10	Tom Grennan	"Little Bit of Love"	Insanity	10	10
16-22 April
1	1	Lil Nas X	"Montero (Call Me by Your Name)"	Lil Nas X	1	3
2	2	Justin Bieber featuring Daniel Caesar and Giveon	"Peaches"	Def Jam	2	4
3	1	Polo G	"Rapstar"	Columbia	3	1
4	6	Joel Corry, Raye and David Guetta	"Bed"	Asylum/Perfect Havoc	4	7
5	3	Nathan Evans, 220 Kid and Billen Ted	"Wellerman"	Polydor	1	12
6	5	Riton and Nightcrawlers featuring Mufasa & Hypeman	"Friday"	Ministry of Sound	4	13
7	7	Tiësto	"The Business"	Atlantic	3	22
8	10	Tom Grennan	"Little Bit of Love"	Insanity	8	11
9	New	Dave	"Titanium"	Neighbourhood	9	1
10	New	Doja Cat featuring SZA	"Kiss Me More"	Ministry of Sound	10	1
23-29 April
1	1	Lil Nas X	"Montero (Call Me by Your Name)"	Lil Nas X	1	4
2	2	Justin Bieber featuring Daniel Caesar and Giveon	"Peaches"	Def Jam	2	5
3	4	Joel Corry, Raye and David Guetta	"Bed"	Asylum/Perfect Havoc	3	8
4	3	Polo G	"Rapstar"	Columbia	3	2
5	6	Riton and Nightcrawlers featuring Mufasa & Hypeman	"Friday"	Ministry of Sound	4	14
6	5	Nathan Evans, 220 Kid and Billen Ted	"Wellerman"	Polydor	1	13
7	8	Tom Grennan	"Little Bit of Love"	Insanity	7	12
8	7	Tiësto	"The Business"	Atlantic	3	23
9	10	Doja Cat featuring SZA	"Kiss Me More"	Ministry of Sound	9	2
10	12	Ella Henderson and Tom Grennan	"Let's Go Home Together"	Atlantic	10	9
30 April-6 May
1	1	Lil Nas X	"Montero (Call Me by Your Name)"	Lil Nas X	1	5
2	2	Justin Bieber featuring Daniel Caesar and Giveon	"Peaches"	Def Jam	2	6
3	3	Joel Corry, Raye and David Guetta	"Bed"	Asylum/Perfect Havoc	3	9
4	14	Russ Millions and Tion Wayne	"Body"	Atlantic	4	5
5	5	Riton and Nightcrawlers featuring Mufasa & Hypeman	"Friday"	Ministry of Sound	4	15
6	9	Doja Cat featuring SZA	"Kiss Me More"	Ministry of Sound	6	3
7	4	Polo G	"Rapstar"	Columbia	3	3
8	7	Tom Grennan	"Little Bit of Love"	Insanity	7	13
9	6	Nathan Evans, 220 Kid and Billen Ted	"Wellerman"	Polydor	1	14
10	8	Tiësto	"The Business"	Atlantic	3	24
7-13 May
1	4	Russ Millions and Tion Wayne	"Body"	Atlantic	1	6
2	1	Lil Nas X	"Montero (Call Me by Your Name)"	Lil Nas X	1	6
3	6	Doja Cat featuring SZA	"Kiss Me More"	Ministry of Sound	3	4
4	2	Justin Bieber featuring Daniel Caesar and Giveon	"Peaches"	Def Jam	2	7
5	New	Billie Eilish	"Your Power"	Interscope	5	1
6	3	Joel Corry, Raye and David Guetta	"Bed"	Asylum/Perfect Havoc	3	10
7	5	Riton and Nightcrawlers featuring Mufasa & Hypeman	"Friday"	Ministry of Sound	4	16
8	20	The Weeknd	"Save Your Tears"	Republic Records/XO	8	17
9	7	Polo G	"Rapstar"	Columbia	3	4
10	8	Tom Grennan	"Little Bit of Love"	Insanity	7	14
14-20 May
1	1	Russ Millions and Tion Wayne	"Body"	Atlantic	1	7
2	2	Lil Nas X	"Montero (Call Me by Your Name)"	Lil Nas X	1	7
3	3	Doja Cat featuring SZA	"Kiss Me More"	Ministry of Sound	3	5
4	6	Joel Corry, Raye and David Guetta	"Bed"	Asylum/Perfect Havoc	3	11
5	8	The Weeknd	"Save Your Tears"	Republic Records/XO	5	18
6	4	Justin Bieber featuring Daniel Caesar and Giveon	"Peaches"	Def Jam	2	8
7	7	Riton and Nightcrawlers featuring Mufasa & Hypeman	"Friday"	Ministry of Sound	4	17
8	10	Tom Grennan	"Little Bit of Love"	Insanity	7	15
9	31	Rag'n'Bone Man and Pink	"Anywhere Away from Here"	Best Laid Plans/Columbia	9	5
10	9	Polo G	"Rapstar"	Columbia	3	5
21-27 May
1	1	Russ Millions and Tion Wayne	"Body"	Atlantic	1	8
2	New	Olivia Rodrigo	"Good 4 U"	Geffen	2	1
3	3	Doja Cat featuring SZA	"Kiss Me More"	Ministry of Sound	3	6
4	2	Lil Nas X	"Montero (Call Me by Your Name)"	Lil Nas X	1	8
5	5	The Weeknd	"Save Your Tears"	Republic Records/XO	5	19
6	4	Joel Corry, Raye and David Guetta	"Bed"	Asylum/Perfect Havoc	3	12
7	6	Justin Bieber featuring Daniel Caesar and Giveon	"Peaches"	Def Jam	2	9
8	7	Riton and Nightcrawlers featuring Mufasa & Hypeman	"Friday"	Ministry of Sound	4	18
9	9	Rag'n'Bone Man and Pink	"Anywhere Away from Here"	Best Laid Plans/Columbia	9	6
10	8	Tom Grennan	"Little Bit of Love"	Insanity	7	16
28 May-3 June
1	2	Olivia Rodrigo	"Good 4 U"	Geffen	1	2
2	1	Russ Millions and Tion Wayne	"Body"	Atlantic	1	9
3	New	BTS	"Butter"	BigHit Entertainment	3	1
4	11	Olivia Rodrigo	"deja vu"	Geffen	4	8
5	3	Doja Cat featuring SZA	"Kiss Me More"	Ministry of Sound	3	7
6	4	Lil Nas X	"Montero (Call Me by Your Name)"	Lil Nas X	1	9
7	New	Olivia Rodrigo	"traitor"	Geffen	7	1
8	5	The Weeknd	"Save Your Tears"	Republic Records/XO	5	20
9	New	Galantis, David Guetta and Little Mix	"Heartbreak Anthem"	Atlantic/RCA	9	1
10	24	Mimi Webb	"Good Without"	RCA	10	9
