= List of top 10 singles in 2020 (Ireland) =

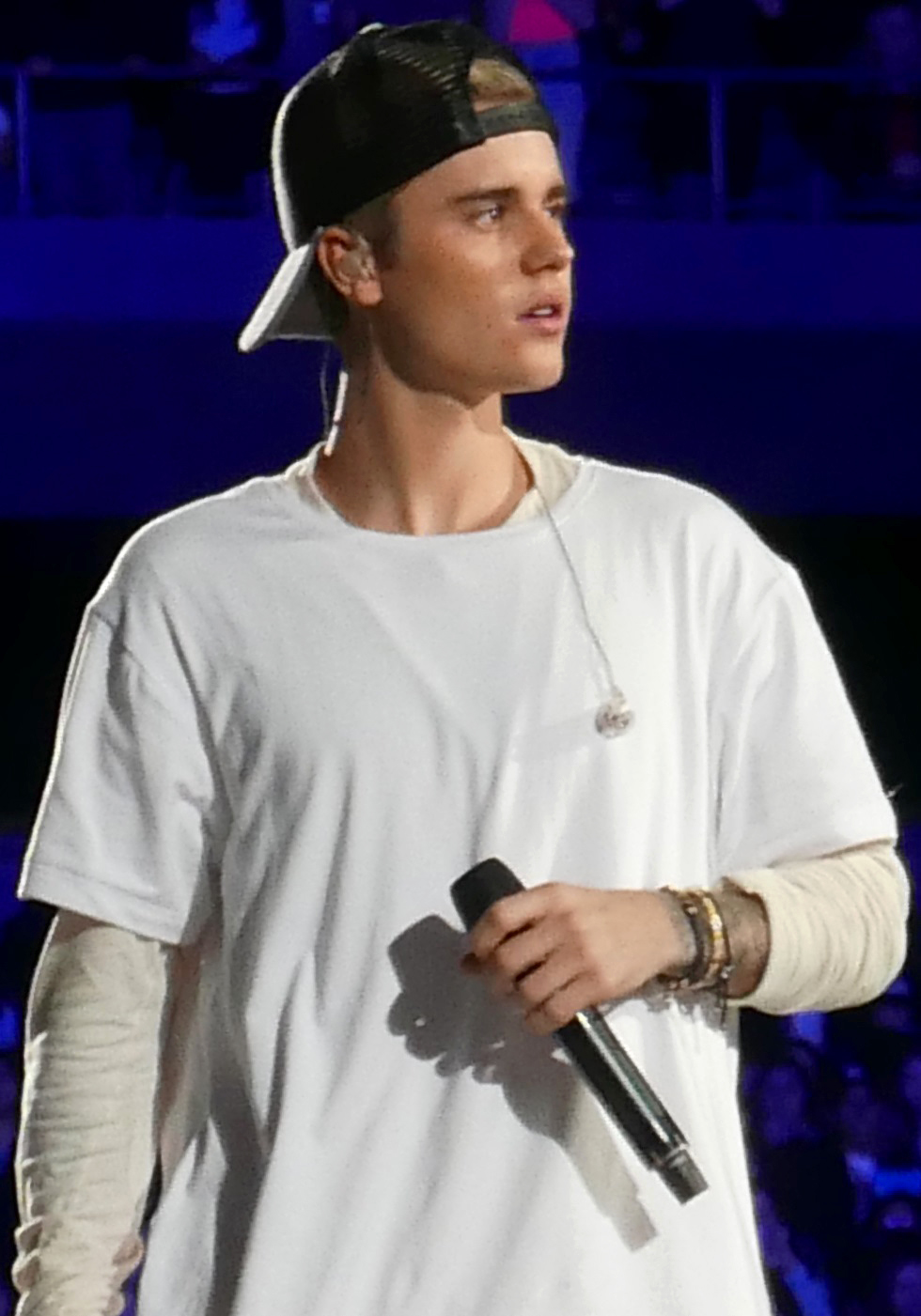
Justin Bieber was the artist with the most top ten entries in 2020. He earned 6 top ten hits this year with "Yummy", "Intentions" (featuring Quavo), "Stuck with U" (a duet with Ariana Grande), "Holy" (featuring Chance the Rapper), "Lonely" (a duet with Benny Blanco) and "Monster" (a duet with Shawn Mendes).

This is a list of singles that peaked in the top 10 of the Irish Singles Chart in 2020, as compiled by the Official Charts Company on behalf of the Irish Recorded Music Association.

== Top-ten singles ==
Key

Symbol	Meaning
◁	Indicates single's top 10 entry was also its Irish Singles Chart top 100 debut

Artist(s)	Single	Peak	Peak date	Weeks at #1	Ref.
Arizona Zervas	"Roxanne"	4	3 January	-	
Camila Cabello featuring DaBaby	"My Oh My"	6	10 January	-	
Justin Bieber	"Yummy" ◁	8	10 January	-	
Future featuring Drake	"Life Is Good" ◁	5	17 January	-	
Eminem featuring Juice Wrld	"Godzilla" ◁	1	24 January	1	
Roddy Ricch	"The Box"	2	24 January	-	
The Weeknd	"Blinding Lights"	1	31 January	4	
Billie Eilish	"No Time to Die" ◁	1	21 February	1	
Justin Bieber featuring Quavo	"Intentions"	7	28 February	-	
Saint Jhn	"Roses"	1	6 March	8	
Lady Gaga	"Stupid Love" ◁	6	6 March	-	
Halsey	"You Should Be Sad"	5	13 March	-	
Doja Cat	"Say So"	4	13 March	-	
Aitch and AJ Tracey featuring Tay Keith	"Rain" ◁	10	13 March	-	
Niall Horan	"No Judgement"	6	20 March	-	
Joel Corry	"Lonely"	3	27 March	-	
Dua Lipa	"Physical" ◁	2	3 April	-	
Dua Lipa	"Break My Heart" ◁	3	3 April	-	
Powfu featuring beabadoobee	"Death Bed (Coffee for Your Head)"	7	17 April	-	
Doja Cat	"Boss Bitch"	8	17 April	-	
Mabel	"Boyfriend"	9	17 April	-	
Lil Mosey	"Blueberry Faygo"	4	24 April	-	
Benee featuring Gus Dapperton	"Supalonely"	10	24 April	-	
Drake	"Toosie Slide" ◁	1	1 May	2	
The Scotts (Travis Scott and Kid Cudi)	"The Scotts" ◁	2	1 May	-	
Juice Wrld	"Righteous" ◁	7	1 May	-	
Megan Thee Stallion	"Savage"	3	8 May	-	
Drake featuring Giveon	"Chicago Freestyle" ◁	9	8 May	-	
DaBaby featuring Roddy Ricch	"Rockstar" ◁	1	15 May	8	
Ariana Grande and Justin Bieber	"Stuck with U" ◁	2	15 May	-	
6ix9ine	"Gooba" ◁	4	15 May	-	
Daði Freyr	"Think About Things"	3	29 May	-	
Lady Gaga and Ariana Grande	"Rain on Me" ◁	1	29 May	1	
S1mba featuring DTG	"Rover"	3	12 June	-	
Topic and A7S	"Breaking Me"	3	26 June	-	
StaySolidRocky	"Party Girl"	10	26 June	-	
220 Kid and Gracey	"Don't Need Love"	9	10 July	-	
Harry Styles	"Watermelon Sugar"	2	17 July	-	
Jawsh 685 and Jason Derulo	"Savage Love (Laxed – Siren Beat)"	1	17 July	1	
Juice Wrld and Marshmello	"Come & Go" ◁	6	17 July	-	
Juice Wrld	"Wishing Well" ◁	9	17 July	-	
Joel Corry and MNEK	"Head & Heart"	1	24 July	5	
Taylor Swift featuring Bon Iver	"Exile" ◁	3	31 July	-	
Taylor Swift	"Cardigan" ◁	4	31 July	-	
Taylor Swift	"The 1" ◁	7	31 July	-	
Regard and Raye	"Secrets"	7	7 August	-	
Billie Eilish	"My Future" ◁	8	7 August	-	
Drake featuring Lil Durk	"Laugh Now Cry Later" ◁	5	21 August	-	
Pop Smoke featuring Lil Tjay	"Mood Swings"	9	21 August	-	
Cardi B featuring Megan Thee Stallion	"WAP" ◁	1	28 August	3	
Headie One featuring AJ Tracey and Stormzy	"Ain't It Different" ◁	5	28 August	-	
BTS	"Dynamite" ◁	6	28 August	-	
Nathan Dawe featuring KSI	"Lighter"	8	4 September	-	
24kGoldn featuring Iann Dior	"Mood"	1	18 September	4	
Jason Derulo	"Take You Dancing"	7	2 October	-	
Internet Money and Gunna featuring Don Toliver and Nav	"Lemonade"	3	16 October	-	
Paul Woolford and Diplo featuring Kareen Lomax	"Looking for Me"	1	16 October	2	
Pop Smoke	"What You Know Bout Love"	5	16 October	-	
Justin Bieber featuring Chance the Rapper	"Holy" ◁	2	30 October	-	
Ariana Grande	"Positions" ◁	1	30 October	3	
Justin Bieber and Benny Blanco	"Lonely"	9	6 November	-	
Ariana Grande	"34+35" ◁	4	6 November	-	
Tate McRae	"You Broke Me First"	3	13 November	-	
Miley Cyrus	"Midnight Sky"	4	13 November	-	
Billie Eilish	"Therefore I Am" ◁	1	20 November	1	
Dua Lipa	"Levitating"	4	27 November	-	
Meduza featuring Dermot Kennedy	"Paradise" ◁	1	27 November	3	
Miley Cyrus featuring Dua Lipa	"Prisoner" ◁	5	27 November	-	
Wes Nelson and Hardy Caprio	"See Nobody"	9	27 November	-	
Shawn Mendes and Justin Bieber	"Monster" ◁	10	27 November	-	
Dermot Kennedy	"Giants"	1	4 December	4	
The Kid Laroi	"Without You"	3	11 December	-	
Taylor Swift	"Willow" ◁	3	18 December	-	
Taylor Swift	"Champagne Problems" ◁	6	18 December	-	

== Entries by artist ==
The following table shows artists who achieved two or more top 10 entries in 2020. The figures include both main artists and featured artists and the peak position in brackets.

Entries	Artist	Songs
6	Justin Bieber	"Yummy" (8), "Intentions" (7), "Stuck with U" (2), "Holy" (2), "Lonely" (9), "Monster" (10)
5	Taylor Swift	"Exile" (3), "Cardigan" (4), "The 1" (7), "Willow" (3), "Champagne Problems" (6)
4	Dua Lipa	"Physical" (2), "Break My Heart" (3), "Levitating" (4), "Prisoner" (5)
4	Juice Wrld	"Godzilla" (1), "Righteous" (7), "Come & Go" (6), "Wishing Well" (9)
4	Ariana Grande	"Stuck with U" (2), "Rain on Me" (1), "Positions" (1), "34+35" (4)
3	Billie Eilish	"No Time to Die" (1), "My Future" (8), "Therefore I Am" (1)
3	Drake	"Toosie Slide" (1), "Chicago Freestyle" (9), "Laugh Now Cry Later" (5)
2	Doja Cat	"Say So" (4), "Boss Bitch" (8)
2	DaBaby	"My Oh My" (6), "Rockstar" (1)
2	Roddy Ricch	"The Box" (2), "Rockstar" (1)
2	Lady Gaga	"Stupid Love" (6), "Rain on Me" (1)
2	Joel Corry	"Lonely" (3), "Head & Heart" (1)
2	Megan Thee Stallion	"Savage" (3), "WAP" (1)
2	AJ Tracey	"Rain" (10), "Ain't It Different" (5)
2	Jason Derulo	"Savage Love (Laxed – Siren Beat)" (1), "Take You Dancing" (7)
2	Pop Smoke	"Mood Swings" (9), "What You Know Bout Love" (5)
2	Dermot Kennedy	"Giants" (1), "Paradise" (1)
2	Miley Cyrus	"Midnight Sky" (4), "Prisoner" (5)

== See also ==
- 2020 in music
- List of number-one singles of 2020 (Ireland)
