= Miss Me (disambiguation) =

"Miss Me", a song by Drake featuring Lil Wayne from Drake's album Thank Me Later.

Miss Me may also refer to:

- Miss Me?, a 2007 album by Korean singer Crown J
- "Miss Me" (Mohombi song), a song by Mohombi featuring Nelly from the 2010 album MoveMeant
- Miss Me?, a 2016 EP by Korean girl band I.O.I
- "Miss Me", a song by Gotthard from their 2017 album Silver
- "Miss Me" (MoStack song), a 2020 song by MoStack featuring AJ Tracey

== See also ==
- "Miss Me x 100", a TV episode
- Did You Miss Me? (disambiguation)
- Miss Me podcast from BBC Sounds
