= Brit Awards 2021 =

British music awards ceremony

- Date: 11 May 2021
- Venue: The O2
- Hosted by: Jack Whitehall

Highlights
- Most awards: Dua Lipa (2)
- Most nominations: Celeste; Joel Corry; Dua Lipa; Arlo Parks; Young T & Bugsey; AJ Tracey (3 each)

Television/radio coverage
- Network: ITV; ITV2 (Red Carpet); YouTube
- Runtime: 108 minutes
- Viewership: 2.9 million

Brit Awards 2021, the 41st edition of the annual Brit Awards, was the UK's first major indoor live music event in more than a year. It was held on 11 May 2021 and celebrated the best in British and international music. Usually held in February, the ceremony was delayed due to the COVID-19 pandemic. The ceremony was hosted by comedian Jack Whitehall for the fourth year in a row.

It was held at The O2 in Greenwich, Greater London for the 11th successive year.

== Performers ==
=== Pre-show ===
Pre-show performers
Performer(s)	Song	UK Singles Chart reaction (week ending 20 May 2021)	UK Albums Chart reaction (week ending 20 May 2021)
Jessie Ware	"Remember Where You Are"	N/A	N/A
Kurupt FM Craig David	"Summertime"	N/A	N/A

=== Main show ===
Main show performers
Performer(s)	Song(s)	UK Singles Chart reaction (week ending 20 May 2021)	UK Albums Chart reaction (week ending 20 May 2021)
Coldplay (Note: Performed live from the River Thames near Greenwich Peninsula on a pontoon.)	"Higher Power"	12 (debut)	N/A
Dua Lipa	Medley: "Love Again" "Physical" "Pretty Please" "Hallucinate" "Don't Start Now" "Future Nostalgia"	N/A; N/A; N/A; N/A; 96 (re); N/A	Future Nostalgia – 6 (+3); Dua Lipa – 29 (+4)
Olivia Rodrigo	"Drivers License"	40 (+3)	N/A
Arlo Parks	"Hope"	N/A	Collapsed in Sunbeams – 62 (re)
Elton John Years & Years	"It's a Sin"	57 (debut)	Diamonds – 8 (+4) N/A
The Weeknd (Note: Appeared virtually due to COVID-19 travel restrictions between Canada and England.)	"Save Your Tears"	5 (+4)	The Highlights – 9 (+9); After Hours – 41 (+29)
Griff	"Black Hole"	35 (+12)	N/A
Headie One AJ Tracey Young T & Bugsey	"Ain't It Different" "Princess Cuts"	N/A; N/A	N/A Flu Game – 17 (+2) N/A
Rag'n'Bone Man Pink (Note: Appeared virtually due to COVID-19 travel restrictions between the United States and England.) Lewisham & Greenwich NHS Choir	"Anywhere Away from Here"	9 (+22)	Life by Misadventure – 1 (debut); Human – 35 (+46) Greatest Hits... So Far!!! – 71 (+29)

== Background ==
Following the COVID-19 pandemic where close contact with others was greatly curtailed, the 2021 Brits were held with a limited live audience as part of a test by the UK government to trial the idea of crowds with no social distancing. Oliver Dowden, Secretary of State for the Department for Digital, Culture, Media and Sport, announced that the Brits will join the FA Cup Final and World Snooker Championship final as events that would feature larger crowds than allowed by law at the time. Dowden stated that "these test events will be crucial in finding ways to get fans and audiences back in safely without social distancing. We will be guided by the science and medical experts, but will work flat out to make that happen. We want to get the people back to enjoying what they love and ensure some of our most important growth industries get back on their feet. These are important steps towards the safe and special summer we all crave, and that I’m fully focused on delivering".

On 22 April 2021, it was announced that the ceremony would have a live audience of 4,000 key workers from London. As part of the pilot programme, everyone who attended would have to return a negative COVID PCR test before and after the ceremony. However, the crowd didn't need to be socially distanced or have to wear face masks once inside The O2. The other events that were part of the pilot scheme are: an event at a Liverpool Nightclub on 30 April and 1 May which hosted 3,000 people per night, a 5,000-capacity gig in Liverpool on 2 May, the Emirates FA Cup Final between Chelsea and Leicester City on 15 May which had 21,000 spectators just four days after The Brits and the Carabao Cup Final between Manchester City and Tottenham Hotspur on 25 April which had 4,000 spectators.

== Winners and nominees ==
Nominees for the Rising Star Award were announced on 11 March 2021 and the winner was announced on 19 March 2021. The nominees for the other categories were announced on 31 March 2021 by BBC Radio 1's DJ Nick Grimshaw and 2021 Rising Star Award winner Griff.

On 9 May 2021, it was announced that Taylor Swift would be awarded the Brits Icon Award (renamed the Global Icon for 2021) at the 2021 Brit Awards making her the first female artist and non-British artist to receive the award "in recognition of her immense impact on music across the world and incredible repertoire and achievements to date". Girl group Little Mix made history at the 2021 Brit Awards, when they became the first female group to receive the award for Best Group at the ceremony after 43 years since it was first introduced.

British Album of the Year (presented by Lewis Capaldi)	British Single (presented by Boy George)
Dua Lipa – Future Nostalgia; Arlo Parks – Collapsed in Sunbeams; Celeste – Not Your Muse; J Hus – Big Conspiracy; Jessie Ware – What's Your Pleasure?	Harry Styles – "Watermelon Sugar"; 220 Kid and Gracey – "Don't Need Love"; Aitch and AJ Tracey featuring Tay Keith – "Rain"; Dua Lipa – "Physical"; Headie One, AJ Tracey and Stormzy – "Ain't It Different"; Joel Corry featuring MNEK – "Head & Heart"; Nathan Dawe featuring KSI – "Lighter"; Regard and Raye – "Secrets"; S1mba featuring DTG – "Rover"; Young T & Bugsey featuring Headie One – "Don't Rush"
British Male Solo Artist (presented by Kurupt FM)	British Female Solo Artist (presented by Mabel and MNEK)
J Hus; AJ Tracey; Headie One; Joel Corry; Yungblud	Dua Lipa; Arlo Parks; Celeste; Jessie Ware; Lianne La Havas
British Group (presented by Adam Lambert and Olly Murs)	Breakthrough Artist (presented by Clara Amfo and Maya Jama)
Little Mix; The 1975; Bicep; Biffy Clyro; Young T & Bugsey	Arlo Parks; Bicep; Celeste; Joel Corry; Young T & Bugsey
International Male Solo Artist (presented by Michelle Obama)	International Female Solo Artist (presented by Annie Mac)
The Weeknd; Bruce Springsteen; Burna Boy; Childish Gambino; Tame Impala	Billie Eilish; Ariana Grande; Cardi B; Miley Cyrus; Taylor Swift
International Group (presented by Billy Porter)	Rising Star Award (presented by Celeste)
Haim; BTS; Fontaines D.C.; Foo Fighters; Run the Jewels	Griff; Pa Salieu; Rina Sawayama
Global Icon Award (presented by Maisie Williams)
Taylor Swift

== Controversies ==
For the 2021 ceremony, the British Phonographic Industry amended the rules regarding eligible of artists for the BRIT Awards, as well as the Mercury Prize which the BPI also run. The updated rules state that an artist and their music are eligible for nominations if they were born in the UK, are a UK passport holder (including individuals who hold more than one passport) or have lived in the UK for more than five years. The change was brought about by singer-songwriter Rina Sawayama who, despite living in the UK for twenty-six years was informed that she could not be nominated for either the Brits or the Mercury Prize because she was not a British citizen. Sawayama currently holds a Japanese passport in order to maintain ties with her family who still live there and, as per Japan's rules, is not allowed to hold dual-citizenship, leading fans to post "#SawayamaIsBritish" in protest. Sawayama met with representatives at the BPI to discuss the eligibility criteria and convinced them to expand it so that she and other artists like her could be nominated for the awards.

On 12 March 2021, three-time Brit Award-winning artist Sam Smith criticized the ceremony for continuing to use the gendered categories of British Male and British Female Solo Artist because they exclude those who do not fit into either of those categories. Smith, who came out as non-binary in 2019, called for change, stating that "the BRITs have been an important part of my career. Music for me has always been about unification not division. I look forward to a time where awards shows can be reflective of the society we live in. Let’s celebrate everybody, regardless of gender, race, age, ability, sexuality and class". In response, a spokesperson from the awards explained "Sam is an extraordinary British artist and we agree with what they have said today. The Brits are committed to evolving the show and the gendered categories are very much under review. But any changes made to be more inclusive need to be just that - if a change unintentionally leads to less inclusion then it risks being counterproductive to diversity and equality. We need to consult more widely before changes are made to make sure we get it right". On 22 November 2021, it was ultimately announced that gendered categories would no longer be used at the Brit Awards beginning in 2022.
