= Miss Me (MoStack song) =

Single by MoStack featuring AJ Tracey
- Released: 24 September 2020
- Length: 3:10
- Songwriters: Anthony Scott Bunbury, Montell Samuel Daley, Ché Wolton Grant

MoStack singles chronology
"Retail Thereapy" (2020)	"Miss Me" (2020)

AJ Tracey singles chronology
"Ain't It Different" (2020)	"Miss Me" (2020)	"One More Time" (2020)

Music video
- "Miss Me" on YouTube

"Miss Me" is a song by MoStack featuring AJ Tracey. It was released as a single in 2020 and peaked at number 39 on the UK Singles Chart. It was AJ Tracey and MoStack's second collaboration of the year after "Dinner Guest", a number four chart hit in June for the artists, although it was MoStack taking the lead position on this single, with Tracey a featured act.

== Production ==
Since their last collaboration, AJ Tracey had released another top 10 hit single "West Ten" featuring the vocal talents of Mabel and also teamed up with Headie One and Stormzy for "Ain't It Different", which has peaked at number 3. MoStack had also been busy, releasing "Retail Therapy" in collaboration with Fastlane Wez. This the fourth time AJ Tracey and Mostack have appeared on a single together in the past year - they were also a part of Steel Banglez's hit single "Fashion Week" and the 2019 top 40 single "Floss".

== Music video ==
The music video takes inspiration from several classic videos, including "Hey Ya!" by Outkast and "I Love It" by Kanye West and Lil Pump.

== Chart performance ==
The song entered the top 40 on its first week of release, starting off its chart run at number 39 on the UK Singles Chart, sandwiched between "Rain on Me" by Lady Gaga and Ariana Grande, and Machine Gun Kelly's latest release "Forget Me Too". It fell to number 79 the following week.

== Charts ==
Chart (2020)	Peak position
UK Singles (OCC)	39
