= Flu Game (album) =

Studio album by AJ Tracey
- Released: 16 April 2021
- Genre: British hip-hop; UK drill; afroswing; trap; R&B
- Length: 51:00
- Label: Revenge Records
- Producer: Nyge; 5ive Beatz; AJ Tracey; AOD; Fred Again; JBJ; Kazza; Mark Raggio; Pxcoyo; Remedee; Ryfy; Swidom; Take a Daytrip; the Elements; Venna; Yoz Beatz; Yung Swisher

AJ Tracey chronology
Secure The Bag! 2 (2020)	Flu Game (2021)	Don't Die Before You're Dead (2025)

Singles from Flu Game
- 1. "Dinner Guest" Released: 29 April 2020; 2. "West Ten" Released: 2 July 2020; 3. "Bringing It Back" Released: 4 February 2021; 4. "Anxious" Released: 4 March 2021; 5. "Little More Love" Released: 15 April 2021

Flu Game is the second studio album by British rapper AJ Tracey. It was released through Revenge Records on 16 April 2021. The album features guest appearances from Nav, Digga D, T-Pain, Kehlani, SahBabii, Millie Go Lightly, MoStack, and Mabel. The production is handled by AJ Tracey himself and executive producer Nyge, alongside The Elements, 5ive Beatz, AOD, Fred Again, Take a Daytrip, Pxcoyo, Yung Swisher, Kazza, Swidom, Yoz Beatz, Ryfy, Mark Raggio, Venna, and JBJ.

== Background ==
The title of the album refers to a 1997 game in the National Basketball Association during its finals in which American player Michael Jordan of the Chicago Bulls got food poisoning, but his team still won against the Utah Jazz. In an interview with NME, AJ Tracey explained what the album is focused on:

I feel like that's what [Michael Jordan] was all about. Even with him being ill with food poisoning, he can barely move, but he's dropping points that the other team wishes they could drop. [The album] is about when we go through hard times, but you have to always make sure you put your best foot forward and be great to try to break boundaries. That's what I'm about to release.

Tracey also praised Canadian rapper Nav, who is featured on the second track of the album, "Kukoč", admitting that he has been a long time fan of his music and described him as "dope", further explaining that "the fact that he's of [South] Asian descent... he's carved out that path and no one before him has really set the precedent for someone from his background". He also thought that he can get a little more "vulnerable" on the album and said that listeners would receive "more of an in-depth insight" of his life. Tracey started recording the album near the start of the COVID-19 pandemic, while having to deal with struggles with his family as his mother became ill, followed by his father becoming ill.

== Singles and promotion ==
AJ Tracey released the lead single of the album, "Dinner Guest", featuring fellow British rapper MoStack, on 29 April 2020. The second single, "West Ten", a collaboration with English singer-songwriter Mabel, was released on 2 July 2020. The third single, "Bringing It Back", a collaboration with fellow British rapper Digga D, was released on 4 February 2021. The fourth single, "Anxious", was released on 4 March 2021. "Little More Love" was released as the fifth and final single only one day before the album was released, on 15 April 2021.

On 22 March 2021, AJ Tracey announced the album and its complete details, along with a sketch press conference signing to a fictional basketball team called Revenge Athletic. He released sports-themed merchandise with hoodies, t-shirts and jerseys as promotion for Revenge Records and the album.

== Commercial performance ==
Flu Game debuted at number two on the UK Albums Chart and debuted atop the UK Independent Singles and Albums Chart and UK R&B Singles and Albums Chart, all charts by the Official Charts Company of AJ Tracey's home country of the United Kingdom.

== Critical reception ==
Professional ratings
Aggregate scores
Source	Rating
Metacritic	84/100
Review scores
Source	Rating
INews	3/5 stars
NME	4/5 stars

At Metacritic, which assigns a normalized rating out of 100 to reviews from mainstream publications, the album received an average score of 84, indicating "universal acclaim".

Kate Solomon of INews opined the album as "fiery" and claimed that it was "laden with basketball references" and figuratively described Tracey's goal and intentions for the album, stating that he would "overcome any obstacle, even sometimes a deadly virus, to succeed". Writing for NME, Dhruva Balram felt that Flu Game strengthens AJ Tracey's experimentation with different genres of music, calling him "one of an artist soaring above the rest of the country".

The reviews mainly focused on Tracey's versatility on the album, such as using alternative R&B on some songs.

== Track listing ==
Flu Game track listing
No.	Title	Writer(s)	Producer(s)	Length
1.	"Anxious"	Ché Grant	Remedee	2:41
2.	"Kukoč" (featuring Nav)	Grant; Navraj Goraya	Pxcoyo; Yung Swisher	3:15
3.	"Bringing It Back" (with Digga D)	Grant; Rhys Herbert	The Elements; AOD	3:12
4.	"Cheerleaders"	Grant	Kazza; Swidom	3:54
5.	"Draft Pick"	Grant	5ive Beatz	3:13
6.	"Eurostep"	Grant	AJ Tracey	2:45
7.	"Cherry Blossom"	Grant	Nyge; AOD	2:22
8.	"Glockie"	Grant	The Elements; AOD	3:35
9.	"Little More Love"	Grant	Yoz Beatz; Ryfy; Mark Raggio; Venna	2:40
10.	"Top Dog"	Grant	Nyge; AOD	3:20
11.	"Summertime Shootout" (featuring T-Pain)	Grant; Faheem Najm	Nyge; AOD	3:39
12.	"Perfect Storm"	Grant	Yoz Beatz; JBJ	2:59
13.	"Coupé" (featuring Kehlani)	Grant; Kehlani Parrish	The Elements	2:39
14.	"Numba 9" (featuring SahBabii and Millie Go Lightly)	Grant; Saaheem Valdery; Melissa Griffiths	The Elements	3:54
15.	"Dinner Guest" (featuring MoStack)	Grant; Montell Daley	The Elements; AJ Tracey	3:18
16.	"West Ten" (with Mabel)	Grant; Mabel McVey	Fred Again; Take a Daytrip	3:34
Total length:				51:00

== Charts ==
Chart performance for Flu Game
Chart (2021)	Peak position
Australian Albums (ARIA)	12
Belgian Albums (Ultratop Flanders)	121
Dutch Albums (Album Top 100)	61
Irish Albums (OCC)	5
New Zealand Albums (RMNZ)	36
Scottish Albums (OCC)	6
Swiss Albums (Schweizer Hitparade)	40
UK Albums (OCC)	2
UK Independent Albums (OCC)	1
UK R&B Albums (OCC)	1

== Certifications ==
Certifications for Flu Game
Region	Certification	Certified units/sales
United Kingdom (BPI)	Gold	100,000^{‡}
^{‡} Sales+streaming figures based on certification alone.
