= Lighter (Nathan Dawe song) =

2020 song by Nathan Dawe featuring KSI

Single by Nathan Dawe featuring KSI

from the EP If Heaven Had a Phone Line
- Released: 24 July 2020
- Studio: Milton Keynes, United Kingdom
- Genre: House, UK Garage
- Length: 3:02
- Label: Atlantic; Warner
- Songwriters: Nathan Dawe; Olajide Olatunji; Gabriella Henderson; Tre Jean-Marie; Jonny Lattimer
- Producers: Nathan Dawe; Tre Jean-Marie

Nathan Dawe singles chronology
"Flowers" (2019)	"Lighter" (2020)	"No Time for Tears" (2020)

KSI singles chronology
"Killa Killa" (2020)	"Lighter" (2020)	"Loose" (2020)

Music video
- "Lighter" on YouTube

Acoustic music video
- "Lighter (Acoustic)" on YouTube

"Lighter" is a song by British DJ and record producer Nathan Dawe featuring British YouTuber and rapper KSI, with vocals from British singer-songwriter Ella Henderson. It was released for digital download and streaming by Atlantic Records and Warner Music Group on 24 July 2020 as a standalone single. An upbeat, feel-good house track, its lyrics are about leaving a toxic relationship and feeling happy that the relationship has ended and not carrying a burden.

An accompanying music video was released on 24 July 2020. The light-hearted video stars Dawe and KSI among a cast, playing basketball and football. The group start out completely useless at both sports, though they improve as the video progresses. An acoustic version of "Lighter", which credits Henderson and features a new verse by KSI, was released on 28 August 2020 alongside an accompanying music video.

"Lighter" received positive reviews from music critics, who commonly praised the song's catchiness and KSI's energetic verse, and it was dubbed "one of the hits of the summer". The song peaked at number three on the UK Singles Chart and it further charted in eight other countries. "Lighter" was one of the UK's best-selling songs of 2020 and it has been certified platinum by the British Phonographic Industry (BPI) for exceeding sales of 600,000 units in the country. "Lighter" was nominated for the BRIT Award for Song of the Year at the 2021 ceremony.

== Writing and production ==
Ella Henderson wrote "Lighter" with British songwriters Tre Jean-Marie and Jonny Lattimer. The song was "ballady and slow" which "didn't fit her artist profile at the time". Henderson "had a lot of other releases planned and it wasn't really right for her". She sent the song to Nathan Dawe, who "sped it up, pitched the vocal up and completely transformed it". Henderson "thought it was sick and wished [Dawe] luck with it". Dawe and his management felt that "Lighter" should feature a verse from a British rapper, similar to his previous single "Flowers" (2019), which features British rapper Jaykae, leading to the decision to feature KSI on "Lighter". Dawe explained, "I've known of KSI for a long time and I've been quite a fan of his work... His music recently that's started to come out, the quality [of it has] been really good... I was listening to [his album] thinking, 'KSI's actually sick!' So I [asked] my manager, "What do you think? Would [KSI] work?' [My manager said], 'Let's reach out [to him].'" They sent the track to KSI, who listened to it and "thought it was an absolute banger" and agreed to "jump on it". KSI recalled, "When I heard [the song], I thought, 'This is a smash!' I knew instantly what I needed to do to elevate it to another level." KSI wrote a verse for "Lighter" at his home in London. He recalled that "it took [him] a couple of hours to write the verse". He recorded the verse at an arranged recording studio session which "took less than an hour". Dawe could not be present at the recording studio due to COVID-19 pandemic travel restrictions, but he spectated the session via Zoom.

== Music and lyrics ==
"Lighter"
A 23-second sample of the feel-good chorus, showcasing Ella Henderson's sped-up and pitched-up vocals and a piano-house drop.

"Lighter" is an upbeat house track. Henderson's vocals are sped-up and pitched-up. She sings about leaving a toxic relationship and feeling happy that the relationship has ended and not carrying a burden. The lyrics give inspiration to those who are struggling through a breakup, heartbreak, or even through losing a toxic person in their life, and feeling better despite the hard times. Henderson's chorus builds up to a piano-house drop. KSI's energetic rap verse is introduced in the break of the track, leading to "Lighter" being labelled as a crossover of house and rap. Dawe described "Lighter" as "a summer anthem [with] a feel-good vibe". The staff of Sport Playlists similarly described "Lighter" as an "anthemic slice of feel-good dance music" that was "written with summer in mind".

== Release and promotion ==
On 12 July 2020, Dawe announced via social media that he would soon be releasing a new single. The song's title, featured artist, cover art and release date were revealed three days later and "Lighter" was made available to pre-order on digital download services and pre-save on streaming services, alongside the release of a teaser trailer for the song. The cover art shows a photo of Dawe and KSI that was taken on the set of the song's music video shoot, in front of a red and white background. "Lighter" was released for digital download and streaming by Atlantic Records and Warner Music Group on 24 July 2020. An accompanying lyric video was released to Dawe's YouTube channel on the same day. The day after the release of "Lighter", Dawe and KSI performed the song during a live streamed launch party.

An acoustic version of "Lighter" was announced and made available to pre-order on 21 August 2020 and released one week later on 28 August 2020, alongside an accompanying music video. This version credits Henderson, unlike the original version of the song, and KSI performs a new verse. Several remixes of "Lighter" have been released; A remix by British singer-songwriter and record producer S-X, which features new verses by British rappers Big Zuu and Window Kid, was released on 4 September 2020. A remix by American DJ and record producer PS1 was released on 21 September 2020, while one by British DJ and record producer Shapes was released on 9 October 2020. Dawe, KSI and Henderson performed "Lighter" on BBC One's Top of the Pops New Year Special, which aired on 31 December 2020. The trio later performed the track during The KSI Show on 17 July 2021.

== Critical reception ==
"Lighter" was met with positive reviews from music critics. The staff of Sports Playlists liked the song's "infectious chorus" and they praised KSI's "memorable verse", which "[punctuates] the track’s bubbling, sugary melodies". They concluded that the song "[reaffirms Dawe's] position as one of the UK's biggest breakout producer talents of the [year]". Sean Evans of Back To The Movies claimed that the song "[shines] a light on an otherwise dark 2020". He acclaimed that KSI's verse is "well-constructed and perfectly matched to the song at hand". Evans praised KSI's "[evolution] as a lyricist" and found it "refreshing to see that some serious thought [had been] put into [his] words and their alternative meanings". Robin Murray of Clash called the song "a clinical banger for those looking to unload [COVID-19] lockdown energy" and proclaimed that it "could well be a summer smash [hit]". "Lighter" was dubbed "one of the hits of the summer" by the staff of Promonews.

== Music video ==
The music video for "Lighter" was directed by Troy Roscoe. It was filmed at two locations in London on 20 June 2020, across a 13-hour shoot. The music video was released to KSI's YouTube channel on 24 July 2020. KSI released a reaction video, in which he and Dawe watch and react to the music video, to YouTube one week later. A behind-the-scenes video of the music video shoot was released to Dawe's YouTube channel on 7 August 2020, followed by a bloopers video being released to KSI's YouTube channel one week later.

The music video opens with a cast, comprising Dawe, KSI, S-X and Window Kid, playing poker. But when an overconfident KSI goes all-in and comes a cropper, he is stung into challenging his fellow group members to compete at other sports, leading to the group playing basketball and football. The group, who are accompanied by a coach, start out completely useless at both sports, but their on-court skills start to improve upon the arrival of a young woman, with the group competing for her affection. The video ends with closing credits. The staff of Promonews described the music video as a "suitably light-hearted take on sporting achievement", which "captures the [group's] sporting incompetence like a big budget Nike [advert]" and "does a great job [at] showcasing KSI's big personality and the camaraderie among the group". Reflecting on the music video shoot, Dawe said, "It was a genuinely fun project. It was just a jokes day. All the reactions on camera [were genuine]. It was genuine fun. And that's what makes the video match the song."

== Commercial performance ==
In the United Kingdom, "Lighter" was the country's most downloaded song in its first week of release. It earned the highest new entry on the UK Singles Chart, debuting at number four, becoming both artists' first song to reach the top five. It spent eight weeks inside the top five, peaking at number three for four of those weeks, and spent a total of 22 weeks on the chart. The song also peaked at number two on the UK Dance Singles Chart. The Official Charts Company reported that "Lighter" was the UK's 40th highest-selling and 32nd most-downloaded song of 2020, as well as the country's fifth highest-selling dance song of 2020. On 1 January 2021, "Lighter" was certified platinum by the British Phonographic Industry (BPI) for sales of 600,000 track-equivalent units in the UK. On 4 March 2021, Music Week reported that "Lighter" has sold 671,884 track-equivalent units in the country.

In Ireland, "Lighter" debuted at number 17 on the Irish Singles Chart. The song peaked at number eight in its sixth week of release, becoming both artists' first song to reach the top 10, and spent a total of 18 weeks on the chart. Elsewhere in Europe, "Lighter" charted in Belgium, Croatia, the Czech Republic, and Hungary. In the United States, the song debuted at number 18 on the Hot Dance/Electronic Songs chart and spent a total of eight weeks on the chart. On 12 May 2021, Staffordshire Live reported that "Lighter" has received more than 136 million global streams.

== Awards and nominations ==
Awards and nominations for "Lighter"
Year	Award	Category	Result	Ref.
2020	Amazon Music UK	Best Song	Won	
2021	The BRIT Awards	Best British Single	Nominated	

== Credits and personnel ==
Credits adapted from Tidal.

- Nathan Dawe – production, songwriting, programming
- KSI – songwriting, vocals
- Ella Henderson – songwriting, vocals
- Tre Jean-Marie – production, songwriting, bass, drums, engineering, mixing, piano, programming, synthesizer
- Jonny Lattimer – songwriting
- Adam Lunn – engineering
- Kevin Grainger – mastering

== Charts ==
=== Weekly charts ===
Weekly chart performance for "Lighter"
Chart (2020)	Peak position
Belgium (Ultratop Flanders Dance)	48
Croatia (HRT)	49
Czech Republic Airplay (ČNS IFPI)	37
Poland (Polish Airplay Top 100)	42
Euro Digital Song Sales (Billboard)	3
Global Excl. US (Billboard)	178
Hungary (Single Top 40)	15
Ireland (IRMA)	8
New Zealand Hot Singles (RMNZ)	17
Scotland Singles (OCC)	1
UK Singles (OCC)	3
UK Dance (OCC)	2
US Hot Dance/Electronic Songs (Billboard)	18

=== Year-end charts ===
2020 year-end chart performance for "Lighter"
Chart (2020)	Position
UK Singles (OCC)	40
UK Download (OCC)	32
UK Dance (OCC)	5

== Certifications ==
Certifications for "Lighter"
Region	Certification	Certified units/sales
New Zealand (RMNZ)	Gold	15,000^{‡}
United Kingdom (BPI)	Platinum	600,000^{‡}
^{‡} Sales+streaming figures based on certification alone.

== Release history ==
Release dates and formats for "Lighter"
Region	Date	Format(s)	Version	Label(s)	Ref.
Various	24 July 2020	Digital download; streaming	Original	Atlantic; Warner	
United Kingdom	24 July 2020	Contemporary hit radio	Original	Atlantic; Warner	
Various	28 August 2020	Digital download; streaming	Acoustic	Atlantic; Warner	
Various	4 September 2020	Digital download; streaming	S-X Remix	Atlantic; Warner	
Various	21 September 2020	Digital download; streaming	PS1 Remix	Atlantic; Warner	
Various	9 October 2020	Digital download; streaming	Shapes Remix	Atlantic; Warner	

== See also ==
- List of UK top-ten singles in 2020
- List of UK Singles Downloads Chart number ones of the 2020s
- List of Scottish Singles and Albums Charts number ones in 2020
- List of top 10 singles in 2020 (Ireland)
