= Greece (song) =

2020 single by DJ Khaled featuring Drake

Single by DJ Khaled featuring Drake

from the album Khaled Khaled
- A-side: "Popstar"
- Released: July 17, 2020
- Recorded: 2020
- Genre: Hip hop
- Length: 3:39
- Label: OVO; We the Best; Epic
- Songwriters: Khaled Khaled; Aubrey Graham; Ozan Yildirim; Calvin Tarvin; Elijah Maynard; Peter Eddins
- Producers: OZ; Tiggi

DJ Khaled singles chronology
"Important" (2020)	"Greece" / "Popstar" (2020)	"Sunshine (The Light)" (2021)

Drake singles chronology
"Toosie Slide" (2020)	"Greece" / "Popstar" (2020)	"Only You Freestyle" (2020)

"Greece" (stylized in all caps) is a song by American musician DJ Khaled, featuring Canadian rapper Drake. It was released on July 17, 2020, simultaneously with their other collaboration "Popstar", as the dual lead singles from Khaled's twelfth studio album, Khaled Khaled. The songs marked the reunion between Khaled and Drake, who collaborated on various songs since 2010. Both tracks were produced by frequent Drake collaborator OZ. Critics deemed "Greece" a "luxurious" song, comparing Drake's vocals to fellow Canadian singer the Weeknd.

"Greece" peaked at number three on the Canadian Hot 100. Outside Canada, the song topped the charts in Greece, peaked within the top ten of the charts in New Zealand, the United Kingdom and the United States, the top twenty of the charts in Switzerland and the top forty of the charts in Australia, Austria, Belgium (Flanders), Germany and Ireland.

== Background ==
In August 2019, Swiss record producer OZ released a 40-second video on Instagram, showcasing a new project he had been working on. The video featured the same beat later used on "Greece", together with vocals in German by OZ himself. He accompanied the video with the description "oz - greece" and the hashtag #SOLOCAREER. This sparked rumors that the producer, who had previously never come into the spotlight as a lyricist, would release the song as his first fully independent music project. The German lyrics heard in OZ's original release are very similar in meaning and vocal melody to those later used by Drake on the final song. The original video by OZ was later removed from Instagram.

Speculation of a new DJ Khaled and Drake song first arose in January 2020, when Khaled flew to Drake's hometown Toronto. After spending time together in the studio, Khaled stated "It's amazing what you can get done in 24 hours". On May 1, Drake previewed the record during a livestream on Instagram. In June, both Drake and Khaled teased the collaboration by captioning various posts with emojis of an owl and a key, the owl being the mascot of Drake's OVO label and the key unofficially standing for DJ Khaled. Khaled further revealed that "the first single been ready" and confirmed that he was working on a new album. After fans inundated Khaled with questions on the Drake references, he said fans would have to wait a little longer for new music, but did not confirm any music with Drake. The track then leaked in early July.

On July 15, two days before the song's release, Khaled announced his 12th studio album would be titled Khaled Khaled. The announcement was accompanied with a video trailer documenting his life and career, including the birth of his sons, and winning his first Grammy Award. He also announced two songs would be released on July 17, "Greece" and "Popstar", both featuring Drake. DJ Khaled and Drake have collaborated various times, first in 2009 with "Fed Up", and during the 2010s, on "I'm on One" (2011), "No New Friends" (2013), "For Free" (2016) and "To the Max" (2017).

== Production ==
Shortly after the release of the song, OZ explained the production process: "He [co-producer Tiggi] sent me a sample and I flipped his sample to make it more uptempo and clubby. I did the drums and then sent it to Drake. He had the beat and we didn't know he was going to do something. A couple of weeks went by, and he sent the first idea back. From there, we knew it was about to be crazy. The vocals don't sound like the other songs he has with me. I think Noel [Cadastre, Drake's record engineer] did Drake's vocals. We started the song last fall and went back-and-forth on the production side." OZ previously produced Drake's "Toosie Slide" (2020) and several tracks on his 2020 mixtape, Dark Lane Demo Tapes.

== Composition ==
"Greece" is a "lavish", "luxurious" song, with Drake promising his lover trips around the world, vacations in Greece, and living a wealthy lifestyle. Drake brings more romance to the track, briefly singing in French. He employs high-pitched vocals throughout the song, and showcases his artistry, switching from singing and rapping from chorus to verse. Drake's "digitally sweetened" vocals were likened to Nav's sound, with a "faint echo" of Drake's song "Dreams Money Can Buy". Comparisons were also drawn to the Weeknd.

== Critical reception ==
The song received mixed to positive reviews from critics. Ross Goldenberg of Dancing Astronaut complimented Drake and DJ Khaled's "tried-and-true formula", and said "Drake flexes his witty lyricism [...] and hits the higher notes for the radio". The New York Times's Jon Caramanica was less favorable, stating the song "feels more like a notion than a fully formed song, an ambiguous experiment in texture". Rolling Stone's Charles Holmes said while the song lacks innovation, "there's at least a sense of honed pop craftsmanship on display". Complex's Jessica McKinney called the song a contender for the Song of the Summer title. Eric Skelton of the same magazine had a differing opinion, saying the song only tries to live up to expectations: "Both of these songs will sound fine playing out of bluetooth speakers at the pool, but they're each missing the spark that made true summer hits like 'I'm on One', 'One Dance' and 'In My Feelings' so inescapable when the weather got warm".

== Music video ==
A visualizer was released along with the song, featuring an animated owl with a gold key in its mouth, flying over Greece. An official video is yet to be released. However, in June 2020, DJ Khaled posted a screenshot of a FaceTime call with Director X, who previously directed Drake's videos for "Hotline Bling", "Life Is Good", and "Work", possibly alluding to the song's video.

== Chart performance ==
"Greece" and "Popstar" debuted at numbers eight and three on the Billboard Hot 100, respectively, becoming Drake's record-extending 24th and 25th debuts in the Hot 100's top 10. It also marked his 39th and 40th Hot 100 top ten entries, breaking Madonna's 18-year record.

== Personnel ==
- Drake – vocals
- DJ Khaled – vocals
- Ozan "OZ" Yildirim - production
- Calvin "Tiggi" Tarvin - co-production
- Elijah Maynard – lyrics
- Peter Eddins - lyrics
- Noah "40" Shebib – mix engineering
- Noel Cadastre - record engineering
- Juan "AyoJuan" Pena - vocal engineering

== Charts ==
=== Weekly charts ===
Chart (2020)	Peak position
Australia (ARIA)	35
Austria (Ö3 Austria Top 40)	27
Belgium (Ultratip Bubbling Under Flanders)	10
Canada Hot 100 (Billboard)	3
France (SNEP)	129
Germany (GfK)	28
Global 200 (Billboard)	38
Greece (IFPI)	1
Ireland (IRMA)	14
Netherlands (Single Top 100)	71
New Zealand Hot Singles (RMNZ)	2
Portugal (AFP)	41
Scottish Singles Sales (Official Charts)	55
Sweden (Sverigetopplistan)	73
Switzerland (Schweizer Hitparade)	11
UK Singles (Official Charts)	8
US Billboard Hot 100	8
US Hot R&B/Hip-Hop Songs (Billboard)	6
US Rhythmic Airplay (Billboard)	14
US Rolling Stone Top 100	4

=== Year-end charts ===
Chart (2020)	Position
Canada (Canadian Hot 100)	85
Switzerland (Schweizer Hitparade)	58
UK Singles (OCC)	85
US Hot R&B/Hip-Hop Songs (Billboard)	62

== Certifications ==
Region	Certification	Certified units/sales
Australia (ARIA)	Platinum	70,000^{‡}
Austria (IFPI Austria)	Gold	15,000^{‡}
Brazil (Pro-Música Brasil)	Gold	20,000^{‡}
Denmark (IFPI Danmark)	Gold	45,000^{‡}
France (SNEP)	Gold	100,000^{‡}
Germany (BVMI)	Gold	200,000^{‡}
New Zealand (RMNZ)	Platinum	30,000^{‡}
Portugal (AFP)	Gold	5,000^{‡}
Switzerland (IFPI Switzerland)	Gold	10,000^{‡}
United Kingdom (BPI)	Platinum	600,000^{‡}
United States (RIAA)	2× Platinum	2,000,000^{‡}
Streaming
Greece (IFPI Greece)	Platinum	2,000,000^{†}
^{‡} Sales+streaming figures based on certification alone.^{†} Streaming-only figures based on certification alone.
