= Did You Miss Me? =

Did You Miss Me? may refer to:

- "Did You Miss Me?" (song), a cover of "Hello, Hello, I'm Back Again"
- "Did You Miss Me?" (Pretty Little Liars), an episode of the TV series Pretty Little Liars
