= Only You Freestyle =

2020 single by Headie One and Drake

Single by Headie One and Drake

from the album Edna
- Released: 20 July 2020
- Recorded: 2020
- Genre: UK drill
- Length: 4:09
- Label: Relentless; OVO
- Songwriters: Irving Adjei; Aubrey Graham
- Producer: M1onthebeat

Headie One singles chronology
| "Rose Gold" (2020) | "Only You Freestyle" (2020) | "Impress Me" (2020) |

Drake singles chronology
| "Greece" / "Popstar" (2020) | "Only You Freestyle" (2020) | "Laugh Now Cry Later" (2020) |

Music video
- "Only You Freestyle" on YouTube

"Only You Freestyle" is a song by written and performed by British rapper Headie One and Canadian rapper Drake, released on 20 July 2020 by Relentless Records and OVO Sound. It served as the lead single to the former's debut studio album, Edna (2020).

== Background ==
The song was announced and teased the day before release via social media by the two artists. Commenting on the collaboration, Drake stated: "I had to go hard, especially on a track with one of the best drill artists in the world. Scratch that—the best drill artist in the world."

"Only You Freestyle" is a UK drill track produced by M1onthebeat, who "gives the pair an eerie backdrop laden with drilly 808s and lurching bass for them to deliver their barrage of crud talk and bravado." It is the third drill-styled track released by Drake in 2020, following "War" and "Demons" from his commercial mixtape, Dark Lane Demo Tapes (2020).

== Critical reception ==
Complex complimented the production by M1onthebeat, writing that the producer "uses just a few key elements to huge effect—an ethereal vocal harmony here, some clicking 808s there and a shuddering bass line throughout—all of it coming together for a mood that's grand and cinematic in its scope. Like all good drill instrumentals though, the crucial part is that it holds back just enough to let the bars take the limelight."

== Music video ==
A music video directed by Nathan James Tettey and Theo Skudra was released alongside the song on 20 July 2020 via Headie One's YouTube channel. Drake performs his verse in a parking lot accompanied by OVO affiliates, with Headie One performing in a dimly-lit building. Artwork was created by British artist MLDNCM.

== Charts ==
| Chart (2020) | Peak position |
|---|---|
| Australia (ARIA) | 51 |
| Belgium (Ultratip Bubbling Under Flanders) | 24 |
| Canada Hot 100 (Billboard) | 37 |
| Ireland (IRMA) | 13 |
| Netherlands (Single Top 100) | 54 |
| New Zealand Hot Singles (RMNZ) | 6 |
| Scotland Singles (OCC) | 76 |
| Switzerland (Schweizer Hitparade) | 75 |
| UK Singles (OCC) | 5 |
| US Bubbling Under Hot 100 (Billboard) | 18 |

== Certifications ==
| Region | Certification | Certified units/sales |
|---|---|---|
| Canada (Music Canada) | Gold | 40,000^{‡} |
| New Zealand (RMNZ) | Gold | 15,000^{‡} |
| United Kingdom (BPI) | Platinum | 600,000^{‡} |
^{‡} Sales+streaming figures based on certification alone.

== Release history ==
Release history for "Only You Freestyle"
| Region | Date | Format | Label | Ref. |
|---|---|---|---|---|
| Various | 8 May 2020 | Digital download; streaming | Relentless; OVO | |
