= Don't Need Love (220 Kid and Gracey song) =

Single by 220 Kid and Gracey

from the album The Art of Closure
- Released: 13 December 2019
- Genre: House
- Length: 3:15
- Label: Polydor
- Songwriter(s): Christopher Michael Lee; Grace Barker; Joseph Bobula; Matthew Cozzi
- Producer(s): Cameron Gower Poole; Sam Brennan; Will Graydon

220 Kid singles chronology
| "Let Me Stay" (2019) | "Don't Need Love" (2019) | "Too Many Nights" (2020) |

Gracey singles chronology
| "Easy for You" (2019) | "Don't Need Love" (2019) | "Alone in My Room (Gone)" (2020) |

"Don't Need Love" is a song by English musicians 220 Kid and Gracey, released on 13 December 2019 on Polydor Records. The song peaked at number 9 on the UK Singles Chart in 2020. The song is included on Gracey's debut mini-album, The Art of Closure (2020). Commercially successful in the UK, the song has been certified Platinum by the British Phonographic Industry and received a nomination for Song of the Year at the 41st Brit Awards.

== Charts ==
=== Weekly charts ===
| Chart (2020) | Peak position |
|---|---|
| Ireland (IRMA) | 9 |
| Scotland (OCC) | 13 |
| UK Singles (OCC) | 9 |
| UK Dance (OCC) | 1 |
| US Dance/Electronic Songs (Billboard) | 41 |

=== Year-end charts ===
| Chart (2020) | Position |
|---|---|
| Ireland (IRMA) | 45 |
| UK Singles (OCC) | 45 |

== Certifications ==
| Region | Certification | Certified units/sales |
|---|---|---|
| United Kingdom (BPI) | Platinum | 600,000^{‡} |
^{‡} Sales+streaming figures based on certification alone.

== See also ==
- List of top 10 singles in 2020 (Ireland)
- List of Platinum singles in the United Kingdom awarded since 2000
- List of UK Dance Singles Chart number ones of 2020
- List of UK top-ten singles in 2020
