= Tick Tock (Clean Bandit and Mabel song) =

2020 single by Clean Bandit and Mabel

Single by Clean Bandit and Mabel featuring 24kGoldn
- Released: 21 August 2020
- Genre: Dance-pop; hip house; electropop; pop; tropical house
- Length: 2:58
- Label: Atlantic
- Songwriters: Jack Patterson; Grace Chatto; Mabel McVey; Camille Purcell; Golden Landis Von Jones
- Producers: Mark Ralph; Jack Patterson; Grace Chatto

Clean Bandit singles chronology
"Caution (Remix)" (2020)	"Tick Tock" (2020)	"Higher" (2021)

Mabel singles chronology
"West Ten" (2020)	"Tick Tock" (2020)	"Let Them Know" (2021)

24kGoldn singles chronology
"Belt" (2020)	"Tick Tock" (2020)	"Me Gusta (Remix)" (2020)

Music video
- "Tick Tock" on YouTube

"Tick Tock" is a song by English electronic music group Clean Bandit and English singer Mabel featuring American rapper 24kGoldn. It was written by the vocalists alongside Kamille and group members Grace Chatto and Jack Patterson, the latter two producing the song with Mark Ralph. It was released by Atlantic Records UK on 21 August 2020. The song is also included as a bonus track on digital and streaming versions of Mabel's debut studio album, High Expectations.

== Background ==
In a Zoom interview with ITN, the group revealed that they had started writing the song in November 2019, and that the song was finished just before the lockdown due to the COVID-19 pandemic. "It's been a mad process finishing it during this time," said Jack Patterson. "And even making the video when it was still lockdown situation, and working in that environment was quite crazy." He also praised both collaborators on the song, saying that they have been "so nice to work with and just made it super easy". Grace Chatto said that the group did not meet 24kGoldn in person, as he was in Los Angeles at the time, and they did everything remotely, including the filming of his part in the music video.

Chatto explained in another interview with the Daily Star that the song is about being "obsessed" with a guy. "We wrote it just before the pandemic and I was feeling a little obsessed with a guy – you know that annoying thing where you don't wanna be obsessed but you are? And if I find myself in that situation I do something I love and something which makes me feel satisfied in another way. In lockdown I enjoyed going for walks. I found being in nature makes you see the bigger picture again."

Whilst some have suggested that the song may be inspired by the video-sharing social networking service TikTok, Jack Patterson has denied this in an interview with the Metro, and reiterated that the song is about "an obsessive relationship".

== Release ==
On 17 August 2020, Grace Chatto of Clean Bandit announced the song through a video posted on the group's social media pages. "Our new single is ready, it's called 'Tick Tock' and features Mabel and 24kGoldn, it's out this Friday," she said. "We are so excited for you to hear it!" The single's cover art was also revealed in the Instagram post. Mabel and 24kGoldn replied to the post with a smiling face with hearts emoji and "let's goooo", respectively. Mabel also posted a short video of her lip-syncing to the song on her social media pages.

An acoustic version of the song and an acoustic video was released on 4 September 2020.

== Music video ==
Directed solely by Clean Bandit, the official video for "Tick Tock" premiered at 1 pm BST on 21 August 2020, after a 30-second trailer was released one day prior. It takes place at a house that resembles a cuckoo clock in the middle of a forest of glaciers. It also features a bathtub full of popcorn, as well as cardboard cities with running trains surrounding various music instruments, such as drums and digital pianos.

While the song is about obsessive relationships, the music video takes a slightly different direction. Jack Patterson said that they took a lighter approach and made the video about their own individual obsessions. "I have a Hornby model of a Eurostar train spinning around me. I love all types of transport," said Patterson.

== Live performances ==
On 29 August 2020, Clean Bandit and Mabel performed the song live during the final of the fourth series of The Voice Kids UK.

== Track listing ==
- Digital download and streaming
1. "Tick Tock" (featuring 24kGoldn) – 2:58
- Digital download and streaming – acoustic
1. "Tick Tock" (acoustic) – 3:08
- Digital download and streaming – Joel Corry remix
1. "Tick Tock" (featuring 24kGoldn) (Joel Corry remix) – 2:39
- Digital download and streaming – Sam Feldt remix
1. "Tick Tock" (featuring 24kGoldn) (Sam Feldt remix) – 2:34
- Digital download and streaming – UK mix
1. "Tick Tock" (featuring S1mba) (UK mix) – 2:58
- Digital download and streaming – VIP remix
1. "Tick Tock" (featuring Beenie Man and Konshens) (VIP remix) – 3:00
- Digital download and streaming – Topic remix
1. "Tick Tock" (featuring 24kGoldn) (Topic remix) – 2:32

== Personnel ==
Credits adapted from Tidal.

Original version

- Grace Chatto – production
- Jack Patterson – production
- Mark Ralph – production
- Mabel – vocals

Acoustic version

- Ashton Miranda – production
- Benjamin Totten – production
- Thomas Totten – production
- Mabel – vocals

== Charts ==
=== Weekly charts ===
Chart (2020–2021)	Peak position
Argentina Hot 100 (Billboard)	74
Australia (ARIA)	61
Austria (Ö3 Austria Top 40)	53
Belgium (Ultratip Bubbling Under Flanders)	3
Belgium (Ultratop 50 Wallonia)	8
CIS Airplay (TopHit)	80
Croatia International Airplay (Top lista)	2
Czech Republic Airplay (ČNS IFPI)	2
Czech Republic Singles Digital (ČNS IFPI)	88
Euro Digital Song Sales (Billboard)	7
France (SNEP)	76
Germany (GfK)	48
Global 200 (Billboard)	99
Greece International (IFPI)	86
Hungary (Dance Top 40)	3
Hungary (Rádiós Top 40)	18
Hungary (Single Top 40)	39
Ireland (IRMA)	13
Israel (Media Forest)	11
Italy (FIMI)	33
Lebanon (Lebanese Top 20)	9
Lithuania (AGATA)	79
Mexico Airplay (Billboard)	50
Netherlands (Dutch Top 40)	12
Netherlands (Single Top 100)	27
New Zealand Hot Singles (RMNZ)	16
Poland Airplay (ZPAV)	4
Romania (Airplay 100)	21
Russia Airplay (TopHit)	91
San Marino Airplay (SMRTV Top 50)	1
Scottish Singles Sales (Official Charts)	4
Slovakia Airplay (ČNS IFPI)	7
Slovakia Singles Digital (ČNS IFPI)	85
Slovenia Airplay (SloTop50)	7
Sweden (Sverigetopplistan)	94
Switzerland (Schweizer Hitparade)	17
UK Singles (Official Charts)	8
US Hot Dance/Electronic Songs (Billboard)	10

=== Year-end charts ===
Chart (2020)	Position
Hungary (Dance Top 40)	35
Netherlands (Dutch Top 40)	60
Poland (Polish Airplay Top 100)	67
US Hot Dance/Electronic Songs (Billboard)	48

Chart (2021)	Position
Belgium (Ultratop Wallonia)	99
Hungary (Dance Top 40)	31
Hungary (Rádiós Top 40)	41
US Hot Dance/Electronic Songs (Billboard)	45

== Certifications ==
Region	Certification	Certified units/sales
Belgium (BRMA)	Gold	20,000^{‡}
Denmark (IFPI Danmark)	Gold	45,000^{‡}
France (SNEP)	Platinum	200,000^{‡}
Italy (FIMI)	Platinum	70,000^{‡}
New Zealand (RMNZ)	Gold	15,000^{‡}
Poland (ZPAV)	Platinum	50,000^{‡}
Portugal (AFP)	Gold	5,000^{‡}
Spain (Promusicae)	Gold	30,000^{‡}
United Kingdom (BPI)	Platinum	600,000^{‡}
^{‡} Sales+streaming figures based on certification alone.

== Release history ==
Region	Date	Format	Version	Label	Ref.
Various	21 August 2020	Digital download; streaming	Original	Atlantic	
Italy	21 August 2020	Contemporary hit radio	Original	Warner	
United Kingdom	29 August 2020	Adult contemporary	Original	Warner	
Various	4 September 2020	Digital download; streaming	Acoustic	Atlantic	
United Kingdom	11 September 2020	Contemporary hit radio	Original	Warner	
Various	11 September 2020	Digital download; streaming	Joel Corry remix	Atlantic	
Various	25 September 2020	Digital download; streaming	Sam Feldt remix	Atlantic	
Various	16 October 2020	Digital download; streaming	UK mix	Atlantic	
Various	19 October 2020	Digital download; streaming	VIP remix	Atlantic	
Various	23 October 2020	Digital download; streaming	Topic remix	Atlantic	
