= West Ten =

2020 song by AJ Tracey and Mabel

Single by AJ Tracey and Mabel

from the album Flu Game
- Released: 2 July 2020
- Genre: UK garage
- Length: 3:33
- Label: AJ Tracey
- Songwriters: Ché Grant; Fred Gibson; Camille Purcell; Mabel McVey; Denzel Baptiste; David Biral
- Producers: Fred Again; Take a Daytrip

AJ Tracey singles chronology
"Dinner Guest" (2020)	"West Ten" (2020)	"Ain't It Different" (2020)

Mabel singles chronology
"Boyfriend" (2020)	"West Ten" (2020)	"Tick Tock" (2020)

Music video
- "West Ten" on YouTube

"West Ten" is a song by English rapper AJ Tracey and singer Mabel. It was released as a digital download on 2 July 2020 as the second single off the former's second studio album Flu Game (2021). The song was written by Tracey, Fred Again, Camille Purcell, Mabel and Take a Daytrip, and is included on the digital & streaming versions of Mabel's debut studio album High Expectations (2019). It was a commercial hit, peaking at number five on the UK Singles Chart and reaching the top of the UK Dance Chart.

== Background ==
Tracey first teased the collaboration by sharing an animated clip of him playing Pac-Man along with an unidentified companion, he said, "Can you guess who this is playing games with me? We just made a banger and wanna share it with you lot." The post was then removed. On 29 June 2020, Mabel shared a screenshot from the AJ Tracey video which included an iMessage from Tracey which reads, "We dropping this tune or what?!" She also tagged Tracey in the accompanying caption. Tracey then replied, "Is it that time?"

== Music video ==
A music video to accompany the release of "West Ten" was first released onto YouTube on 2 July 2020. The music video was directed by Oliver Jennings.

== Charts ==
=== Weekly charts ===
Chart (2020)	Peak position
Belgium (Ultratip Bubbling Under Flanders)	39
Ireland (IRMA)	16
New Zealand Hot Singles (RMNZ)	20
Scottish Singles Sales (Official Charts)	21
UK Singles (Official Charts)	5
UK Dance (Official Charts)	1
UK Indie (Official Charts)	1

=== Year-end charts ===
Chart (2020)	Position
UK Singles (OCC)	64

== Certifications ==
Region	Certification	Certified units/sales
New Zealand (RMNZ)	Gold	15,000^{‡}
United Kingdom (BPI)	Platinum	600,000^{‡}
^{‡} Sales+streaming figures based on certification alone.

== Release history ==
Region	Date	Format	Label
Various	2 July 2020	Digital download; streaming	Self-released

== Personnel ==
Credits adapted from Tidal.

- Fred Again – producer, writer
- Take a Daytrip – producer, writer
- AJ Tracey – writer
- Kamille – writer
- Mabel – writer
- Jay Reynolds – mixer
