= Laugh Now Cry Later =

2020 single by Drake featuring Lil Durk

Single by Drake featuring Lil Durk
- Released: August 14, 2020
- Genre: Hip hop; trap
- Length: 4:21
- Label: Republic; OVO
- Songwriters: Aubrey Graham; Durk Banks; Ronald LaTour, Jr.; Rogét Chahayed; Ryan Martinez; Daveon Jackson; Bryan Yepes
- Producers: Cardo; Chahayed; G. Ry; Yung Exclusive; Bryan Yepes

Drake singles chronology
"Only You Freestyle" (2020)	"Laugh Now Cry Later" (2020)	"Twist & Turn" (2020)

Lil Durk singles chronology
"Painless 2" (2020)	"Laugh Now Cry Later" (2020)	"Eat (Remix)" (2020)

Music video
- "Laugh Now Cry Later" on YouTube

"Laugh Now Cry Later" is a song by Canadian rapper Drake featuring American rapper Lil Durk. It was released through Republic Records and OVO Sound as a single on August 14, 2020. The two artists wrote the song alongside producers Cardo, Rogét Chahayed, G. Ry, Bryan Yepes and Yung Exclusive. It was originally the intended lead single from Drake's sixth studio album, Certified Lover Boy (2021).

Commercially, the song debuted at number one in Drake's native Canada on the Canadian Hot 100 and debuted at number two on the US Billboard Hot 100. The song received nominations for Best Melodic Rap Performance and Best Rap Song at the 63rd Annual Grammy Awards.

== Background ==
On August 12, 2020, Drake posted a clip of himself and another person riding jet skis at night on his social media. The post was accompanied by the caption "TMRW MIDNIGHT 🤍". Upon release, it turned out that the song's music video also entailed an upcoming collaboration between Drake and Nike, Inc.

== Critical reception ==
Jeremy D. Larson of Pitchfork praised Drake's delivery, calling the song "one of the lightest and breeziest Drake songs to come out in a while". He further described his presence as "effortlessly cool and simple", while "Lil Durk shows up as a perfect counterpart". Complex thought the song was "a vibe, but not an obvious hit record", neither a "by-the-numbers pop radio play or a hard-hitting club record". According to Charles Holmes at Rolling Stone, the song "sounds like Drake featuring Drake", further explaining that the song "is the embodiment of what happens when you surround real Drake with a room full of past Drakes, like a tortured Canadian reboot of Being John Malkovich". Lil Wayne released a version of the song on his No Ceilings 3 mixtape called Something Different which also had a music video.

== Music video ==
The song's official music video was released on August 13, 2020, and was directed by Dave Meyers. It was shot at Nike's headquarters in Beaverton, Oregon, thus receiving criticism for advertising the company and resembling a commercial. The video features shots predominantly of Drake engaging in different sporting activities: boxing underwater (as a reference to Muhammad Ali), running on a treadmill in Nike's sports-science lab, and going on a shopping spree in a closed down Nike store with Instagrammer Aggyabby, as well as Durk and Drake riding jet skis and Drake posing in oversized white, and cream colored suits with Durk (as a reference to LeBron James). The video also includes several cameos from athletes, including Kevin Durant, Odell Beckham Jr., and Marshawn Lynch, as well as internet comedian Druski & noted shoe designer Ben Nethongkome.

== Personnel ==
Credits adapted from Tidal.

- Drake – lead vocals, songwriting
- Lil Durk – featured vocals, songwriting
- Cardo - songwriting, production
- Alex Torrez - songwriting
- Allen Ponce - songwriting
- Bryan Yepes - songwriting, production
- G. Ry - songwriting, production
- Yung Exclusive - songwriting, production
- Rogét Chahayed - songwriting, production
- Noel Cadastre – recording
- Noah "40" Shebib – mixing
- Chris Athens – mixing
- Turn Me Up Josh - Engineering
- Nick Rice - Recording Engineer
- Zack Shochet - Assistant Engineer
- JusVibes - Assistant Engineer

== Charts ==
=== Weekly charts ===
Weekly chart performance for "Laugh Now Cry Later"
Chart (2020–2021)	Peak position
Argentina Hot 100 (Billboard)	83
Australia (ARIA)	3
Austria (Ö3 Austria Top 40)	19
Belgium (Ultratop 50 Flanders)	47
Belgium (Ultratip Bubbling Under Wallonia)	3
Canada Hot 100 (Billboard)	1
Czech Republic Singles Digital (ČNS IFPI)	57
Denmark (Tracklisten)	20
France (SNEP)	50
Germany (GfK)	25
Global 200 (Billboard)	5
Hungary (Single Top 40)	33
Hungary (Stream Top 40)	21
Iceland (Tónlistinn)	14
Ireland (IRMA)	5
Italy (FIMI)	59
Netherlands (Dutch Top 40 Tipparade)	8
Netherlands (Single Top 100)	22
New Zealand (Recorded Music NZ)	3
Norway (VG-lista)	9
Portugal (AFP)	10
Romania (Airplay 100)	55
Scotland Singles (OCC)	42
Singapore (RIAS)	18
Slovakia Singles Digital (ČNS IFPI)	36
Spain (PROMUSICAE)	86
Sweden (Sverigetopplistan)	14
Switzerland (Schweizer Hitparade)	5
UK Singles (OCC)	4
UK Hip Hop/R&B (OCC)	2
US Billboard Hot 100	2
US Adult Pop Airplay (Billboard)	37
US Hot R&B/Hip-Hop Songs (Billboard)	1
US Pop Airplay (Billboard)	7
US Rhythmic Airplay (Billboard)	1
US Rolling Stone Top 100	1

=== Year-end charts ===
Year-end chart performance for "Laugh Now Cry Later"
Chart (2020)	Position
Canada (Canadian Hot 100)	48
Hungary (Stream Top 40)	90
Switzerland (Schweizer Hitparade)	100
US Billboard Hot 100	41
US Hot R&B/Hip-Hop Songs (Billboard)	20
US Rhythmic (Billboard)	22

Chart (2021)	Position
Canada (Canadian Hot 100)	59
Global 200 (Billboard)	131
Portugal (AFP)	143
US Billboard Hot 100	45
US Hot R&B/Hip-Hop Songs (Billboard)	26
US Rhythmic (Billboard)	7

== Certifications ==
Certifications for "Laugh Now Cry Later"
Region	Certification	Certified units/sales
Australia (ARIA)	3× Platinum	210,000^{‡}
Brazil (Pro-Música Brasil)	Diamond	160,000^{‡}
Canada (Music Canada)	4× Platinum	320,000^{‡}
Denmark (IFPI Danmark)	Gold	45,000^{‡}
France (SNEP)	Gold	100,000^{‡}
Italy (FIMI)	Gold	35,000^{‡}
New Zealand (RMNZ)	2× Platinum	60,000^{‡}
Poland (ZPAV)	Gold	25,000^{‡}
Portugal (AFP)	Platinum	10,000^{‡}
United Kingdom (BPI)	Platinum	600,000^{‡}
United States (RIAA)	6× Platinum	6,000,000^{‡}
Streaming
Greece (IFPI Greece)	Gold	1,000,000^{†}
^{‡} Sales+streaming figures based on certification alone.^{†} Streaming-only figures based on certification alone.
