= Dinner Guest =

Single by AJ Tracey featuring MoStack

from the album Flu Game
- Released: 29 April 2020
- Genre: Afroswing, hip house
- Length: 3:33
- Label: AJ Tracey
- Songwriters: AJ Tracey; MoStack; The Elements
- Producers: AJ Tracey; The Elements

AJ Tracey singles chronology
"Rain" (2020)	"Dinner Guest" (2020)	"West Ten" (2020)

MoStack singles chronology
"Floss" (2019)	"Dinner Guest" (2020)	"Way Too Long" (2021)

Music video
- "Dinner Guest" on YouTube

"Dinner Guest" is a song recorded by British rapper, singer, songwriter and record producer AJ Tracey featuring British rapper MoStack. It was released as a single on 29 April 2020 as the lead single from the former's second studio album Flu Game (2021). The song peaked at number 5 on the UK Singles Chart, spending a total of 12 weeks in the top ten. The song features a sample of "Push the Feeling On" by Nightcrawlers.

== Production ==
The song was written in January 2020 and saw a collaboration in production between AJ Tracey and The Elements. As a result of the COVID-19 pandemic, Tracey announced that all first week download profits from sales of "Dinner Guest" would be donated to the COVID-19 Urgent Appeal to support NHS staff and volunteers. This followed his appearance on the BBC Radio 1 charity single "Times Like These", which topped the chart and also raised money for the NHS.

Tracey used a sample of "Push the Feeling On" by Scottish house music producers Nightcrawlers as the hook for the song. It was one of two songs released in 2020 to sample "Push the Feeling On", the other being "House Party" by Mist featuring Fredo.

== Chart performance ==
"Dinner Guest" entered the top 10 on its first week of release, making its bow at number 8. It hovered between positions 8 to 10 for six weeks before rising to number 6 and finally its peak of number five on the chart week ending 25 June 2020.

== Charts ==
=== Weekly charts ===
Chart (2020)	Peak position
Ireland (IRMA)	13
Scottish Singles Sales (Official Charts)	31
UK Singles (Official Charts)	5
UK Independent (Official Charts)	1
UK Hip Hop/R&B (Official Charts)	4

=== Year-end charts ===
Chart (2020)	Position
UK Singles (OCC)	37

== Certifications ==
Region	Certification	Certified units/sales
New Zealand (RMNZ)	Gold	15,000^{‡}
United Kingdom (BPI)	Platinum	600,000^{‡}
^{‡} Sales+streaming figures based on certification alone.
