= Ain't It Different =

Single by Headie One, AJ Tracey and Stormzy

from the album Edna
- Released: 20 August 2020
- Genre: Drill
- Length: 3:16
- Label: Relentless; Sony
- Songwriters: Ché Grant; Anthony Kiedis; Camille Purcell; Chad Smith; Fred Gibson; Gary Jackson; Irving Adjei; John Frusciante; Marion Hall; Michael Balzary; Michael Omari; Steven "Lenky" Marsden; Toddla T
- Producers: Fred; Michael Beinhorn; Toddla T

Headie One singles chronology
"Impress Me" (2020)	"Ain't It Different" (2020)	"Breathing" (2020)

AJ Tracey singles chronology
"West Ten" (2020)	"Ain't It Different" (2020)	"Miss Me" (2020)

Stormzy singles chronology
"Real Life" (2020)	"Ain't It Different" (2020)	"Flavour" (2020)

Music video
- "Ain't It Different" on YouTube

"Ain't It Different" is a song by British rappers Headie One, AJ Tracey and Stormzy. It was released on 20 August 2020 as the second single from Headie One's debut studio album Edna and peaked at number two on the UK Singles Chart, becoming the highest-charting single for both Headie One and AJ Tracey. The song was nominated for the Brit Award for Song of the Year at the 2021 ceremony.

== Composition ==
The song sees the rappers "trade assertive, straight-talking bars that touch on how life is different now to what it was back in the day when they had a lot less". It samples M-Dubs' "Bump 'n' Grind (I Am Feeling Hot Tonight)" (1999) and Red Hot Chili Peppers' "Pretty Little Ditty" (1989), the latter of which was also famously sampled by Crazy Town for their 2001 single "Butterfly". The song also interpolates Lady Saw's "No Long Talking" (1996). Sonically, the song was described as "a slow-burning drill banger".

== Remix ==
On 25 September 2020, Australian rap collective Onefour released a remix version of the song, which they had previously teased on social media. A remix with Luciano and Condcta was also released.

== Music video ==
The accompanying music video was released on 20 August 2020 and was directed by Taz Tron Delix. It is set in three locations: a botanical garden, the back of a Benz truck, as well as the streets of London, with a Headie One statue towering over the rappers.

== Charts ==
=== Weekly charts ===
Chart (2020)	Peak position
Australia (ARIA)	16
Austria (Ö3 Austria Top 40)	60
Belgium (Ultratip Bubbling Under Flanders)	16
Belgium (Ultratip Bubbling Under Wallonia)	36
Germany (GfK)	53
Ireland (IRMA)	5
Netherlands (Single Top 100)	52
New Zealand Hot Singles (RMNZ)	4
Scotland Singles (OCC)	8
Switzerland (Schweizer Hitparade)	65
UK Singles (OCC)	2

=== Year-end charts ===
Chart (2020)	Position
UK Singles (OCC)	51

== Certifications ==
Region	Certification	Certified units/sales
Australia (ARIA)	Platinum	70,000^{‡}
Austria (IFPI Austria)	Gold	15,000^{‡}
Denmark (IFPI Danmark)	Gold	45,000^{‡}
New Zealand (RMNZ)	Platinum	30,000^{‡}
United Kingdom (BPI)	Platinum	600,000^{‡}
^{‡} Sales+streaming figures based on certification alone.
