= Rain (Aitch and AJ Tracey song) =

2020 song by Aitch and AJ Tracey featuring Tay Keith

Single by Aitch and AJ Tracey featuring Tay Keith

from the EP Polaris
- Released: 6 March 2020
- Genre: Hip-hop; trap
- Length: 3:05
- Producer: Tay Keith

AJ Tracey singles chronology
"Kiss and Tell" (2019)	"Rain" (2020)	"Dinner Guest" (2020)

Aitch singles chronology
"Mice" (2020)	"Rain" (2020)	"Raw" (2020)

Music video
- "Rain" on YouTube

"Rain" is a song by British rappers AJ Tracey and Aitch, featuring production credits from American musician Tay Keith. The song was released on 6 March 2020 peaked at number 3 on the UK Singles Chart. The song was nominated for the Brit Award for Song of the Year at the 2021 ceremony.

== Music video ==
The music video was filmed in Los Angeles and was shot by acclaimed director Arrad.

== Release ==
The song was premiered on BBC Radio 1 as Annie Mac's 'Hottest Record in the World' and on BBC 1Xtra as DJ Target's 'Target Embargo'. AJ Tracey also dropped the hook for the song on the social platform Triller prior to the radio premiere.

== Chart performance ==
"Rain" reached number 3 on its first week of release, becoming the highest new entry behind "Blinding Lights" by The Weeknd and "Roses" by Saint Jhn. It also topped the Official UK Trending Chart on its release week, reflecting the songs that were popular online, on the radio and other media. The song went on to spend 3 weeks in the top ten and a total of 14 weeks in the top 40.

== Charts ==
=== Weekly charts ===
Weekly chart performance for "Rain"
Chart (2020)	Peak position
Australia (ARIA)	61
Ireland (IRMA)	10
Scotland Singles (OCC)	23
UK Singles (OCC)	3
UK Hip Hop/R&B (OCC)	3

=== Year-end charts ===
Year-end chart performance for "Rain"
Chart (2020)	Position
Ireland (IRMA)	49
UK Singles (OCC)	32

== Certifications ==
Certifications for "Rain"
Region	Certification	Certified units/sales
Australia (ARIA)	Platinum	70,000^{‡}
Denmark (IFPI Danmark)	Gold	45,000^{‡}
New Zealand (RMNZ)	Platinum	30,000^{‡}
United Kingdom (BPI)	2× Platinum	1,200,000^{‡}
^{‡} Sales+streaming figures based on certification alone.
