= 220 Kid =

English record producer and DJ

- Also known as: Willie the Kid; William Edward
- Born: William Edward Graydon; 8 May 1989 (age 37); Oxfordshire, England
- Origin: London
- Genres: Dance-pop; dance
- Occupations: Record producer; DJ
- Years active: 2019–present
- Labels: Polydor; Two Six

William Edward Graydon (born 8 May 1989), known professionally as 220 Kid (pronounced "two-twenty kid" and stylised in all caps), is an English record producer, DJ and remix artist. He gained recognition in 2019 with his song "Don't Need Love" with Gracey which peaked at number 9 in 2020, his remix of Nathan Evans' "Wellerman" with Billen Ted reached the top spot in 2021. He is based in Highbury, London.

== Early life ==
William Edward Graydon was born on 8 May 1989 in Oxfordshire. His father Ken, former music manager for Bee Gees member Robin Gibb, named Graydon after seeing a number plate ending in WEG from a hospital window. He grew up in Thame and attended Magdalen College School, going on to study at the University of Exeter, where he graduated with a bachelor's degree in biosciences followed by a master's degree in sustainable development. Following the George Floyd protests in 2020, he set up a three-year scholarship for a high-achieving BAME student studying at his alma mater. He has dyslexia. He has a sister named Charlie working in the healthcare industry.

220 Kid's stage name originated from a charity effort where he ran 220 miles (350 km), a distance corresponding to nine marathons, over seven days. The run was completed in 2013 on the Isle of Man in honour of Gibb and supported three medical charities. After moving to London, he initially used the stage name "Willie the Kid" (named after the cowboy) without realising it was already the name of an existing artist. He previously had jobs working for marketing company CPM Group, as a model in Singapore, as a carpenter, and at a Tesco grocery store.

== Career ==
Prior to embarking on a solo career, Graydon went by the name "William Edward" and was a member of pop duo OMYO—an acronym for "Our Music Your Opinion"—alongside Tom McCorkell while living in Thame. The pair met on New Year's Eve in 2014 at the James Figg pub in Thame and made a bet to write a song together. They wrote a few songs over the span of several days, including "Lady", which was used in an advert by clothing retailer New Look. After being dropped by a major record label, they formed their own independent one; their debut single "Days with You" was released on Two Six Records in 2017, with its music video shot in New York City. Their first gig was supporting Drake at the Wireless Festival and their debut album was planned for September 2017.

Graydon's first song as a solo artist under the moniker "220 Kid" was "Lights" in 2018, which was a shift from OMYO's urban pop to electronic music. Follow-up singles "Pleasure to Love You" and "Let Me Stay" both featured vocalist Chilli Chilton. 220 Kid signed with Polydor Records in 2019. His debut single with the label was "Don't Need Love", a collaboration with English singer Gracey, which was released in December 2019. The song went on to reach the top ten of the UK Singles Chart, peaking at number nine in July 2020, and received a nomination for British Single at the 2021 Brit Awards. His follow-up single, "Too Many Nights" with Northern Irish singer JC Stewart, was released in September 2020, peaking at number 74 in the UK. He lists the Bee Gees, Timbaland, and Motown artists as a few of his musical influences. In December 2025, promoter Billy McFarland posted on Instagram that he was arranging for 220 Kid to perform on an island.

== Discography ==
=== Studio albums ===
- Yellow Butterflies (2026)

=== DJ mixes ===
- D4 D4NCE: 220 Kid in the Mix (2022)
- Cr2 Live & Direct: 220 Kid (DJ Mix) (2024)

=== Singles ===
List of singles, with selected chart positions and certifications, showing year released
Title	Year	Peak chart positions			Certifications	Album
Title	Year	UK	AUT	IRL	Certifications	Album
"Lights" (featuring Remy)	2018	—	—	—		Non-album singles
"Pleasure to Love You" (featuring Chilli Chilton)	2018	—	—	—		Non-album singles
"Let Me Stay" (featuring Chilli Chilton)	2019	—	—	—		Non-album singles
"Don't Need Love" (with Gracey)	2019	9	—	9	BPI: Platinum	The Art of Closure
"Too Many Nights" (with JC Stewart)	2020	74	—	56	BPI: Silver	Non-album singles
"Wellerman" (Nathan Evans, 220 Kid and Billen Ted)	2021	1	1	2	BPI: Gold; IFPI AUT: Platinum	Non-album singles
"Unconditional" (with Dillon Francis featuring Bryn Christopher)	2021	—	—	—		Happy Machine
"Stupid Feelings" (with LANY)	2021	—	—	—		gg bb xx
"I'll Take You Down" (featuring Chilli Chilton)	2021	—	—	—		Non-album singles
"Another Life" (with Jem Cooke)	2022	—	—	—		Non-album singles
"Release" (with Ásdís)	2022	—	—	—		Non-album singles
"Lose Control" (with S1mba)	2022	—	—	—		Non-album singles
"See in Color" (with Wax Motif)	2022	—	—	—		Non-album singles
"Somebody New" (with YouNotUs featuring Jordan Shaw)	2022	—	—	—		Non-album singles
"Look Where We Are" (with Kang Daniel and Willim)	2023	—	—	—		Non-album singles
"Wake 'n' Shake" (with AR/CO)	2023	—	—	—		Non-album singles
"Let You Down"	2023	—	—	—		Non-album singles
"If This Isn't Love" (with Jack Wins and Caitlyn Scarlett)	2023	—	—	—		Non-album singles
"Heart & Soul"	2023	—	—	—		Non-album singles
"Good Love"	2023	—	—	—		Non-album singles
"Lay Low" (with Toby Romeo and Izzy Bizu)	2023	—	—	—		Non-album singles
"Feel Good" (with KOLIDESCOPES)	2024	—	—	—		Non-album singles
"Reverse Cowgirl" (with VAVO)	2024	—	—	—		Non-album singles
"Sleep Alone" (featuring Justin Jesso)	2025	—	—	—		Yellow Butterflies
"Get To Love You" (featuring LP)	2025	—	—	—		Yellow Butterflies
"Trust Issues" (featuring Destiny Rogers)	2025	—	—	—		Yellow Butterflies
"Hold On For Heaven"	2026	—	—	—		Yellow Butterflies
"—" denotes a recording that did not chart or was not released.

=== Remixes ===
List of remixes, showing year released
Title	Year	Artist
"1984"	2019	Alexander Wood
"Honest"	2020	San Holo featuring Broods
"Better Off Without You"	2020	Becky Hill and Shift K3Y
"Boyfriend"	2020	Mabel
"I Need You to Hate Me"	2020	JC Stewart
"To Be Young"	2020	Anne-Marie featuring Doja Cat
"Holiday"	2020	Little Mix
"The Business"	2020	Tiësto
"Deal with It"	2021	Ashnikko featuring Kelis
"Summer 91 (Looking Back)"	2021	Noizu
"Lost"	2021	Jake Bugg
"Chemical"	2021	MK
"Hopeless Romantic"	2022	Sam Fischer
"Entertain Me"	2022	Ylona Garcia
"No One Dies from Love"	2022	Tove Lo
"Moving On"	2023	Arizona
"Time After Time"	2023	Pascal Letoublon and Ilira
"Live More & Love More"	2023	Cat Burns
"Nice to Know You"	2024	Lovelytheband

== See also ==
- List of artists who reached number one in Austria
- List of artists who reached number one on the Dutch Top 40
- List of artists who reached number one on the UK Singles Chart
- List of artists who reached number one on the UK Singles Downloads Chart
- List of Polydor Records artists
