= Stormzy discography =

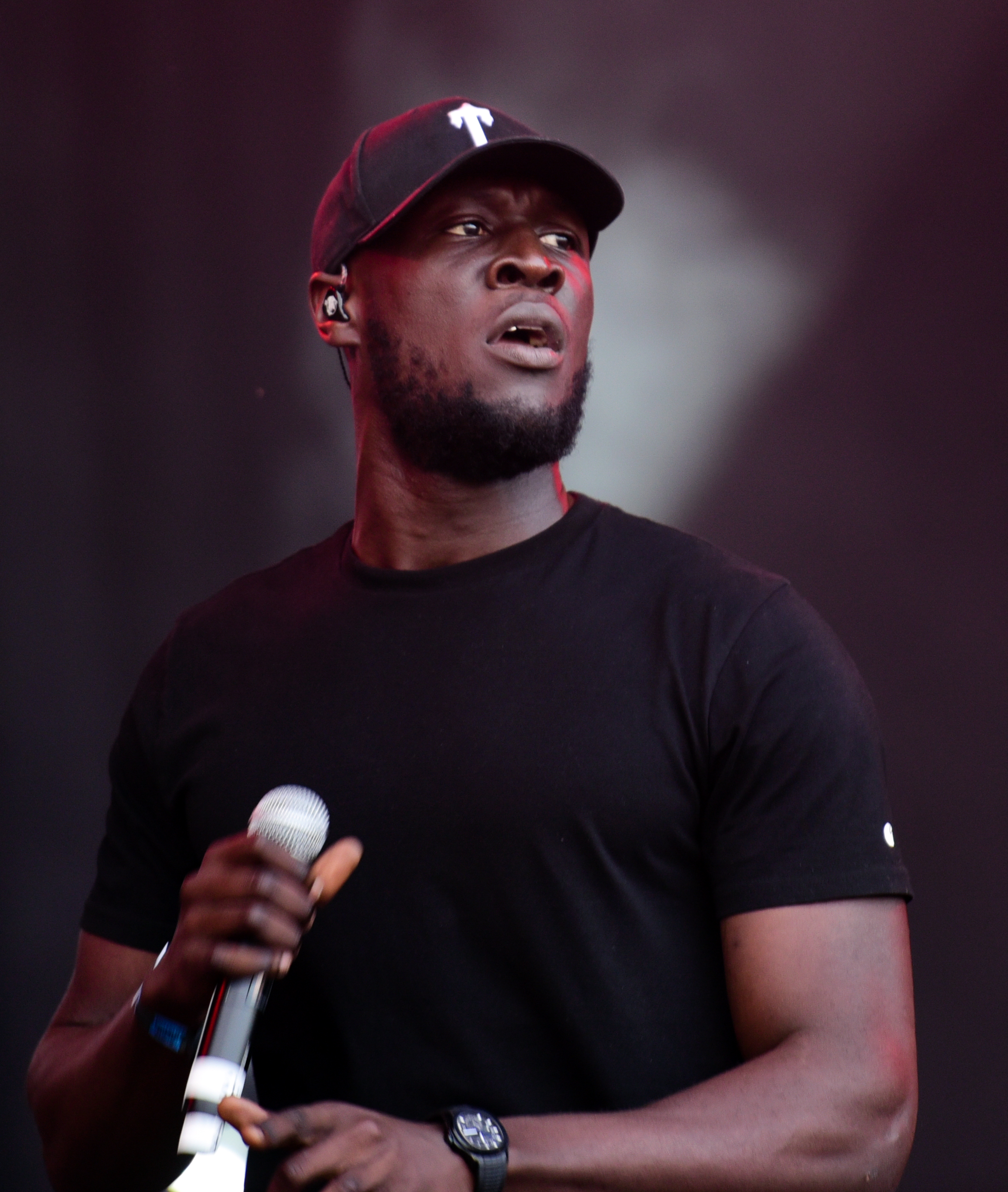
- Stormzy in 2019
- Studio albums: 3
- EPs: 2
- Singles: 22
- Mixtapes: 1

British rapper Stormzy has released three studio albums, one mixtape, two extended plays and twenty-one singles as a lead artist. His debut studio album, Gang Signs & Prayer, was released in February 2017 and peaked at number one on the UK Albums Chart. It spawned four top 40 singles, most notably "Big for Your Boots", which peaked at number six on the UK Singles Chart. His second studio album, Heavy Is the Head, was released in December 2019 and peaked at number one on the UK Albums Chart. It spawned four top 40 singles, most notably "Vossi Bop", which peaked at number one on the UK Singles Chart, making it his first number one single in the UK.

== Studio albums ==
List of studio albums, with selected details, chart positions and certifications
Title	Details	Peak chart positions										Sales	Certifications
Title	Details	UK	AUS	CAN	DEN	IRE	NLD	NOR	NZ	SWE	SWI	Sales	Certifications
Gang Signs & Prayer	Released: 24 February 2017; Label: #Merky, Atlantic; Formats: CD, LP, digital download, streaming	1	11	91	12	1	25	22	14	34	38	UK: 429,833	BPI: 2× Platinum; IFPI DEN: Gold
Heavy Is the Head	Released: 13 December 2019; Label: #Merky, Atlantic; Formats: CD, LP, digital download, streaming	1	11	57	6	3	10	13	20	34	29	UK: 300,000	BPI: Platinum; IFPI DEN: Platinum
This Is What I Mean	Released: 25 November 2022; Label: #Merky, 0207 Def Jam; Formats: CD, LP, digital download, streaming	1	72	—	25	10	48	—	40	40	35		BPI: Silver
"—" denotes a recording that did not chart or was not released in that territory.

== Mixtapes ==
Title	Details
168: The Mixtape	Released: 20 March 2013; Format: Free digital download

== Extended plays ==
Title	Details
Not That Deep (with The HeavyTrackerz)	Released: 20 June 2014; Format: Digital download
Dreamers Disease	Released: 20 July 2014; Format: Digital download

== Singles ==
=== As lead artist ===
Title	Year	Peak chart positions										Certifications	Album
Title	Year	UK	AUS	CAN	DEN	IRE	NLD	NOR	NZ	SWE	SWI	Certifications	Album
"Know Me From"	2015	49	—	—	—	—	—	—	—	—	—	BPI: Gold	Non-album singles
"WickedSkengMan 4"	2015	18	—	—	—	—	—	—	—	—	—	BPI: Silver	Non-album singles
"Dude" (with Lethal Bizzle)	2015	49	—	—	—	—	—	—	—	—	—		Non-album singles
"Scary"	2016	169	—	—	—	—	—	—	—	—	—	BPI: Silver	Non-album singles
"Birthday Girl"	2016	—	—	—	—	—	—	—	—	—	—	BPI: Silver	Non-album singles
"Big for Your Boots"	2017	6	—	—	—	20	—	—	— (Note: "Big for Your Boots" did not enter the NZ Top 40 Singles Chart, but peaked at number nine on the NZ Heatseeker Singles Chart.)	—	—	BPI: 2× Platinum; RMNZ: Gold	Gang Signs & Prayer
"Cold"	2017	21	—	—	—	59	—	—	—	—	—	BPI: Gold	Gang Signs & Prayer
"Cigarettes & Cush" (featuring Kehlani)	2017	30	—	—	—	79	—	—	— (Note: "Cigarettes & Cush" did not enter the NZ Top 40 Singles Chart, but peaked at number eight on the NZ Heatseeker Singles Chart.)	—	—	BPI: Gold	Gang Signs & Prayer
"Blinded by Your Grace, Pt. 2" (featuring MNEK)	2017	7	—	—	—	43	—	—	—	—	—	BPI: 2× Platinum; RMNZ: Gold	Gang Signs & Prayer
"Vossi Bop"	2019	1	34	—	30	4	—	—	34	10	—	BPI: 3× Platinum; ARIA: 3× Platinum; GLF: 2× Platinum; IFPI DEN: Platinum; RMNZ: 2× Platinum	Heavy Is the Head
"Crown"	2019	4	—	—	—	6	—	—	— (Note: "Crown" did not enter the NZ Top 40 Singles Chart, but peaked at number 15 on the NZ Hot Singles Chart.)	—	—	BPI: Platinum; RMNZ: Gold	Heavy Is the Head
"Sounds of the Skeng"	2019	20	—	—	—	33	—	—	— (Note: "Sounds of the Skeng" did not enter the NZ Top 40 Singles Chart, but peaked at number 26 on the NZ Hot Singles Chart.)	—	—	BPI: Silver	Non-album single
"Wiley Flow"	2019	22	—	—	—	30	—	—	— (Note: "Wiley Flow" did not enter the NZ Top 40 Singles Chart, but peaked at number 21 on the NZ Hot Singles Chart.)	—	—	BPI: Platinum; RMNZ: Platinum	Heavy Is the Head
"Own It" (featuring Ed Sheeran and Burna Boy)	2019	1	40	82	11	2	25	26	— (Note: "Own It" did not enter the NZ Top 40 Singles Chart, but peaked at number four on the NZ Hot Singles Chart.)	30	27	BPI: 3× Platinum; ARIA: Gold; IFPI DEN: Platinum; RMNZ: Platinum	Heavy Is the Head
"Audacity" (featuring Headie One)	2019	6	—	—	—	8	—	—	—	—	—	BPI: Gold; RMNZ: Gold	Heavy Is the Head
"Disappointed"	2020	—	—	—	—	—	—	—	—	—	—		Non-album singles
"Still Disappointed"	2020	21	—	—	—	32	—	—	— (Note: "Still Disappointed" did not enter the NZ Top 40 Singles Chart, but peaked at number 39 on the NZ Hot Singles Chart.)	—	—	BPI: Silver	Non-album singles
"Flavour" (with Loski)	2020	43	—	—	—	92	—	—	—	—	—		Music, Trial & Trauma: A Drill Story
"Mel Made Me Do It"	2022	12	—	—	—	25	— (Note: "Mel Made Me Do It" did not enter the Single Top 100, but peaked at number 17 on the Dutch Single Tip chart.)	—	— (Note: "Mel Made Me Do It" did not enter the NZ Top 40 Singles Chart, but peaked at number seven on the NZ Hot Singles Chart.)	— (Note: "Mel Made Me Do It" did not enter the Swedish Singellista Chart, but peaked at number 18 on the Swedish Heatseeker Chart.)	—		Non-album single
"Hide & Seek" (solo or remix featuring Flo)	2022	7	—	—	—	11	— (Note: "Hide & Seek" did not enter the Single Top 100, but peaked at number two on the Dutch Single Tip chart.)	—	— (Note: "Hide and Seek" did not enter the NZ Top 40 Singles Chart, but peaked at number six on the NZ Hot Singles Chart.)	56	—	BPI: Platinum; RMNZ: Gold	This Is What I Mean
"Firebabe"	2022	5	—	—	—	72	—	—	— (Note: "Firebabe" did not enter the NZ Top 40 Singles Chart, but peaked at number 26 on the NZ Hot Singles Chart.)	—	—	BPI: Silver	This Is What I Mean
"Toxic Trait" (featuring Fredo)	2023	11	—	—	—	31	—	—	— (Note: "Toxic Trait" did not enter the NZ Top 40 Singles Chart, but peaked at number 11 on the NZ Hot Singles Chart.)	—	—	BPI: Silver	TBA
"The Weekend" (with Raye)	2023	23	—	—	—	48	—	—	— (Note: "The Weekend" did not enter the NZ Top 40 Singles Chart, but peaked at number 15 on the NZ Hot Singles Chart.)	—	—	BPI: Silver; RMNZ: Gold	TBA
"Problems Over Peace" (with AP Dhillon)	2024	—	—	—	—	—	—	—	— (Note: "Problems Over Peace" did not enter the NZ Top 40 Singles Chart, but peaked at number 34 on the NZ Hot Singles Chart.)	—	—		TBA
"Backbone" (with Chase & Status)	2024	1	36	—	—	54	—	—	3	—	—	BPI: Platinum; RMNZ: 2× Platinum	TBA
"Sorry Rach!"	2025	—	—	—	—	—	—	—	—	—	—		TBA
"Hold Me Down"	2025	—	—	—	—	—	—	—	—	—	—		TBA
"24 Hours" (with Odeal)	2026	—	—	—	—	—	—	—	—	—	—		TBA
"—" denotes a recording that did not chart or was not released in that territory.

=== As featured artist ===
Title	Year	Peak chart positions										Certifications	Album
Title	Year	UK	AUS	DEN	GER	IRE	LAT	LIT	NLD	NZ	SWE	Certifications	Album
"I'm Fine" (Chip featuring Stormzy and Shalo)	2014	—	—	—	—	—	—	—	—	—	—		Believe & Achieve EPisode 1
"TRKRZ" (The HeavyTrackerz featuring P Money, Newham Generals, Stormzy, Big Narstie, Flirta D, Youngs Teflon and Desperado)	2015	—	—	—	—	—	—	—	—	—	—		Non-album single
"Hear Dis" (Chip featuring Stormzy)	2015	199	—	—	—	—	—	—	—	—	—		Rap vs. Grime
"Out Here" (Tanika featuring Stormzy)	2016	—	—	—	—	—	—	—	—	—	—		Out Here EP
"Ambition" (Raye featuring Stormzy)	2016	—	—	—	—	—	—	—	—	—	—		SECOND
"My Hood" (Ray BLK featuring Stormzy)	2016	—	—	—	—	—	—	—	—	—	—		Durt
"Aldrig Igen (må sådär)" (Cherrie featuring Stormzy)	2016	—	—	—	—	—	—	—	—	—	—	GLF: Platinum	Sherihan
"5ive" (Solo 45 featuring Stormzy)	2017	—	—	—	—	—	—	—	—	—	—		Non-album single
"All Time Low (Remix)" (Jon Bellion featuring Stormzy)	2017	—	—	—	—	—	—	—	—	—	—		The Human Condition
"Power" (Little Mix featuring Stormzy)	2017	6	—	—	—	17	—	—	—	—	—	BPI: 2× Platinum; RMNZ: Platinum	Glory Days: The Platinum Edition
"Bridge over Troubled Water" (as part of Artists for Grenfell)	2017	1	53	—	—	25	—	—	—	—	—	BPI: Gold	Non-album single
"Momma's Prayer" (JP Cooper featuring Stormzy)	2017	—	—	—	—	—	—	—	—	—	—		Raised Under Grey Skies
"Let Me Down" (Jorja Smith featuring Stormzy)	2018	34	—	—	—	62	—	—	—	—	—	BPI: Gold	Non-album single
"Shine Girl" (MoStack featuring Stormzy)	2019	13	—	—	—	64	—	—	—	—	—	BPI: Silver	Stacko
"Take Me Back to London" (Ed Sheeran featuring Stormzy)	2019	1	29	26	68	7	22	79	69	29	44	BPI: 3× Platinum; MC: Gold; RMNZ: Platinum	No. 6 Collaborations Project
"I Dunno" (Tion Wayne featuring Dutchavelli and Stormzy)	2020	7	—	—	—	30	—	—	—	—	—	BPI: Platinum; RMNZ: Gold	Non-album single
"Real Life" (Burna Boy featuring Stormzy)	2020	54	—	—	—	—	—	—	—	—	—	BPI: Silver	Twice as Tall
"Ain't It Different" (Headie One featuring AJ Tracey and Stormzy)	2020	2	—	16	—	5	53	—	—	—	—	BPI: 2× Platinum; ARIA: Platinum; RMNZ: Platinum	Edna
"Plus jamais" (Aya Nakamura featuring Stormzy)	2020	—	—	—	—	—	—	—	—	—	—		Aya
"Skengman" (Ghetts featuring Stormzy)	2021	50	—	—	—	—	—	—	—	— (Note: "Skengman" did not enter the NZ Top 40 Singles Chart, but peaked at number 38 on the NZ Hot Singles Chart.)	—		Non-album single
"Clash" (Dave featuring Stormzy)	2021	2	29	—	—	8	—	—	—	— (Note: "Clash" did not enter the NZ Top 40 Singles Chart, but peaked at number six on the NZ Hot Singles Chart.)	— (Note: "Clash" did not enter the Sverigetopplistan, but peaked at number 19 on the Swedish Heatseeker chart.)	BPI: 2× Platinum; ARIA: Platinum; RMNZ: Platinum	We're All Alone in This Together
"Life & Money" (Stonebwoy featuring Stormzy)	2023	—	—	—	—	—	—	—	—	—	—		Non-album single
"Cry No More" (Headie One featuring Stormzy)	2024	33	—	—	—	—	—	—	—	—	—		The Last One
"Easier Done Than Said" (Jvck James featuring Stormzy)	2025	—	—	—	—	—	—	—	—	— (Note: "Easier Done Than Said" did not enter the NZ Top 40 Singles Chart, but peaked at number 36 on the NZ Hot Singles Chart.)	—		Non-album single
"—" denotes a recording that did not chart or was not released in that territory.

=== Promotional singles ===
Title	Year	Peak chart positions			Certifications	Album
Title	Year	AUT	GER	SWI	Certifications	Album
"Good Goodbye" (Linkin Park featuring Pusha T and Stormzy)	2017	69	65	49	BPI: Silver	One More Light
"Longevity Flow"	2023	—	—	—		Non-album singles
"Angel in the Marble"	2023	—	—	—		Non-album singles

== Other charted and certified songs ==
Title	Year	Peak chart positions					Certifications	Album
Title	Year	UK	UK R&B	UK Ind.	IRE	NZ Hot	Certifications	Album
"Shut Up" (Note: The song was released independently for digital download in the United Kingdom on 11 September 2015 as the B-side to the "WickedSkengMan 4" single.)	2015	8	1	3	79	—	BPI: 2× Platinum; IFPI DEN: Gold; RMNZ: Platinum	Gang Signs & Prayer
"Bad Boys" (featuring Ghetts and J Hus)	2017	22	3	3	—	—	BPI: Silver	Gang Signs & Prayer
"First Things First"	2017	25	4	4	—	—	BPI: Silver	Gang Signs & Prayer
"Mr Skeng"	2017	29	5	5	—	—	BPI: Silver	Gang Signs & Prayer
"Velvet/Jenny Francis (Interlude)"	2017	48	8	9	—	—		Gang Signs & Prayer
"Return of the Rucksack"	2017	53	10	11	—	—		Gang Signs & Prayer
"100 Bags"	2017	58	15	14	—	—		Gang Signs & Prayer
"Blinded by Your Grace, Pt. 1"	2017	59	14	13	—	—		Gang Signs & Prayer
"Don't Cry for Me" (featuring Raleigh Ritchie)	2017	63	18	15	—	—		Gang Signs & Prayer
"21 Gun Salute (Interlude)" (featuring Wretch 32)	2017	65	19	16	—	—		Gang Signs & Prayer
"Lay Me Bare"	2017	68	20	18	—	—		Gang Signs & Prayer
"Crazy Titch"	2017	100	—	21	—	—		Gang Signs & Prayer
"Ask Flipz" (Krept and Konan featuring Stormzy)	2017	30	—	—	—	—	BPI: Silver	7 Days
"Big Michael"	2019	—	—	—	—	—	BPI: Silver	Heavy Is the Head
"Rainfall" (featuring Tiana Major9)	2019	—	—	—	—	—	BPI: Silver	Heavy Is the Head
"One Second" (featuring H.E.R.)	2019	—	—	—	—	—	BPI: Silver	Heavy Is the Head
"Pop Boy" (featuring Aitch)	2019	—	—	—	—	—	BPI: Silver	Heavy Is the Head
"Lessons"	2019	9	4	—	15	—	BPI: Gold	Heavy Is the Head
"Fire + Water"	2022	—	—	—	—	35		This Is What I Mean
"This Is What I Mean"	2022	32	11	—	67	4		This Is What I Mean
"Bad Blood"	2022	—	—	—	—	36		This Is What I Mean
"—" denotes a recording that did not chart or was not released in that territory.

== Guest appearances ==
Title	Year	Other artists	Album
"All Starz"	2010	Bully, Wholagun, Don D	Bully or Be Bullied
"8 Ways"	2012	G Child, Bar4Bar, Vex	Curriculum Vitae
"Old Enough"	2013	Dem Two, Cadet	This Is UK Rap Vol. 2
"No Comment"	2014	Avelino, Bonkaz	Iconic Ambition
"Hugs & Kisses"	2014	Professor Green, Fekky	Growing Up in Public
"Big Man" / "All You Gotta Do"	2014	Yungen	Project Black & Red
"Top of the World"	2014	Paigey Cakey	The Right Paige
"Don't Like It"	2014	Angel	Possession with Intent
"Grew Up In"	2014	Wiley, Solo 45	Snakes & Ladders
"Keep On"	2014	Charlie Sloth, Potter Payper, Tone	Charlie Sloth presents Hood Heat Vol. 1
"Look Like"	2014	Charlie Sloth, JMC, Jadakiss	Charlie Sloth presents Hood Heat Vol. 1
"Living Life"	2014	Timbo	Summer Time Passion 3
"Blessings"	2014	Harvey and Ashley Walters	—N/a
"Warning Light"	2015	Nick Brewer	Warning Light
"Badder Than a Mother"	2015	IV Rox	Imperfections
"No Title"	2015	TE dness, Big 6ix	April Showers 2
"This Time Round"	2015	TE dness	April Showers 2
"Picture Me Rollin'"	2015	Squeeks, Propaine	The White House
"Ghetto Superstars"	2015	DJ Big Ryde, Kyze	Just a Reminder
"Out In the Jungle"	2015	Squeeks, Sneakbo, Dubz, Mr Bigz	AR15: Concrete Jungle
"Gangsters with Dreams"	2015	Young Spray, Snap Capone, Corleone, C Biz, Kyze, Youngs Teflon, Stana, Avelino, Dubz, J Avalanche, Big 6ix, Beanz, Young Tribez, Skeng	AR15: Concrete Jungle
"Dead Body Part 2"	2015	Little Simz, Kano	—N/a
"Been the Man"	2015	Tinie Tempah, JME, Ms Banks	Junk Food
"And Dat"	2016	Bonkaz	Mixtape of the Year
"Keep It Simple"	2016	Raleigh Ritchie	You're a Man Now, Boy
"Lex Luther"	2016	Mez, DaVinChe	The M1 EP
"The Blow Back"	2016	Giggs, Dubz	Landlord
"Keepin' It Real"	2016	P Money	Live and Direct
"Shape of You" (Remix)	2017	Ed Sheeran	Non-album remix
"Timbuktu"	2018	Cassper Nyovest, Los Unidades, Jess Kent	Global Citizen - EP 1
"Keep Talking"	2019	Krept & Konan, Cadet	Revenge Is Sweet
"Real Life"	2020	Burna Boy	Twice as Tall
"How Do We Find Our Truth? / The Other Side"	2020	Future Utopia, Beatrice Mushiya	12 Questions
"Interlude"	2022	None	Black Panther: Wakanda Forever - Music From and Inspired By
"Pick Your Poison"	2022	Bree Runway	Woah, What a Blur!

== Remixes ==
Title	Year	Artist
"Move with You" (Remix featuring Stormzy and Wretch 32)	2014	Jacob Banks
"Nobody" (Remix featuring Stormzy, Squeeks and Youngs Teflon)	2014	Loick
"Ain't On Nuttin'" (Remix Part 2 featuring Sneakbo, Stormzy, Bashy, Angel, Benny Banks, Ghetts and Cashtastic)	2015	Yungen
"Sometimes" (Remix featuring Stormzy and Tinie Tempah)	2015	G FrSH
"The Greatest" (Star.One Remix featuring Tempa T, Stormzy and Ghetts)	2015	Raleigh Ritchie
"Chains" (Remix featuring Stormzy)	2015	Nick Jonas
"Fester Skank Remix" (Remix featuring Stormzy, Chip, Fuse ODG and Wretch 32)	2015	Lethal Bizzle and Diztortion
"Feed 'Em to the Lions" (Remix featuring Fekky, Stormzy, Tempa T, Wiley, Lethal Bizzle and Rou Reynolds)	2016	Solo 45
"Sore (Remix)" (Remix featuring Stormzy & Kwesi Arthur)	2021	Yaw Tog
