= Heavy Is the Head Tour =

2020–22 concert tour by Stormzy

- Tour by Stormzy
- Location: Africa; Asia; Europe; North America; Oceania
- Associated album: Heavy Is the Head
- Start date: 7 February 2020
- End date: 4 April 2022
- Legs: 2
- No. of shows: 29

Stormzy concert chronology
- Gang Signs & Prayers Tour (2017); Heavy Is the Head Tour (2020–2022)

The Heavy Is the Head Tour was the second concert tour by British rapper Stormzy, staged in support of his second studio album, Heavy Is the Head (2019). The tour began on 7 February 2020 at the RedfestDXB festival in Dubai, and was scheduled to conclude on 10 October of the same year in Lagos, Nigeria. The tour was officially announced in November 2019, with additional dates published on 6 December 2019. Due to the impact of the COVID-19 pandemic, the tour was suspended at the start of March 2020 and resumed with 15 dates in the UK and Ireland in March and April of 2022.

== Tour ==
The tour kicked off on 7 February 2020 at the RedfestDXB festival in Dubai, before heading to Europe as part of the tour's first leg. The onset of the COVID-19 pandemic caused numerous disruptions to the tour. On 13 February 2020 the Asian leg of the tour was postponed. Although the European dates were generally kept, the final concert of the European leg, scheduled for Zürich in Switzerland on 5 March, was cancelled after authorities limited gatherings to a maximum of 1,000 people. Stormzy performed in Prague on 4 March to a sold-out crowd at the Malá sportovní hala in Výstaviště Praha, but this proved to be his last public concert of 2020.

The Australia and New Zealand leg of the tour were later postponed for the same reason, firstly to November 2020, before being rescheduled for November and December 2022. In September 2022, the Australasian dates were cancelled outright.

The UK & Ireland leg of the tour was pushed back from its initial slot of September 2020, to April 2021, before being moved again to March 2022. The tour finally resumed with Stormzy's first UK arena date in Cardiff on 13 March 2022.

== Set list ==
The following set list was obtained from the concert held on 15 March 2022 at the Utilita Arena in Newcastle, England. It does not represent all concerts for the duration of the tour.

1. Intro
2. Big Michael
3. Audacity
4. Know Me From
5. Cold
6. Handsome
7. First Things First
8. Interlude - Heavy Is The Head
9. Crown
10. Superheroes
11. Own It
12. Do Better
13. Real Life (Burna Boy ft. Stormzy)
14. One Second
15. Cigarettes & Cush
16. Rachael's Little Brother
17. Lessons
18. Rainfall
19. Interlude - Don't Forget To Breathe
20. Wiley Flow
21. Clash (Dave ft. Stormzy)
22. Big for Your Boots
23. Shut Up
24. Blinded by Your Grace, Pt. 2
25. Vossi Bop

== Shows ==
List of Middle East and European concerts
Date (2020)	City	Country	Venue
7 February	Dubai	United Arab Emirates	RedfestDXB (Note: TBA at the time of the tour being announced.)
10 February	Brussels	Belgium	Ancienne Belgique
11 February	Brussels	Belgium	Ancienne Belgique
20 February	Berlin	Germany	Columbiahalle
21 February	Copenhagen	Denmark	Royal Arena
22 February	Amsterdam	Netherlands	AFAS Live
24 February	Hamburg	Germany	Docks
25 February	Oslo	Norway	Sentrum Scene
26 February	Stockholm	Sweden	Annexet
28 February	Cologne	Germany	Carlswerk Victoria
29 February	Paris	France	Le Trianon
1 March	Mainz	Germany	Altes Postlager
3 March	Warsaw	Poland	Stodoła
4 March	Prague	Czech Republic	Malá sportovní hala, Výstaviště Praha (Note: moved from Roxy, due to exceptional demand.)

=== Rearranged shows ===
List of UK and Ireland concerts
Original Date (2020)	Rearranged Date (2022)	City	Country	Venue
3 September	27 March	London	United Kingdom	The O2
4 September	28 March	London	United Kingdom	The O2
5 September	29 March	London	United Kingdom	The O2
7 September	1 April	Dublin	Ireland	3Arena
8 September	2 April	Dublin	Ireland	3Arena
10 September	3 April	Glasgow	United Kingdom	SSE Hydro
11 September	15 March	Newcastle upon Tyne	United Kingdom	Utilita Arena
12 September	16 March	Leeds	United Kingdom	First Direct Arena
13 September	20 March	Liverpool	United Kingdom	M&S Bank Arena
16 September	18 March	Sheffield	United Kingdom	FlyDSA Arena
17 September	19 March	Manchester	United Kingdom	Manchester Arena
18 September	21 March	Nottingham	United Kingdom	Motorpoint Arena
19 September	23 March	Birmingham	United Kingdom	Arena Birmingham
21 September	13 March	Cardiff	United Kingdom	Motorpoint Arena Cardiff
22 September	24 March	Bournemouth	United Kingdom	Bournemouth International Centre

=== Cancelled shows ===
List of European concerts
Date (2020)	City	Country	Venue
5 March	Zürich	Switzerland	X-TRA

List of Asian concerts
Date (2020)	City	Country	Venue
24 March	Akasaka	Japan	Blitz
27 March	Shanghai	China	Arkham
28 March	Hong Kong	Hong Kong	Sónar
29 March	Seoul	Korea	MUV Hall

List of Oceanian concerts
Date (2020)	City	Country	Venue
1 May	Wellington	New Zealand	TSB Bank Arena
2 May	Auckland	New Zealand	The Trusts Stadium
6 May	Perth	Australia	HBF Stadium
9 May	Sydney	Australia	Hordern Pavilion
10 May	Sydney	Australia	Hordern Pavilion
13 May	Adelaide	Australia	Adelaide Entertainment Centre
14 May	Melbourne	Australia	John Cain Arena
16 May	Brisbane	Australia	Riverstage

List of North American concerts
Date (2020)	City	Country	Venue
26 May	Oakland	United States	Fox Theater
27 May	Los Angeles	United States	The Novo
29 May	Denver	United States	Cervantes' Masterpiece Ballroom
30 May	Atlanta	United States	Buckhead Theatre
31 May	Montreal	Canada	Theatre Corona
2 June	Toronto	Canada	Rebel
4 June	Brooklyn	United States	Brooklyn Steel
5 June	Philadelphia	United States	Theatre of Living Arts
6 June	Washington, D.C.	United States	9:30 Club
9 June	Chicago	United States	Metro
12 June	Houston	United States	House of Blues
13 June	Dallas	United States	House of Blues

List of African concerts
Date (2020)	City	Country	Venue
3 October	Cape Town	South Africa	Rocking the Daisies Festival
4 October	Johannesburg	South Africa	In the City Festival
9 October	Accra	Ghana	Untamed Empire
10 October	Lagos	Nigeria	Balmoral Convention Center
