= List of UK top-ten singles in 2019 =

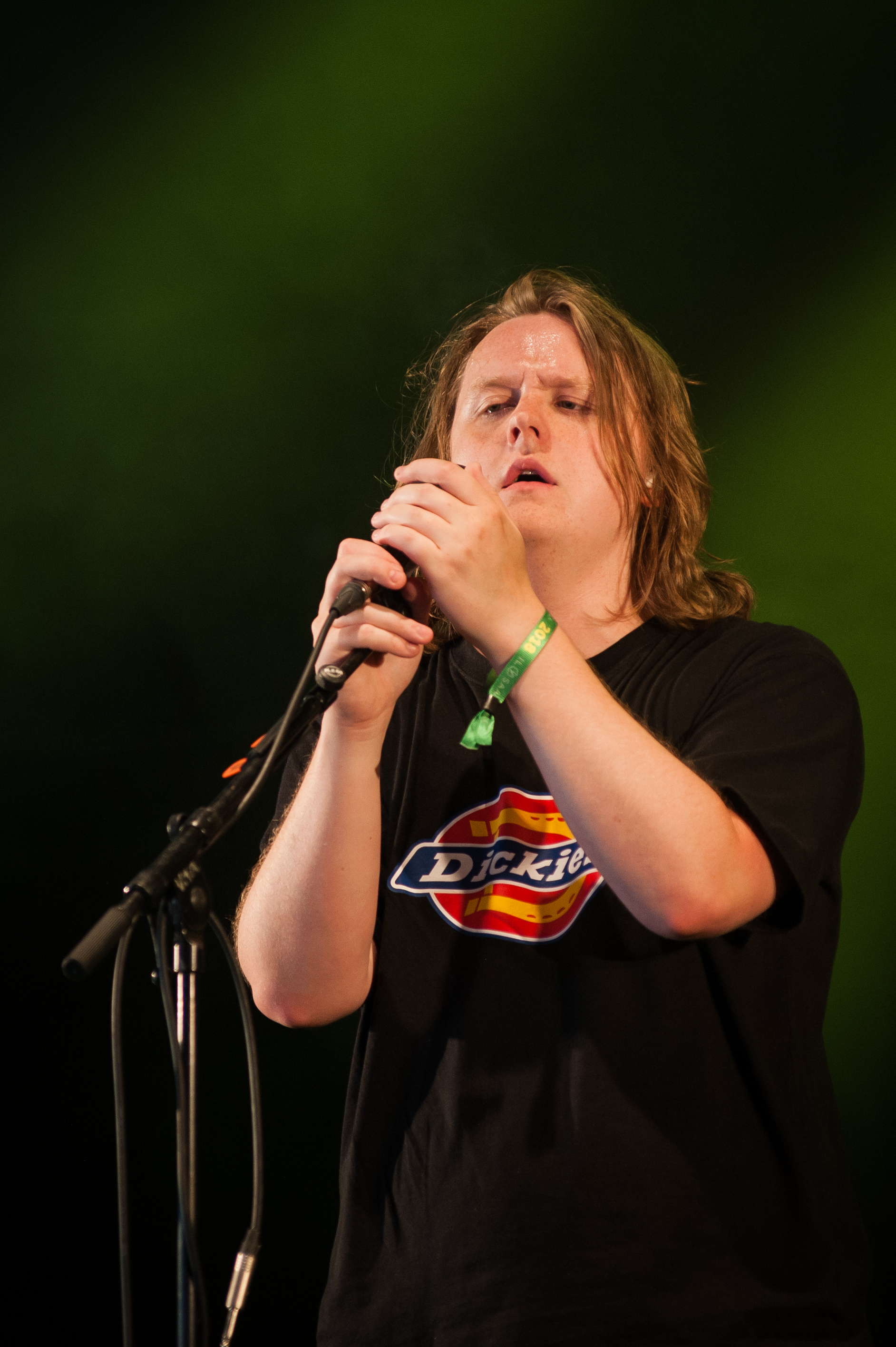
Scottish singer-songwriter Lewis Capaldi had the best-selling single of 2019 with "Someone You Loved", which spent seven weeks at number-one and had a total of 31 non-consecutive weeks in the top 10. Capaldi achieved four more top 10 singles this year, including "Before You Go", which would eventually peak at number-one on 6 February 2020.

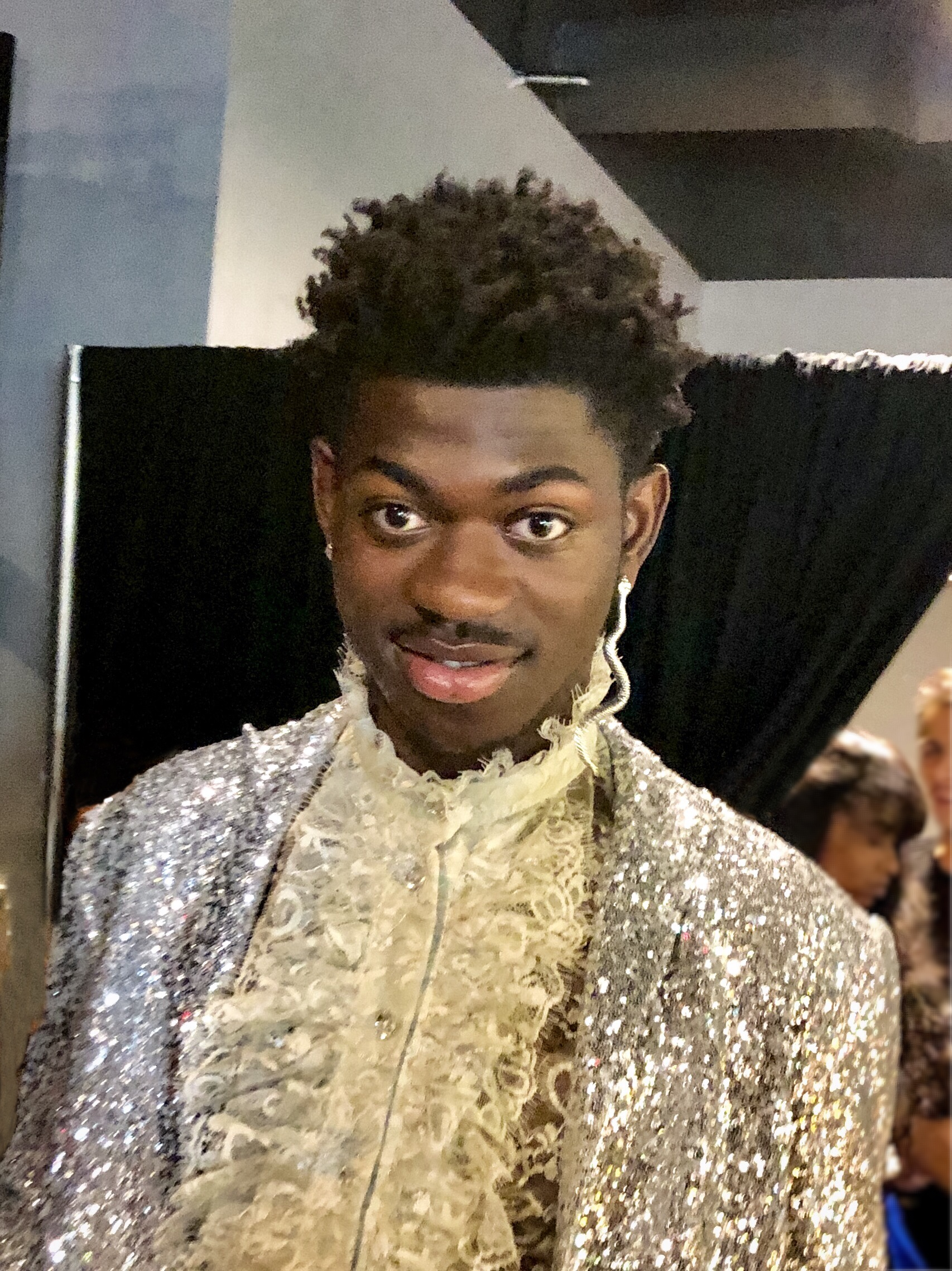
Lil Nas X spent 16 consecutive weeks in the UK top 10 with his hit single "Old Town Road, which peaked at number-one for two weeks. It went on to become the second best selling single of this year.

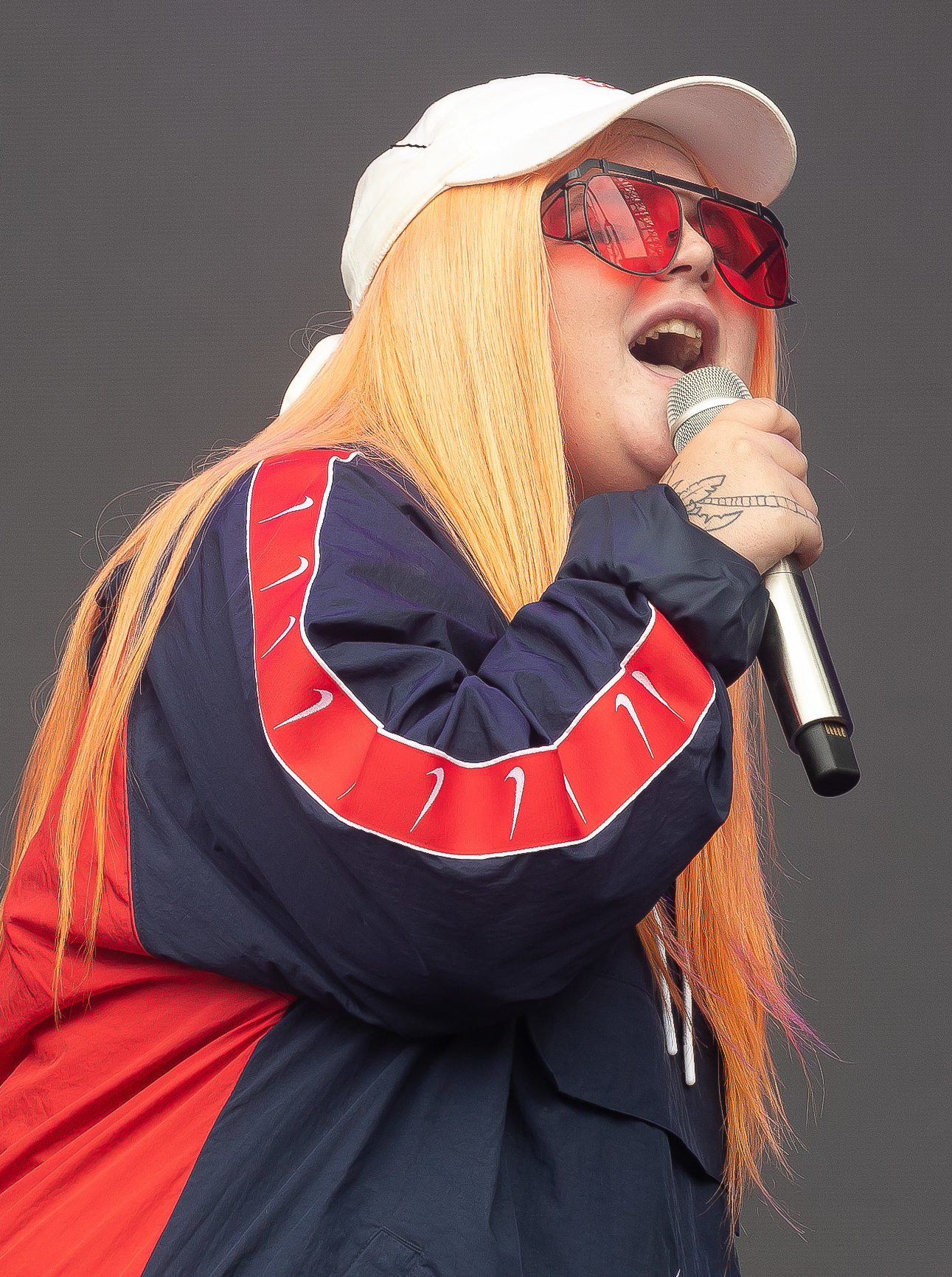
Australian singer and songwriter Tones and I spent eleven consecutive weeks at number-one in the UK Singles Chart with her song "Dance Monkey", which not only became the longest-running chart-topper of 2019, but also broke the record for the most weeks spent at the top of the UK charts by a female artist.

The UK Singles Chart is one of many music charts compiled by the Official Charts Company that calculates the best-selling singles of the week in the United Kingdom. Since 2004 the chart has been based on the sales of both physical singles and digital downloads, with airplay figures excluded from the official chart. Since 2014, the singles chart has been based on both sales and streaming, with the ratio altered in 2017 to 150:1 streams and only three singles by the same artist eligible for the chart. From July 2018, video streams from YouTube Music and Spotify among others began to be counted for the Official Charts. This list shows singles that peaked in the Top 10 of the UK Singles Chart during 2019, as well as singles which peaked in 2018 and 2020 but were in the top 10 in 2019. The entry date is when the song appeared in the top 10 for the first time (week ending, as published by the Official Charts Company, which is six days after the chart is announced).

One-hundred and six singles were in the top ten this year. Twelve singles from 2018 remained in the top 10 for several weeks at the beginning of the year, while "Before You Go" by Lewis Capaldi, "Own It" by Stormzy featuring Ed Sheeran and Burna Boy, "River" by Ellie Goulding and "Roxanne" by Arizona Zervas were all released in 2019 but did not reach their peak until 2020. "All I Want for Christmas is You" by Mariah Carey, "Fairytale of New York" by The Pogues featuring Kirsty MacColl, "Last Christmas" by Wham!, "Nothing Breaks Like a Heart" by Mark Ronson featuring Miley Cyrus, "Rewrite the Stars" by James Arthur featuring Anne-Marie, "Sunflower" by Post Malone featuring Swae Lee and "Sweet but Psycho" by Ava Max were the singles from 2018 to reach their peak in 2019. Twenty-two artists scored multiple entries in the top ten in 2019. AJ Tracey, Billie Eilish, Lewis Capaldi and Troye Sivan were among the many artists who achieved their first top 10 single in 2019.

The first number-one single of the year was "Sweet but Psycho" by Ava Max. Overall, eleven different singles peaked at number-one in 2019, with Ed Sheeran (3) having the most singles hit that position. An asterisk (*) in the "Weeks in Top 10" column shows that the song is currently in the top 10.

== Background ==
=== Non-mover top 12 ===
The top 12 singles on the chart on 13 June 2019 (week ending), all remained at their positions from the previous week. The singles included "I Don't Care" by Ed Sheeran and Justin Bieber at 1, "Old Town Road" by Lil Nas X at 2, "Someone You Loved" by Lewis Capaldi at 3, "Vossi Bop" by Stormzy at 4, "Bad Guy" by Billie Eilish at 5, "Piece of Your Heart" by Meduza featuring Goodboys at 6, "Hold Me While You Wait" by Lewis Capaldi at 7, "SOS" by Avicii featuring Aloe Blacc at 8, "Cross Me" by Ed Sheeran featuring Chance the Rapper and PnB Rock at 9, "If I Can't Have You" by Shawn Mendes at 10, "All Day and Night" by Jax Jones, Martin Solveig and Madison Beer at 11 and "Location" by Dave featuring Burna Boy at 12.

=== LadBaby back-to-back Christmas number-ones ===
YouTube vlogger LadBaby (real name Mark Hoyle) and his wife Roxy created a slice of chart history as they achieved a second successive Christmas number-one with their parody of "I Love Rock 'n' Roll", re-titled "I Love Sausage Rolls". They had first topped the chart in 2018 with another parody single based on "We Built This City", raising money for the food charity Trussell Trust. They became only the second act after Spice Girls to score back-to-back Christmas chart toppers, and it was also the first time in history where two novelty singles reached Christmas number-one in successive years.

On the flipside, the sales dropped off in its second week and the single fell to number 57, meaning they also joined Elvis Presley as only the second act to see two number-one singles fall out of the top 10 straight from the top spot. His reissued singles "One Night"/"I Got Stung" and "It's Now or Never" from 2005 both dropped out of the top 10 the week after topping the chart. "We Built This City" had slipped from number-one to number 21 in the space of a week at the end of 2018.

=== Chart debuts ===
Forty-two artists achieved their first charting top 10 single in 2019. Four acts have had a second single reach the top 10: Russ, Tion Wayne, AJ Tracey, and Headie One. Aitch, Billie Eilish, and Burna Boy achieved two more chart hits in 2019. Lewis Capaldi had five more entries in his breakthrough year.

The following table (collapsed on desktop site) does not include acts who had previously charted as part of a group and secured their first top 10 solo single.

Artist	Number of top 10s	First entry	Chart position	Other entries
Lewis Capaldi	5	"Someone You Loved"	1	"Hold Me While You Wait" (4), "Grace" (9), "Bruises" (6), "Before You Go" (1)
Aitch	3	"Taste (Make It Shake)"	2	"Strike a Pose" (9), "Buss Down" (8)
Billie Eilish	3	"Bury a Friend"	6	"Bad Guy" (2), "Everything I Wanted" (3)
Russ	2	"Gun Lean"	9	"Keisha & Becky" (7)
Tion Wayne	2	"Options"	7	"Keisha & Becky" (7)
Burna Boy	3	"Location"	6	"Be Honest" (8), "Own It" (1)
AJ Tracey	2	"Fashion Week"	7	"Ladbroke Grove" (3)
Headie One	2	"18Hunna"	6	"Audacity" (6)
Pinkfong	1	"Baby Shark"	6	—
Gesaffelstein	1	"Lost in the Fire"	9	—
J. Cole	1	"Middle Child"	9	—
NSG	1	"Options"	7	—
Jonas Brothers	1	"Sucker"	4	—
Lauv	1	"I'm So Tired"	8	—
Troye Sivan	1	"I'm So Tired"	8	—
Steel Banglez	1	"Fashion Week"	7	—
MoStack	1	"Fashion Week"	7	—
Meduza	1	"Piece of Your Heart"	2	—
Goodboys	1	"Piece of Your Heart"	2	—
Lil Nas X	1	"Old Town Road"	1	—
Chvrches	1	"Here With Me"	9	—
Brendon Urie	1	"Me!"	3	—
Madison Beer	1	"All Day and Night"	10	—
PnB Rock	1	"Cross Me"	4	—
Mist	1	"So High"	7	—
Dominic Fike	1	"3 Nights"	3	—
Social House	1	"Boyfriend"	4	—
Lil Tecca	1	"Ransom"	7	—
Joel Corry	1	"Sorry"	6	—
Young T & Bugsey	1	"Strike a Pose"	9	—
Regard	1	"Ride It"	2	—
Tones and I	1	"Dance Monkey"	1	—
Dermot Kennedy	1	"Outnumbered"	6	—
Jorja Smith	1	"Be Honest"	8	—
Rani	1	"Post Malone"	10	—
ZieZie	1	"Buss Down"	8	—
Lizzo	1	"Good as Hell"	7	—
Arizona Zervas	1	"Roxanne"	4	—
KSI	1	"Down Like That"	10	—
Lil Baby	1	"Down Like That"	10	—
Rick Ross	1	"Down Like That"	10	—
S-X	1	"Down Like That"	10	—

Notes

Normani Kordei made her solo top 10 chart debut with "Dancing with a Stranger" by Sam Smith after following two top 10 hits with Fifth Harmony. Brendon Urie, the lead singer of Panic! At the Disco, had never previously achieved a top 10 single in over a decade career with his group, the closest to this milestone "High Hopes", peaked at number twelve in 2018. However, he made his solo top 10 debut by featuring on "Me!".

=== Songs from films ===
Original songs from various films entered the top 10 throughout the year. These included "Sunflower" (from Spider-Man: Into the Spider-verse) and "Don't Call Me Angel" (Charlie's Angels).

Additionally, "Rewrite the Stars" by James Arthur and Anne-Marie also entered the top 10 at number 8, however despite being from The Greatest Showman, this entry was part of The Greatest Showman: Reimagined soundtrack. The original version was sung by Zac Efron and Zendaya in the film.

=== Best-selling singles ===
Lewis Capaldi had the best-selling single of the year with "Someone You Loved". The song spent 21 weeks in the top 10 (including seven weeks at number-one), sold over 1,800,000 copies and was certified 3× platinum by the BPI. "Old Town Road" by Lil Nas X came in second place, while Ed Sheeran and Justin Bieber's "I Don't Care", "Bad Guy" by Billie Eilish and "Giant" from Calvin Harris & Rag'n'Bone Man made up the top five. Singles by Ava Max, Stormzy, Tones & I, Mabel and Shawn Mendes and Camila Cabello were also in the top ten best-selling singles of the year.

== Top-ten singles ==
Key

Symbol	Meaning
‡	Single peaked in 2018 but still in chart in 2019.
♦	Single released in 2019 but peaked in 2020.
(#)	Year-end top-ten single position and rank
Entered	The date that the single first appeared in the chart.
Peak	Highest position that the single reached in the UK Singles Chart.

Entered (week ending)	Weeks in top 10	Single	Artist	Peak	Peak reached (week ending)	Weeks at peak
Singles in 2018
14 June 2018	16	"Shotgun" ‡ ^{[A]}	George Ezra	1	5 July 2018	4
11 October 2018	7	"Lost Without You" ‡ ^{[B]}	Freya Ridings	9	11 October 2018	5
1 November 2018	13	"Sunflower" ^{[C]}	Post Malone & Swae Lee	3	10 January 2019	1
1 November 2018	7	"Zeze" ‡ ^{[D]}	Kodak Black featuring Travis Scott & Offset	7	8 November 2018	1
15 November 2018	12	"Thank U, Next" ‡	Ariana Grande	1	15 November 2018	6
15 November 2018	9	"Without Me" ‡ ^{[E]}	Halsey	3	13 December 2018	2
6 December 2018	12	"Sweet but Psycho" (#6) ^{[F]}	Ava Max	1	3 January 2019	4
13 December 2018	8	"All I Want for Christmas Is You" ^{[G]}^{[TT]}	Mariah Carey	2	3 January 2019	2
13 December 2018	3	"Rewrite the Stars" ^{[H]}	James Arthur & Anne-Marie	7	17 January 2019	1
13 December 2018	10	"Nothing Breaks Like a Heart" ^{[I]}	Mark Ronson featuring Miley Cyrus	2	24 January 2019	1
20 December 2018	6	"Last Christmas" ^{[J]}^{[UU]}	Wham!	3	3 January 2019	2
20 December 2018	3	"Fairytale of New York" ^{[K]}	The Pogues featuring Kirsty MacColl	4	3 January 2019	2
Singles in 2019
3 January 2019	1	"Do They Know It's Christmas?" ^{[L]}^{[M]}	Band Aid	6	3 January 2019	1
3 January 2019	1	"It's Beginning to Look a Lot Like Christmas"	Michael Bublé	7	3 January 2019	1
3 January 2019	1	"One More Sleep" ^{[N]}	Leona Lewis	8	3 January 2019	1
3 January 2019	1	"Merry Christmas Everyone" ^{[O]}	Shakin' Stevens	9	3 January 2019	1
3 January 2019	1	"Step into Christmas" ^{[P]}	Elton John	10	3 January 2019	1
10 January 2019	8	"Wow"	Post Malone	3	24 January 2019	1
10 January 2019	1	"Baby Shark"	Pinkfong	6	10 January 2019	1
10 January 2019	1	"Ruin My Life"	Zara Larsson	9	10 January 2019	1
17 January 2019	1	"18Hunna"	Headie One featuring Dave	6	17 January 2019	1
17 January 2019	1	"Hold My Girl"	George Ezra	8	17 January 2019	1
24 January 2019	9	"Dancing with a Stranger"	Sam Smith & Normani	3	31 January 2019	3
24 January 2019	14	"Giant" (#5)	Calvin Harris & Rag'n'Bone Man	2	7 March 2019	5
24 January 2019	2	"Play"	Jax Jones & Years & Years	8	24 January 2019	1
24 January 2019	1	"Lost in the Fire"	Gesaffelstein & The Weeknd	9	24 January 2019	1
31 January 2019	9	"7 Rings"	Ariana Grande	1	31 January 2019	4
31 January 2019	1	"Gun Lean"	Russ	9	31 January 2019	1
7 February 2019	8	"Don't Call Me Up" (#9)	Mabel	3	14 March 2019	3
7 February 2019	1	"Middle Child"	J. Cole	9	7 February 2019	1
7 February 2019	31	"Someone You Loved" (#1) ^{[Q]}^{[BBB]}	Lewis Capaldi	1	7 March 2019	7
14 February 2019	6	"Bury a Friend" ^{[R]}	Billie Eilish	6	11 April 2019	1
21 February 2019	8	"Break Up with Your Girlfriend, I'm Bored"	Ariana Grande	1	21 February 2019	1
21 February 2019	1	"Needy"	Ariana Grande	8	21 February 2019	1
28 February 2019	4	"Options"	NSG featuring Tion Wayne	7	7 March 2019	1
7 March 2019	3	"Walk Me Home"	Pink	8	7 March 2019	1
7 March 2019	11	"Just You and I"	Tom Walker	3	4 April 2019	1
14 March 2019	8	"Sucker"	Jonas Brothers	4	4 April 2019	1
21 March 2019	2	"Disaster"	Dave featuring J Hus	8	21 March 2019	1
21 March 2019	1	"Streatham"	Dave	9	21 March 2019	1
28 March 2019	6	"Location" ^{[S]}	Dave featuring Burna Boy	6	4 April 2019	1
28 March 2019	2	"I'm So Tired..."	Lauv & Troye Sivan	8	4 April 2019	1
4 April 2019	2	"Fashion Week"	Steel Banglez featuring AJ Tracey & MoStack	7	4 April 2019	1
11 April 2019	15	"Bad Guy" (#4) ^{[T]}	Billie Eilish	2	11 April 2019	1
11 April 2019	10	"Piece of Your Heart"	Meduza featuring Goodboys	2	2 May 2019	1
18 April 2019	16	"Old Town Road" (#2)	Lil Nas X	1	25 April 2019	2
18 April 2019	2	"Talk" ^{[U]}	Khalid	9	18 April 2019	1
25 April 2019	3	"Keisha & Becky"	Russ & Tion Wayne	7	25 April 2019	1
25 April 2019	2	"Here with Me"	Marshmello featuring Chvrches	9	2 May 2019	1
2 May 2019	10	"SOS"	Avicii featuring Aloe Blacc	6	2 May 2019	1
9 May 2019	9	"Vossi Bop" (#7)	Stormzy	1	9 May 2019	2
9 May 2019	3	"Me!"	Taylor Swift featuring Brendon Urie	3	9 May 2019	1
16 May 2019	15	"Hold Me While You Wait"	Lewis Capaldi	4	16 May 2019	3
16 May 2019	4	"If I Can't Have You"	Shawn Mendes	9	16 May 2019	1
23 May 2019	12	"I Don't Care" (#3) ^{[V]}	Ed Sheeran & Justin Bieber	1	23 May 2019	8
30 May 2019	1	"Grace"	Lewis Capaldi	9	30 May 2019	1
30 May 2019	2	"All Day and Night" ^{[W]}	Europa & Madison Beer	10	30 May 2019	2
6 June 2019	10	"Cross Me"	Ed Sheeran featuring Chance the Rapper & PnB Rock	4	4 July 2019	3
20 June 2019	3	"No Guidance"	Chris Brown featuring Drake	6	27 June 2019	1
27 June 2019	2	"You Need to Calm Down"	Taylor Swift	5	27 June 2019	1
27 June 2019	1	"Bounce Back"	Little Mix	10	27 June 2019	1
4 July 2019	9	"Señorita" (#10)	Shawn Mendes & Camila Cabello	1	18 July 2019	6
4 July 2019	4	"Crown"	Stormzy	4	11 July 2019	1
11 July 2019	9	"Beautiful People"	Ed Sheeran featuring Khalid	1	25 July 2019	1
11 July 2019	2	"Mad Love"	Mabel	8	11 July 2019	1
11 July 2019	4	"Wish You Well"	Sigala & Becky Hill	8	25 July 2019	1
18 July 2019	2	"Goodbyes" ^{[II]}	Post Malone featuring Young Thug	5	18 July 2019	1
25 July 2019	7	"Take Me Back to London" ^{[X]}^{[HH]}	Ed Sheeran featuring Stormzy	1	5 September 2019	5
25 July 2019	13	"Ladbroke Grove"	AJ Tracey	3	10 October 2019	1
25 July 2019	7	"So High" ^{[Y]}	Mist featuring Fredo	7	25 July 2019	1
8 August 2019	11	"3 Nights"	Dominic Fike	3	22 August 2019	2
8 August 2019	11	"Higher Love"	Kygo & Whitney Houston	2	5 September 2019	2
15 August 2019	1	"Boyfriend"	Ariana Grande & Social House	4	15 August 2019	1
15 August 2019	9	"Taste (Make It Shake)"	Aitch	2	19 September 2019	2
22 August 2019	4	"How Do You Sleep?"	Sam Smith	7	22 August 2019	1
29 August 2019	6	"Ransom" ^{[LL]}	Lil Tecca	7	29 August 2019	2
29 August 2019	8	"Sorry"	Joel Corry	6	12 September 2019	4
12 September 2019	6	"Strike a Pose"	Young T & Bugsey featuring Aitch	9	19 September 2019	2
19 September 2019	10	"Circles"	Post Malone	3	31 October 2019	1
26 September 2019	1	"Don't Call Me Angel"	Ariana Grande, Miley Cyrus & Lana Del Rey	2	26 September 2019	1
3 October 2019	9	"Ride It"	Regard	2	10 October 2019	4
3 October 2019	16	"Dance Monkey" (#8) ^{[WW]}	Tones and I	1	10 October 2019	11
17 October 2019	3	"Highest in the Room"	Travis Scott	2	17 October 2019	1
17 October 2019	5	"Outnumbered"	Dermot Kennedy	6	24 October 2019	1
24 October 2019	1	"Lights Up"	Harry Styles	3	24 October 2019	1
24 October 2019	8	"South of the Border"	Ed Sheeran featuring Camila Cabello & Cardi B	4	31 October 2019	3
24 October 2019	2	"Be Honest"	Jorja Smith featuring Burna Boy	8	24 October 2019	1
24 October 2019	7	"Bruises"	Lewis Capaldi	6	31 October 2019	3
24 October 2019	1	"Post Malone"	Sam Feldt featuring Rani	10	24 October 2019	1
31 October 2019	1	"Buss Down"	Aitch featuring ZieZie	8	31 October 2019	1
31 October 2019	8	"Memories"	Maroon 5	5	28 November 2019	1
7 November 2019	5	"Lose You to Love Me" ^{[XX]}	Selena Gomez	3	7 November 2019	1
7 November 2019	1	"Follow God"	Kanye West	6	7 November 2019	1
7 November 2019	4	"Good as Hell" ^{[RR]}	Lizzo	7	7 November 2019	2
14 November 2019	25	"Don't Start Now" ^{[YY]}	Dua Lipa	2	14 November 2019	3
21 November 2019	1	"Must Be"	J Hus	5	21 November 2019	1
28 November 2019	10	"Everything I Wanted" ^{[ZZ]}^{[DDD]}	Billie Eilish	3	28 November 2019	1
28 November 2019	11	"Roxanne" ♦ ^{[AAA]}	Arizona Zervas	4	9 January 2020	2
5 December 2019	12	"Before You Go" ♦ ^{[BBB]}	Lewis Capaldi	1	6 February 2020	1
5 December 2019	10	"Own It" ♦	Stormzy featuring Ed Sheeran & Burna Boy	1	9 January 2020	3
5 December 2019	1	"Down Like That"	KSI featuring Rick Ross, Lil Baby & S-X	10	5 December 2019	1
12 December 2019	1	"Heartless"	The Weeknd	10	12 December 2019	1
19 December 2019	2	"River" ♦ ^{[VV]}	Ellie Goulding	1	2 January 2020	1
26 December 2019	1	"I Love Sausage Rolls"	LadBaby	1	26 December 2019	1
26 December 2019	1	"Audacity"	Stormzy featuring Headie One	6	26 December 2019	1
26 December 2019	1	"Lessons"	Stormzy	9	26 December 2019	1

== Entries by artist ==
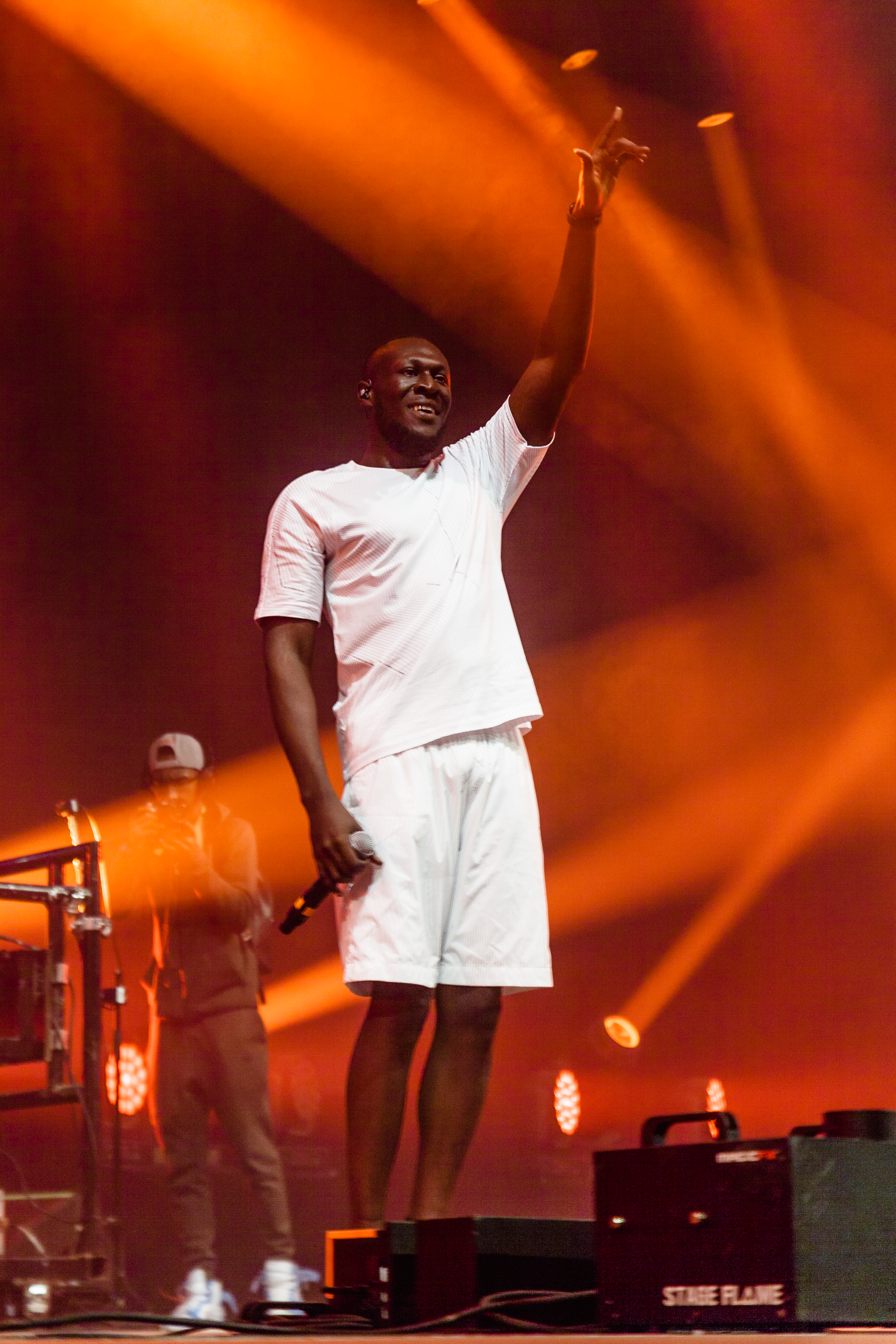
Stormzy scored six top 10 entries this year. "Vossi Bop" debuted at number-one in May and became his first single to top the UK chart. He also reached the top spot thanks to his appearance on Ed Sheeran's "Take Me Back to London". "Own It", which also featured Sheeran as well as Nigerian singer Burna Boy, would reach its peak of number-one on 9 January 2020.

The following table shows artists who have achieved two or more top 10 entries in 2019, including singles that reached their peak in 2018. The figures include both main artists and featured artists, while appearances on ensemble charity records are also counted for each artist. The total number of weeks an artist spent in the top ten in 2019 is also shown.

Entries	Artist	Weeks	Singles
6	Ariana Grande ^{[AAA]}	17	"Thank U, Next", "7 Rings", "Break Up with Your Girlfriend, I'm Bored", "Needy", "Boyfriend", "Don't Call Me Angel"
6	Ed Sheeran ^{[SS]}	33	"I Don't Care", "Cross Me", "Beautiful People", "Take Me Back to London", "South of the Border", “Own It”
6	Stormzy ^{[BB]}	23	"Vossi Bop", "Crown", "Take Me Back to London", "Own It", "Audacity", "Lessons"
5	Lewis Capaldi	39	"Grace", "Someone You Loved", "Hold Me While You Wait", "Bruises", "Before You Go"
4	Post Malone ^{[CC]}	22	"Sunflower", "Wow", "Goodbyes", "Circles"
4	Dave ^{[AA]}	7	"18Hunna", "Streatham", "Disaster", "Location"
3	Billie Eilish	34	"Bury a Friend", "Bad Guy", "Everything I Wanted"
3	Burna Boy ^{[OO]}^{[PP]}^{[SS]}	13	"Location", "Be Honest", "Own It"
3	Aitch ^{[NN]}	11	"Strike a Pose", "Taste (Make It Shake)", "Buss Down"
2	Taylor Swift	5	"Me!", "You Need to Calm Down"
2	Khalid ^{[DD]}	11	"Talk", "Beautiful People"
2	Miley Cyrus ^{[JJ]}^{[KK]}	8	"Nothing Breaks Like a Heart", "Don't Call Me Angel"
2	George Ezra ^{[AAA]}	2	"Shotgun", "Hold My Girl"
2	George Michael ^{[EE]}^{[FF]}	4	"Last Christmas", "Do They Know It's Christmas?"
2	Russ	3	"Gun Lean", "Keisha & Becky"
2	Tion Wayne ^{[GG]}	3	"Options", "Keisha & Becky"
2	Jax Jones ^{[QQ]}	4	"Play", "All Day and Night"
2	Mabel	10	"Don't Call Me Up", "Mad Love"
2	AJ Tracey	15	"Fashion Week", "Ladbroke Grove"
2	Sam Smith	13	"Dancing with a Stranger", "How Do You Sleep?"
2	Headie One	2	"18Hunna", "Audacity"
2	Shawn Mendes	13	"If I Can't Have You", "Señorita"
2	The Weeknd	2	"Lost in the Fire", "Heartless"
2	Camila Cabello ^{[MM]}	17	"Señorita", "South of the Border"

== Notes ==
- ^{a} "Shotgun" re-entered the top 10 at number 7 on 10 January 2019 (week ending).
- ^{b} "Lost Without You" re-entered the top 10 at number 9 on 17 January 2019 (week ending).
- ^{c} "Sunflower" re-entered the top 10 at number 3 on 10 January 2019 (week ending).
- ^{d} "Zeze" re-entered the top 10 at number 10 on 10 January 2019 (week ending).
- ^{e} "Without Me" re-entered the top 10 at number 10 on 17 January 2019 (week ending).
- ^{f} "Sweet but Psycho" re-entered the top 10 at number 10 on 28 February 2019 (week ending).
- ^{g} "All I Want for Christmas" re-entered the top 10 on 13 December 2018 (week ending), having originally peaked at number 2 upon release in 1994.
- ^{h} "Rewrite the Stars" re-entered the top 10 at number 8 on 10 January 2019 (week ending).
- ^{i} "Nothing Breaks Like a Heart" re-entered the top 10 at number 4 on 10 January 2019 (week ending).
- ^{j} "Last Christmas" re-entered the top 10 on 20 December 2018 (week ending), having originally peaked at number 2 upon release in 1984.
- ^{k} "Fairytale of New York" re-entered the top 10 at number 10 on 20 December 2018 (week ending), having originally peaked at number 2 upon release in 1987. It re-entered the top 10 again at number 4 on 3 January 2019 (week ending).
- ^{l} Released as a charity single by Band Aid in 1984 to aid famine relief in Ethiopia.
- ^{m} "Do They Know It's Christmas?" re-entered the top 10 on 3 January 2019 (week ending), having originally peaked at number 1 upon release in 1984.
- ^{n} "One More Sleep" re-entered the top 10 on 3 January 2019 (week ending), having originally peaked at number 3 upon release in 2013.
- ^{o} "Merry Christmas Everyone" re-entered the top 10 on 3 January 2019 (week ending), having originally peaked at number 1 upon release in 1985.
- ^{p} "Step into Christmas" originally peaked at number 24 on its initial release in 1973. It reached the top 20 for the first time in 2017, peaking at number 11.
- ^{q} "Someone You Loved" re-entered the top 10 at number 10 on 11 June 2019 (week ending).
- ^{r} "Bury a Friend" re-entered the top 10 at number 6 on 11 April 2019 (week ending) following the release of the album When We All Fall Asleep, Where Do We Go?.
- ^{s} "Location" re-entered the top 10 at number 10 on 9 May 2019 (week ending).
- ^{t} "Bad Guy" re-entered the top 10 at number 5 on 1 August 2019 (week ending), following the subsequent release of the remix featuring Justin Bieber.
- ^{u} "Talk" re-entered the top 10 at number 10 on 2 May 2019 (week ending).
- ^{v} "I Don't Care" re-entered the top 10 at number 3 on 1 August 2019 (week ending).
- ^{w} "All Day and Night" re-entered the top 10 at number 10 on 20 June 2019 (week ending).
- ^{x} "Take Me Back to London" re-entered the top 10 at number 10 on 22 August 2019 (week ending).
- ^{y} "So High" re-entered the top 10 at number 8 on 22 August 2019 (week ending).
- ^{z} Figure includes single that peaked in 2018.
- ^{aa} Figure includes appearance on Headie One's "18 Hunna".
- ^{bb} Figure includes appearance on Ed Sheeran's "Take Me Back to London".
- ^{cc} Figure includes single that first charted in 2018 but peaked in 2019.
- ^{dd} Figure includes appearance on Ed Sheeran's "Beautiful People".
- ^{ee} Figure includes a top-ten hit with the group Wham!.
- ^{ff} Figure includes an appearance on the "Do They Know It's Christmas?" charity single by Band Aid.
- ^{gg} Figure includes appearance on Tion Wayne's "Options".
- ^{hh} "Take Me Back to London" re-entered the top 10 at number 1 on 5 September following the subsequent remix featuring Aitch and JayKae.
- ^{ii} "Goodbyes" re-entered the top 10 at number 10 on 19 September following the release of the album Hollywood's Bleeding.
- ^{jj} Figure includes appearance on "Nothing Breaks Like a Heart".
- ^{kk} Figure includes appearance on "Don't Call Me Angel".
- ^{ll} "Ransom" re-entered the top 10 at number 10 on 10 October 2019 (week ending).
- ^{mm} Figure includes appearance on "South of the Border".
- ^{nn} Figure includes appearance on "Strike a Pose".
- ^{oo} Figure includes appearance on "Location".
- ^{pp} Figure includes appearance on "Be Honest".
- ^{qq} Figure includes appearance on "All Day and Night".
- ^{rr} "Good as Hell" entered the top 10 at number 7 on 7 November 2019 (week ending), following the subsequent release of the remix featuring Ariana Grande.
- ^{ss} Figure includes appearance on "Own It".
- ^{tt} "All I Want For Christmas" re-entered the top 10 at number 8 on 12 December 2019 (week ending).
- ^{uu} "Last Christmas" re-entered the top 10 at number 7 on 19 December 2019 (week ending).
- ^{vv} "River" re-entered the top 10 at number 1 on 2 January 2020 (week ending).
- ^{ww} "Dance Monkey" re-entered the top 10 at number 5 on 9 January 2020 (week ending).
- ^{xx} "Lose You to Love Me" re-entered the top 10 at number 10 on 9 January 2020 (week ending).
- ^{yy} "Don't Start Now" re-entered the top 10 at number 3 on 9 January 2020 (week ending).
- ^{zz} "Everything I Wanted" re-entered the top 10 at number 6 on 9 January 2020 (week ending).
- ^{aaa} "Roxanne" re-entered the top 10 at number 4 on 9 January 2020 (week ending).
- ^{bbb} "Before You Go" re-entered the top 10 at number 2 on 9 January 2020 (week ending).
- ^{ccc} "Someone You Loved" re-entered the top 10 at number 7 on 16 January 2020 (week ending).
- ^{ddd} "Everything I Wanted" re-entered the top 10 at number 8 on 6 February 2020 (week ending).

== See also ==
- 2019 in British music
- List of number-one singles from the 2010s (UK)
