= Brit Awards 2020 =

British music awards ceremony

- Date: 18 February 2020
- Venue: The O2 Arena
- Hosted by: Jack Whitehall; Alice Levine (Nominations show & red carpet); Clara Amfo (Red carpet)

Highlights
- Most awards: Lewis Capaldi (2)
- Most nominations: Lewis Capaldi; Dave (4 each)

Television/radio coverage
- Network: ITV; ITV2 (Red Carpet); YouTube
- Runtime: 125 minutes
- Viewership: 3.8 million

Brit Awards 2020 was the 40th edition of the British Phonographic Industry's annual pop music show, the Brit Awards, and was marketed as "The 40th Show". It was held on 18 February 2020 at the O2 Arena in London, with Jack Whitehall as the host for the third year running.

BBC Radio 1 host Alice Levine hosted the BRITs Are Coming Nominations Launch Show on 11 January 2020. The show was broadcast on ITV.

== Category changes ==
Several changes were made to the award categories compared to the previous year with the overall number of awards based on nominations reduced from thirteen to nine. None of the categories included fan voting.

=== Categories not included ===
Compared to 2019, the following awards were not awarded:

- International Group Award (Returned in 2021)
- Best British Video Award
- Outstanding Contribution to Music Award
- Global Success Award

=== Renamed categories ===
The following awards were renamed:

- Best New Artist (previously British Breakthrough Act)
- Rising Star Award (previously Critics' Choice Award)
- Song of the Year (previously British Single of the Year)

== Controversy ==
Following the launch show, the Brits were castigated for having male-dominated nominations on the main and gender-neutral categories. The nominations for Album of the Year, Best Group and Best New Artist were almost entirely dominated by male solo artists, except for Mabel who was nominated for the latter, and international singers Normani and Miley Cyrus, who both were up for Song of the Year for their collaborations with Sam Smith and Mark Ronson.

== Performers ==
=== Pre-ceremony ===
Performer(s)	Song	UK Singles Chart reaction (week ending 23 January 2020)	UK Albums Chart reaction (week ending 23 January 2020)
Liam Payne; Cheat Codes	"Live Forever"	N/A	LP1 – 100 (–31)
Freya Ridings	"Lost Without You"	N/A	Freya Ridings – 72 (+18)
Aitch	"Taste (Make It Shake)"	N/A	N/A
Dermot Kennedy	"Power Over Me"	60 (+26)	Without Fear – 23 (+17)
Mabel	"Don't Call Me Up"	52 (+4)	High Expectations – 22 (+7)

=== Main show ===
Performer(s)	Song	UK Singles Chart reaction (week ending 27 February 2020)	UK Albums Chart reaction (week ending 27 February 2020)
Mabel	"Don't Call Me Up"	34 (+14)	High Expectations – 24 (+5)
Lewis Capaldi	"Someone You Loved"	6 (+1)	Divinely Uninspired to a Hellish Extent – 2 (+/–)
Harry Styles	"Falling"	41 (+53)	Fine Line – 8 (+1)
Lizzo	"Cuz I Love You" "Truth Hurts" "Good as Hell" "Juice"	N/A; N/A; 66 (+9); N/A	Cuz I Love You – 35 (re-entry)
Dave	"Black"; Freestyle	100 (re-entry)	Psychodrama – 14 (+43)
Billie Eilish; Finneas; Johnny Marr; Hans Zimmer	"No Time to Die"	1 (debut)	When We All Fall Asleep, Where Do We Go? – 4 (+2); Don't Smile at Me – 13 (+4)
Celeste	"Strange"	N/A	N/A
Stormzy; Burna Boy; Tiana Major9	"Don't Forget to Breathe" "Do Better" "Wiley Flow" "Own It" (with elements of "Fortune Teller" by J Hus) "Anybody" (Burna Boy) "Rainfall"	N/A; N/A; N/A; 23 (+/–); N/A; N/A	Heavy Is the Head – 7 (+/–)
Rod Stewart; Royal Philharmonic Orchestra; Ronnie Wood; Kenney Jones	"I Don't Want to Talk About It" "Stay with Me"	N/A; N/A	You're in My Heart: Rod Stewart with the Royal Philharmonic Orchestra – 34 (–8)

== Winners and nominees ==
The winners are in bold.

British Album of the Year (presented by Billie Eilish and Finneas)	Song of the Year (presented by Tom Jones)
**Dave – Psychodrama**; Harry Styles – Fine Line; Lewis Capaldi – Divinely Uninspired to a Hellish Extent; Michael Kiwanuka – Kiwanuka; Stormzy – Heavy Is the Head	**Lewis Capaldi – "Someone You Loved"**; AJ Tracey – "Ladbroke Grove"; Calvin Harris and Rag'n'Bone Man – "Giant"; Dave featuring Burna Boy – "Location"; Ed Sheeran and Justin Bieber – "I Don't Care" (produced by Fred Again); Mabel – "Don't Call Me Up"; Mark Ronson featuring Miley Cyrus – "Nothing Breaks Like a Heart"; Sam Smith and Normani – "Dancing with a Stranger"; Stormzy – "Vossi Bop"; Tom Walker – "Just You and I"
British Male Solo Artist (presented by Ronnie Wood)	British Female Solo Artist (presented by Ellie Goulding and Jorja Smith)
**Stormzy**; Dave; Harry Styles; Lewis Capaldi; Michael Kiwanuka	**Mabel**; Charli XCX; FKA Twigs; Freya Ridings; Mahalia
British Group (presented by Anne-Marie, Courtney Love, and Hailee Steinfeld)	Best New Artist (presented by Clara Amfo and Niall Horan)
**Foals**; Bastille; Bring Me the Horizon; Coldplay; D-Block Europe	**Lewis Capaldi**; Aitch; Dave; Mabel; Sam Fender
International Male Solo Artist (presented by Kiefer Sutherland and Paloma Faith)	International Female Solo Artist (presented by Melanie C)
**Tyler, the Creator**; Bruce Springsteen; Burna Boy; Dermot Kennedy; Post Malone	**Billie Eilish**; Ariana Grande; Camila Cabello; Lana Del Rey; Lizzo
Rising Star Award (presented by Sam Fender)	British Producer of the Year
**Celeste**; Beabadoobee; Joy Crookes	**Fred Again**

== Multiple nominations and awards ==
Artists who received multiple nominations
Nominations	Artist
4	Dave
4	Lewis Capaldi
3	Mabel
3	Stormzy
2	Burna Boy
2	Harry Styles
2	Michael Kiwanuka
2	Fred Again

Artists who won multiple awards
Awards	Artist
2	Lewis Capaldi
