= WickedSkengMan 4 =

Single by Stormzy
- Released: 11 September 2015
- Genre: Grime; freestyle rap
- Length: 3:14
- Label: Self-released
- Producer(s): Jme

Stormzy singles chronology
"Know Me From" (2015)	"WickedSkengMan 4" (2015)	"Dude" (2015)

"WickedSkengMan 4" is a song by English rapper Stormzy. It was released as a single independently on 11 September 2015. The song peaked at number 18 on the UK Singles Chart.

The track was the first freestyle ever to break the top 20 of the UK Singles Chart. Previously, no grime freestyle had entered the top 40 (Jme's "96 Fuckries", from 2013, was ten copies short of a top 40 placing, instead peaking at number 41). Speaking about its success, Stormzy credited his fans as "the real winners; because with no label, and no radio play, there's no way in hell I could of done this. It sounds very cliche; but from the heart...thank you. They're like family to me. We've got a grime freestyle into the U.K. Top 20, history for us all."

PauL Gibbins of Vice wrote of the track: "This isn't a pop song, this isn’t a cheesy, urban-lite anthem – hell, it doesn't even have a chorus. Let's be clear about this: Stormzy is currently smashing the charts with a freestyle. This is King Stormzy at his most regal, riding the riddim with the kind of confidence required to go from Nick Jonas collabs to dropping bars over 'Functions on the Low' and expecting the same result." The B-side of the single, "Shut Up", is another freestyle. "The widespread response to both tracks," Gibbins added, "has been particularly amazing considering how harsh and uncompromising they are in their approach – this isn’t grime with bells on, or bars wrapped in cotton wool and a cute synth hook. Over the years, we’ve come to expect a shift away from the scene’s culture in terms of content and style, for any artist that seeks some Top 20 love."

== Music video ==
A music video to accompany the release of "WickedSkengMan 4" was first released onto YouTube on 10 September 2015.

== Charts ==
Chart (2015)	Peak position
UK Singles Downloads (OCC)	8
UK Indie (OCC)	2
UK Hip Hop/R&B (OCC)	2
UK Singles (OCC)	18

== Release history ==
Region	Date	Format	Label
United Kingdom	11 September 2015	Digital download	Self-released
