= Keisha the Sket =

2005 novel by Jade LB

Keisha the Sket (originally Keisha Da Sket) is an erotic coming-of-age novel, written by a 13-year-old Black London schoolgirl in text-speak, using Black British English. It was originally published online in instalments in the 2000s and went viral via smartphones. It was published in print for the first time in 2021, with the formerly anonymous author, now an academic, using the name Jade LB, and won the British Book Awards 2022 in the Discover Book of the Year category.

== Synopsis ==
Keisha is a 17-year-old "top sket" (sexually promiscuous woman) from the "ends" (the working-class, heavily minority outskirts of London), who finds she enjoys sex. The novel recounts her interactions with "the mandem" (boys), including both an idealised lover and a gang rape as well as non-sexual violence. A passage early in the book reads: "I lay bck dwn an jus thought abat all da eventz of yesterday. Imagine dat, I gt lashed twice, gt a hubby and shanked sum1! Rahhh!"

== Publication history ==
The author, who is of Caribbean heritage, was a 13-year-old living in North London and attending a girls' school in Hackney when she started writing her novel after being given her first computer. She modelled its structure on dramatic novels by writers such as Jacqueline Wilson and was inspired by African-American erotic fiction, in particular by Zane. She wrote in text-speak, using Black British English. Once her family was able to afford internet access, she published the novel on Piczo under the title Keisha Da Sket, as 18 chapters, which appeared in instalments from 2005 to 2007. The text was shared on smartphones via Bluetooth and SMS and spread virally. It was a seminal work for teens in the noughties; one reader tweeted in 2013, "I've only read 3 books in my life Keisha Da Sket, Of Mice And Men and the Argos Catalogue". Readers wrote their own "sket" novels in emulation, and their own continuations. The author originally had her name on the site, but in 2010 became anonymous.

A nostalgic buzz around the novel re-emerged on social media in 2017, and literary agent Rachel Mann contacted the author after her assistant, a young Black woman, brought it to her attention. In October 2021, the novel was published in print for the first time, as Keisha the Sket, by Stormzy's Penguin Random House imprint, #Merky Books. This edition includes an author's note and a retelling in standard English that amplifies some points and adds a new ending, with Keisha going to university. The author, credited as Jade LB, is now a part-time lecturer in African politics who also works with children and at-risk young women. She is executive producer for the Amazon original podcast +44 Presents:...The Noughties with presenters Eddie Kadi and Nadia Jae. After featuring in Stormzy's comeback video "Mel Made Me Do It", she revealed her identity as the author in a caption on her Instagram page: "our national treasure is back. #mmmdi #melmademedoit".

== Awards ==
Keisha the Sket was the first winner of the Discover Book of the Year award at the British Book Awards 2022.
