= Blinded by Your Grace =

Blinded by Your Grace may refer to:

- "Blinded by Your Grace, Pt. 1", 2017 song by English rapper Stormzy from his album Gang Signs & Prayer
- "Blinded by Your Grace, Pt. 2", 2017 song by English rapper Stormzy and singer MNEK from his album Gang Signs & Prayer
