= Let Me Down =

Single by Jorja Smith featuring Stormzy
- Released: 11 January 2018
- Recorded: 2016–2017
- Genre: Pop
- Length: 3:08
- Label: FAMM
- Songwriters: Jorja Smith; Michael Omari; Ed Thomas
- Producers: Paul Epworth; Ed Thomas

Jorja Smith singles chronology
"On My Mind" (2017)	"Let Me Down" (2018)	"3 February" (2018)

Stormzy singles chronology
"Blinded by Your Grace, Pt. 2" (2017)	"Let Me Down" (2018)	"Vossi Bop" (2019)

Music video
- "Let Me Down" on YouTube

"Let Me Down" is a song recorded by English singer Jorja Smith featuring rapper Stormzy. It was written by Smith, Stormzy and Ed Thomas, with production handled by Thomas and Paul Epworth. The song was released commercially for digital download on 11 January 2018.

== Background ==
The track, which was in the works for almost two years, premiered on Zane Lowe's Beats 1 radio show, where Smith spoke about the collaboration. "I remember I was in studio with [producer] Ed Thomas, and he was playing the chords on the piano and I was singing, and Stormzy kind of drifted in and out – that's kind of what he does on the verse. It was just beautiful and magical. I think we made a really special moment, and he's such a nice guy." She offered in another interview: "Stormzy like floated into the room, like came on the track – it's magic. That was 2016, and then I was in the studio with Ed and he came through to the session, but I had already wrote the beginning of it and then we just left verse 2. Stormzy was so late, so late. But it was cool because his verse made up for it and he is sick."

Smith added in a press release: "'Let Me Down' is about meaning very little to someone, but being okay with that, even though it hurts." She explained that the song was inspired by her dream of writing a James Bond theme song. "When I am writing music I sometimes envision a video playing alongside. 'Let Me Down' does sound quite Bond-y: you can imagine it during a scene when James Bond has gone down into an underground, dimly lit, secret bar and he approaches the Bond girl who is sitting at the bar looking very guilty because she's done something bad and let him down."

Ed Thomas, the song's co-writer and producer, revealed that the demo was recorded in a studio session late last winter. "It tends to be when Jorja and I write. We don't talk about what kind of music we'd like to create. We just talk about what's going on in life and how we're feeling... That's a really good thing when you're writing songs, 'cause then you know it's true."

== Critical reception ==
Raisa Bruner of Time deemed the song "an appropriately moody and haunting ballad" which allows "Smith's buttery voice shine over a rich piano-based melody, offset by Stormzy's depth". Xavier Hamilton of Vibe described the song as "addictive", writing that "Stormzy's gruff voice melts away with Jorja's smooth vocals". Sydnee Monday of NPR wrote in her review: "In 'Let Me Down,' there's no switching of spotlights because there's no stage after all. Instead, imagine a green-lit bar scene from a James Bond film, a symphony hall, or a vast night sky where you're watching stars collide as a story of the things we accept in spite of ourselves unfolds." Sheldon Pearce of Pitchfork called it "a haunting piano ballad that channels the gloom and ache that come with unrequited love" which features "barrelling piano chords, soaring notes, and soul-crushing hook". Robin Murray of Clash praised the song, describing it as "powerful" and "an absolute triumph", thanks to the prominent "impeccably soulful vocals", "heart-on-sleeve songwriting", and Stormzy's "humble bars". Rap-Up wrote that "the piano-laden track allows Jorja's soul-stirring vocals to shine brilliantly". Joe Reeve of HUH. regarded the song as "a huge pop ballad which shows off Smith's incredible vocals over a simple piano arrangement". He also praised Stormzy for delivering a powerful verse, calling it "an effortless speech full of emotion".

== Music video ==
The music video was released on 18 January 2018. In the video, which was filmed in Kyiv, Smith stars as a hitwoman who was hired to assassinate a male ballet dancer. However, the dancer is also her love interest, leading to series of struggling on Smith's side. Stormzy made a brief appearance at the end of the video as Smith's boss. Director Hector Dockrill, who previously worked with Smith on the video of 'On My Mind', spoke of the visual: "When I received the brief for this film it was pretty much just one word; Bond. Jorja and I put our heads together and played with the idea of her role being a strong female lead, in an entirely fictional world. Creating this setting and developing Jorja's character in giving her depth, soul and richness was a strong step in the direction of filmmaking I want to take, and the collaborative process with Jorja and everyone around us was definitely something we're eager to do again ASAP."

== Credits and personnel ==
Credits adapted from Tidal and YouTube.

- Jorja Smith – songwriting
- Stormzy – songwriting
- Ed Thomas – songwriting, production
- Paul Epworth – production
- Engine-Earz – mixing, mastering

== Charts ==
Chart (2018)	Peak position
Ireland (IRMA)	62
Scottish Singles Sales (Official Charts)	67
UK Singles (Official Charts)	34
UK Indie (Official Charts)	3

== Certifications ==
Region	Certification	Certified units/sales
United Kingdom (BPI)	Gold	400,000^{‡}
^{‡} Sales+streaming figures based on certification alone.
