= Know Me From =

Single by Stormzy
- Released: 8 March 2015
- Genre: Grime
- Length: 3:14
- Songwriter: Michael Omari
- Producer: Zdot

Stormzy singles chronology
"TRKRZ" (2015)	"Know Me From" (2015)	"WickedSkengMan 4" (2015)

Music video
- "Know Me From" on YouTube

"Know Me From" is a grime track by Stormzy, released independently on 8 March 2015. The song peaked at number 49 on the UK Singles Chart.

== Background and release ==
The instrumental used for "Know Me From" is called "Ninja" by Zdot. This was also used on Wiley's "BMO Field" freestyle, taken from his 2014 album Snakes and Ladders, and Kozzie's "Try Me".

"Know Me From" premiered on Logan Sama's Boiler Room showcase. Stormzy performed the track at the BBC Radio 1Xtra Prom in 2015.

== Music video ==
The one-take music video, directed by Omari's friend Jaiden Ramgeet, was released on 22 February 2015. It features appearances from Stormzy's mother and Inch from Section Boyz. The video has accumulated over 29 million YouTube views.

== Controversy ==
Wiley's younger brother, Cadell, was unimpressed with the way that Stormzy had used the same instrumental as his sibling but turned it into something marketable. He released the diss track "Hotline", directed at Stormzy among others, and Stormzy addressed these remarks (as well as Cadell's loaded tweets) on "Shut Up".

== In other media ==
The song is featured in the 2018 episode "Arachnids in the UK" of the show Doctor Who.

== Charts ==
=== Weekly charts ===
Chart (2015)	Peak position
UK Indie (OCC)	2
UK Hip Hop/R&B (OCC)	7
UK Singles (OCC)	49

== Certifications ==
Region	Certification	Certified units/sales
United Kingdom (BPI)	Gold	400,000^{‡}
^{‡} Sales+streaming figures based on certification alone.
