= Mel Made Me Do It =

Single by Stormzy
- Released: 23 September 2022
- Length: 7:20
- Label: 0207 Def Jam; #Merky
- Songwriters: Michael Omari; Alan Lomax; Andrew Jason Brown
- Producer: Knox Brown

Stormzy singles chronology
"Clash" (2021)	"Mel Made Me Do It" (2022)	"Hide & Seek" (2022)

Music video
- "Mel Made Me Do It" on YouTube

"Mel Made Me Do It" is a song by English rapper Stormzy, released as a single on 23 September 2022 through 0207 Def Jam and #Merky. It contains guest appearances from Jamaican musician Stylo G and English actress Michaela Coel. The song, Stormzy's longest, was written by him and producer Knox Brown. It was released alongside its 11-minute music video, which includes a variety of cameo appearances from Usain Bolt and Louis Theroux amongst others.

== Content ==
The song includes a guest appearance by Stylo G and a monologue performed by Michaela Coel that was written by Wretch 32. It is named for Stormzy's personal stylist Melissa's Wardrobe and her "direct influence" on him.

== Critical reception ==
Professional ratings
Review scores
Source	Rating
The Guardian	4/5 stars

Will Pritchard of The Guardian felt the track contains "boastful, whip-smart wordplay" and "slot[s] somewhere in the chasm" between Stormzy's modes of "choral, heaving and heartfelt" and "puff-chested flexing", ultimately describing it as a "testament to Stormzy's magnetism". Ellie Robinson of NME wrote that the song "stands out with its minimalistic, progressive instrumental, buzzing along with sharp 808 beats and modulated string-work" accompanying "Stormzy's vicious flow".

== Music video ==
The song's music video, released alongside the song, was directed by KLVDR and includes cameo appearances from Usain Bolt, Jonathan Ross, Louis Theroux, José Mourinho, Dave, Little Simz, Dina Asher-Smith, Headie One, Gabrielle, Ian Wright, Brenda Edwards, Stylo G, Trevor Nelson, Jme, Julie Adenuga, Walé Adeyemi and Stormzy's family, among others.

== Charts ==
Chart performance for "Mel Made Me Do It"
Chart (2022)	Peak position
Ireland (IRMA)	25
Netherlands (Single Tip)	17
New Zealand Hot Singles (RMNZ)	7
Sweden Heatseeker (Sverigetopplistan)	18
UK Singles (OCC)	12
UK Hip Hop/R&B (OCC)	5
