= Taste (Make It Shake) =

Song by British rapper Aitch

Single by Aitch

from the EP AitcH2O
- Released: 31 July 2019
- Length: 3:33
- Label: Since 93
- Songwriters: Harrison Armstrong; Jake Jones; James Murray; Mustafa Omer
- Producer: Whyjay

Aitch singles chronology
"Kilos" (2019)	"Taste (Make It Shake)" (2019)	"AitcH20 Freestyle" (2019)

Music video
- "Taste (Make It Shake)" on YouTube

"Taste (Make It Shake)" is a song recorded by British rapper Aitch, released as the lead single from Aitch's second extended play AitcH20 on 31 July 2019. The song was written by Aitch, Jake Jones, James Murray and Mustafa Omer, and produced by Whyjay.

A remix featuring Stefflon Don and Fenix Flexin was released on 30 August 2019. And an Australian remix featuring Hooligan Hefs and Nerve which was released on 1 November 2019.

Commercially, the song became Aitch's first solo chart appearance on the UK Singles Chart when it debuted at number eight on 9 August 2019 – for the week ending dated 15 August 2019. It eventually peaked at number two.

== Charts ==
=== Weekly charts ===
Chart (2019)	Peak position
Ireland (IRMA)	12
Italy (FIMI) Remix featuring Shiva	17
Netherlands (Single Top 100)	61
Scotland Singles (OCC)	8
UK Singles (OCC)	2
UK Hip Hop/R&B (OCC)	2

=== Year-end charts ===
Chart (2019)	Position
UK Singles (Official Charts Company)	45

== Certifications ==
Region	Certification	Certified units/sales
Italy (FIMI)	Gold	50,000^{‡}
United Kingdom (BPI)	2× Platinum	1,200,000^{‡}
^{‡} Sales+streaming figures based on certification alone.

== Release history ==
Region	Date	Version	Format	Label
Various	31 July 2019	Original	Digital download; streaming	Since 93
Various	30 August 2019	Remix	Digital download; streaming	Since 93
