= Heavy Is the Head (album) =

Studio album by Stormzy
- Released: 13 December 2019
- Genres: British hip hop; soul; grime
- Length: 53:36
- Labels: #Merky; Atlantic Records UK
- Producers: AdotSkitz; Chris Andoh; EY; Jay Weathers; Fred Gibson; Illmind; Jimmy Napes; Fraser T Smith; MJ Cole

Stormzy chronology
Gang Signs & Prayer (2017)	Heavy Is the Head (2019)	This Is What I Mean (2022)

Singles from Heavy Is the Head
- 1. "Vossi Bop" Released: 25 April 2019; 2. "Crown" Released: 21 June 2019; 3. "Wiley Flow" Released: 15 September 2019; 4. "Own It" Released: 22 November 2019; 5. "Audacity" Released: 11 December 2019

Heavy Is the Head (abbreviated to h.i.t.h on the album cover) is the second studio album by British rapper Stormzy. It was released on 13 December 2019 through #Merky Records and Atlantic Records UK. The album features collaborations with Aitch, Burna Boy, Ed Sheeran, Headie One, H.E.R., and Yebba.

Heavy Is the Head was supported by the singles "Vossi Bop", "Crown", "Wiley Flow" and "Own It". "Vossi Bop" was Stormzy's first number-one song on the UK Singles Chart, while "Own It" also reached number one on the chart. Additionally, "Crown" reached the top 10 on the chart. Heavy Is the Head debuted at number two on the UK Albums Chart, behind Rod Stewart's You're in My Heart: Rod Stewart with the Royal Philharmonic Orchestra and ahead of Harry Styles' Fine Line. It eventually topped the chart on 10 January 2020.

Heavy Is the Head received widespread acclaim from critics upon release, being nominated at the Brit Awards for British Album of the Year, while "Vossi Bop" for British Song of the Year. By January 2020, it was certified Platinum by the British Phonographic Industry (BPI).

The album's title comes from the title line of "Crown".

== Promotion ==
The album was promoted with numerous projections of the initials H.I.T.H around London. Stormzy officially announced the album through his social media on 19 November, revealing the track list and cover art, which shows him holding the stab proof vest featuring a black-and-white Union Jack that he wore during his set at the Glastonbury Festival 2019, designed by Banksy.

== Critical reception ==
Professional ratings
Aggregate scores
Source	Rating
AnyDecentMusic?	7.7/10
Metacritic	82/100
Review scores
Source	Rating
AllMusic	4/5 stars
The Daily Telegraph	4/5 stars
Financial Times	4/5 stars
The Guardian	4/5 stars
The Independent	4/5 stars
NME	4/5 stars
The Observer	4/5 stars
Pitchfork	7.0/10
Q	4/5 stars
The Times	4/5 stars

Upon release, Heavy Is the Head received widespread acclaim from critics. At Metacritic, which assigns a normalised rating out of 100 to reviews from mainstream critics, the album received an average score of 82, based on 17 reviews.

Carl Anka of NME described Heavy Is the Head as "a broad-reaching, genre-buckling romp that – while sometimes overreaching – never gets dull or overstays its welcome." Praising its exploration of genres and themes, Kitty Empire wrote for The Observer, "The spaciousness, punch and depth of these productions is telling, but it is a mark of [Heavy Is the Head's] artistic integrity that Stormzy manages to transcend genre (again) without sacrificing his core griminess, or losing too much in the way of accent, word choice, content or theme."

The album was shortlisted for the Mercury Prize 2020, the second time in his career.

== Track listing ==
No.	Title	Writer(s)	Producer(s)	Length
1.	"Big Michael"	Michael Omari; Fred Gibson	Fred; Fraser T. Smith^{[b]}	2:26
2.	"Audacity" (featuring Headie One)	Omari; Irving Adjei; Smith	Smith	4:06
3.	"Crown"	Omari; James Napier; Matthew James Firth Coleman	Napes; MJ Cole	3:33
4.	"Rainfall" (featuring Tiana Major9)	Omari; Jay Weathers; Erica Campbell; Tina Campbell; Warryn Campbell	Weathers; Aod^{[b]}	3:18
5.	"Rachael's Little Brother"	Omari; Abdul Bello; Cherise Roberts; Eyobed Getachew; John Horsley; Michael Brown; Michael Mugisha; Nadia Shepherd; Temi Aisida; Thelma Howell	EY	5:38
6.	"Handsome"	Omari; Adam Feeney; Tyler Williams	Dukes; T-Minus	2:33
7.	"Do Better"	Omari; Smith	Smith	4:09
8.	"Don't Forget to Breathe" (featuring Yebba) (interlude)	Omari; Paul Epworth	PRGRSHN; Smith	2:21
9.	"One Second" (featuring H.E.R.)	Omari; Dan Caplen; Owen Cutts	Cutts; Aod^{[b]}	4:01
10.	"Pop Boy" (featuring Aitch)	Omari; Harrison Armstrong; Gibson	Fred; Toddla T^{[b]}	2:33
11.	"Own It" (featuring Ed Sheeran and Burna Boy)	Omari; Ed Sheeran; Damini Ogulu; Gibson	Fred; Weathers^{[b]}	3:37
12.	"Wiley Flow"	Omari; Getachew; Fateh Mohammed Aminur Rahman; Richard Kylea Cowie Jr.	!llmind; Adotskitz; EY	3:27
13.	"Bronze"	Omari; Jonathan Lee	Weathers; Cardiak	2:25
14.	"Superheroes"	Omari; Weathers; Alastair O'Donnell; Brian Steven Harris; Lee; Natalie Jordan; Nigel Lowis	Weathers; Aod	3:32
15.	"Lessons"	Omari; Ed Thomas	Thomas	3:08
16.	"Vossi Bop"	Omari; Chris Andoh; ANDERSON; Dakarai Forbes	Andoh	3:16
Total length:				53:36

Japanese edition bonus track
No.	Title	Writer(s)	Producer(s)	Length
17.	"Sounds of the Skeng"	Omari; Karl Joseph	Sir Spyro	3:32
Total length:				57:40

Sample credits

- "Rainfall" contains a sample of "Shackles (Praise You)" written by Erica Campbell, Tina Campbell and Warryn Campbell and performed by Mary Mary. The song was featured on the video game Watch Dogs: Legion under the title "Fall on My Enemies".
- "Rachael's Little Brother" contains elements of "Baby Boy" written by Cherise Roberts, Eyobed Getachew, John Horsley, Michael Brown, Michael Mugisha, Nadia Shepherd, Temi Aisida and Thelma Howell and performed by Big Brovaz.
- "Superheroes" contains an interpolation of "Someday" written by Lee Jordan and Nigel Lowis and performed by Keisha White, which is the theme song to the CBBC show The Story of Tracy Beaker.

== Charts ==
=== Weekly charts ===
Chart (2019–2020)	Peak position
Australian Albums (ARIA)	11
Belgian Albums (Ultratop Flanders)	25
Canadian Albums (Billboard)	57
Danish Albums (Hitlisten)	6
Dutch Albums (Album Top 100)	10
German Albums (Offizielle Top 100)	84
Irish Albums (IRMA)	3
New Zealand Albums (RMNZ)	20
Norwegian Albums (VG-lista)	13
Scottish Albums (Official Charts)	5
Swedish Albums (Sverigetopplistan)	34
Swiss Albums (Schweizer Hitparade)	29
UK Albums (Official Charts)	1
US Heatseekers Albums (Billboard)	16

=== Year-end charts ===
Chart (2019)	Position
UK Albums (OCC)	58

Chart (2020)	Position
Australian Albums (ARIA)	70
Belgian Albums (Ultratop Flanders)	87
Danish Albums (Hitlisten)	22
Dutch Albums (Album Top 100)	44
Irish Albums (IRMA)	14
UK Albums (OCC)	5

== Certifications ==
Region	Certification	Certified units/sales
Denmark (IFPI Danmark)	2× Platinum	180,000^{‡}
United Kingdom (BPI)	Platinum	300,000^{‡}
^{‡} Sales+streaming figures based on certification alone.
