= Sounds of the Skeng =

Single by Stormzy
- Released: 6 September 2019
- Genre: Grime
- Length: 3:34
- Label: #Merky; Atlantic
- Songwriters: Michael Omari; Karl Joseph
- Producer: Sir Spyro

Stormzy singles chronology
"Take Me Back to London" (2019)	"Sounds of the Skeng" (2019)	"Wiley Flow" (2019)

Music video
- "Sounds of the Skeng" on YouTube

"Sounds of the Skeng" is a song by English rapper Stormzy, released on 6 September 2019.

== Promotion ==
Stormzy revealed the song on 29 August 2019, posting a picture with the caption "You lot think you're fucking funny yeah kool 🥊 6/9/19 #SoundsOfTheSkeng" A teaser of the song preceded its release.

== Reception ==
Clash's Robin Murray described "Sounds of the Skeng" as "a muscular workout from Stormzy, a bass-bin rattler that taps into his incredible live energy". Aron A. of HotNewHipHop called the song "a hard-hitting banger that serves as a reminder of his grime roots". Writing for Complex, James Keith stated that it "sees Stormzy at his most direct, calling out the fakes and those too keen to seek the approval of US artists, all while Spyro's snarling bass line glowers menacingly in the background".

Rolling Stone's Emily Zemler described "Sounds of the Skeng" as a "fast-talking track" and a "hard-punching number". David Renshaw of The Fader called the song "a skippy and light-hearted moment".

== Personnel ==
Credits adapted from Tidal.

- Stormzy – vocals
- Sir Spyro – production, programming
- Joker – mixing, mastering

== Charts ==
Chart (2019)	Peak position
Ireland (IRMA)	33
New Zealand Hot Singles (RMNZ)	26
Scotland Singles (OCC)	49
UK Singles (OCC)	20
UK Hip Hop/R&B (OCC)	15

== Certifications ==
Region	Certification	Certified units/sales
United Kingdom (BPI)	Silver	200,000^{‡}
^{‡} Sales+streaming figures based on certification alone.
