= Audacity (song) =

2019 single by Stormzy

Single by Stormzy featuring Headie One

from the album Heavy Is the Head
- Released: 11 December 2019
- Length: 4:06
- Label: #Merky; Warner; ADA
- Songwriters: Michael Omari; Fraser T. Smith; Headie One
- Producer: Fraser T. Smith

Stormzy singles chronology
"Own It" (2019)	"Audacity" (2019)	"Disappointed" (2020)

Music video
- "Audacity" on YouTube

"Audacity" is a song by English rapper Stormzy, featuring vocals from British rapper and songwriter Headie One. It was released as a single on 11 December 2019 as the fifth single from his second studio album Heavy Is the Head.

== Music video ==
A music video to accompany the release of "Audacity" was first released onto YouTube on 11 December 2019.

== Charts ==
Chart (2019)	Peak position
Ireland (IRMA)	8
UK Singles (OCC)	6
UK Hip Hop/R&B (OCC)	2

== Certifications ==
Certifications for "Audacity"
Region	Certification	Certified units/sales
New Zealand (RMNZ)	Gold	15,000^{‡}
United Kingdom (BPI)	Gold	400,000^{‡}
^{‡} Sales+streaming figures based on certification alone.

== Release history ==
Region	Date	Format	Label
United Kingdom	11 December 2019	Digital download; streaming	#Merky; Warner; ADA
