= Take Me Back to London =

2019 single by Ed Sheeran featuring Stormzy

Single by Ed Sheeran featuring Stormzy

from the album No.6 Collaborations Project
- Released: 9 August 2019
- Genre: Grime
- Length: 3:09
- Label: Asylum; Atlantic
- Songwriters: Ed Sheeran; Shellback; Max Martin; Fred Gibson; Michael Omari Jr.
- Producers: Skrillex; Kenny Beats; Fred

Ed Sheeran singles chronology
"Antisocial" / "South of the Border" (2019)	"Take Me Back to London" (2019)	"Own It" (2019)

Stormzy singles chronology
"Crown" (2019)	"Take Me Back to London" (2019)	"Sounds of the Skeng" (2019)

Lyric video
- "Take Me Back to London" on YouTube

"Take Me Back to London" is a song by British singer-songwriter Ed Sheeran featuring British rapper Stormzy. It was released through Asylum and Atlantic Records as the final single from the former's fourth studio album No.6 Collaborations Project (2019).

The song was written by the artists alongside Shellback, Max Martin, and Fred, who produced it alongside Skrillex and Kenny Beats. The song reached number one on the UK Singles Chart following the release of its remix.

== Background and composition ==
Sheeran and Stormzy previously performed together at the 2017 Brit Awards. "Take Me Back to London" was announced as part of the tracklist for No.6 Collaborations Project (2019).

"Take Me Back to London" is a grime song. According to HotNewHipHop's Aron A., Sheeran "shows off his bars on the record while swapping verses with Stormzy". The song sees Sheeran "brag" about the gross of his ÷ Tour.

== Critical reception ==
Time's Raisa Bruner wrote that the trap beat on "Take Me Back to London" gets "Sheeran's melodic touch, with Stormzy jumping in from the start to boost the energy with his signature vibrancy". Jon Caramanica of The New York Times wrote that Stormzy "does an admirable job of rapping ferociously but politely enough to not upstage the host", criticising the line "It's that time, big Mike and Teddy are on grime".

== Commercial performance ==
"Take Me Back to London" achieved success in the United Kingdom, where it debuted at number three and later reached number one on the UK Singles Chart, becoming the third single from No.6 Collaborations Project to reach the summit of the chart. It was Sheeran's eighth and Stormzy's second number one in the UK.

== Charts ==
=== Weekly charts ===
Chart (2019)	Peak position
Australia (ARIA)	29
Belgium (Ultratip Bubbling Under Flanders)	27
Belgium Urban (Ultratop Flanders)	22
Canada Hot 100 (Billboard)	59
Czech Republic Singles Digital (ČNS IFPI)	21
Denmark (Tracklisten)	26
Germany (GfK)	68
Hungary (Stream Top 40)	38
Ireland (IRMA)	7
Latvia (LAIPA)	22
Lithuania (AGATA)	79
Netherlands (Single Top 100)	69
New Zealand (Recorded Music NZ)	29
Romania (Airplay 100)	73
Scottish Singles Sales (Official Charts)	8
Slovakia Singles Digital (ČNS IFPI)	17
Sweden (Sverigetopplistan)	44
UK Singles (Official Charts)	1
US Bubbling Under Hot 100 (Billboard)	16
US Rolling Stone Top 100	62

=== Year-end charts ===
Chart (2019)	Position
UK Singles (Official Charts Company)	23

== Certifications ==
Region	Certification	Certified units/sales
Canada (Music Canada)	Platinum	80,000^{‡}
Denmark (IFPI Danmark)	Gold	45,000^{‡}
New Zealand (RMNZ)	Platinum	30,000^{‡}
Poland (ZPAV)	Gold	25,000^{‡}
United Kingdom (BPI)	3× Platinum	1,800,000^{‡}
^{‡} Sales+streaming figures based on certification alone.

== Release history ==
Region	Date	Format	Label	Ref.
United Kingdom	9 August 2019	Contemporary hit radio	Atlantic; Asylum	

== Remix ==
"Take Me Back to London (Sir Spyro Remix)"

Remix by Ed Sheeran featuring Stormzy, Jaykae and Aitch

from the album No.6 Collaborations Project
- Released: 23 August 2019
- Length: 3:51
- Label: Asylum; Atlantic
- Songwriters: Ed Sheeran; Shellback; Karl Sandberg; Frederik Gibson; Michael Omari Jr.
- Producers: Sir Spyro; Skrillex; Kenny Beats; Fred

Jaykae singles chronology
"Chat" (2019)	"Take Me Back to London (Sir Spyro Remix)" (2019)	Faded (2019)

Aitch singles chronology
"AitcH20 Freestyle" (2019)	"Take Me Back to London (Sir Spyro Remix)" (2019)	"Kilos" (2019)

Music video
- "Take Me Back to London (Sir Spyro Remix)" on YouTube

"Take Me Back to London (Sir Spyro Remix)", featuring English rappers Stormzy, Jaykae and Aitch was released as a single on 23 August 2019.

=== Music video ===
A music video for the Sir Spyro remix was shot between Manchester, Birmingham and London by director KC Locke. It opens with images of Sheeran and Stormzy ripping the countryside in a Rolls-Royce Cullinan while wearing matching tracksuits and getting measured for bespoke suits. Jaykae and Aitch soon join them to watch some motorcycle burnouts. Along the way, there is plenty of quintessentially British activity, including a spot of tea, late-night post-pub grubbing and copious pints chugged.

=== Track listing ===
Digital download and streaming
No.	Title	Length
1.	"Take Me Back to London" (Remix) (featuring Stormzy, Jaykae and Aitch)	3:52
2.	"Take Me Back to London" (Sir Spyro Remix) (featuring Stormzy, Jaykae and Aitch)	3:51

=== Release history ===
Region	Date	Format	Version	Label	Ref.
Various	23 August 2019	Digital download; streaming	Original + Sir Spyro remix	Atlantic; Asylum	
United Kingdom	13 September 2019	Contemporary hit radio	Sir Spyro remix	Atlantic; Asylum	
