= Blinded by Your Grace, Pt. 2 =

Single by Stormzy featuring MNEK

from the album Gang Signs & Prayer
- Released: 27 October 2017
- Genre: Hip hop soul; gospel
- Length: 3:50
- Label: #Merky; Warner
- Songwriter(s): Michael Omari; Fraser T. Smith; Uzoechi Emenike
- Producer(s): Fraser T. Smith; Stormzy (add.)

Stormzy singles chronology
"Momma's Prayers" (2017)	"Blinded by Your Grace, Pt. 2" (2017)	"Let Me Down" (2018)

MNEK singles chronology
"Deeper" (2017)	"Blinded by Your Grace, Pt. 2" (2017)	"Tongue" (2018)

Music video
- "Blinded by Your Grace, Pt. 2" on YouTube

"Blinded by Your Grace, Pt. 2" is a song written and performed by English rapper Stormzy featuring British singer MNEK. It was released on 27 October 2017 as the fourth single from his debut studio album, Gang Signs & Prayer, where its first part is placed in the track listing. It was produced by Fraser T. Smith. Peaking at number seven on the UK Singles Chart, it became his second-highest-charting single, behind "Big for Your Boots", the lead single from the LP released back in February 2017.

== Music video ==
The music video for the single was uploaded via Stormzy's YouTube channel on 17 December 2017, and has over 34 million views as of October 2022.

== Track listing ==
Digital download
No.	Title	Length
1.	"Blinded by Your Grace, Pt. 2"	3:50

== Charts ==
=== Weekly charts ===
Chart (2017)	Peak position
UK Singles (OCC)	7
UK Indie (OCC)	1

=== Year-end charts ===
Chart (2018)	Position
UK Singles (Official Charts Company)	92

== Certifications ==
Region	Certification	Certified units/sales
New Zealand (RMNZ)	Gold	15,000^{‡}
United Kingdom (BPI)	2× Platinum	1,200,000^{‡}
^{‡} Sales+streaming figures based on certification alone.
