= Wiley Flow =

Song by British rapper Stormzy

Single by Stormzy

from the album Heavy Is the Head
- Released: 15 September 2019
- Length: 3:27
- Label: #Merky; Atlantic
- Songwriters: Michael Omari; Eyobed Getachew; Richard Kylea Cowie Jr.
- Producers: EY; AdotSkitz; Illmind

Stormzy singles chronology
"Sounds of the Skeng" (2019)	"Wiley Flow" (2019)	"Own It" (2019)

Music video
- "Wiley Flow" on YouTube

"Wiley Flow" is a song by English rapper Stormzy, released on 15 September 2019 through #Merky and Atlantic Records as the third single from his second studio album, Heavy Is the Head. The song is a homage to British grime MC Wiley that interpolates flows from his tracks "Bad 'Em Up" and "Nightbus Dubplate". The cover art also mirrors his mixtape, Tunnel Vision Vol 1 (2007).

== Critical reception ==
Writing for Fact, Henry Bruce-Jones called it a salute to the "godfather of grime" on which Stormzy "cribs flows" from Wiley and "go[es] in on" over a "murky instrumental". Karen Gwee of NME labelled it "hard-hitting", while Sajae Elder of The Fader described it as Stormzy "racing through a series of number and OG checks ("If you can't do 10K first week then I don't wanna hear no chat about numbers')".

== Music video ==
The music video features Stormzy rapping the song while "surrounded by his friends in a gloomy basement".

== Charts ==
Chart performance for "Wiley Flow"
Chart (2019)	Peak position
Ireland (IRMA)	30
New Zealand Hot Singles (RMNZ)	21
Scottish Singles Sales (Official Charts)	59
UK Singles (Official Charts)	22
UK Hip Hop/R&B (Official Charts)	25

== Certifications ==
Certifications for "Wiley Flow"
Region	Certification	Certified units/sales
Denmark (IFPI Danmark)	Gold	45,000^{‡}
New Zealand (RMNZ)	Platinum	30,000^{‡}
United Kingdom (BPI)	Platinum	600,000^{‡}
^{‡} Sales+streaming figures based on certification alone.
