= Crown (Stormzy song) =

Single by Stormzy

from the album Heavy Is the Head
- Released: 21 June 2019
- Genre: Neo soul, UK rap
- Label: #Merky; Atlantic
- Songwriter(s): Michael Omari; James Napier; Matthew James Firth Colman
- Producer(s): Jimmy Napes; MJ Cole

Stormzy singles chronology
"Shine Girl" (2019)	"Crown" (2019)	"Take Me Back to London" (2019)

Music video
- "Crown" (Performance video) on YouTube

"Crown" is a song by English rapper Stormzy, released on 21 June 2019 as the second single from his second studio album, Heavy Is the Head. It debuted at number five on the UK Singles Chart dated 28 June 2019 and peaked at number four the following week.

== Promotion ==
Stormzy revealed the song on 19 June, posting a picture with the caption "Where words fail, music speaks."

== Personnel ==
Credits adapted from Tidal.

Vocals

- Stormzy – primary artist
- LJ Singers – choir

- Lawrence Johnson – choral backing vocals, choir arranger
- Margo Muzangaza – choral backing vocals
- Patricia Scott – choral backing vocals
- Rachael Sanniez – choral backing vocals
- Tarna-Renae Johnson – choral backing vocals
- Wayne Hernandez – choral backing vocals
- Wendi Rose – choral backing vocals

Technical

- Jimmy Napes – production
- MJ Cole – production, drum programming, engineering, keyboards
- Duncan Fuller – engineering
- Gus Pirelli – recording
- Mark "Spike" Stent – mixing
- Matt Wolach – mixing
- Michael Freeman – mixing
- Stuart Hawkes – mastering

== Charts ==
=== Weekly charts ===
Chart (2019)	Peak position
Belgium (Ultratip Bubbling Under Flanders)	22
Ireland (IRMA)	6
New Zealand Hot Singles (RMNZ)	15
Scotland (OCC)	13
Slovakia (Rádio Top 100)	60
UK Singles (OCC)	4

=== Year-end charts ===
Chart (2019)	Position
UK Singles (Official Charts Company)	97

== Certifications ==
Region	Certification	Certified units/sales
Denmark (IFPI Danmark)	Gold	45,000^{‡}
United Kingdom (BPI)	Platinum	600,000^{‡}
^{‡} Sales+streaming figures based on certification alone.
