= Vossi Bop =

Single by Stormzy

from the album Heavy Is the Head
- Released: 25 April 2019
- Genre: British hip hop
- Length: 3:16
- Label: #Merky; Atlantic
- Songwriters: Anderson; Chris Andoh; Dakarai Forbes; Michael Omari
- Producer: Chris Andoh

Stormzy singles chronology
"Let Me Down" (2018)	"Vossi Bop" (2019)	"Shine Girl" (2019)

Music video
- "Vossi Bop" on YouTube

"Vossi Bop" is a song by British rapper Stormzy. It was released as a single on 25 April 2019 through #Merky and Atlantic Records as the lead single from his second studio album, Heavy Is the Head. The music video was also released the same day. It is his first solo music since his Gang Signs & Prayer album in 2017. The song debuted atop the UK Singles Chart, becoming Stormzy's first number-one single.

== Background ==
Stormzy first penned this song around 2015 to 2016 after meeting a fan by the name of "Vossi", whom he saw energetically dancing to one of his songs. The song is Stormzy's first new music as a lead artist since 2017, when he released his UK number-one album Gang Signs & Prayer. During his time away, he pursued interests outside of music.

Upon the song's release, Stormzy corrected several users on Twitter who had misheard the first line as "My bruddas don't die, we just Vossi bop", stressing that it was "dab" and not "die".

=== 'Fuck Boris' ===
The song features an explicit indignant statement towards Boris Johnson, then Foreign Secretary and eventual British Prime Minister at the time of its production and release which goes: “I could never die, I’m Chuck Norris / fuck the government, fuck Boris”.

Stormzy made the line part of a crowd sing-along during his live performance at the 2019 Glastonbury Festival, which was telecasted live by the BBC. In December of the same year, he did the same with Harry Styles during a private concert by the latter.

== Music video ==
The music video was directed by Henry Scholfield and released on 25 April 2019. It features Stormzy rapping on Westminster Bridge and outside the Bank of England. Idris Elba makes a guest appearance. The Dutch choreographer and dancer Shay Latukolan provided the choreography for the video.

== Remixes ==
Four remixes of the song were released on 19 July 2019. Respectively, they featured Norwegian artist Lauren, Italian rapper Ghali, Swedish duo Aden x Asme, and German rappers Bausa and Capo.

== Commercial performance ==
On the midweek UK Singles Chart, Stormzy was at number one, ahead of "Me!" by Taylor Swift featuring Brendon Urie by some 500 combined sales. Several media outlets, including the BBC and Noisey, made note that it could be Stormzy's first UK number-one single. The song debuted at number one on the official chart ahead of previous number one, "Old Town Road" by Lil Nas X, and Swift's "Me!" at numbers two and three, respectively. "Vossi Bop" also received 12.7 million streams in its debut week on sale, the highest ever by a rapper and the fifth-highest of all time.

== Charts ==
=== Weekly charts ===
Chart (2019)	Peak position
Australia (ARIA)	34
Belgium (Ultratip Bubbling Under Flanders)	20
Denmark (Tracklisten)	30
Ireland (IRMA)	4
Lithuania (AGATA)	63
New Zealand (Recorded Music NZ)	34
Scottish Singles Sales (Official Charts)	14
Sweden (Sverigetopplistan)	10
UK Singles (Official Charts)	1
UK Hip Hop/R&B (Official Charts)	1

=== Year-end charts ===
Chart (2019)	Position
Ireland (IRMA)	17
Sweden (Sverigetopplistan) Remix version featuring Aden x Asme	67
UK Singles (OCC)	7
Chart (2020)	Position
UK Singles (OCC)	91

== Certifications ==
Region	Certification	Certified units/sales
Australia (ARIA)	3× Platinum	210,000^{‡}
Denmark (IFPI Danmark)	Platinum	90,000^{‡}
New Zealand (RMNZ)	2× Platinum	60,000^{‡}
Poland (ZPAV)	Gold	25,000^{‡}
United Kingdom (BPI)	3× Platinum	1,800,000^{‡}
Streaming
Sweden (GLF)	2× Platinum	16,000,000^{†}
^{‡} Sales+streaming figures based on certification alone.^{†} Streaming-only figures based on certification alone.
