= Shut Up (Stormzy song) =

Song by Stormzy

from the album Gang Signs & Prayer
- Released: 1 May 2015
- Genre: Grime
- Length: 3:03
- Label: Stormzy
- Songwriter(s): Michael Omari
- Producer(s): XTC

"Shut Up" is a song by English rapper Stormzy. The song was released independently for digital download in the United Kingdom on 11 September 2015 as the B-side to the "WickedSkengMan 4" single. It was produced by XTC and written by Stormzy. "Shut Up" was originally released as a freestyle video in May 2015 but gained popularity over the year.

The song initially entered at number 59 on the UK Singles Chart in September 2015; however, following an unsuccessful Christmas number one campaign, the song rose to number eight. To date, the song has sold over one million copies worldwide.

== Background ==
The instrumental to the song was produced by grime producer XTC. Titled "Functions on the Low" and originally released by grime collective Ruff Sqwad in 2004, it became one of the most well-known and popular grime instrumentals, and was first vocalled by Discarda on his track "Havana". "Shut Up" was initially only available as a freestyled performance on YouTube in May 2015. Due to the popularity of the song, a studio version was recorded and released alongside the "WickedSkengMan 4" single, which entered and peaked at number 18 on the UK Singles Chart. It became Stormzy's first top 40 entry.

At the 2015 BRIT Awards, Kanye West called upon Skepta to invite "30 goons" onstage during his performance of "All Day". Skepta chose to invite a collective of grime MCs and British rappers to represent their music scene, and among these was Stormzy. Fellow artists Big Narstie and J Spades downplayed this achievement, calling Stormzy a "backup dancer" during the performance. Stormzy directly acknowledges this in the opening lyrics of "Shut Up".

The line "Mention my name in your tweets / Oi rudeboy, shut up" is widely believed to be addressing Cadell, an East London MC and the younger half-brother of Wiley. Throughout 2015, Cadell released a series of diss tracks entitled "Hotline", in which he directly insulted and "sent for" Stormzy. These were accompanied by a series of insulting tweets. "Shut Up", as well as Stormzy's other songs "Standard", "Hear Dis" and "Scary", are regarded as being diss tracks in response to Cadell.

=== Christmas number one campaign ===
On 12 December 2015, Stormzy performed "Shut Up" during British heavyweight boxer Anthony Joshua's ring-walk for his fight versus Dillian Whyte. After the performance, the song climbed up the iTunes chart and into the top 40. As a result, Stormzy launched a Christmas number one campaign on 13 December to get the song to number one in order to rival with The X Factor winner's single "Forever Young" by Louisa Johnson. "Shut Up" ultimately entered higher than "Forever Young" by one position.

== Freestyle video ==
On 17 May 2015, Stormzy performed a freestyle to "Functions on the Low" in a video on his YouTube channel, which would later become "Shut Up." The video was shot by his fan in a South London car park. The video gradually gained millions of views and had reached just under 60 million views as of June 2017 and 100 million as at February 2020.

== Track listing ==
Digital download
No.	Title	Writer(s)	Producer(s)	Length
1.	"WickedSkengMan 4 (Studio Version)"	Michael Omari	Jme	3:14
2.	"Shut Up (Studio Version)"	Michael Omari	XTC	3:00
Total length:				6:14

== Chart performance ==
On 24 September 2015, "Shut Up" entered the UK Singles Chart at number 59, while its partnered single "WickedSkengMan 4" entered and peaked at number 18 in the same week. Following the failed Christmas number one campaign, "Shut Up" rose from number 99 to number eight on 18 December 2015, becoming Stormzy's second highest-charting single. The song charted at number one on the UK R&B Chart and number three on the UK Indie Chart.

== Charts ==
=== Weekly charts ===
Chart (2015)	Peak position
Ireland (IRMA)	79
Scotland (OCC)	18
UK Singles (OCC)	8
UK Indie (OCC)	3
UK Hip Hop/R&B (OCC)	1

=== Year-end charts ===
Chart (2016)	Position
UK Singles (Official Charts Company)	93

== Certifications ==
Region	Certification	Certified units/sales
Denmark (IFPI Danmark)	Gold	45,000^{‡}
New Zealand (RMNZ)	Platinum	30,000^{‡}
United Kingdom (BPI)	2× Platinum	1,200,000^{‡}
^{‡} Sales+streaming figures based on certification alone.

== Release history ==
Region	Date	Label	Format
Worldwide	11 September 2015	Stormzy	Digital download
