= Own It =

2019 song by Stormzy featuring Ed Sheeran and Burna Boy

Single by Stormzy featuring Ed Sheeran and Burna Boy

from the album Heavy Is the Head
- Released: 22 November 2019
- Genre: Dancehall
- Length: 3:37
- Label: #Merky; Atlantic
- Songwriters: Michael Omari; Ed Sheeran; Fred Gibson; Damini Ogulu
- Producers: FRED; Jay Weathers

Stormzy singles chronology
| "Wiley Flow" (2019) | "Own It" (2019) | "Audacity" (2019) |

Ed Sheeran singles chronology
| "Take Me Back to London" (2019) | "Own It" (2019) | "Afterglow" (2020) |

Burna Boy singles chronology
| "All In" (2019) | "Own It" (2019) | "Money Play" (2019) |

Music video
- "Own It" on YouTube

"Own It" is a song by English rapper Stormzy featuring English singer Ed Sheeran and Nigerian singer Burna Boy, released on 22 November 2019 through #Merky and Atlantic Records as the fourth single from Stormzy's second studio album, Heavy Is the Head. It is Stormzy and Ed Sheeran's second collaboration of 2019, following Sheeran's "Take Me Back to London". It reached number one on the UK Singles Chart in January 2020, becoming Stormzy's third UK number one, and second as a lead artist, as well as Sheeran's ninth. It was also the first number one of the 2020s.

== Background ==
A press release described "Own It" as "another supremely slick release" from Stormzy, writing that his "South London flow [is] aligned to a dancehall-tinged production, [...] with his word play empowering and uplifting a female love interest".

== Music video ==
The video was released on 22 November 2019, the same day as the song. It was directed by Nathan James Tettey and shot in various locations around London.

== Charts ==
=== Weekly charts ===
Weekly chart performance for "Own It"
| Chart (2019–2020) | Peak position |
|---|---|
| Australia (ARIA) | 40 |
| Austria (Ö3 Austria Top 40) | 57 |
| Belgium (Ultratip Bubbling Under Flanders) | 1 |
| Belgium (Ultratip Bubbling Under Wallonia) | 5 |
| Canada Hot 100 (Billboard) | 82 |
| Colombia (National-Report) | 85 |
| Czech Republic Airplay (ČNS IFPI) | 53 |
| Czech Republic Singles Digital (ČNS IFPI) | 66 |
| Denmark (Tracklisten) | 11 |
| Germany (GfK) | 75 |
| Hungary (Dance Top 40) | 26 |
| Hungary (Stream Top 40) | 35 |
| Ireland (IRMA) | 2 |
| Lithuania (AGATA) | 25 |
| Mexico Ingles Airplay (Billboard) | 24 |
| Netherlands (Dutch Top 40) | 33 |
| Netherlands (Single Top 100) | 25 |
| New Zealand Hot Singles (RMNZ) | 4 |
| Portugal (AFP) | 80 |
| Russia Airplay (TopHit) | 98 |
| Scottish Singles Sales (Official Charts) | 6 |
| Slovakia Airplay (ČNS IFPI) | 63 |
| Slovakia Singles Digital (ČNS IFPI) | 48 |
| Sweden (Sverigetopplistan) | 30 |
| Switzerland (Schweizer Hitparade) | 27 |
| UK Singles (Official Charts) | 1 |
| UK Hip Hop/R&B (Official Charts) | 1 |

=== Year-end charts ===
Year-end chart performance for "Own It"
| Chart (2020) | Position |
|---|---|
| Denmark (Tracklisten) | 50 |
| Ireland (IRMA) | 21 |
| Netherlands (Single Top 100) | 76 |
| Romania (Airplay 100) | 44 |
| UK Singles (OCC) | 9 |

== Certifications ==
Certifications for "Own It"
| Region | Certification | Certified units/sales |
|---|---|---|
| Australia (ARIA) | Gold | 35,000^{‡} |
| Brazil (Pro-Música Brasil) | Gold | 20,000^{‡} |
| Denmark (IFPI Danmark) | Platinum | 90,000^{‡} |
| New Zealand (RMNZ) | Platinum | 30,000^{‡} |
| Portugal (AFP) | Gold | 5,000^{‡} |
| United Kingdom (BPI) | 3× Platinum | 1,800,000^{‡} |
^{‡} Sales+streaming figures based on certification alone.

== Release history ==
Release history and formats for "Own It"
| Region | Date | Format | Label | Ref. |
|---|---|---|---|---|
| Various | 22 November 2019 | Digital download; streaming | #Merky; Atlantic | |
| Australia | 22 November 2019 | Contemporary hit radio | Atlantic; Warner | |
| United Kingdom | 22 November 2019 | Contemporary hit radio | #Merky; Atlantic | |
| United Kingdom | 22 November 2019 | Urban contemporary radio | #Merky; Atlantic | |
| Italy | 6 December 2019 | Contemporary hit radio | Warner | |
