= Stormzy =

British rapper (born 1993)

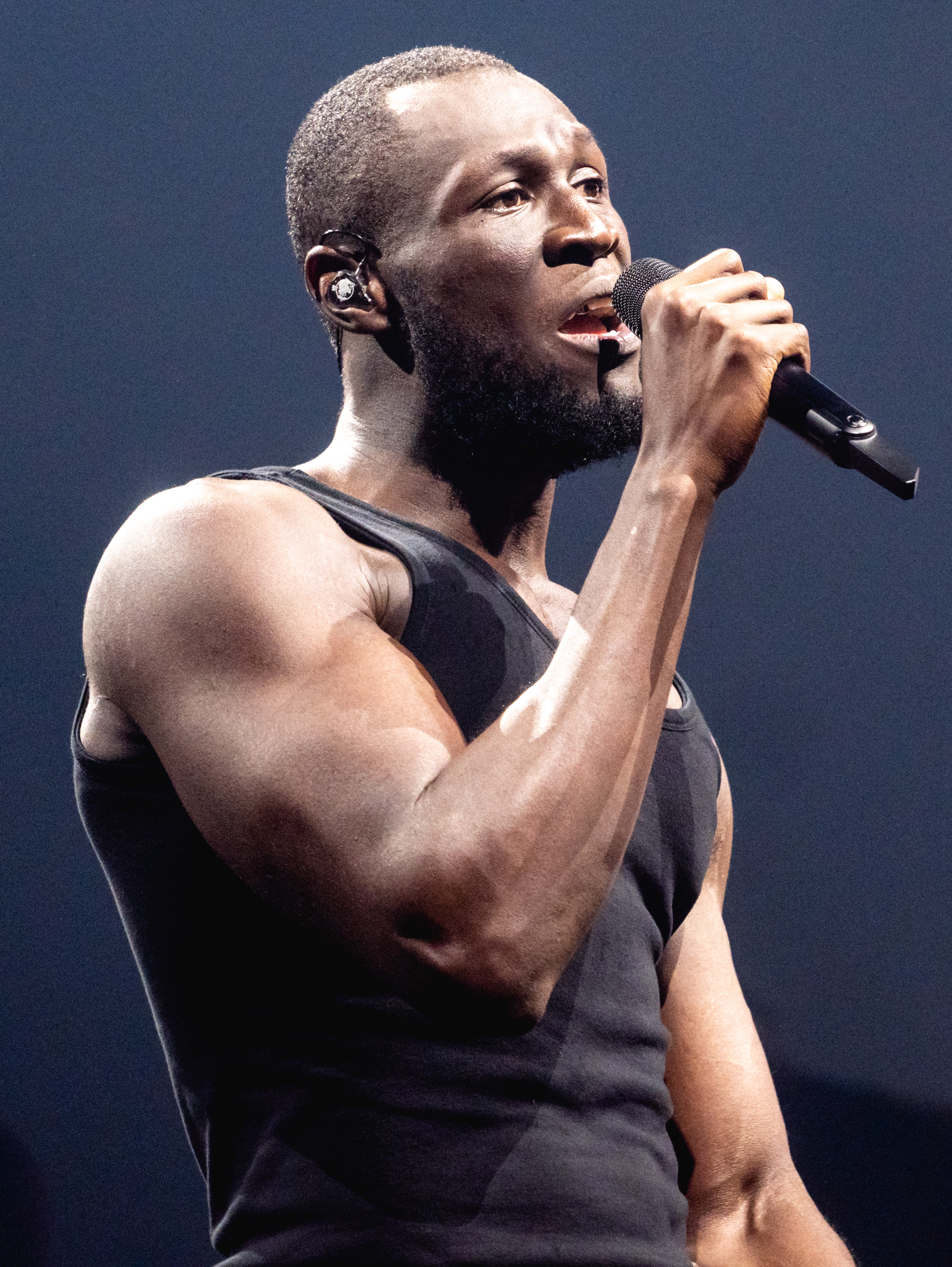
- Stormzy performing in 2022
- Born: Michael Ebenezer Kwadjo Omari Owuo Jr; 26 July 1993 (age 33); Thornton Heath, London, England
- Other names: Wicked Skengman; The Problem; Stiff Chocolate
- Occupations: Rapper; singer; songwriter
- Years active: 2010–present
- Works: Stormzy discography
- Partner: Maya Jama (2014–2019, 2023–2024)
- Awards: Full list
- Musical career
- Origin: Norbury, London, England
- Genres: British hip-hop; grime; R&B; gospel
- Labels: #Merky; 0207 Def Jam; Warner
- Website: stormzy.com

Michael Ebenezer Kwadjo Omari Owuo Jr (born 26 July 1993), known professionally as Stormzy, is a British rapper, singer and songwriter. In 2012, he gained attention on the UK underground music scene through his Wicked Skengman series of freestyles over classic grime beats. Stormzy's song "Shut Up", which was initially released as a freestyle on YouTube, became popular and peaked at number eight on the UK Singles Chart after he launched a campaign to reach Christmas number one.

Stormzy won Best Grime Act at the 2014 and 2015 MOBO Awards and was named as an artist to look out for in the BBC's Sound of 2015 list. His debut album, Gang Signs & Prayer (2017), was the first grime album to reach number one on the UK Albums Chart and won British Album of the Year at the 2018 Brit Awards. In 2019, Stormzy achieved his first UK number-one single with "Vossi Bop" and became the first British rapper to headline the Glastonbury Festival; where he wore a UK-stab vest designed by Banksy, in light of the rise in knife crime in London.

Stormzy's second album, Heavy Is the Head, was released on 13 December 2019. On 22 September 2022, he released the single "Mel Made Me Do It" accompanied by an 11-minute music video featuring popular artists, actors and sports figures such as Usain Bolt and José Mourinho. His third album, This Is What I Mean, was released on Def Jam on 25 November 2022.

== Early life ==
Michael Ebenezer Kwadjo Omari Owuo Jr was born on 26 July 1993 in Thornton Heath, a suburb of Croydon, South London. His mother is Ghanaian, his father was a taxi driver and he is a cousin of rapper Nadia Rose. He grew up in South Norwood, London, with his mother, brother, and two sisters. Stormzy did not come from a particularly musical household, although he liked music. He attended Stanley Technical School for Boys, South Norwood. He began rapping at the age of 11 and would clash with older rappers at his local youth club.

Stormzy has said about his school years: "I was a very naughty child, on the verge of getting expelled, but I wasn't a bad child; everything I did was for my own entertainment. But when I went into an exam I did really well." He said he got six A*s, three As, and five Bs on his GCSEs, but then only achieved a "humbling" ABCDE on his A Levels: "For someone who would cuss in class and was on the verge of being expelled, it was A Levels that showed me that in life you need work ethic." He studied for an apprenticeship in Leamington Spa, Warwickshire, and worked in quality assurance for two years at an oil refinery in Southampton, Hampshire.

== Music career ==
=== 2014–2017: Dreamers Disease, "Shut Up" and Gang Signs & Prayer ===
After garnering attention on the UK underground music scene via his Wicked Skengman series of freestyles over classic grime beats, Stormzy released his debut EP Dreamers Disease independently in July 2014. On 22 October 2014, Stormzy won Best Grime Act at the MOBO Awards. Later that month he became the first unsigned rapper to appear on Later... with Jools Holland, performing the song "Not That Deep" from Dreamers Disease. In November 2014, Stormzy collaborated with rapper Chip and Shalo on the track "I'm Fine", also appearing in a video for the song.

On 7 January 2015, Stormzy was number 3 in the "BBC Introducing top 5" on Radio 1. In March 2015 he released the single "Know Me From", which entered the UK Singles Chart at number 49. In September 2015, he released a final instalment to his "WickedSkengMan" freestyle series, "WickedSkengMan 4", onto iTunes, along with a studio version of his "Shut Up" freestyle over XTC's Functions on the Low instrumental. The track debuted at number 18 on the UK chart dated 24 September, becoming Stormzy's first top 40 hit and the first ever freestyle to reach the top 40 in the United Kingdom.

On 12 December 2015, Stormzy performed "Shut Up" during British heavyweight boxer Anthony Joshua's ring-walk for his fight versus Dillian Whyte. Originally, "Shut Up", released as part of the "WickedSkengMan 4" single EP in September 2015, charted at number 59. Since the performance, it began climbing up the iTunes chart and into the top 40. As a result, Stormzy launched a Christmas number 1 campaign to get the song to number 1. It generated a large amount of support, which made it enter the top 10 of the UK Singles Chart on 18 December 2015 at number 8, a week prior to the Christmas number-1 week, succeeding the chart position of "WickedSkengMan 4".

In April 2016, Stormzy released the non-album song "Scary" before he went into hiatus. After a year's hiatus from social media, Stormzy returned in early February 2017 via a series of billboard campaigns across London displaying the hashtag #GSAP 24.02. The album title was announced to be Gang Signs & Prayer. The album was released on 24 February 2017 and debuted at number one on the UK Albums Chart on 3 March 2017.

=== 2018–2021: Glastonbury and Heavy Is the Head ===
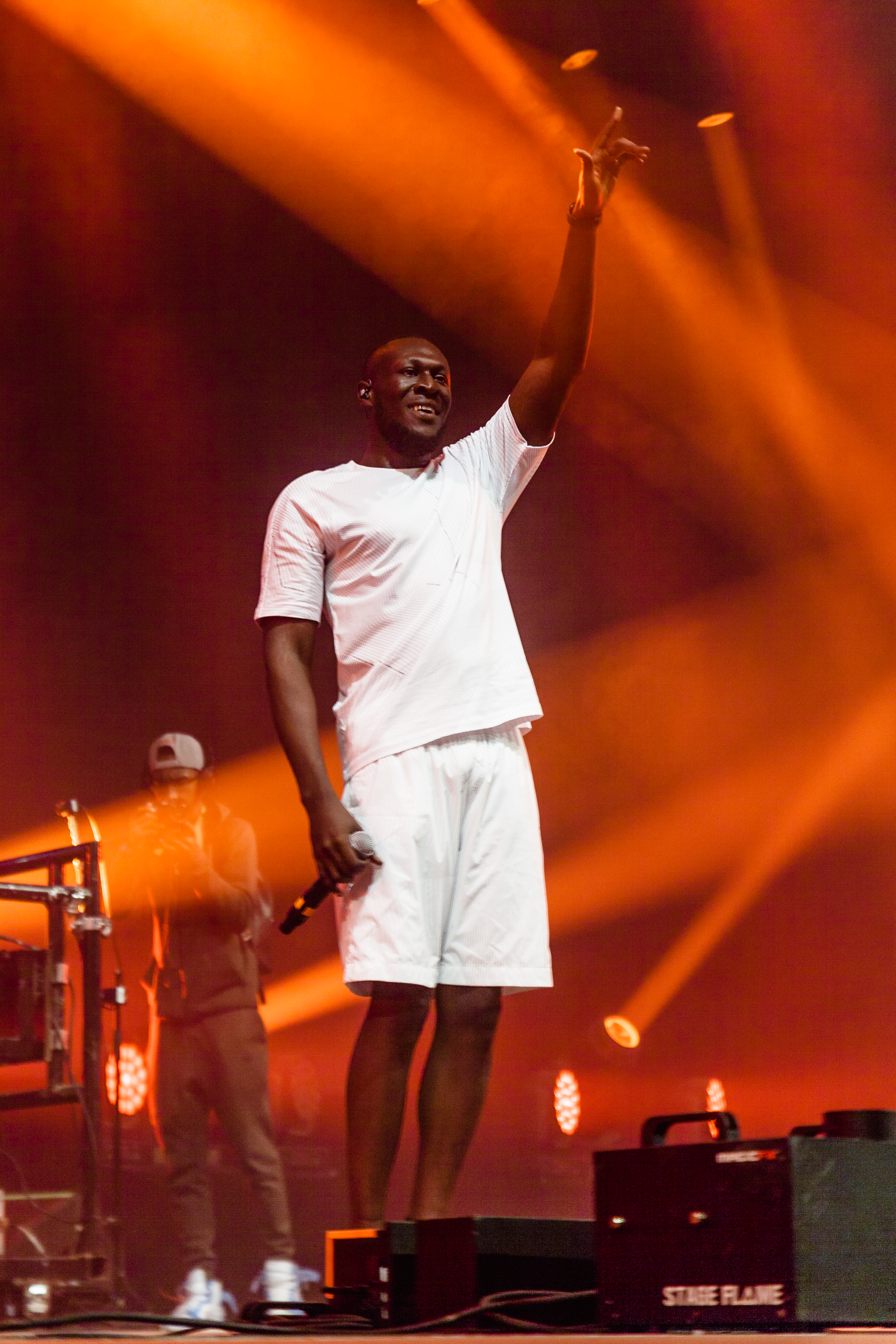
Stormzy on stage in 2018

Stormzy's headline appearance on the Pyramid Stage at the 2019 Glastonbury Festival was widely praised. His set made him the first black British rapper to headline the Glastonbury Festival. The performance featured a speech by the politician David Lammy that discussed the proportion of black and minority ethnic people in the British criminal justice system and, during "Vossi Bop", Stormzy encouraged the audience to join him in chanting "Fuck the Government and fuck Boris" - the latter a reference to former London Mayor Boris Johnson's Conservative Party leadership campaign. The show included guest appearances by dance group Black Ballet and pop singer Chris Martin. Stormzy wore a Union Jack stab vest designed by the artist Banksy, which was widely perceived as a comment on the rise in knife crime in London.

He has reached number one on the UK Singles Chart four times; firstly as part of "Artists for Grenfell" on 23 June 2017 with "Bridge Over Troubled Water", secondly with his own solo single "Vossi Bop", which debuted at number one upon its entry, ahead of "Me!" by Taylor Swift featuring Brendon Urie by some 500 combined sales, thirdly with his collaboration with Burna Boy and Ed Sheeran, "Own It" and fourthly with as a featured artist on the Ed Sheeran single "Take Me Back to London". Stormzy later released the singles "Crown", "Sounds of the Skeng" and "Wiley Flow", before announcing his second album, Heavy Is the Head, for release on 13 December 2019.

In the 2020 action-adventure game Watch Dogs: Legion, Stormzy appears as a fictionalized version of himself, offering a mission in which his character plays the track "Rainfall" from Heavy is the Head. The video for Rainfall appears in the mission, showing Stormzy's motion capture performance over locations, graphics, and the fictionalized future London setting of the game. Stormzy was recognised for both his contributions to music and his activism, landing him at number 5 in the Top 10 of the annual Powerlist in 2020, with an estimated net worth of £20 million in 2020. Heavy is the Head was shortlisted for the Mercury Prize 2020. This was the second nomination in his career. In the Powerlist 2021 he ranked as the third most influential Black Briton, for his advocacy against racial injustice and philanthropy, pledging £10 million to charities

=== 2022–present: This Is What I Mean ===
Stormzy released the single "Mel Made Me Do It" on 23 September 2022, his first solo single since 2020. Its music video included a variety of cameos from Usain Bolt and Louis Theroux, among others. He returned to social media on 12 October 2022 to announce his third album This Is What I Mean, which was recorded on Osea Island in England. It was released on 25 November 2022. The first single was titled "Hide & Seek" on 14 October 2022.

On 22 June 2023, Stormzy released the single "Toxic Trait" featuring Fredo. A month later, Stormzy and Raye released "The Weekend", having previously collaborated on the latter artist's 2016 track "Ambition".

== Style ==
Stormzy describes himself as "a child of grime"; he was influenced by the likes of Lethal Bizzle, Bruza, D Double E and Flirta D. However, he also cites R&B singers such as Frank Ocean and Lauryn Hill as influences on his sound.

== Political activism ==
In May 2016, Stormzy endorsed Labour Party leader Jeremy Corbyn. In an interview with the newspaper The Guardian, he spoke of his admiration for Corbyn's activism.

On 24 June 2017, Stormzy performed a chant of "Oh, Jeremy Corbyn" to the tune of The White Stripes' "Seven Nation Army" on the Other Stage at the Glastonbury Festival. He also performed a rap he had written for the victims of the Grenfell Tower fire, telling the festivalgoers to demand that the authorities "tell the... truth" and for the "Government to be held accountable". In September of that year, after being presented with the Solo Artist of the Year award by Corbyn at the GQ Men of the Year Awards, Stormzy called Prime Minister Theresa May a paigon, a Jamaican Patois word used to describe an untrustworthy person.

On 21 February 2018, Stormzy performed a freestyle at the Brit Awards, calling out May for her inaction in the aftermath of the Grenfell Tower fire the previous year. The following day, 10 Downing Street issued a statement defending the Prime Minister.

In November 2019, along with other musicians, Stormzy endorsed Corbyn in the 2019 UK general election with a call to end austerity. He also said "people-led change can be possible under a Jeremy Corbyn Labour government". He described the Labour leader as "the first man in a position of power who is committed to giving the power back to the people" and branded Boris Johnson "a sinister man". In the aftermath of the George Floyd protests, Stormzy issued a statement via his label, stating that he plans to donate £1 million a year for 10 years to charities, organisations and movements that are committed to fight racial inequality, justice reform and black empowerment in the United Kingdom. In an interview with the BBC, he said: "Black people have been playing on an uneven field for far too long and this pledge is a continuation in the fight to finally try and even it".

Stormzy has expressed support for the Palestinian cause. In October 2023, following the outbreak of the Gaza war, Stormzy posted a message on his Instagram account stating "Free Palestine". In the accompanying text, he wrote, "if there is ever a clear injustice in the world, no matter how big or small 100 times out of 100 I will be on the side of the oppressed. Unequivocally. As I always have been". He further demonstrated his support by performing at a benefit concert for causes in Palestine and Sudan in January 2024.

In February 2025, Stormzy faced significant backlash from supporters of Palestine for launching an advertising campaign with McDonald's. The fast-food chain had been the subject of a global boycott after its Israeli franchisee provided free meals to the Israeli military. Critics accused Stormzy of hypocrisy and compromising his beliefs, particularly after his earlier pro-Palestine Instagram post was no longer visible on his profile. In response, Stormzy denied that he had "compromised beliefs for commercial gain," stating that his stance on oppression and injustice had not changed and explaining that archiving the post was unrelated to the partnership.

== Personal life ==
Stormzy is a Christian. On the BBC's Christmas Day lineup in 2019, he read a passage from the Gospel of Luke.

Stormzy is a lifelong supporter of football club Manchester United.

Stormzy was in a relationship with British broadcaster Maya Jama from 2014 to 2019, and from August 2023 to July 2024.

== Scholarships ==
Stormzy has funded the "Stormzy Scholarship for Black UK Students" at the University of Cambridge, covering tuition costs for two students and maintenance grants for up to four years. He had previously approached the University of Oxford who "didn't want to get involved", according to him. In 2022, he was awarded an honorary doctorate from the University of Exeter for his work to promote education and fighting racial inequality.

In November 2022, Stormzy announced a partnership with Adidas and ten other brands, including football clubs Manchester United and Fulham, as well as Sky Sports and Goal.com, for a programme called "#Merky FC", set to launch in January 2023 and aiming to increase the representation of Black and mixed-Black British people in the football industry, by providing long-term, paid professional placements at the brands involved in the initiative. The programme was available to all UK-based, young people of Black heritage, aged 18 to 24.

== Publishing imprint ==
In July 2018, it was announced that the Penguin Random House division William Heinemann was to launch a new publishing imprint in partnership with Stormzy, called #Merky Books. The imprint was launched with the release of Stormzy's first book, Rise Up, in autumn 2018, followed by Taking Up Space: The Black Girl's Manifesto for Change by Chelsea Kwakye and Ore Ogunbiyi in summer 2019. That Reminds Me, a novel in verse by Derek Owusu, was released in November 2019. In October 2021, #Merky Books released Keisha the Sket, a viral serialised novel from the mid-2000s written by a Black London teenager in text-speak slang; the print publication includes both the original and a rewrite in standard English.

An annual #Merky Books New Writers' Prize is awarded to "young, underrepresented, and unpublished writers from across the UK and ROI", who are "telling the stories that are not being heard, and the stories that deserve to be read, across fiction, non-fiction or poetry." An inaugural winner of the prize, Hafsa Zayyan's We Are All Birds of Uganda was published in 2021 by #Merky Books, and was shortlisted for the 2022 Glass Bell Award.

== Discography ==
Studio albums

- Gang Signs & Prayer (2017)
- Heavy Is the Head (2019)
- This Is What I Mean (2022)

== Filmography ==
Film
Year	Title	Role	Notes	Ref.
2016	Brotherhood	Yardz	Credited as Michael "Stormzy" Omari	
2025	Big Man	Tenzman	Shot on iPhone, released via Apple	

Television
Year	Title	Role	Notes	Ref.
2017	Chewing Gum	Himself	Episode "WTF Happened?"	
2020	Noughts + Crosses	Kolawale	Season 1, Episode 6	

Video Games
Year	Title	Role	Notes	Ref.
2020	Watch Dogs: Legion	Himself		

== Tours ==
- Gang Signs & Prayers Tour (2017)
- Heavy Is the Head Tour (2020–2022)
