= Ill Blu =

British producer duo

iLL BLU
- Origin: London, England
- Genres: Electronic; UK funky; UK garage; afroswing; house; drill; hip hop; drum and bass; jungle
- Occupations: Record producers, songwriters, DJs
- Years active: 2008–present
- Labels: Island, RCA, Hyperdub, Numbers, Armada
- Members: James Grant; Darius Ellington
- Website: illblu.com

Ill Blu (stylized as iLL BLU) are a British record production duo, consisting of James Grant and Darius Ellington-Forde.

== Career ==
Ill Blu began their career in 2008 following the release of "Frontline" by Princess Nyah; at the time, the members of Ill Blu went under the names J-Reel and Def1, respectively. Following the release of "Frontline", the two would adopt the name Ill Blu; in an interview, they would note that "iLL" represented the rawness of their beats and "BLU" represented their cool approach to making them.

Following their well received remix of Shystie's 'Pull it' in 2009. iLL BLU quickly became sought after remixers and staples of the UK Funky House sound remixing for the likes of Roll Deep, Cheryl and Hot Chip, amongst many others.

They would go on to cement their underground foundations releasing the "Blu Magic Riddim" and EPs Bellion/Dragon Pop on Kode 9’s Hyperdub and Meltdown on Jackmaster’s Numbers record label, the latter of which was named one of Pitchfork's Top 100 Tracks of 2011.

In 2012, iLL BLU released an EP 'Illusions' on New York House DJ Kerri Chandler Label Madtech.

In 2014, Ill Blu signed to Island Records, releasing 2 EPs The Blu Magic Project & The Blu Oceans Project.

In 2018, iLL BLU signed to RCA. Their first single was "Chop My Money"; it featured Krept & Konan, Loski and ZieZie. The song was successful and was certified Silver by the BPI.

They also produced ZieZie's "Fine Girl", which was certified Platinum by the BPI, and MoStack's "What I Wanna", which was certified Gold that year.

Ill Blu spent a large part of 2019 behind the boards producing for artists such Headie One, Hardy Caprio, C. Tangana, Young T & Bugsey, Not3s & IAMDDB; they also produced Mostack's single "Shine Girl" featuring Stormzy & majority of his debut album Stacko, which peaked at number 3 on the UK Albums Chart.

In 2020, the duo released “Magic”, featuring OFB, Bandokay & Double Lz. Blending UK garage and drill, the track samples the motif from Sticky's “Triplets”. "Magic" was certified Silver by the BPI. Following the momentum of “Magic”, they released “Dumpa” featuring M24 & Unknown T, fusing the elements of Drill, UK Garage & Dancehall. The chorus borrows vocals from Vybz Kartel's “Dumpa Truck”.

Following the tragic murder of George Floyd at the police brutality in America, iLL BLU felt compelled to highlight the injustice black people faced when dealing with the police in the UK. In January 2021, Ill Blu released "Routine Check 2.0" featuring The Mitchell Brothers & Sneakbo alongside a documentary; the documentary gave several testimonies regarding racial profiling from black people, including Sneakbo.

On 2 April 2021, Ill Blu released The BLUPRiNT, their debut mixtape, which included features from Wretch 32, MoStack, Donaeo, Jillionaire, Geko, 169, Loick Essien & Aida Lae.

== Discography ==
=== Mixtapes ===
List of mixtapes, with selected details
Title	Details
The BLUPRiNT	Released: 2 April 2021; Label: RCA Records; Format: streaming, digital download

=== EPs ===
List of EPs, with selected details
Title	Details
Bellion/Dragon Pop	Released: 19 July 2010; Label: Hyperdub; Format: 12" vinyl, streaming, digital download
Meltdown	Released: 14 February 2011; Label: Numbers; Format: 12" vinyl, streaming, digital download
Clapper	Released: 14 May 2012; Label Hyperdub; Format: 12" vinyl, streaming, digital download
Illusions	Released: 22 October 2012; Label: Madtech; Format: streaming, digital download
The BLU Magic Project	Released: 30 May 2014; Label: Island Records; Format: streaming, digital download
The BLU Oceans Project	Released: 14 September 2014; Label: Island Records; Format: streaming, digital download

=== Singles ===
List of singles, with selected peak chart positions
Title	Year	Peak chart positions	Certifications	Album
Title	Year	UK	Certifications	Album
"Lonely People" (featuring James Morrison)	2015	—		Higher Than Here (Deluxe)
"Win or Lose" (featuring Ann Saunderson)	2016	—		Non-album singles
"So Deep"	2016	—		Non-album singles
"Antidote" (featuring Kahlia Bakosi)	2016	—		Non-album singles
"Tribalist (Get to Know)" (featuring Glowie)	2017	—		Non-album singles
"Chop My Money" (featuring Krept and Konan, Loski and ZieZie)	2018	64	BPI: Silver	The BLUPRINT
"Go Time" (featuring Ay Em, Geko, ZieZie and C.Tangana)	2019	—		The BLUPRINT
"Magic" (featuring OFB, Bandokay and Double Lz)	2020	46	BPI: Silver	The BLUPRINT
"Dumpa" (featuring M24 and Unknown T)	2020	70		The BLUPRINT
"Routine Check 2.0" (featuring The Mitchell Brothers and Sneakbo)	2021	—		The BLUPRINT
"Eyes On Me" (featuring Danny Byrd)	2023	—		Non-Album Singles
"—" denotes a recording that did not chart or was not released in that territory.

=== Guest appearances ===
List of guest appearances, showing song title, year released, other artists and album name
Title	Year	Artist(s)	Album
"Gods Work"	2020	IAMDDB	Non-album single
"Chocolate Darling"	2021	Poundz, Backroad Gee	No Smoke With Out Fire
"Sugar & Spice"	2024	Dizzee Rascal	Don't Take it Personal

=== Production credits ===
List of production credits, showing song title, year released, artists, certification and album name
Title	Year	Artist(s)	Peak chart positions			Certifications	Album
Title	Year	Artist(s)	UK	UK R&B	SPA	Certifications	Album
"Frontline"	2008	Princess Nyah	—	—	—		Diary of a Princess
"Big Boys"	2009	Princess Nyah	—	—	—		Diary of a Princess
"Stick Up"	2009	Dotstar	—	—	—		
"Hooligans"	2010	Princess Nyah, Ghetts, Griminal	—	—	—		Diary of a Princess
"Wave"	2011	Sneakbo	48	—	—	BPI: Silver	Non-album singles
"Zim Zimma"	2012	Sneakbo	35	—	—		Non-album singles
"Ring A Ling"	2013	Sneakbo	27	—	—		Non-album singles
"Ring A Ling" (Remix)	2013	Sneakbo, Wiley, Krept & Konan	—	—	—		Non-album singles
"Her Name"	2013	Sneakbo, L Marshall	—	—	—		Non-album singles
"Yolo"	2013	Jacob Banks	—	—	—		The Monologue
"Move Back"	2013	Stylo G	81	—	—		Non-album single
"Oceans 2"	2014	JP Cooper	—	—	—		Keep The Quiet Out
"Dr Who"	2014	Tujamo, Plastik Funk, Sneakbo	21	—	—		Non-album single
"Take Me Home"	2014	Nick Brewer, Ruby Maze	—	—	—		Warning Light
"Talk To Me"	2015	Nick Brewer, Bibi Bourelly	19	—	—	BPI: Silver	Non-album single
"Colour Trip"	2015	Iris Gold	—	—	—		Non-album single
"Right Now"	2016	Sneakbo, MoStack, J Spades	—	—	—		Non-album single
"Murder"	2016	MoStack, Moelogo	—	—	—		Gangsta Wid Banter
"Tool Cool"(Right Here)	2016	Sneakbo, Nyla,	—	—	—		Non-album single
"Too Cool" Remix	2016	Sneakbo, Nyla, Popcaan, Beenie Man	—	—	—		Non-album single
"Y"	2016	Geko, Afro B	—	—	—		Non-album single
"Liar Liar"	2016	MoStack	—	—	—	BPI: Silver	Non-album single
"Liar Liar" Remix	2016	MoStack, Krept & Konan, J Hus	—	—	—	BPI: Silver	Non-album single
‘Whats That (Its A Monsta)"	2016	Young T & Bugsey	—	—	—		Non-album single
"Let It Ring"	2017	MoStack	—	—	—	BPI: Silver	Non-album single
"Drunk On You"	2017	Geko	—	—	—		Lionheart
"Let Go"	2017	Geko	—	—	—		Lionheart
"You Aint Mine"	2017	Kyla, Popcaan	—	—	—		Non-album single
"Ussy Ussy"	2017	MoStack	—	—	—		High Street Kid
"I Like It"	2017	MoStack	—	—	—		High Street Kid
"Explore Ya"	2017	MoStack, Krept	—	—	—		High Street Kid
"What I Wanna"	2018	MoStack	31	—	—	BPI: Platinum	Stacko
"Fine Girl"	2018	Zie Zie	—	—	—	BPI: Platinum	Non-album singles
"Sensei"	2018	Zie Zie	—	—	—	BPI: Silver	Non-album singles
"Persian"	2018	Zie Zie	—	—	—		Non-album singles
"Litness"	2018	MoStack	74	—	—		Non-album singles
"Got"	2018	Not3s	—	—	—		Take Notes II
"Living Gravy"	2018	Young T & Bugsey, Not3s	—	—	—		Non-album single
"Shine Girl"	2019	MoStack, Stormzy	13	4	—	BPI: Silver	Stacko
"Stinkin Rich"	2019	MoStack, Dave, J Hus	19	9	—		Stacko
"Make Me Fall In Love"	2019	MoStack, Dolapo	—	—	—		Stacko
"Respect & Love"	2019	MoStack	—	33	—		Stacko
"Girl Diary"	2019	MoStack	—	39	—		Stacko
"Rock with You"	2019	MoStack	—	—	—		Stacko
"Take Em Down"	2019	MoStack	—	—	—		Stacko
"Home"	2019	Headie One	—	—	—		Music x Road
"Pronto Llegara"	2019	C. Tangana, Darell	—	—	41		Non-album single
"Rotate (Clockwise)"	2019	Rak-Su	—	—	—		Non-album single
"Sponsored"	2019	Hardy Caprio	70	—	—		Non-album single
"Cages 2 Stages"	2019	Tion Wayne	—	—	—		T Waynes World 3
"Famous"	2019	IAMDDB	—	—	—		Non-album singles
"Gods Work"	2020	IAMDDB	—	—	—		Non-album singles
"More Than Me"	2020	Young T and Bugsey	—	—	—		Plead The 5th
"Staqdo"	2020	MoStack	54	—	—		Non-album single
‘Signs"	2020	Aida Lae	—	—	—		Non-album single
"Chocolate Darling"	2021	Poundz, Backroad Gee	—	—	—		"No Smoke Without Fire"
"Dennis Rodman"	2021	Blanco	—	—	—		City of God
"Sugar & Spice"	2023	Dizzee Rascal	—	—	—		Don't Take It Personal
"—" denotes a recording that did not chart or was not released in that territory.

=== Remixes ===
Year	Title	Artist
2009	'Pull It'	Shystie
2009	"Trippin'"	Platnum
2009	"Battle Cry"	Shontelle
2009	"Gotta Have It"	MJ Cole
2009	"Watching Her Move"	Donaeo
2009	"Boxes & Locks"	Mpho
2010	"Good Times" (featuring Jodie Connor)	Roll Deep
2010	"Greenlight"	Roll Deep
2010	"Parachute"	Cheryl
2010	"I Feel Better"	Hot Chip
2010	"Standing In The Shadows"	Craig David
2010	"OMG"	Sabrina Washington
2010	"Woman World" (featuring Mz Brat & Sadia Ama)	Selah
2010	"Are You Gonna Bang"	Funky Dee
2012	"What Can You Do for Me"	Utah Saints
2014	"Bang Bang" (featuring Ariana Grande & Nicki Minaj)	Jessie J
2014	"Like I Can"	Sam Smith
2014	"Kisses For Breakfast" (featuring Popcaan)	Melissa Steel
2015	"Only Human"	Cheryl
2015	"Mami No Like"	Donaeo
2017	"One Way" (featuring Noah Cyrus)	One Bit
2017	"One Chance To Dance" (featuring Joe Jonas)	Naughty Boy
2017	"No Good For Me" (featuring Jeremih, Yungen & Not3s)	ADP
2018	Photographs (featuring Rag'n' Bone Man)	Professor Green
2018	"Baby" (featuring Kid Ink, Maleek Berry, RAY BLK)	Yogi
2018	"Tracksuit Love"(featuring Headie One)	Kenny Allstar
2018	"Will Smith" (featuring Not3s)	Geko
2019	"Simmer" (featuring Burna Boy)	Mahalia
2020	"Seen it All"	Everyone You Know
