= Geko (rapper) =

British rapper and singer from Manchester

- Born: Hodifa Abdalla Elshabli; 15 June 1997 (age 28)
- Genres: British hip hop; afroswing
- Occupations: Rapper; singer; songwriter
- Years active: 2010-present
- Labels: U.S.G. (2010-2014); OneTape (2015-present); 3 Beat; Sony Music

Hodifa Abdalla Elshabli (born 15 June 1997), known professionally as Geko, is a British rapper and singer from Manchester. He is best known for singles such as "6:30" (featuring NSG) and "New Money" (with French Montana and Ay Em) which charted on the UK Singles Chart and were certified by the BPI.

Geko was signed to K Koke's U.S.G. at the early age of 13. With them, he made the EP Heartless and several singles, leaving them in 2014 to start his own label, OneTape Records. He released the EP Baba and several singles under his own label and in 2017 released his debut album LionHeart with Sony Music. His breakthrough to the mainstream came in 2018, after signing to 3 Beat Productions, with a series of successful singles including "6:30", "Will Smith", "New Money" and "Link Up", all of which charted on the UK Singles Chart. In 2019 he released his first major album 22.

== Early life ==
Geko is of Libyan and Algerian heritage. He was excluded from school but still managed to finish seven GCSEs . As his early music influences he lists 50 Cent, Eminem, Jadakiss, Styles P and K Koke, which he thought of as his mentor.

== Career ==
=== 2010–2014, early career with USG ===
Geko began rapping at the age of 8; at 13, he signed to K Koke's UK music collective U.S.G., becoming their youngest member. Under USG, he released the single "Mommy" featuring Jay Soul, followed by the mixtape Voice Of The Future, the EP Heartless and a single "Crazy Life" (now only available via SoundCloud) which garnered him some underground following. He was the youngest rapper to record a session for Charlie Sloth's Fire in the Booth on BBC Radio 1. In 2014, at the age of 16, he left USG, a move which K Koke wasn't happy about, calling him a "snake" and an "ungrateful little shit".

=== 2015–2017, independent releases, Baba and LionHeart ===
After leaving USG, Geko started his own label, OneTape Records. In October 2015, he released the EP Baba, which he debuted at the O2 Academy Islington. Following that, in 2016 Geko released several singles to digital platforms independently, starting with "Y", featuring Afro B, the video of which was shot in Cova da Moura, Portugal. It was followed by "Make You Come", featuring Canadian singer RamRiddlz and "Khalas" featuring Ard Adz. In July, he performed in Wireless Festival.

On 10 March 2017, Geko released his debut album, LionHeart with Sony Music, although it was leaked earlier. It was led by the single "Drunk on You", released on 10 February. The album was described by Jon Caramanica of The New York Times as "sweet pop music with an international bent". After releasing the album, Geko went on a LionHeart Tour in England. He went on to release multiple singles to digital platforms, including "Bipolar" with Sneakbo, "Diamond" with Team Salute and "Ronaldo", in which he pays homage to Cristiano Ronaldo and compares Ronaldo's touch to his own. In June, he was featured on NSG's "Yo Darlin'" and he brought them up to perform it in Wireless Festival that July. The single would later be certified Silver by the BPI in 2019 and Gold in 2022. His last single for 2017 was "Lock The Door", which was described as "an afrobeats inspired groover, with hints of J Hus".

=== 2018–2019, mainstream breakthrough and 22 ===
Geko started 2018 with "Likes That", his first release with 3 Beat Productions. In April, he was featured with Afro B on Ay Em's "Come to Me". However, his breakthrough to the mainstream came in May 2018 with "6:30" (featuring NSG), his first single to make the UK Singles Chart, peaking at number 56, and later being certified silver in 2019 and gold in 2020 by the BPI.

In September 2018, he was signed by 3 Beat Productions for exclusive worldwide publishing of all his songs and future EPs and records, after already being signed to them earlier for records. The next single, "Will Smith" featuring Not3s, barely made the UK chart, peaking at number 100, but both "Will Smith" and "6:30" were featured in Capital XTRA's "Best Grime & UK Hip Hop Songs Of 2018".

The first single of 2019, "Don Daddy", with a video shot in Paris, did not make the UK chart but "New Money" that followed it, in collaboration with French Montana and Ay Em, made it to number 49, Geko's highest peak. To end 2019, Geko released two more collaborations, "Hey Mama", featuring Maleek Berry and Latifah, and "Link Up", with Stefflon Don, Deno and Dappy, which samples Ja Rule and Ashanti's "Always on Time", peaking at number 84 on the UK chart. Lastly, in December 2019, Geko released his first major album 22, including the six singles from "6:30" to "Link Up" and an additional seven tracks, including "Literally", featuring Mr Eazi. The album was described by GRM Daily's Jack Lynch as "mature and versatile". "Bad & Boujie", a single by AJ which featured Geko, Ard Adz and Koomz, and also charted in the UK chart, was nominated for the 17th Urban Music Awards in 2020.

=== 2020–present ===
After releasing 22, Geko announced he will go on The 22 Tour in 2020, however, this tour was rescheduled due to COVID-19. Geko released only two major singles in 2020, the afrobeat influenced "Tantrum"and "Ride Or Die", a collaboration with Paigey Cakey. He was also featured on several singles, including Jorday's "Closer Part II" and "Plan Tonight" by Nafe Smallz, but none of those singles charted. 2021 brought more singles including "Woi Oi", in collaboration with Ms Banks and BackRoad Gee, "Jeepers Creepers" with Taze, and "Drama", as well as being featured by other artists such as KD Blockmoney's "No Calling", but none of those singles have charted as well.

2022 saw little activity from Geko, with only two titles widely released, "Problems" in January, another collaboration with Ard Adz, and "Clio" in November with Shabizla.

== Personal life ==
Geko was a childhood friend of Salman Abedi, the assailant of the Manchester Arena bombing in May 2017. He said that when he heard about the bombing he wept. Referring to the bomber, he said "he's an idiot and he's dead". Later in 2017, he falsely announced on Twitter that he had cancer. Two years later he revealed that the tweet was made while on medication in a mental health unit.

In 2019, he modeled for Napapijri at Scotts Menswear.

== Discography ==
=== Studio albums ===
Title	Album details
LionHeart	Released: 10 March 2017; Label: Sony Music; Format: Digital download, streaming
22	Released: 6 December 2019; Label: 3 Beat Productions; Format: Digital download, streaming

=== Mixtapes ===
Title	Mixtapes details
Voice Of The Future	Released: December 2012; Label: USG Entertainment; Format: Digital download, streaming

=== Extended plays ===
Title	EP details
Heartless	Released: 16 September 2013; Label: USG Entertainment; Format: Digital download, streaming
Baba	Released: 28 October 2015; Label: Independent; Format: Digital download, streaming

=== Singles ===
==== As lead artist ====
List of singles, with year released, selected chart positions and certifications
Title	Year	Peak chart positions	Certifications	Album
Title	Year	UK	Certifications	Album
"Mommy" (featuring Jay Soul)	2012	—		Non-album single
"Y" (featuring Afro B)	2016	—		Non-album single
"Make You Come" (featuring Ramriddlz)	2016	—		Non-album single
"Khalas" (featuring Ard Adz)	2016	—		Non-album single
"Drunk on You"	2017	—		LionHeart
"Bipolar" (with Sneakbo)	2017	—		Non-album single
"Diamond" (with Team Salute)	2017	—		Non-album single
"Multi Task" (with Aystar and Safone)	2017	—		Scousematic 2
"Ronaldo"	2017	—		Non-album single
"Blac Chyna"	2017	—		Non-album single
"Lock the Door"	2017	—		Non-album single
"Likes That"	2018	—		Non-album single
"6:30" (featuring NSG)	2018	56	BPI: Gold	22
"Will Smith" (featuring Not3s)	2018	100		22
"Don Daddy"	2019	—		22
"New Money" (with French Montana and Ay Em)	2019	49		22
"Hey Mama" (featuring Maleek Berry and Latifah)	2019	—		22
"Link Up" (with Stefflon Don, Deno and Dappy)	2019	84		22
"Repeat" (Remix) (featuring Lotto Boyzz)	2020	—		Non-album singles
"Tantrum"	2020	—		Non-album singles
"Ride Or Die" (with Paigey Cakey)	2020	—		Non-album singles
"Woi Oi" (with Ms Banks and BackRoad Gee)	2021	—		Non-album singles
"Over & Under"	2021	—		Non-album singles
"Jeepers Creepers" (with Taze)	2021	—		Non-album singles
"Drama"	2021	—		Non-album singles
"Problems" (featuring Ard Adz)	2022	—		Non-album singles
"Clio" (with Shabizla)	2022	—		Non-album singles
"—" denotes a recording that did not chart or was not released in that territory.

==== As featured artist ====
List of singles, with year released, selected chart positions and certifications
Title	Year	Peak chart positions	Certifications	Album
Title	Year	UK	Certifications	Album
"In2" (Remix) (WSTRN featuring Wretch 32, Chip and Geko)	2015	—		In2 (Remixes)
"NaNa" (Paigey Cakey featuring Geko)	2015	—		Red
"Yo Darlin'" (NSG featuring Geko)	2017	—	BPI: Gold	Non-album singles
"Southside" (Cadet featuring Geko)	2017	—		Non-album singles
"Come To Me" (Ay Em featuring Afro B and Geko)	2018	—		Non-album singles
"No Make Up" (J-Sol featuring Geko)	2018	—		Non-album singles
"Again" Kida Kudz featuring Geko)	2018	—		Non-album singles
"Wondering" (Remix) (M.O featuring Geko and Ms Banks)	2019	—		Non-album singles
"Bally" (Remix) (Swarmz featuring Geko, Jaykae, Kwengface and 23 Unofficial)	2019	—		Non-album singles
"Go Time" (Ill Blu featuring Ay Em, Geko, ZieZie and C. Tangana)	2019	—		The BLUPRiNT
"Bad & Boujie" (AJ featuring Geko, Ard Adz and Koomz	2019	71		Non-album single
"Back It Up" (Ms Banks featuring Geko	2019	—		The Coldest Winter Ever, Pt. 2
"Likin" (Fastlane Wez featuring Geko and Yungen	2019	—		Non-album singles
"Confidence" (Yung Filly and Chunkz featuring Geko)	2020	—		Non-album singles
"Closer Part II" (Jorday featuring Geko)	2020	—		Non-album singles
"Plan Tonight" (Nafe Smallz featuring Geko)	2020	—		Non-album singles
"No Calling" (KD Blockmoney featuring Geko)	2021	—		Non-album singles
"—" denotes a recording that did not chart or was not released in that territory.

=== Other guest appearances ===
List of album guest appearances with other performing artists, showing year released and album name
Title	Year	Other artist(s)	Album
"Get Rich"	2014	Brotherhood	Love Life Hate the World
"Eko Miami"	2016	Maleek Berry	Last Daze of Summer
"Money & Blood"	2017	Safone	The Link Up
"Gone Bad"	2017	Tion Wayne, One Acen	Transition
"Cold"	2017	Clue	Free Smoke
"Stepped In"	2020	Big Tobz	Issa Vibe
