= Got Love =

Got Love may refer to:

- Got Love (EP), by Got 7, 2014
- "Got Love" (song), by WSTRN, 2015
- "Got Love", a song by the Front Line from Love Is the Song We Sing: San Francisco Nuggets 1965–1970, 2007
- "Got Love", a song by Terry Knight and the Pack from Terry Knight and the Pack, 1966
- "Got Love", a song by Tove Lo from Queen of the Clouds, 2014
