= Kiss My (Uh-Oh) =

2021 single by Anne-Marie and Little Mix

Single by Anne-Marie and Little Mix

from the album Therapy
- Released: 23 July 2021
- Genre: Calypso-pop; electropop
- Length: 2:57
- Label: Major Tom's; Asylum
- Songwriters: Anne-Marie Nicholson; Taylor Upsahl; Camille Purcell; Pete Nappi; Jacob Banfield
- Producers: Mojam; Pete Nappi

Anne-Marie singles chronology
"Our Song" (2021)	"Kiss My (Uh-Oh)" (2021)	"Everywhere" (2021)

Little Mix singles chronology
"Heartbreak Anthem" (2021)	"Kiss My (Uh-Oh)" (2021)	"Love (Sweet Love)" (2021)

Music video
- "Kiss My (Uh-Oh)" on YouTube

"Kiss My (Uh-Oh)" is a song by English singer-songwriter Anne-Marie and British girl group Little Mix. It was released by Asylum Records, as the fourth single from Anne-Marie's second studio-album Therapy (2021). It was written by Anne Marie, Taylor Upsahl, Camille Purcell, Pete Nappi, and John Banfield, with production by Nappi and Mojam. An electropop and calypso-pop song which samples Lumidee's song "Never Leave You (Uh Oooh, Uh Oooh)", the song lyrically discusses the liberation someone feels after walking away from a toxic relationship.

"Kiss My (Uh-Oh)" was met with mixed reviews from critics. On 26 August 2021, a remix of the song titled "Girl Power remix" was released featuring Becky Hill, Raye, and Stefflon Don. The remix helped the song reach a new peak of number ten in the UK, becoming Anne Marie's sixth and Little Mix's nineteenth top ten single in the UK. Kiss My (Uh-Oh) also reached the top ten in Latvia and the top fifteen of the Irish Singles Chart and reached the charts in seven other music markets.

== Composition ==
The song contains a sample of "Never Leave You (Uh Oooh, Uh Oooh)", a 2003 single by Lumidee. "Kiss My (Uh-Oh)" is a "playful" calypso-pop and electropop song written by Anne-Marie, Taylor Upsahl, Kamille, Peter Nappi, and Jacob Banfield, with the production handled by Nappi and Mojam. The song runs for a total length of two minutes and 57 seconds. Robin Murray of Clash compared the song to the works of Beyoncé. According to the sheet music published at Musicnotes.com by Universal Music Publishing Group, the song is written in the key of F minor with a tempo of 104 beats per minute.

== Critical reception ==
Robin Murray of Clash called the song a "blockbuster" and "a sly and subversive ode to the powers of womanhood". Michael Cragg of The Guardian referred to the song's sampling of "Never Leave You (Uh Oooh, Uh Oooh)" as "a lot of fun", but felt that Anne-Marie was "completely dominated by guests Little Mix and their not inconsiderable vocals".

It was featured as the commercial song in 2022 for BBC One series 4 of Glow Up.

== Music video ==
The music video for the song, directed by Hannah Lux Davis, was released the same day as the single. It was Little Mix's second music video to be directed by Davis, with the first being their 2017 single "Power". Inspired by the 2011 comedy film Bridesmaids, it features the group recreating select scenes from the film, as well as a scene with Anne-Marie and Jade Thirlwall in a club, while Perrie Edwards and Leigh-Anne Pinnock stay in a hotel room.

== Track listing ==
Digital download and streaming

1. "Kiss My (Uh-Oh)" – 2:57

Streaming – bonus tracks

1. "Kiss My (Uh-Oh)" – 2:57
2. "Our Song" – 2:43
3. "Beautiful" – 3:14

Digital download and streaming – Billen Ted remix

1. "Kiss My (Uh-Oh)" (Billen Ted remix) – 2:45

Digital download and streaming – Girl Power remix

1. "Kiss My (Uh-Oh)" (Girl Power remix) (featuring Becky Hill, Raye and Stefflon Don) - 4:36

== Credits and personnel ==
Credits adapted from Tidal.

- Anne-Marie – vocals, songwriting
- Little Mix – vocals
- Pete Nappi – songwriting, production, engineering, programming, guitar, keyboards
- Mojam – production, programming, sound effects, bass, drums, guitar, percussion, synthesizer
- Jacob Banfield – songwriting
- Kamille – songwriting
- Steven "Lenky" Marsden – songwriting
- Upsahl – songwriting
- Lewis Thompson – additional production, keyboards
- Cameron Poole – vocal production
- Raphaella – vocal production
- Stuart Hawkes – mastering
- Phil Tan – mixing
- Bill Zimmerman – assistant mixing
- Paul Norris – engineering

== Charts ==
Chart performance for "Kiss My (Uh-Oh)"
Chart (2021)	Peak position
Canadian Digital Songs (Billboard)	43
Croatia (HRT)	20
Euro Digital Songs (Billboard)	3
Global 200 (Billboard)	124
Hungary (Rádiós Top 40)	15
Ireland (IRMA)	13
Latvia (EHR Top 40)	10
Netherlands (Dutch Top 40 Tipparade)	16
Netherlands (Single Tip)	4
New Zealand Hot Singles (RMNZ)	10
Slovakia Airplay (ČNS IFPI)	88
UK Singles (OCC)	10

== Certifications ==
Certifications for "Kiss My (Uh‑Oh)"
Region	Certification	Certified units/sales
United Kingdom (BPI)	Platinum	600,000^{‡}
^{‡} Sales+streaming figures based on certification alone.

== Release history ==
Region	Date	Format(s)	Version	Label(s)	Ref.
Various	23 July 2021	Digital download; streaming	Original	Warner	
Italy	23 July 2021	Contemporary hit radio	Original	Warner	
United Kingdom	30 July 2021	Contemporary hit radio	Original	Warner	
Various	13 August 2021	Digital download; streaming	Billen Ted remix	Warner	
Various	20 August 2021	Digital download; streaming	Acoustic	Warner	
Various	26 August 2021	Digital download; streaming	Girl Power remix	Warner	
Various	2 September 2021	Digital download; streaming	Goodboys remix	Warner	
Various	10 September 2021	Digital download; streaming	PS1 Remix	Warner	
Russia	10 September 2021	Contemporary hit radio	Original	Asylum	
