= Don't Play =

2021 song by Anne-Marie, KSI and Digital Farm Animals

Single by Anne-Marie, KSI and Digital Farm Animals

from the album Therapy and All Over the Place
- Released: 15 January 2021
- Genre: UK garage; pop
- Length: 3:08
- Label: Asylum; Warner
- Songwriters: Anne-Marie Nicholson; Olajide Olatunji; Nicholas Gale; Mustafa Omer; James Murray; Andrew Murray; Sam Gumbley; Richard Boardman; Pablo Bowman
- Producers: Digital Farm Animals; Mojam

Anne-Marie singles chronology
"Problems" (2020)	"Don't Play" (2021)	"Way Too Long" (2021)

KSI singles chronology
"Really Love" (2020)	"Don't Play" (2021)	"Patience" (2021)

Digital Farm Animals singles chronology
"Home Sweet Home" (2020)	"Don't Play" (2021)	"Last Night" (2021)

Music video
- "Don't Play" on YouTube

"Don't Play" is a song by English musicians Anne-Marie, KSI, and Digital Farm Animals. It was written alongside Andrew Murray, S-X, Richard Boardman of the disbanded Delphic, Pablo Bowman, and Mojam, who produced it with Digital Farm Animals. The song was released for digital download and streaming by Asylum Records and Warner Music Group on 15 January 2021 as the lead single from Anne-Marie's second studio album, Therapy (2021) and the second single from KSI's second studio album, All Over the Place (2021). The music video was released on 15 January 2021.

"Don't Play" received positive reviews from music critics. The song debuted at number two on the UK Singles Chart and it has been certified platinum by the British Phonographic Industry (BPI) for exceeding sales of 600,000 units in the UK. The song additionally entered the music charts of Belgium, Croatia, the Czech Republic, Hungary, Ireland, Lithuania, the Netherlands, New Zealand, Romania, Sweden and the United States. "Don't Play" was nominated for the BRIT Award for Song of the Year at the 2022 ceremony.

== Writing and production ==
Speaking about collaborating with Anne-Marie, KSI said, "I was just gassed man. I heard the song and thought, 'Anne-Marie has absolutely made this a hit'. It was a good song but she made it insane. I was so gassed." Speaking about collaborating with KSI, Anne-Marie said, ""I am very open and honest and I try to be as down to earth as I can be all the time, but meeting JJ [KSI] opened my eyes even more. He is so real, it was very inspiring. He taught me to be myself and not to change myself for anyone. And his laugh is as crazy as mine. I was so happy about that." KSI and Anne-Marie confirmed shortly after the release of "Don't Play" that they had already started working on a second collaboration.

== Music and lyrics ==
Musically, "Don't Play" is a UK garage and pop track. Constructed in verse–chorus form, the song runs for 3 minutes and 8 seconds (3:08).

In the song, Anne-Marie and KSI deliver emotive lyrics about heartache. Anne-Marie pleads with KSI to not play with her heart, before KSI responds with his own emotive out-pouring of how much he misses her, how much she means to him and how she's blanking him. The song is structured in an almost conversational arrangement.

It is composed in a key of F-sharp minor with a tempo of 128 beats per minute.

== Release and promotion ==
On 4 January 2021, KSI shared a snippet of the instrumental to Twitter with the caption, "What female artist do you think would work well for this?" On 6 January 2021, he revealed via social media that the song is a collaboration with Anne-Marie and Digital Farm Animals, titled "Don't Play", and the song was made available for pre-order. "Don't Play" was released for digital download and streaming as a single on 15 January 2021 at 00:00 (UTC) by Asylum Records and Warner. The song was accompanied by the release of a lyric video to Anne-Marie's YouTube channel on the same day.

== Critical reception ==
"Don't Play" was met with positive reviews from music critics. Contact Music called "Don't Play" a "floor-filling banger" with "an infectious beat and some great vocal interplay between Anne-Marie and KSI". They found that Anne-Marie's "sweet harmonies contrast and compliment KSI's deeper, almost baritone delivery", and called the song "instantly likeable and radio friendly". GRM Daily's Courtney Wynter called Anne-Marie's vocals "delicate" and said that "KSI switches things up by delivering some affectionate lyrics with a more melodic approach than we’re used to". CelebMix's Katrina Rees said that the song "showcases Anne-Marie’s distinct vocals" and "KSI’s effortless flow", calling the song "uplifting" and a "low-key banger."

== Music video ==
The music video for "Don't Play" was directed by Troy Roscoe. The music video was filmed in London in mid-December 2020. The music video premiered on KSI's YouTube channel on 15 January 2021 at 10:00 (UTC).

The music video opens with Anne-Marie being bullied by a group of girls. In order to overcome the bullies and fight back, Anne-Marie is trained to fight by KSI. Anne-Marie becomes a fearless and take-no-prisoners fighter with a tough-girl mood, embodying the underdog narrative. The video pays homage to Anne-Marie’s background in Karate and KSI's participation in numerous boxing fights against other YouTubers. Anne-Marie revealed that she broke her finger during the music video shoot.

Four behind-the-scenes videos of the music video shoot have been released: the first video was released to Anne-Marie's YouTube channel on 16 January 2021; the second video was released to Digital Farm Animals' YouTube channel on 18 January 2021; the third video was released to KSI's YouTube channel on 19 January 2021, and the fourth video was released to Troy Roscoe's channel on 25 January 2021.

== Commercial performance ==
In the United Kingdom, "Don't Play" was the country's most downloaded song in its first week of release. It debuted at number two on the UK Singles Chart, making it the highest-placed new entry of that week, with first week sales of approximately 39,000 track-equivalent units. The song remained on the chart for a total of 27 weeks. On 24 September 2021, "Don't Play" was certified platinum by the British Phonographic Industry (BPI) for exceeding sales of 600,000 track-equivalent units in the UK.

In the Republic of Ireland, "Don't Play" debuted at number nine on the Irish Singles Chart, making it the highest-placed new entry of that week. It remained on the chart for a total of 23 weeks. In the United States, "Don't Play" debuted at number 12 on the Hot Dance/Electronic Songs chart. It was the country's 98th highest-selling dance track of 2021.

== Awards and nominations ==
Awards and nominations for "Don't Play"
Year	Award	Category	Result	Ref.
2022	BRIT Awards	Song of the Year	Nominated	

== Credits and personnel ==
Credits adapted from Tidal.

- Anne-Marie – songwriting, vocals
- KSI – songwriting, vocals
- Digital Farm Animals – bass, drums, keyboard, percussion, piano, production, songwriting, sound effects, strings, synthesizer
- Mojam – drums, keyboard, production, programming, songwriting, sound effects, synthesizer
- Andrew Murray – harp, live strings, songwriting
- Sam Gumbley – engineering, songwriting
- Richard Boardman – songwriting
- Pablo Bowman – songwriting
- Kevin Grainger – engineering, mastering, mixing
- Rob MacFarlane – engineering
- Cameron Gower Poole – engineering

== Charts ==
=== Weekly charts ===
Weekly chart performance for "Don't Play"
Chart (2021)	Peak position
Australia Digital Tracks (ARIA)	27
Belgium (Ultratip Bubbling Under Flanders)	14
Belgium (Ultratop Flanders Dance)	27
Belgium (Ultratop Wallonia Dance)	11
Croatia International Airplay (Top lista)	17
Czech Republic Airplay (ČNS IFPI)	47
Euro Digital Song Sales (Billboard)	4
Global 200 (Billboard)	150
Hungary (Single Top 40)	20
Ireland (IRMA)	9
Lithuania (AGATA)	99
Netherlands (Dutch Top 40 Tipparade)	20
Netherlands (Single Tip)	7
New Zealand Hot Singles (RMNZ)	4
Romania (Airplay 100)	59
Sweden Heatseeker (Sverigetopplistan)	18
UK Singles (OCC)	2
US Hot Dance/Electronic Songs (Billboard)	12

=== Year-end charts ===
Year-end chart performance for "Don't Play"
Chart (2021)	Position
UK Singles (OCC)	28
UK Streaming (OCC)	26
US Hot Dance/Electronic Songs (Billboard)	98

== Certifications ==
Certifications for "Don't Play"
Region	Certification	Certified units/sales
United Kingdom (BPI)	Platinum	600,000^{‡}
^{‡} Sales+streaming figures based on certification alone.

== Release history ==
Release dates and formats for "Don't Play"
Region	Date	Format(s)	Version	Label(s)	Ref.
Various	15 January 2021	Digital download; streaming	Original	Asylum; Warner	
United Kingdom	15 January 2021	Contemporary hit radio	Original	Asylum; Warner	
Various	11 February 2021	Digital download; streaming	Acoustic	Asylum; Warner	
Various	19 February 2021	Digital download; streaming	Franklin Remix	Asylum; Warner	
Various	25 February 2021	Digital download; streaming	Shane Codd Remix	Asylum; Warner	
Various	11 March 2021	Digital download; streaming	Nathan Dawe Remix	Asylum; Warner	

== See also ==
- List of UK top-ten singles in 2021
- List of UK Singles Downloads Chart number ones of the 2020s
- List of top 10 singles in 2021 (Ireland)
