= Got Love (song) =

Song by WSTRN
- Released: 2 December 2015
- Genre: British hip hop; R&B
- Length: 4:01
- Label: Atlantic; Warner
- Producer: Parallel

"Got Love" is a song by English R&B/rap trio WSTRN. It was produced by Parallel, a collective consisting of Angel and prgrshn. The song was released on 2 December 2015 for free download upon subscribing to their mailing list, and was also released via digital retailers on 4 December. An accompanying video was also released on 4 December, directed by Morgan Keyz, who shot the original video for "In2".

The group have expressed via Twitter that the song "isn't the next single". According to Clash Music, the song is about "appreciating the simple things in life".

== Track listing ==
Digital download – single
No.	Title	Length
1.	"Got Love"	4:01
