= Our Song (Anne-Marie and Niall Horan song) =

2021 song by Anne-Marie and Niall Horan

Single by Anne-Marie and Niall Horan

from the album Therapy
- Released: 21 May 2021
- Recorded: October 2020
- Genre: Pop
- Length: 2:43
- Label: Major Toms; Asylum; Warner
- Songwriters: Philip Plested; Anne-Marie Nicholson; Ben Kohn; Niall Horan; Peter Kelleher; Thomas Barnes
- Producer: TMS

Anne-Marie singles chronology
"Way Too Long" (2021)	"Our Song" (2021)	"Kiss My (Uh-Oh)" (2021)

Niall Horan singles chronology
"Moral of the Story" (2020)	"Our Song" (2021)	"Everywhere" (2021)

Music video
- "Our Song" on YouTube

"Our Song" is a song by English singer-songwriter Anne-Marie and Irish singer-songwriter Niall Horan. It was released on 21 May 2021 as the third single from the former's second studio album, Therapy (2021). Produced by TMS, "Our Song" was written by the two singers along with Philip Plested and the three members of TMS. The ballad's lyrics have the vocalists reminiscing about a past relationship.

In October 2020, Anne-Marie posted on Instagram that she was in a recording studio with Horan; the pair ended up writing three songs together. The song was announced on 13 May 2021, with the singers posting a 10-second clip on Twitter.

"Our Song" was a commercial success; it peaked at number 13 on the UK singles chart, becoming Anne-Marie's ninth top 20 entry and Horan's third. Elsewhere, it became a top ten hit on the Irish singles chart where it peaked at number 7.

== Music video ==
The music video for "Our Song" was directed by Michael Holyk and features the two singers as Bonnie and Clyde-type lovers as they escape from the police in a Jaguar XK120.

== Live performances ==
The pair performed "Our Song" for BBC Radio 1's Big Weekend, on The Jonathan Ross Show, and on The Tonight Show Starring Jimmy Fallon.

== Chart performance ==
On the UK Singles Chart, "Our Song" peaked at number 13, giving Anne-Marie her ninth and Horan his third top 20 hit. On the Irish Singles Chart, the song debuted at number 10 and latter peaked at number 7, giving Anne-Marie her fourth and Horan his sixth top-10 entry.

== Track listings ==
- Digital release
1. "Our Song" – 2:43
- Digital release – Luca Schreiner remix
1. "Our Song" (Luca Schreiner remix) – 2:44
- Digital release – acoustic version
1. "Our Song" (acoustic) – 2:55
- Digital release – Moka Nola remix
1. "Our Song" (Moka Nola remix) – 3:32
- Digital release – Just Kiddin remix
1. "Our Song" (Just Kiddin remix) – 3:32

== Charts ==
Chart performance for "Our Song"
Chart (2021)	Peak position
Australia (ARIA)	51
Belgium (Ultratop 50 Flanders)	50
Canada Digital Song Sales (Billboard)	28
Czech Republic Airplay (ČNS IFPI)	19
Canada CHR/Top 40 (Billboard)	49
Canada Hot AC (Billboard)	40
Euro Digital Song Sales (Billboard)	5
Global 200 (Billboard)	93
Hungary (Rádiós Top 40)	19
Hungary (Single Top 40)	16
Ireland (IRMA)	7
Mexico Airplay (Billboard)	25
Netherlands (Dutch Top 40)	32
Netherlands (Single Top 100)	96
New Zealand Hot Singles (RMNZ)	8
Slovakia Airplay (ČNS IFPI)	17
South Korea (Gaon)	194
Sweden Heatseeker (Sverigetopplistan)	6
UK Singles (Official Charts)	13
US Adult Pop Airplay (Billboard)	23

== Certifications ==
Certifications for "Our Song"
Region	Certification	Certified units/sales
Canada (Music Canada)	Platinum	80,000^{‡}
New Zealand (RMNZ)	Platinum	30,000^{‡}
United Kingdom (BPI)	Platinum	600,000^{‡}
^{‡} Sales+streaming figures based on certification alone.

== Release history ==
Region	Date	Format(s)	Version	Label(s)	Ref.
Various	21 May 2021	Digital download; streaming	Original	Warner Records	
United States	24 May 2021	Adult contemporary radio	Original	Warner Records	
Various	4 June 2021	Digital download; streaming	Luca Schreiner remix	Warner Records	
Various	18 June 2021	Digital download; streaming	Acoustic	Warner Records	
Various	18 June 2021	Digital download; streaming	Moka Nola remix	Warner Records	
United States	22 June 2021	Contemporary hit radio	Original	Warner Records	
Various	25 June 2021	Digital download; streaming	Just Kiddin remix	Warner Records	
