= MoStack =

British songwriter and singer

- Born: Montell Samuel Daley; 31 August 1994 (age 32); London, England
- Origin: Hornsey, London, England
- Genres: Hip hop; afroswing
- Occupations: Rapper; singer; songwriter
- Years active: 2008–present
- Labels: MizerMillion Entertainment; Virgin EMI

Montell Samuel Daley (born 31 August 1994), known professionally as MoStack, is a British rapper, singer and songwriter from Hornsey in north London. After releasing a string of online songs and non-album singles between 2014 and 2016, he released his debut mixtape, High Street Kid on 2 June 2017; which debuted at number 16 on the UK Albums Chart. His debut studio album, Stacko, was released on 7 June 2019; and debuted at number 3 on the UK Albums Chart. In addition to his own material, MoStack is also known for featuring on the hit singles "No Words" (by Dave) and "Fashion Week" (by Steel Banglez); which peaked at number 17 and number 7 in the UK respectively.

== Personal life ==
MoStack is autistic. He is a supporter of the football club Arsenal F.C.

== Discography ==
=== Studio albums ===
List of studio albums, with selected details
| Title | Details | Peak chart positions | Certifications |
| Title | Details | UK | Certifications |
|---|---|---|---|
| Stacko | Released: 7 June 2019; Label: MizerMillion Entertainment, Virgin EMI; Format: CD, streaming, digital download | 3 | BPI: Silver |

=== Mixtapes ===
List of mixtapes, with selected details and chart positions
| Title | Details | Peak chart positions |
| Title | Details | UK |
|---|---|---|
| High Street Kid | Released: 2 June 2017; Label: Self-released; Format: Digital download | 16 |
| High Street Kid 2 | Released: 24 September 2021; Label: MizerMillion Entertainment, Virgin EMI; Format: Digital download | 40 |

=== Singles ===
==== As lead artist ====
List of singles as lead artist, with selected chart positions, showing year released and album name
| Title | Year | Peak chart positions | | | Certifications | Album |
| Title | Year | UK | UK R&B | IRE | Certifications | Album |
|---|---|---|---|---|---|---|
| "So Paranoid" (featuring J Hus) | 2015 | — | — | — | | Non-album singles |
| "Murder" (featuring Moe Logo) | 2016 | — | — | — | | Non-album singles |
| "Liar Liar" | 2016 | — | — | — | BPI: Silver | Non-album singles |
| "Block Popping" | 2016 | — | — | — | | Non-album singles |
| "Let It Ring" | 2017 | — | — | — | BPI: Silver | Non-album singles |
| "Celebration" (with Not3s) | 2017 | — | — | — | | Non-album singles |
| "What I Wanna" | 2018 | 31 | 18 | — | BPI: Platinum | Stacko |
| "Litness" | 2018 | 74 | — | — | | Non-album singles |
| "Teach You Gangsta" | 2018 | 83 | 40 | — | | Non-album singles |
| "Daily Duppy" | 2019 | — | — | — | | Non-album singles |
| "Wild" | 2019 | 41 | 17 | — | | Stacko |
| "Shine Girl" (featuring Stormzy) | 2019 | 13 | 4 | 64 | BPI: Silver | Stacko |
| "Staqdó" | 2020 | 54 | — | — | | Non-album singles |
| "Loyal" | 2020 | — | — | — | | Non-album singles |
| "Miss Me" (featuring AJ Tracey) | 2020 | 39 | — | 67 | | Non-album singles |
| "Way Too Long" (with Nathan Dawe and Anne-Marie) | 2021 | 38 | — | 37 | BPI: Silver | Therapy |
| "Ride" | 2021 | 83 | 39 | — | | High Street Kid 2 |
| "Bronson" | 2021 | — | — | — | | High Street Kid 2 |
| "Fake Fake Fake" | 2022 | — | — | — | | Non-album singles |
| "Can't Forgive" | 2022 | — | — | — | | Non-album singles |
| "The Weekend" | 2023 | — | — | — | | Non-album singles |
| "Cap 2 da Side" | 2023 | — | — | — | | Non-album singles |
| "Who's Realer?" | 2024 | — | — | — | | Non-album singles |
| "Sleep On Me" | 2024 | — | — | — | | Non-album singles |
| "Not a Gold Digger" | 2024 | — | — | — | | Non-album singles |
"—" denotes a recording that did not chart or was not released in that territory.

==== As featured artist ====
List of singles as featured artist, with selected chart positions, showing year released and album name
| Title | Year | Peak chart positions | | Certifications | Album |
| Title | Year | UK | IRE | Certifications | Album |
|---|---|---|---|---|---|
| "All for the Team" (Tizzy featuring Mo Stack) | 2015 | — | — | | Non-album singles |
| "Right Now" (Sneakbo featuring Mostack & J Spades) | 2016 | — | — | | Non-album singles |
| "Black Man Down" (Sean Focus featuring Mostack) | 2016 | — | — | | Non-album singles |
| "Money" (Steel Banglez featuring Mostack, Mist, Haile & Abra Cadabra) | 2017 | — | — | | Non-album singles |
| "Social" (WSTRN featuring MoStack) | 2017 | — | — | | Non-album singles |
| "Boom" (Shakes featuring Fari & Mostack) | 2017 | — | — | | Non-album singles |
| "No Words" (Dave featuring MoStack) | 2017 | 17 | — | BPI: 2× Platinum | Game Over – EP |
| "Bad" (Steel Banglez featuring Yungen, MoStack, Mr Eazi & Not3s) | 2017 | 29 | — | BPI: Platinum | Non-album singles |
| "Shutdown" (Charmz featuring Shosho & Mostack) | 2018 | — | — | | Non-album singles |
| "Crepes and Cones (Ya Dun Know)" (Krept & Konan featuring Mostack) | 2018 | — | — | | Non-album singles |
| "Fashion Week" (Steel Banglez featuring AJ Tracey & MoStack) | 2019 | 7 | 69 | BPI: Platinum | Non-album singles |
| "Floss" (AJ Tracey featuring MoStack & Not3s) | 2019 | 22 | 50 | | AJ Tracey |
| "Dinner Guest" (AJ Tracey featuring MoStack) | 2020 | 5 | 13 | BPI: Platinum | Flu Game |
"—" denotes a recording that did not chart or was not released in that territory.

=== Other charted songs ===
List of other charted songs, with selected chart positions, showing year released and album name
| Title | Year | Peak chart positions | | | Certifications | Album |
| Title | Year | UK | UK R&B | IRE | Certifications | Album |
|---|---|---|---|---|---|---|
| "Fisherman" (with J Hus & Mist) | 2017 | 47 | — | — | BPI: Platinum | Common Sense |
| "Screw & Brew" | 2017 | 79 | — | — | BPI: Silver | High Street Kid |
| "99 + 1" (with Not3s) | 2017 | 82 | — | — | | Take Not3s |
| "Stinking Rich" (featuring Dave and J Hus) | 2019 | 19 | 9 | 74 | | Stacko |
| "I'm the One" (with Fredo) | 2019 | 39 | 21 | — | | Stacko |
| "Shannon" | 2019 | — | 24 | — | | Stacko |
| "Respect & Love" | 2019 | — | 33 | — | | Stacko |
| "Girl Diary" | 2019 | — | 39 | — | | Stacko |
| "Yes Yes" | 2019 | — | 40 | — | | Stacko |
| "Frankenstein" (featuring Mist) | 2021 | 76 | — | — | | High Street Kid 2 |
"—" denotes a recording that did not chart or was not released in that territory.

=== Guest appearances ===
List of non-single guest appearances, showing year released, other artists and album name
| Title | Year | Other artist(s) | Album |
|---|---|---|---|
| "Autogas" | 2015 | Tinie Tempah, Big Narstie | Junk Food |
| "A.F.T.T" | 2016 | Tizzy | Humble Beginnings – EP |
| "Ciao Bella" | 2016 | None | The Intent (Original Motion Picture Soundtrack) |
| "Shut Them Down" (Remix) | 2017 | Dun D, Timbo | Non-album remix |
| "Hold You" | 2017 | Lethal Bizzle | You'll Never Make a Million from Grime EP |
| "Fisherman" | 2017 | J Hus, Mist | Common Sense |
| "Mash Up" | 2017 | J Hus | Common Sense |
| "99 + 1" | 2017 | Not3s | Take Not3s |
| "Uber" | 2018 | Mist | Diamond in the Dirt |
| "Mosh Pit" | 2018 | Mist, Swifta Beater | Diamond in the Dirt |
| "Weekday" | 2019 | Aitch, Steel Banglez | AitcH2O |
| "Cheating On Wifey" | 2019 | Krept & Konan | Revenge Is Sweet |
| "Bang Boogie" | 2021 | iLL BLU | The BLUPRiNT |
| "Can't Style Me" | 2023 | Clavish | Rap Game Awful |

== Awards and nominations ==
| Year | Organization | Award | Nominated work | Result |
|---|---|---|---|---|
| 2016 | MOBO Awards | Best Newcomer | Himself | Nominated |
| 2017 | MOBO Awards | Best Male | Himself | Nominated |
