= ZieZie =

British rapper and singer from Croydon

- Born: Joy Ebamba-Ndabala; 3 June 1998 (age 28); London, England
- Origin: Croydon, London, England
- Genres: British hip hop; afroswing; trap
- Occupations: Rapper; singer; songwriter
- Years active: 2016–present
- Label: RCA

Joy Ebamba-Ndabala, known as ZieZie (born 3 June 1998), is a British rapper and singer from Croydon, London. He is best known for his single "Fine Girl", released in 2018, and for being featured in Aitch's "Buss Down" in 2019.

== Early life ==
ZieZie was born on 3 June 1998 to a Congolese family. He grew up in Chessington, later moving to Croydon, south London. At the age of 11, he was encouraged to join the school choir by his teachers, saying in an interview that it gave him the dream to be an actor or singer. His father died when he was 12. ZieZie started studying carpentry in college, but his mother had to leave to the Congo in order to care for his grandmother; this would result in him missing five months of college. As a result, he decided to drop out and focus on music.

== Career ==
ZieZie's career started with "Shawty", which he released on SoundCloud in December 2016. In 2017, after "Shawty" gained some underground interest and with the success of "Mingle" and "Hello", he was signed to RCA Records. Working with producers Ill Blu, his break into the charts came with "Fine Girl", which premiered on GRM Daily in April 2018 and entered the UK Singles Chart in May 2018. "Fine Girl" peaked at number 30 and was certified platinum by the British Phonographic Industry in 2020. The song was also featured on Ministry of Sound's Love Island – The Pool Party and Now That's What I Call Music! 101. After being featured on Ill Blu's "Chop My Money" with Krept & Konan and Loski, he released his second solo single "Sensei" in December 2018.

ZieZie started 2019 with being featured on Canadian duo Banx & Ranx's single "Speaker" with Olivia Holt and on Ill Blu's "Go Time", (with Ay Em, Geko and C. Tangana), followed by his own single "Persian" in June. In September, he was featured on Aitch's successful single "Buss Down", which peaked at number 8 on the UK Singles Chart and was certified platinum in 2021. In December, Aitch and ZieZie performed "Buss Down" in Capital FM's 2019 Jingle Bell Ball concert at The O2. The collaboration led to ZieZie joining Aitch's UK tour; later that year, ZieZie featured Aitch on the single "French Kisses" and he continued to support Aitch in 2020. In July 2020, ZieZie was listed in the "Official Top 20 Afrobeats artists of the past 12 months" at number 6. Later that year, he released the single "Worth It" featuring S1mba and Stylo G, produced by Ambezza, with another video premiering on GRM Daily. He then released "Pamela" with Wauve and Stonebwoy, which was featured on Wavue's EP Shade, "Pattern Up" with Nat Slater and "Late Night Text" featuring Ms Banks and Kwengface.

In February 2021, ZieZie released the single "Blessed", which peaked at number 5 on the UK Afrobeats Singles Chart, ZieZie's highest peak on that chart. This was followed by "Flow", featuring American rapper King Critical, in May and "Different" in June, the latter charting at number 10 on the UK Afrobeats. In November 2021 ZieZie supported Lil Tjay on his UK tour.

ZieZie's return to the UK Singles Chart after almost two years came with the single "Glad U Came" by producer Liilz featuring ZieZie, which samples The Wanted's "Glad You Came". The song entered the chart in March 2022 and peaked at number 15. This was followed by being featured in Banx & Ranx's surprising remix of Sigala's "Melody", released in the same month.

== Discography ==
=== Singles ===
==== As lead artist ====
List of singles, with year released, selected chart positions and certifications
Title	Year	Peak chart positions		Certifications	Album
Title	Year	UK	UK Afrobeats	Certifications	Album
"Mingle" (with AdeSTP)	2017	—	×		Non-album singles
"Hello" (with AdeSTP and Scratch)	2017	—	×		Non-album singles
"Low Life"	2017	—	×	BPI: Silver	Non-album singles
"Fine Girl"	2018	30	×	BPI: Platinum	Non-album singles
"Sensei"	2018	97	×	BPI: Silver	Non-album singles
"Persian"	2019	—	×		Non-album singles
"French Kisses" (featuring Aitch)	2019	35	×	BPI: Silver	Non-album singles
"Worth It" (featuring S1mba and Stylo G)	2020	—	—		
"Pamela" (with Wauve and Stonebwoy)	2020	—	12		Shade
"Pattern Up" (with Nat Slater)	2020	—	—		Non-album singles
"Late Night Text" (featuring Ms Banks and Kwengface)	2020	—	9		Non-album singles
"Blessed"	2021	—	5		Non-album singles
"Show Me (Montre Moi)" (with Ya Levis)	2021	—	—		Non-album singles
"Flow" (featuring King Critical)	2021	—	—		Non-album singles
"Different"	2021	—	10		Non-album singles
"Mine Too"	2022	—	—		Non-album singles
"—" denotes a recording that did not chart or was not released in that territory. "×" denotes that the chart did not exist at the time.

==== As featured artist ====
List of singles, with year released, selected chart positions and certifications
Title	Year	Peak chart positions	Certifications	Album
Title	Year	UK	Certifications	Album
"Chop My Money" (Ill Blu featuring Krept & Konan, Loski and ZieZie)	2018	64	BPI: Silver	The BLUPRiNT
"Roll With Me" (Bantu and Jonas Blue featuring Shungudzo and ZieZie)	2018	—		Non-album singles
"Speaker" (Banx & Ranx featuring Olivia Holt and ZieZie)	2019	—		Non-album singles
"Go Time" (Ill Blu featuring Ay Em, Geko, ZieZie and C. Tangana)	2019	—		The BLUPRiNT
"Buss Down" (Aitch featuring ZieZie)	2019	8	BPI: Platinum	AitcH2O
"I Wish" (Ayo Beatz Remix) (Joel Corry featuring SwitchOTR, Hardy Caprio, Ms Banks, ZieZie and Mabel)	2022	—		Non-album singles
"Radio" (Pink Panda featuring ZieZie)	2022	—		Non-album singles
"Glad U Came" (Liilz featuring ZieZie)	2022	15	BPI: Silver	Non-album singles
"Melody" (Banx & Ranx Remix) (Sigala and Banx & Ranx featuring ZieZie)	2022	—		Non-album singles
"—" denotes a recording that did not chart or was not released in that territory.

=== Other guest appearances ===
List of album guest appearances with other performing artists, showing year released and album name
Title	Year	Other artist(s)	Album
"On Me"	2022	Brandz	Street & Soul
