= What I Wanna =

Single by MoStack

from the album Stacko
- Released: 28 February 2018
- Length: 3:33
- Label: MizzerMillion Entertainment; Virgin EMI
- Songwriters: Montell Daley; Darius Forde; James Grant; Brenda Russell
- Producer: iLL BLU

MoStack singles chronology
| "Bad" (2017) | "What I Wanna" (2018) | "Shutdown" (2018) |

"What I Wanna" is a song by British rapper MoStack that appears on his debut studio album Stacko. It was released as a single through Virgin EMI on 28 February 2018, peaking at number 31 on the UK Singles Chart. The song was written by MoStack, Darius Forde, James Grant and Brenda Russell, and it was produced by iLL BLU.

In October 2025, the British Phonographic Industry certified the song platinum for equivalent sales of 600,000 units.

== Track listing ==
Digital download
| No. | Title | Length |
|---|---|---|
| 1. | "What I Wanna" | 3:33 |

== Charts ==
| Chart (2018) | Peak position |
|---|---|
| UK Hip Hop/R&B (OCC) | 18 |
| UK Singles (OCC) | 31 |

== Certifications ==
Certifications for What I Wanna
| Region | Certification | Certified units/sales |
|---|---|---|
| United Kingdom (BPI) | Platinum | 600,000^{‡} |
^{‡} Sales+streaming figures based on certification alone.
