= Therapy (Anne-Marie album) =

Studio album by Anne-Marie
- Released: 23 July 2021
- Studios: Strongroom (London); Fred's Shed; Milico; Pig Life (London); Metropolis (London); Pete's Studio; SuCasa (Los Angeles, California); Eastcote (London); The Pent House (London); Major Tom's (London); House Mouse (Stockholm, Sweden); Peepee Palace; RAL (London)
- Genre: Pop
- Length: 33:50
- Labels: Major Tom's; Atlantic; Asylum
- Producers: Digital Farm Animals; Mojam; TMS; Nathan Dawe; Grades; Sire Noah; Lostboy; Cameron Gower Poole; Oak; Jean-Marie; Rudimental; Elvira Anderfjärd; Blake Slatkin; Fred Ball

Anne-Marie chronology
Speak Your Mind (2018)	Therapy (2021)	Unhealthy (2023)

Singles from Therapy
- 1. "Don't Play" Released: 15 January 2021; 2. "Way Too Long" Released: 9 April 2021; 3. "Our Song" Released: 21 May 2021; 4. "Kiss My (Uh-Oh)" Released: 23 July 2021

Therapy is the second studio album by English singer-songwriter Anne-Marie. It was released on 23 July 2021 through Major Tom's, Asylum, and Atlantic Records. A pop record, the album was produced by TMS, who previously produced her debut studio album, Speak Your Mind (2018), alongside Digital Farm Animals, Mojam, Nathan Dawe, Grades, Sire Noah, Lostboye, Cameron Gower Poole, Oak, Jean-Marie, Rudimental, Elvira Anderfjärd, Blake Slatkin, and Fred Ball. Therapy features guest appearances from producers Digital Farm Animals, Nathan Dawe, and Rudimental, alongside KSI, Little Mix, Niall Horan (previously of One Direction), and MoStack. Raye also provided backing vocals on the opening track, "x2".

Therapy was supported by four singles. "Don't Play", featuring KSI and Digital Farm Animals, peaked at number 2 on the UK singles chart, Anne-Marie's highest-charting single as a lead artist as of 2025. It also peaked at number 9 on the Irish Singles Chart and was certified Platinum in the UK. The second single, "Way Too Long" featuring Nathan Dawe and MoStack, was peaked at number 37 in both the UK and Ireland and was certified Silver. The third single, "Our Song" (featuring Niall Horan), peaked at number 13 in the UK and number 7 in Ireland, and was certified Platinum in the UK. The fourth and final single, "Kiss My (Uh-Oh)", peaked at number 10 on the UK singles chart, where it certified Platinum.

Therapy was positively received by music critics, who praised the guest appearances and Anne-Marie's vocals, but criticized its lack of a unique sound and confusing direction. The album charted higher in the UK than its predecessor, Speak Your Mind, peaking at number 2 on the UK Albums Chart. It also charted at number 4 and number 2 in Ireland and Scotland, and at number 3 on Ultratop's Belgian Albums Chart in Flanders. The album would eventually be certified Gold by the British Phonographic Industry (BPI) for equivalent sales of 100,000 units in the country. To promote the album, Anne-Marie went on the Dysfunctional Tour, which featured artists such as Gracey, Billen Ted, and Mimi Webb. A deluxe edition would later be released, featuring the non-album singles "To Be Young" with Doja Cat and "Birthday", alongside a guest appearance from JJ Lin.

== Background ==
Planning for Anne-Marie's second studio album began in 2019; in an interview with Music Week in March of that year, she provided information on her upcoming second studio album, stating: "I love the studio. I was able to get in there and have some sort of therapy with my own brain for a week and that's going towards the next album". She further commented that "the first album was made up of so many songs that people had heard for years and that's amazing. But for me as a creative person, I'm writing something new all the time and all I want to do is put it out straight away. That wasn't the way it happened with [the debut] album so, for this next one, I'm hoping to be more active on writing and put something out straight away that's fresh and no one's heard before." During 2020, Anne-Marie released the standalone singles "Birthday", "Her", "To Be Young" (featuring American singer and rapper Doja Cat) and "Problems", with "Birthday" and "To Be Young" later appearing on the Japanese edition of Therapy.

== Composition ==
Therapy is a pop album that draws influence from trance, indie, electronic, trap, UK garage, and pop rock. The opener, "x2", begins as a soulful song before turning into a revenge track. Lead single "Don't Play" was described as a 2-step-influenced UK garage track about heartache. "Kiss My (Uh-Oh)", a collaboration with Little Mix, was described as a calypso-pop number that was compared to the works of Beyoncé. It samples "Never Leave You (Uh Oooh, Uh Oooh)" by Lumidee. "Who I Am" was described as a pop song with lyrics of defiance and self-acceptance. "Unlovable", a collaboration with Rudimental, is a "fist-pumping" dance track. "Beautiful" sees the singer detailing her own insecurities over what NME described as swaying percussion. The tracks "Tell Your Girlfriend" and "Better Not Together" both contain lyrics about turning heartbreak into self-confidence. The title track serves as the closer for the album, being a trop-pop number.

== Promotion ==
On 15 January 2021, Anne-Marie released the lead single of Therapy, "Don't Play", in collaboration with British YouTuber and rapper-singer KSI and English DJ and producer Digital Farm Animals. On 9 April 2021, the second single "Way Too Long" was released in collaboration with English producer Nathan Dawe and British rapper MoStack. On 21 May 2021, the third single "Our Song", a collaboration with Niall Horan, was released. On that date, Anne-Marie announced the title, cover art, and release date of Therapy. She later announced that she would embark on the Dysfunctional Tour in 2022, and Therapy: The Live Experience on 7 August 2021 in support of the album.

On 6 July 2021, via Twitter, Anne-Marie created a website that involved her fans/followers to figure out the track-listing for the album, with new ones appearing daily. On 7 July 2021, random followers were sent DMs of one of two snippets of a song along with parts of the title. The track was revealed to be "Kiss My (Uh-Oh)" with British girlband Little Mix on 8 July 2021. The song samples "Never Leave You (Uh Oooh, Uh Oooh)" by Lumidee. The track was announced as the album's fourth single on 9 July 2021 along with its release date being 23 July 2021. A snippet of the song was released on TikTok. The cover was revealed on Anne-Marie's social media on 21 July 2021. On the day of release the song was accompanied by a music video was directed by Hannah Lux Davis. The music video parodies the 2011 comedy film Bridesmaids.

=== Tour ===
Dysfunctional Tour
- Tour by Anne-Marie
- Location: UK & Ireland; Asia
- Associated album: Therapy
- Start date: 3 May 2022
- End date: 18 October 2022
- Legs: 2
- No. of shows: 11
- Supporting acts: Gracey; Billen Ted; Mimi Webb

Anne-Marie concert chronology
- Speak Your Mind Tour (2018/2019); Dysfunctional Tour (2022); The Unhealthy Club Tour (2023/2024)

On 28 May 2021, Anne-Marie announced the Dysfunctional Tour, scheduled to take place from 3 to 11 May 2022 across cities in United Kingdom and Ireland. Tickets were released to the general public on 4 June at 10 am BST, with the option of pre-sale tickets given to those who pre-ordered Therapy through the singer's official website. The pre-sale tickets were available from 2 to 4 June (for the London and Leeds shows only). North American dates were announced on 30 November 2021. European shows were announced on 7 June 2022, while the Asian leg of the tour was announced on 15 July 2022.

In September, venues announced that both European and North American legs of tour were cancelled due to the singer's scheduling conflict, however Anne-Marie did not issue an official statement. The tour ultimately ran for 2 legs and 11 shows, with Gracey, Billen Ted, and Mimi Webb appearing as supporting acts during the UK & Ireland leg.

== Critical reception ==
Professional ratings
Aggregate scores
Source	Rating
Metacritic	65/100
Review scores
Source	Rating
The Arts Desk	2/5 stars
Clash	7/10
The Daily Telegraph	3/5 stars
The Guardian	2/5 stars
The Irish Times	3/5 stars
NME	4/5 stars
MusicOMH	4/5 stars
Pitchfork	5.4/10
Riff Magazine	6/10
Spectrum Culture	2.5/5 stars

According to the review aggregator Metacritic, Therapy received "generally favorable reviews" based on a weighted average score of 65 out of 100 from six critic scores.

Ali Shutler of NME compared it favourably to her debut album, writing that while her previous effort "spent too much time playing it safe", "its follow-up Therapy doesn't make the same mistake". Referring to the record as "infinitely more confident" sonically, Shutler gave the album four out of five stars. Robin Murray, writing for Clash, was similarly favourable, noting that the album "pushes her story to its next chapter, and while it features some surging highs, it doesn't quite dispel notions that Anne-Marie has yet to nail down a singular sound she can call her own". Ben Devlin of MusicOMH wrote: "Her newest record is packed to the brim with famous faces on vocals, songwriting and production, but her relatable, unpretentious, sometimes playful delivery holds disparate sounds and moods together with ease."

Lauren Murphy, writing for The Irish Times was slightly more mixed, criticising songs such as "Beautiful" and "Better Not Together", but states "the majority [of the tracks] land with a thud rather than a glance here". Dani Blum of Pitchfork dubbed the album "crisply rendered [and] competently hooky", noting that it "promises a more personal self-portrait, but [the British singer] ends up disappearing into vague songwriting and anodyne dance-pop production." Michael Cragg of The Guardian was more negative, referring to the album as a "missed opportunity", criticising the amount of collaborators on the album for overshadowing the singer, while preferring the "moments when Anne-Marie's brand of plain-spoken yet vulnerable pop shines through". He ultimately rated the album two out of five stars.

== Commercial performance ==
=== Anglosphere ===
In its first charting week, Therapy opened at number two on the UK Albums Chart with sales of 18,260, of which 12,463 were physical copies. By the end of 2021, the album was positioned at number 98 on the chart. The album would eventually be certified Gold by the British Phonographic Industry (BPI) for equivalent sales of 100,000 units. In Australia, the album charted at number 60 on the ARIA Charts. In New Zealand, the album charted at number 36 on the New Zealand Albums Chart.

=== Europe ===
In Austria, the album charted at number 15 on the Ö3 Austria Top 40 chart. In Belgium, the album charted at number 50 on the Ultratop chart in Wallonia and number 3 on the same chart in Flanders. In the Netherlands, the album charted at number 19 on the Dutch Album Top 100 chart. In France, the album charted at number 135 on the French Albums Chart. In Germany, the album charted at number 22 on the Offizielle Deutsche Charts. In Hungary, the album charted at number 5 on the Hungarian Albums Chart. In Ireland, the album charted at number 4 on the Irish Albums Chart. In Lithuania, the album charted at number 54 on the Lithuanian Albums chart. In Slovakia, the album charted at number 78 on the Slovak Albums Chart. In Spain, the album charted at number 76 on the Spanish Albums Chart. In Switzerland, the album charted at number 36 on the Schweizer Hitparade chart.

=== Other countries ===
In Japan, the album charted at number 178 on the Japanese Albums Chart and number 66 on the Billboard Japan Hot Albums chart. In Scotland, the album charted at number 2 on the Scottish Albums Chart.

== Track listing ==
Standard edition
No.	Title	Writer(s)	Producer(s)	Length
1.	"x2"	Anne-Marie Nicholson; Rachel Keen; Fred Ball; Peter Rycroft	Ball; Lostboy; Mojam^{[a]}; Cameron Gower Poole^{[v]}	2:46
2.	"Don't Play" (with KSI and Digital Farm Animals)	Nicholson; Olajide Olatunji; Nicholas Gale; Samuel Gumbley; Richard Boardman; Pablo Bowman; Mustafa Omer; Andrew Murray; James Murray	Digital Farm Animals; Mojam	3:09
3.	"Kiss My (Uh-Oh)" (with Little Mix)	Nicholson; Taylor Upsahl; Camille Purcell; Pete Nappi; Jacob Banfield	Mojam; Nappi; Poole^{[v]}; Raphaella^{[v]}; Lewis Thompson^{[a]}	2:57
4.	"Who I Am"	Nicholson; Warren Felder; Sean Douglas; Alex Niceforo; Keith Sorrells	Oak; Alex Nice^{[c]}; Sorrells^{[c]}; Poole^{[v]}	2:32
5.	"Our Song" (with Niall Horan)	Nicholson; Horan; Thomas Barnes; Peter Kelleher; Benjamin Kohn; Philip Plested	TMS^{[m]}; Poole^{[v]}	2:44
6.	"Way Too Long" (with Nathan Dawe and MoStack)	Nicholson; Dawe; Montell Daley; Tre Jean-Marie; Daniel Traynor; Uzoechi Emenike; Oladayo Olatunji; Michael Orabiyi; Ryan Campbell	Dawe; Jean-Marie; Grades; Sire Noah; Poole^{[v]}	2:30
7.	"Breathing"	Nicholson; Keen; Ball	Ball; Poole^{[v]}	3:24
8.	"Unlovable" (featuring Rudimental)	Nicholson; Purcell; Emenike; Dawe; Jean-Marie	Jean-Marie; Rudimental; Mojam^{[a]}; Poole^{[v]}	2:23
9.	"Beautiful"	Ed Sheeran; Max Martin; Elvira Anderfjärd	Anderfjärd; Poole^{[v]}	3:15
10.	"Tell Your Girlfriend"	Nicholson; Brittany Amaradio; Blake Slatkin	Slatkin; Poole^{[v]}	2:15
11.	"Better Not Together"	Nicholson; Purcell; Emenike; Jean-Marie; Dawe	Mojam; Popscar^{[a]}; Poole^{[v]}	3:09
12.	"Therapy"	Nicholson; Barnes; Kelleher; Kohn; Plested	TMS^{[m]}; Aod^{[a]}	2:46
Total length:				33:50

Japanese edition bonus tracks
No.	Title	Writer(s)	Producer(s)	Length
13.	"Birthday"	Nicholson; Amaradio; Felder; Sorrells	Oak; Nice^{[c]}; Sorrells^{[c]}	3:01
14.	"To Be Young" (featuring Doja Cat)	Nicholson; Amala Dlamini; Louis Bell; Teo Halm; Amaradio	Bell; Halm	3:24
15.	"Don't Play" (with KSI and Digital Farm Animals) (Nathan Dawe Remix)	Nicholson; Olajide Olatunji; Gale; Gumbley; Boardman; Bowman; Omer; A. Murray; J. Murray	Digital Farm Animals; Mojam	3:18
16.	"Bedroom" (JJ Lin featuring Anne-Marie)	Nicholson; Barnes; Kelleher; Purcell; Kohn	TMS; Chris Bishop^{[v]}	3:24
Total length:				46:57

=== Notes ===
- "Kiss My (Uh-Oh)" samples "Never Leave You (Uh Oooh, Uh Oooh)", written by Lumidee Cedeño, Teddy Mendez, Edwin Perez, Steven "Lenky" Marsden, Steven Marsden, Trevor Smith, and John Jackson, as performed by Lumidee.
- ^{^[m]} indicates a main and vocal producer
- ^{^[a]} indicates an additional producer
- ^{^[c]} indicates a co-producer
- ^{^[v]} indicates a vocal producer

== Credits and personnel ==
Credits were adapted from Tidal and the liner notes.

=== Recording locations ===
- Strongroom Studio; London (tracks 1, 6, 7, 11)
- Fred's Shed (1, 7)
- Milico Studios (KSI vocal: 2)
- Pig Life Studios; London (2)
- Metropolis Studios; London (3, 6)
- Pete's Studio (3)
- SuCasa Recording; Los Angeles, California (4)
- Eastcote Studios; London (5, 12)
- The Pent House; London (8, 11)
- Major Tom's; London (8)
- House Mouse Studios; Stockholm, Sweden (9)
- Peepee Palace (10)
- RAL Studios; London (10)

=== Musicians ===
- Anne-Marie – vocals (all tracks), backing vocals (1)
- Raye – backing vocals (1)
- James Murray – bass synthesizer, drums, percussion, sound effects (1); programming (8, 11)
- Mustafa Omer – bass synthesizer, drums, percussion, sound effects (1); programming (8, 11)
- Lostboy – drum programming, synthesizer programming (1)
- Fred Ball – keyboards, percussion (1, 7)
- Andrew Murray – keyboards, strings programming (1); harp, live strings (2, 15); programming (11)
- Digital Farm Animals – bass, drums, keyboards, percussion, piano, programming, sound effects, strings, synthesizer (2, 15)
- Mojam – drums, sound effects, synthesizer (2, 3, 15); keyboards, programming (2, 15); bass, guitar, percussion (3)
- KSI – vocals (2, 15)
- Pete Nappi – guitar, keyboards (3)
- Lewis Thompson – keyboards (3)
- Little Mix – vocals (3)
- Keith Ten4 Sorrells – drum programming, gang vocals, programming (4)
- Oak Felder – drum programming, gang vocals, keyboards, programming (4, 14)
- Alex Nice – gang vocals, keyboards, programming (4)
- Ben Kohn – bass (5, 12), piano (16)
- Tom Barnes – drums (5, 12)
- Pete Kelleher – keyboards (5, 12), bass (16)
- Niall Horan – guitar, vocals (5)
- Vern Asbury – guitar (5)
- Dyo – backing vocals (6)
- Grades – bass, drums, piano, programming, strings, synthesizer (6)
- Sire Noah – bass, drums, piano, programming, strings, synthesizer (6)
- Tre Jean-Marie – bass, drums, piano, synthesizer (6, 8); programming (6, 8, 11), strings (6), keyboards (8), vocoder (11)
- Nathan Dawe – programming (6), remixer (15)
- MoStack – vocals (6)
- Amy Langley – cello (7)
- Rudimental – vocals (8)
  - Amir Amor – drums, keyboards, programming (8)
  - Leon Rolle – drums, keyboards (8)
  - Piers Aggett – drums, synthesizer (8)
  - Kesi Dryden – drums, keyboards (8)
- Mark Crown – trumpet (8)
- Claire Hack – backing vocals (9)
- Jenny Addis – backing vocals (9)
- Nicola Lambrianos – backing vocals (9)
- Sebastian Hack – backing vocals (9)
- Siena Hack – backing vocals (9)
- Sue Nicholson – backing vocals (9)
- Wayne Nicholson – backing vocals (9)
- Elvira Anderfjärd – bass, drums, keyboards, programming (9)
- Blake Slatkin – bass, drums, keyboards, programming (10)
- Aod – guitar (12)
- Cameron Gower Poole – additional programming (12)
- Chris Bishop – additional programming (12)
- Teo Halm – bass, drums, piano, programming, synthesizer (14)
- Louis Bell – drums, keyboards, piano, programming, strings (14)
- JJ Lin – lead vocals (16)

=== Technical ===
- Stuart Hawkes – masterer (1, 3–5, 7–14)
- Kevin Grainger – masterer, mixer (2, 6); engineer (2)
- Geoff Swan – mixer (1, 7, 8, 10–12)
- Phil Tan – mixer (3)
- Charlie Holmes – mixer (4)
- Mark "Spike" Stent – mixer (5, 13)
- Serban Ghenea – mixer (9)
- Manny Marroquin – mixer (14)
- Chris Galland – mix engineer (14)
- James F. Reynolds – mixing engineer (16)
- Fred Ball – engineer (1, 7)
- Lostboy – engineer (1)
- Paul Norris – engineer (3)
- Pete Nappi – engineer (3)
- TMS – engineer, vocal recording engineer (5, 12), vocal engineer (16)
- James Murray – engineer (8, 11)
- Mustafa Omer – engineer (8, 11)
- John Hanes – engineer (9)
- Keith Ten4 Sorrells – engineer (1)
- Cameron Gower Poole – vocal engineer (2, 15, 16), additional vocal recording engineer (5)
- S-X – vocal engineer (2, 15)
- Rob Macfarlane – vocal recording engineer (2, 15)
- Tom Hough – vocal engineer, additional vocal recording engineer (6)
- JJ Lin – vocal engineer (16)
- Joe Burgess – assistant mixer (1, 7, 8, 10, 11)
- Niko Battistini – assistant mixer (1, 7, 8, 10, 11)
- Bill Zimmerman – assistant mixer (3)
- Matt Wolach – assistant mixer (5, 13)
- Dave Emery – assistant mixer (13)
- Jeremie Inhaber – assistant mix engineer (14)
- Robin Florent – assistant mix engineer (14)
- Scott Desmarais – assistant mix engineer (14)
- Ari Starace – additional vocal recording engineer (14)

=== Artwork ===
- Bella Howard - photography
- Kate Moross - creative director
- Studio Moross - design
- Phoebe Lettice Thompson - styling
- Jessica Griffiths - hair stylist
- Mona Leanne - make-up artist
- Emily Gilmour - nail design

== Charts ==
=== Weekly charts ===
Weekly chart performance for Therapy
Chart (2021)	Peak position
Australian Albums (ARIA)	60
Austrian Albums (Ö3 Austria)	15
Belgian Albums (Ultratop Flanders)	3
Belgian Albums (Ultratop Wallonia)	50
Dutch Albums (Album Top 100)	19
French Albums (SNEP)	135
German Albums (Offizielle Top 100)	22
Hungarian Albums (MAHASZ)	5
Irish Albums (Official Charts)	4
Japan Hot Albums (Billboard Japan)	66
Japanese Albums (Oricon)	178
Lithuanian Albums (AGATA)	54
New Zealand Albums (RMNZ)	36
Scottish Albums (Official Charts)	2
Slovak Albums (ČNS IFPI)	78
Spanish Albums (Promusicae)	76
Swiss Albums (Schweizer Hitparade)	36
UK Albums (Official Charts)	2

=== Year-end charts ===
Year-end chart performance for Therapy
Chart (2021)	Position
UK Albums (OCC)	98

== Certifications ==
Region	Certification	Certified units/sales
United Kingdom (BPI)	Gold	100,000^{‡}
^{‡} Sales+streaming figures based on certification alone.

== Release history ==
Release dates and formats for Therapy
Region	Date	Format	Version	Label	Ref.
Various	23 July 2021	Cassette; CD; digital download; streaming; vinyl	Standard	Major Tom's; Asylum	
Japan	23 July 2021	CD	Japan bonus	Warner Music Japan	
