= Demographics of Ivory Coast =

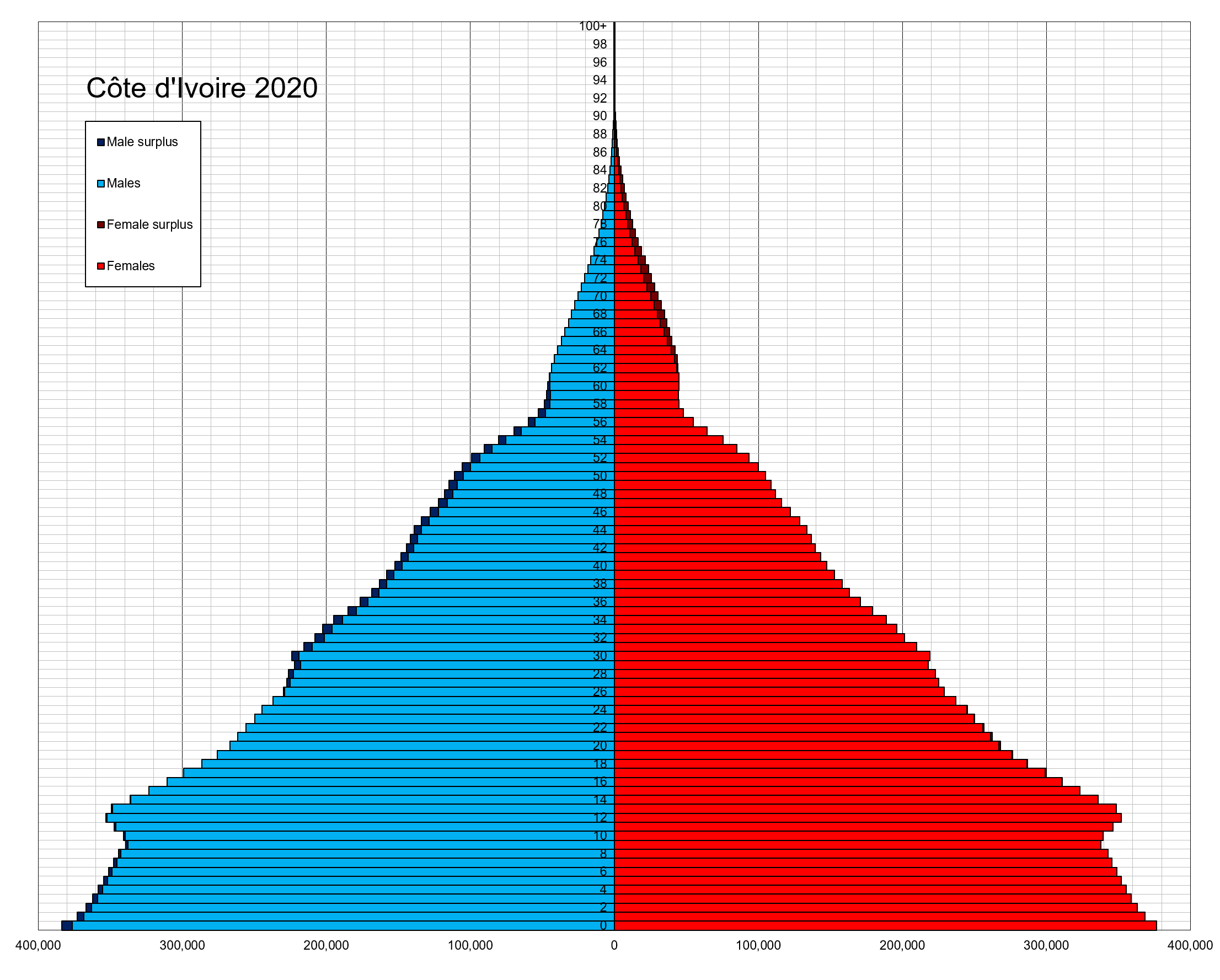
- Population pyramid of the Ivory Coast in 2020
- Population: 28,713,423 (2022 abidjan est.)
- Growth rate: 2.19% (2022 est.)
- Birth rate: 28.3 births/1,000 population (2022 est.)
- Death rate: 7.6 deaths/1,000 population (2022 est.)
- Life expectancy: 62.26 years
  - male: 60.07 years
  - female: 64.52 years
- Fertility rate: 3.53 children born/woman (2022 est.)
- Infant mortality: 55.67 deaths/1,000 live births
- Net migration rate: 1.18 migrant(s)/1,000 population (2022 est.)
- Immigrant share: 9.0% (2024)

Age structure
- 0–14 years: 38.53%
- 65 and over: 2.85%

Sex ratio
- Total: 0.97 male(s)/female (2022 est.)
- At birth: 1.03 male(s)/female
- Under 15: 1.06 male(s)/female
- 65 and over: 0.58 male(s)/female

Nationality
- Nationality: Ivoirian

Language
- Official: French

Historical population
Year	Pop.	±%
1950	2,630,000	—
1960	3,504,000	+33.2%
1970	5,102,000	+45.6%
1980	8,034,000	+57.5%
1990	11,925,000	+48.4%
2000	16,455,000	+38.0%
2010	21,530,000	+30.8%
2020	26,812,000	+24.5%

Demographic features of the population of Ivory Coast include population density, ethnicity, education level, health of the populace, economic status, religious affiliations and other aspects of the population.

== Population ==
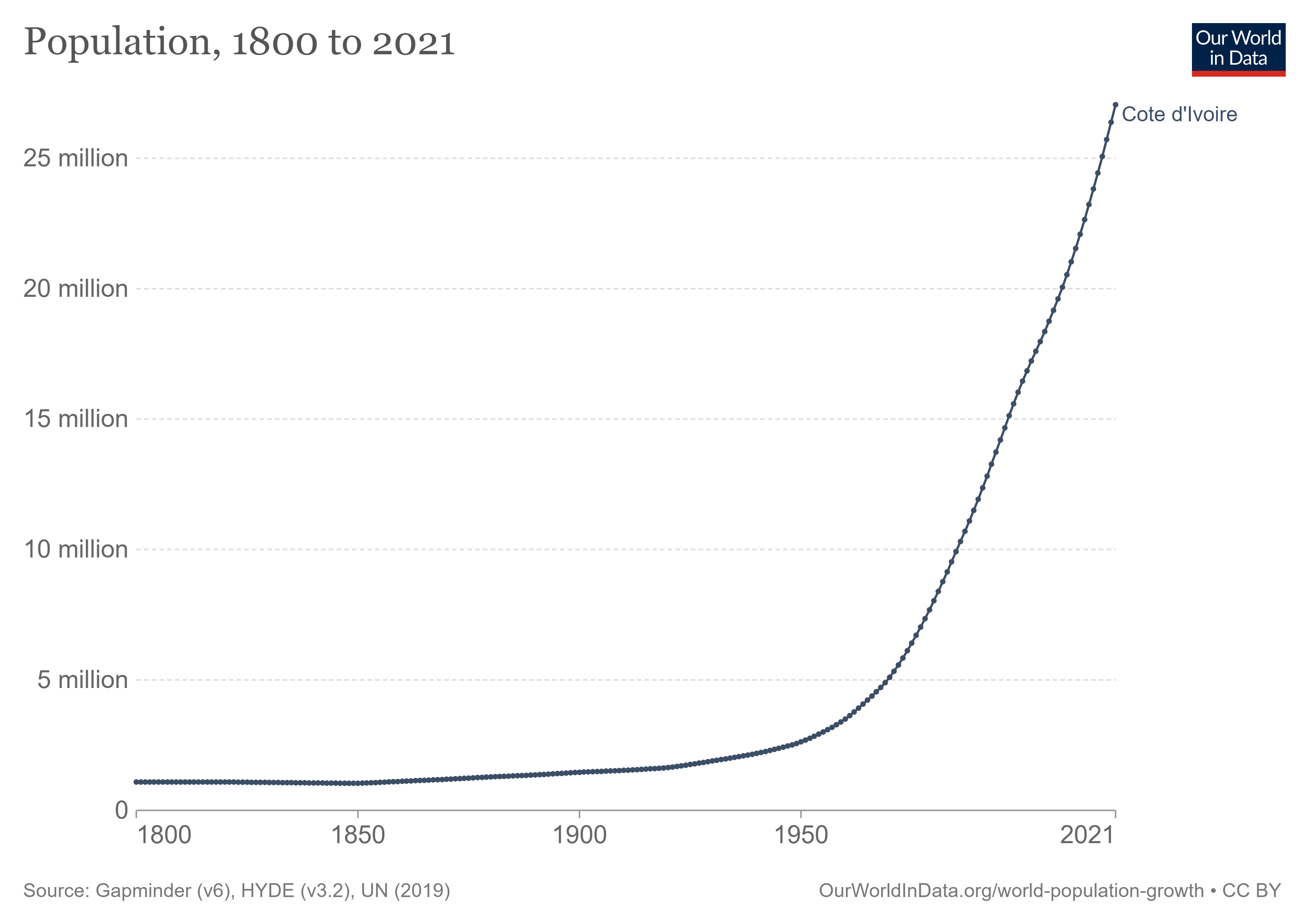
Demographics of Ivory Coast from Our World in Data, 2022; number of inhabitants in thousands.

Population, fertility rate and net reproduction rate, United Nations estimates

According to the 2022 revision of the World Population Prospects the total population was 27,478,249 in 2021, compared to only 2 630 000 in 1950. The proportion of children below the age of 15 in 2010 was 40.9%, 55.3% was between 15 and 65 years of age, while 3.8% was 65 years or older.

	Total population	Population aged 0–14 (%)	Population aged 15–64 (%)	Population aged 65+ (%)
1950	2,630,000	43.1	54.6	2.3
1955	3,072,000	43.0	54.6	2.4
1960	3,638,000	43.8	53.8	2.4
1965	4,424,000	44.6	52.9	2.4
1970	5,416,000	45.0	52.6	2.4
1975	6,768,000	45.4	52.2	2.4
1980	8,501,000	45.9	51.7	2.5
1985	10,495,000	45.9	51.5	2.5
1990	12,518,000	45.1	52.2	2.6
1995	14,677,000	43.2	54.0	2.8
2000	16,582,000	41.8	55.1	3.1
2005	18,021,000	41.8	54.8	3.5
2010	19,738,000	40.9	55.3	3.8

View source data.
View source data.
View source data.
View source data.

== Vital statistics ==
Registration of vital events in the Ivory Coast is not complete. The website Our World in Data prepared the following estimates based on statistics from the Population Department of the United Nations.

	Mid-year population	Live births	Deaths	Natural change	Crude birth rate (per 1000)	Crude death rate (per 1000)	Natural change (per 1000)	Total fertility rate (TFR)	Infant mortality (per 1000 live births)	Life expectancy (in years)
1950	2,737,000	150,000	89,000	60,000	54.8	32.7	22.1	7.61	238.7	32.11
1951	2,814,000	154,000	91,000	63,000	55.0	32.5	22.5	7.61	236.9	32.41
1952	2,894,000	159,000	92,000	67,000	55.1	31.9	23.1	7.61	233.1	32.93
1953	2,976,000	164,000	93,000	71,000	55.1	31.4	23.7	7.60	229.1	33.51
1954	3,063,000	168,000	94,000	74,000	55.1	30.8	24.3	7.60	224.9	34.09
1955	3,154,000	173,000	95,000	78,000	55.0	30.2	24.8	7.60	220.5	34.69
1956	3,251,000	178,000	96,000	82,000	54.9	29.5	25.4	7.60	215.8	35.42
1957	3,354,000	183,000	97,000	87,000	54.8	28.9	25.9	7.60	211.2	36.06
1958	3,463,000	189,000	97,000	91,000	54.6	28.2	26.5	7.61	206.7	36.77
1959	3,581,000	194,000	98,000	96,000	54.4	27.5	26.9	7.61	202.2	37.44
1960	3,709,000	202,000	99,000	103,000	54.8	26.9	27.9	7.69	197.8	38.11
1961	3,848,000	210,000	101,000	109,000	54.7	26.3	28.4	7.72	193.5	38.74
1962	3,998,000	218,000	102,000	115,000	54.7	25.7	28.9	7.75	189.1	39.40
1963	4,156,000	226,000	104,000	121,000	54.6	25.2	29.3	7.78	185.0	39.96
1964	4,321,000	234,000	106,000	128,000	54.4	24.6	29.8	7.81	181.0	40.61
1965	4,493,000	242,000	108,000	135,000	54.2	24.1	30.1	7.84	177.0	41.18
1966	4,671,000	251,000	109,000	142,000	53.9	23.5	30.5	7.87	173.1	41.82
1967	4,857,000	260,000	111,000	149,000	53.7	22.9	30.8	7.89	169.2	42.42
1968	5,050,000	269,000	113,000	157,000	53.5	22.4	31.1	7.91	165.3	43.02
1969	5,255,000	278,000	114,000	164,000	53.2	21.8	31.4	7.93	161.5	43.64
1970	5,477,000	288,000	115,000	173,000	52.8	21.2	31.7	7.94	157.6	44.33
1971	5,719,000	299,000	117,000	182,000	52.6	20.6	32.1	7.94	153.4	44.99
1972	5,980,000	311,000	118,000	193,000	52.4	19.9	32.5	7.94	148.9	45.72
1973	6,257,000	325,000	120,000	206,000	52.3	19.3	33.1	7.94	144.3	46.56
1974	6,549,000	340,000	121,000	219,000	52.2	18.5	33.6	7.93	139.4	47.51
1975	6,854,000	354,000	122,000	232,000	51.9	17.9	34.0	7.91	134.6	48.35
1976	7,143,000	368,000	122,000	246,000	51.6	17.1	34.4	7.88	129.8	49.29
1977	7,416,000	389,000	123,000	266,000	52.5	16.6	35.9	7.83	125.4	50.18
1978	7,701,000	404,000	124,000	280,000	52.5	16.2	36.3	7.67	121.3	50.93
1979	7,996,000	423,000	126,000	297,000	52.8	15.7	37.1	7.63	117.8	51.68
1980	8,304,000	438,000	127,000	311,000	52.8	15.3	37.5	7.59	114.8	52.27
1981	8,622,000	452,000	129,000	323,000	52.4	14.9	37.4	7.54	112.3	52.73
1982	8,948,000	463,000	131,000	332,000	51.7	14.7	37.1	7.49	110.2	52.92
1983	9,282,000	473,000	133,000	340,000	51.0	14.4	36.6	7.42	108.5	53.17
1984	9,621,000	481,000	137,000	344,000	50.0	14.2	35.8	7.35	107.1	53.04
1985	9,964,000	487,000	139,000	348,000	48.9	14.0	34.9	7.27	106.1	53.17
1986	10,309,000	493,000	142,000	351,000	47.8	13.8	34.1	7.18	105.3	53.20
1987	10,663,000	498,000	145,000	353,000	46.7	13.6	33.1	7.08	104.9	53.19
1988	11,043,000	507,000	149,000	358,000	46.0	13.5	32.5	6.96	104.7	53.02
1989	11,463,000	539,000	157,000	382,000	47.1	13.7	33.4	6.84	104.8	52.88
1990	11,911,000	556,000	165,000	391,000	46.8	13.9	32.9	6.73	105.0	52.60
1991	12,369,000	573,000	173,000	400,000	46.4	14.0	32.4	6.61	105.3	52.32
1992	12,838,000	589,000	181,000	409,000	46.0	14.1	31.9	6.46	105.5	52.14
1993	13,316,000	604,000	188,000	415,000	45.4	14.2	31.3	6.31	105.6	51.93
1994	13,802,000	618,000	196,000	423,000	44.9	14.2	30.7	6.16	105.6	51.74
1995	14,300,000	642,000	203,000	439,000	45.0	14.2	30.8	6.09	105.4	51.61
1996	14,811,000	663,000	211,000	452,000	44.8	14.3	30.6	6.01	104.7	51.52
1997	15,335,000	689,000	218,000	470,000	45.0	14.3	30.7	5.95	103.7	51.45
1998	15,859,000	716,000	228,000	488,000	45.2	14.4	30.8	5.90	102.5	51.11
1999	16,346,000	737,000	235,000	501,000	45.0	14.4	30.6	5.85	101.0	50.96
2000	16,800,000	753,000	241,000	513,000	44.8	14.3	30.5	5.81	99.3	50.84
2001	17,245,000	764,000	245,000	519,000	44.2	14.1	30.0	5.76	97.4	50.81
2002	17,684,000	772,000	247,000	525,000	43.5	13.9	29.6	5.71	95.4	50.89
2003	18,116,000	782,000	251,000	531,000	43.0	13.8	29.2	5.64	93.3	50.95
2004	18,545,000	785,000	250,000	535,000	42.2	13.5	28.8	5.55	91.0	51.36
2005	18,970,000	792,000	250,000	542,000	41.6	13.1	28.5	5.46	88.6	51.82
2006	19,394,000	796,000	248,000	548,000	40.9	12.8	28.2	5.38	86.4	52.36
2007	19,818,000	800,000	246,000	554,000	40.2	12.4	27.9	5.30	84.1	52.97
2008	20,244,000	806,000	243,000	563,000	39.7	12.0	27.7	5.22	81.6	53.65
2009	20,678,000	813,000	239,000	574,000	39.2	11.5	27.7	5.15	78.9	54.39
2010	21,120,000	823,000	237,000	585,000	38.8	11.2	27.6	5.09	76.6	55.02
2011	21,563,000	832,000	236,000	595,000	38.4	10.9	27.5	5.03	74.6	55.52
2012	22,011,000	833,000	232,000	601,000	37.7	10.5	27.2	4.97	72.6	56.16
2013	22,469,000	837,000	229,000	609,000	37.1	10.1	27.0	4.92	70.6	56.75
2014	22,996,000	842,000	227,000	616,000	36.6	9.8	26.8	4.87	68.5	57.21
2015	23,597,000	857,000	225,000	631,000	36.3	9.5	26.7	4.81	66.6	57.76
2016	24,214,000	871,000	227,000	644,000	36.0	9.4	26.6	4.76	65.1	58.06
2017	24,848,000	892,000	228,000	664,000	35.9	9.2	26.7	4.74	63.5	58.48
2018	25,494,000	893,000	229,000	664,000	35.0	9.0	26.0	4.61	61.7	58.85
2019	27,828,000	967,000	239,000	728,000	34.3	8.5	25.8	4.52	57.8	60.3
2020	28,558,000	973,000	246,000	727,000	33.7	8.5	25.2	4.46	56.2	60.1
2021	29,273,000	981,000	248,000	732,000	33.1	8.4	24.7	4.41	54.6	60.3
2022	30,006,000	988,000	238,000	750,000	32.5	7.8	24.7	4.35	53.1	61.6
2023	30,784,000	997,000	239,000	758,000	32.0	7.7	24.3	4.28	51.7	61.9
2024					31.6	7.6	24.0	4.23		
2025					31.1	7.6	23.6	4.17		

=== Age distribution ===
Population by sex and age group (Census 15.V.2014):

Age group	Male	Female	Total	%
Total	11 708 244	10 963 087	22 671 331	100
0–4	1 902 052	1 784 695	3 686 747	16.26
5–9	1 635 039	1 530 608	3 165 647	13.96
10–14	1 391 732	1 237 225	2 628 957	11.60
15–19	1 075 555	1 039 026	2 114 581	9.33
20–24	1 022 190	1 083 404	2 105 594	9.29
25–29	997 460	1 052 924	2 050 384	9.04
30–34	908 792	861 990	1 770 782	7.81
35–39	744 301	615 168	1 359 469	6.00
40–44	555 990	446 595	1 002 585	4.42
45–49	419 350	361 691	781 041	3.45
50–54	337 817	304 158	641 975	2.83
55–59	240 117	205 324	445 441	1.96
60–64	183 494	154 187	337 681	1.49
65–69	118 203	109 006	227 209	1.00
70–74	78 643	76 904	155 547	0.69
75–79	44 041	44 520	88 561	0.39
80–84	25 866	28 818	54 684	0.24
85–89	9 206	9 561	18 767	0.08
90–94	4 183	5 187	9 370	0.04
95–99	8 982	8 573	17 555	0.08
100+	1 842	2 452	4 294	0.02
Age group	Male	Female	Total	Percent
0–14	4 928 823	4 552 528	9 481 351	41.82
15–64	6 485 066	6 124 467	12 609 533	55.62
65+	290 966	285 021	575 987	2.54
Unknown	3 389	1 071	4 460	0.02

Population estimates by sex and age group (01.VII.2020) (Based on the results of the 2014 Population Census.):

Age group	Male	Female	Total	%
Total	13 645 276	12 808 266	26 453 542	100
0–4	2 215 581	2 078 290	4 293 871	16.23
5–9	1 904 038	1 738 782	3 687 820	13.94
10–14	1 619 573	1 444 494	3 064 067	11.58
15–19	1 250 259	1 215 196	2 465 455	9.32
20–24	1 193 895	1 268 338	2 462 233	9.31
25–29	1 166 522	1 233 446	2 399 968	9.07
30–34	1 062 194	1 008 346	2 070 540	7.83
35–39	869 320	719 869	1 589 189	6.01
40–44	649 418	522 577	1 171 995	4.43
45–49	489 000	423 104	912 104	3.45
50–54	393 651	356 058	749 709	2.83
55–59	280 097	241 108	521 205	1.97
60–64	214 207	181 241	395 448	1.49
65–69	137 997	128 232	266 229	1.01
70–74	92 168	90 147	182 315	0.69
75–79	51 684	52 248	103 932	0.39
80–84	30 133	33 822	63 955	0.24
85–89	10 708	11 076	21 784	0.08
90–94	4 816	5 966	10 782	0.04
95+	10 015	10 926	20 941	0.08
Age group	Male	Female	Total	Percent
0–14	5 739 192	5 261 566	11 000 758	41.59
15–64	7 568 563	7 214 283	14 782 846	55.88
65+	337 521	332 417	669 938	2.53

Population by sex and age group (Census 08.XI.2021):

Age group	Male	Female	Total	%
Total	15 344 990	14 044 160	29 389 150	100
0–4	1 906 918	1 789 383	3 696 301	12.58
5–9	2 046 712	1 909 238	3 955 950	13.46
10–14	1 874 880	1 698 142	3 573 022	12.16
15–19	1 698 488	1 529 343	3 227 831	10.98
20–24	1 527 341	1 470 418	2 997 759	10.20
25–29	1 209 371	1 239 670	2 449 041	8.33
30–34	1 163 625	1 148 477	2 312 102	7.87
35–39	1 033 936	913 966	1 947 902	6.63
40–44	865 312	665 742	1 531 054	5.21
45–49	609 354	440 056	1 049 410	3.57
50–54	458 662	360 814	819 476	2.79
55–59	308 261	267 244	575 505	1.96
60–64	252 433	222 897	475 330	1.62
65–69	162 331	141 412	303 743	1.03
70–74	103 482	100 911	204 393	0.70
75–79	54 911	59 487	114 398	0.39
80–84	30 402	39 502	69 904	0.24
85–89	12 545	17 461	30 006	0.10
90–94	5 885	9 391	15 276	0.05
95–99	2 842	3 831	6 673	0.02
100+	4 164	5 903	10 067	0.03
Age group	Male	Female	Total	Percent
0–14	5 828 510	5 396 763	11 225 273	38.20
15–64	9 126 783	8 258 627	17 385 410	59.16
65+	376 562	377 898	754 460	2.57
Unknown	13 135	10 872	24 007	0.08

=== Fertility ===
Total fertility rate (TFR) (wanted fertility rate) and crude birth rate (CBR):

Year	Total		Urban		Rural	
Year	CBR	TFR	CBR	TFR	CBR	TFR
1994	41.3	5.7 (4.7)	38.8	4.7 (3.7)	42.5	6.4 (5.4)
1998–99	39.3	5.2 (4.5)	36.5	4.0 (3.4)	40.7	6.0 (5.2)
2005	38.4	4.6	35.1	3.6	40.8	5.5
2011–12	36.8	5.0 (4.1)	31.9	3.7 (3.2)	40.3	6.3 (5.0)
2021	32.4	4.3 (3.9)	29.9	3.6 (3.3)	35.4	5.3 (4.9)

Fertility data as of 2011-2012 (DHS Program):

Region	Total fertility rate	Percentage of women age 15-49 currently pregnant	Mean number of children ever born to women age 40–49
Centre	6.1	10.6	6.9
Centre-Est	4.6	7.7	5.4
Centre-Nord	5.4	9.6	6.1
Centre-Ouest	5.4	11.0	5.7
Nord	6.1	9.7	6.9
Nord-Est	6.0	11.5	6.6
Nord-Ouest	6.8	12.4	7.1
Ouest	6.1	12.4	6.2
Sud	4.8	10.6	6.0
Sud-Ouest	5.0	15.5	5.9
Ville d'Abidjan	3.1	6.9	4.2

Years	1925	1926	1927	1928	1929
Total Fertility Rate in Ivory Coast	6.78	6.77	6.77	6.76	6.75

Years	1930	1931	1932	1933	1934	1935	1936	1937	1938	1939
Total Fertility Rate in Ivory Coast	6.75	6.74	6.74	6.73	6.72	6.72	6.71	6.70	6.70	6.69

Years	1940	1941	1942	1943	1944	1945	1946	1947	1948	1949
Total Fertility Rate in Ivory Coast	6.69	6.68	6.67	6.67	6.66	6.65	6.65	6.64	6.63	6.63

== Ethnic groups ==
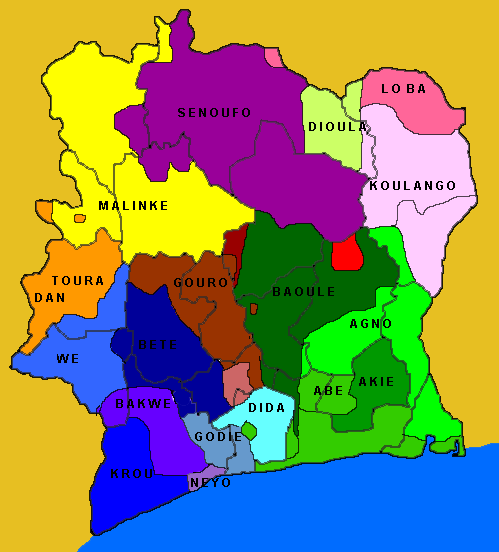
Ethnic groups

Ethnic groups in Ivory Coast
Ethnic groups
Akan	28.9%
Other (includes Pakistanis and Lebanese)	24.2%
Voltaic or Gur	16.1%
Northern Mandé	14.5%
Krou	8.5%
Southern Mandé	6.9%
Unspecified	0.9%

Ivory Coast has more than 60 ethnic groups, usually classified into five principal divisions: Akan (east and center, including Lagoon peoples of the southeast), Krou (southwest), Southern Mandé (west), Northern Mandé (northwest), Sénoufo/Lobi (north center and northeast). The Baoulés, in the Akan division, probably comprise the largest single subgroup with 15%-20% of the population. They are based in the central region around Bouaké and Yamoussoukro. The Bétés in the Krou division, the Sénoufos in the north, and the Malinkés in the northwest and the cities are the next largest groups, with 10%-15% of the national population. Most of the principal divisions have a significant presence in neighboring countries.

== Migration ==
=== Immigration ===
Of the more than 5 million non-Ivorian Africans living in Ivory Coast, one-third to one-half are from Burkina Faso; the rest are from Ghana, Guinea, Mali, Niger, Nigeria, Benin, Senegal, Liberia, and Mauritania.

Non-Africans in the country include French people, Lebanese people, Vietnamese people, Spaniards, Americans and Canadians.

=== Emigration ===
The table below shows the number of people born in Ivory Coast who have migrated to OECD countries only (the table only includes communities consisting of at least 1,000 members).

Country	Ivorian-born population	See also
France	63,441	Ivorians in France
Canada	22,625	
United States	7,595	Ivorian Americans
Italy	28,385	
United Kingdom	2,794	Ivorians in the United Kingdom
Belgium	1,363	
Switzerland	1,100	

== Languages ==
French is the official language, while there are 60 living indigenous languages spoken in Ivory Coast. The Dioula dialect of Bambara is the most widely spoken one. Other language groups include the Gur languages, the Kru languages (including the Bété languages, Dida, Nyabwa, Wè, and Western Krahn), the Kwa languages (including Akan, Anyin, and Baoulé), and the Senufo languages.

== Religion ==
Religions of the Ivory Coast (2014 est.)
Religions	percent
Islam	42.5%
Roman Catholic	16.6%
Pentecostal	13.4%
No religion	12.6%
Evangelical	7.8%
Other Christian	4.2%
Animist	2.2%
Other	0.7%

The economic development and relative prosperity of Ivory Coast fostered huge demographic shifts during the 20th century. "In 1922, an estimated 100,000 out of 1.6 million (or 6 percent) of people in Côte d'Ivoire were Muslims. By contrast, at independence (in 1960), their share of the population had increased rapidly, and Muslims were moving southward to the cocoa-producing areas and the southern cities. By 1998, [...], Muslims constituted a majority in the north of the country, and approximately 38.6 percent of the total population. This was a significantly larger population than the next largest religious group, Christians, who constituted approximately 29.1 percent of the total." In earlier decades, this shift was mainly due to large-scale immigration from neighboring countries of the interior, that has been going on since colonial times and continued to be promoted during the Houphouet-Boigny era. Since the 1990s, the widening conversion gap between different religious groups has started to tilt the demographic balance in favor of Christians. According to the last census of 2021 Muslims make up 42.5% of population (42.9% in 2014) and Christians 39.8% (33.9% in 2014).

== See also ==
- French people in Ivory Coast
