= Nathan Dawe =

English DJ and record producer (born 1994)

- Born: Nathan John Dawe; 25 May 1994 (age 32); Burton upon Trent, Staffordshire, England
- Genres: House; electronic dance music
- Occupations: Record producer; DJ
- Years active: 2010–present
- Label: Atlantic
- Website: nathandawemusic.com

Nathan John Dawe (born 25 May 1994) is an English DJ and record producer. He is best known for his 2020 single "Lighter" featuring KSI, which reached number 3 on the UK Singles Chart.

== Early life and career ==
Nathan Dawe was born on 25 May 1994 in Burton upon Trent, Staffordshire, England and attended Blessed Robert Sutton Catholic Sports College. He is a lifelong supporter of Aston Villa football club.

He built a loyal following by releasing mixes on SoundCloud. Rather than the usual genre-specific mixes being put out, he released mashup multi-genre mixes covering everything from house music to hip-hop, reggae, bassline and pop. Nathan was the first DJ without a radio show or hit single to sell out his own concert at the O2. He said, "It took me to the point where I was headlining massive festivals and performing sell out shows in huge clubs. I knew that wouldn't last forever, particularly with the rise of things like Spotify, so I set up a four-year plan and delved deeper into the production side of the industry." He began remixing other producers in his early twenties.

His debut single, "Cheatin'", based on an uncredited sample of Deborah Cox's "It's Over Now", was released in August 2018 and peaked at number 94 on the UK Singles Chart. In May 2019, he released the single "Repeat After Me", featuring vocals from Melissa Steel. He released the single "Flowers" in October 2019, featuring vocals from garage legend Malika and credited vocals from rapper Jaykae. Dawe's "Flowers" peaked at number 12 on the UK Singles Chart.

On 24 July 2020, his song "Lighter", which he made in collaboration with British YouTuber KSI was released, it featured uncredited vocals from Ella Henderson. After the chart success in the UK, he was signed to Warner/Chappell Music.

On 25 November 2020, Dawe released the song "No Time for Tears" with British girl group Little Mix. On 9 April 2021, Dawe collaborated with Anne-Marie and rapper MoStack on the song "Way Too Long". On 24 September 2021, Dawe released the song "Goodbye" with English DJ T. Matthias.

On 29 April 2022, he released the song "21 Reasons" featuring Ella Henderson, which became one of two songs in the UK Top 30 in June 2022 based around the same "Calabria" sample (the other being by West London drill rapper Benzz).

== Personal life ==
Dawe is an Aston Villa foundation ambassador.

== Discography ==
=== Extended plays ===
Title	Details
If Heaven Had a Phone Line	Released: 7 July 2023; Format: Streaming; Label: Warner Music Group

=== Singles ===
Title	Year	Peak chart positions										Certifications	Album
Title	Year	UK	UK Dance	BEL (Fl) Dance	CZE	HUN	IRE	LAT Air.	NZ Hot	SCO	US Dance	Certifications	Album
"Cheatin" (featuring Malika)	2018	94	10	—	—	—	—	—	—	—	—	BPI: Platinum	Non-album singles
"Repeat After Me" (featuring Melissa Steel)	2019	—	—	—	—	—	—	—	—	—	—		Non-album singles
"Flowers" (featuring Jaykae and Malika)	2019	12	1	—	—	—	14	—	—	11	—	BPI: Platinum	If Heaven Had a Phone Line
"Lighter" (featuring KSI)	2020	3	2	48	37	15	8	42	17	1	18	BPI: Platinum	If Heaven Had a Phone Line
"No Time for Tears" (with Little Mix)	2020	19	6	—	65	—	15	—	35	—	22	BPI: Gold	Confetti (Expanded Edition)
"Way Too Long" (with Anne-Marie and MoStack)	2021	37	13	—	—	—	37	—	—	—	—	BPI: Silver	Therapy
"Goodbye" (with T. Matthias)	2021	85	23	—	—	—	—	—	—	—	—		Non-album single
"21 Reasons" (featuring Ella Henderson)	2022	9	4	—	—	—	8	—	—	—	13	BPI: Platinum	If Heaven Had a Phone Line
"Sweet Lies" (featuring Talia Mar)	2022	61	—	—	—	—	—	—	—	—	—		If Heaven Had a Phone Line
"Oh Baby" (featuring Bru-C, Issey Cross and BSHP)	2023	35	—	—	—	—	—	—	20	—	—	BPI: Silver	If Heaven Had a Phone Line
"0800 Heaven" (Note: "0800 Heaven" also features on Joel Corry's debut studio album Another Friday Night.) (featuring Joel Corry and Ella Henderson)	2023	9	3	—	—	—	13	—	—	—	—	BPI: Platinum	If Heaven Had a Phone Line
"Heart Still Beating" (with Bebe Rexha)	2023	74	39	—	—	—	—	—	33	—	44		Non-album singles
"We Ain't Here for Long"	2024	45	17	—	—	—	89	—	—	—	—	BPI: Silver	Non-album singles
"Ten (Get Back Up)" (with MNEK)	2024	—	—	—	—	—	—	—	—	—	—		Non-album singles
"Higher" (with Joel Corry featuring Sacha)	2024	—	—	—	—	—	—	—	—	—	—		Non-album singles
"Lost Myself" (with Window Kid)	2024	—	—	—	—	—	—	—	—	—	—		Non-album singles
"Here in Your Arms" (with Abi Flynn)	2025	34	6	—	—	—	—	—	—	—	—	BPI: Silver	Non-album singles
"Over You" (with Shayan)	2025	63	18	—	—	—	—	—	—	—	—		Non-album singles
"Cola" (with Tion Wayne)	2026	—	—	—	—	—	—	—	—	—	—		Non-album singles
"Missin’ U" (with JustHooks)	2026	—	—	—	—	—	—	—	—	—	—		Non-album singles
"—" denotes a recording that did not chart or was not released in that territory.

=== Remixes ===
Title	Year	Original artist(s)
"Walk Alone" (featuring Tom Walker)	2020	Rudimental
"Dancing in the Moonlight" (featuring Neimy)	2020	Jubël
"Break Up Song"	2020	Little Mix
"Take Care of You"	2020	Ella Henderson
"Naked"	2020	Jonas Blue, Max
"Electric Sun"	2020	Tiggi Hawke
"So Annoying"	2020	Mae Muller
"Bang!"	2020	AJR
"Loose" (featuring KSI)	2020	S1mba
"Afraid" (featuring Harlee)	2020	James Hype
"Gold"	2020	Paloma Faith
"Space"	2020	Becky Hill
"Haiti"	2021	Welshy
"Higher" (featuring Iann Dior)	2021	Clean Bandit
"Don't Play"	2021	Anne-Marie featuring KSI Digital Farm Animals
"Sacrifice"	2021	Bebe Rexha
"In The Night"	2021	Joy Club
"No Diggity"	2021	Lucas & Steve, Blackstreet
"Free" (featuring Tyrone & Chris Nichols)	2021	Bad Boy Chiller Crew
"Swerve"	2021	Jay1, KSI
"Love With You" (Nathan Dawe and Morgan Vocal Edit)	2021	Spencer Ramsey
"You & I"	2021	Navos, Harlee
"Anyone For You (Tiger Lily)"	2022	George Ezra
"The Motto"	2022	Tiësto, Ava Max
"All My Loving"	2022	Sam Fischer
"Rainfall (Praise You)"	2022	Tom Santa
"Deep Down" (featuring Never Dull)	2022	Alok, Ella Eyre, Kenny Dope
"You Let Me Down"	2022	Alessia Cara

=== Production and songwriting credits ===
Title	Year	Artist(s)	Album	Credit(s)
"Unlovable" (featuring Rudimental)	2021	Anne-Marie	Therapy	Co-Writer
"Better Not Together"	2021	Anne-Marie	Therapy	Co-Writer
