= Fashion Week (song) =

Single by Steel Banglez featuring AJ Tracey and MoStack
- Released: 21 March 2019
- Genre: Hip hop, afroswing
- Length: 3:21
- Label: Gifted Music
- Songwriter(s): Montell Daley; Paul Goller; Ché Grant; Pahuldip Sandhu; Keven Wolfsohn
- Producer(s): Steel Banglez; The Elements

Steel Banglez singles chronology
| "Hot Steppa" (2018) | "Fashion Week" (2019) |

AJ Tracey singles chronology
| "Necklace" (2019) | "Fashion Week" (2019) | "Ladbroke Grove" (2019) |

MoStack singles chronology
| "Teach You Gangsta" (2018) | "Fashion Week" (2019) | "Daily Duppy" (2019) |

"Fashion Week" is a song by British producer Steel Banglez, featuring vocals from rappers AJ Tracey and MoStack. Following its premiere as BBC Radio 1 DJ Annie Mac's Hottest Record, it was released as a single through Gifted Music on 21 March 2019, peaking at number seven on the UK Singles Chart. The song was written by Montell Daley, Paul Goller, Ché Grant, Pahuldip Sandhu, and Keven Wolfsohn, and produced by Banglez and The Elements.

== Track listing ==
Digital download
| No. | Title | Length |
|---|---|---|
| 1. | "Fashion Week" | 3:21 |

== Charts ==
| Chart (2019) | Peak position |
|---|---|
| Ireland (IRMA) | 69 |
| UK Singles (OCC) | 7 |
| UK Hip Hop/R&B (OCC) | 4 |

== Certifications ==
| Region | Certification | Certified units/sales |
|---|---|---|
| United Kingdom (BPI) | Platinum | 600,000^{‡} |
^{‡} Sales+streaming figures based on certification alone.
