= Wild (MoStack song) =

Single by MoStack

from the album Stacko
- Released: 2 May 2019
- Genre: British hip hop, Afroswing
- Length: 3:07
- Label: Virgin EMI
- Songwriter(s): Montell Daley; Amish Dilipkumar Patel; Lionel Richie
- Producer(s): ADP

MoStack singles chronology
"Daily Duppy" (2019)	"Wild" (2019)	"Shine Girl" (2019)

"Wild" is a song by British rapper MoStack. Following its premiere as BBC Radio 1 DJ Jack Saunders' Hottest Record, it was released as the lead single from MoStack's debut studio album Stacko through Virgin EMI on 2 May 2019; where it peaked at number 41 on the UK Singles Chart. The song was written by Montell Daley, Amish Dilipkumar Patel, and Lionel Richie, and produced by ADP. The song samples "Easy" by Commodores (written by Lionel Richie).

== Track listing ==
Digital download
No.	Title	Length
1.	"Wild"	3:07

== Charts ==
Chart (2019)	Peak position
UK Hip Hop/R&B (OCC)	17
UK Singles (OCC)	41
