= Stinking Rich =

Song by MoStack and J Hus featuring Dave

from the album Stacko
- Released: 7 June 2019
- Genre: Afroswing
- Length: 3:31
- Label: MizerMillion Entertainment; Virgin EMI
- Songwriters: Montell Daley; Darius Forde; James Grant; David Omoregie; Momodou Jallow
- Producer: iLL BLU

"Stinking Rich" is a song recorded by British rappers MoStack and J Hus featuring British rapper Dave that appears on MoStack's debut studio album Stacko. The song was written by MoStack, J Hus, Dave, and Darius Forde and James Grant (also known as iLL BLU), and produced by iLL BLU.

Commercially, the song reached the top 20 in the United Kingdom and top 100 in Ireland.

== Charts ==
Chart (2019)	Peak position
Ireland (IRMA)	74
UK Singles (OCC)	19
UK Hip Hop/R&B (OCC)	9
