= IAMDDB =

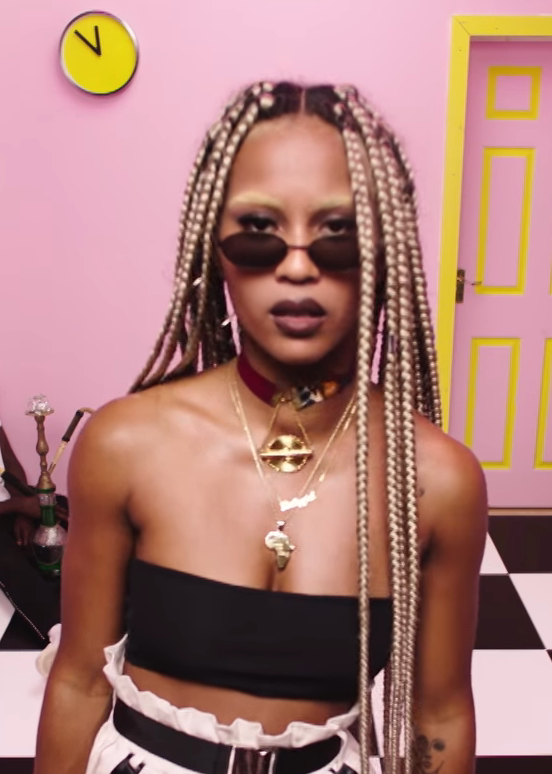

Background information
- Also known as: Diana DeBrito
- Born: Diana Adelaide Rocha De Brito; 5 March 1996 (age 30); Lisbon, Portugal
- Genres: Alternative hip hop; trap; jazz fusion; Neo soul
- Occupations: Rapper; singer-songwriter; actress; producer
- Instrument: Vocals
- Website: iamddbworld.com

Diana Adelaide Rocha De Brito, known professionally as IAMDDB, is an Angolan-Portuguese rapper and singer based in Manchester, United Kingdom. IAMDDB has released three EPs and three mixtapes as of 2021 and was listed number three on BBC Sound of 2018.

== Early life ==
Diana Adelaide Rocha De Brito was born on 5 March 1996 in Lisbon, Portugal to an Angolan-Portuguese father (Manuel De Brito) who worked as a sound engineer and bassist, and an Angolan mother. From a young age, she was immersed in music, spending countless hours in her father's home studio surrounded by instruments, vinyl records, and the sounds of jazz, soul, samba, classical music, and Afro-jazz.

Around the age of five or six, her family relocated to Manchester, United Kingdom, where she quickly adapted to her new surroundings despite speaking little English, an experience she recalls as more challenging for her family than for her. Growing up across various neighborhoods, she developed a strong identity as a Mancunian. Influenced by her father's eclectic musical tastes, she grew up listening to vocalists like Nat King Cole, Whitney Houston, Mariah Carey, and even genres like classical music, Afro-soul, and her own "Angolan frequencies". From infancy she recounts her parents would play Bob Marley recordings to lull her to sleep, and she would wake up as soon as the music stopped.

By age seven, Diana began writing her own songs, and by age eleven, she had already recorded her own music. Although she studied performing arts in college and continued to nurture her musical voice, it was not until her late teens that she truly recognized music as her professional calling. At around age 15, she took part in her school production of Grease as Rizzo where being on stage made her realize that performing was her true passion.

== Professional career ==
A defining moment in her artistic development came during a six-month tour of Angola, where she performed jazz along with her father's band. This experience immersed her in professional music-making by learning discipline, stage presence, and the rigors of rehearsals and performances. It also ignited her desire to pursue music full-time. After returning to the UK with newfound determination, she left higher education and independently released her debut single, "Leaned Out" in 2016, launching her career under the stage name IAMDDB, which is an acronym for I Am Diana De Brito, and introducing her self-defined genre of 'urban jazz'.

Over the next few years, she steadily built her discography with a series of critically acclaimed EPs and mixtapes that showcased her genre-blending artistry, such as Waeveybby Volume 1 (2016), Vibe Volume 2 (2017), Hoodrich Vol. 3 (2017), and Flightmode Vol. 4 (2018). Her breakout single "Shade" from Hoodrich Vol. 3 went viral, amassing tens of millions of views on YouTube & bringing significant attention to her creative vision. Her 2019 mixtape, Swervvvvv.5, is regarded as a career highlight. It features a compelling mix of trap, R&B, jazz inflections, and neo-soul, and includes Portuguese vocals as a nod to her heritage. Pitchfork praised it as her best work to date, noting its "freewheeling mixtapes" aesthetic and ability to set the stage for an anticipated full-length album.

IAMDDB subsequently achieved early recognition from major platforms. She placed third in BBC's Sound of 2018 poll. In 2019 she was featured on Forbes’ 30 Under 30 European Entertainment List.

De Brito rapidly became a touring force, supporting Lauryn Hill on the UK leg of her arena tour in 2018, an endorsement that elevated her visibility significantly. She also toured with prominent R&B artists like Bryson Tiller and Jhené Aiko, and performed at festivals such as Glastonbury, Afropunk, Parklife, Field Day, Reading & Leeds and more.

A defining trait of IAMDDB's approach has been her dedication to independence, marked by her never signing a major record deal. After early buzz, she founded her own imprint, Union IV Recordings, opting to release music at her own pace and maintain creative control over her output.

Following a four-year interval after Swervvvvv.5, IAMDDB gradually began working on her next project around 2020, during which she focused on restructuring her artistic direction and reclaiming control over her music and masters. In 2021, she released the spiritually uplifting single "Silver Lines", celebrating themes of sisterhood, healing, and self-empowerment. The song's vibrant video was filmed in Saint Lucia, amplifying its joyous and visual energy. In 2022, IAMDDB released several singles, including "Fucked Uppp" and "Yallah Habibti". These releases continued to explore themes of resilience and self-empowerment, resonating with her audience during challenging times. In 2023, IAMDDB she released a blend of drum & bass and R&B as the single "Where Did the Love Go?". Later that year, she released a double single titled "BET" & "Stop Playing With Me", featuring Len. Even In terms of live performances, IAMDDB made notable appearances including a performance at Rally 2023 in Southwark Park, London.

In January 2024, she released the single "Ibiza", accompanied by a visualizer that evoked sun-soaked nostalgia and served as the lead-in for her forthcoming album LOVE is WAR, Volume 6, which was announced to be released on 29 February 2024. The full album featuring 15 tracks, arrived as scheduled on 29 February 2024 and marked her official return with a full-length project. Additional releases included "Cry Baby" and "Rasta Pasta" (featuring Masego).

== Discography ==
=== Studio albums ===
- Love is War, Vol. 6 (2024)

=== Extended plays ===
- Waeveybby, Vol. 1 (2016)
- Vibe, Volume 2. (2017)
- Kare Package (2019)

=== Mixtapes ===
- Hoodrich, Vol. 3 (2017)
- Flightmode, Vol. 4 (2018)
- Swervvvvv.5 (2019)

=== Singles ===
- "JAZB (Flying Lotus)" (2016)
- "Selfless" (2016)
- "Leaned Out" (2016)
- "Shade" (2017)
- "Drippy" (2018)
- "Wokeuptoflexxx (WUTF)" (2019)
- "Night Kapp" (2019)
- "Famous" (2019)
- "Kare Package" (2019)
- "God's Work" (featuring iLL BLU) (2020)
- "Quarantine" (2020)
- "End of the World" (2020)
- "Wa'hum" (2020)
- "Silver Lines" (2021)
- "JGL" (2021)
- "F***ked Uppp" (2022)
- "Where Did the Love Go?" (2023)
- "Ibiza" (2023)
- "Cry Baby" (2023)
- "Rasta Pasta" (featuring Masego) (2023)
- "Bet" (2023)
- "Stop Playing with Me" (featuring Len) (2023)
- "ViBRATiON" (2024)

=== Collaborations ===
- Earth Tones EP by Lenzman (2017)
- We Could EP by Graeme S (2017)
  - "You Don't Know Me"
  - "Taking My Time [Explicit]"
- Jagged Tooth Crook EP by The Mouse Outfit (2018)
- "Mira Mira" (from Europa EP) by Diplo (2019)

=== Show Appearances ===
- Jungle (2022)
