= Way Too Long (Nathan Dawe, Anne-Marie and MoStack song) =

2021 single by Nathan Dawe, Anne-Marie and MoStack

Single by Nathan Dawe, Anne-Marie and MoStack

from the album Therapy
- Released: 9 April 2021
- Length: 2:30
- Label: Major Toms; Asylum; Warner
- Songwriter(s): Nathan Dawe; Anne-Marie Nicholson; Montell Daley; Tre Jean-Marie; Daniel Traynor; Uzoechi Emenike; Oladayo Olatunji; Michael Orabiyi; Ryan Campbell
- Producer(s): Dawe; Jean-Marie; Grades; Sire Noah

Nathan Dawe singles chronology
"No Time for Tears" (2020)	"Way Too Long" (2021)	"21 Reasons" (2022)

Anne-Marie singles chronology
"Don't Play" (2021)	"Way Too Long" (2021)	"Our Song" (2021)

MoStack singles chronology
"Change on Me" (2020)	"Way Too Long" (2021)	"Ride" (2021)

Music video
- "Way Too Long" on YouTube

"Way Too Long" is a song by English record producer Nathan Dawe, English singer-songwriter Anne-Marie and British rapper MoStack. It was released on 9 April 2021 as the second single from Anne-Marie's second studio album, Therapy. The song was produced by Dawe, Tre Jean-Marie, Grades and Sire Noah, and written by the three artists, Tre-Jean Marie, Grades, MNEK, Dyo, Scribz Riley and Ryan Campbell.

A music video was released along with the song.

== Track listings ==
- Digital release
1. "Way Too Long" – 2:30
- Digital release – Tyrone remix
1. "Way Too Long" (Tyrone remix) – 2:32
- Digital release – Navos remix
1. "Way Too Long" (Navos Remix) – 2:21
- Digital release – Acoustic
1. "Way Too Long" (Acoustic) – 2:40
- Digital release – Clean Bandit remix
1. "Our Song" (Clean Bandit remix) – 2:39

== Charts ==
Chart performance for "Way Too Long"
Chart (2021)	Peak position
Ireland (IRMA)	37
UK Singles (OCC)	37

== Release history ==
Release history and formats for "Way Too Long"
Region	Date	Format(s)	Version	Label(s)	Ref.
Various	9 April 2021	Digital download; streaming	Original	Warner	

== Certifications ==
Region	Certification	Certified units/sales
United Kingdom (BPI)	Silver	200,000^{‡}
^{‡} Sales+streaming figures based on certification alone.
