= Stacko =

Studio album by MoStack
- Released: 7 June 2019
- Genre: Afroswing
- Length: 39:51
- Label: MizerMillion Entertainment; Virgin EMI
- Producer: ADP; Hazard; iLL BLU; Levi Lennox; Steel Banglez; The Elements; TSB; Zeph Ellis

Singles from Stacko
- 1. "Wild" Released: 2 May 2019; 2. "Shine Girl" Released: 31 May 2019

Professional ratings
Review scores
| Source | Rating |
|---|---|
| The Guardian | 3/5 stars |

Stacko is the debut studio album by British rapper MoStack. It was released on 7 June 2019 via MizerMillion Entertainment and Virgin EMI. The album features guest appearances from British rappers J Hus, Dave, Stormzy, Fredo, and singer/songwriter Dolapo.

== Track listing ==
Credits adapted from Tidal.

| No. | Title | Writer(s) | Producer(s) | Length |
|---|---|---|---|---|
| 1. | "Yes Yes" | Montell Daley; Paul Goller; Pahuldip Sandhu; Keven Wolfsohn | Steel Banglez; The Elements; Zeph Ellis | 2:51 |
| 2. | "Shannon" | M Daley; TSB | TSB | 3:06 |
| 3. | "Stinking Rich" (with J Hus, featuring Dave) | M Daley; Darius Forde; James Grant; Momodou Jallow; David Omoregie | iLL BLU | 3:31 |
| 4. | "Respect & Love" | M Daley; D Forde; J Grant; Joe Reeves | iLL BLU | 3:15 |
| 5. | "Rock with You" | M Daley; D Forde; J Grant | iLL BLU | 2:39 |
| 6. | "Take Em Down" | M Daley; D Forde; J Grant | iLL BLU | 2:40 |
| 7. | "Shine Girl" (featuring Stormzy) | M Daley; D Forde; J Grant; Levi Lennox; Michael Owuo Jr.; TSB | iLL BLU; TSB; L Lennox | 2:53 |
| 8. | "I'm the One" (with Fredo) | Marvin Bailey; M Daley; P Sandhu; Hazard | Steel Banglez; Hazard | 2:59 |
| 9. | "Girl Diary" | M Daley; D Forde; J Grant; Alastair O'Donnell | iLL BLU | 2:59 |
| 10. | "Make Me Fall in Love & You Can Keep Me Forever" (featuring Dolapo) | M Daley; D Forde; J Grant; Dolapo Renner | iLL BLU | 3:19 |
| 11. | "I Want You" | M Daley; D Forde; J Grant; A O'Donnell | iLL BLU | 2:59 |
| 12. | "Wild" | M Daley; Amish Patel; Lionel Richie | ADP | 3:07 |
| 13. | "What I Wanna" | M Daley; D Forde; J Grant; Brenda Russell | iLL BLU | 3:33 |
| Total length: | | | | 39:51 |

== Charts ==
| Chart (2019) | Peak position |
|---|---|
| Dutch Albums (Album Top 100) | 58 |
| Irish Albums (IRMA) | 18 |
| UK Albums (Official Charts) | 3 |

== Certifications ==
| Region | Certification | Certified units/sales |
|---|---|---|
| United Kingdom (BPI) | Silver | 60,000^{‡} |
^{‡} Sales+streaming figures based on certification alone.
