= Ivorians in the United Kingdom =

Ivorian diaspora in the UK

Ivoirians in the United Kingdom
Total population
- Ivoirian-born residents 2,794 (2001 UK Census); Other population estimates 5,000-9,000 (2008 community leaders' estimates)

Regions with significant populations
- London, Birmingham

Languages
- French, Dioula, English.

Religion
- Islam; Roman Catholicism; Methodism

Ivoirians in the United Kingdom (Note: The demonym 'Ivoirian' is interchangeable with 'Ivorian', as is 'Côte d'Ivoire' and 'Ivory Coast'.) or Ivorian British (French: Ivoiriens au Royaume-Uni) are one of the country's smallest African immigrant groups, consisting of no more than 10,000 individuals. The group includes people born in Côte d'Ivoire who have migrated to the United Kingdom, as well as their British-born descendants.

== History and settlement ==
Ivoirians have been migrating to the UK since the late 20th century, albeit in smaller numbers than those who chose to start a new life in countries such as France. Côte d'Ivoire was under French rule between 1842 and 1960 and formed part of French West Africa. Prior to 1995, Ivoirians did not require a visa to visit the UK, and this is when significant migration to the UK started. The majority of early Ivoirian immigrants were students. The most recent wave of Ivoirian immigrants are much more heterogeneous. Many have fled political and economic instability in Côte d'Ivoire, following the death of Ivoirian president Félix Houphouët-Boigny in late 1993. The power struggle that followed forced many natives to flee before bloodshed similar to that seen in neighbouring Liberia. After the Badie régime was overthrown in 1999, attempts to stabilise a government were in vain and the fear of violence became reality during the Ivorian Civil War (2002–2007). Ivoirians migrating to the UK at this time were primarily asylum seekers and victims of war. Besides students and asylum seekers in the UK, there are many irregular Ivoirian migrants in the country, many of whom overstayed their visas. The IOM has suggested that this is down to their determination to succeed in the UK and not let themselves or their families down. Besides the continuing and increasing number of individuals leaving Côte d'Ivoire for a new life in the UK, there are also significant numbers of secondary migrants moving to the UK from France. France is seen as the hub of the Ivoirian diaspora however many older generations are in fact leaving the country for other nations such as the UK in hope of better prospects for their children and grandchildren. Many young men who have failed to settle and make a life for themselves in France have also left for the UK to "try again".

== Demographics ==
=== Population ===
According to the 2001 UK Census, a total of 2,794 people born in Côte d'Ivoire were residing in the UK in April 2001. This figure ranks 28th amongst African-born immigrant groups. The UK is home to the fourth largest overseas Ivoirian diaspora of any OECD country, behind the communities in France, the United States and Italy. There has been some secondary migration of Ivoirians to the UK from other European countries, including France. It is difficult to determine exactly how many Ivoirians are living in the UK because many avoid any form of official registration and are reluctant to report themselves to the Ivoirian embassy in London. Many Ivoirians who have immigrated to the UK have claimed political asylum, and in the period between 1997 and 2007, 910 people were granted asylum. In 2008, community leaders suggested that the population stood at between 5,000 and 9,000, although the International Organization for Migration states that "it is very difficult to verify these figures". The first wave of Ivoirian migrants to the UK in the early 1990s were almost all male, however there has been a significant increase in the number of female migrants in recent years. In terms of age range, a large percentage of the Ivoirian population in the UK are in between the ages of 35 and 45 having come in search for a new life in their twenties. By far the most common and preferred language amongst the community is French and within first generation immigrants, fluency in the English language is only really evident in students and scholars.

=== Population distribution ===
The majority of Ivoirians (between 3,000 and 4,500) reside in the British capital, London. London is the preferred destination for Ivoirian migrants due to its cosmopolitan nature, the belief that it offers greater and better employment prospects, as well as its long-established Ivoirian and Black African communities. Despite this, there is evidence that numerous Ivoirians who settled in London have since moved on to other cities. An estimated 2,000 to 3,000 Ivoirians reside in Birmingham, 400 to 1,000 in Newcastle upon Tyne and 100 to 200 in Glasgow. Outside of these large cities, many Ivoirian asylum seekers have been dispersed across the country by the British government, as part of a policy designed to lessen the financial burden on local councils in London and the south east.

=== Religion ===
Islam and Christianity are the two main religions in Côte d'Ivoire, however, there are also many indigenous African religions that Ivoirian people follow. Most Ivoirian Muslims in the UK belong to the Mandinka and Mandé ethnic groups from the north and north west of Côte d'Ivoire. Amongst the more commonly visited mosques amongst the community are Brixton Mosque, Lewisham Mosque, Kent Islamic Centre and the Old Kent Road Nigerian Mosque - all of these are located in and around Greater London which reflects the spread of Ivoirians in the UK themselves. The IOM has found evidence that within the UK's Ivoirian community, there are, in fact, larger followers of Christianity - the majority adhering to the Roman Catholic and Methodist faiths. There are many Ivoirian congregations and churches in London and across the UK and where Ivoirian communities aren't so prevalent, many decide to worship alongside other people from other African nations.

== Notable individuals ==
- Joseff Gnagbo, Welsh language activist

== See also ==
- Black British
- Demographics of Côte d'Ivoire
- Ivorian Americans
- Ivorians in France
