= Shine Girl =

Single by MoStack featuring Stormzy

from the album Stacko
- Released: 31 May 2019
- Length: 2:53
- Label: Virgin EMI
- Songwriter(s): Montell Daley; Darius Ellington Forde; James Grant; Levi Lennox; Michael Owuo Jr.; TSB
- Producer(s): iLL BLU; TSB; Levi Lennox

MoStack singles chronology
"Wild" (2019)	"Shine Girl" (2019)

Stormzy singles chronology
"Vossi Bop" (2019)	"Shine Girl" (2019)	"Crown" (2019)

Music video
- "Shine Girl" on YouTube

"Shine Girl" is a song by British rapper MoStack featuring British rapper Stormzy. It was released through Virgin EMI as the second single from MoStack's debut studio album Stacko on 31 May 2019; where it peaked at number 13 on the UK Singles Chart. The song was written by MoStack, James Grant, Darius Ellington Forde, Levi Lennox, Stormzy and TSB, and produced by iLL BLU, TSB and Lennox.

== Track listing ==
Digital download
No.	Title	Length
1.	"Shine Girl" (featuring Stormzy)	2:53

== Charts ==
Chart (2019)	Peak position
Ireland (IRMA)	64
UK Hip Hop/R&B (OCC)	5
UK Singles (OCC)	13

== Certifications ==
Region	Certification	Certified units/sales
United Kingdom (BPI)	Silver	200,000^{‡}
^{‡} Sales+streaming figures based on certification alone.
