= Afro B =

British DJ, musician (born 1993)

- Born: Ross-Emmanuel Bayeto; 25 February 1993 (age 33); Greenwich, London, England
- Genres: Afro-pop
- Occupations: DJ; singer; songwriter
- Instruments: Piano; vocals
- Years active: 2013–present
- Labels: Marathon Artists; Warner Chappell Music; Empire Distribution
- Website: Afro B on Twitter

Ross-Emmanuel Bayeto, (born 25 February 1993) better known as Afro B, is a British DJ, singer and songwriter known for his hit song "Drogba (Joanna)", which peaked at number 23 on the US Billboard R&B/Hip-Hop Airplay chart, was certified Gold by the British Phonographic Industry (BPI) and led to the creation of the "Drogba Challenge". He also coined the term "Afrowave", a "fusion of hip-hop, dancehall and Afrobeat melodies". He presents a Saturday night show on Capital Xtra, which is broadcast on DAB to most of the UK.

== Early life ==
Bayeto was born in south London to Ivorian and Akan parents, on 25 February 1993. In secondary school, St Paul's Academy, he learned how to play piano He was part of a group named the All Star Skankers and he later worked as a DJ in a London club named NW10.

== Discography ==
- Afrowave (2017)
- Afrowave 2 (2018)
- Afrowave 3 (2019)
