= In2 =

2015 song by WSTRN

Single by WSTRN
- Released: 20 July 2015
- Recorded: 2015
- Genre: Hip-hop; R&B; Afroswing
- Length: 4:02
- Label: Atlantic
- Songwriters: Akelle Charles; Haile; Louis Rei; Freek Van Workum; James McDowell; Nick Luscombe
- Producers: Parallel; N4

WSTRN singles chronology
"In2" (2015)	"Come Down" (2016)

"In2" is the debut single by the British R&B trio WSTRN. It was released on 20 July 2015 by Atlantic Records. The song peaked at number four on the UK singles chart, having initially reached No. 60 based on streams alone.

== Background and release ==
The song was originally accompanied by a low-budget video of a West London block party directed by Morgan Keyz, and uploaded onto the Link Up TV YouTube channel. It was credited as Akelle Charles featuring Haile and Louis Rei, and was due to be released as the first single from the trio's EP, Western Union. However, the three artists adopted the collective name WSTRN following the song's popularity, and re-branded the song with a new video following its signing to Atlantic Records.

== Chart performance ==
On 30 October, "In2" debuted at No. 85 in the top 100 of the UK singles chart, and climbed to No. 60 on 6 November, the day of its digital download release. For these two weeks, it charted on streams alone. Upon its digital release, the song entered the top 40 on 13 November at its peak of number four, becoming the trio's sole Top 40 hit as lead artists. In Australia, the track peaked at No. 10 for 4 weeks in January 2016, becoming the group's sole chart entry in the country.

== Track listing ==
Digital download – single
No.	Title	Length
1.	"In2"	4:02

Digital download – EP
No.	Title	Length
1.	"In2" (Remix) (featuring Wretch 32, Chip and Geko)	5:02
2.	"In2" (Kokiri Remix)	6:23
3.	"In2" (Baby Cham Remix)	4:21

Digital download – single (Kehlani Remix)
No.	Title	Length
1.	"In2" (Remix) (featuring Kehlani)	5:02

== Charts ==
=== Weekly charts ===
Chart (2015–2016)	Peak position
Australia (ARIA)	10
Ireland (IRMA)	64
New Zealand Heatseekers (RMNZ)	2
Scottish Singles Sales (Official Charts)	12
UK Singles (Official Charts)	4
UK Hip Hop/R&B (Official Charts)	1

=== Year-end charts ===
Chart (2016)	Position
UK Singles (OCC)	97

== Certifications ==
Region	Certification	Certified units/sales
Australia (ARIA)	Platinum	70,000^{‡}
United Kingdom (BPI)	2× Platinum	1,200,000^{‡}
^{‡} Sales+streaming figures based on certification alone.

== Release history ==
Region	Date	Label	Format
Worldwide	20 July 2015	Atlantic	Digital download

== See also ==
- List of UK R&B Singles Chart number ones of 2015
- List of UK R&B Singles Chart number ones of 2016
