= WSTRN =

British R&B and afroswing music collective

- Origin: West London, England
- Genres: British hip-hop; R&B; reggae fusion; Afroswing
- Years active: 2015–present
- Label: Atlantic
- Members: Haile; Louis Rei; Akelle Charles
- Website: wstrnmusic.com

WSTRN are a British hip-hop/R&B group from West London consisting of Akelle Charles, Haile (born Ras Haile Alexander), and Louis Rei (born Louis-Rae Beadle). Their debut single, "In2", was released on 20 July 2015, and peaked at number 4 on the UK Singles Chart. Louis Rei was formerly known as LB and Akelle was formerly known as A-Star. Haile has featured on several tracks as a solo artist.

== Background ==
The band's name bears no relevance to westerns; according to the band, the name represents positive vibrations and to them means that it is "West London's turn to shut down the scene". Akelle and Haile are cousins who know Louis, a former footballer who last played for Staines Town F.C., through their inhabitance of West London.

Akelle is the brother of singer Angel and was part of a band with him. His three other siblings called the Charles Family, co-managed by the late reggae singer Smiley Culture and Akelle's father, Tendai Charles, who was in the same reggae group as Haile's father. The group failed to achieve mainstream success despite being the subject of a BBC documentary One Life. Rei's father is Gary Beadle.

== Career ==
=== 2015–present: Formation and "In2" ===
Their debut single, "In2", was released on 20 July 2015 through Link Up TV and came together as a result of a jam session, instrumental first; Akelle and Haile had written a track and had asked Louis to feature on it. It was recorded in one of the group's first sessions and has appeared on the Radio 1Xtra and Kiss FM playlists. Two music videos were produced for the song – the first was pulled after the band signed to Atlantic Records, while the second was produced by Sally Sibbet, showing the group loitering across West London. Prior to the release of the latter video, Atlantic Records pulled down 43 unofficial YouTube and SoundCloud links before its submission.

On 30 October "In2" debuted at number 85 in the top 100 of the UK Singles Chart, and climbed to number 60 on 6 November, the day of its digital download release. For these two weeks, it charted on streams alone. Upon its digital release, it peaked at number 4 on 13 November 2015, earning the group its first top 40 and general chart entry.

On 2 December 2015 the trio released the song "Got Love", produced by Parallel (a collective made up of Akelle's brother, Angel, and PRGRSHN). The song was available to download for free when subscribing to their mailing list, and was also released via digital retailers on 4 December. The group expressed via Twitter that the song was not a single. According to Clash Music, the song is about "appreciating the simple things in life".

In July 2017, Akelle was sentenced to four and a half years in prison for violent disorder. In May 2024, he was sentenced to 6 years and 9 months for possession of a firearm and ammunition.

== Discography ==
=== Studio albums ===
Title	Mixtape details	Peak chart positions
Title	Mixtape details	UK
DOU3LE 3AK	Released: 12 October 2018; Label: Atlantic; Formats: Streaming, digital download	95

=== Mixtapes ===
Title	Mixtape details	Peak chart positions
Title	Mixtape details	UK
WSTRN Season	Released: 6 July 2016; Format: Free digital download	—
WSTRN Season, Vol. 2	Released: 30 August 2019; Label: Atlantic; Formats: Streaming, digital download	82
WSTRN Season 3	Released: 8 September 2022; Label: Empire; Formats: Streaming, digital download	—

=== Singles ===
==== As lead artist ====
Title	Year	Peak chart positions			Certifications	Album
Title	Year	UK	UK R&B	AUS	Certifications	Album
"In2"	2015	4	1	10	BPI: 2× Platinum; ARIA: 2× Platinum	Non-album singles
"Come Down"	2016	89	—	—		Non-album singles
"A-List"	2016	74	—	—		Non-album singles
"Trap Love" (featuring Fekky)	2016	—	—	—		Non-album singles
"On the Go"	2017	—	—	—		Non-album singles
"Social" (featuring MoStack)	2017	—	—	—		Non-album singles
"Txtin'" (featuring Alkaline)	2017	—	—	—	BPI: Silver	Non-album singles
"Ben' Ova"	2017	—	—	—		DOU3LE 3AK
"Love Struck" (featuring Tiwa Savage and Mr Eazi)	2018	—	—	—		DOU3LE 3AK
"Sharna"	2018	—	—	—		DOU3LE 3AK
"Round Here" (featuring Skrapz)	2018	87	—	—		DOU3LE 3AK
"Medusa" (featuring Unknown T)	2019	—	—	—		WSTRN Season, Vol. 2
"Maggie & Stardawg"	2019	—	—	—		WSTRN Season, Vol. 2

=== As featured artist ===
Title	Year	Peak chart positions					Certifications	Album
Title	Year	UK	BEL (FL)	IRE	NZ	SWI	Certifications	Album
"Bridge over Troubled Water" (as part of Artists for Grenfell)	2017	1	26	25	— (Note: "Bridge over Troubled Water" did not enter the NZ Top 40 Singles Chart, but peaked at number four on the NZ Heatseeker Singles Chart.)	28		Non-album singles
"Vice Versa" (One Acen featuring WSTRN)	2018	—	—	—	—	—		Non-album singles

=== Promotional singles ===
Title	Year	Album
"Best Friend (Remix)" (featuring Youngs Teflon)	2015	Non-album singles
"Got Love"	2015	Non-album singles

=== Remixes ===
Title	Year	Artist
"Coming Home" (Parallel Remix featuring WSTRN)	2015	Sigma and Rita Ora
"Fine Wine" (Remix featuring WSTRN)	2017	Yxng Bane
"Fine Line" (Remix with WSTRN)	2018	Mabel
