= List of Official Audio Streaming Chart number ones of the 2020s =

Music chart in the United Kingdom

The Official Audio Streaming Chart (previously the Official Streaming Chart) is a music chart based on plays of songs through audio streaming services (including Spotify, Deezer, Google Play Music, Apple Music, Amazon Music and Tidal) in the United Kingdom. It features data from both premium and ad-supported services. It is compiled weekly by the Official Charts Company (OCC), and was initially published both on their official website OfficialCharts.com (Top 100), and in the magazine Music Week (Top 75).

== Number ones ==
Key
| No. | nth song to top the Official Audio Streaming Chart |
| re | Return of a song to number one |

| No. | Artist (Note: The artist, song, date of reaching number one and number of weeks at number one are those given by the OCC.) | Song | Record label (Note: The record labels are those given by the OCC.) | Reached number one (for the week ending) | Weeks at number one |
2020
| re | Tones and I | "Dance Monkey" | Bad Batch | 9 January 2020 | 3 |
| 93 | Eminem featuring Juice Wrld | "Godzilla" | Interscope | 30 January 2020 | 2 |
| 94 | Roddy Ricch | "The Box" | Atlantic | 13 February 2020 | 1 |
| 95 | The Weeknd | "Blinding Lights" | Republic | 20 February 2020 | 1 |
| 96 | Billie Eilish | "No Time to Die" | Interscope | 27 February 2020 | 1 |
| re | The Weeknd | "Blinding Lights" | Republic | 5 March 2020 | 12 |
| 97 | DaBaby featuring Roddy Ricch | "Rockstar" | Interscope | 28 May 2020 | 8 |
| 98 | Jawsh 685 & Jason Derulo | "Savage Love (Laxed – Siren Beat)" | RCA | 23 July 2020 | 1 |
| 99 | Joel Corry featuring MNEK | "Head & Heart" | Asylum/Perfect Havoc | 30 July 2020 | 5 |
| 100 | Cardi B featuring Megan Thee Stallion | "WAP" | Atlantic | 3 September 2020 | 3 |
| 101 | 24kGoldn featuring Iann Dior | "Mood" | Black Butter | 24 September 2020 | 6 |
| 102 | Ariana Grande | "Positions" | Republic | 5 November 2020 | 5 |
| re | Mariah Carey | "All I Want for Christmas Is You" | Columbia | 10 December 2020 | 5 |
2021
| re | 24kGoldn featuring Iann Dior | "Mood" | Black Butter | 14 January 2021 | 1 |
| 103 | Olivia Rodrigo | "Drivers License" | Interscope | 21 January 2021 | 5 |
| 104 | Lil Tjay and 6lack | "Calling My Phone" | Columbia | 25 February 2021 | 1 |
| re | Olivia Rodrigo | "Drivers License" | Interscope | 4 March 2021 | 3 |
| 105 | A1 x J1 | "Latest Trends" | EMI | 25 March 2021 | 1 |
| 106 | Nathan Evans, 220 Kid and Billen Ted | "Wellerman" | Polydor | 1 April 2021 | 1 |
| re | A1 x J1 | "Latest Trends" | EMI | 8 April 2021 | 1 |
| 107 | Lil Nas X | "Montero (Call Me by Your Name)" | Lil Nas X | 15 April 2021 | 4 |
| 108 | Tion Wayne and Russ Millions | "Body" | Atlantic | 13 May 2021 | 3 |
| 109 | Olivia Rodrigo | "Good 4 U" | Geffen | 3 June 2021 | 6 |
| 110 | Ed Sheeran | "Bad Habits" | Asylum | 15 July 2021 | 13 |
| 110 | Ed Sheeran | "Shivers" | Asylum | 14 October 2021 | 2 |
| 111 | Adele | "Easy on Me" | Columbia | 28 October 2021 | 7 |
| re | Wham! | "Last Christmas" | RCA | 16 December 2021 | 4 |
2022
| re | Ed Sheeran | "Shivers" | Asylum | 13 January 2022 | 1 |
| 112 | Gayle | "ABCDEFU" | Atlantic | 20 January 2022 | 2 |
| 113 | Adassa, Stephanie Beatriz, Mauro Castillo, Rhenzy Feliz, Carolina Gaitán and Diane Guerrero | "We Don't Talk About Bruno" | Walt Disney | 3 February 2022 | 6 |
| 114 | Dave | "Starlight" | Neighbourhood Recordings | 17 March 2022 | 4 |
| 115 | Harry Styles | "As It Was" | Columbia | 14 April 2022 | 9 |
| 116 | Kate Bush | "Running Up That Hill" | Fish People | 16 June 2022 | 6 |
| 117 | LF System | "Afraid to Feel" | Warner | 28 July 2022 | 1 |
| re | Kate Bush | "Running Up That Hill" | Fish People | 4 August 2022 | 1 |
| re | LF System | "Afraid to Feel" | Warner | 11 August 2022 | 4 |
| 118 | Eliza Rose and Interplanetary Criminal | "B.O.T.A. (Baddest of Them All)" | Warner | 8 September 2022 | 4 |
| 119 | Sam Smith and Kim Petras | "Unholy" | EMI | 6 October 2022 | 4 |
| 120 | Taylor Swift | "Anti-Hero" | EMI | 3 November 2022 | 5 |
| re | Mariah Carey | "All I Want for Christmas Is You" | Columbia | 8 December 2022 | 2 |
| re | Wham! | "Last Christmas" | RCA | 22 December 2022 | 3 |
2023
| 121 | Raye featuring 070 Shake | "Escapism" | Human Re Sources | 12 January 2023 | 2 |
| 122 | Miley Cyrus | "Flowers" | Columbia | 26 January 2023 | 6 |
| 123 | PinkPantheress | "Boy's a Liar" | Warner | 9 March 2023 | 5 |
| 124 | Calvin Harris and Ellie Goulding | "Miracle" | Columbia | 7 April 2023 | 3 |
| 125 | David Kushner | "Daylight" | Miserable Music | 4 May 2023 | 3 |
| re | Calvin Harris and Ellie Goulding | "Miracle" | Columbia | 25 May 2023 | 3 |
| 126 | Dave and Central Cee | "Sprinter" | Live Yours/Neighbourhood | 15 June 2023 | 13 |
| 127 | Doja Cat | "Paint the Town Red" | RCA | 14 September 2023 | 6 |
| 128 | Kenya Grace | "Strangers" | FFRR | 26 October 2023 | 2 |
| 129 | Taylor Swift | "Is It Over Now?" | EMI | 9 November 2023 | 1 |
| 130 | Cassö, Raye and D-Block Europe | "Prada" | Ministry of Sound | 16 November 2023 | 1 |
| 131 | Jack Harlow | "Lovin On Me" | Atlantic | 23 November 2023 | 2 |
| re | Wham! | "Last Christmas" | RCA | 7 December 2023 | 5 |
2024
| 132 | Noah Kahan | "Stick Season" | Republic | 11 January 2024 | 12 |
| 133 | Benson Boone | "Beautiful Things" | Warner | 4 April 2024 | 1 |
| 134 | Beyoncé | "Texas Hold 'Em" | Parkwood Entertainment/Columbia | 11 April 2024 | 1 |
| 135 | Hozier | "Too Sweet" | Island | 18 April 2024 | 2 |
| 136 | Taylor Swift featuring Post Malone | "Fortnight" | EMI | 2 May 2024 | 1 |
| 137 | Sabrina Carpenter | "Espresso" | Island | 9 May 2024 | 5 |
| 138 | Eminem | "Houdini" | Interscope | 13 June 2024 | 2 |
| 139 | Sabrina Carpenter | "Please Please Please" | Island | 27 June 2024 | 2 |
| re | Sabrina Carpenter | "Espresso" | Island | 11 July 2024 | 5 |
| 140 | Charli XCX featuring Billie Eilish | "Guess" | Atlantic | 15 August 2024 | 1 |
| 141 | Chase & Status and Stormzy | "Backbone" | 0207/EMI/Merky | 22 August 2024 | 2 |
| 142 | Sabrina Carpenter | "Taste" | Island | 5 September 2024 | 9 |
| 143 | Gigi Perez | "Sailor Song" | Gigi Perez | 7 November 2024 | 2 |
| 144 | Gracie Abrams | "That's So True" | Interscope | 21 November 2024 | 3 |
| re | Wham! | "Last Christmas" | RCA | 12 December 2024 | 4 |
2025
| re | Gracie Abrams | "That's So True" | Interscope | 9 January 2025 | 4 |
| 145 | Lola Young | "Messy" | Island | 6 February 2025 | 3 |
| 146 | Kendrick Lamar | "Not Like Us" | Interscope | 27 February 2025 | 1 |
| re | Lola Young | "Messy" | Island | 6 March 2025 | 3 |
| 147 | Alex Warren | "Ordinary" | Atlantic | 27 March 2025 | 20 |
| 148 | Chappell Roan | "The Subway" | Island | 14 August 2025 | 1 |
| 149 | Huntrix | "Golden" | K-Pop Demon Hunters | 21 August 2025 | 7 |
| 150 | Olivia Dean | "Man I Need" | Polydor | 9 October 2025 | 1 |
| 151 | Taylor Swift | "The Fate of Ophelia" | Republic | 16 October 2025 | 3 |
| re | Huntrix | "Golden" | K-Pop Demon Hunters | 6 November 2025 | 2 |
| re | Olivia Dean | "Man I Need" | Polydor | 20 November 2025 | 3 |
| re | Wham! | "Last Christmas" | RCA | 11 December 2025 | 4 |
2026
| re | Olivia Dean | "Man I Need" | Polydor | 8 January 2026 | 3 |
| 152 | Dave and Tems | "Raindance" | Neighbourhood | 29 January 2026 | 1 |
| 153 | Harry Styles | "Aperture" | Columbia | 5 February 2026 | 1 |
| re | Olivia Dean | "Man I Need" | Polydor | 12 February 2026 | 5 |
| 154 | Bella Kay | "Iloveitiloveitiloveit" | Bella Kay | 19 March 2026 | 2 |
| 155 | Sam Fender and Olivia Dean | "Rein Me In" | Polydor | 2 April 2026 | 4 |
| 156 | Olivia Rodrigo | "Drop Dead" | Geffen | 30 April 2026 | 1 |
| re | Sam Fender and Olivia Dean | "Rein Me In" | Polydor | 7 May 2026 | 7 |
| 157 | Olivia Rodrigo | "Stupid Song" | Geffen | 25 June 2026 | 1 |
| re | Olivia Dean | "Man I Need" | Polydor | 2 July 2026 | 3 |
| re | Sam Fender and Olivia Dean | "Rein Me In" | Polydor | 23 July 2026 | 11 |
| 158 | Taylor Swift | "Patient Zero" | EMI | 8 October 2026 | 1 |
| re | Sam Fender and Olivia Dean | "Rein Me In" | Polydor | 15 October 2026 | 2 |
| 159 | Tate McRae | "Housewife" | RCA | 29 October 2026 | 1 |
| 160 | Jamie Miller | "Babydoll" | Republic | 5 November 2026 | 3 |

== See also ==
- List of Official Subscription Plays Chart number ones
