= M24 (rapper) =

British rapper (born 1998)

- Born: Dorai Harrison; 1 September 1998 (age 27)
- Origin: Brixton, London, England
- Genres: British hip hop; UK drill
- Occupations: Rapper; songwriter
- Years active: 2016–present
- Member of: AD/150

Dorai Harrison (born 1 September 1998), known professionally as M24, is a British rapper. He began his musical career in 2016, releasing his debut mixtape, Drip N Drill, in 2020.

== Career ==
M24 began his musical career in 2016. In 2017, he released "Do It & Crash" alongside Skengdo & AM, which gained 2.5 million views on YouTube.

In 2019, M24 released his breakout single "We Don't Dance", which featured Stickz. The song resulted in M24 being able collaborate with larger UK artists. In 2020, he would announce that his debut mixtape, Drip 'N' Drill, was to be released in August the same year; the mixtape included features from Pop Smoke and Sneakbo. The mixtape was released on 21 August 2020 and peaked at number 81 on the UK Albums Chart.

In 2020, M24 released "London", which featured Tion Wayne; the song peaked at number 32 on the UK Singles Chart and was certified silver by the British Phonographic Industry. He was also featured on "Dumpa" by Ill Blu alongside Unknown T, which peaked at number 70.

In 2021, M24 released a remix of "No Cap" alongside Pop Smoke, which appeared on the soundtrack for Boogie. He was also featured on "Payslips" by Swarmz alongside Bugzy Malone, which peaked at number 76.

In 2022, M24 released "Knock Knock" with Tion Wayne, which peaked at number 21. A remix to the song was released in March, featuring HAZEY, Sneakbo, MIST, Jordan and Trillz CB.

== Legal issues ==
On 1 September 2021, M24 was arrested for being in possession of a knife. He was sentenced to six months in prison on 24 September. In addition, he was given a Knife Crime Prevention Order (KCPO) that banned him from inciting violence on social media and from entering portions of his neighbourhood. He was released in December after serving three months.

== Discography ==
=== Mixtapes ===
List of mixtapes, with selected details
Title	Details	Peak chart positions
Title	Details	UK
Drip N Drill	Released: 21 August 2020; Label: Big Business Entertainment	81

=== Singles ===
==== As lead artist ====
Title	Year	Peak chart positions	Certifications	Album
Title	Year	UK	Certifications	Album
"Do It & Crash" (featuring Skengdo & AM)	2017	—		Non-album singles
"Lightwork Freestyle"	2018	–		Non-album singles
"Unruly Killy"	2018	–		Non-album singles
"We Don't Dance" (with Stickz)	2019	–	BPI: Silver	Non-album singles
"Verbal"	2019	–		Non-album singles
"Ay Caramba"	2019	–		Non-album singles
"OBBO Is Real"	2019	–		Non-album singles
"Riding" (with Tookie)	2019	–		Non-album singles
"Dance with Smoke"	2019	–		Non-album singles
"London" (featuring Tion Wayne)	2020	32	BPI: Silver	Non-album singles
"No Cap"	2020	–		Non-album singles
"Peter Pan"	2020	–		Non-album singles
"A Town Matters" (featuring Tookie, M Dargg, Stickz and Sneakbo)	2020	–		Drip N Drill
"Nikeys"	2020	–		Non-album singles
"Too Much Pride"	2020	–		Non-album singles
"IS IT"	2020	–		Non-album singles
"High Right Now"	2021	–		Non-album singles
"Plugged In" (with Fumez the Engineer)	2021	–		Non-album singles
"Back in Blood"	2021	–		Non-album singles
"N.F.T.R"	2021	–		Non-album singles
"Exotic"	2021	–		Non-album singles
"Knock Knock" (with Tion Wayne)	2022	21		TBA
"Plugged In" (with Fumez the Engineer)	2022	–		Non-album singles
"John Wick"	2022	–		Non-album singles
"Coulda Been"	2022	–		Non-album singles
"Daily Duppy"	2022	–		Non-album singles
"—" denotes a recording that did not chart or was not released in that territory.

==== As featured artist ====
Title	Year	Peak chart positions	Album
Title	Year	UK	Album
"Smokey Things" (Skeamer featuring M24, Mayhem and Young Dizz)	2018	–	Non-album singles
"Warr" (150 featuring M24 and Slapit24)	2018	–	Non-album singles
"The Coldest Link Up" (Tweeko & Sebz Beats featuring Skengdo & AM, Burner, M24, 12World, 23 Drillas & Lowkey)	2018	–	Non-album singles
"Get Back" (150 featuring M24, Stickz, Grizzy and M Dargg)	2019	–	Non-album singles
"Trenches" (150 featuring M24, Stickz, Grizzy, J Boy, Slapit24 and K Chuks)	2019	–	Non-album singles
"Luke Cage" (150 featuring M24 and Stickz)	2019	–	Non-album singles
"Crash x GBG" (410 featuring M24, Stickz, Skengdo & AM)	2019	–	Back Like We Never Left
"Bootings" (150 featuring M24, Grizzy, Slapit24 and Stickz)	2019	–	Non-album singles
"Loads of Drills" (Burner featuring M24)	2019	–	Non-album singles
"Handsome" (Yungen featuring M24)	2020	–	Non-album singles
"Dumpa" (Ill Blu featuring M24 and Unknown T)	2020	70	The BLUPRiNT
"Buss It" (Vigiland featuring M24)	2020	–	Non-album single
"Xabsi" (Rimzee featuring M24)	2020	–	Upper Clapton Dream 2
"Gulag" (Morrisson featuring M24)	2020	–	Non-album singles
"100X" (Stardom featuring M24)	2020	–	Non-album singles
"The Old Estate" (Pete & Bas featuring M24)	2020	–	Non-album singles
"Fashion" (The Plug featuring M24 and Fivio Foreign)	2021	–	Plug Talk 2
"Hugo Boss" (Burner featuring M24)	2021	–	Non-album singles
"Payslips" (Swarmz featuring M24 and Bugzy Malone)	2021	76	Non-album singles
"Dinners and Factions" (NVSA featuring M24)	2021	–	Non-album singles
"Antiuga" (Dappy featuring M24 and BackRoad Gee)	2021	–	Fortune
"—" denotes a recording that did not chart or was not released in that territory.

=== Guest appearances ===
List of non-single guest appearances, with other performing artists
Title	Year	Other artist(s)	Album
"Finished"	2019	WordPlay	From da Streets... To the World
"Maddest of the Maddest (Remix)"	2019	Burner, Tiny Boost, Onefour, AM	Non-single remix
"Peter Crouch"	2020	GRM Daily	GRM 10
"Demon Time (Remix)"	2020	Sai So	Non-single remixes
"No Cap (Remix)"	2021	Pop Smoke	Boogie: The Original Motion Picture Soundtrack
"Hmm (UK Remix)"	2021	G4 Boyz	Non-single remix
"To The Moon (Drill Remix)"	2022	Jnr Choi, G Herbo, Fivio Foreign, Russ Millions, Sam Tompkins	Non-single remix

== Filmography ==
=== Television ===
Year	Title	Role	Notes	Ref.
2022	Jungle	6IX	4 Episodes	
