= List of UK top-ten singles in 2020 =

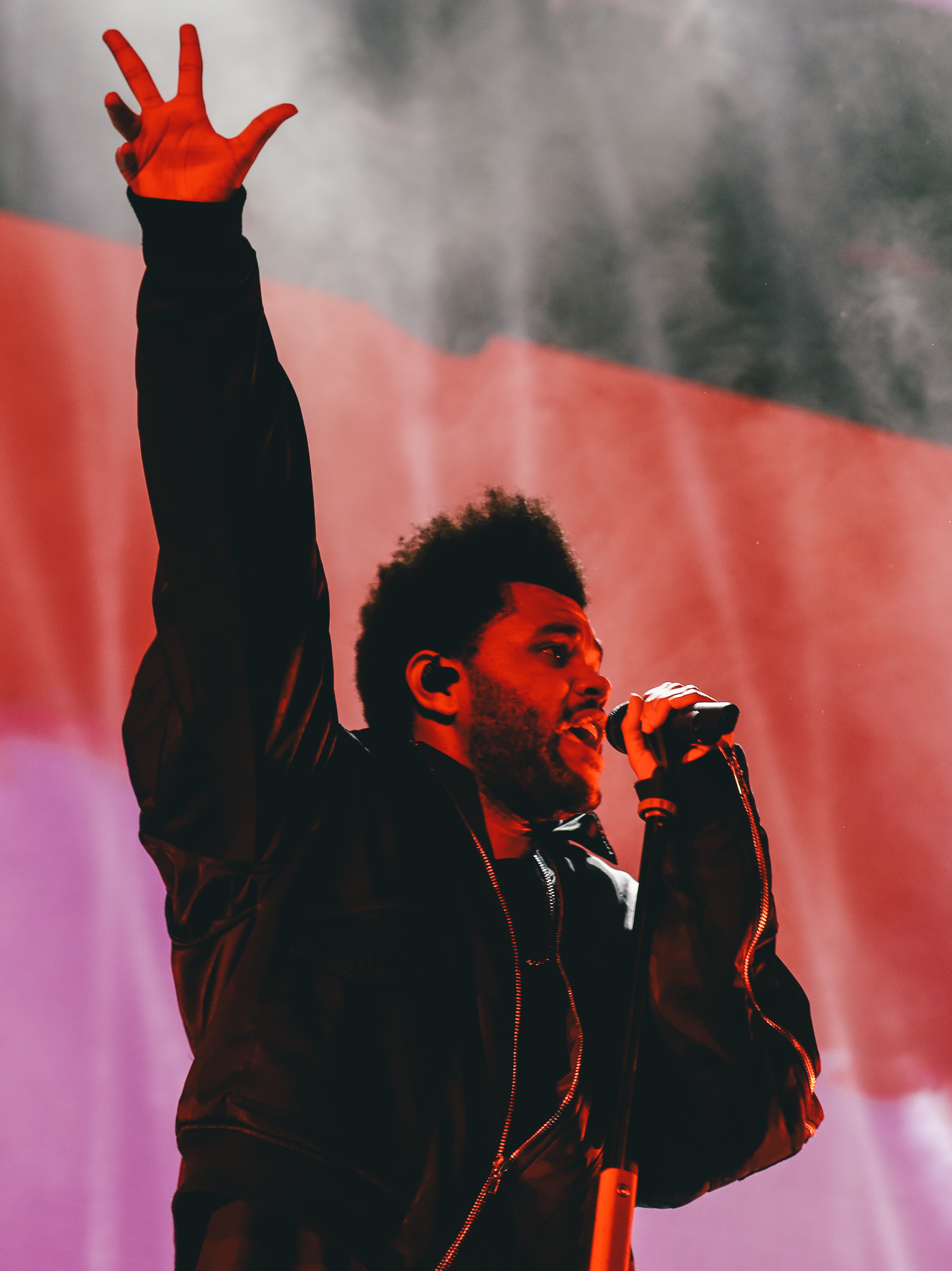
Canadian singer The Weeknd had the best-selling single of 2020 with "Blinding Lights", which spent eight non-consecutive weeks at number-one and lasted 22 non-consecutive weeks in the top 10.

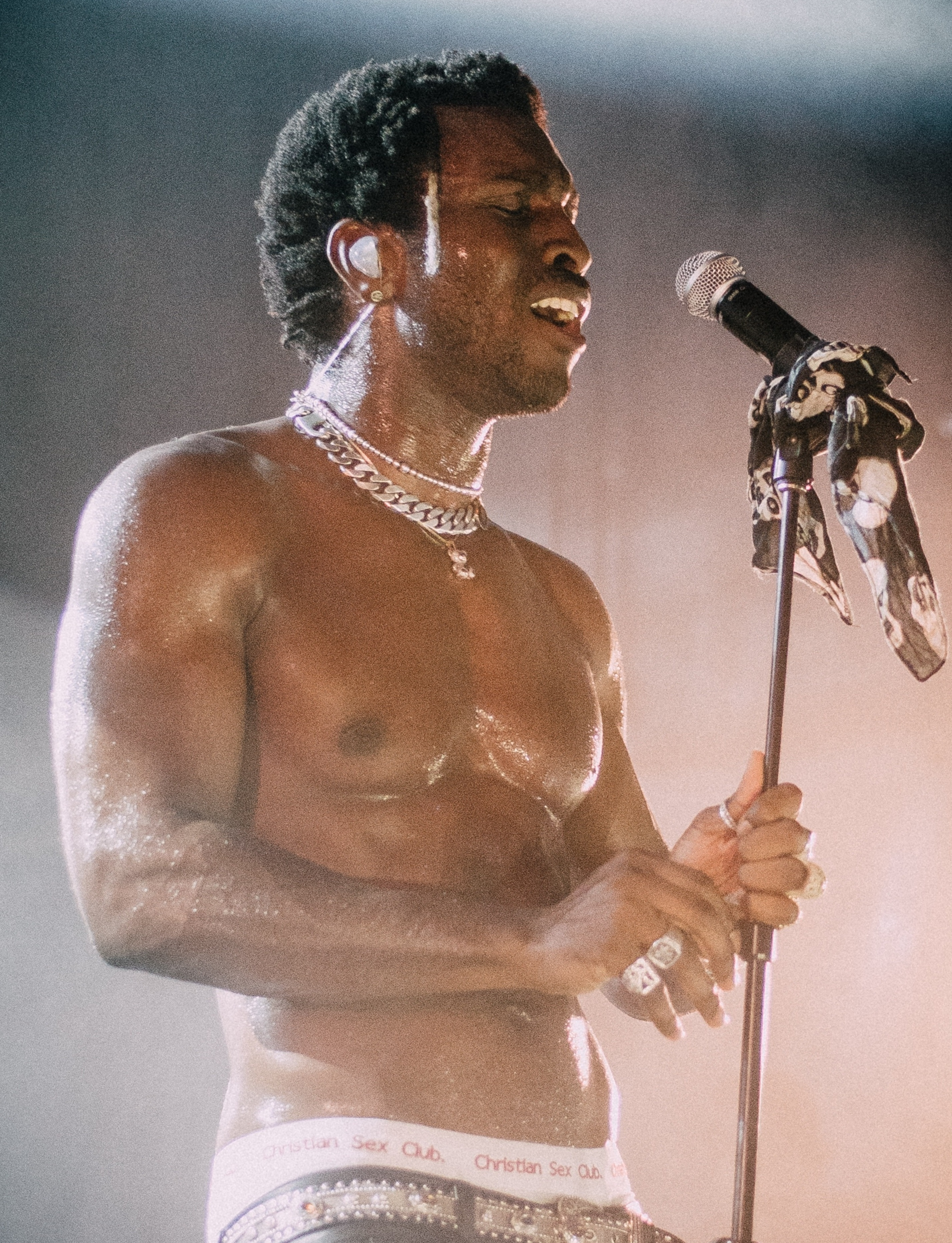
Guyanese-American rapper Saint Jhn scored his only major hit single this year with "Roses". It spent two weeks at number-one and remained in the top 10 for 12 weeks, eventually becoming the third best selling single of the year.

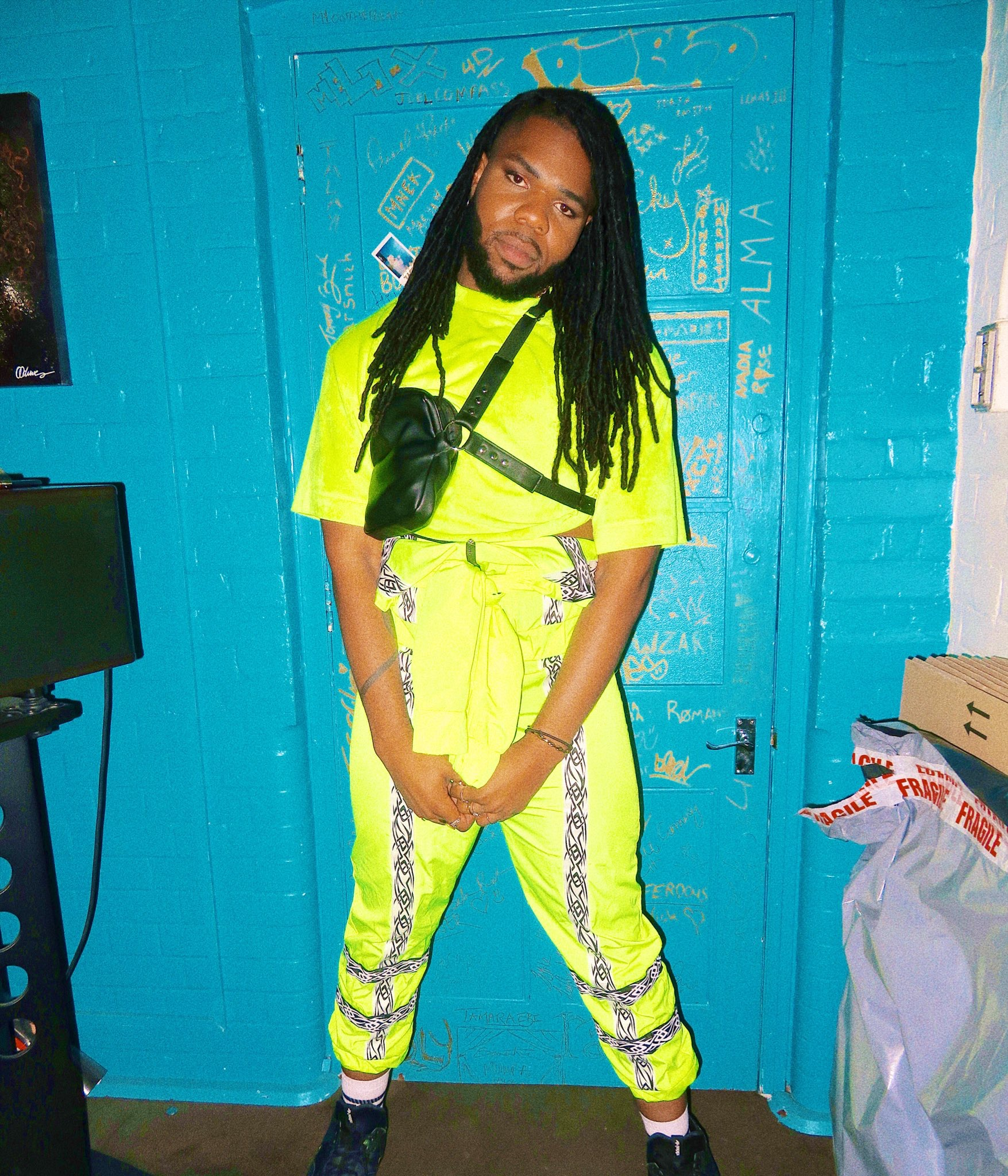
MNEK provided vocals on Joel Corry's "Head & Heart", which reached number-one in the UK in July 2020 and spent six weeks at the top spot. It went on to become the year's fifth best selling single.

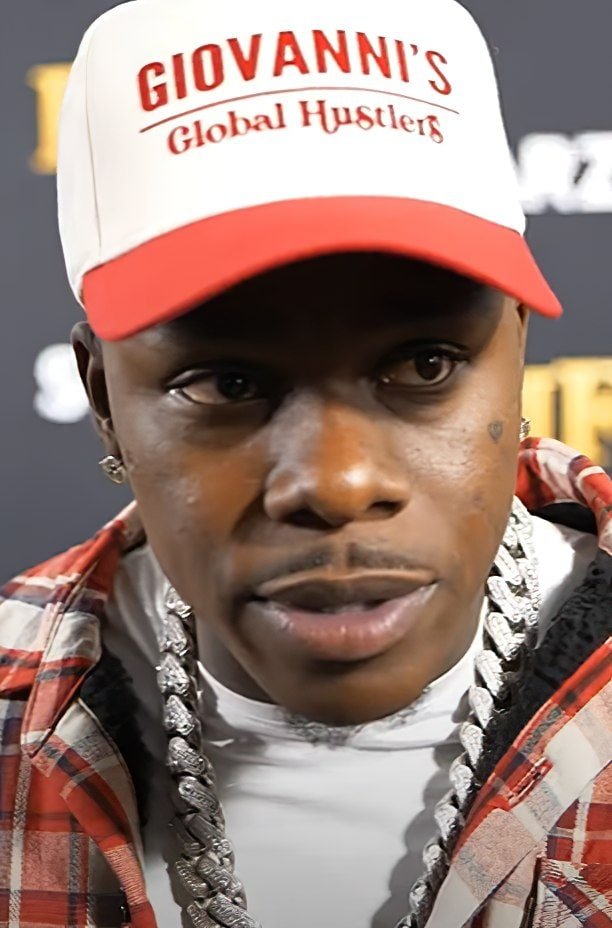
DaBaby spent six non-consecutive weeks at number-one in the UK charts with "Rockstar", a collaboration with Roddy Ricch, which became the seventh best selling single of this year.

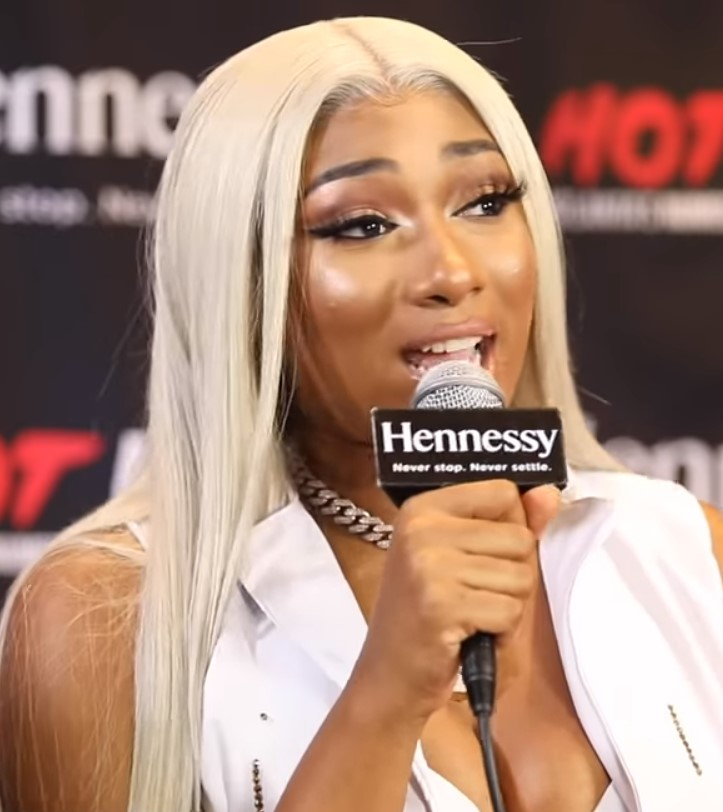
Megan Thee Stallion made her UK top 10 debut in 2020 with two singles making the countdown, including her collaboration with Cardi B, "WAP", which spent three weeks at number-one. "WAP" was the first female rap collaboration to reach number-one in the UK charts.

The UK Singles Chart is one of many music charts compiled by the Official Charts Company that calculates the best-selling singles of the week in the United Kingdom. Since 2004 the chart has been based on the sales of physical singles and digital downloads, with airplay figures excluded from the official chart. Since 2014, the singles chart has been based on sales and streaming, with the ratio altered in 2017 to 150:1 stream and only three singles by the same artist eligible for the chart. From July 2018, video streams from YouTube Music and Spotify among others began to be counted for the Official Charts. This list shows singles that peaked in the Top 10 of the UK Singles Chart during 2020, and singles that peaked in 2019 and 2021 but were in the top 10 in 2020. The entry date is when the song appeared in the top 10 for the first time (week ending, as published by the Official Charts Company, which is six days after the chart is announced).

One-hundred and two singles were in the top 10 this year. Eleven singles from 2019 remained in the top 10 for several weeks at the beginning of the year, while "Sweet Melody" by Little Mix, "34+35" by Ariana Grande, "This Christmas" by Jess Glynne, "Whoopty" by CJ and "Rockin' Around the Christmas Tree" by Justin Bieber were all released in 2020 but did not reach their peak until 2021. "All I Want for Christmas is You" by Mariah Carey, "Before You Go" by Lewis Capaldi, Own It by Stormzy featuring Ed Sheeran and Burna Boy, "River" by Ellie Goulding and "Roxanne" by Arizona Zervas were the singles from 2019 to reach their peak in 2020. "Last Christmas" by Wham! was released in 2019 and re-entered the top 10 in 2020, but did not reach its peak until 2021. Twenty-two artists have scored multiple entries in the top ten in 2020. DaBaby, Doja Cat, Future, Tate McRae, Megan Thee Stallion and Roddy Ricch are among the many artists who achieved their first top 10 single in 2020.

The first number-one single of the year was "River" by Ellie Goulding. Overall, eighteen different songs peaked at number-one in 2020, with Ariana Grande (2) having the most songs hit that position.

== Background ==
=== Multiple entries ===
Sixty-one singles have charted in the top 10 so far in 2020 (as of 16 July 2020, week ending), with fifty-six singles reaching their peak this year (including the re-entries "All I Want for Christmas Is You", "Do They Know It's Christmas?", "Fairytale of New York", "Happy Xmas (War is Over)", "I Wish It Could Be Christmas Everyday", "Last Christmas", "Merry Christmas Everyone" and "Step into Christmas", which charted in previous years but reached peaks on their latest chart run).

Sixteen artists have scored multiple entries in the top 10 so far in 2020, with Dua Lipa and AJ Tracey sharing the record (as of 16 July 2020, week ending) for most hit singles this year with four, both including a feature on the charity single "Times Like These" with the Live Lounge Allstars.

=== Captain Tom Moore breaks records ===
The COVID-19 pandemic in the United Kingdom led to several charity singles being released to raise money to support people fighting the disaster, among these Matt Lucas' "Thank You Baked Potato" and a new version of "We'll Meet Again" by Vera Lynn and Katherine Jenkins. Neither of these singles reached the official top 10, but one single did make a massive mark on the UK charts. Captain Tom Moore teamed up with Michael Ball and the NHS Voices of Hope Choir to cover "You'll Never Walk Alone", the single reaching the top spot on 25 March 2020. Captain Tom had already become a national hero, on top of his time serving the country in the Second World War, after raising more than £28 million for NHS Charities Together through walking 100 laps of his garden during the nationwide lockdown, ahead of his 100th birthday on 30 April. He was also awarded a Pride of Britain Award the day before he reached number-one.

The single led the Official Chart Update but by 23 April, the day before the chart was revealed, its closest competitor – "Blinding Lights" by The Weeknd – was catching up. However The Weeknd publicly backed "You'll Never Walk Alone" for number-one, encouraging the public to buy and stream it instead of "Blinding Lights" to give the single a final boost.

Captain Tom became the oldest person to have a number-one single on the UK Singles Chart in the sixty-eight years since it launched in 1952, at the age of 99 years and 11 months, while his co-performer Michael Ball also entered the record books as the eighth oldest (57 years and 9 months). Moore also became the first centenarian to celebrate a chart-topping single, as he was still at number-one on the day of his 100th birthday. The song itself was the fastest selling single since LadBaby's "I Love Sausage Rolls" in 2019, scoring 80,000 downloads in a week.

"You'll Never Walk Alone" also joined a list of only two other songs which have reached number-one with four different versions - "Unchained Melody" and "Do They Know It's Christmas?" are the other songs which have topped the chart on 4 occasions under four separate iterations. Gerry and the Pacemakers" (1963), The Crowd (1985) and Robson & Jerome (1996) were the previous artists to reach number-one with this song.

=== Taylor Swift makes chart history ===
American singer Taylor Swift made chart history this year by becoming the first female artist to have three singles debut in the top 10 of the UK Singles Chart in the same week (6 August 2020, week ending); "Cardigan" (6), "Exile" (8) and "The 1" (10). All three songs were taken from her album Folklore, which topped the UK Albums Chart. Swift went on to achieve another top 10 single, "Willow" (3) in December 2020 following the surprise release of her ninth studio album Evermore.

=== "All I Want for Christmas Is You" finally reaches number-one ===
26 years after its initial release, Mariah Carey's festive classic "All I Want for Christmas Is You" finally reached number-one in the UK Singles Chart on 17 December 2020 (week ending). Upon its initial release in December 1994, the song spent three weeks at number 2, held off the top spot by East 17's "Stay Another Day". The song returned to the runner-up spot three more times; in 2017, in 2018 and in 2019. The song also set a new UK chart record, reaching number-one in its seventieth week in the top 40; no other song in UK chart history has spent more weeks in the top 40 before reaching number-one. It held the top spot for a second week before being denied the UK's Christmas number-one single for 2020 by LadBaby's "Don't Stop Me Eatin'".

=== LadBaby gets third Christmas number-one ===
LadBaby returned for a third time with a parody song about sausage rolls, once again raising money for the Trussell Trust foodbank charity. His song "Don't Stop Me Eatin' - a take on "Don't Stop Believin'" by Journey - hit the top spot at Christmas, giving him a third successive Christmas number-one.

The single was a follow-up to his chart toppers "We Built This City" (2018) and "I Love Sausage Rolls" (2019) and also saw the duo (real name Mark and Roxanne Hoyle) match the record of the Beatles and Spice Girls as the only acts with three Christmas number-one singles.

=== Chart debuts ===
Forty-two artists achieved their first charting top 10 single in 2020, either as a lead or featured artist. Of these, three went on to record another hit single that year: 24kGoldn, BTS and Megan Thee Stallion. Pop Smoke and Roddy Ricch both achieved two more chart hits in their breakthrough year.

The following table (collapsed on desktop site) does not include acts who had previously charted as part of a group and secured their first top 10 solo single.

Artist	Number of top 10s	First entry	Chart position	Other entries
Roddy Ricch	3	"The Box"	2	"Rockstar" (1), "The Woo" (9)
Pop Smoke	3	"The Woo"	9	"Mood Swings" (8), "What You Know Bout Love" (4)
Megan Thee Stallion	2	"Savage"	3	"WAP" (1)
24kGoldn	2	"Mood"	1	"Tick Tock" (8)
BTS	2	"Dynamite"	3	"Life Goes On" (10)
Endor	1	"Pump It Up"	8	—
Future	1	"Life Is Good"	3	—
DigDat	1	"Ei8ht Mile"	9	—
Saint Jhn	1	"Roses"	1	—
Doja Cat	1	"Say So"	2	—
Tay Keith	1	"Rain"	3	—
Powfu	1	"Death Bed (Coffee for Your Head)"	4	—
beabadoobee	1	"Death Bed (Coffee for Your Head)"	4	—
Lil Mosey	1	"Blueberry Faygo"	9	—
Captain Tom Moore	1	"You'll Never Walk Alone"	1	—
NHS Voices of Care Choir	1	"You'll Never Walk Alone"	1	—
Live Lounge Allstars	1	"Times Like These"	1	—
Celeste	1	"Times Like These"	1	—
Grace Carter	1	"Times Like These"	1	—
Royal Blood	1	"Times Like These"	1	—
Sam Fender	1	"Times Like These"	1	—
Yungblud	1	"Times Like These"	1	—
Swarmz	1	"Houdini"	6	—
DaBaby	1	"Rockstar"	1	—
S1mba	1	"Rover"	3	—
DTG	1	"Rover"	3	—
Givēon	1	"Chicago Freestyle"	10	—
Topic	1	"Breaking Me"	3	—
A7S	1	"Breaking Me"	3	—
Dutchavelli	1	"I Dunno"	7	—
220 Kid	1	"Don't Need Love"	9	—
Gracey	1	"Don't Need Love"	9	—
Jawsh 685	1	"Savage Love (Laxed – Siren Beat)"	1	—
Nathan Dawe	1	"Lighter"	4	—
Bon Iver	1	"Exile"	8	—
Lil Durk	1	"Laugh Now Cry Later"	4	—
Iann Dior	1	"Mood"	1	—
Paul Woolford	1	"Looking for Me"	4	—
Kareen Lomax	1	"Looking for Me"	4	—
Internet Money	1	"Lemonade"	1	—
Gunna	1	"Lemonade"	1	—
Don Toliver	1	"Lemonade"	1	—
Nav	1	"Lemonade"	1	—
Tate McRae	1	"You Broke Me First"	3	—
Wes Nelson	1	"See Nobody"	3	—
Hardy Caprio	1	"See Nobody"	3	—
CJ	1	"Whoopty"	3	—

Notes

The line-up of Live Lounge Allstars featured a selection of artists who had previously had a top-ten single as part of a group but did not have a solo credit to their name. This includes Ben Johnston, James Johnston and Simon Neil (Biffy Clyro), Dave Grohl (Nirvana and Foo Fighters), Taylor Hawkins (Foo Fighters) and Luke Hemmings (5 Seconds of Summer). Ben Thatcher and Mike Kerr, who make up the band Royal Blood, were also debutants to the upper-reaches of the chart, as Royal Blood's highest placing to date was "Figure It Out" which reached number 43 in 2014. Fraser T. Smith had also worked on numerous top 10 singles for different artists, including "Broken Strings" by James Morrison and Nelly Furtado (2008), but this is the first single where he is individually credited.

=== Songs from films ===
The only song from a film which entered the top 10 this year was "No Time to Die" (from No Time to Die). The film was initially scheduled to be released in November 2019, but, due to the departure of Danny Boyle as director and because of the COVID-19 pandemic, its release date was delayed several times. The film was eventually released in the UK on 30 September 2021.

=== Charity singles ===
A number of singles recorded for charity reached the top ten in the charts in 2020. Captain Tom Moore joined forces with Michael Ball and the NHS Voices of Care Choir to raise funds to support the NHS during the COVID-19 crisis. Their cover of "You'll Never Walk Alone" reached the top of the charts on the week ending 30 April 2020.

BBC Radio 1's Live Lounge organised a supergroup named Live Lounge Allstars to record "Times Like These" during the Coronavirus crisis, with the contributors including Rita Ora, Ellie Goulding, Chris Martin, Dua Lipa and Rag'n'Bone Man all singing their own parts from their homes due to social distancing. The single entered the chart at number 5 on the 24 April 2020 (week ending 30 April 2020), less than 12 hours after release. The following week, it reached number-one, becoming the first song produced by BBC Radio 1 to top the chart, and the first BBC release to peak at number-one since "Perfect Day" in 1997.

Following the success of "Times Like These", BBC Radio 2 organised its own supergroup, BBC Radio 2 Allstars to record "Stop Crying Your Heart Out" as the official single for that year's Children in Need appeal, with the contributors including Kylie Minogue, Bryan Adams, Cher, Jess Glynne and Robbie Williams all singing their parts from their own homes due to social distancing. The single entered the chart at number 7 on 20 November 2020 (week ending 26 November 2020).

=== Best-selling singles ===
The Weeknd had the best-selling single of the year with "Blinding Lights". The song spent 22 weeks in the top 10 (including eight weeks at number-one), sold over 1,800,000 copies and was certified 3× platinum by the BPI. "Dance Monkey" by Tones & I came in second place, while Saint Jhn's "Roses", "Before You Go" by Lewis Capaldi and "Head & Heart" by Joel Corry featuring MNEK made up the top five. Songs by Dua Lipa, DaBaby featuring Roddy Ricch, Lewis Capaldi ("Someone You Loved"), Stormzy featuring Ed Sheeran and Burna Boy and Harry Styles were also in the top ten best-selling singles of the year.

== Top-ten singles ==
Key

Symbol	Meaning
‡	Single peaked in 2019 but still in chart in 2020.
♦	Single released in 2019 or 2020 but peaked in 2021.
(#)	Year-end top-ten single position and rank
Entered	The date that the single first appeared in the chart.
Peak	Highest position that the single reached in the UK Singles Chart.

Entered (week ending)	Weeks in top 10	Single	Artist	Peak	Peak reached (week ending)	Weeks at peak
Singles in 2019
7 February 2019	31	"Someone You Loved" ‡ (#8) ^{[R]}	Lewis Capaldi	1	7 March 2019	7
3 October 2019	16	"Dance Monkey" ‡ (#2) ^{[L]}	Tones and I	1	10 October 2019	11
7 November 2019	5	"Lose You to Love Me" ‡ ^{[M]}	Selena Gomez	3	7 November 2019	1
14 November 2019	25	"Don't Start Now" ‡ (#6) ^{[N]}	Dua Lipa	2	14 November 2019	3
28 November 2019	10	"Everything I Wanted" ‡ ^{[P]}^{[S]}	Billie Eilish	3	28 November 2019	1
28 November 2019	11	"Roxanne" ^{[P]}	Arizona Zervas	4	9 January 2020	2
5 December 2019	12	"Before You Go" (#4) ^{[Q]}	Lewis Capaldi	1	6 February 2020	1
5 December 2019	10	"Own It" (#9)	Stormzy featuring Ed Sheeran & Burna Boy	1	9 January 2020	3
12 December 2019	9	"All I Want for Christmas Is You" ^{[A]}^{[RR]}^{[VV]}	Mariah Carey	1	17 December 2020	3
19 December 2019	2	"River" ^{[B]}	Ellie Goulding	1	2 January 2020	1
19 December 2019	8	"Last Christmas" ♦^{[C]}^{[SS]}^{[BBB]}	Wham!	1	7 January 2021	1
Singles in 2020
2 January 2020	6	"Fairytale of New York" ^{[D]}^{[TT]}	The Pogues featuring Kirsty MacColl	4	2 January 2020	2
2 January 2020	5	"Merry Christmas Everyone" ^{[E]}^{[WW]}	Shakin' Stevens	6	2 January 2020	3
2 January 2020	5	"Do They Know It's Christmas?" ^{[F]}^{[G]}^{[YY]}	Band Aid	7	2 January 2020	3
2 January 2020	4	"Step into Christmas" ^{[H]}^{[ZZ]}^{[AAA]}	Elton John	8	2 January 2020	2
2 January 2020	1	"Happy Xmas (War Is Over)"	John Legend	9	2 January 2020	1
2 January 2020	1	"I Wish It Could Be Christmas Everyday" ^{[I]}	Wizzard	10	2 January 2020	1
9 January 2020	5	"Adore You" ^{[T]}^{[U]}	Harry Styles	7	9 January 2020	1
9 January 2020	1	"Pump It Up"	Endor	8	9 January 2020	1
9 January 2020	1	"This Is Real"	Jax Jones featuring Ella Henderson	9	9 January 2020	1
16 January 2020	2	"Yummy"	Justin Bieber	5	16 January 2020	1
16 January 2020	22	"Blinding Lights" (#1) ^{[BB]}	The Weeknd	1	13 February 2020	8
23 January 2020	7	"Life Is Good"	Future featuring Drake	3	23 January 2020	1
23 January 2020	11	"The Box"	Roddy Ricch	2	30 January 2020	3
30 January 2020	6	"Godzilla" ^{[V]}	Eminem featuring Juice Wrld	1	30 January 2020	1
30 January 2020	1	"Ei8ht Mile"	DigDat featuring Aitch	9	30 January 2020	1
20 February 2020	12	"Roses" (#3)	Saint Jhn	1	26 March 2020	2
27 February 2020	4	"No Time to Die"	Billie Eilish	1	27 February 2020	1
27 February 2020	6	"Intentions" ^{[W]}	Justin Bieber featuring Quavo	8	9 April 2020	1
5 March 2020	10	"Lonely"	Joel Corry	4	2 April 2020	1
12 March 2020	1	"Stupid Love"	Lady Gaga	5	12 March 2020	1
12 March 2020	14	"Say So" ^{[Z]}	Doja Cat	2	14 May 2020	2
19 March 2020	3	"Rain"	Aitch & AJ Tracey featuring Tay Keith	3	19 March 2020	2
19 March 2020	8	"Physical"	Dua Lipa	3	9 April 2020	1
9 April 2020	3	"Break My Heart"	Dua Lipa	6	9 April 2020	1
9 April 2020	1	"Break Up Song"	Little Mix	9	9 April 2020	1
9 April 2020	2	"Boyfriend"	Mabel	10	9 April 2020	2
16 April 2020	11	"Toosie Slide"	Drake	1	14 May 2020	1
16 April 2020	10	"Death Bed (Coffee for Your Head)"	Powfu featuring Beabadoobee	4	14 May 2020	1
23 April 2020	1	"Blueberry Faygo"	Lil Mosey	9	23 April 2020	1
30 April 2020	1	"You'll Never Walk Alone"	Michael Ball, Captain Tom Moore & the NHS Voices of Care Choir	1	30 April 2020	1
30 April 2020	3	"Times Like These" ^{[X]}	Live Lounge Allstars	1	7 May 2020	1
7 May 2020	1	"Houdini"	KSI featuring Swarmz & Tion Wayne	6	7 May 2020	1
14 May 2020	9	"Savage" ^{[AA]}	Megan Thee Stallion	3	14 May 2020	1
14 May 2020	13	"Rockstar" (#7)	DaBaby featuring Roddy Ricch	1	21 May 2020	6
14 May 2020	10	"Rover"	S1mba featuring DTG	3	4 June 2020	4
14 May 2020	12	"Dinner Guest"	AJ Tracey featuring MoStack	5	25 June 2020	1
14 May 2020	1	"Chicago Freestyle"	Drake featuring Givēon	10	14 May 2020	1
21 May 2020	3	"Stuck with U"	Ariana Grande & Justin Bieber	4	21 May 2020	1
21 May 2020	2	"Gooba"	6ix9ine	6	21 May 2020	1
4 June 2020	9	"Rain on Me"	Lady Gaga & Ariana Grande	1	4 June 2020	1
11 June 2020	7	"Breaking Me"	Topic & A7S	3	2 July 2020	1
11 June 2020	2	"I Dunno"	Tion Wayne, Dutchavelli & Stormzy	7	11 June 2020	1
25 June 2020	8	"Secrets" ^{[II]}	Regard & Raye	6	13 August 2020	1
25 June 2020	3	"Don't Need Love"	220 Kid & Gracey	9	2 July 2020	2
2 July 2020	9	"Savage Love (Laxed – Siren Beat)"	Jawsh 685 & Jason Derulo	1	9 July 2020	3
2 July 2020	11	"Watermelon Sugar" (#10)	Harry Styles	4	13 August 2020	1
16 July 2020	9	"West Ten"	AJ Tracey & Mabel	5	13 August 2020	1
16 July 2020	1	"The Woo"	Pop Smoke featuring 50 Cent & Roddy Ricch	9	16 July 2020	1
23 July 2020	11	"Head & Heart" (#5)	Joel Corry featuring MNEK	1	30 July 2020	6
23 July 2020	1	"Come & Go"	Juice Wrld & Marshmello	9	23 July 2020	1
30 July 2020	7	"Greece" ^{[JJ]}	DJ Khaled & Drake	8	30 July 2020	2
30 July 2020	4	"Only You Freestyle"	Headie One & Drake	5	6 August 2020	1
6 August 2020	9	"Lighter"	Nathan Dawe featuring KSI	3	13 August 2020	3
6 August 2020	1	"Cardigan"	Taylor Swift	6	6 August 2020	1
6 August 2020	1	"Exile"	Taylor Swift featuring Bon Iver	8	6 August 2020	1
6 August 2020	1	"The 1"	Taylor Swift	10	6 August 2020	1
13 August 2020	1	"My Future"	Billie Eilish	7	13 August 2020	1
13 August 2020	2	"Go Crazy"	Chris Brown & Young Thug	10	13 August 2020	2
20 August 2020	9	"WAP"	Cardi B featuring Megan Thee Stallion	1	10 September 2020	3
20 August 2020	10	"Mood Swings"	Pop Smoke featuring Lil Tjay	5	17 September 2020	2
27 August 2020	5	"Laugh Now Cry Later"	Drake featuring Lil Durk	4	27 August 2020	1
3 September 2020	1	"Dynamite"	BTS	3	3 September 2020	1
3 September 2020	11	"Ain't It Different"	Headie One, AJ Tracey & Stormzy	2	22 October 2020	2
10 September 2020	8	"Mood"	24kGoldn featuring Iann Dior	1	1 October 2020	4
17 September 2020	6	"Looking for Me"	Paul Woolford & Diplo featuring Kareen Lomax	4	1 October 2020	3
17 September 2020	12	"Midnight Sky" ^{[LL]}	Miley Cyrus	5	29 October 2020	3
24 September 2020	5	"Take You Dancing"	Jason Derulo	7	1 October 2020	1
1 October 2020	9	"Lemonade"	Internet Money & Gunna featuring Don Toliver & Nav	1	29 October 2020	1
1 October 2020	7	"Holy" ^{[MM]}	Justin Bieber featuring Chance the Rapper	7	29 October 2020	1
8 October 2020	12	"You Broke Me First" ^{[HHH]}	Tate McRae	3	29 October 2020	1
15 October 2020	7	"What You Know Bout Love"	Pop Smoke	4	29 October 2020	1
29 October 2020	6	"See Nobody"	Wes Nelson & Hardy Caprio	3	12 November 2020	1
29 October 2020	1	"Tick Tock"	Clean Bandit, Mabel & 24kGoldn	8	29 October 2020	1
29 October 2020	1	"Lasting Lover"	Sigala & James Arthur	10	29 October 2020	1
5 November 2020	7	"Positions"	Ariana Grande	1	5 November 2020	6
5 November 2020	3	"Really Love"	KSI featuring Craig David & Digital Farm Animals	3	5 November 2020	1
5 November 2020	13	"Sweet Melody" ♦ ^{[NN]}^{[CCC]}	Little Mix	1	14 January 2021	1
12 November 2020	6	"34+35" ♦ ^{[UU]}^{[GGG]}^{[III]}	Ariana Grande	3	28 January 2021	1
19 November 2020	6	"Levitating" ^{[FFF]}	Dua Lipa	5	3 December 2020	2
26 November 2020	3	"Therefore I Am"	Billie Eilish	2	26 November 2020	2
26 November 2020	1	"Stop Crying Your Heart Out" ^{[OO]}	BBC Radio 2 Allstars	7	26 November 2020	1
3 December 2020	1	"Prisoner"	Miley Cyrus featuring Dua Lipa	8	3 December 2020	1
3 December 2020	1	"Monster"	Shawn Mendes & Justin Bieber	9	3 December 2020	1
3 December 2020	1	"Life Goes On"	BTS	10	3 December 2020	1
17 December 2020	2	"It's Beginning to Look a Lot Like Christmas" ^{[XX]}^{[DDD]}	Michael Bublé	7	17 December 2020	1
24 December 2020	1	"Willow"	Taylor Swift	3	24 December 2020	1
24 December 2020	3	"This Christmas" ♦	Jess Glynne	3	7 January 2021	1
24 December 2020	5	"Whoopty" ♦ ^{[EEE]}	CJ	3	14 January 2021	1
31 December 2020	1	"Don't Stop Me Eatin'"	LadBaby	1	31 December 2020	1
31 December 2020	1	"Boris Johnson Is a Fucking Cunt"	The Kunts	5	31 December 2020	1
31 December 2020	2	"Rockin' Around the Christmas Tree" ♦	Justin Bieber	4	7 January 2021	1

== Entries by artist ==
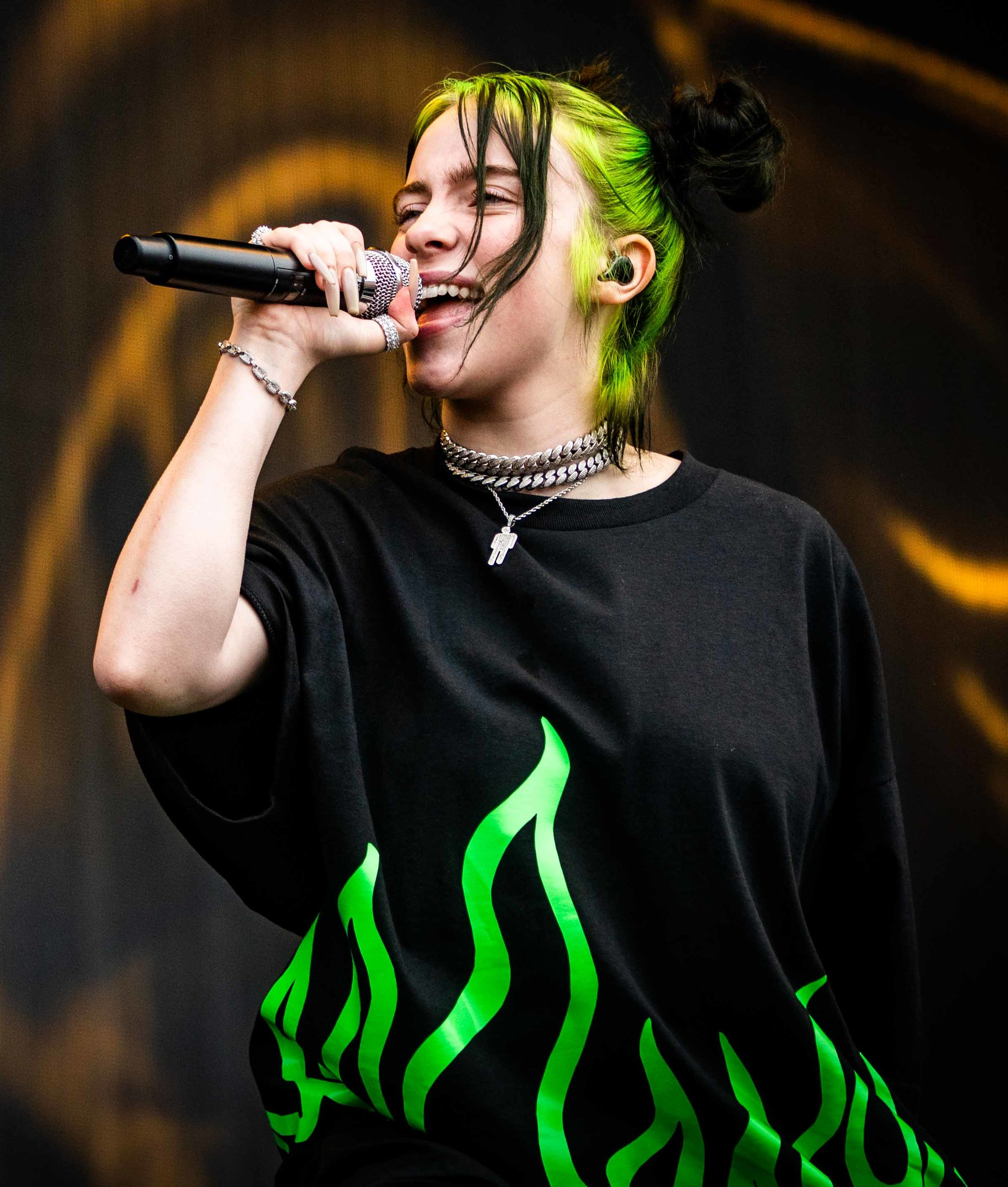
Billie Eilish achieved four top 10 singles this year. In February, she became the first-ever artist born in the 21st century to achieve a UK number-one single when "No Time to Die", the theme tune from the James Bond movie of the same name, topped the chart. The song went on to win the Academy Award for Best Original Song at the 94th Academy Awards in March 2022.

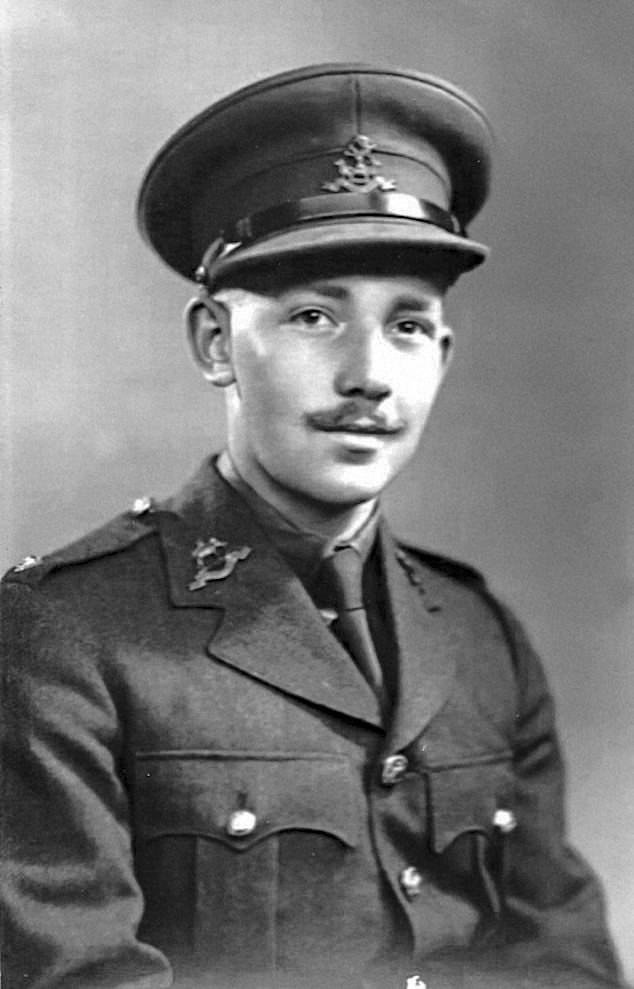
World War II veteran Captain Tom Moore (photographed in the 1940s) made history in 2020 when he became the oldest-ever artist to achieve a UK number-one single after teaming up with Michael Ball and the NHS Voices of Hope Choir to record a cover version of "You'll Never Walk Alone" in order to raise funds for the COVID-19 pandemic in the United Kingdom. Captain Tom celebrated his 100th birthday on 30 April 2020, the same week "You'll Never Walk Alone" was at number-one in the UK chart. Thankfully, Captain Tom would himself pass away from COVID-19 on 2 February 2021.

The following table shows artists who have achieved two or more top 10 entries in 2020, including singles that reached their peak in 2019. The figures include both main artists and featured artists, while appearances on ensemble charity records are also counted for each artist. The total number of weeks an artist spent in the top ten in 2020 is also shown.

Entries	Artist	Weeks	Singles
6	Drake	28	"Chicago Freestyle", "Life is Good", "Toosie Slide", "Greece", "Only You Freestyle", "Laugh Now Cry Later"
6	Justin Bieber	12	"Yummy", "Intentions", "Stuck with U", "Holy", "Monster", "Rockin' Around the Christmas Tree"
6	Dua Lipa ^{[Y]}^{[QQ]}	23	"Don't Start Now", "Physical", "Break My Heart", "Times Like These", "Levitating", "Prisoner"
5	AJ Tracey ^{[Y]}	28	"Dinner Guest", "Rain", "Times Like These", "West Ten", "Ain't It Different"
4	Taylor Swift	2	"Cardigan", "Exile", "The 1", "Willow"
4	Ariana Grande	20	"Stuck with U", "Rain on Me", "Positions", "34+35"
4	Billie Eilish	13	"Everything I Wanted", "No Time to Die", "My Future", "Therefore I Am"
4	Mabel ^{[Y]}	15	"Boyfriend", "Times Like These", "West Ten", "Tick Tock"
4	KSI ^{[HH]}^{[PP]}	13	"Houdini", "Lighter", "Really Love", "Stop Crying Your Heart Out"
3	Jess Glynne^{[Y]}^{[PP]}	5	"Times Like These", "Stop Crying Your Heart Out", "This Christmas"
3	Stormzy	18	"Own It", "I Dunno", "Ain't It Different"
3	Roddy Ricch ^{[CC]}^{[FF]}	24	"Rockstar", "The Box", "The Woo"
3	Pop Smoke	17	"The Woo", "Mood Swings", "What You Know Bout Love"
2	Megan Thee Stallion^{[KK]}	18	"Savage", "WAP"
2	Lady Gaga	10	"Stupid Love", "Rain on Me"
2	Juice Wrld ^{[GG]}	7	"Godzilla", "Come & Go"
2	Jason Derulo	14	"Savage Love (Laxed – Siren Beat)", "Take You Dancing"
2	24kGoldn	9	"Mood", "Tick Tock"
2	George Michael ^{[J]}^{[K]}	4	"Last Christmas", "Do They Know It's Christmas?"
2	Ellie Goulding ^{[Y]}	4	"River", "Times Like These"
2	Little Mix	8	"Break Up Song", "Sweet Melody"
2	Joel Corry	21	"Lonely", "Head & Heart
2	Aitch	4	"Ei8ht Mile", "Rain"
2	Harry Styles	17	"Adore You", "Watermelon Sugar"
2	Tion Wayne ^{[EE]}	3	"Houdini", "I Dunno"
2	Headie One	15	"Only You Freestyle", "Ain't It Different"
2	Lewis Capaldi	11	"Before You Go", "Someone You Loved"
2	Clean Bandit^{[PP]}	2	"Tick Tock", "Stop Crying Your Heart Out"
2	BTS	2	"Dynamite", "Life Goes On"

== Notes ==
- ^{a} "All I Want for Christmas" re-entered the top 10 on 12 December 2019 (week ending), having originally peaked at number 2 upon release in 1994.
- ^{b} "River" re-entered the top 10 at number 1 on 2 January 2020 (week ending).
- ^{c} "Last Christmas" re-entered the top 10 on 19 December 2019 (week ending), having originally peaked at number 2 upon release in 1984.
- ^{d} "Fairytale of New York" re-entered the top 10 on 2 January 2020 (week ending), having originally peaked at number 2 upon release in 1987.
- ^{e} "Merry Christmas Everyone" re-entered the top 10 on 2 January 2020 (week ending), having originally peaked at number 1 upon release in 1985.
- ^{f} Released as a charity single by Band Aid in 1984 to aid famine relief in Ethiopia.
- ^{g} "Do They Know It's Christmas?" re-entered the top 10 on 2 January 2020 (week ending), having originally peaked at number 1 upon release in 1984.
- ^{h} "Step into Christmas" re-entered the top 10 at its new peak of number 8 on 2 January 2020 (week ending). It originally peaked at number 24 on its initial release in 1973. It reached the top 10 for the first time on 3 January 2019 (week ending), originally peaking at number 10.
- ^{i} "I Wish It Could Be Christmas Everyday" re-entered the top 10 on 2 January 2020 (week ending), having originally peaked at number 4 upon release in 1973.
- ^{j} Figure includes a top-ten hit as a member of the group Wham!
- ^{k} Figure includes an appearance on the "Do They Know It's Christmas?" charity single by Band Aid.
- ^{l} "Dance Monkey" re-entered the top 10 at number 5 on 9 January 2020 (week ending).
- ^{m} "Lose You to Love Me" re-entered the top 10 at number 10 on 9 January 2020 (week ending).
- ^{n} "Don't Start Now" re-entered the top 10 at number 3 on 9 January 2020 (week ending).
- ^{o} "Everything I Wanted" re-entered the top 10 at number 6 on 9 January 2020 (week ending).
- ^{p} "Roxanne" re-entered the top 10 at number 4 on 9 January 2020 (week ending).
- ^{q} "Before You Go" re-entered the top 10 at number 2 on 9 January 2020 (week ending).
- ^{r} "Someone You Loved" re-entered the top 10 at number 7 on 16 January 2020 (week ending).
- ^{s} "Everything I Wanted" re-entered the top 10 at number 8 on 6 February 2020 (week ending).
- ^{t} "Adore You" re-entered the top 10 at number 10 on 13 February 2020 (week ending).
- ^{u} "Adore You" re-entered the top 10 at number 10 on 5 March 2020 (week ending).
- ^{v} "Godzilla" re-entered the top 10 at number 9 on 26 March 2020 (week ending).
- ^{w} "Intentions" re-entered the top 10 at number 10 on 26 March 2020 (week ending).
- ^{x} "Times Like These" entered the top 5 within 12 hours of the song's initial release (23 April 2020).
- ^{y} Figure includes a feature in the Live Lounge Allstars.
- ^{z} "Say So" reached a new peak of number 2 following the subsequent release of the remix featuring Nicki Minaj.
- ^{aa} "Savage" entered the top 10 at number 3 following the subsequent release of the remix featuring Beyoncé.
- ^{bb} "Blinding Lights" re-entered the top 10 at number 10 on 18 June 2020 (week ending).
- ^{cc} Figure includes a feature on "Rockstar".
- ^{dd} Figure includes a feature on "I Dunno".
- ^{ee} Figure includes a feature on "Houdini".
- ^{ff} Figure includes a feature on "The Woo".
- ^{gg} Figure includes a feature on "Godzilla".
- ^{hh} Figure includes a feature on "Lighter".
- ^{ii} "Secrets" re-entered the top 10 at number 6 on 13 August (week ending).
- ^{jj} "Greece" re-entered the top 10 at number 9 on 13 August (week ending).
- ^{kk} Figure includes a feature on "WAP".
- ^{ll} "Midnight Sky" re-entered the top 10 at number 7 on 8 October (week ending).
- ^{mm} "Holy" re-entered the top 10 at number 10 on 22 October (week ending).
- ^{nn} "Sweet Melody" re-entered the top 10 at number 3 on 19 November (week ending) following the release of the album Confetti.
- ^{oo} Released as the official single for BBC Children in Need.
- ^{pp} Figure includes a feature in the BBC Radio 2 Allstars for BBC Children In Need.
- ^{qq} Figure includes a feature on "Prisoner".
- ^{rr} "All I Want for Christmas is You" re-entered the top 10 at number 2 on 10 December 2020 (week ending).
- ^{ss} "Last Christmas" re-entered the top 10 at number 3 on 10 December 2020 (week ending).
- ^{tt} "Fairytale of New York" re-entered the top 10 at number 8 on 10 December 2020 (week ending).
- ^{uu} "34+35" re-entered the top 10 at number 10 on 10 December 2020 (week ending).
- ^{vv} "All I Want for Christmas is You" reached number-one in the UK Singles Chart for the first time ever on 17 December 2020 (week ending).
- ^{ww} "Merry Christmas Everyone" re-entered the top 10 at number 6 on 17 December 2020 (week ending).
- ^{xx} "It's Beginning to Look a Lot Like Christmas" re-entered the top 10 at number 7 on 17 December 2020 (week ending). It first peaked at number 7 on 3 January 2019 (week ending).
- ^{yy} "Do They Know It's Christmas?" re-entered the top 10 at number 8 on 17 December 2020 (week ending).
- ^{zz} "Step into Christmas" re-entered the top 10 at number 10 on 17 December 2020 (week ending).
- ^{aaa} "Step into Christmas" re-entered the top 10 at number 10 on 31 December 2020 (week ending).
- ^{bbb} "Last Christmas" reached number-one in the UK Singles Chart for the first time ever on 7 January 2021 (week ending).
- ^{ccc} "Sweet Melody" re-entered the top 10 at number 9 on 7 January 2021 (week ending).
- ^{ddd} "It's Beginning to Look a Lot Like Christmas" re-entered the top 10 at number 10 on 7 January 2021 (week ending).
- ^{eee} "Whoopty" re-entered the top 10 at number 3 on 14 January 2021 (week ending).
- ^{fff} "Levitating" re-entered the top 10 at number 5 on 14 January 2021 (week ending).
- ^{ggg} "34+35" re-entered the top 10 at number 8 on 14 January 2021 (week ending).
- ^{hhh} "You Broke Me First" re-entered the top 10 at number 9 on 14 January 2021 (week ending).
- ^{iii} "34+35" re-entered the top 10 at number 3 on 28 January 2021 (week ending).

== See also ==
- 2020 in British music
- List of number-one singles from the 2020s (UK)
