= UK Afrobeats Chart Top 20 songs of 2020 =

Annual list of the 20 most successful Afrobeats songs in the UK in 2020

The UK Afrobeats Singles Chart, is a chart that ranks the best-performing Afrobeats singles in the UK. Its data is published and compiled by Official Charts Company, from digital downloads, physical record sales, and audio streams in UK retail outlets. At the end of a year, OCC will publish an annual list of its 20 most successful Afrobeats songs, throughout that year on its website, and BBC Radio 1Xtra's website. For 2020, the list was published on 28 January 2021, by Rob Copsey, and calculated with data from August 1, 2020, to December 26, 2020.

== History ==
Darkoo's "Gangsta", led the end year chart, at number one. The song was among the first record to receive the UK Official Number 1 Award.

== Year-end list ==
List of songs on UK Afrobeats's 2020 Year-End chart
No.	Title	Artist(s)
1	"Gangsta"	Darkoo
2	"Play Play"	J Hus
3	"Jerusalema"	Master KG
4	"Ourself"	NSG
5	"Trust Issues"	NSG
6	"Real Life"	Burna Boy
7	"Juicy"	Darkoo, & Hardy Caprio
8	"I Like"	Kojo Funds
9	"4AM"	Manny Norté, 6lack, Tion Wayne, Rema
10	"D & G"	Davido
11	"Joro"	WizKid
12	"Risky"	Davido
13	"Party With A Jagaban"	Midas the Jagaban
14	"4 Nothin'"	melvitto, & Gabzy
15	"Can't Let You Go"	Stefflon Don
16	"Juice"	YCee
17	"Cut Me Off"	Yxng Bane
18	"Nobody"	Dj Neptune, Joeboy, & Mr Eazi
19	"Come We Bill Ehh"	Midas the Jagaban
20	"Again"	Wande Coal

== See also ==
- 2020 in British music
- UK Afrobeats Singles Chart
