= Darkoo =

Nigerian-British rapper, singer and songwriter

- Born: Oluwafisayo Isa; 18 September 2001 (age 25); Yaba, Lagos, Nigeria
- Genres: British hip hop; Afrobeats
- Occupations: Rapper; singer; songwriter
- Years active: 2017–present
- Labels: Atlantic Records UK; Virgin Music Nigeria

Oluwafisayo Isa (born 18 September 2001), known by her stage name Darkoo, is a Nigerian rapper and singer. She came to prominence following the release of her single "Gangsta", featuring One Acen, which peaked at number 22 on the Official Singles Chart, and peaked at number one, on the UK Afrobeats Chart of 2020.

== Early life ==
Darkoo was born in Lagos, Nigeria. She moved to the UK at the age of 7, and was raised in South London. She attended St Catherine's Catholic School for Girls. She also attended Christ the King: Emmanuel Sixth Form.

== Career ==
Darkoo began releasing music at the age of 15, starting out as a drill rapper before beginning to incorporate singing into her music. In late 2019 she released the single "Gangsta", featuring British rapper One Acen. The song came to prominence on TikTok and entered the Official Singles Chart at number 34 in November 2019, eventually reaching a peak of 22 in January 2020. She followed up this success in March 2020 with the single "Juicy" featuring Hardy Caprio, which peaked at 62 on the Official Singles Chart. At the 2020 MOBO Awards, Darkoo was nominated for Best Female Act and Best Newcomer, whilst "Gangsta" was nominated for Song of the Year.

In April 2021, Darkoo featured on a remix of "Body", originally performed by Russ Millions and Tion Wayne. The remix helped the song reach number 1 in the Official Singles Chart.

Darkoo released her debut EP, 2 In 1, in July 2021, featuring artists such as Tion Wayne and Unknown T. In 2022, Darkoo was nominated for the Best Diaspora Afrobeats Artist of the year at The Headies Awards and was announced by Pandora Music Italy as one of the most streamed musicians the following year. On 1 September 2023, following the launch of Virgin Music flagship in Nigeria, Virgin Music Nigeria, Kimani Moore announced the unit would be in charge of Darkoo, P.H.I.L.E.E and Reekado Banks distributions.

== Discography ==
=== Album(s) ===
- Sexy Girl Summer (Vol.1)

=== Singles ===
==== As lead artist ====
Title	Year	Peak chart positions	Certifications	Album
Title	Year	UK	Certifications	Album
"Gas Station" (featuring Curtis J)	2017	—		Non-album singles
"Timeline" (with Mulla Stackz)	2018	—		Non-album singles
"Foreign" (with AdeSTP & Shadz)	2019	—		Non-album singles
"Juice" (with Br3nya)	2019	—		Non-album singles
"Rover"	2019	—		Non-album singles
"Gangsta" (with One Acen)	2019	22	BPI: Platinum	Non-album singles
"Juicy" (with Hardy Caprio)	2020	62		Non-album singles
"Kryptonite"	2020	—		Non-album singles
"Cinderella" (featuring 4Keus)	2020	—		Non-album singles
"Pick Up"	2021	—		2 in 1
"She Like" (featuring Blanco)	2021	—		2 in 1
"Slow Down" (featuring Tion Wayne)	2021	—		2 in 1
"Bad From Early" (featuring Buju & TSB)	2021	—		Non-album singles
"Always" (featuring Black Sherif)	2022	—		Non-album singles
"Falling" (with Smallgod & KiDi)	2022	—		Non-album singles
"There She Goes (Jack Sparrow)" (featuring Mayorkun)	2022	—		Non-album singles
"Favorite Girl" (featuring Dess Dior)	2024	—		Non-album singles
"Right Now" (featuring Davido and Rvssian)	2024	—		Non-album singles
"Focus On Me (All The Sexy Girls In the Club)"	2025	—		
"Like Dat"	2025	—		
"Your Number"	2025	—		
"Give Me Love (From F1 The Movie)"	2025	—		
"Solar"	2026	—		

==== As featured artist ====
Title	Year	Peak chart positions			Certifications	Album
Title	Year	UK	AUS	NZ	Certifications	Album
"Body" (Remix) (Russ Millions and Tion Wayne featuring ArrDee, E1 (3x3), Bugzy Malone, Fivio Foreign, ZT (3x3), Darkoo, and Buni	2021	1	1	1	BPI: Platinum; ARIA: 2× Platinum	Green With Envy and Pier Pressure
"RHUDE GYAL" (ft Darkoo)	2025					
"SNOKONOKO IV" (ft Darkoo)	2026					
