= To the Moon (song) =

Single by Jnr Choi and Sam Tompkins
- Released: 5 November 2021
- Recorded: August 2021
- Genre: Drill
- Length: 2:31
- Label: Black Butter; Epic
- Songwriters: Jnr Choi; Bruno Mars; Philip Lawrence; Ari Levine; Albert Winkler; Jeff Bhasker
- Producer: Parked Up

Jnr Choi singles chronology
"Top of the League" (2021)	"To the Moon" (2021)

"To the Moon" (stylised all caps, also written "to the moon!" per its cover) is a song by Gambian-born England-based rapper Jnr Choi, released as a single on 5 November 2021 independently, and later through Epic and Black Butter Records. It is a drill track that samples British singer-songwriter Sam Tompkins's cover of Bruno Mars's "Talking to the Moon". It went viral on TikTok and was prominently playlisted by Spotify.

== Background ==
Jnr Choi was born in Gambia and moved to London, where he pursued a career in modelling and also began rapping after a friend suggested the idea to him. He collaborated with the producer Parked Up in August 2021, who sent him a beat. Jnr Choi wrote the lyrics for it and "sent it back the next day completely finished".

Sam Tompkins is a singer-songwriter from Brighton who has had successful viral videos on TikTok. He released his debut EP Who Do You Pray To? in 2022.

== Temporary removal from streaming platforms ==
"To the Moon" was temporarily removed from streaming platforms in January 2022 before being restored, which was considered to be in relation to the rights regarding its sample. After being re-added, Tompkins received a co-lead artist credit.

== Remixes ==
Two remixes to the song were released. One remix featured American rapper Gunna and was released on 25 March 2022. The second remix was a drill remix featuring American rappers Fivio Foreign and G Herbo alongside British rappers Russ Millions and M24, which was released on 29 April 2022.

== Charts ==
=== Weekly charts ===
Weekly chart performance for "To the Moon"
Chart (2021–2022)	Peak position
Australia (ARIA)	32
Austria (Ö3 Austria Top 40)	29
Belgium (Ultratop 50 Wallonia)	16
Canada (Canadian Hot 100)	60
France (SNEP)	27
Germany (GfK)	24
Global 200 (Billboard)	64
Ireland (IRMA)	63
Italy (FIMI)	73
Lithuania (AGATA)	53
Netherlands (Single Top 100)	64
New Zealand Hot Singles (RMNZ)	2
Portugal (AFP)	36
South Africa Streaming (TOSAC)	76
Sweden (Sverigetopplistan)	69
Switzerland (Schweizer Hitparade)	17
UK Singles (OCC)	48
UK Indie (OCC)	11
UK Hip Hop/R&B (OCC)	23
US Billboard Hot 100	38
US Mainstream Top 40 (Billboard)	18
US Hot R&B/Hip-Hop Songs (Billboard)	10
US Rhythmic (Billboard)	1

=== Year-end charts ===
2022 year-end chart performance for "To the Moon"
Chart (2022)	Position
Belgium (Ultratop 50 Wallonia)	70
France (SNEP)	90
Switzerland (Schweizer Hitparade)	64
US Billboard Hot 100	97
US Hot R&B/Hip-Hop Songs (Billboard)	20
US Rhythmic (Billboard)	11

== Certifications ==
Certifications for "To the Moon"
Region	Certification	Certified units/sales
Austria (IFPI Austria)	Gold	15,000^{‡}
Canada (Music Canada)	Platinum	80,000^{‡}
France (SNEP)	Platinum	200,000^{‡}
Italy (FIMI)	Gold	50,000^{‡}
New Zealand (RMNZ)	Platinum	30,000^{‡}
Portugal (AFP)	Gold	5,000^{‡}
Switzerland (IFPI Switzerland)	Gold	10,000^{‡}
United Kingdom (BPI)	Silver	200,000^{‡}
United States (RIAA)	Platinum	1,000,000^{‡}
^{‡} Sales+streaming figures based on certification alone.

== Release history ==
Release history and formats for "To the Moon"
Region	Date	Format	Label	Ref.
Various	5 November 2021	Digital download; streaming	Self-released (initial): Epic; Black Butter (later)	
Italy	4 February 2022	Contemporary hit radio	Sony	
United States	15 February 2022	Rhythmic contemporary radio	Epic	
United States	15 February 2022	Urban contemporary radio	Epic	
