= Options (NSG song) =

Single by NSG featuring Tion Wayne
- Released: 30 November 2018
- Genre: Afrobeats
- Length: 4:00
- Label: NSG Entertainment
- Producer(s): Jae5

NSG singles chronology
"OT Bop" (2018)	"Options" (2018)	"Trust Issues" (2019)

Tion Wayne singles chronology
"Sweet Thug" (2018)	"Options" (2018)	"Keisha & Becky" (2019)

"Options" is a song by NSG featuring vocals from Tion Wayne and production by Jae5. It was released on 30 November 2018 by NSG Entertainment. It peaked at number 7 on the UK Singles Chart in March 2019, and also reached number 52 on the Irish Singles Chart.

== Track listing ==
Digital download
No.	Title	Length
1.	"Options"	4:00

== Charts ==
=== Weekly charts ===
Chart (2019)	Peak position
Ireland (IRMA)	52
UK Singles (OCC)	7

=== Year-end charts ===
Chart (2019)	Position
UK Singles (Official Charts Company)	32

== Certifications ==
Region	Certification	Certified units/sales
United Kingdom (BPI)	2× Platinum	1,200,000^{‡}
^{‡} Sales+streaming figures based on certification alone.
