= Sam Tompkins =

British R&B/pop singer-songwriter

Sam Tompkins (born April 18, 1997) is a British R&B/pop singer-songwriter from Eastbourne. His debut EP titled Who Do You Pray To? debuted at number 7 on the UK Albums Chart. His single "Lose It All" peaked at number 81 on the UK Singles Chart, while his collaboration with Jnr Choi titled "To the Moon" spent 14 weeks on the UK chart, peaking at number 48, and reached number 1 on both the Billboard Rhythmic and Rap Airplay charts in the US. He released his debut 16-track album Hi, My Name Is Insecure in July 2024.

== Discography ==
=== Albums ===
List of albums, with selected chart positions
Title	Album details	Peak chart positions
Title	Album details	UK
Hi, My Name Is Insecure	Released: July 2024; Label: Island (5887507)	8
Are We Gonna Sing?	Released: 4 September 2026; Label: Island	(Note: Are We Gonna Sing? did not enter the UK top 100, but peaked at number 15 on the Albums Sales Chart.)

=== Extended plays ===
List of EPs, with selected chart positions
Title	Album details	Peak chart positions
Title	Album details	UK
From My Sleeve to the World	Released: 9 October 2019; Label: Sam Tompkins, Universal	—
Isolation Diaries	Released: 1 May 2020; Label: Sam Tompkins, Universal	—
Who Do You Pray To?	Released: March 2022; Label: Island (3880106)	7

=== Charted singles ===
List of charted singles, with selected chart positions
Title	Year	Peak chart positions			Album
Title	Year	UK	NZ Hot	US	Album
"To the Moon" (with Jnr Choi)	2021	48	2	38	
"Lose It All"	2022	81	—	—	Hi, My Name Is Insecure
"How to Save a Life"	2026	— (Note: "How to Save a Life" did not enter the UK Singles Chart, but peaked at number 30 on the UK Singles Sales Chart.)	7	— (Note: "How to Save a Life" did not enter the Billboard Hot 100, but peaked at number 22 on the Digital Song Sales chart.)	TBA
