= I Dunno =

Single by Tion Wayne featuring Dutchavelli and Stormzy
- Released: 29 May 2020
- Length: 2:58
- Label: Atlantic
- Songwriters: Dennis Jr. Odunwo; Stephen Allen; Michael Omari
- Producers: AoD; The Elements

Tion Wayne singles chronology
"4AM" (2020)	"I Dunno" (2020)	"Come Over" (2020)

Dutchavelli singles chronology
"Burning" (2020)	"I Dunno" (2020)	"Bando Diaries" (2020)

Stormzy singles chronology
"Still Disappointed" (2020)	"I Dunno" (2020)	"Real Life" (2020)

Music video
- "I Dunno" on YouTube

"I Dunno" is a song by Tion Wayne featuring Dutchavelli and Stormzy. It was released as a single on 29 May 2020 and peaked at number 7 on the UK Singles Chart.

== Production ==
The song "I Dunno" brought together 3 artists who had been making a big impact in British music. Tion Wayne had broken through with his Russ Millions collaboration "Keisha & Becky" in 2019, reaching the top 10 and topping the Official Trending Chart. Dutchavelli made his breakthrough this year, also going on to score a further chart hit alongside M Huncho on the track "Burning". Stormzy had fully established himself as a music star and released his second album, Heavy Is the Head, at the end of 2019 and a chart topping single "Own It" with Ed Sheeran and Burna Boy. The track was produced by AoD and production group The Elements.

== Chart performance ==
"I Dunno" was the highest new entry on its first week of release, entering the UK Singles Chart at number 7 on the chart week ending 11 June 2020. The single was behind songs including chart topper "Rockstar" by DaBaby featuring Roddy Ricch, "Rain on Me" by Lady Gaga and Ariana Grande and "Breaking Me" by Topic featuring A7S. The song spent three weeks in the top 10 in total, and a further six weeks in the top 40.

== Charts ==
=== Weekly charts ===
Chart (2020)	Peak position
UK Singles (Official Charts)	7

=== Year-end charts ===
Chart (2020)	Position
UK Singles (OCC)	78

== Certifications ==
Region	Certification	Certified units/sales
New Zealand (RMNZ)	Gold	15,000^{‡}
United Kingdom (BPI)	Platinum	600,000^{‡}
^{‡} Sales+streaming figures based on certification alone.
