= No Time to Die (song) =

2020 single by Billie Eilish

Single by Billie Eilish

from the album No Time to Die
- Released: February 13, 2020
- Recorded: October – December 19, 2019
- Genre: Orchestral pop
- Length: 4:02
- Label: Darkroom; Interscope
- Songwriters: Billie Eilish; Finneas O'Connell
- Producers: O'Connell; Stephen Lipson

Billie Eilish singles chronology
"Everything I Wanted" (2019)	"No Time to Die" (2020)	"Ilomilo" (2020)

James Bond theme singles chronology
"Writing's on the Wall" (2015)	"No Time to Die" (2020)	"First Light" (2026)

Music video
- No Time to Die on YouTube

"No Time to Die" is the theme song for the James Bond film of the same name, performed by American singer-songwriter Billie Eilish. Written by Eilish and her brother and collaborator, Finneas O'Connell, the song was produced by O'Connell and Stephen Lipson and features orchestration by Hans Zimmer. It was released through Darkroom and Interscope Records on February 13, 2020, and later included on the film's soundtrack album on October 1, 2021. Aged 17 at the time of recording, Eilish is the youngest artist to have recorded a James Bond theme in the history of the franchise.

"No Time to Die" debuted atop the UK Singles Chart and the Irish Singles Chart. It became Eilish's first number-one single in the UK and made her the first artist born in the 21st century to top the chart. The song is the second Bond theme overall to top the UK chart. "No Time to Die" debuted and peaked at number 16 on the US Billboard Hot 100.

"No Time to Die" received various accolades, including the Grammy Award for Best Song Written for Visual Media, the Golden Globe Award for Best Original Song, the Critics' Choice Movie Award for Best Song, and the Academy Award for Best Original Song, making it the third-ever and third consecutive Bond theme to win the Academy Award (after "Skyfall" from the film of the same name by Adele in 2012 and "Writing's on the Wall" from Spectre by Sam Smith in 2015). Eilish became the first person born in the 21st century to win an Academy Award.

== Background and production ==
In an interview with Zane Lowe for Apple Music, Billie Eilish said that she and her brother, Finneas O'Connell, used to make up songs they thought as possible themes for the James Bond film series, while thinking they would never get such an opportunity. After her August 30 concert at Ireland's Electric Picnic, Eilish and O'Connell met Bond producer Barbara Broccoli, who then invited them to compose the theme for the upcoming film No Time to Die, which they promptly accepted. They were given parts of the script and started to create the theme. The initial attempts, where O'Connell tried to write the song with a guitar, stumbled on mutual writer's block by the siblings. O'Connell later found a piano in the green room of a Texas arena and played a riff which would become the song's opening, and was described by Eilish as the spark for their composing process. After three days of composition, they recorded a demo in October, inside a bunk in their tour bus as it was parked in a Texas arena. Finneas added that after they finished writing, the two listened to all the previous theme songs to ensure their originality, "make sure that we weren't making something that just felt like we were copying other great songs".

The demo was sent to Hans Zimmer's office in Los Angeles, and was the favorite of the prospect themes that he heard. On December 19, Eilish and Finneas flew to London to work with Zimmer, recording the song with a 70-person orchestra at George Martin's AIR Studios. Eilish said the process was more collaborative than she expected, and that "Hans was incredibly—like, easy to work with." Guitarist Johnny Marr, who was performing in Zimmer's score for the movie and was brought in to play in the song, declared that "we just kept coming back to 'reduce, reduce, reduce'", wanting something that reflected the musical simplicity of Eilish's usual output, where "the power is in the intensity of the performance." After seeing a rough cut of the film, Eilish decided to add in a climactic belting of the song's title.

== Composition and lyrics ==
"No Time to Die"
A 24-second sample of "No Time to Die". The song has been compared positively to previous Bond themes for its "slow build" and "dramatic orchestration."

Musically, "No Time to Die" is an orchestral pop ballad with R&B influences. The track runs at 74 BPM and is in the key of E minor. It runs at four minutes and two seconds. Eilish's vocals span E3 to D5, which include a belted B4. According to Roisin O'Connor of The Independent, the song "features classic elements of the most memorable Bond themes including a slow build; a dark, shivery theme; and dramatic orchestration". Cassie Da Costa of The Daily Beast said the song "begins with moody, atmospheric piano music before Billie's pop-enunciated alto vibrato creeps in with depressive yet vague observations about love, loss, and violence". The song features orchestral arrangements by Hans Zimmer as well as Johnny Marr on guitar.

According to Sheldon Pearce of Pitchfork, the lyrics reflect the "betrayal hinted at in the film's trailer and embody the tension of espionage". In the chorus of the song, Eilish sings about a lover's betrayal, more specifically, James Bond (Daniel Craig)'s belief that Madeleine Swann (Léa Seydoux) betrayed him: "Was I stupid to love you?/ Was I reckless to help?/Was it obvious to everybody else/That I'd fallen for a lie?/You were never on my side/Fool me once, fool me twice/Are you death or paradise?/Now you'll never see me cry/There's just no time to die."

== Promotion ==
Eilish was announced as the performer of the theme song for the 25th film in the James Bond franchise in January 2020, initially via the franchise's official Twitter account. Eilish called the opportunity "a huge honor", and O'Connell said they "feel so so lucky to play a small role in such a legendary franchise". No Time to Die director Cary Joji Fukunaga described himself as a fan of the duo, and the film's producers, Michael G. Wilson and Barbara Broccoli, said the song is "impeccably crafted". At the 92nd Academy Awards, Eilish said the ballad was "written" and "done".

Eilish performed the song live for the first time at the 2020 Brit Awards on February 18, 2020, alongside O'Connell, Zimmer and Marr.

== Music video ==
The official music video for "No Time to Die" was released on October 1, 2020. The video was shot in black-and-white clip and was directed by Daniel Kleinman, who has designed every title sequence for the James Bond series since GoldenEye in 1995 (with the exception of Quantum of Solace in 2008).

In the visual, it shows Eilish singing behind an old-fashioned microphone, as she stares into the camera interspersed with scenes from the film showing James Bond (Daniel Craig) and Madeleine Swann (Léa Seydoux) engaging in a love affair. The song also shows Lyutsifer Safin (Rami Malek) in the opening scene, and Madeleine finding his shattered mask.

Justin Curto, writing for Vulture magazine, mentions the video has "smokey lounge-singer vibes". Rachel McRady of Entertainment Tonight commented that it was clear that "Madeleine betrays 007 in some way as the video continuously shares shots of the agent looking distrustful as he gazes upon his ladylove".

== Critical reception ==
Alexis Petridis of The Guardian gave an overall positive review, stating that "No Time to Die" is a "confident" and "appealing addition to the Bond theme canon". Chris Willman, writing for Variety, wrote that the track was one of the better James Bond themes to be written in the last 25 to 30 years.

Roisin O'Connor of The Independent stated that "'No Time to Die' is one of the best Bond theme songs we've had in some time." Alexa Camp of Slant Magazine said, "the lush, darkly cinematic track falls in line with past 007 themes".

Cassie Da Costa of The Daily Beast described the song as "not at the level" of Shirley Bassey's "Goldfinger" from the 1964 film of the same name and Nancy Sinatra's "You Only Live Twice" from the 1967 Bond installment, and said it was certainly not "Eilish's best, but as of late, the Bond universe has been perfectly satisfied with good enough."

In June 2020, Billboard ranked "No Time to Die" as the 22nd best song of 2020 so far.

=== Accolades ===
Awards and nominations received by "No Time to Die"
Organization	Date of ceremony	Category	Result	Ref.
Academy Awards	March 27, 2022	Best Original Song	Won	
American Cinematheque	December 17, 2021	Tribute to the Crafts – Feature Film	Won	
Capri Hollywood International Film Festival	January 3, 2022	Best Original Song	Won	
Chicago Indie Critics Awards	January 3, 2022	Best Original Song	Won	
Critics Association of Central Florida	July 13, 2022	Best Original Song	Won	
Critics' Choice Movie Awards	March 13, 2022	Best Song	Won	
Denver Film Critics Society	October 30, 2022	Best Original Song	Won	
Georgia Film Critics Association Awards	January 14, 2022	Best Original Song	Won	
Golden Globe Awards	January 9, 2022	Best Original Song	Won	
Grammy Awards	March 14, 2021	Best Song Written for Visual Media	Won	
Hawaii Film Critics Society Awards	January 14, 2022	Best Original Song	Won	
Hit FM Music Awards	February 20, 2021	Best Original Song of the Year	Won	
Hollywood Critics Association Film Awards	February 28, 2022	Best Original Song	Nominated	
Hollywood Music in Media Awards	November 17, 2021	Best Original Song in a Feature Film	Won	
Houston Film Critics Society Awards	January 19, 2022	Best Original Song	Nominated	
RTHK International Pop Poll Awards	March 28, 2021	Top Ten International Gold Songs	Won	
Satellite Awards	April 2, 2022	Best Original Song	Nominated	
Society of Composers & Lyricists Awards	March 8, 2022	Outstanding Original Song for a Dramatic or Documentary Visual Media Production	Won	
Variety Hitmakers	December 3, 2021	Film Song of the Year	Won	
World Soundtrack Awards	October 22, 2022	Best Original Song	Won	

== Credits and personnel ==
Credits adapted from Tidal and 007.com.

- Billie Eilish – vocals, songwriting
- Finneas – production, songwriting, bass, percussion, piano, synthesizer, drum programming, vocal arrangement
- Stephen Lipson – production, mixing
- Johnny Marr – guitar
- Hans Zimmer – orchestral arrangements
- Matt Dunkley – orchestral arrangements
- Rob Kinelski – mixing
- Casey Cuayo – mix engineering
- Ali Khazaee - Cover Art
- Eli Heisler – mix engineering
- John Greenham – mastering

== Track listing ==
Digital Download

- "No Time to Die"

7-inch single

- "No Time to Die"
- "No Time to Die" (Instrumental)

Limited Edition Record Store Day 7-inch single

- "No Time to Die" (Live at the BRIT Awards)
- "No Time to Die" (Demo)

== Charts ==
=== Weekly charts ===
Chart (2020–2021)	Peak position
Australia (ARIA)	4
Austria (Ö3 Austria Top 40)	2
Belgium (Ultratop 50 Flanders)	3
Belgium (Ultratop 50 Wallonia)	42
Canada Hot 100 (Billboard)	11
Czech Republic Airplay (ČNS IFPI)	99
Czech Republic Singles Digital (ČNS IFPI)	1
Denmark (Tracklisten)	4
Estonia (Eesti Tipp-40)	1
Euro Digital Song Sales (Billboard)	1
Finland (Suomen virallinen lista)	3
France (SNEP)	26
Germany (GfK)	5
Global 200 (Billboard)	166
Greece International (IFPI)	2
Hungary (Single Top 40)	1
Hungary (Stream Top 40)	1
Iceland (Tónlistinn)	3
Ireland (IRMA)	1
Israel International Airplay (Media Forest)	4
Italy (FIMI)	25
Japan Hot 100 (Billboard)	63
Lebanon (Lebanese Top 20)	17
Malaysia (RIM)	4
Netherlands (Dutch Top 40)	15
Netherlands (Single Top 100)	3
New Zealand (Recorded Music NZ)	9
Norway (VG-lista)	3
Portugal (AFP)	6
Scottish Singles Sales (Official Charts)	1
Singapore (RIAS)	5
Slovakia Singles Digital (ČNS IFPI)	1
Spain (Promusicae)	43
Sweden (Sverigetopplistan)	3
Switzerland (Schweizer Hitparade)	2
UK Singles (Official Charts)	1
US Billboard Hot 100	16
US Hot Rock & Alternative Songs (Billboard)	22

=== Year-end charts ===
Chart (2020)	Position
Belgium (Ultratop Flanders)	88
Hungary (Single Top 40)	48
Hungary (Stream Top 40)	75
Iceland (Tónlistinn)	79
Portugal (AFP)	129
Switzerland (Schweizer Hitparade)	84
UK Singles (OCC)	63
US Hot Rock & Alternative Songs (Billboard)	65

== Certifications ==
Region	Certification	Certified units/sales
Australia (ARIA)	2× Platinum	140,000^{‡}
Austria (IFPI Austria)	Platinum	30,000^{‡}
Brazil (Pro-Música Brasil)	3× Platinum	120,000^{‡}
Canada (Music Canada)	2× Platinum	160,000^{‡}
Denmark (IFPI Danmark)	Platinum	90,000^{‡}
France (SNEP)	Platinum	200,000^{‡}
Germany (BVMI)	Gold	200,000^{‡}
Italy (FIMI)	Gold	35,000^{‡}
New Zealand (RMNZ)	Platinum	30,000^{‡}
Norway (IFPI Norway)	Gold	30,000^{‡}
Poland (ZPAV)	2× Platinum	100,000^{‡}
Portugal (AFP)	Platinum	10,000^{‡}
Spain (Promusicae)	Gold	30,000^{‡}
United Kingdom (BPI)	2× Platinum	1,200,000^{‡}
United States (RIAA)	Platinum	1,000,000^{‡}
Streaming
Greece (IFPI Greece)	Gold	1,000,000^{†}
^{‡} Sales+streaming figures based on certification alone.^{†} Streaming-only figures based on certification alone.

== Release history ==
Region	Date	Format(s)	Version(s)	Label(s)	Ref.
Various	February 13, 2020	Digital download; streaming	Original	Darkroom; Interscope	
Italy	February 14, 2020	Radio airplay	Original	Universal	
Various	September 14, 2020	7" single	Original; instrumental	Darkroom; Interscope	
Various	October 5, 2020	7" picture disc	Original; instrumental	Darkroom; Interscope; Polydor	
Various	November 26, 2021	RSD 7" single	Live at the Brit Awards; demo	Darkroom; Interscope	

== See also ==
- List of number-one digital songs of 2020 (U.S.)
- List of number-one singles of 2020 (Ireland)
- List of Official Audio Streaming Chart number ones of the 2020s
- List of top 10 singles in 2020 (Australia)
- List of UK Singles Chart number ones of the 2020s
- List of UK Singles Downloads Chart number ones of the 2020s
- List of UK Singles Sales Chart number ones
- List of UK top-ten singles in 2020
