= A1 x J1 =

British rapper duo

- Origin: Coventry, England; Kent, England
- Genres: British hip hop
- Occupations: Rappers; songwriters
- Years active: 2021–present
- Labels: EMI Records
- Members: Phineas "A1orfundz" Waweru (born 13 May 2005); Joshua "J1mulla" Somerkun (born 4 June 2003)

A1 x J1 (real names Phineas Waweru and Joshua Soremekun) are a British hip hop duo. They released their debut single "Latest Trends" in February 2021, which charted at number 2 in the UK and was remixed by Aitch and A Boogie wit da Hoodie. Their second single "Baby" featured British singer and rapper Deno. They were also featured on the deluxe edition of KSI's album All Over the Place, and on the debut single by British rapper SwitchOTR, as well as recording a song for the Plugged In series by Fumez the Engineer.

== Discography ==
=== Singles ===
==== As lead artist ====
List of singles as lead artist, with year released, selected chart positions, and album name shown
Title	Year	Peak chart positions							Certifications	Album
Title	Year	UK	AUS	FIN	IRE	NOR	NZ Hot	SWE	Certifications	Album
"Latest Trends" (Solo or remix featuring Aitch or A Boogie wit da Hoodie)	2021	2	68	—	10	—	25	61	BPI: Platinum; RMNZ: Gold	Non-album singles
"Plugged In" (with Fumez the Engineer)	2021	—	—	—	—	—	—	—		Non-album singles
"Baby" (featuring Deno)	2021	98	—	—	—	—	—	—		Non-album singles
"Night Away (Dance)" (featuring Tion Wayne)	2022	11	83	10	21	17	26	81	BPI: Gold; RMNZ: Gold	Non-album singles
"Deal or No Deal" (featuring Mabel)	2022	98	—	—	—	—	—	—		About Last Night...
"Don't Lie" (featuring Nemzzz)	2022	—	—	—	—	—	—	—		Non-album single
"One of a Kind" (with Russ Millions and French the Kid)	2022	—	—	—	—	—	—	—		One of a Kind
"Man on a Mission" (featuring SL)	2022	—	—	—	—	—	—	—		Non-album singles
"Scary" (with Aitch)	2023	88	—	—	—	—	—	—		Non-album singles
"Pretty Girls Love DBE"	2023	—	—	—	—	—	—	—		Non-album singles
"Bad Guy"	2024	—	—	—	—	—	—	—		Non-album singles

==== As featured artist ====
List of singles as featured artist, with year released, selected chart positions, and album name shown
Title	Year	Peak chart positions							Certifications	Album
Title	Year	UK	DEN	IRE	NLD	NOR	NZ Hot	SWE	Certifications	Album
"Coming for You" (SwitchOTR featuring A1 x J1)	2021	5	37	22	71	28	7	59	BPI: Platinum; RMNZ: Gold	Non-album single
"Deep End" (Adzmilli featuring A1 x J1)	2023	—	—	—	—	—	—	—		LO(V/S)ER

=== Guest appearances ===
List of non-single guest appearances, with other performing artists
Title	Year	Other artist(s)	Album
"Know You"	2021	KSI, S-X	All Over the Place (Deluxe)
"Where Did You Go?" (Remix)	2022	Jax Jones, MNEK	Non-single remix
"Highs & Lows" (Remix)	2023	Prinz, Gabriella Bee	Non-single remix

== Awards and nominations ==
Year	Award	Nominated work	Category	Result	Ref.
2021	MOBO Awards	"Latest Trends"	Song of the Year	Nominated	
2022	BRIT Awards	"Latest Trends"	Song of the Year	Nominated	
