= Still Disappointed =

Single by Stormzy
- Released: 10 January 2020
- Recorded: 7 January 2020
- Genre: Grime; diss track
- Length: 4:06
- Label: #Merky; Warner; ADA
- Songwriter: Michael Omari
- Producer: Mikey J

Stormzy singles chronology
"Disappointed" (2020)	"Still Disappointed" (2020)	"I Dunno" (2020)

Music video
- "Still Disappointed" on YouTube

"Still Disappointed" (stylised in all uppercase) is a song by English rapper Stormzy. It was released as a single on 10 January 2020. It is Stormzy's second diss track aimed at rapper Wiley. The song peaked at number 21 on the UK Singles Chart.

== Background ==
On Stormzy's previous single "Disappointed", he branded Wiley a 'crackhead cunt'. This came after Wiley said Stormzy was 'worse than Ed Sheeran' on his own song, "Eediyat Skengman". In response, on 8 January Wiley released the single "Eediyat Skengman 2" which sees the rapper take aim at Stormzy's mother. Which resulted in Stormzy releasing the single "Still Disappointed".

== Music video ==
A music video to accompany the release of "Still Disappointed" was first released onto YouTube on 8 January 2020.

== Charts ==
Chart (2020)	Peak position
Ireland (IRMA)	32
New Zealand Hot Singles (RMNZ)	39
Scotland Singles (OCC)	41
UK Singles (OCC)	21
UK Hip Hop/R&B (OCC)	6

== Certifications ==
Region	Certification	Certified units/sales
United Kingdom (BPI)	Silver	200,000^{‡}
^{‡} Sales+streaming figures based on certification alone.

== Release history ==
Region	Date	Format	Label
United Kingdom	10 January 2020	Digital download; streaming	#Merky; Warner; ADA
