= Morrisson (rapper) =

British rapper

- Born: 1987 (age 38–39); Newham, London, England
- Genres: British hip hop; road rap
- Occupations: Rapper; songwriter
- Years active: 2008–present
- Labels: Since '93; RCA

Jonathan Francis Morrisson (born 1987), known professionally as Morrisson, is a British rapper. Several of his singles charted on the UK Singles Chart in 2020–21, while also reaching the top 40 of the UK R&B Singles Chart. His 2021 UK garage single, "House & Garage", reached No. 46 and features rapper Aitch. Morrisson has also collaborated with Bugzy Malone, Giggs, Harry James, Headie One, Jordan McCann, Kelly Kiara, Krept & Konan, Loski, M1llionz, Sidhu Moose Wala, Steel Banglez, Tion Wayne among others.

== Personal life ==
In 2012, Morrisson's brother Stephen Morrisson was arrested and charged with burglary, drug offences and failing to surrender to police bail. He was stabbed to death in June 2020.

In November 2020, Morrisson was involved in a fight between Tion Wayne and Headie One on an Emirates flight, in which he tried to break up the altercation.

Morrisson and fellow rapper Nines got into a disagreement which started when Nines taunted Morrisson for allegedly copying his trend of wearing a pendant depicting the logo of the football club Arsenal, which is Nines' favourite team. Morrisson, via Snapchat, then publicly replied that he had gone to Church Road where Nines lived at the time and taught Nines 'game', and that he had also taught Nines to grow and sell cannabis to customers illegally.

Morrisson is a supporter of the professional football team West Ham United.

== Discography ==
=== Studio albums ===
List of studio albums, with selected details
Title	Details	Peak chart positions
Title	Details	UK
British Trap Royalty	Released: 19 July 2024; Label: NQ Records; Format: digital download, streaming	28

=== Extended plays ===
List of extended plays
Title	Mixtape details
Guilty	Released: 20 August 2021; Label: Since '93; Format: digital download, streaming

=== Singles ===
List of singles, with year released, selected chart positions and certifications
Title	Year	Peak chart positions		Album
Title	Year	UK	UK R&B	Album
"Brothers" (featuring Jordan McCann)	2020	47	35	Guilty
"Bad Guy" (featuring Loski)	2020	47	26	Guilty
"House & Garage" (featuring Aitch)	2021	46	16	Guilty
"Blama" (with Steel Banglez and Tion Wayne)	2021	94	—	Non-album singles
"Olé (We Are England)" (with Krept and Konan, S1lva and M1llionz)	2021	51	14	Non-album singles
"Cos of You"	2026	34	6	Non-album singles
"—" denotes a recording that did not chart.

=== Music videos ===
- "Bad Boys"
- "Bad Guy" (feat. Loski)
- "Brothers" (feat. Jordan McCann)
- "Buckingham Palace"
- "Crowbar in My Bag"
- "Gulag" (feat. M24)
