= NSG (group) =

British hip hop collective

- Origin: Hackney, London, England
- Genres: British hip hop, grime, afroswing
- Years active: 2013–present
- Label: NSG Entertainment
- Members: OGD; Kruddz; Mojo; Dope; Papii Abz; Mxjib

NSG is a British afroswing collective from Hackney, East London. The group consists of six members: OGD, Kruddz, Mojo, Dope, Papii Abz, and Mxjib They released their first Album "AREA BOYZ" (2023) an EP, Grown Up (2016) and mixtape Roots (2020) — which includes their most successful singles "Options" featuring Tion Wayne and "Yo Darlin" featuring Geko. They released their second album, "The Big Six" on 28 February 2025, and third album "Sounds Of The Diaspora" in 2026. NSG is an acronym with multiple meanings such as: Nipple Sucking Gang, Non-Stop Grinding, Never Stop Growing, Nice Silly Guys, No Sleep Gang, and Nigeria Slash Ghana.

== History ==
NSG are a collective of childhood friends who grew up in Hackney, London, attended the same high school, the Arts and Media School, Islington. One of the members studied at the University of Hertfordshire. The group consists of three artists of Nigerian heritage and three of Ghanaian heritage. Two of the members, OGD and Kruddz, are the younger brothers of producer Jae5. OGD is also part of a production team named 4PLAY.

NSG released their first single, "Whine and Kotch", in December 2013, and collaborated with English rapper J Hus in 2015. In 2017, NSG released their EP, Grown Up. In 2018, they released the single "Options" featuring Tion Wayne. In 2019, it became their first single to reach the UK Singles Chart at number 7. On 19 June 2020, NSG released their debut mixtape, Roots.

On 9 December 2021, they released an EP titled, Headliner, ahead of their Roots Africa Tour.

== Members ==
- OGD (born Dennis Awotwe-Mensah in London – 13 May 1997)
- Kruddz (born William Awotwe-Mensah in London – 9 March 1995)
- Mojo (born Matthew Temidayo Ojo in London – 31 October 1994)
- Dope (born Patrick Jim Brew in Ghana – 15 August 1997)
- Papii Abz (born Abdul-Jalaal Adeyinka Arowosaye in Nigeria – 17 August 1995)
- Mxjib (born Ayodeji Mujib Shekoni in Nigeria – 7 July 1997)
- HaychB9 (born Haarun Ismail Mohammad Ali in London - 12 January 2009

== Discography ==
=== Studio albums ===
List of studio albums, with selected details and peak chart positions
Title	Details	Peak chart positions
Title	Details	UK
Area Boyz	Released: 20 October 2023; Label: NSG; Formats: Digital download, streaming	28
Sounds of the Diaspora	Released: 26 January 2026	—

=== Mixtapes ===
List of mixtapes, with selected details and peak chart positions
Title	Details	Peak chart positions
Title	Details	UK
Grown Up	Released: 17 April 2017; Label: NSG; Format: Digital download	—
Roots	Released: 19 June 2020; Label: NSG Entertainment; Format: Digital download	37

=== Extended plays ===
Title	Details
Headliner	Released: 9 December 2021; Label: NSG Entertainment; Format: Digital download

=== Singles ===
==== As lead artist ====
List of singles as lead artist, with peak chart positions and certifications
Title	Year	Peak chart positions		Certifications	Album
Title	Year	UK	UK Afrob.	Certifications	Album
"Palava" (featuring Ekeno)	2017	—	×		Non-album singles
"Yo Darlin'" (featuring Geko)	2017	—	×	BPI: Gold	Non-album singles
"Pushing Up" (featuring Not3s)	2018	—	×		Non-album singles
"P.U.T.B."	2018	—	×		Non-album singles
"Natural Disaster"	2018	—	×		Non-album singles
"Options" (featuring Tion Wayne)	2018	7	×	BPI: 2× Platinum	Roots
"OT Bop"	2019	17	×	BPI: Gold	Roots
"Trust Issues"	2019	46	×	BPI: Silver	Roots
"Ourself"	2020	43	×		Roots
"Porsche"	2020	—	×		Roots
"Grandad"	2020	87	1		Roots
"Kate Winslet" (featuring Unknown T)	2020	94	—		Non-album single
"Drunk Guitar" (Solo or featuring Potter Payper)	2021	—	1		Roots
"After OT Bop" (featuring BackRoad Gee)	2021	—	2		Non-album singles
"Colonization"	2021	—	3		Non-album singles
"Petite"	2021	90	1		Non-album singles
"Only God Can Judge Me" (featuring Mist)	2021	—	1		Headliner
"Headliner"	2021	—	1		Headliner
"Suzanna" (featuring Patoranking)	2022	—	—		Headliner
"Roadblock" (featuring LD)	2022	—	8		Non-album singles
"Unruly" (featuring Meekz)	2023	—	—		Non-album singles
"—" denotes a recording that did not chart or was not released in that territory. "×" denotes that the chart did not exist at the time.

==== As featured artist ====
Title	Year	Peak chart positions		Certifications	Album
Title	Year	UK	UK Afrob.	Certifications	Album
"6:30 (Remix)" (Geko featuring NSG)	2018	56	×	BPI: Gold	Non-album single
"Airplane Mode" (Nines featuring NSG)	2020	25	—	BPI: Silver	Crabs in a Bucket
"Surveillance" (Blanco featuring NSG)	2021	—	4		City of God
"Ancestors" (BackRoad Gee featuring NSG)	2021	—	—		Reporting Live (From The Back Of The Roads)
"Don't Play Me" (Shaybo featuring NSG)	2021	—	1		Non-album single
"—" denotes a recording that did not chart or was not released in that territory. "×" denotes that the chart did not exist at the time.

=== Other charted songs ===
Title	Year	Peak chart positions		Certifications	Album
Title	Year	UK	UK Afrob.	Certifications	Album
"Lupita"	2020	—	1		Roots
"MCM"	2020	—	4		Roots
"—" denotes a recording that did not chart or was not released in that territory.

=== Guest appearances ===
Song	Year	Other artist(s)	Album
"Forget A Hater"	2015	J Hus	The 15th Day
"Guestlist"	2021	Frenna	Non-album remixes
"Loyal"	2021	Tion Wayne	Green With Envy
"Plain Clothes"	2021	Potter Payper	Thanks for Waiting
