= Latest Trends =

Single by A1 x J1
- Released: 4 February 2021
- Recorded: 2020–21
- Genre: UK Drill
- Length: 2:38
- Label: EMI
- Songwriters: Joshua Somerkun; Phineas Waweru
- Producer: ShoBeatz

A1 x J1 singles chronology
"Latest Trends" (2021)	"Plugged In" (2021)

Music video
- "Latest Trends" on YouTube

"Latest Trends" is the debut single by UK Drill duo A1 x J1. It was originally previewed in late 2020 before being officially released on 4 February 2021. It later found viral popularity on TikTok before reaching a peak of number two on the UK Singles Chart in March 2021 after being remixed with a version featuring Aitch or a version with A Boogie wit da Hoodie.

== Composition ==
The song has been described by GRM Daily as having "a feel-good vibe with its upbeat, guitar-based production" as well as "clever lyrics including pop culture references and Instagram caption worthy lines". The duo also contribute "smooth vocals from A1 on the chorus and his verse" before "J1 comes through with clever wordplay and bars".

== Charts ==
=== Weekly charts ===
Weekly chart performance for "Latest Trends"
Chart (2021)	Peak position
Australia (ARIA)	68
Belgium (Ultratip Bubbling Under Flanders)	32
Iceland (Tónlistinn)	35
Ireland (IRMA)	10
Netherlands (Single Top 100)	56
New Zealand Hot Singles (RMNZ) Remix with Aitch	25
Sweden (Sverigetopplistan)	61
Switzerland (Schweizer Hitparade)	91
UK Singles (OCC)	2
UK Hip Hop/R&B (OCC)	1

=== Year-end charts ===
Year-end chart performance for "Latest Trends"
Chart (2021)	Position
UK Singles (OCC)	26

== Certifications ==
Certifications for "Latest Trends"
Region	Certification	Certified units/sales
Denmark (IFPI Danmark)	Gold	45,000^{‡}
New Zealand (RMNZ)	Gold	15,000^{‡}
United Kingdom (BPI)	Platinum	600,000^{‡}
^{‡} Sales+streaming figures based on certification alone.
