= Jnr Choi =

Gambian musician and model (born 1999)

- Born: Momodou Junior Choi; 20 May 1999 (age 27); The Gambia
- Genres: Hip hop; trap; world; UK drill
- Occupations: Rapper; singer; songwriter; model
- Instrument: Vocals
- Years active: 2019-present
- Label: Universal Music Group

Momodou Junior Choi, professionally known as Jnr Choi (born 20 May 1999) is a Gambian-British rapper, singer-songwriter and model based in London, United Kingdom. He rose to prominence with his 2021 single "To the Moon", which gained popularity on TikTok and charted worldwide, including peaking at #38 on the US Billboard Hot 100 and #1 on the US Rhythmic chart.

== Early life ==
Jnr Choi was born in The Gambia and relocated to Thamesmead, South-East London where he grew up, before relocating to Southend to pursue a career in modelling.

== Career ==
=== Modelling career ===
Choi started his career as a model where he worked for companies like Givenchy, Philipp Plein, AMIRI and Marcelo Burlon.

=== Musical career ===
After modelling for years, Choi gained an interest in music in 2016 after listening to The Weeknd's 2012 compilation album Trilogy, suggested to him by a friend. He was captivated and inspired, but he didn't record until 2018, when he released his debut single "Moves". Since then he has released multiple singles, including "Undress" featuring Mitchy Iris, "BEVEDERE", and "Reality". His debut studio album SS21 was released in 2021. His breakthrough single "To the Moon", which sampled British singer-songwriter Sam Tompkins's cover of Bruno Mars's 2010 single "Talking to the Moon", was released in October that year. "To The Moon" was later remixed by Gunna, Fivio Foreign and Russ Millions in 2022. His single "Tick Tock" was released the same year. On 25 October 2024 he released his album Summer Flings, a vibrant six-track collection blending Afro and house influences.
