= Body (Russ Millions and Tion Wayne song) =

2021 song by Russ Millions and Tion Wayne

Single by Russ Millions and Tion Wayne

from the album Green with Envy
- Released: 25 March 2021
- Recorded: 2020
- Genre: UK drill
- Length: 3:03
- Label: Grind Don't Stop; Atlantic
- Songwriters: Russ Millions; Tion Wayne
- Producer: Gotcha

Russ Millions singles chronology
"Plugged In" (2021)	"Body" (2021)	"Big Shark" (2021)

Tion Wayne singles chronology
"Deluded" (2020)	"Body" (2021)	"Wow" (2021)

Music video
- "Body" on YouTube

"Body" is a song by British rappers Russ Millions and Tion Wayne, released on 25 March 2021 through Grind Don't Stop and Atlantic Records. The song was produced by Gotcha, and promoted with a TikTok dance challenge, as well as a remix released in April 2021 featuring Bugzy Malone, Fivio Foreign, Darkoo, Buni, ArrDee, E1 (3x3) and ZT (3x3).

The song peaked at the top of the UK Singles Chart, becoming the first UK drill song to top the chart. Outside the United Kingdom, "Body" topped the charts in Australia, Ireland and New Zealand, and peaked within the top ten of the charts in Austria, Czech Republic, Denmark, Greece, the Netherlands, Norway, Sweden and Switzerland. The song also reached the top 20 in Canada, Finland, Iceland, Lithuania, Portugal, Singapore and Slovakia. It was later nominated for the Best Contemporary Song Ivor Novello Award in May 2022.

== Background ==
Russ Millions and Tion Wayne previously collaborated on the 2019 single "Keisha & Becky", which peaked at number seven on the UK Singles Chart. "Body" was described as a boast about wealth "over rapid, clattering beats" in the Evening Standard.

== Critical reception ==
The track was named one of the "14 Songs that Give Us Hope for the Future" by the staff of Vice magazine, with writer Ryan Bassil commenting that another collaboration between the pair was "always going to be good" after "Keisha & Becky".

== Track listing ==
- Digital download
1. "Body" – 3:03
- Digital download
1. "Body" (remix) (featuring ArrDee, E1 (3x3), ZT (3x3), Bugzy Malone, Buni, Fivio Foreign and Darkoo) – 4:38
- Digital download
1. "Body" (remix) (featuring Capo Plaza and Rondodasosa) – 3:25
- Digital download
1. "Body" (remix) (featuring Ricky Rich) – 3:17
- Digital download
1. "Body" (remix) (featuring Murda) – 3:03
- Digital download
1. "Body" (remix) (featuring Jack Harlow) – 2:48

== Charts ==
=== Weekly charts ===
Weekly chart performance for "Body"
Chart (2021)	Peak position
Australia (ARIA)	1
Austria (Ö3 Austria Top 40)	8
Belgium (Ultratop 50 Flanders)	26
Canada Hot 100 (Billboard)	16
Czech Republic Singles Digital (ČNS IFPI)	10
Denmark (Tracklisten)	3
Finland (Suomen virallinen lista)	12
Germany (GfK)	28
Global 200 (Billboard)	11
Greece (IFPI)	5
Hungary (Stream Top 40)	9
Iceland (Tónlistinn)	11
Ireland (IRMA)	1
Italy (FIMI)	29
Lithuania (AGATA)	13
Netherlands (Single Top 100)	3
New Zealand (Recorded Music NZ)	1
Norway (VG-lista)	2
Portugal (AFP)	15
Singapore (RIAS)	19
Slovakia (Singles Digitál Top 100)	15
Sweden (Sverigetopplistan)	4
Switzerland (Schweizer Hitparade)	4
UK Singles (Official Charts)	1
UK Hip Hop/R&B (Official Charts)	1
US Bubbling Under Hot 100 (Billboard)	5
US Hot R&B/Hip-Hop Songs (Billboard)	46

=== Year-end charts ===
Year-end chart performance for "Body"
Chart (2021)	Position
Australia (ARIA)	25
Austria (Ö3 Austria Top 40)	74
Denmark (Tracklisten)	58
Global 200 (Billboard)	173
Hungary (Stream Top 40)	99
Ireland (IRMA)	26
Netherlands (Single Top 100)	88
New Zealand (Recorded Music NZ)	32
Portugal (AFP)	99
Sweden (Sverigetopplistan)	75
Switzerland (Schweizer Hitparade)	45
UK Singles (OCC)	10

== Certifications ==
Certifications for "Body"
Region	Certification	Certified units/sales
Australia (ARIA)	2× Platinum	140,000^{‡}
Canada (Music Canada)	Platinum	80,000^{‡}
Denmark (IFPI Danmark)	Platinum	90,000^{‡}
Italy (FIMI)	Platinum	70,000^{‡}
New Zealand (RMNZ)	3× Platinum	90,000^{‡}
Poland (ZPAV)	Platinum	50,000^{‡}
Portugal (AFP)	Platinum	10,000^{‡}
Spain (Promusicae)	Gold	30,000^{‡}
Switzerland (IFPI Switzerland)	Gold	10,000^{‡}
United Kingdom (BPI)	2× Platinum	1,200,000^{‡}
^{‡} Sales+streaming figures based on certification alone.
