= Dutchavelli =

British rapper

- Also known as: Dutch
- Born: Stephan Allen; 11 November 1993 (age 32); Birmingham, England
- Origin: London, England
- Genres: British hip hop; UK drill
- Occupations: Rapper; songwriter
- Years active: 2016–present
- Labels: Parlophone; Warner

Stephan Allen (born 11 November 1993), better known by his stage name Dutchavelli, is a British rapper. His name comes in part from the fact that he and his family (including his sister, Stefflon Don, a rapper) spent their formative years in Rotterdam, and he initially went under the name 'Dutch'. He has worked with artists such as Stormzy, Gzuz, and Tion Wayne and has achieved Top 40 hits with songs such as "I Dunno", "Burning" and "808", the former peaking at number 7 in the charts.

== Early life ==
Stephan Allen was born in Birmingham to parents of Jamaican descent. He has six siblings including rapper, Stefflon Don and X-factor contestant, Princess Diamz and is the fourth of seven children. When he was a year old, his family moved to Rotterdam, Netherlands, (hence Allen's stage name); around a decade later they moved back to Clapton in Hackney, East London. He cites that instead of sitting around the dinner table to eat they would play each other music ranging from Bob Marley to Aretha Franklin. After first recording in his teens, although he was spurred on by those around him, at age 17 he was handed a six months prison sentence for an unspecified offence which delayed the start of his music career.

== Career ==
Dutchavelli began his career as Dutch in 2016 releasing songs such as 'New Jack City' whilst making appearances on Rinse FM. Further legal trouble involving an armed robbery and stabbing charge in 2018 curtailed his career for another two years while imprisoned on remand. He was later acquitted of the main charge but convicted of perverting the course of justice, and sentenced to 22 months. After being released on licence he began to gain recognition in 2020 with a series of hits which began with 'Only If You Knew' which racked up 20 million views in eight months. Further hits such as 'Surely' alongside collaborations with artists such as Stormzy and M Huncho began to cement his name as one of the leading emerging talents within the drill scene.
Dutchavelli was named on the BBC Sound of... 2021 longlist. 10 artists were nominated by industry experts and artists such as Stormzy, AJ Tracey, and Billie Eilish.

== In popular culture ==
Dutchavelli has gained a reputation for being seen as a tough individual. This, paired with his large stature – he is 6 ft 6 in (1.98 m) in height – has led to a proliferation of memes relating to this within popular culture.

== Personal life ==
Allen converted to Islam in 2022.

== Discography ==
=== Mixtapes ===
List of mixtapes, with selected details
Title	Mixtape details	Peak chart positions	Certifications
Title	Mixtape details	UK	Certifications
Dutch from the 5th	Released: 6 November 2020; Label: 2up2down, Parlophone; Formats: CD, digital download, streaming	8	BPI: Silver

=== Singles ===
==== As lead artist ====
Title	Year	Peak chart positions	Certifications	Album
Title	Year	UK	Certifications	Album
"Speeding"	2017	—		Non-album singles
"Feel The Same" (featuring Krissy)	2017	—		Non-album singles
"Let It Breathe"	2017	—		Non-album singles
"John Wayne"	2018	—		Non-album singles
"Only If You Knew"	2020	95	BPI: Silver	Dutch from the 5th
"Black"	2020	75		Non-album single
"Bando Diaries"	2020	35	BPI: Silver	Dutch from the 5th
"Cool with Me" (featuring M1llionz)	2020	29		Dutch from the 5th
"Never Really Mine"	2020	99	BPI: Silver	Dutch from the 5th
"Zero Zero"	2020	52		Dutch from the 5th
"I'll Call You Back"	2020	63		Dutch from the 5th
"Rumours"	2021	—		Non-album singles
"Circle The Endz"	2021	—		Non-album singles
"Wise Guy"	2021	—		Non-album singles
"Hold On"	2021	—		Non-album singles
"Never Forget You"	2021	99		Non-album singles
"Jason Bourne"	2022	—		Non-album singles
"Robot"	2022	—		Non-album singles
"Done with Singing"	2022	—		Non-album singles
"Bumpy One"	2022	—		Non-album singles
"Voodoo Doctor"	2022	—		Non-album singles
"Welcome to the Party"	2022	—		Non-album singles
"Opp Block" (featuring Fire)	2023	—		Non-album singles
"Brave"	2023	—		Non-album singles
"Purge"	2024	—		Non-album singles
"Fly High" (with Nine Yard)	2024	—		Non-album singles

==== As featured artist ====
List of singles, with year released, selected chart positions, and album name shown
Title	Year	Peak chart positions		Certifications	Album
Title	Year	UK	AUS	Certifications	Album
"All Dem Talk" (Noizy featuring Gzuz and Dutchavelli)	2020	—	—		Non-album singles
"Burning" (GRM Daily featuring M Huncho and Dutchavelli)	2020	13	—	BPI: Gold	Non-album singles
"I Dunno" (Tion Wayne featuring Stormzy and Dutchavelli)	2020	7	—	BPI: Platinum	Non-album singles
"808" (Da Beatfreakz featuring DigDat, B Young and Dutchavelli)	2020	20	—		Non-album singles
"Better" (Onefour featuring Carnage and Dutchavelli)	2020	—	52		Against All Odds
