= Tion Wayne =

British rapper (born 1993)

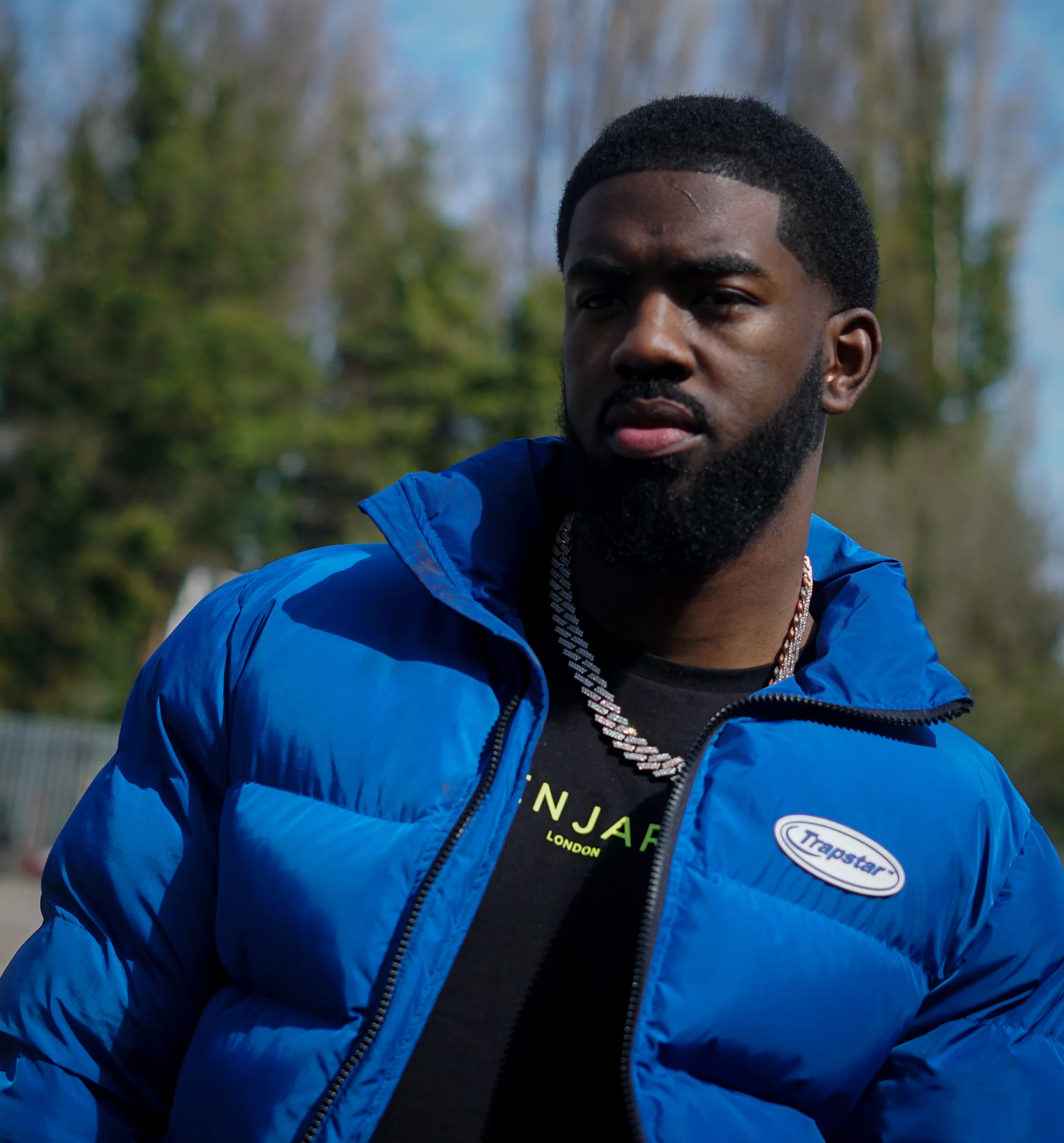

Background information
- Also known as: T Wizzy
- Born: Dennis Junior Odunwo; 1 September 1993 (age 32); Edmonton, London, England
- Genres: UK rap; afroswing; UK drill
- Occupations: Rapper; DJ
- Years active: 2010–present
- Labels: Warner Music UK; Atlantic Records UK

Dennis Junior Odunwo (born 1 September 1993), known professionally as Tion Wayne, is a British rapper and DJ from Edmonton, North London.

He appeared on three top-10 singles on UK Singles Chart as a guest – NSG's "Options", "Keisha & Becky" with Russ Millions and KSI's track "Houdini" – before getting his first top 10 hit as the lead artist with "I Dunno" featuring Dutchavelli and Stormzy, which peaked at number 7, and having his first number 1 with "Body" alongside Russ Millions.

== Early life ==
Dennis Junior Odunwo was born in Edmonton, North London. His parents are Nigerians of Yoruba origin. His mother was a nurse and his father was a computer engineer. He is a middle child and wanted to become an accountant.

== Career ==
Odunwo began to make a name for himself in the music scene in 2010 after dropping a handful of videos on YouTube. By 2014, he had released his first mixtape, titled Wayne's World. Odunwo slowly began building a loyal following. By 2016, he had supported artists such as American rapper Rick Ross and Ghanaian artist Sarkodie. His follow-up mixtape, Wayne's World Vol. 2, was also released that year. In 2017, Odunwo released Transition EP. He made his UK Singles Chart-debut in early 2019 when he was featured on London-based group NSG's single "Options", which peaked at number seven. He also released Wayne's World 3 in 2019. Additional singles that year included "Drive By" featuring Swarmz and "2 on 2" with Jay1.

His single "Keisha & Becky" with fellow British rapper Russ Millions also reached the UK top 10, peaking at number seven. In 2020, Odunwo was featured, alongside rapper and singer Swarmz, and rapper KSI's single "Houdini". The single peaked at number six in the UK Singles Charts. Soon after that, he released his single "I Dunno" featuring Dutchavelli and Stormzy, which also reached the UK top 10, peaking at number seven.

In 2021, Tion Wayne released "Body", a second collaboration with Russ Millions. A remix was released on 22 April. The song charted at number 1 on the UK Singles Chart, becoming the first UK drill song to chart at number 1.

In May 2023, Tion Wayne went to the residence of late rapper Sidhu Moose Wala at his village in Punjab, India. He also went to pay his respect to his parents and film a music video for the song "Healing". Tion Wayne and Moosewala previously collaborated on the track "Celebrity Killer" in 2021.

== Controversies ==
On 4 March 2017, Odunwo was involved in a brawl outside a nightclub in Clifton, Bristol where he was among the performers who had been DJing at the venue. The brawl involved more than 100 people. Odunwo, along with three other men, were sentenced at Bristol Crown Court on 9 November. Odunwo was jailed for 16 months.

On 17 November 2020, Odunwo was involved in an altercation with rapper Headie One on board a flight from Dubai to London which the rapper Morrisson tried to break up shortly after boarding.

=== Highway obstruction ===
Oduwuno was moved along by Derbyshire Police for obstruction of the highway in 2025 while filming a music video at Winnats Pass in a Rolls Royce.

== Discography ==
=== Studio albums ===
List of studio albums, with selected details
Title	Details	Peak chart positions					Certifications
Title	Details	UK	UK R&B/HH	BEL (FL)	IRE	NLD	Certifications
Green with Envy	Released: 17 September 2021; Label: Atlantic; Formats: CD, digital download, streaming, cassette	5	3	164	33	93	BPI: Silver

=== Mixtapes ===
List of mixtapes, with selected details
Title	Year	Peak chart positions
Title	Year	UK
Wayne's World	2014	—
Wayne's World 2	2016	—
T Wayne's World 3	2019	62
"—" denotes a mixtape that did not chart or was not released in that territory.

=== Singles ===
==== As lead artist ====
Title	Year	Peak chart positions										Certifications	Album
Title	Year	UK	UK R&B /HH	AUS	CAN	DEN	IRE	NLD	NZ	POR	WW	Certifications	Album
"Streetz Dem" (with Brandz)	2017	—	—	—	—	—	—	—	—	—	—		Non-album singles
"I'm On" (featuring Kojo Funds)	2017	—	—	—	—	—	—	—	—	—	—		Non-album singles
"Gone Bad" (with Geko and One Acen)	2017	—	—	—	—	—	—	—	—	—	—		Non-album singles
"Cmon" (with Hardy Caprio)	2017	—	—	—	—	—	—	—	—	—	—		Non-album singles
"Home"	2018	—	—	—	—	—	—	—	—	—	—		Non-album singles
"On My Life"	2018	—	—	—	—	—	—	—	—	—	—		Non-album singles
"Sweet Thug" (with One Acen)	2018	—	—	—	—	—	—	—	—	—	—		Non-album singles
"Keisha & Becky" (with Russ Millions)	2019	7	1	—	—	—	44	—	—	—	—	BPI: 2× Platinum; RMNZ: Gold	T Wayne's World 3
"Married to the £"	2019	—	—	—	—	—	—	—	—	—	—		Non-album single
"Drive By" (featuring Swarmz)	2019	57	30	—	—	—	—	—	—	—	—		T Wayne's World 3
"2 On 2" (with Jay1)	2019	53	40	—	—	—	—	—	—	—	—	BPI: Silver	T Wayne's World 3
"2/10" (featuring One Acen)	2019	—	—	—	—	—	—	—	—	—	—		T Wayne's World 3
"4AM" (with Manny Norté, 6lack, Rema featuring Love Renaissance)	2020	—	—	—	—	—	—	—	—	—	—		Non-album singles
"I Dunno" (featuring Dutchavelli and Stormzy)	2020	7	7	—	—	—	30	—	—	—	—	BPI: Platinum; RMNZ: Gold	Non-album singles
"Deluded" (featuring Mist)	2020	26	14	—	—	—	83	—	—	—	—	BPI: Silver	Non-album singles
"Body" (with Russ Millions)	2021	1	1	1	16	3	1	3	1	15	11	BPI: 2× Platinum; ARIA: 2× Platinum; IFPI DEN: Gold; RMNZ: 3× Platinum	Green with Envy
"Wow"	2021	21	8	—	—	—	49	—	— (Note: "Wow" did not enter the NZ Top 40 Singles Chart, but peaked at number 27 on the NZ Hot Singles Chart.)	—	—	BPI: Silver	Green with Envy
"Wid It" (with ArrDee) (Note: "Wid It" is also included on Arrdee's debut mixtape Pier Pressure.)	2021	19	6	—	—	—	41	—	— (Note: "Wid It" did not enter the NZ Top 40 Singles Chart, but peaked at number 12 on the NZ Hot Singles Chart.)	—	—	BPI: Silver	Green with Envy
"Knock Knock" (with M24)	2022	21	8	—	—	—	42	—	— (Note: "Knock Knock" did not enter the NZ Top 40 Singles Chart, but peaked at number 30 on the NZ Hot Singles Chart.)	—	—		Non-album singles
"IFTK" (with La Roux)	2022	6	1	—	—	—	10	—	— (Note: "IFTK" did not enter the NZ Top 40 Singles Chart, but peaked at number 20 on the NZ Hot Singles Chart.)	—	—	BPI: Platinum; RMNZ: Gold	Non-album singles
"Let's Go" (featuring Aitch)	2022	30	11	—	—	—	84	—	— (Note: "Let's Go" did not enter the NZ Top 40 Singles Chart, but peaked at number 11 on the NZ Hot Singles Chart.)	—	—		Non-album singles
"Healing"	2023	35	15	—	—	—	—	—	— (Note: "Healing" did not enter the NZ Top 40 Singles Chart, but peaked at number 24 on the NZ Hot Singles Chart.)	—	—		Non-album singles
"Amen" (featuring Nines)	2023	43	18	—	—	—	—	—	—	—	—		Non-album singles
"Lowkey (LDN Drift)" (with Hedex featuring Takura)	2024	— (Note: "Lowkey (LDN Drift)" did not enter the UK Singles Chart Top 100 but debuted at number 97 on the UK Singles Downloads Chart Top 100.)	—	—	—	—	—	—	— (Note: "Lowkey (LDN Drift)" did not enter the NZ Top 40 Singles Chart, but peaked at number 13 on the NZ Hot Singles Chart.)	—	—		Non-album singles
"We Won" (with Russ Millions)	2024	—	—	—	—	—	—	—	—	—	—		Non-album singles
"Cola" (with Nathan Dawe)	2026	—	—	—	—	—	—	—	—	—	—		
"—" denotes a recording that did not chart or was not released in that territory.

==== As featured artist ====
Title	Year	Peak chart positions						Certifications	Album
Title	Year	UK	UK R&B/HH	AUS	IRE	NLD	NZ Hot	Certifications	Album
"Gyaldem Sugar" (Mazi Chukz featuring Tion Wayne)	2017	—	—	—	—	—	—		Non-album singles
"Hot Property" (Team Salut featuring Tion Wayne, Afro B and Eugy)	2017	—	—	—	—	—	—		Non-album singles
"Options" (NSG featuring Tion Wayne)	2018	7	3	—	52	—	—	BPI: 2× Platinum	Roots
"Trendy" (Cadet featuring Ay Em and Tion Wayne)	2018	—	—	—	—	—	—		Non-album singles
"Bally" (Swarmz featuring Tion Wayne)	2019	32	16	—	—	—	—	BPI: Silver	Non-album singles
"London" (M24 featuring Tion Wayne)	2020	32	16	—	—	—	—	BPI: Silver	Non-album singles
"Houdini" (KSI featuring Swarmz and Tion Wayne)	2020	6	5	— (Note: "Houdini" did not enter the Australian Singles Chart, but debuted at number 36 on the Australian Hip Hop/R&B Singles Chart.)	11	—	3	BPI: Silver	Dissimulation
"Moncler" (Tinie featuring Tion Wayne)	2020	—	—	—	—	—	—		Non-album singles
"Last Night" (B Young featuring Tion Wayne)	2020	—	—	—	—	—	—		Non-album singles
"Come Over" (Rudimental featuring Anne-Marie and Tion Wayne)	2020	26	—	—	—	—	—	BPI: Gold	Ground Control
"Celebrity Killer" (Sidhu Moose Wala featuring Tion Wayne)	2021	—	—	—	—	—	—		MooseTape
"Blama" (Steel Banglez featuring Tion Wayne and Morrisson)	2021	94	—	—	—	—	—		Non-album singles
"Night Away (Dance)" (A1 x J1 featuring Tion Wayne)	2022	11	4	83	21	42	26	BPI: Gold; RMNZ: Gold	Non-album singles
"Suffer" (GRM Daily featuring Giggs and Tion Wayne)	2022	—	—	—	—	—	—		Non-album singles
"Je M’appelle" (Benzz featuring Tion Wayne & French Montana)	2022	—	—	—	—	—	—		Non-album singles
"—" denotes a recording that did not chart or was not released in that territory.

=== Other charted songs ===
Title	Year	Peak chart positions		Album
Title	Year	UK	NZ Hot	Album
"Rock Dat" (featuring Polo G)	2021	—	35	Green with Envy
"Who's True" (with Jae5 and Davido)	2021	50	—	Green with Envy
