= Russ Millions =

British rapper (born 1996)

- Also known as: Russ; RussMB; Russ Splash
- Born: Shylo Batchelor Ashby Milwood; 20 March 1996 (age 30); Deptford, London, England
- Genres: British hip hop; UK drill
- Occupations: Rapper; songwriter
- Years active: 2016–present
- Labels: One of a Kind Music; Since 93
- Formerly of: SMG
- Website: russmillions-ooak.co.uk

Shylo Batchelor Ashby Milwood (born 20 March 1996), known professionally as Russ Millions (formerly Russ, Russ Splash or RussMB), is an English rapper and songwriter. In December 2018 he released his single "Gun Lean" on Virgin Records. The track peaked at number 9 on the UK Singles Chart, becoming the first UK drill track to reach the top 10. Russ Millions has collaborated with Buni, Taze, Tion Wayne, Digga D, Pressa, LD and Dappy.

The dance that Russ performs in the music video became a "dance craze" and was mimicked by footballers including Jesse Lingard. It was ranked by The Guardian at number 10 on their list of "greatest pop music dance crazes".

In April 2019 his follow-up single "Keisha & Becky" with Tion Wayne entered the UK Singles Chart at number 19, and later peaked at number seven. The song was later certified Platinum by the British Phonographic Industry (BPI). As a lead, he had his first number 1 with "Body" alongside Tion Wayne.

== Discography ==
=== Mixtapes ===
- One of a Kind (2023)
- Shylo (2024)

=== Extended plays ===
- Russ Hour (2020)
- My Son: The EP (2020)

=== Singles ===
List of singles, with selected chart positions, showing year released and album name
Title	Year	Peak chart positions					Certifications	Album
Title	Year	UK	AUS	IRE	NZ	SWE	Certifications	Album
"Gun Lean"	2018	9	—	49	—	—	BPI: Gold	
"Keisha & Becky" (with Tion Wayne)	2019	7	—	44	—	—	BPI: 2× Platinum; RMNZ: Gold	
"Mr Sheeen" (with Digga D)	2019	28	—	—	—	—		
"VidaLoca" (with Pressa and Taze)	2019	—	—	—	—	—		
"OMG" (with LD)	2019	—	—	—	—	—		
"Splash" (with Dappy)	2020	78	—	—	—	—		
"Killy Killy" (featuring Jon Z and Quada)	2020	—	—	—	—	—		
"Playground Finale"	2020	—	—	—	—	—		
"Plugged In" (with Fumez the Engineer)	2021	—	—	—	—	—		
"Body" (with Tion Wayne)	2021	1	1	1	1	4	BPI: 2× Platinum; ARIA: 2× Platinum; RMNZ: 3× Platinum	Green With Envy
"Big Shark"	2021	54	—	90	— (Note: "Big Shark" did not enter the NZ Top 40 Singles Chart, but peaked at number 37 on the NZ Hot Singles Chart.)	—		TBA
"6:30"	2021	53	—	95	—	—	BPI: Silver	TBA
"Money Calling" (with Da Beatfreakz, Raye and wewantwraiths)	2021	48	—	—	—	—	BPI: Silver	TBA
"Drive (Remix)" (with Ayo Beatz, Clean Bandit, Chip, Wes Nelson, Topic & French the Kid)	2021	17	—	—	—	—		Non-album singles
"Reggae & Calypso" (with Buni and YV)	2022	12	—	17	— (Note: "Reggae & Calypso" did not enter the NZ Top 40 Singles Chart, but peaked at number 13 on the NZ Hot Singles Chart.)	—	BPI: Gold	Non-album singles
"Backseat"	2022	97	—	—	— (Note: "Backseat" did not enter the NZ Top 40 Singles Chart, but peaked at number 31 on the NZ Hot Singles Chart.)	—		One of a kind
"6am in Dubai" (with Buni and YV)	2022	100	—	—	—	—		One of a kind
"Baba (Toma Tussi)"	2022	42	—	74	— (Note: "Baba (Toma Tussi)" did not enter the NZ Top 40 Singles Chart, but peaked at number 25 on the NZ Hot Singles Chart.)	—		One of a kind
"Pisces" (featuring Krept and Konan)	2022	78	—	—	—	—		One of a kind
"Canarsie" (with Fivio Foreign)	2024	—	—	—	38	—		Non-album single
"We Won" (with Tion Wayne)	2024	—	—	—	—	—		TBA
"—" denotes a recording that did not chart or was not released in that territory.
