= Feltham Prison and Young Offender Institution =

Prison for adult males and juveniles in west London, England

Coordinates: 51.44051°N 0.43530°W

HMP & YOI Feltham
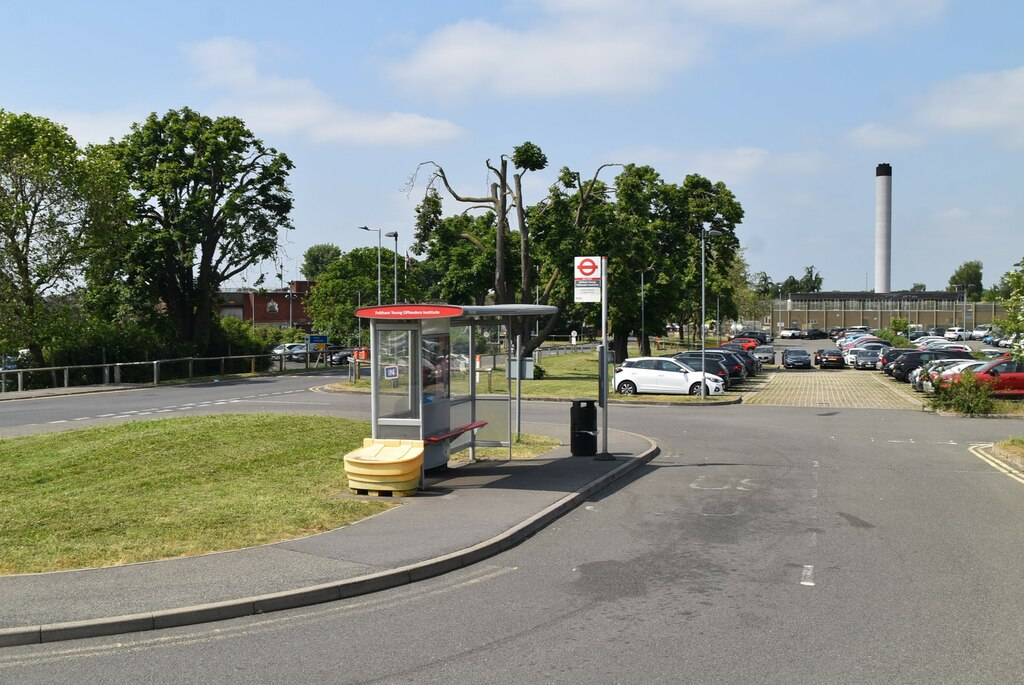
- Entrance to Feltham Young Offenders Prison in 2023
- Interactive map of HMP & YOI Feltham
- Location: Feltham, London
- Security class: Juveniles/Category C Adult male
- Capacity: 768
- Population: 498 (2018-19 fiscal year (on average))
- Opened: 1910; 116 years ago
- Managed by: HM Prison Services
- Governor: Paul Crossey Feltham B
- Website: Feltham at justice.gov.uk

Feltham Young Offenders Institution (more commonly known as HM Prison & YOI Feltham) is a prison for adult males over 18 and juveniles between 15 and 18, occupying 0.184 square kilometres (45 acres) south-west of Feltham in the London Borough of Hounslow, in west London, England. It is operated by His Majesty's Prison Service.

== History ==
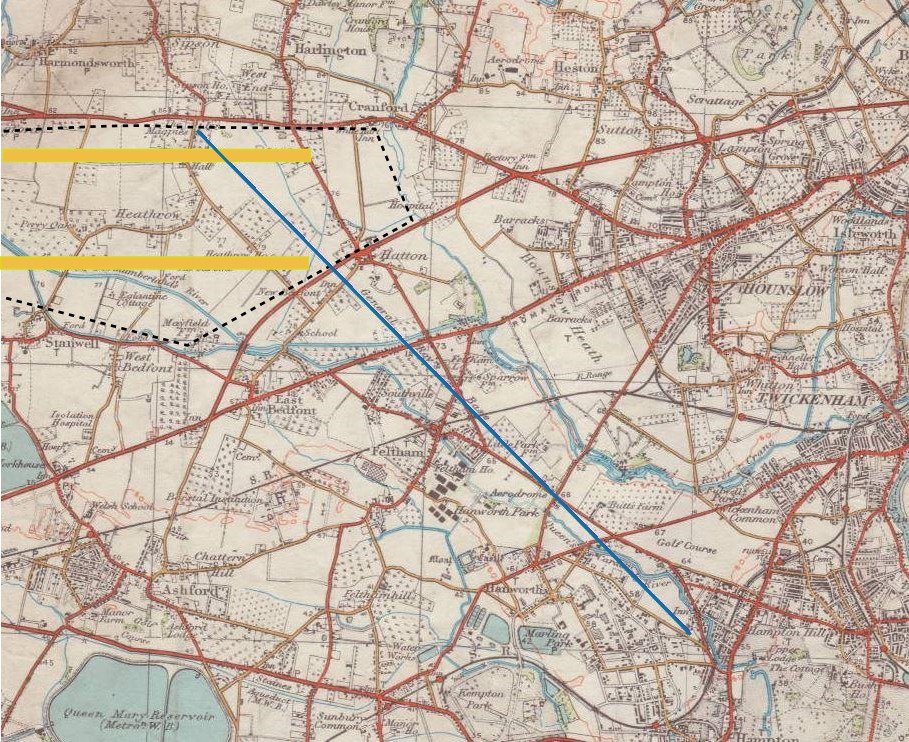
Map showing "Borstal Institution" to the west of Feltham (c. 1935)

The original Feltham institution was built after 1857 and opened on 1 January 1859 as an Industrial School and was taken over in 1910 by the Prison Commissioners as their second Borstal institution. The existing building opened as a Remand Centre in March 1988.

The current institution was formed in 1991 as a result of a merger between Feltham Borstal and the Ashford Remand Centre. It is managed directly by His Majesty's Prison Service, rather than management being contracted out to a private firm.

Publicity of a pre-2005 wave of violence at the Institution was coupled with alleged racism amongst certain officers. These reports took as case-in-point the murder of Zahid Mubarek by racist cellmate Robert Stewart on the day Mubarek was due for release. Proposals made to distance HMP Feltham from its reputation included a renaming such as to 'HMP Bedfont Lakes'; receiving scant support. The site falls in the parish (and thus historic civil parish) of Feltham, rather than Bedfont.

An inspection by HM Chief Inspector of Prisons was made in May 2005. The 2005 Report highlighted the progress made and praised the effective reception and induction procedures, the Outreach Team that deal with self-harm issues and the measures in place to deal with race relations issues. Voluntary sector work takes place within Feltham; its Voluntary Sector Co-ordinator manages performance of more than 25 agencies for those convicted and placed on remand (detained pending a trial).

Another inspection was made in July 2013 which was critical of what was considered "an excessive use of force" by prison staff in some incidents which had taken place in 2012 and "unacceptably high levels of violence" in the institution. The Howard League for Penal Reform said that the report revealed the prison to be a "frightening, violent, ineffective and astoundingly costly institution".

On 4 September 2013, the Ministry of Justice announced that it was undertaking a feasibility study on replacing the existing buildings at Feltham with a new larger adult prison and youth detention centre.

A 2014 inspection of the prison found that progress had been made in some areas but there were still some major concerns such as levels of violence remaining high, although with fewer incidents than previously, and prisoners having a lack of activities available and being kept locked up in cells for long periods.

The prison is making inroads towards pacifying inmates with violence indicators who self-identify as violent gang members and behave, initially, accordingly. Among three ex-prisoners who came forward to the BBC in 2015, one reported seeing another having his head being stamped on. Feltham in 2015 was the most violent prison in England and Wales having hosted 894 attacks/fights so serious and demonstrable that proportionate, prescribed, legal punishments were imposed. Among these, inmates who have committed acts of violence may be kept in their own accommodation for 23 hours a day, seeing one hour free from solitary confinement. Officers knew of 48 gangs in 2015 among "the teenagers" (changing population) of Feltham's interned.

== The prison today ==
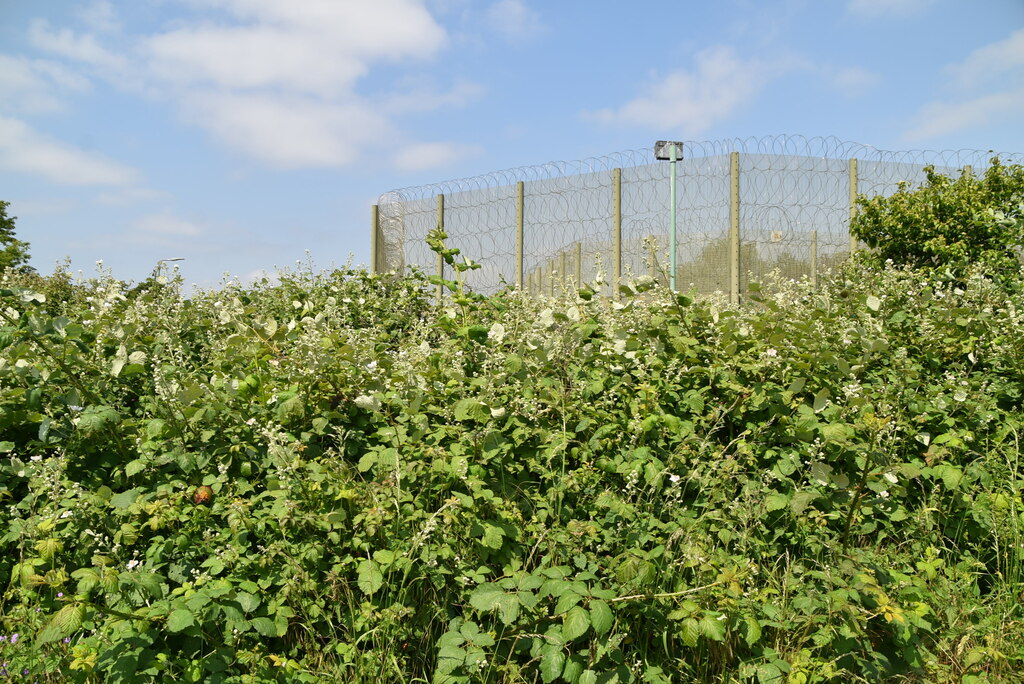
Exterior fence in 2023

Adults and juveniles occupy different residential units on different sides of the prison. Since 2024, following the appointment of a dedicated Governor to HMP Feltham B, each side has been governed by a separate Governor and senior team. Units housing adult offenders on Feltham B hold up to approximately 56 prisoners. Units housing juveniles on Feltham A hold up to 30 prisoners. Almost all the juvenile rooms are for single occupation. There is a mixture of double and single accommodation for adults (mostly double). All rooms have integral sanitation and TV and all areas operate the IEP scheme (incentives and earned privilege scheme).

The prison's regime includes education (full/part-time), workshops, vocational training in the construction industry, farms and gardens, works, and NVQs. Various types of offending behaviour groups are available. Other features include the use of voluntary agencies, one-to-one teaching, substance misuse work, and pre-release courses.

An unannounced inspection of 2017 found that the juvenile units, taken together were not safe for either staff or boys, and that violence had increased in the section for older young men; prompting a Commons debate. A serious assault on a staff member took place during the inspection. The prison was criticised for the 23-hour detention, in that although exercise was possible, showers were not on those days, and sought to improve this. Health care was good and mental health care impressive. Efforts to resettle offenders back in the community after release were also good.

According to a July 2024 report by His Majesty's Chief Inspector of Prisons, HMP Feltham A, the prison's youth facility which houses inmates as young as 15 years old, is the most violent prison in all of England and Wales.

Following a September 2025 inspection of HMP Feltham B the chief inspector praised the new governor for "reinvigorating the establishment" but work was required to improve outcomes for prisoners. HMP Feltham B was also praised for the lifting of restrictions on movement for prisoners in conflict, regular searching to reduce the availability of weapons, and improved incentives to encourage prisoners to behave well, which were all starting to improve the culture of the jail.

== Notable and former inmates ==
- Mark Acklom, conman and fraudster.
- Mohammad Amir, cricketer convicted for his part in the Pakistan cricket spot-fixing controversy.
- Digga D, rapper.
- Ghetts, well-renowned grime artist was sent to Feltham for robbery aged 16, when he was released in 2003 he immediately began pursuing a musical career.
- J Hus, rapper.
- Zahid Mubarek, inmate murdered by his cellmate at Feltham.
- Lee Murray, mixed martial arts fighter jailed for 10 years for masterminding a 2006 £53 million armed raid.
- Oliver Postgate, after he declared himself a conscientious objector (from his early childhood in 1942, former).
- Crazy Titch, grime MC who is currently serving a life sentence for murder.
- Steve Peregrin Took, musician and songwriter, best known as the percussionist in Tyrannosaurus Rex, convicted in 1969 for possession of drugs. His account of his time detained can be heard on Mick Farren's album Mona - The Carnivorous Circus.
- Topiary (hacktivist), real name, Jake Davis. The spokesperson and PR man of the hacking groups Anonymous and LulzSec. According to his Twitter feed, Davis was sent to Feltham and served 37 days.
- Richard Reid, the so-called "shoe bomber" who pleaded guilty to terrorism charges, is alleged to have converted to Islam whilst serving time in Feltham.
- SJ, or Jayden O'Neil Crichlow, rapper from OFB, is currently serving time.
- Sneakbo, rapper from Brixton, served time in Feltham for threatening a woman.
- Sneakz, or Shane Lyons, a cold rapper from NPK.

== In popular culture ==
- Hard-Fi track Feltham is Singing Out refers to the prisoners.
- Grime artist JME refers to Feltham in his track Tottenham.
- Televised film Scum (1979) typifies the violence of many such institutions before a key stage of national reform, its broadcasting unwillingly was delayed to match that reform.
- Frosty's track County Lines featuring OFB rappers Bandokay and Double Lz. Bandokay mentions a person listed above: "Slim Jim just called from Feltham."
- Silky's track “Sticks and Stones” refers to the Feltham young offenders unit
