= Frontstreet (album) =

Mixtape by OFB
- Released: 14 November 2019
- Length: 36:14
- Label: Rattrap Reality
- Producer: Beats By Lucas; Cash; M1OnTheBeat; Ghosty; Skyes; K6; TK Beats; Zxch; MONEY MOVEMENTS; MobzBeatz

OFB chronology
Frontstreet (2019)	Drill Commandments (2021)

Singles from Frontstreet
- 1. "Ambush" Released: 5 May 2019; 2. "Youngest in Charge" Released: 2 June 2019

Frontstreet is the debut mixtape by British hip-hop collective OFB, consisting of rappers SJ, Bandokay and Double Lz. The mixtape was released on 14 November 2019 under Rattrap Reality; the name of the mixtape is derived from a part of the Broadwater Farm estate in Tottenham.

The mixtape peaked at number 36 on the UK Albums Chart and 97 on the Irish Albums Chart. The mixtape was certified silver by the British Phonographic Industry, as was the track "Ambush".

== Reception ==
Thomas Gorton, writing for Dazed, wrote:

Frontstreet is a confrontational listen, but one that transports its audience straight into their world, which is an accurate reflection of young gang life in austerity Britain...this is not an album about individual struggle, but rather about life itself in inner-city London, a no-holds-barred depiction of lives spent growing up around violence.

== Track listing ==
All tracks are written by OFB.

No.	Title	Producer(s)	Length
1.	"LISTEN UP, PT 2"	Beats by Lucas; Cash	2:32
2.	"DING DONG"	M1OnTheBeat	3:00
3.	"WHO'S THAT"	Ghosty	2:21
4.	"AMBUSH"	Sykes	3:35
5.	"GLIDERS (INTERLUDE)"	K6	1:59
6.	"LOOSING SCREWS"	TK Beats	2:49
7.	"ASH DEM" (ft. Lowkey)	Zxch	3:23
8.	"HORRID"	Ghosty	3:49
9.	"YOO"	MONEY MOVEMENTS	2:31
10.	"ONCE IN A WHILE" (ft. Headie One)	Sykes	4:02
11.	"YOUNGEST IN CHARGE" (ft. SJ)	MobzBeatz	3:27
12.	"MAZZA" (ft. MITCH)	M1OnTheBeat	2:46
Total length:			36:14

== Charts ==
Chart	Peak position
UK Albums (OCC)	36
Irish Albums (IRMA)	97

== Certifications ==
Certifications and sales for Frontstreet
Region	Certification	Certified units/sales
United Kingdom (BPI)	Silver	60,000^{‡}
^{‡} Sales+streaming figures based on certification alone.

== Awards and nominations ==
Year	Award	Nominated work	Category	Result	Ref.
2020	GRM Daily Rated Awards	Frontstreet	Mixtape of the Year	Nominated	
