= Tottenham Mandem =

British street gang from Broadwater Estate with Jamaican links

- Founded: 1970s
- Founding location: Tottenham, North London
- Years active: 1970s to mid-2000s
- Territory: Tottenham and South Tottenham, in North London
- Ethnicity: British Jamaican,Jamaican (Yardies)
- Membership (est.): 100+ Yardies
- Criminal activities: Drug trafficking, weapon trafficking, armed robbery, kidnapping and contract killing
- Allies: Broadwater Farm Posse, Burger Bar Boys, Causeway Gang, Edmonton Firm (also known as The Firm, Edmonton Mandem, or EMD), Star Gang
- Rivals: Northumberland Park Killers (NPK), Hackney Boys, London Field Boys (LFB)

The Tottenham Mandem (also Tottenham Man Dem, TMD, or Man Dem Crew, formerly known as Frontliners or Tottenham Boys) were an organised street gang based in Tottenham, North London, that began on the Broadwater Farm estate prior to the Broadwater Farm riot in 1985. One of the early members and later leader Mark Lambie was a suspect in the murder of PC Keith Blakelock during that riot. Lambie had been top of Operation Trident's wanted list due to the close links he had built with gangs in Wembley, Harlesden and south London. He was jailed in 2002. During the 90s, TMD was one of the largest gangs in North London and controlled much of the drug markets in the area.

In the early 2000s, members of TMD formed the North Star record label and music group. The group was active in the music scene at the time, and acted as promoters for So Solid Crew. TMD also declined during this period, instead splintering off into various independent groups such as NPK (Northumberland Park Killers), Tiverton Mandem, and Chestnut Estate (CE, also known as Black Gang), although some still used the "Tottenham Mandem" name. Some younger members of TMD began to associate with the London Bloods (Note: Some gangs during the 2000s took on "Bloods" names and imagery in the UK, but they were not officially associated with the American Bloods gangs from which they took inspiration.) and used names such as Ida Boys (also known as Ida Rydaz, Ida Bloodstarz, or IDA), and Bloodline or Bloodgang, whereas some older members began to use the name 'Star Gang'. Collectively, everyone from the Broadwater Farm estate began to be referred to as 'Farm Mandem' (FMD).

Some of these groups, such as Star Gang, became active in the road rap scene at the time. Two members of Star Gang, Headz (now known as Headie One) and Young RV (now known as RV), later became prominent in the UK drill scene and formed part of the UK drill collective OFB (Original Farm Boys).

== History ==
=== Origins: 1970s–90s ===
TMD, like many other London gangs such as the Peckham Boys and Ghetto Boys, has its origins in the 1970s and was founded in Broadwater Farm, Tottenham. By the time of the infamous Broadwater Farm riot in 1985, the gang was firmly established in the area. The gang is a derivative of another local gang known as the Broadwater Farm Posse, formed in the 1970s by Black British youth of West Indian origins. TMD originally went by the name "Frontliners", then later "Tottenham Boys", then finally 'Tottenham Mandem".

=== 1990s: rise of Mark Lambie ===
By the early 1990s, TMD was one of the largest gangs in North London, controlling many of the drug markets in the area. One leader of TMD, Mark Lambie (also known as "Devil Man", "Obeah Man", or the "Prince of Darkness"), was a suspect in the murder of PC Keith Blakelock during the Broadwater Farm Riot. Lambie helped forge links and alliances with gangs across London and beyond. In 1991, he was sentenced to 3 1/2 years in jail due to involvement in a gang shooting, although this was reduced a year. In 1995, police intelligence reports indicated he had been fraternizing with gang members from Brent and Notting Hill. He also had a feud with Jerome Maddix, who had experienced a drive-by shooting at his home and was murdered a year later in Jamaica.

In 1996, police believed Mark and an associate, Clifford Angol, may have been involved in the non-fatal shooting of Kenneth Wowe in West London. The following year, three gunmen entered a Caribbean restaurant in West London called The Place To Be and asked to see Mark. While it is suspected Mark Lambie was there at the time, he kept quiet if he was. Instead, two innocent Marks were shot after identifying themselves. Police suspected this may have been an attempted retaliation shooting following the shooting of Kenneth Wowe. Six months later, Kenneth Wowe was shot dead. Mark and Clifford were promptly arrested, but let go due to lack of evidence. A few days later, Clifford Angol was shot dead.

In 1999, a man was shot in Colosseum nightclub in Vauxhall. The victim named Mark Lambie as the shooter, who was then arrested, but once again was let go after the victim withdrew his evidence. In the same year, police believed he and an associate, Michael Thomas (aka Mallet), had shot at an EQ nightclub in Hackney Marsh. Police suspected this was a form of blackmail. There was a third incident at a Hackney club where Stephen Grant was shot dead. Police suspected this was a part of the TMD and Hackney Boys dispute. Lambie was suspected of being at the club.

=== 1997–2003: Hackney Boys rivalry ===
In 1997, TMD had a conflict with another local gang known as the Hackney Boys (also known as Hackney Mandem, or HMD). The conflict resulted in a number of tit-for-tat killings. The origins of the feud aren't clear; in the book Guns and Gangs: The Inside Story of the War on our Streets by Graeme McLagen, it is claimed the conflict began when 16-year-old Guydance Dacres was shot dead in 1997 at a Chimes nightclub in Hackney. It was Guydance's first night out at a club ever. Anthony Bourne, member of TMD allies Edmonton Firm, and Fabiann Fatinikun were both acquitted of the murder. James Sutherland however, a former police officer, has stated the death of Guydance was not the cause of the conflict behind TMD and the Hackney Boys and the killings that followed. The conflict may have begun earlier, in 1995/6, when members of TMD robbed youths from Hackney, and one TMD member had stabbed a Hackney Boy member.

Either way, a month after the death of Guydance Dacres, members of the Hackney Boys confronted two members of TMD, Clint Ponton (also known as C1 or The Chosen One, later member of North Star) and 16-year-old Kingsley Iyasara (nicknamed Popcorn), and chased them. Clint escaped, but Kingsley was cornered on a block of flats, beaten, kicked, punched and ultimately shot and killed. Kingsley ultimately bled to death on the roof of the block of flats. Two of the individuals involved in the murder of Kingsley Iyasara, Meneliek Robinson and Corey Wright, were themselves shot dead soon after they were released from prison in 1999 and 2001 respectively.

There was another incident at a Hackney nightclub in 1999 where Stephen Grant was shot dead. Police suspected this was a part of the TMD and Hackney Boys dispute. Two days later, a Hackney youth was shot at by members of TMD in Southgate.

On 4 December 2002, TMD member Adrian Crawford (aka Buckhead) was shot dead by Hackney Boys member Daniel Cummings. Adrian had previously been arrested alongside Mark Lambie while visiting an associate in jail.

On 21 April 2003, Jason Fearon was shot at in a London club. He tried to flee in his Audi but was shot at again and killed. Police were told this was due to a conflict between TMD and the Hackney Boys. The club was hosting an event at the time for So Solid member Lisa Maffia. Clint Ponton was arrested in connection with the shooting. He denied all the charges and claimed he was trying to change his life. After beating the case, he came back to the UK and decided to focus on his music group North Star.

=== 2000–2002: Fall of Mark Lambie ===
By 2000, Mark Lambie was considered untouchable by the local black community. Some people in the local community believed he was capable of juju powers and was untouchable due to magic. This earned him the nickname "Obeah Man", named after an African spiritual system. He was top of Operation Trident's wanted list due to the close links he had built with gangs in Wembley, Harlesden in Brent, and south London. While Trident struggled to find evidence to convict Lambie, they managed to convict two of his associates, Michael Thomas (aka Mallet) and Ricky Sweeney. In order to prevent his girlfriend from testifying against him, Ricky Sweeney had her shot. She was also shot at while on a visit to Jamaica. Ultimately she survived and aided the police in testifying against Ricky. Ricky was jailed for life for an execution he took part in, in 1999. Police were also struggling because they did not actually know where Mark Lambie was or where he lived, which made traditional methods of gathering information on someone somewhat difficult. Instead, police used similar tactics American police used when going after Al Capone, by going after his associates. Police also found that Mark was living in South London, rather than North as was expected, and that he was using false names, such as 'Paul Gordan'. Eventually, they managed to find him and his brother, Wesley Lambie, in a car that was suspected to be stolen (although the owner refused to testify it was). They also found heroin in the car but were unable to link it to the Lambie brothers. Although they were unable to bring charges, knowing where he was made surveillance now a possibility.

In 2002, Mark Lambie and Anthony "Blue" Bourne (a member of the North London gang "The Firm") were jailed after the kidnapping, blackmailing, and torture of two men, Mr Smith and Mr Morris, from Tottenham on 21 April 2001. The police had been following Lambie around Tottenham on the day and saw him enter and leave Broadwater Estate. It was considered too risky to enter the Estate, so they waited outside until Mark left, and followed him to a party. Nothing eventful happened, so they returned to the police station. What they didn't know was that an associate of Mark, Anthony Bourne, had lured two men into Broadwater Estate, where they were kidnapped at gunpoint by at least 14 people. The two men had driven a blue sports car into the estate, which the police had spotted earlier as they were following Mark. The group took the two men into a house, which they burst into, ordering the current occupants (two women and two children) to move downstairs, and then began to torture the two men, demanding money from them both. The house they had entered was the same house the police had seen Mark enter earlier in the day, which the police had interpreted to be a party.

The men were hit with hammers, burned with an electric iron, and had boiling water poured onto their genitals. One of the victims, Mr Smith, was able to escape after suggesting there was money at a nearby salon. He was bundled into a car, and driven to the salon, which was promptly robbed while Mr Smith was secured in the boot of the car. While the suspects were inside the salon, Mr Smith was able to escape from the car and ran to the nearby police station. After his escape, the gang began to flee. They took Mr Morris outside but were seen by a passing police car. The gang fled, and Mr Morris ran towards a police car he had spotted passing by and lunged onto the bonnet asking for help.

Two other members of the gang that were involved in the incident, Warren Leader and Francis Osei, were also convicted of kidnapping and blackmail. Warren Leader was released in 2009, but in 2013 he was jailed for 16 years for running a heroin factory.

In October 2003, Gavin Smith was killed in Lordship Recreation Ground. Mark Duggan, member of TMD off-shoot Star Gang, was arrested in suspicion of the murder. He was released without charge however. In March 2004, Marcus Cox, a TMD member, was shot dead on Tottenham High Road. He was shot by Syron Martin. The prosecution alleged it was revenge for a robbery that had happened prior. Syron alleged that Cox had threatened to kill him if he did not give Cox money. He alleged that he brought a gun and body armour for protection, and on seeing Cox in public, "lost his head" and shot him.

=== North Star music group ===
In 2002/3, Clint Ponton travelled to Ayia Napa. While there, he met up with Megaman from So Solid and became inspired to form his own music group. While still in Ayia Napa, both Clint Ponton and Wesley Lambie were allegedly involved in a stabbing incident. The charges were dropped, but they were convicted and fined for carrying knives.

On 21 April 2003, Jason Fearon was shot at in a London club. He tried to flee in his Audi but was shot at again and killed. The club was hosting an event at the time for So Solid member Lisa Maffia. Clint Ponton (also known as C1 or The Chosen One) was arrested in connection of the shooting. He denied all the charges and claimed he was trying to change his life.

Clint Ponton and Wesley Lambie formed a music collective called North Star or NorthStar. Clint Ponton and Wesley Lambie formed the NorthStar music record label, promotion, and production company. The group started putting on UK garage events and acted as the promoters for UK garage crew So Solid. The group also started booking events for Wiley. Clint has stated the success of So Solid inspired him to refocus on music. The group also became associated with PDC. C1 stated he created it as he wanted to change around his life and move to more legitimate things. North Star had 3 artists that acted as a music group together, C1, Chyna, and Young Spray. Together, they were signed to Lisa Maffia's Maffia Records record label. The group went to number 1 on the Channel U charts with the song "On A Rise". Young Spray had met C1 when he was 16 while both were in prison.

North Star received some resistance from police who shut down their music shows.

In 2008, Clint was stabbed in the neck at the Urban Music Awards in what was suspected by police to be a part of a Tottenham gang conflict.

=== Fragmentation and development ===
The early 2000s saw a decline in TMD. Tottenham became less unified and local independent gangs propped up. Meanwhile, members of NorthStar pursued their careers in music. Killings also dropped during this period, but the rivalries continued through music with rival groups sending disses towards each other (such as Mash Town from London Fields).

Some of the Tottenham split-offs from TMD were Ida Boys, NPK (Northumberland Park Killers), Chestnut Estate (CE, also known as Black Gang), and Tiverton Mandem. 'Star Gang' was also formed during this period, created by older members of TMD. The name 'Star Gang' was allegedly influenced by "North Star", the music group set up by former TMD members during the early 2000s. Some of the younger members of TMD had begun to associate with the London Bloods movement and began calling themselves Ida Boys (also known as Ida Rydaz, Ida Bloodstarz, or IDA), Bloodline or Bloodgang, and BWF (Broadwater Farm).

Some groups still referred to themselves as the "Tottenham Mandem" regardless, but the term no longer referred to a specific gang. Collectively, some of the fragmentations were all known as "Farm Mandem" (FMD), and they still had links to older TMD members.

Some of these groups, such as Star Gang, became active in the road rap scene at the time. Two members of Star Gang, Headz (now known as Headie One) and Young RV (now known as RV), later became prominent in the UK drill scene and formed part of the UK drill collective OFB (Original Farm Boys).

In the mid-late 2000s, members of TMD became associated with the Ghetto Boys, a gang based in South London. Younger members of the Ghetto Boys had formed "Shower". Together, members of TMD and the Ghetto Boys called themselves "Shower Syndicate". It is alleged the group had links with the Jamaican gang Shower Posse. In 2009, two members of TMD were giving life sentences after murdering someone in South London.

=== Late 2000s-present ===
==== NPK/Sin Squad ====
NPK (Northumberland Park Killers), also known as Sin Squad, are a split-off group from TMD located in the Northumberland Park estate of Tottenham. It is identified using the colour purple.

In 2007, a fight occurred between members of the NPK and the Shankstarz, a gang from neighbouring Edmonton, following an attempted ambush on two Shankstarz members; the ambush was revenge for the attack of an NPK member at a club in Forest Gate. The fight involved up to 20 people near Hertford Road. In 2009, 6 members of the NPK and 5 members of the Shankstarz were sentenced for the fight.

In 2009, NPK members were imprisoned for the murder of Gary Guthrie and ongoing violence between the NPK and the Shankstarz, including the attempted murder of Jerome "Smallman" Bruce-de-Rouche.

In 2011, Bienvenu Vangu, a member of the rival Wood Green Young Guns, attacked 2 members of NPK with an axe. He would plead guilty to violent disorder, attempted wounding with intent and possession of a sharp-pointed article in a public place, and was sentenced to 6 years in prison, in addition to a 4-year license. In August the same year, Steven Grisales, an architecture student from Argentina, was stabbed to death by Ochaine Williams, a NPK member. Williams would be sentenced to 10 1/2 years in prison; naming restrictions for Williams were lifted in October. His sentence would later be extended to 12 years.

In 2014, Corrine Allen was sentenced to 2 years in prison, suspended for 2 years, for driving Jermaine Nimoh, an NPK member, for the purpose of drug dealing. Nimoh was sentenced to 2 years and 9 months for possession with intent to supply. It was also noted in a report by the Integrated Gangs Unit in Haringey that there was increased tensions between the NPK and the Farm Mandem.

On 3 February 2018, Kwabena Nelson, also known as Kobi and a former member of NPK, was stabbed to death by members of the Wood Green Mob (WGM) following them crashing into his car. Neron Quartey would be sentenced to a minimum of 26 years in August for involvement in his death. Some weeks later, on 8 March, Kelvin Odunuyi - also known as Lampz or DipDat- was shot to death outside the Vue cinema in Wood Green. It was assumed that Lampz's death was retaliation for the death of Kobi. As of August 2021, no one has been convicted for Lampz's murder.

Roughly one month following the death of Lampz, on 2 April, Tanesha Melbourne-Blake was shot and killed alongside Chalgrove Road in Tottenham. The shooting was linked to the WGM-NPK conflict, with several posts tagged with "#NPK" making references to the death of Melbourne-Blake. It was alleged that the murder was a revenge attack following a rapper from Wood Green, named Bobby Slater, being attacked at a restaurant in Farringdon. The Sun offered a £50,000 reward for information regarding her killer. In 2020, it was determined that the gun used in Melbourne-Blake's murder was used in another murder.

In 2020, members of NPK, alongside SJ of OFB, were sentenced to life for the murder of Kamali Gabbidon-Lynck, also known as K1, and the attempted murder of Jason Fraser, both affiliated with the WGM.

NPK is also associated with the UK drill music scene, with their members having released songs with accompanying music videos. Rappers that go under the "Sin Squad (SS)" collective include Stewie, Bully B, GP, Uncs, KayyKayy, Tugga, MLoose, and LR. Tyrell "Trills" Graham and Shane "Sneakz" Lyons are also members of Sin Squad, however they are currently incarcerated for the murder of Gabbidon-Lynck.

==== OFB ====
OFB (Original Farm Boys) is the current gang associated with the Broadwater Farm Estate. They were preceded by Star Gang, a road rap group from the 2000s, an offshoot group from TMD which consisted of Headz (now known as Headie One) and Young RV (now known as RV), who later became prominent in the UK drill scene and formed part of the UK drill collective OFB.

In 2020, SJ, alongside four others (Sheareem Cookhorn, Tyrell "Trills" Graham, Shane "Sneakz" Lyons, and Ojay "O'Sav" Hamilton), was given a life sentence with a minimum of 21 years, following a court case at the Old Bailey for the murder of Kamali "K1" Gabbidon-Lynck in Wood Green. The group was said to be linked to the NPK. In protest of the sentence, Carl Stanbury, an electrician and alleged stepfather of Sneakz, jumped from the public gallery; he would be sentenced to 7 months in jail for doing so. SJ's sentence would later be reduced to a minimum of 19 years in 2021, which was announced via his Instagram account.

In 2022, Bandokay, Double Lz and others were charged with violent disorder following a 2021 brawl at a Selfridges store, where two people were stabbed.

== Operation Dibiri ==
In January 2014, it was reported that the Metropolitan Police had set up Operation Dibri to tackle the TMD. Detective Chief Inspectors Mark Foote stated the gang had "48 of Europe's most dangerous criminals", which he claimed included Mark Duggan. The operation, live since November 2008, saw police "conducting a confidential covert proactive operation" in a bid to arrest the most senior members of a gang whose "line of business" involved the supply of class A drugs, firearms, kidnapping, blackmail and grievous bodily harm. In 2011, the TMD ranked second on the Met's Organised Crime Network matrix, making them the second most harmful gang in the capital. "TMD members and their associates are regularly attending nightclubs and parties in the London area and when doing so have firearms either on their person or nearby with their associates," a police report from 25 July 2011 said.

== Mark Duggan ==
In August 2011, Mark Duggan, a 29-year-old Tottenham resident, was shot and killed by the Metropolitan Police in Tottenham, north London. Officers were attempting to arrest Duggan, who was suspected to be carrying a gun. The circumstances of Duggan's killing resulted in public protests in Tottenham that were widely seen as the proximate cause of the 2011 England riots. During the inquiry into his killing, police claimed that he was a member of the Tottenham Mandem.
