= On Deck (song) =

Song by Abra Cadabra

Single by Abra Cadabra
- Released: July 16, 2020
- Producers: RA$H & Rxckson

Abra Cadabra singles chronology
"Cadabra Freestyle" (2020)	"On Deck" (2020)	"Spin this Coupe" (2020)

"On Deck" is a song by Abra Cadabra. It was released as a single in 2020 and peaked at number 32 on the UK singles chart.

== Charts ==
Chart (2020)	Peak position
UK Singles (OCC)	32

== Nominations ==
Year	Award	Nominated work	Category	Result	Ref.
2021	GRM Daily Rated Awards	"On Deck"	Track of the Year	Nominated	
