= Broadwater Farm =

Area of Tottenham, London, England

Coordinates: 51.5946°N 0.0822°W

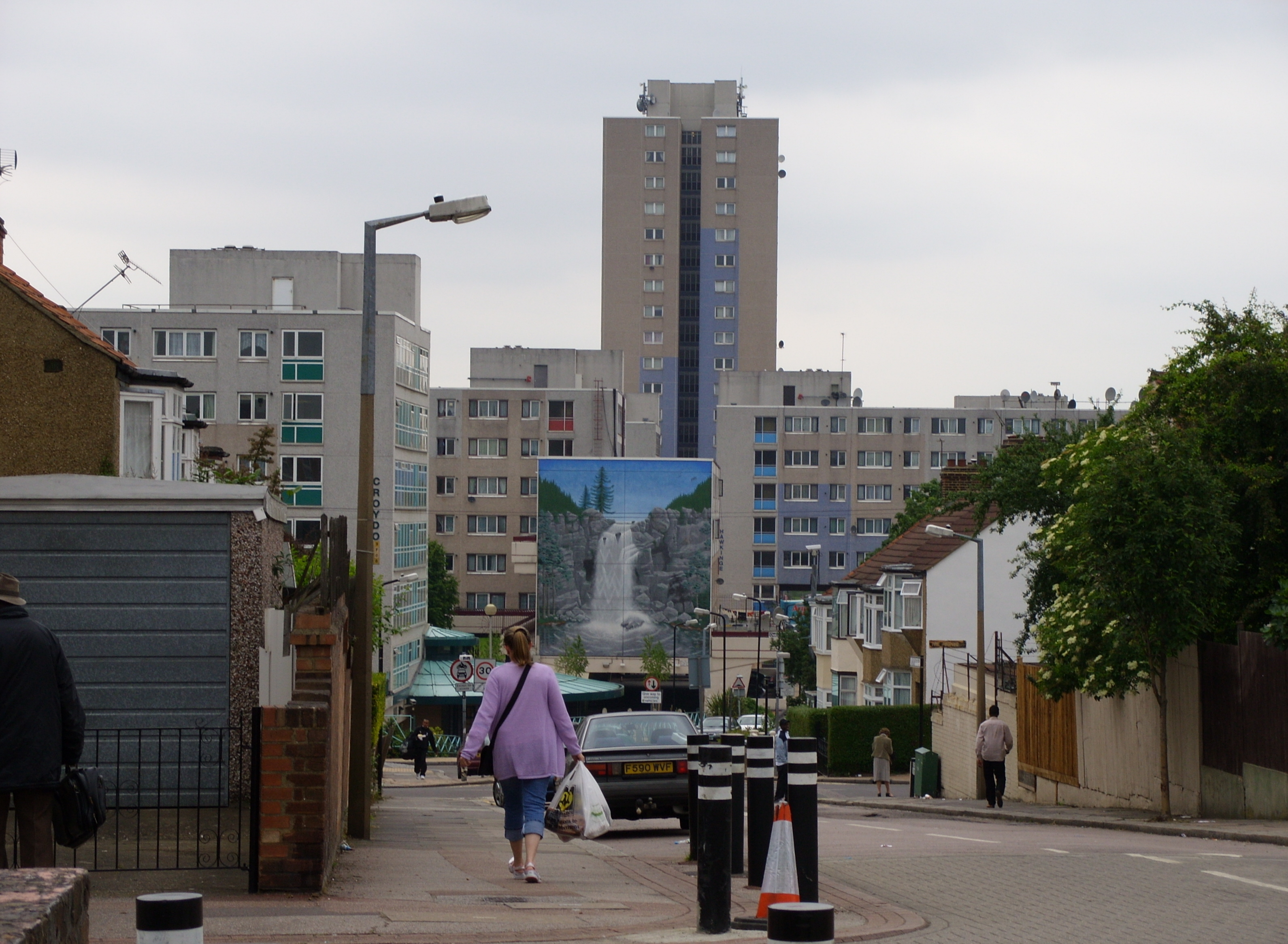

- Location within Greater London
- Population: 4,844
- OS grid reference: TQ3282590211
- London borough: Haringey
- Ceremonial county: Greater London
- Region: London
- Country: England
- Sovereign state: United Kingdom
- Post town: LONDON
- Postcode district: N17
- Dialling code: 020
- Police: Metropolitan
- Fire: London
- Ambulance: London
- UK Parliament: Tottenham
- London Assembly: Enfield and Haringey

Broadwater Farm, often referred to simply as "The Farm", is an area in Tottenham, North London, straddling the River Moselle. The eastern half of the area is dominated by the Broadwater Farm Estate ("BWFE"), an experiment in high-density social housing, loosely based on Corbusian ideas, dominated by concrete towers connected by walkways (the controversial, so-called "Streets in the sky"), built in the late 1960s using cheap but fire-vulnerable pre-fabricated concrete panels. The western half of the area is taken up by Lordship Recreation Ground, one of north London's largest parks. Broadwater Farm in 2011 had a population of 4,844. The estate is owned by Haringey London Borough Council.

Following the publication of Alice Coleman's Utopia on Trial in 1985, the area acquired a reputation as one of the worst places to live in the United Kingdom. This perception was exacerbated when serious rioting erupted later that year.

After the 1985 riot there was a major redevelopment programme, after which crime rates initially fell. However, it is still associated with gangs with numerous stabbings and other violent crime occurring in and around the area.

Well known for its large Afro-Caribbean heritage, it is one of the most ethnically diverse locations in London; in 2005 its official population of 3,800 included residents of 39 different nationalities.

Broadwater Farm was completed in the early 1970s and built using the same Taylor Woodrow-Anglian system of prefabricated panels as Ronan Point. In June 2018, following tests conducted after the Grenfell Tower fire, Haringey Council announced hundreds of families would have to be evacuated because eleven of the towers are at risk of catastrophic collapse in the event of a fire. At least two may have to be demolished.

== Location ==
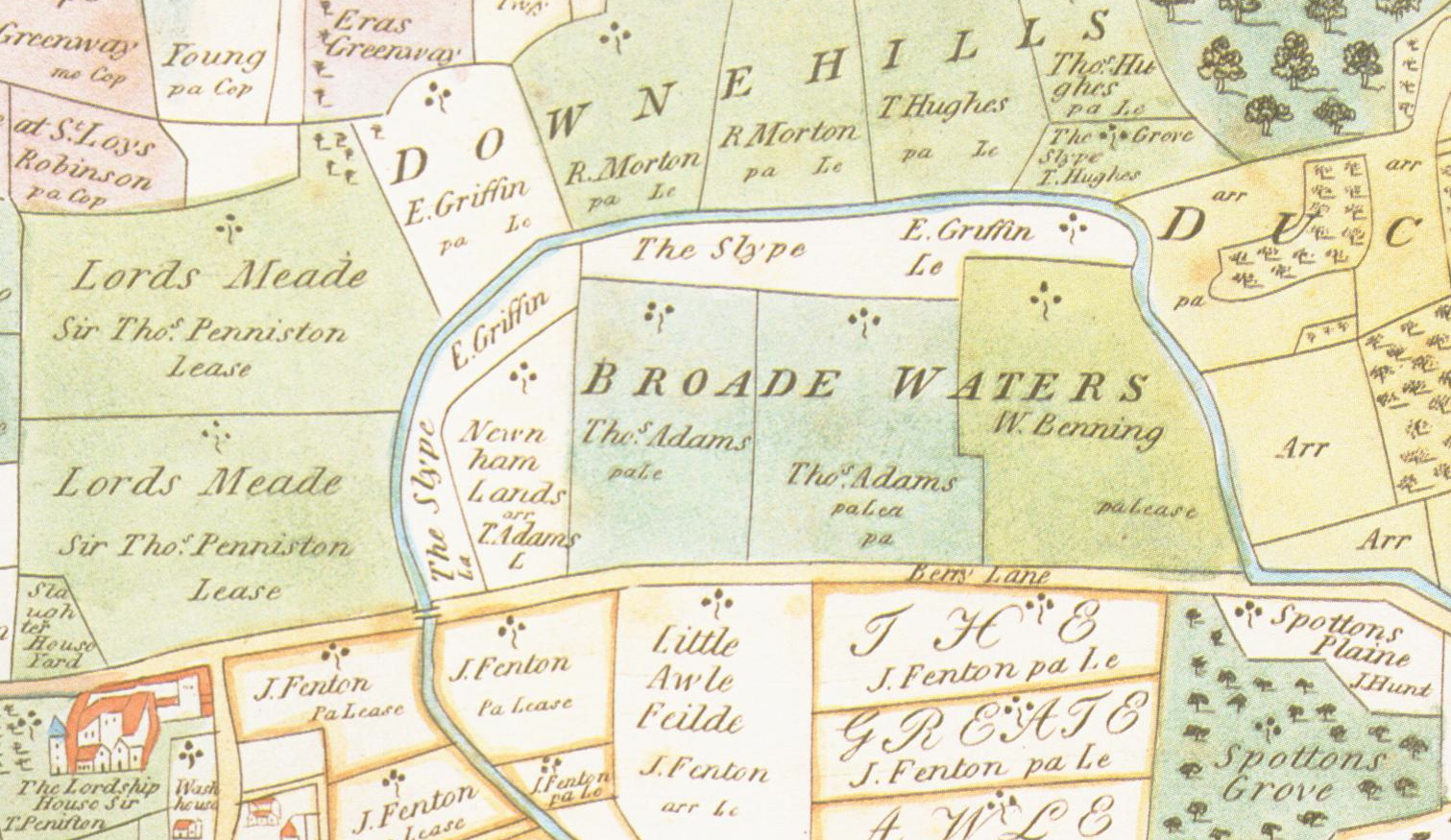
The Moselle valley, 1619 (South shown at the top of the map).

Broadwater Farm is situated in the valley of the Moselle, approximately six miles (ten kilometres) north of the City of London. It is situated in a deep depression immediately south of Lordship Lane, between the twin junctions of Lordship Lane and The Roundway. It is immediately adjacent to Bruce Castle, approximately 550 yards (500 metres) from the centre of Tottenham, and 1 1/4 miles (2 kilometres) from Wood Green.

== History ==
=== Early history ===
Until the opening of the nearby Bruce Grove railway station on 22 July 1872 the area was still rural, although close in proximity to London and the growing suburb of Tottenham. Aside from a small group of buildings clustered around neighbouring Bruce Castle, the only buildings in the area were the farmhouse and outbuildings of Broadwater Farm, then still a working farm.

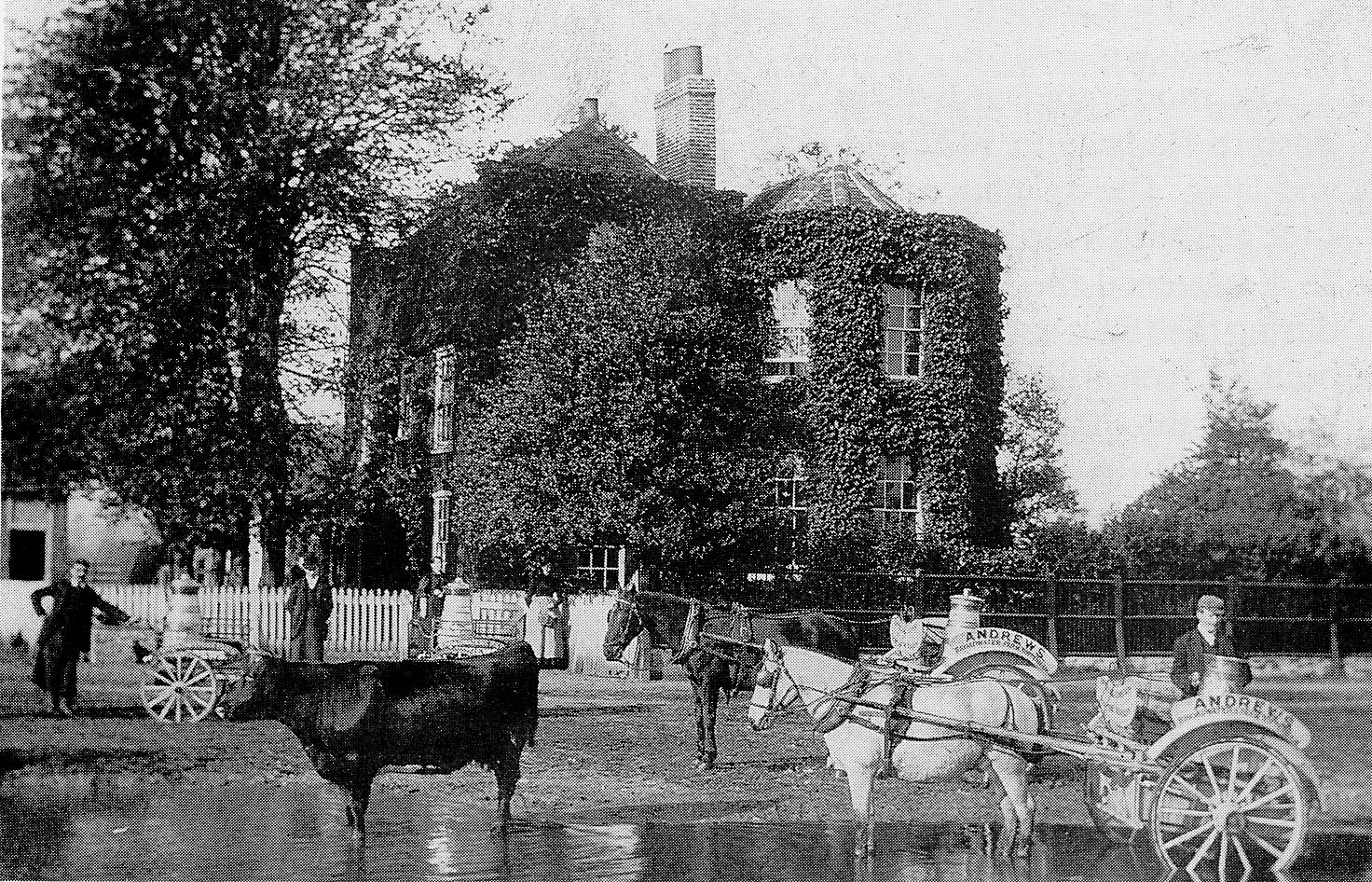
Broadwater Farm, 1892

Following construction of the railways to Tottenham and Wood Green, suburban residential development in the surrounding area took place rapidly. However, due to waterlogging and flooding caused by the River Moselle, Broadwater Farm was considered unsuitable for development and remained as farmland. By 1920, Broadwater Farm was the last remaining agricultural land on Lordship Lane, surrounded by housing on all sides.

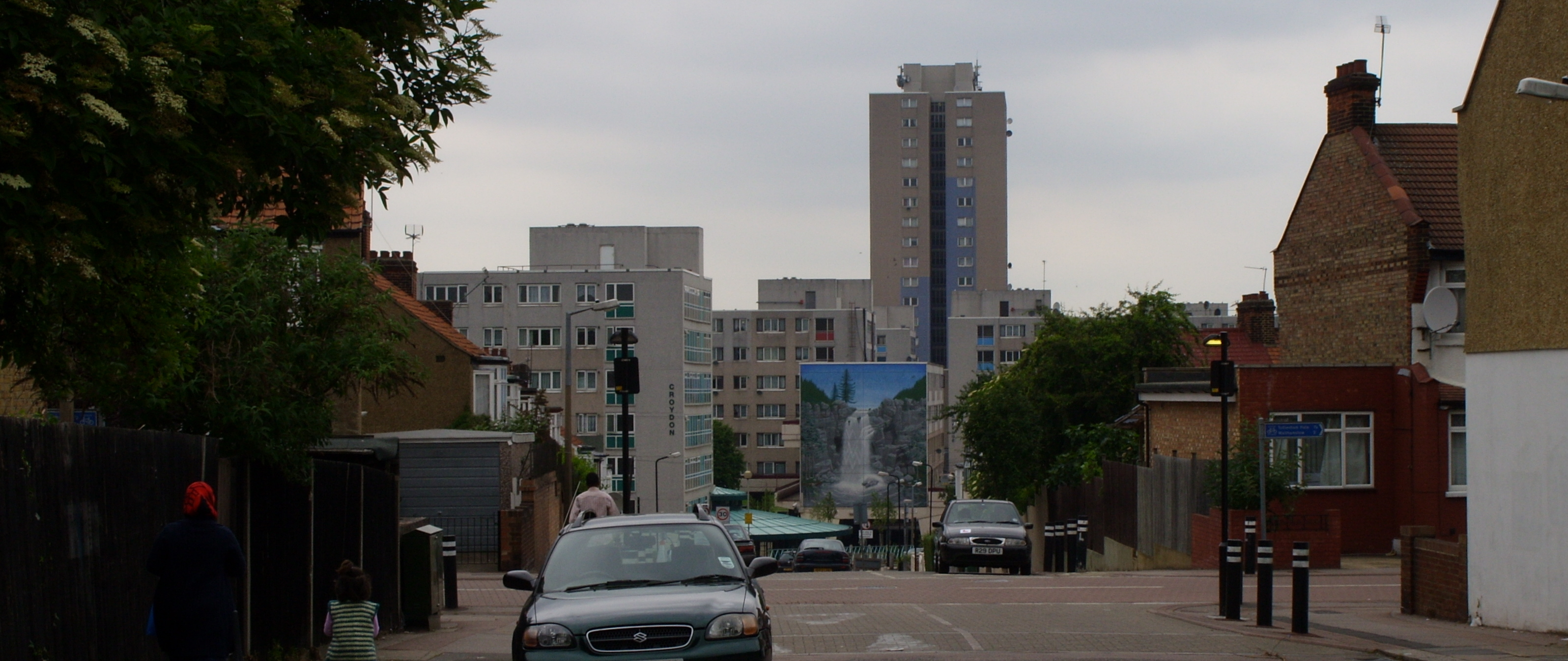
Despite being deep in the Moselle valley, the Estate dominates the area. The mural on the Debden building is more than twice the height of the neighbouring Victorian houses.

In 1932 Tottenham Urban District Council purchased Broadwater Farm. The western half was drained and converted for recreational use as Lordship Recreation Ground, while the eastern half was kept vacant for prospective development and used as allotments. Heavy concrete dykes were built to reduce flooding of the Moselle in Lordship Recreation Ground, whilst on the eastern half of the farm, the river was covered to run in culvert as far as Tottenham Cemetery.

=== Broadwater Farm Estate ===
In 1967, construction of the Broadwater Farm Estate began on the site of the allotments. An area of the southeastern part of the park was used to replace the allotments destroyed by the new construction. As initially built, the estate contained 1,063 flats, providing homes for 3,000–4,000 people. The design of the estate was loosely inspired by Le Corbusier, and characterised by large concrete blocks and tall towers.

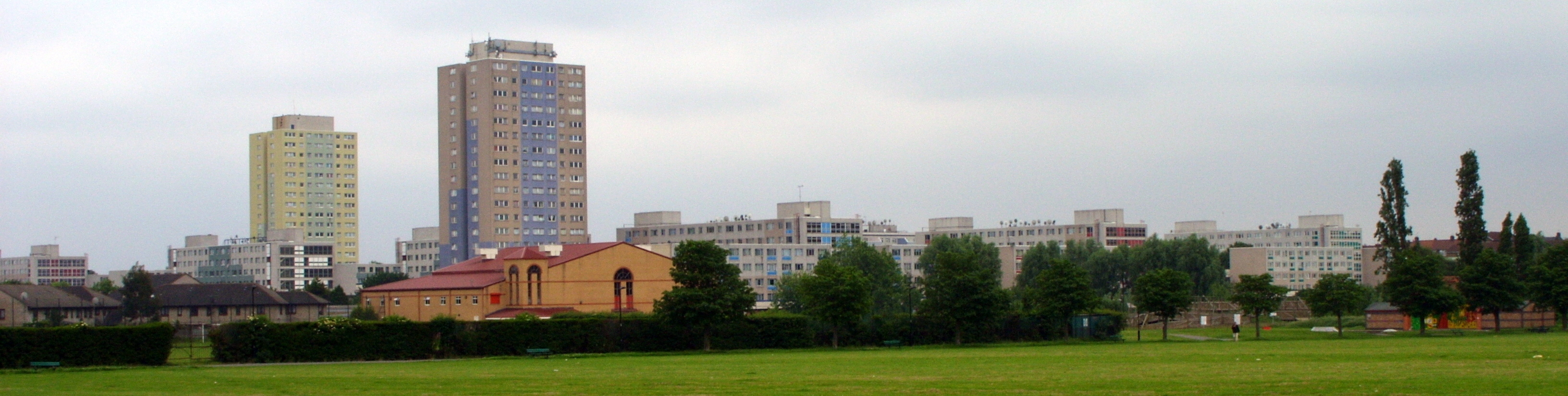

Because of the high water table and the flood risk caused by the Moselle, which flows through the site, no housing was built at ground level. Instead, the ground level was entirely occupied by car parks. The buildings were linked by a system of interconnected walkways - the "streets in the sky" - at first floor level known as the "deck level". Shops and amenities were also located on the deck level. While this reduced flood risk for residences and businesses, it resulted in there being no "eyes on the street" at ground level, and decreased the feeling of community. As in similarly-designed developments, the walkways and especially the stairwells could not be seen by anyone elsewhere, so there was no deterrent to crime and disorder; no "eyes on the street" as advocated by Jane Jacobs in her book The Death and Life of Great American Cities.

The 12 interconnected buildings were each named after a different World War II RAF aerodrome. The most conspicuous buildings are the very tall Northolt and Kenley towers, and the large ziggurat-shaped Tangmere block.

=== Deterioration ===
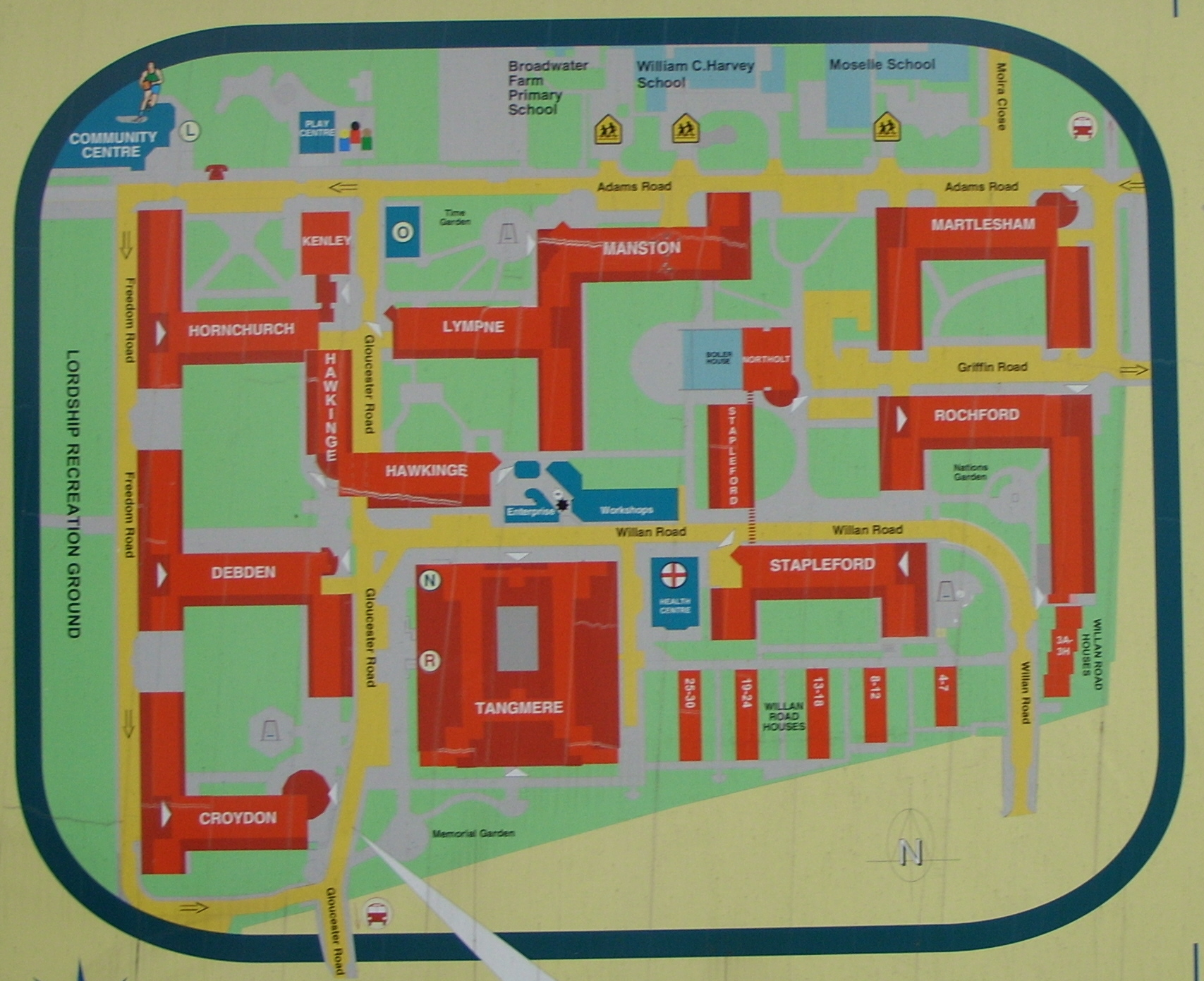
Layout of the Broadwater Farm Estate

By 1973, problems with the estate were becoming apparent; the walkways of the deck level created dangerously isolated areas which became hotspots for crime and robbery, and provided easy escape routes for criminals. The housing was poorly maintained by authorities. It suffered badly from water leakages, pest infestations (including a serious outbreak of cockroaches) and electrical faults. More than half of the people offered accommodation in the estate refused it, and the majority of existing residents had applied to be re-housed elsewhere.

In 1976, less than ten years after the estate opened, the Department of the Environment concluded that the estate was of such poor quality that the only solution was demolition. While residents objected to conditions on the estate, some also opposed the demolition plan. Relations between the community and the local authority became increasingly confrontational. A process of redevelopment began in 1981, but was hampered by a lack of funds and an increasingly negative public perception of the area.

==== Utopia on Trial ====
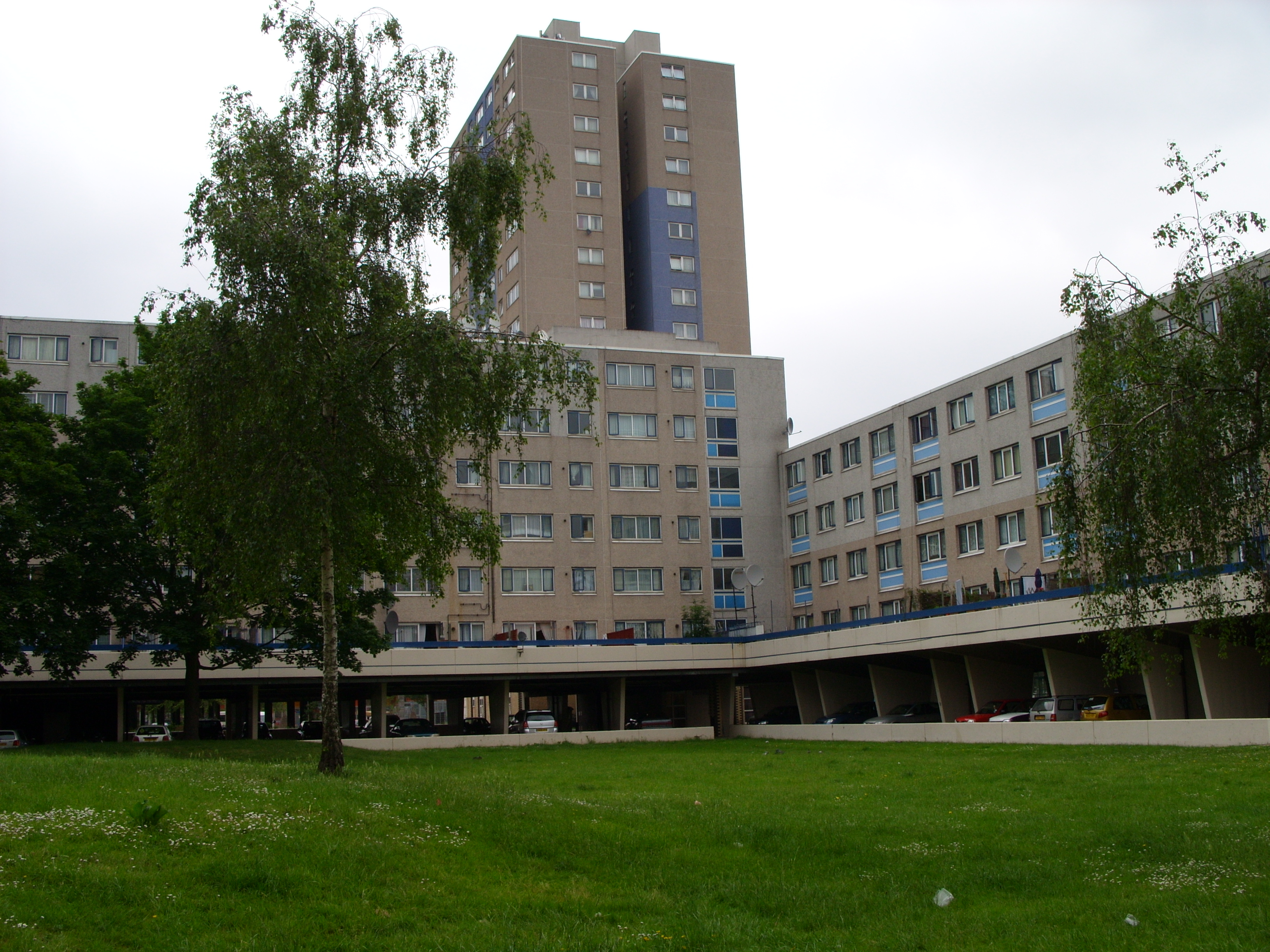
Hawkinge block, showing the building constructed on a deck of stilts above the floodplain, and the remnants of the deck-level walkway running along the first floor.

By the time Alice Coleman's critique of 1960s planned housing, Utopia on Trial (1985), was published, the estate was regarded as being representative of unsuccessful large-scale social housing projects. When a major exhibition by Le Corbusier in the mid-1980s was unable to attract sponsorship, the refusal of sponsors to be associated with his name was attributed to the "Broadwater Farm factor".

The book's criticism of alleged "lapses of civilised behaviour" on Le Corbusier-inspired estates, claiming that residents of such buildings were far more likely to commit and to be victims of anti-social behaviour, were highly influential on the Thatcher government. Although the book focused on Tower Hamlets and Southwark and did not discuss Broadwater Farm, by the time it was published, the estate was becoming synonymous with this type of housing. The government began to put pressure on Haringey London Borough Council to improve the area.

==== Tenants' Association and the Youth Association ====
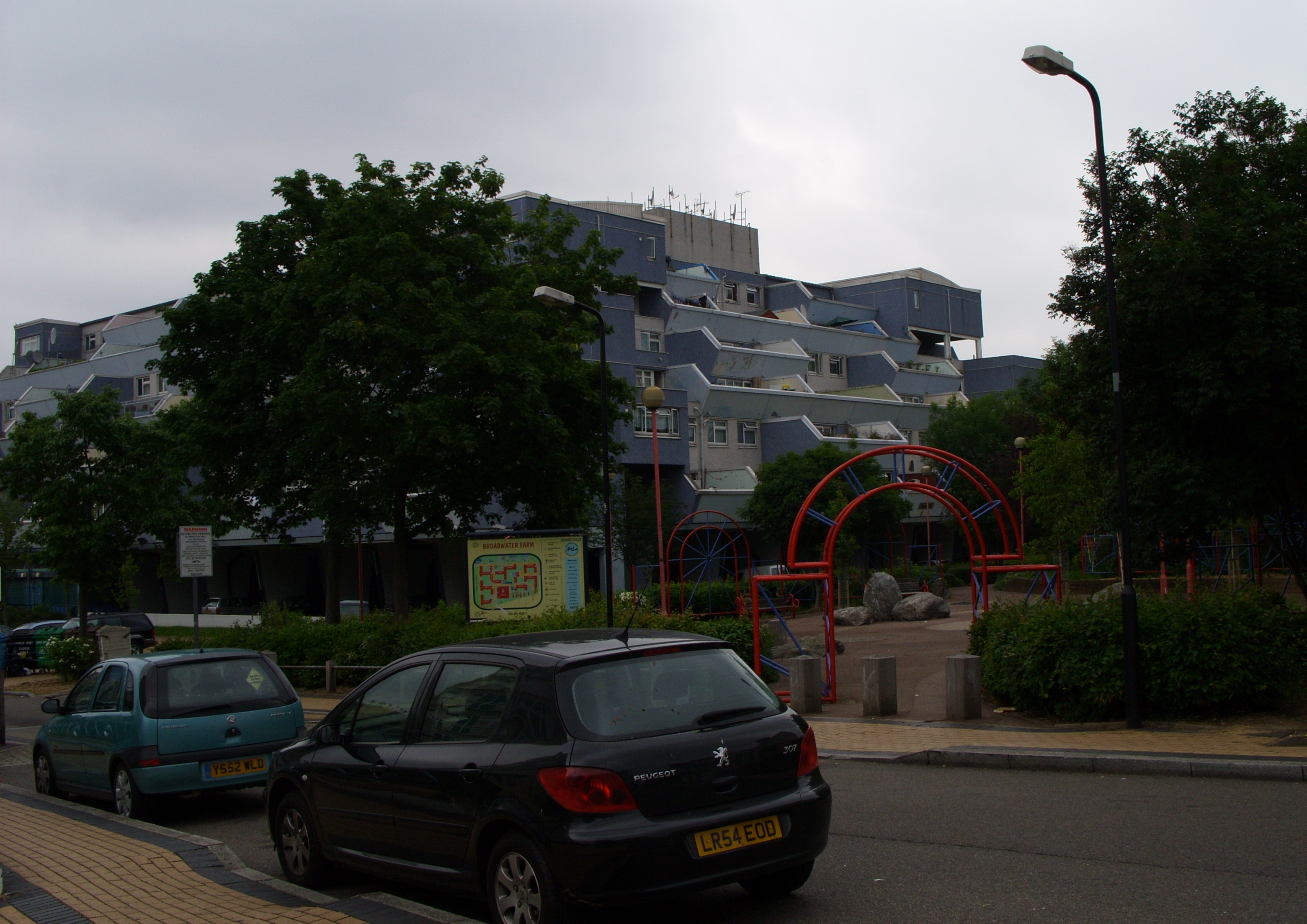
The Tangmere ziggurat block

Although the demographics of Broadwater Farm at the time were roughly 50% black and 50% white, the Tenants' Association was all white. It was regarded with increasing distrust by black residents and those whites who were not connected with the Association. In 1981, residents set up the rival "Youth Association". It was praised by many members of the local black community for challenging the Special Patrol Group's perceived harassment of local youths and of black residents of the estate. In 1983, the council gave the Tenants' Association an empty shop to use as an office and a vague authority to "deal with local problems". This apparent favouritism heightened antagonism between the Tenants' Association and Youth Association, which in turn set up its own youth club, advice centre, estate watchdog and local lobbying group.

==== Early regeneration projects ====
Despite a lack of funds and willingness on the part of the council to commit to regeneration, by 1985 progress was made in solving the area's problems. Pressure from the Tenants' Association and the Youth Association forced the council to open a Neighbourhood Office. In 1983, a tenants' empowerment agency, Priority Estates Project, was appointed to coordinate residents' complaints and concerns. Residents were included on interview panels for council staff dealing with the estate.

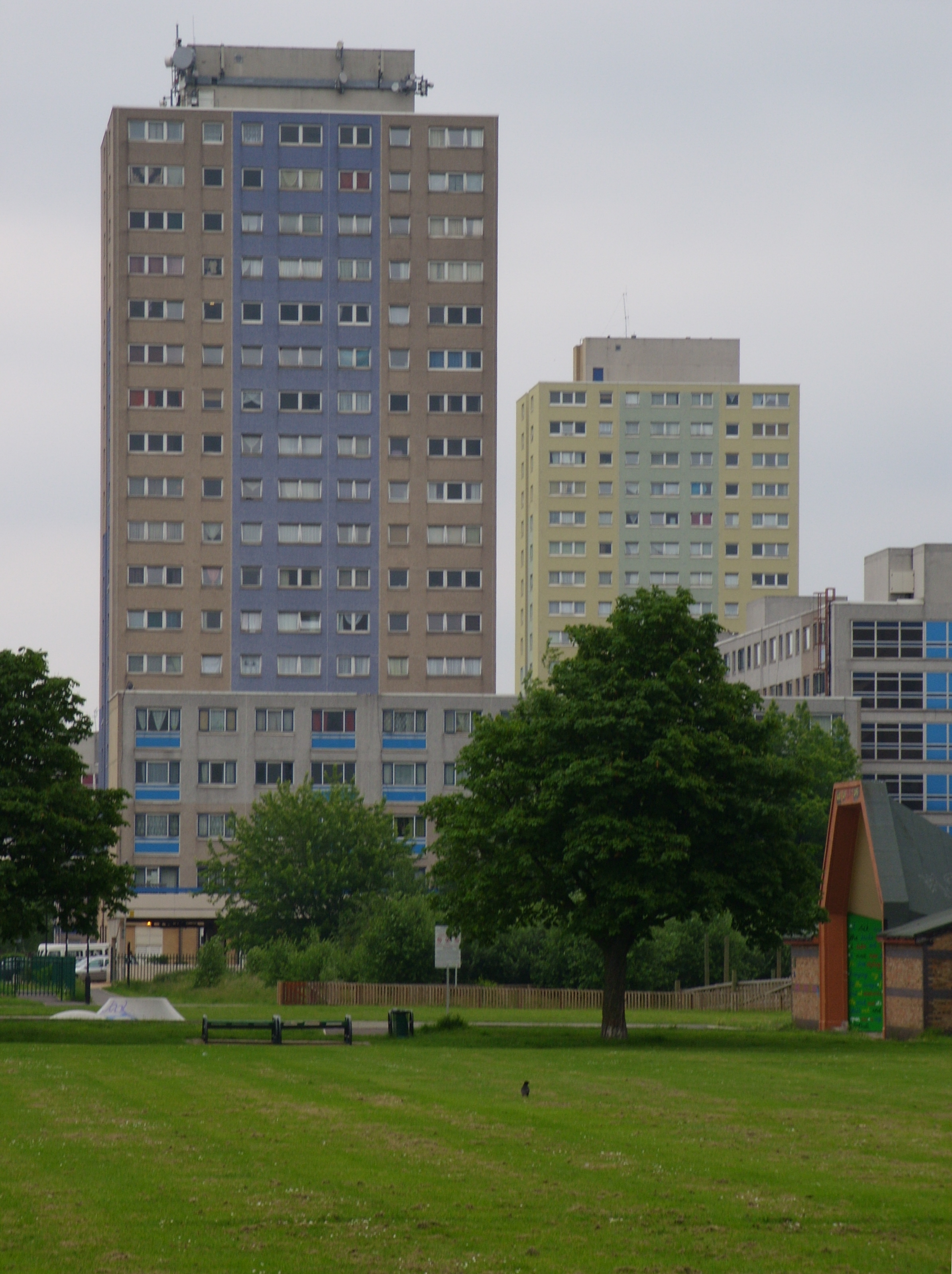
Kenley and Northolt towers and Hornchurch block.

A number of initiatives aimed at providing activities for disaffected local youths and at integrating the mixture of ethnic communities in the area appeared to be succeeding; Sir George Young, then Minister for Inner Cities, secured significant funding for improvements. Broadwater Farm began to be seen as a case study in regenerating a failed housing development. Princess Diana paid a visit to the estate in February 1985, to commend the improvements being made, but much of the apparent progress was superficial. The problems caused by the deck-level walkways had not been solved; children from Broadwater Farm were still under-achieving academically in comparison to the surrounding areas; the unemployment rate stood at 42%; and there was a mutual distrust between the local residents—particularly those from the Afro-Caribbean community—and the predominantly White British and non-local police force.

=== Broadwater Farm riot ===
There had been earlier riots in Brixton and in Handsworth in Birmingham, which were indicative of a period of rising racial tension, during which some police methods such as raids, saturation policing and stop and search tactics increased the frustration of some members of the black community.

Floyd Jarrett, whose home was about one mile (1.5 kilometres) from the Farm, was arrested by police on 5 October 1985, having given false details when stopped in a car with an allegedly false tax disc. While he was in custody, four officers attended his home to conduct a search. During the search, his mother Cynthia Jarrett collapsed and died. It has never been satisfactorily concluded how and why Cynthia Jarrett died, and whether it was a heart attack or due to police actions.

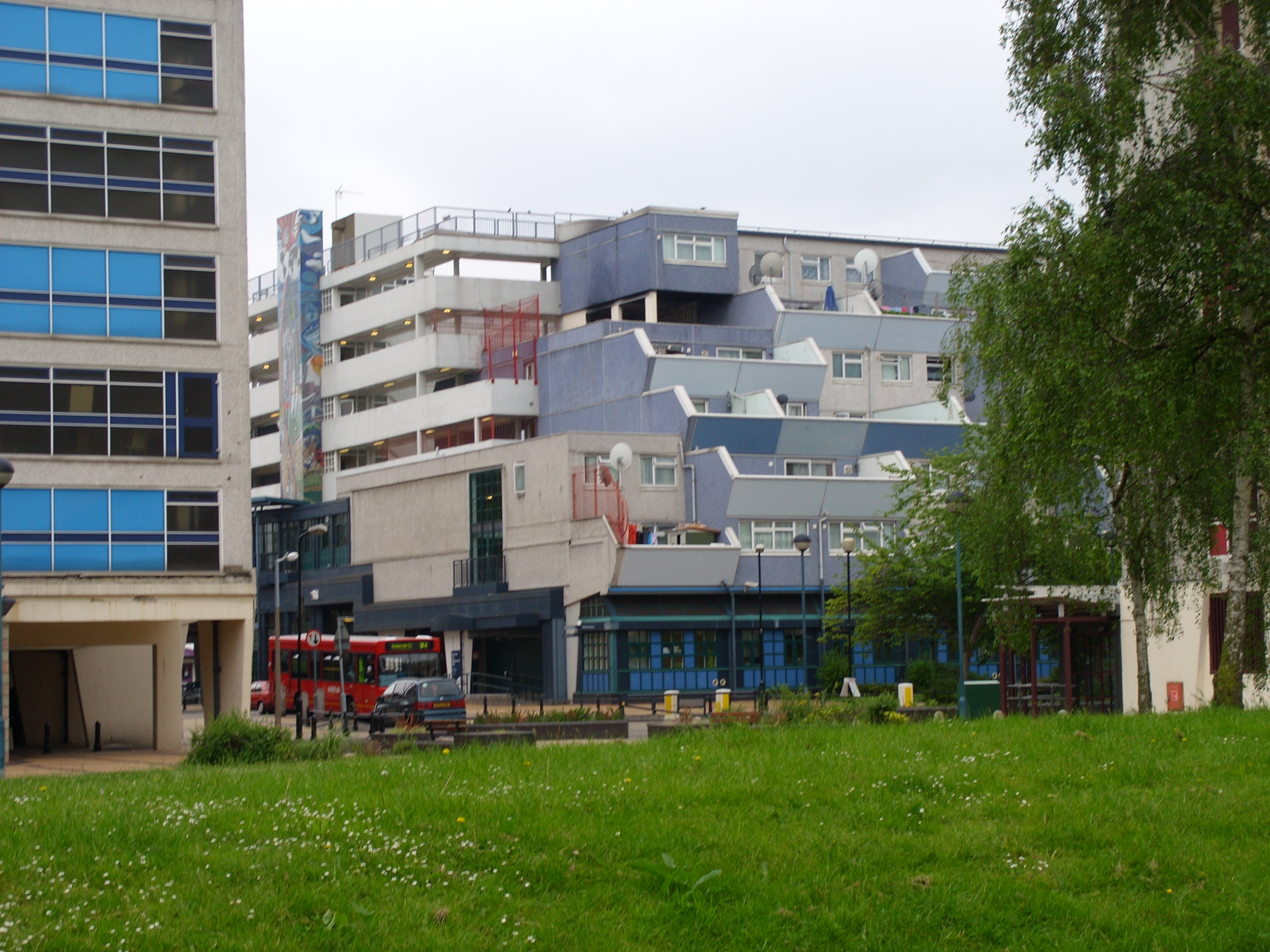
Tangmere block, with its distinctive ziggurat structure. The holes in the wall at first floor level left by the demolition of the deck-level walkways are clearly visible.

The next day, 6 October 1985, saw a small demonstration outside Tottenham police station, which initially passed off relatively peacefully other than a bottle being thrown through one of the station's windows. At 3.15 pm two officers were attacked and seriously injured by the crowd, suffering gunshot wounds. Three journalists were also treated for gunshot wounds.

==== Murder of PC Keith Blakelock ====
At 6.45 pm a police van answering a 999 call to Broadwater Farm was surrounded and attacked. As further police officers made their way to the area, rioters erected barricades on the deck level and the emergency services withdrew from the deck level. At 9.30 pm fire broke out in a newsagent's shop on the deck level of the Tangmere block. Firefighters attempting to put out the fire came under attack, and police attended to assist them. As the situation escalated, police and firefighters withdrew. In the withdrawal, PCs Keith Blakelock and Richard Coombes became separated from other officers. A group of around 40 people attacked them with sticks, knives and machetes, leading to PC Blakelock's death and serious injuries to PC Coombes. As news of the death spread, the rioting subsided. Local council leader Bernie Grant claims to have been misquoted as saying that "What the police got was a bloody good hiding".

Three local residents, Mark Braithwaite, Engin Raghip and Winston Silcott, were convicted of PC Blakelock's murder. However, three years later their convictions were overturned when it was discovered that police notes of their interviews had been tampered with. The person or persons guilty of the murder have never been identified but in 2010, a man was arrested on suspicion of murdering PC Blakelock.

=== Reconstruction ===
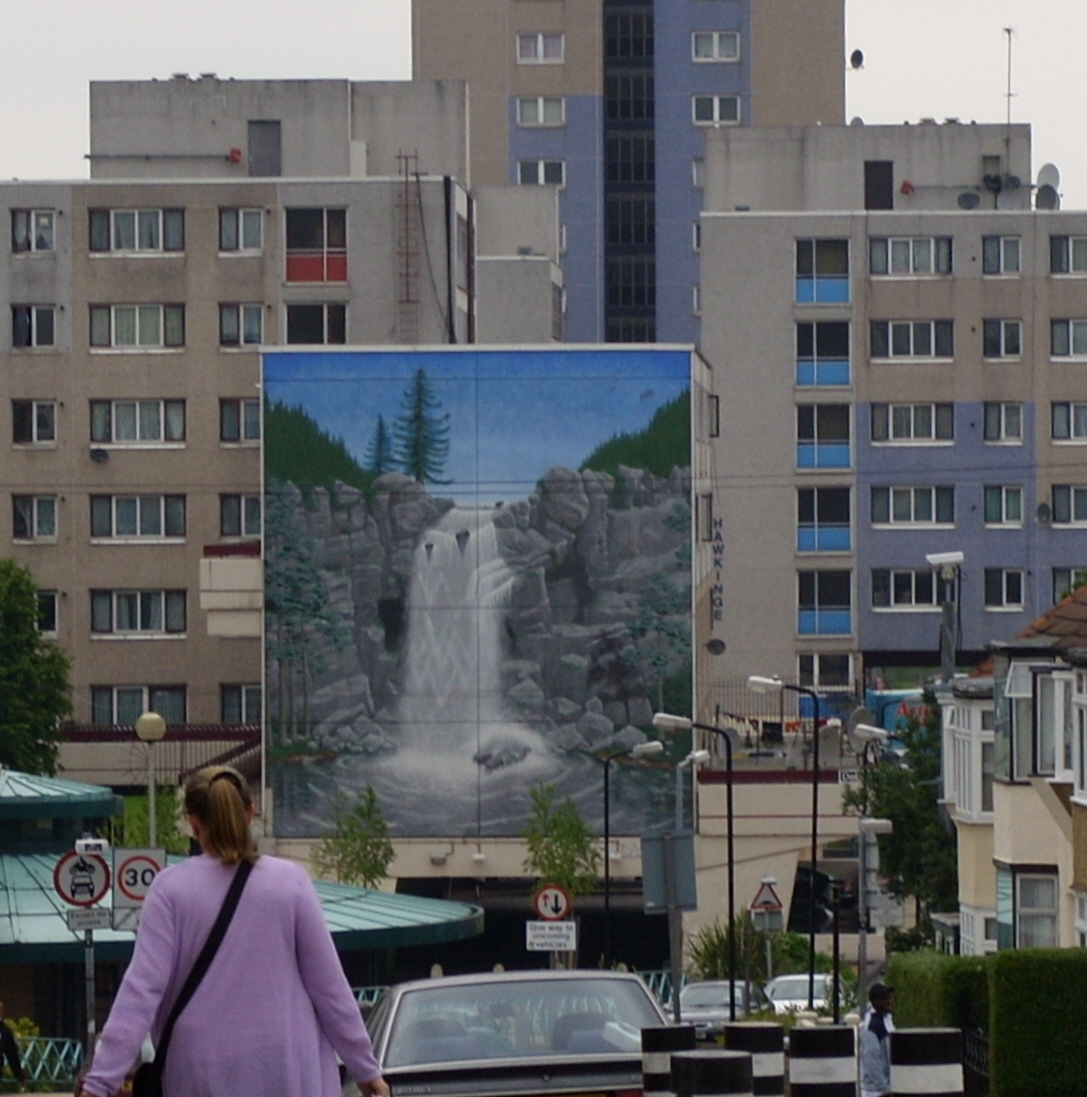
"Waterfall" mural

After the events of 1985, Broadwater Farm became the focus of an intensive £33 million regeneration programme in response to the problems highlighted by the riots. The all-white Tenants Association was restructured to more accurately reflect the community, and residents' concerns seriously addressed by the authorities. A local management team was brought in to oversee improvements to the estate and to collect rents and enforce regulations, instead of continuing to attempt to run the estate centrally from Haringey Council's central offices. The deck level was dismantled and the overhead walkways demolished, with the shops and amenities relocated to a single ground-level strip of road to transform the semi-derelict Willan Road into a "High Street" for the area. The surrounding areas were landscaped and each building redesigned to give it a unique identity.

A network of council-run CCTV cameras was installed to monitor the streets and car parks, and each building staffed by a concierge to deter unwanted visitors. Two giant murals were painted which now dominate the area, one of a waterfall on the side of Debden block and one depicting Mahatma Gandhi, Martin Luther King Jr., John Lennon and Bob Marley on Rochford block. Disused shops left empty following the withdrawal of businesses after the riots were converted into low-cost light industrial units to provide employment opportunities for residents and prevent capital from flowing out of the area. Since the redevelopment, the flow of people leaving the estate has slowed to a trickle, and there is now a lengthy waiting list for housing.

== Demolition proposed ==
Following tests conducted in the wake of the 2017 Grenfell Tower disaster, Haringey Council announced on 20 June 2018 the evacuation of two of the blocks. Eleven of the blocks were structurally unsafe and vulnerable to collapse if a gas pipe or gas canister were to explode or if vehicle were to strike the base of the buildings. Tangmere House, a six-storey block, and Northholt, an 18-storey block, are those worst affected, and would be demolished. The blocks were built using the same large-panel system used on Ronan Point, where a gas explosion in 1968 caused progressive collapse, killing four people.

=== Safety worries ===
Broadwater Farm was built using the same Taylor Woodrow-Anglian system of panels as Ronan Point. The domino-like system of large structural slabs speeded the building and allowed cheaper, less expert labour to be used to assemble the prefabricated panels. Even so, construction standards were ignored; mortar joints stuffed with newspaper reduced drying time and weakened the buildings. The blocks were inspected for safety in 1985 about the same time that gas was installed. Gaps, wide enough to see the flat below, were found between the external wall panels and the edge of the floor slabs. The gaps opened and closed depending on temperature. Fire could push them out of alignment and would cause the collapse of the building.

== Crime rates ==
After the regeneration, crime in and around Broadwater initially improved. In the first quarter of 2005, there were not any reported robberies or outdoor assaults on Broadwater Farm, and only a single burglary, from which all property was recovered and the suspect arrested; this compares with 875 burglaries, 50 robberies and 50 assaults in the third quarter of 1985, immediately preceding the riot. In an independent 2003 survey of all the estate's residents, only 2% said they considered the area unsafe, the lowest figure for any area in London. In 2005 the Metropolitan Police disbanded the Broadwater Farm Unit altogether as it was no longer required in an area with such a low crime rate.

However, crime rates have since increased.

OFB (The Original Farm Boys) is the current gang associated with the Broadwater Farm Estate.

However, as of November 2021 at least one person on the estate still identified as part of the Farm Mandem gang. The Farm Mandem gang, otherwise known as the Tottenham Mandem, was operational at the time of the Broadwater Farm riot, and one of its early members, Mark Lambie, was a suspect in the murder of PC Keith Blakelock.

Mark Lambie rose to become leader of the gang, and was jailed for 12 years in 2002 for luring two men to the Broadwater Farm estate where he captured them at gunpoint and then imprisoned them and tortured them with a hammer, a hot iron and boiling water.

There have been numerous more recent stabbings in and around the estate, including:

- On 30 August 2019, the murder of 15-year-old Perry Jordan Brammer on the estate. Romario Lindo stabbed him 10 times for intervening to attempt to prevent the theft of a £90 pair of trainers from a 14 year old

- On 23 July 2020, two 15-year-old boys and a 19 year old man shot on the estate, believed to be gang related

- On 1 August 2021, the murder of 16-year-old Stelios Averkiou in Lordship Recreation Ground

- On 14 June 2022, a 17-year-old boy travelling on a bus on Higham Road was found to have been stabbed. Officers responded with London's Air Ambulance and the boy survived

The Met Violence Suppression Unit, formed in 2020 to target violence and gang-related crime, is active in Broadwater Farm.

At the time of writing (October 2022), the most recent month where crime data is provided is July 2022 during which 44 crimes were reported in Broadwater Farm, including 11 violent and sexual offences.

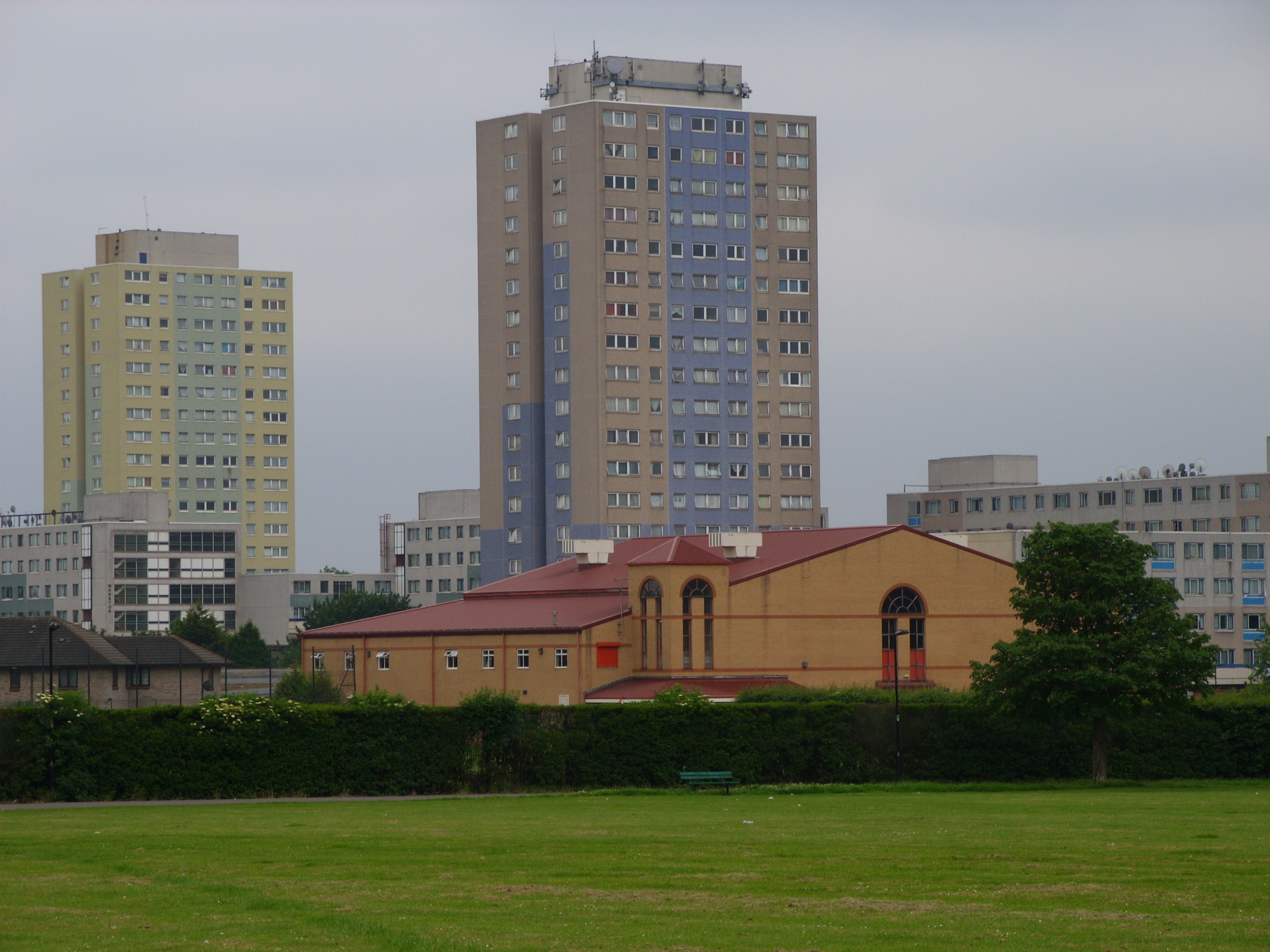
Kenley and Northolt Towers, resurfaced with distinctive colours as part of the regeneration programme, as seen from Lordship Recreation Ground. The Broadwater Farm Community Centre is in the foreground.

== Places of interest ==
Bruce Castle, once the home of Rowland Hill, inventor of the postage stamp, is on the north side of Lordship Lane immediately opposite Broadwater Farm. It was built by William Compton in the 16th century, and has been a public museum since 1906. It houses the public archives of Haringey Council, as well as a large display on the history of the postal system.

Broadwater Farm is home to the Broadwater United football coaching programme. Set up in the aftermath of the events of 1985 with the intention of providing a focus for local youths, it has subsequently produced a number of professional footballers, including Jobi McAnuff, Lionel Morgan and Jude Stirling, son of the programme manager Clasford Stirling.

== Facilities ==
=== Schools ===
In 2007 a new Children's Centre opened on the estate, with nursery places for 104 children. It is considered one of the best designed nursery schools in the world, and won the Royal Institute of British Architects's Award for 2007.

Broadwater Farm contains Broadwater Inclusive Learning Community, which comprises The Willow (a two-form entry primary school), The Brook (120 space special school), Broadwaters' Children Centre (school nursery, childcare for under 5s and a vast range of community services) and Broadwaters' Extended School Service (breakfast, after school and holiday provision). Secondary education is provided by nearby Woodside High School, formerly named White Hart Lane School, approximately 200m outside the Broadwater Farm area.

=== Shops ===
Following the riots, many shops in Broadwater Farm withdrew from the area, and those that remained closed following the demolition of the deck level. Broadwater Farm is consequently extremely poorly served by shops. Haringey Council has provided 21 small "enterprise units" at a deliberately low cost to entice firms to open in the area, but these have proved hard to fill. However, Broadwater Farm is only 400m from the shops and supermarkets of Tottenham High Road, and approximately 2 km from the Shopping City supermall at Wood Green.

=== Transport ===
Due to the waterlogged ground and lack of population prior to the containment of the Moselle, Broadwater Farm was bypassed by the Underground. Bruce Grove railway station, 400m east of the estate, connects the area to central London. Because of the narrow streets, double-decker and bendy buses are unable to serve the area. From 11 February 2006 the W4 route, which utilises Alexander Dennis Enviro200 Dart to navigate the narrow streets and sharp bends, was diverted to run into the estate, providing direct public transport links for the first time. A number of other bus routes run along Lordship Lane, immediately to the north and Philip Lane to the south. Turnpike Lane Underground station is within walking distance to the south west.

== Demographics ==
There are currently between 3,800 and 4,000 residents of Broadwater Farm. Following the events of 1985 a number of local residents left and were replaced mainly by recent immigrants particularly Kurds, Somalis and Congolese, but still maintains its large Afro-Caribbean heritage. In 2005, approximately 70% of residents were from an ethnic minority background and 39 different languages were spoken on the estate. In 2011, 13.4% of residents were White British, 11.9% were Asian and 36.1% were Black.

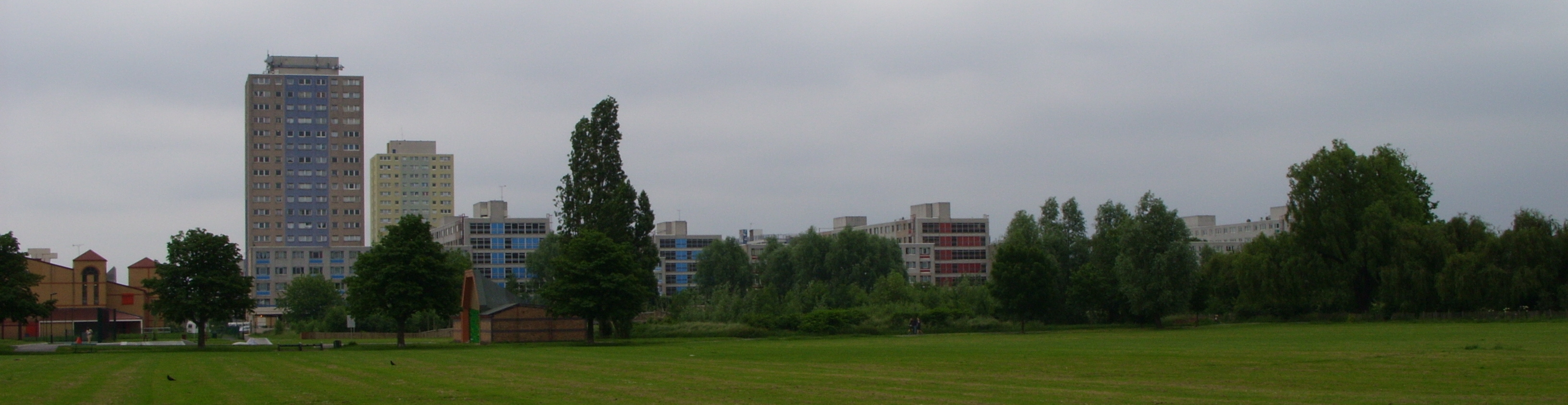
The Broadwater Farm Estate following regeneration, as seen from Lordship Recreation Ground. Each building has a distinct colour scheme.

== Notable residents ==
- Shocka, rapper and mental health advocate
- Tice Cin, writer and artist
- Headie One, rapper
- Bandokay, rapper
- Double Lz, rapper

== See also ==
- List of large council estates in the UK
- Cabrini–Green
- Pruitt-Igoe
- Red Road Flats
- Ballymun Flats
