= Rv (rapper) =

British rapper (born 1993)

- Born: Jordan Craig Townsend; 8 December 1993 (age 32); Tottenham, London, England
- Genres: British hip-hop; UK drill
- Occupations: Rapper; songwriter
- Years active: 2010–present
- Label: Starish Entertainment
- Member of: OFB

Jordan Craig Townsend (born 8 December 1993), known professionally as Rv (formerly Young RV), is an English rapper and songwriter whose mixtape Drillers and Trappers 2 with rapper Headie One reached number 21 on the UK Albums Chart.

== Early life ==
Townsend grew up in Tottenham in North London and attended Finchley Catholic High School. Both of his parents are Jamaican. He was originally a member of Star Gang, an offshoot of the Tottenham Mandem gang. Rv has stated he converted to Islam after his cousin Fatman, who was Muslim, died in 2007. Rv got his moniker from a friend that died in 2010. His friend went by the name Revenge 24 and had told Rv that if he died or went to jail, Rv had to "carry on the name".

== Career ==
In 2010, he released his first mixtape Cruddy on the Streets, followed in 2011 by AntiSocial Behaviour, a joint mixtape with Supa Capone, and Call of Duty: Tottenham Warfare, a compilation mixtape featuring various Tottenham artists.

He and rapper Headie One became frequent collaborators, including co-releasing the mixtapes Sticks & Stones (2016) and Drillers x Trappers (2017). Together they formed part of OFB, a UK drill group based in the Broadwater Farm estate. While in prison, he and other OFB members had released music videos where they warn their rivals that they will grab and stab them.

Rv also released a solo EP, Fresh Prince of Tottenham, on 24 August 2018.

Following his release from prison, on 22 March 2019, Rv and Headie One released a third mixtape called Drillers x Trappers II. It entered the UK Albums Chart at number 21. "Match Day", the first single from the mixtape, entered the Singles Chart at number 86. He publicly revealed his face for the first time in the music video "Why Always Me".

On 1 July 2019, he did a freestyle rap on Charlie Sloth's show. On 2 August 2019, he released the solo EP, Savage. On 14 April 2021, he did a Plugged In with Fumez the Engineer, a UK rap freestyle series.

== Legal issues ==
In 2012, he and other North London gang members were convicted of wounding with intent to do grievous bodily harm and possession of an offensive weapon in a stabbing of a 15-year-old boy at a barber shop in Wood Green. He received a seven-year sentence.

== Discography ==
=== Mixtapes ===
- Cruddy on the Streets (2010)
- AntiSocial Behaviour (2011) (with Supa Capone)
- Call of Duty: Tottenham Warfare (2011)
- Sticks & Stones (2016) (with Headie One)
- Drillers x Trappers (2017) (with Headie One)
- Drillers x Trappers II (2019) (with Headie One)
- Rico Vondelle (2021)
- Inconspicuous (2023)

=== EP ===
- Fresh Prince of Tottenham (2018)
- Savage (2019)
