= OFB (rap group) =

British hip hop collective

- Origin: Broadwater Farm, London, England
- Genres: British hip hop; UK drill
- Years active: 2016–present
- Label: Rattrap Reality
- Members: See list

OFB, Short for Original Farm Boys, is an English hip hop collective based in Broadwater Farm, North London. OFB is one of the most prominent UK drill groups.

== History ==
Headie One (formerly Headz) and RV (formerly Young RV) are among the most prominent members of the group. They were both originally rappers in Star Gang, a road rap group from the 2000s and an offshoot group from the Tottenham Mandem gang. RV and Headie One have frequently collaborated with each other, including co-releasing the mixtapes Sticks & Stones (2016) and Drillers x Trappers (2017). In February 2018, Headie One released his solo mixtape, The One. The mixtape included the song "Know Better" featuring RV, which became an "underground hit". This was followed by another solo mixtape, The One Two, in June 2018, which entered the UK Albums Chart at number 32.

Bandokay, Double Lz and SJ are the younger members within OFB, Initially signifying their status using the name Y.OFB (Young OFB), Before later dropping the "Y." and co-opting the "OFB" prefix older members of the group used. Bandokay, Whose real name is Kemani Duggan, Is the son of Mark Duggan, the man whose death by police shooting led to the 2011 England riots. Bandokay credited music for keeping him away from crime, and stated his desire to be away from police as a motivator:

"Whenever [the police] see me, They stop me, I get what they're trying to do – they're trying to take weapons. But I know they purposely stop me more than anyone else. They know who I am. They know who my dad is. So that's why I'm trying to go through music and do something positive, so they don't have nothing to say about me."

Bandokay credited fellow OFB rapper Headie One as a major influence, As well as UK drill group 67 and American rapper Lil Durk. Double Lz noted Giggs, American rapper Quando Rondo, and the Chicago drill scene in general as influences.

In January 2019, Headie One released "18Hunna", Featuring Dave, Which entered the UK chart at number 6 - the highest a drill artist, at the time, had ever charted, and has gained over 15 million views on YouTube, as of February 2022. Following RV's release from prison, on 22 March 2019, RV and Headie One released a third mixtape called Drillers x Trappers II. It entered the UK Albums Chart at number 21. "Match Day", the first single from the mixtape, entered the Singles Chart at number 86.

In 2019, the OFB released their first collective mixtape titled Frontstreet, named after a road in Broadwater Farm that locals call "Front Street". Dazed Digital called the mixtape "one of the best British debuts of the decade". In 2019, following the release of SJ's "Youngest In Charge", which has gained over 27 million views on YouTube as of February 2022, it was revealed SJ had been arrested was currently facing trial for a murder charge; while waiting for his trial, SJ was offered a £150k deal with an unknown record label. SJ was later convicted and sentenced to life with a minimum of 21 years. His sentence would later be reduced to a minimum of 19 years in 2021, which was announced via his Instagram account. Like many other drill groups, OFB has had its songs taken down by YouTube at the request of the Metropolitan Police. In 2019, OFB's own YouTube channel was also taken down, before later being reinstated the next day. Bandokay stated they were trying to clean up their music in order to avoid takedowns.

== Current members ==
The list below includes confirmed members of OFB

- Abra Cadabra (Aaron Philips)
- Akz
- Bandokay (Kemani Duggan)
- Blitty
- Boogie B (Demario Williams)
- Bradz
- Dee One (formerly D1)
- Delsa
- Dezzie
- Dsavv
- DZ (Darren Kwarteng)
- Headie One (Irving Ampofo Adjei; formerly Headz)
- Izzpot (Isaih Bassey)
- Kash One7 (or simply Kash)
- Kush
- Kofi “17” Jenkins (Kof17enkins)
- Lowkey OFB
- Munie
- Rv (Jordan Townsend; formerly Young RV)
- SJ (Jayden O'Neill-Crichlow)
- Skat
- YF (Colin Emenik)
- ZeZe
- Zilla

== Former members ==
- JS
- Double Lz (Andre Deer)

== Legal issues ==
In February 2019, Boogie B, real name Demario Williams, was jailed for life with minimum term of 20 years for the murder of Dotty, real name Lewis Blackman, which occurred in February 2018. Lawrence Nkunku-Linongi, who had a previous conviction for carrying a knife, and Paul Glasgow, were handed minimum terms of 18 years for the same crime. Thierry Edusei, who had been on bail on suspicion of violent offences at the time, was handed 11 years for manslaughter. Demario's case is frequently mentioned in the lyrics of OFB rappers.

In 2020, SJ, whose real name is Jayden O'Neill-Crichlow, alongside four others (Sheareem Cookhorn, Tyrell "Trills" Graham, Shane "Sneakz" Lyons and Ojay "O'Sav" Hamilton), was given a life sentence with a minimum of 21 years for the murder of 19-year-old Kamali Gabbidon-Lynck in Wood Green. The convicted group was reportedly linked to Tottenham gang NPK. Fights broke out in the dock and the public gallery in reaction to the sentencing. Carl Stanbury, the partner of Lyons' mother, later received seven months in jail for jumping from the public gallery in protest. SJ's sentence was later reduced to a minimum of 19 years in 2021, which was announced via his Instagram account. Before his sentence, he received a reprimand for the possession of a bladed article at age 14.

In 2022, Bandokay and Double Lz were charged with violent disorder following a 2021 incident at a Selfridges store, in which two people were stabbed.

In 2024, Bandokay was arrested at Gatwick Airport over firearms offences. On 15th of January he appeared at Thames Magistrates' Court and was charged with possession of a handgun and ammunition without a licence. On 3 July he pleaded guilty for possession of firearm with intent to cause fear of violence. Two days later, Bandokay, real name Kemani Duggan, was given a five years jail sentence.

== Discography ==
=== Mixtapes ===
List of mixtapes, with selected details and peak chart positions
Title	Details	Peak chart positions	Certifications
Title	Details	UK	Certifications
Frontstreet (with SJ, Bandokay and Double Lz)	Released: 31 October 2019; Label: Rattrap Reality; Format: Digital download, streaming	36	BPI: Silver
Drill Commandments (with Bandokay and Double Lz)	Released: 19 March 2021; Label: Rattrap Reality; Format: Digital download, streaming	53	

=== Singles ===
==== As lead artist ====
List of singles, with selected peak chart positions
Title	Year	Peak chart positions	Certifications	Album
Title	Year	UK	Certifications	Album
"Ambush" (featuring Double Lz, Bandokay and SJ)	2019	—	BPI: Gold	Frontstreet
"Youngest In Charge"	2019	—	BPI: Silver	Frontstreet
"OT Boppin" (with Bandokay and Double Lz)	2020	91		Non-album singles
"BLM" (with Bandokay and Double Lz featuring Abra Cadabra)	2020	63		Non-album singles
"Daily Duppy" (featuring GRM Daily)	2021	—		Non-album singles
"Hashtag" (with BandoKay and Double Lz)	2021	—		Non-album singles
"—" denotes a recording that did not chart or was not released in that territory.

==== As featured artist ====
List of singles, with selected peak chart positions
Title	Year	Peak chart positions	Certifications	Album
Title	Year	UK	Certifications	Album
"Skrr" (Yxng Bane featuring OFB)	2019	74		Non-single album
"Magic" (Ill Blu featuring OFB, BandoKay and Double Lz)	2020	46	BPI: Silver	The BLUPRINT
"Circles" (Deno featuring OFB, BandoKay and Double Lz)	2021	36		Boy Meets World

== Awards and nominations ==
Year	Award	Nominated work	Category	Result	Ref.
2020	GRM Daily Rated Awards	Frontstreet	Mixtape of the Year	Nominated	
