= Abra Cadabra =

British rapper (born 1997)

- Born: Aaron Philips; 3 May 1997 (age 29); Tottenham, London, England
- Genres: British hip hop; UK drill; afroswing
- Occupations: Rapper; singer; songwriter
- Years active: 2015–present
- Label: Capitol
- Member of: OFB

Aaron Philips (born 3 May 1997), known professionally as Abra Cadabra, is an English rapper and singer. He is a member of the UK drill group OFB.

Abra Cadabra debuted his first track, "Man Down", in September 2015. He then went on to star in a platform called "BlackBox" in March 2016, and released a freestyle called "Robbery", which was later premiered as a single in July 2016. He is most known for his single "On Deck", which was released in July 2020.

== Career ==
Abra Cadabra was born in London. He started his music career at the age of 18, releasing his first song, "Man Down", in 2015.

In July 2020, he released "On Deck". It peaked at number 32 on the UK singles chart.

== Discography ==
=== EPs ===
Title	Details
Feature Boy EP	Released: 15 April 2018; Label: Abra Cadabra; Format: Digital download
Love Or Lust?	Released: 13 February 2020; Label: No Problem Records; Format: Digital download
Mixed Emotions EP	Released: 13 February 2021; Label: No Problem Records; Format: Digital download
Mixed Emotions II EP	Released: 14 February 2023; Label: Abra Cadabra; Format: Digital download

=== Mixtapes ===
Title	Details	Certifications
Product of My Environment	Released: 4 December 2020; Label: Abra Cadabra; Format: Digital download	BPI: Silver

=== Singles ===
==== As lead artist ====
Title	Year	Peak chart positions	Certifications	Album
Title	Year	UK	Certifications	Album
"Robbery"	2016	–	BPI: Silver	Non-album single
"On Deck"	2020	32	BPI: Silver	Product of My Environment
"Spin This Coupe"	2020	49		Product of My Environment
"Flicky"	2020	–		Product of My Environment
"Fire in the Booth"	2020	–		Non-album single
"Trenches"	2020	–		Product of My Environment
"How We Living"	2020	–		Product of My Environment
"Baby"	2020	–		Non-album singles
"Mixed Emotions"	2021	45	BPI: Silver	Non-album singles
"U Know" (featuring Kush)	2021	–		Non-album singles
"Somebody's Son"	2021	–		Non-album singles
"Daily Duppy"	2021	–		Non-album singles
"Double Tap" (with Unknown T)	2021	64		Non-album singles
"Lean Wit It"	2021			Non-album singles
"Can't Be Us" (with Headie One and Bandokay)	2022	27		Non-album singles
"Local" (with Headie One and Bandokay)	2022	64		Non-album singles

==== As featured artist ====
Title	Year	Peak chart positions	Certifications	Album
Title	Year	UK	Certifications	Album
"Dun Talkin'" (Kojo Funds featuring Abra Cadabra)	2016	–	BPI: Silver	Non-album singles
"Dumb Flex" (Miss LaFamilia featuring Abra Cadabra)	2021	–		Non-album singles
"The Convo 5" (RA featuring Abra Cadabra, M24, Ard Adz, Backroad Gee, STINX and Shanny4rmdaBrixx)	2021	–		Non-album singles
"The Convo 6" (RA featuring STINX, Shanny4rmdaBrixx, Megz, Den Den, Ard Adz, Backroad Gee, Abra Cadabra & M24)	2021	–		Non-album singles
"Movie" (with OneFour)	2025	—		Look at Me Now

== Awards and nominations ==
Year	Award	Nominated work	Category	Result	Ref.
2021	GRM Daily Rated Awards	Himself	Male Artist of the Year	Nominated	
2021	GRM Daily Rated Awards	"On Deck"	Track of the Year	Nominated	
2021	GRM Daily Rated Awards	Product of My Environment	Mixtape of the Year	Nominated	
