= Double Lz =

British rapper (born 2002)

- Born: Andre Deer; 16 December 2002 (age 23)
- Origin: Tottenham, London
- Genre: British hip hop
- Occupations: Rapper; songwriter
- Years active: 2018–present
- Formerly of: OFB

Andre Deer (born 16 December 2002), known professionally as Double Lz (formerly stylized as DoubleLz), is an English rapper and songwriter. He is a former member of the UK drill group OFB. Debuting in 2018, he released two mixtapes - Frontstreet and Drill Commandments - alongside Bandokay and SJ in 2019 and 2021, respectively. He released his debut solo mixtape, Two Lz Make a Win, in 2022.

== Career ==
Double Lz released his debut solo single, "Spillings", in May 2018. In 2019, Double Lz, alongside Bandokay and SJ, released Frontstreet, which peaked at number 36 on the UK albums chart and 97th in Ireland. This was followed up by Drill Commandments - released in March 2021 - which peaked at number 53 in the UK.

== Personal life ==
Deer is the son of Kevin Hutchinson-Foster, a drug dealer who was jailed for 11 years in 2013 for providing a gun to Mark Duggan prior to his death. He has one daughter.

== Legal issues ==
In 2022, Double Lz, alongside Bandokay, was charged with violent disorder following a 2021 incident at a Selfridges store, in which two people were stabbed. In 2023, he was found guilty but his sentence was suspended.

== Discography ==
=== Mixtapes ===
List of albums, with selected details
Title	Details	Peak chart positions		Certifications
Title	Details	UK	IRE	Certifications
Frontstreet (with OFB, SJ and Bandokay)	Released: 14 November 2019; Label: Rattrap Reality; Format: Online download	36	97	BPI: Silver
Drill Commandments (with OFB and Bandokay)	Released: 19 March 2021; Label: Rattrap Reality; Format: Online download	53	—	
Two Lz Make A Win	Released: 9 December 2022; Format: Online download	—	—	

=== Singles ===
==== As main artist ====
Title	Year	Peak chart positions	Certifications	Album
Title	Year	UK	Certifications	Album
"Spillings"	2018	—		Non-album singles
"Bad B on the Nizz" (with Bandokay and SJ)	2018	—		Non-album singles
"Reality" (with Bandokay and SJ)	2018	—		Non-album singles
"Purge" (with Bandokay and SJ)	2019	—		Non-album singles
"Spillings 2.0"	2019	—		Non-album singles
"Next Up?" (with Bandokay and SJ)	2019	—		Non-album singles
"Hardest Bars Freestyle" (with Bandokay and SJ)	2019	—		Non-album singles
"Ambush" (with Bandokay and SJ)	2019	—	BPI: Silver	Frontstreet
"Mad About Bars" (with Kenny Allstar & Bandokay)	2019	—		Non-album singles
"Hooked"	2019	—		Non-album singles
"Lightwork Freestyle" (with Bandokay)	2020	—		Non-album singles
"OT Bopping" (with Bandokay)	2020	91		Non-album singles
"Let Man Know" (with Bandokay and Abra Cadabra)	2020	—		Non-album singles
"Sliding" (with Dsavv)	2020	—		Non-album singles
"Straight Outta Tottenham"	2020	—		Non-album singles
"BLM" (with Bandokay and Abra Cadabra)	2020	63		Non-album singles
"What's Goodie" (with Bandokay)	2020	—		Non-album singles
"Ahlie" (with Bandokay and Izzpot)	2021	—		Non-album singles
"YKTV" (with Bandokay and Izzpot)	2021	—		Non-album singles
"Daily Duppy" (with Bandokay and Izzpot)	2021	—		Non-album singles
"Hashtag" (with Bandokay)	2021	—		Non-album singles
"Flick of the Wrist" (with Bandokay)	2021	—		Drill Commandments
"Dumpa Truck"	2021	—		Non-album singles
"Plugged In" (with Fumez the Engineer)	2021	—		Non-album singles
"Bye Felicia"	2021	—		Non-album singles
"Villa Freestyle"	2021	—		Non-album singles
"Block Freestyle"	2022	—		Non-album singles
"Lively" (featuring Jaykae and Blair Muir)	2022	80		Non-album singles
"Out in the O"	2022	—		Two Lz Make A Win
"The Beginning"	2022	—		Two Lz Make A Win
"Drill & Bass" (featuring Blair Muir)	2022	—		Two Lz Make A Win
"Daily Duppy"	2022	—		Non-album single
"Frontline" (with OFB)	2022	—		Two Lz Make A Win
"Feel Bigger"	2022	—		Two Lz Make A Win

==== As featured artist ====
Title	Year	Peak chart positions	Certifications	Album
Title	Year	UK	Certifications	Album
"Skrr" (Yxng Bane featuring Bandokay and Double Lz)	2019	—		Non-album singles
"No Games" (Kush featuring Double Lz)	2020	—		Non-album singles
"The Coldest Link Up, Pt. 2" (Tweeko and Sebz featuring Double Lz, S Wavey, Tiny Syikes, J.B2, Onefour, Trizzac, PS Hitsquad, Pete & Bas)	2020	—		Non-album singles
"Magic" (iLL BLU featuring Bandokay and Double Lz)	2020	46	BPI: Silver	The BLUPRINT
"Hate On Us" (Frosty featuring Bandokay and Double Lz)	2020	84		Under Surveillance
"Circles" (Deno featuring Bandokay and Double Lz)	2020	36		Boy Meets World
"Money" (Ayo Britain featuring Double Lz)	2020	—		Non-album singles
"Double Up" (Sean1da featuring Bandokay and Double Lz)	2020	—		Non-album singles
"Bak2Bak" (Akz featuring Double Lz)	2021	—		The Come Up 1
"—" denotes a recording that did not chart or was not released in that territory.

=== Guest appearances ===
List of non-single guest appearances, with other performing artists
Title	Year	Other artist(s)
"Shots (Remix)"	2019	Morrisson, Bandokay, Burner, V9, Snap Capone
"On Deck (Remix)"	2020	Abra Cadabra, RV, Bandokay, Lowkey, Dezzie
"Youngest in Charge (Remix)"	2021	SJ, Dezzie, Izzpot, Bandokay

== Awards and nominations ==
Year	Award	Nominated work	Category	Result	Ref.
2020	GRM Daily Rated Awards	Frontstreet	Mixtape of the Year	Nominated	
2020	GRM Daily Rated Awards	Himself and Bandokay	Breakthrough of the Year	Nominated	
