= Headie One =

British rapper (born 1994)

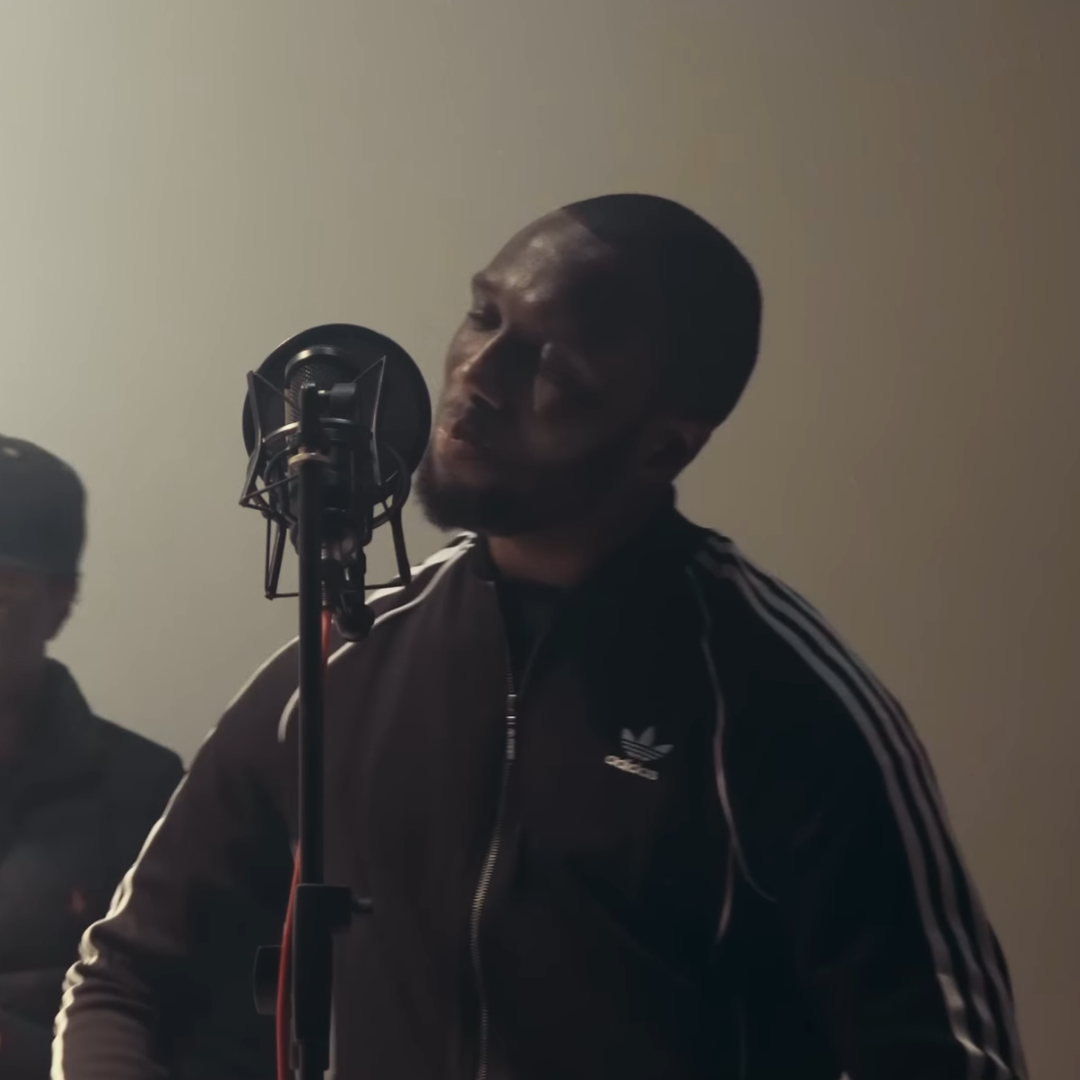

Background information
- Born: Irving Ampofo Adjei; 6 October 1994 (age 32); Tottenham, London, England
- Genres: UK drill; trap; British hip-hop; Afrobeats
- Occupations: Rapper; singer; songwriter
- Years active: 2010–present
- Labels: Relentless; Epic; One
- Member of: OFB
- Formerly of: Star Gang
- Website: headie.one

Irving Ampofo Adjei (born 6 October 1994), known professionally as Headie One (formerly Headz), is an English rapper and singer. In 2018, he released his second solo mixtape, titled The One, which included the single "Know Better" featuring rapper RV, which became an "underground hit".

He is best known for his tracks "18hunna" featuring rapper Dave, "Only You Freestyle" featuring rapper Drake, "Ain't It Different" featuring rappers AJ Tracey and Stormzy and his solo single "Both". The track "18hunna" peaked at number six on the UK Singles Chart, while "Only You Freestyle" peaked at number five on the UK Singles Chart and "Ain't It Different" peaked at number two on the UK Singles Chart.

Headie One has released a series of mixtapes. In 2019, he released his seventh and first mainstream mixtape titled Music x Road, which peaked at number five on the UK Albums Chart. In 2020, he released the critically-acclaimed joint project 'GANG' with Fred Again before releasing his debut album titled Edna—an album that pays homage to his mother, Edna Duah—which peaked at number one on the UK Albums Chart.

== Early life ==
Adjei was born on 6 October 1994 in North Middlesex Hospital, North London. Adjei grew up in the Broadwater Farm housing estate in Tottenham, London. He is of Ghanaian origin and can speak Twi. His mother Edna Duah died when Adjei was three, and he was therefore raised by his father and sister.

In his youth, he was "obsessed" with football and played for local team Haringey Borough F.C. He was due to have a trial with Stevenage F.C. before an ankle fracture led to his exit from the sport.

He first began rapping in his early teens, though only began focusing on it after his first release from prison. His moniker derives from a childhood nickname due to his head's resemblance to a 50p coin.

== Career ==
=== 2010–2019: Career beginnings and mixtapes ===
Adjei began releasing music in the early 2010s under the name Headz, including as part of a group named Star Gang. In 2014, he released his only mixtape under that alias, titled Headz or Tails. Also part of Star Gang was fellow Tottenham rapper RV – he and Headie One became frequent collaborators, including co-releasing the mixtapes Sticks & Stones (2016) and Drillers x Trappers (2017). Together they formed part of OFB, a UK drill group based in the Broadwater Farm estate.

In February 2018, he released his next solo mixtape as Headie One, titled The One. This included "Know Better" with RV, which became an "underground hit".^{[6]} This was his first release that was signed to Relentless Records, a subsidiary of Sony Music.^{[7]} In May, he was featured on "Missing", a Belly Squad track that peaked at number 84 on the UK Singles Chart.^{[8]} This was followed by another solo mixtape, The One Two, in June 2018, which entered the UK Albums Chart at number 32.^{[9]} In November, he performed on his first national UK tour.^{[10]}

In January 2019, his single "18Hunna", featuring Dave, entered the UK chart at number 6 – the highest a drill artist ever charted prior to "Body" by Russ Millions and Tion Wayne.^{[11][12]} In March, Adjei released his sixth mixtape, and third with RV, Drillers x Trappers II.^{[13]} It entered the UK Albums Chart at number 21.^{[14]} "Match Day", the first single from the mixtape, entered the Singles Chart at number 86.^{[11]} In July, he featured on the "I Spy" single by Krept and Konan, which peaked at number 18.^{[15]}

=== 2019–2020: Music x Road ===
In August 2019, Adjei released his seventh mixtape in five years, Music x Road.^{[16]} The release was praised by critics,^{[16][17][18]} and was noted for being a move away from his usual sound – with NME describing it as being "often far from drill".^{[17]} It entered the UK Albums Chart at number 5 – his highest chart placing to date.^{[11]} Other than the previously released "18Hunna", several tracks from the mixtape also charted, such as "Back to Basics" with Skepta, "Rubbery Bandz" and "Both".^{[11]}

In December 2019, he featured on Stormzy's new album Heavy Is the Head on the song "Audacity". In April 2020, Adjei collaborated with Fred Again… to release his mixtape Gang. In July 2020, he released a single featuring Drake called "Only You Freestyle" produced by M1onthebeat which peaked at number 5. In August 2020, his single "Ain’t It Different" with Stormzy & AJ Tracey peaked at number two on the UK Singles Chart - his highest charting single to date. The song was certified platinum by British Phonographic Industry on 21 January 2021.

=== 2020–present: Edna and Too Loyal for My Own Good ===
In October 2020, his debut album Edna topped the UK charts.^{[19]} The album was dedicated to his late mother of the same name. It has garnered plenty of praise within the music world. NME praised the "melancholy, minor-key trap beats requisite of in-vogue modern hip-hop",^{[20]} while The Times described Adjei as the "breakout star of drill".^{[21]}

On 1 October 2021, he released his ninth mixtape, Too Loyal for My Own Good. He later released the single "Came In The Scene" on 5 May 2022. this was followed up by the single "Can't Be Us" with Abra Cadabra and Bandokay on 5 August 2022. Following a number of features with European artists, Adjei released his tenth mixtape No Borders: European Collaboration Project on 11 November 2022, featuring Luciano, Koba LaD, Gazo, and more.

On 8 December 2022 he released the single "50s". Following months of anticipation and previews, he released the single "Martin's Sofa" on 13 January 2023.

On 4 May 2023, he was presented with the Brits Billion Award by the British Phonographic Industry for achieving over 1 billion career streams in the UK.

== Personal life ==
Adjei is an avid supporter of Manchester United.

== Legal issues ==
As a teenager, Adjei had been imprisoned three times, including for dealing crack cocaine and heroin, most recently in 2014.

On 8 January 2020, Adjei was sentenced to six months for possession of a knife and imprisoned for a fourth time. He was released early in April 2020.

== Controversy ==
In January 2018, he was reportedly attacked by rivals at the University of Bedfordshire. A video of the assault was posted on Snapchat and then YouTube, resulting in an "all-out gang war". Headie responded with a diss track "Know Better".

In March of that year, his concert at the Barbican Centre was shut down by the Metropolitan Police. The police had previously linked his music in connection with rising knife crime in London. In an interview in April, Headie claimed that "Only a fool would say that drill music is the root of the problem of violence in the capital." Associations between London gang culture ("the war between Tottenham and Wood Green"), drill music and social media were examined in a BBC Radio Four programme File on Four 8 March 2020, focused on three violent murders.

On 17 November 2020, Adjei was involved in an altercation with rapper Tion Wayne on board a flight from Dubai to London in which the rapper Morrisson tried to break up shortly after boarding.

On 23 November 2022, Adjei was involved in a fight against rapper E1 (3x3) at the Sony Music Building in London. An employee said "It was one of the most frightening experiences of my life. You don’t expect to go to work and to be dragged into something like this…there was blood on the floor [...] It was terrifying." Sony issued a statement, saying "Sony Music takes the safety of its staff very seriously. This is now a police matter, so we cannot comment further."

== Discography ==
=== Studio albums ===
List of studio albums, with release date, label, and selected chart positions shown
Title	Album details	Peak chart positions							Certifications
Title	Album details	UK	UK R&B	AUS	BEL	CAN	IRE	NLD	Certifications
Edna	Released: 9 October 2020; Label: Relentless; Format: CD, digital download, streaming	1	2	22	84	86	3	36	BPI: Gold
The Last One	Released: 28 June 2024; Label: Columbia, Sony; Format: CD, digital download, streaming	52	4	—	—	—	—	—	

=== Mixtapes ===
List of commercial mixtapes, with release date, label, and selected chart positions shown
Title	Album details	Peak chart positions			Certifications
Title	Album details	UK	UK R&B	IRE	Certifications
Headz or Tails	Released: 29 March 2014; Label: Self-released; Format: Digital download, streaming	—	—	—	
The One	Released: 2 February 2018; Label: Self-released; Format: Digital download, streaming	—	—	—	
The One Two	Released: 22 June 2018; Label: Self-released; Format: Digital download, streaming	32	14	—	
Music x Road	Released: 23 August 2019; Label: Relentless; Format: Digital download, streaming	5	4	71	BPI: Silver
Too Loyal for My Own Good	Released: 1 October 2021; Label: Relentless; Format: Digital download, streaming	26	5	93	

=== Collaborative mixtapes ===
List of collaboration mixtapes, with release date, label, and selected chart positions shown
Title	Album details	Peak chart positions	
Title	Album details	UK	UK R&B
Sticks & Stones (with RV)	Released: 25 December 2016; Label: Self-released; Format: Digital download, streaming	—	—
Drillers x Trappers (with RV)	Released: 17 July 2017; Label: Starish Entertainment; Format: Digital download, streaming	—	—
Drillers x Trappers II (with RV)	Released: 22 March 2019; Label: Self-released; Format: Digital download, streaming	21	9
Gang (with Fred again..)	Released: 3 April 2020; Label: Relentless; Format: Digital download, streaming	49	10
Strength to Strength (with K-Trap)	Released: 22 September 2023; Label: One Records, Thousand8; Format: Digital download, streaming	4	1

=== Compilations ===
List of compilation albums, with release date and label shown
Title	Album details
No Borders: European Compilation Project	Released: 11 November 2022; Label: Relentless; Format: Digital download, streaming

=== Singles ===
==== As lead artist ====
List of singles, with year released, selected chart positions and certifications, and album name shown
Title	Year	Peak chart positions										Certifications	Album
Title	Year	UK	UK R&B	AUS	BEL Bub.	CAN	GER	IRE	NLD	NZ Hot	US Bub.	Certifications	Album
"On Sight"	2014	—	—	—	—	—	—	—	—	—	—		Headz or Tails
"Golden Boot" (with RV)	2016	—	—	—	—	—	—	—	—	—	—		The One
"Know Better" (with RV)	2016	—	—	—	—	—	—	—	—	—	—	BPI: Silver	The One
"Tracksuit Love" (with Kenny Allstar)	2018	—	—	—	—	—	—	—	—	—	—		Block Diaries
"18Hunna" (featuring Dave)	2019	6	3	—	—	—	—	75	—	—	—	BPI: Gold	Music x Road
"All Day"	2019	—	—	—	—	—	—	—	—	—	—		Music x Road
"Back to Basics" (featuring Skepta)	2019	42	27	—	—	—	—	—	—	—	—	BPI: Silver	Music x Road
"Both"	2019	13	7	—	—	—	—	64	—	—	—	BPI: Platinum	Music x Road
"Charades" (with Fred Again)	2020	57	—	—	—	—	—	—	—	—	—		Gang
"Rose Gold"	2020	49	32	—	—	—	—	—	—	—	—		Non-album single
"Only You Freestyle" (with Drake)	2020	5	2	51	24	37	—	13	54	6	18	BPI: Platinum; MC: Gold; RMNZ: Gold	Edna
"Ain't It Different" (featuring AJ Tracey and Stormzy)	2020	2	2	16	16	—	53	5	52	4	—	BPI: Platinum; ARIA: Platinum; IFPI AUS: Gold; RMNZ: Platinum	Edna
"Breathing"	2020	—	—	—	—	—	—	—	—	—	—		Edna
"Princess Cuts" (featuring Young T & Bugsey)	2020	11	7	—	—	—	—	29	—	—	—	BPI: Gold	Edna
"Back To Back" (with RV)	2020	—	—	—	—	—	—	—	—	—	—		Rico Vondelle
"Siberia" (featuring Burna Boy)	2021	—	—	—	—	—	—	—	—	—	—		Edna (Deluxe)
"Daily Duppy" (with GRM Daily)	2021	—	—	—	—	—	—	—	—	—	—		Non-album singles
"Pound Signs"	2021	49	17	—	—	—	—	82	—	—	—		Non-album singles
"2 Chains"	2021	59	28	—	—	—	—	—	—	—	—		Too Loyal for My Own Good
"Cry"	2021	66	27	—	—	—	—	—	—	—	—		Too Loyal for My Own Good
"Came in the Scene"	2022	67	28	—	—	—	—	—	—	—	—		Non-album single
"My Way" (with Smallgod, Eugy and Medikal)	2022	—	—	—	—	—	—	—	—	—	—		Connecting The Dots
"22 Carats" (with Gazo)	2022	—	—	—	—	—	—	—	—	—	—		No Borders: European Compilation Project
"Cloud" (with Luciano)	2022	—	—	—	—	—	—	—	—	—	—		No Borders: European Compilation Project
"Bigger Than Life" (with Frenna)	2022	—	—	—	—	—	—	—	—	—	—		No Borders: European Compilation Project
"Can't Be Us" (with Abra Cadabra and Bandokay)	2022	27	8	—	—	—	—	66	—	—	—		Non-album singles
"Illegal"	2022	—	—	—	—	—	—	—	—	—	—		Non-album singles
"50s"	2022	40	12	—	—	—	—	81	—	—	—		Non-album singles
"Martin's Sofa"	2023	9	5	—	—	—	—	17	—	—	—	BPI: Silver	The Last One
"Guilty" (with RV)	2023	—	—	—	—	—	—	—	—	—	—		Inconspicuous (Deluxe)
"Rivals" (with Bandokay)	2023	—	—	—	—	—	—	—	—	—	—		M.A.R.K
"Catfish" (with K-Trap and M1onTheBeat)	2023	—	—	—	—	—	—	—	—	—	—		Strength to Strength
"Park Chinois" (with K-Trap)	2023	39	18	—	—	—	—	—	—	—	—		Strength to Strength
"Triple Threat" (with K-Trap and Clavish)	2023	31	13	—	—	—	—	—	—	—	—		Strength to Strength
"Skinfade" (with M1onTheBeat)	2023	—	—	—	—	—	—	—	—	—	—		M1onTheBeat The Mixtape
"Socials"	2024	—	—	—	—	—	—	—	—	—	—		Non-album single
"Cry No More" (with Stormzy featuring Tay Keith)	2024	33	—	—	—	—	—	59	—	13	—		The Last One
"Play For Keeps" (with RV and Abra Cadabra)	2024	—	—	—	—	—	—	—	—	—	—		Fresh Prince of Tottenham 2
"I Still Know Better"	2024	—	—	—	—	—	—	—	—	—	—		The Last One
"Tipsy" (featuring Aitch)	2024	—	—	—	—	—	—	—	—	—	—		The Last One
"Gang Ties" (with Onefour)	2024	—	—	—	—	—	—	—	—	10	—		Look at Me Now
"—" denotes a recording that did not chart or was not released in that territory.

==== As featured artist ====
List of singles, with year released, selected chart positions and certifications, and album name shown
Title	Year	Peak chart positions								Certifications	Album
Title	Year	UK	UK R&B	BEL Bub.	CAN	FRA	IRE	NLD	US	Certifications	Album
"Missing" (Belly Squad featuring Headie One)	2018	—	—	—	—	—	—	—	—	BPI: Silver	Bon Appétit
"I Spy" (Krept and Konan featuring Headie One and K-Trap)	2019	18	11	—	—	—	—	—	—	BPI: Gold	Revenge Is Sweet
"Don't Rush" (Young T & Bugsey featuring Headie One)	2019	19	7	12	64	31	24	91	56	BPI: Platinum; MC: Gold; SNEP: Gold; RIAA: Gold; RMNZ: Platinum	Plead The 5th
"Audacity" (Stormzy featuring Headie One)	2019	6	2	—	—	—	8	—	—	BPI: Gold	Heavy Is the Head
"Impress Me" (Scribz Riley featuring Headie One)	2020	—	—	—	—	—	—	—	—		Non-album singles
"Chop It" (Dezzie featuring Headie One, Sykes Beats and ONE RECORDS)	2020	—	—	—	—	—	—	—	—		Non-album singles
"Opp Diddy Bop" (Dezzie featuring Headie One and ONE RECORDS)	2020	—	—	—	—	—	—	—	—		Uno Uno
"Don't Judge Me" (FKA twigs featuring Headie One and Fred again..)	2021	—	—	—	—	—	—	—	—		Non-album singles
"Sinner" (Smallgod featuring Headie One, O'Kenneth, Kwaku DMC and Lp2loose)	2021	—	—	—	—	—	—	—	—		Non-album singles
"Wandsworth to Bullingdon" (Fredo featuring Headie One)	2021	36	8	—	—	—	—	—	—		Independence Day
"Ring My Line" (King Promise featuring Headie One)	2021	—	—	—	—	—	—	—	—		5 Star
"Aston Martin" (Shiva featuring Headie One)	2021	—	—	—	—	—	—	—	—		Non-album single
"10von10 (Remix)" (Pajel featuring Headie One and Luciano)	2021	—	—	—	—	—	—	—	—		Seelenfrieden
"Warzone" (M Huncho featuring Headie One)	2022	41	22	—	—	—	—	—	—		Chasing Euphoria
"Local" (Abra Cadabra featuring Headie One and Bandokay)	2022	—	—	—	—	—	—	—	—		Non-album single
"Let's Talk Money" (Slim featuring Headie One)	2023	—	—	—	—	—	—	—	—		Still Working 2
"I Know You Care" (Nemzzz featuring Headie One)	2024	—	—	—	—	—	—	—	—		Do Not Disturb (Deluxe)
"Sexyy Red" (Booter Bee featuring Headie One)	2024	—	—	—	—	—	—	—	—		True Stories
"Zeros" (cassö and Jazzy featuring Headie One)	2024	92	—	—	—	—	—	—	—		TBA
"YO" (Remix) (Chy Cartier featuring Headie One)	2024	—	—	—	—	—	—	—	—		TBA
"Friday Prayer" (AJ Tracey featuring Headie One & Aitch)	2025	—	—	—	—	—	—	—	—		Don't Die Before You're Dead
"—" denotes a recording that did not chart or was not released in that territory.

=== Promotional singles ===
List of promotional singles, with year released and album name
Title	Year	Album
"Shellings Riddim" (with Tel Money and Lowkey)	2017	Non-album singles
"The Jugg" (with RV)	2017	Non-album singles
"90 on the M" (with Colo)	2017	Non-album singles
"Live in the T"	2017	Non-album singles
"Profit" (with BKO & Dun D)	2017	Non-album singles
"Banter on Me"	2018	Non-album singles
"Free Bradders" (with Mikabeats, RV, Skat and Tuggzy)	2018	The One
"In to Win",	2018	Non-album singles
"Issa Mood" (featuring Not3s)	2018	Non-album singles
"Of Course"	2018	Non-album singles
"Not Over Yet (Remix)" (KSI featuring Headie One and Nines)	2022	Non-album singles
"More Money More Problems"	2023	Non-album singles

=== Other charted songs ===
List of non-single chart appearances, with year released and album name shown
Title	Year	Peak chart positions		Album
Title	Year	UK	NZ Hot	Album
"Rubbery Bandz"	2019	86	—	Music x Road
"Hard to Believe"	2019	79	—	Top Boy (A Selection of Music Inspired by the Series)
"Gang" (with Fred Again)	2020	51	—	Gang
"Parlez-vous anglais" (featuring Aitch)	2020	24	—	Edna
"Siberia" (featuring Burna Boy)	2021	35	27	Edna
"Extra Sleeve" (K-Trap featuring Headie One)	2022	71	—	The Last Whip II

=== Guest appearances ===
List of non-single guest appearances, with year released, other artist(s) and album name shown
Title	Year	Other artist(s)	Album
"No Convo"	2017	K-Trap	K-Trap Presents The Last Whip Mixtape
"Drill"	2018	Loski, RV	Call Me Loose
"Ugly Faces (Remix)"	2018	Smoke Boys, RV	Dont Panic II
"Art Of War"	2018	Fumez the Engineer, M Huncho, RV	The Mix-tape 2
"Why"	2019	Carns Hill, K-Trap, LD, Blade Brown	Hurt Your Parents Feelings
"Touring"	2019	Slim	Still Working
"No Caller"	2019	K-Trap	No Magic
"Kris Jenner"	2019	RV	Savage
"Hard To Believe"	2019	None	Top Boy (A Selection of Music Inspired by the Series)
"Once In A While"	2019	OFB, Bandokay	Frontstreet
"Money Moves"	2019	Lil Berete	1 Way Out
"PCX"	2020	DigDat	Ei8ht Mile
"Head Huncho"	2020	M Huncho	Huncholini the 1st
"Porsche"	2020	Yxng Bane	Quarantine: The Lost Files
"Money, Power, Respect"	2020	Jonna Fraser	Calma
"Ringaling"	2020	Nines, Odeal	Crabs in a Bucket
"Impress Me"	2020	Scribz Riley	Wish Me Luck
"Opp Biddy Bop"	2021	Dezzie	Uno Uno
"Street Politics"	2021	Dezzie, K-Trap	Uno Uno
"Spaghetti"	2021	Hamza, Gazo	140 BPM 2
"Done Know"	2021	Chip	Snakes & Ladders
"Arrived"	2021	Luciano	Aqua
"Wandsworth to Bullingdon"	2021	Fredo	Independence Day
"Air BnB"	2021	M1llionz	Provisional Licence
"Fuk How You Feel"	2021	Akz	The Come Up 1
"10von10 (Remix)"	2022	Pajel	Seelenfrieden
"Ring My Line"	2022	King Promise	5 Star
"Thalasso"	2022	Doums	Pull á capuche et billets mauves
"Life Lessons"	2022	Luciano	Majestic
"Extra Sleeve"	2022	K-Trap	The Last Whip II
"Operation Fortress"	2023	D-Block Europe	DBE World
"Sexyy Red"	2024	Booter Bee	True Stories
"59901R"	2024	Potter Payper	Thanks for Hating
"Say Less"	2024	Chivv	Alvast Bedankt
"Gr4vey4rd Shift"	2025	Aitch	4 (Deluxe)

== Filmography ==
=== Web ===
Year	Title	Role	Notes	Ref.
2018	Shiro's Story	Ty's Friend	Part 3 (Short YouTube Series); Cameo	
