= Bandokay =

British rapper (born 2001)

- Born: Kemani Tutti Kane Duggan; 9 May 2001 (age 25); Tottenham, London, England
- Genres: British hip hop; UK drill
- Occupations: Rapper; songwriter
- Years active: 2018–present
- Label: No Requests
- Member of: OFB

Kemani Tutti Kane Duggan (born 9 May 2001), known professionally as Bandokay (formerly stylized as BandoKay), is an English rapper. He is a member of the UK drill group OFB.

Beginning his career in 2018 alongside fellow OFB rappers SJ and Double Lz, Bandokay gained prominence in 2019 after release of Frontstreet. The mixtape peaked at number 36 on the UK Albums Chart and was followed by Drill Commandmants, released in 2021.

== Early life ==
Kemani Tutti Kane Duggan was born on 9 May 2001, in Tottenham, London, England. He is the son of Mark Duggan, who was fatally shot by armed police in 2011. After his father's death, Duggan was looked after by Marcus Knox-Hooke, one of his father's friends. This would lead Knox-Hooke to form a program to look after vulnerable youth in Tottenham.

Sometime afterwards, Duggan began secondary school; however, he was kicked out three months after beginning due to his inability to control his behaviour.

== Career ==
=== 2018-19: Early career and Frontstreet ===
In a 2022 video showcasing his daily life, Bandokay stated that Kash, a member of OFB, was the main reason that he would take a career in music seriously; according to Bandokay, Kash would call him in order to write lyrics.

Bandokay began his musical career in early 2018 with the release of "Bruck It" alongside Kash, Ys, Double Lz and Boogie B. In late 2018, he released "Bad B on the Nizz" alongside Double Lz and SJ; according to an interview with Complex Networks, the song gained one million views in a week. In the same interview, Double Lz said that the first song that he and Bandokay made was created in 2017; however, it was never released. The three would, for sometime, adopt the name Y.OFB ("Young OFB"); the "Y." prefix would later be dropped in 2019.

On 14 November 2019, The group released their debut mixtape Frontstreet; the mixtape peaked at number 36 on the UK Albums Chart. The mixtape also included "Ambush", Which was certified silver by the British Phonographic Industry.

=== 2019-21: Drill Commandments ===
Following the release of Frontstreet, Bandokay would appear on Kenny Allstar's Mad About Bars freestyle series in 2019 and release "Lightwork Freestyle" in 2020, both of which featured Double Lz. In 2020, he would release "OT Bopping" with Double Lz, which peaked at number 91 on the UK Singles Chart.

In the beginning of 2020, Bandokay was named within the top 20 British MCs to watch in 2020 by Complex Networks.

In March 2020, Bandokay would appear alongside Double Lz on iLL BLU's "Magic" and on "War" by Mastermind, which would peak at number 46 and number 39 on the UK Singles Chart, respectively. In May, he would release "Patient", which would peak at number 92.

In July, Bandokay would appear on Deno's "Circles", also featuring Double Lz; the song peaked at number 36. In October, Bandokay would release "BLM" with Double Lz and Abra Cadabra, which peaked at number 63. During a 2020 interview with Vice regarding "BLM", Double Lz and Bandokay teased that another mixtape was in the works, which included features from Loski, Abra Cadabra, and others.

The mixtape, named Drill Commandments, was released by the two on 19 March 2021; it would peak at number 53 on the UK Albums Chart.

=== 2021-present: No Requests and solo album ===
In June 2021, Bandokay released "Slide"; it peaked at number 74.

In January 2022, Bandokay announced in a video that he and Double Lz were to release solo albums. He would also release "Praise the Lord" in the same month. In February, Bandokay was signed to No Requests, created by Tiffany Calver in collaboration with Polydor Records. In March, he would release "Tower Hill Freestyle", named after an area in Saint Andrew Parish, Jamaica.

== Legal issues ==
In 2022, Bandokay, alongside Double Lz, was charged with violent disorder following a 2021 incident at a Selfridges store where two people were stabbed.

On 15 January 2024, Bandokay was summoned at Thames Magistrates Court and charged with possession of a firearm and possession of ammunition without a license.

On 2 July 2024, BandoKay was due to face trial at the Old Bailey accused of possessing a Tokarev pistol and 22 bulleted cartridges with intent to endanger life last year. Just before his trial was due to start, however, he pleaded guilty to lesser offences of possession with intent to cause fear of violence. The court was told that the minimum sentence for possession of an illegal firearm was five years in prison. Judge Philip Katz KC remanded the defendants into custody to be sentenced on 5 July 2024. On 5 July 2024, Kemani Duggan was sentenced to five years in prison.

== Discography ==
=== Mixtapes ===
List of mixtapes, with selected details
Title	Details	Peak chart positions		Certifications
Title	Details	UK	IRE	Certifications
Frontstreet (with OFB, SJ and Double Lz)	Released: 14 November 2019; Label: Rattrap Reality; Format: Online download	36	97	BPI: Silver
Drill Commandments (with OFB and Double Lz)	Released: 19 March 2021; Label: Rattrap Reality; Format: Online download	53	—	
M.A.R.K.	Released: 30 June 2023; Label: No Requests Limited; Format: CD, Streaming, Digital download	—	—	
"—" denotes a recording that did not chart or was not released in that territory.

=== Singles ===
==== As main artist ====
Title	Year	Peak chart positions	Certifications	Album
Title	Year	UK	Certifications	Album
"Bad B on the Nizz" (with Double Lz and SJ)	2018	—		Non-album singles
"Reality" (with Double Lz and SJ)	2018	—		Non-album singles
"Purge" (with Double Lz and SJ)	2019	—		Non-album singles
"Next Up?" (with Double Lz and SJ)	2019	—	BPI: Silver	Non-album singles
"Hardest Bars Freestyle" (with Double Lz and SJ)	2019	—		Non-album singles
"Ambush" (with Double Lz and SJ)	2019	—	BPI: Silver	Frontstreet
"Mad About Bars" (with Double Lz)	2019	—		Non-album singles
"Lightwork Freestyle" (with Double Lz)	2020	—		Non-album singles
"OT Bopping" (with Double Lz)	2020	91		Non-album singles
"Let Man Know" (with Double Lz and Abra Cadabra)	2020	—		Non-album singles
"Patient"	2020	92		Non-album singles
"Full Flick"	2020	—		Non-album singles
"BLM" (with Double Lz and Abra Cadabra)	2020	63		Non-album singles
"What's Goodie" (with Double Lz)	2020	—		Non-album singles
"Ahlie" (with Double Lz and Izzpot)	2021	—		Non-album singles
"YKTV" (with Double Lz and Izzpot)	2021	—		Non-album singles
"Daily Duppy" (with Double Lz and Izzpot)	2021	—		Non-album singles
"Hashtag" (with Double Lz)	2021	—		Non-album singles
"Flick of the Wrist" (with Double Lz)	2021	—		Drill Commandments
"Slide"	2021	74		Non-album singles
"G Lock"	2021	—		Non-album singles
"Praise the Lord"	2022	—		Non-album singles
"Tower Hill Freestyle"	2022	—		Non-album singles
"Mad About Bars"	2022	—		Non-album singles
"Can't Be Us" (with Headie One and Abra Cadabra)	2022	27		Non-album singles
"Too Many Lies" (with LD)	2022	—		Non-album singles
"Local" (with Headie One and Abra Cadabra)	2022	—		Non-album singles
"LightWork" (with Pressplay)	2022	—		Non-album singles
"—" denotes a recording that did not chart or was not released in that territory.

==== As featured artist ====
Title	Year	Peak chart positions	Certifications	Album
Title	Year	UK	Certifications	Album
"Mazza" (Mitch featuring Bandokay and Double Lz)	2019	—		Frontstreet
"Skrr" (Yxng Bane featuring Bandokay and Double Lz)	2019	—		Non-album singles
"Caution" (Blitty featuring Bandokay)	2019	—		Non-album singles
"Drip No Drown" (Dezzie featuring Bandokay)	2019	—		Non-album singles
"Magic" (iLL BLU featuring Bandokay and Double Lz)	2020	46	BPI: Silver	The BLUPRINT
"War" (Mastermind featuring Bandokay)	2020	39		Non-album single
"Hate On Us" (Frosty ft. Bandokay and Double Lz)	2020	—		Under Surveillance
"Circles" (Deno featuring Bandokay and Double Lz)	2020	36		Boy Meets World
"Double Up" (Sean1da featuring Bandokay and Double Lz)	2020	—		Non-album singles
"However Do You Want It" (Swarmz featuring Krept & Konan and Bandokay)	2020	61		Non-album singles
"Impressed" (Dezzie featuring Bandokay)	2021	—		Non-album singles
"—" denotes a recording that did not chart or was not released in that territory.

==== Guest appearances ====
List of non-single guest appearances, with other performing artists
Title	Year	Other artist(s)	Album
"Shots (Remix)"	2019	Morrisson, Burner, V9, Snap Capone	Non-album singles
"On Deck (Remix)"	2020	Abra Cadabra, RV, Kush, Lowkey, Dezzie, Double Lz	Non-album singles
"Youngest in Charge (Remix)"	2021	SJ, Dezzie, Izzpot, Double Lz	Non-album singles
"Lean Wit It (Remix)"	2021	Abra Cadabra, Blitty, Kush, Bradz, Kash One7, Akz, YF, Double Lz	Non-album singles
"Coming For You (Remix)"	2021	SwitchOTR, Loski, Izzpot	Non-album singles

== Awards and nominations ==
Year	Award	Nominated work	Category	Result	Ref.
2020	GRM Daily Rated Awards	Frontstreet	Mixtape of the Year	Nominated	
2020	GRM Daily Rated Awards	Himself and Double Lz	Soapy of the year	Nominated	
