= Made in the Pyrex =

Mixtape by Digga D
- Released: 26 February 2021
- Recorded: 2020
- Genre: British hip-hop; UK drill
- Length: 34:18
- Label: CGM
- Producer: AoD; BKay; Cage; CeeBeats; Chris Rich; Ghosty; Glvck; HL8; Itchy; Lizz Miribaby; M1OnTheBeat; Scott Styles; Scott Supreme; The Elements; Trinz; X10; 5ive Beats

Digga D chronology
Double Tap Diaries (2019)	Made in the Pyrex (2021)	Noughty by Nature (2022)

Singles from Made in the Pyrex
- 1. "Woi" Released: 2 July 2020; 2. "Chingy (It's Whatever)" Released: 15 October 2020; 3. "Bringing It Back" Released: 4 February 2021; 4. "Toxic" Released: 14 February 2021; 5. "Bluuwuu" Released: 25 February 2021

Made in the Pyrex (abbreviated as MITP) is the second commercial mixtape by British rapper Digga D. It was released on 26 February 2021 by CGM. It features guest appearances from AJ Tracey, M1llionz, Sav'o and ZK.

== Singles and promotion ==
In 2 July 2020, Digga D released the single "Woi", which gained widespread recognition worldwide. On 15 October 2020, the follow-up single was released titled "Chingy (It's Whatever)". On 4 February 2021, the single "Bringing It Back" with AJ Tracey was released. The song topped the UK's Official Trending Chart and debuted at number 5 on the UK Singles Chart. On 14 February, the single "Toxic" was released. He also revealed the tracklist of the mixtape on 19 February 2021. On 25 February, the music video for the single "Bluuwuu" was released.

== Critical reception ==
Professional ratings
Review scores
Source	Rating
Clash	8/10
Gigwise	6/10 stars
The Guardian	4/5 stars
NME	3/5 stars

Ahead of the mixtape's release, GRM Daily wrote "The CBO could have been the end of Digga D’s career in drill; it certainly would have been for many of his colleagues within the scene, as there are few rappers who can maintain and improve on interest from fans in their music after being censored by the police [...] However, Digga D was insistent he would not fade into obscurity, and instead begun furiously writing, crafting ways to get around the censorship of the police by coding his language, littering his verses with intricate double entendres, metaphors and similes so only those in the know would be able to decipher it". Mixtape Madness wrote "the rising hit-maker has flown to the forefront of the game with his care-free attitude, comedic take, and top-notch artistry. Helping pave the lane for many Drill artists yet to arise, the promising talent has proved himself as a force to be reckoned with" and said the mixtape is "filled from start to finish with an assortment of sounds that supporters have been patiently waiting for".

=== Accolades ===
The single "Woi" was nominated for "Song of the Year" at the MOBO Awards, and Complex ranked it at the top of their best songs of 2020 list.

== Commercial performance ==
Made in the Pyrex reached No. 3 on the UK Albums Chart and was noted for being the "highest charting project to date for a millennium-born UK rapper, and the highest-charting independent UK Drill project on the Official Chart so far."

== Track listing ==
Made in the Pyrex track listing
No.	Title	Producer(s)	Length
1.	"Intro"	5ive Beats	1:15
2.	"Bluuwuu"	Glvck	3:05
3.	"Chingy (It's Whatever)"	Itchy	2:27
4.	"Bringing It Back" (with AJ Tracey)	The Elements; AoD	3:10
5.	"No Chorus" (with M1llionz)	Itchy	3:37
6.	"Woi"	M1OnTheBeat; CeeBeats	3:02
7.	"Clout Is Killing My People"	Ghosty; BKay	0:43
8.	"Folknem" (with Sav'o & ZK)	X10; HL8; Scott Supreme; Scott Styles	2:57
9.	"My Brucky"	Cage	2:46
10.	"Gun Man Sound"	Chris Rich	2:15
11.	"Window"	Lizz Miribaby	2:08
12.	"Trust Issues (I'm Joking I Only Trust My Mum)"	Cage	3:39
13.	"Toxic" (Bonus Track)	Trinz	3:10
Total length:			34:18

== Charts ==
Chart performance for Made in the Pyrex
Chart (2021)	Peak position
Australian Albums (ARIA)	90
Irish Albums (OCC)	10
UK Albums (OCC)	3
UK R&B Albums (OCC)	1

== Certifications ==
Certifications for Made in the Pyrex
Region	Certification	Certified units/sales
United Kingdom (BPI)	Gold	100,000^{‡}
^{‡} Sales+streaming figures based on certification alone.
