= List of Official Albums Streaming Chart number ones of 2022 =

British Music Chart

The Official Albums Streaming Chart is a weekly music chart in the United Kingdom which calculates the most popular albums on audio streaming sites.

== Number ones ==
Key
No.	nth album to top the Official Albums Streaming Chart
re	Return of an album to number one

Contents

No.	Artist (Note: The artist, song, date of reaching number one and number of weeks at number one are those given by the OCC.)	Album	Record label (Note: The record labels are those given by the OCC.)	Reached number one (for the week ending)	Weeks at number one	Ref.
re	Michael Bublé	Christmas	Reprise	6 January 2022	1	
re	Ed Sheeran	=	Asylum	13 January 2022	1	
87	The Weeknd	Dawn FM	Republic/XO	20 January 2022	2	
87	The Weeknd	Dawn FM	Republic/XO	27 January 2022	2	
88	Meat Loaf	Hits Out of Hell	Sony Music	3 February 2022	1	
re	Ed Sheeran	=	Asylum	10 February 2022	4	
re	Ed Sheeran	=	Asylum	17 February 2022	4	
re	Ed Sheeran	=	Asylum	24 February 2022	4	
re	Ed Sheeran	=	Asylum	3 March 2022	4	
89	Central Cee	23	Central Cee	10 March 2022	2	
89	Central Cee	23	Central Cee	17 March 2022	2	
89	Lil Durk	7220	Ministry of Sound	24 March 2022	1	
90	ArrDee	Pier Pressure	Island	31 March 2022	1	
91	Machine Gun Kelly	Mainstream Sellout	Bad Boy/Interscope	7 April 2022	1	
re	Ed Sheeran	=	Asylum	14 April 2022	2	
re	Ed Sheeran	=	Asylum	21 April 2022	2	
92	Digga D	Noughty by Nature	CGM/EGA	28 April 2022	1	
re	Ed Sheeran	=	Asylum	5 May 2022	1	
93	Future	I Never Liked You	Epic/Freebandz	12 May 2022	1	
94	Jack Harlow	Come Home the Kids Miss You	Atlantic	19 May 2022	1	
95	Kendrick Lamar	Mr. Morale & the Big Steppers	Polydor	26 May 2022	1	
96	Harry Styles	Harry's House	Columbia	2 June 2022	4	
96	Harry Styles	Harry's House	Columbia	9 June 2022	4	
96	Harry Styles	Harry's House	Columbia	16 June 2022	4	
96	Harry Styles	Harry's House	Columbia	23 June 2022	4	
97	Drake	Honestly, Nevermind	OVO/Republic	30 June 2022	1	
re	Harry Styles	Harry's House	Columbia	7 July 2022	5	
re	Harry Styles	Harry's House	Columbia	14 July 2022	5	
re	Harry Styles	Harry's House	Columbia	21 July 2022	5	
re	Harry Styles	Harry's House	Columbia	28 July 2022	5	
re	Harry Styles	Harry's House	Columbia	4 August 2022	5	
98	Beyoncé	Renaissance	Columbia/Parkwood Entertainment	11 August 2022	3	
98	Beyoncé	Renaissance	Columbia/Parkwood Entertainment	18 August 2022	3	
98	Beyoncé	Renaissance	Columbia/Parkwood Entertainment	25 August 2022	3	
re	Harry Styles	Harry's House	Columbia	1 September 2022	5	
re	Harry Styles	Harry's House	Columbia	8 September 2022	5	
re	Harry Styles	Harry's House	Columbia	15 September 2022	5	
re	Harry Styles	Harry's House	Columbia	22 September 2022	5	
re	Harry Styles	Harry's House	Columbia	29 September 2022	5	
99	D-Block Europe	Lap 5	D-Block Europe	6 October 2022	2	
99	D-Block Europe	Lap 5	D-Block Europe	13 October 2022	2	
re	Ed Sheeran	=	Asylum	20 October 2022	1	
100	Lil Baby	It's Only Me	Motown/Quality Control	27 October 2022	1	
101	Taylor Swift	Midnights	EMI	3 November 2022	2	
101	Taylor Swift	Midnights	EMI	10 November 2022	2	
102	Drake and 21 Savage	Her Loss	OVO/Republic	17 November 2022	1	
re	Taylor Swift	Midnights	EMI	24 November 2022	3	
re	Taylor Swift	Midnights	EMI	1 December 2022	3	
re	Taylor Swift	Midnights	EMI	8 December 2022	3	
103	Metro Boomin	Heroes & Villains	Island	15 December 2022	1	
104	SZA	SOS	RCA/Top Dawg	22 December 2022	1	
re	Michael Bublé	Christmas	Reprise	29 December 2022	1	
