= Ghosty (producer) =

British record producer (born 2000)

- Also known as: ghostyufo
- Born: Bradley Moss; 2 September 2000 (age 25); East London, England
- Genres: British hip hop; UK drill; Brooklyn drill; Bronx drill; trap; afrobeats; EDM; R&B
- Occupations: Record producer; DJ
- Instruments: FL Studio; piano; vocals; drums
- Years active: 2018–present
- Labels: Sony Music Publishing
- Website: ghostyufo.com

Bradley Robert Moss (born 2 September 2000), known professionally as Ghosty, is a British record producer, rapper, and DJ. He is regarded as one of the UK's best producers in the country's music industry. He gained widespread recognition in the UK music scene after he produced Digga D's "No Diet" in 2019, which peaked at number 20 on the UK Singles Chart and was later included on Double Tap Diaries. Other notable projects he has produced are Central Cee's "Molly" and 22Gz's mixtape Growth and Development.

== Early life and career ==
Ghosty was born and grew up in East London and Essex. At age 10, Bradley developed an interest in production after he was inspired by his neighbor DJing in the house. At the same age, he was gifted a Serato Mixtrack Pro by his mother, where he extensively developed his production and DJ'ing skills as he mixed jungle and drum and bass. He then downloaded FL Studio and continued his career by creating his portfolio as a producer and honing his skills in the genre, drawing early inspiration from American producers Lex Luger and Southside.

In 2019, during his A-levels, he produced Digga D's single "No Diet", which propelled him into popularity and resulted in him getting more placements from popular drill artists such as Headie One, Dave with the track "Paper Cuts", Unknown T's "Drip Drip" featuring V9, 22Gz, where Ghosty was co-featured in two of his albums, Growth and Development and The Blixky Tape in 2020 and 2021, respectively, and Russian rapper Obladaet's Players Club, which was certified 2× platinum by Believe Russia and was produced alongside British producers AV and Gotcha. Ghosty was signed to Sony Music Publishing in 2020 for a publishing deal.

== Musical style ==
Focusing in the drill subgenre of hip hop, Ghosty utilizes an idiosyncratic mix of heavy bass and 808 slides, rattling percussions and hi-hats, and dark, gothic melodies that discerned him from other existing producers in the drill community. He also does trap, an offshoot of hip hop of which he has released drum kits for production.

=== Producer tag ===
Ghosty is well known by his fan base for his producer tag Ghosty, which has a delayed and reverebed audio effect.

== Discography ==
=== Albums and mixtapes ===
List of mixtapes produced by Ghosty, with selected details
| Title | Details |
|---|---|
| Edna (Headie One) | Released: 9 October 2020; Label: Relentless Records, Sony Music; Formats: Streaming, digital download, CD |
| Frontstreet (OFB) | Released: 14 November 2019; Label: OFB; Formats: Streaming, digital download |
| Player's Club (OBLADAET) | Released: 26 March 2021; Label: KILL ME, OBLADAET; Formats: Streaming, digital download |
| Murk With a Mouth (V9) | Released: 19 November 2021; Label: GRM DAILY; Formats: Streaming, digital download |
| Violent Siblings (Horrid1 and Sav'o) | Released: 14 January 2022; Label: CGM RECORDS; Formats: Streaming, digital download |
| JOINTS (Blade Brown and K-Trap) | Released: 25 March 2022; Label: GRM DAILY RECORDS; Formats: Streaming, digital download |

=== Singles produced ===
List of singles as producer, with selected chart positions
| Title | Year | Album |
|---|---|---|
| "No Diet"" (Digga D) | 2019 | Double Tap Diaries |
| "Paper Cuts (single)" (Dave) | 2019 | Dave's Neighbourhood |
| "Kelvin's Coffin (single)" (NPK/SinSquad) | 2020 | |
| "Rose Gold" (Headie One) | 2020 | |
| "Suburban Pt.2" (22Gz) | 2020 | Growth and Development |
| "Allegedly" (Loski) | 2020 | - |
| "Everything Litty" ((CGM) ZK) | 2020 | - |
| "Neo" (Bizzy Banks) | 2020 | GMTO Vol. 1 (Get Money Take Over) |
| "David Beckham" (Obladaet) | 2021 | Players Club |
| "Molly" (Central Cee featuring Chris Rich) | 2021 | - |
| "Waka" (Ether Da Connect featuring Fivio Foreign and Swipey) | 2021 | M.O.D (Movies On Demand), Vol. 1 |
| "I'm Sorry Hun" (Nito NB) | 2021 | - |
| "Wildest" (with Sav'o featuring Horrid1) | 2021 | Violent Siblings |
| "Daily Duppy" (with GRM Daily and M1llionz) | 2021 | |

=== Extended plays ===
Extended play with selected chart positions
| Title | Details | Peak chart positions | | | Certifications |
| Title | Details | UK | SKY UK | US Rap | Certifications |
|---|---|---|---|---|---|
| Censored (Loski) | Released: 15 October 2021; Label: Since 93; Format: LP, Digital download | - | - | - | - |

== Awards and nominations ==
Awards and Nominations on Ghosty
| Year | Award | Work | Result |
|---|---|---|---|
| 2020 | GRM Rated Awards | Himself | Nominated |
| 2021 | GRM Rated Awards | Himself | Nominated |
| 2021 | DJ Mag British Awards | Himself | Nominated |
