= Bringing It Back (Digga D and AJ Tracey song) =

2021 song by Digga D and AJ Tracey

Single by Digga D and AJ Tracey

from the album Made in the Pyrex and Flu Game
- Released: 4 February 2021
- Genre: UK drill
- Length: 3:11
- Label: CGM
- Songwriters: Rhys Herbert; Ché Grant
- Producers: The Elements; AOD

Digga D singles chronology
"Chingy (It's Whatever)" (2020)	"Bringing It Back" (2021)	"Toxic" (2021)

AJ Tracey singles chronology
"One More Time" (2020)	"Bringing It Back" (2021)	"Anxious" (2021)

Music video
- "Bringing It Back" on YouTube

"Bringing It Back" is a song by British rappers Digga D and AJ Tracey. It was released as a digital download on 4 February 2021. The single peaked at number 5 on the UK Singles Chart, and topped the UK's Official Trending Chart. The song was released as the third single from Digga D's second commercial mixtape, Made in the Pyrex (2021) and AJ Tracey's second studio album, Flu Game (2021).

== Background ==
On 16 October 2020, Digga D and AJ Tracey teased the collaboration on social media by posting pictures of the two of them in the studio. The song was produced by The Elements and AOD, and written by Digga D and AJ Tracey.

== Music video ==
The official music video was directed by KC Locke and Digga D, released on 4 February 2021. The video referenced early stages of their careers by re-creating scenes from 1011's "Next Up" freestyle on Mixtape Madness and AJ Tracey's "Packages" Mic Check freestyle on Link Up TV.

== Personnel ==
Credits adapted from Tidal.

- Rhys Herbert – writer
- AJ Tracey – writer
- The Elements – producer
- AOD – producer

== Charts ==
Chart performance for "Bringing It Back"
Chart (2021)	Peak position
Ireland (IRMA)	23
New Zealand Hot Singles (RMNZ)	14
UK Singles (Official Charts)	5
UK Hip Hop/R&B (Official Charts)	3

== Certifications ==
Region	Certification	Certified units/sales
United Kingdom (BPI)	Silver	200,000^{‡}
^{‡} Sales+streaming figures based on certification alone.

== Release history ==
Release history for "Bringing It Back"
Region	Date	Format	Label
Various	4 February 2021	Digital download; streaming	Self-released
