= Wasted (Digga D song) =

2021 song by Digga D

Single by Digga D featuring ArrDee

from the album Noughty By Nature and Pier Pressure
- Released: 13 August 2021
- Genre: UK drill, grime
- Length: 2:54
- Label: CGM; EGA
- Songwriters: Rhys Herbert; Riley Davies
- Producers: Jacob Manson; Finn Wigan

Digga D singles chronology
| "Bluuwuu" (2021) | "Wasted" (2021) | "2K17" (2021) |

ArrDee singles chronology
| "Jiggy (Whiz)" (2021) | "Wasted" (2021) | "Wid It" (2021) |

Music video
- "Wasted (Visualizer)" on YouTube

"Wasted" is a song by British rappers Digga D featuring ArrDee. It was released as a single on 13 August 2021. The single peaked at number six on the UK Singles Chart, becoming Digga D's second single placed in the UK top 10. The single was certified platinum by the BPI 8 November 2024.

== Background ==
The song was first exclusively previewed in the East London jewellers establishment Trotters Jewellers' YouTube video with Digga D in April 2021 and later teased on TikTok on 14 July. The first verse of the song was later leaked on the internet, which grew the demand of the single. On 11 August, Digga announced the single and revealed that Brighton rapper ArrDee would be featured.

== Music and lyrics ==
"Wasted" was produced by Jacob Manson & Finn Wigan. The song samples T2 and Jodie Aysha's 2007 Bassline hit "Heartbroken". The instrumental has been described as "jumpy garage production". The lyrics were described as Digga D having "a cruddy approach" while ArrDee rapped with a "bullish" and "Geezer" narrative.

== Controversy ==
In the song, Digga D shouts out fellow Ladbroke Grove rapper AJ Tracey for using his flow, leading to fans wanting him featured on the song instead of ArrDee. In October 2021, Digga D's Instagram direct messages got leaked on the internet, with some CGM rappers saying they didn't like ArrDee's verse. Digga D later publicly apologized to ArrDee on stage at a live show saying "some things got out there that shouldn't have been out there, the song wouldn't be where it is without you." ArrDee responded to this in an interview saying "me and Digga are cool, I never felt no way" about the leaked DM's.

== Charts ==
Chart performance for "Wasted"
| Chart (2021) | Peak position |
|---|---|
| Ireland (IRMA) | 26 |
| UK Singles (OCC) | 6 |

== Certifications ==
| Region | Certification | Certified units/sales |
|---|---|---|
| United Kingdom (BPI) | Platinum | 600,000^{‡} |
^{‡} Sales+streaming figures based on certification alone.

== Release history ==
Release history for "Wasted"
| Region | Date | Format | Label |
|---|---|---|---|
| Various | 13 August 2021 | Digital download; streaming | CGM |
