= Double Tap Diaries =

Mixtape by Digga D
- Released: 17 May 2019
- Recorded: 2018–19
- Genre: British hip hop; UK drill
- Length: 28:24
- Label: CGM
- Producer: M1OnTheBeat; Ghosty; Nyge; NewERA Beats; Wizical Beats; BKay; ProdByWalkz

Digga D chronology
Double Tap Diaries (2019)	Made in the Pyrex (2021)

Singles from Double Tap Diaries
- 1. "No Diet" Released: 18 April 2019; 2. "P4DP" Released: 16 May 2019

Double Tap Diaries is the debut commercial mixtape by British rapper Digga D. It was released on 17 May 2019. It features guest appearances from Sav'o, Aystar, and KO. The mixtape peaked at number 11 on the UK Albums Chart, making it the highest charting drill album in the UK. Days after the mixtape release, he confirmed he was still in jail.

== Singles ==
The single "No Diet" was released on 18 April 2019, and peaked at number 20 in the UK Singles Chart. The music video garnered 1.6 million views in five days, received attention from rapper Stormzy, and the song was used in an Instagram video post by Zac Efron. "No Diet" was certified silver by the BPI a few months later. On 16 May 2019, the music video for "P4DP" was released, directed by Suave.

== Track listing ==
Double Tap Diaries track listing
No.	Title	Producer(s)	Length
1.	"P4DP"	M1OnTheBeat	2:27
2.	"No Diet"	Ghosty	3:18
3.	"Imagine" (featuring Sav'o)	M1OnTheBeat	3:07
4.	"They Wanna Know" (featuring Aystar)	Nyge; M1OnTheBeat	2:17
5.	"Never Fear"	NewERA Beats	2:14
6.	"What's Love?"	Wizical Beats	3:04
7.	"I Heard" (featuring KO)	BKay	3:14
8.	"Shotty Shane"	Ghosty	2:57
9.	"Double Tap Days"	ProdByWalkz	2:55
10.	"6+4"	M1OnTheBeat	2:59
Total length:			28:24

== Charts ==
Chart (2019)	Peak position
UK Albums (OCC)	11
