= B-Lovee =

American rapper (born 2000)

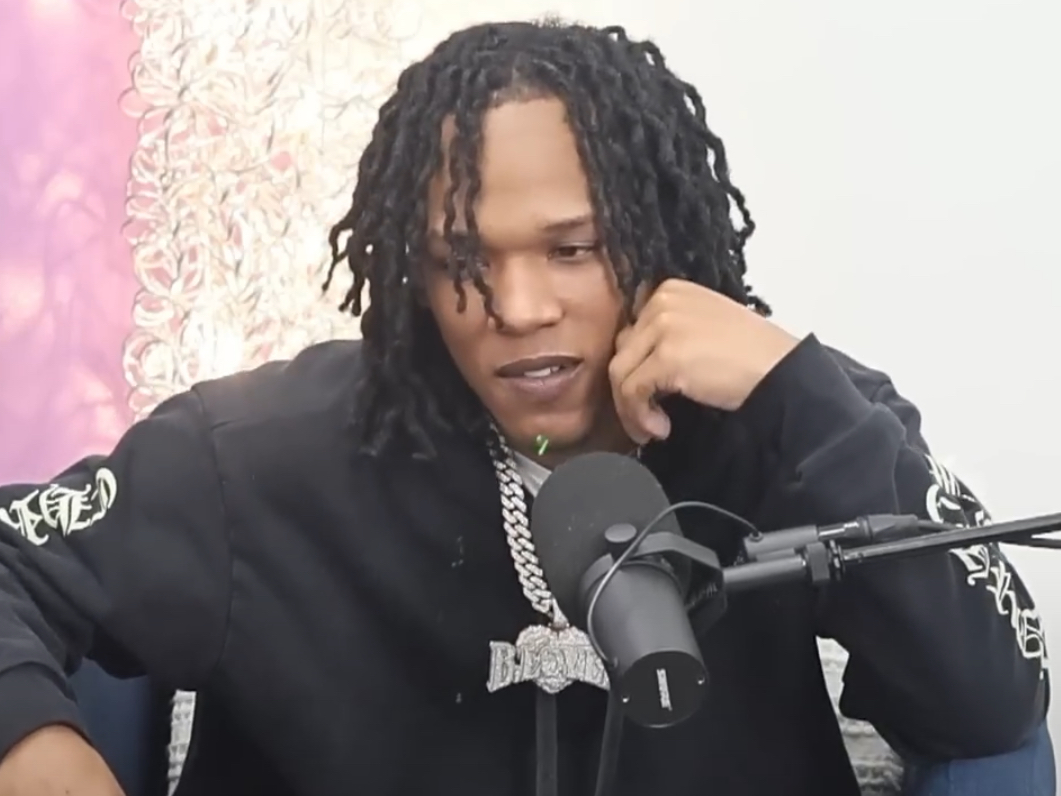
- B-Lovee in 2023

Background information
- Born: Qwayshawn Cannon; December 12, 2000 (age 25); New York City, U.S.
- Origin: The Bronx, New York City, New York, U.S.
- Occupation: Rapper
- Years active: 2015–present
- Labels: RECORDS, LLC Columbia

Qwayshawn Cannon (born December 12, 2000), known professionally as B-Lovee, is an American rapper. Born in Queens, he began his music career in 2015, pausing it until 2020, when he released his debut EP, Courtlandtbaby. He went viral after releasing his singles "IYKYK" and "My Everything" in 2021, later appearing on songs with larger rappers such as G Herbo, A Boogie wit da Hoodie and Digga D in 2022.

== Early life ==
Qwayshawn Cannon was born on December 12, 2000, in Queens, NY before moving to and mainly growing up in Melrose in the South Bronx area of the Bronx. He is of West Indian descent. He was primarily raised by his mother, a hair stylist, in the Andrew Jackson Houses of the South Bronx. Reflecting on his upbringing, he has said,

“Growing up in a project was like an adventure, you know, every day something going on – Good things are happening every day. Bad things happen too."

In high school, he was nicknamed "Buddy Love" after a character in The Nutty Professor.

== Career ==
In 2015, B-Lovee recorded a few songs before stopping due to a lack of motivation. He didn't record songs until the rise of Brooklyn drill in 2020, when he released his debut single, "No Hook". He released his debut EP, Courtlandtbaby, the same year.

In 2021, B-Lovee released "IYKYK", which was named by XXL as his biggest song. He also released "My Everything" after a leak of it went viral on TikTok; according to Lyrical Lemonade, "with 'My Everything', B Lovee pushed beyond New York and officially added a Bronx-born hit, through and through, to his resume.".

In 2022, B-Lovee released "What You Reckon" alongside Digga D; the song peaked at number 46 on the UK Singles Chart. An article from GRM Daily said that "What You Reckon" "leaves us anticipating what Noughty by Nature will offer when it arrives..." In April, he released Misunderstood, which included a feature from A Boogie Wit da Hoodie.

On January 11, 2023, B-Lovee's single "My Everything" was certified Gold by the Recording Industry Association of America, making him the first Bronx drill rapper to receive an official RIAA certification.

On May 19, 2023, B-Lovee released the extended play "Sorry 4 The Wait", which contained features from Sha EK and 2Rare. He released the deluxe edition on August 4, 2023, which contained additional features from Flo Milli, Luh Tyler, and YOVNGCHIMI.

== Discography ==
=== EPs ===
- Courtlandtbaby (2020)
- My Everything (2021)
- Misunderstood (2022)
- Sorry 4 The Wait (2023)

=== Charted singles ===
List of charted singles, with selected peak chart positions
Title	Year	Peak chart positions	Album
Title	Year	UK	Album
"What You Reckon" (with Digga D)	2022	46	Noughty by Nature

== Awards and nominations ==
Year	Organisation	Work	Award	Result
2023	iHeartRadio Music Awards	Himself	Best new hip hop artist	Nominated
