= Bringing It Back (disambiguation) =

"Bringing It Back" is a 1975 song by Elvis Presley.

Bringing It Back may also refer to:

- "Bringing It Back" (Digga D and AJ Tracey song), released in 2021
- Bringin' It Back!, a 2004 album by David Marez, nominated for the 2005 Tejano Music Award for Album of the Year
- "Bringing It Back", a 1972 song on the album Naturally by J.J. Cale
- "Bringing it Back", a 1974 cover of the J. J. Cale song by Kansas from their self titled debut album
- "Bringing It Back", a song by Black Eyed Peas from Bridging the Gap
