= SB.TV =

British music outlet

- Type: Privately held
- Industry: Entertainment, music
- Genre: British hip hop; grime; road rap; afroswing; UK drill; acoustic
- Founded: 2 November 2006 (active from 25 August 2010 onwards)
- Founders: Jamal Edwards
- Headquarters: 145-157 St John Street, London, United Kingdom
- Area served: United Kingdom, United States
- Website: sbtv.co.uk

SB.TV Global Ltd, also known as SB.TV or SmokeyBarz, is a British music media and creative cultural industry company founded by Jamal Edwards. The platform was created on 2 November 2006, and has its origins in urban music. Most of the content can be seen on its own YouTube channel, or on the official SB.TV website and includes freestyle raps and music videos. SB.TV has diversified into events and have curated stages at Bestival, Wireless, Outlook and other festivals. SB.TV were also invited to film interviews with a host of leading politicians at 10 Downing Street, including the Prime Minister David Cameron. Edwards has also built a relationship with the Royal Family and first interviewed Prince Charles in 2013.

The popularity of the channel among London's underground scene has led to features in RWD, The Observer, Time, Forbes, The Guardian, The Independent, Dazed & Confused, the Sunday Times Style magazine, Vanity Fair, Vogue and GQ while founder Jamal Edwards was on the front cover of Wired, Intelligent Life and the Emirates In-flight magazine. SB.TV also has assistant production credits from when Edwards was working as a junior runner for the BBC, and Tiger Aspect Productions as well as joining the young persons panel at The Guardian's new technology conference activate summit alongside Martha Lane Fox and others. SB.TV has been credited with 'discovering' Ed Sheeran whose music was aired exclusively on the channel in February 2010 – a full year before he achieved worldwide fame.

== History ==
SB.TV YouTube channel was created in 2006, when a teenage Jamal Edwards MBE (son of singer and TV presenter Brenda Edwards) began filming rap freestyles with a handycam, which he would then upload to his YouTube account. For the first three years, Edwards acted alone to provide amateur footage of many British grime artists, such as Dizzee Rascal, Wiley, Chipmunk and Tinchy Stryder, with the first SB.TV video being uploaded in February 2007. A Channel 4 documentary series, Bedroom to Boardroom that follows SB.TV was filmed in Edwards' first office, Camden Collective. As the channel began to attract more attention, it also began offering lifestyle interviews and event coverage, and a production team of ten people was established as a result.

The company has stated its aim to become a more "diverse youth lifestyle broadcaster", incorporating more genres of music. This has been seen in the inclusion of acoustic artists such as Ed Sheeran and other popular artists such as Jessie J, Nicki Minaj, The Wanted, and Pixie Lott. In February 2011, SB.TV launched their own music label Just Jam (an imprint of Sony RCA) and announced their first signing as east London MC, Maxsta. In March 2011, it had been suggested that the company were expected to go into business with restaurant chain Nando's.

In August 2011, Edwards was featured in a Google Chrome advertisement by London advertising agency BBH, which tracked the emergence of SB.TV as one among many of the UK's rising youth broadcasters. The SB.TV website subsequently crashed as close to a million people searched "Jamal Edwards." The advert was revealed to be the second most watched video advertisement on YouTube in the UK in 2011.

On 10 April 2012, SB.TV released a video with grime collective Boy Better Know, to celebrate reaching 100 million views across all videos.

In September 2013, Susana Giner, director of the Youth Media Agency told The Independent newspaper there was a marketing term that has been adopted in Edwards' namesake; 'The Jamal Edwards effect', a newly adopted ideology that anything’s possible in the digital age.

In 2013, Edwards became the first YouTuber to release an e-book and interactive game, ‘Self Belief: The Vision', which subsequently became a no.1 best seller with demand leading to an unintended print version via Virgin Books. Edwards worked with Burberry as part of Creative Lives, fronted a Puma campaign, presented at the BAFTA Children’s Awards, and delivered talks for Cannes Lions, TedXHollywood, and TedXHousesOfParliament. In a nod to his grandparents, he received a St Vincent Business Award in 2013.

Edwards was honoured when he became one of the Queen’s Young Leaders, after being called upon to run the first ever social media hub at Buckingham Palace. Achievements like this saw Jamal placed at no. 2 in The Guardian’s top 30 young people in digital media 2014.

In 2014, Edwards was invited to collaborate with American Freshman on a headwear range for Topman. The snapbacks and bucket hats went on sale in the summer.

Edwards co-founded UGOT, a yogurt, juice and health bar chain with entrepreneur Jo Carnell.

In December 2014, Edwards was appointed a MBE for his services to music.

In January 2016, SBTV announced the launch of SBTV News, an online news service, in partnership with the Press Association, chaired by former EMAP, Hearst, Axel Springer and Future CEO Colin Morrison.

== Services ==
SBTV is built on three core services: broadcasting, production, and editorial services.

=== Broadcasting ===
SBTV broadcasts video whether for music, freestyle, acoustic, interviews or any other categories within youth culture. All of the company's content is displayed on their YouTube channel. This content is mainly produced by SBTV but they do allow submissions as well. The company also uses social networking extensively to interact with viewers through which new blog and news articles are published.

=== Production ===
In addition to broadcasting, SBTV has also produced original content for its station. Most of the content is described to be shot in "fast and agile situations," which is said to deliver an enticing perspective for the viewer. SBTV produces many types of productions, which are mainly music videos, documentaries, and promotional material.

=== Editorial ===
The majority of employees at SBTV have experience in various printed urban publications and therefore know how to present material to a younger audience. This includes providing the latest news on music releases, films, music videos and artists.

== See also ==
- Link Up TV
- Mixtape Madness
- GRM Daily
