= Back to Square One (mixtape) =

Mixtape by Digga D
- Released: 25 August 2023
- Genre: British hip hop
- Length: 39:12
- Label: Black Money; EGA
- Producer: Aaron Goedluck; Chucks; F1ncha; GX; HARGO; Joe Stanley; Jon Cass; JordonLoud; M1OnTheBeat; P YouGotThat; Quincy Tellem; R14 Beats; Sw8vy; X10; Yoni

Digga D chronology
Noughty by Nature (2022)	Back to Square One (2023)

Singles from Back to Square One
- 1. "Energy" Released: 9 March 2023; 2. "DTF" Released: 15 June 2023; 3. "I'm From..." Released: 29 June 2023; 4. "Facade" Released: 10 August 2023; 5. "Kindness for Weakness" Released: 24 August 2023

Back to Square One is the fourth commercial mixtape by British rapper Digga D. It was released on 25 August 2023 by his record label Black Money Records. It features guest appearances from Potter Payper and M Huncho.

== Background ==
On 1 September 2022, Digga D announced the launching of his own record label Black Money Records (BMR). Back to Square One is the first full-length release on the label. Digga D spoke to The Guardian about the shifting his sound away from UK drill on this project, saying "It's more money, more problems. People are getting older, the fans are changing, people like different types of music now. I don't feel like drill is for me any more. I'm still learning about Auto-Tune, how to project my voice, how to make people feel different feelings. I'm still learning that I can talk normally on a song, and I don't always have to sing. The intro is just me talking – it sounds like poetry."

== Singles and promotion ==
On 9 March 2023, Digga D released the single “Energy”. The single peaked at number 15 on the UK Singles Chart. On 27 April, he released the remix featuring American rapper Latto. On 15 June, the second single "DTF" was released with an accompanying music video. The third single "I'm From..." was released on 29 June. Digga D announced the release date of the mixtape and tracklist, and put out the fourth single "Facade" featuring Potter Payper on 10 August. The fifth music video "Kindness For Weakness" was revealed the day before the mixtape was released.

== Critical reception ==
Professional ratings
Review scores
Source	Rating
Clash	7/10

The Guardian said the majority of the mixtape focuses "on storytelling or cleave to the pained, Auto-Tuned trapwave subgenre – for Digga, this stylistic breadth is a sign of artistic maturity. His lyrics have broadened into new preoccupations: fame, riches, complicated relationships and mouths to feed." GRM Daily said the mixtape "is both a heartfelt ode to his roots and a sincere portrayal of evolution and growth. It’s fair to say that the notorious young star has had a tumultuous past and, with this project, he paints a picture of the crossroads that he has reached, torn between maturity and introspection, and his reckless, hot-headed youth. But despite his chequered past, he has become a pioneer in UK drill. As he settles into his early 20s, Digga is building a book of wisdom with lessons learnt from all corners of his colourful life; Back To Square One is a chapter of this coming-of-age story as it unfolds."

== Track listing ==
Back to Square One track listing
No.	Title	Writer(s)	Producer(s)	Length
1.	"Fighting For My Soul"	Rhys Herbert	Joe Stanley; GX	3:01
2.	"Me & Kinz"	Herbert	GX	1:54
3.	"I'm From..."	Herbert	Aaron Goedluck; R14 Beats; Joe Stanley	3:11
4.	"Soft Life"	Herbert	GX	2:41
5.	"Facade" (with Potter Payper)	Herbert; Jamel Bousbaa	F1ncha; Jon Cass	3:21
6.	"Energy"	Herbert	X10; Hargo	2:56
7.	"Braids"	Herbert	GX	1:38
8.	"Baby Mums Crib" (with M Huncho)	Herbert; M Huncho	Quincy Tellem	3:02
9.	"DTF"	Herbert	Chucks	2:18
10.	"Fuck Drill"	Herbert		2:26
11.	"Bine On 'Em"	Herbert		3:14
12.	"Kindness for Weakness"	Herbert	M1OnTheBeat	2:39
13.	"Burn Bridges"	Herbert	P YouGotThat; Sw8vy	1:50
14.	"Cherish God More"	Herbert	Itchy	2:30
15.	"West To North West"	Herbert	Yoni	2:22
Total length:				39:12

Back to Square One (Bluwuu Edition)
No.	Title	Producer(s)	Length
16.	"Bluwuu 2" (with Sav’o, Ty, Rack5, Horrid1, MSkum, Dodgy & ZK)	Madara; Ace Beatz	4:28
Total length:			43:44

== Charts ==
Chart performance for Back to Square One
Chart (2023)	Peak position
Scottish Albums (OCC)	37
UK Albums (OCC)	6
UK R&B Albums (OCC)	2
