= Ryan Tricks =

English mind reader, magician (born 1991)

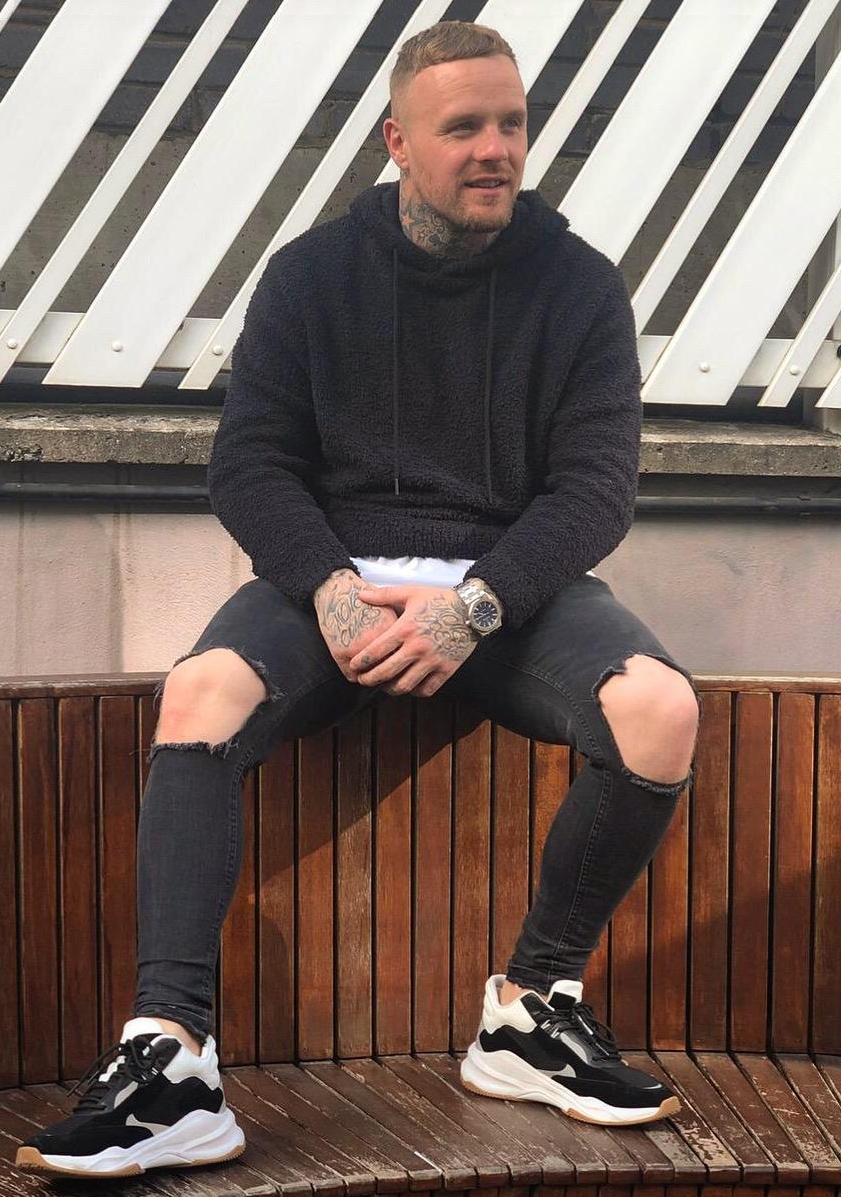
- Tricks in 2018
- Born: Ryan Hicks; 29 May 1991 (age 35); Slough, Berkshire, England
- Occupations: Mind reader; magician
- Years active: 2013–present
- Children: 2
- Website: ryantricks.com

Ryan Hicks (born 29 May 1991), best known by his stage name Ryan Tricks, is an English mind reader and magician. Ryan presents and stars in the BBC Three (online) series of Ryan Tricks On The Streets (aired November 2018) and Dirty Tricks produced by Vice Media on Channel 5 (first aired 23 January 2019).

== Early life ==
Ryan was born on 29 May 1991 at Wexham Park Hospital in Slough, Berkshire. Ryan first was inspired to do magic when his mother (Julie) bought him a magic kit for Christmas when he was eight years old. At the age of 15, Ryan's mother passed away. He has said that she was his main inspiration for becoming involved in magic.

== Career ==
Ryan was first brought to the public's attention in 2013 with appearance on Britain's Got Talent where despite getting through to the next round with three 'yeses', he was dropped before the live shows. Between 2013 and 2018 Ryan moved to the online platform YouTube where he began to make his own style of videos which showed him giving back to the homeless and others in the community. This led to multiple videos going viral including one where he turned pennies into pounds for a homeless man. This did not go unnoticed. This is when BBC Three (online) commissioned a six part miniseries in which Ryan gave back to the community using his magic.

== Works ==
=== Television series ===
==== Series 1 ====
Air Date(s)	Episode	Title	Length (minutes)	Broadcaster
4 November 2018	Episode 1	Gift For Helping The Homeless	5:52	BBC Three (online)
4 November 2018	Episode 2	Magic In The Garden	5:49	BBC Three (online)
4 November 2018	Episode 3	Help To Stay Out Of Trouble	7:26	BBC Three (online)
4 November 2018	Episode 4	Army Connections And Heroes	6:59	BBC Three (online)
4 November 2018	Episode 5	Therapy For The Mind	6:16	BBC Three (online)
4 November 2018	Episode 6	A Special Kind Of Magic For Mums	6:54	BBC Three (online)

==== Series 1 ====
Air Date(s)	Episode	Title	Length (minutes)	Broadcaster
23 January 2019	Episode 1	Carnival	1 hour	5Star
30 January 2019	Episode 2	Night Out	1 hour	5Star
6 February 2019	Episode 3	Brighton Beach	1 hour	5Star
13 February 2019	Episode 4	Date Night	1 hour	5Star
20 February 2019	Episode 5	Football	1 hour	5Star
27 February 2019	Episode 6	Freshers	1 hour	5Star

=== Media Appearances ===
==== Britain's Got Talent (series 7) ====
Ryan performed a controversial effect in his audition in the seventh series of Britain's Got Talent as he is seen to have Alesha Dixon play Russian roulette with a staple gun against his own head.

==== Link Up TV - The Showroom ====
Ryan starred in the first episode of 'The Showroom', a brand new online lifestyle and entertainment program devised by Link Up TV

=== Social media ===
RyanTricksTV is Ryan Tricks YouTube channel which has racked up over 100,000 subscribers and millions of views from self produced magic videos.

=== Private Appearances ===
Ryan has performed for multiple high-profile celebrities including world champion boxer Floyd Mayweather Jr., movie star and comedian Kevin Hart, YouTube celebrities Joe Sugg and KSI and dozens of music artists including Post Malone, Marshmello and Paloma Faith. Ryan has given private talks with magic for large companies including Facebook and Thames Water.
