= Barking (song) =

Single by Ramz
- Released: 1 December 2017
- Recorded: 2017
- Genre: Afroswing
- Length: 3:23
- Label: Polydor
- Songwriter: Ramone Rochester
- Producers: Mokuba Lives; Ramz; Nicky J

Ramz singles chronology
"Barking" (2017)	"Decline (Remix)" (2018)

"Barking" is a 2017 song by British rapper Ramz. It was released on 1 December 2017 as his debut single. The song entered the UK Singles Chart on 14 December 2017 at number 41, before peaking at number two on 19 January 2018.

A promotional music video, filmed around Waterloo, London and Barking, London, was uploaded to GRM Daily's YouTube channel on 17 September 2017.

== Track listing ==
Digital download
No.	Title	Length
1.	"Barking"	3:23

Digital download – #BarkingChallenge
No.	Title	Length
1.	"Barking (#BarkingChallenge)"	1:30

== Charts ==
=== Weekly charts ===
Chart (2017–19)	Peak position
Austria (Ö3 Austria Top 40)	38
Denmark (Tracklisten)	25
Germany (GfK)	4
Ireland (IRMA)	8
Italy (FIMI)	39
Portugal (AFP)	27
Sweden (Sverigetopplistan)	65
Scotland Singles (Official Charts)	16
Switzerland (Schweizer Hitparade)	54
UK Singles (Official Charts)	2
UK Hip Hop/R&B (Official Charts)	2

=== Year-end charts ===
Chart (2018)	Position
Denmark (Tracklisten)	92
Germany (Official German Charts)	30
UK Singles (Official Charts Company)	29

== Certifications ==
Region	Certification	Certified units/sales
Denmark (IFPI Danmark)	Platinum	90,000^{‡}
France (SNEP)	Gold	100,000^{‡}
Germany (BVMI)	Platinum	400,000^{‡}
Italy (FIMI)	Platinum	50,000^{‡}
Poland (ZPAV)	Gold	25,000^{‡}
Portugal (AFP)	Platinum	10,000^{‡}
United Kingdom (BPI)	3× Platinum	1,800,000^{‡}
^{‡} Sales+streaming figures based on certification alone.
