= Digga D =

British rapper (born 2000)

- Born: Rhys Angelo Emile Herbert; 29 June 2000 (age 26); London, England
- Genres: British hip hop; UK drill
- Occupations: Rapper; songwriter; director
- Years active: 2015–present
- Labels: Black Money; Groundworks; CGM
- Member of: CGM
- Website: diggad.co.uk

Rhys Angelo Emile Herbert (born 29 June 2000), known professionally as Digga D or just Digga, is an English rapper. He rose to fame in 2017 along with his UK drill collective CGM (Cherish God More). His mixtapes Double Tap Diaries and Made in the Pyrex reached No. 10 and 3 on the UK Albums Chart, respectively. His third mixtape Noughty by Nature was released on 15 April 2022, debuting at number one on the UK Albums Chart. His fourth mixtape Back to Square One was released in August 2023.

Herbert, originally from Mozart Estate, Queens Park, moved to Ladbroke Grove, where he grew up. Considered to be one of the pioneers of the UK drill scene, he is the founder of his current record label, Black Money Records (BMR) and managed by Groundworks.

Some of Herbert's music videos have garnered attention among law enforcement, resulting in a criminal behaviour order (CBO) taken against him, and he has been in and out of prison during the singles and videos' releases. He was sent to prison three times before the age of 20.

In January 2025, Herbert was sentenced to 3 years and 11 months in prison for the importation and supply of cannabis. His custodial sentence ended in October 2025, including time served awaiting trial, but details of his licence conditions are unknown. He subsequently resumed his music career with November 2025 single "DPMO", which charted in the UK top 40.

== Early life ==
Herbert was born on 29 June 2000, in Ladbroke Grove, to a father of Barbadian descent and a mother of Jamaican descent. In a 2026 interview, Herbert stated that he is part Pakistani through his father. He visited Jamaica frequently throughout his childhood, and during his teenage years he stayed in the Cockburn Pen neighborhood with family members. Herbert's interest in music initially started at age 12 when he listened to Jamaican reggae and dancehall and subsequently started writing music.

Herbert started his education at St Thomas' CE Primary school on Appleford road. Herbert made his first song in 2011 at the Harrow Club alongside future 1011 associates M'Skum and Sav'O. During his years at secondary school, Rhys attended Ranelagh School for a year due to family issues at home. After a year, he went back to his old school. Shortly after, Herbert was excluded from Chelsea Academy secondary school for possession of cannabis by the Deputy Head and ended up not taking his GCSEs.

== Career ==
=== 2015–2017: Formation of 1011/CGM ===
In 2015, Herbert formed the UK drill group 1011 along with his friends in a local youth club in Ladbroke Grove. The group was named after the W10 and W11 postal codes, and includes members Herbert (Digga D), Yonas Girma, Micah Bedeau (Horrid1), Isaac Marshall, and Jordan Bedeau. They released several singles in 2016–17, including "Kill Confirmed", "Play for the Pagans", and "No Hook".

On 9 November 2017, 1011 were arrested in a stop and search in which they were carrying machetes and baseball bats. 1011 claimed they were making a drill music video, but police stated they were planning to attack a rival gang, 12World. 1011 were convicted of conspiracy to commit violent disorder, sentenced to 1 year in jail, and given a Criminal Behaviour Order (CBO) in 2018. Four of the group's music videos prior to the CBO were taken down. However, they were noted to have already amassed over ten million combined views, and would soon be uploaded by fans to their channels, where they continued to get more views. The group rebranded as CGM, an acronym for Certified Grove Members.

=== 2017–2021: Double Tap Diaries and Made in the Pyrex ===
Herbert did a freestyle for Mixtape Madness's Next Up?, which was released on 30 November 2017. The freestyle was certified silver by the British Phonographic Industry on 18 October 2019, making it the first Mixtape Madness freestyle with a certification. Rap critic Joseph JP Patterson described the release of the freestyle as having "stopped everyone in their tracks. Heads in the music industry began to turn, and they quickly found themselves in 'next to blow' conversations." Ethan Herlock of The Face wrote that the freestyle "demonstrated Digga D's distinctive flow and chest-puffing energy, heralding him as a standout MC in the increasingly crowded UK drill scene".

Herbert released post-CBO-reviewed singles including "No Porkies", and "Who?", and had a Mixtape Madness Mad About Bars session with Kenny Allstar. On 17 May 2019, his debut mixtape, Double Tap Diaries was released. The album included the single "No Diet" which peaked No. 20 in the UK Singles Chart. Days after the mixtape release, he confirmed he was still in jail. The corresponding music video garnered 1.6 million views in five days, received a shout-out from rapper Stormzy, and the music was used in an Instagram video post by Zac Efron.

In July 2020, Herbert released the single "Woi", which gained widespread recognition worldwide. The single was nominated for "Song of the Year" at the MOBO Awards, and the editors at Complex listed it at the top of their list of best songs of 2020. In October 2020, the follow-up single was released titled "Chingy (It's Whatever)". On 24 November, BBC Three released the documentary Defending Digga D on BBC iPlayer, and had it later broadcast on BBC One on 27 November. On 4 December, his "Daily Duppy" was released on GRM Daily.

On 4 February 2021, the single "Bringing It Back" with AJ Tracey was released. The song topped the UK Chart's Official Trending Chart and debuted at No. 5 on the UK Singles Chart. On 14 February, the single "Toxic" was released, accompanied by the music video. On 25 February, the music video for the single "Bluuwuu" was released. Herbert's second mixtape, Made in the Pyrex, was released on 26 February 2021. Pyrex reached No. 3 on the UK Albums Chart and was noted for being the "highest charting project to date for a millennium-born UK rapper, and the highest-charting independent UK Drill project on the Official Chart so far."

=== 2021–present: Noughty by Nature and Back to Square One ===
On 13 August 2021, Herbert released the single "Wasted" featuring ArrDee. The single peaked at number 6 on the UK Singles Chart. On 9 September, he released the song "2K17", which charted at number 26 on the UK Singles Chart. He also appeared on the single "Keep Talkin" with Sav'O and Horrid1 on 28 September. On 21 October, he released the single "Red Light Green Light", with the music video referencing the television series Squid Game. The single charted at number 17 on the UK Singles Chart.

Herbert's third mixtape, Noughty by Nature was released on 15 April 2022, including features from Rack5, Dodgy, Horrid1, Hotboii, AJ Tracey, Maverick Sabre, among others. The mixtape debuted atop the UK Albums Chart, becoming Digga D's first number one album. In July 2022, Digga D released two singles, "STFU" and "Frenches" with French rapper Timal. On 1 September, he appeared on the song "Goofies" with American rapper Babyface Ray. The same day, he announced the launching of his own record label Black Money Records (BMR). On 13 October, he released his first single on the new record label, "Stay Inside". On 17 November, he released the single "Chief Rhys Freestyle", which samples the song "Faneto" by Chief Keef.

On 16 February 2023, Herbert appeared on the remix to "Us Against The World" by Strandz, which reached number 10 on the UK Songs Chart. On 9 March, he released the single "Energy". The song debuted at number 19 on the UK Songs Chart. On 27 April, he released the remix featuring American rapper Latto. On 15 June, the second single "DTF" was released with an accompanying music video. The third single "I'm From..." was released on 29 June. He announced the release date of the mixtape and tracklist, and put out the fourth single "Facade" featuring Potter Payper on 10 August.

Herbert released his fourth mixtape, Back to Square One on 25 August 2023, featuring guest appearances from Potter Payper and M Huncho.

== Artistry ==
Herbert's musical influences come from the British Caribbean community in West London and incorporates dancehall, bashment and rap in his style. The Face considered him as one of the pioneers of the UK drill scene. GQ called Digga D "the most influential British rapper of our time," noting his ability to continue rapping about the "harsh, competitive realities of young inner-city life" while also abiding by the rules of his CBO. He said in the interview "I wouldn't say I'm a pioneer of drill; I would say I'm a pioneer of changing drill. Other people made drill, I just took it to a place it's never been to before."

== Legal issues ==
=== Criminal behaviour order ===
Because of their arrest on 9 November 2017, Herbert and 1011 were given a criminal behaviour order (CBO) in 2018 that required the group to have the Metropolitan Police's permission before releasing any new music, forbade them from using London postcodes, and banning references in lyrics to real-life incidents and people. Four of the group's music videos prior to the CBO were taken down. However, they were noted to have amassed over ten million combined views before removal.

The conditions of Herbert's CBO included being fitted with a GPS tracker on his leg and being made to check in with probation every three hours, as well as having to notify the Met police when he uploaded any songs or videos, within 24 hours of upload. Any releases that incited violence, mentioned certain areas of London or lyrical references to real-life incidents or people in their music would not be permitted. "There's a list of about 18 to 20 people that Rhys isn't allowed to associate with, most of whom make up his friends from school or friends from his area or people that the police deemed were part of a gang that he was part of", explained Digga's lawyer, Cecilia Goodwin. Moreover, visually, there are certain things which are not allowed to be portrayed. Any breach of the CBO would result in a recall to prison.

The CBO ban issued to 1011 was condemned by the campaign group Index on Censorship and widely described as entirely unprecedented. Digga's lawyer noted that the CBO "gives the police and probation the ability to control and censor his art". The Metropolitan Police has since denied it was censorship. Det Ch Supt Kevin Southworth said at the time: "When in this instance you see a particular genre of music being used specifically to goad, to incite, to provoke, to inflame, that can only lead to acts of very serious violence being committed, that’s when it becomes a matter for the police. We're not in the business of killing anyone's fun, we're not in the business of killing anyone's artistic expression – we are in the business of stopping people being killed."

While Herbert was recalled to prison in 2019 for breaching the conditions of his CBO, Digga was stabbed in the eye, nearly causing him to lose use of the eye. He was stabbed with a blade fashioned from a tuna can, according to an official at the Ministry of Justice who was not authorized to publicly discuss the matter and who spoke on the condition of anonymity. Goodwin, his lawyer, said that the rapper had been struggling with post-traumatic stress disorder after the attack.

In March 2020, Herbert pleaded guilty to violent disorder again and breaches of his CBO. He was sentenced to two years and 6 months for his role in a machete brawl with rival gang members in front of shoppers in West London. Other members of CGM were also charged, including Sav'o, who was sentenced to three years imprisonment after pleading guilty to violent disorder, possession of an offensive weapon and breaches of a CBO.

=== 2020: London arrest ===
Herbert was arrested again in July for inciting violence after attending a Black Lives Matter protest in London and posting about the movement on Instagram. Right after being released from his previous arrest, rumours circulated that police had taken the rapper back into custody, which was later confirmed. "Again they are on me", the rapper is heard saying in a video as he is being cuffed. "For what? No reason." He has since been released, still under conditions of his CBO. Asked in an interview with The Face if he was treated unfairly, he replied: "Oh, of course, 100 per cent, They didn't ban me from music [at first], only as it started hitting millions and [they] saw me prospering from it."

=== 2024: Home raid and arrest ===
During the early morning of 21 February 2024, Herbert's home in Bracebridge Heath near Lincoln was raided by the Metropolitan Police as he recorded an Instagram Live. He could be seen shouting at the officers and asking what they were doing. When Digga D was asked to leave the house with his hands up, the livestream ended. He was then arrested for suspicion of selling drugs. He was later charged with the supply and importation of cannabis.

Herbert appeared at Lincoln Crown Court via video link from HMP Wormwood Scrubs, where he was remanded in custody. On 29 May 2024, he pleaded guilty to a charge of smuggling cannabis relating to 11 July 2023. He also admitted supplying cannabis between 26 October 2022 and 21 February 2024. As he pleaded not guilty to a charge of being commercially involved with 60 kilograms of cannabis, the issue went to a Newton hearing in December 2024, and on 31 January 2025 he was sentenced to 3 years and 11 months in prison for supplying 45 kilograms of cannabis. According to his social media accounts, he was released from HMP Brixton on 6 October 2025 but details about his licence conditions were not disclosed.

== Discography ==
=== Mixtapes ===
Title	Details	Peak chart positions					Certifications
Title	Details	UK	UK R&B	AUS	IRE	SCO	Certifications
Double Tap Diaries	Released: 17 May 2019; Label: CGM; Format: Digital download, streaming	11	5	—	85	—	
Made in the Pyrex	Released: 26 February 2021; Label: CGM; Format: CD, digital download, streaming	3	1	90	10	19	BPI: Gold
Noughty by Nature	Released: 15 April 2022; Label: CGM, EGA; Format: CD, LP, cassette, digital download, streaming	1	1	—	17	1	BPI: Gold
Back to Square One	Released: 25 August 2023; Label: Black Money Records, EGA; Format: CD, LP, cassette, digital download, streaming	6	2	—	—	37	

=== Singles ===
==== As lead artist ====
Title	Year	Peak chart positions				Certifications	Album
Title	Year	UK	UK R&B	IRE	NZ Hot	Certifications	Album
"Kill Confirmed" (with 1011 & Sav'o)	2017	—	—	—	—		Non-album singles
"Play for the Pagans" (with 1011, Sav'o & Horrid1)	2017	—	—	—	—		Non-album singles
"No Hook" (with 1011, (CGM) ZK, MSkum, Sav'o & Horrid1)	2017	—	—	—	—		Non-album singles
"No Porkies" (with Sav'o & (CGM) ZK)	2018	—	—	—	—		Non-album singles
"Who?" (with Sav'o)	2019	—	—	—	—	BPI: Silver	Non-album singles
"No Diet"	2019	20	8	95	—	BPI: Gold	Double Tap Diaries
"P4DP"	2019	54	27	—	—		Double Tap Diaries
"Mr. Sheeen" (with Russ Millions)	2019	28	14	—	—		Non-album single
"Woi"	2020	24	14	72	—	BPI: Gold	Made in the Pyrex
"Chingy (It's Whatever)"	2020	18	11	50	—	BPI: Silver	Made in the Pyrex
"Gotcha" (with Unknown T and Vybz Kartel featuring Sean D)	2020	—	—	—	—		Non-album single
"Daily Duppy"	2020	59	15	—	—		Non-album single
"Bringing It Back" (with AJ Tracey)	2021	5	3	23	14	BPI: Silver	Made in the Pyrex
"Toxic"	2021	35	20	92	—	BPI: Silver	Made in the Pyrex
"Bluuwuu"	2021	23	12	48	—		Made in the Pyrex
"Wasted" (featuring ArrDee)	2021	6	1	26	—	BPI: Platinum	Noughty by Nature
"2k17"	2021	26	12	74	—	BPI: Silver	Noughty by Nature
"Keep Talkin" (with Horrid1 & Sav'o)	2021	—	—	—	—		Violent Siblings
"Red Light Green Light"	2021	17	3	43	—		Noughty by Nature
"Pump 101" (with Still Brickin')	2022	9	3	33	—	BPI: Gold	Noughty by Nature
"G Lock" (with Moneybagg Yo)	2022	48	25	—	—		Noughty by Nature
"What You Reckon" (with B-Lovee)	2022	46	—	—	—		Noughty by Nature
"Hold It Down"	2022	35	14	85	—		Noughty by Nature
"Main Road"	2022	72	38	—	—		Noughty by Nature
"STFU"	2022	64	20	—	—		Non-album singles
"Frenches" (with Timal)	2022	—	—	—	—		Non-album singles
"Stay Inside"	2022	88	—	—	—		Non-album singles
"Chief Rhys Freestyle"	2022	—	—	—	—		Non-album singles
"Energy"	2023	15	9	40	—	BPI: Silver; RMNZ: Gold	Back to Square One
"DTF"	2023	83	—	—	—		Back to Square One
"I'm From..."	2023	—	—	—	—		Back to Square One
"Facade" (featuring Potter Payper)	2023	55	24	—	—		Back to Square One
"Hide and Seek" (with 163Margs)	2023	38	19	—	—		Non-album singles
"TLC"	2023	60	—	—	—		Non-album singles
"Adolescence" (with Unknown T)	2023	90	—	—	—		Non-album singles
"DPMO"	2025	31	9	—	—		TBA
"Nonchalant" (with Horrid1)	2025	—	24	—	—		TBA
"Girls All Around the World"	2026	61	—	—	—		TBA
"—" denotes a single that did not chart or was not released.

==== As featured artist ====
Title	Year	Peak chart positions	Certifications	Album
Title	Year	UK	Certifications	Album
"Gun Lean (Remix)" (Russ Millions featuring Taze, LD, Digga D, Ms Banks & Lethal Bizzle)	2019	—		Non-album singles
"10+1" (CGM featuring Splasha, MSkum, (CGM) Striker, Dodgy, Rack5, (CGM) TY, Horrid1, Sav'o & Digga D)	2019	—		Non-album singles
"Gotcha" (Sean D featuring Digga D, Vybz Kartel & Unknown T)	2020	—		Non-album singles
"Be the One" (Rudimental featuring MORGAN, Digga D & TIKE)	2020	49	BPI: Silver	Non-album singles
"Packs and Potions (Remix)" (HAZEY featuring M1llionz, Digga D & Unknown T)	2022	—		Non-album singles
"Goofies" (Babyface Ray featuring Digga D)	2022	—		Non-album singles
"Laughing Stock (Remix)" (Kay-O featuring Digga D & Kwengface)	2022	—		Non-album singles
“Quincy Promes” (Kwengface featuring Digga D, Booter Bee & PS Hitsquad)	2024			

=== Promotional singles ===
Title	Year	Peak chart positions	Certifications	Album
Title	Year	UK	Certifications	Album
"Next Up?" (with 1011, Sav'O & (CGM) TY)	2017	—	BPI: Gold (Note: The single was listed as "Next Up? – Pt 1" by Mixtape Madness ft. 1011)	Non-album singles
"Mad About Bars" (with Kenny Allstar)	2018	—		Non-album singles
"Mad About Bars Pt. 2" (with CGM, Kenny Allstar)	2019	—		Non-album singles
"Daily Duppy - Pt. 1"	2020	59	BPI: Silver	Non-album singles
"A Lil Promo (Freestyle)"	2022	—		Noughty by Nature
"Life of a Real G (Freestyle)"	2022	—		Noughty by Nature
"On the Radar (Freestyle)"	2022	—		Noughty by Nature
"Amelia Amelia"	2022	—		Noughty by Nature

=== Guest appearances ===
List of non-single guest appearances, with other performing artists, showing year released and album name
Title	Year	Other artist(s)	Album
"Rolling"	2019	—N/a	Rapman Presents: Blue Story (Music Inspired By the Original Motion Picture)
"Get in That Jeep"	2021	Aystar	Scousematic 3
"Glee"	2021	Unknown T	Adolescence
"Take That"	2021	Potter Payper	Thanks for Waiting
"Bine"	2022	Horrid1 & Sav'o	Violent Siblings
"Went Jail"	2022	Groundworks, Unknown T	The G Tape: Volume 1
"5/11"	2022	Trapx10	Project X10
"Bad & Clean (Remix)"	2022	Frisco, INFAMOUSIZAK, Skillibeng, Skepta	—N/a

== Filmography ==
=== Film ===
Year	Title	Role	Notes
2020	Defending Digga D	Himself	BBC documentary
2023	11 Steps Forward, 10 Steps Back	Himself	Documentary

=== Television ===
Year	Title	Role	Notes
2024	Supacell	Chucky	2 episodes

== Awards and nominations ==
Year	Event	Prize	Recipient	Result	Ref
2021	Grierson Awards	Envy Best Single Documentary – Domestic	Defending Digga D	Nominated	
2021	Grierson Awards	Music & Single Documentary – Domestic	Defending Digga D	Nominated	
2021	RTS Southern Awards	Documentary or Factual Programme	Defending Digga D	Nominated	
2022	Broadcast Awards	Best Multichannel Programme	Defending Digga D	Won	
