= Ramz (rapper) =

- Born: Ramone Rochester; 18 February 1997 (age 29); Mitcham, London, England
- Genres: British hip hop; afroswing
- Occupations: Rapper; singer; songwriter
- Years active: 2017–present
- Label: Polydor

Ramone Rochester (born 18 February 1997), known professionally as Ramz, is a British rapper and singer and songwriter from London. He is best known for his hit single "Barking", which peaked at number two on the UK Singles Chart in January 2018.

== Early life ==
Rochester was born 18 February 1997 in Mitcham, South London. He attended St Mark's Academy, where he was excluded several times in secondary school, and then attended Harris Academy Merton sixth form. Rochester eventually went to study Sports Development at the University of Portsmouth before dropping out the same year to focus on music. He is also an avid supporter of Arsenal F.C.

== Career ==
Rochester released his first song "I'm On My Grind" in February 2017 to little notice. He further released several other tracks in March 2017 and July 2017. Whilst releasing music, Rochester was attempting to find employment after leaving university, eventually finding a job working at supermarket chain Sainsbury's.

In September 2017, Rochester formally released "Barking" alongside a music video. The song entered the UK Singles Chart on 14 December 2017 at number 41, before peaking at number two on 19 January 2018.

In July 2019 Ramz received help after posting the word "suicide" on Instagram.

== Personal life ==
Ramz was in an on-again off-again relationship with London-based R&B musician Mnelia, which began in 2016 when the pair met at Portsmouth University. Their son (whose name and face they conceal), was born in 2020. The couple separated indefinitely late 2021.

== Discography ==
=== Extended plays ===
Title	Details
Two Sides of a Coin	Released: 15 June 2018; Label: Polydor Records; Format: Digital download
Blockbuster	Released: 17 May 2019; Label: Polydor Records; Format: Digital download

=== Singles ===
Title	Year	Peak chart positions										Certifications	Album
Title	Year	UK	UK R&B	IRE	AUT	DEN	GER	POR	SWE	SCO	SWI	Certifications	Album
"Barking"	2017	2	2	8	38	25	4	27	65	16	54	BPI: 3× Platinum; BVMI: Platinum	Blockbuster
"Power"	2018	—	—	—	—	—	—	—	—	—	—		Non-album single
"Family Tree"	2018	35	17	—	—	—	—	—	—	—	—	BPI: Gold	Blockbuster
"Movin'" (with Zion B)	2018	—	—	—	—	—	—	—	—	—	—		Non-album single
"Hold You Down"	2019	95	—	—	—	—	—	—	—	—	—	BPI: Silver	Blockbuster
"Sunday"	2019	—	—	—	—	—	—	—	—	—	—		Blockbuster
"Think Twice About Suicide"	2019	—	—	—	—	—	—	—	—	—	—		Non-album single
"—" denotes single did not chart or was not released in that territory.

=== Guest appearances ===
Title	Year	Other artist(s)	Album
"Decline" (Remix)	2017	Raye	Non-album remix
