= Manslaughter of Joanne Rand =

2017 acid throwing incident in England

Joanne Rand (1969/70 – 14 June 2017) was a 47-year-old mother-of-three from Marlow in the English county of Buckinghamshire, who died several days after becoming the victim of an acid attack on 3 June 2017. Rand was sitting on a bench when she was sprayed with high strength sulphuric acid during a fight between Xeneral Webster, a teenager from East Acton, and another man in High Wycombe. After being treated in hospital for burns, she developed septicaemia, and died from multiple organ failure eleven days later. Webster was subsequently arrested and charged with Rand's murder, but pleaded guilty to manslaughter at his trial in April 2018. In July 2018 he was sentenced to 17 years in prison with an extended licence period of three years after his release. The case is the first instance of a criminal conviction for an acid killing in the United Kingdom.

== Background ==
Joanne Rand, known as Jo, was born in County Durham, and was the youngest of five siblings. She grew up in High Wycombe, Buckinghamshire, and was living in Marlow at the time of her death. She was a mother-of-three, and worked at the Sir Aubrey Ward care home in Marlow, where she cared for dementia patients. She was described by her family as "hard-working and passionate about her job", "very bubbly and fun" and "outgoing". In 2011, her oldest daughter, Charlotte Pitwell, died following a car crash. Charlotte was 19 at the time.

Xeneral Webster was from East Acton in west London. Following his conviction for Joanne Rand's manslaughter, it was reported that he was a member of the 12World gang, a street gang based in Shepherd's Bush involved in the UK drill scene, and that he was known to associates as "The General". He also used the name Imiuru. In February 2020, The Times reported that he had attempted to launch a jihadist-style attack on prison officers at HMP Winchester after being radicalised by other inmates, but that the attack had been thwarted.

== Attack ==
On the afternoon of 3 June 2017, Rand visited Charlotte's grave, then sat on a bench in the town's Frogmoor area. Between 4.30pm and 4.45pm, and as she was smoking a cigarette, a fight broke out nearby, between Xeneral Webster and another man, Saqib Hussain, with whom Webster had been involved in a long-running dispute. Webster, of East Acton, had travelled to High Wycombe from London to meet Hussain, and tried to steal a bicycle from him. Webster produced an open bottle, held it towards the other man's face and said to him "This is acid". Hussain then kicked the bottle from Webster's hand, sending a spray of industrial strength sulphuric acid over Rand, covering her from head to toe. After realising she had been doused with the substance, and beginning to experience pain, she screamed and ran to a local fast food outlet, where she rinsed her face with water. Webster placed a balaclava over his face, retrieved the empty bottle and cycled away, before catching a train back to London. Rand was treated for acid burns at Stoke Mandeville Hospital and discharged. Her family have described how she became afraid to go out in the days following the incident, and did not like people seeing her injuries. She went on to develop septicaemia as a result of her burns, and after being readmitted to hospital, died from multiple organ failure on 14 June, eleven days after the attack.

== Arrest and trial ==
In October 2017, Webster was charged with Rand's murder, and appeared at Amersham Magistrates' Court, where he was remanded in custody. His trial, at Reading Crown Court, began on 12 April 2018, and was expected to last three weeks. The case was prosecuted by Allison Hunter QC and defended by Brendan Kelly QC, while Angela Morris was the presiding judge.

The court heard that Webster, who had previously armed himself with acid, and had also himself been the victim of an acid attack, had travelled to High Wycombe on the afternoon of 3 June to seek out Hussain over a drugs dispute. The jury was shown CCTV footage of him travelling from Central London by train to Gerrards Cross, then on to High Wycombe, arriving there at around 4.00pm, before he sought out Hussain. He was seen to produce a bottle from a satchel he was carrying, with the lid already open. The trial was told that after the bottle was kicked from his hand, Rand, who was sitting around 13 metres from the two men, felt it hit her shin, before her face, arms and feet began to burn. This resulted in her skin receiving 5% burns, and there was also significant damage to her clothing, "with white stains across the front and a number of rips and holes". The hearing heard that a pH test on the substance confirmed a reading of minus two, which Hunter described as "typical of a very strong acid, very corrosive and can cause severe progressive burns to the skin". A statement read to the court on behalf of plastic surgeon Dr Colin Raynor described Rand's injuries as being "particularly to the right side of her face with widespread wounds", suggesting the bottle must have "struck her at considerable force to knock the amount of acid out that had caused this amount of injury".

After initially pleading "not guilty" to murder, Webster pleaded guilty to manslaughter six days into the proceedings. In addition, he pleaded guilty to two charges of possessing an offensive weapon and a charge of affray. On 18 April, the prosecution accepted his manslaughter plea, and Morris directed the jury to acquit him of the charges of murder, robbery and attempted grievous bodily harm. The trial was then adjourned for sentencing.

Speaking after the conviction, Adrian Foster, of the Crown Prosecution Service, explained the reasons for bringing the prosecution: "Joanne Rand was not the intended victim of the attack, but the prosecution was brought on the basis that by producing an open bottle of acid and raising it to the face of another man, Xeneral Webster intended to cause that individual really serious harm. The man fighting with Webster acted reasonably, in the circumstances, by deflecting the bottle away. Webster was responsible for the death of Joanne and had he not planned to hurt the intended victim, Joanne would still be alive today." Detective Chief Inspector Nick Glister of Thames Valley Police, who was the senior investigating officer, said, "Webster showed a total disregard for the innocent members of the public who were present that day and his actions took a much loved mum, sister, and partner away from her many family and friends".

In July 2018, Webster, then aged 19, was sentenced to 17 years in prison, with an extended licence period of three years after that. In her summing up of the case, Judge Morris told Webster "You and your actions bear the responsibility for her [Rand’s] tragic demise". Webster apologised to Rand's family, but shouted abuse at Morris as he was sentenced, then said "All of you will probably be dead by the time I am out of here, fuck you bro" as he was led from the court. The case was the first criminal conviction for an acid killing in the UK.

== Post-trial events ==
Webster subsequently launched an appeal against the conviction, claiming he had been given incorrect legal advice, but this was rejected by the Court of Appeal in July 2020.

In January 2019, it emerged that a previous acid attack, committed outside a cinema in Ealing, west London, in March 2017, had been linked to Webster, and that an officer with the Metropolitan Police was under investigation for not circulating CCTV video of the incident until November 2018, by which time Webster was serving a prison sentence for the manslaughter of Joanne Rand. In June 2020, it was reported that the unnamed officer would face a misconduct hearing.

In April 2019, Webster was charged with the March 2017 acid attack, and with the assault of a prison officer in December 2018. In March 2020, Webster received a life sentence for the assault at HMYOI Aylesbury, and was ordered to serve a minimum term of 14 years. He also admitted the March 2017 acid attack at that hearing, which was held at Oxford Crown Court.

== See also ==
- Corrosive fluid attacks in the United Kingdom
