= EO (rapper) =

British rapper, singer, songwriter and YouTuber

- Also known as: eocrossover
- Born: Edwin Onokhua; 22 June 2001 (age 25); London, England
- Genres: British hip hop; afroswing
- Occupations: Rapper; singer; songwriter; YouTuber
- Instrument: Vocals
- Years active: 2018–present

Edwin Onokhua (born 22 June 2001), known professionally as EO, is a British rapper, singer, songwriter and YouTuber from London. He started as a comedian on his YouTube channel, eocrossover, doing song parodies and comedic skits. His debut single, "German", was released in 2018 after encouragement from fans. It reached No. 13 in the UK Singles Chart, which attracted UKG MC Versatile, who became his manager. Producer JRocs professionally re-recorded the single, and a music video was shot. The track was signed to Columbia Records, who re-released it on download and streaming services. EO was selected as artist of the day by Urban Music Awards on 7 August 2018, and artist of the week by Apple Music in April 2018.

EO also featured on the debut single "Baddest" by Amelia Monét, that reached No. 91 in the UK chart.

== Personal life ==
Onokhua is of Nigerian heritage, a topic he has made comical skits about on his YouTube channel.

It is reported that in the year 2022 and 2023, EO was sectioned under the mental health act as videos of him instead a care facility emerged on social media platforms.

== Discography ==
=== Singles ===
| Title | Year | Peak chart positions | Certifications |
| Title | Year | UK | Certifications |
|---|---|---|---|
| "German" | 2018 | 13 | BPI: Platinum |
| "Tick Tock" | 2018 | - | |
| Next Up? (with Mixtape Madness) | 2018 | - | |
| "Baddest" | 2018 | - | |
| "1Take (Naija to London)" | 2018 | - | |
| "Bend Low" | 2019 | - | |
| "Cold World [Freestyle] | 2019 | - | |
| "Need More" | 2020 | - | |
| "Buss Me A Pound" | 2020 | - | |
| "419" | 2021 | - | |
| "Blood On The Block" | 2022 | - | |
"—" denotes a recording that did not chart or was not released in that territory.
