= B1llionz =

Single by M1llionz
- Released: 9 July 2020
- Recorded: 2020
- Genre: UK drill
- Length: 3:49
- Songwriter(s): Mahalia Burkmar; Miguel Cunningham; Felix Joseph; Bryan Kabengele; Jonny Lattimer; Alastair Joseph O'Donnell; Aston Rudi
- Producer(s): B Kay

M1llionz singles chronology
"Y Pree" (2020)	"B1llionz" (2020)	"Lagga" (2020)

"Billionz" is a song by British rapper M1llionz. It was released as a single on 9 July 2020 and peaked at number 39 on the UK Singles Chart, spending five weeks in the top 100.

== Production ==
M1llionz broke through at the end of 2019 with his song "North-West", and he also released the anthem "Y Pree" at the start of 2020, but B1llionz was the first single to make an impact on the UK charts. The lyrics tell the story of how M1llionz's life has changed since his rapid career rise, and the money that has come along with it. The music video was shot by director Teeeezy C, who had also produced videos for Digga D and Nafe Smallz. The song achieved over 890,000 streams on its first week of release.

== Charts ==
Chart (2020)	Peak position
UK Singles (OCC)	39

== Certifications ==
Certifications for "B1llionz"
Region	Certification	Certified units/sales
United Kingdom (BPI)	Silver	200,000^{‡}
^{‡} Sales+streaming figures based on certification alone.
