= Noughty by Nature =

Mixtape by Digga D
- Released: 15 April 2022
- Recorded: 2020–2022
- Genre: British hip hop; UK drill
- Length: 41:04
- Label: CGM; EGA
- Producer: 4stringz; Aaronorage; AJ Tracey; AoD; AV The Producer; Benji Bandz; Cage Beats; Emrld Beats; Esstwo; DN6; Finn Wigan; Gotcha; Harry Beech; Itchy; Jacob Manson; Jake Gosling; JJ Beats; Kazza; Kieran Nash; Littlevibeats; MacMac Relax; Mason; Mokuba; Nyge; R14 Beats; Sean Murdz; Swidom; The Elements; X10

Digga D chronology
Made in the Pyrex (2021)	Noughty by Nature (2022)	Back to Square One (2023)

Singles from Noughty by Nature
- 1. "Wasted" Released: 13 August 2021; 2. "2k17" Released: 9 September 2021; 3. "Pump 101" Released: 20 January 2022; 4. "G Lock" Released: 3 March 2022; 5. "What You Reckon" Released: 31 March 2022; 6. "Hold It Down" Released: 7 April 2022; 7. "Main Road" Released: 14 April 2022

Noughty by Nature (abbreviated as NBN) is the third commercial mixtape by British rapper Digga D. It was released on 15 April 2022 by CGM. It features guest appearances from Still Brickin', Rack5, Dodgy, Horrid1, AJ Tracey, and Maverick Sabre, and American rappers B-Lovee, Moneybagg Yo, and Hotboii. The extended edition adds a further guest appearance from Arrdee. The mixtape debuted atop the UK Albums Chart, becoming Digga D's first number-one album.

== Background ==
Digga D described this mixtape saying "This is the first time in my life I feel free. Free from all the hassle from police, haters, probation and crazy entanglements. Really been living a movie and this mixtape is just a scene from it."

== Singles and promotion ==
On 13 August 2021, Digga D released the single "Wasted" featuring ArrDee. The single peaked at number 6 on the UK Singles Chart. On 9 September, he released the song "2K17", which charted at number 26 on the UK Singles Chart. He also appeared on the single "Keep Talkin" with Sav'O and Horrid1 on 28 September. On 21 October, he released the single "Red Light Green Light", with the music video referencing the television series Squid Game. The single charted at number 17 on the UK Singles Chart.

On 20 January, Digga D released the single "Pump 101" featuring Still Brickin. On 3 March, he released the single "G Lock" featuring American rapper Moneybagg Yo. He released three freestyles in March titled "A Lil Promo", "Life of a Real G", and a freestyle during an appearance the radio station On the Radar in the United States. On 31 March, Digga D released the third single from the mixtape "What You Reckon", featuring American rapper B-Lovee.

On 7 April, the fourth single was released titled "Hold It Down". On 12 April, he released the song "Amelia Amelia" and revealed the tracklist of the mixtape in the music video. He also released music videos for "Main Road" and "Alter Ego".

== Artwork ==
On 3 March 2022, Digga D announced the mixtape and revealed the artwork with silhouettes of the characters. The characters were revealed in different music videos released to promote the mixtape.

== Critical reception ==
Professional ratings
Review scores
Source	Rating
Clash	9/10
The Guardian	4/5 stars
NME	4/5 stars
Pitchfork	7.2/10

Noughty by Nature was met with widespread critical acclaim from music critics. The Guardian scored the mixtape 4 out of 5 stars and noted the versatility on the mixtape, saying he achieved this under extraordinary circumstances due to a criminal behaviour order that prevents him from rapping about violence. The mixtape contains influence of early 2000's hip hop, with the writer saying "Digga is clearly trying to expand beyond drill to encompass trap and even pop balladry. This is sometimes to the album’s detriment. Its most thrilling moments come when it sticks fast to drill's minimal and now distinctively British blueprint, rather than looking back towards the US."

NME also rated the mixtape a 4 out of 5 stars, claiming it features some of Digga D's best and deepest work, saying "Once upon a time, Digga D's career was riddled with ifs and buts, yet he keeps growing musically, challenging what drill music can be. On Noughty by Nature, he confirms he's a genre juggernaut, but in wearing his heart a little more on his sleeve, he's also evolving right in front of us." Clash gave the mixtape a 9/10, calling Digga D an icon, saying the project "truly shines when he does what he does best. Speedy wordplay against a club-thumping beat is what makes this a memorable mixtape."

=== Year-end lists ===
Select year-end rankings of Noughty by Nature
Publication	List	Rank	Ref.
Complex UK	Complex UK's Best Albums of 2022	16	
The Quietus	The Quietus Albums Of The Year 2022	99	

== Commercial performance ==
In the United Kingdom, Noughty by Nature debuted at number one on the UK Albums Chart, with first-week sales of 8,855 album-equivalent units. The album had the lowest number 1 first week sales since Taylor Swift's December 2020, Evermore.

== Track listing ==
Noughty by Nature track listing
No.	Title	Writer(s)	Producer(s)	Length
1.	"Intro"	Rhys Herbert	Swidom; Kazza	2:02
2.	"Alter Ego"	Herbert	Mokuba	2:13
3.	"Load Up"	Herbert	Aaronorage; R14 Beats	3:14
4.	"Stuck in the Mud"	Herbert	Finn Wigan	1:54
5.	"Pump 101" (with Still Brickin')	Herbert; Still Brickin'	Aaronorage	2:32
6.	"Hold It Down"	Herbert	Cage Beats	2:13
7.	"What You Reckon" (with B-Lovee)	Herbert; Qwayshawn Cannon	Aaronorage; R14 Beats	3:25
8.	"Main Road"	Herbert	Sean Murdz	3:25
9.	"Secret" (with Rack5, Dodgy, and Horrid1)	Herbert; Rack5; Dodgy; Horrid1	Esstwo . DN6 . Banrisk	3:12
10.	"G Lock" (with Moneybagg Yo)	Herbert; DeMario White, Jr.	Nyge; AoD	3:10
11.	"Statement"	Herbert	Aaronorage; Harry Beech; Kieran Nash; 4stringz	1:43
12.	"Addicted"	Herbert	Jake Gosling	1:55
13.	"Attention"	Herbert	Littlevibeats; Mason; JJ Beats	2:15
14.	"Rambo" (with Hotboii)	Herbert; Javarri Walker	Itchy	2:16
15.	"Why" (with AJ Tracey)	Herbert; Ché Grant	The Elements; AJ Tracey	2:34
16.	"Let It Go" (with Maverick Sabre)	Herbert; Michael Stafford	Jake Gosling	2:53
Total length:				41:04

Noughty by Nature (Extended Edition)
No.	Title	Writer(s)	Producer(s)	Length
17.	"Wasted" (with ArrDee)	Herbert; Riley Davies	Jacob Manson; Finn Wigan	2:54
18.	"2K17"	Herbert	X10	3:26
19.	"Red Light Green Light"	Herbert	MacMac Relax; Benji Bandz	2:52
20.	"A Lil Promo (Freestyle)"	Herbert	Emrld Beats	2:02
21.	"Life of a Real G (Freestyle)"	Herbert		2:42
22.	"On the Radar (Freestyle)"	Herbert	Itchy	1:44
23.	"Amelia Amelia"	Herbert	AV the Producer; Gotcha	2:43
Total length:				59:30

== Charts ==
Chart performance for Noughty by Nature
Chart (2022)	Peak position
Irish Albums (OCC)	17
Scottish Albums (OCC)	1
UK Albums (OCC)	1
UK R&B Albums (OCC)	1

== Certifications ==
Certifications for Noughty by Nature
Region	Certification	Certified units/sales
United Kingdom (BPI)	Silver	60,000^{‡}
^{‡} Sales+streaming figures based on certification alone.
