= Pier Pressure (mixtape) =

Mixtape by ArrDee
- Released: 18 March 2022
- Recorded: January 2021; September 2021 – March 2022
- Studio: Island Records
- Genres: British hip-hop; UK drill
- Length: 42:18
- Labels: Island; Universal

Singles from Pier Pressure
- 1. "Body (Remix)" Released: 22 April 2021; 2. "Oliver Twist" Released: 3 June 2021; 3. "Wasted" Released: 12 August 2021; 4. "Wid It" Released: 19 August 2021; 5. "Flowers (Say My Name)" Released: 11 November 2021; 6. "War" Released: 3 February 2022; 7. "Come & Go" Released: 4 March 2022; 8. "Hello Mate" Released: 14 July 2022

Pier Pressure is the debut mixtape by British rapper ArrDee. It was released on 18 March 2022 through Island, peaking at number 2 on the UK Albums Chart. It features guest appearances from Aitch, Lola Young, Russ Millions, Tion Wayne, Bugzy Malone, Fivio Foreign, E1 (3x3), ZT (3x3), Buni, Darkoo and Digga D. The reissue adds appearances from Black Sherif and Kyla.

== Background ==
ArrDee, born Riley Davies, saw success being featured on the remix of Russ Millions and Tion Wayne's song "Body", which topped the charts in various countries including the UK. He then released the single "Oliver Twist", referencing the book by Charles Dickens, which peaked at number six on the UK Singles Chart

== Singles ==
The first official single from Pier Pressure was "Flowers (Say My Name)", which samples the tracks of the same names by Sweet Female Attitude and Destiny's Child respectively. It was released on 11 November 2021 and peaked at number 5 on the UK Singles Chart, spending thirteen weeks in the top 40, seventeen weeks in the top 100, with seven of those weeks being in the chart's top 10.

On 3 February 2022, Davies released the second single, "War", featuring rapper Aitch. "War" debuted at number 6 on the UK Singles Chart on 11 February 2022.

On 4 March 2022, Davies released "Come & Go" as the third single from the mixtape.

== Critical reception ==
Professional ratings
Review scores
Source	Rating
Clash	7/10
The Guardian	3/5 stars
NME	4/5 stars

Pier Pressure was released to generally positive reviews. Clash magazine felt the rapper "cement[ed] his position within UK rap's upper echelons". Sophie Williams, writing for NME felt Pier Pressure was "fresh" and "fierce".

== Promotion ==
In November 2021, Davies announced his first UK tour.

== Track listing ==
Pier Pressure Physical CD track listing
No.	Title	Writer(s)	Producer(s)	Length
1.	"Locker"	Riley Davies; Harry Charles Gough	Hargo	2:46
2.	"War" (with Aitch)	Davies; Harrison Armstrong; Jake Jones; Taras Slusarenko	LiTek; WhyJay	2:46
3.	"Oliver Twist"	Davies; Zel	Zel; Greg Seekers	2:54
4.	"Flowers (Say My Name)"	Davies; Beyonce Knowles; Fred Jerkins; Kelly Rowland; Jake Jones; LaShawn Daniels; Latavia Roberson; Lil Tecca; Martin Leslie Green; Mike Powell; LeToya Luckett; Rodney Jerkins; Taras Slusarenko	Lil Tek; WhyJay	2:38
5.	"No Biggie"	Davies; LiTek; Two Inch Punch	LiTek; Two Inch Punch	3:08
6.	"Early Hours"	Davies; Joseph Boyden; LiTek	Seph Got the Waves; LiTek	2:46
7.	"Late Night Driving"	Davies; Gough	Hargo	3:10
8.	"Fruitella"	Davies; James Maddocks; LiTek; Malita Rice; Yung Lan	Davies; James Maddocks	2:40
9.	"Come & Go"	Davies; Alistair O'Donnell; Alex Sparks; Louis Gibzen; Andreas Carlsson; David Stenmarck; Jacob Manson; Nigel Swanston; Niklas Jarl; Timothy John Cox	AOD; Jacob Manson	2:59
10.	"Pandemic"	Davies; Benny Jones; Jo Jo F	Jo Jo F	3:02
11.	"Who Woulda Thought" (featuring Lola Young)	Davies; Alistair O'Donnell; Jake Jones; Lola Young; Taras Slusarenko	LiTek; WhyJay; AOD	2:49
Total length:				31:45

Streaming standard edition
No.	Title	Writer(s)	Producer(s)	Length
12.	"Body (Remix)" (Tion Wayne and Russ Millions featuring Arrdee, Bugzy Malone, E1 & ZT (3x3), Fivio Foreign, Darkoo, and Buni)	Davies; Aaron Davies; Buni; Darkoo; E1(3x3); Maxie Lee Ryles III; Shylo Batchelor Ashby Milwood; Dennis Junior Odunwo; ZT (3x3)	Gotcha; WhyJay	4:38
13.	"Wasted" (Digga D featuring Arrdee)	Davies; Rhys Herbert	Finn Wigan; Jacob Manson	2:54
14.	"Wid It" (with Tion Wayne)	Davies; Gotcha; Tion Wayne	Gotcha	3:01
Total length:				42:18

Streaming reissue
No.	Title	Writer(s)	Producer(s)	Length
12.	"Come & Go" (Black Sherif Remix)	Davies; Alistair O'Donnell; Alex Sparks; Andreas Carlsson; David Stenmarck; Jacob Manson; Nigel Swanston; Niklas Jarl; Timothy John Cox	AOD; Jacob Manson	3:00
13.	"6am in Brighton"	Davies	Joe Stanley; Cash Paradox; Jesterbeats	3:14
14.	"Cheeky Bars"	Davies	Mason X Beats	3:02
15.	"Body (Remix)" (Tion Wayne and Russ Millions featuring Arrdee, Bugzy Malone, E1 & ZT (3x3), Fivio Foreign, Darkoo, and Buni)	Davies; Aaron Davies; Buni; Darkoo; E1(3x3); Maxie Lee Ryles III; Shylo Batchelor Ashby Milwood; Dennis Junior Odunwo; ZT (3x3)	Gotcha; WhyJay	4:38
16.	"Wasted" (Digga D featuring Arrdee)	Davies; Rhys Herbert	Finn Wigan; Jacob Manson	2:54
17.	"Wid It" (with Tion Wayne)	Davies; Gotcha; Tion Wayne	Gotcha	3:01
18.	"Hello Mate" (featuring Kyla)	Davies; Errol Reid; Corey Johnson; Luke Reid; Kyla Smith; Taras Slusharenko	WhyJay; LiTek	3:13
Total length:				65:20

== Charts ==
=== Weekly charts ===
Weekly chart performance for Pier Pressure
Chart (2022)	Peak position
Australian Albums (ARIA)	20
Irish Albums (Official Charts)	14
New Zealand Albums (RMNZ)	21
Scottish Albums (Official Charts)	5
UK Albums (Official Charts)	2
UK R&B Albums (Official Charts)	1

Weekly chart performance for Pier Pressure
Chart (2023)	Peak position
UK Albums	91

=== Year-end charts ===
Year-end chart performance for Pier Pressure
Chart (2022)	Position
UK Albums (OCC)	44

== Certifications ==
Certifications and sales for Pier Pressure
Region	Certification	Certified units/sales
United Kingdom (BPI)	Gold	100,000^{‡}
^{‡} Sales+streaming figures based on certification alone.

== Release history ==
Release dates and formats for Pier Pressure
Region	Date	Format(s)	Label	Ref.
Various	18 March 2022	Digital download; streaming	Island; Universal	
