= Hove Park School =

Coordinates: 50°50′26.09″N 0°10′44.67″W

Location
- Nevill Road; Hove, East Sussex, BN3 7BN; England

Information
- Type: Community school
- Motto: Together We Achieve
- Religious affiliation: None
- Founder: Brighton & Hove Council
- Closed: No
- Local authority: Brighton and Hove
- Specialist: Language College
- Department for Education URN: 114607 Tables
- Ofsted: Reports
- Chair: Paul Williams
- Head teacher: Jim Roberts
- Gender: Mixed
- Age: 11 to 19
- Enrolment: 1,170 as of March 2023
- Houses: Yes
- Colour: Navy Blue
- Website: www.hovepark.org.uk

Hove Park School is a mixed secondary school and sixth form centre located over two sites in Hove, East Sussex, England.

The school is located over two sites in Hove: The Valley campus educates pupils aged 11 to 13 and 17-19 (academic years 7, 8 and sixth form), while the Nevill campus educates pupils aged 14 to 16 (academic years 9, 10 and 11). The school offers GCSEs, NVQs and A Levels.

In 2002 the school was accredited as a specialist Language College. Although the specialist schools programme has ended Hove Park School continues to specialise in languages, and offers courses in French, German, Spanish and Mandarin, as well as extra-curricular courses in Japanese and Arabic, as well as some more common languages. The school also participates in the European Union funded Interreg IVa programme, which organises regular educational and cultural exchanges with pupils from Europe.

In August 2012, the school was first in Brighton and Hove for Most improved schools, being 2nd in the South East and 12th Nationally. Since then, an increase in their ofsted rating which sees them rise from a "satisfactory" rating to a "good rating", the second highest rating by Ofsted.

Moves by authorities in 2013–14 to convert the school into an academy were opposed by many parents and teachers, campaigning as Hands Off Hove Park. In September 2014, Hove Park's then headteacher Derek Trimmer urged governors to oppose academy status, and the governors voted against the academy proposal.

As of September 2023, the school currently does not accept new sixth form students, as there were too few enrolled students for it to be considered "financially sustainable". The decision will be reviewed again in September 2026.

In 2028, the two school campuses will merge into one, due to a lack of funding. The school will be located entirely on the Nevill campus.

== Results ==
Hove Park School is classified as "Good" by Ofsted, as of 8 December 2021. Prior to this, a Short Inspection took place on 1 March 2017.

However, based on its "Progress 8 score" the school is categorised as Below Average. Only 40% of its GCSE students achieved a Grade 5 or above in Maths & English GCSEs - this figure is substantially lower than a number of other secondary schools in the local authority.

== Notable former pupils ==
- Robert Kazinsky, actor
- ArrDee, rapper
