= 22Gz =

American rapper (born 1997)

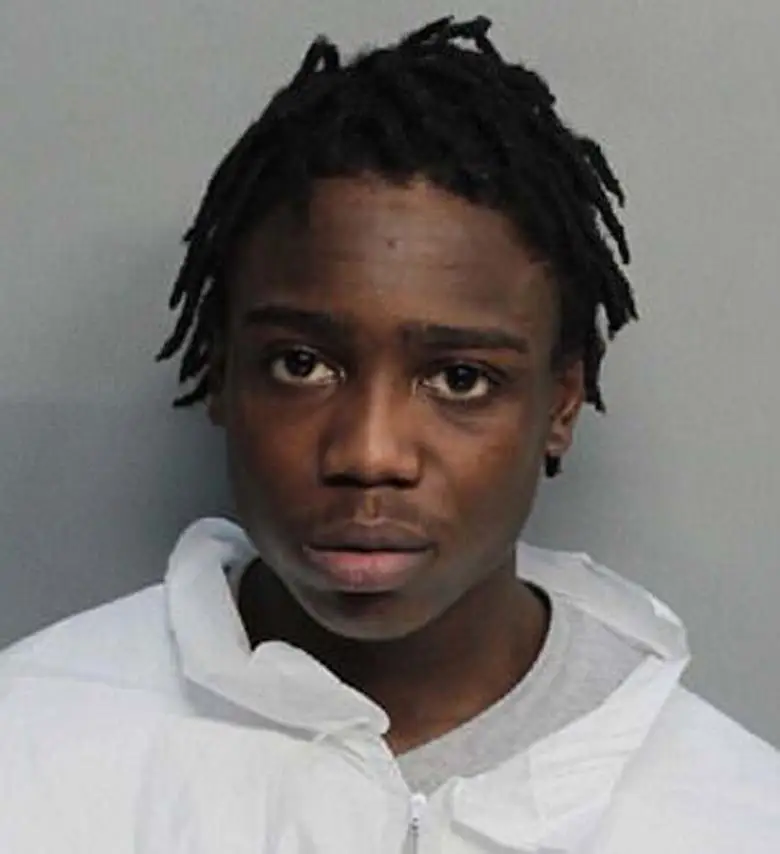
- 22GZ's May 2017 mugshot

Background information
- Also known as: TutuBlixky; The Brooklyn Drill General; TuTu Da General
- Born: Jeffrey Mark Alexander; November 29, 1997 (age 28); Brooklyn, New York City, U.S.
- Genres: Hip hop; Brooklyn drill
- Occupations: Rapper; songwriter
- Instrument: Vocals
- Years active: 2015–present
- Labels: Blixky Ent./Atlantic Foundation Media, LLC

Jeffrey Mark Alexander (born November 29, 1997), known professionally as 22Gz (/tutuˈdʒiːz/ too-too-JEEZ), is an American rapper credited as a pioneer of the Brooklyn drill scene. 22Gz released his first major mixtape, The Blixky Tape, through Atlantic Records in 2019.

== Early life ==
Jeffrey Mark Alexander was born on November 29, 1997, in the Flatbush neighborhood of Brooklyn, New York City. His father died before he was born. He is of Guyanese descent. He started his entertainment career on the New York City Subway performing showtime dance routines.

== Career ==
=== 2015-2018: Career beginnings & Atlantic Records deal ===
22Gz started releasing songs on SoundCloud at the age of 17 in early 2015. After releasing the singles "Blixky" and "Suburban" in 2016, he gained a following from his YouTube videos. "Suburban", produced by London-based drill producer AXL Beats, was regarded as one of the first major Brooklyn drill songs to become popular. 22Gz gained attention, leading him to sign with Atlantic in 2018 and his label A&R helping him become noticed by Kodak Black. One of his first songs released on the label, "Spin the Block", was a collaboration track with Kodak Black.

=== 2019-present: The Blixky Tape & Growth & Development ===
22Gz released his first mixtape with Atlantic, The Blixky Tape, in July 2019. His follow-up mixtape, Growth & Development, was released on April 10, 2020, and was co-produced by London-based drill producer Ghosty. Torsten Ingvaldsen of Hypebeast praised the mixtape, stating 22Gz has "riotous energy, bringing forth aggressive lyrics and militant deliveries that continue to sculpt out his fast-paced rise".

== Legal issues ==
In 2014, he was charged with conspiracy to commit murder, however the charges were dropped. 22Gz spent five months in jail in 2017 for second-degree murder charges related to a shooting in Miami; however, these were later dropped. 22Gz recorded a Facebook Live video from an NYPD holding cell in 2018.

In 2019, Alexander, along with Casanova, Pop Smoke, Sheff G, and Don Q, was removed from the Rolling Loud concert. NYPD cited "a higher risk of violence" if the artists were to perform.

On June 12, 2022, 22Gz was arrested in New York City on attempted murder charges over a March shooting in which three people were injured. He was released on US$500,000 bail four days later.

== Discography ==
=== Mixtapes ===
List of mixtapes, with selected details
Title	Mixtape details	Peak chart positions
Title	Mixtape details	US Heat.
The Blixky Tape	Released: July 19, 2019; Label: Atlantic Records, WEA International; Format: CD, digital download, streaming	—
Growth & Development	Released: April 10, 2020; Label: Atlantic Records, WEA International; Format: CD, digital download, streaming	12
The Blixky Tape 2	Released: March 19, 2021; Label: Atlantic Records; Format: CD, digital download, streaming	20
Growth & Development II	Released: January 12, 2024; Label: Blixky Entertainment; Format: Digital download, streaming	—
Brooklyn's Most Wanted	Released: June 21, 2024; Label: Blixky Entertainment; Format: Digital download, streaming	—
Hidden Gemz	Released: February 21, 2025; Label: Blixky Entertainment, BetterVibesOnly; Format: Digital download, streaming	—

=== Extended plays ===
List of extended plays, with selected details
Title	Extended play details
Year of the Blixky	Released: December 9, 2022; Label: Atlantic Records; Format: Digital download, streaming

=== Singles ===
==== As lead artist ====
List of singles, showing year released and album name
Title	Year	Certifications	Album
"12 Bars"	2015	Non-album singles	
"At The Light" (featuring Theo Zanotti)	2015	Non-album singles	
"Blicky" (featuring Nas Blixky & NiikoSuav)	2016	Non-album singles	
"Regular" (featuring Theo Zanotti & Suavee Jew)	2016	Non-album singles	
"Up Next!" (featuring Breezo Blixky & Nas Blixky)	2016	Non-album singles	
"Suburban"	2016	Non-album singles	
"Vamanos" (featuring Ju Laden & Theo Zanotti)	2017	Non-album singles	
"Ain't Livin My Life"	2017	Non-album singles	
"Invest in a Ratchet" (featuring Big Moose 280)	2017	Non-album singles	
"We On" (featuring Nas Blixky)	2017	Non-album singles	
"First Day Out / Stuck in the Yams"	2017	Non-album singles	
"Why"	2018	Non-album singles	
"Blicky Da Blicky"	2018	Non-album singles	
"Got Those"	2018	Non-album singles	
"Spin the Block" (featuring Kodak Black)	2018	Non-album singles	
"Spazz Out" (featuring PNV Jay & Leeky Bandz)	2018	Non-album singles	
"Drifting" (AXL Beats, Khay B Flockin, Kush Binflockin, & Breezy Blixky)	2019	Non-album singles	
"Sniper Gang (Freestyle)"	2019		The Blixky Tape
"Rerock" (featuring Shawny Binladen)	2019		Non-album singles
"Telephone" (featuring MaxThaDemon & Ciggy Blacc)	2019		Non-album singles
"Suburban, Pt. 2"	2019	RIAA: Gold	Growth & Development
"No Questions"	2020		Growth & Development
"YTB (Yellow Tape Blixky)" (featuring Shawny Binladen & Big Yaya)	2020		Non-album singles
"Do The Most" (featuring PeeGunna)	2020		Non-album singles
"Movie" (Featuring CoachDaGhost)	2020		Non-album singles

==== As featured artist ====
List of singles, showing year released and album name
Title	Year	Album
"Flexin" (Khay B Flockin featuring 22GZ & Kush Binflockin)	2016	Non-album singles
"Jet Li, Pt. 2" (Nick Blixky featuring 22GZ)	2018	Non-album singles
"Drive the Boat" (Nick Blixky featuring 22GZ & Nas Blixky)	2019	Non-album singles
"Upset" (T'up Ty featuring 22GZ)	2019	Excuse the Way I Came Up
"Faded Remix" (B1 featuring 22GZ, Ivorian Doll and Dezzie)	2021	Non-album single

=== Guest appearances ===
Title	Year	Other artists	Album
"Flexin"	2016	Khay B Flockin, Kush Blixky	Blixky
"The Get Back, Pt 1"	2018	T'up Ty	T'd Up, Vol. 1
"Sick of Us"	2018	Envy Caine	2 Many Situations
"Wita Blixky"	2019	C-Clip Beatz	Rap & Beats
"Extra"	2019	Rooga	Back da Fuck Up
"Hoody Szn"	2019	Nym Lo, 183rd, Casanova	High Horse
"Up the Score"	2020	Slayter, Maxo Kream	World Got Me Fucked Up, Vol. 1
