= Meekz =

British rapper

- Also known as: Meekz Manny
- Born: Mico Howles; 20 August 1998 (age 28); Gorton, Manchester, England
- Origin: Harpurhey, Manchester, England
- Genres: UK rap • road rap • UK drill
- Occupation: Rapper
- Instrument: Vocals
- Years active: 2019–present
- Website: meekzmanny.com

Mico Howles (born 20 August 1998), known professionally as Meekz, is a masked British rapper from Manchester. He released his debut EP Can't Stop Won't Stop in 2020, followed by the mixtape Respect the Come Up in 2022. The latter features the song "Fresh Out the Bank" with Dave, which peaked at number 35 on the UK Singles Chart in 2022. In 2024, Meekz released his next mixtape titled Tru, with a follow-up mixtape, Mr Can't Stop Won't Stop, scheduled to be released on 26 June, 2026.

== Music career ==
=== 2020 ===
Meekz released "Year of the Real" produced by MkThePlug featuring notable acts including M1llionz and Pa Salieu.

=== 2022 ===
Meekz appeared on an episode of Amelia Dimoldenberg's Chicken Shop Date.

In November 2022, Meekz released his first mixtape titled Respect the Come Up featuring Central Cee and Dave, among others.

=== 2024 ===
Meekz released his second mixtape titled TRU on 24 May 2024.

== Discography ==
=== Mixtapes ===
List of mixtapes, with selected details and chart positions
Title	Mixtape details	Peak chart positions	Certifications
Title	Mixtape details	UK	Certifications
Can't Stop Won't Stop	Released: 25 June 2020; Label: Young Entrepreneurs; Formats: Digital download, streaming	32	BPI: Silver
Respect the Come Up	Released: 18 November 2022; Label: Neighbourhood Recordings; Formats: CD, LP, digital download, streaming	13	BPI: Silver
TRU	Released: 24 May 2024; Label: Neighbourhood Recordings; Formats: CD, LP, digital download, streaming	12	
Mr Can't Stop Won't Stop	Released: TBA; Label: Neighbourhood Recordings; Formats: CD, LP, cassette, digital download, streaming	To be released	

=== Extended plays ===
List of extended plays, with selected details
Title	Details
Meekzness	Released: 15 December 2023; Label: Self-released; Format: Digital download, streaming

=== Singles ===
==== As lead artist ====
List of singles, with selected chart positions
Title	Year	Peak chart positions	Certifications	Album
Title	Year	UK	Certifications	Album
"Hoods Hottest"	2019	—	BPI: Silver	Non-album single
"6 Figures"	2019	—		Can't Stop Won't Stop
"Year of the Real" (featuring M1llionz, Teeway and Pa Salieu)	2020	—		Non-album single
"Can't Stop Won't Stop"	2020	—	BPI: Silver	Can't Stop Won't Stop
"Like Me"	2020	50	BPI: Gold	Can't Stop Won't Stop
"Respect the Come Up"	2021	58	BPI: Silver	Respect the Come Up
"More Money"	2021	71		Respect the Come Up
"Airmax's"	2022	97		Non-album singles
"Daily Duppy"	2022	—		Non-album singles
"Say Less"	2022	74		Respect the Come Up
"Fresh Out the Bank" (featuring Dave)	2022	35		Respect the Come Up
"Mini Me's"	2024	94		TRU
"Manny"	2024	—	BPI: Silver	TRU
"Jummah"	2024	—		TRU
"—" denotes releases that did not chart or were not released in that territory.

==== As featured artist ====
Title	Year	Peak chart positions	Album
Title	Year	UK	Album
"Unruly" (NSG featuring Meekz)	2023	—	Non-album singles
"Dash Cam" (Rondodasosa featuring Meekz)	2025	—	Non-album singles
"—" denotes a recording that did not chart or was not released in that territory.

=== Other charted and certified songs ===
List of other charted songs, with selected chart positions
Title	Year	Peak chart positions	Certifications	Album
Title	Year	UK	Certifications	Album
"God's Clever"	2020	—	BPI: Silver	Can't Stop Won't Stop
"In the Fire" (Dave featuring Fredo, Meekz, Ghetts and Giggs)	2021	6	BPI: Gold	We're All Alone in This Together
"Don't Like Drill" (with Central Cee)	2022	66		Respect the Come Up
"—" denotes releases that did not chart or were not released in that territory.

== Awards and nominations ==
Year	Award	Categories	Result	Ref.
2020	2020 UK Music Video Awards	Best Hip Hop/Grime/Rap Newcomer	Nominated	
