= Liquor & Cigarettes =

Single by Chase & Status featuring Hedex and ArrDee

from the album 2 Ruff, Vol. 1
- Released: 15 September 2023
- Genre: Drum and bass
- Length: 3:09
- Label: Universal
- Songwriters: ArrDee; Harry Beech; Hedex; Kieran Nash; Saul Milton; Will Kennard
- Producers: Chase & Status; Hedex

Chase & Status singles chronology
"Baddadan" (2023)	"Liquor & Cigarettes" (2023)	"Say the Word" (2023)

Hedex singles chronology
"Missing You" (2023)	"Liquor & Cigarettes" (2023)	"Lowkey (LDN Drift)" (2024)

ArrDee singles chronology
"One Direction" (2023)	"Liquor & Cigarettes" (2023)	"Mad About Bars" (2023)

Music video
- "Liquor & Cigarettes" on YouTube

"Liquor & Cigarettes" is a song by British electronic music duo Chase & Status and Hedex, featuring rapper ArrDee. It was released as a single on 15 September 2023, through Universal.

== Background ==
Chase & Status first teased the song by playing it at a set at Creamfields in summer 2023.

== Music video ==
An official visualiser was released on the same day as the single.

== Chart performance ==
"Liquor & Cigarettes" debuted at number nine on the UK's Official Trending Chart on 19 September 2023, and debuted at number 31 on the UK Official Singles Chart Top 100 on 22 September 2023, peaking at number 20. It also peaked at number 6 on the UK Dance Singles Chart.

== Charts ==
Chart performance for "Liquor & Cigarettes"
Chart (2023)	Peak position
UK Dance (Official Charts)	6
UK Singles (Official Charts)	17

== Certifications ==
Certifications for "Liquor & Cigarettes"
Region	Certification	Certified units/sales
New Zealand (RMNZ)	Gold	15,000^{‡}
United Kingdom (BPI)	Gold	400,000^{‡}
^{‡} Sales+streaming figures based on certification alone.
