= Kenny Allstar =

British DJ

- Born: Kenny Enahoro; 19 April 1993 (age 33); England
- Genres: British hip-hop; grime; afroswing
- Occupations: DJ; radio presenter
- Years active: 2011–present
- Website: www.kennyallstarofficial.com

Kenny Enahoro, (born 19 April 1993), known professionally as Kenny Allstar, is a British DJ and radio presenter who was the host of BBC Radio 1 and 1Xtra's Rap Shows on Friday and Saturday nights. He hosts a Mad About Bars series on Mixtape Madness on YouTube, where he hosts freestyle videos with the next generation of MCs.

== Early life ==
His interest in music arose early in life. With no television in the house, he recalled listening to the radio day and night, trying to play along to 50 Cent on his keyboard.

He was inspired to devote his life to music when his father took him to a carnival when he was nine or ten. At age 13, he started attending a youth club near his school where aspiring MCs could get on the air. Grime was big at that time, and each aspiring MC would pay £2 to rap for eight bars. Soon he decided MCing wasn't for him and began DJing at that local underground online grime station. By his mid-teens, he had bought a cheap set of decks and begun DJing at South London rap cyphers.

== DJ career ==
Before he turned 18, he talked his way into presenting on Deja Vu 92.3 FM. He also presented on London's Radar Radio, toured as Sneakbo's official DJ, and was instrumental in the rise of rapper Abra Cadabra.

His Mad About Bars series on YouTube's Mixtape Madness platform has run for three seasons and over 30 million views. On the series, he has championed rappers such as Skengdo & AM, AJ Tracey, Izzie Gibbs and Kojey Radical.

In November 2017, he was tapped to DJ on BBC Radio 1Xtra, where he appeared in rotation over the next six months. This led to a permanent engagement with BBC Radio 1Xtra, when the platform brought him back in October 2018 to take over the Friday night slot of DJ Semtex, who left after having worked with the station for 15 years. Making the announcement, Mark Strippel, 1XTra's head of programmes, described Kenny as a "core champion for the UK scene."

In 2018, Kenny was at Notting Hill Carnival, playing sets at stages and parties.

In March 2023 he was named as the new host of the Radio 1 Rap Show, simulcast on BBC Radio 1 and 1Xtra every Saturday night, replacing Tiffany Calver.

On 17 April 2026, Allstar presented the last 1Xtra Rap Show programme before moving from the 11pm-1am slot to the 9-11pm slot, replacing Calver.

== Album ==
Kenny's debut album, Block Diaries, was released 5 October 2018 on Columbia Records. Its 17 tracks bring more than 30 musicians together and cover a variety of styles: UK rap, drill, Afroswing, grime. It features a number of rappers and other artists who came into the studio to produce with Kenny for the project, including 67, Not3s, SNE, Abra Cadabra, Belly Squad, and M Huncho. "Tracksuit Love," the album's first single, a collaboration with Headie One, drew over 2.3 million views on YouTube and 1.5 million spins on Spotify in its first three months.

Kenny's aim for the album, he said, was to be a "culturally significant voice for young people in London, those who are growing up on council estates in less fortunate situations." The album title came from Kenny's memories of growing up amid the tower blocks of the estates where he grew up, and his youthful habit of writing his thoughts and feelings in a diary.

== Personal life ==
Kenny is a football fan and supporter of Chelsea F.C.
