= ArrDee =

British rapper (born 2002)

- Born: Riley Jason Davies; 17 September 2002 (age 24); Brighton, England
- Genres: British hip hop; UK drill
- Occupations: Rapper; songwriter
- Years active: 2021–present
- Label: Island

Riley Jason Davies (born 17 September 2002), known professionally as ArrDee, is a British rapper. His debut mixtape, Pier Pressure, was released on 18 March 2022, peaking at number 2 on the UK Albums Chart. ArrDee has received multiple gold and platinum plaques from the British Phonographic Industry (BPI) and Recorded Music NZ (RMNZ). As of 2025, ArrDee is an independent artist, having been dropped by his label.

== Early ==
Riley Jason Davies was born and raised in Brighton, England. He went to Hove Park School in Hove, East Sussex.

== Career ==
=== 2021–2025: Breakthrough and Pier Pressure ===
ArrDee saw success being featured on the remix of Russ Millions and Tion Wayne's song "Body", which topped the charts in various countries including the UK. He then released the single "Oliver Twist", referencing the book by Charles Dickens, which peaked at number six on the UK Singles Chart.

ArrDee's third solo single, "Flowers (Say My Name)", was released on 11 November 2021. The track, sampling both "Flowers" by Sweet Female Attitude and "Say My Name" by Destiny's Child, peaked at number 5 on the UK's Official Singles Chart Top 100, spending thirteen weeks in the Top 40, seventeen weeks in the Top 100, and seven of those weeks in the chart's Top 10.

On 3 February 2022, ArrDee released his single, "War", featuring rapper Aitch. On the same day, it was announced that ArrDee's debut mixtape, titled Pier Pressure would be released on 18 March 2022. "War" debuted at number 6 on the UK Official Singles Top 100 Chart and debuted at number 21 on the UK Official Singles Sales Chart Top 100 on 11 February 2022. On 4 March 2022, ArrDee released "Come & Go" as the next single from the album. "Come & Go" samples rapper Ironik's 2008 single "Stay with Me", which in turn samples "Written in the Stars" by Westlife.

Pier Pressure was released on 18 March 2022 to generally mixed reviews. The mixtape entered the UK Official Albums Chart Top 100 at number 2, placing at number 6 on the UK Official Album Download Charts Top 100 and debuted at number 1 on the UK Official Albums Streaming Chart Top 100 on 25 March 2022. In July 2022, ArrDee announced his next single, "Hello Mate". The track features a sample of "Do You Mind" by Kyla.

In January 2023, ArrDee released the single "Loser". On 9 March 2023, he released the single "Home for My Heart", a collaboration with singer Cat Burns, which saw ArrDee adopting a different sound to what he has released previously. The official music video, directed by Najeeb Tarazi, was released the same day. Actor and writer Kwame Kwei-Armah is credited as a lyricist on the single. After three days of release, the Official Charts Company predicted the track would debut at number 36 on the UK Singles Top 100. "Home for My Heart" debuted and peaked at number 35 on the UK singles chart on 17 March 2023.

In September 2023, ArrDee was featured on Chase & Status' single "Liquor & Cigarettes". That same month, Davies made his acting debut in the feature film, Tate: Ten Days of Blood, the sixth instalment of the Rise of the Footsoldier franchise.

In August 2023, it was announced that ArrDee had collaborated with boohooMAN on a line of clothing, named ArrDee Certified. ArrDee shared, "Clothing was on my list this year and I wanted to make something available for everyone. You don’t need expensive designer to be fly, all my lot wear boohooMAN so it made sense we work and create something cold for tracksuit season". The line was released in September 2023. On 7 March 2024, he released the "Time", featuring French rapper Favé. On 18 July 2024, he released the single "Different", which features house duo The Shapeshifters; the song samples the latter's 2004 debut single "Lola's Theme".

On 3 April 2025, ArrDee released the single "Cross the Line". On 18 July 2025, he released the single "Need Somebody", in collaboration with former So Solid Crew member A!MS.

=== 2026: Lead by Exsample ===
On 29 January 2026, ArrDee released "Yo Yo Yo". He released the single "Braindead", which samples Justin Timberlake's 2006 single "SexyBack", on 3 April 2026. On 22 May 2026, he released the single "I Ain't Complaining". Five days later, he announced the forthcoming release of his EP, Lead by Exsample, which was released on 26 June 2026.

== Personal life ==
In April 2026, ArrDee announced the birth of his first child, a daughter.

ArrDee is a Chelsea supporter

== Controversies ==
In May 2023, adverts for ArrDee's alcohol brand Litty Liquor were banned for featuring ArrDee (who was under 25) and encouraging excessive and irresponsible drinking.

== Filmography ==
=== As actor ===
| Year | Title | Role | Notes |
|---|---|---|---|
| 2023 | Rise of the Footsoldier: Vengeance | Stevey | |

== Discography ==
=== Mixtapes ===
List of mixtapes, with selected details
| Title | Details | Peak chart positions | | | | Certifications |
| Title | Details | UK | AUS | IRE | NZ | Certifications |
|---|---|---|---|---|---|---|
| Pier Pressure | Released: 18 March 2022; Label: Island, Universal; Format: CD, LP, streaming, digital download | 2 | 20 | 14 | 21 | BPI: Gold |

=== Extended plays ===
List of extended plays, with selected details
| Title | Details |
|---|---|
| Lead by Exsample | Released: 26 June 2026; Formats: Digital download, streaming, CD |

=== Singles ===
==== As lead artist ====
List of singles as lead artist, with year released, selected chart positions, and album name shown
| Title | Year | Peak chart positions | | | | | | | Certifications | Album |
| Title | Year | UK | UK R&B | AUS | IRE | NLD | NZ Hot | SWE Heat. | Certifications | Album |
|---|---|---|---|---|---|---|---|---|---|---|
| "Oliver Twist" | 2021 | 6 | 3 | 68 | 19 | — | — | 11 | BPI: Platinum; RMNZ: Gold | Pier Pressure |
| "Jiggy (Whiz)" | 2021 | 99 | — | — | — | — | — | — | | Non-album single |
| "Wid It" (with Tion Wayne) | 2021 | 19 | 6 | — | 41 | — | — | — | BPI: Silver | Green With Envy and Pier Pressure |
| "Flowers (Say My Name)" | 2021 | 5 | 1 | 49 | 17 | 88 | 11 | — | BPI: Platinum; RMNZ: Platinum | Pier Pressure |
| "War" (with Aitch) | 2022 | 6 | 2 | — | 28 | — | 12 | — | BPI: Silver | Pier Pressure |
| "Come & Go" | 2022 | 16 | 6 | — | 67 | — | 25 | — | BPI: Silver | Pier Pressure |
| "Hello Mate" (featuring Kyla) | 2022 | 37 | 14 | — | — | — | 20 | — | | Pier Pressure |
| "Loser" | 2023 | — | — | — | — | — | — | — | | Non-album singles |
| "Home for My Heart" (with Cat Burns) | 2023 | 35 | — | — | 83 | — | 23 | — | | Non-album singles |
| "One Direction" (with Bugzy Malone) | 2023 | 58 | 30 | — | — | — | 39 | — | | Non-album singles |
| "Time" (featuring Favé) | 2024 | — | — | — | — | — | — | — | | Non-album singles |
| "C'est La Vie (More Filler)" (with Z1NO) | 2024 | — | — | — | — | — | — | — | | Non-album singles |
| "Heavyweight" (with K Motionz featuring Riko Dan) | 2024 | — | — | — | — | — | 30 | — | | Non-album singles |
| "Different" (with The Shapeshifters) | 2024 | — | — | — | — | — | — | — | | Non-album singles |
| "Demure" (with LeoStayTrill) | 2024 | — | — | — | — | — | — | — | | Non-album singles |
| "Trust Me" (with Devlin) | 2024 | — | — | — | — | — | — | — | | Non-album singles |
| "Cross the Line" | 2025 | — | — | — | — | — | — | — | | Non-album singles |
| "Milyon Lira" (with Organize) | 2025 | — | — | — | — | — | — | — | | Non-album singles |
| "Need Somebody" (with A!MS) | 2025 | — | — | — | — | — | — | — | | Non-album singles |
| "Trouble" (with Mazza_l20) | 2025 | — | — | — | — | — | — | — | | Non-album singles |
| "Yo Yo Yo" | 2026 | — | — | — | — | — | — | — | | Non-album singles |
| "Braindead" | 2026 | — | — | — | — | — | — | — | | Lead by Exsample |
| "I Ain't Complaining" | 2026 | — | — | — | — | — | — | — | | Lead by Exsample |
"—" denotes that the recording did not chart or was not released in that territory.

==== As featured artist ====
List of singles as featured artist, with year released, selected chart positions, and album name shown
| Title | Year | Peak chart positions | | | | Certifications | Album |
| Title | Year | UK | UK R&B | AUS | NZ | Certifications | Album |
|---|---|---|---|---|---|---|---|
| "Body" (Remix) (Russ Millions and Tion Wayne featuring ArrDee, E1 (3x3), Bugzy Malone, Fivio Foreign, ZT (3x3), Darkoo & Buni) | 2021 | 1 | — | 1 | 1 | | Green With Envy and Pier Pressure |
| "Wasted" (Digga D featuring ArrDee) | 2021 | 6 | 1 | — | — | BPI: Platinum | Pier Pressure and Noughty by Nature |
| "Liquor & Cigarettes" (Chase & Status & Hedex featuring ArrDee) | 2023 | 17 | — | — | — | BPI: Gold; RMNZ: Gold | Non-album singles |
| "The Game" (Rimzee featuring ArrDee) | 2023 | — | — | — | — | | Non-album singles |
| "PARTY" (JC Reyes featuring ArrDee & Big Papa13) | 2024 | — | — | — | — | | Non-album singles |
| "Time Of My Life" Phyno featuring ArrDee | 2024 | — | — | — | — | | Non-album singles |
| "Same Cycle" Hedex featuring ArrDee & Digital Farm Animals | 2025 | — | — | — | — | | Non-album singles |
"—" denotes that the recording did not chart or was not released in that territory.

=== Other charted songs ===
List of other charted songs, with year of charting, selected chart positions, and album name shown
| Title | Year | Peak chart positions | | | Album |
| Title | Year | UK | UK R&B | NZ Hot | Album |
|---|---|---|---|---|---|
| "Early Hours" | 2022 | 41 | 21 | 32 | Pier Pressure |

=== Guest appearances ===
List of non-single guest appearances, with other performing artists
| Title | Year | Other artist(s) | Album |
|---|---|---|---|
| "Envy" | 2023 | NLE Choppa | Cottonwood 2 (Deluxe) |
| "No Diddy" | 2024 | Russ Millions | Shylo |
