= 12World =

British criminal gang

- Named after: W12 postcode
- Years active: 2016–2019
- Territory: Shepherd's Bush and White City, London, England
- Criminal activities: drug trafficking, murder
- Rivals: CGM/1011, 12A/12Anti
- Notable members: S1, Sav12 TR2

12World, also known as W12, was a street gang located in Shepherd's Bush, London.

== History ==
In 2017, members of 12World harassed the grandmother of 1011 member Micah Bedeau, also known as Horrid1 or Huncho; the incident resulted in him and other 1011 members planning a ride-out against 12World, which was stopped by their arrest in November the same year. In 2018, Xeneral Imiuru (alias Xeneral Webster), also known as General and a member of 12World, was sentenced to 17 years in prison for the death of Joanne Rand, considered the first death from an acid attack in the UK. He was later sentenced to life in 2020 for attacking a 50-year old prison officer.

== Music ==
Members of 12World were involved in the UK drill scene; these included Sav12 and S1.
