= M1llionz =

British rapper (born 1997)

- Born: Miguel Rahiece Cunningham; 6 February 1997 (age 29); Handsworth, Birmingham, England
- Genres: British hip hop; UK drill
- Occupations: Rapper; songwriter
- Years active: 2019–present
- Labels: Ten Percent Music

Miguel Rahiece Cunningham (born 6 February 1997), known professionally as M1llionz, is a British rapper from Birmingham, West Midlands.

== Career ==
Born in Handsworth, M1llionz spent some of his childhood in Birmingham but returned to his home area, where he developed his sound with influence from his Jamaican roots. This included the dancehall music which his parents played when he was growing up. He landed a top 40 single, "B1llionz", in 2020, his first song to chart in the UK. His breakthrough single was "North-West", released at the end of 2019 and he also made an impact with his drill anthem "Y Pree" in 2020. His debut mixtape Provisional License was released on 17 September 2021, with features from Headie One, AJ Tracey, Lotto Ash, and Jevon.

== Discography ==
=== Mixtapes ===
Title	Details
Provisional License	Released: 17 September 2021; Label: Ten Percent Music; Format: Digital download

=== Singles ===
==== As lead artist ====
Title	Year	Peak chart positions	Certifications	Album
Title	Year	UK	Certifications	Album
"North West"	2019	–		Non-album singles
"No Rap Cap"	2019	–		Non-album singles
"HDC"	2020	–		Non-album singles
"Year Of The Reel" (with Meekz, Teeway & Pa Salieu)	2020	—		Non-album singles
"BX19"	2020	–		Non-album singles
"Y PREE"	2020	–		Non-album singles
"B1llionz"	2020	39	BPI: Silver	Non-album singles
"LAGGA"	2020	52		Non-album singles
"Experience" (with SkengTrapMob, Tugz & Mwoo)	2020	–		Non-album singles
"BADNIS"	2021	94		Provisional License
"How Many Times" (with Lotto Ash)	2021	95		Provisional License
"Bando Spot"	2021	65		Provisional License
"Regular Bag"	2021	—		Provisional License
"Provisional License" (featuring AJ Tracey)	2021	66		Provisional License
"Air BnB" (featuring Headie One)	2021	—		Provisional License
"NGL"	2022	—		TBA
"8PM In Seaview" (with 1Formation)	2022	—		TBA
"10 To Da O" (with Munna Duke)	2022	—		TBA
"Dr. Miami" (with Booter Bee)	2023	—		True Stories

==== As featured artist ====
Title	Year	Peak chart positions	Certifications	Album
Title	Year	UK	Certifications	Album
"Ride & Clutch Pt 2" (Tana featuring Unknown T, Aitch, M1llionz & JB Scofield)	2020	–		Non-album single
"Cool with Me" (Dutchavelli featuring M1llionz)	2020	29		Dutch from the 5th
"Pounds and Dollars" (Cashh & M1llionz)	2021	–		Non-album singles
"Versus" (SL & M1llionz)	2021	–		Non-album singles
"Jagged Edge" (TSB featuring M1llionz & Unknown T)	2021	–		Non-album singles
"These Streets (Don't Luv U)" (The FaNaTiX featuring M1llionz & Popcaan)	2021	–		Non-album singles
"Olé (We Are England)" (Krept & Konan, S1lva & M1llionz featuring Morrisson)	2021	51		Non-album singles
"Packs And Potions (Remix)" (HAZEY featuring M1llionz, Digga D & Unknown T)	2022	–		Non-album singles

=== Guest appearances ===
List of non-single guest appearances, with other performing artists, showing year released and album name
Title	Year	Other artist(s)	Album
"No Chorus"	2021	Digga D	Made in the Pyrex
"Vin Diesel"	2021	Unknown T	Adolescence
"Black2Black"	2022	Groundworks, M Woo	The G Tape: Volume 1
