= Link Up TV =

UK music outlet on YouTube

- Company type: Privately held
- Industry: Entertainment, music
- Genre: British hip hop; Afrobeats; road rap; grime; trap; afroswing; UK drill
- Founded: 6 June 2008; 18 years ago
- Founders: Rashid Kasirye; Michael Edu; Taz Bunnett; Enea Tanku
- Headquarters: Waterfront Studios, 1 Dock Road, London, England
- Area served: United Kingdom
- Divisions: Link Up TV - Trax
- Website: thelinkup.com

Link Up TV is a music promotional platform based in London, United Kingdom. It has the second largest rap-based promotional YouTube channel in the United Kingdom after GRM Daily with over 11,111 videos uploaded, 1.7 million subscribers and 1.6 billion views. The site is owned by Rashid Kasirye and Enea Tanku, with the YouTube channel being launched in 2008 and the company being incorporated in 2012.

== See also ==
- GRM Daily
- Mixtape Madness
- SB.TV
