= Mixtape Madness =

UK urban music outlet

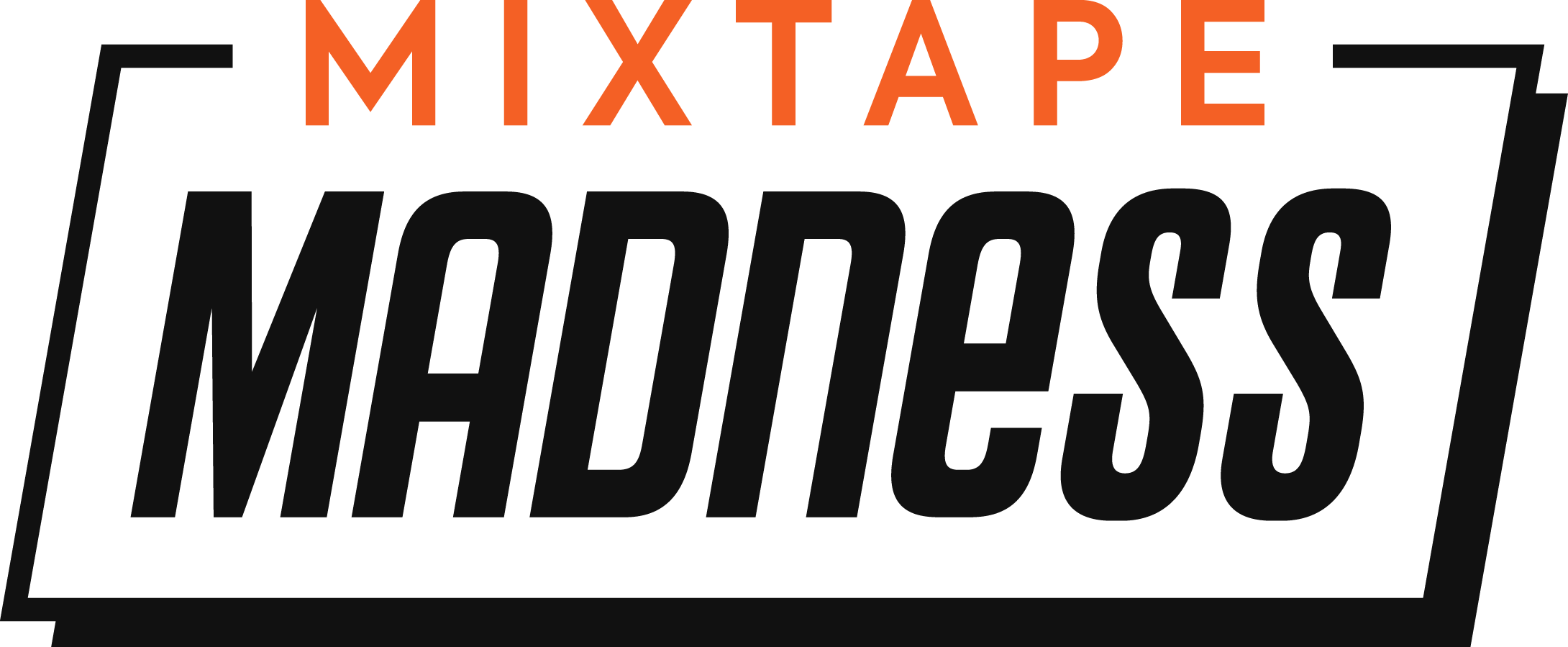
- Type: Private
- Industry: Entertainment, music
- Genre: British hip hop; UK drill; afroswing; road rap; trap
- Founded: September 2010
- Founders: Eddie Agyeman, Kingsley Okyere, Kwabz Ayim, Andy Ayim
- Area served: United Kingdom
- Website: mixtapemadness.com

Mixtape Madness is a British urban music outlet and an entertainment and distribution platform based in London, United Kingdom. The platform was founded in 2010 by a group of friends. Mixtape Madness is the 3rd biggest media outlet platform in the UK, behind GRM Daily and Link Up TV.

== Overview ==
Mixtape Madness was formed in 2010 as a place where users could go and stream or download British mixtapes without having to go to American websites that lacked a focus on British music, such as DatPiff.

Mixtape Madness hosts talk shows called MMTalks that feature people involved in the British urban music industry. The topics covered are varied, with some focusing on how to build a music business, or how to build your profile as a musician.

Mixtape Madness also has a YouTube channel, where artists can release music. Various artists have released their music through the platform, such as Headie One, Unknown T, SL, and EO.

In July 2018, Mixtape Madness hosted a stage at The Butterfly Effect Festival in London.

On 1 April 2019, Mixtape Madness partnered with Caroline International in a worldwide sales and distribution deal. Caroline would also be responsible for marketing services when required.

Mixtape Madness partnered with the FIFA eWorld Cup, an esports competition that was hosted at The O2 in London, to bring 4 hip hop artists to perform and compete in a rap competition in the arena prior to the eWorld Cup's final. The winner out of the 4 artists would receive a FIFA Head 2 Head Freestyle Champion 2019 award. Big Jest and Deekayy both attended the competition, with the latter winning the award after a vote held by the in-house crowd and social media.

== Freestyle series ==
The Mixtape Madness YouTube channel hosts three freestyle series' called Next Up, The Cold Room and Mad About Bars, the latter is hosted by Tweeko, a renowned British Sound Engineer and the third of which is hosted by Kenny Allstar. Artists such as Unknown T, Skengdo & AM, and M Huncho have received significant attention through their Mad About Bars freestyles. Unknown T personally credited Mad About Bars for being "huge" for him and for "opening doors". Skengdo & AM's freestyle has over 30 million views, substantially higher to most other Mad About Bars. Loski's Mad About Bars freestyle had over a million views, before being removed by YouTube.

== See also ==
- Link Up TV
- SB.TV
- GRM Daily
