= GRM Daily =

UK urban music outlet

- Company type: Privately held
- Industry: Entertainment, music
- Genre: Hip hop; British hip hop; UK drill; trap; afroswing; road rap; grime; UK garage
- Founded: 2009
- Founders: Matt 'Sketchy' Thorne; Pierre Godson-Amamoo; Koby 'Posty' Hagan
- Area served: United Kingdom
- Website: grmdaily.com

GRM Daily (Grime & Rap Music Daily), formerly Grime Daily, is a British urban music outlet and entertainment platform. The platform covers UK rap and its various genres, such as UK drill, afroswing, trap, and British hip hop; and electronic genres such as UK garage and grime.

GRM Daily is the largest media outlet platform in the UK, followed by Link Up TV, SB.TV, Pressplay Media and Mixtape Madness.

== History ==
In the early 2000s, pirate radio stations such as Rinse FM and DvDs such as Risky Roadz and Lord of the Mics were the only major platforms that grime and UK rap artists could promote themselves through. This meant it was often difficult for an artist to find an audience. With this in mind, Jamal Edwards founded SB.TV in 2007, an online music platform that would be used to showcase artists and allow them an easy platform to release music through. This was followed by the founding of Link Up TV a year later, and finally Grime Daily in 2009, all based on the same concept. Collectively these platforms have served as the backbone to much of UK urban music and provided a large outlets for artists to gain popularity and fame.

Grime Daily was formed in 2009 by founders Matt 'Sketchy' Thorne, Pierre Godson-Amamoo and Koby 'Posty' Hagan. The platform was created in order to create a space for UK urban artists to showcase themselves and release music. At the time, the platform was named 'Grime Daily', to denote its affiliation with the grime music scene. For the first week, the website was used to upload old grime DvDs and videos, however they also wanted to film their own unique content. Initially, the plan was to have Jamal Edwards film content which would then be uploaded to Grime Daily, however Jamal instead filmed content for his own platform SB.TV. Posty instead decided to buy a camera and film content for Grime Daily himself. The "Daily" is a reference to the fact that the outlet originally intended to release grime related content every single day. Early on, one way this was done was by doing long interviews with artists, splitting the interview into parts, and releasing the parts from the interview throughout the week. An interview with grime artist J2K was Grime Daily's first ever interview. Co-founder Sketchy had previously built J2K's MySpace page, which led to Posty asking Sketchy to build the Grime Daily website. In its early days, the website struggled with high traffic and would go down on occasion. Within the first year, they hit over a million views a month.

In 2011, the original Grime Daily YouTube channel was taken down by YouTube, resulting in the loss of over 2000 videos. It was alleged that this was because a man had shown a knife on a music video for one of Scorcher's songs, however this was denied by both Scorcher and Grime Daily (the music video was still actually available on the artist's own channel). Posty also stated it was claimed the channel was terminated due to receiving 3 copyright strikes, however this was disputed by Posty and Sketchy. Posty also stated they were told someone had bought views for a video. Posty, one of GRM's founders, stated in a 2020 interview that he still did not know why the channel was originally taken down. The platform rebranded as GRM Daily in 2012, which stands for "Grime and Rap Music", and created a new YouTube channel (the one-year delay was due to a fear that the channel would be banned again if they returned too quickly). The new name was to clarify its expanded scope with not just grime, but also British hip hop and related genres.

In 2012 Grime Daily joined with The BiG! Agency, now taking responsibility for the commercial operations of GRM Daily's website, and Silver Bullet Digital (SBD).

In 2013, GRM Daily had over 40,000 subscribers on their YouTube channel. It took 7 years (from its founding) for GRM Daily to gain over 100,000 subscribers on YouTube. The channel rapidly grew from there, earning over a million in 2018, and 5 million by 2022. In 2015, GRM created the Rated Awards, an awards show dedicated to UK urban music.

In 2020, GRM released a documentary entitled "Together We Rise", detailing the platforms history. The platform released "GRM 10", an album to celebrate the platforms 10 year anniversary. The album featured artists such as Aitch, B Young, Unknown T, D Double E, M Huncho, Dutchavelli, Not3s, Blade Brown, Nafe Smallz, Yxng Bane, and others.

== "Daily Duppy" ==
"Daily Duppy" is a platform for freestyle releases. The platform was launched as a response to the success of Jamal Edwards' "Fresh 64" ("F64") release series on SB.TV, where artists rapped 64 bars of original ("fresh") content. As of 2022, after more than a decade of releases, "Daily Duppy" singles have charted seven times on the UK Singles Chart and three of them, by Aitch, J Hus, and Fredo, have been certified Silver by the British Phonographic Industry (BPI).

=== Singles ===
List of "Daily Duppy" singles with selected chart positions and certifications
Artist	Year	Peak chart positions	Certifications
Artist	Year	UK	Certifications
Aitch	2018	99	BPI: Silver
J Hus	2019	42	BPI: Silver
Fredo	2020	46	BPI: Silver
Digga D	2020	59	
Young Adz	2021	44	
Central Cee	2021	35	
Bugzy Malone	2022	55	
Nines	2023	20	

== Legacy ==
By 2012, the Grime Daily website was taking in 70 million website hits and had over 50,000 daily visitors. The platform played a part in popularising artists such as Tinie Tempah, Tinchy Stryder, and Wretch 32 in the early 2010s.

GRM Daily has been very influential in propping up UK urban artists from various genres, such as grime, British hip hop, and Afroswing. The platform has been credited for bringing fame to artists such as Stormzy, Dave, J Hus, B Young, Amelia Monét, Kojo Funds, Steel Banglez, Not3s, Mabel, and many others. GRM Daily, along with related platforms such as Link Up TV and Pressplay Media, have created an ecosystem that allows artists to easily record, produce, and release music to the masses without the need of support from traditional media or the music industry.

=== Controversies ===
In 2010, DJ Werewolf was hit in the chest and buttocks after an individual pulled out a Mac-10 submachine gun and fired rounds at a GRM Daily event, containing over 600 people, celebrating their anniversary. Another unidentified woman and man were also shot in the incident. Police claimed they were not informed the event was happening. Donatella Panayiotou, the presenter of the event, quit working for GRM Daily as a result of the shooting, and criticised them for their handling of the event.

In 2018, British rapper Young Spray was stabbed at GRM Daily's Rated Awards event.

== See also ==
- Mixtape Madness
- Link Up TV
- SB.TV
