= CGM (rap group) =

British hip hop collective

- Also known as: 1011; Cherish God More
- Origin: Ladbroke Grove, London, England
- Genres: British hip hop; UK drill
- Years active: 2015–present
- Label: CGM
- Members: See list
- Past members: See list

CGM (an initialism for Cherish God More, Constantly Getting Money, Certified Grove Members etc.) is a British UK drill collective based in Ladbroke Grove, London, specifically the housing units surrounding Portobello Road. Formerly known as 1011, after the W10 and W11 postal codes, they are considered to be one of the pioneers of the UK drill scene. Their most popular rapper, Digga D, has received the inaugural trailblazer award at the Rolling Stone UK Awards in November 2023.

According to criminology expert Dr Simon Harding, they are a "middle-tier gang known for violence". The gang has a lengthy criminal history and rivals from surrounding areas including Shepherds Bush and Harrow Road, but also distant areas such as Epping and nearby towns in Essex. Their allies, among others, are based in Latimer Road and Queen's Crescent in Camden Town.

CGM made headlines in June 2018 when members were jailed for plotting a knife attack in West London. In June 2026, Ellis Heather aka Rack5, a CGM rapper, was sentenced to life in prison for murdering Steven Morrison in Epping, Essex in 2020. Lyrics from his songs bragging about the ordeal were vital for his conviction.

== History ==
In 2015, Digga D formed the UK drill group 1011 (then 916 at the time) along with his friends in a local youth club in Ladbroke Grove. They released several singles from 2016 to 2017 including: "Kill Confirmed", "Play for the Pagans", and "No Hook". The group has since been banned from making music together and later rebranded as CGM, an acronym for Cherish God More, Constantly Getting Money, Certified Grove Members etc. In 2017, the group had rebranded and named themselves ‘1011’ due to their past split within 916 in 2016. The group has engaged in a rivalry with artists from collectives such as 156 (including Northolt) and 12Anti (Shepherds Bush). The latter including popular act Central Cee.

== Current members ==
The list below includes confirmed members of CGM:

- Digga D (Rhys Herbert)
- Dodgy (also known as Alfie Richards, AP, and formerly Itchy)
- Horrid1 (also known as Micah Bedeau, Huncho)
- Ice (aka Ten Out Of Ten, TenTen)
- Johnny5ive
- Kizzle
- MSkum (also known as Isaac Marshall)
- Rack5 (also known as Ellis Heather)
- Sav'O (also known as Jsav, Jordan Bedeau)
- Splasha (SP)
- Young Febz (aka Y.Febz)
- Young Zapps (aka YZ)
- ZK (also known as Zackariaa Dadi, formerly Eleven)

== Former members ==
- JDF (aka JoDaFlippa, Flippa)
- CJ (also known as Jordan Clarke)
- Striker (also known as Lugavelz, deceased)
- Loose1 (formerly KaySav)
- Sini Sayso
- TY (aka Yonas Girma)

There were also other members who have been de-recruited, such as R1 and R9.

== Legal issues ==
On 9 November 2017, 1011 were arrested in a stop and search in which they were carrying machetes and baseball bats. 1011 claimed they were making a drill music video, but police stated they were planning to attack a rival gang, 12World. 1011 were convicted of conspiracy to commit violent disorder, sentenced to a year in jail, and was given a Criminal Behaviour Order (CBO) in 2018 that required the group to have the Metropolitan Police's permission before releasing any new music, forbade them from using London postcodes, and banning references in lyrics to real-life incidents and people. Four of the group's music videos prior to the CBO were taken down, however, they were noted to have amassed over ten million combined views before removal.

The CBO ban issued to 1011 was condemned by the campaign group Index on Censorship and widely described as entirely unprecedented. Digga's lawyer noted that the CBO "gives the police and probation the ability to control and censor his art." The Metropolitan Police has since denied it was censorship. Det Ch Supt Kevin Southworth said at the time: "When in this instance you see a particular genre of music being used specifically to goad, to incite, to provoke, to inflame, that can only lead to acts of very serious violence being committed, that’s when it becomes a matter for the police. We're not in the business of killing anyone's fun, we're not in the business of killing anyone's artistic expression - we are in the business of stopping people being killed."

In July 2025, two CGM members, Yonas Girma and Ellis Heather, known mononymously as TY and Rack5 respectively, were charged with the 2020 murder of Steven Morrison in Epping, Essex. By the following year the trial culminated in a murder conviction for only Ellis Heather (Rack5), after his codefendant, Yonas Girma, gave evidence against him; incriminating lyrics from their songs were also shown to the court. TY, who was acquitted, was described by the BBC as a "reformed gang member", having previously rebranded as a wildlife influencer. As a result of his cooperation during the trial he had fallen out with the CGM collective.

== Discography ==
=== Mixtapes ===
- Horrid1 and Sav'o - Violent Siblings (2022)
- Horrid1 and Sav'o - Evil brothers (2022)

Title	Year	Certifications	Album
"Kill Confirmed" (as 1011, with Digga D & Sav'o)	2017		Non-album singles
"Play for the Pagans" (as 1011, with Digga D, Sav'o & Horrid1)	2017		Non-album singles
"No Hook" (as 1011, with (CGM) ZK, Digga D, MSkum, Sav'o & Horrid1)	2017		Non-album singles
"Next Up?" (as 1011, with Mixtape Madness, Digga D, Sav'o & (CGM) TY)	2017	BPI: Gold	Non-album singles
"No Porkies" (with Digga D, Sav'o & (CGM) ZK)	2018		Non-album singles
"10+1" (with Splasha, MSkum, (CGM) Striker, Dodgy, Rack5, (CGM) TY, Horrid1, Sav'o & Digga D)	2019		Non-album singles
