= D-Block Europe discography =

- Studio albums: 3
- Singles: 51
- Mixtapes: 7

The discography of British hip-hop collective D-Block Europe consists of three studio albums, six mixtapes, and fifty-one singles (including six as a featured artist).

== Studio albums ==
List of studio albums, with selected details and peak chart positions
Title	Details	Peak chart positions						Certifications
Title	Details	UK	UK R&B/HH	AUS	BEL (FL)	IRE	NLD	Certifications
The Blue Print: Us vs. Them	Released: 9 October 2020; Label: D-Block Europe, Caroline, UMG; Format: CD, LP, digital download, streaming	2	1	—	—	37	61	BPI: Platinum
Lap 5	Released: 23 September 2022; Label: D-Block Europe, EGA Distro, UMG; Format: CD, LP, digital download, cassette, streaming	2	1	75	118	13	35	BPI: Gold
Rolling Stone	Released: 12 January 2024; Label: D-Block Europe, EGA Distro, UMG; Format: CD, digital download, cassette, streaming	1	1	—	—	15	—	BPI: Silver
"—" denotes a recording that did not chart or was not released in that territory.

== Mixtapes ==
List of mixtapes, with selected details and peak chart positions
Title	Details	Peak chart positions				Certifications
Title	Details	UK	UK R&B/HH	BEL (FL)	IRE	Certifications
Any Minute Now (with Yxng Bane)	Released: 20 July 2018; Label: Self-released; Format: Digital download, streaming	14	11	—	—	BPI: Silver
Home Alone	Released: 15 February 2019; Label: D-Block Europe, Caroline, UMG; Format: CD, digital download, streaming	6	9	—	—	BPI: Gold
PTSD	Released: 27 September 2019; Label: D-Block Europe, Caroline, UMG; Format: CD, digital download, streaming	4	2	—	54	BPI: Platinum
Street Trauma	Released: 27 December 2019; Label: D-Block Europe, Caroline, UMG; Format: CD, digital download, streaming	9	13	—	—	BPI: Gold
Home Alone 2	Released: 19 November 2021; Label: D-Block Europe, Caroline, UMG; Format: CD, digital download, cassette, streaming	6	1	98	20	BPI: Platinum
DBE World	Released: 7 July 2023; Label: D-Block Europe, EGA Distro, UMG; Format: CD, digital download, cassette, streaming	6	2	—	58	BPI: Silver
PTSD 2	Released: 14 November 2025; Label: D-Block Europe, EGA Distro, UMG; Format: CD, digital download, cassette, streaming	4	1	—	31	
Worldwide Wave (with French Montana)	Released: 11 September 2026; Label: D-Block Europe, Virgin; Format: CD, LP, digital download, streaming	—	—	—	—	
"—" denotes a recording that did not chart or was not released in that territory.

== Singles ==
=== As lead artist ===
List of singles as lead artist, with selected chart positions, showing year released and album name
Title	Year	Peak chart positions										Certifications	Album
Title	Year	UK	UK R&B/HH	AUS	CAN	FRA	GER	IRE	NLD	SWE	WW	Certifications	Album
"3 Gutta Remix, Pt. 2" (featuring Gabos, 9Goddy, K Trap, Abra Cadabra)	2017	—	—	—	—	—	—	—	—	—	—		Non-album singles
"Love of the Money"	2017	—	—	—	—	—	—	—	—	—	—		Non-album singles
"Trap House"	2017	—	—	—	—	—	—	—	—	—	—		Non-album singles
"Finding You" (featuring Don Andre)	2017	—	—	—	—	—	—	—	—	—	—		Non-album singles
"Large Amounts" (solo or remix featuring Abra Cadabra)	2017	—	—	—	—	—	—	—	—	—	—	BPI: Silver	Non-album singles
"Trophy" (featuring Not3s)	2017	—	—	—	—	—	—	—	—	—	—		Non-album singles
"Favourite Girl" (featuring Young T & Bugsey)	2017	—	—	—	—	—	—	—	—	—	—		Non-album singles
"The Shard"	2018	—	—	—	—	—	—	—	—	—	—	BPI: Silver	Non-album singles
"Mazzaleen"	2018	—	—	—	—	—	—	—	—	—	—		Non-album singles
"Gucci Mane" (with Yxng Bane)	2018	49	32	—	—	—	—	—	—	—	—	BPI: Silver	Any Minute Now
"Nassty" (featuring Lil Pino)	2018	35	15	—	—	—	—	—	—	—	—	BPI: Platinum	Non-album single
"Kitchen Kings"	2019	16	8	—	—	—	—	—	—	—	—	BPI: Platinum	Home Alone
"Home Pussy"	2019	20	11	—	—	—	—	—	—	—	—	BPI: Platinum	PTSD
"Nookie" (featuring Lil Baby)	2019	16	10	—	—	—	—	—	—	—	—	BPI: Silver	PTSD
"Playing for Keeps" (featuring Dave)	2019	21	12	—	—	—	—	—	—	—	—	BPI: Silver	PTSD
"No Cellular Site"	2019	29	21	—	—	—	—	—	—	—	—	BPI: Silver	Street Trauma
"Madow Like"	2020	—	—	—	—	—	—	—	—	—	—		Non-album single
"Free 22"	2020	31	21	—	—	—	—	—	—	—	—		The Blue Print: Us vs. Them
"Plain Jane"	2020	30	24	—	—	—	—	—	—	—	—		The Blue Print: Us vs. Them
"We Won"	2020	31	18	—	—	—	—	—	—	—	—	BPI: Silver	The Blue Print: Us vs. Them
"UFO" (with Aitch)	2020	11	7	—	—	—	—	52	—	—	—	BPI: Platinum	The Blue Print: Us vs. Them
"Ferrari Horses" (with Raye)	2021	14	5	—	—	—	—	27	—	—	—	BPI: Platinum	The Blue Print: Us vs. Them
"Kevin McCallister" (with Lil Pino)	2021	40	13	—	—	—	—	—	—	—	—	BPI: Silver	Home Alone 2
"Lake 29"	2021	42	18	—	—	—	—	—	—	—	—		Non-album single
"No Competition"	2021	18	5	—	—	—	—	70	—	—	—	BPI: Silver	Home Alone 2
"Overseas" (with Central Cee)	2021	6	2	—	—	—	—	19	—	—	—	BPI: 2× Platinum	Home Alone 2
"Make You Smile" (with AJ Tracey)	2021	15	21	—	—	—	—	48	—	—	—	BPI: Platinum	Home Alone 2
"Black Beatles"	2022	35	18	—	—	—	—	—	—	—	—		Lap 5
"Elegant & Gang" (with Ghost Killer)	2022	18	8	—	—	—	—	61	—	—	—	BPI: Gold	Lap 5
"Fantasy"	2022	49	—	—	—	—	—	—	—	—	—		Lap 5
"Man in the Mirror"	2022	40	15	—	—	—	—	—	—	—	—		Lap 5
"4 the Win"	2022	23	8	—	—	—	—	63	—	—	—		Lap 5
"Tears in My Amiri's"	2023	58	31	—	—	—	—	—	—	—	—		Non-album singles
"Barbie"	2023	49	29	—	—	—	—	—	—	—	—		Non-album singles
"1 on 1"	2023	48	30	—	—	—	—	—	—	—	—		Non-album singles
"Side Effects"	2023	53	25	—	—	—	—	—	—	—	—		DBE World
"Pakistan" (with Clavish)	2023	8	3	—	—	—	—	34	—	—	—	BPI: Gold	DBE World
"Potential"	2023	48	27	—	—	—	—	—	—	—	—		DBE World
"Prada" (with Cassö and Raye)	2023	2	—	3	50	16	1	1	1	1	21	BPI: 3× Platinum; ARIA: 5× Platinum; BVMI: 3× Gold; MC: Gold; IFPI DEN: Gold; GLF: Platinum	Non-album single
"I Need It Now"	2023	78	32	—	—	—	—	—	—	—	—		Rolling Stone
"Skims"	2024	72	—	—	—	—	—	—	—	—	—		Rolling Stone
"Eagle" (with Noizy)	2024	19	7	—	—	—	—	—	—	—	—	BPI: Silver	Rolling Stone
"KiKi (What Would Drizzy Say?)"	2024	46	—	—	—	—	—	—	—	—	—		Non-album singles
"City Girls/Trackstar" (with Yxng Bane)	2024	—	—	—	—	—	—	—	—	—	—		Non-album singles
"Gold Mine" (with Aitch)	2024	71	16	—	—	—	—	—	—	—	—		Non-album singles
"Won't Ever Know" (featuring 9Goddy)	2024	85	—	—	—	—	—	—	—	—	—		Non-album singles
"Ski Talk" (featuring Young Adz)	2025	— (Note: "Ski Talk" did not enter the UK Singles Chart, as chart rules only allow three songs per artist to chart within the top 100 at a time, but peaked at number 38 on the UK Independent Singles Chart.)	35	—	—	—	—	—	—	—	—		PTSD 2
"Euro Nights" (featuring Young Adz)	2025	— (Note: "Euro Nights" did not enter the UK Singles Chart, as chart rules only allow three songs per artist to chart within the top 100 at a time, but peaked at number 50 on the UK Video Streaming Chart.)	—	—	—	—	—	—	—	—	—		Non-album singles
"Destiny's Child" (featuring Young Adz)	2025	— (Note: "Destiny's Child" did not enter the UK Singles Chart, as chart rules only allow three songs per artist to chart within the top 100 at a time, but peaked at number 52 on the UK Video Streaming Chart.)	—	—	—	—	—	—	—	—	—		Non-album singles
"Ski Flow" (featuring Young Adz)	2025	— (Note: "Ski Flow" did not enter the UK Singles Chart, as chart rules only allow three songs per artist to chart within the top 100 at a time, but peaked at number 48 on the UK Independent Singles Chart.)	—	—	—	—	—	—	—	—	—		Non-album singles
"Pour the Maka" (featuring Young Adz)	2025	— (Note: "Pour the Maka" did not enter the UK Singles Chart, as chart rules only allow three songs per artist to chart within the top 100 at a time, but peaked at number 28 on the UK Video Streaming Chart.)	—	—	—	—	—	—	—	—	—		Non-album singles
"Wrongs" (with Lil Tjay)	2025	51	16	—	—	—	—	—	—	—	—		PTSD 2
"Performative Pain" (with Rich the Kid)	2025	—	—	—	—	—	—	—	—	—	—		PTSD 2
"Bad Luck"	2025	44	11	—	—	—	—	—	—	—	—		PTSD 2
"Yeah Baby" (featuring Young Adz)	2026	91	—	—	—	—	—	—	—	—	—		Non-album single
"Mazzaleen" (with Fredo)	2026	—	—	—	—	—	—	—	—	—	—		Motion Sickness
"Turn Off the Light" (featuring Young Adz)	2026	—	—	—	—	—	—	—	—	—	—		Non-album single
"Sepa" (with Big Papa313 and Morad)	2026	99	—	—	—	—	—	—	—	—	—		Non-album single
"PMW" (with Noizy)	2026	—	—	—	—	—	—	—	—	—	—		TBA
"Fully Loaded" (with French Montana)	2026	—	—	—	—	—	—	—	—	—	—		Worldwide Wave
"Rico" (with French Montana)	2026	—	—	—	—	—	—	—	—	—	—		Worldwide Wave
"Rips & Fr33" (with French Montana)	2026	—	—	—	—	—	—	—	—	—	—		Worldwide Wave
"—" denotes a recording that did not chart or was not released in that territory.

=== As featured artist ===
List of singles as featured artist, with selected chart positions, showing year released and album name
Title	Year	Peak chart positions				Certifications	Album
Title	Year	UK	UK R&B	IRE	NLD	Certifications	Album
"Tell the Truth" (The Plug featuring D-Block Europe and Rich The Kid)	2018	—	—	—	—		Plug Talk
"Abloh" (Frenna featuring D-Block Europe)	2019	—	—	—	29		Non-album singles
"New Dior" (DigDat featuring D-Block Europe)	2019	16	8	—	—	BPI: Gold	Ei8ht Mile
"Self-Obsessed" (Da Beatfreakz featuring Krept & Konan, D-Block Europe and Deno)	2020	27	10	—	—		Non-album singles
"Cut Me Off" (Yxng Bane featuring D-Block Europe)	2020	65	35	—	—		Non-album singles
"Tonight" (Ghost Killer Track featuring D-Block Europe and Oboy)	2021	48	25	—	—		Non-album singles
"Rocket Science" (Clavish featuring D-Block Europe)	2022	9	3	40	—	BPI: Gold	Rap Game Awful
"Most Definitely" (Clavish featuring D-Block Europe)	2024	88	—	—	—		Chapter 16
"Ayouba" (Dystinct featuring D-Block Europe)	2025	—	—	—	—		Bababa World
"—" denotes a recording that did not chart or was not released in that territory.

== Other charted and certified songs ==
List of other charted songs, with selected chart positions and certifications, showing year released and album name
Title	Year	Peak chart positions			Certifications	Album
Title	Year	UK	UK R&B	IRE	Certifications	Album
"Cocktail" (with Yxng Bane)	2018	—	—	—	BPI: Silver	Any Minute Now
"Running Man"	2019	70	—	—	BPI: Silver	Home Alone
"Kettle Pouring"	2019	62	37	—		Home Alone
"Keeper" (featuring Lil Pino, M Huncho and Nafe Smallz)	2019	—	—	—	BPI: Silver	Home Alone
"Rich" (The Plug featuring D-Block Europe and Offset)	2019	53	35	—	BPI: Silver	Plug Talk
"Intro"	2019	—	14	—		PTSD
"Outside"	2019	42	27	—	BPI: Gold	PTSD
"Darling"	2019	94	33	—	BPI: Platinum	PTSD
"Thug"	2019	—	35	—	BPI: Silver	PTSD
"Pretty Little Nike Airs" (with Yxng Bane)	2019	—	—	—	BPI: Silver	PTSD
"Tell Me" (Krept & Konan featuring D-Block Europe and Ling Hussle)	2019	23	12	—	BPI: Silver	Revenge Is Sweet
"Creep"	2019	53	39	—		Street Trauma
"Molly World"	2019	63	—	—		Street Trauma
"Monster"	2019	—	—	—	BPI: Silver	Street Trauma
"Indulge"	2020	—	—	—	BPI: Silver	Huncholini the 1st
"Destiny"	2020	34	22	—		The Blue Print: Us vs. Them
"Proud" (featuring Young Adz)	2020	55	—	—	BPI: Gold	The Blue Print: Us vs. Them
"Perkosex"	2020	62	—	—	BPI: Silver	The Blue Print: Us vs. Them
"Birds Are Chirping"	2020	—	—	—	BPI: Silver	The Blue Print: Us vs. Them
"Drunkfxckstupid"	2020	—	—	—	BPI: Silver	The Blue Print: Us vs. Them
"Funny Bunny Nails"	2021	35	12	—		Home Alone 2
"Desire"	2021	—	—	—	BPI: Gold	Home Alone 2
"Conor McGregor"	2022	39	18	—	BPI: Silver	Lap 5
"She's Not Anyone"	2022	30	11	77	BPI: Silver	Lap 5
"Cuban Links" (with Skrapz and Nines)	2024	—	24	—		Reflection
"Yurrr" (featuring Central Cee)	2025	84	34	—		PTSD 2
"—" denotes a recording that did not chart or was not released in that territory.

== Guest appearances ==
List of non-single guest appearances, with year released, other artist(s) and album name shown
Title	Year	Other artist(s)	Album
"All Year"	2018	K-Trap	The Re-Up
"How Many Times"	2018	Smoke Boys	Dont Panic II
"Filthy"	2019	Styles P	S.P The Goat: Ghost of All Time
"Tell Me"	2019	Krept and Konan, Ling Hussle	Revenge Is Sweet
"Rockstar"	2020	Yxng Bane	Quarantine: The Lost Files
"Blem"	2020	Dopebwoy, SNRO	Hoogseizoen
"Bentayga"	2020	K-Trap	Street Side Effects
"Ouija Board"	2020	Pressa	Gardner Express
"Hersheys"	2021	Chip	Snakes & Ladders
"From The Block"	2021	Fenix Flexin	Fenix Flexin Vol. 1
"West End"	2021	Tion Wayne	Green With Envy
"38"	2022	M Huncho	Chasing Euphoria
"Gelato 41"	2022	Nafe Smallz	Legacy
"Scary Sight"	2022	Zack Ink, Jack	Eigen Richting
"Cuban Links"	2024	Skrapz, Nines	Reflection
"Rockstar in Designer"	2024	K-Trap	Smile?
"Taste"	2025	Nemzzz	Rent's Due (Deluxe)
