= List of UK top-ten albums in 2020 =

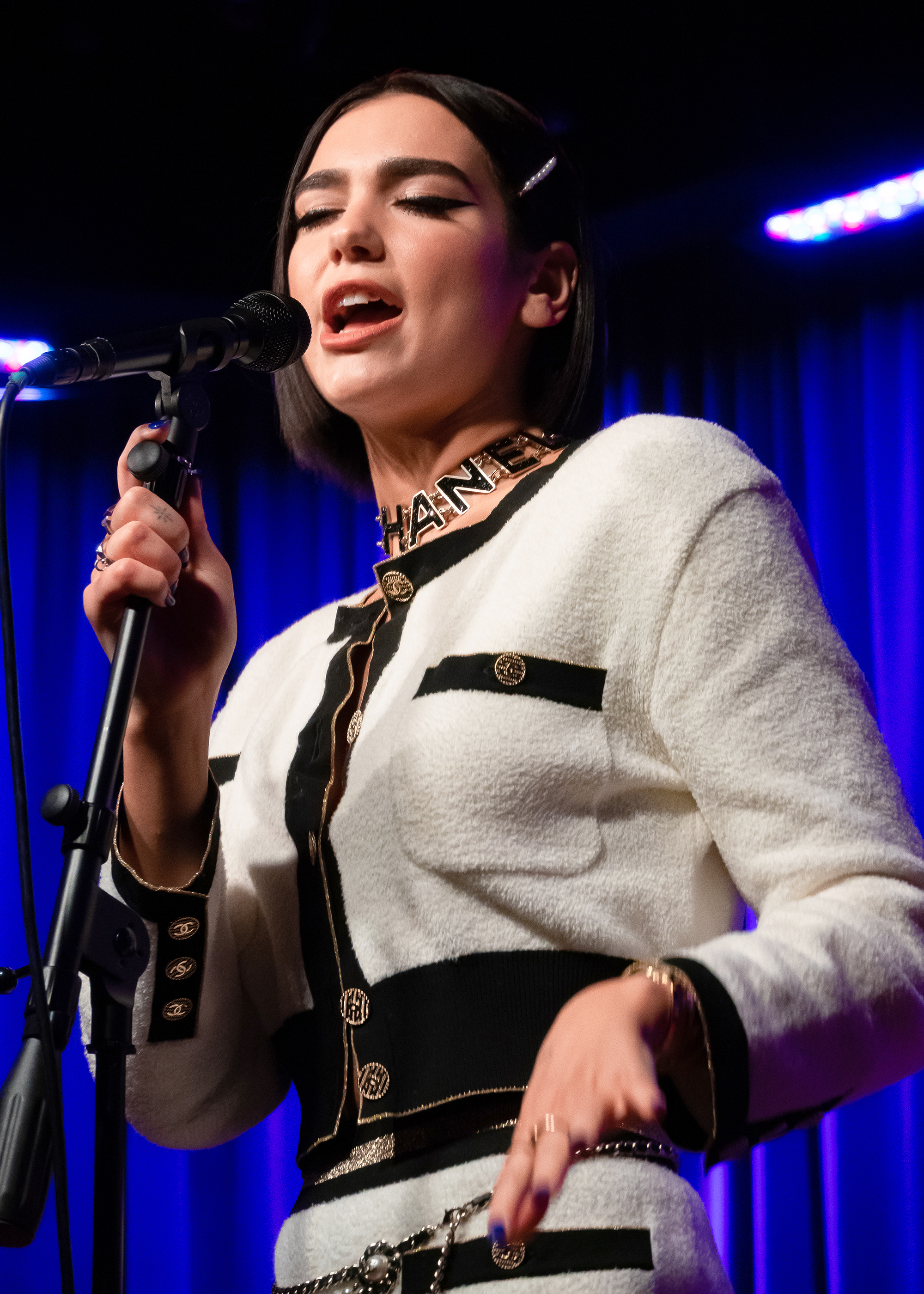
Dua Lipa's second studio album Future Nostalgia entered the chart in April 2020 at number two before climbing to the top spot the following week. The album spent 51 non-consecutive weeks in the top 10, including four non-consecutive weeks at number-one, and became the third best-selling album of 2020.

The UK Albums Chart is one of many music charts compiled by the Official Charts Company that calculates the best-selling albums of the week in the United Kingdom. Since 2004 the chart has been based on the sales of both physical albums and digital downloads. Since 2015, the album chart has been based on both sales and streaming. This list shows albums that peaked in the top ten of the UK Albums Chart during 2020, as well as albums which peaked in 2019 and 2021 but were in the top 10 in 2020. The entry date is when the album appeared in the top 10 for the first time (week ending, as published by the Official Charts Company, which is six days after the chart is announced).

One-hundred and ninety-eight albums were in the top ten this year. Thirteen albums from 2019 remained in the top ten for several weeks at the beginning of the year, while Post Human: Survival Horror by Bring Me the Horizon was released in 2020, but did not reach its peak until 2021. Fine Line by Harry Styles debuted in 2019 and re-entered the top 10 in 2020, but its peak position was not until 2021. Christmas by Michael Bublé was originally released in 2011, launched a new chart run in 2019, reaching a peak on its latest run in 2020 and again in 2021, when it returned to number-one. Heavy is the Head by Stormzy was the only album from 2019 to reach its peak in 2020. Little Mix scored the fastest-selling album of 2020 by a British act with Confetti. Thirteen albums from 2019 remained in the top ten for several weeks at the beginning of the year. Lil Uzi Vert was among the many artists who achieved their first top 10 album in 2020.

The first new number-one album of the year was Heavy Is the Head by Stormzy. Overall, forty-one different albums peaked at number-one so in 2020, with Taylor Swift (2) having the most albums hit that position.

== Background ==
=== Chart debuts ===
The following table (collapsed on desktop site) does not include acts who had previously charted as part of a group and secured their first top-ten solo album, or featured appearances on compilations or other artists recordings.

Artist	Number of top 10s	First entry	Chart position	Other entries
Selena Gomez	1	Rare	2	—
Easy Life	1	Junk Food	7	—
Sheku Kanneh-Mason	1	Elgar	8	—
Mac Miller	1	Circles	8	—
M Huncho	2	Huncholini the 1st	5	DNA (6)
New Hope Club	1	New Hope Club	5	—
Grimes	1	Miss Anthropocene	10	—
Lil Baby	1	My Turn	6	—
Lil Uzi Vert	1	Eternal Atake	3	—
Lauv	1	How I'm Feeling	9	—
The Slow Readers Club	1	The Joy of the Return	9	—
PartyNextDoor	1	Partymobile	7	—
Gerry Cinnamon	1	The Bonny	1	—
DaBaby	1	Blame It on Baby	8	—
Yussef Dayes	1	What Kinda Music	4	—
The D-Day Darlings	1	I'll Remember You	5	—
Kehlani	1	It Was Good Until It Wasn't	10	—
Polo G	1	The Goat	6	—
KSI	1	Dissimulation	2	—
Gunna	1	Wunna	5	—
Sports Team	1	Deep Down Happy	2	—
Phoebe Bridgers	1	Punisher	6	—
Khruangbin	1	Mordechai	7	—
Pop Smoke	1	Shoot for the Stars, Aim for the Moon	1	—
Bury Tomorrow	1	Cannibal	10	—
Juice Wrld	1	Legends Never Die	1	—
DMA's	1	The Glow	4	—
Massive Wagons	1	House of Noise	9	—
Creeper	1	Sex, Death & the Infinite Void	5	—
Glass Animals	1	Dreamland	2	—
Sea Girls	1	Open Up Your Head	3	—
Jamie Webster	1	We Get By	6	—
San Francisco Symphony	1	S&M2	2	—
Declan McKenna	1	Zeros	2	—
Ava Max	1	Heaven & Hell	2	—
Potter Payper	1	Training Day 3	3	—
Run the Jewels	1	RTJ4	9	—
Machine Gun Kelly	1	Tickets to My Downfall	3	—
Joji	1	Nectar	6	—
Blackpink	1	The Album	2	—
Amanda Holden	1	Songs from My Heart	4	—
21 Savage	1	Savage Mode II	10	—
Metro Boomin	1	Savage Mode II	10	—
Beabadoobee	1	Fake It Flowers	8	—
Nafe Smallz	1	DNA	6	—
Dutchavelli	1	Dutch from the 5th	8	—

Notes

Louis Tomlinson of the group One Direction reached the top 10 with his debut solo album this year, Walls. This added to his haul of five top 10 albums with One Direction to date, including four which had topped the chart.

=== Best-selling albums ===
For the second year in a row, Lewis Capaldi had the best-selling album of the year with Divinely Uninspired to a Hellish Extent. The album has now sold over 900,000 copies in the UK alone and has been certified 3× platinum by the BPI. Fine Line by Harry Styles came in second place. Dua Lipa's Future Nostalgia, When We Fall Asleep Where Do We Go by Billie Eilish and Stormzy's Heavy Is the Head made up the top five. Albums by Pop Smoke, Ed Sheeran, Queen, Elton John and Fleetwood Mac were also in the top ten best-selling albums of the year.

== Top-ten albums ==
Key

Symbol	Meaning
‡	Album peaked in 2019 but still in chart in 2020.
♦	Album released in 2019 or 2020 but peaked in 2021.
(#)	Year-end top ten album position and rank
Entered	The date that the album first appeared in the chart.
Peak	Highest position that the song reached in the UK Albums Chart.

Entered (week ending)	Weeks in top 10	Album	Artist	Peak	Peak reached (week ending)	Weeks at peak
Albums in 2019
14 March 2019	14	What a Time to Be Alive ‡	Tom Walker	1	14 March 2019	1
11 April 2019	50	When We All Fall Asleep, Where Do We Go? ‡ (#4)	Billie Eilish	1	11 April 2019	3
30 May 2019	85	Divinely Uninspired to a Hellish Extent ‡ (#1)	Lewis Capaldi	1	30 May 2019	10
25 July 2019	48	No.6 Collaborations Project ‡ (#7)	Ed Sheeran	1	25 July 2019	5
19 September 2019	13	Hollywood's Bleeding ‡	Post Malone	1	19 September 2019	1
14 November 2019	2	Kiwanuka ‡	Michael Kiwanuka	2	14 November 2019	1
21 November 2019	9	Back Together ‡	Michael Ball & Alfie Boe	2	21 November 2019	1
5 December 2019	7	Everyday Life ‡	Coldplay	1	5 December 2019	1
5 December 2019	5	The Christmas Present ‡	Robbie Williams	1	12 December 2019	1
5 December 2019	8	You're in My Heart: Rod Stewart with the Royal Philharmonic Orchestra ‡	Rod Stewart with the Royal Philharmonic Orchestra	1	19 December 2019	3
12 December 2019	9	Christmas ♦	Michael Bublé	1	7 January 2021	1
26 December 2019	15	Heavy Is the Head (#5)	Stormzy	1	16 January 2020	1
26 December 2019	57	Fine Line ♦ (#2)	Harry Styles	2	14 January 2021	1
Albums in 2020
9 January 2020	1	Street Trauma	D-Block Europe	9	9 January 2020	1
23 January 2020	1	Rare	Selena Gomez	2	23 January 2020	1
23 January 2020	1	Junk Food	Easy Life	7	23 January 2020	1
23 January 2020	1	Elgar	Sheku Kanneh-Mason	8	23 January 2020	1
30 January 2020	11	Music to Be Murdered By	Eminem	1	30 January 2020	1
30 January 2020	1	More. Again. Forever.	The Courteeners	2	30 January 2020	1
30 January 2020	1	Everything Else Has Gone Wrong	Bombay Bicycle Club	4	30 January 2020	1
30 January 2020	1	Manic	Halsey	6	30 January 2020	1
30 January 2020	1	Circles	Mac Miller	8	30 January 2020	1
6 February 2020	4	Big Conspiracy	J Hus	1	6 February 2020	1
6 February 2020	1	Hotspot	Pet Shop Boys	3	6 February 2020	1
6 February 2020	3	Huncholini the 1st	M Huncho	5	6 February 2020	1
6 February 2020	1	All the Hits	The Dave Clark Five	10	6 February 2020	1
13 February 2020	1	Foolish Loving Spaces	Blossoms	1	13 February 2020	1
13 February 2020	1	Walls	Louis Tomlinson	4	13 February 2020	1
20 February 2020	1	Father of All...	Green Day	1	20 February 2020	1
20 February 2020	1	No One Else Can Wear Your Crown	Oh Wonder	8	20 February 2020	1
27 February 2020	3	Changes	Justin Bieber	1	27 February 2020	1
27 February 2020	1	The Slow Rush	Tame Impala	3	27 February 2020	1
27 February 2020	1	New Hope Club	New Hope Club	5	27 February 2020	1
5 March 2020	2	Map of the Soul: 7	BTS	1	5 March 2020	1
5 March 2020	1	Ordinary Man	Ozzy Osbourne	3	5 March 2020	1
5 March 2020	1	Miss Anthropocene	Grimes	10	5 March 2020	1
12 March 2020	1	My Turn	Lil Baby	6	12 March 2020	1
12 March 2020	1	F8	Five Finger Death Punch	7	12 March 2020	1
19 March 2020	2	Manchester Calling	Paul Heaton & Jacqui Abbott	1	19 March 2020	1
19 March 2020	2	Eternal Atake	Lil Uzi Vert	3	19 March 2020	1
19 March 2020	1	City of Love	Deacon Blue	4	19 March 2020	1
19 March 2020	1	How I'm Feeling	Lauv	9	19 March 2020	1
26 March 2020	1	Heartbreak Weather	Niall Horan	1	26 March 2020	1
26 March 2020	1	Good Years	The Shires	3	26 March 2020	1
26 March 2020	1	Sad Happy	Circa Waves	4	26 March 2020	1
26 March 2020	1	Stranger in Paradise – The Lost New York	Matt Monro	8	26 March 2020	1
2 April 2020	7	After Hours	The Weeknd	1	2 April 2020	1
2 April 2020	1	I Am Not a Dog on a Chain	Morrissey	3	2 April 2020	1
2 April 2020	1	All the Hits & All New Love Songs	Kenny Rogers	6	2 April 2020	1
2 April 2020	1	The Joy of the Return	The Slow Readers Club	9	2 April 2020	1
2 April 2020	1	Is It Any Wonder? (EP)	David Bowie	10	2 April 2020	1
9 April 2020	1	Calm	5 Seconds of Summer	1	9 April 2020	1
9 April 2020	51	Future Nostalgia (#3)	Dua Lipa	1	16 April 2020	4
9 April 2020	2	Insomnia	Skepta, Chip & Young Adz	3	9 April 2020	1
9 April 2020	1	Gigaton	Pearl Jam	6	9 April 2020	1
9 April 2020	1	Partymobile	PartyNextDoor	7	9 April 2020	1
9 April 2020	13	Diamonds (#9)	Elton John	7	25 June 2020	1
16 April 2020	3	Greatest Hits (#8)	Queen	7	16 April 2020	1
16 April 2020	1	The Ultimate Collection	Bill Withers	10	16 April 2020	1
23 April 2020	2	The New Abnormal	The Strokes	3	23 April 2020	1
23 April 2020	1	The New Toronto 3	Tory Lanez	4	23 April 2020	1
30 April 2020	3	The Bonny	Gerry Cinnamon	1	30 April 2020	1
30 April 2020	1	Nothing Is True & Everything Is Possible	Enter Shikari	2	30 April 2020	1
30 April 2020	1	Blame It on Baby	DaBaby	8	30 April 2020	1
7 May 2020	1	What Kinda Music	Tom Misch & Yussef Dayes	4	7 May 2020	1
14 May 2020	3	Dark Lane Demo Tapes	Drake	1	14 May 2020	1
21 May 2020	1	Petals for Armor	Hayley Williams	4	21 May 2020	1
21 May 2020	1	I'll Remember You	The D-Day Darlings	5	21 May 2020	1
21 May 2020	1	It Was Good Until It Wasn't	Kehlani	10	21 May 2020	1
28 May 2020	1	High Off Life	Future	5	28 May 2020	1
28 May 2020	1	The Goat	Polo G	6	28 May 2020	1
28 May 2020	1	All That Glue	Sleaford Mods	10	28 May 2020	1
4 June 2020	2	Notes on a Conditional Form	The 1975	1	4 June 2020	1
4 June 2020	4	Dissimulation	KSI	2	4 June 2020	2
4 June 2020	1	Wunna	Gunna	5	4 June 2020	1
4 June 2020	1	D-2	Agust D	7	4 June 2020	1
11 June 2020	7	Chromatica	Lady Gaga	1	11 June 2020	2
11 June 2020	1	Golden Hour	Kygo	6	11 June 2020	1
11 June 2020	1	Polaris (EP)	Aitch	7	11 June 2020	1
11 June 2020	7	50 Years – Don't Stop (#10)	Fleetwood Mac	9	25 June 2020	3
18 June 2020	1	Deep Down Happy	Sports Team	2	18 June 2020	1
18 June 2020	1	Wake Up, Sunshine	All Time Low	3	18 June 2020	1
25 June 2020	2	MTV Unplugged (Live at Hull City Hall)	Liam Gallagher	1	25 June 2020	1
25 June 2020	1	Love, Death & Dancing	Jack Garratt	8	25 June 2020	1
2 July 2020	4	Rough and Rowdy Ways	Bob Dylan	1	2 July 2020	1
2 July 2020	1	Homegrown	Neil Young	2	2 July 2020	1
2 July 2020	1	Punisher	Phoebe Bridgers	6	2 July 2020	1
2 July 2020	3	Legend	Bob Marley and the Wailers	9	6 August 2020	1
9 July 2020	1	Women in Music Pt. III	Haim	1	9 July 2020	1
9 July 2020	3	What's Your Pleasure?	Jessie Ware	3	9 July 2020	1
9 July 2020	1	Mordechai	Khruangbin	7	9 July 2020	1
16 July 2020	2	On Sunset	Paul Weller	1	16 July 2020	1
16 July 2020	34	Shoot for the Stars, Aim for the Moon (#6)	Pop Smoke	1	1 October 2020	1
16 July 2020	1	Cinema Paradiso	Katherine Jenkins	3	16 July 2020	1
16 July 2020	1	A Steady Drip, Drip, Drip	Sparks	7	16 July 2020	1
16 July 2020	1	Cannibal	Bury Tomorrow	10	16 July 2020	1
23 July 2020	13	Legends Never Die	Juice Wrld	1	23 July 2020	1
23 July 2020	1	None of Us Are Getting Out of This Life Alive	The Streets	2	23 July 2020	1
23 July 2020	1	The Glow	DMA's	4	23 July 2020	1
23 July 2020	1	Song for Our Daughter	Laura Marling	6	23 July 2020	1
30 July 2020	1	Brightest Blue	Ellie Goulding	1	30 July 2020	1
30 July 2020	1	Gaslighter	The Chicks	5	30 July 2020	1
30 July 2020	1	Closer	Joy Division	6	30 July 2020	1
30 July 2020	1	Lianne La Havas	Lianne La Havas	7	30 July 2020	1
30 July 2020	1	House of Noise	Massive Wagons	9	30 July 2020	1
6 August 2020	10	Folklore	Taylor Swift	1	6 August 2020	3
6 August 2020	2	Twenty Twenty	Ronan Keating	2	6 August 2020	1
6 August 2020	1	All Distortions Are Intentional	Neck Deep	4	6 August 2020	1
13 August 2020	1	A Hero's Death	Fontaines D.C.	2	13 August 2020	1
13 August 2020	1	Sex, Death & the Infinite Void	Creeper	5	13 August 2020	1
13 August 2020	1	Such Pretty Forks in the Road	Alanis Morissette	8	13 August 2020	1
20 August 2020	1	Dreamland	Glass Animals	2	20 August 2020	1
20 August 2020	1	Whoosh!	Deep Purple	4	20 August 2020	1
27 August 2020	2	A Celebration of Endings	Biffy Clyro	1	27 August 2020	1
27 August 2020	1	Open Up Your Head	Sea Girls	3	27 August 2020	1
27 August 2020	1	Even in Exile	James Dean Bradfield	6	27 August 2020	1
27 August 2020	1	Peace	Levellers	8	27 August 2020	1
3 September 2020	2	Imploding the Mirage	The Killers	1	3 September 2020	1
3 September 2020	1	Neon	Erasure	4	3 September 2020	1
3 September 2020	1	We Get By	Jamie Webster	6	3 September 2020	1
10 September 2020	3	Crabs in a Bucket	Nines	1	10 September 2020	1
10 September 2020	1	S&M2	Metallica & the San Francisco Symphony	2	10 September 2020	1
10 September 2020	2	All Rise	Gregory Porter	3	10 September 2020	1
10 September 2020	1	Energy	Disclosure	4	10 September 2020	1
10 September 2020	1	Smile	Katy Perry	5	10 September 2020	1
17 September 2020	1	Goats Head Soup	The Rolling Stones	1	17 September 2020	1
17 September 2020	1	Zeros	Declan McKenna	2	17 September 2020	1
24 September 2020	1	The Universal Want	Doves	1	24 September 2020	1
24 September 2020	1	Re-Animator	Everything Everything	5	24 September 2020	1
24 September 2020	1	We Are Chaos	Marilyn Manson	7	24 September 2020	1
1 October 2020	1	Heaven & Hell	Ava Max	2	1 October 2020	1
1 October 2020	1	Training Day 3	Potter Payper	3	1 October 2020	1
1 October 2020	1	Tea for the Tillerman²	Cat Stevens	4	1 October 2020	1
1 October 2020	1	Live at the Roundhouse	Nick Mason's Saucerful of Secrets	5	1 October 2020	1
1 October 2020	1	RTJ4	Run the Jewels	9	1 October 2020	1
8 October 2020	1	Ultra Mono	Idles	1	8 October 2020	1
8 October 2020	1	Tickets to My Downfall	Machine Gun Kelly	3	8 October 2020	1
8 October 2020	1	Ohms	Deftones	5	8 October 2020	1
8 October 2020	1	Nectar	Joji	6	8 October 2020	1
8 October 2020	1	Sign o' the Times	Prince	7	8 October 2020	1
8 October 2020	1	Cum on Feel the Hitz – The Best of	Slade	8	8 October 2020	1
15 October 2020	2	Live Around the World	Queen + Adam Lambert	1	15 October 2020	1
15 October 2020	1	The Album	Blackpink	2	15 October 2020	1
15 October 2020	1	(What's the Story) Morning Glory?	Oasis	3	15 October 2020	1
15 October 2020	2	Songs from My Heart	Amanda Holden	4	15 October 2020	1
15 October 2020	1	2020	Bon Jovi	5	15 October 2020	1
15 October 2020	1	Melanie C	Melanie C	8	15 October 2020	1
15 October 2020	1	Us + Them	Roger Waters	9	15 October 2020	1
15 October 2020	1	Savage Mode II	21 Savage & Metro Boomin	10	15 October 2020	1
22 October 2020	2	Edna	Headie One	1	22 October 2020	1
22 October 2020	2	The Blue Print: Us vs. Them	D-Block Europe	2	22 October 2020	1
22 October 2020	1	Gimme Some Truth. The Ultimate Mixes	John Lennon	3	22 October 2020	1
22 October 2020	1	10 Songs	Travis	5	22 October 2020	1
22 October 2020	1	The Studio Albums 1978-1991	Dire Straits	9	22 October 2020	1
29 October 2020	1	Cherry Blossom	The Vamps	1	29 October 2020	1
29 October 2020	1	Daniel	Daniel O'Donnell	3	29 October 2020	1
29 October 2020	1	Album No. 8	Katie Melua	7	29 October 2020	1
29 October 2020	1	Fake It Flowers	Beabadoobee	8	29 October 2020	1
5 November 2020	3	Letter to You	Bruce Springsteen	1	5 November 2020	1
5 November 2020	1	Song Machine, Season One: Strange Timez	Gorillaz	2	5 November 2020	1
5 November 2020	1	Moral Panic	Nothing but Thieves	3	5 November 2020	1
5 November 2020	1	In Isolation/Live from the Plaza Theatre, Stockport	Blossoms	5	5 November 2020	1
5 November 2020	1	All Blessed	Faithless	6	5 November 2020	1
5 November 2020	1	Royal Tea	Joe Bonamassa	7	5 November 2020	1
5 November 2020	1	20	Russell Watson	10	5 November 2020	1
12 November 2020	5	Positions	Ariana Grande	1	12 November 2020	1
12 November 2020	4	Love Goes	Sam Smith	2	12 November 2020	1
12 November 2020	2	Music... The Air That I Breathe	Cliff Richard	3	12 November 2020	1
12 November 2020	2	Post Human: Survival Horror ♦	Bring Me the Horizon	1	4 February 2021	1
12 November 2020	1	DNA	M Huncho & Nafe Smallz	6	12 November 2020	1
12 November 2020	1	Long Hot Summers – The Story of The Style Council	The Style Council	8	12 November 2020	1
12 November 2020	1	The Human Demands	Amy Macdonald	10	12 November 2020	1
19 November 2020	5	Disco	Kylie Minogue	1	19 November 2020	1
19 November 2020	11	Confetti	Little Mix	2	19 November 2020	1
19 November 2020	1	I Owe It All to You	Shirley Bassey	5	19 November 2020	1
19 November 2020	1	Dutch from the 5th	Dutchavelli	8	19 November 2020	1
26 November 2020	5	Power Up	AC/DC	1	26 November 2020	1
26 November 2020	1	Young Dumb Thrills	McFly	2	26 November 2020	1
26 November 2020	5	Believe	Andrea Bocelli	3	26 November 2020	1
26 November 2020	1	Infinite Things	Paloma Faith	4	26 November 2020	1
26 November 2020	5	Jolly Holiday	Andre Rieu & the Johann Strauss Orchestra	4	24 December 2020	1
26 November 2020	1	Songs from the Kitchen Disco	Sophie Ellis-Bextor	8	26 November 2020	1
26 November 2020	3	Johnny Cash and the Royal Philharmonic Orchestra	Johnny Cash & the Royal Philharmonic Orchestra	8	24 December 2020	1
3 December 2020	5	Together at Christmas	Michael Ball & Alfie Boe	1	3 December 2020	1
3 December 2020	1	Be	BTS	2	3 December 2020	1
3 December 2020	5	Classic Diamonds	Neil Diamond & the London Symphony Orchestra	2	24 December 2020	1
3 December 2020	1	Nights of the Dead – Legacy of the Beast	Iron Maiden	7	3 December 2020	1
10 December 2020	4	Music Played by Humans	Gary Barlow	1	10 December 2020	1
10 December 2020	1	What the Future Holds	Steps	2	10 December 2020	1
10 December 2020	1	Plastic Hearts	Miley Cyrus	4	10 December 2020	1
10 December 2020	1	Singled Out	Shakin' Stevens	10	10 December 2020	1
17 December 2020	2	Weird!	Yungblud	1	17 December 2020	1
17 December 2020	1	Live at the Royal Albert Hall	Arctic Monkeys	3	17 December 2020	1
17 December 2020	1	Don't Let the Devil Take Another Day	Kelly Jones	8	17 December 2020	1
24 December 2020	9	Evermore	Taylor Swift	1	24 December 2020	2
31 December 2020	1	McCartney III	Paul McCartney	1	31 December 2020	1

== Entries by artist ==
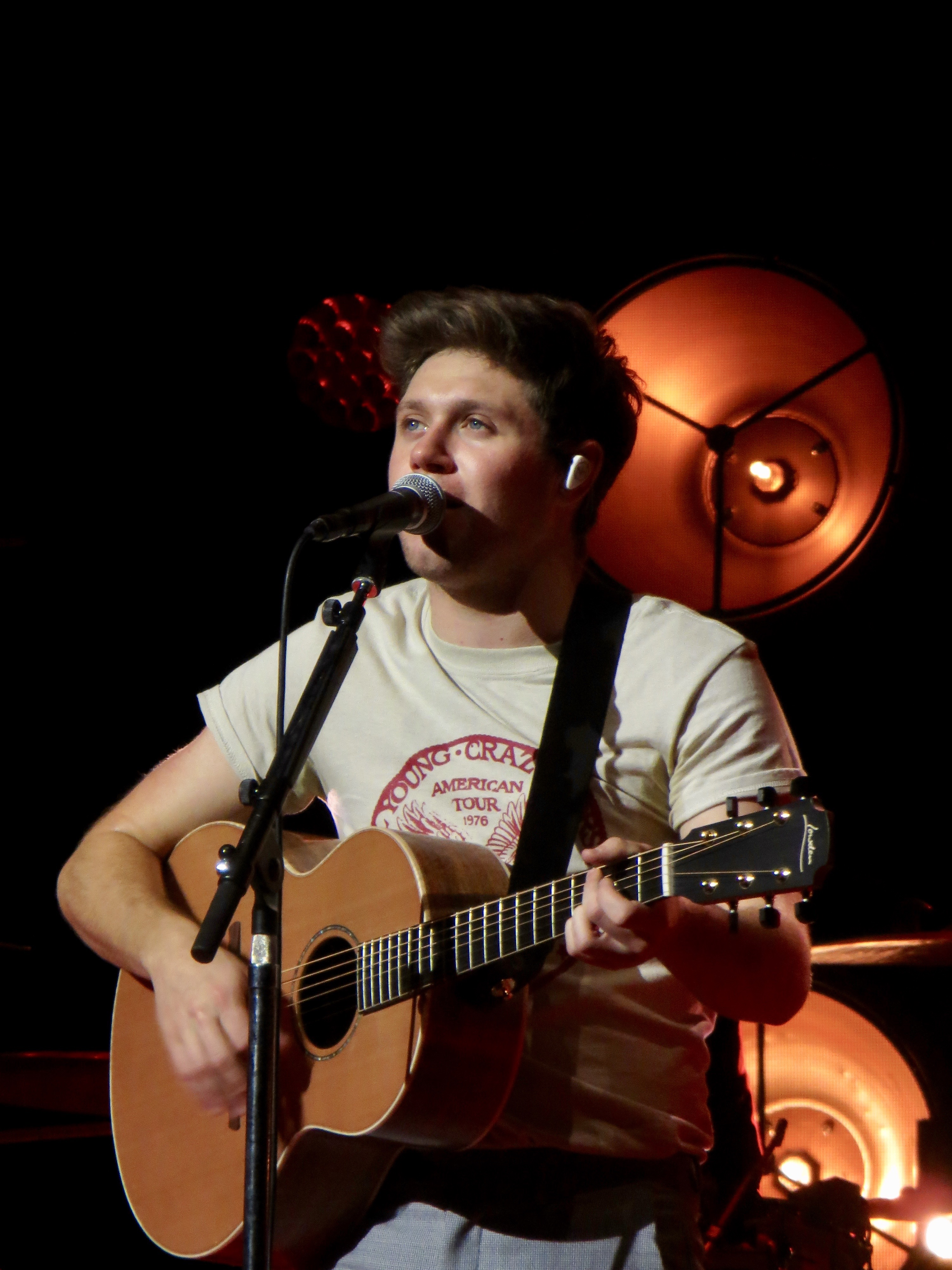
Irish singer-songwriter and former One Direction member Niall Horan reached number-one in the UK Albums Chart in March of this year with his second studio album Heartbreak Weather.

The following table shows artists who have achieved two or more top 10 entries in 2020, including albums that reached their peak in 2019. The figures only include main artists, with featured artists and appearances on compilation albums not counted individually for each artist. The total number of weeks an artist spent in the top ten in 2020 is also shown.

Entries	Artist	Weeks	Albums
2	BTS	3	Map of the Soul: 7, Be
2	Taylor Swift	12	Folklore, Evermore
2	Alfie Boe	8	Back Together,Together at Christmas
2	Blossoms	3	Foolish Loving Spaces,In Isolation/Live from the Plaza Theatre, Stockport
2	D-Block Europe	3	Street Trauma,The Blue Print: Us vs. Them
2	Liam Gallagher	3	MTV Unplugged (Live at Hull City Hall),(What's the Story) Morning Glory?
2	Michael Ball	8	Back Together,Together at Christmas
2	Queen	5	Greatest Hits, Live Around the World
2	Royal Philharmonic Orchestra	7	You're in My Heart: Rod Stewart with the Royal Philharmonic Orchestra, Johnny Cash with the Royal Philharmonic Orchestra

== See also ==
- List of UK Albums Chart number ones of the 2020s
