= Kyle Stemberger =

American record producer

- Born: February 15, 2000 (age 26); Griffin, Georgia
- Genre: Hip hop • rap • R&B • pop music
- Occupation: Record producer
- Instruments: FL Studio: Piano; Guitar
- Years active: 2018-present
- Label: Prescription Songs

Kyle Stemberger (born February 15, 2000, in Griffin, Georgia) is an American record producer currently based in Los Angeles, California. Stemberger has worked with numerous artists and musicians, including Lil Wayne, Jorja Smith, Bad Bunny, Lil Baby, and Trippie Redd.

== Early life ==
Stemberger was born and raised in Griffin, Georgia. At the age of 6, he began practicing playing the piano and later learned to play the guitar. He claims to have developed absolute pitch (perfect pitch) in an early age, which is a rare ability of a person to identify or re-create a given musical note without the benefit of a reference tone. Stemberger began to focus on producing when he was in middle school, and he cites Metro Boomin and Zaytoven as influences. After gaining interest in hip hop music, he downloaded a demo version of FL Studio, a digital audio workstation, and began creating beats of his own.

== Career ==
In 2018, Stemberger began producing for artists and pursuing his passion for music full time. Collaborators include rapper/singers Trippie Redd, Jorja Smith, Flipp Dinero, Southside and KBeaZy. Stemberger has also been working with rising acts such as Kaleb Mitchell, WHATUPRG (Reach Records) and Nafe Smallz. In 2020, Stemberger signed a publishing deal with Prescription Songs, a music publishing company founded by Dr. Luke which resulted in him relocating to Los Angeles. In the same year, Stemberger collaborated with singer Bad Bunny for Las que no iban a salir which peaked at No. 1 on the US Billboard Top Latin Albums.

== Notable credits ==
Year	Title	Artist	Album	Role
2017	Goat	Adrian Stresow	At Least I Tried	Producer
2019	Riot	Trippie Redd	!	Composer, Producer
2019	How I Move	Flipp Dinero (feat. Lil Baby)	Love For Guala	Producer
2019	Throwin Salt	Money Man	Paranoia	Producer
2019	Timeless	9lokkNine (feat. Bangout, RugRat OD)	Mind Of Destruction	Producer
2019	Gunna Swag	Southside	Pre-game	Producer
2019	Be Honest	Jorja Smith (feat. Burna Boy)	Non-album single	Producer
2019	No Friends	TeeJay3k (feat. Quando Rando)	Soul Searchin	Producer
2019	Bad To The Bone	Nafe Smallz	Good Love	Producer
2020	Indulge	M Huncho	Huncholini The 1st	Composer, Producer
2020	Ronca Freestyle	Bad Bunny	Las que no iban a salir	Co-producer
2020	Triple Science	Headie One	EDNA	Producer
2020	Snitch	Joyner Lucas	Evolution	Producer
2020	Playoff	Lil Wayne (feat. Poppy H)	Non-album single	Producer
2021	BDay	Tory Lanez	We Outside	Producer
