= DBE World =

Mixtape by D-Block Europe
- Released: 7 July 2023
- Studio: IBØ Studio (Paris)
- Length: 74:54
- Label: D-Block; EGA Records; UMG
- Producer: Ambezza; Da Beatfreakz; Brian Spirit; Dirtbike LB; EB; Eight8; Einer Bankz; Ghost Killer Track; Harry Beech; Jony Beats; Nathaniel London; Ninez; R14 Beats; Rymez; Sean Murdz; Sheffmade; SKOBeats; SRNO

D-Block Europe chronology
| Lap 5 (2022) | DBE World (2023) | Rolling Stone (2024) |

Singles from DBE World
- 1. "Side Effects" Released: 15 June 2023; 2. "Pakistan" Released: 29 June 2023; 3. "Potential" Released: 6 July 2023

DBE World is the sixth full-length studio mixtape by British hip hop collective D-Block Europe (consisting of Young Adz and Dirtbike LB), released through EGA Records and UMG on 7 July 2023. The album is a follow-up to their second full-length studio album, Lap 5 in September 2022. The mixtape features guest appearances from Aitch, Chip, Clavish, Headie One, K-Trap, M Huncho, Nafe Smallz, and OhGeesy, alongside production from Da Beatfreakz, Dirtbike LB, Eight8, Einer Bankz, Ghost Killer Track, Nathaniel London, alongside several other producers.

== Background ==
The mixtape's rollout began in early 2023 as they released several loose singles prior to the release of the mixtape, such as "Tears in My Amiri's", "Barbie", and "1 on 1" before releasing the album's lead single, "Side Effects" on 15 June 2023. One week prior to the release of the album, D-Block Europe released the second single from their mixtape, the highly anticipated, "Pakistan" featuring Clavish, while also announcing the album. The mixtape's final single, "Potential" was released on 6 July 2023, one day prior to the release of the mixtape.

== Critical reception ==
Professional ratings
Review scores
| Source | Rating |
|---|---|
| Clash | 7/10 |

DBE World received positive reviews from critics. Writing for Clash, Shanté Collier-McDermott wrote that "D-Block Europe cement themselves within the top tier of the UK Rap scene on DBE World, deserving of their flowers as trap trailblazers", and that "this mixtape celebrates the life they worked hard for as they welcome peace not problems… and of course, it is not void of the spicy content fans love".

== Track listing ==
DBE World track listing
| No. | Title | Writer(s) | Producer(s) | Length |
|---|---|---|---|---|
| 1. | "Intro (Charges)" | Adam Williams; Ricky Banton | Rymez | 3:22 |
| 2. | "Side Effects" | Williams; Banton | Ninez | 3:01 |
| 3. | "Hush Lil Baby" | Williams; Banton | Ghost Killer Track | 2:36 |
| 4. | "Kettle Blue" | Williams; Banton | R14 Beats; Eight8 | 2:41 |
| 5. | "No More This Time" (with Chip) | Williams; Banton; Jahmaal Fyffe | | 2:35 |
| 6. | "Potential" | Williams; Banton | Eight8; Harry Beech; Sean Murdz | 2:41 |
| 7. | "4 And A Baby" | Williams; Banton | Nathaniel London; SKOBeats | 2:58 |
| 8. | "Keith Lemon" | Williams; Banton | | 2:30 |
| 9. | "NPC's (IPP)" | Williams; Banton | | 2:55 |
| 10. | "Operation Fortress" (with Headie One) | Williams; Banton; Irving Adjei | Ninez | 3:58 |
| 11. | "Pirelli" | Williams; Banton | Brian Spirit | 3:03 |
| 12. | "Navy Seal" (with Nafe Smallz) | Williams; Banton; Nathan Adams | Ninez | 4:27 |
| 13. | "Crying In Chanel" (with Young Adz) | Williams | Eight8; Harry Beech | 2:56 |
| 14. | "Lottery Love" | Williams; Banton | Dirtbike LB | 2:58 |
| 15. | "Tennis" (with OhGeesy) | Williams; Banton; Alejandro Carranza | Eight8; Jony Beats | 2:34 |
| 16. | "Forrest" (with Dirtbike LB) | Banton | SRNO | 2:06 |
| 17. | "Domino's In Order (Interlude)" | Williams; Banton | EB | 1:55 |
| 18. | "She Like Me" (with Aitch) | Williams; Banton; Harrison Armstrong | Ninez | 4:23 |
| 19. | "Pakistan" (with Clavish) | Williams; Banton; Cian Wright | Da Beatfreakz | 2:55 |
| 20. | "Drums On Safe" | Williams; Banton | Dirtbike LB | 3:12 |
| 21. | "Styrofoam" (with K-Trap) | Williams; Banton; Patrick Brew | Einer Bankz; Sheffmade | 4:13 |
| 22. | "Right By The Sink" (with M Huncho) | Williams; Banton; M Huncho | | 4:23 |
| 23. | "Submarine" | Williams; Banton | Ambezza | 2:55 |
| 24. | "Obsessed" | Williams; Banton | Dirtbike LB | 2:57 |
| Total length: | | | | 74:54 |

== Charts ==
Chart performance for DBE World
| Chart (2023) | Peak position |
|---|---|
| Irish Albums (OCC) | 58 |
| UK Albums (OCC) | 6 |
| UK R&B Albums (OCC) | 2 |

== Certifications ==
| Region | Certification | Certified units/sales |
|---|---|---|
| United Kingdom (BPI) | Silver | 60,000^{‡} |
^{‡} Sales+streaming figures based on certification alone.
