= Top Boy (A Selection of Music Inspired by the Series) =

Soundtrack album by Various artists
- Released: 13 September 2019
- Genre: British hip hop; grime
- Length: 52:40
- Label: OVO Sound; Warner

Singles from Top Boy (A Selection of Music Inspired by the Series)
- 1. "Behind Barz" Released: 7 July 2018; 2. "Professor X" Released: 10 November 2019

Top Boy (A Selection of Music Inspired by the Series) is an original soundtrack album for the British television series Top Boy. It was released digitally on 13 September 2019 by OVO Sound and Warner. The soundtrack includes appearances from OVO's Drake, Baka Not Nice, and Popcaan and British artists AJ Tracey, Avelino, Dave, Fredo, Ghetts, Headie One, Little Simz, M Huncho, Nafe Smallz and SL.

== Background ==
In November 2017, it was announced that Netflix would revive the television series, with season 3 executive produced by Drake's DreamCrew. On 7 July 2018, Drake appeared on Link Up TV's segment "Behind Barz", releasing a freestyle. On 10 November 2019, Dave released the official music video for "Professor X", directed by Nathan James Tettey.

(In September 2023, Brian Eno released Top Boy (Score from the Original Series) with ambient, instrumental music.)

== Track listing ==
Credits adopted from AllMusic.

No.	Title	Writer(s)	Producer(s)	Length
1.	"Riding on E" (performed by Nafe Smallz)	Nathan Adams	NIKUL; Jay Da Engineer	2:35
2.	"Freddy" (performed by Fredo)	Marvin William Bailey	Mason Taylor	2:17
3.	"Hard to Believe" (performed by Headie One)	Irving Adjei; Jordan Henry	Sykes Beats	3:18
4.	"My Town" (performed by Baka Not Nice featuring Giggs)	Darren Fraser; Kashief "K. Forest" Hanson; Travis Savoury; Noah Shebib; Nathaniel Thompson	40; K. Forest; dF	3:18
5.	"One Summer" (performed by M Huncho)	Quincy Ferreira, Mujtaba khan	Quincy Tellem	3:24
6.	"Overseer" (performed by Youngs Teflon)	Eyobed Getachew; Ariowa Irosogie	E.Y; Ari PenSmith	2:18
7.	"Professor X" (performed by Dave)	David Omoregie	Dave	3:37
8.	"100 Thoughts" (performed by SL)	Ben Ash; Noah Beresin; Harlee Milne	Facer; HEAVENINSTEREO; Noah Breakfast; Two Inch Punch	2:03
9.	"Billions" (performed by Popcaan featuring Quada)	Shacquelle Clarke; Andrae Sutherland	KaleX; Jelly Records	2:40
10.	"Elastic" (performed by AJ Tracey)	Che Wolton Grant	TobiShyBoy	3:17
11.	"Listen" (performed by Ghetts)	Justin Clarke; Karl Joseph	Sir Spyro	3:27
12.	"Belly of the Beast" (performed by Avelino)	Achi Avelino; Kyle Evans	Kyle Evans	2:58
13.	"Venom" (performed by Little Simz)	Simbiatu Ajikawo; Stephen Bruner; Dean Josiah Cover; Charles Dickerson	Inflo	2:34
14.	"Feeling It" (performed by Teeway)	Berkley Ehheosa Ayemere	Mokuba Lives	3:06
15.	"8 Missed Calls" (performed by Nafe Smallz)	Nathan Adams	Sean Murdz	3:41
16.	"God's Eye" (performed by Dave)	Omoregie	Dave	5:16
17.	"Behind Barz" (performed by Drake)	Aubrey Graham	Richie Beatz	2:43
Total length:				52:40

== Certifications ==
Region	Certification	Certified units/sales
United Kingdom (BPI)	Silver	60,000^{‡}
^{‡} Sales+streaming figures based on certification alone.
