= Fantasy (D-Block Europe song) =

2022 song by D-Block Europe

Single by D-Block Europe

from the album Lap 5
- Released: 21 July 2022
- Length: 2:37
- Label: D-Block Europe; D-Block Records; UMG
- Songwriters: Adam Nathaniel "Young Adz" Williams; Ricky Earl "Dirtbike LB" Banton

D-Block Europe singles chronology
"Elegant & Gang" (2022)	"Fantasy" (2022)	"Man in the Mirror" (2022)

Music video
- "Fantasy" on YouTube

"Fantasy" is a song by British hip hop collective, D-Block Europe. It was released on 21 July 2022, as the third single from DBE's sophomore studio album Lap 5. The song was mixed, mastered, and recorded in France by French engineer, IBØ and DBE's go-to producer, Prince Galalie.

== Critical reception ==
Writing for NME, in a review, Kyann-Sian Williams noted that the track has an "afroswing sound" which "isn’t DBE’s signature sound." He continued to note that the track "has a bland beat to rap over," however, the "lyrics are endearing." He states that Young Adz' "comical wit keeps the interest."

== Music video ==
The William Thomas-directed music video is seen to be filmed in Paris and shows both artists "daydreaming about their ideal worlds."

== Personnel ==
Credits and personnel adapted from Tidal.

Musicians

- Adam Nathaniel "Young Adz" Williams – lead artist, songwriter, composer
- Ricky Earl "Dirtbike LB" Banton – lead artist, songwriter, composer

Technical

- IBØ – recording engineer
- IBØ – mastering engineer
- Prince Galalie – mixing engineer

== Charts ==
Chart performance for "Fantasy"
Chart (2022)	Peak position
UK Singles (OCC)	49
