= Adolescence (mixtape) =

Mixtape by Unknown T
- Released: 30 July 2021
- Recorded: 2020
- Genre: British hip hop; UK drill
- Length: 41:12
- Label: A Stay Solid Music; Island

Unknown T chronology
Rise Above Hate (2020)	Adolescence (2021)

Singles from Adolescence
- 1. "WW2" Released: 7 January 2021; 2. "Wonderland" Released: 10 June 2021; 3. "Goodums" Released: 25 June 2021; 4. "Driller sh!t" Released: 15 July 2021; 5. "Tugman Vacation" Released: 8 August 2021

Adolescence is the second commercial mixtape by British rapper Unknown T. It was released on 30 July 2021 by A Stay Solid Music and Island. It includes guest features from Digga D, M1llionz, Potter Payper, and Nafe Smallz.

== Singles and promotion ==
On 7 January 2021, Unknown T released the single "WW2". On 10 June, the second single "Wonderland" featuring M Huncho was released. On 25 June, he released the third single "Goodums". The release date and title of the mixtape were also announced on 25 June. On 15 July, he released the fourth single "Driller sh!t".

On 5 July 2021, Unknown T unveiled a collaboration with Billionaire Boys Club and PLACES+FACES for his merchandise clothing.

== Critical reception ==
Writing for Clash, Ramy Abou-Setta said "The 15 song tape consists primarily of drill anthems and pleasantries for his targeted audience; he focuses on making his name known, becoming ever-cemented as one of the smoothest drill artists to ever grace the microphone. [...] All of the songs that are featured on the mixtape seem to mesh into one sphere of drill, leaving a desire for a more attention-grabbing track that allows for us to get to see a different side of Unknown T." The writer also said that the mixtape is good enough to cement Unknown T in the UK music scene, and "provides some necessary innovation on to a saturated musical space."

== Commercial performance ==
Upon the mixtape's release, Adolescence debuted at number 8 on the UK Albums Chart with approximately 4,000 equivalent sales first week.

== Track listing ==
Adolescence track listing
No.	Title	Producer(s)	Length
1.	"22 double 0"	Chris Rich	2:14
2.	"Driller sh!t"	Byrd; AXL Beats	3:05
3.	"Trenches" (featuring Potter Payper)	Sean Murdz	3:53
4.	"WW2"	AV The Producer; X10; R14 Beats	3:21
5.	"EAST"	GOTCHA; R14 Beats	2:53
6.	"VIN DIESEL" (featuring M1llionz)	Ghosty	3:07
7.	"Sweet Lies"	Sean D; AoD	2:37
8.	"Tugman Vacation"	R14 Beats; Remedee	2:55
9.	"Goodums"	Miink	3:15
10.	"Grandma Prayer"		0:32
11.	"Bible Love"	Chris Rich	1:48
12.	"No Forgiveness" (featuring Nafe Smallz)	Sean Murdz	2:44
13.	"Wonderland" (featuring M Huncho)	Cage Beats; R14 Beats; Jony Beats	3:05
14.	"Louis Bloom"	Trinz	2:36
15.	"GLEE" (featuring Digga D)	N1; R14 Beats	2:58
Total length:			41:12

== Charts ==
Chart performance for Adolescence
Chart (2021)	Peak position
UK Albums (OCC)	8
