= Make You Smile =

2021 song by D-Block Europe

Single by D-Block Europe featuring AJ Tracey

from the album Home Alone 2
- Released: 19 November 2021
- Length: 2:59
- Label: D-Block Europe; D-Block Records; UMG
- Songwriters: Adam Nathaniel "Young Adz" Williams; Ricky Earl "Dirtbike LB" Banton; Ché Wolton Grant
- Producers: Boumidjal; HoloMobb

D-Block Europe singles chronology
| "Overseas" (2021) | "Make You Smile" (2021) | "Black Beatles" (2022) |

AJ Tracey singles chronology
| "Roadside" (2021) | "Make You Smile" (2021) | "FYN" (2022) |

Music video
- "Make You Smile" on YouTube

"Make You Smile" is a song by British hip hop collective, D-Block Europe featuring British rapper, AJ Tracey. It was released on 19 November 2021, as the fourth single from DBE's fifth mixtape, Home Alone 2. The song was mixed, mastered, and recorded in France by French engineer, IBØ and DBE's go-to producer, Prince Galalie.

== Composition ==
GRM Daily's Courtney Wynter describes the song as "uplifting" and notes that the three "exchange melodies to speak on the love they have for the ladies in their life."

== Music video ==
The William Thomas-directed music video was released on 10 February 2022, months after the track's release and is seen to be filmed overseas. It "mirror[s] the spirited energy the track holds" and sees the three artists "enjoying themselves in a sunny destination overseas."

== Personnel ==
Credits and personnel adapted from Tidal.

Musicians

- Adam Nathaniel "Young Adz" Williams – lead artist, songwriter, composer
- Ricky Earl "Dirtbike LB" Banton – lead artist, songwriter, composer
- Ché Wolton "AJ Tracey" Grant – featured artist, songwriter, composer

Technical

- IBØ – recording engineer
- IBØ – mastering engineer
- Prince Galalie – mixing engineer

== Charts ==
Chart performance for "Make You Smile"
| Chart (2021) | Peak position |
|---|---|
| Ireland (IRMA) | 48 |
| UK Singles (OCC) | 15 |
| UK Hip Hop/R&B (OCC) | 21 |

== Certifications ==
Certifications for "Make You Smile"
| Region | Certification | Certified units/sales |
|---|---|---|
| United Kingdom (BPI) | Platinum | 600,000^{‡} |
^{‡} Sales+streaming figures based on certification alone.
