= Don't Rush (Young T & Bugsey song) =

2019 single by Young T & Bugsey

Single by Young T & Bugsey featuring Headie One

from the album Plead the 5th
- Released: 9 November 2019; 15 April 2020 (United States)
- Genre: Afroswing
- Length: 3:27
- Label: Black Butter
- Songwriters: Irving Adjei; Doyin Julius; Rashard Tucker
- Producer: Grades

Young T & Bugsey singles chronology
"Strike a Pose" (2019)	"Don't Rush" (2019)	"Throw Me a Text" (2020)

Headie One singles chronology
"Both" (2019)	"Don't Rush" (2019)	"Charades" (2020)

Music video
- "Don't Rush" on YouTube

"Don't Rush" is a song by British rap duo Young T & Bugsey featuring British rapper Headie One. The track was released on 9 November 2019 as the second single from the duo's debut mixtape Plead the 5th (2020). The song was written by Young T & Bugsey and Headie One, and produced by Grades. The song was a commercial success, peaking within the top 20 of the UK Singles Chart, and received a nomination for the Brit Award for Song of the Year in 2021.

== Music video ==
The music video premiered on YouTube on 7 November 2019. It was directed by KLVDR and produced by Pulse Films. As of March 2021, the video had surpassed 70 million views on YouTube.

== Commercial performance ==
In June 2020, the track was certified as Gold by the British Phonographic Industry for exceeding chart sales of 400,000.

== TikTok challenge ==
The "Don't Rush" challenge went viral on TikTok in April 2020, with over 79,000 videos created as of 16 April 2020. The challenge, also known as the #DontRushChallenge, involves people recording themselves in lounge attire, obscuring the screen (e.g., with a makeup brush), and then presenting themselves in a "going out" or "glammed up" attire. Since its creation, the challenge has evolved. Many people have begun creating their own takes on the challenge (e.g. using different music, highlighting their unique careers, or showcasing their culture) many celebrities, such as Marsai Martin, have joined in on the trend.

== Remixes ==
On 29 May 2020, a remix featuring Latin-R&B and dancehall artist Rauw Alejandro was released. A second remix, featuring American rapper DaBaby, was released on 12 June 2020. On 3 July 2020, a third remix featuring American rapper Busta Rhymes was released. A fourth remix, featuring Congolese-French singer Dadju was released on August 21, 2020. There is also a remix featuring American-born French-Haitian singer Naïka. On October 23, 2020, a sixth remix featuring German rapper GRiNGO was released.

== Charts ==
=== Weekly charts ===
Chart (2019–2020)	Peak position
Belgium (Ultratip Bubbling Under Flanders)	12
Belgium (Ultratip Bubbling Under Wallonia)	3
Canada (Canadian Hot 100)	64
France (SNEP)	31
Hungary (Single Top 40)	19
Ireland (IRMA)	24
Netherlands (Single Top 100)	91
Portugal (AFP)	22
Switzerland (Schweizer Hitparade)	37
Turkey (Radiomonitor International List)	1
UK Singles (OCC)	19
UK Hip Hop/R&B (OCC)	7
US Billboard Hot 100	56
US Hot R&B/Hip-Hop Songs (Billboard)	24
US Pop Airplay (Billboard)	30
US Rhythmic Airplay (Billboard)	5

=== Year-end charts ===
Chart (2020)	Position
Turkey (Radiomonitor International List)	9
UK Singles (OCC)	48
US Hot R&B/Hip-Hop Songs (Billboard)	79
US Rhythmic (Billboard)	26

== Certifications ==
Region	Certification	Certified units/sales
Canada (Music Canada)	Gold	40,000^{‡}
France (SNEP)	Gold	100,000^{‡}
New Zealand (RMNZ)	Platinum	30,000^{‡}
Portugal (AFP)	Platinum	10,000^{‡}
Switzerland (IFPI Switzerland)	Gold	10,000^{‡}
United Kingdom (BPI)	Platinum	600,000^{‡}
United States (RIAA)	Gold	500,000^{‡}
^{‡} Sales+streaming figures based on certification alone.

== Release history ==
Country	Date	Format	Label	Ref.
Various	9 November 2019	Digital download; streaming	Black Butter Records	
United States	15 April 2020	Rhythmic contemporary radio	Black Butter Records	
