= Lap 5 =

Studio album by D-Block Europe
- Released: 23 September 2022
- Genre: British hip-hop
- Length: 52:11

D-Block Europe chronology
The Blue Print: Us vs. Them (2020)	Lap 5 (2022)	DBE World (2023)

Singles from Lap 5
- 1. "Black Beatles" Released: 12 May 2022; 2. "Elegant & Gang" Released: 9 June 2022; 3. "Fantasy" Released: 21 July 2022; 4. "Man in the Mirror" Released: 22 September 2022; 5. "4 the Win" Released: 22 September 2022

Lap 5 is the second studio album by British hip-hop collective D-Block Europe, self-released on 23 September 2022. In addition to featuring members Dirtbike LB and Young Adz on specific tracks, it features guest appearances from Ghost Killer Track and Ed Sheeran, as well as vocals from Burna Boy. The album debuted at number two on the UK Albums Chart and number one on the UK R&B Albums Chart. It was supported with five singles: "Black Beatles", "Elegant & Gang", "Fantasy", "Man in the Mirror" and "4 the Win", which all peaked in the top 50 of the UK Singles Chart. The album was certified gold by the British Phonographic Industry (BPI).

== Critical reception ==
Professional ratings
Review scores
Source	Rating
NME	3/5 stars

Kyann-Sian Williams of NME called the album "intriguing but uneven" but one on which the duo "show precisely why their formula works, and offer room for growth". Williams found that the duo "are truly in their stride when they can blend the more traditional hip-hop styles with suave melodies".

=== Year-end lists ===
Select year-end rankings of Lap 5
Publication	List	Rank	Ref.
Complex UK	Complex UK's Best Albums of 2022	11	

== Track listing ==
Lap 5 track listing
No.	Title	Writer(s)	Producer(s)	Length
1.	"If I Ruled the World"	Nathaniel Williams; Ricky Banton; Handz Beatz	Handz Beatz	3:14
2.	"Conor McGregor"	Williams; Banton; Lucas Dante; Xander Dankbaar	Lucas Dante; ZenderBeats	3:06
3.	"She's Not Anyone"	Williams; Banton; Jonathan Awote-Mensah	Jae5	3:17
4.	"4 the Win"	Williams; Banton; Nathaniel London	Nathaniel London	3:27
5.	"Buy It Plain / Flowers" (featuring Dirtbike LB)	Banton; Serrano Gaddum; Mathias Liyew; Peter Gogola	SRNO; Ambezza; DatBoiGetro	4:24
6.	"Really Miss You"	Williams; Banton; Ché Grant	AJ Tracey	3:07
7.	"Bankroll Got Bigger"	Williams; Banton; Eight8; R14 Beats; Jony Beats	Eight8; R14 Beats; Jony Beats	3:10
8.	"Pass the Parcel"	Williams; Banton; Eight8; R14 Beats; Almer Ament	Eight8; R14 Beats; AMENT	3:27
9.	"Proud of Me" (featuring Dirtbike LB)	Banton	Dirtbike LB	2:40
10.	"Bando Baby Diaries" (featuring Young Adz)	Williams; Mondo; Benjamin Ibrahimovic	Mondo; Yo Benji	2:41
11.	"Half Time"	Williams; Banton; Obi Ebele; Uche Ebele	Da Beatfreakz	3:58
12.	"Fantasy"	Williams; Banton		2:36
13.	"Elegant & Gang" (with Ghost Killer Track)	Williams; Banton; Junior Yape	Ghost Killer Track	3:25
14.	"Lonely Lovers" (featuring Ed Sheeran)	Williams; Banton; Edward Sheeran; Boumidjal WWD; Holo Mobb	Boumidjal; HoloMobb	3:54
15.	"Man in the Mirror" (featuring Young Adz)	Williams; Eight8; R14 Beats; OB MUS1C; Savant	Eight8; R14 Beats; OB MUS1C; Savant	3:05
16.	"Black Beatles"	Williams; Banton; London	Nathaniel London	2:40
Total length:				52:11

Notes

- "She’s Not Anyone" originally featured Burna Boy; however, his verse was removed from the album a week after its release for unknown reasons.

== Charts ==
Chart performance for Lap 5
Chart (2022)	Peak position
Australian Albums (ARIA)	75
Belgian Albums (Ultratop Flanders)	118
Dutch Albums (Album Top 100)	35
Irish Albums (OCC)	13
UK Albums (OCC)	2
UK R&B Albums (OCC)	1

== Certifications ==
Certifications for Lap 5
Region	Certification	Certified units/sales
United Kingdom (BPI)	Gold	100,000^{‡}
^{‡} Sales+streaming figures based on certification alone.

== See also ==
- List of UK R&B Albums Chart number ones of 2022
