= Eagle (D-Block Europe and Noizy song) =

Single by D-Block Europe and Noizy

from the album Rolling Stone
- Released: 11 January 2024
- Length: 4:58 (album version); 3:00 (radio edit)
- Label: D-Block; EGA; UMG
- Songwriters: Adam Williams; Ricky Banton; Rigels Rajku; Obi Ebele; Uche Ebele
- Producer: Da Beatfreakz

D-Block Europe singles chronology
"Skims" (2023)	"Eagle" (2024)

Noizy singles chronology
"Big Budz No Dust" (2023)	"Eagle" (2024)

Music video
- "Eagle" on YouTube

"Eagle" is a song by British hip-hop collective D-Block Europe featuring Albanian singer Noizy. It was released on 11 January 2024, as the third single from D-Block Europe's third full-length studio album, Rolling Stone. The song was produced by Da Beatfreakz.

== Background ==
The track was first teased by Young Adz through an Instagram snippet he posted on September 11, 2023, prior to the official release.

== Composition ==
Writing for Clash, Shanté Collier-McDermott wrote that on "Eagle", Noziy has a "gritty tone adding to the song’s authentic rap feel" and "Young Adz' hook another playful salute".

== Critical reception ==
The Guardian's Thomas Hobbs noted that the track is a "highlight" on Rolling Stone. He also stated that the song "has a rabble-rousing hook as well as an irresistible rags-to-riches sentiment". Damien Morris for The Observer wrote that alongside "Lady in Hermes" and "I Need It Now", the song "reassert[s]" their predilection for spare, almost soporific numbness, with more gleaming melodies a minute than many rappers manage in a lifetime".

== Music video ==
The official William Thomas-directed music video was filmed in multiple locations, most notably in the capital city of Albania, Tirana. While in Tirana, the three artists "made themselves at home while showing off flashy jewellery, [and] high-end vehicles".

== Personnel ==
Credits and personnel adapted from Tidal.

Musicians

- Adam "Young Adz" Williams – lead artist, songwriter, composer
- Ricky "Dirtbike LB" Banton – lead artist, songwriter, composer
- Rigels Rajku – lead artist, songwriter, composer

Technical

- Prince Galalie – mastering engineer
- Prince Galalie – mixing engineer
- IBØ – mixing engineer

== Charts ==
Chart performance for "Eagle"
Chart (2023)	Peak position
UK Singles (OCC)	19
UK Hip Hop/R&B (OCC)	7

== Certifications ==
Certifications for "Eagle"
Region	Certification	Certified units/sales
United Kingdom (BPI)	Silver	200,000^{‡}
^{‡} Sales+streaming figures based on certification alone.
