= Edna (album) =

Studio album by Headie One
- Released: 9 October 2020
- Genres: British hip-hop; UK drill
- Length: 63:29
- Label: Relentless
- Producers: 169; 5ive Beatz; ADP; Al Hug; Ambezza; Benjamin Lasnier; Eyes; Fred Again; Geno; Gottionem; Io; JAIAH; JenneJenne; Kenny Beats; Kyle Stemberger; Lasse Qvist; Lukasbl; M1onthebeat; Madara Beatz; Mokuba Lives; Nyge; ProducerBoy; Quincytellem; Rob Smyles; Toddla T; TSB; WondaGurl

Headie One chronology
Gang (2020)	Edna (2020)

Singles from Edna
- 1. "Only You Freestyle" Released: 20 July 2020; 2. "Ain't It Different" Released: 19 August 2020; 3. "Breathing" Released: 5 October 2020; 4. "Princess Cuts" Released: 8 October 2020

Edna is the debut studio album by British rapper Headie One. It was released by Relentless Records on 9 October 2020. The album features guest appearances from M Huncho, AJ Tracey, Stormzy, Young T & Bugsey, Young Adz, Future, Drake, Skepta, Ivorian Doll, Kenny Beats, Aitch, Haile, Mahalia, and Kaash Paige. A deluxe version of the album was released on 12 February 2021 which features guest appearances from Rich the Kid, NorthSideBenji, Burna Boy and RV.

== Release and promotion ==
Headie One first teased Edna to release on 18 August 2020. On 24 September 2020 Headie One appeared in an interview with 16BARS and spoke about the album and the meaning behind the title, Edna.

My mum's name is Edna. Obviously when I was younger, I was like 3-years old, my mum passed away, init. So I grew up like, it was just me, my pops and my sister, that was my household. You know what I'm tryna' say? So, I felt like I ain't really had nothing to give since this music stuff so I felt like if I was gonna' do my debut album, it's only right I named it after her.

On 2 October 2020 Headie One released the album's official tracklist via his Instagram and Twitter.

On 12 February 2021 Headie released a deluxe edition of Edna which included an additional eight tracks alongside features from Rich the Kid, NorthSideBenji, Burna Boy and RV.

=== Singles ===
The album's lead single, "Only You Freestyle" was released on 20 July 2020, with Drake. The album's seconds single, "Ain't It Different" was released on 19 August 2020, with AJ Tracey and Stormzy. The album's third single, "Breathing" was released on 5 October 2020. The album's fourth and final single, "Princess Cuts" was released on 8 October 2020, with Young T & Bugsey, just a day prior to the release of the entire album.

== Critical reception ==
Professional ratings
Aggregate scores
Source	Rating
AnyDecentMusic?	7.9/10
Metacritic	87/100
Review scores
Source	Rating
AllMusic	4.5/5 stars
The Arts Desk	4/5 stars
Clash	9/10
The Daily Telegraph	4/5 stars
The Line of Best Fit	9/10
Loud and Quiet	8/10
NME	4/5 stars
The Observer	3/5 stars
The Times	4/5 stars

Edna was met with critical acclaim. At Metacritic, which assigns a normalised rating out of 100 to reviews from mainstream publications, the album received an average score of 87 based on five reviews. The aggregator AnyDecentMusic? has the critical consensus of the album at a 7.9 out of 10, based on seven reviews.

Writing for AllMusic, David Crone stated introspection comes to light on Edna for the first time in Headie One's career and that the project "is a reflection of both life and career, paying homage to his diverse sonic palette while offering lyrical insight into his journey here". He also stated that, "sonically, Edna is set out like a banquet of the rapper's works, tapping styles across the scene for a comprehensive representation of his career" and that it is "the sound of its mastery: pulling out all the stops for an expansive statement of self, the Tottenham native provides his most compelling set yet." The Arts Desk's Joe Muggs wrote that the album "sounds like a million pounds: absorbing dancehall, Afro-swing and more styles besides, British rap is now as confident in itself sonically as Headie is lyrically". He wrote that "in many parts [the album's] grim, cold and violent" but "there’s a lot you can learn about this country from hearing that grimness expressed with such determined intelligence." Writing for Clash, Robert Kazandjian stated that "the twenty-track project, dedicated to his late mother, features Headie’s strongest, most reflective writing to date" and that "distance offers clarity, and the further he navigates away from his past life, the more vivid the pictures he paints of it". He noted that "the true power of the album lies in Headies's introspection, when he’s alone with the beat and his thoughts".

The Daily Telegraph's Neil McCormick wrote that "despite its focus on crime and punishment and prodigious use of gangland slang, Edna proves far more thoughtful than the genre’s reputation might lead listeners to expect", however, if you "strip away the lyrics, and the strange mix of electro loops, nervous beats, sad melodies and sci-fi sounds is utterly compelling and contemporary, evidence of a cutting edge local music scene that continues to thrive even with venue doors barred shut". Writing for The Line of Best Fit, Steven Loftin stated that "Edna isn’t made to be an easy listen, it’s made to be a truthful one" and described how the album is "a portrayal of Headies's world up to this moment, and just what he wants to take forward from the rest of it". He noted that "it’s an evolution, not quite a revolution", concluding his review as he noted that "You can’t expect change to come without the past tagging along, reminding you of what waits if a different hand is dealt that changes your path". Loud and Quiet's Max Pilley began his review by writing that throughout the project, Headie "weaves a tale of self-examination and personal growth, using his own life to assemble a fable that hinges on an individual’s capacity to overcome". Pilley makes it clear that the "echoey production dominates" the project, but "Headie also pushes out beyond the drill boundaries". Writing for NME, Caitlin O'Reily compares Edna to Headie's fourth mixtape, Music x Road, stating that "Edna is its grown-up, lavish cousin". She states that the "album is washed in the melancholy, minor-key trap beats requisite of in-vogue modern hip-hop". Concluding the review, O'Reily notes that the album "is proof that he's the unmistakeable, global "King of drill", and much more besides".

Writing for The Observer, Kitty Empire noted that the album "travels a significant distance from his previous fast-paced accounts of life on the streets" and that it "is forced into a dance, of sorts, with Adjei's past". Concluding her review, she states that "Headie One gets to flex, collaborate and try new things, while Irving Adjei feels safe enough to show vulnerability". The Times' Will Hodgkinson states that on the album, "[Headie] captures the dull reality of prison life" and "makes drug dealing sound as appealing as root canal work and wonders if things might have been different had his mother".

=== Year-end lists ===
Select year-end rankings of Edna
Publication	List	Rank	Ref.
Clash	Clash Albums Of The Year 2020	10	
The Fader	The Best Albums of 2020	30	
NME	NME's 50 Best Albums of 2020	27	
Noisey	Noisey's 100 Best Albums of 2020	4	
The Line of Best Fit	The Line of Best Fit's Best Albums of 2020 Ranked	49	
Loud and Quiet	The Loud And Quiet best albums of 2020	36	
The Quietus	The Quietus Albums Of The Year 2020	37	

== Commercial performance ==
The album debuted at number one on the UK Albums Chart, selling 15,494 copies in its first week and earning a total of 25.5 million on-demand streams of the album's songs during that week. It also charted in Australia, Belgium, Canada, the Netherlands, Ireland, and Scotland.

== Track listing ==
Edna track listing
No.	Title	Writer(s)	Producer(s)	Length
1.	"Teach Me"	Irving Adjei	Madara Beatz	2:30
2.	"Psalm 35"	Adjei	Benjamin Lasnier; JenneJenne; Lukasbl; Rob Smyles	2:40
3.	"Bumpy Ride" (featuring M Huncho)	Adjei; M Huncho	Quincytellem	2:21
4.	"Triple Science"	Adjei	Geno; Kyle Stemberger	3:10
5.	"The Light"	Adjei	169	3:31
6.	"Ain't It Different" (featuring AJ Tracey and Stormzy)	Adjei; Ché Grant; Michael Omari, Jr.; Fred Gibson; Thomas Bell; Camille Purcell; Anthony Kiedis; Michael Balzary; Chad Smith; John Frusciante; Marion Hall; Gary Jackson; Steven Marsden	Fred Again; Toddla T	3:16
7.	"Mainstream"	Adjei	Eyes; ProducerBoy	2:10
8.	"Princess Cuts" (featuring Young T & Bugsey)	Adjei; Ra'chard Tucker; Doyin Julius	Io; TSB	3:05
9.	"21 Gun Salute" (featuring Young Adz)	D-Block Europe; Adam Williams; Josiah Dixon; Tyrell Paul	169; JAIAH	3:31
10.	"Five Figures"	Adjei	169	2:46
11.	"Hear No Evil" (featuring Future)	Adjei; Nayvadius Wilburn; Ebony Oshunrinde; Sadiki Forbes	WondaGurl; 5ive Beatz	4:23
12.	"Breathing"	Adjei; Lukas Leth; Benjamin Lasnier; Lasse Qvist	Lasnier; Qvist	2:53
13.	"Only You Freestyle" (with Drake)	Adjei; Aubrey Graham	M1onthebeat	4:10
14.	"Try Me" (featuring Skepta)	Adjei; Joseph Adenuga	Gottionem	3:13
15.	"F U Pay Me" (featuring Ivorian Doll and Kenny Beats)	Adjei; Lei Jennings; Kenneth Blume III; Christopher Layton; Vanessa Mahi	Kenny Beats	2:44
16.	"Parlez-Vous Anglais" (featuring Aitch)	Adjei; Harrison Armstrong	Al Hug; Ambezza	3:20
17.	"Everything Nice" (featuring Haile)	Adjei; Amish Patel	ADP	3:40
18.	"You/Me" (featuring Mahalia)	Adjei; Mahalia Burkmar	Mokuba Lives	3:17
19.	"Therapy"	Adjei; Nyge; Quincytellem	Nyge; Quincytellem	2:11
20.	"Cold" (featuring Kaash Paige)	Adjei; D'Kyla Woolen; Oshunrinde	WondaGurl	4:38
Total length:				63:29

Deluxe edition track listing
No.	Title	Writer(s)	Producer(s)	Length
1.	"Hung Jury"	Adjei; Keven Wolfsohn; Paul Goller; Alastair O'Donnell	The Elements; AoD	3:01
2.	"Bussdown" (featuring Rich the Kid)	Adjei; Dimitri Roger; Kelly	Nyge	2:24
3.	"Showed Me" (featuring NorthSideBenji)	Adjei; Jaiden Watson; Patel	ADP	2:52
4.	"Siberia" (featuring Burna Boy)	Adjei; Damini Ogulu; Wolfsohn; Goller; O'Donnell	The Elements; AoD	2:53
5.	"Level Up"	Adjei; K Tokyo	K Tokyo	3:31
6.	"Dressing Gown"	Adjei; MikaBeats; N1	MikaBeats; N1	3:09
7.	"Zodiac" (featuring RV)	Adjei; Jordan Townsend; Kenneth Blume III; Nils Nöhden	Kenny Beats; Nils	3:09
8.	"Yet"	Adjei; Ghosty	Ghosty	3:14
Total length:				87:42

== Charts ==
Chart performance for Edna
Chart (2020)	Peak position
Australian Albums (ARIA)	22
Belgian Albums (Ultratop Flanders)	84
Canadian Albums (Billboard)	86
Dutch Albums (Album Top 100)	36
Irish Albums (Official Charts)	3
Scottish Albums (Official Charts)	55
UK Albums (Official Charts)	1
UK R&B Albums (Official Charts)	2

== Certifications ==
Certifications for Edna
Region	Certification	Certified units/sales
United Kingdom (BPI)	Gold	100,000^{‡}
^{‡} Sales+streaming figures based on certification alone.

== See also ==
- List of UK Albums Chart number ones of the 2020s
