= Huncholini the 1st =

Mixtape by M Huncho
- Released: 31 January 2020
- Genres: British hip hop; trap
- Length: 42:02
- Label: Island
- Producers: Quincy Tellem; Pyroman; ADP; Cagebeats; Capi; Dez Wright; Eurobeats; HoneywoodSix; Junior Bula Monga; Kyle Junior; Kyle Stemberger; Mazza; MOHR; Take A Daytrip

M Huncho chronology
Utopia (2019)	Huncholini the 1st (2020)	Chasing Euphoria (2022)

Singles from Huncholini the 1st
- 1. "Thumb" Released: 2019; 2. "Bando Ballads" Released: 2020; 3. "Pee Pee" Released: 2020

Professional ratings
Review scores
Source	Rating
AllMusic	3/5 stars
Clash	8/10

Huncholini the 1st is the second mixtape by British rapper M Huncho. It was released on 31 January 2020 via Island Records. It features guest appearances from D-Block Europe, Headie One and Nafe Smallz. The mixtape debuted at number 5 on the UK Albums Chart. It spawned three singles: Quincy Tellem-produced "Thumb" and "Bando Ballads" and ADP/Payday produced "Pee Pee", which peaked at numbers 30, 78 and 32, on the UK Singles Chart, respectively.

The mixtape was BPI-certified Silver in October 2020 for over 60,000 streaming and sales units moved in the United Kingdom, becoming M Huncho’s second project to receive a Silver certificate after his 2019 mixtape, Utopia.

== Track listing ==
Huncholini the 1st track listing
No.	Title	Producer(s)	Length
1.	"Growth"	Honeywoodsix; Mazza	2:37
2.	"Pee Pee"	ADP; Payday	3:33
3.	"Huncho for Mayor"	Junior Bula Monga	2:53
4.	"Eagles"	Quincy Tellem	4:17
5.	"Head Huncho" (featuring Headie One)	Mohr; Pyroman	3:11
6.	"Hit & Miss"	Pyroman	1:56
7.	"Thumb" (featuring Nafe Smallz)	Quincy Tellem	3:38
8.	"Dishonourable"	Capi; Dez Wright	2:47
9.	"Blow Off My Cover"	Eurobeats	3:30
10.	"Indulge" (featuring D-Block Europe)	Kyle Junior; Kyle Stemberger	4:53
11.	"Bando Ballads"	Quincy Tellem	3:25
12.	"True Colours"	Take A Daytrip	3:15
13.	"Wait Til' I Finish"	Cagebeats	2:02
Total length:			42:02

== Charts ==
=== Weekly charts ===
Weekly chart performance for Huncholini the 1st
Chart (2020)	Peak position
UK Albums (Official Charts)	5

=== Year-end charts ===
Year-end chart performance for Huncholini the 1st
Chart (2020)	Position
UK Albums (OCC)	95

== Certifications ==
Region	Certification	Certified units/sales
United Kingdom (BPI)	Gold	100,000^{‡}
^{‡} Sales+streaming figures based on certification alone.
