= We Won =

2020 single by D-Block Europe

Single by D-Block Europe

from the album The Blue Print: Us vs. Them
- Released: 6 August 2020
- Length: 3:00
- Label: D-Block Europe; D-Block Records; UMG
- Songwriters: Adam Nathaniel "Young Adz" Williams; Ricky Earl "Dirtbike LB" Banton
- Producer: Catch 22 Beats

D-Block Europe singles chronology
"Plain Jane" (2020)	"We Won" (2020)	"UFO" (2020)

Music video
- "We Won" on YouTube

"We Won" is a song by British hip-hop collective D-Block Europe. It was released as a single in 2020 and peaked at number 31 on the UK Singles Chart.

== Charts ==
Chart performance for "We Won"
Chart (2020)	Peak position
UK Singles (OCC)	31

== Certifications ==
Certifications for "We Won"
Region	Certification	Certified units/sales
United Kingdom (BPI)	Silver	200,000^{‡}
^{‡} Sales+streaming figures based on certification alone.
