= Prada (Cassö, Raye and D-Block Europe song) =

Song by Cassö, Raye and D-Block Europe

Single by Cassö, Raye and D-Block Europe
- Released: 11 August 2023
- Genre: Trance
- Length: 2:12
- Label: Ministry of Sound
- Songwriters: Rachel Agatha Keen; Adam Williams; Ricky Earl Banton; Obi Ebele; Jahmori Simmons
- Producer: Cassö

Cassö, Raye and D-Block Europe singles chronology
"Prada" (2023)	"Zeros" (2024)

Raye singles chronology
"The Weekend" (2023)	"Prada" (2023)	"Worth It" (2023)

D-Block Europe singles chronology
"Potential" (2023)	"Prada" (2023)	"I Need It Now" (2024)

Lyric video
- "Prada" on YouTube

"Prada" is a song by British DJ and producer Cassö. It is a remix of D-Block Europe's 2021 single "Ferrari Horses" featuring Raye, and was released as a single on 11 August 2023 through Ministry of Sound.

== Background ==
In May 2023, Cassö, a British DJ and producer, posted an unofficial remix of the song "Ferrari Horses" on his TikTok, which gained attraction and went viral on the app. The remix was officially retitled "Prada" and was released as a single on 11 August 2023.

== Commercial performance ==
"Prada" topped the charts in eight music markets and reached the top ten in various regions. The song peaked at number 2 on the UK Singles Chart, and sat at number one for thirty one weeks on the UK Dance Singles Chart. It received multiple music certifications, including a triple platinum certification by the British Phonographic Industry. It was nominated for Song of the Year at the Brit Awards 2024.

== Charts ==
=== Weekly charts ===
Weekly chart performance for "Prada"
Chart (2023–2024)	Peak position
Australia (ARIA)	3
Australia Dance (ARIA)	1
Austria (Ö3 Austria Top 40)	1
Belgium (Ultratop 50 Flanders)	1
Belgium (Ultratop 50 Wallonia)	7
Canada Hot 100 (Billboard)	50
Czech Republic Airplay (ČNS IFPI)	94
Czech Republic Singles Digital (ČNS IFPI)	6
Denmark (Tracklisten)	4
Finland (Suomen virallinen lista)	6
France (SNEP)	16
Germany (GfK)	1
Global 200 (Billboard)	21
Hungary (Dance Top 40)	17
Hungary (Single Top 40)	33
Iceland (Tónlistinn)	5
Ireland (IRMA)	1
Italy (FIMI)	92
Latvia (LAIPA)	4
Lithuania (AGATA)	3
Luxembourg (Billboard)	5
Netherlands (Dutch Top 40)	2
Netherlands (Single Top 100)	1
New Zealand (Recorded Music NZ)	11
Nigeria (TurnTable Top 100)	50
Norway (VG-lista)	3
Poland (Polish Streaming Top 100)	25
Portugal (AFP)	65
Slovakia Airplay (ČNS IFPI)	27
Slovakia Singles Digital (ČNS IFPI)	4
Sweden (Sverigetopplistan)	1
Switzerland (Schweizer Hitparade)	3
Turkey International Airplay (Radiomonitor Türkiye)	10
UK Singles (Official Charts)	2
UK Dance (Official Charts)	1
US Hot Dance/Electronic Songs (Billboard)	5

=== Year-end charts ===
2023 year-end chart performance for "Prada"
Chart (2023)	Position
Australia (ARIA)	61
Austria (Ö3 Austria Top 40)	23
Belgium (Ultratop 50 Flanders)	33
Belgium (Ultratop 50 Wallonia)	99
Denmark (Tracklisten)	40
Germany (Official German Charts)	20
Hungary (Single Top 40)	64
Netherlands (Dutch Top 40)	16
Netherlands (Single Top 100)	18
Sweden (Sverigetopplistan)	27
Switzerland (Schweizer Hitparade)	41
UK Singles (OCC)	33
US Hot Dance/Electronic Songs (Billboard)	48

2024 year-end chart performance for "Prada"
Chart (2024)	Position
Australia (ARIA)	19
Australia Dance (ARIA)	1
Austria (Ö3 Austria Top 40)	9
Belgium (Ultratop 50 Flanders)	11
Belgium (Ultratop 50 Wallonia)	29
Denmark (Tracklisten)	25
Estonia Airplay (TopHit)	66
France (SNEP)	117
Germany (GfK)	6
Global 200 (Billboard)	71
Hungary (Dance Top 40)	69
Hungary (Single Top 40)	90
Iceland (Tónlistinn)	15
Netherlands (Single Top 100)	22
New Zealand (Recorded Music NZ)	38
Poland (Polish Streaming Top 100)	81
Portugal (AFP)	182
Sweden (Sverigetopplistan)	15
Switzerland (Schweizer Hitparade)	16
UK Singles (OCC)	13
US Hot Dance/Electronic Songs (Billboard)	27

2025 year-end chart performance for "Prada"
Chart (2025)	Position
Belgium (Ultratop 50 Flanders)	84
Hungary (Dance Top 40)	68

== Certifications ==
Certifications for "Prada"
Region	Certification	Certified units/sales
Australia (ARIA)	5× Platinum	350,000^{‡}
Austria (IFPI Austria)	2× Platinum	60,000^{‡}
Belgium (BRMA)	3× Platinum	120,000^{‡}
Canada (Music Canada)	Gold	40,000^{‡}
Denmark (IFPI Danmark)	2× Platinum	180,000^{‡}
France (SNEP)	Diamond	333,333^{‡}
Germany (BVMI)	2× Platinum	1,200,000^{‡}
Hungary (MAHASZ)	5× Platinum	20,000^{‡}
Italy (FIMI)	Platinum	100,000^{‡}
New Zealand (RMNZ)	3× Platinum	90,000^{‡}
Poland (ZPAV)	3× Platinum	150,000^{‡}
Portugal (AFP)	Platinum	10,000^{‡}
Spain (Promusicae)	Platinum	60,000^{‡}
Switzerland (IFPI Switzerland)	4× Platinum	120,000^{‡}
United Kingdom (BPI)	3× Platinum	1,800,000^{‡}
United States (RIAA)	Gold	500,000^{‡}
Streaming
Greece (IFPI Greece)	Platinum	2,000,000^{†}
Sweden (GLF)	Platinum	8,000,000^{†}
^{‡} Sales+streaming figures based on certification alone.^{†} Streaming-only figures based on certification alone.

== Release history ==
Region	Date	Format(s)	Version(s)	Label(s)	Ref.
Various	11 August 2023	digital download; streaming	Original	Ministry of Sound	
Italy	1 September 2023	Radio airplay	Original	Sony Music	
