= Rolling Stone (album) =

Studio album by D-Block Europe
- Released: 12 January 2024
- Studio: IBØ Studio (Paris)
- Length: 48:29
- Label: D-Block; EGA Records; UMG
- Producer: 24x7; Da Beatfreakz; Boumidjal; CIKI; Eight8; HAL; Harry Beech; Harry East; Hash-K; HoloMobb; J Lib; Keyon; Lankz Beats; Lone Wolf; Macshooter; Mike Vegas; Moneyxo; OB Mus1c; Olli P; Stella Nova; TheScam; Vespxcci

D-Block Europe chronology
DBE World (2023)	Rolling Stone (2024)	PTSD 2 (2025)

Singles from Rolling Stone
- 1. "I Need It Now" Released: 30 November 2023; 2. "Skims" Released: 4 January 2024; 3. "Eagle" Released: 11 January 2024

Rolling Stone is the third full-length studio album by British hip hop collective D-Block Europe (consisting of Young Adz and Dirtbike LB), independently released through EGA Records and UMG on 12 January 2024. The album is a follow-up to their sixth mixtape, DBE World in July 2023. The album features guest appearances from Kodak Black, Noizy, and Yxng Bane, alongside production from Da Beatfreakz, Eight8, Harry Beech, Lone Wolf, and Mike Vegas, alongside several other producers.

== Background ==
The album was first announced on 30 November 2023, following the release of its lead single released on the same day, "I Need It Now". To promote the sale of the album, they also announced their first show back at The O2 Arena in London stating that early access to the tickets will be given to buyers who pre-order their new album. However, the date quickly sold out, resulting in Young Adz and Dirtbike LB adding another three dates for the O2 Arena, all of which continued to sell out. Due to high demand, they also announced a show in Manchester's AO Arena. In order to promote the release and sales of the album, the rap duo announced physical album signing dates in partnership with HMV who will assist them in their stores in Nottingham, Leeds, Birmingham, and Manchester.

D-Block Europe released the album's second single, "Skims" on 4 January 2024, alongside its official music video. The track's main lyrical topic was of Kim Kardashian's shapewear and clothing brand, Skims as the two artists rap about the brand, Kim, alongside firearms, money, and drugs. On 10 January 2024, Young Adz had taken to his social media to post the album's tracklist, previewing guest appearances from Kodak Black, Noizy, and Yxng Bane. Just a day prior to the release of the album, D-Block Europe released the third and final single from the album, "Eagle" with Noizy, accompanied by its official music video, which was filmed in Albania.

Following the release of the album, on January 25, 2024, D-Block Europe released the official music video for "Badgalriri".

== Critical reception ==
Professional ratings
Review scores
Source	Rating
Clash	8/10
The Guardian	2/5 stars
The Observer	4/5 stars

Rolling Stone received mediocre reviews from critics. Writing for Clash, Shanté Collier-McDermott wrote that "DBE have delivered love and anti-love anthems for past few years, and as we get into their third album – and at least ninth overall project – it's admirable to see them still churning out refreshing but similar themed tracks". He stated that "for every upbeat bubbler this album also has a sombre pick, giving a realistic depiction of their journey". Thomas Hobbs for The Guardian praised the artists, noting that "D-Block Europe's formula has been wildly successful: a catchy combination of saccharine Auto-Tune effects, x-rated bars, melancholic trap beats and woozy hooks about drug dealing", however, "on their third studio album, Young Adz and Dirtbike LB's formula reaches its limitations". Hobbs noted that "Rolling Stone teems with addictively wavy trap that shimmers with a fascinating mix of glory and paranoia", but notes that their lyricism is basic and "surface-level". Summarising his review, he stated that "anything that approaches depth on the album is immediately overlooked in favour of misogynistic sex talk or tirades about luxury items".

Writing for The Observer, Damien Morris noted that despite "the pair's lyrics [being] often uninspiring", D-Block Europe "have spoken and rapped eloquently in the past about the horrors of trap life, their unstable mental health and therapy's consolations, yet interventions here rarely extend beyond sex and shopping". Morris wrote that "sometimes Adz's ever-present AutoTune makes his rapping sound like being importuned by a dying robot", but "once you're addicted to their codeine-paced palliatives, Rolling Stone offers its own therapy via an unexpectedly comforting listen".

== Commercial performance ==
Rolling Stone landed at the number one position on the UK Albums Chart. The album beat out 21 Savage's American Dream and The Vaccines' Pick-Up Full of Pink Carnations for the number one spot. Singles "I Need to Know", "Skims", and "Eagle" charted on the UK singles chart: "I Need to Know" (78), "Skims" (72), and "Eagle" (19). UK chart rules prevent artists from having more than three songs in the top 40 at once, otherwise, D-Block Europe's album would have generated further new entries in the countdown.

== Track listing ==
Rolling Stone track listing
No.	Title	Writer(s)	Producer(s)	Length
1.	"I Need It Now"	Adam Williams; Ricky Banton; Conran Doderer; Harry Beech	Eight8; Harry Beech	3:05
2.	"Go Go Gang"	Williams; Banton; Doderer; Fin Lankz	Eight8; Lankz Beats	3:56
3.	"Poisonous Tongue"	Williams; Banton; Boumidjal	Boumidjal; HoloMobb	2:43
4.	"Girls Love Lies"	Williams; Banton; Lone Wolf; Moneyxo; Aleksandr Tabensky; Stella Nova	Lone Wolf; Moneyxo; Vespxcci; Stella Nova	2:53
5.	"Bando Aiko"	Williams; Banton; 24x7	24x7	3:33
6.	"Pink Lemonade" (with Yxng Bane)	Williams; Banton; Larry Kiala; Boumidjal	Boumidjal; HoloMobb	2:44
7.	"Still Outside"	Williams; Banton; Lone Wolf; OB Mus1c; Harry East; J Lib	Lone Wolf; OB Mus1c; Harry East; J Lib	3:45
8.	"Eagle" (with Noizy)	Williams; Banton; Rigels Rajku; Obi Ebele; Uche Ebele	Da Beatfreakz	4:57
9.	"Skims"	Williams; Banton; TheScam; Crisostum	TheScam; Crisostum	3:02
10.	"Gassed Up Like Esso"	Williams; Banton; Doderer; Lankz	Eight8; Lankz Beats	2:55
11.	"Metro Bank"	Williams; Banton; Mykhailo Metreveli; Maximilian McFarlin; Keyon	Mike Vegas; Macshooter; Keyon	2:57
12.	"Not All Heroes Wear Capes"	Williams; Banton; Doderer; Lankz	Eight8; Lankz Beats	3:05
13.	"Lady in Hermes"	Williams; Banton; Lone Wolf; HAL; CIKI; Tabensky	Lone Wolf; HAL; CIKI; Vespxcci	3:20
14.	"Badgalriri"	Williams; Banton; Lone Wolf; Olli P; Tabensky	Lone Wolf; Olli P; Vespxcci	2:24
15.	"Still Play Valorant" (with Kodak Black)	Williams; Banton; Bill Kapri; Doderer; Beech	Eight8; Harry Beech	3:11
Total length:				48:29

== Personnel ==
D-Block Europe

- Young Adz – rap vocals
- Dirtbike LB – rap vocals

Additional contributors

- Prince Galalie – mastering, mixing
- Harold "IBØ Studio" Hotton – mixing, recording
- Yxng Bane – rap vocals (6)
- Noizy – rap vocals (8)
- Kodak Black – rap vocals (15)

== Charts ==
Chart performance for Rolling Stone
Chart (2024)	Peak position
Irish Albums (OCC)	15
Scottish Albums (OCC)	2
UK Albums (OCC)	1
UK R&B Albums (OCC)	1

== Certifications ==
Region	Certification	Certified units/sales
United Kingdom (BPI)	Silver	60,000^{‡}
^{‡} Sales+streaming figures based on certification alone.
