= Young T & Bugsey =

English hip hop duo

- Origin: Nottingham, England
- Genres: British hip hop; afroswing
- Years active: 2010–present
- Labels: Black Butter Records; Sony Music UK
- Members: Ra'chard "Young T" Tucker; Doyin "Bugsey" Julius

Young T & Bugsey are an English hip hop duo from Nottingham consisting of rappers Ra'chard "Young T" Tucker and Doyin "Bugsey" Julius.

== History ==
Young T & Bugsey began gaining attention in 2016 with singles such as "Glistenin'" and "No Mickey Mouse Ting", as well as "Gangland" and "4x4" in 2017. In 2018, they released multiple singles including "Greenlight", "Ay Caramba", "En Route", and "Living Gravy". They rose to prominence outside the UK with their song "Don't Rush" going viral on TikTok. On 20 March 2020, they released their debut mixtape Plead the 5th, with singles including "Strike a Pose" and "Bully Beef". On 21 January 2022, the duo released their second mixtape Truth Be Told, supported by the singles "Prada Bae", "Big Bidness", "Roberto C", "Blessings", and "Nice".

== Members ==
- Young T (born Ra'chard Tucker in Nottingham, England – 9 May 1997)
- Bugsey (born Doyin Julius in Ibadan, Nigeria – 7 March 1997)

== Discography ==
=== Mixtapes ===
List of mixtapes, showing release date, label, and formats
| Title | Details | Peak chart positions | | |
| Title | Details | UK | FRA | IRE |
|---|---|---|---|---|
| Plead the 5th | Released: 20 March 2020; Label: Black Butter; Formats: Digital download, streaming | 25 | 147 | 81 |
| Truth Be Told | Released: 21 January 2022; Label: Black Butter; Formats: Digital download, streaming | – | – | – |

=== Singles ===
==== As lead artist ====
List of singles as lead artist, with selected chart positions and certifications, showing year released and album name
| Title | Year | Peak chart positions | | | | | | Certifications | Album |
| Title | Year | UK | UK R&B | CAN | FRA | IRE | US | Certifications | Album |
|---|---|---|---|---|---|---|---|---|---|
| "Glistenin'" | 2016 | — | — | — | — | — | — | | Non-album single |
| "No Mickey Mouse Ting" | 2016 | — | — | — | — | — | — | | Non-album single |
| "What's That (Is It a Monster?)" | 2017 | — | — | — | — | — | — | | Non-album single |
| "Gangland" (featuring Belly Squad) | 2017 | — | — | — | — | — | — | | Non-album single |
| "4x4" | 2017 | — | — | — | — | — | — | BPI: Silver | Non-album single |
| "Greenlight" | 2018 | — | — | — | — | — | — | | Non-album single |
| "Favourite Girl" (with D-Block Europe featuring Young Adz & Dirtbike LB) | 2018 | — | — | — | — | — | — | | Non-album single |
| "Ay Caramba" (with Stay Flee Get Lizzy and Fredo) | 2018 | 32 | — | — | — | — | — | BPI: Platinum | Non-album single |
| "En Route" | 2018 | — | — | — | — | — | — | | Non-album single |
| "Living Gravy" (featuring Not3s) | 2018 | — | — | — | — | — | — | | Non-album single |
| "Again" | 2019 | — | — | — | — | — | | | Non-album single |
| "Strike a Pose" (featuring Aitch) | 2019 | 9 | 7 | — | — | — | — | BPI: 2× Platinum | Plead the 5th |
| "Don't Rush" (featuring Headie One or DaBaby) | 2019 | 19 | 13 | 64 | 66 | 24 | 56 | BPI: Platinum; MC: Gold; RIAA: Gold; SNEP: Gold | Plead the 5th |
| "Bully Beef" (featuring Fredo) | 2020 | 48 | — | — | — | — | — | | Plead the 5th |
| "New Shape" | 2020 | 99 | — | — | — | — | — | | Non-album single |
| "Prada Bae" (featuring Nafe Smallz) | 2021 | — | — | — | — | — | — | | Truth Be Told |
| "Big Bidness" | 2021 | — | — | — | — | — | — | | Truth Be Told |
| "Roberto C" (featuring Unknown T) | 2021 | — | — | — | — | — | — | | Truth Be Told |
| "Blessings" (featuring Chronixx) | 2022 | — | — | — | — | — | — | | Truth Be Told |
| "Nice" (featuring Blxst) | 2022 | — | — | — | — | — | — | | Truth Be Told |
"—" denotes a recording that did not chart or was not released in that territory.

==== As featured artist ====
List of singles as featured artist, showing year released and album name
| Title | Year | Peak chart positions | Certifications | Album |
| Title | Year | UK | Certifications | Album |
|---|---|---|---|---|
| "Flexxin" (Cashh featuring Young T & Bugsey) | 2017 | — | | Non-album singles |
| "Left Right" (Da Beatfreakz featuring C Biz & Young T & Bugsey) | 2017 | — | | Non-album singles |
| "Main Squeeze" (Unknown T featuring Young T & Bugsey) | 2020 | 99 | | Rise Above Hate |
| "Princess Cuts" (Headie One featuring Young T & Bugsey) | 2020 | 11 | BPI: Gold | Edna |
| "Boom Bam" (Not3s featuring Young T & Bugsey) | 2021 | — | | 3 Th3 Album |
"—" denotes a recording that did not chart or was not released in that territory.

=== Guest appearances ===
List of non-single guest appearances, showing year released, other artists and album name
| Title | Year | Other artist(s) | Album |
|---|---|---|---|
| "Banana" (Remix) | 2017 | Belly Squad, Abra Cadabra, Timbo, Showkey | Banana – EP |
| "Hit a Raise" | 2017 | Izzie Gibbs | Yin Yang – EP |
| "Time Bomb" (GA Remix) | 2017 | Banx & Ranx, Lady Leshurr | Non-album remix |
| "Scatter" | 2018 | Zdot | Golden Boot – EP |

== Filmography ==
=== Short ===
| Year | Title | Young T's role | Bugsey's role | Notes |
|---|---|---|---|---|
| 2015 | Guillemot | Ra'chard | Doyin | |

=== Television ===
| Year | Title | Young T's role | Bugsey's role | Notes |
|---|---|---|---|---|
| 2019 | MOTDx | Themselves | | Series 1; episode 4 |
| 2019-2021 | Soccer AM | Themselves | | Series 24 (Episode 15), Series 26 (Episode 9) |
| 2020 | Saving OurSelves: BET COVID-19 Relief Effort | Themselves | | TV special |
| 2020 | The Rap Game UK | Themselves/Mentor's | | Episode "Collab & Clash" |
| 2021 | Tonight With Target | Themselves/Guests | | Series 1; episode 4 |

== Awards and nominations ==
| Year | Organization | Award | Nominated work | Result |
|---|---|---|---|---|
| 2019 | NME | Essential New Artists for 2019 | Themselves | Included |
| 2019 | MTV Push | Ones To Watch 2019 | Themselves | Nominated |
| 2020 | BET Awards | Best New International Act | Themselves | Nominated |
| 2021 | Brit Awards | British Group | Themselves | Nominated |
| 2021 | Brit Awards | Song of the Year | "Don't Rush" | Nominated |
