= Ferrari Horses =

Song by D-Block Europe featuring Raye

Single by D-Block Europe featuring Raye

from the album The Blue Print: Us vs. Them
- Released: 4 March 2021
- Recorded: 2020
- Length: 3:45
- Label: Self-released
- Songwriters: Adam Nathaniel "Young Adz" Williams; Ricky Earl "Dirtbike LB" Banton; Rachel Keen; Jahmori Simmons
- Producer: Da Beatfreakz

D-Block Europe singles chronology
"UFO" (2020)	"Ferrari Horses" (2021)	"Kevin McCallister" (2021)

Raye singles chronology
"Bed" (2021)	"Ferrari Horses" (2021)	"Call on Me" (2021)

Lyric video
- "Ferrari Horses" on YouTube

"Ferrari Horses" is a song by British hip hop collective D-Block Europe featuring British singer Raye. It was released as a single in 2021 from D-Block Europe's 2020 album The Blue Print: Us vs. Them, reaching number 14 on the UK Singles Chart and being certified platinum by the British Phonographic Industry (BPI). In 2023, it was remixed by British DJ and producer Cassö and retitled "Prada", which charted higher in the UK and internationally.

== Background ==
On 9 October 2020, British hip hop duo D-Block Europe self-released their debut studio album, The Blue Print: Us vs. Them. "Ferrari Horses" is the 21st song on the album, and features English singer and songwriter Raye. It was released as a single on 4 March 2021.

== Cassö remix ==
Cassö posted an unofficial remix of "Ferrari Horses" on his TikTok in May 2023, which gained attraction and went viral on the app. It was officially titled "Prada", and was released as a single on 11 August 2023. It topped the charts in eight music markets and reached the top ten in various regions and received multiple music certifications. It was nominated for "Song of the Year" at the Brit Awards 2024.

== Charts ==
=== Weekly charts ===
Weekly chart performance for "Ferrari Horses"
Chart (2021)	Peak position
Ireland (IRMA)	27
UK Singles (Official Charts)	14
UK Hip Hop/R&B (Official Charts)	5

=== Year-end charts ===
2021 year-end chart performance for "Ferrari Horses"
Chart (2021)	Position
UK Singles (OCC)	63

== Certifications ==
Certifications for "Ferrari Horses"
Region	Certification	Certified units/sales
United Kingdom (BPI)	Platinum	600,000^{‡}
^{‡} Sales+streaming figures based on certification alone.
