= Street Trauma =

Mixtape by D-Block Europe
- Released: 27 December 2019
- Length: 43:53
- Label: Self-released

D-Block Europe chronology
PTSD (2019)	Street Trauma (2019)	The Blue Print: Us vs. Them (2020)

Professional ratings
Review scores
Source	Rating
Up to Eleven	5/10

Street Trauma is a mixtape by English hip hop collective D-Block Europe. It was released on 27 December 2019. The album was BPI certified Gold on 22 December 2023.

== Release ==
In early December 2019, rapper Young Adz announced on his official Instagram that the group would release their next mixtape on 27 December 2019.

== Singles and charting songs ==
"No Cellular Site", the mixtape's only single, reached number 29 on the UK Singles Chart. Two other songs, "Creep" and "Molly World", charted the week of the mixtape's chart debut, reaching numbers 53 and 63 on the UK Singles Chart, respectively.

== Track listing ==
Street Trauma track listing
No.	Title	Length
1.	"Creep"	2:32
2.	"Bando Boy"	2:32
3.	"Change"	2:39
4.	"No Cellular Site"	2:53
5.	"Molly World"	3:24
6.	"Jeffery Carter"	3:00
7.	"Pain Game"	3:15
8.	"UK Gossip"	2:54
9.	"Gloria"	3:15
10.	"Prescription Drugs"	2:20
11.	"Set in Stone"	3:08
12.	"Miley"	3:37
13.	"Dismissive"	2:53
14.	"Monster"	1:39
15.	"Beautiful"	1:49
16.	"I Just"	2:03
Total length:		43:53

== Charts ==
Chart performance for Street Trauma
Chart (2020)	Peak position
UK Albums (OCC)	9
UK R&B Albums (OCC)	13

== Certifications ==
Certifications for Street Trauma
Region	Certification	Certified units/sales
United Kingdom (BPI)	Gold	100,000^{‡}
^{‡} Sales+streaming figures based on certification alone.
