= The Blue Print: Us vs. Them =

Studio album by D-Block Europe
- Released: 9 October 2020
- Genre: British hip hop
- Length: 91:37
- Producer: Carson Avery Lee; Jony-Christan Linton-Jude

D-Block Europe chronology
Street Trauma (2019)	The Blue Print: Us vs. Them (2020)	Lap 5 (2022)

Singles from The Blue Print: Us vs. Them
- 1. "Free 22" Released: 11 June 2020; 2. "Plain Jane" Released: 9 July 2020; 3. "We Won" Released: 6 August 2020; 4. "UFO" Released: 2 October 2020; 5. "Ferrari Horses" Released: 4 March 2021

Professional ratings
Review scores
Source	Rating
Clash	4/10
The Guardian	2/5 stars

The Blue Print: Us vs. Them is the debut studio album by British hip hop collective D-Block Europe, self-released on October 9, 2020. It features guest appearances from Aitch, Lil Pino, Raye, Srno and Stefflon Don. The album debuted at number 2 on the UK Albums Chart and number 1 on the UK R&B Albums Chart. It was supported with five singles: "Free 22", "Plain Jane", "We Won", "UFO" and "Ferrari Horses", which all peaked in the UK Official Singles Chart's top 40. The album was BPI certified Platinum on May 23, 2025, for accumulating over 300,000 album-equivalent units in the United Kingdom.

== Track listing ==
The Blue Print: Us vs. Them track listing
No.	Title	Length
1.	"Destiny"	3:27
2.	"Birds Are Chirping"	3:35
3.	"Cartier Rings"	2:56
4.	"Shame on Me"	3:07
5.	"Top Thai"	2:19
6.	"Michelin star" (featuring Stefflon Don)	3:44
7.	"We Won"	3:00
8.	"Mr Mysterious"	3:07
9.	"Perkosex"	2:28
10.	"Last Night in Marbella"	2:38
11.	"Proud"	3:39
12.	"All the Time"	2:27
13.	"Plain Jane"	2:50
14.	"Whistle"	2:27
15.	"Codeine & Fashion"	4:08
16.	"Drunkfxckstupid"	3:27
17.	"Last Night in Paris"	2:43
18.	"Table Manners"	2:50
19.	"UFO" (featuring Aitch)	3:24
20.	"Blessed & Destined"	2:58
21.	"Ferrari Horses" (featuring Raye)	3:49
22.	"Gulag" (featuring Lil Pino)	2:29
23.	"Tutorial"	2:38
24.	"Seashore" (featuring Srno)	2:57
25.	"Big B"	3:06
26.	"Only Fans"	3:44
27.	"Free 22"	4:37
28.	"GS9"	3:30
29.	"Pure"	3:35
Total length:		91:37

== Personnel ==
- Young Adz – performer (tracks 1–9, 11–21, 23–29)
- Dirtbike LB – performer (tracks 1–10, 12–16, 18–24, 26–29)
- Stefflon Don – performer (track 6)
- Aitch – performer (track 19)
- Raye – performer (track 21)
- Lil Pino – performer (track 22)
- GOKO! - producer (track 8)
- Srno – performer (track 24)
- Carson Avery Lee – producer (track 22)
- Jony-Christan Linton-Jude – producer (tracks 1, 23, 25, 27)
- Sean D Engineer – recording, mixing, mastering
- Meero – producer (tracks 3–4)
- Mindthegap – producers (track 11)
- BKH Beats – producer (tracks 2–9)

== Charts ==
=== Weekly charts ===
Weekly chart performance for Blue Print: Us vs. Them
Chart (2020)	Peak position
Dutch Albums (Album Top 100)	61
Irish Albums (OCC)	37
UK Albums (OCC)	2
UK R&B Albums (OCC)	1

=== Year-end charts ===
Year-end chart performance for The Blue Print: Us vs. Them
Chart (2021)	Position
UK Albums (OCC)	69

== Certifications ==
Certifications for The Blue Print: Us vs. Them
Region	Certification	Certified units/sales
United Kingdom (BPI)	Platinum	300,000^{‡}
^{‡} Sales+streaming figures based on certification alone.

== See also ==
- List of UK R&B Albums Chart number ones of 2020
