= M Huncho =

Afghan-British rapper

- Born: 18 November 1993 (age 32); London, England
- Genres: British hip hop; trap
- Occupations: Rapper; singer; songwriter
- Years active: 2017–present
- Label: Island
- Website: mhuncho.co.uk

M Huncho is a British rapper and singer from North West London. He performed a Mad About Bars online freestyle session in 2017, and releasing his first EP Get Out that October, with the single "Mediocre" and another EP, 48 Hours, following in 2018. 2019 debut studio mixtape 'Utopia' has been streamed over 77 million times globally, and reached number 13 on the UK Albums Chart. His second mixtape, Huncholini the 1st, was released in January 2020 and peaked at number 5 in the UK. M Huncho has also worked with Nafe Smallz, Yxng Bane, Headie One, Yung Bleu, Dutchavelli and Unknown T.

== Discography ==
=== Studio albums ===
List of studio albums with selected details
Title	Details	Peak chart positions		
Title	Details	UK	UK R&B	NLD
Chasing Euphoria	Released: 20 May 2022; Label: Island; Format: CD, LP, digital download, streaming	5	1	86
My Neighbours Don't Know	Released: 8 September 2023; Label: MYB, EGA; Format: CD, LP, digital download, streaming	9	1	89
The Wizard	Released: 19 June 2026; Label: MYB, EGA; Format: CD, LP, digital download, streaming	53	1	—

=== Mixtapes ===
List of commercial mixtapes with selected details
Title	Details	Peak chart positions					Certifications
Title	Details	UK	UK R&B	BEL (Wa)	IRE	NLD	Certifications
Utopia	Released: 12 April 2019; Label: Island; Format: CD, digital download, streaming	13	8	—	—	—	BPI: Gold
Huncholini the 1st	Released: 24 January 2020; Label: Island; Format: Cassette, CD, digital download, streaming	5	2	188	68	33	BPI: Gold
U2opia	Released: 14 February 2025; Label: MYB, 10K Projects; Format: Cassette, CD, LP, digital download, streaming	30	5	—	—	—	
"—" denotes a recording that did not chart or was not released in that territory.

=== Collaborative mixtapes ===
List of collaborative mixtapes with selected details
Title	Details	Peak chart positions		
Title	Details	UK	UK R&B	NLD
DNA (with Nafe Smallz)	Released: 30 October 2020; Label: HunchOZone; Format: CD, digital download, streaming	6	2	57
36 Hours (with Potter Payper)	Released: 10 May 2024; Label: 36TL; Format: Digital download, streaming	28	3	—

=== Extended plays ===
List of extended plays with selected details
Title	Details	Peak chart positions
Title	Details	UK
Get Out	Released: 29 October 2017; Label: Self-released; Format: Digital download, streaming	—
48 Hours	Released: 13 April 2018; Label: Self-released; Format: Digital download, streaming	68
Another Tape	Released: 7 November 2024; Label: MYB, 10K; Format: Digital download, streaming	—
Road 2 U2opia	Released: 8 November 2024; Label: MYB, 10K; Format: Digital download, streaming	—

=== Singles ===
==== As lead artist ====
List of singles, with year released, selected chart positions and certifications
Title	Year	Peak chart positions		Certifications	Album
Title	Year	UK	UK R&B/HH	Certifications	Album
"Mad About Bars" (with Mixtape Madness and Kenny Allstar)	2017	—	—	BPI: Silver	Mad About Bars - Season 1
"Westwood Crib Session"	2017	—	—		Non-album singles
"Mediocre"	2018	—	—		Non-album singles
"Kenny Allstar Freestyle"	2018	—	—		Non-album singles
"Art of War" (with Headie One and Fumez the Engineer featuring RV)	2018	—	—		The Mix-Tape 2
"Fire in the Booth, Pt.1" (with Charlie Sloth)	2019	—	—		Non-album single
"One Summer"	2019	87	—		Top Boy: A Selection of Music Inspired by the Series
"Leader of the Tribe (Freestyle)"	2019	—	—		Non-album single
"Thumb" (with Nafe Smallz)	2019	30	19	BPI: Silver	Huncholini the 1st
"Winning" (with Fastlane Wez)	2019	—	—		Non-album single
"Bando Ballads"f>	2019	78	—		Huncholini the 1st
"5AM" (with Nafe Smallz)	2020	25	16		DNA
"PMW" (featuring Nafe Smallz)	2020	67	—		DNA
"Flooded" (with Nafe Smallz)	2020	46	23		DNA
"Overpriced"	2021	70	—		Non-album single
"Heavy Duty" (with Eno)	2021	—	—		Ensar
"Breadwinner"	2021	94	—		Non-album singles
"Hiatus (Freestyle)"	2021	72	27		Non-album singles
"Warzone" (featuring Headie One)	2022	41	22		Chasing Euphoria
"Lean" (featuring Giggs)	2022	93	—		Chasing Euphoria
"The Worst"	2022	—	—		Chasing Euphoria
"Who We Are" (featuring Yung Bleu)	2022	—	—		Chasing Euphoria
"Pray 2 The East" (featuring BNXN)	2022	—	—		Chasing Euphoria
"Daily Duppy"	2022	—	—		Non-album singles
"By Any Means" (with ORIO and Malik Montana)	2022	—	—		Non-album singles
"Hear No Evil (For the Money)"	2022	—	—		Non-album singles
"See No Evil (Run It Up)"	2022	—	—		Non-album singles
"Speak No Evil"	2022	—	—		Non-album singles
"Planting Seeds" (with Groundworks)	2023	—	—		The G Tape: Volume 2
"Conspiracy Charges"	2023	—	—		Non-album single
"Go Getter" (with A2)	2023	—	—		Are You as Bored as I Am?
"Where You Been?"	2023	—	—		My Neighbours Don't Know
"Colder Than Ice" (with Groundworks and Steve Drive)	2024	—	—		The G Tape, Vol. 3
"French Tips"	2024	—	—		Non-album single
"Two Wise Men" (with Potter Payper)	2024	—	—		36 Hours
"3hree6ix Hours" (with Potter Payper)	2024	—	—		36 Hours
"Positive Influences"	2024	—	—		Another Tape & Road 2 U2opia
"Sea of Sorrows"	2024	—	—		Another Tape & Road 2 U2opia
"Naturally"	2024	—	—		Another Tape & Road 2 U2opia
"10:54"	2024	—	—		U2opia
"Rugratz" (with Xoxo)	2025	—	—		Non-album single
"Tuff Right?"	2025	—	—		U2opia
"Championship"	2026	43	13		The Wizard
"Wizard of Oz"	2026	—	—		The Wizard
"We Up"	2026	—	—		The Wizard
"—" denotes a recording that did not chart or was not released in that territory.

==== As featured artist ====
List of singles, with selected chart positions, showing year charted and album name
Title	Year	Peak chart positions				Certifications	Album
Title	Year	UK	UK R&B/HH	IRE	NZ Hot	Certifications	Album
"On Top" (D'One featuring M Huncho)	2017	—	—	—	—		Non-album singles
"Droptop" (Yung Fume featuring M Huncho)	2018	—	—	—	—		Non-album singles
"Seasick" (Ay Em featuring M Huncho)	2018	—	—	—	—		Non-album singles
"Broken Homes" (The Plug featuring Nafe Smallz, M Huncho and Gunna)	2018	38	14	—	—	BPI: Silver	Plug Talk
"Like a Film" (Nafe Smallz featuring M Huncho)	2019	73	—	—	—		Good Love
"Stick" (GRXGVR featuring M Huncho, NorthSideBenji and Hoodlum)	2019	—	—	—	—		Non-album single
"No Love in the Streets" (Jack featuring M Huncho)	2020	—	—	—	—		Traplove
"Burning" (GRM Daily featuring M Huncho and Dutchavelli)	2020	13	10	81	—	BPI: Gold	GRM 10
"Dancing On Ice" (Yxng Bane featuring Nafe Smallz and M Huncho)	2021	45	23	—	—		Non-album singles
"Early Morning" (Park Hill featuring M Huncho)	2021	—	—	—	—		Non-album singles
"Wonderland" (Unknown T featuring M Huncho)	2021	52	17	—	—		Adolescence
"Catch Up" (Potter Payper featuring M Huncho)	2021	70	33	—	—		Thanks for Waiting
"Misunderstood Pt. 2" (Youngn Lipz featuring M Huncho)	2021	—	—	—	12		Area Baby
"—" denotes a recording that did not chart or was not released in that territory.

=== Other charted and certified songs ===
List of songs, with selected chart positions, showing year charted and album name
Title	Year	Peak chart positions			Certifications	Album
Title	Year	UK	UK R&B/HH	FRA	Certifications	Album
"Fugazi" (Lacrim featuring M Huncho and 3robi)	2019	—	—	115		Lacrim
"Keeper" (D-Block Europe featuring Lil Pino, M Huncho and Nafe Smallz)	2019	—	—	—	BPI: Silver	Home Alone
"Birds"	2019	88	—	—		Utopia
"Ocho Cinco"	2019	63	30	—		Utopia
"Rock Bottom" (featuring Yxng Bane)	2019	80	—	—		Utopia
"Tranquility"	2019	—	—	—	BPI: Silver	Utopia
"In My Bag" (Slim featuring M Huncho)	2019	—	—	—	BPI: Silver	Still Working
"Head Huncho" (featuring Headie One)	2020	60	—	—		Huncholini the 1st
"Indulge" (featuring D-Block Europe)	2020	—	—	—	BPI: Silver	Huncholini the 1st
"Pee Pee"	2020	32	17	—	BPI: Silver	Huncholini the 1st
"Part Of The Plan" (Nafe Smallz featuring M Huncho)	2020	38	21	—		Goat World
"Bumpy Ride" (Headie One featuring M Huncho)	2020	—	16	—		Edna
"Cold World" (with Nafe Smallz and Young Adz)	2020	93	—	—		DNA
"M.A.L.A" Gazo featuring M Huncho)	2022	—	—	27		KMT
"Pistolet 45" Jul featuring M Huncho)	2022	—	—	53		Cœur
"—" denotes a recording that did not chart or was not released in that territory.

=== Guest appearances ===
List of non-single guest appearances, with year released, other artist(s) and album name shown
Title	Year	Other artist(s)	Album
"Secure the Bag"	2018	Headie One	The One
"Fugazi"	2019	Lacrim, 3robi	Lacrim
"Keeper"	2019	D-Block Europe, Nafe Smallz, Lil Pino	Home Alone
"Giddy Up"	2019	The Plug, Rich the Kid	Plug Talk
"Back to Back"	2019	D-Block Europe	PTSD
"Addicts"	2020	Unknown T	Adolescence
"Bumpy Ride"	2020	Headie One	Edna
"Mood"	2021	D-Block Europe	Home Alone 2
"M.A.L.A"	2022	Gazo	KMT
"Shipping Costs"	2022	K-Trap	The Last Whip II
"End of The Beginning"	2022	wewantwraiths	HeartBrokeChild
"Pistolet 45"	2022	Jul	Cœur Blanc
"Nothing Like Me"	2023	Nines	Crop Circle 2
"Rock Climbing"	2023	Nafe Smallz	High Profile
"Picky"	2023	Nafe Smallz	High Profile
"Operation Fortress"	2023	D-Block Europe	DBE World
"Baby Mums Crib"	2023	Digga D	Back to Square One
"Give God Praises"	2024	Ivandro	Trovador
"Slippery Slope"	2024	Skrapz	Reflection
"Trapsuperhero"	2024	Branco	Baba Business 3

== Filmography ==
Television
Year	Title	Role	Network	Notes
2020	The Big Narstie Show	Himself	Series 3; Episode 2	
2020	The Rap Game UK	Himself	Series 2; Episode 5 (Archive Footage)	
2020	Don't Hate The Playaz	Himself/Special Guest	Series 3; Episode 5	
2020	MOBO Awards	Himself/Performer	Television Special	
2021	Tonight With Target	Himself/Guest	Series 1; Episode 2	
