= Nafe Smallz =

British rapper from Luton

- Born: Nathan Adams; 16 July 1996 (age 29); Luton, Bedfordshire, England
- Genres: British hip hop; trap
- Occupations: Rapper; singer; songwriter
- Years active: 2013–present
- Label: Øzone Music

Nathan Adams (born 16 July 1996), known professionally as Nafe Smallz, is a British rapper, singer and songwriter from Luton, Bedfordshire. He took the UK trap scene by storm with his song "WDYM" on Link Up TV. He's has since released mixtapes such as Goat World and DNA with rapper M Huncho. He has worked with artists like Chip, Skepta and Lil Tjay.

== Discography ==
=== Mixtapes ===
List of mixtapes, with selected details and peak chart positions
Title	Details	Peak chart positions	
Title	Details	UK	UK R&B
Ozone Music	Released: 22 January 2015; Label: Ozone Music; Format: Digital download, streaming	—	—
Movie Music	Released: 19 January 2018; Label: Ozone Music; Format: Digital download, streaming	—	—
Good Love	Released: 21 June 2019; Label: Ozone Music; Format: Digital download, streaming	48	21
Goat World	Released: 17 April 2020; Label: Ozone Music; Format: Digital download, streaming	12	7
DNA (with M Huncho)	Released: 30 October 2020; Label: Hunchozone; Format: Digital download, streaming	6	2
Legacy	Released: 27 May 2022; Label: Ozone Music; Format: Digital download, streaming	52	1
High Profile	Released: 23 June 2023; Label: Ozone Music; Format: Digital download, streaming	98	3
Ticket to the Moon	Released: 16 February 2024; Label: Ozone Music; Format: Digital download, streaming	—	26
Neighbourhood (with Chip)	Released: 5 July 2024; Label: CMZ; Format: Digital download, streaming	49	—
It's Not You, It's Me	Released: 30 January 2026; Label: Ozone Music; Format: Digital download, streaming	—	—
"—" denotes a recording that did not chart or was not released in that territory.

=== Extended plays ===
Title	Details
Project Ø	Released: 31 May 2015; Label: Ozone Music; Format: Digital Download, Streaming
Overnight	Released: 27 May 2021; Label: Ozone Music; Format: Digital Download, Streaming

=== Singles ===
==== As lead artist ====
List of singles as lead artist, with selected chart positions, showing year released and album name
Title	Year	Peak chart positions	Album
Title	Year	UK	Album
"In the Zone"	2015	—	Non-album singles
"What Do You Mean"	2015	—	Non-album singles
"Smokin" (Solo or remix featuring Chip and Black the Ripper)	2016	—	Non-album singles
"Keep It Real" (featuring Kong)	2016	—	Non-album singles
"Seems Baby"	2016	—	Non-album singles
"Dressed To Kill"	2016	—	Non-album singles
"Frontline" (featuring Squeeks)	2016	—	Non-album singles
"Pronto"	2016	—	Non-album singles
"Seven Days Freestyle"	2016	—	Non-album singles
"From The Curb" (featuring King Krus & Klayz)	2016	—	Non-album singles
"Superstar" (featuring Puffy L'z)	2017	—	Non-album singles
"These Days"	2017	—	Non-album singles
"Gucci"	2017	—	Movie Music
"Wanna Know Ya"	2018	—	Movie Music
"Global Now"	2018	—	Non-album singles
"Steppin in Sauce"	2018	—	Non-album singles
"Quasar"	2018	—	Non-album singles
"Come Alive"	2018	—	Non-album singles
"Told You"	2018	—	Non-album singles
"Wouldn't Believe It"	2019	—	Good Love
"Like a Film" (featuring M Huncho)	2019	73	Good Love
"Good Love" (featuring Tory Lanez)	2019	47	Good Love
"Riding On E"	2019	—	Top Boy (A Selection of Music Inspired by the Series)
"8 Missed Calls"	2019	—	Top Boy (A Selection of Music Inspired by the Series)
"Run It Up"	2019	—	Non-album singles
"Be Friends"	2020	—	Non-album singles
"Home Run"	2020	—	Non-album singles
"Ocean Deep" (featuring Wretch 32)	2020	—	Goat World
"Quarantine Freestyle"	2020	—	Goat World
"Plan Tonight" (featuring Geko)	2020	—	Non-album single
"5AM" (with M Huncho)	2020	25	DNA
"Flooded" (with M Huncho)	2020	46	DNA
"PMW" (with M Huncho)	2020	67	DNA
"Cold World" (with M Huncho featuring Young Adz)	2020	93	DNA
"Elegance" (featuring Lil Tjay)	2022	73	Legacy
"Bad"	2022	—	Legacy
"Khalifa"	2022	—	Legacy
"Off The Rip"	2022	—	Legacy
"Most Wanted" (with wewantwraiths)	2022	—	HeartBrokeChild
"—" denotes a recording that did not chart or was not released in that territory.

==== As featured artist ====
List of singles as featured artist, with selected chart positions, showing year released and album name
Title	Year	Peak chart positions	Certifications	Album
Title	Year	UK	Certifications	Album
"Broken Homes" (The Plug featuring Nafe Smallz, M Huncho and Gunna)	2018	38	BPI: Silver	Plug Talk
"Greaze Mode" (Skepta featuring Nafe Smallz)	2019	18	BPI: Platinum	Ignorance Is Bliss
"Time" (Bouncer featuring Nafe Smallz and Dirtbike LB)	2019	—		Non-album single
"Wave Time 2" (Mastermind featuring Nafe Smallz and Chip)	2019	—		Non-album single
"Thumb" (M Huncho featuring Nafe Smallz)	2019	30	BPI: Silver	Huncholini the 1st
"Faith in my Killy" (GRM Daily featuring Nafe Smallz, Yxng Bane, Blade Brown, Skrapz)	2020	75		GRM 10
"Off-White" (K-Trap featuring Nafe Smallz)	2020	—		Non-album single
"Dancing On Ice" (Yxng Bane featuring Nafe Smallz and M Huncho)	2021	—		Non-album single
"No Distractions" (Lil Berete featuring Nafe Smallz)	2021	—		Icebreaker 2
"Prada Bae" (Young T & Bugsey featuring Nafe Smallz)	2021	—		Truth Be Told
"—" denotes a recording that did not chart or was not released in that territory.

=== Other certified songs ===
List of other certified songs, showing year released and album name
Title	Year	Certifications	Album
"Keeper" (D-Block Europe featuring Lil Pino, M Huncho and Nafe Smallz)	2019	BPI: Silver	Home Alone
"Bad To The Bone"	2019	BPI: Silver	Good Love

=== Other guest appearances ===
List of non-single guest appearances, with other performing artists, showing year released and album name
Title	Year	Other artist(s)	Album
"They Ain't 100 (Remix)"	2016	Fredo, Yxng Bane, Little Torment, Yung Fume	Non-album remix
"Higher"	2017	Young Kye	What They Didn't Want
"Should Be Gone (Interlude)"	2017	Young Kye	What They Didn't Want
"TNT"	2019	M Huncho	Utopia
"Trust"	2019	The Plug, Loski, Youngboy Never Broke Again	Plug Talk
"No Apologies"	2019	Fekky	4Life
"Believer"	2020	Branco, Gilli	Euro Connection
"All For Da Cheddar"	2020	Sleeks	Paper Cuts
"Realist"	2020	Nines, Funds	Crabs In A Bucket
"Super High"	2020	SL	Different Dude
"Headshot"	2021	Branco	Baba Business 2
"All White/Interlude"	2021	Wretch 32, K-Trap	little BIG Man
"Money/Problems"	2021	Skrapz	Be Right Back
"No Forgiveness"	2021	Unknown T	Adolescence
"Navy Seal"	2023	D-Block Europe	DBE World
"Thanks For Hating"	2024	Potter Payper	Thanks For Hatng
"My Slime"	2025	Aitch	4 (Deluxe)

== Personal life ==
He is a supporter of Arsenal F.C.
