= D-Block Europe =

British hip hop collective

- Origin: Lewisham, London, England
- Genres: British hip hop; trap
- Works: D-Block Europe discography
- Years active: 2014–present
- Labels: D-Block Records; EGA Distro; Caroline
- Members: Young Adz; Dirtbike LB
- Website: dblockeurope.com

D-Block Europe, often abbreviated to DBE, is a British hip hop collective consisting of Adam Nathaniel "Young Adz" Williams, and Ricky Earl "Dirtbike LB" Banton. Their name originated after being co-signed by Jadakiss, resulting in Jadakiss launching the European stable of his record label D-Block Records, creating D-Block Europe. They started to put out tracks on their own label at the beginning of 2014. The group rose to fame in 2017 after releasing numerous singles including "Large Amounts", "Darling" and "NASSty".

D-Block Europe's first album The Blue Print: Us vs. Them reached number two on the UK Albums Chart on 16 October 2020. Before their Central Cee collaboration (Overseas) debuted inside the Top 10 on 26 November 2021, D-Block Europe were the act with the most hits without a top 10, despite managing to chart 29 singles into the UK top 75. Their second album Lap 5 also reached number two on the UK Albums Chart on 30 September 2022.

They achieved their second top-10 single on the UK Singles Chart following their appearance on Clavish's November 2022 single "Rocket Science", which peaked at number 9 on the UK Singles Chart. Months later, in June 2023, D-Block Europe released "Pakistan", which peaked at number 8 on the UK Singles Chart, marking their third top-10 single and second in a one-year span. Following the release of "Pakistan", they released their mixtape DBE World, which peaked at number six on the UK Albums Chart; with the album, DBE broke the record for the rap act with the most top-ten albums in UK history. This was later followed by the release of "Prada" in August 2023, a remixed version of DBE's "Ferrari Horses". Following the track's official release, it reached number 2 on the UK Singles Chart, marking their highest charting single while reaching number 1 in several countries such as Germany, Ireland, Netherlands, and Sweden. It also made its debut on the Canadian Hot 100 and the Billboard Global 200.

== Career ==
=== 2010–2019: Career beginnings, Any Minute Now, Home Alone, PTSD, and Street Trauma ===
Adam Nathaniel "Young Adz" Williams, half of D-Block Europe first began to create music in 2010 whereas Ricky Earl "Dirtbike LB" Banton was in and out of the streets at a young age. In 2013, Williams received a life-changing co-sign from New York legend, Jadakiss who saw potential in the young artist. Jadakiss later flew over to London to launch the European staple of his record label D-Block Records, hence the stage name, "D-Block Europe". The collective initially consisted of Young Adz and another rapper, Aero Sinc, however, Banton later joined the group after Williams promised to get off the streets together.

Releasing several singles, DBE's first official mixtape, the Yxng Bane-assisted Any Minute Now was released on 20 July 2018. The album peaked in the top 20 on the UK Albums Chart, peaking at number 14. DBE's debut solo mixtape, Home Alone was released on 15 February 2019. The project featured their hit single "Kitchen Kings", which peaked at number 16 on the UK Singles Chart resulting in the mixtape peaking at number 6 on the UK Albums Chart, marking their first appearance in the top 10.

On 4 July 2019, DBE released "Home Pussy", the lead single for their mixtape PTSD. The single peaked at number 20 on the UK Singles Chart. The project's second single, "Nookie" featuring Atlanta native Lil Baby was released on 12 September 2019. The track peaked at number 16 on UK Singles Chart, becoming their second single to reach the peak. The mixtape's final single, "Playing for Keeps" featuring Dave was released just a day prior to the project on 26 September 2019. The track peaked at number 21 on the UK Singles Chart. DBE's second mixtape, the highly acclaimed PTSD was released on 27 September 2019. The project featured AJ Tracey, Chip, Dave, Jackboy, Krept and Konan, K-Trap, Lil Baby, Lil Pino, M Huncho, and Yxng Bane. Peaking at number five on the UK Albums Chart, the project marked DBE's highest charting album.

On 27 December 2019, DBE released "No Cellular Site", the lead single to their third mixtape, Street Trauma, which was released the same day. The mixtape peaked at number nine on the UK Albums Chart, making it their third in the top 10.

=== 2020–2021: The Blue Print: Us vs. Them and Home Alone 2 ===
On 11 June 2020, D-Block Europe released "Free 22", the lead single to their debut studio album, The Blue Print: Us vs. Them. Shortly after, they released "Plain Jain" and "We Won" on 9 July 2020, and 6 August 2020, respectively. Months later, the Aitch-assisted "UFO" was released on 2 October 2020. The track proceeded to peak at number 11 on the UK Singles Chart becoming their highest-peaking track at the time. This was followed by the release of the Raye-assisted "Ferrari Horses" on 9 October 2020, peaking at number 14 on the UK Singles Chart. On 9 October 2020, DBE officially released their debut full-length studio album, The Blue Print: Us vs. Them which debuted at number two on the UK Albums Chart after being blocked from the number-one position from Headie One's debut album, Edna.

On 1 July 2021, D-Block Europe released the Lil Pino-assisted, "Kevin McCallister", the lead single to their fourth mixtape, Home Alone 2, the sequel to their debut mixtape, Home Alone. Months later, on 29 October 2021, D-Block Europe released "No Competition", the mixtape's second single while officially announcing the project. The track peaked at number 18 on the UK Singles Chart. Just a month later, on 19 November 2021, DBE released "Overseas" with Central Cee. The track proceeded to peak at number 6 on the UK Singles Chart, making it DBE's highest peak on the charts. The mixtape's final single, "Make You Smile" featuring AJ Tracey was released on 19 November 2021. The track peaked at number 15 on the Singles Charts. Home Alone 2 was officially released on 19 November 2021, peaking at number six on the UK Albums Chart.

=== 2022–2024: Lap 5, DBE World and Rolling Stone ===
On 12 May 2022, DBE released "Black Beatles", the lead single from their second studio album, Lap 5. The second single, "Elegant & Gang" accompanied by Ghost Killer Track was released on 9 June 2022. The track peaked at number 18 on the UK Singles Chart. The third single, "Fantasy" was released on 21 July 2022, peaking at number 49 on the UK Singles Chart. Alongside the single's release, the album was officially announced. The album's fourth single, "Man in the Mirror", solely featuring Williams, was released on 16 September 2022, peaking at number 40 on the Singles Chart. The album's final single, "4 the Win" was released just a day prior to the official album. On 23 September 2022, Lap 5 was officially released, debuting at number two on the UK Albums Chart.

On 17 November, D-Block Europe appeared on Clavish's "Rocket Science" which peaked at number nine on the UK Singles Chart, marking their second top-ten single. "Side Effects", the lead single for D-Block Europe's fifth mixtape, DBE World was released on 15 June 2023. The track peaked at number 53 on the UK Singles Chart. The mixtape's second single, the highly anticipated "Pakistan" featuring Clavish was released on 29 June 2023. The single peaked at number eight on the UK Singles Chart, marking DBE's third top-ten single. The mixtape's final single, "Potential" was released just a day prior to the official mixtape, peaking at number 48 on the Singles Chart. On 7 July 2023, DBE World was officially released and proceeded to peak at number six on the UK Albums chart, marking their seventh in the top ten. The mixtape also broke the record for the most top-ten hip-hop albums by an artist in the UK history.

On 11 August 2023, a remix of "Ferrari Horses" with Cassö and Raye, "Prada", was released. The track proceeded to reach number 2 on the UK Singles Chart, marking D-Block Europe's highest charting single and their second top 10 in 2023. On 30 November 2023, D-Block Europe released "I Need It Now", the lead single to their third full-length studio album, Rolling Stone. Alongside the album announcement, they also announced their first concert back at the O2 Arena. After selling out their first show in just two days, they announced another four dates at the O2 Arena alongside a date in the Manchester AO Arena. On 4 January 2024, D-Block Europe released "Skims", the second single from Rolling Stone. On 11 January 2024 DBE released the final single from their album, "Eagle" featuring Noizy after filming the music video in Albania just days prior. On 12 January 2024 D-Block Europe released third full-length studio album, Rolling Stone. The album debuted at number one on the UK Albums Chart becoming D-Block Europe's first number one album on the chart and extending their record as the rap artists with the most top ten albums. Rolling Stone sold 18,000 album-equivalent units in its first week, with 58.2% of its total coming from the 11,000 physical copies sold in the album's first week. On the UK Singles Chart the tracks "I Need it Now", "Skims", and "Eagle" reached number 78, 72, and 19, respectively. UK chart rules prevent artists from having more than three songs in the top 40 at once, otherwise, data showed that an additional two tracks would appear on the charts. The album also beat out 21 Savage's American Dream which debuted at the #2 spot and The Vaccines' Pick-Up Full of Pink Carnations which debuted at #3.

=== 2025–present: PTSD 2 ===
On 14 November 2025, D-Block Europe released their sixth mixtape, PTSD 2, spawning the singles "Wrongs" featuring Lil Tjay and "Bad Luck". The mixtape debuted at number 4 on the UK Albums Chart, with its singles charting at number 51 and 44 respectively on the UK Singles Chart.

== Discography ==
Studio albums

- The Blue Print: Us vs. Them (2020)
- Lap 5 (2022)
- Rolling Stone (2024)

Mixtapes

- Home Alone (2019)
- PTSD (2019)
- Street Trauma (2019)
- Home Alone 2 (2021)
- DBE World (2023)
- PTSD 2 (2025)

== Filmography ==
=== Television ===
Year	Title	Yung Adz's role	Dirtbike LB's role	Notes
2020	The Big Narstie Show	Themselves		Series 3; Episode 3

== Awards and nominations ==
Year	Organization	Award	Work	Result	Reference
2020	MOBO Awards 2020	Best Hip Hop Act	Themselves	Nominated	
2021	MOBO Awards 2021	Best Hip Hop Act	Themselves	Won	
2022	Brit Awards	Best Group	Themselves	Nominated	
2022	MOBO Awards 2022	Best Hip Hop Act	Themselves	Won	
2022	MOBO Awards 2022	Best Male Act	Themselves	Nominated	
2023	MOBO Awards 2023	Best Male Act	Themselves	Nominated	
2024	Brit Awards	Song of the Year	"Prada" (with Cassö and Raye)	Nominated	
