= Fredo discography =

Discography

- Studio albums: 5
- Mixtapes: 2
- Singles: 29
- Featured singles: 18
- Promotional singles: 1
- Guest appearances: 7

This is the discography of Fredo, a British rapper who has released five studio albums, two mixtapes and twenty-nine singles as a lead artist.

== Studio albums ==
List of studio albums, with selected details
Title	Album details	Peak chart positions					Certifications
Title	Album details	UK	UK R&B/HH	BEL (FL)	IRE	NLD	Certifications
Third Avenue	Released: 1 February 2019; Label: Since '93, RCA; Formats: CD, digital download	5	1	—	28	59	BPI: Silver
Money Can't Buy Happiness	Released: 29 January 2021; Label: Since '93, RCA; Formats: CD, digital download, streaming	2	3	106	2	43	BPI: Gold
Independence Day	Released: 6 August 2021; Label: Since '93; Formats: Digital download, streaming	9	11	—	23	86	BPI: Silver
Unfinished Business	Released: 11 August 2023; Label: PG; Formats: Digital download, streaming	9	1	—	91	—	
Motion Sickness	Released: 19 June 2026; Label: Biordi; Formats: Digital download, streaming	81	—	—	—	—	

== Mixtapes ==
List of mixtapes, with selected details
Title	Album details	Peak chart positions			Certifications
Title	Album details	UK	UK R&B/HH	NLD	Certifications
Get Rich or Get Recalled	Released: 24 March 2017; Label: Since '93; Format: Digital download	77	11	—	
Tables Turn	Released: 9 February 2018; Label: Since '93; Format: Digital download	5	4	100	BPI: Silver
"—" denotes a recording that did not chart or was not released in that territory.

== Singles ==
=== As lead artist ===
Title	Year	Peak chart positions			Certifications	Album
Title	Year	UK	UK R&B/HH	IRE	Certifications	Album
"Like That"	2017	—	—	—		Non-album singles
"All Summer" (with Hypo & Ratlin)	2017	—	—	—		Non-album singles
"Change"	2017	63	33	—	BPI: Silver	Non-album singles
"PG Tips" (with Mitch)	2017	—	—	—		Non-album singles
"Rappin' & Trappin'"	2018	70	38	—	BPI: Silver	Tables Turn
"Ay Caramba" (with Stay Flee Get Lizzy & Young T & Bugsey)	2018	32	14	—	BPI: Platinum	Stars Aligned
"Funky Friday" (with Dave)	2018	1	1	21	BPI: 3× Platinum	Non-album single
"BMT"	2018	25	11	—	BPI: Silver	Third Avenue
"All I Ever Wanted" (featuring Dave)	2019	15	6	74		Third Avenue
"Mulla" (with Lil Dotz)	2019	—	—	—		Mulla
"2 Cups" (with Stay Flee Get Lizzy, Popcaan and Tory Lanez)	2019	55	—	—	BPI: Silver	Stars Aligned
"Netflix & Chill"	2019	13	4	43	BPI: Gold	Non-album singles
"Scorpion"	2020	37	22	80		Non-album singles
"Hickory Dickory Dock" (Note: "Hickory Dickory Dock" was briefly released as a single before being removed from all digital outlets and streaming platforms.)	2020	72	—	—		Non-album singles
"Daily Duppy" (featuring GRM Daily)	2020	46	—	—	BPI: Silver	Non-album singles
"What Can I Say"	2020	—	—	—		Money Can't Buy Happiness
"Back to Basics"	2021	20	8	39	BPI: Silver	Money Can't Buy Happiness
"Money Talks" (featuring Dave)	2021	3	1	8	BPI: Gold	Money Can't Buy Happiness
"Independence Day Freestyle"	2021	64	37	—	BPI: Silver	Independence Day
"Meant to Be" (with Stay Flee Get Lizzy and Central Cee)	2021	17	7	50		Stars Aligned
"Talk of the Town"	2021	34	10	80		Independence Day
"Wandsworth to Bullingdon" (featuring Headie One)	2021	36	8	67		Independence Day
"I'm Back"	2022	33	27	98		Non-album single
"Dave Flow"	2023	30	13	77		Unfinished Business
"Everybody Knows"	2023	76	38	—		Unfinished Business
"Scoreboard" (with Tiggs Da Author)	2023	69	—	—		Unfinished Business
"Quarter Past 3" (with Eric IV)	2023	61	37	—		Unfinished Business
"Uh Uh" (with Clavish)	2024	70	—	—		Chapter 16
"Attach" (with Sidhu Moose Wala & Steel Banglez)	2024	—	—	—		Non-album single
"No Comment"	2025	41	8	—		Motion Sickness
"Runnin"	2026	52	17	—		Motion Sickness
"Birthday" (with Burna Boy & Steel Banglez)	2026	—	—	—		Motion Sickness
"—" denotes a recording that did not chart or was not released in that territory.

=== As a featured artist ===
Title	Year	Peak chart positions				Certifications	Album
Title	Year	UK	UK R&B/HH	IRE	NZ Hot	Certifications	Album
"Dun Talkin'" (Remix) (Kojo Funds featuring JME, Frisco, Yxng Bane & Fredo)	2016	—	—	—	—		Non-album singles
"Active" (Ratlin featuring Fredo & Ayo Beatz)	2017	—	—	—	—		Non-album singles
"YRF" (GRM Daily featuring Fredo & Not3s)	2017	—	—	—	—		Non-album singles
"Addams Family" (RA featuring Fredo)	2018	—	—	—	—		Non-album singles
"Problem" (Yxng Bane featuring Fredo)	2018	75	24	—	—		HBK
"Negra" (Shadel MX featuring Fredo)	2018	—	—	—	—		Non-album single
"For the Bag" (Frenchie B featuring Fredo)	2018	—	—	—	—		Probleem — EP
"Not My Dons" (The Plug featuring Fredo, Lacrim & 3Robi)	2019	—	—	—	—		Non-album single
"So High" (Mist featuring Fredo)	2019	7	3	47	—	BPI: 2× Platinum	Non-album singles
"LeBron" (1k Merv featuring Fredo)	2019	—	—	—	—		Non-album singles
"No Time" (Keke TTB featuring Fredo)	2019	—	—	—	—		Non-album singles
"Bully Beef" (Young T & Bugsey featuring Fredo)	2020	48	30	—	—		Plead the 5th
"Sirop" (334 featuring 2s & Fredo)	2020	—	—	—	—		Non-album singles
"Hood Dreams" (G-Money featuring Fredo)	2020	—	—	—	—		Non-album singles
"Nightmare on Finger Street" (Lil Friendzone featuring Young Schneeli & Fredo)	2020	—	—	—	—		Non-album singles
"Granted" (Kvssy featuring Fredo)	2020	—	—	—	—		Non-album singles
"House Party" (Mist featuring Fredo)	2020	—	—	—	—		Non-album singles
"Toxic Trait" (Stormzy featuring Fredo)	2023	11	4	31	11		Non-album singles
"—" denotes a recording that did not chart or was not released in that territory.

=== Promotional singles ===
Title	Year	Peak chart positions		Album
Title	Year	UK	UK R&B/HH	Album
"Survival of the Fittest"	2019	58	30	Third Avenue

== Other charted and certified songs ==
Title	Year	Peak chart positions				Certifications	Album
Title	Year	UK	UK R&B/HH	IRE	NZ Hot	Certifications	Album
"They Ain't 100"	2016	—	—	—	—	BPI: Silver	Get Rich or Get Recalled
"Mmhm"	2019	60	33	—	—		Third Avenue
"I'm the One" (with MoStack)	2019	39	21	—	—		Stacko
"Freddy"	2019	53	33	—	—		Top Boy – A Selection of Music Inspired by the Series
"Ready" (featuring Summer Walker)	2021	21	9	—	—	BPI: Silver	Money Can't Buy Happiness
"Burner on Deck" (featuring Pop Smoke and Young Adz)	2021	18	8	33	—		Money Can't Buy Happiness
"In the Fire" (Dave featuring Fredo, Meekz, Giggs, and Ghetts)	2021	6	3	13	14	BPI: Gold	We're All Alone in This Together
"Flowers and the Snow"	2021	40	14	91	—		Independence Day
"14" (featuring Potter Payper)	2021	55	—	—	—		Independence Day
"Double Tap" (featuring Sus)	2021	73	—	—	—		Independence Day
"My Story"	2023	82	—	—	—		Unfinished Business
"—" denotes a recording that did not chart or was not released in that territory.

== Guest appearances ==
Title	Year	Other artist(s)	Album
"I'm The One"	2019	MoStack	Stacko
"No Lie"	2019	Blade Brown	Bags and Boxes 4
"Freddy"	2019	None	Top Boy – A Selection of Music Inspired by the Series
"County Lines, Pt. 2" (Remix)	2019	Frosty	Non-album remix
"Ended Up"	2020	GRM Daily	GRM 10
"In the Fire"	2021	Dave, Giggs, Ghetts, Meekz	We're All Alone In This Together
"Monday To Sunday"	2023	Clavish	Rap Game Awful
"Let it Go"	2024	Potter Payper	Nightmare Before Christmas
