= List of Official Albums Streaming Chart number ones of 2021 =

The Official Albums Streaming Chart is a weekly music chart in the United Kingdom which calculates the most popular albums on audio streaming sites.

== Number ones ==
Key
No.	nth album to top the Official Albums Streaming Chart
re	Return of an album to number one

Contents

No.	Artist (Note: The artist, song, date of reaching number one and number of weeks at number one are those given by the OCC.)	Album	Record label (Note: The record labels are those given by the OCC.)	Reached number one (for the week ending)	Weeks at number one	Ref.
re	Michael Bublé	Christmas	Reprise	7 January 2021	1	
re	Taylor Swift	Evermore	EMI	14 January 2021	1	
re	Pop Smoke	Shoot for the Stars, Aim for the Moon	Republic	21 January 2021	3	
re	Pop Smoke	Shoot for the Stars, Aim for the Moon	Republic	28 January 2021	3	
re	Pop Smoke	Shoot for the Stars, Aim for the Moon	Republic	4 February 2021	3	
70	Fredo	Money Can't Buy Happiness	Dave Neighbourhood/Since 93	11 February 2021	1	
71	The Weeknd	The Highlights	Republic/XO	18 February 2021	1	
re	Dua Lipa	Future Nostalgia	Warner	25 February 2021	2	
re	Dua Lipa	Future Nostalgia	Warner	4 March 2021	2	
72	Digga D	Made in the Pyrex	CGM	11 March 2021	1	
re	Dua Lipa	Future Nostalgia	Warner	18 March 2021	1	
73	Central Cee	Wild West	Central Cee	25 March 2021	1	
74	Justin Bieber	Justice	Def Jam	1 April 2021	3	
74	Justin Bieber	Justice	Def Jam	8 April 2021	3	
74	Justin Bieber	Justice	Def Jam	15 April 2021	3	
75	Taylor Swift	Fearless (Taylor's Version)	EMI	22 April 2021	1	
76	AJ Tracey	Flu Game	Revenge	29 April 2021	1	
re	Dua Lipa	Future Nostalgia	Warner	6 May 2021	1	
77	DJ Khaled	Khaled Khaled	Black Butter/We The Best	13 May 2021	1	
re	Dua Lipa	Future Nostalgia	Warner	20 May 2021	1	
78	J. Cole	The Off-Season	Interscope	27 May 2021	1	
79	Olivia Rodrigo	Sour	Geffen	3 June 2021	8	
79	Olivia Rodrigo	Sour	Geffen	10 June 2021	8	
79	Olivia Rodrigo	Sour	Geffen	17 June 2021	8	
79	Olivia Rodrigo	Sour	Geffen	24 June 2021	8	
79	Olivia Rodrigo	Sour	Geffen	1 July 2021	8	
79	Olivia Rodrigo	Sour	Geffen	8 July 2021	8	
79	Olivia Rodrigo	Sour	Geffen	15 July 2021	8	
79	Olivia Rodrigo	Sour	Geffen	22 July 2021	8	
80	KSI	All Over the Place	BMG	29 July 2021	1	
81	Dave	We're All Alone in This Together	Dave Neighbourhood	5 August 2021	2	
81	Dave	We're All Alone in This Together	Dave Neighbourhood	12 August 2021	2	
re	Olivia Rodrigo	Sour	Geffen	19 August 2021	3	
re	Olivia Rodrigo	Sour	Geffen	26 August 2021	3	
re	Olivia Rodrigo	Sour	Geffen	2 September 2021	3	
82	Kanye West	Donda	Def Jam	9 September 2021	1	
83	Drake	Certified Lover Boy	Ovo/Republic	16 September 2021	6	
83	Drake	Certified Lover Boy	Ovo/Republic	23 September 2021	6	
83	Drake	Certified Lover Boy	Ovo/Republic	30 September 2021	6	
83	Drake	Certified Lover Boy	Ovo/Republic	7 October 2021	6	
83	Drake	Certified Lover Boy	Ovo/Republic	14 October 2021	6	
83	Drake	Certified Lover Boy	Ovo/Republic	21 October 2021	6	
re	Adele	25	XL	28 October 2021	2	
re	Adele	25	XL	4 November 2021	2	
84	Ed Sheeran	=	Asylum	11 November 2021	2	
84	Ed Sheeran	=	Asylum	18 November 2021	2	
85	Taylor Swift	Red (Taylor's Version)	EMI	25 November 2021	1	
86	Adele	30	Columbia	2 December 2021	2	
86	Adele	30	Columbia	9 December 2021	2	
re	Ed Sheeran	=	Asylum	16 December 2021	1	
re	Michael Bublé	Christmas	Reprise	23 December 2021	2	
re	Michael Bublé	Christmas	Reprise	30 December 2021	2	
