= The Last One (album) =

Studio album by Headie One
- Released: 28 June 2024
- Genres: British hip-hop; UK drill
- Length: 68:00
- Labels: Columbia; Sony
- Producers: ADP; Ambezza; Aminé; Deats; Eight8; Einer Bankz; Elyas; Fridayy; Fwdslxsh; Harry Beech; IJD; Jim Legxacy; Ka7ton8; Kenny Beats; King Wizard; Lucas Secon; M1OnTheBeat; Mombru; NatsGotTracks; Nik D; Nineteen85; P2J; Pooh Beatz; Sammy Soso; Sampha; Skrillex; Sucuki; Tay Keith; Toddla T; Tommy Parker; TR The Producer; TSB; Willum Maindo; X10

Headie One chronology
Strength to Strength (2023)	The Last One (2024)

Singles from The Last One
- 1. "Martin's Sofa" Released: 19 January 2023; 2. "Cry No More" Released: 19 April 2024; 3. "I Still Know Better" Released: 7 June 2024; 4. "Tipsy" Released: 21 June 2024

The Last One is the second studio album by British rapper Headie One. It was released through Columbia Records and Sony Music UK on 28 June 2024. The album features guest appearances from Potter Payper, Stormzy, Tay Keith, Fridayy, Skrillex, AJ Tracey, Beam, Äyanna, D-Block Europe, Aitch, Bnxn, Odumodublvck, Tay Iwar, and Sampha. The album's production was handled by several producers such as Aminé, Einer Bankz, Lucas Secon, M1OnTheBeat, Nineteen85, and P2J, alongside several other producers including Tay Keith, Fridayy, Skrillex, and Sampha.

== Release and promotion ==
On 8 December 2022, Headie One released the non-album single, "50s" in which he hinted at the release of his second studio album and a collaborative mixtape which would end up being released as Strength to Strength with K-Trap. Weeks later, on 19 January 2023, Headie released the Flatbush Zombies' "Palm Trees" and Future's "Trap Niggas"-sampling lead single, "Martin's Sofa" alongside its official music video. Over a year later, following the release of Strength to Strength, Headie released the album's second single featuring Stormzy, "Cry No More". Alongside the single's release, he officially announced the album and made it available for pre-order, revealing a second cover art only available on CD. On 7 June 2024, Headie One released the album's third single, "I Still Know Better".

On 12 June 2024, Headie One appeared on the fourth episode of BET UK's Living Lyrics series as he performed "I Still Know Better" live. On 16 June, Headie officially announced the release of the album's fifteenth cut, "Tipsy", featuring Manchester-born rapper, Aitch. Just a day later, on 17 June, Headie officially announced his UK, Australia, and Ireland tour, beginning 4 October 2024 at Promiseland Festival in Gold Coast, Queensland, and concluding on 5 March 2025 at Plaza Club in Zürich. On 19 June, Headie released the album's official tracklist, followed by the release of "Tipsy" just two days later on 21 June.

Just four days prior to the album's official release, through Headie One's YouTube channel, he released a short film for the album directed by the former footballer-turned-actor, William Miller. The trailer sees Headie speak about his life experiences which have inspired the album's creation.

== Track listing ==
The Last One track listing
No.	Title	Writer(s)	Producer(s)	Length
1.	"I Could Rap"	Irving Adjei	M1OnTheBeat; King Wizard; X10	4:42
2.	"Love of My Life"	Adjei	Aminé	2:59
3.	"Martin's Sofa"	Adjei; Nayvadius Wilburn; Joshua Luellen; Antonio Lewis; Demetri Simms; Erick Elliott; Jeni Suk	M1OnTheBeat	4:00
4.	"I Still Know Better"	Adjei	King Wizard; IJD	3:22
5.	"Form 696"	Adjei	M1OnTheBeat; King Wizard; Jim Legxacy	3:02
6.	"Lonely" (featuring Potter Payper)	Adjei; Jamel Bousbaa	P2J; Sammy Soso	3:22
7.	"Recall/Why You Look so Tired"	Adjei	M1OnTheBeat; Jim Legxacy; Ka7ton8; NatsGotTracks; TR The Producer	4:38
8.	"Cry No More" (with Stormzy featuring Tay Keith)	Adjei; Michael Owuo Jr.	Tay Keith; Pooh Beatz; Tommy Parker	3:24
9.	"Karma"	Adjei	M1OnTheBeat; Leandro “Dro” Hidalgo^{[a]}	3:35
10.	"Soul to Keep" (featuring Fridayy)	Adjei; Francis Leblanc	Fridayy; ADP; Mombru	3:36
11.	"Happy Music"	Adjei	Ambezza; Deats; Elyas; Kenny Beats; Nik D; Sucuki	2:40
12.	"Make a W" (featuring Skrillex, AJ Tracey, and Beam)	Adjei; Sonny Moore; Ché Grant; Tyshane Thompson	Skrillex	2:57
13.	"Rapunzel" (featuring Äyanna)	Adjei; Äyanna Christie; Einer Bankz; Conran Doderer; Harry Beech	Einer Bankz; Eight8; Harry Beech	3:25
14.	"Braided" (featuring D-Block Europe)	Adjei; Adam Williams; Ricky Banton	Sammy Soso	3:48
15.	"Tipsy" (featuring Aitch)	Adjei; Harrison Armstrong; Thomas Bell; Samuel Awuku; Melissa Elliott; Timothy Mosley	Toddla T; Sammy Soso	2:49
16.	"Bounce" (featuring Bnxn)	Adjei; Daniel Benson	Lucas Secon	3:01
17.	"Purposeful" (featuring Odumodublvck)	Adjei; Tochukwu Ojogwu	Ambezza; Fwdslxsh; Willum Maindo	2:58
18.	"Guns & Money" (featuring Tay Iwar)	Adjei; Austin Iwar	Nineteen85; TSB	3:33
19.	"Memories" (featuring Sampha)	Adjei; Sampha Sisay	Sampha	3:08
20.	"I'm Thankful"	Adjei	Ambezza; Deats; Elyas; Nik D; Sucuki	3:05
Total length:				68:00

Notes

- ^{^[a]} signifies an additional producer

Sample credits

- "Martin's Sofa" contains a sample of "Palm Trees", written by Eric Elliott, Demetri O'Neal Simms, and Antonio Lewis, as performed by Flatbush Zombies; as well as a sample from "Trap Niggas", written by Nayvadius Wilburn, Joshua Luellen, and Jeni Suk, as performed by Future.
- "Cry No More" contains a sample of "Lonely at the Top", written by Ahmed Asake, as performed by Asake.

== Personnel ==
Musicians

- Headie One – rap vocals
- King Wizard – piano (4, 5), guitar (5), percussion (5), strings (5)
- Potter Payper – rap vocals (6)
- Stormzy – rap vocals (8)
- Calum Landau – programming (8)
- Fridayy – vocals (10)
- AJ Tracey – rap vocals (12)
- Beam – rap vocals (12)
- Äyanna – vocals (13)
- Young Adz – rap vocals (14)
- Dirtbike LB – rap vocals (14)
- Aitch – rap vocals (15)
- Bnxn – vocals (16)
- Ife Ogunjobi – trumpet (16)
- Odumodublvck – vocals (17)
- Tay Iwar – vocals (18)
- Sampha – vocals (19), piano (19), programming (19), synthesizer (19)
- Jonny Yeoman – saxophone (20)

Technical

- Colin Leonard – mastering
- Leandro "Dro" Hidalgo – mixing
- Skrillex – mixing (12)
- Charlie Rolfe – recording
- Liam Nolan – recording (8)

== Charts ==
Chart performance for The Last One
Chart (2024)	Peak position
UK Albums (Official Charts)	52
UK R&B Albums (Official Charts)	4
