= Chapter 16 =

Mixtape by Clavish
- Released: 17 May 2024
- Length: 64:21
- Label: Polydor; Universal Music UK
- Producer: Dinuzzo; Fridayy; Hal; JJ Beatz; Kewe Ahwinahwi; Khvn; KP Beatz; LiTek; OrWotProductions; R14 Beats; Sam Cliffe; Samuel Wierstra; SHK; WhyJay; Zemcoteam

Clavish chronology
| Rap Game Awful (2022) | Chapter 16 (2024) |

Singles from Chapter 16
- 1. "Tip Toes" Released: 7 September 2023; 2. "Top 2" Released: 19 October 2023; 3. "IDK" Released: 15 February 2024; 4. "Uh Uh" Released: 7 March 2024; 5. "10th Floor" Released: 18 April 2024; 6. "Most Definitely" Released: 9 May 2024; 7. "Last Night in Paris/Vartry Road" Released: 16 May 2024

Chapter 16 is the second mixtape by British rapper Clavish. It was released through Polydor Records and Universal Music UK on 17 May 2024. The mixtape features guest appearances from Bazz, D-Block Europe, Fredo, KayMuni, Kirky, Marnz Malone and Potter Payper and includes production from Fridayy, LiTek, R14 Beats, Sam Cliffe and WhyJay alongside several other producers.

Chapter 16 was supported by seven singles: "Tip Toes", "Top 2", "IDK", "Uh Uh", "10th Floor", "Most Definitely", and "Last Night in Paris/Vartry Road".

== Release and promotion ==
Clavish released the mixtape's lead single "Tip Toes" with Aitch on September 7, 2023, alongside its official music video. The mixtape's second single "Tip 2" was released just a month later of October 19. The mixtape's third single "IDK" was released months later to build hype for the mixtape on February 15, 2024. This was soon followed by the Fredo-accompanied "Uh Uh" just under a month later on March 7 alongside the mixtape's official announcement. The album's fifth single, "10th Floor" with Potter Payper was released on April 18, followed by the D-Block Europe-assisted "Most Definitely" on May 9. The mixtape's final two tracks, "Last Night in Paris" and "Vartry Road" were released on the night of its release on May 16.

Following the release of the mixtape, Clavish delivered visuals for the project's intro, "Food for Thought" on May 21.

== Tour ==
Chapter 16 Tour
- Tour by Clavish
- Associated album: Chapter 16
- Start date: September 16, 2024
- End date: September 30, 2024
- No. of shows: 10

Clavish concert chronology
- Rap Game Awful Tour (2022); Chapter 16 Tour (2024)

On May 13, 2024, Clavish announced his UK tour, a 10-date United Kingdom concert tour, in support of the album, beginning September 16, 2024, at SWG3 in Glasgow, and concluding September 30, 2024, at O2 Forum Kentish Town in London.

=== Shows ===
List of concerts, showing date, city, country, venue, and opening act
| Date | City | Country | Venue |
United Kingdom
| September 16, 2024 | Glasgow | Scotland | SWG3 Studio Warehouse |
| September 18, 2024 | Dublin | Republic of Ireland | Vicar Street |
| September 20, 2024 | Nottingham | England | Rock City |
| September 21, 2024 | Leeds | England | Leeds Stylus |
| September 23, 2024 | Newcastle | England | NX Newcastle |
| September 24, 2024 | Manchester | England | New Century Hall |
| September 25, 2024 | Birmingham | England | O2 Institute |
| September 28, 2024 | Leicester | England | O2 Academy Leicester |
| September 29, 2024 | Bristol | England | SWX |
| September 30, 2024 | London | England | O2 Forum Kentish Town |

== Track listing ==
Chapter 16 track listing
| No. | Title | Writer(s) | Producer(s) | Length |
|---|---|---|---|---|
| 1. | "Food For Thought" | Cian Wright | Samuel Wierstra | 10:37 |
| 2. | "10th Floor" (with Potter Payper) | Wright; Jamel Bousbaa | R14 Beats | 2:45 |
| 3. | "IDK" | Wright; Jay Duggal | R14 Beats; JJ Beatz | 3:18 |
| 4. | "Featuring Dave" | Wright | Samuel Wierstra^{[b]}; Hal^{[b]} | 3:18 |
| 5. | "Uh Uh" (with Fredo) | Wright; Marvin Bailey; Kyle Pearce | KP Beatz | 4:14 |
| 6. | "Wagon on My Neck" | Wright | R14 Beats | 2:54 |
| 7. | "Take You There" | Wright; Francis Leblanc; Darrien Overton | Fridayy^{[a]}; Dinuzzo | 3:43 |
| 8. | "Last Night in Paris" | Wright | SHK | 2:47 |
| 9. | "Most Definitely" (with D-Block Europe) | Wright; Adam Nathaniel Williams; Ricky Earl Banton; Ruslan Shakarov; Saidkhon Askarov; William Gaskins | OrWotProductions^{[c]}; Khvn^{[b]}; Zemcoteam^{[b]} | 3:26 |
| 10. | "Vartry Road" | Wright | Sam Cliffe^{[b]}; Kewe Ahwinahwi^{[b]} | 3:17 |
| 11. | "Tip Toes" (with Aitch) | Wright; Harrison Armstrong | LiTek^{[b]}; WhyJay^{[b]} | 2:44 |
| 12. | "Beep" (with Kirky and Bazz) | Wright; Kirky Thomas; Bazz | R14 Beats^{[b]}; Hal^{[b]} | 2:50 |
| 13. | "Top 2" | Wright | R14 Beats | 3:39 |
| 14. | "Loose Lips Sink Ships" (with KayMuni and Marnz Malone) | Wright; KayMuni; Kimani Shaw | | 4:42 |
| 15. | "Better Person" | Wright | JJ Beatz | 4:29 |
| 16. | "When It Rains, It Pours" | Wright | R14 Beats | 5:38 |
| Total length: | | | | 64:21 |

Notes

- ^{^[a]} signifies an additional producer
- ^{^[b]} signifies a co-producer
- ^{^[c]} signifies an uncredited producer

== Personnel ==
Musicians

- Clavish – vocals (all tracks)
- Potter Payper – vocals (2)
- Fredo – vocals (5)
- Young Adz – vocals (9)
- Dirtbike LB – vocals (9)
- Aitch – vocals (11)
- Bazz – vocals (12)
- Kirky – vocals (12)
- KayMuni – vocals (14)
- Marnz Malone – vocals (14)

Technical

- Matt Colton – mastering
- Manon Grandjean – mixing

== Charts ==
Chart performance for Chapter 16
| Chart (2024) | Peak position |
|---|---|
| UK Albums (OCC) | 30 |
| UK R&B Albums (OCC) | 3 |
