= Highlyy =

British singer (born 2003)

- Birth name: Highlyblessed Sandra Mazina
- Born: 13 December 2003 (age 21) London, U.K.
- Genres: Afrobeat; Afroswing; R&B; hip hop
- Occupations: Singer; songwriter; dancer
- Years active: 2022–present
- Labels: Universal Music

Highlyy (born 13 December 2003) is a British singer and songwriter.

== Early life ==
From Congolese heritage, Highlyy begun to sing at church and school choirs.

== Career ==
After her song "Soldier" gained virality on TikTok in 2022, at 18, she was invited by Oxlade to perform her first ever gig on stage at a sold-out UK show. In 2024, she collaborated with French rapper Rsko on the single "Passion".

== Personal life ==
Highlyy speaks English, French, Lingala, and Yoruba.

== Discography ==
Highlyy discography
- Studio albums: 0
- EPs: 1
- Singles: 6
- Music videos: 5

=== Extended plays ===
Title	Album details
+243	Released: 25 January 2024; Label: Universal Music; Formats: Digital download, streaming

=== Singles ===
==== As a lead artist ====
Title	Year	Peak chart positions	Album
Title	Year	UK Afrobeats	Album
"Soldier" (featuring Tion Wayne)	2022	7	+243
"Time Like This"	2023	—	Non-album single
"Peace"	2023	—	+243
"Higher (C'est la vie)"	2023	—	+243
"Passion"(featuring Rsko)	2024	—	+243
"I'm OK"	2024	—	Non-album single

==== As a featured artist ====
Title	Year	Album
"Hate" (Idman featuring Lojay & Highlyy)	2023	Non-album singles
"Call Me A Lioness" (Ellie Rowsell featuring Olivia Dean, Melanie C, Shura, Marika Hackman, Rachel Chinouriri, Jasmine Jethwa, Rose Gray, Highlyy, Al Greenwood & Self Esteem)	2023	Non-album single
"Plan" (Rsko featuring Highlyy)	2023	Memory
"Different" (K-Trap featuring Highlyy)	2024	Smile?
