= Smile? =

Studio album by K-Trap
- Released: 31 May 2024
- Length: 46:17
- Labels: Thousand8; EGA Records; UMG
- Producers: Angel; ATG; Da Beatfreakz; Carns Hill; Cole YoursTruly; Danesblood; Dirty Dave; Godwin Sonzi; Honeywoodsix; James Maddock; Jacob Manson; Jester Beats; Joe Stanley; LouisAura; LukasBL; M1OnTheBeat; Money Every; Nathaniel London; Prod Prince; R14 Beats; Sharna Bass; Tuffi; WhyJay; Wizzle; X10; Young Chencs

K-Trap chronology
Strength to Strength (2023)	Smile? (2024)

Singles from Smile?
- 1. "Heaven or Hell" Released: 8 February 2024; 2. "Old School Era" Released: 18 April 2024; 3. "Mobsters" Released: 2 May 2024; 4. "Victory Lap" Released: 23 May 2024; 5. "Whistle" Released: 30 May 2024

Smile? is the debut studio album by British rapper K-Trap. It was independently released through Thousand8, EGA Distro, and UMG on 31 May 2024. The album features guest appearances from Blade Brown, Sharna Bass, Dré Six, D-Block Europe, Highlyy and Angel. It includes production from Da Beatfreakz, Carns Hill, M1OnTheBeat, and WhyJay, alongside several other producers.

Smile? was supported by five singles: "Heaven or Hell", "Old School Era", "Mobsters", "Victory Lap", and "Whistle".

== Release and promotion ==
K-Trap released the album's lead single, "Heaven or Hell" on 8 February 2024, alongside its official music video. The album's second single, "Old School Era" was released on 18 April 2024, alongside the album's official announcement. "Mobsters", the album's third single featuring Blade Brown was released on May 2, 2024. The album's fourth single, "Victory Lap" was released on 23 May 2024; the track premiered on GRM Daily as a highly anticipated "Daily Duppy". Just a day later, on May 24, K-Trap had taken to his Instagram to release the album's tracklist before releasing the fifth and final single from the album, "Whistle", on May 30, just a day prior to the album's official release.

Following the album's release, K-Trap released the official music video for the album's fifteenth cut, "Whoosh". The video premiered on the GRM Daily YouTube channel on 3 June 2024.

== Tour ==
On 18 April 2024, K-Trap announced his UK tour alongside the release of his album, a 5-date United Kingdom concert tour, in support of the album, beginning September 1, 2024, at SWG3 in Glasgow, and concluding on 10 September 2024, at Roundhouse in London.

== Composition ==
Smile? consists of 19 standard songs and features 6 guest acts—the British rapper Blade Brown on the album's third single "Mobsters", Sharna Bass on the album's ninth cut, "Next To You", Dré Six on the album's tenth cut, "Thing For You, D-Block Europe on the album's fourteenth cut, "Rockstar in Designer", Highlyy on the album's sixteenth cut, "Different", and Angel on the album's seventeenth cut, "Let's Run Away". The album was written by K-Trap himself alongside featured artists and producers. On the album's intro and outro track, British radio DJ and presenter, Tiffany Calver delivers monologues that critics describe as "therapeutic".

The album's title, Smile? alludes to "pleasure, amusement, good intentions and belonging". On the album, K-Trap tackles the reality of his before-masked identity, noting that "with the mask on, I wouldn't be able to be the person I am now", alongside the struggles that come with being in the limelight and being a mainstream rapper in comparison to being underground. The album's lyrics contain meta-references to K-Trap's personal life, particularly referring to his mental health and his "complex emotional well-being". The album is described as a rebirth for the drill artist, showing K-Trap being "open and liberated" while breaking down what it means to be yourself.

The lyricism on the album suggests that he has outgrown his drill roots, however, suggests that he wants to stay true to them while also showing newfound vulnerability in the album.

== Critical reception ==
Professional ratings
Review scores
Source	Rating
NME	4/5 stars
The Line of Best Fit	8/10
The Observer	4/5 stars

K-Trap's Smile? received critical acclaim. Writing for NME, Kyann-Sian Williams wrote that throughout the album, "he takes you on a journey" and "touches on pivotal topics in his life" while describing the production as "ethereal". Williams concluded her review by writing: "Now that K-Trap has evolved and stands as a luminary in his scene, ‘Smile?’ inspires those like him – and others – to gently move on from their past and see the bright side of life. It’s OK to smile once in a while, he tells us". The Observer's Damien Morris wrote that "Perkins has always been brilliant at landing end syllables" while simultaneously "precisely conveying meaning". Morris wrote that there is "excellence" in K-Trap's storytelling ability while noting that his ability to boast about his extravagant lifestyle is "superb".

Matt Sharp for The Line of Best Fit wrote that "the comparison between the high-life, and [K-Trap's] life left behind on the streets, is forever engaging". Sharp highlighted "Thing for You" as a highlight of the album, stating that the South London-born rapper "delivers an insightful discussion" regarding his past and present life. He stated that in the album's second half, "we reach the height of the honesty and openness" that allows Smile? to stand out in comparison to previous projects. Concluding his review, Sharp wrote that "we slowly unlock more of the person we are talking to", alluding to K-Trap's true identity while describing the album as "a hugely compelling body of work". Writing for GRM Daily, Niall Smith described the album as "a brave, and oddly emotive record", stating that it cements K-Trap as "a standout spitter in rap’s pantheon".

== Track listing ==
Smile? track listing
No.	Title	Writer(s)	Producer(s)	Length
1.	"Intro"	Devonte Perkins; Jester Beats; Tiffany Calver	Jester Beats	0:48
2.	"Classic Day"	Perkins; Honeywoodsix; Cole Ostrin	Honeywoodsix; Cole YoursTruly	2:51
3.	"Victory Lap"	Perkins; Carns Hill	Carns Hill	2:00
4.	"Heaven or Hell"	Perkins; Jester; Godwin Sonzi; Nathaniel London	Jester Beats; Godwin Sonzi; Nathaniel London	2:31
5.	"Messi"	Perkins; Jester; R14 Beats	Jester Beats; R14 Beats	1:38
6.	"Mobsters" (with Blade Brown)	Perkins; Jonathan Wrate; Mozis Aduu; Freddie Poole	M1OnTheBeat; X10	2:19
7.	"Whistle"	Perkins; Valentino Salvi	Young Chencs; Danesblood; Dirty Dave	2:02
8.	"TBC"	Perkins; Lukas Leth; Prod Prince	LukasBL; Prod Prince; Tuffi	3:12
9.	"Next to You" (with Sharna Bass)	Perkins; Sharna Bass	Sharna Bass	2:12
10.	"Thing For You" (with Dré Six)	Perkins; Dré Six; Jester; James Maddock; Prod Prince	Jester Beats; James Maddock; Prod Prince	3:18
11.	"Old School Era"	Perkins; Jester; London; Joe Stanley	Jester Beats; Nathaniel London; Joe Stanley	2:15
12.	"Someone Familiar"	Perkins; Jacob Manson; Jacob Jones	Jacob Manson; WhyJay	1:55
13.	"Special"	Perkins; Jester	Jester Beats; Money Every	2:44
14.	"Rockstar in Designer" (with D-Block Europe)	Perkins; Adam Williams; Ricky Banton; Obi Ebele; Uche Ebele	Da Beatfreakz	3:01
15.	"Whoosh"	Perkins; Louis Egyin-Buadu	LouisAura	3:03
16.	"Different" (with Highlyy)	Perkins; Alexander Ogunmokun	ATG	3:14
17.	"Let's Run Away" (with Angel)	Perkins; Sirach Charles	Angel	3:14
18.	"Grown Decisions"	Perkins; Jester	Jester Beats; Wizzle	2:56
19.	"Outro"	Perkins; Jester; Calver	Jester Beats	0:56
Total length:				46:17

== Charts ==
Chart performance for Smile?
Chart (2024)	Peak position
UK Albums (Official Charts)	10
UK R&B Albums (Official Charts)	1
