= Kaash Paige =

American singer, rapper, and songwriter (born 2001)

- Born: D'Kyla Paige Woolen; January 8, 2001 (age 25); Dallas, Texas, U.S.
- Genres: R&B
- Occupations: Singer; rapper; songwriter
- Years active: 2018–present
- Labels: Se Lavi; Def Jam; Roc Nation; One Umbrella
- Website: kaashpaigemusic.com

D'Kyla Paige Woolen (born January 8, 2001), known professionally as Kaash Paige (a backronym for Kill All Arrogance, Stop Hatred), is an American singer, rapper, and songwriter from Dallas, Texas. She was signed to Se Lavi Productions and Def Jam Recordings and managed by Roc Nation. She released her debut extended play Parked Car Convos on November 15, 2019.

== Early life ==
D'Kyla Paige Woolen was born on January 8, 2001, in Dallas, Texas. She started writing and recording in high school, uploading tracks to SoundCloud, where she quickly gained a local following. She attended Mansfield Timberview High School in Arlington.

== Career ==
By early 2019, Paige had attracted attention from several record labels, and eventually landed a deal with Se Lavi Productions and Def Jam Recordings. The single "Love Songs" went viral on various social media platforms and spent six weeks at the top of Spotify's global viral chart, reaching Billboard's Hot R&B Songs chart. On November 15, 2019, she released her debut EP, Parked Car Convos. The remix of "Love Songs" was released in January 2020 featuring 6lack. In March 2020, she appeared on the track "Euphoria" with Don Toliver and Travis Scott. Her debut album, Teenage Fever, was released on August 14, 2020.

== Artistry ==
Woolen has cited Erykah Badu, Drake, Mac Miller, Isaiah Rashad, SZA, The Internet, Flatbush Zombies, and Frank Ocean as her musical influences.

== Personal life ==
Paige is bisexual.

== Discography ==
=== Studio albums ===
List of studio albums, with selected details
Title	Details	Peak chart positions
Title	Details	US Heat.
Teenage Fever	Released: August 14, 2020; Format: LP, digital download, streaming; Label: Se Lavi, Def Jam	2
S2ML	Released: November 18, 2022; Format: Digital download, streaming; Label: Se Lavi, Def Jam	—

=== Extended plays ===
Title	EP details	Peak chart positions
Title	EP details	US Heat.
Parked Car Convos	Released: November 15, 2019; Label: Se Lavi, Def Jam; Format: Digital download, streaming	15

=== Singles ===
==== As lead artist ====
Title	Year	Peak chart positions				Certifications	Album
Title	Year	US Bub.	US R&B	US R&B /HH Bub.	CAN	Certifications	Album
"Love Songs" (solo or remix with 6lack)	2018	10	15	2	66	BPI: Silver; RIAA: Platinum	Parked Car Convos
"Happy Song"	2019	—	—	—	—		Non-album single
"64'"	2019	—	—	—	—		Parked Car Convos
"Heartbreaker"	2019	—	—	—	—		Parked Car Convos
"Jaded"	2020	—	—	—	—		Teenage Fever
"London"	2020	—	—	—	—		Teenage Fever
"Problems" (featuring Isaiah Rashad)	2020	—	—	—	—		Teenage Fever
"Bad Girl" (with Strick)	2021	—	—	—	—		Strick Land
"Girlfriend"	2022	—	—	—	—		S2ML
"24 Hrs" (featuring Lil Tjay)	2022	—	—	—	—		S2ML
"Miss My Dawgs" (with 6LACK)	2022	—	—	—	—		S2ML
"Doubted Me"	2022	—	—	—	—		S2ML
"—" denotes a recording that did not chart.

==== As featured artist ====
Title	Year	Album
"Unbelievable" (24kGoldn featuring Kaash Paige)	2020	Non-album single
"On My Sleeve" (Scribz Riley featuring Kaash Paige)	2020	Wish Me Luck
"All About Cake" (KyleYouMadeThat featuring Coi Leray and Kaash Paige)	2021	Non-album single

==== Promotional singles ====
Title	Year	Album
"DND"	2016	Non-album promotional singles
"Wyca" (with Da Dreak)	2019	Non-album promotional singles
"Sobriety"	2020	Non-album promotional singles
"Orange Sweater"	2020	Non-album promotional singles
"Frank Ocean"	2020	Non-album promotional singles

=== Other charted songs ===
Title	Year	Peak chart positions		Album
Title	Year	US Bub.	NZ Hot	Album
"Euphoria" (Don Toliver featuring Travis Scott and Kaash Paige)	2020	3	15	Heaven or Hell

=== Guest appearances ===
List of non-single guest appearances, showing other artist(s), year released and album name
Title	Year	Other artist(s)	Album
"Wasted Energy (Remix)"	2020	Alicia Keys, Diamond Platnumz	Alicia
"Cold"	2020	Headie One	Edna
"Memphganistan"	2021	Moneybagg Yo	A Gangsta's Pain
"Angels"	2021	Tinashe	333
"Fuck Alone (Remix)"	2022	Imani Williams	Non-album song
"Trying"	2023	Clavish	Rap Game Awful
"Open It Up"	2025	SoFaygo	Mania
