= Thanks for Hating =

Mixtape by Potter Payper
- Released: 23 February 2024
- Length: 48:21
- Label: 36 The Label; EGA Records; UMG
- Producer: Aaron Goedluck; Archer Hill; Ari Beats; Chapo; Chucks; DJ Fricktion; Harry Beech; Honeywoodsix; Likkle Dotz OTB; Lucidbeatz; Manson Beats; Prod GX; Scott Supreme; S Finesse; Yung Swisher; Zyan

Potter Payper chronology
| Real Back in Style (2023) | Thanks for Hating (2024) |

Singles from Thanks for Hating
- 1. "Trench P (London City)" Released: January 4, 2024; 2. "Sinaloa Cartel" Released: February 1, 2024; 3. "Love Me How" Released: February 15, 2024; 4. "Midas Touch" Released: February 22, 2024

Thanks for Hating is the seventh full-length studio mixtape by British hip hop artist Potter Payper, released through 36 The Label, EGA Records and UMG on February 23, 2024. The mixtape is a follow-up to his debut full-length studio album, Real Back in Style in May 2023. The album features guest appearances from ADMT, Born Trappy, Clavish, Daff, Headie One, Marnz Malone, Nafe Smallz, Slim, KayMuni, KB, Millyz, and Mozzy, alongside production from Aaron Goedluck, Chucks, Harry Beech, Manson Beats, and Scott Supreme, alongside several other producers.

== Critical reception ==
Professional ratings
Review scores
| Source | Rating |
|---|---|
| Clash | 8/10 |

Thanks for Hating received positive reviews from critics. Writing for Clash, Shanté Collier-McDermott wrote that "the more we see from Potter Payper, the more his status as one of best lyricists within the UK is solidified". She wrote that the mixtape "feels like a collection of statements" and that with the project, we're reminded of "how well he raps" and "his authentic journey", describing Potter as the "crème de crème of the UK rap space".

== Track listing ==
Thanks for Hating track listing
| No. | Title | Writer(s) | Producer(s) | Length |
|---|---|---|---|---|
| 1. | "Inaugural" | Jamel Bousbaa | | 2:39 |
| 2. | "Trench P (London City)" | Bousbaa; Manson Beats; Philipp Riebenstahl | Manson Beats; Yung Swisher | 3:01 |
| 3. | "Drive By" (with Slim) | Bousbaa; Jordan Williams; Chucks; Honeywoodsix | Chucks; Honeywoodsix | 2:31 |
| 4. | "Midas Touch" (with ADMT) | Bousbaa; Adam Taylor; DJ Fricktion | DJ Fricktion | 3:20 |
| 5. | "Free Daff" (with Mozzy and Daff) | Bousbaa; Timothy Patterson; Daff; Chucks; Honeywoodsix | Chucks; Honeywoodsix | 3:19 |
| 6. | "Head Knees & Shoulders" (with Clavish) | Bousbaa; Cian Wright; Chucks; Ari Nijamx | Chucks; Ari Beats | 2:14 |
| 7. | "Thanks for Waiting" | Bousbaa; S Finesse | S Finesse | 3:05 |
| 8. | "Kid In a Court" | Bousbaa; Prod GX | Prod GX | 2:26 |
| 9. | "Pressure Makes Diamonds" (with Millyz and Born Trappy) | Bousbaa; Myles Lockwood; Born Trappy; Prod GX | Prod GX | 2:57 |
| 10. | "Free KayMuni" (with KayMuni and KB) | Bousbaa; KayMuni; KB; Archer Hill | Archer Hill | 2:56 |
| 11. | "Sinaloa Cartel" | Bousbaa; Chapo; Zyan | Chapo; Zyan | 2:04 |
| 12. | "Rappers Will Be Rappers" | Bousbaa; Christopher Ellington | Likkle Dotz OTB | 2:04 |
| 13. | "My Aunty Gave Me Legal Aid" | Bousbaa; Chucks | Chucks | 1:54 |
| 14. | "59901R" (with Headie One) | Bousbaa; Irving Adjei; Honeywoodsix | Honeywoodsix | 2:46 |
| 15. | "Love Me How" | Bousbaa; Chucks; Lucidbeatz | Chucks; Lucidbeatz | 2:30 |
| 16. | "Free Double M" (with Marnz Malone) | Bousbaa; Kimani Shaw; Scott Supreme; Harry Beech | Scott Supreme; Harry Beech | 2:56 |
| 17. | "My City's Not Safe" | Bousbaa; Chucks; Honeywoodsix | Chucks; Honeywoodsix | 2:49 |
| 18. | "Thanks for Hating" (with Nafe Smallz) | Bousbaa; Nathan Adams; Aaron Goedluck | Aaron Goedluck | 3:00 |
| Total length: | | | | 48:21 |

== Charts ==
Chart performance for Thanks for Hating
| Chart (2024) | Peak position |
|---|---|
| Scottish Albums (OCC) | 3 |
| UK Albums (OCC) | 5 |
| UK R&B Albums (OCC) | 1 |
