= Strength to Strength =

Mixtape by Headie One and K-Trap

Mixtape by Headie One and K-Trap
- Released: September 22, 2023
- Length: 31:53
- Label: One Records; Thousand8
- Producer: Carns Hill; Ghosty; Jaiah; Jayblu; Likkle Dotz OTB; M1OnTheBeat; Roddy Beatz; Tyrell 169; X10

Headie One chronology
No Borders: European Compilation Project (2022)	Strength to Strength (2023)	The Last One (2024)

K-Trap chronology
The Last Whip II (2022)	Strength to Strength (2023)	Smile? (2024)

Singles from Strength to Strength
- 1. "Catfish" Released: September 10, 2023; 2. "Park Chinois" Released: September 14, 2023; 3. "Triple Threat" Released: September 21, 2023

Strength to Strength is a collaborative mixtape between British rappers Headie One and K-Trap. It was released on September 22, 2023, through Headie One's record label One Records and K-Trap's record label Thousand8. The mixtape features two guest appearances from Clavish and M1OnTheBeat. The production was handled by Carns Hill, M1OnTheBeat, Tyrell 169, and several other well-respected producers.

Strength to Strength was supported by three singles: "Catfish", "Park Chinois", and "Triple Threat".

== Release and promotion ==
Headie One first hinted at the release of the mixtape on his singles "50s" in which he rapped: "Anyway, back to the matter, I might drop a joint tape with shh", alluding to an unreleased collaborative mixtape which would eventually be revealed as Strength to Strength. The mixtape's lead single, "Catfish" premiered on GRM Daily as a joint daily duppy between the two artists on September 10, 2023. On the same day, the two announced the release of the mixtape. The mixtape's second single, "Park Chinois" was released on September 14, accompanied by an official mixtape announcement. On September 21, just a day prior to the mixtape's release, the project's third single, "Triple Threat" with Clavish was released.

== Year-end lists ==
Select year-end rankings of Strength to Strength
Publication	List	Rank	Ref.
Complex UK	The Best Albums of 2023	1	

== Track listing ==
Strength to Strength track listing
No.	Title	Writer(s)	Producer(s)	Length
1.	"Park Chinois"	Irving Adjei; Devonte Perkins	Carns Hill	3:22
2.	"Catfish" (with M1OnTheBeat)	Adjei; Perkins	M1OnTheBeat	2:26
3.	"Trending Topic"	Adjei; Perkins	M1OnTheBeat; Jaiah; Tyrell 169; X10	3:45
4.	"Apple Pay"	Adjei; Perkins	Tyrell 169	3:07
5.	"Triple Threat" (with Clavish)	Adjei; Perkins; Cian Wright	M1OnTheBeat; Ghosty; Likkle Dotz OTB	3:17
6.	"Good Girls..."	Adjei; Perkins	Likkle Dotz OTB	3:16
7.	"Lace Them Up"	Adjei; Perkins	M1OnTheBeat; X10	3:05
8.	"ANPR"	Adjei; Perkins	Tyrell 169; X10; Roddy Beatz	3:06
9.	"Strength to Strength"	Adjei; Perkins	Tyrell 169; X10; Jayblu	3:07
10.	"Street X Industry"	Adjei; Perkins	M1OnTheBeat	3:22
Total length:				31:53

== Charts ==
Chart performance for Strength to Strength
Chart (2023)	Peak position
UK Albums (OCC)	4
UK R&B Albums (OCC)	1
