= Rap Game Awful =

2023 album by Clavish

Mixtape by Clavish
- Released: 13 January 2023
- Length: 89:32
- Label: Polydor; Universal Music UK
- Producer: Aifo; AyeTM; Chek Beatz; Disco; Elyas; Eugene Tsai; The FaNaTiX; GO Beatz; Hal; HARGO; Harry Beech; Hazey Just Landed; HD Beats; Hoskins; ID Crysis; JJ Beatz; Joe Reeves; Kazza; Kieran Nash; Kyle Evans; Lia Liza; M1OnTheBeat; Mack Jamieson; Madz Thomas; Makenobeats; Nick French; ODZZ; Off & Out; Omar Guetfa; Prince Galalie; R14 Beats; Simon Crisp; SK the Plug; svdominik; TN 490; Two Inch Punch

Clavish chronology
| 2022 (2021) | Rap Game Awful (2023) | Chapter 16 (2024) |

Singles from Rap Game Awful
- 1. "Greece" Released: 19 May 2022; 2. "Public Figure" Released: 22 September 2022; 3. "NRF Freestyle" Released: 16 October 2022; 4. "Rocket Science" Released: 17 November 2022; 5. "Traumatised" Released: 5 January 2023; 6. "No Difference" Released: 12 January 2023

Rap Game Awful is the debut mixtape by British rapper Clavish. It was released through Polydor Records and Universal Music UK on 13 January 2023. The mixtape features guest appearances from D-Block Europe, Fredo, Frosty, Rimzee, Tiny Boost, Youngs Teflon, Tiggs da Author, MoStack, Teeway, Kirky, Jordan, and Kaash Paige.

Rap Game Awful was supported by six singles: "Greece", "Public Figure", "NRF Freestyle", "Rocket Science" featuring D-Block Europe, "Traumatised", and "No Difference".

== Release and promotion ==
On 19 May 2022, Clavish released the mixtape's lead single, "Greece." The song proceeded to peak at number 70 on the UK Singles Chart. The mixtape's second single "Public Figure" was released on 22 September 2022. It proceeded to peak at #66 on the Official UK Charts. The mixtape's third single "NRF Freestyle" was released on 16 October 2022.

On 15 November 2022, through Instagram, Clavish announced the release of the mixtape alongside him previewing the tracklist with features such as Frosty, D-Block Europe, Fredo, Rimzee, Tiny Boost, Youngs Teflon, Tiggs da Author, MoStack, Teeway, Kirky, Jordan, and Kaash Paige.

The D-Block Europe-assisted "Rocket Science" was released on 17 November 2022, as the mixtape's fourth single; the success of the song marked Clavish's highest charting single at #9 on the Official UK Charts.

On 3 December 2022, Clavish announced a UK tour which would see him in vastly populated cities such as Birmingham, Dublin, Glasgow, London, and Manchester. A week later, another London date was added due to the tour's high demand.

The mixtape's fifth single "Traumatised" was released on 5 January 2023, just over a week prior to its release. A day before the release, on 12 January 2023, the mixtape's sixth and final single "No Difference" was released.

=== Tour ===
Rap Game Awful Tour
- Tour by Clavish
- Associated album: Rap Game Awful
- Start date: 13 March 2023
- End date: 29 March 2023
- No. of shows: 9

On 3 December 2022, Clavish announced the Rap Game Awful Tour, a 4-date United Kingdom concert tour, in support of the album, beginning 20 March 2023, at Dublin Green Room in Dublin, and concluding 28 March 2023, at O2 Academy Islington in London. Due to popular demand, five more shows were added. After being edited, the tour would start on 13 March 2023, at the Trinity Centre in Bristol and would conclude on 28 March 2023, at O2 Academy Islington in London.

==== Shows ====
List of concerts, showing date, city, country, venue, and opening act
| Date | City | Country | Venue |
United Kingdom
| 13 March 2023 | Bristol | England | Trinity Centre |
| 15 March 2023 | Leicester | England | O2 Academy 2 |
| 18 March 2023 | Newcastle | England | Newcastle University |
| 20 March 2023 | Dublin | Republic of Ireland | Academy Main Room |
| 22 March 2023 | Glasgow | Scotland | SWG3 Studio Warehouse |
| 23 March 2023 | Manchester | England | Academy 2 |
| 27 March 2023 | Birmingham | England | O2 Academy 3 |
| 28 March 2023 | London | England | O2 Academy Islington |
| 29 March 2023 | London | England | O2 Academy Islington |

== Critical reception ==
Professional ratings
Review scores
| Source | Rating |
|---|---|
| The Guardian | 3/5 stars |
| NME | 4/5 stars |
| The Observer | 4/5 stars |
| Pitchfork | 6.6/10 |

Rap Game Awful received positive reviews from music critics. Fred Garratt-Stanley from NME notes that "Clavish peppers an eclectic range of beats with clear, cutting, confessional verses." He follows up on this by stating "the tape is a lingering sense of darkness; his stories of prison, gang crime, and betrayal are given an extra bite by ominous, yet stripped-back instrumentals that offer Clavish space to bar and echo the murkiness of early drill heavyweights like 67 and Harlem Spartans." Concluding his review, Garratt-Stanley notes that "the powerful sense of emotion echoed across Rap Game Awful is what makes the mixtape so memorable" and that "If he learns to refine his output a little, there’s no reason Clavish can’t achieve the levels of stardom he’s been tipped to reach." Damien Morris from The Observer noted that "the north London rapper has been carefully nurtured for success over the past two years." He concluded his review as he wrote "the chill, sparse productions foreground Clavish’s economical delivery beautifully, as he flirts with imploring vulnerability and vicious querulousness without ever committing to either." Writing for The Guardian, Alexis Petridis states that "his worldview is strikingly drawn and bleak, devoid of politicking, expressions of anger at societal injustice or indeed optimism." This is followed by Petridis noting that "all this is rendered in a genuinely skilled and original voice, the subtle idiosyncrasies of his flow pointed up by the guest appearances." He concluded his review as he wrote, "he’s abundantly talented, a singular and austerely powerful voice."

== Commercial performance ==
Rap Game Awful debuted at number four on the UK Albums Chart, selling 5,070 album-equivalent units in the first week, becoming Clavish's first top-ten album. The sales consisted of 4,356 from streams, 585 from physical copies and 129 from downloads. Singles "Greece", "Public Figure" and three other songs from the albums charted on the UK Singles Chart: "Greece" (77), "Public Figure" (66), "Rocket Science" (9), "Traumatised" (63), and "No Difference" (57).

== Track listing ==
Rap Game Awful track listing
| No. | Title | Writer(s) | Producer(s) | Length |
|---|---|---|---|---|
| 1. | "Rap Game Intro" | Cian Wright | Elyas; Eugene Tsai; Hoskins; Nick French | 5:34 |
| 2. | "NRF Freestyle" | Wright | GO Beatz; HD Beats | 3:15 |
| 3. | "No Difference" | Wright | Off & Out; R14 Beats | 3:32 |
| 4. | "Monday to Sunday" (featuring Fredo) | Wright; Marvin William Bailey | Disco; R14 Beats | 3:46 |
| 5. | "Rap Game Awful" | Wright | Hazey Just Landed | 2:55 |
| 6. | "Public Figure" | Wright | Makenobeats | 2:55 |
| 7. | "She Wanna" (featuring Frosty) | Wright; Theo Beckford | Kyle Evans | 3:33 |
| 8. | "B22 Money" | Wright | HD Beats | 3:11 |
| 9. | "Rocket Science" (featuring D-Block Europe) | Wright; Adam Nathaniel Williams; Ricky Earl Banton | Kazza; Madz Thomas | 3:21 |
| 10. | "Rap Game Honest" | Wright | Hazey Just Landed | 2:48 |
| 11. | "4 of Us" (featuring Rimzee, Tiny Boost and Young Teflon) | Wright; Ricardo Miles; Daniel Collins; Jimi Aseru | HD Beats | 4:53 |
| 12. | "Greece" | Wright | HARGO; Kyle Evans | 2:40 |
| 13. | "1 More Than 6" | Wright | Aifo^{[b]}; HD Beats | 2:50 |
| 14. | "Roll with a G" (featuring Tiggs Da Author) | Wright; Adam Muhabwa | Mack Jamieson; TN 490^{[a]}; Two Inch Punch | 2:51 |
| 15. | "Can't Style Me" (featuring MoStack) | Wright; Montell Samuel Daley | M1OnTheBeat | 3:27 |
| 16. | "Told You So" | Wright | ID Crysis^{[a]}; Prince Galalie | 2:19 |
| 17. | "That's Silly" | Wright | Hazey Just Landed | 3:16 |
| 18. | "Mariah Carey" (featuring Teeway) | Wright; Tom Wayne | Joe Reeves^{[a]}; Kyle Evans | 4:07 |
| 19. | "Ages Ago" | Wright | The FaNaTiX | 2:08 |
| 20. | "Traumatised" | Wright; Bob Robinson; John Charles Barrett; Joseph Longo; Mark Althavan Andrews; Marquis Collins; Draco Cornelius Rosa Suárez; Tim Kelly | Chek Beatz | 2:57 |
| 21. | "Enemies" (featuring Kirky) | Wright; Kirky Thomas | AyeTM; Omar Guetfa; svdominik | 3:07 |
| 22. | "No Interview" | Wright | Simon Crisp | 2:50 |
| 23. | "FR" | Wright | Hal^{[a]}; JJ Beatz^{[a]} | 3:01 |
| 24. | "Ideal World" (featuring Jordan) | Wright; Jordan Mccan | SK the Plug | 2:43 |
| 25. | "Selling Dreams" | Wright | Harry Beech; Kieran Nash; R14 Beats | 2:39 |
| 26. | "Trying" (featuring Kaash Paige) | Wright; D'Kyla Paige Woolen | ODZZ | 3:18 |
| 27. | "22 Missed Calls" | Wright | Hoskins; Nick French | 1:53 |
| 28. | "Rap Game Outro" | Wright | Eugene Tsai; Hoskins; Lia Liza; Nick French | 3:37 |
| Total length: | | | | 89:32 |

Notes

- ^{^[a]} signifies an additional producer
- ^{^[b]} signifies a co-producer

Sample credits

- "Traumatised" contains a sample of "Thong Song" as performed by Sisqó, written by Mark Andrews, Draco Rosa, Bob Robinson and Tim Kelley.

== Personnel ==
Musicians

- Clavish – vocals (all tracks)
- R14 Beats – drum programming (3)
- Frosty – vocals (7)
- Young Adz – vocals (9)
- Dirtbike LB – vocals (9)
- Rimzee – vocals (11)
- Tiny Boost – vocals (11)
- Youngs Teflon – vocals (11)
- Tiggs Da Author – vocals (14)
- Two Inch Punch – bass, – synthesizer (14)
- Mack Jamieson – guitar (14)
- TN 490 – programming (14)
- MoStack – vocals (15)
- Teeway – vocals (18)
- Kirky – vocals (21)
- AyeTM – drums, rhythm arrangement (21)
- JJ Beatz – bass, drums (23)
- Jordan – vocals (24)
- Kaash Paige – vocals (26)

Technical

- Eli Crossan – assistant mixing (6)
- Lilian Nuthall – assistant mixing (6)
- Dante "PR" Vicens – recording (9)
- Matt Colton – mastering (2, 6, 9, 12)
- LiTek – mixing (12)
- Henri Davies – recording (14)
- Nick French – recording (14)
- Jake Jones – recording (5, 11, 15)
- Prince Galalie – recording (16)
- Manon Grandjean – mixing (2, 9, 20)
- Matt Doughty – mixing (22)
- Jeremy Cooper – mastering (22)
- Manon Grandjean – mixing (2–5, 7–11, 13–15, 17, 19–21, 23, 24)
- Nathan Boddy – mixing (1, 6, 16, 18, 25–28)
- Stuart Hawkes – mastering (1, 3–5, 7, 8, 10, 11, 13–21, 23–28)
- Benjamin Stokes – recording (3, 5–8, 10, 13, 14, 17–23, 26–28)

== Charts ==
Chart performance for Rap Game Awful
| Chart (2023) | Peak position |
|---|---|
| Irish Albums (OCC) | 31 |
| UK Albums (OCC) | 4 |
| UK R&B Albums (OCC) | 1 |

== Certifications ==
| Region | Certification | Certified units/sales |
|---|---|---|
| United Kingdom (BPI) | Silver | 60,000^{‡} |
^{‡} Sales+streaming figures based on certification alone.
