= Love Songs (Kaash Paige song) =

2018 single by Kaash Paige

Single by Kaash Paige

from the album Parked Car Convos
- Released: November 19, 2018
- Genre: R&B
- Length: 2:29
- Label: Def Jam
- Songwriters: Dkyla Woolen; Yndi Ferreira
- Producer: Dream Koala

Kaash Paige singles chronology
"Love Songs" (2018)	"Happy Song" (2019)

Music video
- "Love Songs" on YouTube

"Love Songs" is a song by American singer-songwriter Kaash Paige. The song was originally released on SoundCloud on October 8, 2018, but was released on all digital and streaming platforms on November 19, 2018. The single became trending on the video-sharing platform TikTok in late 2019. A remix featuring fellow R&B singer 6lack was released on January 28, 2020, available on all digital and streaming platforms. The single samples Dream Koala's 2012 song "We Can't Be Friends."

"Love Songs" has since peaked at number 10 on the Billboard Bubbling Under Hot 100 charts in the United States and number 66 on the Canadian Hot 100 in the Canada.

== Composition and lyrics ==
During an interview with Genius, Paige stated that she was inspired to make the song when she heard Doja Cat's 2014 song "No Police," claiming "This is a fire beat. It's like a fire melody. I was like bro, I gotta make a part two. I had to make a part two." Ironically, Paige declares that she really doesn't like love songs, but the song lyrics just came to her while vacuuming.

== Critical reception ==
Pete Freedman of Central Track awarded the song 'Song Of The Day,' writing, "That mindset paid off with this track, for sure. With its Chance The Rapper-nodding lyrics sung in an alluring but unconventional tone that we can’t help but think was at least a little influenced by another notable area performer, the Dream Koala-produced cut isn’t the shallow offering you’d perhaps expect from a performer as young as Kaash Paige is. Quite the opposite, actually: “Love Songs” rather deftly laments the fact that our heroine is resigned to singing love songs in order to pretend that her current relationship isn’t quite as rosy in real life as it looks on paper."

== Charts ==
Chart (2019–2020)	Peak position
Canada Hot 100 (Billboard)	66
US Bubbling Under Hot 100 (Billboard)	10
US Bubbling Under R&B/Hip-Hop Singles (Billboard)	2
US Hot R&B Songs (Billboard)	15

=== Year-end charts ===
Chart (2020)	Position
US Hot R&B Songs (Billboard)	37

== Certifications ==
Region	Certification	Certified units/sales
Brazil (Pro-Música Brasil)	Diamond	160,000^{‡}
France (SNEP)	Gold	100,000^{‡}
New Zealand (RMNZ)	2× Platinum	60,000^{‡}
United Kingdom (BPI)	Gold	400,000^{‡}
United States (RIAA)	Platinum	1,000,000^{‡}
^{‡} Sales+streaming figures based on certification alone.

== Release history ==
Region	Date	Format(s)	Label(s)	Ref.
Various	November 19, 2018	Digital download; streaming		

== 6LACK Remix ==
"Love Songs (Remix)"

Single by Kaash Paige featuring 6LACK
- Released: January 28, 2020
- Length: 2:30
- Label: Def Jam
- Songwriters: Dkyla Woolen; Yndi Ferreira; Ricardo Valentine
- Producer: Dream Koala

6lack singles chronology
"Touch & Go" (2019)	"Love Songs (Remix)" (2020)	"ATL Freestyle" (2020)

The official remix was released on January 28, 2020 on all digital and streaming services.

=== Critical response ===
Carson Cooper of Intersect Magazine stated that "The song puts listeners in a very relaxed mood; the tempo is not too fast or too slow and the instrumentation gives a chill factor millennials are accustomed to hearing. It fits into the typical modern R&B mold, giving us a lax background to words that aren’t all that complex. It’s very laid back and offers a sound that almost melts. The sound is very sexy like your typical 6LACK song, so Kaash Paige’s sound meshes perfectly. The song earns an 8/10 on Intersect's rating scale."
