= Rocket Science (Clavish song) =

2022 song by Clavish

Single by Clavish featuring D-Block Europe

from the album Rap Game Awful
- Released: November 17, 2022
- Length: 3:22
- Label: Polydor; Universal Music UK
- Songwriters: Cian Wright; Adam Williams; Ricky Banton
- Producers: Kazza; Madz Thomas

Clavish singles chronology
"NRF Freestyle" (2022)	"Rocket Science" (2022)	"Traumatised" (2023)

D-Block Europe singles chronology
"4 the Win" (2022)	"Rocket Science" (2022)	"Tears in My Amiri's" (2023)

Music video
- "Rocket Science" on YouTube

"Rocket Science" is a song by British rapper Clavish featuring British hip hop collective, D-Block Europe. It was released on November 17, 2022, as the fourth single from Clavish's debut mixtape album Rap Game Awful. The song was produced by Kazza and Madz Thomas.

== Critical reception ==
Writing for NME, in a review, Fred Garratt-Stanley noted that the track has, "clear, cutting, confessional verses." The Observer's Damien Morris writes that the track, "benefits hugely from Young Adz’s alien Auto-Tune coos," however, "the chill, sparse productions foreground Clavish’s economical delivery beautifully, as he flirts with imploring vulnerability and vicious querulousness without ever committing to either."

== Music video ==
The Toxic-directed music video sees Clavish surrounded by cars, women, and jewellery as he boasts his affluence alongside Young Adz and Dirtbike LB.

== Personnel ==
Credits and personnel adapted from Tidal.

Musicians

- Cian "Clavish" Wright – lead artist, songwriter, composer
- Adam "Young Adz" Williams – lead artist, songwriter, composer
- Ricky "Dirtbike LB" Banton – lead artist, songwriter, composer

Technical

- Dante "PR" Vicens – recording engineer
- Matt Colton – mastering engineer
- Manon Grandjean – mixing engineer

== Charts ==
Chart performance for "Rocket Science"
Chart (2022)	Peak position
Ireland (IRMA)	40
UK Singles (OCC)	9
UK Hip Hop/R&B (OCC)	3
