= No Difference =

2023 song by Clavish

Single by Clavish

from the album Rap Game Awful
- Released: January 12, 2023
- Length: 3:33
- Label: Polydor; Universal Music UK
- Songwriter: Cian Wright
- Producers: Off & Out; R14 Beats; TREVBAJ

Clavish singles chronology
"Traumatised" (2023)	"No Difference" (2023)	"100mph Freestyle x3" (2023)

Music video
- "No Difference" on YouTube

"No Difference" is a song by British rapper Clavish. It was released on January 12, 2023, as the sixth single from Clavish's debut mixtape album Rap Game Awful. The song was produced by Off & Out, R14 Beats, and TREVBAJ.

== Critical reception ==
Writing for The Guardian, Alex Petridids stated that the track "tells you something about how hotly tipped he is" as normally labels would censor some of the lyrics Clavish rapped.

== Music video ==
The TV Toxicc-directed music video sees Clavish in different sceneries ranging from ice-cold Tundras to Deserts in Dubai as he boasts his extravagant lifestyle, flexing cars, money, and jewellery in the process.

== Personnel ==
Credits and personnel adapted from Tidal.

Musicians

- Cian "Clavish" Wright – lead artist, songwriter, composer

Technical

- Benjamin Stokes – recording engineer
- Matt Colton – mastering engineer
- Manon Grandjean – mixing engineer

== Charts ==
Chart performance for "No Difference"
Chart (2023)	Peak position
UK Singles (OCC)	57
UK Hip Hop/R&B (OCC)	32
