= K-Trap =

British rapper and songwriter

- Born: Devonte Kasi Martin Perkins; 21 October 1995 (age 30); Lambeth, London, England
- Origin: Gipsy Hill, London, England
- Genres: British hip hop; UK drill; road rap
- Occupations: Rapper; songwriter
- Years active: 2013–present
- Labels: Thousand8 (current); Black Butter Records; Just Jam
- Website: ktrapofficial.com

Devonte Kasi Martin Perkins (born 21 October 1995), known professionally as K-Trap, is an English rapper and songwriter from South London. He is known for his prominence in the UK drill scene, releasing notable mixtapes such as The Last Whip (2017), The Re-Up (2018) and No Magic (2019). Previously, K-Trap was widely known for wearing a balaclava to conceal his identity until June 2019 when he revealed his face for the first time in the music video for his single "Big Mood", promoting his mixtape No Magic.

His fourth mixtape, Street Side Effects, was released on 13 November 2020. His mixtape collaboration with Headie One, Strength to Strength, was released on September 22, 2023, reaching number 4 on the UK Albums Chart and number one on the UK Hip-Hop and R&B Albums Chart.

== Early life ==
Devonte Kasi Martin Perkins was born on 21 October 1995, in the Lambeth area of South London.

== Career ==
=== 2017–2019: Career beginnings, The Last Whip, The Re-Up, and No Magic ===
K-Trap started rapping at a young age, yet he only began to start taking music seriously in 2015. Despite him just starting to take his career seriously, K-Trap was arrested and was in jail for two years before being found not guilty. He entered the music scene in 2017 after being released from prison and was known distinctively for his choice of wearing a balaclava to hide his identity. K-Trap independently released his debut mixtape, The Last Whip on June 25, 2017, featuring guest appearances from Blade Brown, Headie One, Potter Payper, alongside several other artists. The mixtape would go on to be labelled as a cult classic of his. K-Trap released his second mixtape, The Re-Up on July 12, 2018, through Just Jam Records and would include guest appearances from popular British artists such as Loski, D-Block Europe, Sharna Bass, and Yxng Bane. The mixtape marked K-Trap's first appearance on the UK Albums Chart, debuting at number 37.

In 2019, K-Trap signed his first record deal with Black Butter Records before the release of his debut single, "Big Mood" which peaked at number 66 on the UK Singles Chart. In the music video for the track, K-Trap revealed his face for the first time after removing his balaclava to promote his third full-length mixtape, No Magic. The mixtape would eventually be released on June 27, 2019, and would peak at number 33 on the UK Albums chart.

In a December 2020 interview with Notion, K-Trap would go in-depth into the reasons behind him revealing his face:

Me taking off the mask… there wasn’t too much thought into it. Obviously the reason why I wore the mask in the first place, the circumstances just weren’t valid anymore. I felt like, to get to that next level and the level I want to get to, it’s something that I needed to do. And I got to the stage where I actually wanted to show the real me. Like, as much as in this game we play, and in entertainment, there’s a lot of people that act a certain way or they behave a certain way, or they put out an image that might not be them. I feel like the mask deep down isn’t me, I wasn’t too much of a fan of it and I just felt like it was that time to level up.

=== 2020–2023: Mainstream breakout, The Last Whip II, and Strength to Strength ===
On October 26, 2020, K-trap shared the tracklist for his fourth mixtape, Street Side Effects. The mixtape was preceded by the single "New Opp Block" featuring British drill rapper, Abra Cadabra. The mixtape was released on November 13, 2020. It would make his second and final release under Black Butter Records.

K-Trap's breakthrough single, "Warm" was released on May 13, 2021. The track would eventually go viral on the video-sharing app TikTok for its catchy introduction. The track would later appear on K-Trap's fifth mixtape, Trapo released under his newly-founded independent record label, Thousand8. K-Trap received his first MOBO Award nomination for the Best Drill Act which he lost out to Central Cee.

On March 25, 2022, K-Trap and Blade Brown released the collaborative mixtape, Joints. On August 28, 2022, K-Trap released the single "Spoilt" alongside announcing the release of his sixth mixtape, the sequel to his debut, The Last Whip II. The mixtape was preceded by the singles "Busy", "Spoilt", and "Extra Sleeve" featuring Headie One, release just a day before the mixtape's official release on September 30, 2022.

Over a year after the release of the original, following an increase in popularity of "Warm" on social media, K-Trap recruited UK rap legend Skepta to appear on the remix of "Warm". K-Trap won his first MOBO Award for the Best Drill Act at the 2022 ceremony on November 30, 2022.

On September 22, 2023, K-Trap released his collaborative mixtape, Strength to Strength with fellow UK drill rapper, Headie One. The mixtape was preceded by three singles, "Catfish" and "Park Chinois". The mixtape was released on September 22, alongside the single "Triple Threat" with Clavish. The project proceeded to debut at number 4 on the UK Albums Chart.

K-Trap won his second consecutive MOBO Award for the Best Drill Act at the 2023 ceremony on February 7, 2024.

=== 2024–present:Smile? ===
On April 18, 2024, K-Trap announced the release of his debut studio album, Smile?. The album was preceded by five singles, "Heaven or Hell", "Old School Era", "Mobsters" with Blade Brown, "Victory Lap", and "Whistle".

== Artistry ==
=== Influences ===
Perkins has referred to his early influences stemming from R&B and that he often listens to slow jams, reggae, and soul music.

== Discography ==
=== Studio albums ===
List of studio albums, with selected details and peak chart positions
Title	Details	Peak chart positions	
Title	Details	UK	UK R&B
Smile?	Released: 31 May 2024; Label: Thousand8, EGA, UMG; Format: CD, Mini-LP, digital download, streaming	10	1
Trapo 2	Released: 21 August 2026; Label: Thousand8; Format: Digital download, streaming	86	1

=== Mixtapes ===
List of studio albums, with selected details and peak chart positions
Title	Details	Peak chart positions	
Title	Details	UK	UK R&B
The Last Whip	Released: 25 June 2017; Label: Self-released; Format: Digital download, streaming	—	8
The Re-Up	Released: 12 July 2018; Label: Just Jam; Format: Digital download, streaming	37	11
No Magic	Released: 27 June 2019; Label: Black Butter; Format: Digital download, streaming	33	19
Street Side Effects	Released: 13 November 2020; Label: Black Butter; Format: Digital download, streaming	26	1
Trapo	Released: 10 September 2021; Label: Thousand8; Format: Digital download, streaming	33	4
The Last Whip II	Released: 30 September 2022; Label: Thousand8; Format: Digital download, streaming	12	2
"—" denotes a recording that did not chart or was not released in that territory.

=== Collaborative mixtapes ===
List of collaborative mixtapes, with selected details and peak chart positions
Title	Details	Peak chart positions	
Title	Details	UK	UK R&B
Joints (with Blade Brown)	Released: 25 March 2022; Label: Thousand8, BxB Ent.; Formats: Digital download, streaming, CD	18	2
Strength to Strength (with Headie One)	Released: 22 September 2023; Label: Thousand8, One Records; Format: Digital download, streaming	4	1

=== Singles ===
==== As lead artist ====
List of singles, with year released, selected chart positions and certifications
Title	Year	Peak chart positions			Certifications	Album
Title	Year	UK	UK R&B/HH	IRE	Certifications	Album
"David Blaine"	2017	—	—	—		Non-album single
"Paper Plans"	2017	—	—	—		The Last Whip
"Behind Barz"	2017	—	—	—		Non-album single
"Wild Thoughts"	2017	—	—	—		Non-album single
"Watching"	2018	—	—	—		The Re-Up
"Anything Else"	2018	—	—	—		The Re-Up
"A to B"	2018	—	—	—		The Re-Up
"Back to Cali" (with Blade Brown)	2019	—	—	—		Non-album single
"Won't Stop"	2019	—	—	—		Non-album single
"Plaza Riddim" (with Tiggs Da Author)	2019	—	—	—		Morefire
"Mask Off"	2019	—	—	—		No Magic
"Big Mood"	2019	66	38	—		No Magic
"Mad About Bars" (with Mischief and Mixtape Madness)	2019	—	—	—		Non-album single
"Out The Mud"	2019	—	—	—		Non-album single
"Exit"	2019	—	—	—		Non-album single
"Paid the Cost"	2020	—	—	—		Non-album single
"Off White" (featuring Nafe Smallz)	2020	—	—	—		Non-album single
"Private Snap"	2020	—	—	—		Non-album single
"Shivers"	2020	—	—	—		Non-album single
"Whip That Work"	2020	—	—	—		Street Side Effects
"Daily Duppy"	2020	—	—	—		Non-album single
"New Opp Block" (with Abra Cadabra)	2020	—	—	—		Street Side Effects
"Warm" (solo or remix with Skepta)	2021	17	6	41	BPI: Platinum	Trapo
"Maths" (with DoRoad)	2021	—	—	—		Trapo
"Pick 'n' Mix"	2021	—	—	—		Trapo
"Different" (with Bis)	2021	—	—	—		Non-album single
"6 Figures" (with Blade Brown)	2022	—	—	—		Joints
"Daily Duppy (5 Million Subs Special)" (with Blade Brown and GRM Daily)	2022	—	—	—		Non-album single
"Busy"	2022	—	—	—		The Last Whip II
"Extra Sleeve" (featuring Headie One)	2022	71	29	—		The Last Whip II
"Mad About Bars" (with Kenny Allstar and Mixtape Madness)	2022	—	—	—		Non-album single
"Back 2 Back" (with Rimzee and Dirtbike LB)	2022	—	—	—		Cold Feet
"Predicate" (with Youngs Teflon and Tiny Boost)	2023	—	—	—		Purple Hearts
"Outings"	2023	—	—	—		Non-album single
"Catfish" (with Headie One and M1onTheBeat)	2023	—	—	—		Strength to Strength
"Park Chinois" (with Headie One)	2023	39	18	—		Strength to Strength
"Triple Threat" (with Headie One and Clavish)	2023	31	13	—		Strength to Strength
"Heaven or Hell"	2024	47	21	—		Smile?
"Old School Era"	2024	—	—	—		Smile?
"Mobsters" (with Blade Brown)	2024	—	—	—		Smile?
"Victory Lap"	2024	—	—	—		Smile?
"Whistle"	2024	—	—	—		Smile?
"—" denotes a recording that did not chart or was not released in that territory.

==== As featured artist ====
List of singles, with year released, selected chart positions and certifications
Title	Year	Peak chart positions		Certifications	Album
Title	Year	UK	UK R&B/HH	Certifications	Album
"Diamonds" (Yxng Bane featuring K-Trap)	2017	—	—		Non-album singles
"Airforce" (Remix) (DigDat featuring K-Trap and Krept & Konan)	2018	20	6	BPI: Gold	Non-album singles
"I Spy" (Krept & Konan featuring K-Trap and Headie One)	2019	18	11	BPI: Gold	Revenge Is Sweet
"Are You Mad" (Yxng Bane featuring K-Trap)	2020	66	—		Quarantime: The Lost Files
"Pull Up" (Ms Banks featuring K-Trap)	2021	—	—		Non-album single
"—" denotes a recording that did not chart or was not released in that territory.

=== Other charted and certified songs ===
List of songs, with year released, selected chart positions and certifications
Title	Year	Peak chart positions	Certifications	Album
Title	Year	UK	Certifications	Album
"Joints" (Blade Brown featuring K-Trap)	2019	70		Bags & Boxes 4
"Interlude"	2022	—	BPI: Silver	The Last Whip II

=== Guest appearances ===
List of non-single guest appearances, with year released, other artist(s) and album name shown
Title	Year	Other artist(s)	Album
"Operation Fortress"	2023	D-Block Europe	DBE World
"Bricks & Mortar" (OneFour featuring K-Trap)	2025	Look at Me Now	

== Awards and nominations ==
Year	Organization	Award	Work	Result	Reference
2021	MOBO Awards 2021	Best Drill Act	Himself	Nominated	
2022	MOBO Awards 2022	Best Drill Act	Himself	Won	
2023	MOBO Awards 2023	Best Drill Act	Himself	Won	
