= Pakistan (D-Block Europe song) =

Single by D-Block Europe and Clavish

from the album DBE World
- Released: 29 June 2023
- Length: 2:54
- Label: D-Block; EGA; UMG
- Songwriters: Adam Williams; Ricky Banton; Cian Wright; Obi Ebele; Uche Ebele
- Producer: Da Beatfreakz

D-Block Europe singles chronology
"Side Effects" (2023)	"Pakistan" (2023)	"Potential" (2023)

Clavish singles chronology
"100mph Freestyle x3" (2023)	"Pakistan" (2023)	"Click Of My Fingers" (2023)

Music video
- "Pakistan" on YouTube

"Pakistan" is a song by British hip-hop collective D-Block Europe featuring British rapper Clavish. It was released on 29 June 2023, as the second single from D-Block Europe's sixth mixtape DBE World. The song was produced by Da Beatfreakz.

== Background ==
The track was first teased by Young Adz through Instagram live in 2020 prior to the official release. The original song was solely Young Adz, however, the official release sees an addition of Dirtbike LB and Clavish.

== Critical reception ==
Critics noted that "Pakistan" has an "energetic and infectious beat" with a "catchy hook." It's also noted that Clavish's verse is "smoothly executed."

== Music video ==
The official music video was released alongside the audio. It was filmed in Stratford, East London in Westfield after Young Adz requested fans to come to the location. The video featured several Pakistan flags alongside Clavish in an abandoned area.

== Personnel ==
Credits and personnel adapted from Tidal.

Musicians

- Adam "Young Adz" Williams – lead artist, songwriter, composer
- Ricky "Dirtbike LB" Banton – lead artist, songwriter, composer
- Cian "Clavish" Wright – lead artist, songwriter, composer

Technical

- Prince Galalie – mastering engineer
- Prince Galalie – mixing engineer
- IBØ – mixing engineer

== Charts ==
Chart performance for "Pakistan"
Chart (2023)	Peak position
Ireland (IRMA)	34
UK Singles (Official Charts)	8
UK Hip Hop/R&B (Official Charts)	3

== Certifications ==
Certifications for "Pakistan"
Region	Certification	Certified units/sales
United Kingdom (BPI)	Gold	400,000^{‡}
^{‡} Sales+streaming figures based on certification alone.
