= Gangsteritus =

2021 single by Belters Only and Jazzy

Song by Potter Payper feat. Tiggs Da Author

from the album Thanks for Waiting
- Released: 2021
- Length: 3:43
- Label: 0207 Def Jam
- Songwriters: Ellis Cruickshank Taylor; Jamel Bousbaa
- Producer: Show N Prove

Potter Payper feat. Tiggs Da Author singles chronology
"Gangsteritus" (2021)	"Catch Up" (2021)

Music Video
- "Gangsteritus" on YouTube

Music Video
- "Gangsteritus (Director's Cut)" Video on Vimeo

"Gangsteritus" is a song by British rappers Potter Payper and Tiggs Da Author. In April 2022, it was used in the British television crime drama Top Boy and became his first song to reach the weekly Top 40 of the UK Singles Chart.

== Background ==
In an interview with Complex, Potter Payper called it the favourite song from his mixtape, Thanks for Waiting. He went on to say that while he did not like the song at first, after it he did the spoken word, the song "had a new depth and a new meaning".

Various publications and music commentators hailed it as a modern classic and one of the great British rap singles of its time.

The song was featured in the Netflix series Top Boy at the climax of the season closing out the finale episode.

A Part 2 of the track with a feature from Nines was later released.

== Music video ==
The music video was released in December 2021 with an alternate live audio version of the track. It features Potter in a glowing 1992 Volkswagen Golf MK1 flatbed truck ridden on a dark road. The video uses innovative UV drone light technology and it is directed by British filmmaker Shan Phearon.

A rare alternate Director's Cut version with extended UV performance sequences was unveiled in January 2022.

== Charts ==
Chart performance for "Gangsteritus"
Chart (2022)	Peak position
Ireland (IRMA)	30
UK Singles (OCC)	12
UK Hip Hop/R&B (OCC)	5

The song was the first top 15 hit single in the UK charts for both Potter Payper and for the Def Jam 0207 label.

== Certifications ==
Region	Certification	Certified units/sales
United Kingdom (BPI)	Gold	400,000^{‡}
^{‡} Sales+streaming figures based on certification alone.
