= Money Can't Buy Happiness =

Studio album by Fredo
- Released: 29 January 2021
- Length: 43:21
- Label: Since 93; RCA; Sony Music UK
- Producer: Dave (also exec.); Arkz Beats; Da Beatfreakz; Dukus; Eddie Serafica; G1; Kirk Beats; Kyle Evans; Mjproductions; Mojam; Rico Beats; RyLoui$; Yoz Beatz

Fredo chronology
Third Avenue (2019)	Money Can't Buy Happiness (2021)	Independence Day (2021)

Singles from Money Can't Buy Happiness
- 1. "What Can I Say" Released: October 29, 2020; 2. "Back to Basics" Released: January 21, 2021; 3. "Money Talks" Released: January 28, 2021

Money Can't Buy Happiness is the second studio album by British rapper Fredo, released on 29 January 2021 by Since 93, RCA, and Sony Music UK. The album succeeds the debut album Third Avenue, released in 2019, and includes guest appearances from Dave, Pop Smoke, Summer Walker & Young Adz. Money Can't Buy Happiness was executive produced by Dave, with additional production from Da Beatfreakz, Kyle Evans, and Rico Beats, alongside several other producers.

Money Can't Buy Happiness was supported by three singles: "What Can I Say", "Back to Basics", which reached number 20 on the UK Singles Chart, and "Money Talks" featuring Dave, which reached number 3 on the UK Singles Chart.

== Background ==
Fredo released the album's lead single, "What Can I Say", on 29 October 2020, following a six-month absence before returning to music. Following his six-month hiatus, on 20 January 2021, Fredo had officially taken to his Instagram to announce the album. The announcement was followed by Fredo's return to music with the album's second single, "Back to Basics" on 21 January 2021, which peaked at #20 on the UK Singles Chart. On 24 January 2021 Fredo had taken to his Instagram to post the album's official tracklist, teasing features from Dave, Pop Smoke, Summer Walker & Young Adz. Just a day before the release of the album, on 28 January 2021, Fredo released the third and final single from the album, "Money Talks" featuring Dave.

== Critical reception ==
Professional ratings
Review scores
Source	Rating
Clash	8/10
The Forty-Five	3/5 stars
The Observer	4/5 stars

Money Can't Buy Happiness received generally positive reviews from critics. Writing for Clash, Robin Murray wrote that "thematically, the album cuts close to the bone", before admitting that "it’s the sonic details that really allow Money Can’t Buy Happiness to reach that higher level". Murray wrote that "the sheer accuracy of the studio effects, the subtlety of the arrangements, all build to enhance Fredo’s bars, containing intricate messages of personal truth" and that "Fredo has never been so open, and this frankness is at first shocking". Concluding his review, he stated that the album "is our most vivid portrait yet of Fredo’s soul". The Forty-Five's Kate French-Morris stated that "to document street life without staying stuck in it, both in music and real life, is a tough gig that Fredo hasn’t wholly mastered, but his fixation on solid narration could be his ace card". Concluding her review, she wrote that "the select feature list and continued neat control suggest Fredo’s not just a good rapper but a good editor, whittling down songs until only the finest remain". Kate Hutchinson for The Observer wrote that on the album, "the mood is surprisingly melancholy, accented by Tupac-echoing piano, the beats punchy and unfussy, and Fredo’s lyrical flair shines through".

== Track listing ==
Money Can't Buy Happiness
No.	Title	Writer(s)	Producer(s)	Length
1.	"Biggest Mistake"	Marvin Bailey; Daniel Buse; David Omoregie	Arkz Beats	4:55
2.	"Back to Basics"	Bailey; Omoregie; Kyle Evans	Dave	3:17
3.	"Spaghetti"	Bailey; Omoregie; Evans; Rylouis Nicolas; Jeuan Tabarrejo	Dave; Kyle Evans; RyLoui; G1	3:32
4.	"Ready" (featuring Summer Walker)	Bailey; Summer Walker; Evans; Camille Purcell; Eithne Bhraonáin; Thom Bell; William S. Hart; James Murray; Farah Love; Mustafa Omer; Nicky Ryan; Roma Ryan	Mojam; Eddie Serafica	4:22
5.	"Money Talks" (featuring Dave)	Bailey; Omoregie; Evans; Ayo Oyerinde	Dave	4:34
6.	"Do You Right"	Bailey; Michael Jorbozeh	Mjproductions	3:45
7.	"Burner On Deck" (featuring Pop Smoke and Young Adz)	Bailey; Bashar Jackson; Adam Williams; Ricardo LaMarre; Yosief Tafari; Omoregie; Evans; Oyerinde	Rico Beats; Yoz Beatz	3:08
8.	"I Miss"	Bailey; George Kirkham	Kirk Beats	3:45
9.	"Blood in My Eyes"	Bailey; Omoregie; Oyerinde; Andrew Hozier-Byrne	Dave	4:09
10.	"Aunt's Place"	Bailey; Ludwig Alemeza	Dukus	4:16
11.	"What Can I Say"	Bailey; Jahmori Simmons; Uche Ebele; Obi Ebele	Da Beatfreakz	3:38
Total length:				43:21

== Charts ==
Weekly chart performance for Money Can't Buy Happiness
Chart (2021)	Peak position
Belgian Albums (Ultratop Flanders)	106
Dutch Albums (Album Top 100)	43
Irish Albums (OCC)	2
Scottish Albums (OCC)	38
UK Albums (OCC)	2
UK R&B Albums (OCC)	3

== Certifications ==
Certifications for Money Can't Buy Happiness
Region	Certification	Certified units/sales
United Kingdom (BPI)	Gold	100,000^{‡}
^{‡} Sales+streaming figures based on certification alone.

== See also ==
- List of 2021 albums (January–June)
