= Real Back in Style =

Studio album by Potter Payper
- Released: 12 May 2023
- Genre: British hip-hop
- Length: 50:50
- Label: 0207 Def Jam
- Producer: 169; Aaronorage; Harry Beech; Chucks; Emil; Kyle Evans; EY; Fumes Beats; Harry Fraud; GX; Jason Julian; Kieran Nash; R14; Quincy; Joe Stanley; Westy

Potter Payper chronology
Thanks for Waiting (2021)	Real Back in Style (2023)

Singles from Real Back in Style
- 1. "Blame Brexit" Released: 5 January 2023; 2. "Multifaceted" Released: 23 February 2023; 3. "Corner Boy" Released: 17 March 2023

Real Back in Style is the debut studio album by English rapper Potter Payper, released on 12 May 2023 by 0207 Def Jam. It follows Payper's 2021 mixtape, Thanks for Waiting, and his Training Day mixtape trilogy.

== Release and promotion ==
The album was announced on 21 April 2023 through Payper's social media. It was supported by three singles through the first quarter of 2023: "Blame Brexit", "Multifaceted" and "Corner Boy".

== Critical reception ==
Professional ratings
Aggregate scores
Source	Rating
Metacritic	84/100
Review scores
Source	Rating
Clash	8/10
Mic Cheque	8.5/10
Rolling Stone	4/5 stars
The Telegraph	4/5 stars
Whynow	5/5 stars

According to the review aggregator Metacritic, Real Back in Style received "universal acclaim" based on a weighted average score of 84 out of 100 from 4 critic scores. For The Telegraph, Will Pritchard praised the album's storytelling and realism, describing it as "disarmingly honest music that indicates a newly mature era for UK rap." In a five-star review, Fred Garratt-Stanley of Whynow commented "Real Back in Style presents Potter Payper’s trademark style of impassioned, fiery road rap storytelling in a tighter, more cohesive format than ever before. His narratives are cleverly woven, the instrumentals behind them powerful and expansive." For Rolling Stone, Joe Goggins described Real Back in Style as "an exercise in authenticity", while noting Payper's production nods to 90s hip-hop.

=== Year-end lists ===
Select year-end rankings of Real Back in Style
Publication	List	Rank	Ref.
Clash	Albums Of The Year 2023	56	
Complex UK	Complex UK's Best Albums of 2023	2	

== Track listing ==
All tracks are written by Jamel Bousbaa.

Real Back in Style track listing
No.	Title	Producer(s)	Length
1.	"Real Back in Style"	Jason Julian; Kyle Evans	3:46
2.	"Quite Befitting"	Emil; Kz^{[c]}	4:25
3.	"All My Life, If I Had..."	Quincy; Aaronorage^{[c]}; Kz^{[c]}	3:23
4.	"A Million £"	R14; Kz^{[a]}	3:24
5.	"Multifaceted"	GX	2:57
6.	"What They Ain't"	169	3:44
7.	"How Can I Explain?"	Quincy	3:56
8.	"Blame Brexit"	EY	3:09
9.	"Toy Story 2"	Aaronorage; Harry Beech; Kieran Nash; R14	3:16
10.	"Scenes"	GX; Joe Stanley^{[c]}; Zubnid^{[c]}; Kz^{[a]}	3:22
11.	"Corner Boy"	Chucks; Fumes Beats	2:59
12.	"Track Flocaine"	Harry Fraud	2:33
13.	"Money or Victims? (Kayla's Story)"	Chucks; Westy	3:20
14.	"Actuality"	EY; Kz^{[a]}	2:51
15.	"White Ash"	GX; Stanley	3:45
Total length:			50:50

== Personnel ==
- Potter Payper – vocals
- Lewi White – mixing, mastering
- Will Lite – mixing, mastering
- Calum Landau – engineering
- Aaronorage – engineering on "Multifaceted"
- Chucks – engineering on "Multifaceted"
- Joe Brice – engineering assistance on "Real Back in Style" and "Multifaceted"
- Baely – vocals on "Real Back in Style" and "White Ash"

== Charts ==
Chart performance for Real Back in Style
Chart (2023)	Peak position
Scottish Albums (OCC)	8
UK Albums (OCC)	2
UK R&B Albums (OCC)	1
