= Clavish =

British rapper (born 1998)

- Born: Cian Francis William Wright; 4 October 1998 (age 28); Stamford Hill, London, England
- Genres: British hip hop; trap; UK drill
- Occupations: Rapper; songwriter
- Years active: 2018-present
- Labels: EGA Distro (current); Polydor (former)
- Website: www.clavishofficial.com

Cian Francis William Wright (born 4 October 1998), known professionally as Clavish, is a British rapper from Stamford Hill, London. He is currently signed with EGA Distro, and is noted for his signature flow on trap and drill beats. In December 2022, Clavish earned his first UK Top 10 with the D-Block Europe-assisted "Rocket Science" which peaked at number 9 on the UK Singles Chart. His first mixtape Rap Game Awful released on 13 January 2023 and debuted at number 4 on the UK Albums Chart.

Clavish's second mixtape Chapter 16 (2024) performed moderately, reaching number 30 on the UK Albums Chart and number 3 on the UK R&B Albums Chart. He then released the EP To Be Continued... independently in 2025, and another EP Yesterday Was Once Tomorrow later that year under his new deal with EGA. In September 2026, Clavish was arrested for a May 2024 shooting that occurred in Stamford Hill, and was later charged with conspiracy to murder among other charges.

== Career ==
=== 2018–2021: Career beginnings and 2022 ===
Clavish began rapping in 2018 with the release of "All These Funds". Following a quiet 2019, Clavish broke through with his appearance on GRM Daily's "Daily Duppy" series with his own reaching over ten million views on YouTube. In 2021, Clavish released the singles "One of a Kind" in August and "Like This" in November, and followed up with his debut EP 2022 in December.

=== 2022–2025: Rap Game Awful and Chapter 16 ===
Clavish released the single "Sold Out Dates" in March which marked his first UK debut at number 93. This was later followed by the song "Greece" which peaked at number 70. Building on the momentum from the two previous singles, Clavish released "Public Figure" which peaked at number 66, marking his highest charting song at the time. The song also received a co-sign from Drake's OVO Sound Radio. This was later followed by the D-Block Europe-assisted "Rocket Science" in November which earned Clavish his first top-ten single, peaking at number 9 on the UK Singles Chart. The single was accompanied by the announcement of Clavish's debut mixtape, Rap Game Awful. The mixtape was supported by the singles "Traumatised" and "No Difference" and released on 13 January 2023, debuting at number 4 on the UK Albums Chart.

On 29 June 2023, Clavish appeared as a feature on D-Block Europe's highly anticipated "Pakistan", the second cut on their sixth commercial mixtape, DBE World. The track debuted at number 10 on the UK Official Charts marking his second appearance in the top ten following his previous D-Block Europe-assisted "Rocket Science".

While teasing his upcoming mixtape, Chapter 16 for months, on 7 September 2023, Clavish released the project's lead single, "Tip Toes" with Aitch. Clavish later appeared alongside K-Trap and Headie One for their top forty charting single, "Triple Threat" which appeared on the duo's mixtape, Strength to Strength. The mixtape's second single, "Top 2" was released on 19 October. This was followed by its third single, "IDK" on 15 February 2024, and the Fredo-accompanied "Uh Uh" on 7 March, alongside the mixtape's official announcement. The mixtape's fifth single, "10th Floor" with Potter Payper was released on 18 April. Just weeks later, the sixth single with D-Block Europe, "Most Definitely" was released on 9 May. A day prior to the mixtape's release, on 16 May, Clavish released the final two singles, "Last Night in Paris" and "Vartry Road".

In 2025, Clavish departed from Polydor Records with the release of his second extended play, To Be Continued....

=== 2025-present: Yesterday Was Once Tomorrow ===
On 8 April 2025, it was announced that Clavish entered a partnership with EGA Distro. Throughout the year, Clavish released multiple singles, including "Red Riding Hood", "Benz" with Mabel, "Figure 8's", "1942", and "Blow a Wish".

On 12 December 2025, Clavish released his third EP, Yesterday Was Once Tomorrow, which was supported by the lead single "CC Walk" with Chy Cartier.

On 29 January 2026, Clavish appeared on the song "Gang Gang" with Nafe Smallz. On 27 April he released the single "Greatest Rapper Alive". This was followed up in July with the single "Yep", then "Which One" with MoStack in August, and "NRF Freestyle 2" in September. He then featured on the track "Ye" with 163Margs, and "Get It How You Live" with Marnz Malone.

== Feuds ==
=== Fredo ===
Clavish entered a feud with former collaborator Fredo in 2024. The dispute began during the rollout of Clavish's 2024 single "Uh Uh", which was on Clavish's second mixtape Chapter 16. According to Fredo, he initially asked for a £50,000 cash fee in order to perform the verse and appear in the music video, but then told Clavish to ask Polydor Records for £70,000 so that Clavish could take £20,000 for himself. Fredo insisted the fee be in cash in order to not pay taxes, as he was currently living in Dubai. Instead, Fredo was given £70,000 in his bank account. When Clavish's management asked for his cut of the money, Fredo gave him £10,000 instead, insisting that taxes reduced the value of the payout, and that he technically only owed them around £8,000 anyway. Clavish's management responded saying "a deal is a deal", rising tensions.

On Clavish's October 2024 track "Backseat of the Rolls", he addressed rumors that he was "finessed" for money, and in his July 2025 "Went Legit" remix, he mentioned not "chippin' in for no spanner", or contributing any money in order to buy a gun, which was interpreted by Fredo as a diss about his legal case in London.

In August 2025, Clavish was in Melbourne, Australia for scheduled performances. After doing a promotion for a food truck-style ice cream shop at a car park, Clavish and his management were sitting in a sprinter van when they were ambushed by multiple Australian men who asked them for an apology to Fredo. Clavish and his team fled, with Clavish running into a nearby McDonald's. Clavish was approached by a masked individual with a gun inside of the McDonalds, with a photo surfacing of Clavish jumping over the counter towards the attacker. Local authorities were notified and the attacker fled. When the police arrived, Clavish was detained. He declined to make a statement to police, and no arrests were made. No injuries were reported.

== Legal issues ==
On 16 September 2026, Clavish was arrested for a shooting that occurred on the 18th May 2024 in his hometown of Stamford Hill, London, during which a 38-year old woman was shot in the leg. She was not believed to be the intended target. On 30 September, Clavish was charged with conspiracy to murder, grievous bodily harm, and possession of a firearm with intent to endanger life. On the 20th October 2026, a proposed trial date was announced for August 2027.

== Discography ==
=== Mixtapes ===
List of mixtapes, with selected chart positions, sales and certifications
Title	Details	Peak chart positions				Certifications
Title	Details	UK	UK R&B	UK DL	IRE	Certifications
Rap Game Awful	Released: 13 January 2023; Label: Polydor; Format: Cassette, CD, LP, streaming, digital download	4	1	12	31	BPI: Gold
Chapter 16	Released: 17 May 2024; Label: Polydor; Format: CD, streaming, digital download	30	3	69	—	
"—" denotes a recording that did not chart or was not released in that territory.

=== Extended plays ===
Title	Details
2022	Released: 10 December 2021; Label: Polydor; Formats: Digital download, streaming
To Be Continued...	Released: 17 January 2025; Label: Self-released; Formats: Digital download, streaming
Yesterday Was Once Tomorrow	Released: 12 December 2026; Label: EGA Distro; Formats: Digital download, streaming

=== Singles ===
==== As lead artist ====
List of singles as lead artist, with selected chart positions, showing year released and album name
Title	Year	Peak chart positions			Certifications	Album
Title	Year	UK	UK R&B	IRE	Certifications	Album
"All These Funds"	2018	—	—	—		Non-album singles
"Again"	2019	—	—	—		Non-album singles
"100mph Freestyle"	2019	—	—	—		Non-album singles
"Mad About Bars" (with Mixtape Madness)	2019	—	—	—		Non-album singles
"Ketchup & Salad Cream"	2019	—	—	—		Non-album singles
"Welcome to the Trenches (Pop Smoke Remix)"	2019	—	—	—		Non-album singles
"Could've"	2020	—	—	—		Non-album singles
"100mph Freestyle X2"	2020	—	—	—		Non-album singles
"No Cap"	2020	—	—	—		Non-album singles
"Amiri Balmain"	2020	—	—	—		Non-album singles
"Money Makers" (with Kirky)	2020	—	—	—		Non-album singles
"Daily Duppy" (featuring GRM Daily)	2020	—	—	—		Non-album singles
"How It Goes"	2021	—	—	—		Non-album singles
"The Generals Corner" (with Kenny Allstar)	2021	—	—	—		Non-album singles
"One Of A Kind"	2021	—	—	—		Non-album singles
"Fashion Week Freestyle"	2021	—	—	—		Non-album singles
"Like This"	2021	—	—	—		Non-album singles
"Plugged In" (with Fumez the Engineer)	2021	—	—	—		Non-album singles
"Sold Out Dates"	2022	93	—	—		Non-album singles
"Greece"	2022	70	—	—	BPI: Silver	Rap Game Awful
"Public Figure"	2022	66	32	—		Rap Game Awful
"NRF Freestyle"	2022	—	—	—		Rap Game Awful
"Rocket Science" (featuring D-Block Europe)	2022	9	3	40	BPI: Gold	Rap Game Awful
"Traumatised"	2023	63	37	—		Rap Game Awful
"No Difference"	2023	57	32	—		Rap Game Awful
"100mph Freestyle x3"	2023	—	—	—		Non-album singles
"Click Of My Fingers"	2023	—	—	—		Non-album singles
"Day Date"	2023	73	—	—		Non-album singles
"Tip Toes" (with Aitch)	2023	52	24	—		Chapter 16
"Triple Threat (with Headie One and K-Trap)	2023	31	13	—		Strength to Strength
"Top 2"	2023	—	—	—		Chapter 16
"IDK"	2024	—	—	—		Chapter 16
"Uh Uh" (with Fredo)	2024	70	—	—		Chapter 16
"10th Floor" (with Potter Payper)	2024	—	—	—		Chapter 16
"Most Definitely" (with D-Block Europe)	2024	88	—	—		Chapter 16
"Last Night in Paris"	2024	—	—	—		Chapter 16
"Vartry Road"	2024	—	—	—		Chapter 16
"Benz" (with Mabel)	2025	—	—	—		Mabel
"—" denotes a recording that did not chart or was not released in that territory.

==== As a featured artist ====
List of singles as featured artist, with selected chart positions, showing year released and album name
Title	Year	Peak chart positions			Certifications	Album
Title	Year	UK	UK R&B	IRE	Certifications	Album
"Let It Rip (Remix)" (KAWALi featuring Clavish & wewantwraiths)	2022	—	—	—		Non-album singles
"Pakistan" (D-Block Europe featuring Clavish)	2023	8	3	34	BPI: Gold	DBE World
"—" denotes a recording that did not chart or was not released in that territory.

=== Other charted songs ===
List of other charted songs, with selected chart positions, showing year released and album name
Title	Year	Peak chart positions		Certifications	Album
Title	Year	UK	UK R&B	Certifications	Album
"4 of Us" (featuring Rimzee, Tiny Boost and Youngs Teflon)	2023	89	—	BPI: Silver	Rap Game Awful
"Different League" (Nines featuring Clavish and Nafe Smallz)	2023	93	35		Crop Circle 2
"—" denotes a recording that did not chart or was not released in that territory.

=== Guest appearances ===
List of non-single guest appearances, showing year released, other artist(s), and album name
Title	Year	Other artist(s)	Album
"All Stars 2"	2020	Nines, Frosty, Q2T, Chappo CSB	Crabs in a Bucket
"Shopping Uptown"	2021	Dezzie	Uno Uno
"Mind"	2021	Fredo	Independence Day
"Different League"	2023	Nines, Nafe Smallz	Crop Circle 2
"Head Knees & Shoulders"	2024	Potter Payper	Thanks for Hating
