= Third Avenue (album) =

Studio album by Fredo
- Released: February 1, 2019
- Label: RCA; Since '93; Sony Music UK

Fredo chronology
Tables Turn (2018)	Third Avenue (2019)	Money Can't Buy Happiness (2021)

Singles from Third Avenue
- 1. "BMT" Released: November 8, 2018; 2. "Survival of the Fittest" Released: January 14, 2019; 3. "All I Ever Wanted" Released: January 30, 2019

Professional ratings
Aggregate scores
Source	Rating
Metacritic	68/100
Review scores
Source	Rating
Clash	6/10
The Guardian	4/5 stars

Third Avenue is the debut studio album by British rapper Fredo. It was released on 1 February 2019 through RCA Records.

== Track listing ==
No.	Title	Length
1.	"Survival of the Fittest"	2:15
2.	"Morning"	2:52
3.	"Mmhm"	4:00
4.	"Money Maker"	2:56
5.	"Pray for You"	2:23
6.	"BMT"	2:51
7.	"Property Picking"	3:13
8.	"All I Ever Wanted" (featuring Dave)	4:28
9.	"It's Like"	2:47
10.	"Doing the Most" (featuring Lil Dotz)	3:04
11.	"They Don't"	2:58
12.	"Love You for That"	3:30
13.	"Third Avenue"	3:24

== Charts ==
Chart	Peak position
Dutch Albums (Album Top 100)	59
Irish Albums (OCC)	28
Scottish Albums (OCC)	68
UK Albums (OCC)	5
UK R&B Albums (OCC)	1

== Certifications ==
Region	Certification	Certified units/sales
United Kingdom (BPI)	Silver	60,000^{‡}
^{‡} Sales+streaming figures based on certification alone.
