= Blade Brown =

British rapper

- Born: Jonathan James Wrate; 12 February 1985 (age 41); Streatham, London, England
- Origin: Battersea, London, England
- Genres: British hip hop; road rap
- Occupations: Rapper; songwriter
- Years active: 2003–present
- Website: bxbldn.com

Jonathan James Wrate (born 12 February 1985), known professionally as Blade Brown is a British rapper and songwriter from Battersea, London. He released the mixtape series Bags and Boxes, and the Financial Times mixtapes. XXL has compared his style to that of early Young Jeezy and Gucci Mane.

== Biography ==
=== Early life and career beginnings (1985–2006) ===
Wrate was born on 12 February 1985 in Streatham, later moving to Battersea. He is a supporter of Manchester United F.C. He was first exposed to hip hop through his father, who would listen to 80s and 90s hip hop as well as reggae at home, all of which influenced Wrate to take an interest in music and start rapping more seriously around the age of 17. He released his debut mixtape entitled Nothing Long Volume 1 under Defenders Entertainment in 2004, but he took a break from music following a spell of both underground and commercial success through the mixtape which was played on mainstream radio stations such as Choice FM, BBC Radio 1Xtra and Kiss FM, as well as street DVDs in circulation at the time such as Streetz Incarcerated, Streetz Is Raw and Welcome to the city. Between 2005 and 2006, he recorded material for a second mixtape, which was initially entitled Nothing Long Volume 2, but it was never released due to the legal troubles Wrate was experiencing at the time, as well as a change in his own preferences as he has stated that he did not want to release many of the songs he had recorded.

== Business Ventures ==
BXB Cannabis Club

Blade Brown owns his own Cannabis Clubs called BXB Barcelona.

BXB Clothing

Blade Brown is the owner of the clothing label BXB LDN. BXB LDN have done a few fashion collaboration seasons with the worldwide fashion brand founded from West London called "Trapstar".

Don Londrès Alcohol

Blade Brown and Dre London are co-owners of the Don Londrès. Don Londrès is a premium, additive-free tequila crafted in Jalisco, Mexico. Known for its ultra-smooth finish and minimalist frosted bottles, Don Londrès is available in Blanco and Reposado expressions. Don Londrés is the first Alcohol Brand to launch in Selfridges and sell out same day.

Mamedica Medical Cannabis

Blade Brown exclusively revealed to Complex UK that he has joined Mamedica as an investor and partner, backing the UK medical cannabis company as it continues to grow its presence in the country’s regulated medical cannabis market. Blade Brown made a statement on the business investment:

“My investment in Mamedica marks an important step in my career as I look to expand beyond music and into new industries,” Blade tells Complex UK. “I’ve been following the UK medical cannabis sector since it became legal in 2018, and over the past three to four years, I’ve been looking for the right opportunity to get involved. Mamedica stood out to me because of what they were doing and the vision they had for the industry, which aligned with what I wanted to be part of.

“I believe there’s still a significant lack of awareness around the legal medical cannabis sector in the UK, and it’s important that more people understand the treatment options available to those who need them. I see this as an industry that is still in its early stages, with huge potential for growth, and I’m proud to be taking a position in a sector that I believe will continue to develop and make a real difference to people’s lives.”

== Discography ==
=== Collaborative mixtapes ===
Title	Released	Details	Peak chart positions	
Title	Released	Details	UK	UK R&B
Hollowman meets Blade (with Giggs (rapper))	Released: 2007	Label: SN1 Records, Formats: CD, Digital Download	—	—
Joints (with K-Trap)	Released: 25 March 2022	Label: BXB Ent Ltd., Thousand8 Records Formats: CD, Digital Download	18	2

=== Mixtapes ===
Title	Released	Details	Peak chart positions
Title	Released	Details	UK
Nothing Long Volume 1	2004	Label: Defenders Entertainment; Formats: CD	—
Best of Blade	2009	Label: Ruthless Records; Formats: CD, digital download	—
Bags and Boxes	Released: 31 March 2010	Host: Mykal Million; Formats: CD, digital download	—
Financial Times	Released: 31 March 2011	Label: Hill Productions; Formats: CD, digital download	—
Best of Blade 2	Released: 9 February 2012	Host: Charlie Sloth; Formats: CD, digital download	—
Bags and Boxes 2	Released: 30 November 2012	Formats: CD, digital download	—
Best of Blade 3	Released: 14 October 2014	Host: Big Bad Blue; Formats: CD, digital download	—
Bags and Boxes 3	Released: 31 November 2014	Label: Self-released; Formats: CD, digital download	42
Bags and Boxes 4	Released: 16 August 2019	Label: Catalyst Records; Formats: Digital download, streaming	12
"—" denotes an album that did not chart or was not released in that territory.

=== Other charted songs ===
Title	Year	Peak chart positions	Album
Title	Year	UK	Album
"Joints" (featuring K-Trap)	2019	70	Bags and Boxes 4

== Awards and nominations ==
Year	Event	Prize	Nominated work	Result	Ref
2010	Official Mixtape Awards	Best Hip Hop Mixtape	Bags and Boxes	Nominated	
2012	Official Mixtape Awards	Mixtape of the Year	Financial Times	Won	
2012	Official Mixtape Awards	Best Hip Hop Mixtape	Financial Times	Won	
2012	Official Mixtape Awards	Best Male Artist		Nominated	
2013	Official Mixtape Awards	Best Overall Mixtape	Bags and Boxes 2	Nominated	
2015	Rated Awards	Best Video	Drug Dealer (featuring Tiggs Da Author)	Nominated	
