= Rimzee =

British rapper (born 1991)

- Rimzee in 2026

Background information
- Born: Ricardo Miles; Upper Clapton, London, England
- Genre: British hip hop
- Occupations: Rapper; songwriter; record producer
- Years active: 2010–present
- Website: https://www.rimzee.com/

Ricardo Miles (born 9 September 1991), known professionally as Rimzee, is a British rapper and songwriter. He is from Clapton, East London. Rimzee gained popularity in 2011 and released his debut mixtape The Upper Clapton Dream in 2012.

In 2022, Rimzee most recently released his acclaimed third mixtape, Cold Feet which peaked at number 11 on the UK Albums Chart.

== Music career ==
In 2010, Rimzee released his first video "2010 Freestyle / New York Minute Remix". He later released The Upper Clapton Dream with singles such as "Here I Am", "I'm On", "Keep Stackin'", "Everyday" and his cover of Adele's "Hometown" in 2012.

In July 2013, Rimzee was officially sentenced to 13 years in jail for shooting at an unmarked police car - curtailing his burgeoning music career. He was released on licence after serving six-and-a-half years.

Following Rimzee's return home from jail, in 2019, he released his second mixtape, Upper Clapton Dream 2 on 27 November 2020. The charting mixtape included features from Potter Payper, M24, Snap Capone and Haile (from WSTRN); with "Xabsi", "Lifestyle Cold", "Jada & Styles" and "Anything" being some of the standout tracks.

Rimzee's Upper Clapton Dream mixtape series name was inspired by Black the Ripper's mixtape, The Edmonton Dream.

In 2021, Rimzee released singles "PTSD", "Split Decisions" and "Expensive Pain" featuring Born Trappy, leading BBC Radio 1Xtra to announce Rimzee as one of their Hot for 2022 artists on 14 December.

Rimzee released his third official mixtape, entitled Cold Feet on October 14, 2022; featuring the likes of Giggs, Young Adz, Emeli Sandé and more. In the project's first week of release, it charted independently at number 11 - just shy of top 10 in the UK's Official Album Charts, while being number 1 in the Official Hip Hop and R&B Album Charts In November 2023, Rimzee released the single "The Game", featuring British rapper ArrDee.

In February 2024, Rimzee released his fourth mixtape, Feed the Streets, featuring Bobby Shmurda, Youngs Teflon and Potter Payper, among others. It peaked at number 45 on the UK Albums Chart. In December 2024 he released The Archives, a four-track EP. In August 2026, Rimzee released Free at Last, a five-track EP whose title refers to the end of his licence after six and a half years. In November 2026, he released the "Hometown Freestyle".

== Business career ==
In 2021, Rimzee announced the opening of his fast food establishment, Burgers & Bagels, located in Fulham, South West London.

== Discography ==
=== Mixtapes ===
List of mixtapes, with selected details
Title	Details	Peak chart positions
Title	Details	UK
The Upper Clapton Dream	Released: 2012; Label: Self-released; Format: Digital download, streaming	—
Upper Clapton Dream 2	Released: 27 November 2020; Label: Self-released; Format: Digital download, streaming	96
Cold Feet	Released: 14 October 2022; Label: Self-released; Format: CD, Digital download, streaming	11
Feed the Streets	Released: 16 February 2024; Label: Self-released; Format: CD, CT, Digital download, streaming	45

=== Extended plays ===
List of extended plays, with selected details
Title	Details	Peak chart positions
Title	Details	UK
The Archives	Released: 27 December 2024; Label: Self-released; Format: Digital download, streaming	—
The Archives Deluxe	Released: 7 August 2025; Label: Self-released; Format: Digital download, streaming	—
Free at Last	Released: 28 August 2026; Label: Self-released; Format: Digital download, streaming	—
