= Money Talks (Fredo song) =

2021 single by Fredo featuring Dave

Single by Fredo featuring Dave

from the album Money Can’t Buy Happiness
- Released: January 28, 2021
- Length: 4:34
- Label: Neighbourhood Recordings; Since '93
- Songwriters: Marvin Bailey; David Omoregie; Ayo Oyerinde; Kyle Evans
- Producer: Dave

Fredo singles chronology
"Back to Basic" (2021)	"Money Talks" (2021)	"Independence Day Freestyle" (2021)

Dave singles chronology
"Rule of Two" (2020)	"Money Talks" (2021)	"Little Bo Peep" (2021)

Music video
- "Money Talks" on YouTube

"Money Talks" is a song written and performed by British rappers Fredo featuring Dave, released on January 28, 2021, by Neighbourhood Recordings and Since '93. It was solely produced by Dave and co-written by Ayo Oyerinde and Kyle Evans. It served as the third and final single to Fredo's sophomore full-length studio album, Money Can't Buy Happiness (2021). The song peaked at number 3 on the UK Singles Chart, making it Fredo's second top-ten UK single and Dave's third.

== Composition ==
Robin Murray for Clash wrote that the track "subverts those rolling trap snares, its dub-like effects and low-end saturation conjuring feels of absence and melancholy". Jon Powell for Revolt TV wrote that the track "helps to show the listeners how far these talents exist above the opposition".

== Music video ==
The Edem Wornoo-directed music video has several references to films: the burning money in the video refers to The Dark Knight in which The Joker is seen burning money, as the whole video is shot in reverse, it plays homage to TENET, and the gambling and prostitution scenes relate to Casino.

== Personnel ==
Credits and personnel adapted from Tidal.

Musicians

- Marvin Bailey – lead artist, vocals, songwriter, composer
- David Omoregie – production, executive producer, vocals, songwriter, composer
- Kyle Evans – additional production, composer, songwriter
- Ayo Oyerinde – piano, composer, songwriter

Technical

- Dave Turner – mastering
- Manon Grandjean – mixing
- Ileki J. Scarlett – recording
- Liam Hebb – assistant engineer

== Charts ==
Weekly chart performance for "Money Talks"
Chart (2021)	Peak position
Ireland (IRMA)	8
UK Singles (OCC)	3
UK Hip Hop/R&B (OCC)	1

== Certifications ==
Region	Certification	Certified units/sales
United Kingdom (BPI)	Gold	400,000^{‡}
^{‡} Sales+streaming figures based on certification alone.
