= Fredo (rapper) =

British rapper (born 1994)

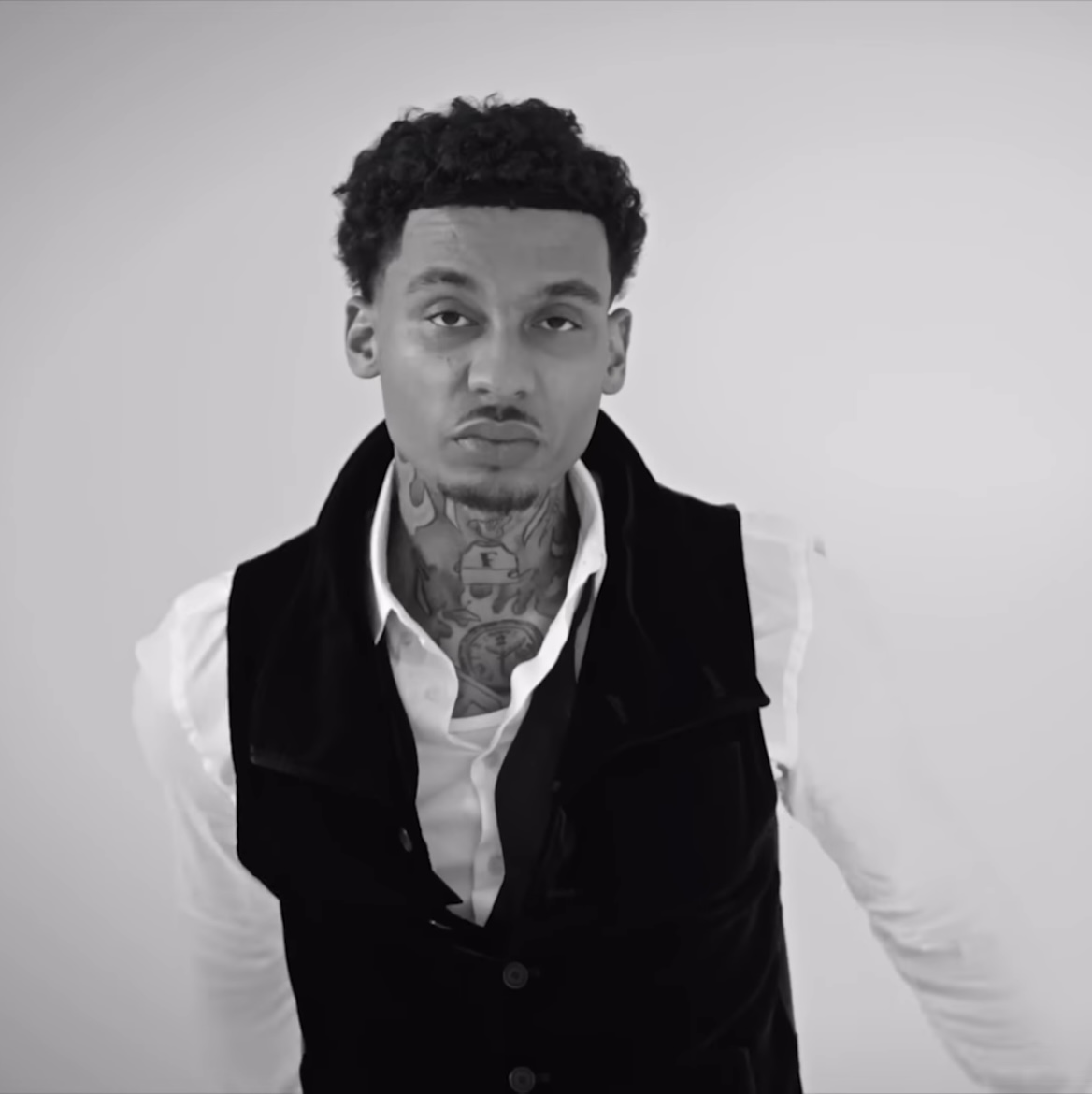
- Fredo in 2022

Background information
- Born: Marvin William Bailey; 6 March 1994 (age 32)
- Origin: Mozart Estate, Queen's Park, London, England
- Genre: British hip-hop
- Occupations: Rapper; singer; songwriter
- Years active: 2016–present
- Labels: Biordi (current); PG Records; Since '93; RCA (former)

Marvin William Bailey (born 6 March 1994), known professionally as Fredo, is a British rapper and singer from Mozart Estate, Queen's Park, London. He rose to fame in 2016 from his track "They Ain't 100". Two years later he achieved his first UK number one single with fellow rapper Dave titled "Funky Friday".

Fredo's first album Third Avenue (2019) was released through RCA Records, and peaked at number 5 on the UK Albums Chart, later becoming certified Silver In 2021. Fredo's second album Money Can't Buy Happiness (2021) peaked at number two on the UK Albums Chart and was supported by the single "Money Talks" with Dave, which reached number three on the UK Singles Chart. The album later became certified Gold in 2025. Fredo followed up with his third album Independence Day (2021) which peaked at number nine on the UK Albums Chart. He later released the album Unfinished Business (2023) which also peaked at number nine on the UK Albums Chart, becoming his fourth top-ten album.

== Early life ==
Marvin Bailey grew up in Queen's Park, London to a Bajan father and Moroccan mother from Letchworth Garden City (Hertfordshire), and lived on Queen's Park's Mozart Estate where he was surrounded by gang violence and crime. During Bailey's youth, he listened to Giggs and 50 Cent, stating "I remember I used to bang Get Rich or Die Tryin' every day".

== Music career ==
=== 2016–2018: Initial success, Get Rich or Get Recalled and Tables Turn ===
Bailey released his first track "They Ain't 100" in March 2016. Three weeks later he went to prison, on a knife crime charge which was later dropped. Whilst he was in prison, the track gained popularity, with radio play and millions of views. Inspired by its success, and despite a second stint in prison, he persisted in his newfound rapping and recording career, releasing two mixtapes, Get Rich or Get Recalled in 2017, and Tables Turn in 2018, the latter of which reached number five on the UK Albums Chart. He also appeared as a featured artist on tracks by Kojo Funds and Young T & Bugsey, as well as on Dave's 2018 hit single "Funky Friday".

=== 2019–2021: Third Avenue and Money Can't Buy Happiness ===
Fredo's first full-length album, Third Avenue, was released on 1 February 2019. Produced mostly by JB, it marked Bailey's debut on RCA's Since '93 imprint. It included "Love You for That", a track dedicated to his mother and apologising for not being the perfect son. The album takes its title from the West London housing estate he grew up on. In January 2021, Bailey released his second album, Money Can't Buy Happiness, which contained features from Pop Smoke, Dave, Summer Walker and Young Adz. It peaked at number two on the UK Albums Chart.

=== 2021–2023: Independence Day and Unfinished Business ===
On 24 June 2021, Fredo announced his third album, Independence Day, which was released on 5 August 2021 and peaked at number nine on the UK Albums Chart. The album announced that his future music would be released independently. On 11 August 2023, Bailey released his fourth album, Unfinished Business, which again peaked at number nine on the UK Albums Chart.

=== 2024–present: Motion Sickness ===
In March 2024, Fredo appeared on Clavish's track "Uh Uh". Two months later, following his release from a Dubai prison, he released his first solo track in over a year, the single "Top G", which is a reference to controversial internet personality Andrew Tate. Following another year-long hiatus, Fredo released the track "No Comment" on 21 August 2025, which served as a response to recent Internet rumors, including claims that he was on the run from British authorities. The track peaked at number 41 on the UK Single Chart. The single also marked his first release under Australian record label Biordi Music. He then released the track "Runnin" on 19 January 2026, which peaked at number 52 on the singles chart and included references to rapper Clavish. This was shortly followed up with "Birthday" with Burna Boy and Steel Banglez on 30 January which peaked at number 79 on the singles chart. On 19 June 2026, Fredo released his fifth studio album, Motion Sickness. It peaked at number 81 on the UK Albums Chart.

== Business career ==
It was reported on 26 April 2021 on Kick Game's website, a retailer of footwear, that Bailey invested millions of pounds to become a shareholder of the Kick Game company. In 2021, Kick Game’s revenue over the last 12 months had grown from £2 million to £15 million. Kick Game has a YouTube channel with over 1,000,000 subscribers, which features celebrities purchasing footwear from Kick Game and discussing their preferred styles.

On 9 August 2022, Bailey founded the international clothing brand Parental Guidance.

== Legal issues ==
=== 2016–2017: Stabbing charges ===
Bailey spent time in prison on remand in 2016 and 2017, both times for stabbing-related charges that were dropped before reaching court. He has also been the victim of a stabbing attack, having been stabbed four times on one occasion on his local high street.

=== 2021–2023: Banned temporarily from Mozart Estate ===
In July 2021, the Westminster housing ASB team gained two direct injunctions with power of arrest granted against Bailey and fellow rapper Jayvon Tison, also known as Lil Dotz. They were both banned from entering or attempting to enter or remain on the Mozart Estate and the Lydford Estate. Bailey was arrested in July 2023, and the Westminster housing ASB team were successful in enforcing the breach of his injunction. Bailey was ordered to pay a fine of £5k plus court costs. The order was then extended in July 2023 until July 2025.

=== 2024: Dubai arrest ===
It was heavily rumoured on the internet via many Media Outlets that on 29 January 2024, that Bailey was sentenced to five years in prison in Dubai for cannabis possession after being arrested in late 2023. However, Bailey was released from the Dubai prison after three months and made a video clarifying about his time in prison.

== Discography ==
Studio albums

- Third Avenue (2019)
- Money Can't Buy Happiness (2021)
- Independence Day (2021)
- Unfinished Business (2023)
- Motion Sickness (2026)

Mixtapes

- Get Rich or Get Recalled (2017)
- Tables Turn (2018)
