= Potter Payper =

British rapper

- Also known as: Potter
- Born: Jamel Bousbaa; 15 November 1991 (age 34)
- Origin: Barking, London, England
- Genres: British hip hop; road rap
- Occupations: Rapper; songwriter
- Years active: 2010–present
- Labels: 36 The Label; EGA Distro (current); 0207 Def Jam; Faceless Sounds; MOD Entertainment (former)
- Website: https://potterpayper.com/

Jamel Bousbaa (born 15 November 1991), known professionally as Potter Payper, is a British rapper and songwriter from Barking, London, he started rapping early and gained attention through black box freestyles and grime blogs with friend and fellow rapper KB. In 2021, he signed to the UK division of Def Jam Recordings. In 2022, his song "Gangsteritus" featuring Tiggs Da Author became his first UK top 40 single. after its use in Top Boy.

== Early life ==
Jamel Bousbaa was born on 15 November 1991 in the Barking area of East London to an Irish mother and an Algerian father. He grew up on the Gascoigne Estate in Barking, being raised by his grandmother, Nanny Lucy. He has one younger sibling who is 16 years younger than him. Bousbaa's father wasn't around much in his youth, and he'd face racism and nationalism due to his Islamic last name.

Bousbaa began writing lyrics at the age of 10 years old before rapping to his friends at school. After being expelled from school in year 7, Bousbaa started recording music at the local Baseline Youth Club.

== Personal life ==
On 13 August 2015, Bousbaa was arrested during the execution of a warrant at an address in Clacton, Essex, following an investigation into the "Frankie" county drug line, which resulted in charges of one count of possession with intent to supply a class A drug and one count of conspiring to supply a class A drug. He was jailed for five years and four months. He was released in June 2020.

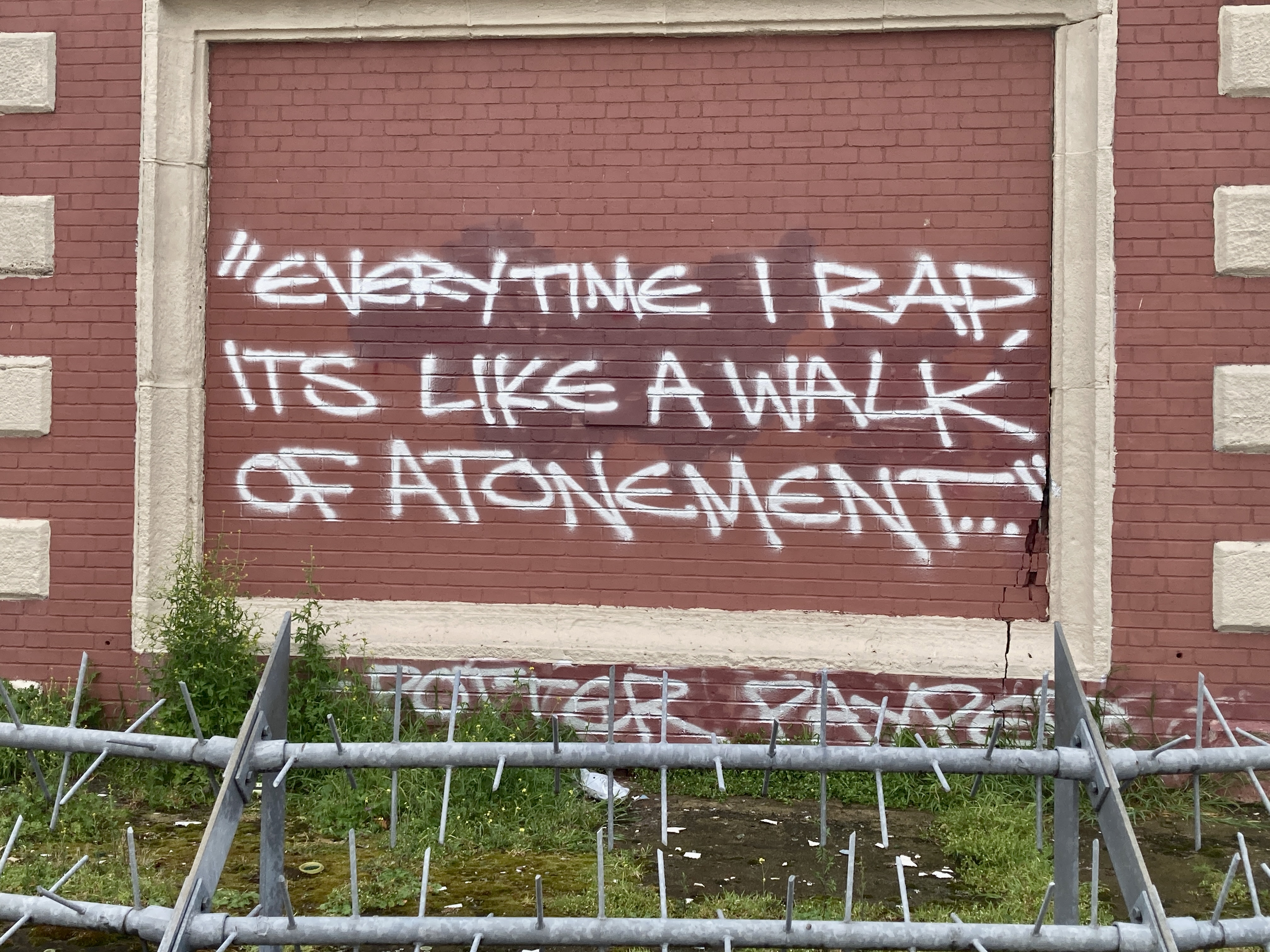
Graffiti quoting Bousbaa on Hungerford Bridge, London.

== Discography ==
=== Studio albums ===
List of studio albums, with selected details and peak chart positions
Title	Details	Peak chart positions		
Title	Details	UK	UK R&B	SCO
Real Back in Style	Released: 12 May 2023; Label: 0207 Def Jam; Format: CD, digital download, streaming	2	1	8

=== Mixtapes ===
List of mixtapes, with selected details and peak chart positions
Title	Details	Peak chart positions		Certifications
Title	Details	UK	UK R&B	Certifications
The Philosopher's Chrome	Released: 2010; Label: Self-released; Format: Digital download, streaming	—	—	
Training Day	Released: 9 July 2013; Label: Self-released; Format: Digital download, streaming	—	—	
24	Released: 15 January 2015; Label: MOD Entertainment; Format: Digital download, streaming	—	19	
Training Day 2	Released: 13 September 2016; Label: Self-released; Format: Digital download, streaming	—	—	
Training Day 3	Released: 18 September 2020; Label: Faceless Sounds; Format: Digital download, streaming	3	2	BPI: Gold
Thanks for Waiting	Released: 1 October 2021; Label: 0207 Def Jam; Format: Digital download, streaming	8	1	
Thanks for Hating	Released: 23 February 2024; Label: 36 The Label, EGA; Format: Digital download, streaming	5	1	
36 Hours (with M Huncho)	Released: 10 May 2024; Label: 36 The Label, EGA; Format: Digital download, streaming	28	3	
Nightmare Before Christmas	Released: 29 November 2024; Label: 36 The Label, EGA; Format: Digital download, streaming	30	3	
"—" denotes a recording that did not chart or was not released in that territory.

=== Extended plays ===
List of extended plays, with selected details
Title	Details
One Time	Released: 25 March 2016; Label: Grimey Limey; Format: Digital download, streaming
Pay Per View (with Big Watch)	Released: 30 September 2017; Label: Self-released; Format: Digital download, streaming
Regina vs. Jamel Bousbaa	Released: 20 July 2018; Label: Self-released; Format: Digital download, streaming
2020 Vision	Released: 19 June 2020; Label: Self-released; Format: Digital download, streaming

=== Singles ===
List of singles, with selected chart positions and certifications
Title	Year	Peak chart positions			Certifications	Album
Title	Year	UK	UK R&B	IRE	Certifications	Album
"2020 Vision Freestyle"	2020	41	28	—		Non-album single
"Purpose"	2020	64	—	—	BPI: Silver	Training Day 3
"Science"	2020	79	—	—		Training Day 3
"Slumdog Millionaire"	2020	100	—	—		Training Day 3
"Topshottas Freestyle"	2021	60	—	—		Non-album single
"Catch Up" (featuring M Huncho)	2021	70	33	—		Thanks for Waiting
"Gangsteritus" (featuring Tiggs Da Author)	2022	12	5	30	BPI: Gold	Thanks for Waiting
"Blame Brexit"	2023	75	—	—		Real Back in Style
"Multifaceted"	2023	—	—	—		Real Back in Style
"Corner Boy"	2023	—	—	—		Real Back in Style
"Facade" (with Digga D)	2023	55	25	—		Back to Square One
"Trench P (London City)"	2024	—	—	—		Thanks for Hating
"Sinaloa Cartel"	2024	—	—	—		Thanks for Hating
"Love Me How"	2024	—	—	—		Thanks for Hating
"Midas Touch"	2024	—	—	—		Thanks for Hating
"Regina" (with Jimmy)	2024	—	—	—		Where Should I Start?
"Kop that Shit" (Remix) (with Aystar and Skrapz)	2024	—	—	—		Non-album single
"Rap Game"	2024	—	—	—		Non-album single
"You Don't Know Me"	2024	—	—	—		Nightmare Before Christmas
"Fire In The Booth, Pt. 2" (with Charlie Sloth)	2024	—	—	—		Non-album single
"A Long Time" (with Millyz)	2025	—	—	—		Blood In The Water 2
"—" denotes a recording that did not chart or was not released in that territory.

=== Other charted songs ===
List of other charted songs, with selected chart positions
Title	Year	Peak chart positions	Album
Title	Year	UK	Album
"Real Back in Style"	2023	72	Real Back in Style
"White Ash"	2023	77	Real Back in Style
