= Dave discography =

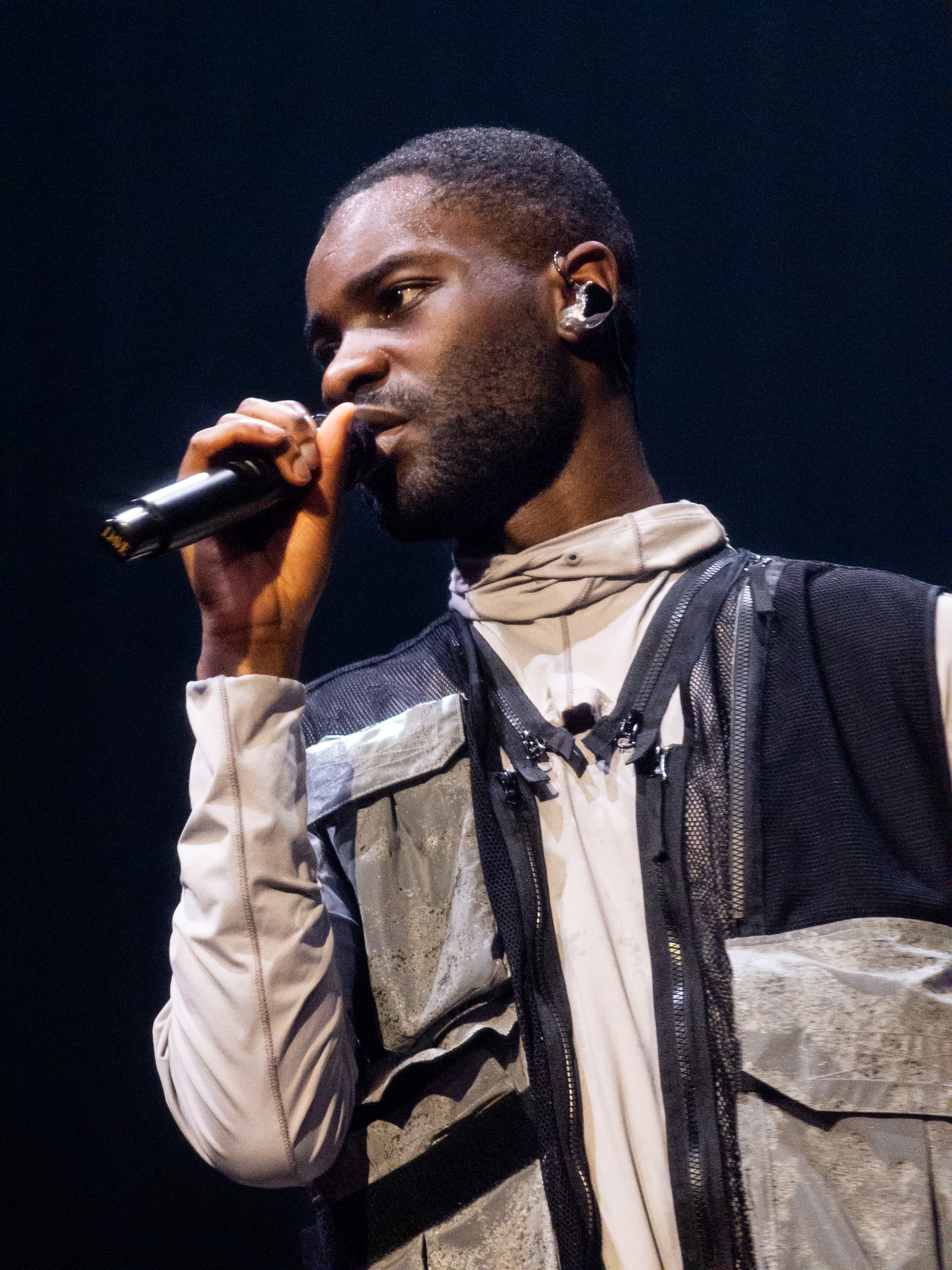
- Dave performing in 2026
- Studio albums: 3
- EPs: 3
- Singles: 28

The discography of British rapper Dave consists of three studio albums, three extended plays, 28 singles and ten singles as a featured artist.

== Studio albums ==
List of studio albums, with selected chart positions, sales figures, and certifications
Title	Album details	Peak chart positions										Sales (Note: Pure sales and not equivalent units (streaming and song downloads))	Certifications
Title	Album details	UK	AUS	CAN	DEN	FRA	IRE	NLD	NZ	SWI	US Heat.	Sales	Certifications
Psychodrama	Released: 8 March 2019; Label: Neighbourhood; Format: CD, LP, streaming, digital download	1	—	—	31	—	6	26	—	—	—	UK: 585,664	BPI: 2× Platinum; MC: Gold; IFPI DEN: Platinum; GLF: Gold; RMNZ: Gold
We're All Alone in This Together	Released: 23 July 2021; Label: Neighbourhood; Format: CD, LP, cassette, streaming, digital download	1	5	18	6	151	1	6	8	18	10	UK: 488,788	BPI: Platinum; IFPI DEN: Platinum; RMNZ: Gold
The Boy Who Played the Harp	Released: 24 October 2025; Label: Neighbourhood; Format: CD, LP, cassette, streaming, digital download	1	7	19	2	86	1	2	10	5	*	UK: 73,779	BPI: Gold; IFPI DEN: Gold; RMNZ: Gold
"—" denotes a recording that did not chart or was not released in that territory. "*" denotes a chart did not exist at that time.

== Extended plays ==
List of extended plays, with selected chart positions
Title	Album details	Peak chart positions									Certifications
Title	Album details	UK	UK R&B	UK Ind.	UK DL	AT	CAN	DEN	SWI	US Heat.	Certifications
Six Paths	Released: 30 September 2016; Label: Self-released; Format: Streaming, digital download	76	7	20	21	—	—	—	—	—	BPI: Silver
Game Over	Released: 3 November 2017; Label: Self-released; Format: Streaming, digital download	13	2	1	3	—	—	—	—	—	BPI: Gold
Split Decision (with Central Cee)	Released: 5 June 2023; Label: Neighborhood, Live Yours; Format: Streaming, digital download	—	—	—	—	56	13	24	18	6	
"—" denotes a recording that did not chart or was not released in that territory.

== Singles ==
=== As lead artist ===
List of singles as a lead artist, with selected chart positions and certifications, year released, and album name
Title	Year	Peak chart positions										Certifications	Album
Title	Year	UK	AUS	CAN	DEN	FRA	IRE	NLD	NZ	US	WW	Certifications	Album
"JKYL+HYD"	2016	—	—	—	—	—	—	—	—	—	—		Non-album singles
"Thiago Silva" (with AJ Tracey)	2016	36	—	—	—	—	38	—	—	—	—	BPI: 2× Platinum; IFPI DEN: Platinum; RMNZ: Platinum	Non-album singles
"Picture Me"	2016	—	—	—	—	—	—	—	—	—	—		Six Paths
"Wanna Know"	2016	51	—	—	—	—	—	—	—	—	—	BPI: Platinum	Non-album singles
"Samantha" (with J Hus)	2017	63	—	—	—	—	—	—	—	—	—	BPI: 2× Platinum	Non-album singles
"Revenge"	2017	—	—	—	—	—	—	—	—	—	—		Non-album singles
"100M's"	2017	—	—	—	—	—	—	—	—	—	—	BPI: Silver	Non-album singles
"Tequila"	2017	86	—	—	—	—	—	—	—	—	—	BPI: Silver	Non-album singles
"Question Time"	2017	—	—	—	—	—	—	—	—	—	—		Game Over
"No Words" (featuring MoStack)	2017	17	—	—	—	—	—	—	—	—	—	BPI: 2× Platinum	Game Over
"Hangman"	2018	30	—	—	—	—	80	—	—	—	—	BPI: Gold	Non-album singles
"Funky Friday" (featuring Fredo)	2018	1	—	—	—	—	21	—	—	—	—	BPI: 3× Platinum; MC: Gold; RMNZ: Gold	Non-album singles
"Black"	2019	40	—	—	—	—	81	—	—	—	—	BPI: Gold	Psychodrama
"Streatham"	2019	9	—	—	—	—	21	—	—	—	—	BPI: Platinum; RMNZ: Gold	Psychodrama
"Location" (featuring Burna Boy)	2019	6	—	—	—	—	20	—	—	—	—	BPI: 5× Platinum; MC: Platinum; IFPI DEN: Platinum; IFPI SWI: 2× Platinum; NVPI: Platinum; RIAA: Gold; RMNZ: 3× Platinum; SNEP: Platinum	Psychodrama
"Disaster" (featuring J Hus)	2019	8	—	—	—	—	23	—	—	—	—	BPI: Platinum	Psychodrama
"Paper Cuts"	2019	15	—	—	—	—	35	—	—	—	—	BPI: Silver	Non-album singles
"Titanium"	2021	9	—	—	—	—	12	—	—	—	—	BPI: Platinum; RMNZ: Gold	Non-album singles
"Mercury" (featuring Kamal.)	2021	33	—	—	—	—	—	—	—	—	—		Non-album singles
"Clash" (featuring Stormzy)	2021	2	29	—	—	—	8	87	—	—	106	BPI: 2× Platinum; ARIA: Platinum; IFPI DEN: Gold; IFPI SWI: Gold; MC: Platinum; RMNZ: Platinum	We're All Alone in This Together
"Verdansk"	2021	4	—	—	—	—	9	—	—	—	—	BPI: Gold; IFPI DEN: Gold; RMNZ: Gold	We're All Alone in This Together
"Starlight"	2022	1	8	57	7	—	1	26	6	—	58	BPI: 2× Platinum; ARIA: Platinum; MC: Platinum; IFPI DEN: Gold; IFPI SWI: Gold; NVPI: Platinum; RMNZ: 2× Platinum; SNEP: Gold	Non-album singles
"My 24th Birthday"	2022	48	—	—	—	—	45	—	—	—	—		Non-album singles
"Sprinter" (with Central Cee)	2023	1	1	5	2	28	1	3	1	— (Note: "Sprinter" did not enter the Billboard Hot 100, but peaked at number 2 on the Bubbling Under Hot 100 chart.)	9	BPI: 3× Platinum; ARIA: 3× Platinum; MC: 4× Platinum; IFPI DEN: Platinum; NVPI: Platinum; RIAA: Platinum; RMNZ: 4× Platinum; SNEP: Platinum	Split Decision
"Meridian" (with Tiakola)	2023	41	—	—	—	1	62	—	— (Note: "Meridian" did not enter the NZ Top 40 Singles Chart, but peaked at number 23 on the NZ Hot Singles Chart.)	—	—	SNEP: Diamond	Non-album singles
"Special" (with Tiakola)	2023	—	—	—	—	8	—	—	—	—	—	SNEP: Gold	Non-album singles
"Stop Giving Me Advice" (with Lyrical Lemonade and Jack Harlow)	2023	29	—	—	—	—	33	— (Note: "Stop Giving Me Advice" did not enter the Dutch Single Top 100, but peaked at number seven on the Single Tip chart.)	— (Note: "Stop Giving Me Advice" did not enter the NZ Top 40 Singles Chart, but peaked at number seven on the NZ Hot Singles Chart.)	—	—		All Is Yellow
"Raindance" (featuring Tems)	2025	1	8	25	5	22	6	5	5	42	12	BPI: 2× Platinum; ARIA: Platinum; IFPI DEN: Platinum; MC: Platinum; NVPI: Platinum; RMNZ: 2× Platinum; SNEP: Platinum	The Boy Who Played the Harp
"—" denotes a recording that did not chart or was not released in that territory.

=== As featured artist ===
List of singles as a featured artist, with selected chart positions, year released, and album name
Title	Year	Peak chart positions					Certifications	Album
Title	Year	UK	UK R&B	FRA	IRE	WW	Certifications	Album
"U Can Stand Up" (Avelino featuring Dave)	2018	—	—	—	—	—		No Bullshit
"Got You" (169 featuring Dave)	2018	—	—	—	—	—		Seasons
"18Hunna" (Headie One featuring Dave)	2019	6	3	—	75	—	BPI: Gold	Music x Road
"All I Ever Wanted" (Fredo featuring Dave)	2019	15	6	—	74	—		Third Avenue
"Playing for Keeps" (D-Block Europe featuring Dave)	2019	21	12	—	—	—	BPI: Silver	PTSD
"Cassius Clay" (Avelino featuring Dave)	2019	—	—	—	—	—		Non-album single
"Money Talks" (Fredo featuring Dave)	2021	3	1	—	8	—	BPI: Gold	Money Can't Buy Happiness
"Propeller" (Jae5 featuring Dave and Bnxn)	2022	38	14	—	—	—	BPI: Silver	Non-album single
"Intoxycated" (Oxlade featuring Dave)	2023	49	28	—	—	—		Oxlade from Africa
"Cheat on Me" (Burna Boy featuring Dave)	2023	19	8	109	42	194	BPI: Silver	I Told Them...
"—" denotes a recording that did not chart or was not released in that territory.

== Promotional singles ==
=== As featured artist ===
List of promotional singles as featured artist, with selected chart positions, year released, and album name
Title	Year	Peak chart positions		Album
Title	Year	UK	NZ Hot	Album
"Doesn't Just Happen" (James Blake featuring Dave)	2026	66	9	Trying Times

== Other charted and certified songs ==
List of other songs as a lead artist, with selected chart positions, year released, and album name
Title	Year	Peak chart positions									Certifications	Album
Title	Year	UK	UK R&B	AUS	CAN	IRE	NLD	NZ Hot	SWE	WW	Certifications	Album
"Peligro" (Giggs featuring Dave)	2017	53	20	—	—	—	—	—	—	—	BPI: Gold	Wamp 2 Dem
"Game Over"	2017	—	27	—	—	—	—	—	—	—		Game Over
"Attitude"	2017	—	31	—	—	—	—	—	—	—		Game Over
"Calling Me Out"	2017	—	30	—	—	—	—	—	—	—		Game Over
"How I Met My Ex"	2017	32	13	—	—	—	—	—	—	—	BPI: Silver	Game Over
"My 19th Birthday"	2017	55	25	—	—	—	—	—	—	—	BPI: Silver	Game Over
"Venting" (Nines featuring Dave)	2018	—	—	—	—	—	—	—	—	—	BPI: Silver	Crop Circle
"Psycho"	2019	— (Note: "Psycho" did not enter the UK Singles Chart, as chart rules only allow three songs per artist to chart within the top 100 at a time, but peaked at number 24 on the UK Streaming Chart.)	33	—	—	—	—	—	—	—	BPI: Gold	Psychodrama
"Screwface Capital"	2019	70	27	—	—	44	—	—	—	—	BPI: Platinum; MC: Platinum; RMNZ: Platinum	Psychodrama
"Environment"	2019	— (Note: "Environment" did not enter the UK Singles Chart, as chart rules only allow three songs per artist to chart within the top 100 at a time, but peaked at number 54 on the UK Streaming Chart.)	—	—	—	—	—	—	—	—	BPI: Silver	Psychodrama
"Lesley" (featuring Ruelle)	2019	— (Note: "Lesley" did not enter the UK Singles Chart, as chart rules only allow three songs per artist to chart within the top 100 at a time, but peaked at number 24 on the UK Streaming Chart.)	—	—	—	—	—	—	—	—	BPI: Silver	Psychodrama
"Voices"	2019	— (Note: "Voices" did not enter the UK Singles Chart, as chart rules only allow three songs per artist to chart within the top 100 at a time, but peaked at number 62 on the UK Streaming Chart.)	—	—	—	—	—	—	—	—	BPI: Silver	Psychodrama
"Purple Heart"	2019	— (Note: "Purple Heart" did not enter the UK Singles Chart, as chart rules only allow three songs per artist to chart within the top 100 at a time, but peaked at number 61 on the UK Streaming Chart.)	—	—	—	—	—	—	—	—	BPI: Silver	Psychodrama
"Stinking Rich" (MoStack and J Hus featuring Dave)	2019	19	9	—	—	74	—	—	—	—		Stacko
"Nothing on You" (Ed Sheeran featuring Paulo Londra and Dave)	2019	— (Note: "Nothing on You" did not enter the UK Singles Chart, as chart rules only allow three songs per artist to chart within the top 100 at a time, but peaked at number 24 on the UK Streaming Chart.)	35	65	—	—	—	—	—	—	BPI: Silver; CAPIF: Platinum; MC: Gold	No.6 Collaborations Project
"Professor X"	2019	12	16	—	—	26	—	—	—	—	BPI: 2× Platinum; RMNZ: Gold	Top Boy
"God's Eye"	2019	90	—	—	—	—	—	—	—	—		Top Boy
"Straight Murder" (with Giggs)	2020	35	14	—	—	—	—	—	—	—	BPI: Silver	Now or Never
"We're All Alone"	2021	— (Note: "We're All Alone" did not enter the UK Singles Chart, as chart rules only allow three songs per artist to chart within the top 100 at a time, but peaked at number 18 on the UK Streaming Chart.)	6	—	—	—	—	16	—	—	BPI: Silver	We're All Alone in This Together
"In the Fire" (featuring Fredo, Meekz, Ghetts and Giggs)	2021	6	3	—	—	13	—	14	—	—	BPI: Gold	We're All Alone in This Together
"System" (featuring Wizkid)	2021	— (Note: "System" did not enter the UK Singles Chart, as chart rules only allow three songs per artist to chart within the top 100 at a time, but peaked at number 16 on the UK Streaming Chart.)	4	—	—	—	—	—	—	—	BPI: Gold	We're All Alone in This Together
"Twenty to One"	2021	— (Note: "Twenty to One" did not enter the UK Singles Chart, as chart rules only allow three songs per artist to chart within the top 100 at a time, but peaked at number 23 on the UK Streaming Chart.)	9	—	—	—	—	—	—	—	BPI: Silver	We're All Alone in This Together
"Lazarus" (featuring BOJ)	2021	— (Note: "Lazarus" did not enter the UK Singles Chart, as chart rules only allow three songs per artist to chart within the top 100 at a time, but peaked at number 24 on the UK Streaming Chart.)	8	—	—	—	—	—	—	—	BPI: Silver	We're All Alone in This Together
"Law of Attraction" (featuring Snoh Aalegra)	2021	— (Note: "Law of Attraction" did not enter the UK Singles Chart, as chart rules only allow three songs per artist to chart within the top 100 at a time, but peaked at number 30 on the UK Streaming Chart.)	11	—	—	—	—	—	—	—	BPI: Gold; RMNZ: Gold	We're All Alone in This Together
"Both Sides of a Smile" (featuring James Blake)	2021	— (Note: "Both Sides of a Smile" did not enter the UK Singles Chart, as chart rules only allow three songs per artist to chart within the top 100 at a time, but peaked at number 14 on the UK Streaming Chart.)	14	—	—	—	—	—	—	—	BPI: Silver	We're All Alone in This Together
"Survivor's Guilt"	2021	— (Note: "Survivor's Guilt" did not enter the UK Singles Chart, as chart rules only allow three songs per artist to chart within the top 100 at a time, but peaked at number 40 on the UK Streaming Chart.)	16	—	—	—	—	—	—	—	BPI: Silver	We're All Alone in This Together
"Fresh Out the Bank" (with Meekz)	2022	35	15	—	—	58	—	—	—	—		Respect the Come Up
"Trojan Horse" (with Central Cee)	2023	12	4	58	68	16	87	9	—	—	BPI: Gold; RMNZ: Gold	Split Decision
"Our 25th Birthday" (with Central Cee)	2023	— (Note: "Our 25th Birthday" did not enter the UK Singles Chart, as chart rules only allow three songs per artist to chart within the top 100 at a time, but peaked at number 46 on the UK Streaming Chart.)	—	—	—	—	—	12	—	—		Split Decision
"UK Rap" (with Central Cee)	2023	13	5	63	81	14	92	10	—	—	BPI: Gold; RMNZ: Gold	Split Decision
"Incredible Sauce" (Giggs featuring Dave)	2023	65	37	—	—	69	—	—	—	—	BPI: Silver	Zero Tolerance
"CRG" (Central Cee featuring Dave)	2025	6	1	—	—	17	70	4	—	141	BPI: Silver	Can't Rush Greatness
"3x" (with Jim Legxacy)	2025	72	21	—	—	—	—	—	—	—		Black British Music (2025)
"History" (featuring James Blake)	2025	9	2	—	—	16	82	9	— (Note: "History" did not enter the Swedish Singellista Chart, but peaked at number 2 on the Swedish Heatseeker Chart.)	—		The Boy Who Played the Harp
"175 Months"	2025	— (Note: "175 Months" did not enter the UK Singles Chart, as chart rules only allow three songs per artist to chart within the top 100 at a time, but peaked at number 29 on the UK Streaming Chart.)	—	—	—	—	—	18	—	—		The Boy Who Played the Harp
"No Weapons" (featuring Jim Legxacy)	2025	72	34	—	—	—	—	14	—	—		The Boy Who Played the Harp
"Chapter 16" (featuring Kano)	2025	11	3	—	—	—	—	—	—	—		The Boy Who Played the Harp
"Selfish" (featuring James Blake)	2025	— (Note: "Selfish" did not enter the UK Singles Chart, as chart rules only allow three songs per artist to chart within the top 100 at a time, but peaked at number 32 on the UK Streaming Chart.)	—	—	—	—	—	—	—	—		The Boy Who Played the Harp
"My 27th Birthday"	2025	— (Note: "My 27th Birthday" did not enter the UK Singles Chart, as chart rules only allow three songs per artist to chart within the top 100 at a time, but peaked at number 34 on the UK Streaming Chart.)	—	—	—	—	—	—	—	—		The Boy Who Played the Harp
"Marvellous"	2025	— (Note: "Marvellous" did not enter the UK Singles Chart, as chart rules only allow three songs per artist to chart within the top 100 at a time, but peaked at number 38 on the UK Streaming Chart.)	—	—	—	—	—	—	—	—		The Boy Who Played the Harp
"Fairchild" (with Nicole Blakk)	2025	— (Note: "Fairchild" did not enter the UK Singles Chart, as chart rules only allow three songs per artist to chart within the top 100 at a time, but peaked at number 48 on the UK Streaming Chart.)	—	—	—	—	—	—	—	—		The Boy Who Played the Harp
"The Boy Who Played the Harp"	2025	— (Note: "The Boy Who Played the Harp" did not enter the UK Singles Chart, as chart rules only allow three songs per artist to chart within the top 100 at a time, but peaked at number 23 on the UK Streaming Chart.)	—	—	—	25	78	—	— (Note: "The Boy Who Played the Harp" did not enter the Swedish Singellista Chart, but peaked at number 5 on the Swedish Heatseeker Chart.)	—		The Boy Who Played the Harp
"—" denotes a recording that did not chart or was not released in that territory.

== Guest appearances ==
List of non-single guest appearances, showing year released, other artist(s), and album name
Title	Year	Other artist(s)	Album
"Spirit Bomb" (Remix)	2016	AJ Tracey, Drifter, Cadell, Skits, Capo Lee, Merky Ace, PK, Trims, Central Cee	Non-album remix
"Peligro"	2017	Giggs	Wamp 2 Dem
"U Can Stand Up / Royal"	2017	Avelino	No Bullshit
"Venting"	2018	Nines	Crop Circle
"Stinking Rich"	2019	MoStack, J Hus	Stacko
"Nothing on You"	2019	Ed Sheeran, Paulo Londra	No.6 Collaborations Project
"Professor X"	2019	None	Top Boy – A Selection of Music; Inspired by the Series
"God's Eye"	2019	None	Top Boy – A Selection of Music; Inspired by the Series
"Children of the Internet"	2020	Future Utopia, Es Devlin	12 Questions
"Straight Murder"	2020	Giggs	Now or Never
"Fresh Out the Bank"	2022	Meekz	Respect The Come Up
"Incredible Sauce"	2023	Giggs	Zero Tolerance
"CRG"	2025	Central Cee	Can't Rush Greatness
"3x"	2025	Jim Legxacy	Black British Music (2025)

== Music videos ==
List of music videos, showing year released and directors
Title	Year	Director
As lead artist
"Thiago Silva" (with AJ Tracey)	2016	Dir.Lx
"Picture Me"	2016	Dir.Lx
"Wanna Know"	2016	Dir.Lx
"Six Paths"	2016	Dir.Lx
"71"	2016	Dir.Lx
"Two Birds No Stones"	2016	Dir.Lx
"Samantha" (with J Hus)	2017	Dir.Lx
"Revenge"	2017	Dir.Lx
"100M's"	2017	Dir.Lx
"Tequilla"	2017	Dir.Lx
"Question Time"	2017	Nathan James Tettey
"No Words" (featuring Mo Stack)	2017	Nathan James Tettey
"Hangman"	2017	Dir.Lx & Jeaniq
"Funky Friday" (featuring Fredo)	2018	Nathan James Tettey & Dave
"Black"	2018	Nathan James Tettey, Edem Wornoo & Dave
"Streatham"	2018	Nathan James Tettey & Dave
"Location" (featuring Burna Boy)	2018	Kaylum Dennis & Dave
"Proffesor X"	2019	Nathan James Tettey
"Clash" (featuring Stormzy)	2021	Edem Wornoo
"Verdansk"	2021	Nathan James Tettey & Dave
"Starlight"	2022	Nathan James Tettey & Dave
"Sprinter" (with Central Cee)	2023	Nathan James Tettey & Dave
"Meridian" (with Tiakola)	2023	Nathan James Tettey
"Stop Giving Me Advice" (with Jack Harlow)	2023	Cole Bennett
"Chapter 16" (featuring Kano)	2025	Harrison Adair
"Raindance" (featuring Tems)	2025	Nathan James Tettey
"The Boy Who Played the Harp"	2026	Edem Wornoo
As featured artist
"U Can Stand Up" (Avelino featuring Dave)	2018	Kaylum Dennis
"18Hunna" (Headie One featuring Dave)	2019	Nathan James Tettey
"All I Ever Wanted" (Fredo featuring Dave)	2019	KLVDR
"Nothing On You" (Ed Sheeran featuring Dave & Paulo Londra)	2019	Cxrter Saint & Kamcordings
"Playing for Keeps" (D-Block Europe featuring Dave)	2019	Rapman
"Cassius Clay" (Avelino featuring Dave)	2019	Charlie Sarsfield
"Money Talks" (Fredo featuring Dave)	2021	Edem Wornoo
"Propeller" (Jae5 featuring Dave & Bnxn)	2022	Edem Wornoo
"Cheat on Me" (Burna Boy featuring Dave)	2023	—N/a
"3x" (Jim Legxcy featuring Dave)	2025	Rohan.dil

== Production discography ==
List of production and songwriting credits (excluding guest appearances, interpolations, and samples)
Track(s)	Year	Credit	Artist(s)	Album
1. "Six Paths"	2016	Songwriter, co-producer (with Tyrell 169 & Fraser T. Smith)	Dave	Six Paths
2. "Picture Me"	2016	Songwriter, co-producer (with Fraser T. Smith)	Dave	Six Paths
4. "Breathe"	2016	Songwriter, co-producer (with Fraser T. Smith)	Dave	Six Paths
6. "71 / End Credits"	2016	Songwriter, co-producer (with Tyrell 169 & Fraser T. Smith)	Dave	Six Paths
3. "Teenage Fever"	2017	Additional vocals	Drake	More Life
3. "Attitude"	2017	Songwriter, co-producer (with Kyle Evans)	Dave	Game Over
5. "How I Met My Ex"	2017	Songwriter, producer	Dave	Game Over
6. "No Words"; (featuring MoStack)	2017	Songwriter, co-producer (with Steel Banglez)	Dave	Game Over
"Funky Friday" (with Fredo)	2018	Songwriter, co-producer (with Tyrell 169)	Dave	Non-album single
2. "Streatham"	2019	Songwriter, co-producer (with Nana Rogues)	Dave	Psychodrama
5. "Location"; (featuring Burna Boy)	2019	Songwriter, co-producer (with Jae5)	Dave	Psychodrama
7. "Screwface Capital"	2019	Songwriter, co-producer (with Tyrell 169 & Fraser T. Smith)	Dave	Psychodrama
9. "Lesley"; (featuring Ruelle)	2019	Songwriter, co-producer (with Fraser T. Smith)	Dave	Psychodrama
7. "Professor X"	2019	Songwriter, co-producer (with Kyle Evans)	Dave	Top Boy (A Selection of Music Inspired by the Series)
16. "God’s Eye"	2019	Songwriter, producer	Dave	Top Boy (A Selection of Music Inspired by the Series)
1. "Biggest Mistake"	2021	Songwriter, executive producer	Fredo	Money Can’t Buy Happiness
2. "Back to Basics"	2021	Songwriter, executive producer, producer	Fredo	Money Can’t Buy Happiness
3. "Spaghetti"	2021	Songwriter, executive producer, co-producer (with Kyle Evans, G1 & RyLoui$)	Fredo	Money Can’t Buy Happiness
4. "Ready"; (featuring Summer Walker)	2021	Executive producer	Fredo	Money Can’t Buy Happiness
5. "Money Talks"; (featuring Dave)	2021	Songwriter, executive producer, producer	Fredo	Money Can’t Buy Happiness
6. "Do You Right"	2021	Executive producer	Fredo	Money Can’t Buy Happiness
7. "Burner On Deck"; (featuring Pop Smoke & Young Adz)	2021	Songwriter, executive producer	Fredo	Money Can’t Buy Happiness
8. "I Miss"	2021	Executive producer	Fredo	Money Can’t Buy Happiness
9. "Blood in My Eyes"	2021	Songwriter, executive producer, producer	Fredo	Money Can’t Buy Happiness
10. "Aunt's Place"	2021	Executive producer	Fredo	Money Can’t Buy Happiness
11. "What Can I Say"	2021	Executive producer	Fredo	Money Can’t Buy Happiness
1. "We're All Alone"	2021	Songwriter, co-producer (with Kyle Evans & Nana Rouges)	Dave	We're All Alone in This Together
4. "In the Fire"	2021	Songwriter, co-producer (with Kyle Evans, James Blake & Dom Maker)	Dave	We're All Alone in This Together
5. "Three Rivers"	2021	Songwriter, co-producer (with Kyle Evans & James Blake)	Dave	We're All Alone in This Together
10. "Twenty To One"	2021	Songwriter, co-producer (with Kyle Evans, Joe Reeves & P2J)	Dave	We're All Alone in This Together
11. "Heart Attack"	2021	Songwriter, co-producer (with Joe Reeves & James Blake)	Dave	We're All Alone in This Together
12. "Survivors Guilt"	2021	Songwriter, producer	Dave	We're All Alone in This Together
15. "End of the Beginning"	2022	Songwriter, co-producer (with Young Chencs & Chris Rich)	Central Cee	23
"Starlight"	2022	Songwriter, producer	Dave	Non-album single
"My 24th Birthday"	2022	Songwriter, producer	Dave	Non-album single
"F64"	2023	Songwriter	Ed Sheeran	Non-album single
1. "Trojan Horse"	2023	Songwriter, producer	Dave & Central Cee	Split Decision
2. "Sprinter"	2023	Songwriter, co-producer (with Jo Caleb, Jonny Leslie, Jim Legxacy, Kyle Evans & TR The Producer)	Dave & Central Cee	Split Decision
3. "Our 25th Birthday"	2023	Songwriter, co-producer (with Kamal.)	Dave & Central Cee	Split Decision
"Toxic Trait" (featuring Fredo)	2023	Songwriter, producer	Stormzy	Non-album single
"Special"	2023	Songwriter, co-producer (with Jo Caleb & Nyadjiko)	Dave & Tiakola	Non-album single
"Walk in Wardrobe"	2025	Songwriter, co-producer (with Harley Arsenault, Arthur Bean, Synthetic & Aunix)	Central Cee	Can't Rush Greatness
1. "Opening"	2025	Songwriter	Ed Sheeran	Play
8. "A Little More"	2025	Songwriter, additional vocals	Ed Sheeran	Play
2. "175 Months"	2025	Songwriter, producer	Dave	The Boy Who Played the Harp
3. "No Weapons"	2025	Songwriter, co-producer (with Jim Legxacy, Jo Caleb, Jonny Leslie, Kyle Evans & .nathan)	Dave	The Boy Who Played the Harp
4. "Chapter 16"	2025	Songwriter, co-producer (with James Blake)	Dave	The Boy Who Played the Harp
5. "Raindance"	2025	Songwriter, additional producer	Dave	The Boy Who Played the Harp
6. "Selfish"	2025	Songwriter, co-producer (with James Blake)	Dave	The Boy Who Played the Harp
7. "My 27th Birthday"	2025	Songwriter, co-producer (with Jo Caleb & Jonny Leslie)	Dave	The Boy Who Played the Harp
8. "Marvellous"	2025	Songwriter, additional producer	Dave	The Boy Who Played the Harp
9. "Fairchild"	2025	Songwriter, co-producer (with Jo Caleb & Kyle Evans)	Dave	The Boy Who Played the Harp
16. "Regrets"	2025	Songwriter	Ed Sheeran	Play (Deluxe)
19. "Technicolour"	2025	Songwriter	Ed Sheeran	Play (Deluxe)
20. "Satellite"	2025	Songwriter, co-producer (with Ed Sheeran & Kyle Evans)	Ed Sheeran	Play (Deluxe)
22. "Fade Out"	2025	Songwriter	Ed Sheeran	Play (Deluxe)
