= The Boy Who Played the Harp Tour =

2026 concert tour by Dave

- Tour by Dave
- Location: Africa; Australia; Europe; North America
- Associated album: The Boy Who Played the Harp
- Start date: February 2, 2026
- End date: October 17, 2026
- Legs: 1
- No. of shows: 43
- Supporting acts: LostBoys; Zaylevelten

Dave concert chronology
- We're All Alone in This Together Tour (2022); The Boy Who Played the Harp Tour (2026)

The Boy Who Played the Harp Tour is the fourth concert tour by English rapper Dave in support of his third studio album, The Boy Who Played the Harp (2025). The tour commenced on 2 February 2026, in Munich, Germany, and will conclude 17 October 2026, in Lagos, Nigeria, consisting of 43 shows spanning Africa, Australia, Europe, and North America. The tour marks Dave's first in three years since his We're All Alone in This Together Tour (2022).

== Background ==
On 1 October 2025, Dave officially announced his third studio album, The Boy Who Played the Harp. On 16 October, Dave revealed the European dates of the tour from February to March 2026 while making them available for pre-order; due to the demand, several dates were added. On 24 October, the album was released to both critical acclaim and commercial success, debuting at #1 on the UK Albums Chart, moving 73,799 album-equivalent units in its first week. The record also spawned three top ten songs on the UK Singles Chart: "Raindance" (5), "History" (9), and "Chapter 16" (10). On 8 December, Dave announced additional tour dates for North America and Australia. On June 3, Dave announced dates for Africa including Pretoria, Cape Town and Lagos in October 2026.

== Critical reception ==
The tour received highly positive reviews from critics, who praised Dave's performance.

Reviewing the tour's tenth night in Glasgow, Scotland, Claire Biddles for The Guardian wrote that "the production is impressive, expanding and contracting with the show’s narrative". Biddles compared Dave's tour to those of Tyler, the Creator and Kendrick Lamar's, stating that the "show might have the scale of big US rap tours that have come through this venue", however, "Dave manages to hold on to a genuine intimacy and connection in this bombastic context". Reviewing the tour's fifth night, and Dave's first in London, England, Annabel Rackham for the BBC News wrote that "the night felt mostly like a celebration of his musical journey" and that despite Dave having the potential to sell out stadiums, "the set-up felt deliberately intimate, with a large central platform that allowed Dave to spend most of his time as close to the audience as possible". Reviewing the same night in London, Ali Shutler for The Standard described the night as "a spectacle from start to finish".

== Set list ==
This set list is representative of the show in Munich, Germany, on 2 February 2026. It does not represent all of the concerts for the duration of the tour.

1. "History"
2. "No Weapons"
3. "Verdansk"
4. "Clash"
5. "Both Sides of a Smile"
6. "Streatham"
7. "Screwface Capital"
8. "Location"
9. "3x"
10. "Wanna Know" (Remix)
11. "No Words"
12. "Funky Friday"
13. "Victory Lap Freestyle"
14. "Titanium"
15. "Incredible Sauce"
16. "Trojan Horse"
17. "UK Rap"
18. "Selfish"
19. "Marvellous"
20. "The Boy Who Played the Harp"
21. "Sprinter"
22. "Raindance"
23. "Starlight"

== Tour dates ==
Date	City	Country	Venue	Supporting act(s)	Attendance	Revenue
2 February 2026	Munich	Germany	Olympiahalle	LostBoys	TBA	TBA
4 February 2026	Paris	France	Accor Arena	LostBoys	TBA	TBA
6 February 2026	Brussels	Belgium	ING Arena	LostBoys	TBA	TBA
8 February 2026	Düsseldorf	Germany	PSD Bank Dome	LostBoys	TBA	TBA
10 February 2026	Amsterdam	Netherlands	Ziggo Dome	LostBoys	TBA	TBA
13 February 2026	Berlin	Germany	Uber Arena	LostBoys	TBA	TBA
15 February 2026	Copenhagen	Denmark	Royal Arena	LostBoys	TBA	TBA
17 February 2026	Stockholm	Sweden	Avicii Arena	LostBoys	TBA	TBA
2 March 2026	Dublin	Ireland	3Arena	LostBoys	TBA	TBA
4 March 2026	Glasgow	Scotland	OVO Hydro	LostBoys	TBA	TBA
6 March 2026	London	England	The O2 Arena	LostBoys	TBA	TBA
7 March 2026	London	England	The O2 Arena	LostBoys	TBA	TBA
10 March 2026	London	England	The O2 Arena	LostBoys	TBA	TBA
11 March 2026	London	England	The O2 Arena	LostBoys	TBA	TBA
13 March 2026	Birmingham	England	Utilita Arena	LostBoys	TBA	TBA
16 March 2026	Manchester	England	Co-op Live	LostBoys	TBA	TBA
17 March 2026	Manchester	England	Co-op Live	LostBoys	TBA	TBA
27 March 2026	Seattle	United States	The Showbox	—N/a	TBA	TBA
28 March 2026	Vancouver	Canada	Thunderbird Sports Centre	—N/a	TBA	TBA
31 March 2026	Oakland	United States	Fox Theatre	—N/a	TBA	TBA
3 April 2026	Los Angeles	United States	Hollywood Palladium	—N/a	TBA	TBA
7 April 2026	Denver	United States	Summit Music Hall	—N/a	TBA	TBA
10 April 2026	Dallas	United States	South Side Ballroom	—N/a	TBA	TBA
11 April 2026	Houston	United States	Bayou Music Center	—N/a	TBA	TBA
14 April 2026	Atlanta	United States	Coca-Cola Roxy	—N/a	TBA	TBA
17 April 2026	Philadelphia	United States	The Fillmore	—N/a	TBA	TBA
18 April 2026	Washington, D.C.	United States	The Anthem	—N/a	TBA	TBA
20 April 2026	Chicago	United States	The Salt Shed	—N/a	TBA	TBA
23 April 2026	Toronto	Canada	Coca-Cola Coliseum	—N/a	TBA	TBA
25 April 2026	Laval	Canada	Place Bell	—N/a	TBA	TBA
27 April 2026	Boston	United States	MGM Music Hall at Fenway	—N/a	TBA	TBA
30 April 2026	Brooklyn	United States	Brooklyn Paramount	—N/a	TBA	TBA
1 May 2026	Brooklyn	United States	Brooklyn Paramount	—N/a	TBA	TBA
18 June 2026	Brisbane	Australia	Brisbane Entertainment Centre	—N/a	TBA	TBA
20 June 2026	Sydney	Australia	Sydney SuperDome	—N/a	TBA	TBA
23 June 2026	Melbourne	Australia	Rod Laver Arena	—N/a	TBA	TBA
27 June 2026	Perth	Australia	Perth Arena	—N/a	TBA	TBA
29 August 2026 (Note: This concert is part of Reading and Leeds Festivals.)	Reading	England	Little John's Farm	—N/a	TBA	TBA
30 August 2026 (Note: This concert is part of Reading and Leeds Festivals.)	Leeds	England	Bramham Park	—N/a	TBA	TBA
3 October 2026	Pretoria	South Africa	SunBet Arena	—N/a	TBA	TBA
6 October 2026	Cape Town	South Africa	Grand Arena at GrandWest	—N/a	TBA	TBA
16 October 2026	Lagos	Nigeria	National Arts Theatre	—N/a	TBA	TBA
17 October 2026	Lagos	Nigeria	National Arts Theatre	—N/a	TBA	TBA
Total					TBA	TBA

=== Notes ===
- During the February 4 show in Paris, Tiakola joined Dave on-stage to perform "Meridian".
- During the March 4 show in Glasgow, James Blake joined Dave on-stage to perform "History".
- During the March 6 show in London, James Blake joined Dave on-stage to perform "History".
- During the March 7 show in London, James Blake joined Dave on-stage to perform "History"; Tems joined Dave on-stage to perform "Raindance", and Stormzy joined Dave on-stage to perform "Clash".
- During the March 16 show in Manchester, Kano joined Dave on-stage to perform "Chapter 16".
