= 18Hunna =

2019 single by Headie One featuring Dave

Single by Headie One featuring Dave

from the album Music x Road
- Released: January 3, 2019
- Genre: UK drill
- Length: 3:09
- Label: Relentless
- Songwriter(s): Irving Adjei; David Omoregie
- Producer(s): Tyrell 169

Headie One singles chronology
"Know Better" (2016)	"18Hunna" (2019)	"Both" (2019)

Dave singles chronology
"Funky Friday" (2018)	"18Hunna" (2019)	"All I Ever Wanted" (2019)

Music video
- "18Hunna" on YouTube

"18Hunna" is a song written and performed by British rappers Headie One featuring Dave, released on January 3, 2019, by Relentless Records. It served as the lead single to Headie One's fourth mixtape, Music x Road (2019). The song peaked at number 6 on the UK Singles Chart, making it Headie's first top-ten UK single and Dave's second.

== Background ==
The song went viral before its release after Headie One shared a 10-second music video clip, which sparked the "#18HUNNACHALLENGE", bringing even more attention to the track.

== Critical reception ==
Writing for NME, Jordan Bassett wrote that "the song’s perfection of the drill sound is dwarfed".

== Music video ==
The Nathan James Tettey-directed music video is in a black and white theme which sees Headie One and Dave in a warehouse with heaps of money and a classic Aston Martin DB5 playing a main role in the video as it's seen in several scenes throughout it.

== Charts ==
Weekly chart performance for "18Hunna"
Chart (2019)	Peak position
Ireland (IRMA)	75
UK Singles (OCC)	6
UK Hip Hop/R&B (OCC)	3

== Certifications ==
Region	Certification	Certified units/sales
United Kingdom (BPI)	Gold	400,000^{‡}
^{‡} Sales+streaming figures based on certification alone.
