= In the Fire =

In the Fire may refer to:

- "In the Fire" (song), a 2021 single from the Dave album We're All Alone in This Together
- In the Fire (film), a 2023 American-Italian film, directed by Conor Allyn
