= Brit Award for British Rock/Alternative Act =

British music award

Brit Award for British Alternative/Rock Act
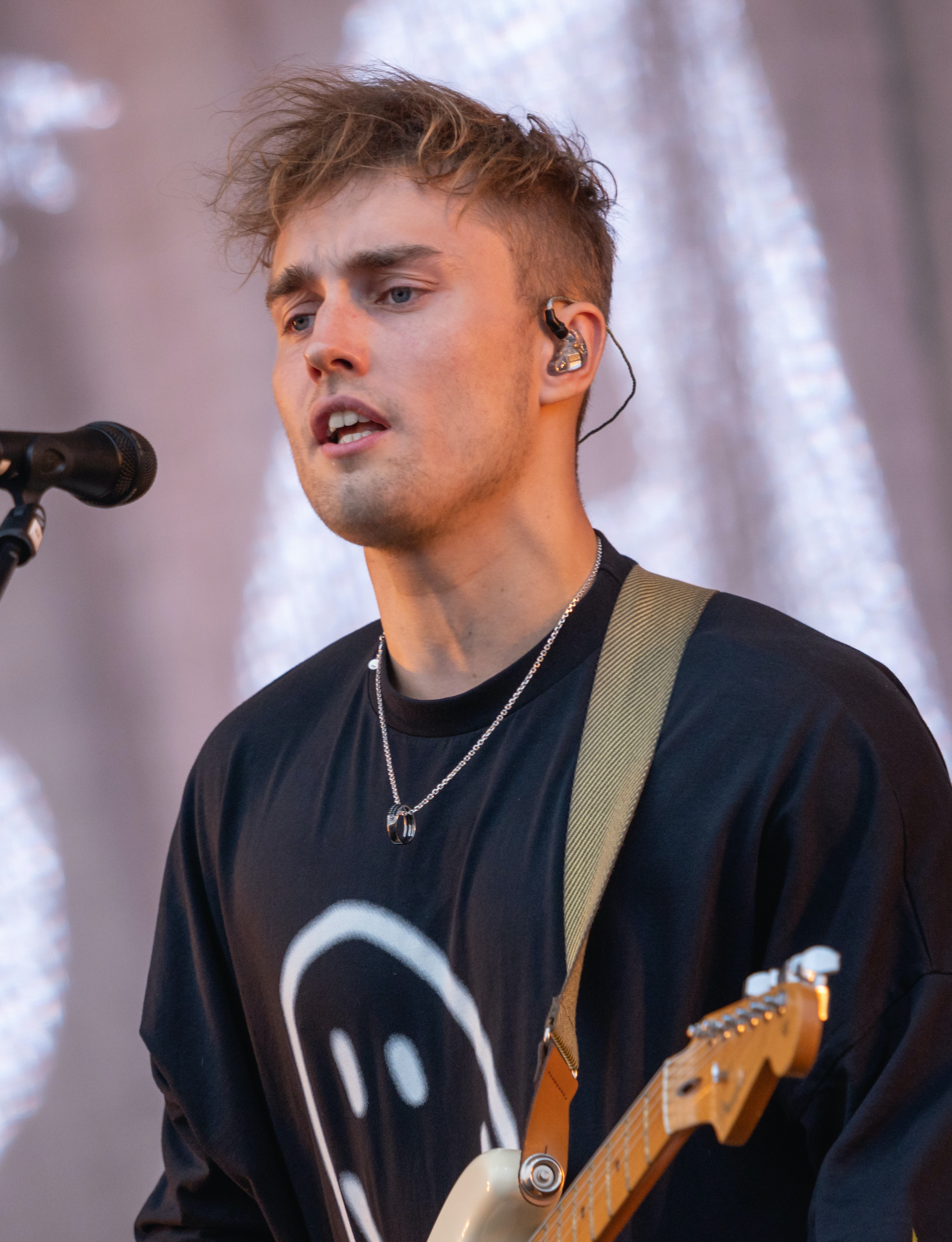
- 2026 winner Sam Fender
- Awarded for: Achievement in Excellence: British Rock Act
- Country: United Kingdom (UK)
- Presented by: British Phonographic Industry (BPI)
- First award: 2004
- Currently held by: Sam Fender (2026)

Highlights
- Most awards: Sam Fender (3)
- Most nominations: Sam Fender (3)
- Website: www.brits.co.uk

The Brit Award for British Alternative/Rock Act (previously known as the Brit Award for British Rock Act) is an award given by the British Phonographic Industry (BPI), an organisation which represents record companies and artists in the United Kingdom. The accolade was presented at the Brit Awards, an annual celebration of British and international music. The winners and nominees were determined by the Brit Awards voting academy with over one-thousand members comprising record labels, publishers, managers, agents, media, and previous winners and nominees.

The inaugural recipients of the award are The Darkness, who won in 2004. The category only featured bands as nominees until it was revived in 2022. Muse, Kasabian and Tom Grennan hold the record for most nominations without a win, with two. Sam Fender is the first solo artist to win the category, and is the current holder after two consecutive wins in 2025 and 2026, winning all three of his nominations.

== History ==
The Brit Award for British Rock Act was first presented at the 2004 Brit Awards and last presented in 2006.

In 2021, it was announced that the category had been revived and renamed British Rock/Alternative Act following the removal of gendered categories. This new iteration of the award was first presented at the 42nd Brit Awards and is voted for by the public on TikTok alongside the three other genre categories (Pop/R&B Act, Dance Act and Hip Hop/Grime/Rap Act).

== Winners and nominees ==
=== British Rock Act (2004–2006) ===
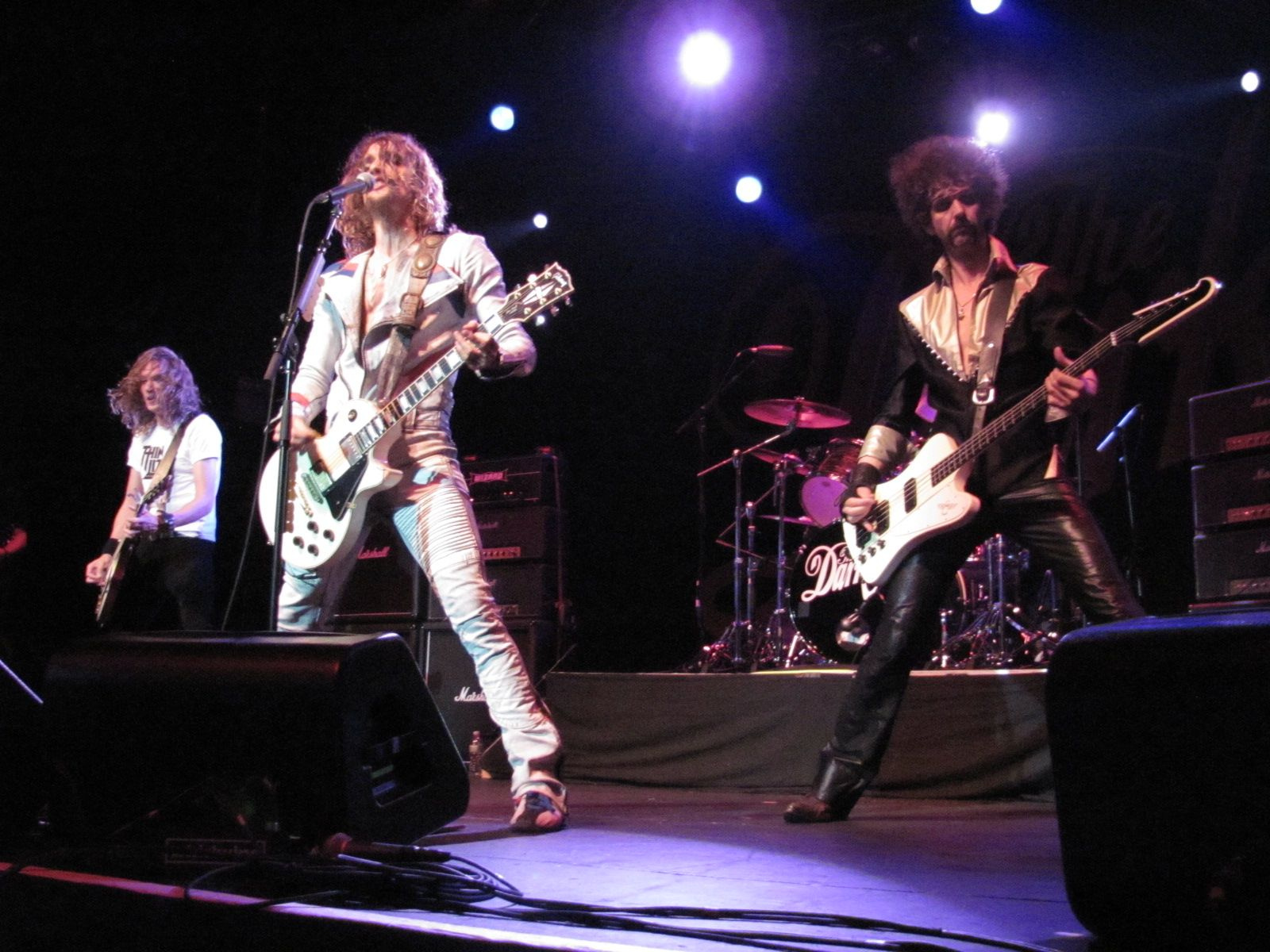
2004 winners The Darkness

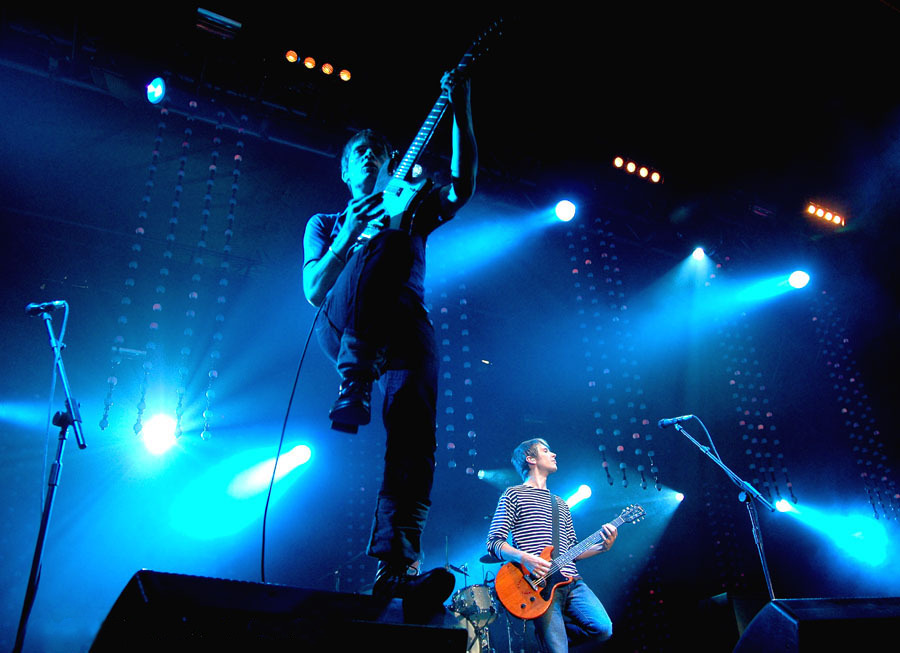
2005 winners Franz Ferdinand

Year	Recipient	Nominees
2004	The Darkness	Feeder; Muse; Primal Scream; Stereophonics
2005	Franz Ferdinand	Kasabian; The Libertines; Muse; Snow Patrol
2006	Kaiser Chiefs	Franz Ferdinand; Hard-Fi; Kasabian; Oasis

=== British Rock/Alternative Act (2022–present) ===
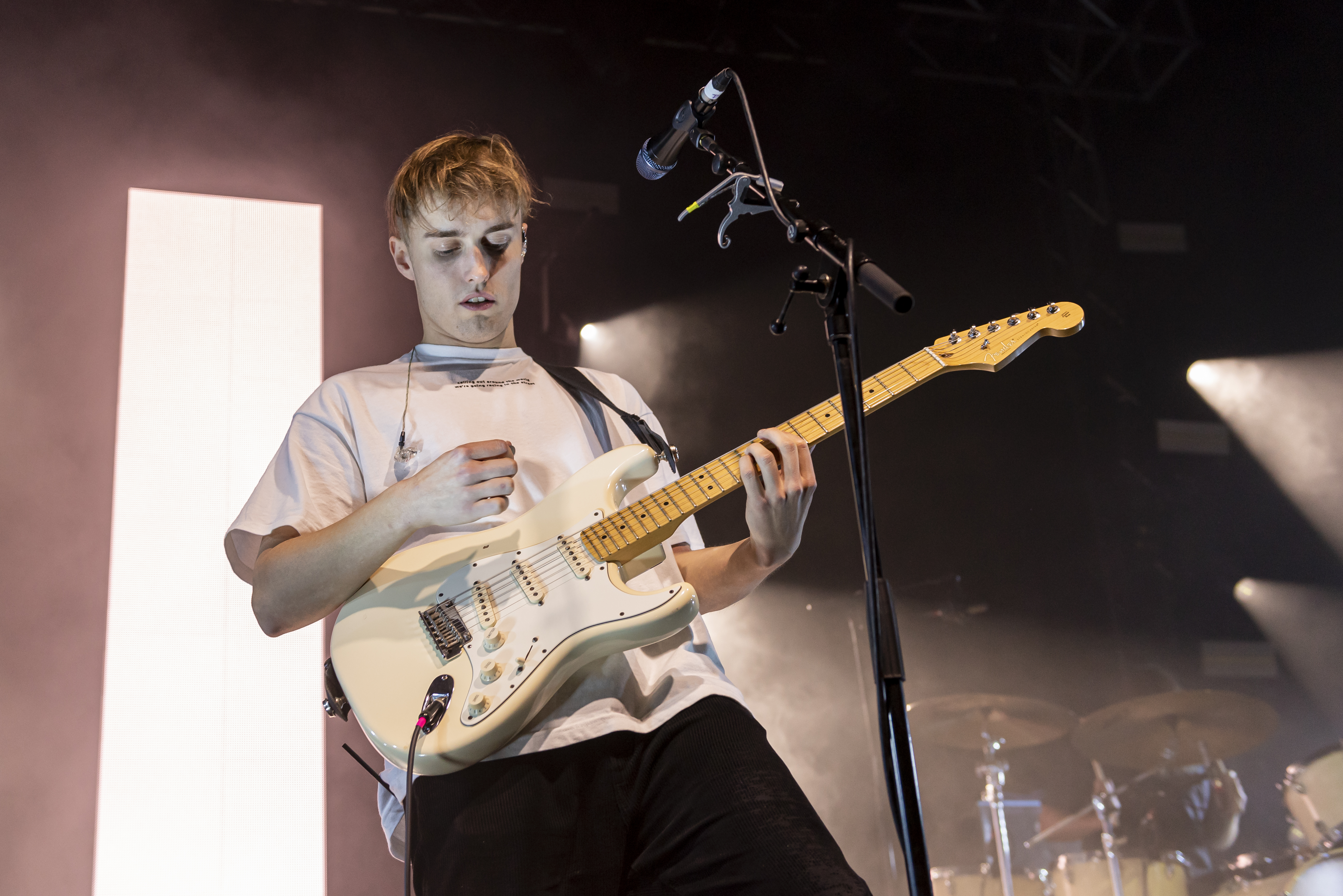
Sam Fender was the inaugural winner of the 2022 revived category

Year	Recipient	Nominees
2022	Sam Fender	Coldplay; Glass Animals; Tom Grennan; Wolf Alice
2023	The 1975	Arctic Monkeys; Nova Twins; Tom Grennan; Wet Leg
2024	Bring Me The Horizon	Blur; The Rolling Stones; Young Fathers; Yussef Dayes
2025	Sam Fender	Beabadoobee; The Cure; Ezra Collective; The Last Dinner Party
2026	Sam Fender	Blood Orange; Lola Young; Wet Leg; Wolf Alice

== Multiple nominations and awards ==
Nominations	Artist
3	Sam Fender
2	Franz Ferdinand
2	Kasabian
2	Muse
2	Tom Grennan
2	Wet Leg
2	Wolf Alice
