= In the Fire (song) =

2021 song by Dave

Song by Dave

from the album We're All Alone in This Together
- Released: 23 July 2021
- Length: 7:04
- Label: Neighbourhood
- Songwriter(s): David Omoregie; Kyle Evans; James Litherland; Dominic Maker; Marvin Bailey; Nathaniel Thompson; Justin Clarke; Mico Howles; Milton Biggham
- Producer(s): Dave; Kyle Evans; James Blake; Dom Maker

Audio video
- "In the Fire" on YouTube

"In the Fire" is a song by British rapper Dave, featuring other British rappers such as Fredo, Meekz, Ghetts, Giggs, and Nathan James Tettey. It also features an intro and bridge from Milton Biggham of The Florida Mass Choir. It was released on 23 July 2021 by Dave and Neighbourhood Recordings on Dave's second studio album, We're All Alone in This Together.

== Background ==
After attending the Brit Awards 2022 and winning the award for the best British Hip Hop/Grime/Rap Act, Dave, alongside Fredo, Meekz, Ghetts and Giggs, performed "In the Fire" at the award show while Dave also played a guitar solo.

== Composition ==
"In the Fire" is a British hip hop track with elements of UK drill and gospel music. The song's production is described as a "Kanye-style chipmunked gospel beat".

== Critical reception ==
Writing for The Daily Telegraph, Thomas Hobbs described the track as a "soulful posse cut", noting that it is "a welcome change of pace, with each emcee approaching their verse like they’re giving a ghetto sermon in a Church". For DIY, Sean Kerwick stated that "Fredo and Ghetts cut through with their razor-sharp delivery before Giggs steps into frame with that unmistakable baritone" before concluding that each artists are "given a moment to trace their story from hard beginnings to the status they’ve climbed to". Writing for The Guardian, Rachel Aroesti described the track as "a gospel-butressed production involving London indie-electronic duo Mount Kimbie". The Line of Best Fit's Kyann-Sian Williams' take from the track is that "Dave uses gospel to speak on being tried in the flames". The Independent's Helen Brown states that the "gospel-powered" track emphasizes the posse's "tales of surviving urban violence".

== Personnel ==
Credits and personnel adapted from Tidal.

Musicians

- David Omoregie – lead artist, production, vocals, songwriter, composer
- Marvin Bailey – vocals, songwriter, composer
- Nathaniel Thompson – vocals, songwriter, composer
- Justin Clarke| – vocals, songwriter, composer
- Mico Howles| – vocals, songwriter, composer
- Kyle Evans – production, composer, songwriter
- James Blake – production, composer, songwriter
- Dom Maker – production, composer, songwriter
- Milton Biggham – vocals, songwriter
- Nathan James Tettey – vocals

Technical

- Leandro “Dro” Hidalgo – mixing
- Jonny Leslie – recording

== Charts ==
Chart (2021)	Peak position
UK (Official Charts Company)	6
UK R&B Chart (Official Charts Company)	3

== Certifications ==
Region	Certification	Certified units/sales
United Kingdom (BPI)	Gold	400,000^{‡}
^{‡} Sales+streaming figures based on certification alone.
