= My 24th Birthday =

Single by Dave
- Released: 24 June 2022
- Genre: Hip hop
- Length: 6:23
- Label: Dave; Neighbourhood
- Songwriter: David Omoregie
- Producer: Dave

Dave singles chronology
"Starlight" (2022)	"My 24th Birthday" (2022)	"Sprinter" (2023)

Music video
- "My 24th Birthday" on YouTube

"My 24th Birthday" is a song by British rapper Dave. It was released on June 24, 2022, two weeks after his twenty-fourth birthday, through Dave and Neighbourhood Recordings. The song was written and produced by Dave himself. It debuted at number-forty-eight in both the UK Singles Chart and number-forty-five on the Irish Singles Chart.

== Composition and lyrics ==
A self-produced track, lyrically, the song "takes stock of everything that’s happened, from his towering, historic achievements to some of the less savoury sides of fame". James Keith for Complex UK writes that Dave "takes a moment to look outwards, unpacking everything from casual street violence to the ills of late-stage capitalism as well as sharing his thoughts on manhood, his faith and wanting the best for his mother and friends". The song is lyrically broken down in different parts, at the start of the track, "Dave shows the contrast between his current circumstance" as he raps about how he is in "a calm, joyful environment surrounded by family and loved ones" to "where he has come from to reach this point". Throughout the track, "Dave gives listeners a usual dose of punchy lines and double entendres"

== Critical reception ==
Writing for Medium, Wepea Buntugu writes that "the choice of subject matter is not the impressive part; the variety is", noting that Dave glides "nimbly over the whirring and humming instrumental he fits references to his girl problems in between ruminations about commitment, fatherhood and the double-edged sword of amassing wealth". Buntugu noted that "sonically, the track is not a great departure from Dave’s usual style" and that "his lyricism and the stories he tells are his strengths and even though it would be great to see more experimentation on the instrumental side of things, these unencumbered canvasses are perfect for the narrative he paints on his tracks". They also noted that the track "reminds us of that fact as well as showing the world that he is still growing and that growth is not stopping anytime soon".

== Personnel ==
Credits and personnel adapted from Tidal.

Musicians

- David Omoregie – lead artist, production, vocals, songwriter, composer
- Jo Caleb – Keyboards

Technical

- Jonny Leslie – mastering, mixing

== Charts ==
Weekly chart performance for "My 24th Birthday"
Chart (2022)	Peak position
Ireland (IRMA)	45
UK Singles (OCC)	48
UK Hip Hop/R&B (OCC)	15
