= Brit Award for British Artist of the Year =

British music award

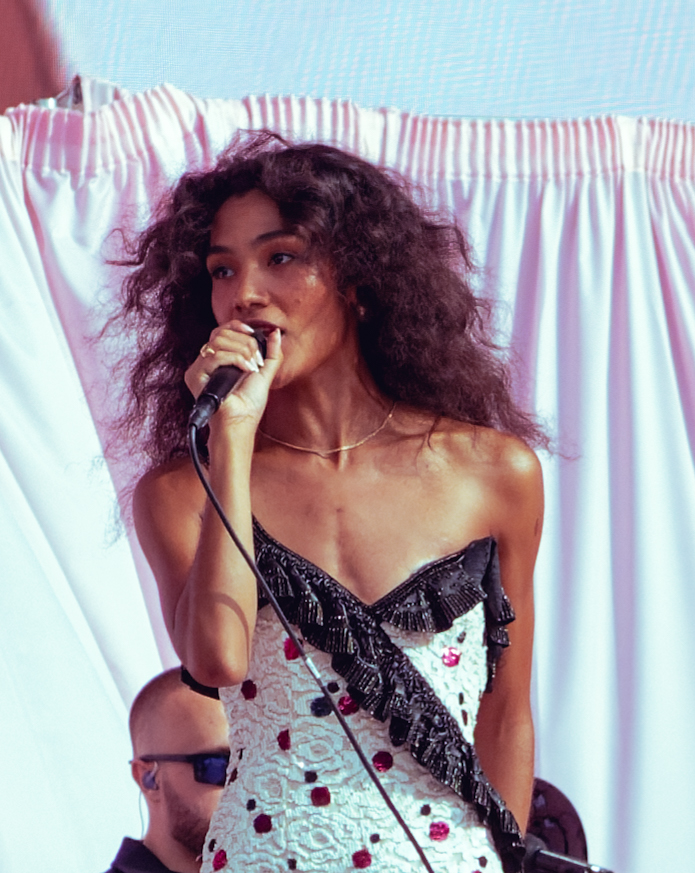
- 2026 winner: Olivia Dean
- Awarded for: British Artist of the Year
- Country: United Kingdom (UK)
- Presented by: British Phonographic Industry (BPI)
- First award: 2022
- Currently held by: Olivia Dean (2026)

Highlights
- Most awards: None
- Website: www.brits.co.uk

The Brit Award for British Artist of the Year is an award given by the British Phonographic Industry (BPI), an organisation which represents record companies and artists in the United Kingdom. The accolade is presented at the Brit Awards, an annual celebration of British and international music. The winners and nominees are determined by the Brit Awards voting academy with over one thousand members, which comprise record labels, publishers, managers, agents, media, and previous winners and nominees.

The current holder of the award is Olivia Dean, who won in 2026.

== History ==
The category was introduced in 2022 and combined the previous categories for British Female Solo Artist and British Male Solo Artist. The restructuring of these categories was a result of the Academy's wish to eliminate the distinctions between male and female artists and replace it with new gender-neutral category. This category is intended to honour solo artists, as groups are still nominated in the British Group category.

Following an all-male shortlist in 2023, the list of nominees was expanded from five to ten beginning with the 2024 Brit Awards in an effort to increase diversity.

== Eligibility ==
In order to be eligible for the Artist of the Year award, "an artist must have achieved at least one top 40 album or two top 20 singles" during the Brits eligibility period, which generally runs from early December of one year to a similar date of the following year (e.g. the eligibility period for the 2023 Brit awards was 10 December 2021 to 9 December 2022). To determine the nominees for the category, record labels are invited to submit their eligible artists for consideration for the members of the BPI to vote on. Each of the approximately 1,200 members chooses their personal top five in order of preference and the votes are counted to produce the shortlist of five nominees.

== Winners and nominees ==
Year	Recipient	Nominee
2022 (42nd)	Adele	Dave; Sam Fender; Little Simz; Ed Sheeran
2023 (43rd)	Harry Styles	Central Cee; Fred Again; George Ezra; Stormzy
2024 (44th)	Raye	Arlo Parks; Central Cee; Dave; Dua Lipa; Fred Again; J Hus; Jessie Ware; Little Simz; Olivia Dean
2025 (45th)	Charli XCX	Beabadoobee; Central Cee; Dua Lipa; Fred Again; Jamie xx; Michael Kiwanuka; Nia Archives; Rachel Chinouriri; Sam Fender
2026 (46th)	Olivia Dean	Dave; Fred Again; JADE; Lily Allen; Little Simz; Lola Young; PinkPantheress; Sam Fender; Self Esteem

== Artists with multiple nominations ==
4 nominations

- Fred Again

3 nominations

- Central Cee
- Dave
- Little Simz
- Sam Fender

2 nominations

- Dua Lipa
- Olivia Dean

== Controversy ==
In 2023, the awards attracted controversy due to all five nominees for the solo award being male.

== See also ==
- Brit Award for International Solo Artist

== Notes ==
- Adele (2008) also won the Brit Award for Rising Star
- Adele (2012, 2016) also won the Brit Award for British Female Solo Artist
