= Brit Award for British Hip Hop/Grime/Rap Act =

British music award

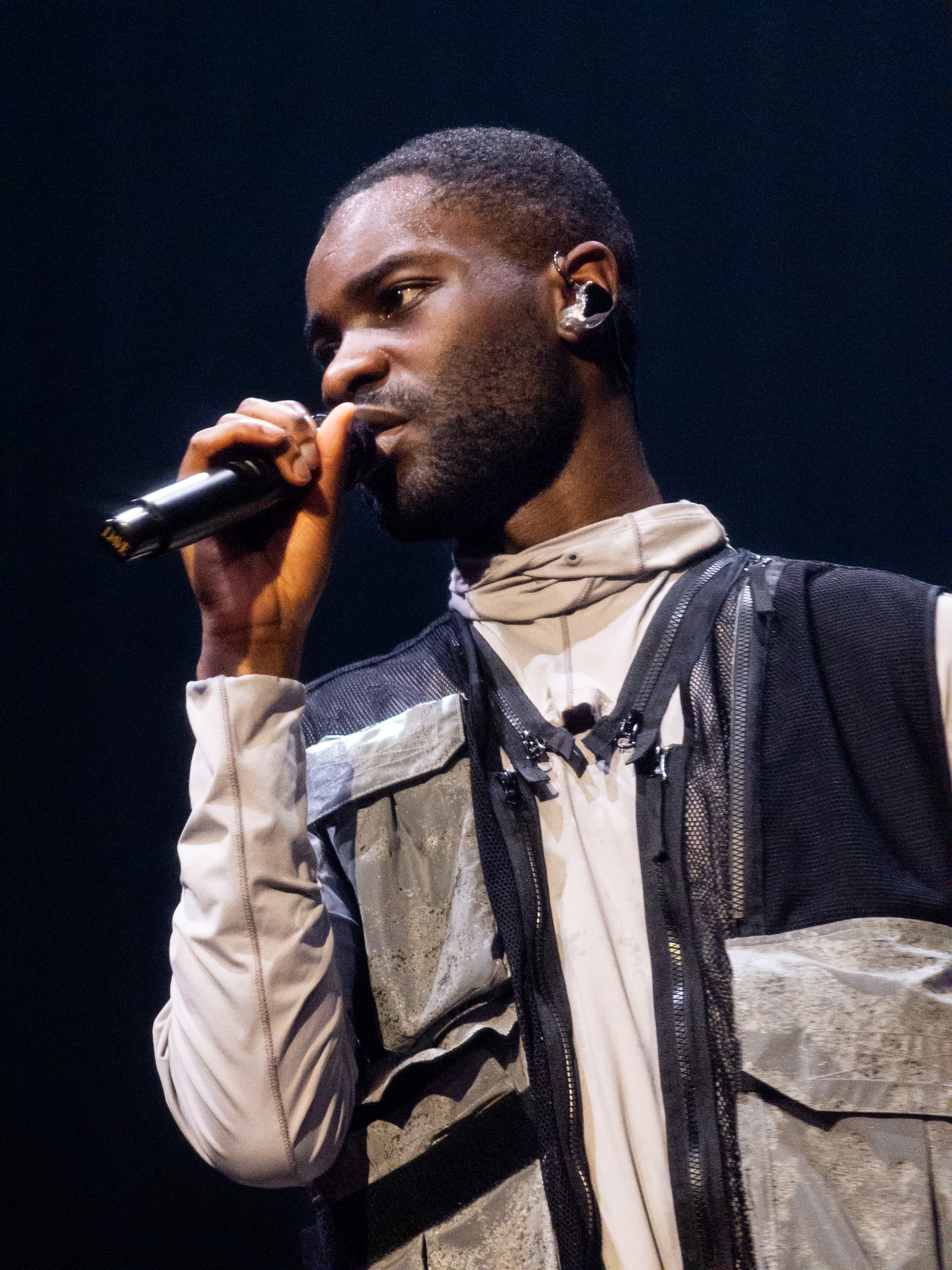
- 2026 winner Dave
- Awarded for: Achievement in Excellence: British Hip Hop/Grime/Rap Act
- Country: United Kingdom (UK)
- Presented by: British Phonographic Industry (BPI)
- First award: 2003
- Currently held by: Dave (2026)

Highlights
- Most awards: Dave; Lemar (2 each)
- Most nominations: Dizzee Rascal; Lemar (3 each)
- Website: www.brits.co.uk

The Brit Award for British Hip Hop/Grime/Rap Act is an award given by the British Phonographic Industry (BPI), an organisation which represents record companies and artists in the United Kingdom. The accolade was presented at the Brit Awards, an annual celebration of British and international music. The winners and nominees were determined by the Brit Awards voting academy with over one-thousand members comprising record labels, publishers, managers, agents, media, and previous winners and nominees.

The first winner of the award was Ms. Dynamite in 2003. Lemar is the only two-time winner in the category while Dizzee Rascal holds the record for most nominations without a win, with three. The current holder of the award is Dave, who won the category in 2026.

== History ==
The award was first presented as Best British Urban Act at the 2003 Brit Awards and last presented in 2006.

In 2021, it was announced that the category had been revived and renamed Best British Hip Hop/Grime/Rap Act following the removal of gendered categories. This new iteration of the award was first presented at the 42nd Brit Awards and is voted for by the public along with the three other genre categories (Pop/R&B Act, Dance Act and Rock/Alternative Act).

== Winners and nominees ==
=== British Urban Act (2003–2006) ===
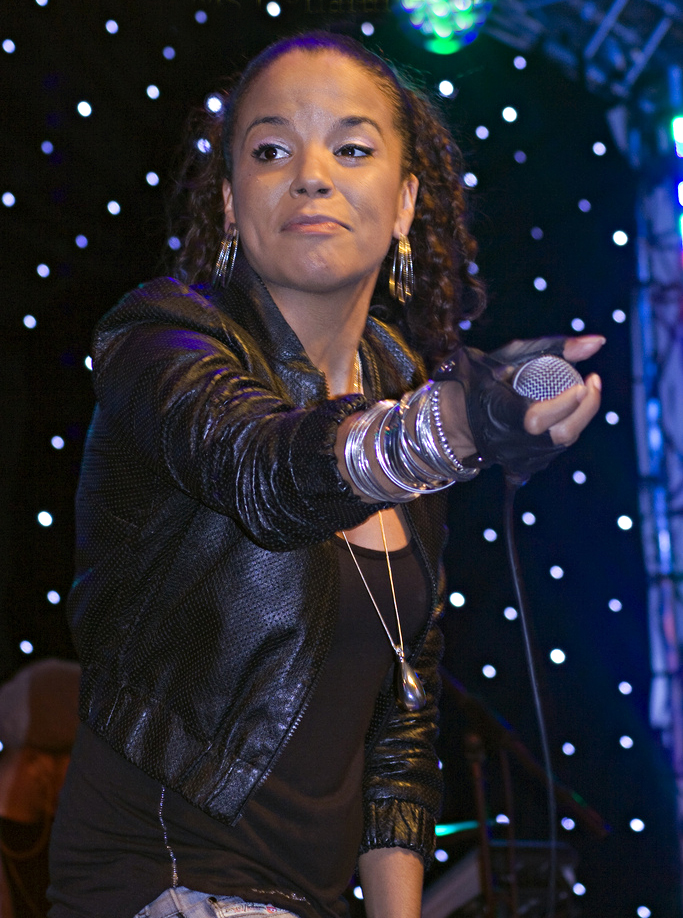
Inaugural winner Ms. Dynamite

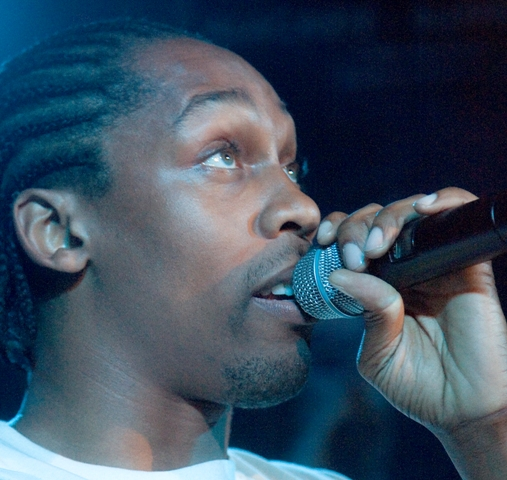
Two-time winner Lemar

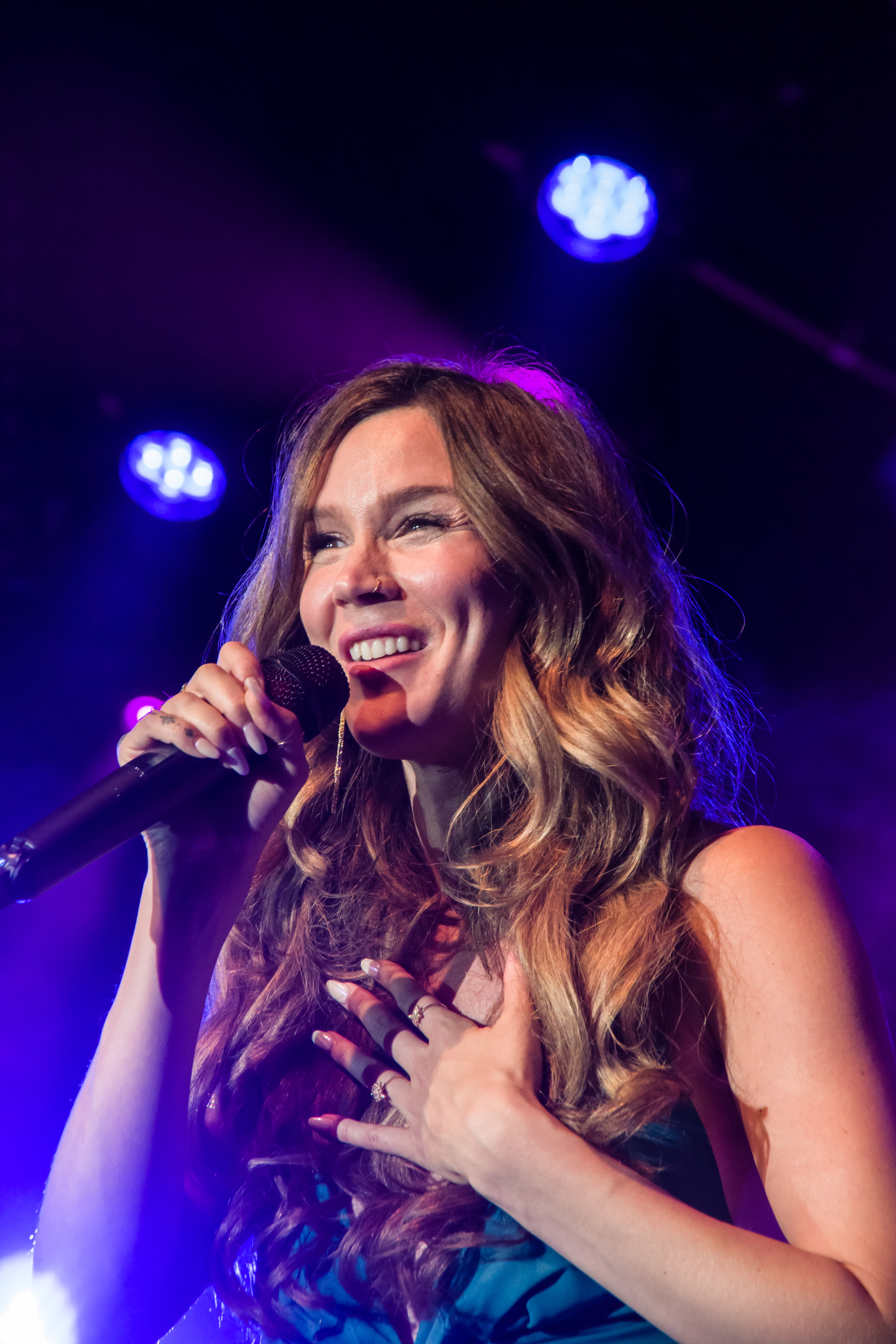
2005 winner Joss Stone

Year	Recipient	Nominees
2003	Ms. Dynamite	Daniel Bedingfield; Big Brovaz; Craig David; Beverley Knight; Mis-Teeq; Romeo; Roots Manuva; So Solid Crew; The Streets
2004	Lemar	Big Brovaz; Dizzee Rascal; Mis-Teeq; Amy Winehouse
2005	Joss Stone	Dizzee Rascal; Jamelia; Lemar; The Streets
2006	Lemar	Craig David; Dizzee Rascal; Kano; Ms. Dynamite

=== British Hip Hop/Grime/Rap Act (2022–present) ===
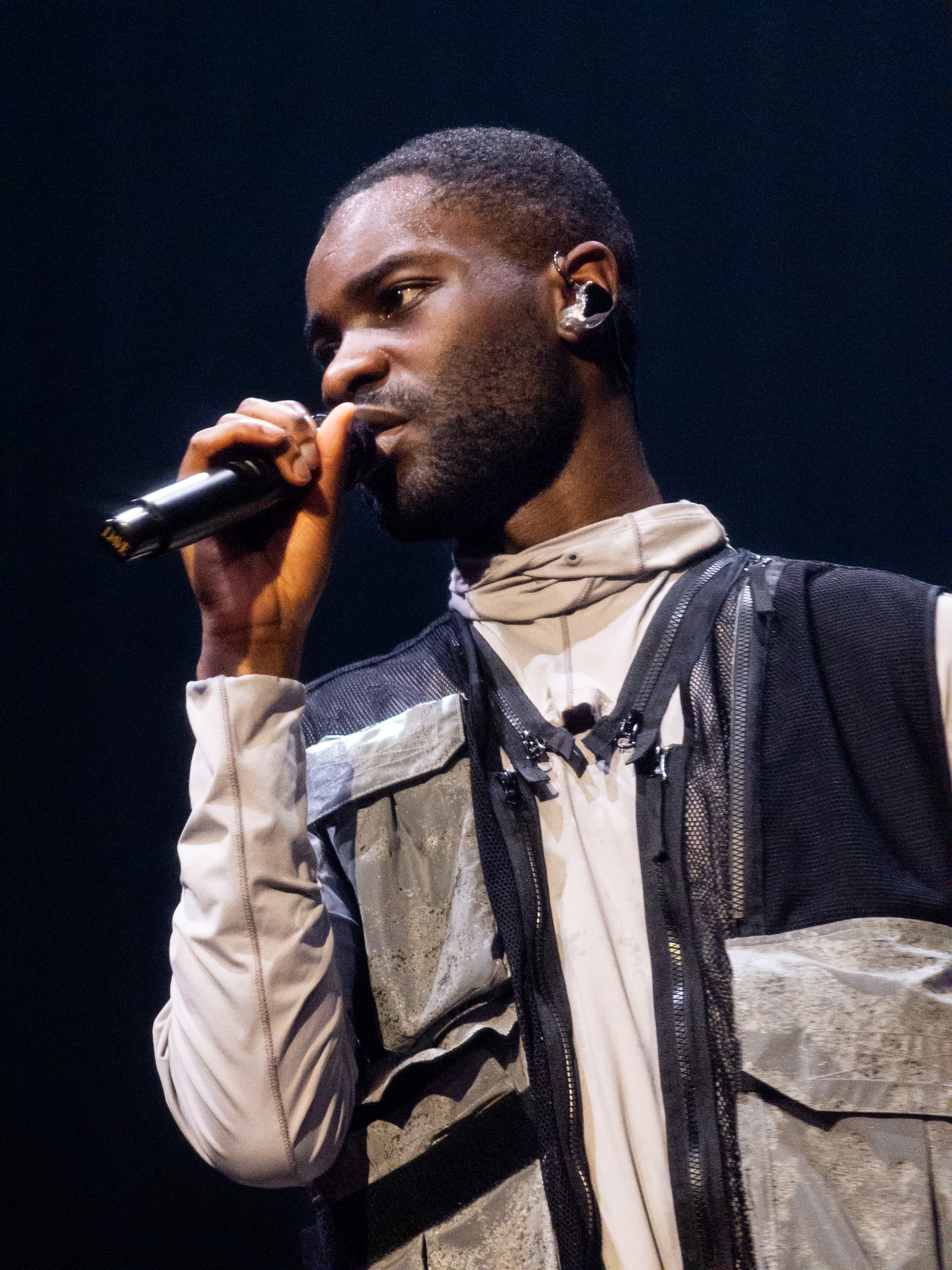
Dave received the first award when the category was revived and renamed in 2022

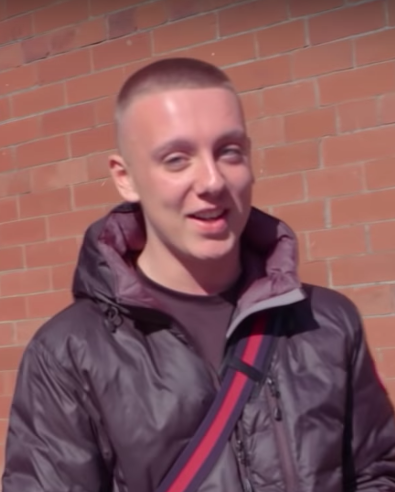
2023 winner Aitch

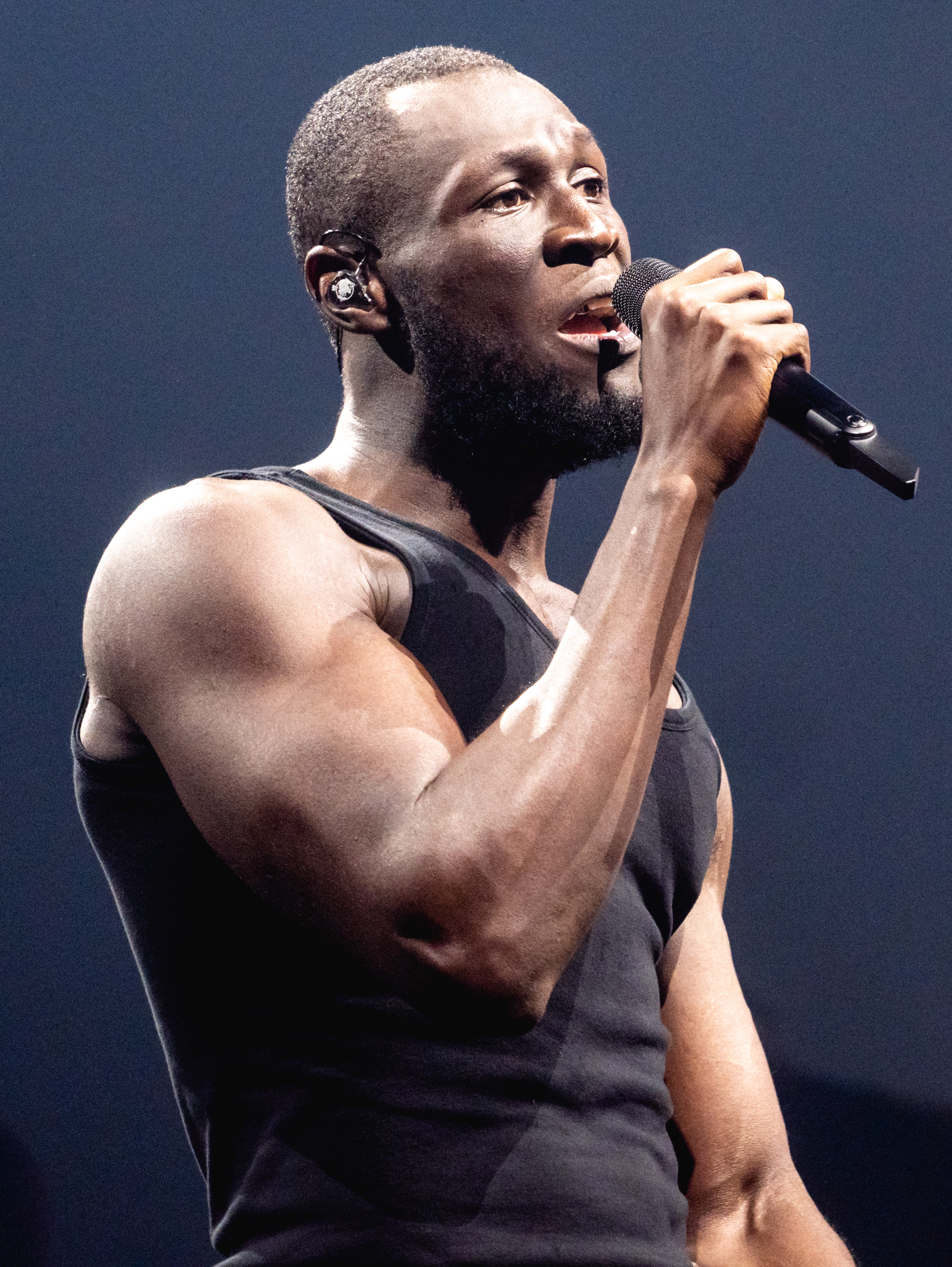
2025 winner Stormzy

Year	Recipient	Nominees
2022	Dave	Central Cee; Ghetts; Little Simz; AJ Tracey
2023	Aitch	Central Cee; Dave; Loyle Carner; Stormzy
2024	Casisdead	Central Cee; Dave; J Hus; Little Simz
2025	Stormzy	Central Cee; Dave; Ghetts; Little Simz
2026	Dave	Central Cee; Jim Legxacy; Little Simz; Loyle Carner

== Multiple nominations and awards ==
Artists that received multiple nominations
Nominations	Artist
5	Central Cee
5	Dave
4	Little Simz
3
3	Dizzee Rascal
3	Lemar
2	Big Brovaz
2	Craig David
2	Ghetts
2	Loyle Carner
2	Mis-Teeq
2	Ms. Dynamite
2	Stormzy
2	The Streets

Artists that received multiple awards
Awards	Artist
2	Lemar

== Notes ==
- Ms. Dynamite (2003), Joss Stone (2005) also won Brit Award for British Female Solo Artist
