= Music x Road =

Mixtape by Headie One
- Released: 23 August 2019
- Genre: UK drill
- Length: 45:53
- Label: Relentless

Headie One chronology
Drillers x Trappers II (2019)	Music x Road (2019)	Gang (2020)

Singles from Music x Road
- 1. "18Hunna" Released: 6 January 2019; 2. "All Day" Released: 4 May 2019; 3. "Back to Basics" Released: 4 July 2019; 4. "Both" Released: 15 August 2019

Music x Road is a commercial mixtape by British rapper Headie One. It was released by Relentless Records on 23 August 2019. It features guest appearances from Dave, Skepta, Stefflon Don, Nav, Lotto Ash, RV, and Krept and Konan. All featured artists are fellow British rappers also, with the exception of Nav, who is Canadian. The mixtape peaked at number 5 on the UK Albums Chart.

== Critical reception ==
Professional ratings
Review scores
Source	Rating
The Guardian	4/5 stars
NME	4/5 stars

Jordan Bassett of NME gave the mixtape 4 out of 5 stars, writing, "what is really impressive about Music x Road is its breadth of sound and ambition." The Guardian's Al Horner, who also gave the mixtape 4 out of 5 stars, commented that "Claustrophobia and regret sit like a smog across its entire 45-minute runtime."

== Track listing ==
Songwriting credits adapted from Tidal.

Music x Road track listing
No.	Title	Writer(s)	Producer(s)	Length
1.	"Music x Road"	Irving Adjei; Michael Brooks	Nastylgia	3:12
2.	"Both"	Adjei; John Ciafone; Lem Springsteen; Ultra Nate Wyche	Nastylgia; PJ Pipe it Up	3:33
3.	"Ball in Peace"	Adjei	The Writers Block	2:23
4.	"Rubbery Bandz"	Adjei	I.O	3:06
5.	"18Hunna" (featuring Dave)	Adjei; David Omoregie	169; Stuart Hawkes	3:09
6.	"Back to Basics" (featuring Skepta)	Adjei; Joseph Adenuga	Nyge	3:14
7.	"All Day"	Adjei	M1OnTheBeat	3:21
8.	"Kettle Water"	Adjei	Madara Beatz	2:55
9.	"Interlude: 100 Bottles"	Adjei	Guilty Beatz	2:00
10.	"Home"	Adjei; Sean Combs; Faith Evans; James Grant; Darius Forde; Carl Thompson	iLL BLU	3:40
11.	"Swerve" (featuring Stefflon Don and Nav)	Adjei; Stephanie Allen; Navraj Goraya	Rymez; ADP	2:36
12.	"Chanel" (featuring Lotto Ash)	Adjei; Imrhan Kirnon	Nyge; TSB	3:00
13.	"Let's Go" (featuring RV and Krept and Konan)	Adjei; Jordan Townsend; Casyo Johnson; Janayd Wilson	Sykesbeats; Ghosty	3:38
14.	"Nearly Died"	Adjei	Rex Kudo; Sevn Thomas	2:42
15.	"Numbed Down"	Adjei	Sykesbeats; Ghosty	3:14
Total length:				46:08

== Charts ==
Chart performance for Music x Road
Chart (2019)	Peak position
Irish Albums (IRMA)	71
UK Albums (OCC)	5
UK R&B Albums (OCC)	4

== Certifications ==
Certifications for Music x Road
Region	Certification	Certified units/sales
United Kingdom (BPI)	Silver	60,000^{‡}
^{‡} Sales+streaming figures based on certification alone.
