= Starlight (Dave song) =

Single by Dave
- Released: 3 March 2022
- Genre: Hip hop; UK drill
- Length: 3:31
- Label: Dave; Neighbourhood
- Songwriter: David Omoregie
- Producer: Dave

Dave singles chronology
| "Verdansk" (2021) | "Starlight" (2022) | "My 24th Birthday" (2022) |

Music video
- "Starlight" on YouTube

"Starlight" is a song by British rapper Dave. It was released on 3 March 2022 through Dave and Neighbourhood Recordings. The song was written and produced by Dave himself. It debuted at number-one in both the UK Singles Chart and the Irish Singles Chart, becoming Dave's second number-one single in the UK, after "Funky Friday" in 2018, and his first in Ireland. It was nominated for Song of the Year at the 2023 Brit Awards.

== Composition ==
A self-produced track, the song samples a rendition of Bart Howard's 1954 standard "Fly Me to the Moon", by Indonesian duo ‘The Macarons Project’ in 2018. Lyrics include references to the song itself, American rapper Meek Mill, Jamaica and his home South London. Having found his significant other, he describes his wish to settle down. He also flexes career highlights and changes in his life. The "subtle" and "wavy" song is built around a "hummed melody" and a "minimal beat" that puts "bars front and centre". The song was seen as separation from his usual sound, pivoting between "UK drill elements and something a little more trans-Atlantic".

== Music video ==
The music video was released on 3 March 2022. It was directed by Nathan Tettey, alongside Dave himself. The video takes place at a luxurious apartment and shows Dave and Corteiz founder Clint wearing latest fits. On top, it features models walking down a runway, as well as Dave and some friends posing for mugshots.

== Commercial performance ==
On 11 March 2022, "Starlight" entered the UK Singles Chart at number one. It also debuted at number 35 on the Official Singles Sales Chart Top 100.

== Charts ==
=== Weekly charts ===
Weekly chart performance for "Starlight"
| Chart (2022) | Peak position |
|---|---|
| Australia (ARIA) | 8 |
| Canada Hot 100 (Billboard) | 57 |
| Denmark (Tracklisten) | 7 |
| Global 200 (Billboard) | 58 |
| Greece International (IFPI) | 15 |
| Iceland (Tónlistinn) | 8 |
| Ireland (IRMA) | 1 |
| Lithuania (AGATA) | 46 |
| Netherlands (Single Top 100) | 26 |
| New Zealand (Recorded Music NZ) | 6 |
| Norway (VG-lista) | 31 |
| Portugal (AFP) | 90 |
| South Africa Streaming (TOSAC) | 28 |
| Sweden (Sverigetopplistan) | 25 |
| Switzerland (Schweizer Hitparade) | 42 |
| UK Singles (Official Charts) | 1 |
| UK Hip Hop/R&B (Official Charts) | 1 |

=== Year-end charts ===
2022 year-end chart performance for "Starlight"
| Chart (2022) | Position |
|---|---|
| Australia (ARIA) | 69 |
| UK Singles (OCC) | 14 |

== Certifications ==
Certifications for "Starlight"
| Region | Certification | Certified units/sales |
|---|---|---|
| Australia (ARIA) | Platinum | 70,000^{‡} |
| Canada (Music Canada) | 2× Platinum | 160,000^{‡} |
| Denmark (IFPI Danmark) | Platinum | 90,000^{‡} |
| France (SNEP) | Gold | 100,000^{‡} |
| Netherlands (NVPI) | Platinum | 93,000^{‡} |
| New Zealand (RMNZ) | 2× Platinum | 60,000^{‡} |
| Norway (IFPI Norway) | Platinum | 60,000^{‡} |
| South Africa (RISA) | Platinum | 40,000^{‡} |
| Switzerland (IFPI Switzerland) | Gold | 10,000^{‡} |
| United Kingdom (BPI) | 2× Platinum | 1,200,000^{‡} |
Streaming
| Sweden (GLF) | Platinum | 12,000,000^{†} |
^{‡} Sales+streaming figures based on certification alone.^{†} Streaming-only figures based on certification alone.
