= Brit Awards 2022 =

British music awards ceremony

- Date: 8 February 2022
- Venue: The O2 Arena
- Hosted by: Mo Gilligan

Highlights
- Most awards: Adele (3)
- Most nominations: Adele; Ed Sheeran; Dave; Little Simz (4 each)

Television/radio coverage
- Network: ITV; ITV2 (Red Carpet)

Brit Awards 2022, presented by the British Phonographic Industry (BPI), was held on 8 February 2022 to recognise the best in British and international music. The ceremony took place at The O2 Arena in London, and was hosted by British comedian Mo Gilligan. Coverage of the red carpet was broadcast on ITV2 and presented by Clara Amfo and Maya Jama.

The BPI announced in November 2021 that the Brit Awards would no longer use gendered categories, and that it would also revive the categories for best Alternative/Rock Act, Dance Act, Hip Hop/Rap/Grime Act, and Pop/R&B Act. Nominations were announced on 18 December 2021, with Adele, Dave, Ed Sheeran, and Little Simz tied for the most nominations, and the largest number of nominations given to female acts since Brit Awards 2010.

== Performances ==
=== Nominations show ===
Performer(s)	Song	UK Singles Chart reaction (week ending 24 December 2021)	UK Albums Chart reaction (week ending 24 December 2021)
Anne-Marie	"Kiss My (Uh-Oh)"	—N/a	Therapy – 78 (re-entry)
Glass Animals	"Heat Waves"	65 (–12)	—N/a
Mimi Webb	"Good Without"	—N/a	—N/a
Joel Corry Gracey	"Out Out" "Bed" "I Wish"	N/A; N/A; 45 (–9)	—N/a

=== Main show ===
Performer(s)	Song	UK Singles Chart reaction (week ending 17 February 2022)	UK Albums Chart reaction (week ending 17 February 2022)
Ed Sheeran Bring Me the Horizon	"Bad Habits"	20 (+4)	= – 2 (+2) ÷ – 16 (-1) x – 55 (+5); No.6 Collaborations Project – 77 (+4)
Anne-Marie KSI Digital Farm Animals	"Kiss My (Uh-Oh)" "Don't Play" "Holiday"	—N/a	N/A; All Over the Place – 95 (re); N/A
Little Simz Emma Corrin	"Introvert" "Woman"	—N/a	—N/a
Liam Gallagher	"Everything's Electric"	18 (new entry)	—N/a
Holly Humberstone	"London Is Lonely"	—N/a	—N/a
Adele	"I Drink Wine"	75 (-36)	30 – 4 (+1); 25 – 35 (-1); 21 – 61 (+5)
Sam Fender	"Seventeen Going Under"	7 (+1)	Seventeen Going Under – 20 (+12); Hypersonic Missiles – 60 (+23)
Ed Sheeran	"The Joker and the Queen"	—N/a	= – 2 (+2) ÷ – 16 (-1) x – 55 (+5); No.6 Collaborations Project – 77 (+4)
Dave Fredo Ghetts Meekz Giggs	"In the Fire"	—N/a	Psychodrama – 7 (+60); We're All Alone In This Together – 22 (+11); N/A; N/A; N/A; N/A

== Winners and nominees ==
On 22 November 2021, the BPI announced that it would re-align the categories for the 42nd Brit Awards to be gender-neutral; it was stated that the change was intended to "[recognise] artists solely for their music and work, rather than how they choose to identify or as others may see them, as part of the Brits' commitment to evolving the show to be as inclusive and as relevant as possible." This resulted in the merger of the Female Solo Artist and Male Solo Artist into a new Artist of the Year category, and the merger of International Female Solo Artist and International Male Solo Artist into a revived International Artist of the Year category (originally presented between 1986 and 1993). To compensate for the removal of categories, four genre-based awards—Alternative/Rock Act, Dance Act, Hip Hop/Rap/Grime Act, and Pop/R&B Act—were reinstated. These awards were voted on via TikTok.

Nominees for the Rising Star Award were announced on 30 November 2021 and the winner was announced on 9 December 2021. The nominees for the other categories were announced on 18 December 2021 during a televised special, The Brits Are Coming, which was hosted by Maya Jama and Clara Amfo.

British Album of the Year (presented by Idris Elba)	British Artist of the Year (presented by Mo Farah)
Adele – 30; Dave – We're All Alone in This Together; Ed Sheeran – =; Little Simz – Sometimes I Might Be Introvert; Sam Fender – Seventeen Going Under	Adele; Dave; Ed Sheeran; Little Simz; Sam Fender
British Group of the Year (presented by Måneskin)	British Song of the Year (presented by Brett Goldstein and Hannah Waddingham)
Wolf Alice; Coldplay; D-Block Europe; Little Mix; London Grammar	Adele – "Easy on Me"; A1 x J1 – "Latest Trends"; Anne-Marie, KSI & Digital Farm Animals – "Don't Play"; Becky Hill & David Guetta – "Remember"; Central Cee – "Obsessed with You"; Dave featuring Stormzy – "Clash"; Ed Sheeran – "Bad Habits"; Elton John & Dua Lipa – "Cold Heart"; Glass Animals – "Heat Waves"; Joel Corry, Raye & David Guetta – "Bed"; KSI – "Holiday"; Nathan Evans, 220 Kid & Billen Ted – "Wellerman (220 Kid x Billen Ted remix)"; Riton x Nightcrawlers featuring Mufasa & Hypeman – "Friday"; Tion Wayne & Russ Millions – "Body"; Tom Grennan – "Little Bit of Love"
Best Pop/R&B Act (presented by Jaime Winstone and Lando Norris)	Best Dance Act (presented by David Guetta and Pete Tong)
Dua Lipa; Adele; Ed Sheeran; Griff; Joy Crookes	Becky Hill; Calvin Harris; Fred Again; Joel Corry; Raye
Best New Artist (presented by Celeste and Tom Daley)	Best Rock/Alternative Act (presented by Ronnie Wood)
Little Simz; Central Cee; Griff; Joy Crookes; Self Esteem	Sam Fender; Coldplay; Glass Animals; Tom Grennan; Wolf Alice
Best Hip Hop/Rap/Grime Act (presented by Bukayo Saka and Ian Wright)	International Artist of the Year (presented by Jodie Whittaker and Vicky McClure)
Dave; AJ Tracey; Central Cee; Ghetts; Little Simz	Billie Eilish; Doja Cat; Lil Nas X; Olivia Rodrigo; Taylor Swift
International Group of the Year (presented by Clara Amfo)	Best International Song (presented by Courteney Cox and Johnny McDaid)
Silk Sonic; ABBA; BTS; Måneskin; The War on Drugs	Olivia Rodrigo – "Good 4 U"; ATB, Topic & A7S – "Your Love (9PM)"; Billie Eilish – "Happier Than Ever"; CKay featuring Joeboy and Kuami Eugene – "Love Nwantiti Remix (Ah Ah Ah)"; Doja Cat featuring SZA – "Kiss Me More"; Drake featuring Lil Baby – "Girls Want Girls"; Galantis, David Guetta & Little Mix – "Heartbreak Anthem"; Jonasu – "Black Magic"; The Kid Laroi & Justin Bieber – "Stay"; Lil Nas X – "Montero (Call Me by Your Name)"; Lil Tjay & 6lack – "Calling My Phone"; Måneskin – "I Wanna Be Your Slave"; Polo G – "Rapstar"; Tiësto – "The Business"; The Weeknd – "Save Your Tears"
Rising Star (presented by Griff)	British Producer of the Year
Holly Humberstone; Bree Runway; Lola Young	Inflo
Songwriter of the Year (presented by Brian Cox)	
Ed Sheeran	
