= Samantha (Dave and J Hus song) =

2017 song by Dave and J Hus

Single by Dave and J Hus
- Released: 26 January 2017
- Length: 3:40
- Label: Dave
- Songwriters: David Omoregie; Momodou Jallow
- Producer: Jae5

Dave singles chronology
| "Wanna Know" (2016) | "Samantha" (2017) | "Revenge" (2017) |

J Hus singles chronology
| "Playing Sports" (2016) | "Samantha" (2017) | "High Roller" (2017) |

"Samantha" is a song recorded by British rappers Dave and J Hus. The song was written by Dave and J Hus, and produced by Jae5.

Commercially, the song reached number 63 in the United Kingdom. In October 2026, it was certified double platinum by the British Phonographic Industry for exceeding chart sales of 1,200,000.

== Charts ==
| Chart (2017) | Peak position |
|---|---|
| UK Singles (Official Charts) | 63 |
| UK Indie (Official Charts) | 3 |
| UK Hip Hop/R&B (Official Charts) | 7 |

== Certifications ==
| Region | Certification | Certified units/sales |
|---|---|---|
| United Kingdom (BPI) | 2× Platinum | 1,200,000^{‡} |
^{‡} Sales+streaming figures based on certification alone.
