= Game Over (EP) =

EP by Dave
- Released: 3 November 2017
- Genre: British hip hop
- Length: 36:49
- Label: Self-released
- Producer: Dave; 169; Kyle Evans; Fraser T Smith; Sevaqk; Steel Banglez

Dave chronology
Six Paths (2016)	Game Over (2017)	Psychodrama (2019)

Singles from Game Over
- 1. "Question Time" Released: 9 October 2017; 2. "No Words" Released: 3 November 2017

Game Over is the second extended play by British rapper Dave. It was released on 3 November 2017 independently for streaming and digital download. The EP includes 7 tracks with production from Fraser T Smith, 169 and Steel Banglez, alongside a guest appearance from MoStack. It succeeds Dave's debut EP, Six Paths (2016).

Game Over debuted at number thirteen on the UK Albums Chart. The EP was supported by two singles: "Question Time" and "No Words" featuring MoStack, the latter of which peaked at number 17 on the UK Singles Chart.

== Background ==
On 9 October 2017, Dave announced his second extended play, Game Over, alongside the announcement of its accompanying tour.

== Promotion ==
Throughout 2017, Dave released numerous non-album singles that preceded the release of Game Over – "Samantha" featuring J Hus on 27 January 2017, "Revenge" on 4 April 2017, "100M's" on 26 May 2017 and "Tequila" on 14 July 2017.

The lead single, "Question Time" was released on 9 October 2017 alongside its music video and the pre-order for the EP. The politically-charged song comments on Brexit, the Grenfell Tower disaster and NHS budget cuts.

A day before the EP's release, the music video for the second single "No Words" featuring MoStack was uploaded to YouTube.

== Critical reception ==
Professional ratings
Review scores
Source	Rating
Clash	8/10

Game Over received positive reviews from critics. Writing for Clash, Nikita Rathod wrote that the EP "is deep, dark and not for those with a short attention span". She continued to write that "there’s a heaviness to this EP through its depth that makes it clear that there’s really no-one like Dave in UK rap at the moment" and that "there’s no doubt that this EP reveals the various burdens that Dave feels on his shoulders". Rathod stated that "from this EP it’s clear that Dave is sitting in a phase of his career where he’s on the brink of being huge" and that "the project is a profound insight into him being pulled in several directions". Concluding her review, she wrote that "Dave proves he’s not completely convinced by the glitz and glam of music, but is more interested in the fulfilment from the art and making his friends and family proud" and that "what’s more exciting is that we know that the best from Dave hasn’t even arrived yet".

=== Accolades ===
Accolades for Game Over
Publication	Accolade	Rank	Ref.
Complex UK	Complex UK’s Best Albums Of 2017	8	
Vice	The 100 Best Albums of 2017	49	

== Track listing ==
Game Over
No.	Title	Writer(s)	Producer(s)	Length
1.	"Game Over"	David Omoregie; Fraser Thorneycroft-Smith; Tyrell Paul	Fraser T Smith; 169^{[b]}	3:38
2.	"Question Time"	Omoregie	Fraser T Smith; 169^{[b]}	7:07
3.	"Attitude"	Omoregie · Kyle Evans	Dave · Kyle Evans	3:16
4.	"Calling Me Out"	Omoregie; Gursevak Singh Kalsi	Sevaqk	2:55
5.	"How I Met My Ex"	Omoregie	Dave	7:25
6.	"No Words" (featuring MoStack)	Omoregie; Montell Daley; Pahuldip Singh Sandhu; Thorneycroft-Smith; Paul	Steel Banglez; Dave^{[b]}; 169^{[a]}; Fraser T Smith^{[a]}	3:30
7.	"My 19th Birthday"	Omoregie; Paul	169	8:58
Total length:				36:49

Notes

- ^{^[a]} signifies an additional producer.
- ^{^[b]} signifies a co-producer.

== Charts ==
Chart (2017)	Peak position
UK Albums (OCC)	13

== Certifications ==
Region	Certification	Certified units/sales
United Kingdom (BPI)	Gold	100,000^{‡}
^{‡} Sales+streaming figures based on certification alone.
