= Thiago Silva (song) =

Single by Dave and AJ Tracey
- Released: 13 May 2016
- Genre: Grime
- Length: 3:21
- Label: Self-released
- Songwriter(s): David Omoregie; Ché Grant
- Producer(s): 169

Dave singles chronology
"JKYL+HYD" (2016)	"Thiago Silva" (2016)	"Wanna Know" (2016)

AJ Tracey singles chronology
"Packages" (2016)	"Thiago Silva" (2016)	"Leave Me Alone" (2016)

"Thiago Silva" is a song by British rappers Dave and AJ Tracey, released as a single on 13 May 2016. The song is produced by 169 and samples Ruff Sqwad's "Pied Piper". The song title refers to Brazilian footballer Thiago Silva. Complex magazine ranked the song at number 10 on their list of "Grime's Most Impactful Songs of the 2010s".

== Usage in media ==
A clip of Dave inviting a fan, Alex, on-stage during a performance of the track at Glastonbury Festival 2019 went viral in July 2019.

== Commercial performance ==
In March 2020, the track was certified as Platinum by the British Phonographic Industry for exceeding chart sales of 600,000, followed by double Platinum in 2023.

After the viral performance at Glastonbury Festival 2019, "Thiago Silva" entered the UK Singles Chart at number 57 before reaching a peak of number 36.

== Charts ==
Chart (2019)	Peak position
Ireland (IRMA)	38
UK Singles (OCC)	36
UK Indie (OCC)	1
UK Hip Hop/R&B (OCC)	7

== Certifications ==
Region	Certification	Certified units/sales
Denmark (IFPI Danmark)	Gold	45,000^{‡}
New Zealand (RMNZ)	Platinum	30,000^{‡}
United Kingdom (BPI)	2× Platinum	1,200,000^{‡}
^{‡} Sales+streaming figures based on certification alone.
