= Meridian (Dave and Tiakola song) =

Single by Dave and Tiakola
- Released: 24 August 2023
- Length: 4:16
- Label: Neighbourhood
- Songwriters: David Omoregie; William Mundala
- Producers: Jo Caleb; Kyle Evans

Dave singles chronology
"Sprinter" (2023)	"Meridian" (2023)	"Special" (2023)

Tiakola singles chronology
"Meuda" (2022)	"Meridian" (2023)	"Special" (2023)

Music video
- "Meridian" on YouTube

"Meridian" is a song by British rapper Dave and French rapper Tiakola. It was released on 24 August 2023, through Neighbourhood Recordings. The song was written by Dave and Tiakola and produced by Jo Caleb and Jyle Evans. It debuted at number one in the French Singles Chart and at number forty-one in the UK Singles Chart.

== Composition ==
The song pays "lip service to Big H and the North London grime crew of the same name". Dave delivers a rap verse nearing the end of the track while proving his versatility in a melodic state at the start. The track sees to be "demonstrating [Dave's] ability to seamlessly blend genres" and "despite the language barrier, [Tiakola's] contribution harmoniously merges with Santan’s style". The artists mix in English and French in each of their parts while also adding Pidgin into it.

== Music video ==
The official music video was filmed in several locations such as Paris, London and New York.

== Charts ==
Weekly chart performance for "Meridian"
Chart (2023)	Peak position
Belgium (Ultratop 50 Wallonia)	7
France (SNEP)	1
Ireland (IRMA)	62
New Zealand Hot Singles (RMNZ)	23
Switzerland (Schweizer Hitparade)	10
UK Singles (Official Charts)	41
UK Hip Hop/R&B (Official Charts)	18

== Certifications ==
Certifications for "Meridian"
Region	Certification	Certified units/sales
Belgium (BRMA)	Gold	20,000^{‡}
France (SNEP)	Diamond	333,333^{‡}
^{‡} Sales+streaming figures based on certification alone.
