= Dave (rapper) =

English rapper (born 1998)

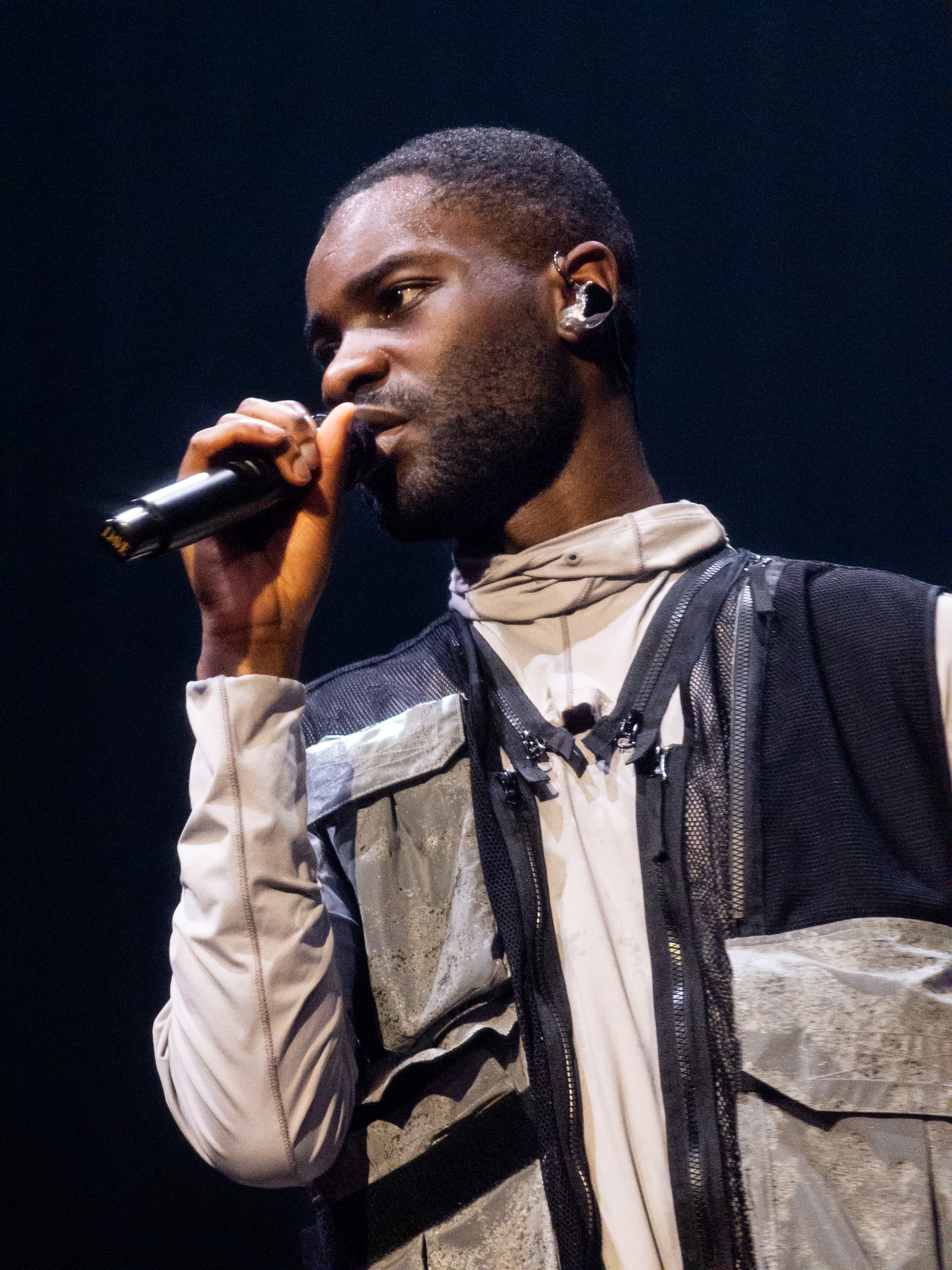
- Dave performing in Brussels in 2026

Background information
- Also known as: Santan Dave; Santan
- Born: David Orobosa Michael Omoregie; 5 June 1998 (age 28); London, England
- Genres: Hip hop; spoken word; conscious hip hop; UK drill
- Occupations: Rapper; singer; songwriter; record producer; actor
- Instruments: Vocals; guitar; piano
- Works: Dave discography
- Years active: 2015–present
- Labels: Neighbourhood; UMG
- Website: santandave.com

David Orobosa Michael Omoregie (born 5 June 1998), known professionally as Dave or Santan Dave, is an English rapper. He is known for his socially conscious lyricism and wordplay. Dave released his debut extended play Six Paths in 2016, after the release of several successful singles, including the grime song "Thiago Silva" (with AJ Tracey). That same year, Canadian rapper Drake premiered a remix of Dave's song "Wanna Know" on the former's OVO Sound Radio. Dave released his second EP Game Over in 2017. In 2018, his political song "Question Time", which directed criticism towards the British government, won the Ivor Novello Award for Best Contemporary Song. Released that same year, his single "Funky Friday" (featuring Fredo), became his first number-one song on the UK singles chart and received triple platinum certification by the British Phonographic Industry (BPI).

Dave's debut studio album, Psychodrama (2019), was met with widespread critical acclaim and debuted atop the UK Albums Chart, having the biggest first-week streams for a UK rap album thus far. It won the Mercury Prize, as well as Album of the Year at the 2020 Brit Awards. His second album, We're All Alone in This Together (2021), was met with continued critical success and became his second UK number-one album. His 2022 single, "Starlight", became his second song to top the UK singles chart, and first to do so as a solo artist. His 2023 single, "Sprinter" (with Central Cee), was his third and longest-running number-one song and served as lead single for their collaborative EP, Split Decision (2023). This was later followed by his third studio album The Boy Who Played the Harp (2025), which received further critical acclaim and likewise topped the chart. The album's only single, "Raindance" (featuring Tems), became Dave's fourth single to top the UK singles chart, and his first to reach the Billboard Hot 100, debuting at number 89 in February 2026.

Dave's accolades consist of 2 Brit Awards from 16 nominations, 4 Ivor Novello Awards, 1 Mercury Prize, and 1 MTV Europe Music Award. He is the first and only UK rap artist to debut three albums at number one on the UK albums chart and simultaneously have three in the top forty of the chart. He also has the most number-one singles in the UK Singles Chart in the 2020s while having the most chart-topping singles for a UK rapper, tied with Dizzie Rascal. Several hip-hop publications have labelled Dave as one of the best UK rappers in history. Outside of music, he made his acting debut in the third season of the Netflix series Top Boy, which premiered in September 2019 and has modelled for Louis Vuitton at the 2023 Paris Fashion Week.

== Early life and personal life ==
David Orobosa Omoregie was born on 5 June 1998, in the Streatham area of South London, His father, Frank Omoregie, is a pastor and his mother, Juliet Doris Omoregie, a nurse. He has two older brothers, Benjamin and Christopher, who are eight and five years older than him, respectively. Dave's father was deported to Nigeria when Dave was just a few months old due to visa issues; he had believed he was travelling on a missionary visa but was actually on a visitor's visa. Dave's mother fled with his brothers in fear of being deported, and was not reunited with Dave until three months later. The family was then left homeless for a period and lived on South London's buses.

Dave moved to Streatham, South London, from nearby Brixton at the age of seven. He began composing music at an early age; he started writing lyrics at 11 after watching his older brother practise rapping at home and he taught himself piano after receiving an electric keyboard from his mother for Christmas when he was 14. Both of Dave's older brothers were in prison throughout his teenage years. When Dave was 11, his brother Christopher was sentenced to life imprisonment with a minimum of 18 years, under the law of joint enterprise, for his involvement in the March 2010 gang murder of 15-year-old Sofyen Belamouadden at London Victoria station. Then, in 2014, when Dave was 15, his other brother Benjamin went to prison for four years for robbery. He was released in 2018.

Dave attended St Mark's Academy in Mitcham, and Richmond upon Thames College in Twickenham, where he studied law, philosophy and ethics, while also completing an additional module in sound design and politics. He secured a place at De Montfort University in Leicester to study law but never attended, choosing instead to focus on his musical career.

Despite being born and raised in London, Dave is an avid supporter of Manchester United.

== Career ==
=== 2015–2018: Career beginnings and Game Over ===
Dave began writing lyrics at the age of 11, inspired by his older brother, who also wrote. In his early teens, he'd teach himself how to play the piano, using YouTube tutorials and learning music theory, before being gifted a keyboard from his mother. In May 2015, when Dave was 17 years-old, he made his rapping debut, feestyling on the six season and twenty-fourth episode of Bl@ckBox, over the instrumental of "No Apologies" by Eminem. He'd continue to appear on cyphers and freestyles until releasing his first song, "Jkyl+Hyd" in 2016. Shortly after, Dave released the single "Thiago Silva" with West-London rapper, AJ Tracey; the song becoming a cult classic. In September 2016, Dave released his debut EP, Six Paths which features the AIM Award, Independent Track of the Year nominee, "Wanna Know". The following month, while Dave was in Amsterdam to attend what would become a cancelled Drake concert, he revealed a call from Drake's management team to remix the aforementioned song. When asked about the night, Dave revealed that he wrote the song's chorus when he was 15 years old.

Throughout 2017, Dave released a series of non-album singles. The track "Samantha" with J Hus peaked at 63 on the Official Singles Chart, becoming the third biggest song to not chart in the top 40 in 2017, Dave also released the tracks "Revenge", "Tequila", and "100M's", the latter of which featured on Nike's Born Mercurial advert in 2018. Dave made his television debut in May on the BBC's Later... with Jools Holland where he performed his song ‘Picture Me’ alongside playing the piano.

Dave toured throughout the first half of 2017, with multiple sold-out headline shows in the UK. These dates included two nights at O2 Academy Islington, and his first appearances at festivals such as Wireless and Reading and Leeds Festival. He also toured North America for the first time, on a joint tour with AJ Tracey.

On 9 October 2017, Dave announced his second extended play, Game Over. The EP was preceded by the track "Question Time". During the song Dave hosts his own "Question Time" posing pointed questions directly at the Prime Minister at that time, Theresa May, the former PM, David Cameron, and the then leader of the Labour Party in 2017, Jeremy Corbyn. The EP Game Over was released on 3 November 2017, independently for streaming and digital download alongside the single "No Words". Game Over debuted at number 13 on the UK Albums Chart and 'No Words' debuted at 18 before eventually peaking at 17 on 11 January 2018. Following the release of the EP, Dave toured a sold-out tour in the UK and Australia, the latter of which he was touring for the first time.

Dave won his first MOBO Award for the Best Newcomer Act at the 2017 ceremony on 29 November 2017. He received his first Brit Award nomination for British Breakthrough Act at the 2018 Brit Awards which he lost out to Dua Lipa. Dave also became the youngest ever winner of an Ivor Novello Award at the age of 19, winning Best Contemporary Song for his politically charged track "Question Time" at the 2018 Awards.

Dave put out his first single after the release of his Game Over EP with the track "Hangman" on 27 February 2018. In the autumn, Dave embarked on his first-ever tour of Europe. After a seven-month hiatus, Dave released the self-produced track "Funky Friday", featuring rapper Fredo, on 4 October 2018. The song debuted at number 1 on the UK Singles Chart, being only the third song to do so in 2018. It became the first song by a British rapper to peak at number 1 on the UK Singles Chart as a lead artist since 2015. This feat also meant that Dave secured his first-ever number 1 single, as well as his first Top 10 single.

=== 2019–2020: Psychodrama ===
In January 2019, Dave collaborated with UK rapper Headie One, featuring on the track "18Hunna" which charted at number 6 on the UK Singles Chart. Dave also collaborated again with Fredo, featuring on his track "All I Ever Wanted" off of Fredo's album Third Avenue.

Dave announced his long-anticipated debut album Psychodrama on 21 February 2019. Alongside the announcement he released the lead single "Black", which discusses what it means to be black in its complexities; his pride and celebration of being black alongside the challenges that black people face. The video for the song included many prominent black British figures with Damson Idris, Dr Anne-Marie Imafidon, Dina Asher-Smith, Ozwald Boateng, Raheem Sterling, Stormzy, Micheal Ward and Tiffany Calver all appearing.

His debut album Psychodrama was released on 8 March 2019. The album debuted at number 1 in the UK, selling 26,390 copies in its first week, with 79% of its total generated by 26.3 million streams. This gave it the biggest first-week streams for a British rap album, eclipsing Stormzy's Gang Signs & Prayer. Elsewhere, the songs "Disaster", "Streatham", and "Location" debuted at 8, 9, and 11, respectively on the UK Singles Chart. Psychodrama is currently one of the top 100 highest-rated hip-hop albums on Metacritic.

In April 2019, "Paper Cuts" which was described as drill style, was previewed on Instagram.

The tracks "Disaster", featuring J Hus, and "Location", featuring Burna Boy, both produced by Jae5, alongside Fraser T. Smith and Dave, were officially released as singles off the album in July 2019. Both tracks went platinum with "Location" becoming one of Dave's biggest tracks to date, having been BPI certified 4× platinum with 1,800,000 units sold by October 2021.

Following the release of the album, Dave embarked on his first UK headline tour since 2017, which included two nights at Brixton Academy. He also went on to tour Australia, Europe, and North America.

On 30 June 2019, Dave made his Glastonbury Festival debut. During the performance he brought a fan onstage to perform his song "Thiago Silva" alongside him, which the video of subsequently went viral. Following this the track entered the UK Singles Chart at number 57 and reached a peak of number 36. Dave also performed for the first time at Reading and Leeds Festival headlining the BBC Radio 1 Stage.

Dave made his acting debut in Netflix's revival and third series of Top Boy, playing the character Modie. He released two tracks, "Professor X" and "God's Eye", for the soundtrack, which were both self-produced.

On 19 September 2019, Dave won the 2019 Mercury Prize for his debut album Psychodrama. Dave also won British Album of the Year at the 2020 Brit Awards. This made him only the second artist ever to win both of these awards for the same album. Dave's performance of the track "Black" at the Brit Awards led to controversy, after he called the then UK Prime Minister Boris Johnson a "real racist" and called out the government over their treatment of the victims of Grenfell Tower and the Windrush generation. The track won Dave another Ivor Novello Award for Best Contemporary Song at the 2020 awards. He also won the GQ Men of the Year Vero Breakthrough Music Act Award at 2019 GQ Men of the Year Awards.

In August 2020, Dave collaborated with Sir David Attenborough for a special episode of Planet Earth entitled Planet Earth: A Celebration, with Dave playing the piano alongside famous composer Hans Zimmer. In October 2020, Dave collaborated with Fraser T. Smith in the production of Smith's debut album, 12 Questions.

=== 2021–2023: We're All Alone in This Together and Split Decision ===
In January 2021, Dave worked again with frequent collaborator Fredo. Dave featured on and produced, Fredo's track "Money Talks" which debuted at number 3 on the UK Singles Chart. The song was a single off Fredo's album Money Can't Buy Happiness which Dave executively produced under the name SANTAN.

In April 2021, Dave released two songs as a two-track EP, "Titanium", and "Mercury", featuring Kamal, labelled as leftovers from his second album. Two months later, Dave announced his second album, We're All Alone in This Together, alongside its cover art and release date. On 9 July the lead single, "Clash" featuring Stormzy, was released, which peaked at number 2 on the UK Singles Chart. The music video features Dave and Stormzy surrounded by cars at the Aston Martin factory in Warwickshire and driving round the Silverstone Circuit. This came after Dave had collaborated with Aston Martin in March 2021, for the launch of their AMR21 Formula 1 car.

On 23 July 2021, Dave released his second album, We're All Alone in This Together. It debuted at number 1 on the UK Albums Chart, becoming Dave's second consecutive number 1 album. It was also Dave's first number 1 album on the Scottish Albums Chart and the Irish Albums Chart. We're All Alone in This Together sold 74,000 album-equivalent units in its first week, with 43.9% of its total coming from the 38.5 million streams across the 12 tracks, a new record in terms of weekly album streams for a UK rap act. On the UK Singles Chart the tracks "Clash", "Verdansk", and "In the Fire" reached numbers 2, 4, and 6, respectively. UK chart rules prevent artists from having more than three songs in the top 40 at once, otherwise data showed that all 12 album tracks would have entered the Top 20. These first week sales broke multiple records, making it the biggest opening week of an album in the UK since November 2019 with Coldplay's album Everyday Life and the biggest first week sales for a UK hip hop/rap album in the last decade, since Tinie Tempah's debut Disc-Overy in October 2010. The album returned to number 1 on 13 August 2021, three weeks after its release. After the release, Dave headlined his first festival at Parklife on 11 September.

In August 2021, Dave won his third Ivor Novello Award alongside Fraser T Smith in the Best Contemporary Song category for the track "Children of the Internet". Dave continued to produce for other artists, producing the track "End of the Beginning" on Central Cee's mixtape 23, again under the name SANTAN, which was released in February 2022.

Dave was nominated for four awards at the 2022 Brit Awards, including best album, best artist and best song. He won the award for Best British Hip Hop/Rap/Grime Act. He performed his track "In the Fire" at the ceremony, bringing onstage the track's featured guests – Fredo, Meekz, Ghetts and Giggs – and performing a solo on the guitar, which he had only been learning for four months prior.

He embarked on his first sold-out UK arena tour in early 2022, which included two shows at the O2 arena. Dave then carried on his tour to Europe and North America. In March 2022, he released his first single of the year, "Starlight". It debuted at number 1 on the UK Singles chart as the biggest single debut of the year, making it Dave's second chart-topping single and his 11th top 10 single. The song broke a number of records. It became the first UK number 1 of the 2020s to be entirely written and performed by one person and the first number 1 to be written and produced by just one person since 2014. It also became the longest-running number 1 solo UK Rap single in Official Charts history.

Dave won Songwriter of the Year at the 67th Ivor Novello Awards in May, making that his fourth Ivor Novello win in five years.

Dave performed at a number of festivals over the summer including headlining Wireless Festival, Longitude Festival, Rolling Loud Toronto and becoming the youngest ever solo headliner of Reading and Leeds Festival.

In June 2023, Dave released the single "Sprinter" with Central Cee. The track debuted with 108,200 chart units in its first tracking week alongside 13.4 million streams, the greatest week of streams for a rap single in UK history, as well as the most-streamed UK hip-hop song in a single day. It is also the first ever UK rap song to surpass 1 billion streams on Spotify. The track reached number 1 on the UK singles charts, making it Dave's third number 1 single after "Funky Friday" and "Starlight", as well as Central Cee's first number 1 single. "Sprinter" was later followed by the collaborative EP, Split Decision, a few days later. In August of the same year, Dave collaborated with French rapper and singer, Tiakola to release their collaborative singles, "Meridian" and "Special", the former peaking atop the French Singles Chart, marking both Dave and Tiakola's first chart-topper on the chart. In December, Dave appeared alongside American rapper and singer, Jack Harlow as a guest appearance on "Stop Giving Me Advice", the fourth single of Lyrical Lemonade's debut album, All Is Yellow.

=== 2024–present: The Boy Who Played the Harp ===
After a year-long hiatus, in January 2025, Dave appeared as a guest on "CRG", the eighth cut of Central Cee's debut album, Can't Rush Greatness. The track debuted at No. 6 on the UK Singles Chart, marking Dave's thirteenth top ten single. After almost one and a half years of not releasing music as a lead artist, in May 2025, Dave posted on Instagram to celebrate the 10th anniversary of his breakout "Blackbox Cypher" freestyle, concluding with an announcement that he was "just finishing this [his third] album", hinting at a 2025 release.

On 1 October, Dave announced his third full-length studio album, The Boy Who Played the Harp. It was released on 24 October 2025, with no prior singles. The record debuted atop the UK albums chart, moving approximately 74,000 units in its first week, becoming the fastest-selling rap album on vinyl in the 21st century, selling 15,500 copies in its first week. Dave also became the first UK rapper to debut three albums at No. 1 and the first to land three albums inside the UK Albums Chart Top 40 with The Boy Who Played the Harp at No. 1, Psychodrama at No. 17, and We're All Alone in This Together at No. 26. The album spawned two top-ten hits: "Raindance" (5), moving 34,935 single units and "History" (9), moving 25,119 single units, and a top-twenty hit, "Chapter 16" (11), moving 22,415 single units in its first week. Dave is scheduled to embark on his The Boy Who Played the Harp Tour, commencing on 2 February 2026, in Munich, and concluding on 30 August in Leeds. The tour will cover the UK, Europe, North America, Australia, and Africa; Dave will also headline both the Reading and Leeds Festivals for the final two nights of the tour. During the chart week ending 29 January 2026, "Raindance" climbed to number one on the UK Singles Chart, moving 50,474 units in its tracking week.

On September 5, Dave made a guest appearance at the Tottenham Hotspur Stadium on the fifth night of Jay-Z's Jay-Z 30 Tour, performing "Raindance".

== Artistry ==
=== Influences ===
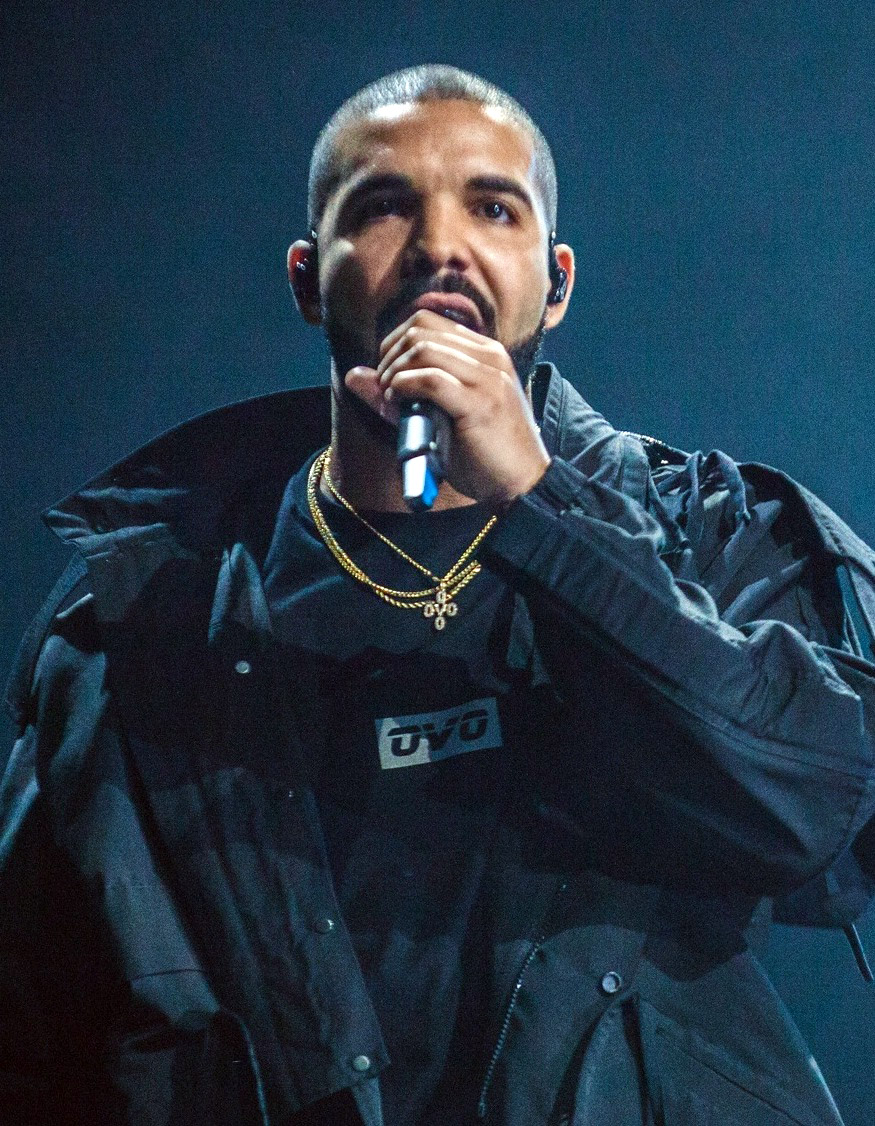
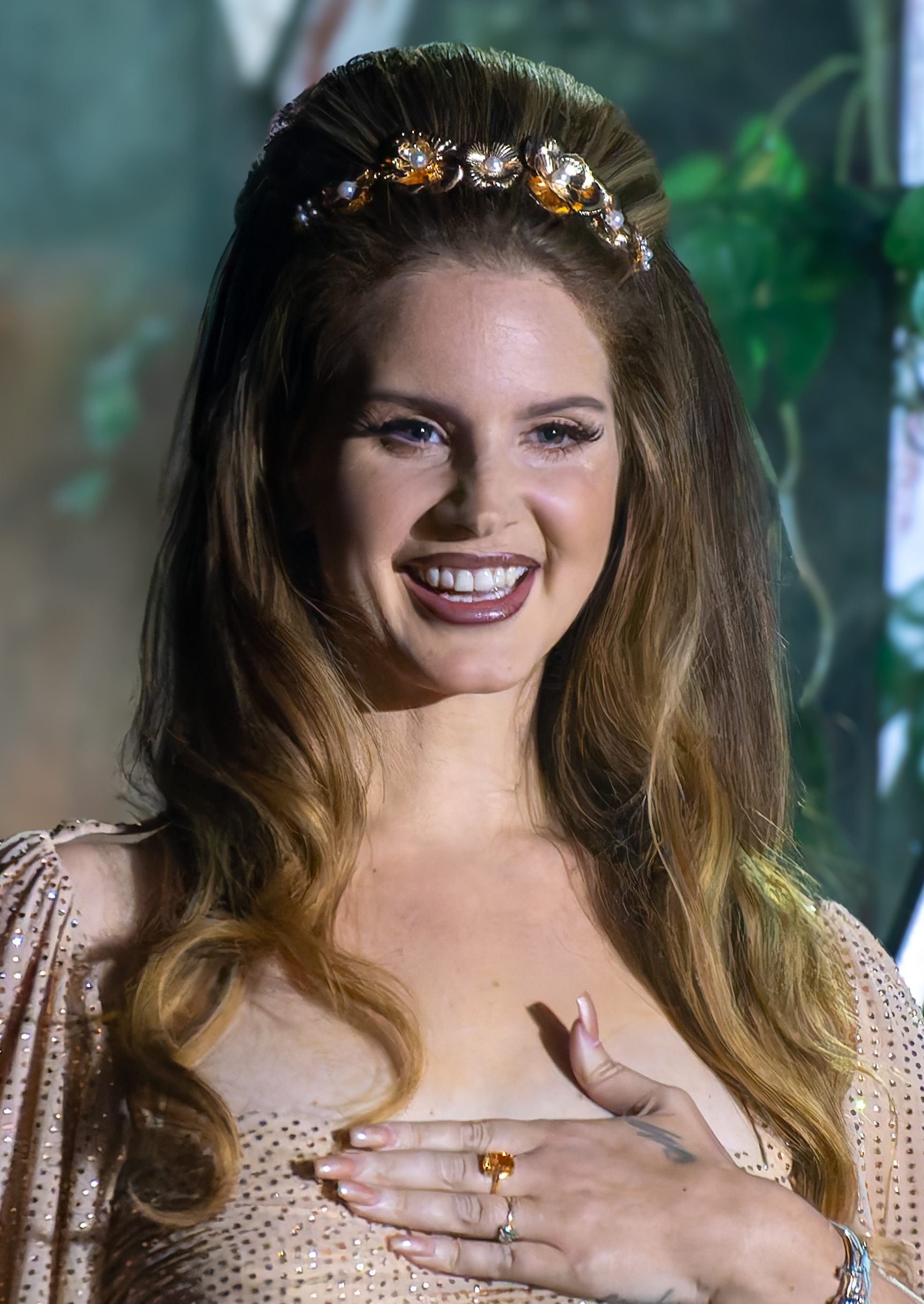
Dave has credited Drake (left) and Lana Del Rey (right) as being his biggest musical influences

Dave has cited several artists for influencing both his rapping and production style, including Drake, Hans Zimmer, Kendrick Lamar, and Lana Del Rey, while he revealed that while growing up, he related to artists such as Devlin, Drake, J. Cole, Kendrick Lamar, and Kano. In an interview with GQ, it was revealed that Dave would study Zimmer's work while in his teenage years. Alongside rapping, Dave also produces, plays piano, and plays guitar.

=== Musical style ===
Omoregie is considered to be a conscious hip hop artist and is often praised for his "lyrical prowess" and wordplay. The Guardian's Alexis Petridis wrote that Dave's "lyrics are smart, thoughtful, unflinching and self-aware", while The Times' Jonathan Dean described Dave as "one of the most gifted lyricists who talks for his generation". Dean continued that Dave's music is a "blend of American artists", comparing him to Stormzy and Linton Kwesi Johnson, "for the way he chronicles black British life".

Dave's musical creativity stems from his own lived experiences. Throughout his music, he covers topics of racism, misogyny, domestic abuse, and will often speak about politics in his music. Dave has been noted by music critics for his lyricism, with GQ writing that they "oscillate between the personal and the political with compelling emotional candour", while he's also praised for his "intricately rehearsed ability to relay it to an audience". Throughout his career, Dave has experimented in several different genres, including afrobeats with "Location", UK drill with "Clash", and grime with "Thiago Silva".

== Philanthropy ==
On 6 September 2020, Dave appeared as a celebrity at Soccer Aid for the Soccer Aid World XI in a charity football match to raise money for GAVI.

Following the start of the Gaza war in October 2023, the conflict in the Democratic Republic of the Congo, and the continued War in Sudan, Dave had taken to social media to promote the sale of his clothing brand, "Psycho" to raise almost £500,000 to donate to Palestine, Congo, and Sudan. Alongside raising money for the conflicts around the world, Dave released a track titled, "Peace Dream" in which he raps about the conflicts while pointing out hypocrisy in the government. Upon the release of "Peace Dream", Dave had taken to Twitter to speak on the conflict.

We raised close to £500,000 factoring everything in last Sunday for the charities in Palestine Congo and Sudan. Massive love to all. Thanks for playing a part and allowing me to play my part also. Will keep you updated on the journey the donations take to those in need.

On 27 February 2023, Dave, alongside his mother, Juliet-Doris Omoregie, founded the Juliet O Foundation. This charity aids the NHS, as his mother has worked for the NHS for over 35 years. The charity provides elderly patients with everyday essentials after being discharged from the hospital; the first hospital involved with the programme was St George's Hospital in Tooting. By 2025, alongside St. Georges Hospital, the Epsom and St Helier University Hospitals NHS Trust partnered with the charity to continue giving out the essentials upon discharge. According to the charity, "the packs were developed to reduce hospital readmissions and include items such as soap, toothpaste, tea and coffee, and non-slip socks to prevent falls". When interviewed by the BBC, Juliet stated that when she worked for the NHS, she noticed that, "most of [her] elderly patients were really stressed when they were going home because they didn't have the basic essentials they needed", which was the primary motivation for founding the charity. In October of the same year, it was announced that the charity would begin to support the Ashford and St Peter's Hospitals NHS Foundation Trust.

== Other activities ==
=== Modelling ===
Dave made his modelling debut for Pharrell Williams' Louis Vuitton debut as the newly appointed men's creative director at the 2023 Paris Fashion Week.

=== Baller League UK ===
In March 2025, it was revealed that Dave would be managing Santan FC, one of the 12 teams in Baller League UK, a six-a-side football league broadcast on Sky Sports. The team won its first match on 24 March 2025, defeating Trebol FC by 6–4.

== Discography ==
Studio Albums

- Psychodrama (2019)
- We're All Alone in This Together (2021)
- The Boy Who Played the Harp (2025)

EPs

- Six Paths (2016)
- Game Over (2017)
- Split Decision (with Central Cee) (2023)

== Tours ==
=== Headlining ===
- Game Over Tour (2017)
- Psychodrama Tour (2019)
- We're All Alone in This Together Tour (2022)
- The Boy Who Played the Harp Tour (2026)

== Filmography ==
Television
Year	Title	Role	Notes
2019	Top Boy	Morris ‘Modie’ Gregory	Series 3
2025	Baller League UK	Himself	Six-a-side football league

== Awards and nominations ==
Award nominations for Dave
Award	Year	Recipient(s) and nominee(s)	Category	Result	Ref.
AIM Awards	2017	"Wanna Know"	Independent Track of the Year	Nominated	
AIM Awards	2017	Himself	Most Played New Independent Act	Nominated	
AIM Awards	2017	Himself	Independent Breakthrough of the Year	Nominated	
AIM Awards	2018	"Question Time"	Independent Track of the Year	Nominated	
AIM Awards	2018	Himself	Most Played New Independent Act	Won	
AIM Awards	2019	Psychodrama	Best Independent Album	Won	
AIM Awards	2019	"Funky Friday"	Best Independent Track	Won	
BET Awards	2019	Himself	Best International Act	Nominated	
BET Awards	2026	"Raindance"	Viewer's Choice Award	Pending	
Brit Awards	2018	Himself	British Breakthrough Act	Nominated	
Brit Awards	2020	Psychodrama	Album of the Year	Won	
Brit Awards	2020	"Location"	Song of the Year	Nominated	
Brit Awards	2020	Himself	British Male Solo Artist	Nominated	
Brit Awards	2020	Himself	Best New Artist	Nominated	
Brit Awards	2022	We're All Alone in This Together	Album of the Year	Nominated	
Brit Awards	2022	"Clash"	Song of the Year	Nominated	
Brit Awards	2022	Himself	Artist of the Year	Nominated	
Brit Awards	2022	Himself	Best Hip Hop/Grime/Rap Act	Won	
Brit Awards	2023	"Starlight"	Song of the Year	Nominated	
Brit Awards	2024	"Sprinter" (with Central Cee)	Song of the Year	Nominated	
Brit Awards	2024	Himself	Artist of the Year	Nominated	
Brit Awards	2024	Himself	Best Hip Hop/Grime/Rap Act	Nominated	
Brit Awards	2026	The Boy Who Played the Harp	Album of the Year	Nominated	
Brit Awards	2026	Himself	Artist of the Year	Nominated	
Brit Awards	2026	Himself	Best Hip Hop/Grime/Rap Act	Won	
GQ Men of the Year Awards	2019	Himself	Breakthrough Music Act	Won	
Ivor Novello Awards	2018	"Question Time"	Best Contemporary Song	Won	
Ivor Novello Awards	2021	"Children of the Internet"	Best Contemporary Song	Won	
Ivor Novello Awards	2022	Himself	Songwriter of the Year	Won	
Ivor Novello Awards	2024	"Sprinter" (with Central Cee)	PRS for Music Most Performed Work	Won	
Mercury Prize	2019	Psychodrama	Best Album	Won	
MOBO Awards	2017	Himself	Best Newcomer	Won	
MOBO Awards	2021	We're All Alone in This Together	Album of the Year	Won	
MOBO Awards	2021	Himself	Best Male Act	Nominated	
MOBO Awards	2021	Himself	Best Hip-Hop Act	Nominated	
MOBO Awards	2021	"Clash"	Song of the Year	Nominated	
MOBO Awards	2021	"Money Talks"	Video of the Year	Nominated	
MOBO Awards	2022	Himself	Best Male Act	Nominated	
MOBO Awards	2022	"Starlight"	Song of the Year	Nominated	
MOBO Awards	2023	Himself	Best Male Act	Nominated	
MOBO Awards	2023	"Sprinter" (with Central Cee)	Song of the Year	Won	
MOBO Awards	2026	"3x" (with Jim Legxacy)	Song of the Year	Nominated	
MOBO Awards	2026	"3x" (with Jim Legxacy)	Video of the Year	Nominated	
MTV Europe Music Award	2019	Himself	Best UK & Ireland Act	Won	
MTV Europe Music Award	2023	"Sprinter" (with Central Cee)	Best Collaboration	Nominated	
NME Awards	2018	Game Over	Best Mixtape	Nominated	
Q Awards	2019	Himself	Best Solo Act	Nominated	
Q Awards	2019	Psychodrama	Best Album	Nominated	
Rated Awards	2016	Himself	Best Breakthrough	Nominated	
Rated Awards	2017	"Samantha"	Best Track	Nominated	
Rated Awards	2017	Six Paths	Mixtape of the Year	Nominated	
Rated Awards	2018	Himself	Artist of the Year	Nominated	
Rated Awards	2018	"No Words"	Track of the Year	Nominated	
Rated Awards	2018	Game Over	Mixtape of the Year	Nominated	
UK Music Video Awards	2019	"Black"	Best Urban Video – UK	Nominated	
UK Music Video Awards	2019	Himself	Best Artist	Nominated	
