= Funky Friday =

Single by Dave featuring Fredo
- Released: 5 October 2018
- Genre: Hip hop
- Length: 3:03
- Label: Dave; Neighbourhood
- Songwriters: David Omoregie; Marvin Bailey; Fraser T. Smith; Tyrell Paul
- Producers: Dave; 169

Dave singles chronology
"Hangman" (2018)	"Funky Friday" (2018)	"18HUNNA" (2019)

Music video
- "Funky Friday" on YouTube

"Funky Friday" is a song by British rapper Dave featuring fellow British rapper Fredo. The song was self-released as a single on 5 October 2018 for streaming and digital download. Produced by 169 and Dave, it debuted at the top of the UK Singles Chart, becoming both artists' first number one.

== Background ==
The song was first teased by Dave on his Instagram, two days prior to the release of the song. It was released alongside a music video on 4 October 2018, directed by Dave and Nathan James Tettey.

== Chart performance ==
In the midweek chart, "Funky Friday" was reported to enter the UK Singles Chart at number two, a total of 2,000 combined sales behind "Promises" by Calvin Harris and Sam Smith. "Funky Friday" entered the UK Singles Chart at number one for the week dated 12 October 2018, with a combined number of 6.7 million audio and video streams. It became Dave's first number one and top ten single, and Fredo's first top forty entry. It is the first song by a British rapper to peak at number one on the UK Singles Chart as a lead artist since "Not Letting Go" by Tinie Tempah featuring Jess Glynne in 2015.

The song's debut at number one served as a significant moment for British rap music.

== Personnel ==
Credits adapted from Tidal.

- Dave – vocals, production, drums, bass guitar, piano, programming
- Fredo – vocals
- 169 – additional production
- Fraser T. Smith – mixing, master engineering
- Manon Grandjean – mixing, master engineering

== Charts ==
=== Weekly charts ===
Chart (2018–2020)	Peak position
Greece (IFPI)	65
Ireland (IRMA)	21
Scotland Singles (OCC)	42
UK Singles (OCC)	1
UK Hip Hop/R&B (OCC)	1

=== Year-end charts ===
Chart (2019)	Position
UK Singles (Official Charts Company)	78

== Certifications ==
Region	Certification	Certified units/sales
Canada (Music Canada)	Gold	40,000^{‡}
New Zealand (RMNZ)	Gold	15,000^{‡}
United Kingdom (BPI)	3× Platinum	1,800,000^{‡}
^{‡} Sales+streaming figures based on certification alone.
