= Central Cee discography =

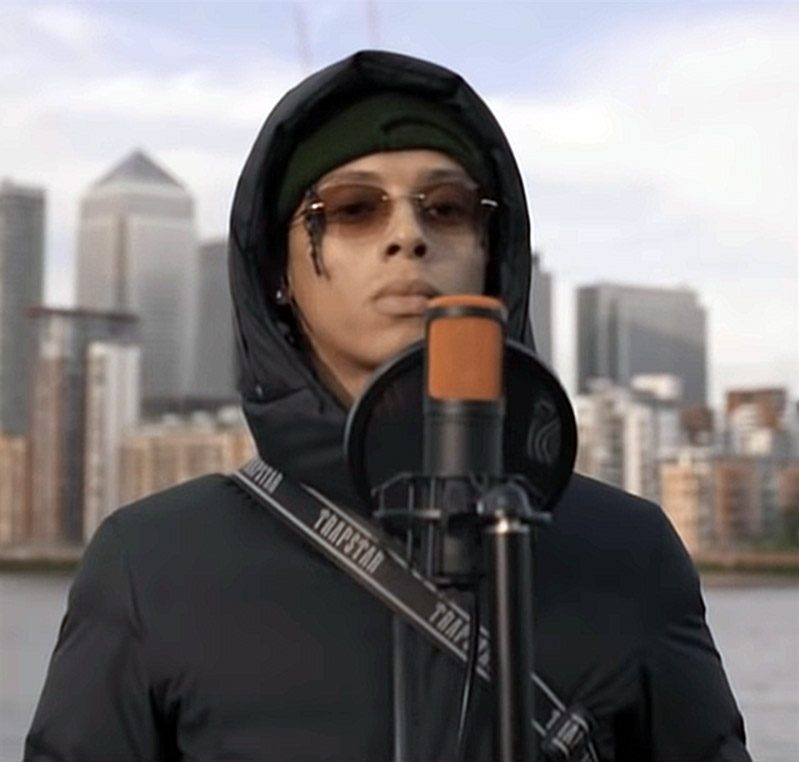
- Central Cee in October 2019 filming his Next Up? with Mixtape Madness
- Studio albums: 1
- EPs: 6
- Singles: 27
- Mixtapes: 2

The discography of British rapper Central Cee consists of one studio album, two mixtapes, six extended plays (EP), and 27 singles (including seven as a featured artist).

== Studio albums ==
Title	Album details	Peak chart positions										Sales (Note: Sales figures for albums, EPs, and singles are pure sales that do not take equivalent units into account.)	Certifications
Title	Album details	UK	AUS	CAN	GER	IRE	ITA	NLD	NZ	SWE	US	Sales	Certifications
Can't Rush Greatness	Released: 24 January 2025; Label: CC4L, Columbia; Format: CD, LP,cassette, digital download, streaming	1	2	2	1	1	14	1	1	5	9	UK: 100,000 (Note: Consisting of 17,930 from first week pure sales in the UK); US: 10,000 (Note: First week pure sales in the US)	BPI: Gold; MC: Gold; NVPI: Gold; RMNZ: Gold

== Mixtapes ==
List of mixtapes, with selected chart positions
Title	Mixtape details	Peak chart positions									Certifications
Title	Mixtape details	UK	AUS	CAN	FRA	GER	IRE	ITA	NLD	NZ	Certifications
Wild West	Released: 12 March 2021; Label: Live Yours, ADA; Format: CD, LP, digital download, streaming	2	37	—	162	—	3	82	42	—	BPI: Gold; SNEP: Gold
23	Released: 25 February 2022; Label: Live Yours, ADA; Format: CD, LP, cassette, digital download, streaming	1	6	32	9	57	3	19	6	14	BPI: Gold; RMNZ: Gold
"—" denotes a recording that did not chart or was not released in that territory.

== Extended plays ==
List of extended plays, with selected chart positions
Title	EP details	Peak chart positions						
Title	EP details	UK	AUS	CAN	DEN	NZ	SWI	US Heat.
Nostalgia	Released: 10 March 2017; Label: Self-released; Format: Digital download, streaming	—	—	—	—	—	—	—
17	Released: 14 June 2017; Label: PLXCE; Format: Digital download, streaming	—	—	—	—	—	—	—
CS, Vol. 1	Released: 1 September 2017; Label: PLXCE; Format: Digital download, streaming	—	—	—	—	—	—	—
No More Leaks	Released: 14 October 2022; Label: Live Yours, ADA; Format: Digital download, streaming	—	—	—	—	—	—	—
Split Decision (with Dave)	Released: 4 June 2023; Label: Live Yours, Neighborhood; Format: Digital download, streaming	—	—	13	24	—	18	6
All Roads Lead Home	Released: 27 March 2026; Label: CC4L, Columbia; Format: Digital download, streaming	34	26	85	—	22	27	—
"—" denotes a recording that did not chart or was not released in that territory.

== Singles ==
=== As lead artist ===
List of singles, with selected chart positions
Title	Year	Peak chart positions										Certifications	Album
Title	Year	UK	UK R&B	AUS	CAN	FRA	IRE	NZ	SWE	US	WW	Certifications	Album
"Molly"	2020	—	—	—	—	—	—	—	—	—	—		Non-album single
"Day in the Life"	2020	44	29	—	—	—	96	—	—	—	—	BPI: Platinum; ARIA: Platinum; GLF: Gold; MC: Gold; SNEP: Gold; RMNZ: Platinum	Wild West
"Loading"	2020	19	8	—	—	—	39	—	— (Note: "Loading" did not enter the Swedish Singellista Chart, but peaked at number 19 on the Swedish Heatseeker Chart.)	—	—	BPI: Platinum; ARIA: Platinum; GLF: Platinum; MC: Platinum; RMNZ: Platinum; SNEP: Gold	Wild West
"Pinging (6 Figures)"	2021	44	25	—	—	—	—	—	—	—	—		Wild West
"Commitment Issues"	2021	9	3	—	—	—	24	— (Note: "Commitment Issues" did not enter the New Zealand Top 40 Singles Chart, but peaked at number 17 on the Hot 40 Singles Chart.)	— (Note: "Commitment Issues" did not enter the Swedish Singellista Chart, but peaked at number 14 on the Swedish Heatseeker Chart.)	—	—	BPI: Platinum; ARIA: Platinum; GLF: Gold; MC: Gold; RMNZ: Gold	Wild West
"6 for 6"	2021	16	8	—	—	—	—	—	—	—	—	BPI: Gold; ARIA: Gold; RMNZ: Gold	Wild West
"The Great Escape" (with Blanco)	2021	62	32	—	—	—	—	—	—	—	—		City of God
"Meant to Be" (with Stay Flee Get Lizzy and Fredo)	2021	17	7	—	—	—	50	—	—	—	—		Stars Alinged
"Little Bit of This"	2021	34	9	—	—	—	94	—	—	—	—	BPI: Silver	Non-album single
"Obsessed with You"	2021	4	1	30	—	45	16	— (Note: "Obsessed With You" did not enter the New Zealand Top 40 Singles Chart, but peaked at number 3 on the Hot 40 Singles Chart.)	70	—	—	BPI: Platinum; ARIA: Platinum; GLF: Gold; MC: Gold; SNEP: Platinum; RMNZ: Platinum	23
"Daily Duppy" (with GRM Daily)	2021	35	12	—	—	—	65	— (Note: "Daily Duppy" did not enter the New Zealand Top 40 Singles Chart, but peaked at number 23 on the Hot 40 Singles Chart.)	—	—	—	BPI: Silver	Non-album single
"Retail Therapy"	2022	21	7	—	—	—	43	— (Note: "Retail Therapy" did not enter the New Zealand Top 40 Singles Chart, but peaked at number 19 on the Hot 40 Singles Chart.)	—	—	—	BPI: Silver	23
"Cold Shoulder"	2022	25	9	—	—	—	45	— (Note: "Cold Shoulder" did not enter the New Zealand Top 40 Singles Chart, but peaked at number 11 on the Hot 40 Singles Chart.)	—	—	—	BPI: Silver	23
"Khabib"	2022	22	9	—	—	—	43	— (Note: "Khabib" did not enter the New Zealand Top 40 Singles Chart, but peaked at number 17 on the Hot 40 Singles Chart.)	—	—	—	BPI: Silver	23
"Doja"	2022	2	1	3	16	7	5	5	1	— (Note: "Doja" did not enter the Billboard Hot 100, but peaked at number 12 on the Bubbling Under Hot 100 chart.)	19	BPI: Platinum; ARIA: 2× Platinum; GLF: Platinum; MC: Platinum; RIAA: Platinum; RMNZ: 2× Platinum; SNEP: Diamond	Non-album singles
"LA Leakers Freestyle"	2022	40	15	—	—	—	78	— (Note: "LA Leakers Freestyle" did not enter the New Zealand Top 40 Singles Chart, but peaked at number 14 on the Hot 40 Singles Chart.)	—	—	—	BPI: Silver	Non-album singles
"One Up"	2022	17	7	92	100	138	27	— (Note: "One Up" did not enter the NZ Top 40 Singles Chart, but peaked at number three on the NZ Hot Singles Chart.)	— (Note: "One Up" did not enter the Swedish Singellista Chart, but peaked at number 11 on the Swedish Heatseeker Chart.)	—	—	BPI: Silver; RMNZ: Gold	No More Leaks
"Let Go"	2022	6	1	11	23	1	8	13	5	—	34	BPI: Platinum; ARIA: Platinum; GLF: Platinum; MC: Platinum; RMNZ: Platinum; SNEP: Diamond	Non-album singles
"Me & You"	2023	31	14	—	—	—	64	— (Note: "Me & You" did not enter the NZ Top 40 Singles Chart, but peaked at number 13 on the NZ Hot Singles Chart.)	—	—	—		Non-album singles
"Sprinter" (with Dave)	2023	1	1	1	5	30	1	1	2	— (Note: "Sprinter" did not enter the Billboard Hot 100, but peaked at number two on the Bubbling Under Hot 100 chart.)	9	BPI: 3× Platinum; ARIA: 3× Platinum; GLF: 2× Platinum; MC: 4× Platinum; RIAA: Platinum; RMNZ: 4× Platinum; SNEP: Platinum	Split Decision
"On the Radar Freestyle" (with Drake)	2023	26	11	89	45	—	42	— (Note: "On the Radar Freestyle" did not enter the NZ Top 40 Singles Chart, but peaked at number nine on the NZ Hot Singles Chart.)	—	80	106		Non-album single
"Too Much" (with the Kid Laroi and Jungkook)	2023	10	—	10	31	126	19	37	60	44	11	MC: Gold; RIAA: Gold	The First Time
"Entrapreneur"	2023	36	6	—	—	58	—	— (Note: "Entrapreneur" did not enter the NZ Top 40 Singles Chart, but peaked at number two on the NZ Hot Singles Chart.)	—	—	—		Non-album singles
"I Will"	2024	18	4	—	—	—	37	— (Note: "I Will" did not enter the NZ Top 40 Singles Chart, but peaked at number six on the NZ Hot Singles Chart.)	— (Note: "I Will" did not enter the Swedish Singellista Chart, but peaked at number four on the Swedish Heatseeker Chart.)	—	—		Non-album singles
"H.Y.B." (with J. Cole and Bas)	2024	29	7	73	34	—	45	36	—	35	47		Might Delete Later
"Band4Band" (with Lil Baby)	2024	3	1	9	11	84	9	12	19	18	12	BPI: Platinum; MC: 3× Platinum; RIAA: Platinum; RMNZ: Platinum; SNEP: Gold	Can't Rush Greatness
"Wave" (with Asake)	2024	41	—	—	—	—	82	— (Note: "Wave" did not enter the NZ Top 40 Singles Chart, but peaked at number 28 on the NZ Hot Singles Chart.)	—	—	—		Lungu Boy
"Did It First" (with Ice Spice)	2024	15	5	22	37	169	20	20	— (Note: "Did It First" did not enter the Swedish Singellista Chart, but peaked at number 20 on the Swedish Heatseeker Chart.)	51	30	BPI: Silver; RMNZ: Gold	Y2K!
"Gen Z Luv"	2024	34	7	—	—	—	60	— (Note: "Gen Z Luv" did not enter the NZ Top 40 Singles Chart, but peaked at number five on the NZ Hot Singles Chart.)	—	—	—		Can't Rush Greatness
"Bolide Noir" (with JRK 19)	2024	—	—	—	—	33	—	— (Note: "Bolide Noir" did not enter the NZ Top 40 Singles Chart, but peaked at number 24 on the NZ Hot Singles Chart.)	—	—	—	SNEP: Gold	Non-album singles
"Moi" (featuring Raye)	2024	38	5	—	—	—	72	— (Note: "Moi" did not enter the NZ Top 40 Singles Chart, but peaked at number eight on the NZ Hot Singles Chart.)	— (Note: "Moi" did not enter the Swedish Singellista Chart, but peaked at number 20 on the Swedish Heatseeker Chart.)	—	—		Non-album singles
"One by One"	2024	69	39	—	—	—	—	— (Note: "One by One" did not enter the NZ Top 40 Singles Chart, but peaked at number 34 on the NZ Hot Singles Chart.)	—	—	—		Non-album singles
"GBP" (with 21 Savage)	2025	6	1	36	28	—	26	20	89	81	43	BPI: Silver; MC: Gold; RMNZ: Gold	Can't Rush Greatness
"Guilt Trippin" (with Sexyy Red)	2025	47	8	86	—	—	—	— (Note: "Guilt Trippin" did not enter the NZ Top 40 Singles Chart, but peaked at number 10 on the NZ Hot Singles Chart.)	—	—	—		Non-album single
"Which One" (with Drake)	2025	4	1	16	4	—	12	18	62	23	14	BPI: Silver; ARIA: Gold; RMNZ: Gold	Maid of Honour
"Booga"	2025	50	4	—	—	—	92	— (Note: "Booga" did not enter the NZ Top 40 Singles Chart, but peaked at number 4 on the Hot 40 Singles Chart.)	—	—	—		Non-album single
"Iceman Freestyle"	2026	37	5	—	84	—	78	— (Note: "Iceman Freestyle" did not enter the NZ Top 40 Singles Chart, but peaked at number 16 on the Hot 40 Singles Chart.)	—	—	—		All Roads Lead Home
"Slaughter" (with J Hus)	2026	54	17	—	—	—	—	— (Note: "Slaughter" did not enter the NZ Top 40 Singles Chart, but peaked at number 23 on the Hot 40 Singles Chart.)	—	—	—		All Roads Lead Home
"The Team"	2026	—	—	—	—	—	—	—	—	—	—		Non-album single
"—" denotes a recording that did not chart or was not released in that territory.

=== As featured artist ===
Title	Year	Peak chart positions						Certifications	Album
Title	Year	UK	AUT	GER	IRE	ITA	SWI	Certifications	Album
"Back2Back" (Kairo Keyz featuring Central Cee)	2019	—	—	—	—	—	—		Non-album singles
"Movie" (Rondodasosa featuring Central Cee and Nko)	2021	—	—	—	—	26	—	FIMI: Gold	Non-album singles
"Measure of a Man" (FKA Twigs featuring Central Cee)	2021	—	—	—	—	—	—		The King's Man Soundtrack
"Overseas" (D-Block Europe featuring Central Cee)	2021	6	—	—	33	—	—	BPI: 2× Platinum; RMNZ: Gold	Home Alone 2
"West Connect" (Luciano featuring Central Cee)	2022	—	6	7	—	—	4		Majestic
"Nice to Meet You" (PinkPantheress featuring Central Cee)	2023	20	—	—	—	—	—		Heaven Knows
"—" denotes a recording that did not chart or was not released in that territory.

== Other charted and certified songs ==
List of other charted songs, with selected chart positions
Title	Year	Peak chart positions										Certifications	Album
Title	Year	UK	UK R&B	AUS	CAN	ITA	IRE	NLD	NZ	SWE Heat.	WW	Certifications	Album
"Ruby"	2021	—	—	—	—	—	—	—	—	—	—	BPI: Silver	Wild West
"Straight Back to It"	2022	25	10	—	—	—	55	—	— (Note: "Straight Back to It" did not enter the NZ Top 40 Singles Chart, but peaked at number 17 on the NZ Hot Singles Chart.)	—	—		23
"Eurovision" (featuring Rondodasosa, Baby Gang, A2 Anti, Morad, Beny Jr, Ashe 22, and Freeze Corleone)	2022	—	—	—	—	57	—	—	—	—	—	FIMI: Gold	23
"Chapters"	2022	69	39	—	—	—	—	—	— (Note: "Chapters" did not enter the NZ Top 40 Singles Chart, but peaked at number 11 on the NZ Hot Singles Chart.)	—	—		No More Leaks
"Bumpy Johnson"	2022	—	—	—	—	—	—	—	— (Note: "Bump Johnson" did not enter the NZ Top 40 Singles Chart, but peaked at number 31 on the NZ Hot Singles Chart.)	—	—		No More Leaks
"Crypto Price"	2022	—	—	—	—	—	—	—	— (Note: "Crypto Price" did not enter the NZ Top 40 Singles Chart, but peaked at number 32 on the NZ Hot Singles Chart.)	—	—		No More Leaks
"Don't Like Drill" (with Meekz)	2022	66	33	—	—	—	—	—	—	—	—		Respect the Come Up
"Trojan Horse" (with Dave)	2023	12	4	58	68	—	16	87	— (Note: "Trojan Horse" did not enter the NZ Top 40 Singles Chart, but peaked at number 9 on the NZ Hot Singles Chart.)	—	—	BPI: Gold; RMNZ: Gold	Split Decision
"Our 25th Birthday" (with Dave)	2023	— (Note: "Our 25th Birthday" did not enter the UK Singles Chart, as chart rules only allow three songs per artist to chart within the top 100 at a time, but peaked at number 46 on the UK Streaming Chart.)	—	—	—	—	—	— (Note: "Our 25th Birthday" did not enter the Single Top 100, but peaked at number 15 on the Single Tip chart.)	— (Note: "Our 25th Birthday" did not enter the NZ Top 40 Singles Chart, but peaked at number 12 on the NZ Hot Singles Chart.)	—	—		Split Decision
"UK Rap" (with Dave)	2023	13	5	63	81	—	14	92	— (Note: "UK Rap" did not enter the NZ Top 40 Singles Chart, but peaked at number 10 on the NZ Hot Singles Chart.)	—	—	BPI: Gold; RMNZ: Gold	Split Decision
"Billion Streams Freestyle"	2024	—	—	—	—	—	—	—	— (Note: "Billion Streams Freestyle" did not enter the NZ Top 40 Singles Chart, but peaked at number 19 on the NZ Hot Singles Chart.)	—	—		—N/a
"Eurostar" (Ninho featuring Central Cee)	2024	—	—	—	—	—	—	—	—	—	—	SNEP: Diamond	NI
"No Introduction"	2025	—	—	—	75	—	—	—	— (Note: "No Introduction" did not enter the NZ Top 40 Singles Chart, but peaked at number 6 on the NZ Hot Singles Chart.)	—	—		Can't Rush Greatness
"5 Star"	2025	—	—	—	98	—	—	—	—	—	—		Can't Rush Greatness
"CRG" (with Dave)	2025	6	—	—	64	—	17	70	— (Note: "CRG" did not enter the NZ Top 40 Singles Chart, but peaked at number 4 on the NZ Hot Singles Chart.)	1	141	BPI: Silver	Can't Rush Greatness
"Limitless"	2025	—	—	—	87	—	—	—	—	—	—		Can't Rush Greatness
"Now We're Strangers"	2025	—	—	—	82	—	—	—	—	—	—		Can't Rush Greatness
"Truth in the Lies" (with Lil Durk)	2025	13	—	—	46	—	—	91	— (Note: "Truth in the Lies" did not enter the NZ Top 40 Singles Chart, but peaked at number 5 on the NZ Hot Singles Chart.)	2	98		Can't Rush Greatness
"Ten" (with Skepta)	2025	—	—	—	97	—	—	—	—	—	—		Can't Rush Greatness
"Dilemma" (Nemzzz featuring Central Cee)	2025	39	—	—	—	—	84	—	—	—	—		Rent's Due
"Yurrr" (with D-Block Europe)	2025	84	—	—	—	—	—	—	—	—	—		PTSD 2
"Wagwan"	2026	30	2	84	62	—	77	— (Note: "Wagwan" did not enter the Single Top 100, but peaked at number six on the Single Tip chart.)	— (Note: "Wagwan" did not enter the NZ Top 40 Singles Chart, but peaked at number 5 on the NZ Hot Singles Chart.)	—	—		All Roads Lead Home
"Feelings"	2026	—	—	—	—	—	—	—	— (Note: "Feelings" did not enter the NZ Top 40 Singles Chart, but peaked at number 13 on the NZ Hot Singles Chart.)	—	—		All Roads Lead Home
"DC10"	2026	—	—	—	—	—	—	—	— (Note: "DC10" did not enter the NZ Top 40 Singles Chart, but peaked at number 20 on the NZ Hot Singles Chart.)	—	—		All Roads Lead Home
"Y Fi Dat"	2026	—	—	—	—	—	—	—	— (Note: "Y Fi Dat" did not enter the NZ Top 40 Singles Chart, but peaked at number 19 on the NZ Hot Singles Chart.)	—	—		All Roads Lead Home
"—" denotes a recording that did not chart or was not released in that territory.

== Guest appearances ==
List of non-single guest appearances, with other performing artists
Title	Year	Other artist(s)	Album
"Spirt Bomb (Remix)"	2016	AJ Tracey, Dave, Skitz, Drifter, Capo Lee, Cadell, Merky ACE, Trims, PK	Non-album remixes
"Bad Habits (Fumez The Engineer Remix)"	2021	Ed Sheeran, Tion Wayne, Fumez the Engineer	Non-album remixes
"Startn Up"	2021	OhGeesy	Geezyworld
"Fuck The Industry"	2022	Seven 7oo, Rondodasosa, Nko	Seven 7oo Mixtape
"Don't Like Drill"	2022	Meekz	Respect The Come Up
"Anthracite"	2023	Ashe 22	Vingt-deux
"Eurostar"	2023	Ninho	NI
"Desacreditado"	2024	L7NNON	Irrastreável
"Dilemma"	2025	Nemzzz	Rent's Due
