= Can't Rush Greatness World Tour =

2025 concert tour by Central Cee

- Tour by Central Cee
- Promotional poster
- Location: Asia; Australia; Europe; New Zealand; North America
- Associated album: Can't Rush Greatness
- Start date: 1 April 2025
- End date: 21 March 2026
- Legs: 4
- No. of shows: 52

Central Cee concert chronology
- Still Loading World Tour (2022); Can't Rush Greatness World Tour (2025–2026)

The Can't Rush Greatness World Tour is the second concert tour by British rapper Central Cee in support of his debut studio album, Can't Rush Greatness (2025). The tour commenced on 1 April 2025 in Oslo and concluded in Bangkok on 21 March 2026, covering several European countries, the UK, Ireland, Australia, New Zealand and many Asian countries.

== Background ==
On 28 January 2025, Central Cee announced the tour, consisting of an initial 39 dates. General sale launched three days later, with an artist pre-sale running from 29 January until 31 January.

In December 2025, Central Cee announced that an Asian leg of the tour would occur in March 2026.

== Set list ==
This set list was taken from the show in London on 24 April 2025. It does not represent all shows throughout the tour.

1. "Limitless"
2. "5 Star"
3. "Day in the Life"
4. "Ruby"
5. "6 for 6"
6. "Cold Shoulder"
7. "Loading"
8. "St. Patrick's"
9. "GBP"
10. "Did It First"
11. "Ten"
12. "Straight Back to It"
13. "Me & You"
14. "Now We're Strangers"
15. "Mrs"
16. "Obsessed with You"
17. "Let Go"
18. "Commitment Issues"
19. "Gen Z Luv"
20. "West Connect"
21. "SUVs"
22. "Doja"
23. "Overseas"
24. "CRG"
25. "UK Rap"
26. "Sprinter"
27. "Truth in the Lies"
28. "Must Be"
29. "Band4Band"
30. "No Introduction"

=== Collaborations ===
On the April 24 show in London, Central Cee performed "Ten" with Skepta; "Wave" with Asake; "Now We're Strangers" with Kamal; "Overseas" with Young Adz; "Sprinter" and "UK Rap" with Dave; and "Band4Band" with Lil Baby. Shallipopi and Sexyy Red also made surprise appearances, performing "Lalo", and "Get It Sexyy" and "Pound Town", respectively.

At the Sydney performance in the Qudos Bank Arena, Central Cee brought drill group Onefour onto the stage for a collaboration.

== Tour dates ==
List of 2025 concerts
| Date (2025) | City | Country | Venue |
|---|---|---|---|
| 1 April | Oslo | Norway | Oslo Spektrum |
| 3 April | Copenhagen | Denmark | Forum Copenhagen |
| 5 April | Hamburg | Germany | Alsterdorfer Sporthalle |
| 6 April | Berlin | Germany | Velodrom |
| 8 April | Amsterdam | Netherlands | Ziggo Dome |
| 10 April | Milan | Italy | Fabrique |
| 11 April | Munich | Germany | Zenith |
| 13 April | Paris | France | Accor Arena |
| 15 April | Düsseldorf | Germany | PSD Bank Dome |
| 16 April | Brussels | Belgium | Forest National |
| 18 April | Birmingham | England | Utilita Arena Birmingham |
| 19 April | Manchester | England | Co-op Live |
| 22 April | Dublin | Ireland | 3Arena |
| 24 April | London | England | The O_{2} Arena |
| 27 April | Glasgow | Scotland | OVO Hydro |
| 2 May | Portland | United States | Roseland Theater |
| 3 May | Seattle | United States | The Showbox |
| 4 May | Seattle | United States | The Showbox |
| 6 May | San Francisco | United States | SF Masonic Auditorium |
| 7 May | Los Angeles | United States | Hollywood Palladium |
| 9 May | Denver | United States | Fillmore Auditorium |
| 11 May | Houston | United States | Bayou Music Center |
| 12 May | Dallas | United States | South Side Ballroom |
| 15 May | Detroit | United States | The Fillmore Detroit |
| 16 May | Chicago | United States | Aragon Ballroom |
| 18 May | Charlotte | United States | The Fillmore Charlotte |
| 19 May | Atlanta | United States | Coca-Cola Roxy |
| 21 May | Philadelphia | United States | The Fillmore Philadelphia |
| 22 May | Silver Spring | United States | The Fillmore Silver Spring |
| 24 May | Toronto | Canada | History |
| 25 May | Toronto | Canada | History |
| 27 May | New York City | United States | Brooklyn Paramount |
| 28 May | New York City | United States | Brooklyn Paramount |
| 29 May | New York City | United States | Terminal 5 |
| 31 May | Boston | United States | MGM Music Hall at Fenway |
| 1 June | Montreal | Canada | M Telus |
| 2 June | Montreal | Canada | M Telus |
| 20 June | Auckland | New Zealand | Spark Arena |
| 22 June | Brisbane | Australia | Brisbane Entertainment Centre |
| 25 June | Sydney | Australia | Qudos Bank Arena |
| 28 June | Melbourne | Australia | Rod Laver Arena |
| 2 July | Perth | Australia | RAC Arena |

List of 2026 concerts
| Date (2026) | City | Country | Venue |
|---|---|---|---|
| 2 March | Kōtō (Note: Labelled as Tokyo in promotional material.) | Japan | Toyosu Pit |
| 4 March | Chengdu | China | Eastern Ultra Music Center |
| 6 March | Shanghai | China | Ji Xi Show Hall 3 |
| 8 March | Foshan | China | Nanhai Sports Center |
| 10 March | Hong Kong | | AsiaWorld–Expo Runway 11 |
| 11 March | Taipei | Taiwan | Taipei International Convention Center |
| 14 March | Goyang (Note: Labelled as Seoul in promotional material.) | South Korea | Korea International Exhibition Center Hall 9 |
| 16 March | Quezon City (Note: Labelled as Manila in promotional material.) | Philippines | New Frontier Theater (Note: The 16 March show was originally scheduled to take place at the Smart Araneta Coliseum, but was moved to the nearby New Frontier Theater for undisclosed reasons.) |
| 18 March | Singapore | | Pasir Panjang Power Station |
| 20 March | Bangkok | Thailand | UOB Live |
| 21 March | Bangkok | Thailand | UOB Live |
