= The Boy Who Played the Harp =

Studio album by Dave
- Released: 24 October 2025
- Studios: Abbey Road (London); The Church (London); Real World (Box); Westlake (Los Angeles); Miraval (Correns)
- Length: 47:43
- Label: Neighbourhood
- Producers: Dave (Note: Under the stage name "Santan"); Dom Maker; Fraser T. Smith; James Blake; Jim Legxacy; Jo Caleb; Jonny Leslie; Kyle Evans; .Nathan

Dave chronology
Split Decision (2023)	The Boy Who Played the Harp (2025)

Singles from The Boy Who Played the Harp
- 1. "Raindance" Released: 23 October 2025

The Boy Who Played the Harp is the third studio album by British rapper Dave, released on 24 October 2025 through Neighbourhood Recordings. The album serves as a follow-up to We're All Alone in This Together (2021), his second studio album, and Split Decision (2023), his collaborative EP with Central Cee. It features guest appearances from James Blake, Jim Legxacy, Kano, Tems, and Nicole Blakk. Dave primarily handled production for the album, alongside Jo Caleb, Jonny Leslie, Kyle Evans, Dom Maker, Fraser T. Smith, .Nathan, and Blake and Legxacy themselves.

The album's title alludes to the Book of Samuel in the Bible (1 Samuel 16:14–23), where Saul summoned a young, brave shepherd, David, to play the harp to soothe him as he was being troubled by evil spirits. The album was released to critical acclaim with many critics praising its lyricism, storytelling, and concept. The album became Dave's third consecutive number one album on the UK Albums Chart, moving approximately 74,000 units in its first week, while becoming the first UK rap artist to debut three albums atop the chart. Internationally, the record debuted at number one in Ireland, the top ten in Australia, Belgium, Denmark, Iceland, New Zealand, the Netherlands, Nigeria, Norway, Portugal, Scotland, Sweden, and Switzerland, and the top twenty in Austria and Canada. The album was preceded by one single: "Raindance" featuring Tems; the song peaked at number one on the UK Singles Chart, marking Dave's fourth chart-topper on the chart. The album was nominated for British Album of the Year at the Brit Awards.

Dave is currently embarking on his The Boy Who Played the Harp Tour in support of the album, which commenced on 2 February 2026, in Munich, Germany, and will conclude on 17 October 2026, in Lagos, Nigeria, consisting of 43 shows spanning Africa, Australia, Europe, and North America.

== Background ==
Following the release of Dave's critically acclaimed and commercially successful second studio album, We're All Alone in This Together (2021), Dave released multiple loose singles and projects including the chart-topping single, "Starlight" (2022), On 1 June and "Sprinter" (2023) with Central Cee, the lead single to the duo's collaborative EP, Split Decision (2023). After dropping loose singles and features in 2023, Dave embarked on a year-long hiatus from music in 2024, selectively teasing the record on social media.

On 1 December 2023, Dave posted an Instagram post of a checklist with several goals, including one that read: "Start album 3". In May 2025, during an interview at a Baller League event, Dave revealed that he was "finishing the album" in Los Angeles and Paris. On 10 May, Dave shared an Instagram post to commemorate the 10th anniversary of his "BL@CKBOX Freestyle", revealing that the album would be released before 2026.

== Recording and title ==
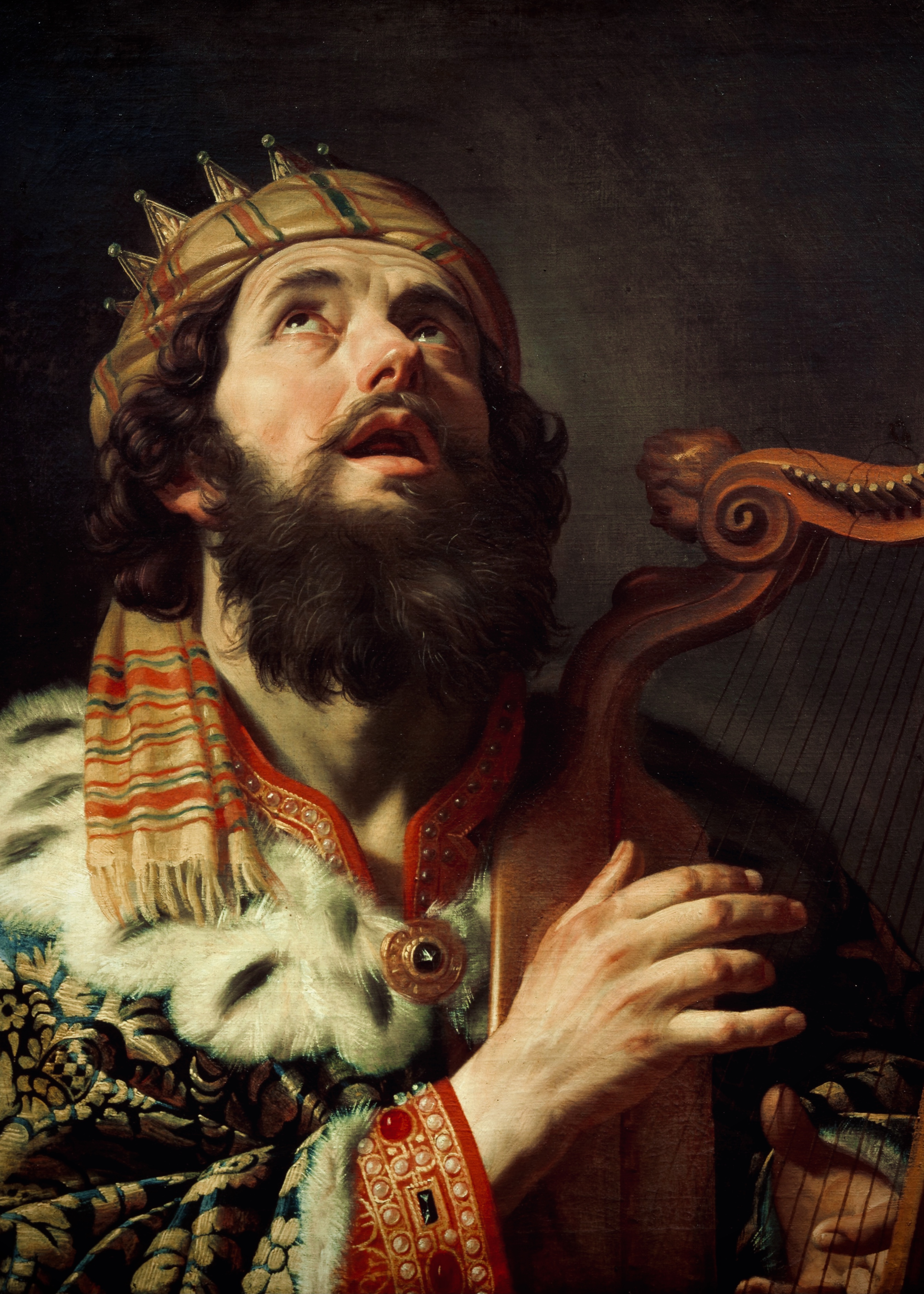
Through themes of God and faith, Dave views himself as a modern version of David.

The majority of the record was produced by Dave himself (under the stage name: Santan), alongside Jo Caleb and Jonny Leslie with repeated appearances from James Blake, Fraser T. Smith, and Kyle Evans.

During the gap between We're All Alone in This Together (2021) and The Boy Who Played the Harp, Dave told The Face he was in the studio everyday working towards the album. During the process Dave would share the songs he was recording with his "inner circle" to gain their feedback hoping to create a body of work that was different from his previous albums and not something you would play "outside with your friends"——noting that "it’s a demanding album. It demands focus. It demands a greater respect for concept and story". Dave intentionally wanted to keep the track listing short and opted to stay away from adding hit songs to the record: "I got a lot of obvious hit records that we’ve left off" due to them feeling "a little bit random" due to the content and subject matter of the record.

Critics referred to the record as a "religious" album, Dave clarified that it's more "biblical than it is religious", continuing that it's "to show the parallels between two people. The purpose of being named something, and living up to your purpose"——referring to his birth name David in relation to King David. The album's title alludes to the Book of Samuel in the Bible (1 Samuel 16:14–23), where Saul summoned a young, brave shepherd, David, to play the harp to soothe him as he was being troubled by evil spirits.

== Music and themes ==
The Boy Who Played the Harp is exactly 47 minutes and 43 seconds long, marking Dave's shortest album. The Boy Who Played the Harp is a conscious hip-hop, UK rap album, accompanied by heavy gospel influence. The album incorporates elements of afrobeats, political hip-hop, alternative hip-hop, and UK R&B. Similar to Dave's debut album, Psychodrama, the record is considered a "concept album" by critics, while his previous record We're All Alone in This Together was not. Throughout the record, Dave follows a continuous theme of God, faith, and destiny while viewing himself as a modern version of David. Throughout the record, Dave covers topics of real-life problems, including anxiety, overthinking, fear of failure, infidelity to his ex-girlfriend, and success guilt. On the record, Dave admitted to being in therapy, expressing that it hadn't worked for him, and that he suffered from alcoholism before reaching sobriety.

While much of the record included strong Biblical references to several books from the Bible, Dave also covered a series of political topics on the record, such as the oppression in the Democratic Republic of the Congo and how despite him advocating for the Congolese, his wealth is depicted by blood diamonds – potentially harvested from Congo, his urge to speak on the genocide in Palestine, however, he's afraid to speak due to the potential repercussions on his career, his advocacy for boycotts of Israel, corruption in many African countries, slavery in the Trucial States, and the mistreatment of locals from those on vacation. Dave also covers the topics of domestic violence, sexual abuse, rape, and methods of sexual harassment.

In "Chapter 16", Dave structures the track as a conversation with Kano, an artist that he once looked up to. The two have a direct conversation on the track as they give each other respect for their contributions to hip-hop. They ask each other introspective questions about the music industry and their own lives. In the track, it was revealed by Dave that its title refers to 1 Samuel 16, the sixteenth chapter of the First Book of Samuel in the Old Testament of the Christian Bible. On "Selfish", Dave spends the 4 minutes and 32 seconds questioning himself and the decisions he makes, revealing the impacts they have on his life while alluding to attending therapy on Harley Street and spending time at the Grosvenor Casino on Edgware Road.

On "Fairchild", Dave tells a story about Tamah, who faced sexual harassment, sexual abuse, and an attempted rape. While Dave narrated the story, Nicole Blakk rapped the first verse from Tamah's perspective. On "The Boy Who Played the Harp", the final and title track, Dave placed himself in different scenarios, debating his own morality. He covers the topics of fighting in World War II for the sake of his country, the Civil Rights Movement and the Decolonisation of Africa in the 1960s, and the Battle of Karbala, putting himself in the shoes of Husayn ibn Ali to test his morality.

== Release and promotion ==
On 1 October, Dave had taken to Instagram to announce the release of the album, revealing the title, artwork, and date, while also releasing vinyls, CDs, cassettes, and bundles to purchase for pre-order. On 10 October, Dave shared a short-film for the album, in collaboration with Stone Island Sound before releasing exclusive Stone Island vinyls, CDs, and cassettes. On 20 October 2025, billboards of Dave alongside other artists, including Tems and James Blake, began to appear in London. Later that day, Dave unveiled the track listing and featured artists, confirming Tems and Blake, alongside Jim Legxacy and Kano. The Boy Who Played the Hard was released for streaming, CD and LP on 24 October 2025, Neighbourhood Recordings. Upon the release of the album, Dave partnered with the London-based streetwear brand, Corteiz to release merchandise bundles of the album. On 29 October, Dave re-released his fan-favourite Psychodrama merchandise, bundled with physicals of The Boy Who Played the Harp.

Despite no pre-released singles, three tracks from the album charted on the UK Singles Chart upon the albums release: "Raindance" (5), "History" (9), and "Chapter 16" (11). UK chart rules prevent artists from having more than three songs in the top 40 at once; without these rules, all ten tracks would have debuted within the top 20. On 26 November 2025, Dave released the Harrison Adair-directed music video for "Chapter 16", which depicts their conversation over dinner. On 9 January 2026, Dave released the Nathan James Tetty-directed music video for "Raindance". Filmed in Lagos, Nigeria, critics have described the video as "leaked wedding video footage", fueling the dating rumours between Dave and Tems. "Raindance" was serviced to Italian radio airplay on 16 January 2026 as the albums lead single. The same month "Raindance" climbed to number one on the UK Singles Chart.

Announced on 16 October, Dave revealed he would embark on his fourth tour "The Boy Who Played the Harp Tour", in support of the album. The tour will commence on 2 February 2026, in Munich, Germany, and will conclude on 30 August 2026, in Leeds, England, consisting of 39 shows spanning Australia, Europe, and North America.

== Critical reception ==
Professional ratings
Aggregate scores
Source	Rating
AnyDecentMusic?	7.6/10
Metacritic	87/100
Review scores
Source	Rating
AllMusic	4.5/5 stars
Clash	9/10
DIY	4.5/5 stars
Financial Times	5/5 stars
The Guardian	5/5 stars
MusicOMH	3.5/5 stars
NME	4/5 stars
Pitchfork	6.5/10
The Times	4/5 stars

Upon release, The Boy Who Played the Harp received positive reviews from music critics. According to the review aggregator Metacritic, The Boy Who Played the Harp received "universal acclaim" based on a weighted average score of 87 out of 100 from 7 critic scores. Aggregator AnyDecentMusic? gave it 7.6 out of 10, based on their assessment of the critical consensus.

Writing for AllMusic, David Crone wrote that "Dave strings religion, responsibility, and hypocrisy into his most intricate album to date" and that the record "is skeletal, grandiose, and contemplative, a web of contradictions where answers come with questions of their own; caught between darkness and light, the U.K. legend wrings out some of his most compelling meditations yet". Clash's Robin Murray described the record as "staggeringly powerful", continuing that "Dave pushes his art to higher levels". Murray wrote that the album "almost purposefully designed to exclude easy hot takes, and narrow definitions", before concluding that, "it's a record that truly speaks for itself, and in truth there is no higher praise we could give it". Adam England for DIY wrote that "across its ten tracks, Dave is found in an equally introspective and outward-looking mood, with faith also playing a major part in his narrative", before concluding that "Dave has grown from hot young talent to a true master storyteller".

Ludovic Hunter-Tilney of the Financial Times wrote that the record is "a five-star offering from the pinnacle of UK rap". The Guardian's Alexis Petridis wrote that The Boy Who Played the Harp "is a very muted-sounding album indeed", noting that it's "big on sparse arrangements, gentle piano figures and subtle pleasures". Petridis wrote that the album is "full of self-examination by a rich and successful pop star might seem like a schlep on paper" before writing that "Dave is a fantastically smart, sharp lyricist, more than capable of making it work" and that the record "feels fascinating, rather than self-indulgent". Petridis concluded his review praising how the album "focuses attention on his voice and exemplary flow". Writing for MusicOMH, Ben Devlin wrote that "the British rapper's third album is a particularly serious affair, tackling religion, guilt and the allure of fame". Kyann-Sian Williams of NME wrote that "Dave has delivered an album that is technically flawless and lyrically impeccable", describing the album as "a commanding work that confirms his place as one of the most accomplished voices in UK music, even if its sombre weight occasionally tempers its immediacy".

Pitchfork's Lawrence Burney began his review writing that the album "plunges back into the contemplative narration Dave is most appreciated for, even to a higher degree than in earlier years of his career", suggesting that "Dave is caught in a loop of his own making". He continued that "he's built a career speaking for the most suppressed from the perspective of a person who comes from similar struggles", before concluding that "[Dave's] materially removed from that reality, he's unsure of where he stands". Writing for The Times, Victoria Segal describes the album as a "commanding — almost stately — record" and that it shows that "there's a lot weighing on Dave, an artist acutely alert to the compromises and contradictions inherent in every choice". Segal concluded, "ten years into Dave's career and life might be increasingly complex, freighted with the reckonings that come with fame, getting older and growing up. Creatively, though, he's still making it look remarkably easy". Rolling Stone UK praised it as "an album that cements Dave as one of the UK's best storytellers."

=== Year-end rankings ===
Year-end rankings for The Boy Who Played the Harp
Publication	Accolade	Rank	Ref.
Clash	Albums Of The Year 2025	45	
Complex	The 50 Best Albums of 2025	18	
Complex UK	Complex UK's Best Albums Of 2025	2	
Dazed	The 20 best albums of 2025, ranked	20	
Double J	The best albums of 2025	39	
HotNewHipHop	The 40 Best Rap Albums Of 2025	35	
Hot Press	50 Best Albums of 2025	47	
The Independent	The Independent's 20 Best Albums of 2025	13	
The Sunday Times	The 25 best albums of 2025, ranked by our critics	8	

== Awards and nominations ==
Awards and nominations for The Boy Who Played the Harp
Organization	Year	Category	Result	Ref.
Brit Awards	2026	Album of the Year	Nominated	

== Commercial performance ==
The Boy Who Played the Harp debuted at number one on the UK Albums Chart, moving 73,799 album-equivalent units; of which 21,602 were from streaming, 51,809 from physical sales and 368 from downloads. Receiving the third highest first-week sales for a rap album behind his own We're All Alone in This Together (74,000) and Tinie Tempah's Disc-Overy (85,000), the album also became the fastest selling rap album on vinyl in the 21st century, selling 15,500 copies in its first week. Dave also became the first UK rapper to debut three albums at #1 and the first to land three albums inside the UK Albums Chart Top 40 with The Boy Who Played the Harp at #1, Psychodrama at #17, and We're All Alone in This Together at #26. Upon its release, the record was certified silver by the British Phonographic Industry (BPI). In December 2025, it was certified gold by the BPI.

Internationally, the record debuted at number one in Ireland, the top ten in Australia, Belgium, the Netherlands, Iceland, New Zealand, Norway, Scotland, Sweden, and Switzerland.

== Track listing ==
No.	Title	Writer(s)	Producer(s)	Length
1.	"History" (featuring James Blake)	David Omoregie; James Litherland; Dominic Maker	Dom Maker; James Blake	4:06
2.	"175 Months"	Omoregie; Litherland; Harrison Fisher^{[b]}; James Norton^{[b]}; Jamil Pierre^{[b]}	Santan; Blake^{[a]}; Jo Caleb^{[a]}; Jonny Leslie^{[a]}	4:34
3.	"No Weapons" (featuring Jim Legxacy)	Omoregie; James Olaloye; Caleb; Leslie; Kyle Evans	Santan; Jim Legxacy; Caleb; Leslie; Evans; .Nathan	3:18
4.	"Chapter 16" (featuring Kano)	Omoregie; Kane Robinson; Litherland	Santan; Blake; Caleb^{[a]}	6:20
5.	"Raindance" (featuring Tems)	Omoregie; Temilade Openiyi; Caleb; Evans; Leslie	Caleb; Leslie; Evans; Legxacy^{[a]}; Santan^{[a]}; Tems^{[a]}	3:39
6.	"Selfish" (featuring James Blake)	Omoregie; Litherland	Santan; Blake; Caleb^{[a]}; Leslie^{[a]}	4:31
7.	"My 27th Birthday"	Omoregie; Caleb; Leslie; Elijah Fox; Grayson Lane	Santan; Caleb; Leslie	7:51
8.	"Marvellous"	Omoregie; Caleb; Evans	Caleb; Evans; Santan^{[a]}	3:01
9.	"Fairchild" (with Nicole Blakk)	Omoregie; Caleb; Evans	Santan; Caleb; Evans; Fraser T. Smith^{[a]}	5:46
10.	"The Boy Who Played the Harp"	Omoregie; Fraser Thorneycroft-Smith; Paul McCartney^{[c]}; John Lennon^{[c]}	Smith; Caleb^{[a]}	4:37
Total length:				47:43

=== Notes ===
- "Chapter 16" is titled "Legacy" on some vinyl pressings
- Nicole Blakk is only credited on some streaming services
- ^{^[a]} indicates an additional producer.

==== Sample and interpolation credits ====
- "History" contains an uncredited interpolation from "Bullet from a Gun", written by Joseph Adenuga and Daniel Mukungu, as performed by Skepta.
- ^{^[b]}"175 Months" contains a sample of "Ego Talkin'", written by Harrison Fisher, James Norton, and Jamil Pierre; and performed by Saint Harison.
- "Raindance" contains uncredited interpolations of:
  - "From Time", written by Aubrey Graham, Jhené Chilombo, Noah Shebib, and Jason Beck, and performed by Drake and Jhené Aiko;
  - "Lean wit It, Rock wit It", written by Carlos A. Valente, Jamall Willingham, Gerald Tiller, Bernard Leverette, Maurice Gleaton, D'Angelo Hunt, Charles Hammond, and Robert Hill, and performed by Dem Franchize Boyz, Peanut, and Charlay;
  - "You", written by Lloyd Polite, Dwayne Carter, Jasper Cameron, Gary Kemp, Maurice Sinclair, and J. Pilkington, and performed by Lloyd and Lil Wayne;
  - and "Shimmy Shimmy Ya", written by Russell Jones and Robert Diggs, and performed by Ol' Dirty Bastard.
- ^{^[c]}"The Boy Who Played the Harp" contains a sample of "And I Love Her", written by Lennon–McCartney and performed by the Beatles.

== Personnel ==
Credits adapted from Tidal and liner notes.

=== Musicians ===
- Dave – vocals (all tracks), guitar (6)
- James Blake – vocals (1), bass guitar (1), piano (1, 4, 6), Rhodes piano (1), synthesiser (1)
- Jo Caleb – synthesiser (2, 5), guitar (3, 5, 8, 9), Rhodes piano (5), bass (4, 5, 7, 9), additional programming (6)
- Matheus "LudoWic" Lodewijk – synthesiser (2, 6, 7–9)
- Matthias Kabel – Trautonium (2, 6–9)
- Jim Legxacy – vocals (3)
- Eleanor Turner – harp (3, 4, 7)
- Leon Foster Thomas – steelpans (3)
- Kano – vocals (4)
- Tobie Tripp – strings (4)
- Tems – vocals (5)
- Kyle Evans – piano (5)
- Josh Smith – drums (5)
- Jonny Leslie – additional programming (6)
- Elijah Fox – piano (7)
- Ruti Olajugbagbe – background vocals (9)
- Daniel Casimir – double bass (9, 10)
- Zosia Jagodzinska – cello (10)
- Fraser T. Smith – piano (10)

=== Technical ===
- Joe LaPorta – mastering
- Jonny Leslie – engineering (all tracks), mixing (2–5, 7–10)
- Bob Mackenzie – engineering (1)
- Jesper Nielsen – engineering (1, 3, 8, 9)
- Jon Castelli – mixing (1)
- Louis Rogove – engineering (3, 10)
- Seth Taylor – engineering (3)
- James Blake – engineering (6)
- Josh Smith – engineering (6)
- David Wrench – mixing (6)

== Charts ==
=== Weekly charts ===
Weekly chart performance for The Boy Who Played the Harp
Chart (2025)	Peak position
Australian Albums (ARIA)	7
Australian Hip Hop/R&B Albums (ARIA)	1
Austrian Albums (Ö3 Austria)	15
Belgian Albums (Ultratop Flanders)	4
Belgian Albums (Ultratop Wallonia)	50
Canadian Albums (Billboard)	19
Danish Albums (Hitlisten)	2
Dutch Albums (Album Top 100)	2
French Albums (SNEP)	86
Finnish Albums (Suomen virallinen lista)	22
German Albums (Offizielle Top 100)	22
Hungarian Albums (MAHASZ)	37
Icelandic Albums (Tónlistinn)	4
Irish Albums (Official Charts)	1
Lithuanian Albums (AGATA)	22
New Zealand Albums (RMNZ)	10
Nigerian Albums (TurnTable)	2
Norwegian Albums (IFPI Norge)	10
Portuguese Albums (AFP)	5
Scottish Albums (Official Charts)	2
Spanish Albums (PROMUSICAE)	89
Swedish Albums (Sverigetopplistan)	6
Swiss Albums (Schweizer Hitparade)	5
UK Albums (Official Charts)	1
UK R&B Albums (Official Charts)	1

=== Year-end charts ===
Year-end chart performance for The Boy Who Played the Harp
Chart (2025)	Position
UK Albums (OCC)	78

== Certifications ==
Certifications for The Boy Who Played the Harp
Region	Certification	Certified units/sales
Belgium (BRMA)	Gold	10,000^{‡}
Denmark (IFPI Danmark)	Gold	10,000^{‡}
New Zealand (RMNZ)	Gold	7,500^{‡}
United Kingdom (BPI)	Gold	100,000^{‡}
^{‡} Sales+streaming figures based on certification alone.

== Release history ==
Release dates and formats for The Boy Who Played the Harp
Region	Date	Label(s)	Format(s)	Edition(s)	Ref.
Various	24 October 2025	Neighbourhood Recordings	CD; LP; cassette; streaming; digital download	Standard	
Various	24 October 2025	Neighbourhood Recordings	CD; LP; cassette	Stone Island Exclusive	
Various	24 October 2025	Neighbourhood Recordings	CD; LP; cassette	Spotify Exclusive	
