= Which One =

Single by Drake and Central Cee

from the album Maid of Honour
- Released: July 25, 2025
- Length: 2:49
- Label: OVO; Republic
- Songwriters: Aubrey Graham; Oakley Caesar-Su; Octavian Godji; B4U; Ozan Yıldırım; Lars Christen; Cruz
- Producers: O Lil Angel; B4U; OZ; bonboi; Cruz

Drake singles chronology
"What Did I Miss?" (2025)	"Which One" (2025)	"Dog House" (2025)

Central Cee singles chronology
"GBP" (2025)	"Which One" (2025)

Audio video
- "Which One" on YouTube

"Which One" is a song by Canadian rapper Drake and British rapper Central Cee. It was released on July 25, 2025, through OVO Sound and Republic Records; originally speculated to be the second single from the former's ninth album Iceman, it instead served as the lead single for his simultaneously released tenth studio album, Maid of Honour. The track marks the second official collaboration between the two artists following 2023's "On the Radar Freestyle". The song reached number one on US Rhythmic Radio in October 2025.

== Background and promotion ==
Following the release of "On the Radar Freestyle" in July 2023, Central Cee was asked in a January 2025 interview, coinciding with the release of his debut studio album, Can't Rush Greatness, about the possibility of another collaboration with Drake. At the time, he revealed that they had another song "in the vault" but felt including it on the album would be too "predictable". He confirmed they had worked on additional material but preferred to save it for a future release.

A snippet of the track was first previewed during Drake's "Iceman: Episode 1" livestream. Drake would again preview the track on July 12, 2025, during his Wireless Festival performance in London. On July 24, just three weeks after releasing the single "What Did I Miss?", Drake premiered "Which One" during a second livestream titled "Iceman: Episode 2". The livestream had been teased the day prior, suggesting the imminent release of a new single, much like the rollout for "What Did I Miss?". The song debuted in a segment where both artists are seen watching a woman dance in an empty swimming pool.

== Composition and lyrics ==
"Which One" is described as an "island-tinged" track, blending smooth rap with Caribbean-inspired rhythms. Drake opens the song in a familiar mode, addressing a potential love interest who stands out from her friends. Central Cee continues the narrative, asking the woman if she's "here for a good time or a long time".

The production features a pulsating beat with a "subdued menace" that gives space for both "paranoia and pride" to emerge. With no prominent chorus, the track functions as a back-and-forth exchange, allowing each artist to share their perspective in distinct styles.

== Unofficial remix ==
In August 2025, an unofficial remix by a Dutch DJ known as DJ Noon, featuring the instrumental version of "1er Gaou" by Magic System, gained popularity on TikTok, appearing in over 70,000 videos at the beginning of the month.

== Charts ==
=== Weekly charts ===
Weekly chart performance for "Which One"
Chart (2025)	Peak position
Australia (ARIA)	16
Australia Hip Hop/R&B (ARIA)	2
Canada Hot 100 (Billboard)	4
Denmark (Tracklisten)	35
Dominican Republic Anglo Airplay (Monitor Latino)	11
Estonia Airplay (TopHit)	59
Global 200 (Billboard)	14
Ireland (IRMA)	12
Lebanon (Lebanese Top 20)	18
Lithuania (AGATA)	45
Lithuania Airplay (TopHit)	30
Luxembourg (Billboard)	18
Malta Airplay (Radiomonitor)	19
Middle East and North Africa (IFPI)	15
Netherlands (Single Top 100)	33
New Zealand (Recorded Music NZ)	18
Nigeria Airplay (TurnTable)	35
Norway (IFPI Norge)	55
Portugal (AFP)	25
Sweden (Sverigetopplistan)	62
Switzerland (Schweizer Hitparade)	16
United Arab Emirates (IFPI)	11
UK Singles (Official Charts)	4
UK Hip Hop/R&B (Official Charts)	1
US Billboard Hot 100	23
US Hot R&B/Hip-Hop Songs (Billboard)	3
US Rhythmic Airplay (Billboard)	1

=== Monthly charts ===
Monthly chart performance for "Which One"
Chart (2025)	Peak position
Estonia Airplay (TopHit)	75
Lithuania Airplay (TopHit)	73

=== Year-end charts ===
Year-end chart performance for "Which One"
Chart (2025)	Position
US Hot R&B/Hip-Hop Songs (Billboard)	63

== Certifications ==
Certifications for "Which One"
Region	Certification	Certified units/sales
Australia (ARIA)	Gold	35,000^{‡}
New Zealand (RMNZ)	Gold	15,000^{‡}
Portugal (AFP)	Gold	12,000^{‡}
United Kingdom (BPI)	Silver	200,000^{‡}
Streaming
Greece (IFPI Greece)	Gold	1,000,000^{†}
^{‡} Sales+streaming figures based on certification alone.^{†} Streaming-only figures based on certification alone.

== Release history ==
Release history for "Which One"
Region	Date	Format(s)	Label(s)	Ref.
Various	July 25, 2025	Digital download; streaming	OVO; Republic	
Italy	July 31, 2025	Radio airplay	Island Italy	
United States	August 12, 2025	Rhythmic contemporary radio	OVO; Republic	
