= Lekaa Beats =

Babatope Olalekan Bello known professionally as Lekaa Beats is a Nigerian British singer, songwriter and record producer based in London. His music is a blend of Afropop, drill and hip-hop.

== Career ==
Lekaa Beats began developing music production skills at St Charles Catholic Sixth Form College, London studios. His early music interest was influenced by rappers including Lil Wayne and Eminem incorporating production styles of prominent hip-hop singers, Chris Brown and Drake. His production style later expanded to include Afropop, drill and hip-hop.

In 2022, Lekaa Beats produced One Up, Central Cee lead single of his EP, No Morre Leaks. In 2023, he signed a global publishing deal with Sony Music Publishing. Same year, he composed and produced Problem Fixer for the album Beautiful and Brutal Yard by J Hus. he produced Omah Lay’s hit single Holy Ghost (2023) and ANGELS (2026).

Lekaa Beats has collaborated with several artists including Tems, Adekunle Gold, Blaqbonez, ODUMODUBLVCK and Nasty C. for the EP Confuse The Enemy (2024). In 2026, his singles Isaka II (6am) and ANGLES were listed in the Official Nigeria Top 100 charts.

== Discography ==
- Confuse The Enemy (with Nasty C) (2024)
- TECHNICIAN (with ODUMODUBLVCK and Blaqbonez) (2024)
- Piano (with Gabzy) (2024)
- Element (with Zinoleesky) (2024)
