= Can't Rush Greatness =

Studio album by Central Cee
- Released: 24 January 2025
- Recorded: 2023–2024
- Genre: British hip-hop; UK drill
- Length: 48:43
- Label: Columbia; CC4L
- Producer: Albert Hype; Ambezza; Arthur Bean; Aunix; Aasis Beats; Blindforlove; Darko; Eight8; Einer Bankz; Flowrency; Frank Moses; Frank Rio; Fraxille; Gabe Lucas; Geenaro; Ghana Beats; Gino Nano; Harley Arsenault; Harry Beech; IanoBeatz; Jester Beats; Joe Stanley; Jonas Lee; Jonny Leslie; Jota Rosa; Kabeh; Kendox; Kid Hazel; Lily Kaplan; LIOHN; Mason Beats; NoFuk; Pale1080; Peter Iskander; Pontus Persson; R14; Santan Dave; Scott Styles; Synthetic; Whotfisvlex

Central Cee chronology
Split Decision (2023)	Can't Rush Greatness (2025)	All Roads Lead Home (2026)

Alternative cover
- Trapstar Edition cover

Singles from Can't Rush Greatness
- 1. "Band4Band" Released: 24 May 2024; 2. "Gen Z Luv" Released: 25 July 2024; 3. "GBP" Released: 17 January 2025

Can't Rush Greatness (stylised in all caps) is the debut studio album by British rapper Central Cee, released on 24 January 2025 through CC4L and Columbia Records. The album features guest appearances from Young Miko, 21 Savage, Dave, Lil Durk, Skepta and Lil Baby.

Following an anticipated release, the album debuted at number one on the UK Albums Chart and at number nine on the Billboard 200, becoming the first top-ten UK rap album in America, and Central Cee's second number-one in the UK. It also debuted at number one in Belgium, the Netherlands, Germany, Ireland, New Zealand, Norway, and Switzerland. The album received generally positive reviews from critics, who praised its production. However, it also faced criticism for inconsistencies in its lyrical content, with differing opinions on the album's level of risk-taking.

== Background and recording ==
The term "can't rush greatness" has been used several times by Central Cee during his career, dating back to his "Mad About Bars" performance from 2020.

Since the release of his previous full length project, 23 (2022), Central Cee has garnered international attention unseen for a British rap artist due to a series of popular singles, starting with "Doja" (2022) and "Sprinter" (2023). After the release of "Sprinter" and the subsequent Split Decision EP with Dave, Central Cee was subject to a "heated bidding war" between record labels and signed to Columbia Records for a two-album deal. Can't Rush Greatness consequently serves as his first major-label release.

On 11 September 2024, Central Cee appeared in an interview with Dazed, during which he noted that the album was receiving its "finishing touches". He then spoke on what made this album different from his prior projects.

With the mixtapes, I was living in [the same] house I grew up in. Now we've elevated, we're actually musicians. There were times it was hard to say man's a musician. I was just a guy that [went into the] studio [sometimes]. Now, I'm an artist.

The album was formally announced on 31 October 2024, and a press release revealed that the album was recorded across multiple locations worldwide, and featured production from Dave.

A British GQ interview from November 2024 described the instrumentation as "luxurious [and] drill-adjacent", with a variety of samples including Brazilian funk and 2000s R&B.

== Release and promotion ==
On 9 May 2024, Central Cee released the YouTube exclusive single, "CC Freestyle". In the song's official music video, the letters "CRG" were seen in the intro, hinting at the start of the album's rollout.

In October 2024, Central Cee appeared on an NFL broadcast when it was announced that the album Can't Rush Greatness was "coming soon". On 31 October, he shared the album's cover art and announced its release of 24 January 2025. On 5 December, Central Cee premiered the first episode of his CRG Radio on Apple Music 1.

On 6 December, Central Cee and London streetwear brand Trapstar collaborated to release album bundles that came with a "Trapstar Edition" album cover.

On 26 December, Central Cee and his streetwear brand Syna released additional album bundles and clothing that mirrors the album's rose gold theme. A third album cover was released with the bundles.

The album's track list was revealed on 21 January 2025.

=== Singles ===
On 24 May 2024, Central Cee released the album's lead single, "Band4Band" with Lil Baby. The track peaked at number 3 on the UK singles chart and at number 18 on the US Billboard Hot 100, the highest position for a UK rap song on the latter chart.

On 25 July 2024, he released the album's second single, "Gen Z Luv" which peaked at number 34 on the UK singles chart. Later in August he released two singles, "Bolide Noir" with French rapper JRK 19 and "Billion Streams Freestyle." In September, he released the single "Moi" with British singer Raye. On 29 October, Central Cee released the single "One by One" which he debuted on ColorsxStudios. However, none of these singles were featured on the album's final track-list.

On 16 January 2025, the single "GBP" with fellow British-born rapper 21 Savage was released alongside a music video directed by Cole Bennett. Hours before the album released, the track "Limitless" premiered on Central Cee's YouTube channel with a music video.

== Artwork ==
The album's main cover art was shot by Jack Bridgeland, who previously shot the covers for Wild West (2021) and 23 (2022). It features Central Cee wearing a Union Jack beanie, Syna earrings and puffer jacket, as well as a rose gold and diamond chain depicting Queen Elizabeth II and rose gold and diamond rings that spell out the words "Can't Rush".

== Critical reception ==
Professional ratings
Aggregate scores
Source	Rating
Metacritic	72/100
Review scores
Source	Rating
Clash	8/10
Evening Standard	3/5 stars
The Guardian	4/5 stars
The Independent	4/5 stars
NME	4/5 stars
The Observer	3/5 stars
Rolling Stone	4/5 stars
The Times	3/5 stars

Can't Rush Greatness was met with "generally favorable reviews" according to review aggregator Metacritic, receiving a score of 72 out of 100 based on ten critic reviews.

Joe Simpson of Clash wrote, "Central Cee does an excellent job at positioning himself as an artist without borders, in addition to positioning himself as a homegrown rapper with countless nods to his roots and his heritage." Rosain O'Connor of The Independent stated that "Can't Rush Greatness is a bold statement, yes, but one that Central Cee does, by and large, live up to." Kyann-Sian Matthews of NME wrote, "Central Cee could easily remain hidden behind his signature mystique, but instead tells the story of a boy turned man all while on the world's stage. No smoke and mirrors, the album is authentically Cench every step of the way." Alexis Petridis of The Guardian stated that "there's very little about Can't Rush Greatness that suggests it's likely to dent Central Cee's remarkable progress."

Ammar Kalia of The Observer wrote that on the album, Cee "taps into that hit-making sensibility but struggles to maintain momentum across 17 tracks". Will Hodgkinson of The Times said that "you can’t help but enjoy Caesar-Su's lyrical artistry, not least because he's smart enough to see through his hype."

=== Accolades ===
Publication	Accolade	Rank	Ref.
British GQ	The 20 best albums of 2025	—N/a	
Complex	The 50 Best Albums of 2025	16	
Complex UK	Best Albums Of 2025	5	
HotNewHipHop	The 40 Best Rap Albums Of 2025	31	
Rolling Stone	The 100 Best Albums of 2025	51	
Rolling Stone UK	25 best albums of 2025	—N/a	

== Commercial performance ==
Can't Rush Greatness received the biggest Spotify debut for a hip-hop album of 2025 upon release, with over 19 million streams in its first day, simultaneously breaking the record for the most streams for a UK rap album in a single day.

In the UK, Can't Rush Greatness debuted at number one on the UK Albums Chart with 42,472 album-equivalent units; of which 22,614 were from streaming, 17,935 from physical sales and 1,923 from downloads. The track "CRG" with Dave debuted at number six on the UK Singles Chart, moving the previously released single "GBP" with 21 Savage down to number seven.

In the US, Can't Rush Greatness debuted at number nine on the Billboard 200 with 37,000 album-equivalent units; of which 10,000 were physical sales. It was the first British rap album to enter the chart since Skepta's Konnichiwa (2016), and the first to reach the top-ten.

== Controversy ==
Shortly after the album's release, social media users began to report that Central Cee dissed fellow UK rapper Aitch on the song "5 Star". In the track, he rapped: "I felt like a prick when I went to the BRITs and they gave the award to a guy called Aitch / I had my acceptance speech prepared like, 'Long live F's', I'm goin' insane". Central Cee was referring to losing to Aitch at the Brit Awards 2023 for the Brit Award for British Hip Hop/Grime/Rap Act. On the same day, Aitch responded to the diss against him with a track titled "A Guy Called?", in which he addressed the Brit Award, alongside several other rumours surrounding Central Cee in the music industry.

== Track listing ==
Can't Rush Greatness track listing
No.	Title	Writer(s)	Producer(s)	Length
1.	"No Introduction"	Oakley Caesar-Su; Jonas Gumdal; Eight8; Spencer Harris; Harley Arsenault	Fraxille; Eight8; Einer Bankz; Harley Arsenault	2:41
2.	"5 Star"	Caesar-Su; Gumdal; Malik Reinicke	Fraxille; Kendox	2:40
3.	"Gata" (with Young Miko)	Caesar-Su; María Ramírez; Albert Melendez; Francisco Ríos III; Abner Boria; Eight9Fly	Albert Hype; Frank Rio	3:25
4.	"St. Patrick's"	Caesar-Su; R14; Joseph Stanley; Julius Noah; Maria Herold; Dennis Coles; Robert Diggs; Gary Grice; Lamont Hawkins	R14; Darko; Joe Stanley; Jester Beats; Arthur Bean^{[a]}	2:40
5.	"GBP" (with 21 Savage)	Caesar-Su; Shéyaa Abraham-Joseph; Richard Zastenker; Gino Nano; Pontus Persson	Liohn; Gino Nano; Pontus Persson; Eight8; Harry Beech; Jonny Leslie	2:34
6.	"Top Freestyle"	Caesar-Su; Charley Mason	Mason X Beats	3:04
7.	"Up North"	Caesar-Su; R14; Arthur Bean	R14; Bean; Ezra Skys^{[a]}	2:43
8.	"CRG" (with Dave)	Caesar-Su; David Omoregie; Frank Moses; BlindForLove; Pale1080	Bean; Frank Moses; BlindForLove; Pale1080; Leslie^{[a]}	3:02
9.	"Limitless"	Caesar-Su; Gumdal; Harris; Gabe Lucas	Fraxille; Einer Bankz; Lucas; Leslie^{[a]}	3:21
10.	"Now We're Strangers"	Caesar-Su; Ahmar Bailey; Jonas Lee; Ian Stoffer; Alejandro Miranda; Lucas Siqueira	Kid Hazel; Jonas Lee; IanoBeatz; Kabeh; Whotfisvlex	3:26
11.	"Truth in the Lies" (with Lil Durk)	Caesar-Su; Durk Banks; Arsenault; Mikkel Eriksen; Tor Hermansen; Shaffer Smith	Harley Arsenault	2:22
12.	"Ten" (with Skepta)	Caesar-Su; Joseph Adenuga, Jr.; Scott Styles; Krzysztof Nowakowski	Scott Styles; NoFuk	2:02
13.	"Band4Band" (with Lil Baby)	Caesar-Su; Dominique Jones; Gennaro Frenken; Dennis Opoku; Ayrton Bagshaw	Geenaro; Ghana Beats; Aasis Beats	2:20
14.	"Gen Z Luv"	Caesar-Su	Ambezza; Eight8; Peter Iskander	2:33
15.	"Walk in Wardrobe"	Caesar-Su; Arsenault; Bean; Omoregie; Javier Mercado; Isaiah Woodworth-Lies	Arsenault; Bean; Dave; Synthetic; Aunix	3:18
16.	"Must Be"	Caesar-Su; Arsenault; Mercado; Artem Zherdev	Arsenault; Synthetic; Flowrency; Bean^{[a]}	2:45
17.	"Don't Know Anymore"	Caesar-Su; Mathias Liyew; Lily Kaplan	Ambezza; Lily Kaplan	3:47
Total length:				48:51

Trapstar Edition
No.	Title	Length
4.	"St. Patrick's" (featuring A2 Anti)

Notes

- "Walk in Wardrobe" features additional vocals from Kai Cenat.

Samples

- "Truth in the Lies" contains a sample of "So Sick", written by Mikkel S. Eriksen, Tor Erik Hermansen and Shaffer Smith, as performed by Ne-Yo.

== Personnel ==
- Central Cee – vocals, engineering
- Joe LaPorta – mastering
- Manon Grandjean – mixing (tracks 1–8, 11, 14–17)
- Jonny Leslie – mixing (tracks 9, 10, 12, 13)
- Sky Jones – saxophone (track 7)

== Charts ==
=== Weekly charts ===
Chart performance for Can't Rush Greatness
Chart (2025)	Peak position
Australian Albums (ARIA)	2
Australian Hip Hop/R&B Albums (ARIA)	1
Austrian Albums (Ö3 Austria)	1
Belgian Albums (Ultratop Flanders)	1
Belgian Albums (Ultratop Wallonia)	11
Canadian Albums (Billboard)	2
Danish Albums (Hitlisten)	2
Dutch Albums (Album Top 100)	1
Finnish Albums (Suomen virallinen lista)	9
French Albums (SNEP)	9
German Albums (Offizielle Top 100)	1
Hungarian Albums (MAHASZ)	3
Icelandic Albums (Tónlistinn)	6
Irish Albums (OCC)	1
Italian Albums (FIMI)	14
Japanese Hot Albums (Billboard Japan)	90
Lithuanian Albums (AGATA)	7
New Zealand Albums (RMNZ)	1
Nigerian Albums (TurnTable)	3
Norwegian Albums (VG-lista)	1
Polish Albums (ZPAV)	7
Scottish Albums (OCC)	2
Spanish Albums (Promusicae)	4
Swedish Albums (Sverigetopplistan)	5
Swiss Albums (Schweizer Hitparade)	1
UK Albums (OCC)	1
UK R&B Albums (OCC)	1
US Billboard 200	9
US Top R&B/Hip-Hop Albums (Billboard)	3

=== Year-end charts ===
Year-end chart performance for Can't Rush Greatness
Chart (2025)	Position
Australian Albums (ARIA)	58
Austrian Albums (Ö3 Austria)	68
Belgian Albums (Ultratop Flanders)	70
New Zealand Albums (RMNZ)	30
Swiss Albums (Schweizer Hitparade)	37
UK Albums (OCC)	34
US Top R&B/Hip-Hop Albums (Billboard)	100

== Certifications ==
Certifications for Can't Rush Greatness
Region	Certification	Certified units/sales
Canada (Music Canada)	Gold	40,000^{‡}
Denmark (IFPI Danmark)	Gold	10,000^{‡}
Hungary (MAHASZ)	Gold	2,000^{‡}
Netherlands (NVPI)	Gold	18,600^{‡}
New Zealand (RMNZ)	Gold	7,500^{‡}
United Kingdom (BPI)	Gold	100,000^{‡}
^{‡} Sales+streaming figures based on certification alone.
