= Let Go (Central Cee song) =

2022 single by Central Cee

Single by Central Cee
- Released: 15 December 2022
- Genre: UK drill
- Length: 2:54
- Label: Self-released
- Songwriters: Central Cee; Nastylgia
- Producers: Nastylgia; KwolleM

Central Cee singles chronology
"One Up" (2022)	"Let Go" (2022)	"Me & You" (2023)

Music video
- "Let Go" on YouTube

"Let Go" is a song by British rapper and songwriter Central Cee. It was released as a single on 15 December 2022. The song samples "Let Her Go" (2012) by English singer-songwriter Passenger.

== Background and release ==
On 8 December 2022, the rapper took to TikTok to ask his followers if they approved of a clip of the song. The snippet quickly went viral across the app. The song was described as flipping the original message of the song it samples and turning it into an outlet for his desires after his girlfriend left Cee.

== Critical reception ==
Aron A. of HotNewHipHop opined that all involved turned the original song into a "velvety drill banger" that showcases "Cee's vulnerability", as well as a "more melodic style" than usual. Jack Lynch at Hypebeast wrote that the song sees the rapper tapping "into his current love affairs", while simultaneously giving "wider love advice for his audience". Raphael Helfand of The Fader thought the chorus was "more befitting" than his previous hit single "Doja". James Keith of Complex noticed the productional changes. While the "808 slides and hi-hat triplets" are still present, the rapper traded his "punchiness and bravado" for a "kind of stark, candid rhyming".

== Music video ==
The music video was released on 15 December 2022 and was shot at Alexandra Palace in London on 22 November 2022, right before his "Still Loading" concert at the venue. It was directed by long-term collaborator Kunography.

== Charts ==
=== Weekly charts ===
Weekly chart performance for "Let Go"
Chart (2022–2023)	Peak position
Australia (ARIA)	11
Austria (Ö3 Austria Top 40)	9
Belgium (Ultratop 50 Flanders)	44
Belgium (Ultratop 50 Wallonia)	7
Canada (Canadian Hot 100)	23
Czech Republic Singles Digital (ČNS IFPI)	4
Denmark (Tracklisten)	12
Finland (Suomen virallinen lista)	14
France (SNEP)	1
Germany (GfK)	9
Global 200 (Billboard)	31
Hungary (Single Top 40)	16
Hungary (Stream Top 40)	11
Ireland (IRMA)	8
Italy (FIMI)	12
Latvia (LAIPA)	19
Lithuania (AGATA)	33
Netherlands (Single Top 100)	7
New Zealand (Recorded Music NZ)	13
Norway (VG-lista)	11
Poland (Polish Airplay Top 100)	53
Portugal (AFP)	1
Romania (Billboard)	22
San Marino (SMRRTV Top 50)	37
Slovakia Airplay (ČNS IFPI)	5
Slovakia Singles Digital (ČNS IFPI)	5
Spain (PROMUSICAE)	20
Sweden (Sverigetopplistan)	5
Switzerland (Schweizer Hitparade)	3
Turkey (Radiomonitor Türkiye)	8
UK Singles (OCC)	6
UK Indie (OCC)	2
UK Hip Hop/R&B (OCC)	1
US Rhythmic (Billboard)	20

=== Year-end charts ===
Year-end chart performance for "Let Go"
Chart (2023)	Position
Australia (ARIA)	78
Belgium (Ultratop 50 Wallonia)	50
Germany (Official German Charts)	83
Switzerland (Schweizer Hitparade)	57
UK Singles (OCC)	59

== Certifications ==
Certifications and sales for "Let Go"
Region	Certification	Certified units/sales
Australia (ARIA)	Platinum	70,000^{‡}
Austria (IFPI Austria)	Platinum	30,000^{‡}
Canada (Music Canada)	Platinum	80,000^{‡}
Denmark (IFPI Danmark)	Gold	45,000^{‡}
France (SNEP)	Diamond	333,333^{‡}
Italy (FIMI)	Platinum	100,000^{‡}
New Zealand (RMNZ)	Platinum	30,000^{‡}
Poland (ZPAV)	Gold	25,000^{‡}
Portugal (AFP)	Platinum	10,000^{‡}
Spain (PROMUSICAE)	Platinum	60,000^{‡}
Switzerland (IFPI Switzerland)	Platinum	20,000^{‡}
United Kingdom (BPI)	Platinum	600,000^{‡}
Streaming
Sweden (GLF)	Platinum	8,000,000^{†}
^{‡} Sales+streaming figures based on certification alone.^{†} Streaming-only figures based on certification alone.
