= Split Decision (EP) =

EP by Dave and Central Cee
- Released: 5 June 2023
- Recorded: 2023
- Genre: British hip-hop
- Length: 16:23
- Labels: Neighbourhood; Live Yours
- Producers: Dave; Jim Legxacy; Jo Caleb; Joe Reeves; Jonny Leslie; Kamal.; Kyle Evans; TR The Producer

Dave chronology
We're All Alone In This Together (2021)	Split Decision (2023)	The Boy Who Played the Harp (2025)

Central Cee chronology
No More Leaks (2022)	Split Decision (2023)	Can't Rush Greatness (2025)

Singles from Split Decision
- 1. "Sprinter" Released: 1 June 2023

Split Decision is a collaborative EP by British rappers Dave and Central Cee. It is Dave's third EP overall, and Cee's fifth. It was released on 5 June 2023 by Neighbourhood and Live Yours. It was preceded by its lead single Sprinter, which was released four days prior.

== Background ==
Dave and Central Cee first collaborated in 2016 on the remix to the track Spirit Bomb by AJ Tracey. Dave later produced the track End of the Beginning on Central Cee's mixtape 23 (2022).

On 1 June, the lead single Sprinter released alongside a music video. It broke the record for the most streams for a hip-hop song in Spotify UK.

The EP was released on Dave's 25th birthday, which was a day after Central Cee's 25th birthday.

== Critical reception ==
Professional ratings
Review scores
Source	Rating
WhyNow	4/5 stars

Archie Brydon from WhyNow stated that the EP "highlights both of their known abilities, as well as showcasing a genuine chemistry between them." Concluding his review, he notes that though just four tracks long, it "is a quality collaboration to help kickstart the British summer." Writing for Complex UK, Kameron Hay noted that Split Decision features "the perfect mix of lyricism, wordplay, luxurious flexing, and humor". He stated that "Central Cee balances light-hearted bars with menacing wordplay" and that "the chemistry between the two is undeniable". Concluding his review, he stated that it's "one of the best rap releases of the year thus far, and a project that leaves you wanting more from the dynamic duo".

=== Accolades ===
Accolades for Split Decision
Publication	Accolade	Rank	Ref.
Complex UK	Complex's Best Albums of 2023	18	

== Track listing ==
Split Decision track listing
No.	Title	Writer(s)	Producer(s)	Length
1.	"Trojan Horse"	David Omoregie; Oakley Caesar-Su	Dave	4:08
2.	"Sprinter"	Omoregie; Caesar-Su; Kyle Evans; Jonny Leslie; Jo Caleb; Jim Legxacy	Dave; Kyle Evans; Jonny Leslie; Jo Caleb; Jim Legxacy; TR The Producer	3:37
3.	"Our 25th Birthday"	Omoregie; Caesar-Su; Kamal Prescod; Joe Reeves	Dave; Kamal.; Joe Reeves	5:07
4.	"UK Rap"	Omoregie; Caesar-Su; Evans	Kyle Evans	3:18
Total length:				16:36

== Charts ==
Chart performance for Split Decision
Chart (2023)	Peak position
Austrian Albums (Ö3 Austria)	56
Canadian Albums (Billboard)	13
Danish Albums (Hitlisten)	24
Swiss Albums (Schweizer Hitparade)	18
US Heatseekers Albums (Billboard)	6
