= GBP (song) =

2025 single by Central Cee featuring 21 Savage

Single by Central Cee featuring 21 Savage

from the album Can't Rush Greatness
- Released: January 17, 2025
- Genre: British hip hop; UK drill
- Length: 2:34
- Label: CC4L; Columbia
- Songwriters: Oakley Caesar-Su; Shéyaa Abraham-Joseph; Richard Zastenker; Gino Nano; Pontus Persson
- Producers: Liohn; Gino Nano; Pontus Persson; Eight8; Harry Beech; Jonny Leslie

Central Cee singles chronology
"One by One" (2024)	"GBP" (2025)	"Which One" (2025)

21 Savage singles chronology
"Prove It" (2024)	"GBP" (2025)

Music video
- "GBP" on YouTube

"GBP" is a song by British rappers Central Cee featuring 21 Savage, released on January 17, 2025 as the third single from the former's debut studio album, Can't Rush Greatness (2025). It was produced by Liohn, Gino Nano, Pontus Persson, Eight8, Harry Beech and Jonny

== Composition and lyrics ==
"GBP" blends elements of UK and US rap, primarily UK drill and US trap. The production consists of synths, drums and a vocal sample. The song opens with a snippet of dialogue by rapper Cam'ron's character from the 2002 film Paid In Full (which Central Cee references later on): "Yo, come on, Mitch, you know I gotta go / Bring your motherfuckin' ass". Central Cee raps about rising to fame from his humble beginnings and the struggles of street life. In addition, he discusses how his life would have been different in the United States, with respect to gun laws ("If it weren't the UK, would've had a AK-47 with a hundred rounds"), UK streetwear ("Red carpet in my trackie and Air Max / They want a boy with a London style")—which references when he stepped on the red carpet in a tracksuit at The Fashion Awards in 2023—and money ("We ain't got generational wealth, got a couple of mill' for my unborn child / If I pay a man a hundred thousand pound, I can get man bun right in front of a crowd, uh")—after which 21 Savage explains that the U.S. dollar is not worth as much as the British pound ("That's GBP, the price go up if it's USD / Better watch your words, I'll get you X'd 'bout the shit you tweet (On God)")—in the chorus, as well as other crime-related topics in the first verse ("If I lived in Harlem, I would've been Mitch, them man would've been like Ace and snitched / If it was Oakland, I would've been a pimp / If it was 1930, North Carolina, I would've been Frank with the mink"). Central Cee details staying true to his roots in the streets, declaring "If it weren't UK, would have had an AK, gang outside with a samurai sword". In the second verse, 21 Savage references the Premier League in the opening lines and shares his struggles as a rapper, including dealing with Internet feuds and women looking for a committed relationship with him. Nevertheless, he states he is willing to buy luxury items for women in his life.

== Critical reception ==
The song was well-received by music critics. Elias Andrews of HotNewHipHop commented the song "does an excellent job of fusing drill and trap in an organic way. Both rappers sound at home on the beat, and do their thing while complimenting each other's style." He added, "The two rappers swap verses after small bursts of bars. Central Cee raps the first 30 seconds of the song, then hands it off to 21 Savage. The Atlanta hitmaker spits for 15 more seconds before giving it back to Cee. Odd, but it works. Both men bring the bars. The beat is also elite, with a vocal sample being distorted to varying effects throughout. This is an improvement over Central Cee's collab with Lil Baby, 'Band4Band.'" Sophie Caraan of Hypebeast wrote "21 complements Cee with his own gritty lines, aiding the track's strong storytelling aspect. The duo's musical chemistry is, frankly, undeniable, and the mix of their styles deliver what could be one of the strongest tracks off the new album." Tom Breihan of Stereogum wrote "Central Cee and 21 Savage have extremely different rap styles, but they sound really good together as their voices bounce back and forth across this beat."

== Music video ==
An official music video premiered alongside the single. Directed by Cole Bennett and filmed in Atlanta, it largely features British culture and red tones characteristic of the U.K. flag; Central Cee and 21 Savage rap in front of a giant Union Jack. Guns and stunt driving are shown in other scenes. Central Cee waves a Brit Awards trophy on a CCTV screen and rides in the backseat of a Pontiac as he does doughnuts in a parking lot. The clip also finds ninjas in hoods and ski masks duelling with swords.

== Charts ==
Chart performance for "GBP"
Chart (2025)	Peak position
Australia (ARIA)	36
Austria (Ö3 Austria Top 40)	52
Canada Hot 100 (Billboard)	28
Czech Republic Singles Digital (ČNS IFPI)	92
Germany (GfK)	80
Global 200 (Billboard)	43
Greece International (IFPI)	6
Iceland (Tónlistinn)	24
Ireland (IRMA)	26
Luxembourg (Billboard)	13
Netherlands (Single Top 100)	49
New Zealand (Recorded Music NZ)	20
Nigeria (TurnTable Top 100)	47
Poland (Polish Streaming Top 100)	92
Slovakia Singles Digital (ČNS IFPI)	51
Sweden (Sverigetopplistan)	89
Switzerland (Schweizer Hitparade)	18
UK Singles (Official Charts)	6
UK Hip Hop/R&B (Official Charts)	1
US Billboard Hot 100	81
US Hot R&B/Hip-Hop Songs (Billboard)	21

== Certifications ==
Certifications for "GBP"
Region	Certification	Certified units/sales
Canada (Music Canada)	Gold	40,000^{‡}
New Zealand (RMNZ)	Gold	15,000^{‡}
United Kingdom (BPI)	Silver	200,000^{‡}
^{‡} Sales+streaming figures based on certification alone.
