= No More Leaks =

EP by Central Cee
- Released: 14 October 2022
- Recorded: 20 January – 1 May 2022
- Genre: UK drill
- Length: 10:14
- Label: Self-released
- Producer: Young Chencs; SHK; Milksh4kevf; Lekaa Beats

Central Cee chronology
23 (2022)	No More Leaks (2022)	Split Decision (2023)

Singles from No More Leaks
- 1. "One Up" Released: 13 October 2022

No More Leaks is the fourth extended play by British rapper Central Cee. It was released on 14 October 2022 with no prior announcement. It was preceded by its lead single "One Up", which was released the day before. The EP was released after songs on the project leaked.

== Track listing ==
No More Leaks track listing
No.	Title	Writer(s)	Producer(s)	Length
1.	"Chapters"	Oakley Caesar-Su; SHK	Milksh4kevf; SHK	1:54
2.	"Bumpy Johnson"	Oakley Caesar-Su; Young Chencs	Young Chencs	2:41
3.	"One Up"	Oakley Caesar-Su; Lekaa Beats	Lekaa Beats	2:40
4.	"Crypto Price"	Oakley Caesar-Su; Young Chencs	Young Chencs	2:58
Total length:				10:14
