= All Roads Lead Home (EP) =

EP by Central Cee
- Released: 27 March 2026
- Genres: UK hip-hop; UK drill
- Length: 17:18
- Labels: Columbia; CC4L

Central Cee chronology
| Can't Rush Greatness (2025) | All Roads Lead Home (2026) |

Singles from All Roads Lead Home
- 1. "Iceman Freestyle" Released: 12 February 2026; 2. "Slaughter" Released: 13 February 2026

All Roads Lead Home is the fifth solo extended play and sixth overall by British rapper Central Cee. It was released on 27 March 2026 through CC4L and Columbia Records, and features guest appearances from J Hus and A2 Anti.

== Background and release ==
The EP was announced following the release of the track "Iceman Freestyle" on 12 February 2026, which was previewed in late 2025 during Drake's livestream teasing his album Iceman. On 13 February the track "Slaughter" with J Hus released. Presaves on streaming services also became available.

While the original release date was set for 19 March to coincide with the end of Ramadan, the EP was delayed by one week.

== Track listing ==
All Roads Lead Home track listing
| No. | Title | Writer(s) | Producer(s) | Length |
|---|---|---|---|---|
| 1. | "Iceman Freestyle" | Oakley Caesar-Su; Harley Arsenault; Christopher Richardson; Thomas Moore; Remo Giazotto; Tomaso Albinoni | Chris Rich | 3:06 |
| 2. | "Slaughter" | Caesar-Su; Momodou Jallow; Karan Behl; Ayodele Oyadare; Alexander Bardia Henderson; Andrey Scotton | Fumes Beats; Io; Ohnine; Yjay; Aaronorage | 2:18 |
| 3. | "Wagwan" | Caesar-Su; Angus Barclay; Lukas Leth | Gusto; LukasBL | 2:07 |
| 4. | "Feelings" | Caesar-Su | Mason Beats; Macshooter49 | 2:50 |
| 5. | "DC10" | Caesar-Su; Nathan Odueyingbo; Joseph Riley | Nathaniel London; BabyCashy | 2:09 |
| 6. | "Maka" | Caesar-Su; Shairiq Noel; Jake Fridkis; Spencer Harris; Samuel Martin Demits | Jake Fridkis; Einer Bankz; Sam Beats | 2:45 |
| 7. | "Y Fi Dat" | Caesar-Su; Arsenault; Richardson | Harley Arsenault; Pending; Chris Rich | 2:03 |
| Total length: | | | | 17:18 |

== Charts ==
Chart performance for All Roads Lead Home
| Chart (2026) | Peak position |
|---|---|
| Australian Albums (ARIA) | 26 |
| Australian Hip Hop/R&B Albums (ARIA) | 5 |
| Austrian Albums (Ö3 Austria) | 67 |
| Belgian Albums (Ultratop Flanders) | 127 |
| Canadian Albums (Billboard) | 85 |
| Irish Albums (IRMA) | 98 |
| Lithuanian Albums (AGATA) | 63 |
| New Zealand Albums (RMNZ) | 22 |
| Nigerian Albums (TurnTable) | 40 |
| Portuguese Albums (AFP) | 10 |
| Swiss Albums (Schweizer Hitparade) | 27 |
| UK Albums (Official Charts) | 34 |
