= Wild West (mixtape) =

Mixtape by Central Cee
- Released: 12 March 2021
- Genre: UK drill
- Length: 38:26
- Label: Live Yours / ADA
- Producer: Young Chencs; Byrd; JB Made It; Itchy; Elevated; Frosty Beats; Scott Styles; Scott Supreme; Mokuba; Nastylgia; Sykes; Levi Lennox; Chucks; Fwdslxsh; Hargo; Bkay; Lovelife; 416

Central Cee chronology
Wild West (2021)	23 (2022)

Singles from Wild West
- 1. "Day in the Life" Released: 15 June 2020; 2. "Loading" Released: 22 October 2020; 3. "Pinging (6 Figures)" Released: 14 January 2021; 4. "Commitment Issues" Released: 11 February 2021; 5. "6 For 6" Released: 11 March 2021

Wild West is the debut mixtape by British rapper and songwriter Central Cee. It was released independently on 12 March 2021.

== Critical reception ==
Professional ratings
Review scores
Source	Rating
Clash	8/10
Financial Times	2/5 stars
The Guardian	3/5 stars
NME	4/5 stars

Elle Evans of Clash described Central Cee as a "soon-to-be rap-star" and stated that the mixtape "handed over a slew of top-notch tracks", while NME critic Nicolas-Tyrell Scott said that Wild West gives "a tantalising glimpse at drill's future". Will Pritchard of The Guardian opined that Cee is a "golden egg in the UK's blossoming drill scene", and described the mixtape as "punchy".

== Commercial performance ==
Wild West debuted at number two on the UK Albums Chart, earning 15,105 album-equivalent units in its first week, of which 6,302 copies were in physical CD format. It was also the most streamed album of the week. The mixtape also charted in Ireland, where it peaked at number three, and Australia, where it debuted and peaked at number 37 on the ARIA Albums Chart. As of September 2021, the album has successfully reached 98,000 in sales.

== Track listing ==
Wild West track listing
No.	Title	Length
1.	"6 for 6"	2:28
2.	"Fraud"	2:31
3.	"Pinging (6 Figures)"	2:45
4.	"The Bag"	2:53
5.	"Day in the Life"	3:08
6.	"Dun Deal"	2:41
7.	"Commitment Issues"	2:30
8.	"Sex Money Drugs"	2:34
9.	"Ruby"	3:25
10.	"Hate It or Luv It"	2:32
11.	"Xmas Eve"	2:28
12.	"Loading"	2:53
13.	"Tension"	3:08
14.	"Gangbiz"	2:30
Total length:		38:26

== Charts ==
=== Weekly charts ===
Weekly chart performance for Wild West
Chart (2021)	Peak position
Australian Albums (ARIA)	37
Belgian Albums (Ultratop Flanders)	86
Belgian Albums (Ultratop Wallonia)	88
Dutch Albums (Album Top 100)	42
French Albums (SNEP)	162
Irish Albums (OCC)	3
Italian Albums (FIMI)	82
Lithuanian Albums (AGATA)	98
Norwegian Albums (VG-lista)	39
Scottish Albums (OCC)	10
UK Albums (OCC)	2
UK R&B Albums (OCC)	1

=== Year-end charts ===
Year-end chart performance for Wild West
Chart (2021)	Position
UK Albums (OCC)	47

== Certifications ==
Certifications for Wild West
Region	Certification	Certified units/sales
Denmark (IFPI Danmark)	Gold	10,000^{‡}
France (SNEP)	Gold	50,000^{‡}
United Kingdom (BPI)	Gold	100,000^{‡}
^{‡} Sales+streaming figures based on certification alone.
