= One Up (song) =

2022 single by Central Cee

Single by Central Cee

from the EP No More Leaks
- Released: 13 October 2022
- Genre: UK drill
- Length: 2:40
- Label: Self-released
- Songwriters: Oakley Caesar-Su; Lekaa Beats
- Producer: Lekaa Beats

Central Cee singles chronology
"LA Leakers Freestyle" (2022)	"One Up" (2022)	"Let Go" (2022)

Audio video
- "One Up" on YouTube

"One Up" is a song by British rapper and songwriter Central Cee. It was released on 13 October 2022 as the lead single from his EP, No More Leaks.

== Music video ==
The video, directed by Suave, shows Central Cee driving around London and stopping at the studio.

== Charts ==
Weekly chart performance for "One Up"
Chart (2022)	Peak position
Australia (ARIA)	92
Canada (Canadian Hot 100)	100
France (SNEP)	138
Global Excl. US (Billboard)	183
Ireland (IRMA)	27
Netherlands (Single Top 100)	72
Portugal (AFP)	97
Switzerland (Schweizer Hitparade)	61
UK Singles (OCC)	17
UK Indie (OCC)	1
UK Hip Hop/R&B (OCC)	7

== Certifications ==
Certifications for "One Up"
Region	Certification	Certified units/sales
New Zealand (RMNZ)	Gold	15,000^{‡}
United Kingdom (BPI)	Silver	200,000^{‡}
^{‡} Sales+streaming figures based on certification alone.
