= On the Radar Freestyle =

Single by Drake and Central Cee
- Released: July 21, 2023
- Recorded: July 2023
- Genre: UK drill
- Length: 4:35
- Label: OVO
- Songwriters: Aubrey Graham; Oakley Caesar-Su; Dalvin DeGrate; Harley Arsenault; Kaushik Barua
- Producers: Arsenault; Kid Masterpiece

Drake singles chronology
"Oh U Went" (2023)	"On the Radar Freestyle" (2023)	"Meltdown" (2023)

Central Cee singles chronology
"Sprinter" (2023)	"On the Radar Freestyle" (2023)	"Too Much" (2023)

Performance video
- "On the Radar Freestyle" on YouTube

"On the Radar Freestyle" is a song by Canadian rapper Drake and British rapper Central Cee. It premiered on On the Radar Radio as a freestyle rap for the radio show on July 21, 2023, and was released as a single on streaming services through OVO Sound four days later. The two artists wrote the song alongside DeVante Swing and with producers Harley Arsenault and Kid Masterpiece. It was recorded in New York when Drake was there for the It's All a Blur Tour, his co-headlining tour with Atlanta-based rapper 21 Savage.

== Composition and lyrics ==
On the song, Drake references love, acting in Degrassi: The Next Generation (2001), and fellow Canadian singer Justin Bieber and his hometown of Stratford in Ontario, Canada as he raps: "If I take flicks with the guys, I gotta put emojis over like three faces / 'Cause the feds can’t see those eyes / People I shouldn't be beside / When I was an actor, they would go to Stratford just to sell food on Bieber's side / Plenty reasons why I'm this way / My girl, that's just one reason why". He also references Julius Caesar and Jesus: "If Chubbs has on a Chanel side bag, you don't wanna see him reach inside / 'Cause we know some demon guys with jealous and evil eyes / You know that's how Jesus died, you know that's how Julius Caesar died / I bet they were decent guys; I swear they remind me of me sometimes". Central Cee references Opium Records and label signees Ken Carson and Destroy Lonely and sports teams Spartans W.F.C. and the Charlotte Hornets.

== Charts ==
Chart performance for "On the Radar Freestyle"
Chart (2023)	Peak position
Australia (ARIA)	89
Canada Hot 100 (Billboard)	45
Global 200 (Billboard)	106
New Zealand Hot Singles (RMNZ)	9
Ireland (IRMA)	42
Netherlands (Single Top 100)	87
Switzerland (Schweizer Hitparade)	74
UK Singles (Official Charts)	26
UK Hip Hop/R&B (Official Charts)	11
US Billboard Hot 100	80
US Hot R&B/Hip-Hop Songs (Billboard)	33
