= Obsessed with You =

2021 single by Central Cee

Single by Central Cee

from the album 23
- Released: 10 September 2021
- Recorded: 2021
- Genre: UK drill
- Length: 1:48
- Label: Self-released; Parlophone
- Songwriters: Oakley Neil Caesar-Su; Nastylgia; Victoria Walker; Alexander Crossan
- Producers: Nastylgia; Mura Masa; PinkPantheress

Central Cee singles chronology
"Little Bit of This" (2021)	"Obsessed with You" (2021)	"Daily Duppy" (2021)

Audio video
- "Obsessed with You" on YouTube

"Obsessed with You" is a song by British rapper and songwriter Central Cee. It was released on 10 September 2021 and reached number 4 in the United Kingdom, the first single from Central Cee's second mixtape 23. The song samples "Just for Me" by PinkPantheress.

== Charts ==
=== Weekly charts ===
Weekly chart performance for "Obsessed with You"
Chart (2021–2022)	Peak position
Australia (ARIA)	30
France (SNEP)	45
Ireland (IRMA)	16
Netherlands (Single Top 100)	56
New Zealand Hot Singles (RMNZ)	3
Portugal (AFP)	105
Sweden (Sverigetopplistan)	70
Switzerland (Schweizer Hitparade)	65
UK Singles (OCC)	4
UK Indie (OCC)	1
UK Hip Hop/R&B (OCC)	1

=== Year-end charts ===
Year-end chart performance for "Obsessed with You"
Chart (2021)	Position
UK Singles (OCC)	87

== Certifications ==
Certifications for "Obsessed with You"
Region	Certification	Certified units/sales
Australia (ARIA)	Platinum	70,000^{‡}
Canada (Music Canada)	Gold	40,000^{‡}
Denmark (IFPI Danmark)	Gold	45,000^{‡}
France (SNEP)	Platinum	200,000^{‡}
Italy (FIMI)	Gold	50,000^{‡}
Netherlands (NVPI)	Gold	40,000^{‡}
New Zealand (RMNZ)	Platinum	30,000^{‡}
Poland (ZPAV)	Gold	25,000^{‡}
Portugal (AFP)	Platinum	10,000^{‡}
Spain (PROMUSICAE)	Gold	30,000^{‡}
United Kingdom (BPI)	Platinum	600,000^{‡}
Streaming
Sweden (GLF)	Gold	4,000,000^{†}
^{‡} Sales+streaming figures based on certification alone.^{†} Streaming-only figures based on certification alone.
