= Band4Band =

Single by Central Cee and Lil Baby

from the album Can't Rush Greatness
- Released: 24 May 2024
- Recorded: 2023
- Genre: British hip hop; UK drill
- Length: 2:21
- Label: CC4L; Columbia
- Songwriters: Oakley Caesar-Su; Dominique Jones; Gennaro Frenken; Dennis Opoku; Ayrton Bagshaw
- Producers: geenaro; Ghana Beats

Central Cee singles chronology
"H.Y.B." (2024)	"Band4Band" (2024)	"Wave" (2024)

Lil Baby singles chronology
"CBFW" (2024)	"Band4Band" (2024)	"Splitz" (2024)

Music video
- "Band4Band" on YouTube

"Band4Band" is a song by British rapper Central Cee and American rapper Lil Baby. It was released through record labels CC4L and Columbia Records on 24 May 2024. The song was produced by Geenaro & Ghana Beats.

== Background ==
The song was initially previewed in late 2023 as a solo track from Cee, however, in a March 2024 Instagram story, it was confirmed that Central Cee and Lil Baby were working on a collaboration.

Central Cee announced the song on 22 May, noting it would be released the following day. On 23 May, he took to his story stating that the song would be released at 9 PM GMT.

== Composition ==
"Band4Band" is described as a fusion of Cench's distinct UK rap sound and Baby's signature style of Atlanta rap. The two's flows are referred to as a "fast-paced montage of the rappers flexing their wealth". The distinct UK drill beat is referred to as a "certified trunk rattler" by Billboard's Angel Diaz. Produced by Geenaro & Ghana Beats. The original sample was interpolated from Aasis Beats Looperman page.

== Music video ==
The Wowa-directed music video, released on 23 May, shows Central Cee and Lil Baby parade through London in several Lamborghini Urus', giving the two a "presidential" look. The video is described as "extravagant". The rappers are shown to showcase their luxurious lifestyle, showing off private jets, luxury vehicles, diamond jewels, and watches.

== Charts ==
=== Weekly charts ===
Weekly chart performance for "Band4Band"
Chart (2024–2025)	Peak position
Australia (ARIA)	9
Australia Hip Hop/R&B (ARIA)	3
Austria (Ö3 Austria Top 40)	14
Belgium (Ultratop 50 Flanders)	34
Canada Hot 100 (Billboard)	11
Czech Republic Singles Digital (ČNS IFPI)	23
Denmark (Tracklisten)	13
Finland (Suomen virallinen lista)	34
France (SNEP)	84
Germany (GfK)	20
Global 200 (Billboard)	12
Greece International (IFPI)	1
Hungary (Single Top 40)	28
Iceland (Tónlistinn)	8
Ireland (IRMA)	9
Israel (Mako Hitlist)	49
Italy (FIMI)	81
Latvia Streaming (LAIPA)	11
Lithuania (AGATA)	21
Luxembourg (Billboard)	2
Netherlands (Single Top 100)	14
New Zealand (Recorded Music NZ)	12
Nigeria (TurnTable Top 100)	23
Norway (VG-lista)	17
Poland (Polish Streaming Top 100)	28
Portugal (AFP)	11
Romania (Billboard)	22
Slovakia Singles Digital (ČNS IFPI)	10
South Africa Streaming (TOSAC)	7
Spain (PROMUSICAE)	90
Sweden (Sverigetopplistan)	19
Switzerland (Schweizer Hitparade)	4
United Arab Emirates (IFPI)	5
UK Singles (Official Charts)	3
UK Hip Hop/R&B (Official Charts)	1
US Billboard Hot 100	18
US Hot R&B/Hip-Hop Songs (Billboard)	6
US R&B/Hip-Hop Airplay (Billboard)	4
US Rhythmic Airplay (Billboard)	2

=== Year-end charts ===
Year-end chart performance for "Band4Band"
Chart (2024)	Position
Australia Hip Hop/R&B (ARIA)	24
Canada (Canadian Hot 100)	53
Global 200 (Billboard)	163
Switzerland (Schweizer Hitparade)	83
UK Singles (OCC)	72
US Hot R&B/Hip-Hop Songs (Billboard)	32
US Rhythmic (Billboard)	28

== Certifications ==
Certifications for "Band4Band"
Region	Certification	Certified units/sales
Belgium (BRMA)	Gold	20,000^{‡}
Canada (Music Canada)	3× Platinum	240,000^{‡}
Denmark (IFPI Danmark)	Gold	45,000^{‡}
France (SNEP)	Gold	100,000^{‡}
Hungary (MAHASZ)	Platinum	4,000^{‡}
Netherlands (NVPI)	Gold	46,500^{‡}
New Zealand (RMNZ)	Platinum	30,000^{‡}
Nigeria (TCSN)	Silver	25,000^{‡}
Norway (IFPI Norway)	Gold	30,000^{‡}
Poland (ZPAV)	Gold	25,000^{‡}
Portugal (AFP)	Gold	5,000^{‡}
Switzerland (IFPI Switzerland)	Gold	15,000^{‡}
United Kingdom (BPI)	Platinum	600,000^{‡}
United States (RIAA)	2× Platinum	2,000,000^{‡}
Streaming
Greece (IFPI Greece)	Platinum	2,000,000^{†}
^{‡} Sales+streaming figures based on certification alone.^{†} Streaming-only figures based on certification alone.
