= Sprinter (song) =

Single by Dave and Central Cee

from the EP Split Decision
- Released: 1 June 2023
- Recorded: 2023
- Genre: British hip hop; UK drill
- Length: 3:49
- Label: Neighbourhood; Live Yours
- Songwriters: Oakley Neil Caesar-Su; David Orobosa Omoregie; James Olaloye; Jo Caleb; Jonny Leslie
- Producers: Jonny Leslie; Phoebe Stephens; Jo Caleb; Santan; Jim Legxacy; TR; Kyle Evans

Dave singles chronology
"My 24th Birthday" (2022)	"Sprinter" (2023)	"Meridian" (2023)

Central Cee singles chronology
"Me & You" (2023)	"Sprinter" (2023)	"On the Radar Freestyle" (2023)

Music video
- "Sprinter" on YouTube

Sprinter is a song by British rappers Dave and Central Cee. The single was released 1 June 2023 through record labels Neighbourhood and Live Yours, and was included on the artists' collaborative EP Split Decision, released four days later. The song's instrumental has been characterized as a "guitar-led, subtle drill" beat with Latin influence.

Sprinter debuted at number one in the UK Singles Chart, becoming Dave's third number-one single and Central Cee's first. The single became the longest-running number-one rap song in the UK, holding the position for 10 weeks. It also topped the charts in Australia, Ireland, Luxembourg, New Zealand and Switzerland. Sprinter was ultimately the most streamed song on Spotify in the United Kingdom in 2023. By April 2024 it was the most streamed UK rap song of all time.

The work won the PRS for Music Most Performed Work Ivor Novello Award on Thursday 23 May 2024.

== Background ==
The song was first teased by Cee on his Instagram stories on 18 March 2023, revealing that Dave had just sent him an audio file. They were also spotted in the studio together on 10 May.

Sprinter marks only the second time the two have teamed up on a song, the last one being a remix of Spirit Bomb (2016) by AJ Tracey. Additionally, Dave helped produce the song End of the Beginning on the 23 mixtape in 2022.

Sprinter is in reference to a Mercedes-Benz Sprinter.

== Composition ==
Sprinter sees the rappers trading "laid-back" verses over a "Latin-tinged, summer-ready" beat characterised by "chopped-up acoustic guitars and wordless operatic vocals".

David Renshaw of The Fader thought the track was distinguished by "bright wordplay and good vibes", while the lyrics talk about the "age-old problem" of partying with too many girls that a whole van is needed to transport them. Robin Murray of Clash opined that the song "sits somewhere between drill and broader UK rap flavours" and allows the rappers "to do their thing".

== Music video ==
The music video, released on 2 June, switches between London and South France. Scenes in Monaco were filmed in late May 2023. The video features a cameo by Nigerian artist Slawn. The rappers are seen showcasing the perks of their lifestyle, showing off diamonds and other valuables. There are also women being shown in the music video.

== Commercial performance ==
Sprinter debuted at number one on the UK Singles Chart, marking the biggest opening week of the year. The track opened with 108,200 chart units in its first tracking week alongside 13.4 million streams, the biggest week of streams for a rap single ever in UK history. By December 2023, Sprinter had received over 500 million streams on Spotify.

The track peaked at number one in Australia after selling 13,000 units in its first tracking week. The track also peaked at number one in Ireland, Luxembourg, New Zealand and Switzerland. In the United Arab Emirates, the song peaked at number 11.

In the United States, the song peaked in the top ten of the Billboard Global 200 and the U.S. Bubbling Under Hot 100 chart. In Canada, Sprinter debuted at number five on the Canadian Hot 100 on 17 June 2023, becoming the highest peaking British hip hop single of all time, surpassing M.I.A.'s 2008 song, Paper Planes which reached number seven.

On the 6th of November 2025, Sprinter reached 1 billion streams, becoming the first UK Rap song to reach that milestone.

== Reception and legacy ==
The song was declared "song of the summer" for 2023 by UK Charts. In August 2023, a video of American rapper J. Cole rapping along to Sprinter at record producer T-Minus' wedding went viral on social media. Former U.S. President Barack Obama included the song on his annual playlist, which was released in December 2023. At the MOBO Awards 2024, Sprinter won the award for best song. At the 2024 Global Awards, Sprinter was nominated for Best Song.

== Charts ==
=== Weekly charts ===
Weekly chart performance for "Sprinter"
Chart (2023)	Peak position
Australia (ARIA)	1
Australia Hip Hop/R&B (ARIA)	1
Austria (Ö3 Austria Top 40)	5
Belgium (Ultratop 50 Flanders)	21
Belgium (Ultratop 50 Wallonia)	27
Canada Hot 100 (Billboard)	5
Croatia (Billboard)	16
Czech Republic Singles Digital (ČNS IFPI)	14
Denmark (Tracklisten)	2
Finland (Suomen virallinen lista)	11
France (SNEP)	28
Germany (GfK)	21
Global 200 (Billboard)	9
Hungary (Single Top 40)	11
Hungary (Stream Top 40)	19
Ireland (IRMA)	1
Italy (FIMI)	80
Latvia (LaIPA)	3
Lebanon Airplay (Lebanese Top 20)	9
Lithuania (AGATA)	5
Luxembourg (Billboard)	1
MENA (IFPI)	4
Netherlands (Dutch Top 40)	22
Netherlands (Single Top 100)	3
New Zealand (Recorded Music NZ)	1
Norway (VG-lista)	3
Poland (Polish Streaming Top 100)	33
Portugal (AFP)	4
Romania (Billboard)	22
Slovakia Singles Digital (ČNS IFPI)	4
South Africa Streaming (TOSAC)	2
Suriname (Nationale Top 40)	8
Sweden (Sverigetopplistan)	2
Switzerland (Schweizer Hitparade)	1
UAE (IFPI)	10
UK Singles (Official Charts)	1
UK Hip Hop/R&B (Official Charts)	1
US Bubbling Under Hot 100 (Billboard)	2
US Hot R&B/Hip-Hop Songs (Billboard)	29

=== Year-end charts ===
2023 year-end chart performance for "Sprinter"
Chart (2023)	Position
Australia (ARIA)	15
Austria (Ö3 Austria Top 40)	34
Belgium (Ultratop 50 Flanders)	92
Canada (Canadian Hot 100)	35
Denmark (Tracklisten)	18
Germany (Official German Charts)	73
Global 200 (Billboard)	98
Hungary (Single Top 40)	42
Iceland (Tónlistinn)	20
Netherlands (Single Top 100)	25
New Zealand (Recorded Music NZ)	11
Sweden (Sverigetopplistan)	22
Switzerland (Schweizer Hitparade)	12
UK Singles (OCC)	2
US Hot R&B/Hip-Hop Songs (Billboard)	96

2024 year-end chart performance for "Sprinter"
Chart (2024)	Position
Australia Hip Hop/R&B (ARIA)	25
UK Singles (OCC)	74

== Certifications ==
Certifications for "Sprinter"
Region	Certification	Certified units/sales
Australia (ARIA)	3× Platinum	210,000^{‡}
Belgium (BRMA)	Platinum	40,000^{‡}
Brazil (Pro-Música Brasil)	Platinum	40,000^{‡}
Canada (Music Canada)	4× Platinum	320,000^{‡}
Denmark (IFPI Danmark)	2× Platinum	180,000^{‡}
France (SNEP)	Platinum	200,000^{‡}
Germany (BVMI)	Gold	300,000^{‡}
Italy (FIMI)	Gold	50,000^{‡}
Netherlands (NVPI)	Platinum	93,000^{‡}
New Zealand (RMNZ)	4× Platinum	120,000^{‡}
Nigeria (TCSN)	Platinum	100,000^{‡}
Norway (IFPI Norway)	2× Platinum	120,000^{‡}
Poland (ZPAV)	Platinum	50,000^{‡}
Portugal (AFP)	2× Platinum	20,000^{‡}
South Africa (RISA)	2× Platinum	80,000^{‡}
Spain (Promusicae)	Gold	30,000^{‡}
United Kingdom (BPI)	3× Platinum	1,800,000^{‡}
United States (RIAA)	Platinum	1,000,000^{‡}
Streaming
Greece (IFPI Greece)	4× Platinum	8,000,000^{†}
Sweden (GLF)	2× Platinum	24,000,000^{†}
^{‡} Sales+streaming figures based on certification alone.^{†} Streaming-only figures based on certification alone.
