= Doja (Central Cee song) =

Single by Central Cee
- Released: July 21, 2022
- Genre: UK drill
- Length: 1:37
- Label: Self-released
- Songwriters: Oakley Caesar-Su; Eve Jeffers; Andre Young; Michael Elizondo; Scott Storch; Steven Jordan
- Producers: LiTek; WhyJay

Central Cee singles chronology
"Khabib" (2022)	"Doja" (2022)	"One Up" (2022)

Music video
- "Doja" on YouTube

"Doja" is a single by British rapper Central Cee, released on July 21, 2022. The song, produced by LiTek and WhyJay, samples Eve's 2001 song featuring Gwen Stefani, "Let Me Blow Ya Mind". It went viral on TikTok for its lyrics, including a reference to its namesake, American rapper and singer Doja Cat.

"Doja" debuted at number two on the UK Singles Chart and number one in New Zealand and Greece. Its music video was the first by a British artist to be directed by Cole Bennett of music video production company Lyrical Lemonade.

== Lyrics and composition ==
"Doja" received viral attention on TikTok for its lyrical references to American rapper and singer Doja Cat and for its repeated line "How can I be homophobic? My bitch is gay". It samples the melody from Eve's "Let Me Blow Ya Mind" throughout the entire song.

== Reception ==
David Renshaw of The Fader described the feel of the track as "more tactical than exploitative", which he wrote "is what (just about) saves the song from crashing into offensive territory". Renshaw also opined that the song touches on the "homoerotic undertones of gang culture" although finding that Central Cee does not explore these "observations" beyond mere mentions and that it "has achieved its express goal of grabbing as many eyeballs as possible".

== Music video ==
The song was released alongside its music video, which was directed by Cole Bennett.

== Charts ==
=== Weekly charts ===
Weekly chart performance for "Doja"
Chart (2022)	Peak position
Australia (ARIA)	3
Austria (Ö3 Austria Top 40)	20
Belgium (Ultratop 50 Flanders)	44
Belgium (Ultratop 50 Wallonia)	21
Canada (Canadian Hot 100)	16
Croatia (Billboard)	18
Czech Republic Singles Digital (ČNS IFPI)	12
Denmark (Tracklisten)	6
France (SNEP)	7
Germany (GfK)	19
Global 200 (Billboard)	19
Greece International (IFPI)	1
Hungary (Stream Top 40)	9
Iceland (Tónlistinn)	7
Ireland (IRMA)	5
Italy (FIMI)	51
Lithuania (AGATA)	13
Luxembourg (Billboard)	2
Netherlands (Single Top 100)	5
New Zealand (Recorded Music NZ)	1
Norway (VG-lista)	13
Portugal (AFP)	7
Slovakia (Singles Digitál Top 100)	11
South Africa Streaming (TOSAC)	33
Sweden (Sverigetopplistan)	5
Switzerland (Schweizer Hitparade)	3
UK Singles (OCC)	2
UK Hip Hop/R&B (OCC)	1
UK Indie (OCC)	1
US Bubbling Under Hot 100 Singles (Billboard)	12
US Hot R&B/Hip-Hop Songs (Billboard)	36
US Rhythmic (Billboard)	22

=== Year-end charts ===
2022 year-end chart performance for "Doja"
Chart (2022)	Position
Australia (ARIA)	65
Belgium (Ultratop Flanders)	143
Belgium (Ultratop Wallonia)	92
Canada (Canadian Hot 100)	85
Denmark (Tracklisten)	91
France (SNEP)	65
Germany (Official German Charts)	88
Global 200 (Billboard)	177
Hungary (Stream Top 40)	65
Netherlands (Single Top 100)	62
Switzerland (Schweizer Hitparade)	49
UK Singles (OCC)	72

== Certifications ==
Certifications for "Doja"
Region	Certification	Certified units/sales
Australia (ARIA)	2× Platinum	140,000^{‡}
Austria (IFPI Austria)	Platinum	30,000^{‡}
Belgium (BRMA)	Gold	20,000^{‡}
Canada (Music Canada)	2× Platinum	160,000^{‡}
Denmark (IFPI Danmark)	Platinum	90,000^{‡}
France (SNEP)	Diamond	333,333^{‡}
Italy (FIMI)	Platinum	100,000^{‡}
Netherlands (NVPI)	Gold	40,000^{‡}
New Zealand (RMNZ)	2× Platinum	60,000^{‡}
Poland (ZPAV)	Platinum	50,000^{‡}
Portugal (AFP)	2× Platinum	20,000^{‡}
Spain (Promusicae)	Platinum	60,000^{‡}
Switzerland (IFPI Switzerland)	Platinum	20,000^{‡}
United Kingdom (BPI)	Platinum	600,000^{‡}
United States (RIAA)	Platinum	1,000,000^{‡}
Streaming
Greece (IFPI Greece)	2× Platinum	4,000,000^{†}
Sweden (GLF)	Platinum	8,000,000^{†}
^{‡} Sales+streaming figures based on certification alone.^{†} Streaming-only figures based on certification alone.
