= 23 (mixtape) =

Mixtape by Central Cee
- Released: 25 February 2022
- Genre: UK drill
- Length: 40:18
- Label: ADA
- Producers: Young Chencs; 3Lackondabeat; AyeTM; Chris Rich; Chucks; Dan Diggas; Flem; BKH Beats; Joe Stanley; Levi Lennox; Londnblue; Lovelife; Mura Masa; Nastylgia; Nko; Nick French; PinkPantheress; Roddy Beatz; Santan Dave

Central Cee chronology
Wild West (2021)	23 (2022)	No More Leaks (2022)

Singles from 23
- 1. "Obsessed with You" Released: 10 September 2021; 2. "Retail Therapy" Released: 6 January 2022; 3. "Cold Shoulder" Released: 27 January 2022; 4. "Khabib" Released: 10 February 2022

23 is the second mixtape by British rapper and songwriter Central Cee, released independently on 24 February 2022. It was preceded by the release of the singles "Obsessed with You", "Retail Therapy", "Cold Shoulder" and "Khabib". On 4 March 2022, it debuted at number one on the UK Albums Chart. It features guest appearances from his little brother, credited as Lil Bro, as well as Rondodasosa, Baby Gang, A2anti, Morad, Beny Jr, Ashe 22, and Freeze Corleone, all on the same track "Eurovision".

== Critical reception ==
Professional ratings
Aggregate scores
Source	Rating
Metacritic	80/100
Review scores
Source	Rating
Clash	8/10
DIY	3.5/5 stars
Evening Standard	4/5 stars
The Guardian	4/5 stars
The Line of Best Fit	7/10
Loud and Quiet	8/10
NME	4/5 stars

PJ Somervelle of The Line of Best Fit called the mixtape's "subject matter and approach [...] largely consistent with Wild West", summarising it as "rapid bursts of tracks, many lasting only a couple of minutes [...], it's clear that this is fast music for the TikTok/streaming generation". Alexis Petridis of The Guardian complimented Central Cee's "powerful flow" and ability to "turn a phrase", as well as "how good [he] is at the business of making records, not just writing" with "really strong musical ideas on display". Reviewing the album for the Evening Standard, David Smyth found the mixtape to have the "murky, rumbling bass of drill music" but that Central Cee's "crisp, rhythmic lyrics are less dense with slang than the standards of the genre and he's more likely to brag about a vibrant sex life than a violent past".

== Track listing ==
23 track listing
No.	Title	Writer(s)	Length
1.	"Khabib"	Oakley Caesar-Su; Ted Gitagama	3:18
2.	"Straight Back to It"	Caesar-Su; Roddy McAuley; Valentino Salvi	3:16
3.	"Ungrateful"	Caesar-Su; Levi Lennox	2:53
4.	"Bunda"	Caesar-Su; Nicholas French; Salvi	1:51
5.	"Retail Therapy"	Caesar-Su; Emmanuel Oparah; Doug Edwards; Thomas Richardson; Salvi	2:55
6.	"Eurovision" (featuring Rondodasosa, Baby Gang, A2anti, Morad, Beny Jr, Ashe 22, and Freeze Corleone)	Caesar-Su; Mattia Barbieri; Morad el Horami; Joseph Doumbe; Hamza Khadraoui; Nicolas De Benedetto; Zaccaria Mohuib; Wesley Bishop; Mohamed El Rifi Ben Yechou; Issa Diakhate; Salvi	4:03
7.	"Cold Shoulder"	Caesar-Su; Salvi	3:12
8.	"Mrs"	Caesar-Su; Christopher Richardson; Joe Stanley; Sterling Van Reynolds; Salvi	2:28
9.	"Air Bnb"	Caesar-Su; Salvi; McAuley; Hako Yamasaki	2:18
10.	"No Pain"	Caesar-Su; Thomas Moore; Jacob Colcombe; C. Richardson	1:34
11.	"Terminal 5"	Caesar-Su; Salvi	1:36
12.	"Obsessed with You"	Caesar-Su; Alexander Crossan; Victoria Walker; Oparah	1:48
13.	"8 Ball"	Caesar-Su; Conor Mulcahy	2:43
14.	"Lil Bro" (featuring Lil Bro)	Caesar-Su; Mulcahy; Daniel Adekugbe	3:09
15.	"End of the Beginning"	Caesar-Su; Salvi; C. Richardson; David Omoregie	3:14
Total length:			40:18

== Charts ==
=== Weekly charts ===
Weekly chart performance for 23
Chart (2022)	Peak position
Australian Albums (ARIA)	6
Austrian Albums (Ö3 Austria)	22
Belgian Albums (Ultratop Flanders)	19
Belgian Albums (Ultratop Wallonia)	5
Canadian Albums (Billboard)	32
Dutch Albums (Album Top 100)	6
French Albums (SNEP)	9
German Albums (Offizielle Top 100)	57
Irish Albums (Official Charts)	3
Italian Albums (FIMI)	19
Lithuanian Albums (AGATA)	79
New Zealand Albums (RMNZ)	14
Scottish Albums (Official Charts)	3
Spanish Albums (Promusicae)	15
Swiss Albums (Schweizer Hitparade)	11
UK Albums (Official Charts)	1
UK Independent Albums (Official Charts)	1
UK R&B Albums (Official Charts)	1

=== Year-end charts ===
Year-end chart performance for 23
Chart (2022)	Position
Belgian Albums (Ultratop Flanders)	199
Belgian Albums (Ultratop Wallonia)	157
UK Albums (OCC)	49

== Certifications ==
Certifications for 23
Region	Certification	Certified units/sales
New Zealand (RMNZ)	Gold	7,500^{‡}
United Kingdom (BPI)	Gold	100,000^{‡}
^{‡} Sales+streaming figures based on certification alone.
