= Central Cee =

British rapper (born 1998)

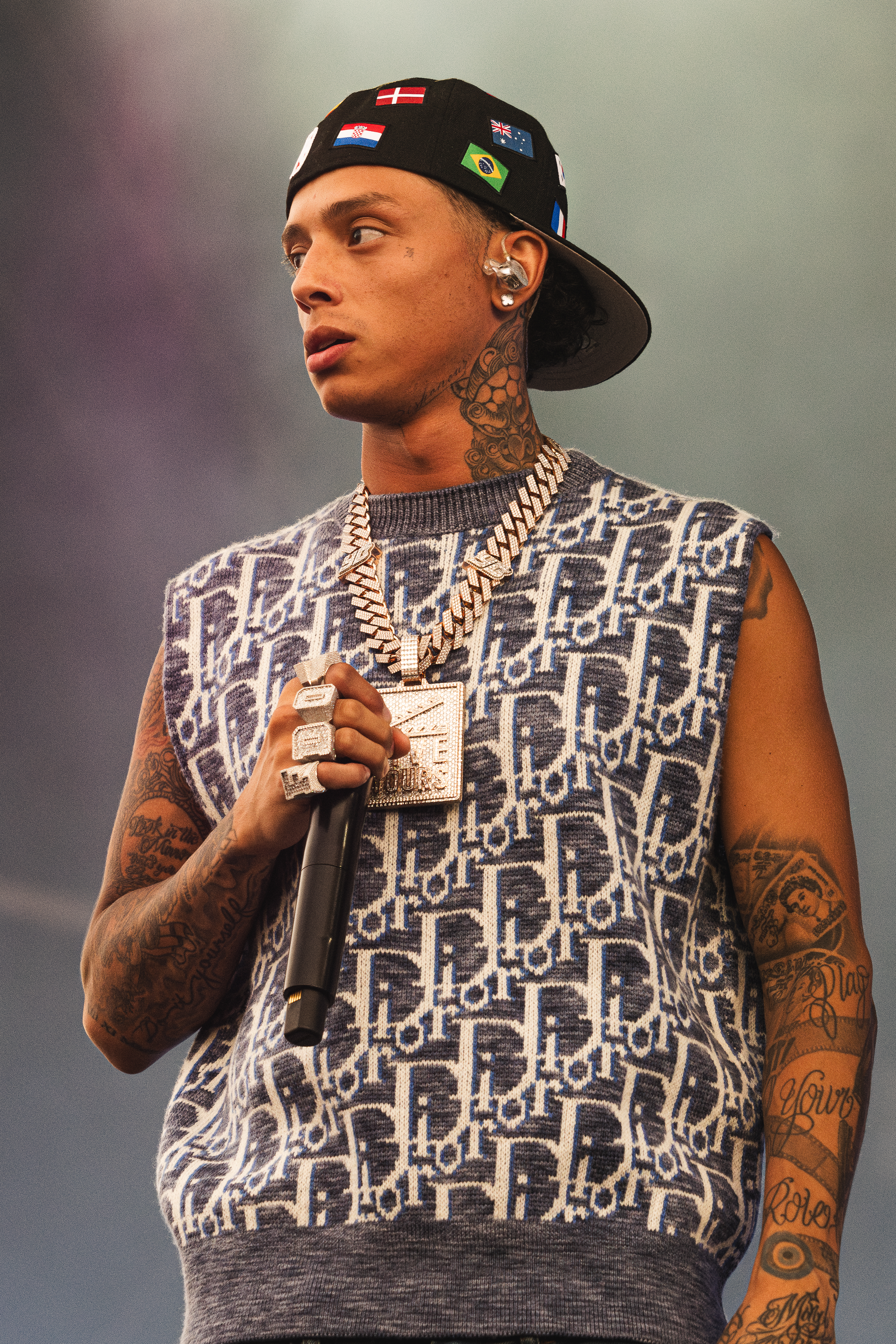
- Central Cee in 2023

Background information
- Also known as: Cench
- Born: Oakley Neil Caesar-Su; 4 June 1998 (age 28); Notting Hill, London, England
- Origin: Shepherd's Bush, London, England
- Genres: UK rap; trap; UK drill
- Occupations: Rapper; singer; songwriter
- Works: Discography
- Years active: 2014–present
- Labels: CC4L; Columbia; Live Yours; ADA
- Website: centralcee.com

Oakley Neil Caesar-Su (born 4 June 1998), known professionally as Central Cee, is a British rapper from Shepherd's Bush, London. Regarded as a leading figure in UK rap, he rose to prominence in 2020 with the release of his drill singles "Day in the Life" and "Loading". His first mixtape, Wild West (2021), debuted at number two on the UK Albums Chart, while his second, 23 (2022), debuted atop the chart.

Central Cee achieved further success with his 2022 single "Doja", which peaked at number two on the UK Singles Chart and became the then-most-streamed UK rap song on Spotify. In June 2023, he released the single "Sprinter" (with Dave), which became his first UK number-one song and preceded their collaborative EP, Split Decision (2023). The song also became the longest-running number-one rap song in the UK, holding the position for ten weeks. In April 2024, it became the most streamed UK rap song of all time, surpassing "Doja". That May, Central Cee released the single "Band4Band" (with Lil Baby), which became the highest-charting UK rap song on the Billboard Hot 100, peaking at number 18, as well as number 3 in his home country.

He signed with Columbia Records to release his debut studio album, Can't Rush Greatness (2025), which became his second number one on the UK Albums Chart. It also debuted at number nine on the Billboard 200, becoming the first top-ten UK rap album in US.

== Early life ==
Oakley Neil Caesar-Su was born on 4 June 1998 in Ladbroke Grove, London to an English mother and a father of Guyanese and Chinese ancestry. His mother Rachel Caesar met his father at age 15 and began dating him against her parents' wishes, subsequently getting cut off financially. When he was seven, his parents separated and he began living with his mother and two younger brothers in Shepherd's Bush. He has an additional half-brother. One of his brothers is Juke Caesar, who appeared on the 23 mixtape under the name "Lil Bro". As a child, Central Cee would write poetry and raps, which he would then show to his mother, a social worker.

When Central Cee visited his father, he would be shown American hip-hop. He would also be exposed to reggae and dancehall when he attended Notting Hill Carnival. Central Cee has stated that he kept to himself in school, but would occasionally misbehave and lose his temper. He went to the same school as rapper Digga D, being two years his senior. Central Cee left school at age 16.

Central Cee became enamoured with pursuing music as a career after a friend took him to a music studio near Wandsworth Bridge at age 14. During his teenage years, he worked at a shoe store for three weeks before finding out his wage and quitting. He eventually turned to selling drugs to earn money, stating, "When you're coming from where I'm coming from, everybody from all walks of life, nine times out of ten, they had to do that. It's like learning to ride a bike."

== Career ==
=== 2014–2019: Career beginnings ===
Initially inspired by Chip, Bow Wow, and Fugative, who gained fame as teenagers, Central Cee made an early public appearance on a now-deleted episode of Charlie Sloth's Fire in the Streets series in 2014, where he adopted the rapper name "Central Cee" (first listed as Central C). His first song appearance was on the "Ain't On Nuttin Remix" alongside J Hus and more in January 2015. He released his "StreetHeat Freestyle" in February of the same year. In 2015, Central Cee appeared on the music platform BL@CKBOX and performed verses to Tupac instrumentals alongside MoWest. At the age of 17, he threw his first headline show at Hoxton Square Bar & Kitchen, renting the venue for £500 and making £2,500 in profit. Six months later, he performed at the venue once again, describing it as "just the same as the first time", leading to a lack of motivation in his career. In February 2016, he was featured alongside Dave and others on the remix to the song "Spirit Bomb" by AJ Tracey. He later released the single "Pull Up" in August 2016. Central Cee released his first projects, the EP 17, and the now-deleted EPs Nostalgia and CS Vol. 1 in 2017. His "Next Up?" freestyle was released in October 2019, following a number of singles that released that year.

=== 2020–2023: Wild West, 23, and Split Decision ===
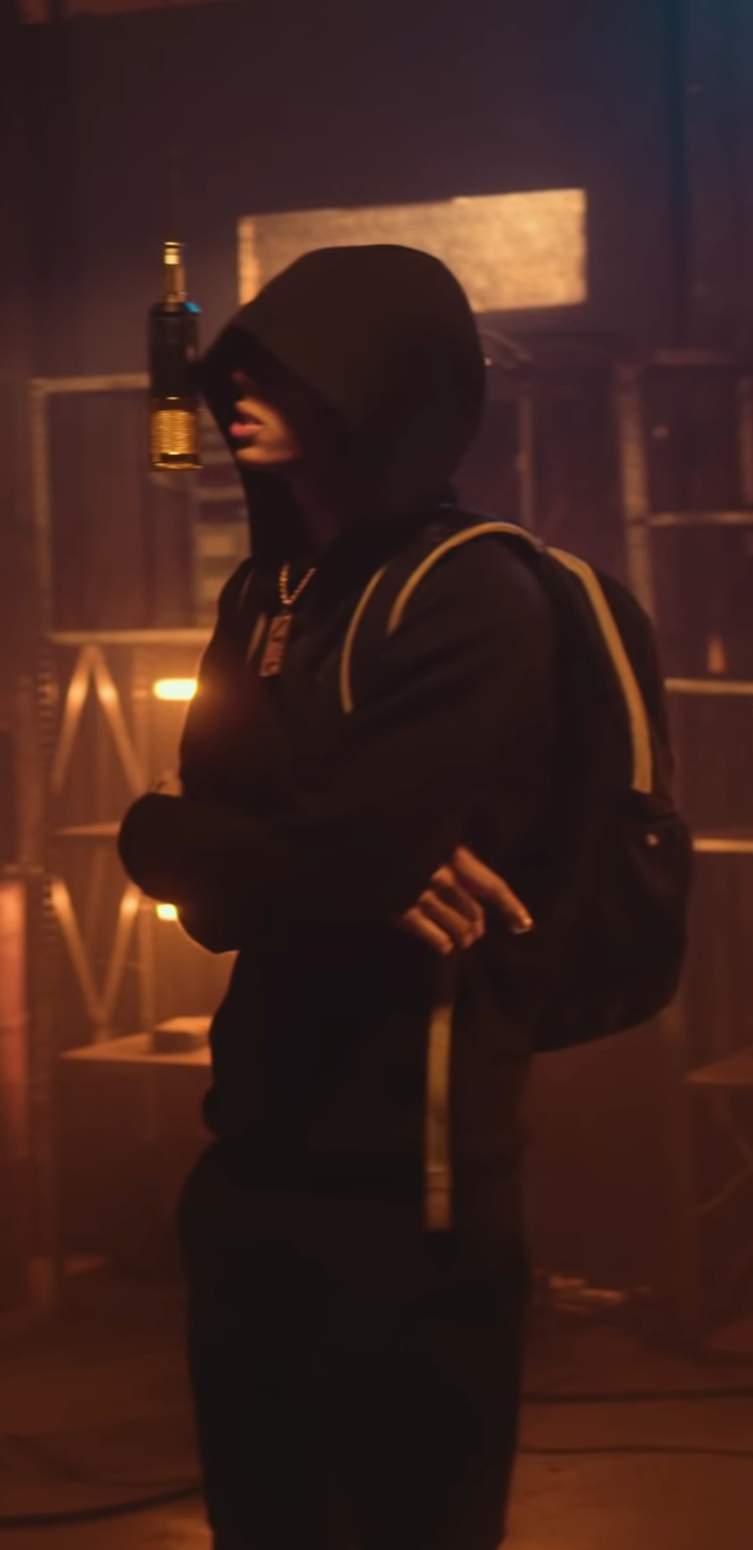
Central Cee performing his “Mad About Bars” freestyle in 2020

Central Cee met his future manager YBeeez in 2019, who encouraged him to pursue music further. After switching from auto-tuned hip-hop to a style similar to UK drill, he released his breakout single "Day in the Life" on 14 June 2020. He followed it up with "Molly" in July, and achieved further success with the single "Loading", released on 22 October 2020. The music videos for the three tracks were released by GRM Daily. "Loading" and February 2021's "Commitment Issues" both reached the top 20 on the UK Singles Chart. Central Cee self-released his debut mixtape Wild West in March 2021, which debuted at number two on the UK Albums Chart and number one on the UK R&B Albums Chart.

In September 2021, the single "Obsessed with You" reached number four on the UK Singles Chart, and would become the lead single to his second mixtape, 23, announced in November 2021. Central Cee's Daily Duppy was released on Christmas of 2021. The second and third singles from the mixtape, "Retail Therapy" and "Cold Shoulder", were released on 6 and 27 January 2022. On 25 February 2022, 23 was released and became his first number one on the UK Albums Chart.

Following previews at concerts and on social media, his single "Doja" released on 21 July 2022 alongside a music video directed by Cole Bennett. It became his highest charting song of his career, debuting at number two on the UK Singles Chart. The song also reached number 12 on the US Bubbling Under Hot 100 Chart. On 14 October 2022, Central Cee surprise released his EP No More Leaks, which was supported by the single "One Up" which released the day before. On 16 December 2022, he released the single "Let Go", which samples the Passenger single "Let Her Go" and peaked at number six on the UK Singles Chart. In 2022, Central Cee became the first UK rapper to achieve 1 billion Spotify streams in a single year. On 9 February 2023, he released the single "Me & You".

On 1 June 2023, Central Cee and Dave released the joint single "Sprinter". It was the lead single from their collaborative EP Split Decision, which was surprise-released on 4 June. "Sprinter" became his first number-one single, and broke the record for the biggest streaming week for a rap song in UK history. The single also broke the record for the longest running number-one rap single in the UK. In late June, Central Cee appeared on XXL's 2023 Freshman Class. Days later, it was announced that he had signed to Columbia Records. On 21 July, Central Cee released his "On the Radar Freestyle" with Drake. The track debuted at number 80 on the Billboard Hot 100, becoming his first song to reach the chart. On 20 October, he was featured on the song "Too Much" alongside Australian rapper The Kid Laroi and Korean pop star Jungkook. On 21 December 2023, Central Cee released the single "Entrapreneur".

=== 2024–present: Can't Rush Greatness and All Roads Lead Home ===
On 11 February 2024, Central Cee released the single "I Will". On 5 April 2024, he appeared on J. Cole's surprise mixtape Might Delete Later on the track "H.Y.B" alongside Bas. In May 2024, he released a grime song on YouTube titled "CC Freestyle". On 23 May, he released the track "Band4Band" alongside Lil Baby. The track debuted at number 4 on the UK Singles Chart and number 22 on the Billboard Hot 100, becoming his highest entry on the latter. Two weeks later, the track reached number 18 on the Hot 100. On 20 June 2024, he appeared on the joint track "Wave" with Nigerian singer Asake.

On 11 July 2024, Central Cee featured on Ice Spice's single "Did It First". The track's rollout sparked controversy and unsound dating rumors between the two. He followed this up with the single "Gen Z Luv" on 26 July. In the song's music video, his forthcoming album Can’t Rush Greatness was announced. On 22 August 2024, Central Cee released two singles, "Bolide Noir" with French rapper JRK 19 and "Billion Streams Freestyle". On 29 October 2024, he released the single "One By One" alongside a ColorsxStudios performance of the song.

On 16 January 2025, Central Cee released the single "GBP" with 21 Savage, with a music video directed by Cole Bennett. A week later, on 24 January, Can't Rush Greatness was released to positive reviews, and became his second number one on the UK Albums Chart, with over 42,000 units sold. It also reached number nine on the Billboard 200, becoming the first UK rap album to reach the top ten. On 28 January, he announced his second headlining tour, the Can't Rush Greatness World Tour.

His sixth EP All Roads Lead Home was released on 19 March 2026, and was supported by the singles "Iceman Freestyle" and "Slaughter" with J Hus.

== Fashion ==
Central Cee is known for his style of fashion, which usually features tracksuits, puffer jackets, and skull caps, items commonly associated with British streetwear culture.

In 2023, Central Cee launched the streetwear brand Syna World. The brand's guerrilla marketing techniques have been compared to fellow UK brands such as Corteiz and Trapstar. He collaborated with French football club Paris Saint-Germain to make a custom kit in September 2024. In October 2024, Central Cee and Syna World collaborated with Nike to release a Tech Fleece tracksuit and Air Max 95's. It was put on sale at JD Sports and on the Nike website.

Central Cee made his modeling debut for Drake's Nike X Nocta collection on 6 April 2021. He fronted Jaquemus' "Neve World" campaign in November 2022.

== Artistry ==
=== Musical style ===
Beginning his career performing British hip-hop, Central Cee switched to the trapwave genre in 2016, a style of British hip-hop which utilises auto-tuned singing. In 2020, he moved to a style similar to UK drill with the release of the single "Day in the Life", and has mostly stuck to that style since then, stating that the auto-tune style was oversaturated. His current style of music has been described as a melodic and upbeat approach to UK drill.

=== Influences ===
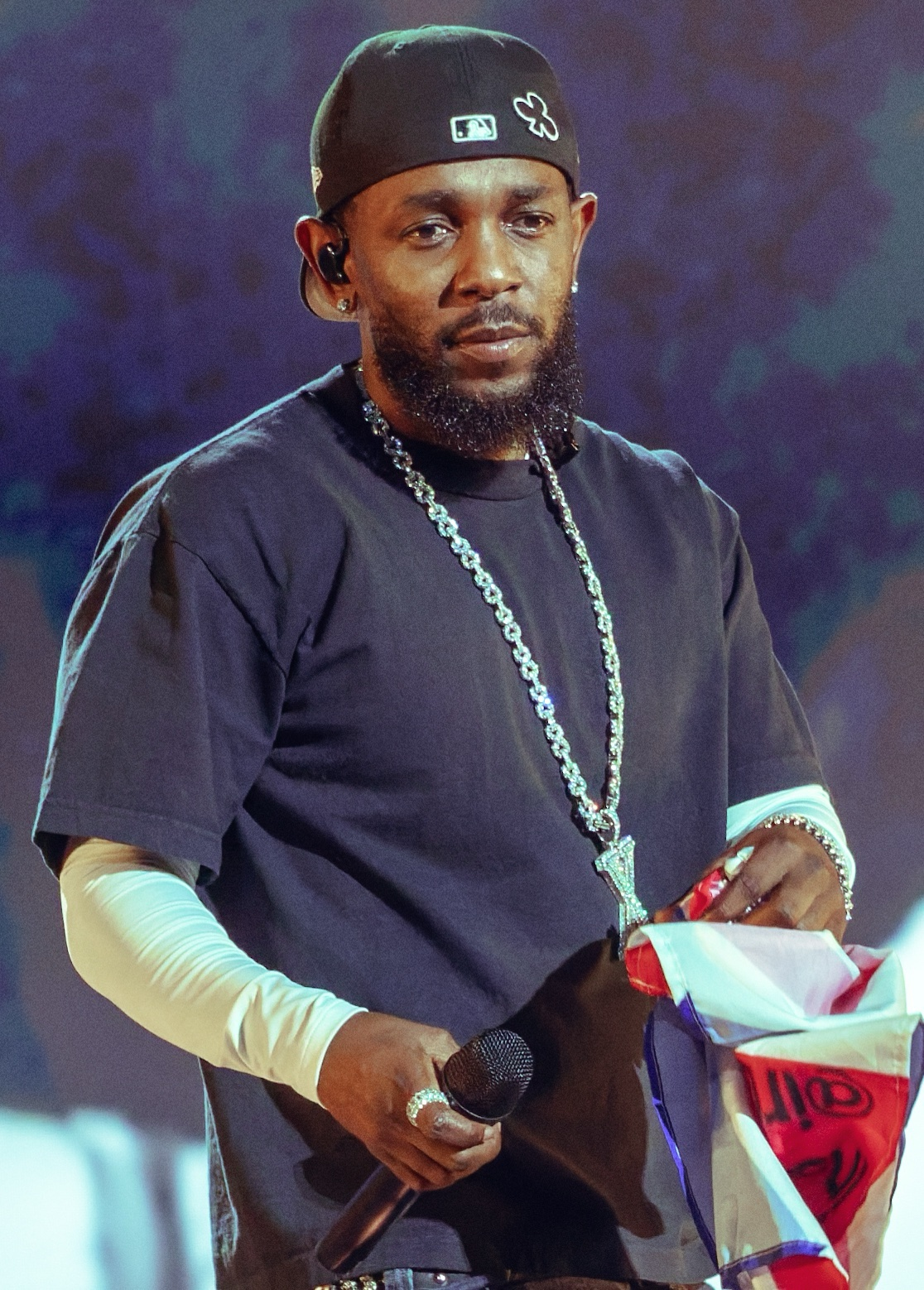
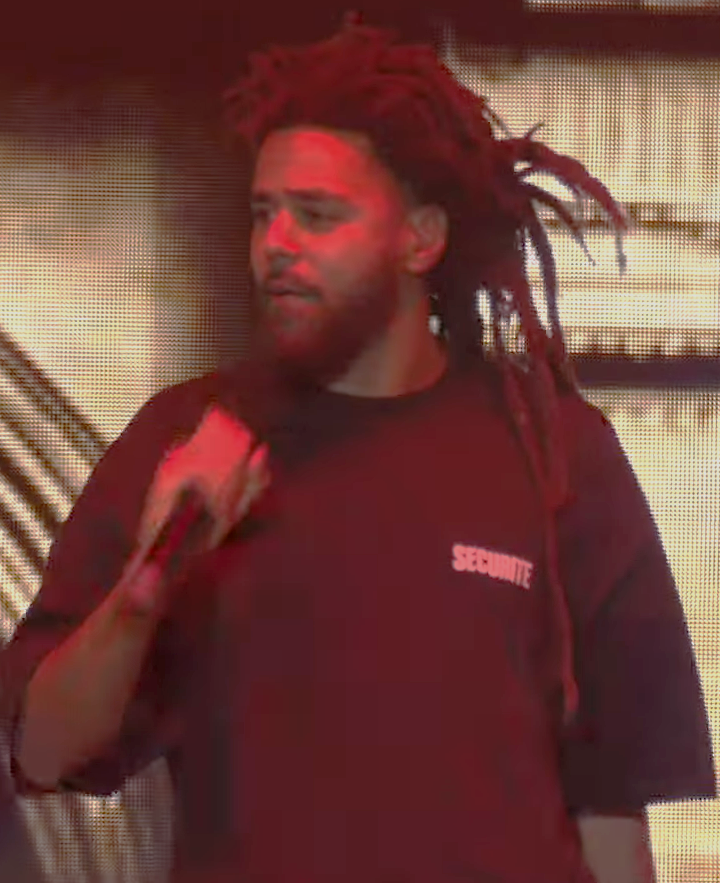
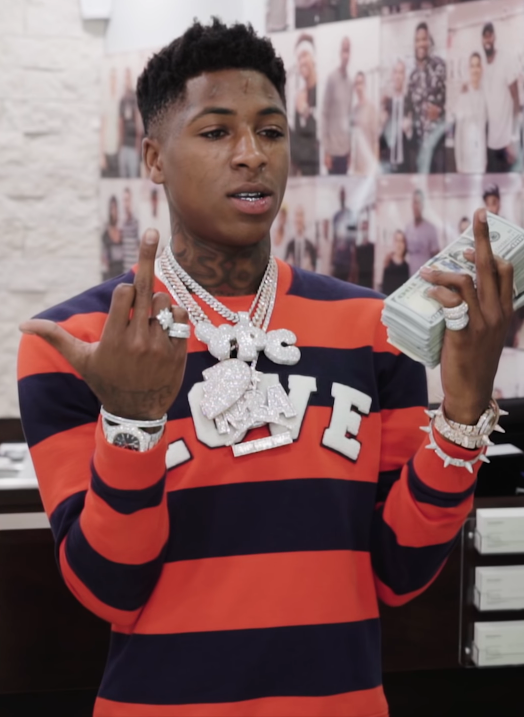
Central Cee cites Kendrick Lamar, J. Cole, and YoungBoy Never Broke Again as some of his main musical inspirations.

Central Cee studied rappers such as Kendrick Lamar, J. Cole, and Jay-Z as a young adult and named YoungBoy Never Broke Again as one of his influences, comparing his approach to the rapper.

There's a lot of people that will testify that he's shit because there's no science to his thing, musically. What I think sells is his personality and his vulnerability in the music. Actually, that probably influenced me a lot.

He has also stated that fellow British rapper Skepta is the "main reason" he started making music.

== Personal life ==
Central Cee dated Madeline Argy, a TikTok creator and host of the Pretty Lonesome podcast, for over two years. Their relationship ended in July 2024.

On February 6, 2026, during a livestream with PlaqueBoyMax, Central Cee announced that he converted to Islam and changed his name to Akhil.

== Discography ==
Albums

- Can't Rush Greatness (2025)

Mixtapes

- Wild West (2021)
- 23 (2022)

== Tours ==
=== Headlining ===
- Still Loading World Tour (2022)
- Can't Rush Greatness World Tour (2025)

== Awards and nominations ==
Organization	Year	Category	Nominated work	Result	Ref.
AIM Independent Music Awards	2021	PPL Award for Most Played New Independent Artist	Himself	Nominated	
BET Awards	2023	Best International Act	Himself	Nominated	
BET Hip Hop Awards	2023	Best Breakthrough Hip Hop Artist	Himself	Nominated	
BET Hip Hop Awards	2023	Best International Flow	Himself	Nominated	
Brit Awards	2022	Best New Artist	Himself	Nominated	
Brit Awards	2022	Best British Hip Hop/Rap/Grime Act	Himself	Nominated	
Brit Awards	2022	British Single of the Year	"Obsessed with You"	Nominated	
Brit Awards	2023	British Artist of the Year	Himself	Nominated	
Brit Awards	2023	Best British Hip Hop/Grime/Rap Act	Himself	Nominated	
Brit Awards	2024	Song of the Year	"Sprinter" (with Dave)	Nominated	
Brit Awards	2024	Song of the Year	"Let Go"	Nominated	
Brit Awards	2024	British Artist of the Year	Himself	Nominated	
Brit Awards	2024	Best British Hip Hop/Grime/Rap Act	Himself	Nominated	
Ivor Novello Awards	2023	Songwriter of the Year	Himself	Nominated	
MOBO Awards	2021	Best Newcomer	Himself	Won	
MOBO Awards	2021	Best Male Act	Himself	Nominated	
MOBO Awards	2021	Best Drill Act	Himself	Won	
MOBO Awards	2021	Song of the Year	"Commitment Issues"	Nominated	
MOBO Awards	2022	Best Male Act	Himself	Won	
MOBO Awards	2022	Best Drill Act	Himself	Nominated	
MOBO Awards	2022	Song of the Year	"Doja"	Nominated	
MOBO Awards	2022	Video of the Year	"Doja"	Won	
MOBO Awards	2023	Best Male Act	Himself	Won	
MOBO Awards	2023	Best Drill Act	Himself	Nominated	
MOBO Awards	2023	Song of the Year	"Sprinter" (with Dave)	Won	
MTV Europe Music Awards	2023	Best Hip-Hop	Himself	Nominated	
MTV Europe Music Awards	2023	Best UK & Ireland Act	Himself	Nominated	
MTV Europe Music Awards	2023	Best Collaboration	"Sprinter" (with Dave)	Nominated	
Les Flammes	2025	Flame of European and/or international collaboration	Central Cee & JRK 19 – "Bolide Noir"	Won	

=== Listicles ===
Publisher	Year	Listicle	Result	Ref.
Forbes	2023	30 Under 30: Entertainment (Europe)	Placed	
