= Brit Award for British R&B Act =

British music award

- Awarded for: Achievement in Excellence: British R&B Act
- Country: United Kingdom
- Presented by: British Phonographic Industry
- First award: 2024
- Currently held by: Sault (2026)

Highlights
- Most awards: RAYE (2)
- Most nominations: Cleo Sol (4)
- Website: www.brits.co.uk

The Brit Award for British R&B Act is an award given by the British Phonographic Industry (BPI), an organisation which represents record companies and artists in the United Kingdom. The accolade is presented at the Brit Awards, an annual celebration of British and international music. Alongside the other genre categories, the winner of the award is selected by the British public. It was presented for the first time at the 2024 Brit Awards.

The inaugural recipient of the award is Raye. Cleo Sol holds the record for most nominations in the category, with four. Raye and Jorja Smith are the only other artists with multiple nominations, with two each respectively.

== History ==
Following the removal of the gendered categories in 2021, it was announced that four new genre categories would be introduced that were voted for by the public. One of these cateogies, Best British Pop/R&B Act, was first presented at the 42nd Brit Awards alongside Rock/Alternative Act, Dance Act and Hip Hop/Grime/Rap Act).

In 2023, it was announced that the Pop/R&B category would be split into British Pop Act and British R&B Act and would be presented for the first time at the 2024 Brit Awards. The change followed criticism that the existing category did not fairly represent the genre and that R&B artists were less likely to be nominated against pop artists.

== Winners and nominees ==
Year	Recipient	Nominees
2024	Raye	Cleo Sol; Jorja Smith; Mahalia; Sault
2025	Raye	Cleo Sol; Flo; Jorja Smith; Michael Kiwanuka
2026	Sault	Jim Legxacy; Kwn; Mabel; Sasha Keable

== Artists with multiple nominations ==
Nominations	Artist
4	Cleo Sol (Note: Including two as a member of Sault.)
2	Jorja Smith
2	Raye
2	Sault
