= Brit Award for British Pop Act =

British music award

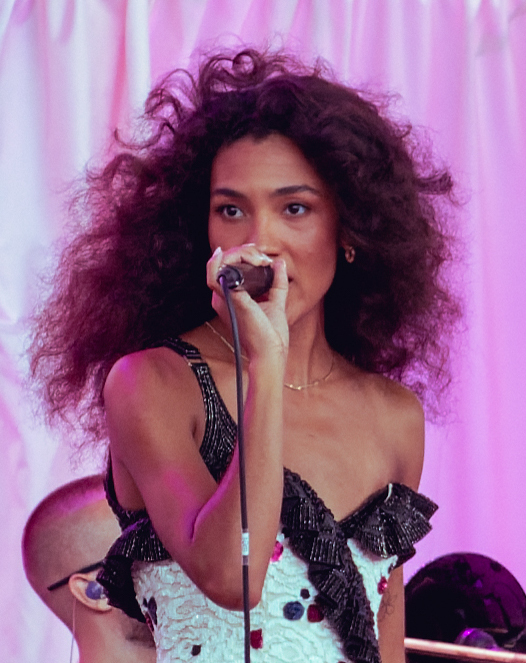
- 2026 winner Olivia Dean
- Awarded for: Achievement in Excellence: British Pop Act
- Country: United Kingdom (UK)
- Presented by: British Phonographic Industry (BPI)
- First award: 2000
- Currently held by: Olivia Dean (2026)

Highlights
- Most awards: Westlife and Dua Lipa (2)
- Most nominations: Westlife (4)
- Website: www.brits.co.uk

The Brit Award for British Pop Act is an award given by the British Phonographic Industry (BPI), an organisation which represents record companies and artists in the United Kingdom. The accolade is presented at the Brit Awards, an annual celebration of British and international music. The winners and nominees were initially determined by the Brit Awards voting academy with over one-thousand members comprising record labels, publishers, managers, agents, media, and previous winners and nominees, but starting with the 42nd Brit Awards ceremony, the award is voted by fans.

Boy band Five are the first winners of the category, while Westlife and Dua Lipa have the most wins, with two. The category was exclusively won by bands until 2006, when James Blunt became the first solo artist to receive the award. S Club 7 hold the record for most nominations without a win, with three. The current holder of the award is Olivia Dean, who won in 2026.

== History ==
The award was first presented as Best British Pop Act at the 2000 Brit Awards and was retired in 2006.

In 2021, it was announced that the category had been revived and renamed Best British Pop/R&B Act following the removal of gendered categories. This new iteration of the award was first presented at the 42nd Brit Awards and the winner is voted for by the public on TikTok alongside the three other genre categories (Rock/Alternative Act, Dance Act and Hip Hop/Grime/Rap Act).

For the 2024 Brit Awards, it was announced that Best British Pop Act would return as it split from R&B and the award for Best British R&B Act. The change follows criticism from many artists in the R&B community around the lack of representation in the category.

== Winners and nominees ==
=== British Pop Act (2000–2006) ===
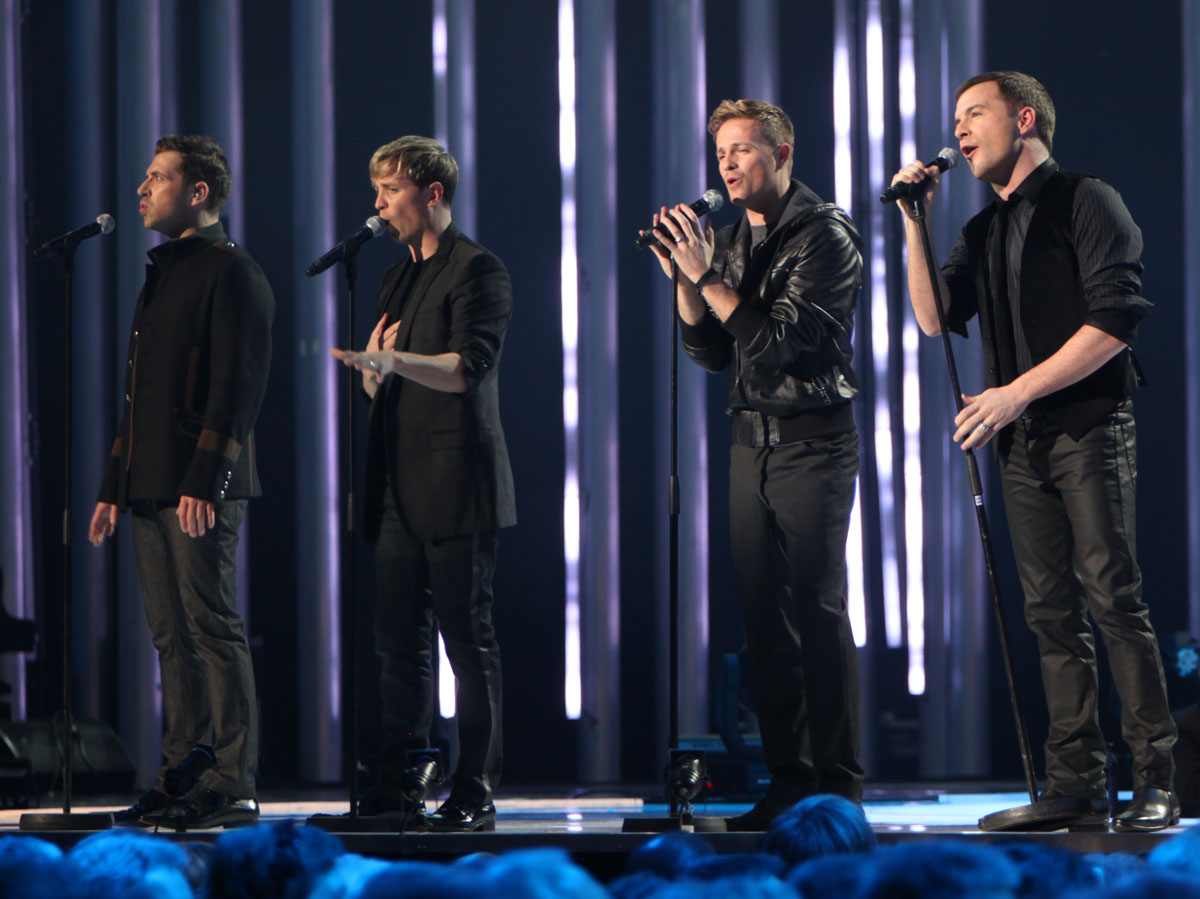
Two-time winners Westlife

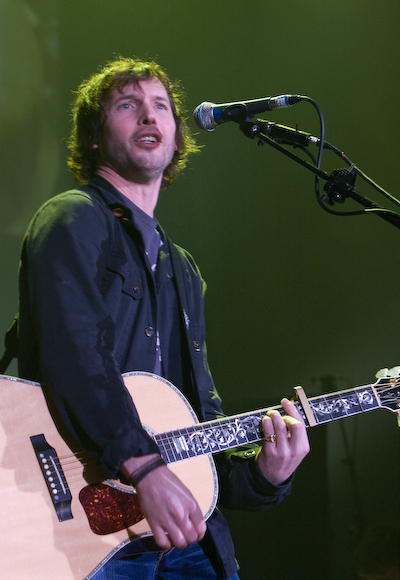
James Blunt was the only solo winner of the award during its original tenure

Year	Recipient	Nominees
2000	Five	Geri Halliwell; Ann Lee; Martine McCutcheon; S Club 7; Steps
2001	Westlife	Ronan Keating; Britney Spears; S Club 7; Steps
2002	Westlife	Blue; Hear'Say; Kylie Minogue; S Club 7
2003	Blue	Gareth Gates; Enrique Iglesias; Pink; Will Young
2004	Busted	Christina Aguilera; Daniel Bedingfield; The Black Eyed Peas; Justin Timberlake
2005	McFly	Natasha Bedingfield; Girls Aloud; Avril Lavigne; Westlife
2006	James Blunt	Kelly Clarkson; Madonna; Katie Melua; Westlife

=== British Pop/R&B Act (2022–2023) ===
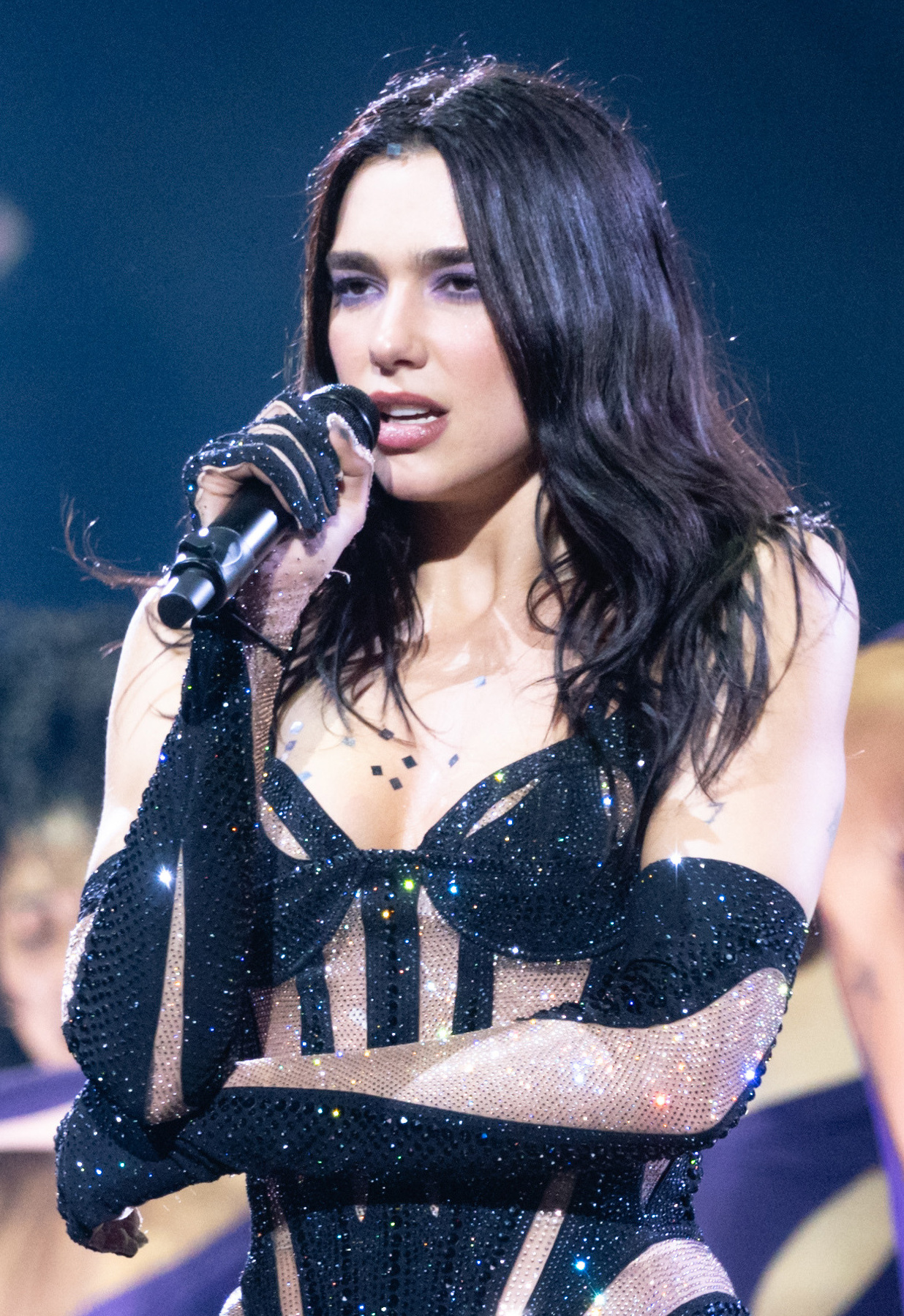
Dua Lipa is the first female winner as well as the first winner of the revived category

Year	Recipient	Nominees
2022	Dua Lipa	Adele; Joy Crookes; Griff; Ed Sheeran
2023	Harry Styles	Cat Burns; Charli XCX; Dua Lipa; Sam Smith

=== British Pop Act (2024–present) ===
Year	Recipient	Nominees
2024	Dua Lipa	Calvin Harris; Charli XCX; Olivia Dean; Raye
2025	JADE	Charli XCX; Dua Lipa; Lola Young; Myles Smith
2026	Olivia Dean	JADE; Lily Allen; Lola Young; Raye

== Multiple nominations and awards ==
Artists who received multiple nominations
Nominations	Artist
4	Dua Lipa
4	Westlife
3	Charli XCX
3	S Club 7
2	Blue
2	JADE
2	Lola Young
2	Olivia Dean
2	Raye
2	Steps

Artists who received multiple awards
Awards	Artist
2	Dua Lipa
2	Westlife

== Notes ==
- Blue (2002) Busted (2004) also won Brit Award for British Breakthrough Act
- James Blunt (2006) also won Brit Award for British Male Solo Artist
- Dua Lipa (2018, 2021) also won Brit Award for British Female Solo Artist
- Dua Lipa (2018) also won Brit Award for Best New Artist
- Westlife (2001~2002), only foreign artist winner
- Foreign artist nominees:
  - Australian: Kylie Minogue
  - Canadian: Avril Lavigne
  - Ireland: Westlife
  - Spanish: Enrique Iglesias
  - United States: Britney Spears, Pink, Christina Aguilera, The Black Eyed Peas, Justin Timberlake, Kelly Clarkson, Madonna
