= Brit Awards 2002 =

British music awards ceremony

- Date: 20 February 2002
- Venue: Earls Court
- Hosted by: Frank Skinner & Zoe Ball
- Most awards: Dido and Kylie Minogue (2)
- Most nominations: Gorillaz (6)

Television/radio coverage
- Network: ITV

Brit Awards 2002 was the 22nd edition of the Brit Awards, an annual pop music awards ceremony in the United Kingdom. It was organised by the British Phonographic Industry and took place on 20 February 2002 at Earls Court in London. The award for International Album was introduced during this ceremony.

== Performances ==
Artist(s)	Song(s)
Dido	"Here with Me"
Gorillaz	"Clint Eastwood"
Jamiroquai featuring Anastacia	"Bad Girls"
Kylie Minogue	"Can't Get Blue Monday Out of My Head"
Mis-Teeq	"One Night Stand” "B with Me” (rap only)
Shaggy featuring Sacha Baron Cohen as Ali G	"Me Julie"
So Solid Crew	"21 Seconds"
Sting	"If You Love Somebody Set Them Free" "If I Ever Lose My Faith in You" "Every Breath You Take" "Every Little Thing She Does Is Magic" "Roxanne"
The Strokes	"Last Nite"

== Winners and nominees ==
British Dance Act (presented by Fiona Allen and Doon Mackichan)	British Pop Act (presented by Sophie Ellis-Bextor)
Basement Jaxx; Gorillaz; Craig David; Fatboy Slim; Faithless	Westlife (Ireland); Blue; Hear'Say; Kylie Minogue (Australia); S Club 7
British Group (presented by Heidi Klum)	British Breakthrough Act (presented by Trevor Nelson)
Travis; Gorillaz; Jamiroquai; Radiohead; Stereophonics	Blue; Atomic Kitten; Elbow; Gorillaz; Mis-Teeq; So Solid Crew; Starsailor; Tom McRae; Turin Brakes; Zero 7
British Male Solo Artist (presented by Susie Amy)	British Female Solo Artist (presented by Johnny Vegas)
Robbie Williams; Aphex Twin; Craig David; Elton John; Ian Brown	Dido; Geri Halliwell; PJ Harvey; Sade; Sophie Ellis-Bextor
British Single of the Year (presented by Simon Cowell)	British Video of the Year (presented by Michael Madsen)
S Club 7 – "Don't Stop Movin'"; Atomic Kitten – "Whole Again"; Bob the Builder – "Mambo No. 5"; Daniel Bedingfield – "Gotta Get Thru This"; DJ Pied Piper and the Masters of Ceremonies – "Do You Really Like It?"; Geri Halliwell – "It's Raining Men"; Gorillaz featuring Del the Funky Homosapien – "Clint Eastwood"; Hear'Say – "Pure and Simple"; Robbie Williams – "Eternity/The Road to Mandalay"; So Solid Crew – "21 Seconds"	So Solid Crew – "21 Seconds"; Basement Jaxx – "Where's Your Head At"; Coldplay – "Trouble"; Dido – "Thank You"; Elton John – "I Want Love"; Fatboy Slim featuring Bootsy Collins – "Weapon of Choice"; Gorillaz featuring Del the Funky Homosapien – "Clint Eastwood"; Robbie Williams and Kylie Minogue – "Kids"; Robbie Williams – "Supreme"; Travis – "Sing"
British Album of the Year (presented by Sol Campbell)	International Album (presented by Eddie Irvine)
Dido – No Angel; Craig David – Born to Do It; Gorillaz – Gorillaz; Radiohead – Kid A; Travis – The Invisible Band	Kylie Minogue – Fever; Alicia Keys – Songs in A Minor; Daft Punk – Discovery; Destiny's Child – Survivor; The Strokes – Is This It
International Male Solo Artist (presented by Daryl Hannah)	International Female Solo Artist (presented by Russell Crowe)
Shaggy; Bob Dylan; Dr. Dre; Ryan Adams; Wyclef Jean	Kylie Minogue; Alicia Keys; Anastacia; Björk; Nelly Furtado
International Group (presented by Martin Kemp)	International Breakthrough Act (presented by Samantha Mumba)
Destiny's Child; Daft Punk; Limp Bizkit; R.E.M.; The Strokes	The Strokes; Anastacia; The Avalanches; Linkin Park; Nelly Furtado

=== Outstanding Contribution to Music ===
- Sting

== Multiple nominations and awards ==
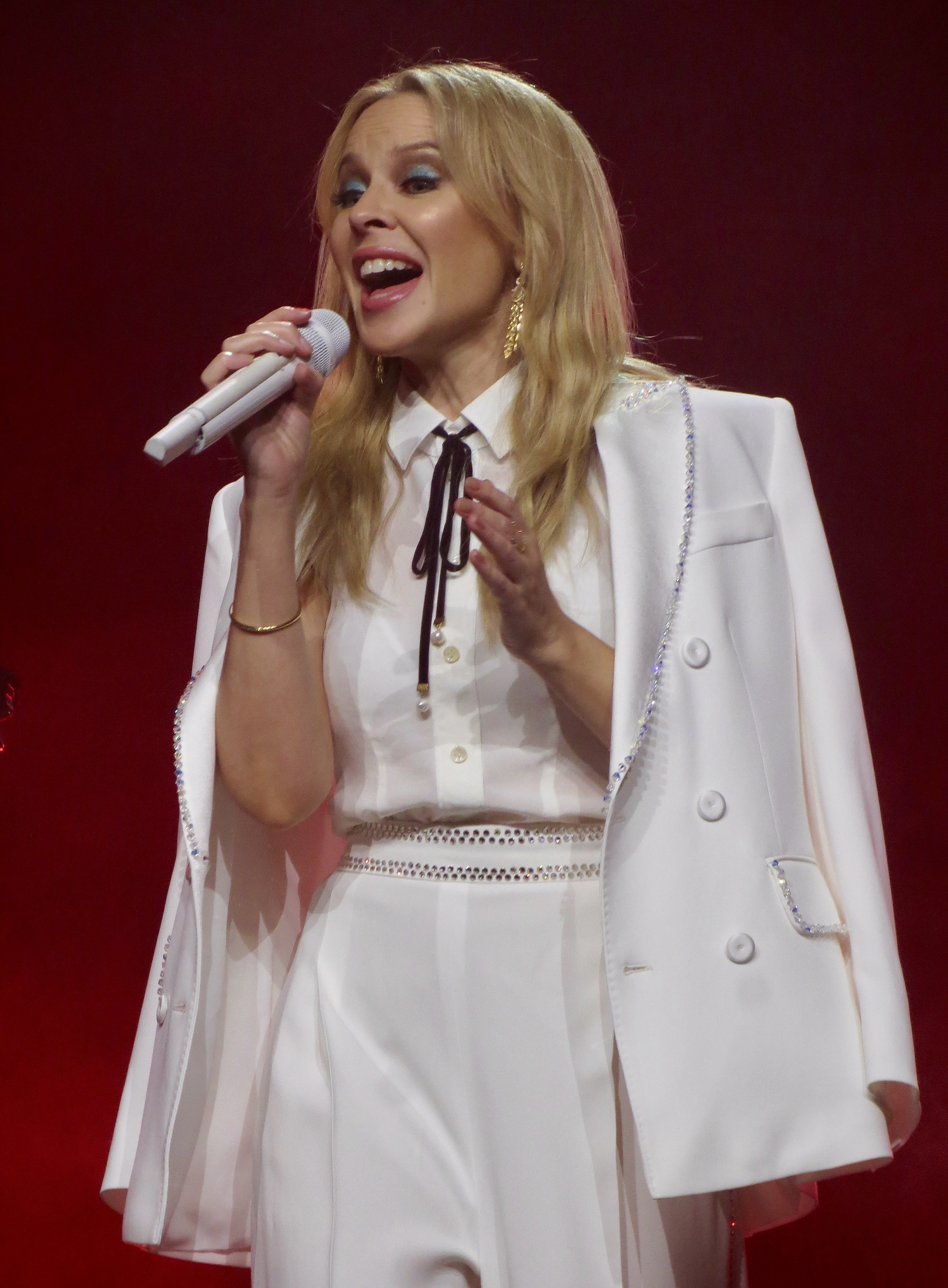
Two-time winner Kylie Minogue

Artists that received multiple nominations
Nominations	Artist
6	Gorillaz
4 (2)	Kylie Minogue
4 (2)	Robbie Williams
3 (5)	Craig David
3 (5)	Dido
3 (5)	So Solid Crew
3 (5)	The Strokes
3 (5)	Travis
2 (15)	Alicia Keys
2 (15)	Anastacia
2 (15)	Atomic Kitten
2 (15)	Basement Jaxx
2 (15)	Blue
2 (15)	Daft Punk
2 (15)	Del the Funky Homosapien
2 (15)	Destiny's Child
2 (15)	Elton John
2 (15)	Fatboy Slim
2 (15)	Geri Halliwell
2 (15)	Hear'Say
2 (15)	Nelly Furtado
2 (15)	Radiohead
2 (15)	S Club 7

Artists that received multiple awards
Awards	Artist
2 (2)	Dido
2 (2)	Kylie Minogue
