= Brit Award for International Female Solo Artist =

British music award

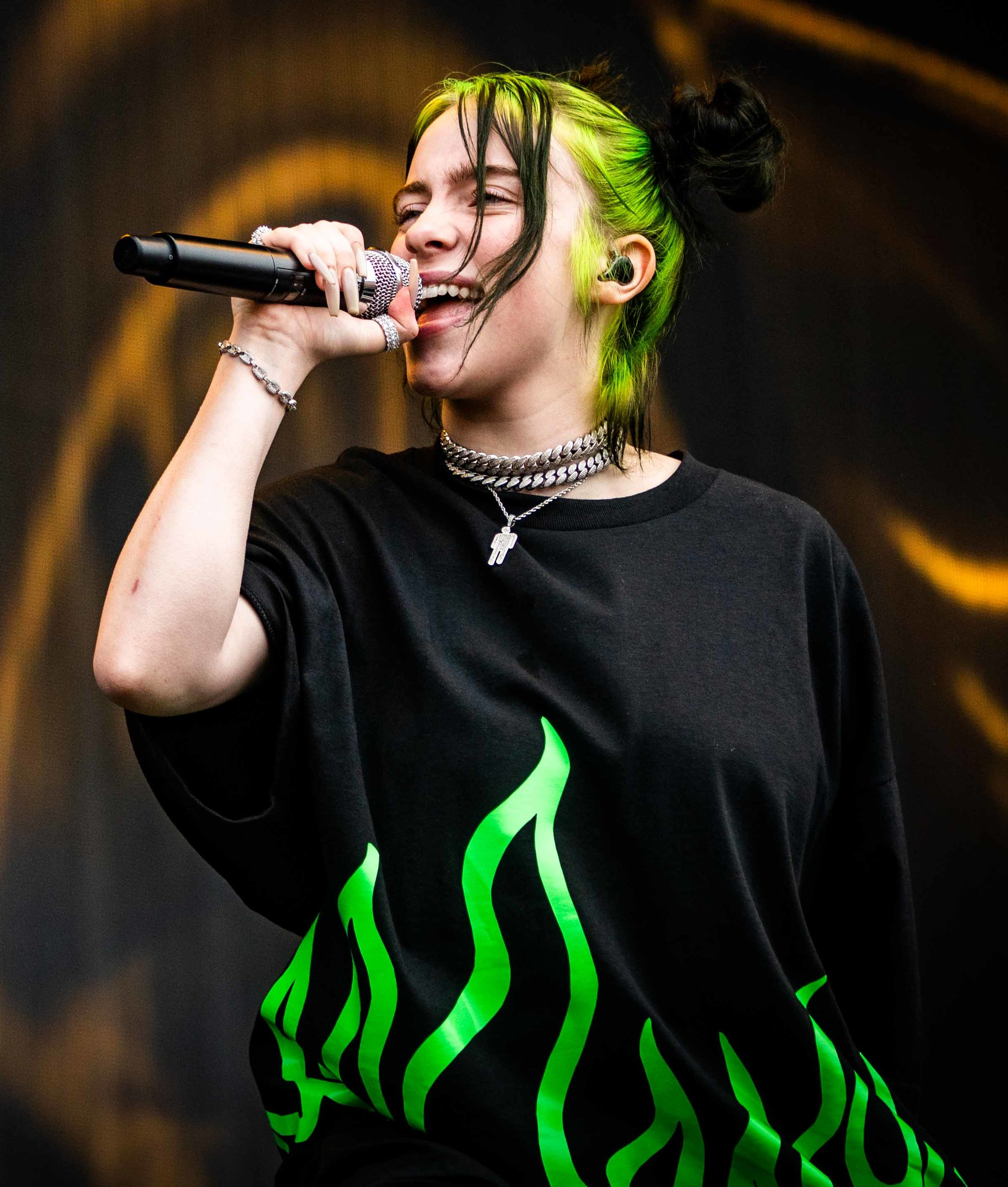
- 2021 Winner Billie Eilish
- Awarded for: Achievement in Excellent International Female Solo Artist
- Country: United Kingdom (UK)
- Presented by: British Phonographic Industry (BPI)
- First award: 1989
- Final award: 2021
- Currently held by: Billie Eilish (2021)

Highlights
- Most awards: Björk (4)
- Most nominations: Björk (9)
- Website: www.brits.co.uk

The Brit Award for International Female Solo Artist was an award given by the British Phonographic Industry (BPI), an organisation which represents record companies and artists in the United Kingdom. The accolade is presented at the Brit Awards, an annual celebration of British and international music. The winners and nominees were determined by the Brit Awards voting academy with over one-thousand members, which comprise record labels, publishers, managers, agents, media, and previous winners and nominees.

== History ==
The award was first presented in 1989 as International Female Solo Artist. The accolade was not handed out at the 1990, 1992 and 1993 ceremonies, with the award for International Solo Artist (given to a male or female artist) being awarded instead. The award for International Female Solo Artist was reinstated in 1994, but was again retired in favour of the gender-neutral award following the abolition of gendered categories in 2022.

Björk is the artist with the most wins and nominations in the category, with four awards won out of nine nominations. Two artists achieved two consecutive wins; Rihanna in 2011 and 2012 and Billie Eilish in 2020 and 2021. Artists from the United States won the accolade sixteen times, more than any other country.

== Winners and nominees ==
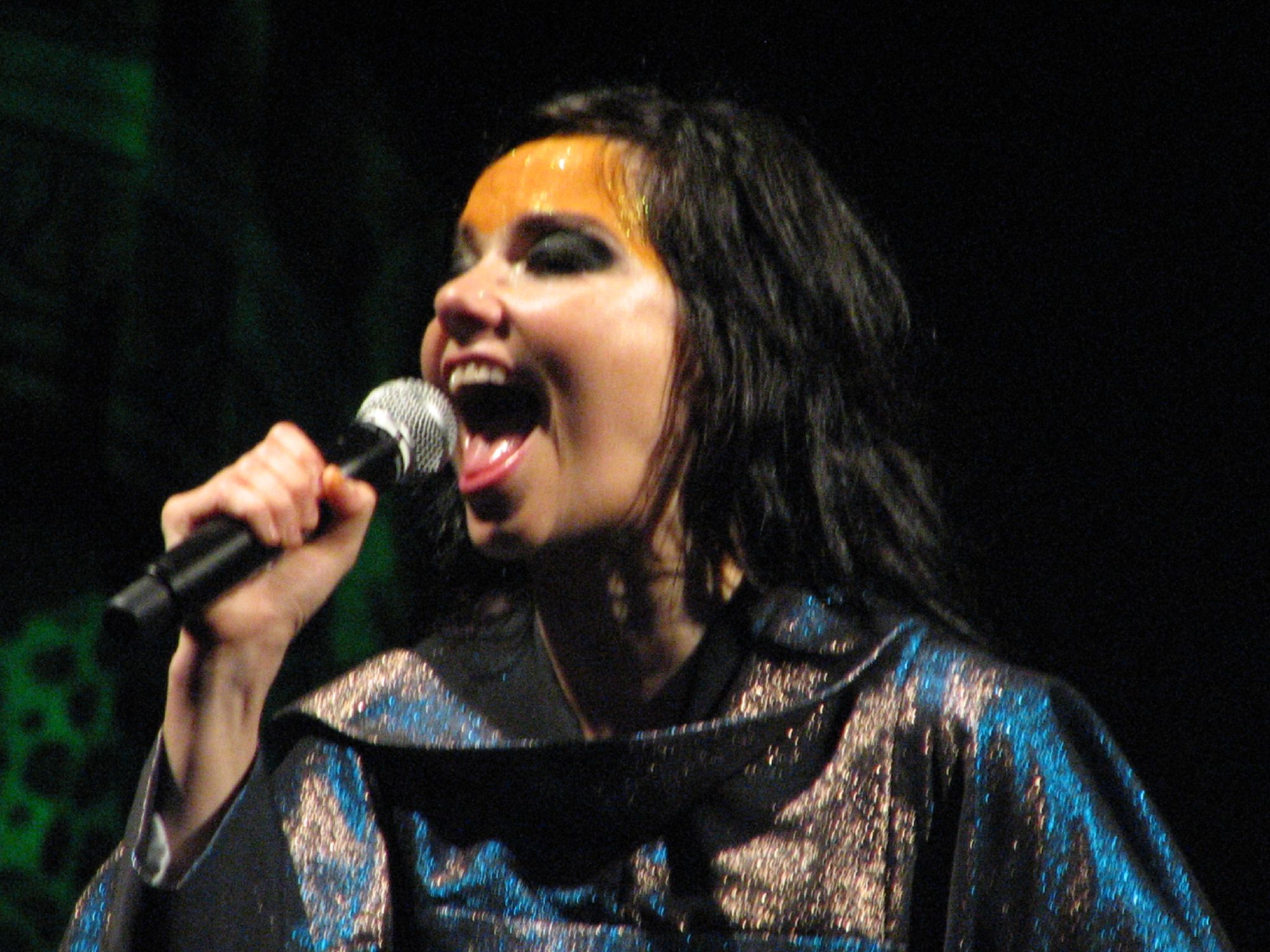
Björk holds both records for most wins and nominations in the category.

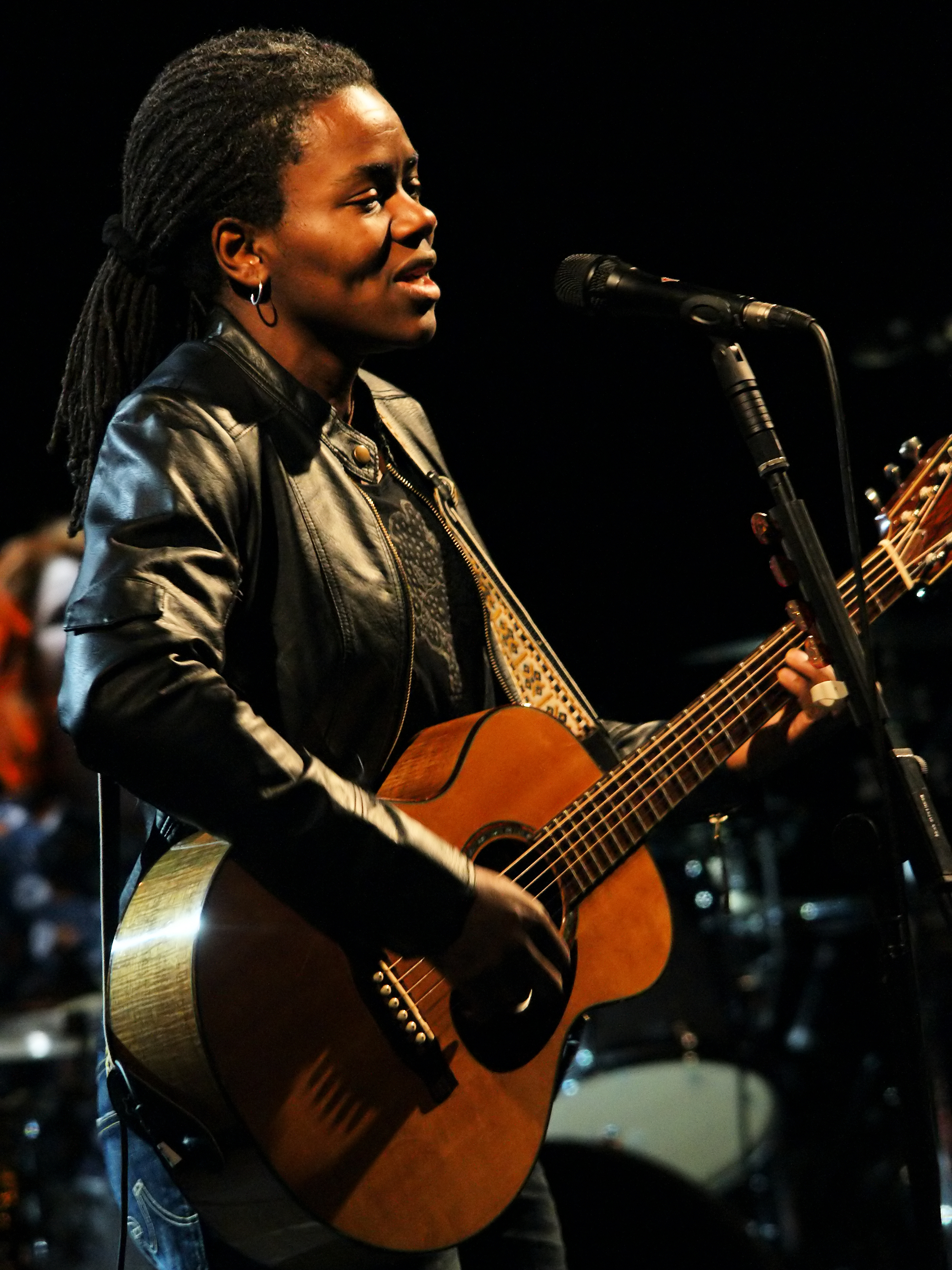
Tracy Chapman was the first recipient of the award in 1989.

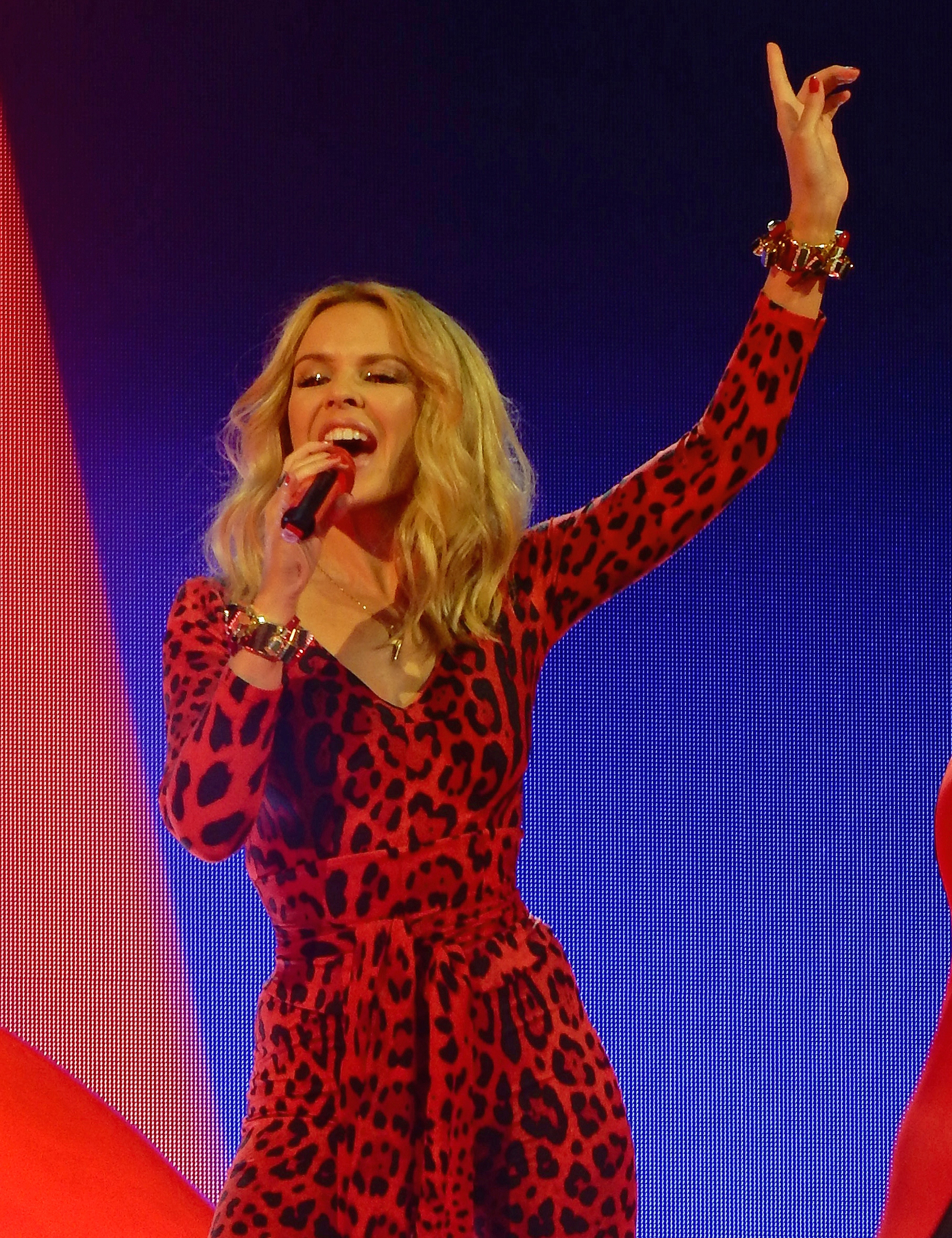
Two-time winner and eight-time nominee Kylie Minogue

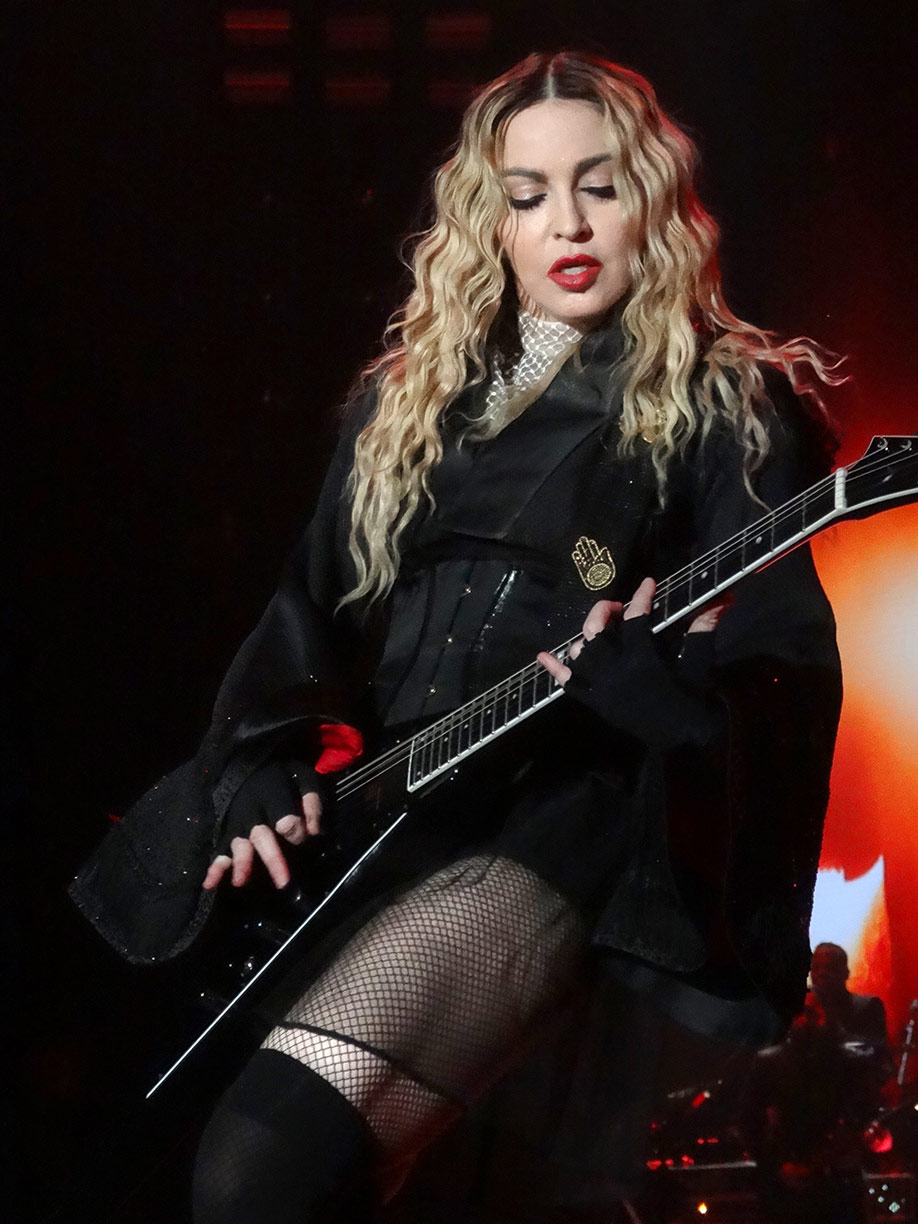
Two-time winner and five-time nominee Madonna.

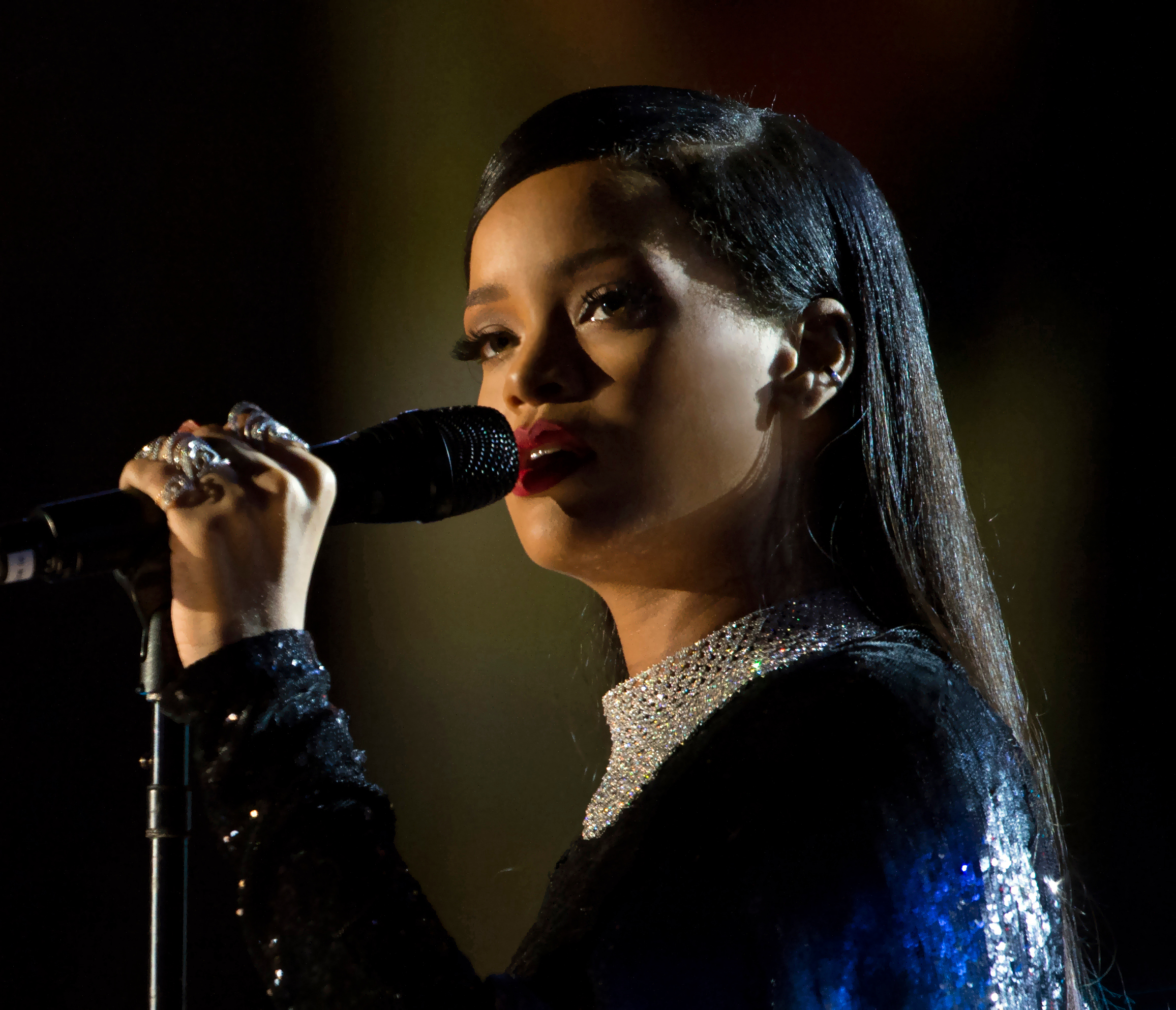
Rihanna is one of only two artists to win the award in consecutive years.

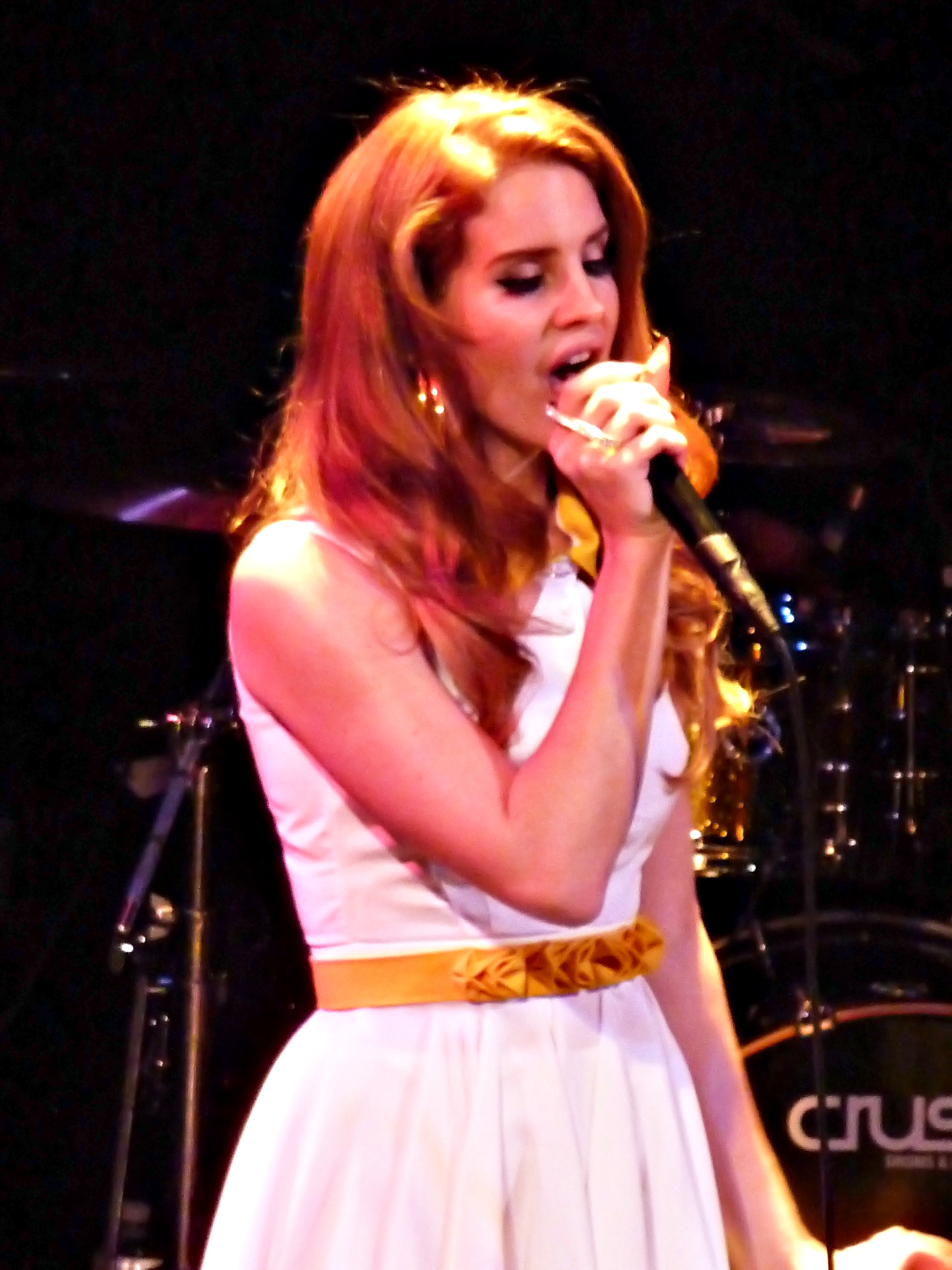
2013 recipient Lana Del Rey.

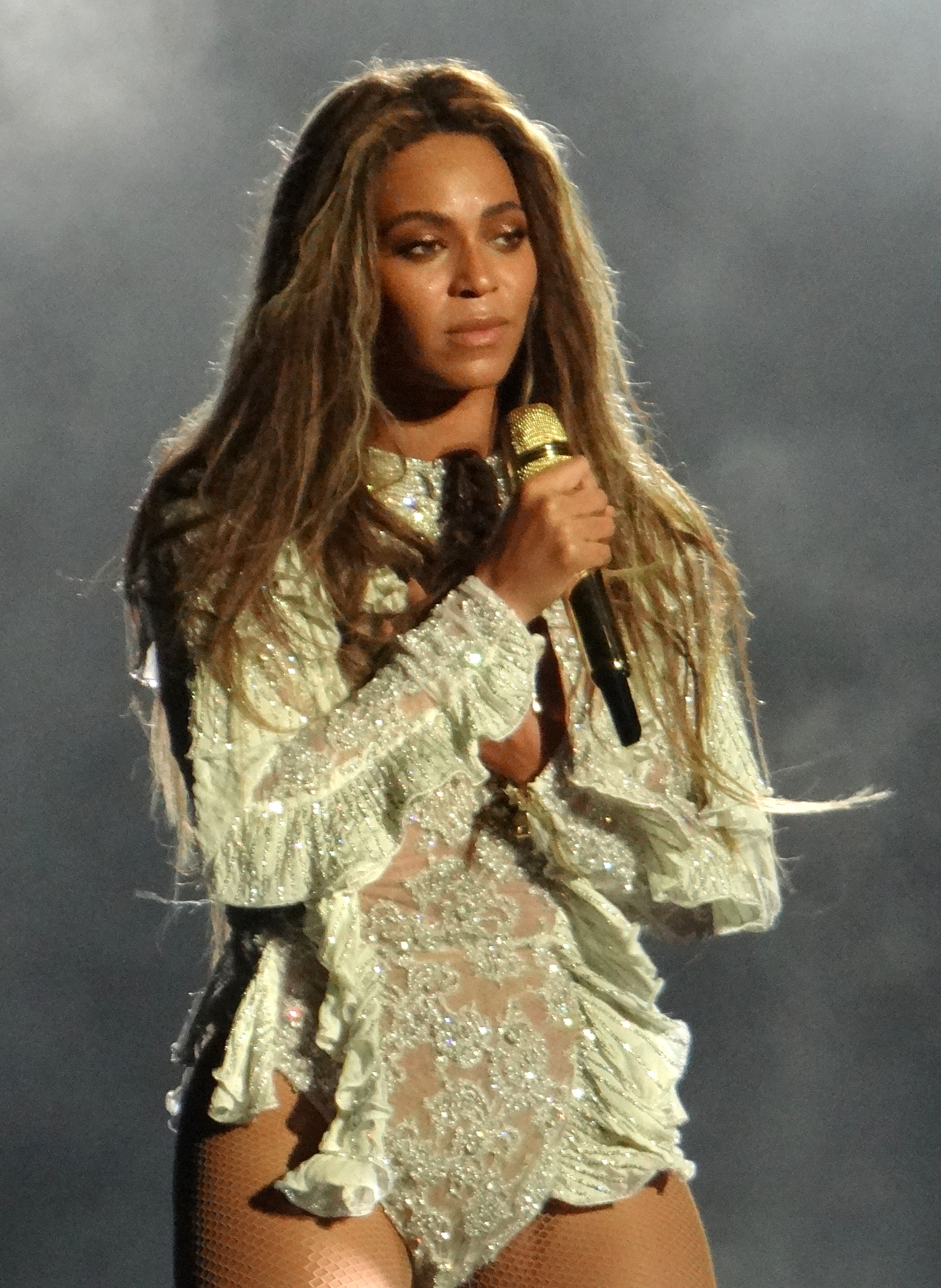
Two-time winner and six-time nominee Beyoncé

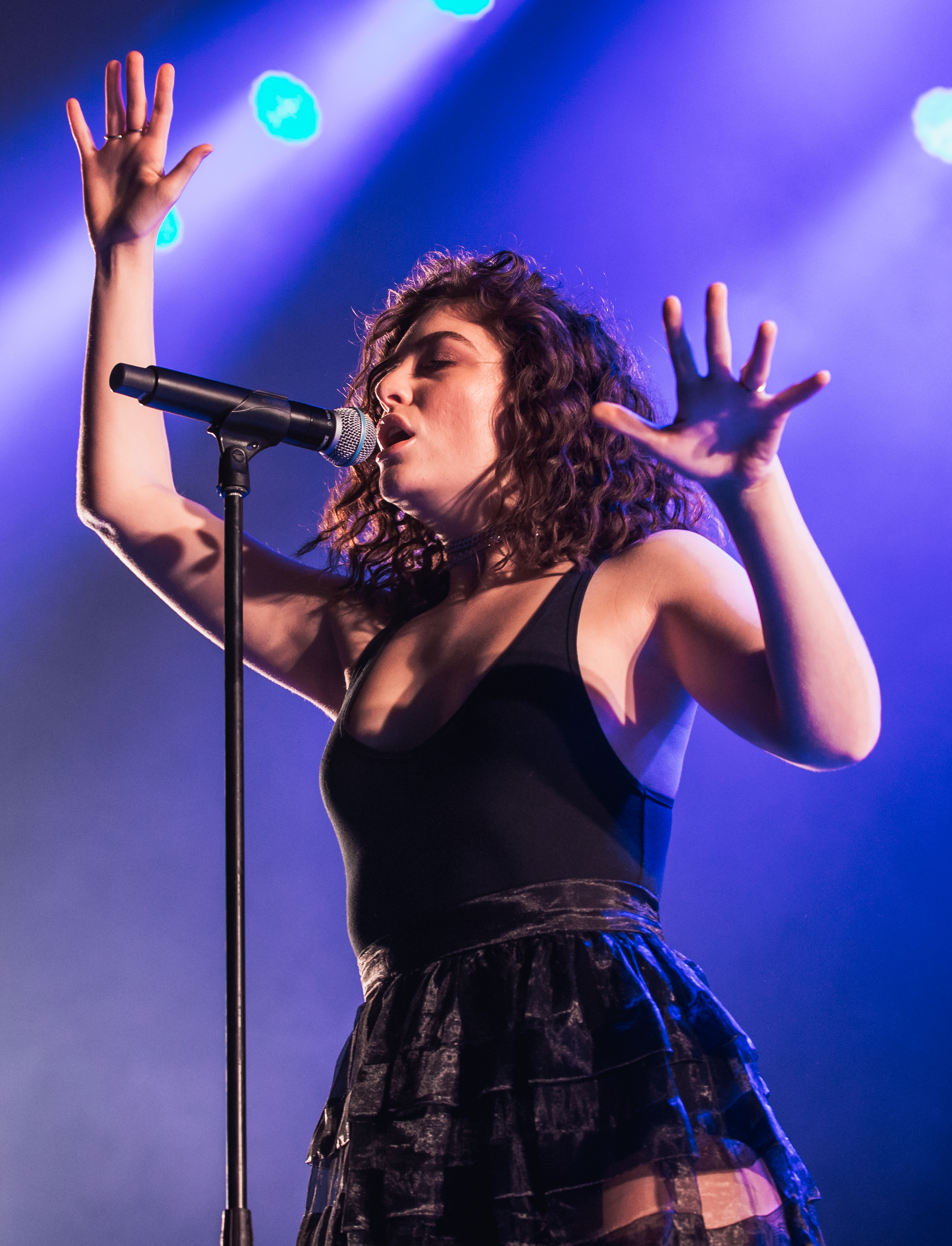
Two-time winner Lorde (2014, 2018)

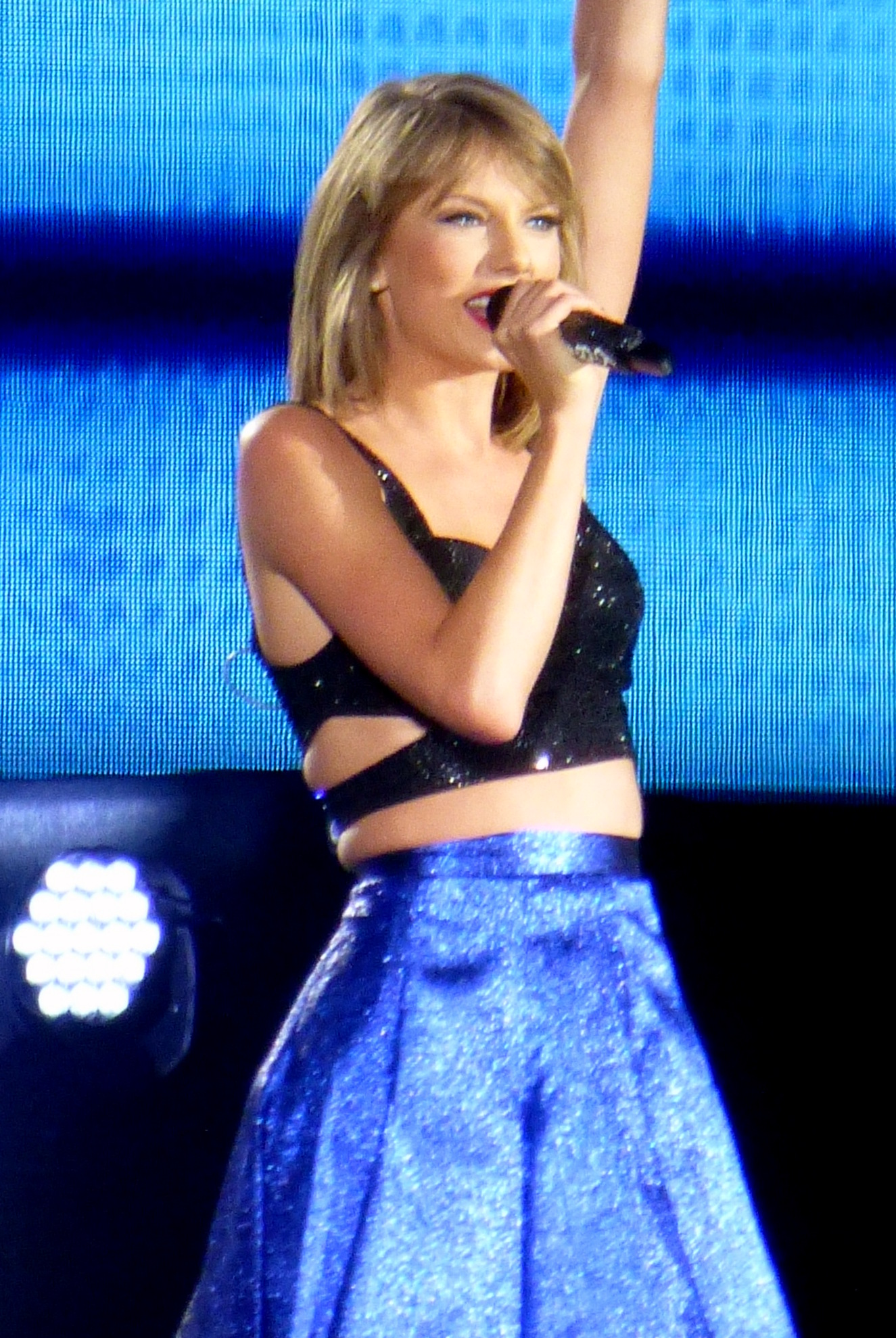
Four-time nominee and 2015 winner Taylor Swift

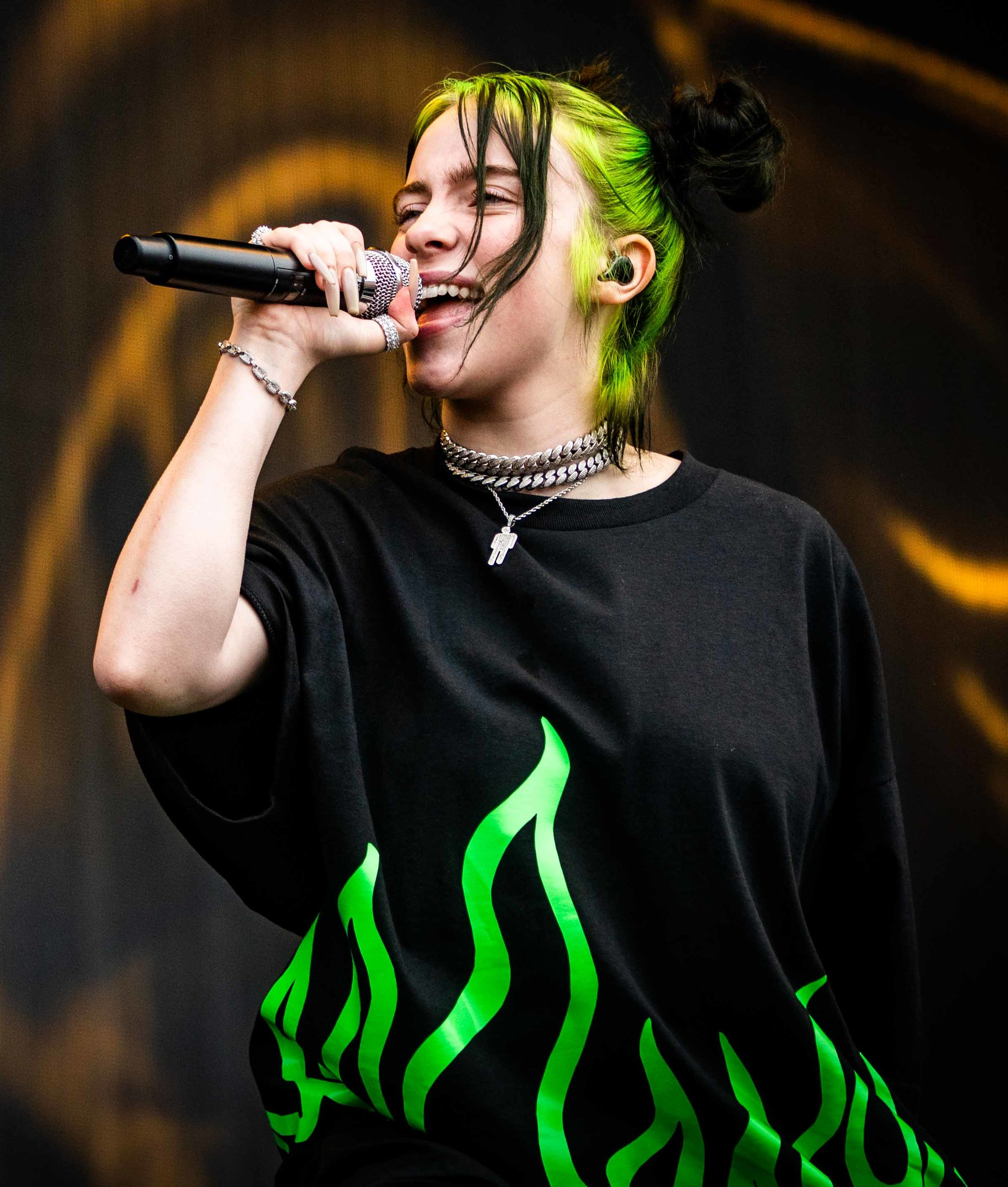
Billie Eilish was the last artist to win the award consecutively.

Year	Recipient	Nominees
1989	(United States) Tracy Chapman	(United States) Anita Baker; (Republic of Ireland) Enya; (United States) Whitney Houston; (Australia) Kylie Minogue
1990	Not Awarded	
1991	(Republic of Ireland) Sinéad O'Connor	(United States) Mariah Carey; (Sweden) Neneh Cherry; (United States) Whitney Houston; (United States) Janet Jackson; (United States) Madonna; (United States) Tina Turner
1992	Not Awarded	
1993	Not Awarded	
1994	(Iceland) Björk	(United States) Mariah Carey; (United States) Nanci Griffith; (United States) Janet Jackson; (United States) Tina Turner
1995	(Canada) k.d. lang	(United States) Tori Amos; (United States) Madonna; (Australia) Kylie Minogue; (Republic of Ireland) Sinéad O'Connor
1996	(Iceland) Björk	(Canada) Celine Dion; (United States) Mariah Carey; (Canada) k.d. lang; (Canada) Alanis Morissette
1997	(United States) Sheryl Crow	(United States) Toni Braxton; (Sweden) Neneh Cherry; (Canada) Celine Dion; (United States) Joan Osborne
1998	(Iceland) Björk	(United States) Erykah Badu; (United States) Meredith Brooks; (Canada) Celine Dion; (United States) Janet Jackson
1999	(Australia) Natalie Imbruglia	(United States) Sheryl Crow; (United States) Lauryn Hill; (United States) Madonna; (Canada) Alanis Morissette
2000	(United States) Macy Gray	(United States) Mary J. Blige; (United States) Whitney Houston; (United States) Jennifer Lopez; (United States) Britney Spears
2001	(United States) Madonna	(Australia) Kylie Minogue; (United States) Pink; (United States) Jill Scott; (United States) Britney Spears
2002	(Australia) Kylie Minogue	(United States) Anastacia; (Iceland) Björk; (Canada) Nelly Furtado; (United States) Alicia Keys
2003	(United States) Pink	(United States) Missy Elliott; (United States) Norah Jones; (United States) Alicia Keys; (Canada) Avril Lavigne
2004	(United States) Beyoncé	(United States) Missy Elliott; (United States) Christina Aguilera; (United States) Alicia Keys; (Australia) Kylie Minogue
2005	(United States) Gwen Stefani	(United States) Anastacia; (United States) Kelis; (United States) Alicia Keys; (Australia) Kylie Minogue
2006	(United States) Madonna	(Iceland) Björk; (United States) Mariah Carey; (United States) Kelly Clarkson; (United States) Missy Elliott
2007	(Canada) Nelly Furtado	(United States) Christina Aguilera; (United States) Beyoncé; (United States) Cat Power; (United States) Pink
2008	(Australia) Kylie Minogue	(Iceland) Björk; (Canada) Feist; (United States) Alicia Keys; (Barbados) Rihanna
2009	(United States) Katy Perry	(United States) Beyoncé; (Australia) Gabriella Cilmi; (United States) Pink; (United States) Santigold
2010	(United States) Lady Gaga	(United States) Norah Jones; (New Zealand) Ladyhawke; (Barbados) Rihanna; (Colombia) Shakira
2011	(Barbados) Rihanna	(United States) Alicia Keys; (Australia) Kylie Minogue; (United States) Katy Perry; (Sweden) Robyn
2012	(Barbados) Rihanna	(United States) Beyoncé; (Iceland) Björk; (Canada) Feist; (United States) Lady Gaga
2013	(United States) Lana Del Rey	(United States) Cat Power; (United States) Alicia Keys; (Barbados) Rihanna; (United States) Taylor Swift
2014	(New Zealand) Lorde	(United States) Lady Gaga; (United States) Janelle Monáe; (United States) Katy Perry; (United States) Pink
2015	(United States) Taylor Swift	(United States) Beyoncé; (United States) Lana Del Rey; (Australia) Sia; (United States) St. Vincent
2016	(Iceland) Björk	(Australia) Courtney Barnett; (United States) Lana Del Rey; (United States) Ariana Grande; (United States) Meghan Trainor
2017	(United States) Beyoncé	(France) Christine and the Queens (Note: Now primarily known as Rahim Redcar, he was nominated in the female category prior to coming out as a trans man. He still occasionally uses the name Christine and the Queens.); (Barbados) Rihanna; (Australia) Sia; (United States) Solange
2018	(New Zealand) Lorde	(Iceland) Björk; (United States) Alicia Keys; (United States) Pink; (United States) Taylor Swift
2019	(United States) Ariana Grande	(Cuba) / (Mexico) / (United States) Camila Cabello; (United States) Cardi B; (France) Christine and the Queens; (United States) Janelle Monáe
2020	(United States) Billie Eilish	(Cuba) / (Mexico) / (United States) Camila Cabello; (United States) Lana Del Rey; (United States) Ariana Grande; (United States) Lizzo
2021	(United States) Billie Eilish	(United States) Cardi B; (United States) Taylor Swift; (United States) Ariana Grande; (United States) Miley Cyrus

== Artists with multiple wins ==
Artists that received multiple awards
Awards	Artist
4	Björk
2	Beyoncé
2	Billie Eilish
2	Kylie Minogue
2	Lorde
2	Madonna
2	Rihanna

== Artists with multiple nominations ==
9 nominations

- Björk

8 nominations

- Alicia Keys
- Kylie Minogue

6 nominations

- Beyoncé
- Pink
- Rihanna

5 nominations

- Madonna

4 nominations

- Mariah Carey
- Lana Del Rey
- Ariana Grande
- Taylor Swift

3 nominations

- Celine Dion
- Missy Elliott
- Whitney Houston
- Janet Jackson
- Lady Gaga
- Katy Perry

2 nominations

- Christina Aguilera
- Anastacia
- Camila Cabello
- Cat Power
- Neneh Cherry
- Christine and the Queens
- Sheryl Crow
- Billie Eilish
- Feist
- Nelly Furtado
- Norah Jones
- k.d. lang
- Lorde
- Janelle Monáe
- Alanis Morissette
- Sinéad O'Connor
- Sia
- Britney Spears
- Tina Turner

== See also ==
- List of music awards honoring women

== Awards by country ==
Countries by wins
Country	Wins	First win	Last win	Artist/s
United States	16	1989	2021	Tracy Chapman, Sheryl Crow, Macy Gray, Madonna, Pink, Beyoncé, Gwen Stefani, Katy Perry, Lady Gaga, Lana Del Rey, Taylor Swift, Ariana Grande, Billie Eilish
Iceland	4	1994	2016	Björk
Australia	3	1999	2008	Natalie Imbruglia, Kylie Minogue
Barbados	2	2011	2012	Rihanna
Canada	2	1995	2007	k.d. lang, Nelly Furtado
New Zealand	2	2014	2018	Lorde
Ireland	1	1991		Sinéad O'Connor

Countries by nominations
Country	Nominations	First nomination	Last nomination	Artist/s
United States	100	1989	2021	Majority of nominees
Australia	13	1989	2017	Kylie Minogue, Natalie Imbruglia, Gabriella Cilmi, Sia
Canada	12	1995	2012	k.d. lang, Celine Dion, Alanis Morissette, Nelly Furtado, Avril Lavigne, Feist
Iceland	9	1994	2018	Björk
Barbados	6	2008	2017	Rihanna
Ireland	3	1989	1995	Enya, Sinéad O'Connor
New Zealand	3	2010	2018	Ladyhawke, Lorde
Sweden	3	1991	2011	Neneh Cherry, Robyn
Cuba	2	2019	2020	Camila Cabello
France	2	2017	2019	Christine and the Queens
Mexico	2	2019	2020	Camila Cabello

== Notes ==
- Tracy Chapman (1989), Björk (1994), Natalie Imbruglia (1999), Macy Gray (2000), Lady Gaga (2010) also won Brit Award for International Breakthrough Act
- Billie Eilish (2022) also won Brit Award for International Solo Artist
