= Brit Awards 2004 =

British music awards ceremony

- Date: 17 February 2004
- Venue: Earls Court
- Hosted by: Cat Deeley
- Most awards: The Darkness (3)
- Most nominations: The Darkness (4)

Television/radio coverage
- Network: ITV

Brit Awards 2004 was the 24th edition of the annual Brit Awards, a pop music award ceremony in the United Kingdom run by the British Phonographic Industry. The event took place on 17 February 2004 at Earls Court in London. The awards were marked by a set of victories by the rock band The Darkness who won the first British Rock Act award presented at the BRIT Awards. The show was broadcast by the ITV, and attracted 6.18 million viewers.

== Performances ==
Artist(s)	Song(s)
Beyoncé	"Crazy in Love"
The Black Eyed Peas	"Shut Up"
Busted	"Teenage Kicks"
Jamie Cullum; Katie Melua	"The Love Cats"
The Darkness	"I Believe in a Thing Called Love" "Growing on Me"
Duran Duran	"Hungry Like the Wolf"
50 Cent	"In da Club"
Alicia Keys; Gwen Stefani; Missy Elliott	"Kiss"
Muse	"Hysteria"
Outkast	"Hey Ya!"

== Winners and nominees ==
The nominations were announced on 12 January 2004.

British Album of the Year (presented by Scarlett Johansson)	British Single of the Year (presented by Neil Fox)
The Darkness – Permission to Land; Blur – Think Tank; The Coral – Magic and Medicine; Daniel Bedingfield – Gotta Get thru This; Dido – Life for Rent	Dido – "White Flag"; Gareth Gates – "Spirit in the Sky"; Jamelia – "Superstar"; Mis-Teeq – "Scandalous"; Rachel Stevens – "Sweet Dreams My LA Ex"
British Male Solo Artist (presented by Kerry Katona)	British Female Solo Artist (presented by Ronan Keating)
Daniel Bedingfield; Badly Drawn Boy; David Bowie; Dizzee Rascal; Will Young	Dido; Amy Winehouse; Annie Lennox; Jamelia; Sophie Ellis-Bextor
British Group (presented by Ronan Keating)	British Breakthrough Act (presented by Chris Moyles)
The Darkness; Busted; The Coral; Radiohead; Sugababes	Busted; The Darkness; Dizzee Rascal; Jamie Cullum; Lemar
British Dance Act (presented by Dermot O'Leary)	British Pop Act (presented by Leigh Francis)
Basement Jaxx; Goldfrapp; Groove Armada; Kosheen; Lemon Jelly	Busted; The Black Eyed Peas (United States); Christina Aguilera (United States); Daniel Bedingfield; Justin Timberlake (United States)
British Urban Act (presented by N.E.R.D)	British Rock Act (presented by Jamelia)
Lemar; Amy Winehouse; Big Brovaz; Dizzee Rascal; Mis-teeq	The Darkness; Feeder; Muse; Primal Scream; Stereophonics
Outstanding Contribution to Music (presented by Justin Timberlake)	International Album (presented by Gwen Stefani and Tony Kanal)
Duran Duran	Justin Timberlake – Justified; Beyoncé – Dangerously in Love; Christina Aguilera – Stripped; Outkast – Speakerboxxx/The Love Below; The White Stripes – Elephant
International Male Solo Artist (presented by Shania Twain)	International Female Solo Artist (presented by LL Cool J)
Justin Timberlake; 50 Cent; Beck; Damien Rice; Sean Paul	Beyoncé; Alicia Keys; Christina Aguilera; Kylie Minogue; Missy Elliott
International Group (presented by Lionel Richie)	International Breakthrough Act (presented by Alicia Keys)
The White Stripes; The Black Eyed Peas; Kings of Leon; Outkast; The Strokes	50 Cent; Evanescence; Kings of Leon; Sean Paul; The Thrills

== Multiple nominations and awards ==
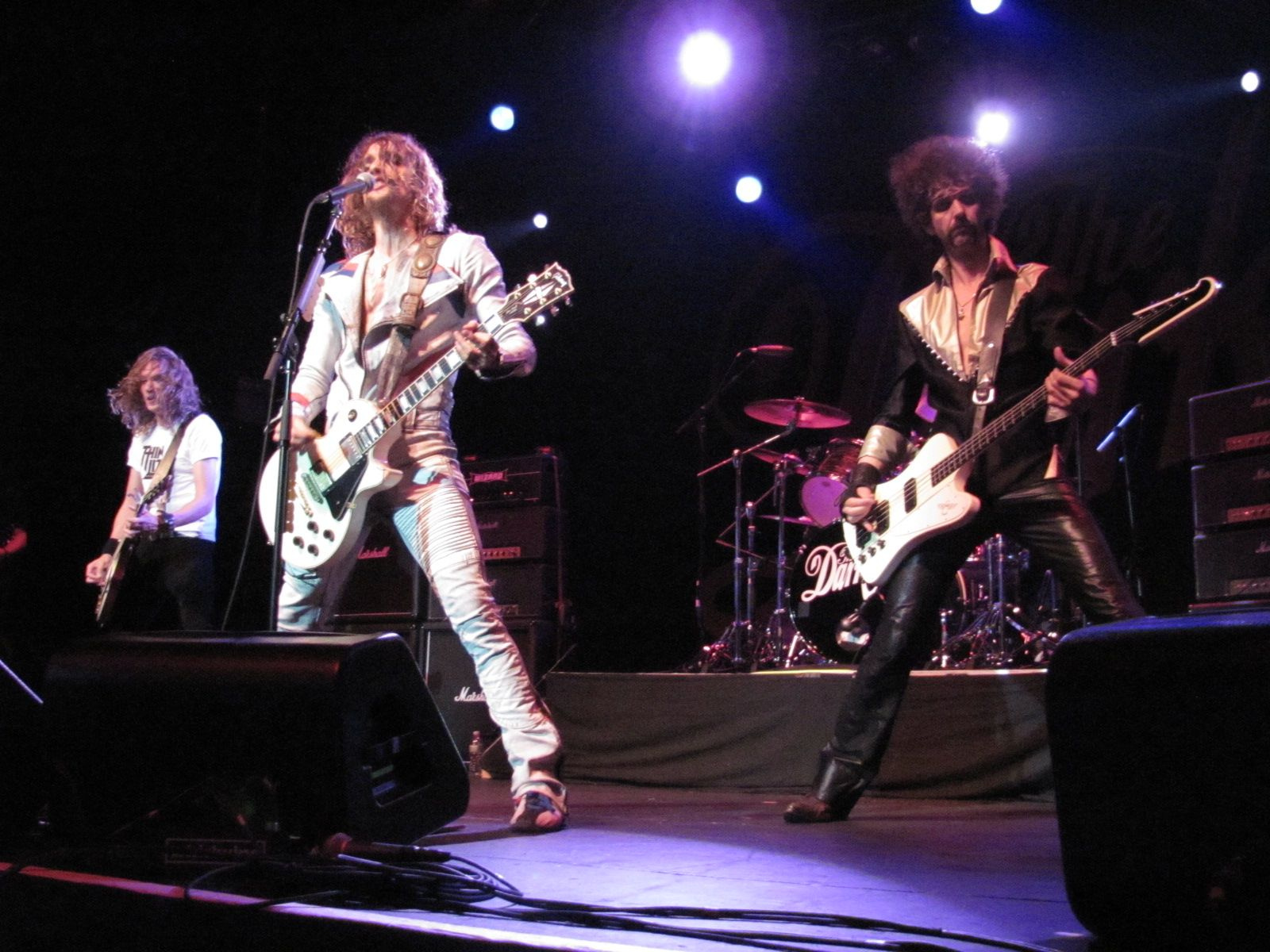
Three-category winners The Darkness received most nominations and awards

Artists that received multiple nominations
Nominations	Artist
4	The Darkness
3 (6)	Busted
3 (6)	Christina Aguilera
3 (6)	Daniel Bedingfield
3 (6)	Dido
3 (6)	Dizzee Rascal
3 (6)	Justin Timberlake
2 (12)	50 Cent
2 (12)	Amy Winehouse
2 (12)	Beyoncé
2 (12)	The Black Eyed Peas
2 (12)	The Coral
2 (12)	Jamelia
2 (12)	Kings of Leon
2 (12)	Lemar
2 (12)	Mis-Teeq
2 (12)	Outkast
2 (12)	Sean Paul
2 (12)	The White Stripes

Artists that received multiple awards
Awards	Artist
3	The Darkness
2 (3)	Busted
2 (3)	Dido
2 (3)	Justin Timberlake
