= Brit Awards 2003 =

British music awards ceremony

- Date: 20 February 2003
- Venue: Earls Court
- Hosted by: Davina McCall
- Most awards: Coldplay, Eminem and Ms. Dynamite (2)
- Most nominations: Ms. Dynamite and The Streets (4)

Television/radio coverage
- Network: ITV

Brit Awards 2003 was the 23rd edition of the annual Brit Awards pop music awards ceremony in the United Kingdom. It was organised by the British Phonographic Industry and took place on 20 February 2003 at Earls Court in London. British Newcomer and International Newcomer were renamed to British Breakthrough Act and International Breakthrough Act. This was the first year that the British Urban Act category was presented.

== Performances ==
Artist(s)	Song(s)
Avril Lavigne	"Sk8er Boi"
Blue	"Riders"
Coldplay	"Clocks"
David Gray	"The Other Side"
George Michael; Ms Dynamite	"Faith"
Justin Timberlake; Kylie Minogue	"Cry Me a River" "Like I Love You" "Rapture"
Liberty X	"Just a Little"
Pink	"Get the Party Started" "Just Like a Pill"
Sugababes	"Freak Like Me"
Sir Tom Jones	Medley of Hits

== Winners and nominees ==
British Album of the Year (presented by Justin Timberlake)	British Single of the Year (presented by Robin Gibb)
Coldplay – A Rush of Blood to the Head; Ms Dynamite – A Little Deeper; The Coral – The Coral; The Streets – Original Pirate Material; Sugababes – Angels with Dirty Faces	Liberty X – "Just a Little"; Atomic Kitten – "The Tide Is High"; Gareth Gates – "Anyone of Us (Stupid Mistake)"; Gareth Gates – "Unchained Melody"; Will Young – "Anything Is Possible"
British Male Solo Artist (presented by David Walliams and Matt Lucas)	British Female Solo Artist (presented by Vernon Kay)
Robbie Williams; Badly Drawn Boy; Craig David; David Gray; The Streets	Ms Dynamite; Sophie Ellis-Bextor; Beverley Knight; Alison Moyet; Beth Orton
British Group (presented by Jackie Chan and Owen Wilson)	British Breakthrough Act (presented by Sara Cox)
Coldplay; Blue; Doves; Sugababes; Oasis	Will Young; Liberty X; Ms Dynamite; The Coral; The Streets
British Dance Act (presented by Tess Daly)	British Pop Act (presented by Cat Deeley)
Sugababes; The Chemical Brothers; Groove Armada; Jamiroquai; Kosheen	Blue; Enrique Iglesias (Spain); Gareth Gates; Pink (United States); Will Young
British Urban Act (presented by Trevor Nelson)	International Album (presented by Rob Brydon)
Ms Dynamite; Beverley Knight; Big Brovaz; Craig David; Daniel Bedingfield; Mis-Teeq; MC Romeo; Roots Manuva; So Solid Crew; The Streets	Eminem – The Eminem Show; Norah Jones – Come Away with Me; Alicia Keys – Songs in A Minor; Pink – Missundaztood; Red Hot Chili Peppers – By the Way
International Male Solo Artist (presented by Natalie Imbruglia)	International Female Solo Artist (presented by Ben Elton)
Eminem; Beck; Moby; Nelly; Bruce Springsteen	Pink; Missy Elliott; Norah Jones; Alicia Keys; Avril Lavigne
International Group (presented by Denise van Outen)	International Breakthrough Act (presented by Mis-Teeq)
Red Hot Chili Peppers; Foo Fighters; Nickelback; Röyksopp; The White Stripes	Norah Jones; Avril Lavigne; Nickelback; Shakira; The White Stripes

=== Outstanding Contribution to Music ===
- Tom Jones

== Multiple nominations and awards ==
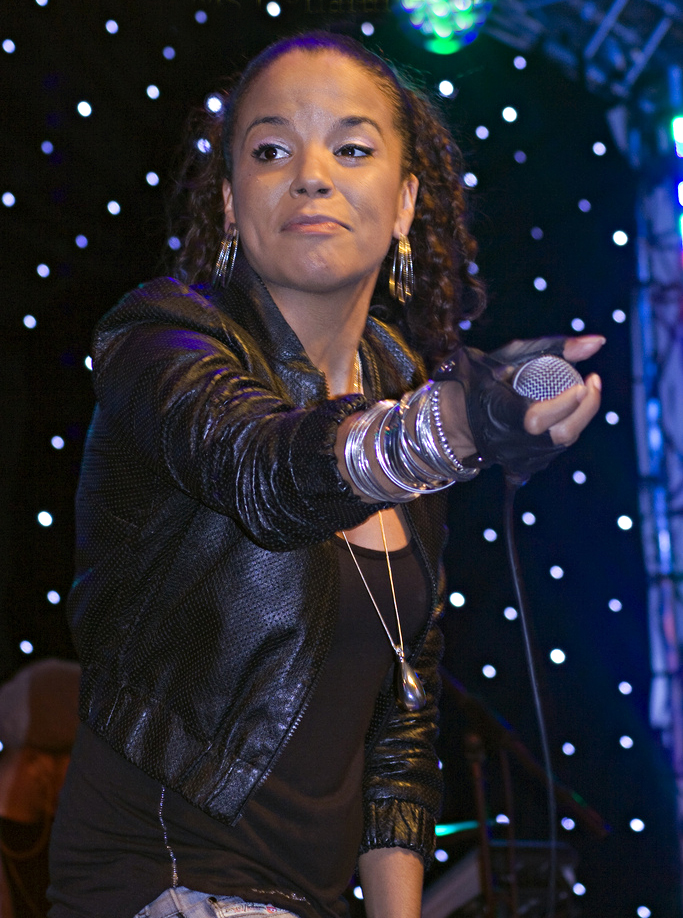
Two-time winner Ms. Dynamite as most nominations and awards

Artists that received multiple nominations
Nominations	Artist
4 (2)	Ms. Dynamite
4 (2)	The Streets
3 (5)	Gareth Gates
3 (5)	Norah Jones
3 (5)	Pink
3 (5)	Sugababes
3 (5)	Will Young
2 (11)	Alicia Keys
2 (11)	Avril Lavigne
2 (11)	Blue
2 (11)	Coldplay
2 (11)	The Coral
2 (11)	Craig David
2 (11)	Eminem
2 (11)	Liberty X
2 (11)	Nickelback
2 (11)	Red Hot Chili Peppers
2 (11)	The White Stripes

Artists that received multiple awards
Awards	Artist
2 (3)	Coldplay
2 (3)	Eminem
2 (3)	Ms. Dynamite
