= Brit Awards 2024 =

British music awards ceremony

- Date: 2 March 2024
- Location: The O2 Arena
- Hosted by: Clara Amfo; Maya Jama; Roman Kemp

Highlights
- Most awards: Raye (6)
- Most nominations: Raye (7)
- Website: brits.co.uk

Television/radio coverage
- Network: ITV, ITV2 and ITVX (United Kingdom); YouTube (outside United Kingdom)

The Brit Awards 2024 was the 44th edition of the Brit Awards ceremony presented by British Phonographic Industry (BPI), and was held on Saturday 2 March 2024 at The O2 Arena in London. The ceremony returned to a weekend due to successful viewership for the 2023 ceremony, which was held on a weekend for the first time. It also returned to March for the first time since the 2000 ceremony. After hosting the ceremony for two consecutive years, Mo Gilligan announced that he would no longer be hosting the ceremony. The event was hosted by Clara Amfo, Maya Jama and Roman Kemp.

For this year's ceremony, Raye received the most nominations with seven in total, breaking the record for the most nominations received by a single artist in a year. British rappers Central Cee and J Hus tied for second with four each. Raye would go on to win a record-breaking 6 awards, making history with the most wins by a single artist in one night.

== Background ==
For the 2024 awards, there were two major category changes:

- The number of nominees in the British Artist of the Year and International Artist of the Year has increased from five to ten.
- The British Pop/R&B Act category will be split into British Pop Act and British R&B Act. The winners in both categories, as well as the three other genre categories, will be decided by a public vote via Instagram.

The 2024 Brit Award statue was designed by Rachel Jones.

=== Brits Week 2024 ===
In order to promote the awards ceremony and support the charity War Child, the BPI hosted a number of gigs around the country as part of Brits Week Artists performing as part of Brits Week included:

- Cian Ducrot at Union Chapel, London (19 February)
- You Me at Six at Concorde 2, Brighton (19 February)
- Keane at Shepherd's Bush Empire, London (20 February)
- Ash at 100 Club, London (21 February)
- Baby Queen at Lafayette, London (21 February)
- Aitch at Shepherd's Bush Empire, London (21 February)
- Pendulum at HERE at Outernet, London (23 February)
- Aurora at Lafayette, London (26 February)
- Gabriels at Ronnie Scott's Jazz Club, London (27 February)
- Sleaford Mods at Scala, London (28 February)
- CMAT at Bush Hall, London (1 March)
- Venbee at Omeara, London (1 March)
- The Last Dinner Party at The Trades Club, Hebden Bridge (4 March)

=== Presenters ===
Hosts of the 2024 Brit Awards

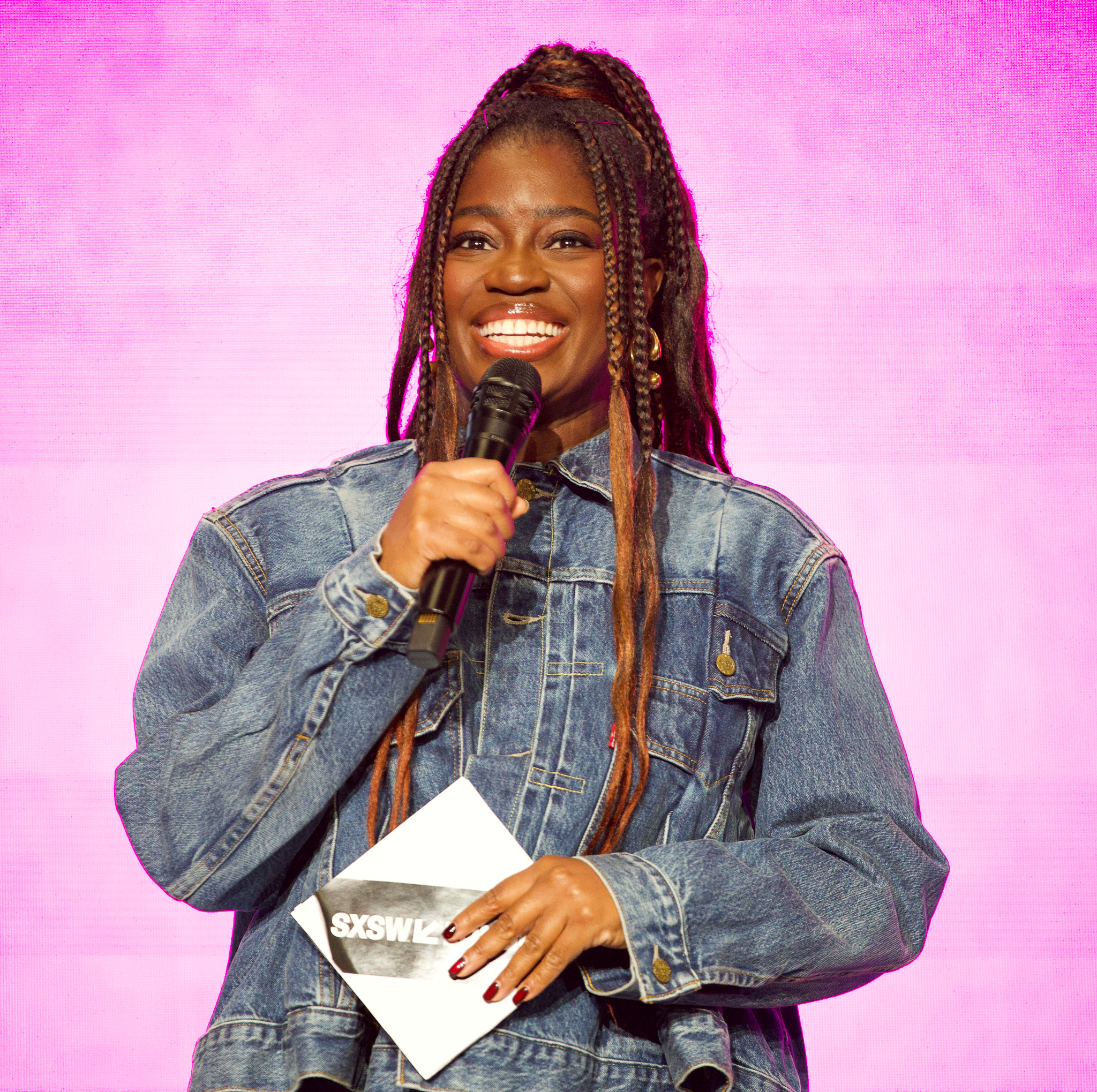
Clara Amfo

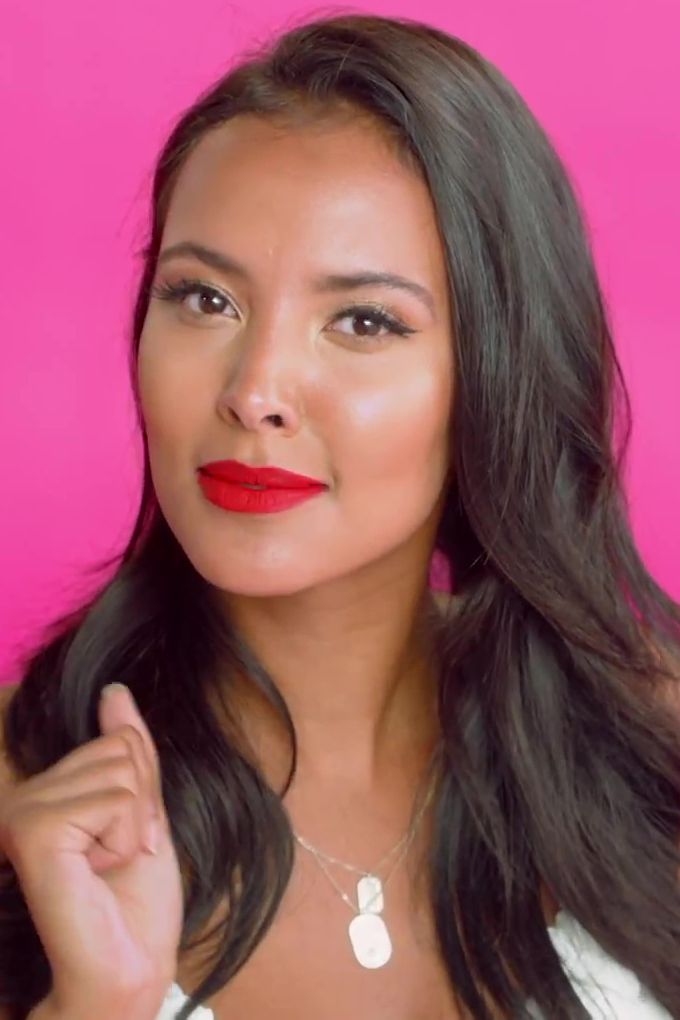
Maya Jama

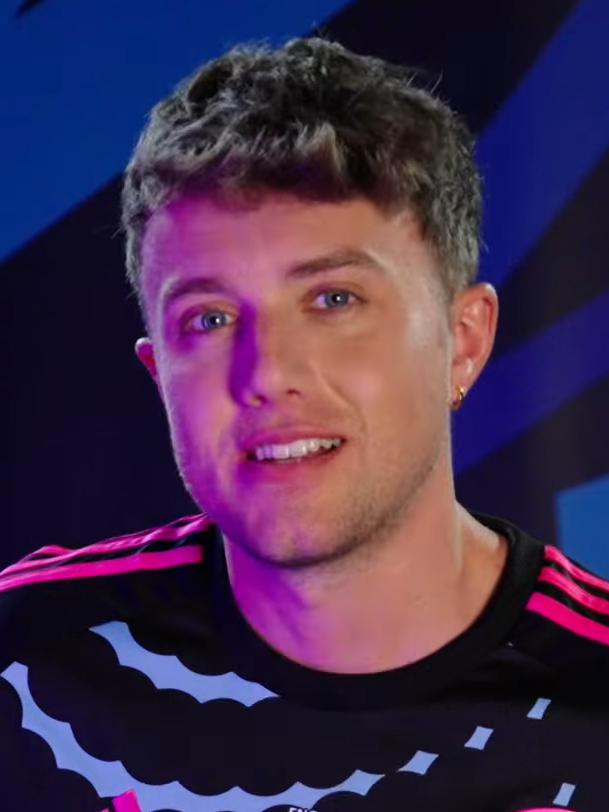
Roman Kemp

On 1 February 2024, it was announced that BBC Radio 1 DJ Clara Amfo, Love Island host Maya Jama and former Capital Breakfast lead host Roman Kemp would co-host the ceremony. All three co-hosted the Red Carpet pre-show on ITV2 preceding last year's ceremony.

Clara said about hosting the Brits for the first time: "Hosting The BRITs is a bucket list job, I'm so very honoured and excited for this year's show. Throughout my career I've been so lucky to witness the growth of this year's nominees and performers and I know its gonna be another special one. I can't wait to hit the stage with Maya [Jama] and Roman [Kemp] to celebrate these amazing artists at The O2!". Maya then said: "I'm really excited to be hosting The BRIT Awards alongside Clara [Amfo] and Roman [Kemp]. I've worked alongside the incredible team at the BRITs for years now and its something I always watched, and wanted to be part of, growing up - so it's amazing to be on the stage this year hosting it! It's always one of the best nights of the year for me and a real celebration of British music, culture and talent". Roman then finished by saying: "This is a real pinch me moment! Hosting The BRIT Awards - what an honour. I remember watching The BRITs on TV when I was growing up so to be asked to host this year's awards, is a dream come true. It's going to be a privilege to share the stage with so many talented artists and to celebrate the incredible achievements of all the nominees and winners this year. See you there".

Damian Christian, Managing Director and President of Promotions at Atlantic Records (part of Warner Music UK) and Chair of The BRIT committee for 2024 said: "I'm delighted that three of the country's most renowned and talented entertainment personalities will be taking on the hosting role this year. I've admired Maya's work for years and have worked closely with Clara and Roman throughout their careers. All three are real music people and will bring their own unique humour, charm and vision to what is sure to be a great night".

Katie Rawcliffe, ITV Head of Entertainment Commissioning added: "Clara, Maya and Roman are an exceptional trio and it is fantastic to have them all at the helm for this year's BRIT Awards. The show remains hugely popular, particularly amongst our 16-34 audience, and we look forward to another epic celebration of music".

The red carpet and after show were broadcast on ITV2 and ITVX respectively and presented by Jack Saunders and Yinka Bokinni.

== Performers ==
=== Main ceremony ===
On 24 January 2024, Dua Lipa was the first artist confirmed to perform at the ceremony. On 30 January, Raye was announced as the second performer. On 12 February, Kylie Minogue was announced as the recipient of the 2024 Global Icon Award, and was revealed to be performing at the ceremony. Discussing the award, Minogue stated "I am beyond thrilled to be honoured with the Global Icon Award and to be joining a roll call of such incredible artists. The UK has always been a home from home so the BRITs have a very special place in my heart. I have some amazing memories from the awards over the years and I can't wait to be back on the BRITs stage. See you at the O2!" Rema and Jungle were announced as performers on 15 February. A further announcement was made on 16 February confirming Becky Hill and dance duo Chase & Status will also be performing on the night. On 20 February, Calvin Harris and Ellie Goulding were announced to be joining the list of performers. On the 22 February, just nine days before the ceremony, the performer lineup was complete with the addition of Canadian singer, Tate McRae.

List of performers
Artist(s)	Song(s)	UK Singles Chart reaction (week ending 14 March 2024)	UK Albums Chart reaction (week ending 14 March 2024)
Dua Lipa	"Training Season"	8 (+/-)	Dua Lipa - 71 (+6); Future Nostalgia - 83 (+7)
Calvin Harris Ellie Goulding	"Miracle"	—N/a	—N/a
Tate McRae	"Greedy"	22 (+10)	—N/a
Jungle	"Back on 74"	—N/a	—N/a
Raye	"Ice Cream Man" "Prada" "Genesis" "Escapism"	N/A; 18 (+9); N/A; 13 (re-entry)	My 21st Century Blues - 5 (re-entry)
Becky Hill Chase & Status	"Disconnect" (with elements of "Baddadan" with Irah and Takura)	67 (+ 29)	—N/a
Rema	"Calm Down"	—N/a	—N/a
Kylie Minogue	"Padam Padam" "Can't Get You Out of My Head" "Love at First Sight" "All the Lovers (with elements of "Spinning Around" and "Slow")	—N/a	—N/a

== Winners and nominees ==
The Rising Star shortlist was revealed on 28 November 2023. The complete list of nominees was announced on 24 January 2024. Winners appear first and are highlighted in bold.

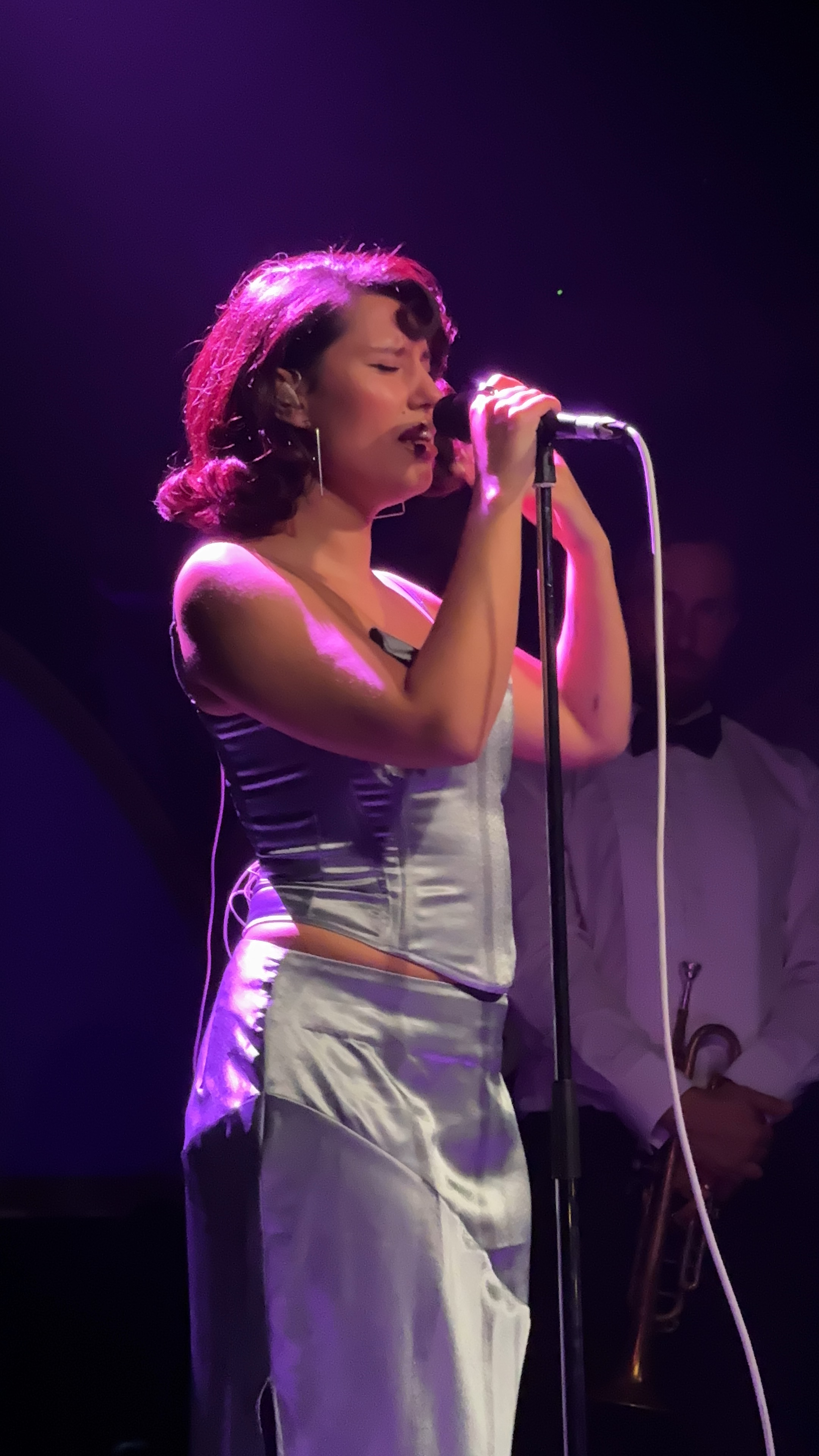
Raye, became the first female recipient to win Songwriter of the Year and broke the record for the most nominations and wins for a single artist in a year.

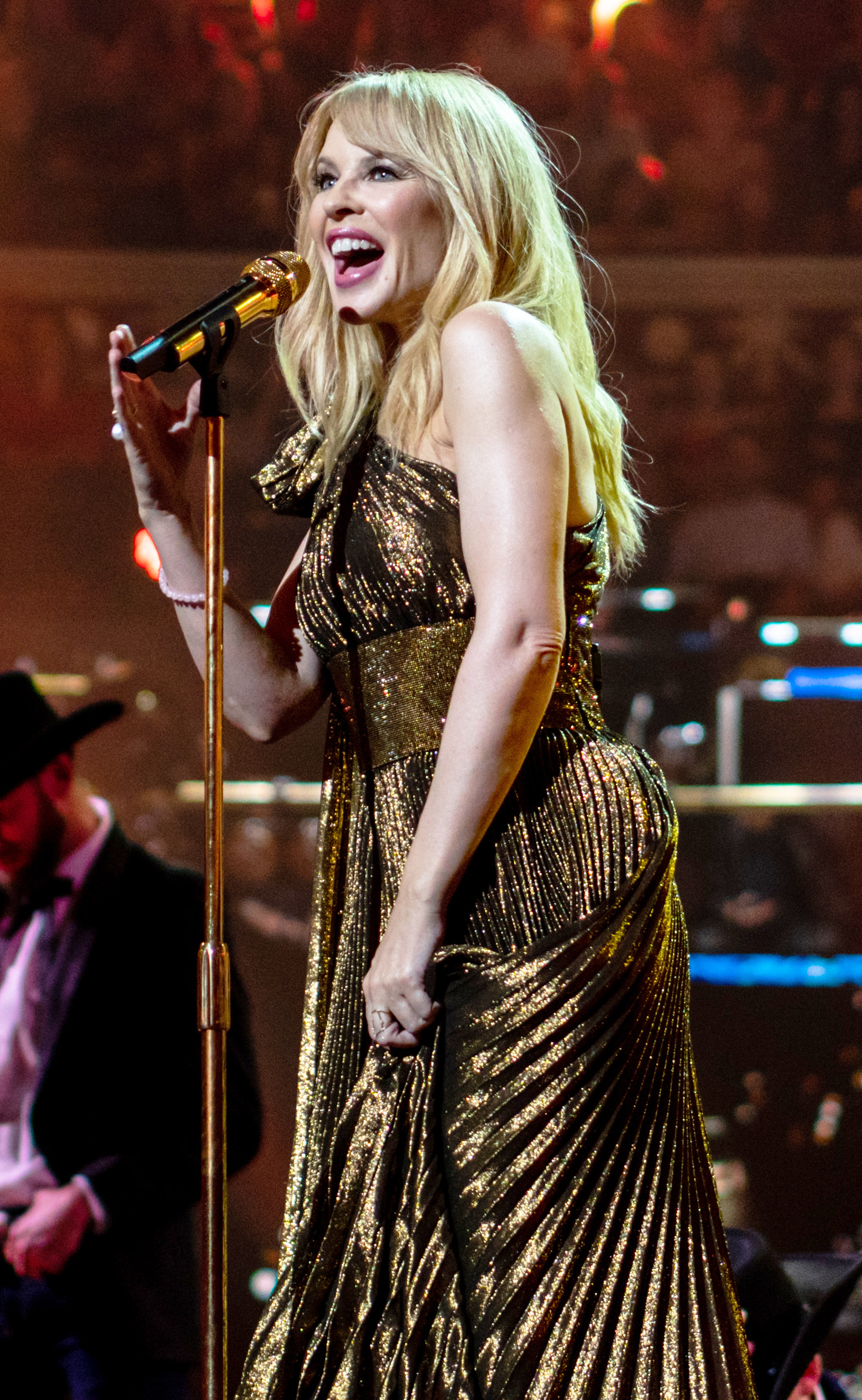
Kylie Minogue, Brits Global Icon Award honoree.

British Album of the Year (presented by Jaime Winstone and Stuart Worden)	Song of the Year (presented by Monica Dolan and Jo Hamilton)
**Raye – My 21st Century Blues**; Blur – The Ballad of Darren; J Hus – Beautiful and Brutal Yard; Little Simz – No Thank You; Young Fathers – Heavy Heavy	**Raye featuring 070 Shake – "Escapism"**; Calvin Harris and Ellie Goulding – "Miracle"; Cassö, Raye and D-Block Europe – "Prada"; Central Cee – "Let Go"; Dave and Central Cee – "Sprinter"; Dua Lipa – "Dance the Night"; Ed Sheeran – "Eyes Closed"; J Hus featuring Drake – "Who Told You"; Kenya Grace – "Strangers"; Lewis Capaldi – "Wish You the Best"; PinkPantheress – "Boy's a Liar"; Rudimental, Charlotte Plank and Vibe Chemistry – "Dancing Is Healing"; Stormzy featuring Debbie – "Firebabe"; Switch Disco and Ella Henderson – "React"; Venbee and Goddard. – "Messy in Heaven"
British Artist of the Year (presented by Jonathan Bailey)	British Group (presented by Green Day)
**Raye**; Arlo Parks; Central Cee; Dave; Dua Lipa; Fred Again; J Hus; Jessie Ware; Little Simz; Olivia Dean	**Jungle**; Blur; Chase & Status; Headie One & K-Trap; Young Fathers
Best Pop Act (presented by Peter Crouch and Abbey Clancy)	Best R&B Act (presented by Jess Glynne and Aitch)
**Dua Lipa**; Calvin Harris; Charli XCX; Olivia Dean; Raye	**Raye**; Cleo Sol; Jorja Smith; Mahalia; Sault
Best Dance Act (presented by Alison Oliver and Charli XCX)	Best Rock/Alternative Act (presented by Luke Evans and Marisa Abela)
**Calvin Harris**; Barry Can't Swim; Becky Hill; Fred Again; Romy	**Bring Me the Horizon**; Blur; The Rolling Stones; Young Fathers; Yussef Dayes
Best Hip Hop/Grime/Rap Act (presented by Kingsley Ben-Adir and Ashley Walters)	Best New Artist (presented by Joe Keery)
**Casisdead**; Central Cee; Dave; J Hus; Little Simz	**Raye**; Mahalia; Olivia Dean; PinkPantheress; Yussef Dayes
International Artist of the Year (presented by Joanne Froggatt)	International Group of the Year (presented by Yinka Bokinni and Jack Saunders)
**SZA**; Asake; Burna Boy; Caroline Polachek; CMAT; Kylie Minogue; Lana Del Rey; Miley Cyrus; Olivia Rodrigo; Taylor Swift	**Boygenius**; Blink-182; Foo Fighters; Gabriels; Paramore
Best International Song (presented by Rob Beckett and Bimini Bon-Boulash)	Rising Star
**Miley Cyrus – "Flowers"**; Billie Eilish – "What Was I Made For?"; David Kushner – "Daylight"; Doja Cat – "Paint the Town Red"; Jazzy – "Giving Me"; Libianca – "People"; Meghan Trainor – "Made You Look"; Noah Kahan – "Stick Season"; Oliver Tree and Robin Schulz – "Miss You"; Olivia Rodrigo – "Vampire"; Peggy Gou – "(It Goes Like) Nanana"; Rema – "Calm Down"; SZA – "Kill Bill"; Tate McRae – "Greedy"; Tyla – "Water"	**The Last Dinner Party**; Caity Baser; Sekou
Songwriter of the Year (presented by Clara Amfo)
**Raye**
Producer of the Year (presented by Vick Hope and Ivan Toney)
**Chase & Status**
Global Icon Award (presented by Dua Lipa)
**Kylie Minogue**

== Multiple nominations and awards ==
Artists who received multiple nominations
Nominations	Artist
7	Raye
4	Central Cee
4	J Hus
3	Blur
3	Calvin Harris
3	Dave
3	Dua Lipa
3	Little Simz
3	Olivia Dean
3	Young Fathers
2	Fred Again
2	Miley Cyrus
2	Mimi Webb
2	Olivia Rodrigo
2	PinkPantheress
2	SZA
2	Yussef Dayes

Artists who received multiple awards
Wins	Artist
6	Raye
