= Brit Award for British Dance Act =

British music award

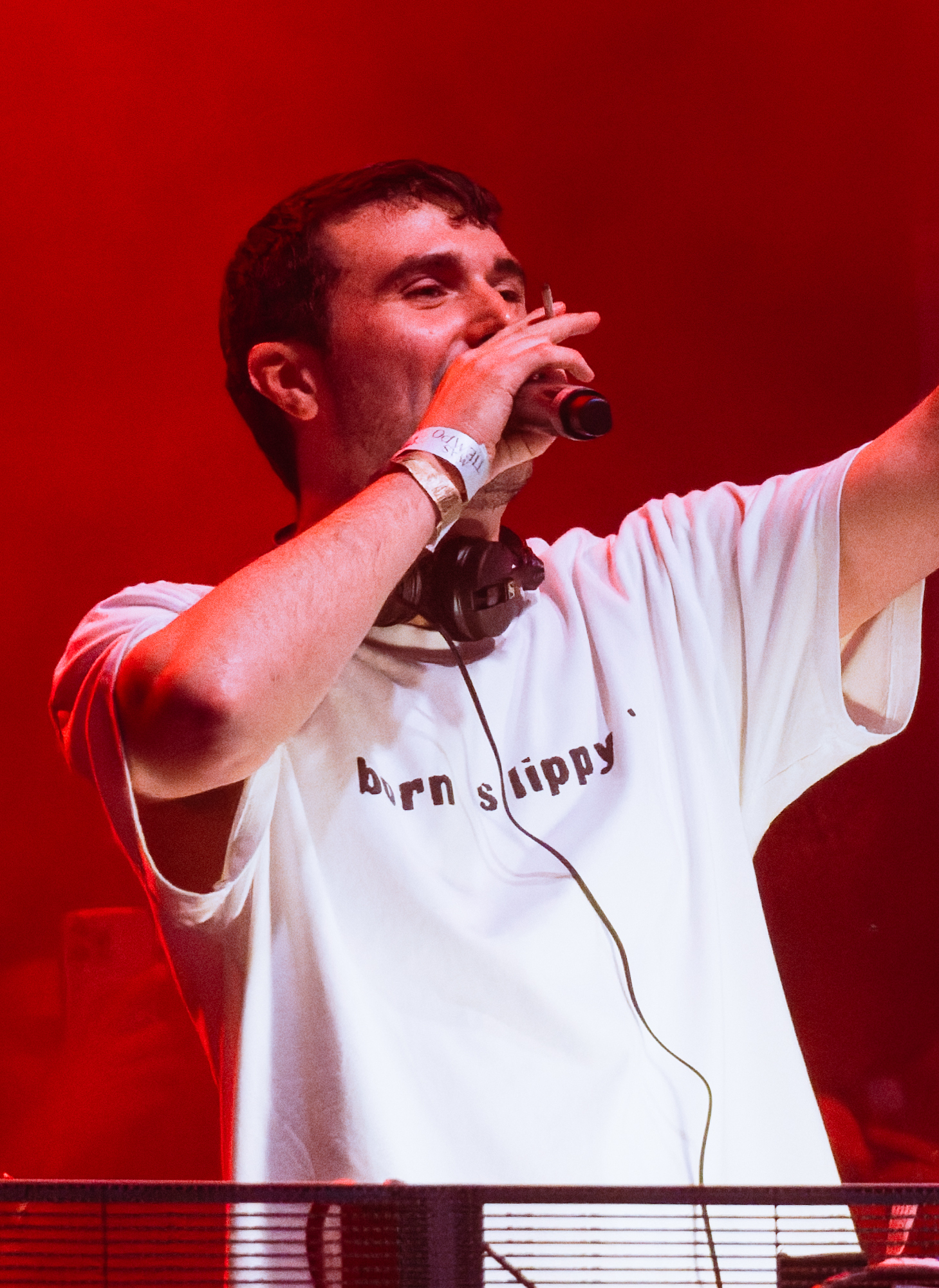
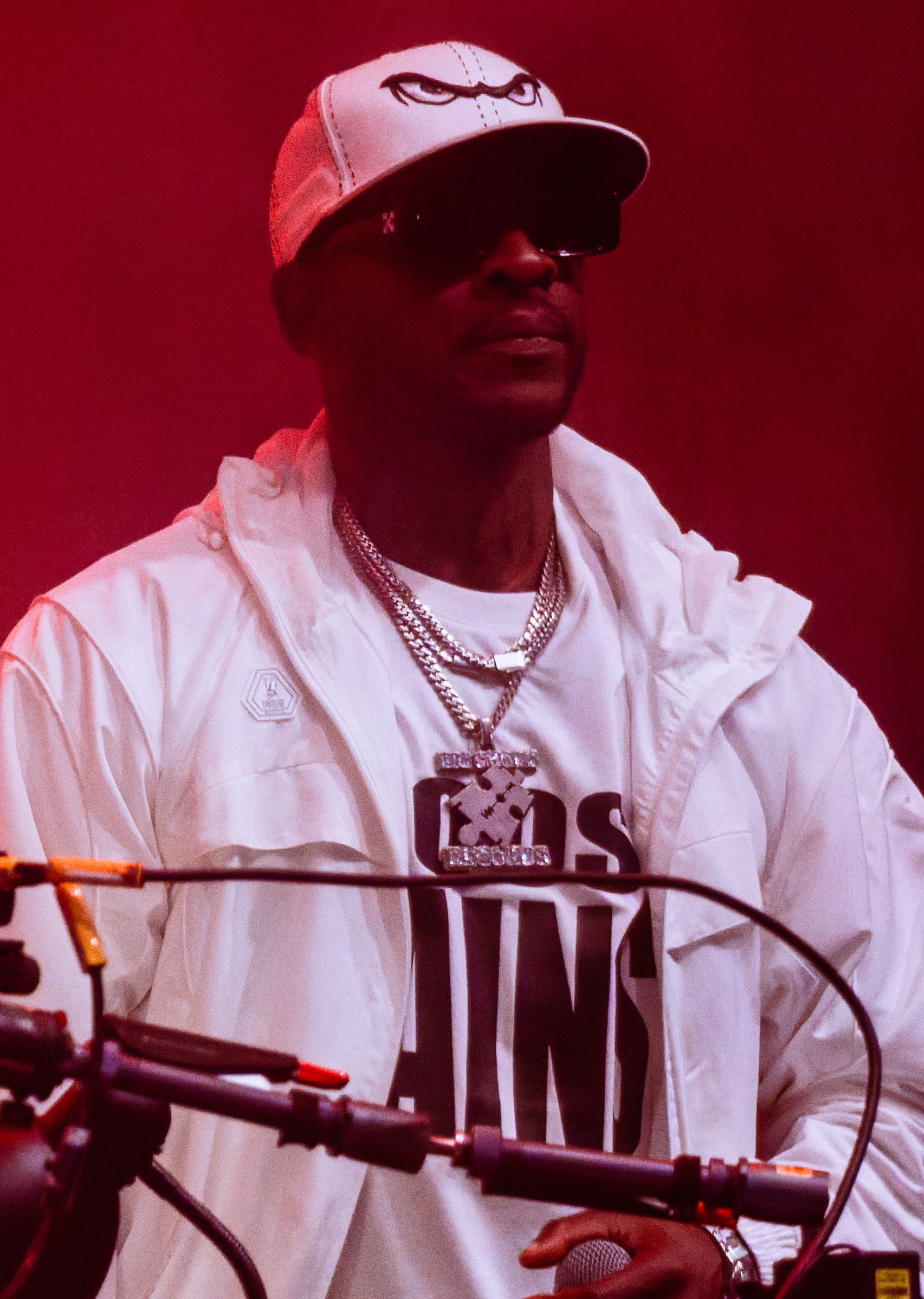
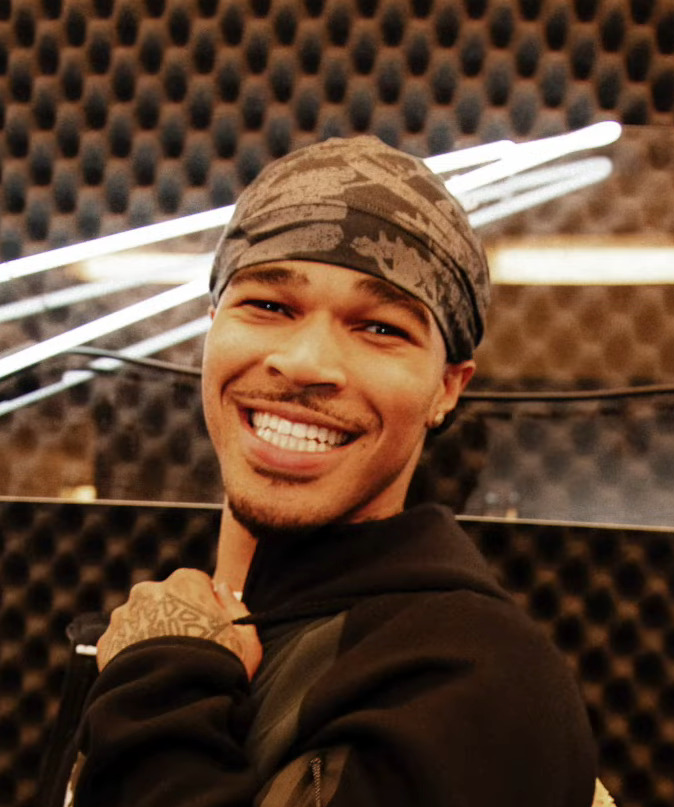
- 2026 winners, from left to right: Fred Again, Skepta and PlaqueBoyMax
- Awarded for: Achievement in Excellent British Dance Act
- Country: United Kingdom (UK)
- Presented by: British Phonographic Industry (BPI)
- First award: 1994
- Currently held by: Fred Again, Skepta and PlaqueBoyMax (2026)

Highlights
- Most awards: Basement Jaxx; Becky Hill; Fatboy Slim; M People; The Prodigy (2 each)
- Most nominations: Jamiroquai (6)
- Website: www.brits.co.uk

The Brit Award for British Dance Act is an award given by the British Phonographic Industry (BPI), an organisation which represents record companies and artists in the United Kingdom. The accolade was presented at the Brit Awards, an annual celebration of British and international music. The winners and nominees were determined by the Brit Awards voting academy with over one-thousand members comprising record labels, publishers, managers, agents, media, and previous winners and nominees.

The inaugural recipients of the award are M People, who won consecutively in 1994 and 1995. Fatboy Slim was the first solo act to win the category in 1999 and is one of five acts to have won the award twice, alongside M People, The Prodigy, Basement Jaxx and Becky Hill. Jamiroquai hold the record for most nominations without a win, with six. The current holders of the award are Fred Again, Skepta and American rapper PlaqueBoyMax, the first non-British nominee, who won in 2026.

== History ==
The award was first presented in 1994. British Dance Act has been won by M People, The Prodigy, Fatboy Slim, Basement Jaxx and Becky Hill the most times, with two wins each.

In 2021, it was announced that the category had been revived following the removal of gendered awards and was first presented at the 42nd Brit Awards. This new iteration is voted for by the public on TikTok alongside the three other genre categories (Pop/R&B Act, Rock/Alternative Act and Hip Hop/Grime/Rap Act) In 2026, two of the five nominations were jointly held by multiple acts: Calvin Harris and Clementine Douglas, as well as eventual winners Fred Again, Skepta, and American rapper PlaqueBoyMax, with the latter becoming the first non-British nominee.

== Winners and nominees ==
=== Original category (1994-2004) ===
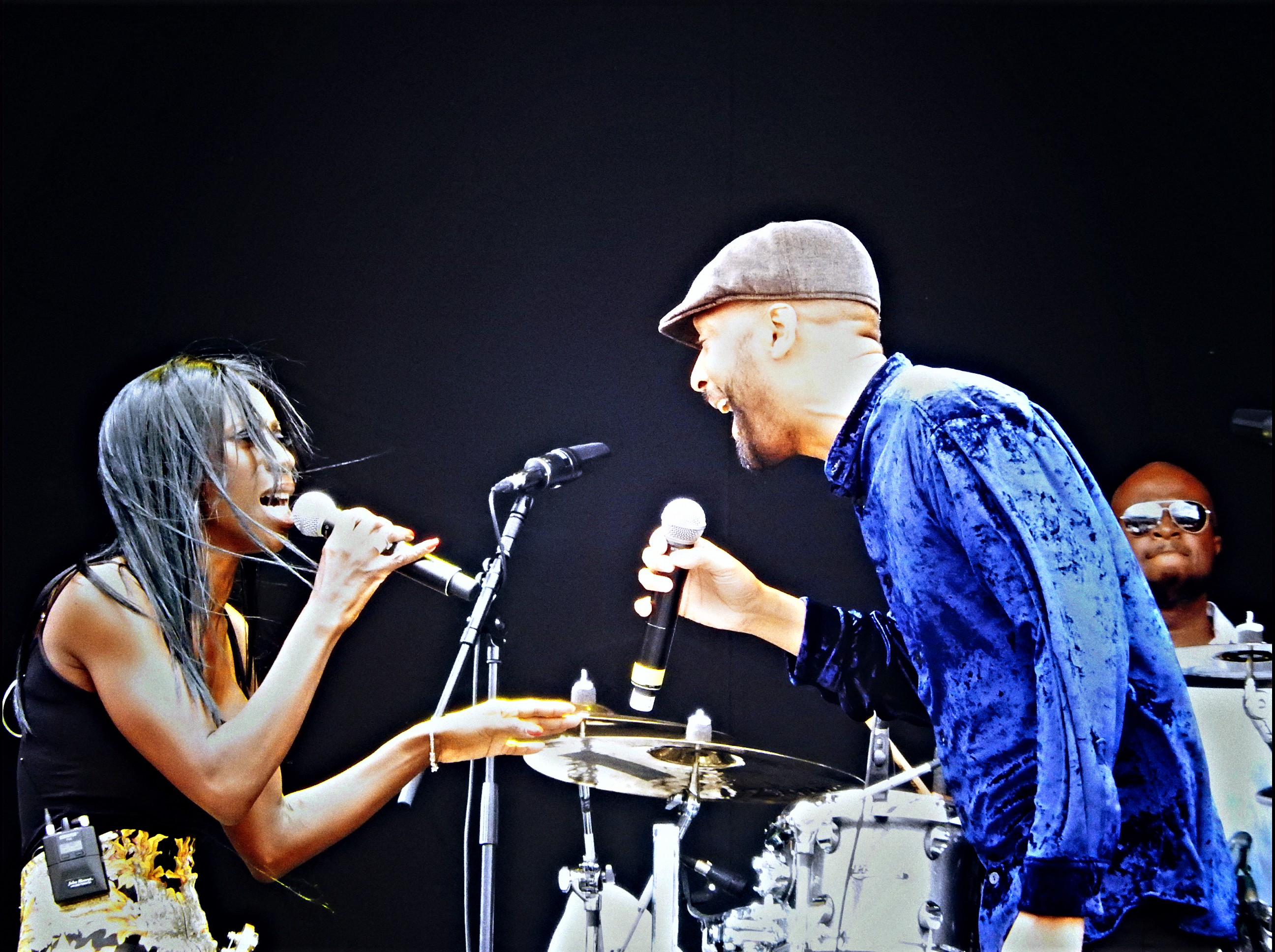
Inaugural and two-time winners M People

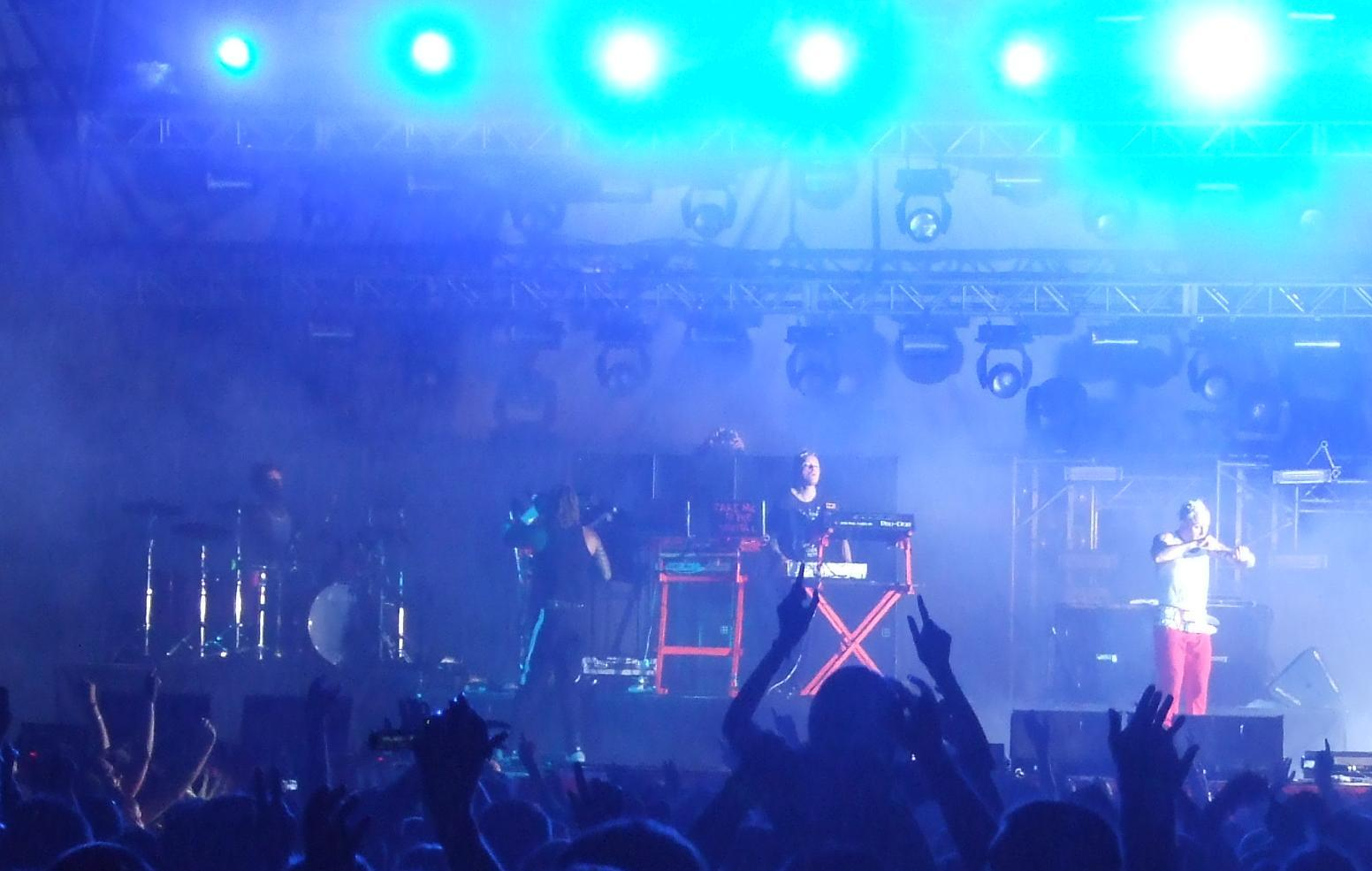
Two-time winners The Prodigy

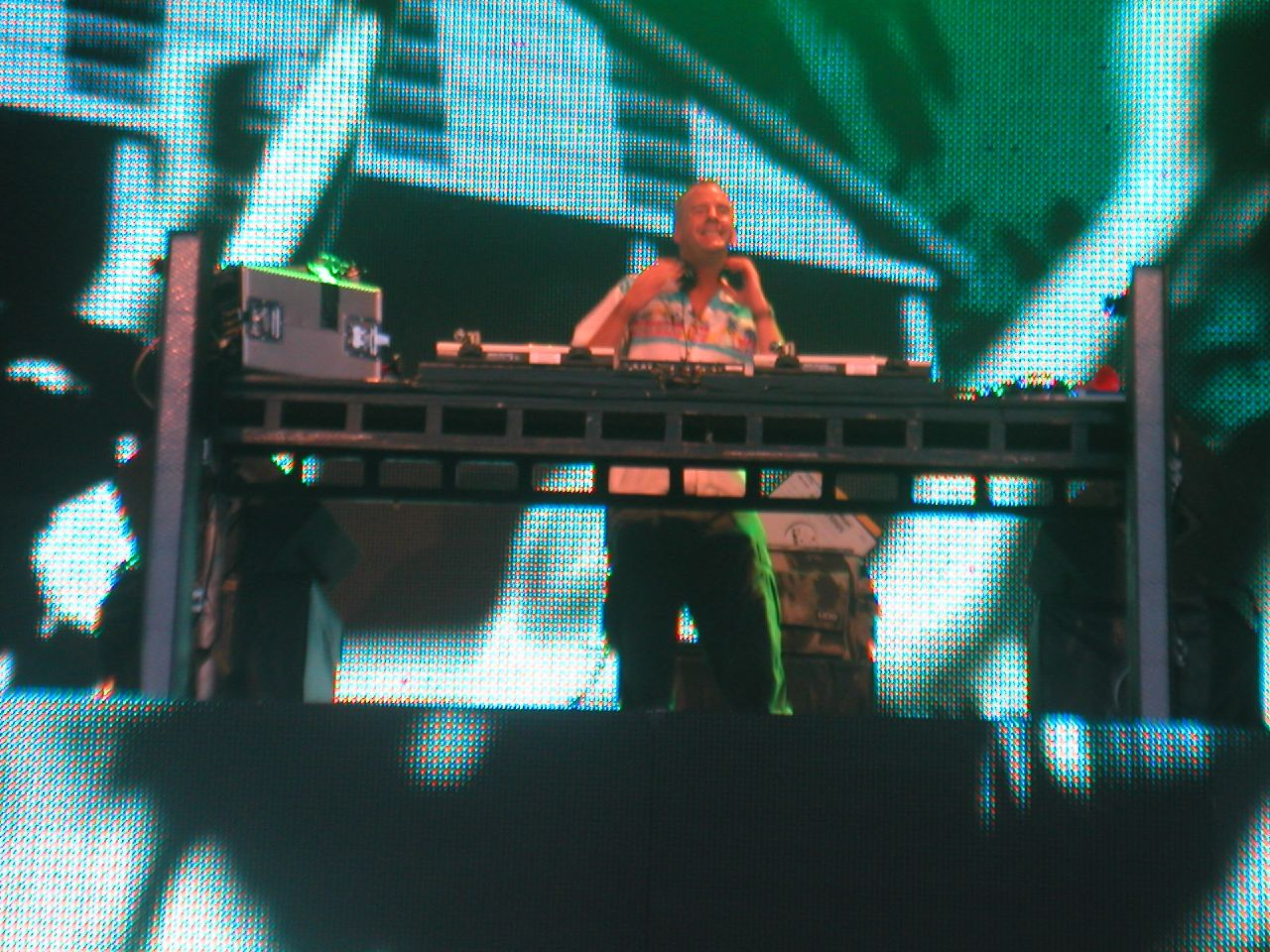
Two-time winner Fatboy Slim was the first solo artist to receive the award

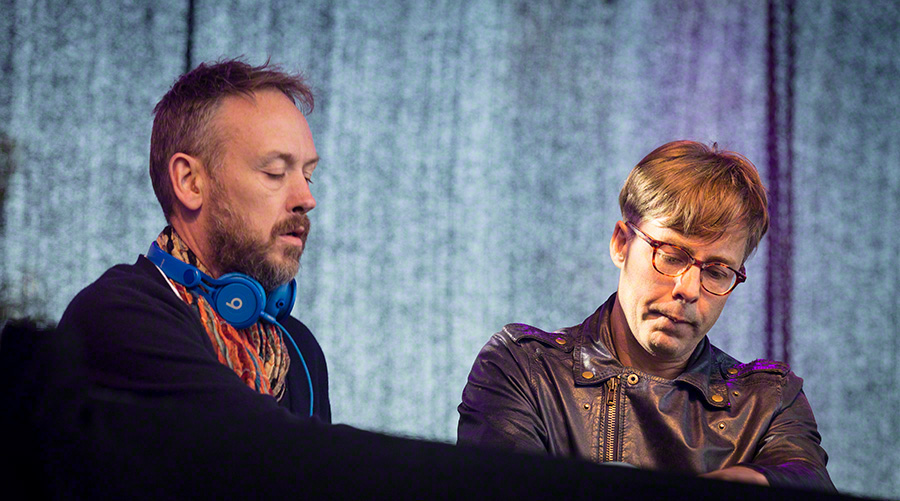
Two-time winners Basement Jaxx

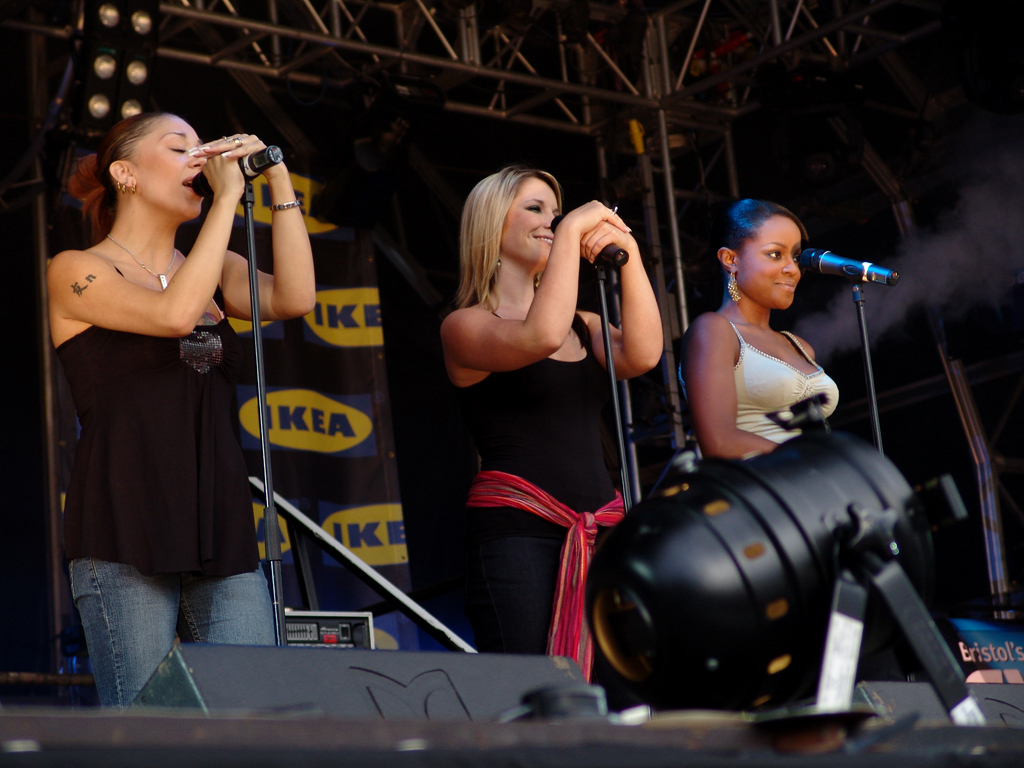
Sugababes became the first female group to win the award in 2003

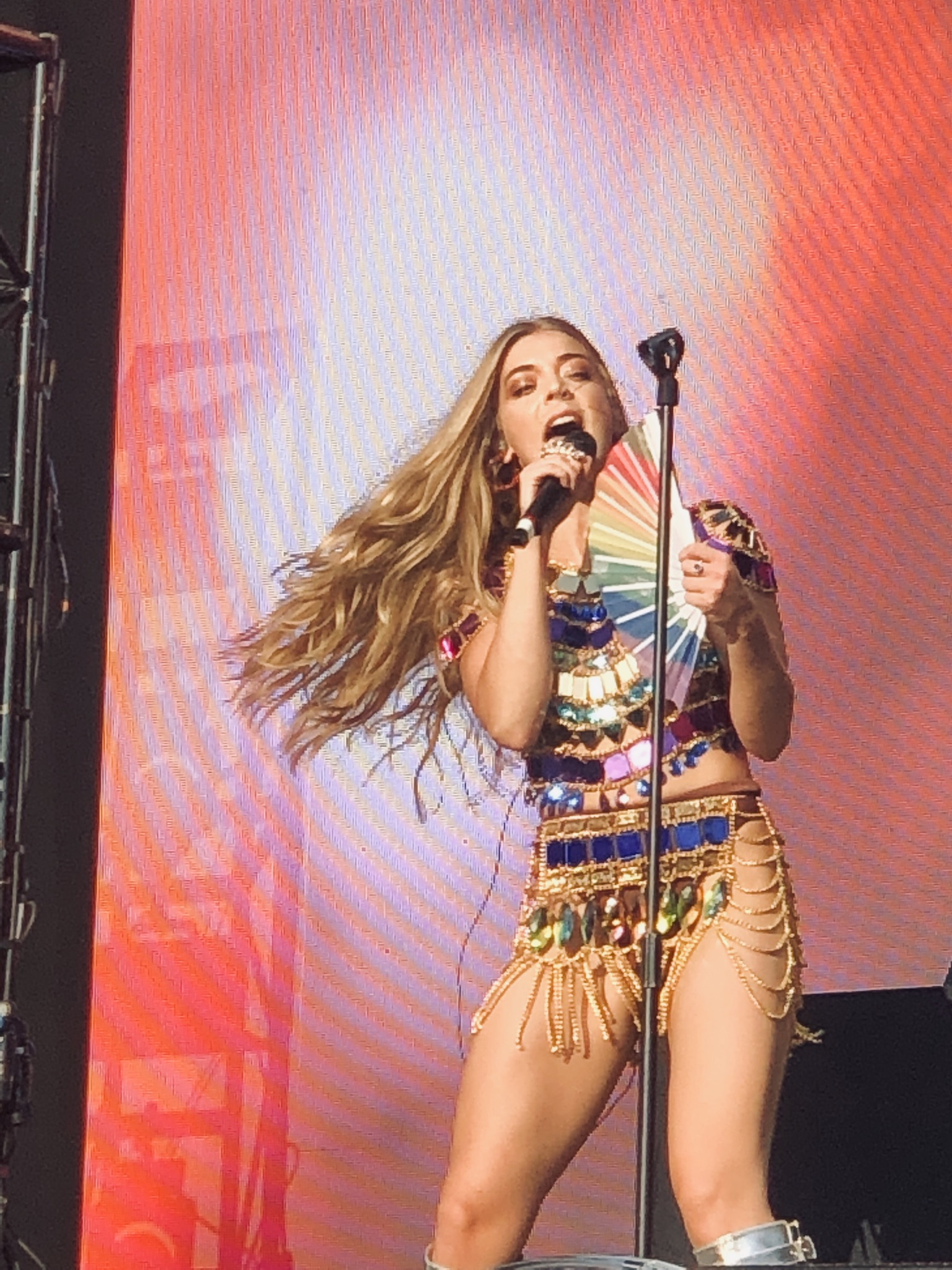
Two-time winner and first solo female act to receive the award, Becky Hill

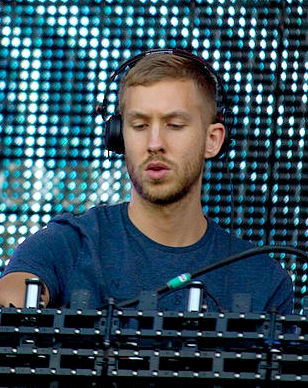
Calvin Harris received the award in 2024 following two previous nominations

Year	Recipient	Nominees
1994	M People	Apache Indian; Jamiroquai; The Shamen; Stereo MCs
1995	M People	The Brand New Heavies; Eternal; Massive Attack; The Prodigy
1996	Massive Attack	Eternal; Leftfield; M People; Tricky
1997	The Prodigy	The Chemical Brothers; Jamiroquai; Mark Morrison; Underworld
1998	The Prodigy	The Brand New Heavies; The Chemical Brothers; Eternal; Jamiroquai
1999	Fatboy Slim	All Saints; Faithless; Jamiroquai; Massive Attack
2000	The Chemical Brothers	Basement Jaxx; Fatboy Slim; Jamiroquai; Leftfield
2001	Fatboy Slim	Artful Dodger; Craig David; Moloko; Sonique
2002	Basement Jaxx	Craig David; Faithless; Fatboy Slim; Gorillaz
2003	Sugababes	The Chemical Brothers; Groove Armada; Jamiroquai; Kosheen
2004	Basement Jaxx	Goldfrapp; Groove Armada; Kosheen; Girls Aloud

=== Revived category (2022-present) ===
Year	Recipient	Nominees
2022	Becky Hill	Calvin Harris; Fred Again; Joel Corry; Raye
2023	Becky Hill	Bonobo; Calvin Harris; Eliza Rose; Fred Again
2024	Calvin Harris	Barry Can't Swim; Becky Hill; Fred Again; Romy
2025	Charli XCX	Becky Hill; Chase & Status; Fred Again; Nia Archives
2026	Fred Again, Skepta, & PlaqueBoyMax	Calvin Harris & Clementine Douglas; FKA Twigs; PinkPantheress; Sammy Virji

== Multiple nominations and awards ==
Artists that received multiple nominations
Nominations	Artist
6	Jamiroquai
5	Fred Again
4	Becky Hill
4	The Chemical Brothers
4	Fatboy Slim
4	Calvin Harris
3	Basement Jaxx
3	Eternal
3	Massive Attack
3	M People
3	The Prodigy
2	The Brand New Heavies
2	Craig David
2	Faithless
2	Groove Armada
2	Kosheen
2	Leftfield

Artists that received multiple awards
Awards	Artist
2	Basement Jaxx
2	Becky Hill
2	Fatboy Slim
2	M People
2	The Prodigy
