= List of UK Independent Albums Chart number ones of 2021 =

These are the Official Charts Company's UK Independent Albums Chart number ones of 2021.

== Chart history ==
Issue date	Album	Artist(s)	Record label	Ref.
1 January	Disco	Kylie Minogue	BMG	
8 January	Songs from the Kitchen Disco	Sophie Ellis-Bextor	Cooking Vinyl	
15 January	Songs for the Drunk and Broken Hearted	Passenger	Cooking Vinyl	
22 January	Suckapunch	You Me at Six	Underdog	
29 January	Isles	Bicep	Ninja Tune	
5 February	Collapsed in Sunbeams	Arlo Parks	Transgressive	
12 February	For the First Time	Black Country, New Road	Ninja Tune	
19 February	Who Am I?	Pale Waves	Dirty Hit	
26 February	As the Love Continues	Mogwai	Rock Action	
5 March	Nature Always Wins	Maxïmo Park	Prolifica	
12 March	Do It Again	Gabrielle	BMG	
19 March	All the Right Noises	Thunder	BMG	
26 March	Written & Directed	Black Honey	FoxFive	
2 April	Promises	Floating Points/Pharoah Sanders and London Symphony Orchestra	Luaka Bop	
9 April	New Long Leg	Dry Cleaning	4AD	
16 April	New Long Leg	Dry Cleaning	4AD	
23 April	Flu Game	AJ Tracey	Revenge	
30 April	Too Much Pressure	The Selecter	Chrysalis	
7 May	Coral Island	The Coral	Run On	
14 May	Bright Green Field	Squid	Warp	
21 May	The Ides of March	Myles Kennedy	Napalm	
28 May	Intruder	Gary Numan	BMG	
4 June	Hi	Texas	BMG	
11 June	Blue Weekend	Wolf Alice	Dirty Hit	
18 June	Back the Way We Came: Vol. 1 (2011–2021)	Noel Gallagher's High Flying Birds	Sour Mash	
25 June	Back the Way We Came: Vol. 1 (2011–2021)	Noel Gallagher's High Flying Birds	Sour Mash	
2 July	Boy From Michigan	John Grant	Bella Union	
9 July	Back the Way We Came: Vol. 1 (2011–2021)	Noel Gallagher's High Flying Birds	Sour Mash	
16 July	The Optimist	Turin Brakes	Two-Piers	
23 July	All Over the Place	KSI	BMG	
30 July	Downhill from Everywhere	Jackson Browne	Inside	
6 August	10	The Overtones	Hurricane	
13 August	Crying on the Bathroom Floor	Will Young	Cooking Vinyl	
20 August	Loving in Stereo	Jungle	Caiola	
27 August	Woman On the Internet	Orla Gartland	New Friends	
3 September	Posh Pop	Toyah	Edsel	
10 September	Sometimes I Might Be Introvert	Little Simz	Age 101	
17 September	What the Future Holds Pt. 2	Steps	BMG	
24 September	What the Future Holds Pt. 2	Steps	BMG	
1 October	Bright Magic	Public Service Broadcasting	Pias	
8 October	One Touch	Sugababes	London Music Stream	
15 October	Huffy	We Are Scientists	100%	
22 October	60	Daniel O'Donnell	DMG TV	
29 October	Future Past	Duran Duran	BMG	
5 November	Acoustic Hymns, Vol. 1	Richard Ashcroft	BMG	
12 November	Kid A Mnesia	Radiohead	XL	
19 November	The Nearer the Fountain, More Pure the Stream Flows	Damon Albarn	Transgressive	
26 November	Motorheart	The Darkness	Cooking Vinyl	
3 December	Turning to Crime	Deep Purple	Ear Music	
10 December	2.0	JLS	BMG	
17 December	2.0	JLS	BMG	
24 December	AM	Arctic Monkeys	Domino	
31 December	Disco	Kylie Minogue	BMG	

== See also ==
- List of UK Rock & Metal Albums Chart number ones of 2021
- List of UK Album Downloads Chart number ones of 2021
- List of UK Dance Albums Chart number ones of 2021
- List of UK R&B Albums Chart number ones of 2021
- List of UK Independent Singles Chart number ones of 2021
