= List of UK Dance Albums Chart number ones of 2021 =

These are the Official Charts Company's UK Dance Albums Chart number ones of 2021. The chart week runs from Friday to Thursday with the chart-date given as the following Thursday.

== Chart history ==
Issue date	Album	Artist(s)	Record label	Ref.
7 January	Throwback 90's Dance	Various Artists	Ministry of Sound	
14 January	Welcome to the Otherside	Jean-Michel Jarre	Sony	
21 January	Throwback 90's Dance	Various Artists	Ministry of Sound	
28 January	Throwback 90's Dance	Various Artists	Ministry of Sound	
4 February	Isles	Bicep	Ninja Tune	
11 February	Isles	Bicep	Ninja Tune	
18 February	Isles	Bicep	Ninja Tune	
25 February	Throwback 90's Dance	Various Artists	Ministry of Sound	
4 March	Times	SG Lewis	EMI	
11 March	In Ferneaux	Blanck Mass	Sacred Bones	
18 March	Organ	Dimension	Dimension	
25 March	Throwback 90's Dance	Various Artists	Ministry of Sound	
1 April	Horror Show	The Midnight	Counter	
8 April	Throwback 90's Dance	Various Artists	Ministry of Sound	
15 April	Throwback 90's Dance	Various Artists	Ministry of Sound	
22 April	Amazônia	Jean-Michel Jarre	RCA	
29 April	Dance Floor Anthems	Various Artists	Crimson	
6 May	Everything We Had to Leave Behind	Chicane	Modena	
13 May	Dance Floor Anthems	Various Artists	Crimson	
20 May	Dance Floor Anthems	Various Artists	Crimson	
27 May	Dance Floor Anthems	Various Artists	Crimson	
3 June	Throwback 90's Dance	Various Artists	Ministry of Sound	
10 June	Throwback 90's Dance	Various Artists	Ministry of Sound	
17 June	Throwback 90's Dance	Various Artists	Ministry of Sound	
24 June	Throwback 90's Dance	Various Artists	Ministry of Sound	
1 July	Together In Static	Daniel Avery	Phantasy Sound	
8 July	Olympia	Gorgon City	Positiva	
15 July	Throwback 90's Dance	Various Artists	Ministry of Sound	
22 July	Black Halo	Hybrid	Distinctive	
29 July	Now That's What I Call Ibiza	Various Artists	EMI/Sony	
5 August	Now That's What I Call Ibiza	Various Artists	EMI/Sony	
12 August	Now That's What I Call Ibiza	Various Artists	EMI/Sony	
19 August	Now That's What I Call Ibiza	Various Artists	EMI/Sony	
26 August	Still Slipping Vol.1	Joy Orbison	XL	
2 September	The Greatest Hits Pt1	Kurupt Fm	Polydor	
9 September	Fire	Bug	Ninja Tune	
16 September	Ground Control	Rudimental	Atlantic	
23 September	Throwback 90's Dance	Various Artists	Ministry of Sound	
30 September	Throwback 90's Dance	Various Artists	Ministry of Sound	
7 October	Throwback 90's Dance	Various Artists	Ministry of Sound	
14 October	30 Years - Three Decades of Dance	Various Artists	Ministry of Sound	
21 October	30 Years - Three Decades of Dance	Various Artists	Ministry of Sound	
28 October	Throwback 90's Dance	Various Artists	Ministry of Sound	
4 November	Throwback 90's Dance	Various Artists	Ministry of Sound	
11 November	Shout Out! To Freedom...	Nightmares on Wax	Warp	
18 November	Throwback 90's Dance	Various Artists	Ministry of Sound	
25 November	Throwback 90's Dance	Various Artists	Ministry of Sound	
2 December	Throwback 90's Dance	Various Artists	Ministry of Sound	
9 December	The Annual 2022	Various Artists	Ministry of Sound	
16 December	Pete Tong & Friends - Ibiza Classics	Pete Tong	Ministry of Sound	
23 December	The Annual 2022	Various Artists	Ministry of Sound	
30 December	The Annual 2022	Various Artists	Ministry of Sound	

== See also ==
- List of UK Albums Chart number ones of 2021
- List of UK Dance Singles Chart number ones of 2021
- List of UK Album Downloads Chart number ones of 2021
- List of UK Independent Albums Chart number ones of 2021
- List of UK R&B Albums Chart number ones of 2021
- List of UK Rock & Metal Albums Chart number ones of 2021
- List of UK Compilation Chart number ones of the 2020s
