= Black honey =

Black honey may refer to:

- Black Honey (band), an English indie rock band
  - Black Honey (album), 2018
- Kuromitsu, a Japanese sugar syrup that literally translates to "black honey"
- Black honey buzzard, a species of bird of prey native to Papua New Guinea
- "Black Honey", a song from Graham Parker's 1976 album Heat Treatment
- "Black Honey" (song), a 2016 song by American rock band Thrice
- Assal Eswed, a 2010 Egyptian comedy film that literally translates to Black Honey
- Salvia mellifera, a shrub that is used to make black sage honey
- Melianthus comosus, a flower that produces black nectar that is sometimes referred to as "black honey"
- Apis andreniformis, a species of bee that is also known as a "black dwarf honey bee" or "black honey bee"
