= List of UK Independent Singles Chart number ones of 2021 =

These are the Official Charts Company's UK Independent Singles Chart number-one singles of 2021.

== Chart history ==
Chart date (week ending)	Song	Artist(s)	Record label	References
7 January	"Merry Xmas Everybody"	Slade	BMG	
14 January	"Really Love"	KSI featuring Craig David and Digital Farm Animals	BMG	
21 January	"Really Love"	KSI featuring Craig David and Digital Farm Animals	BMG	
28 January	"Really Love"	KSI featuring Craig David and Digital Farm Animals	BMG	
4 February	"Really Love"	KSI featuring Craig David and Digital Farm Animals	BMG	
11 February	"Really Love"	KSI featuring Craig David and Digital Farm Animals	BMG	
18 February	"Really Love"	KSI featuring Craig David and Digital Farm Animals	BMG	
25 February	"Commitment Issues"	Central Cee	Central Cee	
4 March	"Commitment Issues"	Central Cee	Central Cee	
11 March	"Commitment Issues"	Central Cee	Central Cee	
18 March	"Commitment Issues"	Central Cee	Central Cee	
25 March	"Commitment Issues"	Central Cee	Central Cee	
1 April	"Commitment Issues"	Central Cee	Central Cee	
8 April	"Commitment Issues"	Central Cee	Central Cee	
15 April	"Commitment Issues"	Central Cee	Central Cee	
22 April	"Commitment Issues"	Central Cee	Central Cee	
29 April	"Commitment Issues"	Central Cee	Central Cee	
6 May	"Didn't Know"	Tom Zanetti	Sic	
13 May	"Didn't Know"	Tom Zanetti	Sic	
20 May	"Didn't Know"	Tom Zanetti	Sic	
27 May	"Didn't Know"	Tom Zanetti	Sic	
3 June	"Butter"	BTS	Big Hit Entertainment	
10 June	"Butter"	BTS	Big Hit Entertainment	
17 June	"Butter"	BTS	Big Hit Entertainment	
24 June	"Didn't Know"	Tom Zanetti	Sic	
1 July	"Holiday"	KSI	BMG	
8 July	"Holiday"	KSI	BMG	
15 July	"Holiday"	KSI	BMG	
22 July	"Holiday"	KSI	BMG	
29 July ^{[b]}	"Holiday"	KSI	BMG	
5 August	"Holiday"	KSI	BMG	
12 August	"Holiday"	KSI	BMG	
19 August	"Holiday"	KSI	BMG	
26 August	"Holiday"	KSI	BMG	
2 September	"Holiday"	KSI	BMG	
9 September	"Holiday"	KSI	BMG	
16 September	"Holiday"	KSI	BMG	
23 September	"Obsessed with You"	Central Cee	Central Cee	
30 September	"Love Nwantiti (Ah Ah Ah)"	CKay	WM South Africa	
7 October	"Love Nwantiti (Ah Ah Ah)"	CKay	WM South Africa	
14 October	"Love Nwantiti (Ah Ah Ah)"	CKay	WM South Africa	
21 October	"Love Nwantiti (Ah Ah Ah)"	CKay	WM South Africa	
28 October	"Love Nwantiti (Ah Ah Ah)"	CKay	WM South Africa	
4 November	"Love Nwantiti (Ah Ah Ah)"	CKay	WM South Africa	
11 November	"Monster Mash"	Bobby Boris Pickett	The Monster Mash.Com	
18 November	"Love Tonight"	Shouse	Hell Beach	
25 November	"Someone like You"	Adele	XL	
2 December	"Someone like You"	Adele	XL	
9 December	"Merry Xmas Everybody"	Slade	BMG	
16 December	"Merry Xmas Everybody"	Slade	BMG	
23 December	"Merry Xmas Everybody"	Slade	BMG	
30 December ^{[a]}	"Sausage Rolls for Everyone"	LadBaby featuring Ed Sheeran and Elton John	FrtyFve	

== Notes ==
- ^{a} – The single was simultaneously number-one on the singles chart.
- ^{b} - The artist was simultaneously number one on the Independent Albums Chart.

== Number-one Indie artists ==
Position	Artist	Weeks at number one
1	KSI	18
2	Central Cee	11
3	CKay	6
4	Slade	4
5	Tom Zanetti	5
6	BTS	3
7	Adele	2
8	Bobby Boris Pickett	1
8	Shouse	1
8	LadBaby	1

== See also ==
- List of UK Dance Singles Chart number ones of 2021
- List of UK R&B Singles Chart number ones of 2021
- List of UK Rock & Metal Singles Chart number ones of 2021
- List of UK Independent Albums Chart number ones of 2021
