= List of UK Dance Singles Chart number ones of 2021 =

The UK Dance Singles Chart is a weekly music chart compiled in the United Kingdom by the Official Charts Company (OCC) from sales of songs in the dance music genre (house, drum and bass, dubstep, etc.) in record stores and digital downloads. The chart week runs from Friday to Thursday with the chart-date given as the following Thursday.

This is a list of the songs which were number one on the UK Dance Singles Chart during 2021.

== Chart history ==
Chart date (week ending)	Song	Artist(s)	References
7 January	"Head & Heart"	Joel Corry featuring MNEK	
14 January	"Head & Heart"	Joel Corry featuring MNEK	
21 January	"Head & Heart"	Joel Corry featuring MNEK	
28 January	"Head & Heart"	Joel Corry featuring MNEK	
4 February	"Wellerman"	Nathan Evans, 220 Kid and Billen Ted	
11 February	"Wellerman"	Nathan Evans, 220 Kid and Billen Ted	
18 February	"Wellerman"	Nathan Evans, 220 Kid and Billen Ted	
25 February	"Wellerman"	Nathan Evans, 220 Kid and Billen Ted	
4 March	"Wellerman"	Nathan Evans, 220 Kid and Billen Ted	
11 March	"Wellerman"	Nathan Evans, 220 Kid and Billen Ted	
18 March	"Wellerman"	Nathan Evans, 220 Kid and Billen Ted	
25 March ^{[a]}	"Wellerman"	Nathan Evans, 220 Kid and Billen Ted	
1 April ^{[a]}	"Wellerman"	Nathan Evans, 220 Kid and Billen Ted	
8 April	"Wellerman"	Nathan Evans, 220 Kid and Billen Ted	
15 April	"Wellerman"	Nathan Evans, 220 Kid and Billen Ted	
22 April	"Bed"	Joel Corry, Raye and David Guetta	
29 April	"Bed"	Joel Corry, Raye and David Guetta	
6 May	"Bed"	Joel Corry, Raye and David Guetta	
13 May	"Bed"	Joel Corry, Raye and David Guetta	
20 May	"Bed"	Joel Corry, Raye and David Guetta	
27 May	"Bed"	Joel Corry, Raye and David Guetta	
3 June	"Bed"	Joel Corry, Raye and David Guetta	
10 June	"Bed"	Joel Corry, Raye and David Guetta	
17 June	"Bed"	Joel Corry, Raye and David Guetta	
24 June	"Heartbreak Anthem"	Galantis, David Guetta and Little Mix	
1 July	"Heartbreak Anthem"	Galantis, David Guetta and Little Mix	
8 July	"Heartbreak Anthem"	Galantis, David Guetta and Little Mix	
15 July	"Heartbreak Anthem"	Galantis, David Guetta and Little Mix	
22 July	"Heartbreak Anthem"	Galantis, David Guetta and Little Mix	
29 July	"Heartbreak Anthem"	Galantis, David Guetta and Little Mix	
5 August	"Black Magic"	Jonasu	
12 August	"Black Magic"	Jonasu	
19 August	"Black Magic"	Jonasu	
26 August	"Remember"	Becky Hill and David Guetta	
2 September	"Remember"	Becky Hill and David Guetta	
9 September	"Remember"	Becky Hill and David Guetta	
16 September	"Remember"	Becky Hill and David Guetta	
23 September	"Remember"	Becky Hill and David Guetta	
30 September	"Remember"	Becky Hill and David Guetta	
7 October	"Out Out"	Joel Corry, Jax Jones and Charli XCX	
14 October	"Out Out"	Joel Corry, Jax Jones and Charli XCX	
21 October	"Out Out"	Joel Corry, Jax Jones and Charli XCX	
28 October	"Out Out"	Joel Corry, Jax Jones and Charli XCX	
4 November	"Out Out"	Joel Corry, Jax Jones and Charli XCX	
11 November	"Out Out"	Joel Corry, Jax Jones and Charli XCX	
18 November	"My Heart Goes (La Di Da)"	Becky Hill and Topic	
25 November	"My Heart Goes (La Di Da)"	Becky Hill and Topic	
2 December	"Do It to It"	Acraze featuring Cherish	
9 December	"Do It to It"	Acraze featuring Cherish	
16 December	"Do It to It"	Acraze featuring Cherish	
23 December	"Do It to It"	Acraze featuring Cherish	
30 December	"Do It to It"	Acraze featuring Cherish	

- ^{a} – the single was simultaneously number-one on the singles chart.

== Number-one artists ==
Position	Artist	Weeks at number one
1	David Guetta	21
2	Joel Corry	19
3	220 Kid	11
3	Billen Ted	11
3	Nathan Evans	11
4	Raye	9
5	Becky Hill	8
6	Galantis	6
6	Little Mix	6
6	Jax Jones	6
6	Charli XCX	6
7	Acraze	5
8	Jonasu	3
9	Topic	2

== See also ==
- List of number-one singles of 2021 (UK)
- List of UK Dance Albums Chart number ones of 2021
- List of UK R&B Singles Chart number ones of 2021
- List of UK Rock & Metal Singles Chart number ones of 2021
- List of UK Independent Singles Chart number ones of 2021
