= Stereo Mind Game =

Album by English indie folk band Daughter

Studio album by Daughter
- Released: 7 April 2023
- Genre: Indie folk
- Length: 44:24
- Label: 4AD; Glassnote

Daughter chronology
Not to Disappear (2016)	Stereo Mind Game (2023)

Singles from Stereo Mind Game
- 1. "Be On Your Way"; 2. "Party"; 3. "Swim Back"

Stereo Mind Game is the third studio album by English indie folk band Daughter. It was released on 7 April 2023 through 4AD and Glassnote Records, following a seven-year gap since their previous studio album Not to Disappear.

Despite the band members relocating to different cities and the impact of the COVID 19 pandemic, they continued to write together, with the eventual album being recorded in various locations including Devon, Bristol, London, San Diego and Vancouver.

It is the first album by Daughter to feature vocals other than by lead singer Elena Tonra, with fellow band member Igor Haefeli singing on “Future Lover”, “Swim Back.” and "Neptune"

== Reception ==
Professional ratings
Aggregate scores
Source	Rating
Metacritic	76/100
Review scores
Source	Rating
NME	4/5 stars
The Observer	4/5 stars
DIY	4/5 stars
Mojo	3/5 stars
Pitchfork	6.7/10 stars

According to the review aggregator Metacritic, Stereo Mind Game received "generally favorable reviews" based on a weighted average score of 76 out of 100 from 12 critic scores.

Much of the reception focused positively on the album's continuity to previous efforts, with NME stating it is exemplary of the "rich orchestration and poetic lyricism they’re known for", while AllMusic described how "Daughter change things up while remaining instantly familiar".

Mojo, however, took issue with the tone of the album, describing how "the darkness of Daughter's dream-pop can feel a bit suffocating".

== Track listing ==
Stereo Mind Game track listing
No.	Title	Length
1.	"Intro"	0:55
2.	"Be On Your Way"	4:04
3.	"Party"	4:27
4.	"Dandelion"	3:51
5.	"Neptune"	5:25
6.	"Swim Back"	4:34
7.	"Junkmail"	4:05
8.	"Future Lover"	4:13
9.	"(Missed Calls)"	1:43
10.	"Isolation"	2:37
11.	"To Rage"	4:45
12.	"Wish I Could Cross the Sea"	3:38
Total length:		44:17

== Charts ==
Chart performance for Stereo Mind Game
Chart (2023)	Peak position
Belgian Albums (Ultratop Flanders)	32
Belgian Albums (Ultratop Wallonia)	161
French Albums (SNEP)	169
German Albums (Offizielle Top 100)	59
Portuguese Albums (AFP)	36
Scottish Albums (OCC)	2
Swiss Albums (Schweizer Hitparade)	31
UK Albums (OCC)	12
UK Album Downloads (OCC)	5
UK Independent Albums (OCC)	1
