= His Young Heart =

EP by Daughter
- Released: 20 April 2011
- Genre: Indie rock; acoustic rock; alternative rock; lo-fi
- Label: Self-released/Glassnote
- Producer: Elena Tonra; Igor Haefeli

Daughter chronology
His Young Heart (2011)	The Wild Youth (2011)

His Young Heart is a four track EP by Daughter which was self-released by the band on 20 April 2011. It was re-released on July 3, 2012, on Glassnote Records who pressed it on 10" vinyl and made it available as a download. The cover image is an old family photograph of singer Elena Tonra. Tonra and Haefeli recorded this together as drummer Remi would join them later in the year.

== Track listing ==
All tracks are written by Elena Tonra

No.	Title	Length
1.	"Landfill"	4:23
2.	"The Woods"	3:50
3.	"Candles"	4:53
4.	"Switzerland"	3:48

== Personnel ==
- Elena Tonra - Vocals, Guitar, Accordion, Producer
- Igor Haefeli - Electric Guitar, Vocals, Drums, Bass, Glockenspiel, Producer
