= Daughter (band) =

English indie folk band

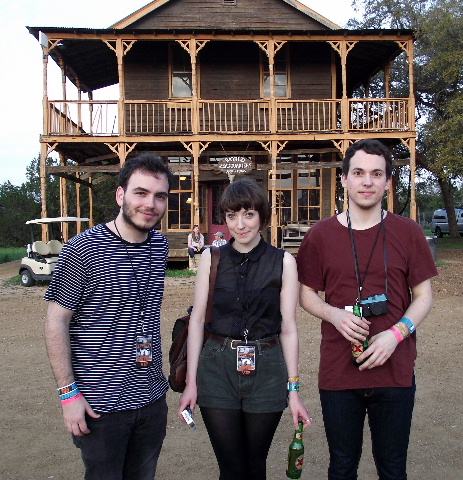
- Daughter at SXSW in 2012

Background information
- Origin: London, England
- Genres: Indie folk; shoegaze
- Years active: 2010–2018, 2023 (on hiatus)
- Labels: 4AD; Glassnote
- Spinoffs: Ex:Re
- Members: Elena Tonra; Igor Haefeli; Remi Aguilella
- Website: www.ohdaughter.com

Daughter is a European indie folk trio. Fronted by North London native Elena Tonra, the band was formed in 2010 after the addition of American-born Swiss guitarist Igor Haefeli and French drummer Remi Aguilella. They have released four EPs and three albums, and are currently signed to Glassnote (North America) and 4AD (Europe). After playing the local London circuit, they toured supporting Ben Howard around Europe and have since played headlining tours around North America, Europe and Australia.

== Biography ==
Of Irish–Italian parentage, Elena Tonra was raised in Northwood, London. Through her Dublin-born grandfather she experienced traditional Irish music from an early age. Her interest in music began when she received a copy of the album Grace by Jeff Buckley. After being bullied at school she used writing to "deal emotionally with life". Changing schools at the age of 12 had a great impact and since then Tonra writes "about things I feel difficult talking about in adulthood".

Tonra began her career in music by performing acoustic shows under her own name around London. She found that this "didn't suit me at all. As a musician, I'm self-taught and felt I was restricted by my abilities". Haefeli attended one of the acoustic shows that Tonra was performing and found that "she had this power which drew everyone in". Originally from Neuchatel, Haefeli also attended London's Institute of Contemporary Music Performance where he met Tonra during a songwriting course. They began performing together with Haefeli adding electric guitars. After their first demo started word of mouth on the band, Daughter self-released their debut EP, His Young Heart, on 20 April 2011, recorded in Haefeli's bedsit. Later that same year, they released another EP, The Wild Youth, on 2 October through artist-led Communion Records. The latter EP earned praise from British website For Folk's Sake who described Daughter as "one of the unique sounds in the pop landscape today." BBC Radio 1 DJ Huw Stephens also invited them to perform a Maida Vale Session for his show.

Tonra and Haefeli became romantically involved and the guitarist insisted that they "keep our couple life and our band life separate, [because] I don't want Elena to stop saying things in her songs that are personal [as] songwriters need to be expansive and they need to be unafraid". While Tonra concurred with "Igor doesn't question my lyrics. He regards what we do as an art form. He certainly doesn't try to rewrite my words. I never tell anyone what my songs are about, not even him. I feel they are direct enough, anyway. They aren't especially obscure". Tonra and Haefeli ended their relationship before the release of their album If You Leave in 2013.

In 2012, shortly after headlining a 700-capacity show in London, Daughter announced their signing to UK label 4AD. Speaking of this, Elena commented "we couldn't be happier to be working with 4AD, a label that has released so many inspirational records and whose ethos we hold in very high regard. It really is a privilege." Their first single proper, "Smother", was released in October of that year. It was playlisted by both BBC Radio 1 and 6Music, while being awarded Single of the Week by long-time supporter Huw Stephens. In December 2012 the band appeared on the David Letterman Show prior to the release of the record, which Tonra described as "perhaps (...) a cart-before-the-horse situation".

=== If You Leave ===
The band released their debut album, If You Leave, in March 2013 (May in Norway). Charting at Number 16 in the UK, it was also received favourably in the press; "An album as beautifully conceived as If You Leave is one you follow from start to finish, riveted by the story it weaves and the emotion it bleeds. And in these digital days that feels like a remarkable achievement" Drowned in Sound said in their 9/10 review, while The Fly in a 4/5 album review said that it's "word-in-the-ear intimate and mountain-range massive". Daughter also won Independent Album of the Year for If You Leave at the 2013 AIM Independent Music Awards in London. The band began a lengthy tour in support of the album and recruited Luke Saunders as an additional live-member to ensure the material could be reproduced. As Haefeli explained: "He plays everything we can't play, which is keyboards, bass and some more guitar. We were really happy with the result. It took quite a while and a lot of rehearsing, but we are really happy with how the songs sound live". The band also use a number of vocal and guitar effects to achieve this sound live.

During the first two months of 2014, the band travelled to the Far East and Australasia for a number of headlining shows and as part of the St Jerome's Laneway Festival. In April, Daughter supported The National on six North American tour dates, while they also announced the release of a 4AD Sessions EP, a collaboration with composer Joe Duddell. It consists of five tracks performed live at Portmeirion with an eight-piece ensemble that was also filmed.

=== Not to Disappear ===
In September 2014 the band indicated that they had started working on a follow-up at their own studio in London. Haefeli explained: "We've played so many shows that the first album became rockier on stage and we're playing with that dynamic". On 6 April 2015 Daughter announced they would be supporting Ben Howard on a short string of tour dates in the United States.

On 30 September 2015 the band announced that they would release the 10-track album Not to Disappear in 2016, while the first single "Doing the Right Thing" was made available as a music video. Not to Disappear was released by 4AD on 15 January 2016, preceded by the music video for second single "Numbers" in November 2015. On 28 July 2016 a music video for "No Care" was released.

=== Music from Before the Storm and Ex:Re ===
On 1 September 2017, Daughter released their third album, titled Music From Before the Storm. The 13-track LP, mostly instrumental, was written as the soundtrack for the 2017 video game Life Is Strange: Before the Storm.

In November 2018, Elena Tonra announced Ex:Re, her upcoming solo debut album. It was released on 30 November 2018 under the artist name Ex:Re via 4AD, with its first single "Romance" released on 26 November 2018. With the release of Ex:Re, Daughter went on hiatus. In a Guitar Magazine interview, Elena said: "We decided to have a little break, because we realised that we'd been together and working together for about eight years, so we decided it would be nice – in a friendly way! – to spend some time apart." In 2021, Ex:Re released Ex:Re with 12 Ensemble, a collaboration with composer Josephine Stephenson and the string orchestra 12 Ensemble.

=== Stereo Mind Game ===
On 9 January 2023, Daughter released "Be On Your Way", the first single from their first studio album in seven years, along with an announcement of the album's release date. This was followed by the second single, "Party", on 8 February, and third single "Swim Back" on 28 February. Stereo Mind Game was released on 7 April 2023, via Glassnote.

The album was received favorably by critics. NME noted in their four-star review that the band "wad[ed] into new wider ranges of emotion without leaving behind the rich orchestration and poetic lyricism they’re known for", whilst DIY Magazine praised "the trio as a whole painting in sonic watercolour" in their 4/5 review.

== Members ==
- Elena Tonra – vocals, guitar, bass, piano
- Igor Haefeli – guitar, bass, keyboards, programming
- Remi Aguilella – drums, percussion, sampler

== Discography ==
=== Studio albums ===
List of studio albums, with selected details and chart positions
| Title | Details | Peak chart positions | | | | | | | | | | Certifications |
| Title | Details | UK | AUS | BEL (FL) | CAN | FRA | GER | NL | NZ | SWI | US | Certifications |
|---|---|---|---|---|---|---|---|---|---|---|---|---|
| If You Leave | Released: 18 March 2013; Label: 4AD; Formats: CD, digital download, LP, streaming | 16 | 50 | 56 | 21 | 109 | 88 | 44 | — | 65 | 97 | BPI: Gold |
| Not to Disappear | Released: 15 January 2016; Label: 4AD; Formats: CD, digital download, LP, streaming | 17 | 26 | 11 | 20 | 107 | 26 | 32 | 40 | 12 | 80 | |
| Stereo Mind Game | Released: 7 April 2023; Label: 4AD, Glassnote; Formats: CD, digital download, LP, streaming | 12 | — | 32 | — | 169 | 59 | — | — | 31 | — | |

=== Soundtrack albums ===
List of soundtrack albums, with selected details and chart positions
| Title | Album details | Peak chart positions | |
| Title | Album details | BEL (FL) | SWI |
|---|---|---|---|
| Music from Before the Storm | Released: 1 September 2017; Label: Glassnote; Formats: Digital download, vinyl (limited press) | 93 | 86 |

=== Extended plays ===
List of extended plays, with selected details
| Title | EP details |
|---|---|
| Demos | Released: 2010; Label: Self-released; Format: Digital download |
| His Young Heart | Released: 20 April 2011; Label: Self-released; Format: Digital download |
| The Wild Youth | Released: 2 October 2011; Label: Communion; Format: Digital download |
| 4AD Sessions | Released: 1 January 2014; Label: 4AD; Format: Digital download |
| Middle Farm Session | Released: 20 January 2025; Label: 4AD; Format: Digital download |

=== Singles ===
List of singles, showing year released and album name
| Title | Year | Certifications | Album |
|---|---|---|---|
| "Smother" | 2012 | | If You Leave |
| "Human" | 2013 | | If You Leave |
| "Youth" | 2013 | BPI: Platinum | If You Leave and The Wild Youth |
| "Doing the Right Thing" | 2015 | | Not to Disappear |
| "Numbers" | 2015 | | Not to Disappear |
| "How" | 2016 | | Not to Disappear |
| "No Care" | 2016 | | Not to Disappear |
| "The End" | 2016 | | Not to Disappear |
| "Be On Your Way" | 2023 | | Stereo Mind Game |
| "Party" | 2023 | | Stereo Mind Game |
| "Swim Back" | 2023 | | Stereo Mind Game |
| "Not Enough" | 2026 | | Non-album single |

=== Other certified songs ===
List of other certified songs, showing year released and album name
| Title | Year | Certifications | Album |
|---|---|---|---|
| "Medicine" | 2011 | BPI: Silver | The Wild Youth |
