= List of UK R&B Singles Chart number ones of 2021 =

The logo of the Official Charts Company, responsible for compiling all of the official music charts in the United Kingdom, including the R&B singles chart.

The UK R&B Singles Chart is a weekly chart that ranks the 40 biggest-selling singles and albums that are classified in the R&B genre in the United Kingdom. The chart is compiled by the Official Charts Company, and is based on both physical, and digital sales.

The following are the songs which have topped the UK R&B Singles Chart in 2021.

== Number-one singles ==
| Chart date (week ending) | Song | Artist(s) | Record label | References |
|---|---|---|---|---|
| 7 January | "Mood" | 24kGoldn featuring Iann Dior | Black Butter | |
| 14 January ^{[b]} | "Blinding Lights" | The Weeknd | Republic | |
| 21 January ^{[b]} | "Blinding Lights" | The Weeknd | Republic | |
| 28 January | "Without You" | The Kid Laroi | RCA | |
| 4 February | "Without You" | The Kid Laroi | RCA | |
| 11 February | "Money Talks" | Fredo featuring Dave | Dave Neighbourhood/Since 93 | |
| 18 February | "Without You" | The Kid Laroi | RCA | |
| 25 February | "Calling My Phone" | Lil Tjay & 6lack | Columbia | |
| 4 March | "Calling My Phone" | Lil Tjay & 6lack | Columbia | |
| 11 March | "Calling My Phone" | Lil Tjay & 6lack | Columbia | |
| 18 March | "What's Next" | Drake | OVO/Republic | |
| 25 March | "Latest Trends" | A1 x J1 | EMI | |
| 1 April | "Latest Trends" | A1 x J1 | EMI | |
| 8 April | "Latest Trends" | A1 x J1 | EMI | |
| 15 April | "Latest Trends" | A1 x J1 | EMI | |
| 22 April | "Rapstar" | Polo G | Columbia | |
| 29 April | "Rapstar" | Polo G | Columbia | |
| 6 May | "Body" | Tion Wayne and Russ Millions | Atlantic | |
| 13 May ^{[a]} | "Body" | Tion Wayne and Russ Millions | Atlantic | |
| 20 May ^{[a]} | "Body" | Tion Wayne and Russ Millions | Atlantic | |
| 27 May ^{[a]} | "Body" | Tion Wayne and Russ Millions | Atlantic | |
| 3 June | "Body" | Tion Wayne and Russ Millions | Atlantic | |
| 10 June | "Body" | Tion Wayne and Russ Millions | Atlantic | |
| 17 June | "Body" | Tion Wayne and Russ Millions | Atlantic | |
| 24 June | "Body" | Tion Wayne and Russ Millions | Atlantic | |
| 1 July | "Save Your Tears" | The Weeknd | Republic | |
| 8 July | "Save Your Tears" | The Weeknd | Republic | |
| 15 July | "Save Your Tears" | The Weeknd | Republic | |
| 22 July | "Clash" | Dave and Stormzy | Dave Neighbourhood | |
| 29 July | "Clash" | Dave and Stormzy | Dave Neighbourhood | |
| 5 August ^{[b]} | "Clash" | Dave and Stormzy | Dave Neighbourhood | |
| 12 August ^{[b]} | "Clash" | Dave and Stormzy | Dave Neighbourhood | |
| 19 August ^{[b]} | "Clash" | Dave and Stormzy | Dave Neighbourhood | |
| 26 August | "Wasted" | Digga D featuring ArrDee | EGA Music | |
| 2 September | "Industry Baby" | Lil Nas X and Jack Harlow | Lil Nas X | |
| 9 September | "Industry Baby" | Lil Nas X and Jack Harlow | Lil Nas X | |
| 16 September | "Girls Want Girls" | Drake featuring Lil Baby | OVO/Republic | |
| 23 September | "Girls Want Girls" | Drake featuring Lil Baby | OVO/Republic | |
| 30 September | "Industry Baby" | Lil Nas X and Jack Harlow | Lil Nas X | |
| 7 October | "Obsessed With You" | Central Cee | Central Cee | |
| 14 October | "Obsessed With You" | Central Cee | Central Cee | |
| 21 October | "Obsessed With You" | Central Cee | Central Cee | |
| 28 October | "Obsessed With You" | Central Cee | Central Cee | |
| 4 November | "Obsessed With You" | Central Cee | Central Cee | |
| 11 November | "Obsessed With You" | Central Cee | Central Cee | |
| 18 November | "Flowers (Say My Name)" | ArrDee | Island | |
| 25 November | "Flowers (Say My Name)" | ArrDee | Island | |
| 2 December | "Flowers (Say My Name)" | ArrDee | Island | |
| 9 December | "Flowers (Say My Name)" | ArrDee | Island | |
| 16 December | "Flowers (Say My Name)" | ArrDee | Island | |
| 23 December | "Flowers (Say My Name)" | ArrDee | Island | |
| 30 December | "Flowers (Say My Name)" | ArrDee | Island | |

== Notes ==
- ^{a} - The single was simultaneously number one on the UK Singles Chart.
- ^{b} - The artist was simultaneously number one on the R&B Albums Chart.

== See also ==
- List of UK Singles Chart number ones of 2021
- List of UK R&B Albums Chart number ones of 2021
- List of UK Dance Singles Chart number ones of 2021
