= Ex:Re =

English one-piece band

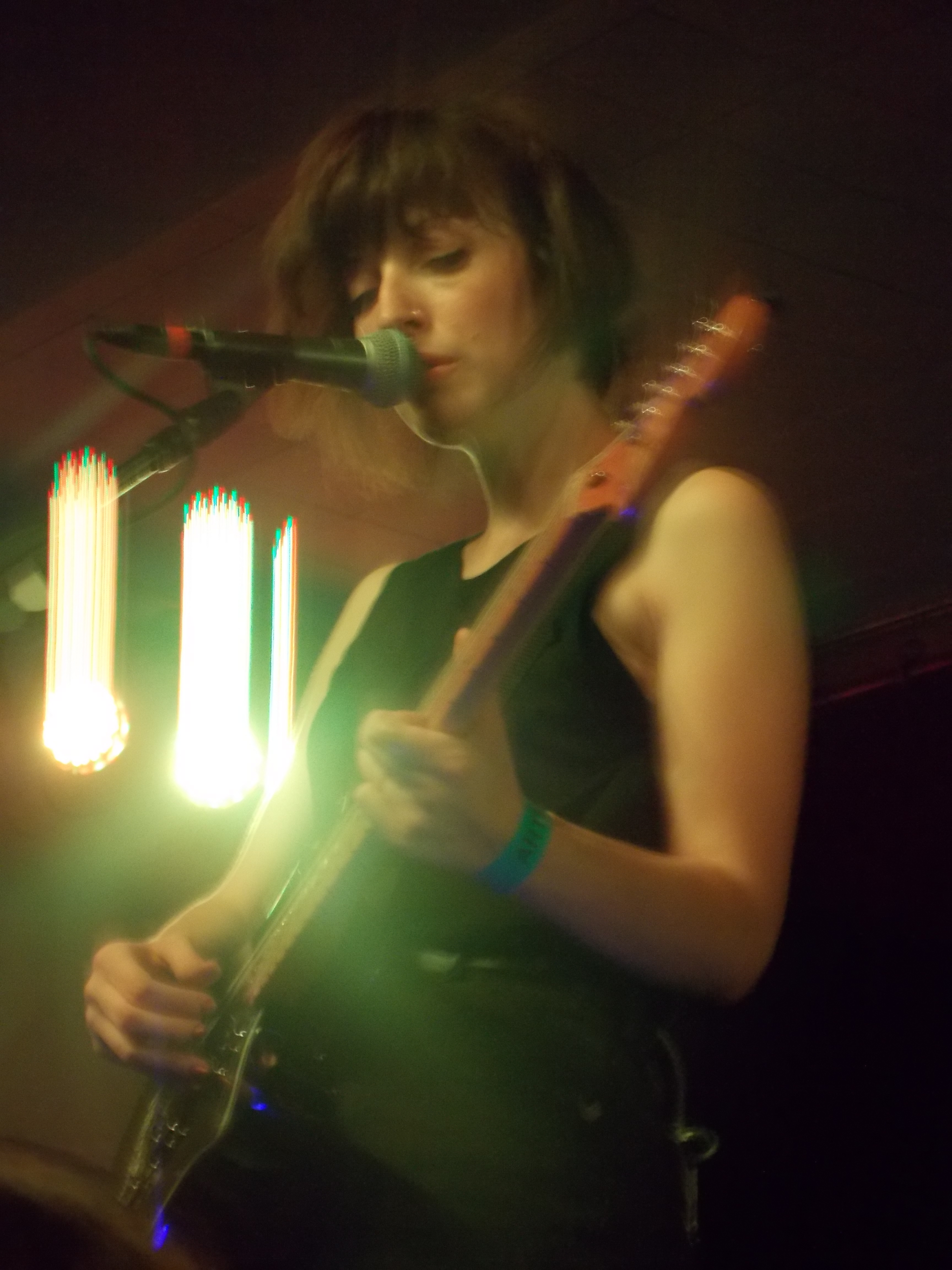
- Tonra at the Taft Theatre Ballroom in 2013

Background information
- Origin: England
- Genre: Indie rock
- Years active: 2016–present
- Labels: 4AD, Glassnote Records
- Spinoff of: Daughter
- Members: Elena Tonra; Touring musicians: Fabian Prynn; Josephine Stephenson; Jethro Fox
- Website: elenatonra.com

Ex:Re (/ˈɛksˌreɪ/ EX-ray) is the solo project of Elena Tonra, singer, songwriter and guitarist of the band Daughter. She released her debut solo album titled Ex:Re in 2018.

== History ==
=== Ex:Re (2018) ===
On 26 November 2018, Tonra revealed the new project, with the release of a first single and video titled "Romance". It came with the announcement that a full-length album would follow a few days later, after a debut show at London's Hoxton Hall on 28 November. Ex:Re came out digitally on 30 November 2018 via the labels 4AD and Glassnote. It was later released physically on CD and vinyl on 1 February 2019, with a limited blue pressing of the vinyl, including a live EP captured at the initial Hoxton Hall performance, to celebrate being Rough Trade's Album of the Month.

Centred around a breakup, Tonra said of the album: "Although the record is written for someone, a lot of the time it's about the space without that person in it. In every scenario, there's either the person in memory or the noticeable absence of that person in the present moment. I suppose it is a break-up record, however I do not talk about the relationship at all, and he hardly features in the scenes. He is only felt as a ghostly presence."

The album was produced and mixed by 4AD in-house engineer Fabian Prynn, with composer Josephine Stephenson on cello.

=== Ex:Re with 12 Ensemble (2021) ===
On 16 February 2021, Tonra announced the imminent release of a collaboration album titled Ex:Re with 12 Ensemble, a reimagination of the original songs for strings by the composer and Ex:Re cellist Josephine Stephenson, captured live at London's Kings Place in November 2019. The first single to come out was Where The Time Went, accompanied by a video of empty London streets directed by Tonra herself. The full album came out on digital platforms on 19 February.

=== Live appearances ===
Ex:Re's live appearances have been scarce. After the initial release show at Hoxton Hall, the band played a handful of support slots for Ben Howard at London's Brixton Academy in January 2019. A small tour in Japan (with Deerhunter and Gang Gang Dance, also of the label 4AD) ensued, followed by a short European headline tour in the Spring. The band played their last shows during festivals in Europe in the summer of 2019.

== Discography ==
=== Albums ===
Title	Details	Peak chart positions
Title	Details	UK
Ex:Re	Released: 30 November 2018; Labels: 4AD, Glassnote; Format: Digital download, CD, vinyl	88
Ex:Re with 12 Ensemble	Released: 19 February 2021; Labels: 4AD, Glassnote; Format: Digital download	—
Save As	Released: 30 October 2026; Labels: 4AD, Glassnote; Format: Digital download, CD, vinyl	—

=== Extended plays ===
Title	EP details
Live at Hoxton Hall	Released: 1 February 2019; Label: 4AD; Format: CD

== Live band members ==
- Elena Tonra – vocals, guitar, bass
- Fabian Prynn – drums
- Josephine Stephenson – cello, backing vocals, keyboards, bass
- Jethro Fox – guitar, bass, piano, percussion
