= Josephine Stephenson =

French-British composer

- Born: 1990 (age 35–36); Les Lilas, France
- Occupations: Composer, arranger, singer, instrumentalist
- Website: josephinestephenson.com

Josephine Stephenson (born 1990) is a French-British composer, arranger, singer and instrumentalist who works across a variety of musical genres.

== Early life and education ==
Stephenson learned cello and piano as a child, and as a teenager attended the Maîtrise de Radio France (the choir school of Radio France). After briefly studying philosophy at the Sorbonne University in Paris, she moved to the UK where she attended Clare College, University of Cambridge as a choral scholar and received a Bachelor of Music degree. She later obtained a master's degree in composition from the Royal College of Music, having studied under Kenneth Hesketh. In 2017-2019 she was a 'Writing The Future' composer with the London Sinfonietta.

== Career ==
During her master's studies, Stephenson's orchestration was likened to Claude Vivier, and her first short opera On False Perspective was staged in the Britten Theatre, co-produced by Tête à Tête and the Royal College of Music.

In 2015 she collaborated with FellSwoop Theatre on a devised piece of musical theatre, Ghost Opera, first performed at the Aix-en-Provence Festival and developed with The Lowry. In the same year she won ‘Best Composer’ at Underwire Film Festival for her work on the short film Emma, Change The Locks.

In 2016 Stephenson was commissioned by Radio France to write a piece for the Maîtrise, Ce n'était pas nous, premiered at the Maison de la Radio.

She contributed to the world’s first concerto for drum machine and orchestra in 2018, in a night curated by Nonclassical at Village Underground. The same year, after working with the band Daughter, Stephenson joined singer Elena Tonra's solo project, Ex:Re, playing cello, providing backing vocals, and arranging songs. In February 2021, an arrangement by Stephenson of Tonra's album with the 12 Ensemble string orchestra, was released.

Stephenson's song cycle Une Saison en Enfer, on text by Arthur Rimbaud, was written for and premiered by Allan Clayton, Aurora Orchestra, and conductor Brett Dean at the Wigmore Hall in London, December 2019. It was nominated for the Ivor Novello Awards in 2020.

A singer and multi-instrumentalist, she has appeared on albums by the Arctic Monkeys and Jon Hopkins, among others.

She is one of the three artistic directors of the London-based concert series and record label Listenpony, alongside Freya Waley-Cohen and William Marsey.

Stephenson won an Ivor Novello Award at The Ivors Classical Awards 2023. Comme l'espoir / You Might All Disappear, composed for soprano and guitar, won the award for Best Small Chamber Composition.

== Notable works ==
=== Vocal ===
- Une saison en enfer (2019) for tenor and string orchestra (Wigmore Hall commission)
- Between the war and you (2017) for soprano, clarinet, harp and double bass (Spitalfields Music commission)

=== Choral ===
- Into the Wreck (2021) for mixed chorus and narrator
- Now that heaven and earth and the wind are silent (2017) for SATB choir (Spitalfields Music commission)
- Ce n'était pas nous (2016) for children's voices (Radio France commission)
- if only (2015) for 40 voices (Bristol Old Vic commission)

=== Ensemble ===
- Shuffle (2019) for nine instruments (London Sinfonietta commission)

=== Chamber ===
- Lignéchos (2017) for violin, clarinet and piano (Miroirs Étendus commission)
- All casual bits and scraps, assembled (2015) for percussion quartet

=== Solo ===
- Cut Hold (2018) for solo cello (London Sinfonietta commission)
- Enero (2018) for solo guitar
- Sestina (2015) for solo piano
- Anamnesis (2013) for solo cello

=== Orchestra ===
- Writhen (2019), for chamber orchestra (Britten Sinfonia commission)
- Concerto for Drum Machine & Orchestra:V (2018) (Nonclassical commission)
- Abend (2013), for small orchestra

=== Opera ===
- Three Lunar Seas (2023)
- NARCISSE (2019) (ARCAL Lyrique commission)
- Les Constellations - Une Théorie (2016) (Miroirs Étendus commission, Opéra de Lille co-production)
- Ghost Opera (2015)
- On False Perspective (2014)

== Album contributions ==
Year	Artist	Album	Role	Label
2016	Radiohead	A Moon Shaped Pool	soprano (with London Contemporary Orchestra)	XL recordings
2018	Jon Hopkins	Singularity	solo vocal on “Feel First Life”	Domino
2018	Arctic Monkeys	Tranquility Base Hotel & Casino	piano	Domino
2018	We Were Evergreen	Overseas	string arrangements	Because Music
2018	Ana Silvera	Oracles	singer, choir leader, arrangements	Gearbox Records
2018	James	Living in Extraordinary Times	choir	Infectious Music
2018	Thom Yorke	Suspiria	soprano (with London Contemporary orchestra)	XL Recordings
2018	Ex:Re	Ex:Re	cello, backing vocals	4AD, Glassnote Records
2019	Hayden Thorpe	Diviner	backing vocals	Domino
2019	Thom Yorke	Anima	soprano (with London Contemporary orchestra)	XL Recordings
2019	Lisa Hannigan and stargaze	Live in Dublin	arrangements on “Nowhere to Go” and “Little Bird”	PIAS Recordings
2019	Shards	Find Sound	soprano	Erased Tapes Records
2020	James Righton	The Performer	piano, farfisa, additional string arrangements	DeeWee Records
2020	NZCA Lines	Pure Luxury	string arrangements	Memphis Industries
2021	Ex:Re, Josephine Stephenson	Ex:Re with 12 Ensemble	arrangements, piano, backing vocals	4AD, Glassnote Records
2021	Damon Albarn	The Nearer the Fountain, More Pure the Stream Flows	cello, vocals	Transgressive
