= Verdansk =

Single by Dave

from the album We're All Alone in This Together
- Released: 23 July 2021
- Genre: British hip hop; UK drill
- Length: 4:26
- Label: Dave; Neighbourhood
- Songwriters: David Omoregie; Kyle Evans
- Producer: Kyle Evans

Dave singles chronology
"Clash" (2021)	"Verdansk" (2021)	"Starlight" (2022)

Music video
- "Verdansk" on YouTube

"Verdansk" is a song by British rapper Dave, released on 23 July 2021 by Dave and Neighbourhood Recordings as the second single from Dave's second studio album, We're All Alone in This Together (2021). "Verdansk" was written by Dave and the song's producer Kyle Evans.

== Composition and lyrics ==
On the "braggadocious" track, Dave includes "race-related details" as he raps about using a "'white man’s face' to book an Airbnb", and "flexes his car collection, makes fatalistic references to Call Of Duty: Warzone and laconically condemns Airbnb’s corporate racism". It was also noted that the track "kicks the album off with Brick Lane wisecracks".

== Music video ==
The music video was released alongside an extra verse titling the track, "Verdansk (Survival Mode)" on September 8, 2021, directed by Nathan James Tettey and Dave himself. The video is "dominated by the theme of war to coincide with Dave’s militant approach on the track".

== Personnel ==
Credits and personnel adapted from Tidal.

Musicians

- David Omoregie – lead artist, vocals, composer, songwriter
- Kyle Evans – production, composer, songwriter
- Nana Rogues – flute

Technical

- Leandro “Dro” Hidalgo – mixing
- Jonny Leslie – recording

== Charts ==
Weekly chart performance for "Verdansk"
Chart (2021)	Peak position
Ireland (IRMA)	9
UK Singles (Official Charts)	4
UK Hip Hop/R&B (Official Charts)	2

== Certifications ==
Certifications for "Verdansk"
Region	Certification	Certified units/sales
Denmark (IFPI Danmark)	Gold	45,000^{‡}
New Zealand (RMNZ)	Gold	15,000^{‡}
United Kingdom (BPI)	Platinum	600,000^{‡}
^{‡} Sales+streaming figures based on certification alone.
