= A Fistful of Peaches =

Studio album by Black Honey
- Released: 17 March 2023
- Length: 40:53
- Label: Foxfive
- Producer: Dimitri Tikovoi

Black Honey chronology
Written & Directed (2021)	A Fistful of Peaches (2023)	Soak (2025)

Singles from A Fistful of Peaches
- 1. "Charlie Bronson" Released: 10 August 2022; 2. "Out of My Mind" Released: 5 October 2022; 3. "Heavy" Released: 7 November 2022; 4. "Up Against It" Released: 18 January 2023; 5. "OK" Released: 15 February 2023; 6. "Tombstone" Released: 22 May 2023

Professional ratings
Aggregate scores
Source	Rating
AnyDecentMusic?	7.0/10
Metacritic	75/100
Review scores
Source	Rating
Clash	7/10
The Daily Telegraph	3/5 stars
DIY	4/5 stars
Dork	4/5 stars
Far Out	2.5/5 stars
Gigwise	7/10 stars
The Line of Best Fit	8/10

A Fistful of Peaches is the third studio album by British indie rock band Black Honey. It was released on 17 March 2023 through Foxfive Records.

== Track listing ==
A Fistful of Peaches track listing
No.	Title	Length
1.	"Charlie Bronson"	3:23
2.	"Heavy"	3:24
3.	"Up Against It"	3:06
4.	"Out of My Mind"	3:36
5.	"Rock Bottom"	3:22
6.	"Cut the Cord"	3:32
7.	"OK"	3:44
8.	"I'm a Man"	3:42
9.	"Nobody Knows"	3:27
10.	"Weirdos"	3:37
11.	"Tombstone"	2:39
12.	"Bummer"	3:16
Total length:		40:53

== Charts ==
Weekly chart performance for A Fistful of Peaches
Chart (2023)	Peak position
Scottish Albums (OCC)	4
UK Albums (OCC)	6
UK Independent Albums (OCC)	1
