= We're All Alone in This Together =

Studio album by Dave
- Released: 23 July 2021
- Recorded: 2019–2021
- Studio: The Church Studios (London); Paramount Studios (Los Angeles); Westlake Studios (Los Angeles); Osea Island (Essex)
- Length: 61:00
- Label: Neighbourhood
- Producer: Dave; Dominic Maker; Jae5; James Blake; Joe Reeves; Kyle Evans; P2J

Dave chronology
Psychodrama (2019)	We're All Alone in This Together (2021)	Split Decision (2023)

Singles from We're All Alone in This Together
- 1. "Clash" Released: 9 July 2021; 2. "Verdansk" Released: 8 September 2021

We're All Alone in This Together is the second studio album by British rapper Dave, released on 23 July 2021 by Neighbourhood Recordings. The album succeeds his debut album Psychodrama (2019), and includes guest appearances from Stormzy, James Blake, Wizkid, Snoh Aalegra, Boj, Fredo, Ghetts, Giggs and Meekz.

The album follows the themes of loneliness and mental health, as well as social commentary on the conditions faced by young black people in society. The album received universal critical acclaim, with many comparing it favourably to its predecessor, Psychodrama. We're All Alone in This Together was executive produced by Kyle Evans and Dave himself, with additional production from James Blake and Joe Reeves.

The album debuted at number one on the UK Albums Chart, the biggest album launch of 2021 at the time of release, and the biggest first week sales for a UK hip hop album since 2010. We're All Alone in This Together was supported by two singles: "Clash" featuring Stormzy, and "Verdansk", which reached number two and four, respectively, on the UK Singles Chart. The album was certified Platinum by the British Phonographic Industry.

== Background ==
On 6 September 2020, Dave participated in Soccer Aid alongside several celebrities including Chunkz and Yung Filly. Following the event, the two made a YouTube video covering the event; during the video, they stated that Dave played them a premature version of We're All Alone in This Together, noting that it sounded "phenomenal". Following a 17-month hiatus, in April 2021, Dave released two songs as a two-track EP, "Titanium" and "Mercury" featuring Kamal, labelled as leftovers from his second album. On 19 May 2021, Dave teased the completion of the album after he tweeted, "almost done" with pictures of him inside a recording studio.

Two months later, on 6 July, Dave announced We're All Alone in This Together, alongside its cover art and release date. During Dave's interview with GQ, he revealed that the title was inspired by Hans Zimmer, with it coming from a line that the composer had said to him during a conversation. On 17 July 2021, Dave released the album's official tracklist.

On 2 July 2021, Dave teased a collaboration with Stormzy. The lead single, "Clash" featuring Stormzy, was released on 9 July 2021. It peaked at number two on the UK Singles Chart in the chart week ending 30 July. The album's second single, "Verdansk" was released on 8 September 2021, after its music video was released, featuring an extra verse.

== Music and lyrical themes ==
We're All Alone in This Together is exactly 61 minutes long, marking Dave's longest project.

=== Composition and production ===
We're All Alone in This Together is a conscious hip hop, UK rap album, supported by its heavy production. The album incorporates elements of UK drill, afrobeats, political hip hop, chipmunk soul, and gospel music. The album was executively produced by Dave himself, while the majority of the record was produced by Kyle Evans and Joe Reeves. The production of the album was assisted by James Blake and Dom Maker, with occasional appearances from Jae5 and P2J. Molly Cowan and Daniel Kaluuya, the Golden Globe-winning actor are cited as narrators on several tracks.

=== Themes ===
Despite Dave's debut album, Psychodrama being considered a "concept album", We're All Alone in This Together, is not. The themes in the album vary from topics such as migration and racism to both domestic and sexual violence, which according to Dave, is also portrayed in the album's art.

Other themes in the album include loneliness as well as his deteriorating mental health as a result of his newfound stardom. Dave's loneliness is the key theme of the album, with both the album's title and its artwork playing into it. His loneliness is supported by the likes of his mother, who he states is the other person on the boat in the artwork. In Dave's interview with GQ, he elaborated on this:

My hard and everyone else's hard is a different type of hard. I'm grateful that I'm in a position where I'm allowed to just... I'm OK. A lot of people are suffering, losing jobs. Lives are being destroyed, people are losing people. It's like something out of a horror film. It's dark. And I think that nobody won. That's the only way to describe it. It wasn't like, 'Yo, this thing threatens the world so the world bands together'... Nah. I can look at myself and know that I'm stepping up with my charitable works and things I want to do in the community. And coming outside again, it gave me enough time to realise that that's something I need to do. Politics became so divisive; the world became so divisive.

=== Songs ===
In "Three Rivers", Dave separates the track into three different parts: part one, directing the effects on the Windrush Generation, part two, directing the effects on Eastern Europeans in the United Kingdom, and part three, directing the effects of the ongoing wars in the Middle East. In the eleventh track, "Heart Attack", a continuance of his September 2016, "Panic Attack", Dave covers the topics of knife crime, domestic violence, and the struggles of growing up as a black youth in the UK. The track's outro is by Dave's mother, in which she expresses the reality of a first-generation British Nigerian.

== Cover art ==
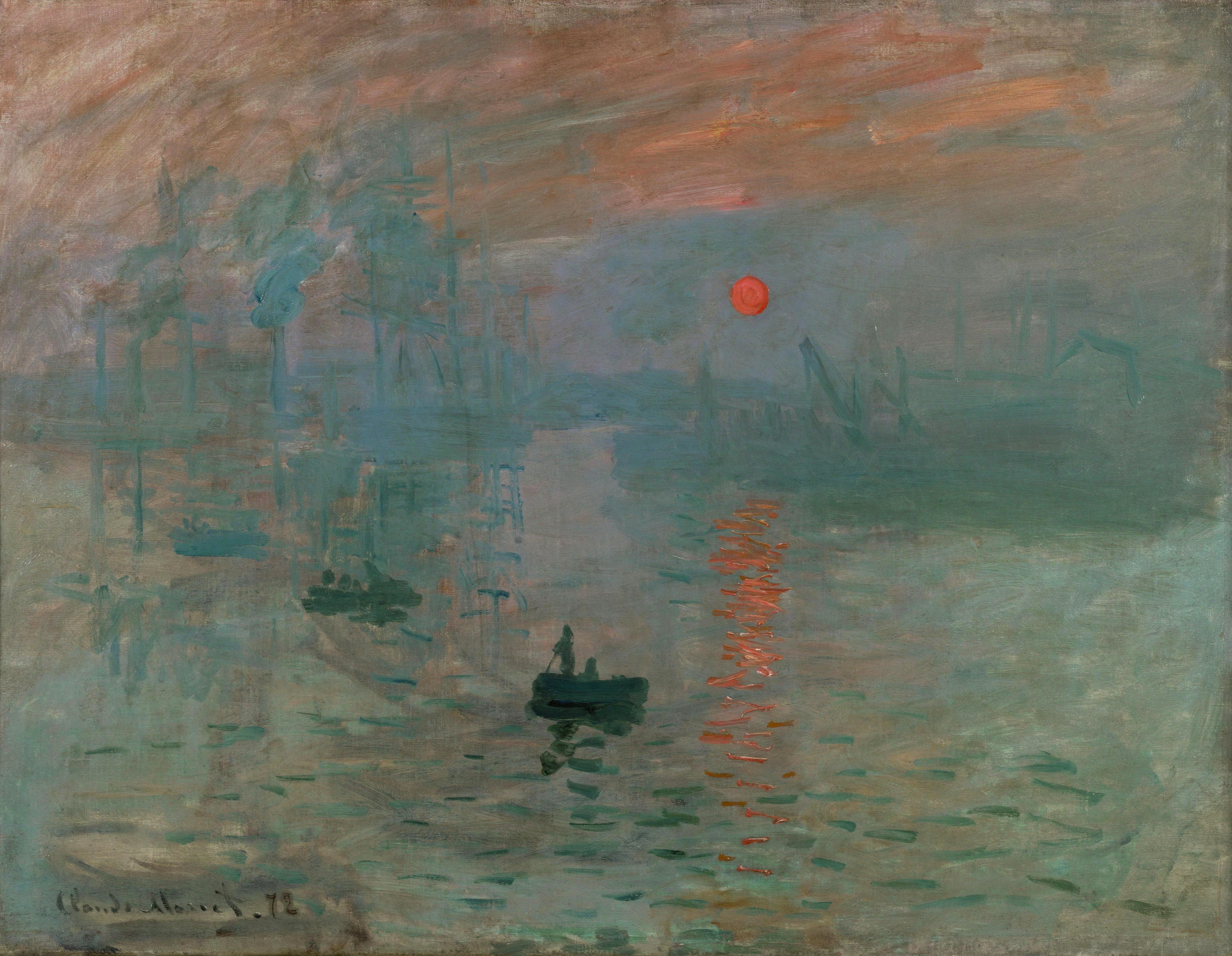
The album cover incorporated Claude Monet's Impression, Sunrise

The cover art was first shared by Dave on his Instagram on 6 July 2021. Furthermore, the cover art plays into the album's title–We're All Alone in This Together–portraying a boat on its own in the middle of an ocean. Dave stated that the two people on the boat represent him and his mother.

The album's cover art is inspired by and incorporates French painter, Claude Monet's 1872 painting, Impression, Sunrise. The original painting depicts the port of Le Havre, the artist's hometown. During Dave's interview with GQ, he explained in depth how the album's themes play into its artwork:

Migration is a massive thing for me – boats, freedom of movement. The artwork represents that – the journey – all at the same time, as delivering life from the perspective of someone who has just come off the back of all this... It’s a massive change in character.

According to Dave, with the cover being a reference to the sea, it represents the water element while his previously released Psychodrama represented fire. During the interview, the interviewer pointed out that the cover "seems as light as it does dark", in which Dave responded, noting how the cover relates to the album's sequencing:

Yeah. It’s that juxtaposition, I guess. The start of it is dark. But I think it’s good. I think it’s really, really good, if I step back and look at it objectively, in comparison to the first – the way I’m programmed to think, the way the producers around me have stepped up: Kyle Evans, P2J, James Blake, Jae5. There is a lot of work with James Blake – that’s why we were in LA. But, to tell the honest truth, it’s hard without Fraser!

== Critical reception ==
Professional ratings
Aggregate scores
Source	Rating
AnyDecentMusic?	8.9/10
Metacritic	92/100
Review scores
Source	Rating
AllMusic	4/5 stars
Clash	9/10
The Daily Telegraph	4/5 stars
DIY	4.5/5 stars
Evening Standard	5/5 stars
The Guardian	4/5 stars
The Independent	5/5 stars
The Line of Best Fit	10/10
NME	5/5 stars
Pitchfork	7.6/10

We're All Alone in This Together received widespread acclaim from music critics. At Metacritic, which assigns a normalised score out of 100 to ratings from publications, the album received an average score of 92 based on 11 reviews, indicating "universal acclaim". Reviewing the album, David Smyth of the Evening Standard called Dave "the greatest rapper working in Britain today". In a five-star review, Kyann-Sian Williams of NME wrote that the album is a "stunning sequel [that] lives up to his debut".

Clash's Robin Murray wrote that We're All Alone in This Together "thrives on openness while refusing to lay down easy answers" and that "it finds Dave asking tough questions, both of himself and the world around him." Murray continues to write that the album is "a step forwards from his debut, it feels simultaneously more diverse and yet more unified" and that it is "held together by the intensity of Dave’s vision, and the singularity of his purpose." Writing for The Daily Telegraph Thomas Hobbs begun to write that the album "digs even deeper into the rapper’s subconscious, giving his fans a cause-and-effect insight into why he thinks the way that he thinks," while the meaningful content of the album "gives you a personal stake not only in Dave’s story, but that of so many other immigrant families, showing the human beings behind the statistics and defining why those with nothing in their pockets might be tempted by crime." Concluding his review, Hobbs noted that the album is an "experience as much as it is a set of songs. The results are compelling and well worth your time, but for everybody who comes away feeling transformed"

For DIY, Sean Kerwick described We're All Alone in This Together as a part two to his debut Psychodrama as he wrote, "while Psychodrama used the framing of a therapy session to look inwards, We’re All Alone In This Together looks outwards." He continued to write and describe the album as "an album that’ll be excavated for years to come, but remains just as impactful on first listen," stating that, "at the rate he’s working at, watching him fill out the chapters to come is going to be a gift that keeps on giving." David Smyth from Evening Standard gave a positive review of the album, noting that Dave is "wrestling all kinds of issues, finding it hard to reconcile the glitzy lifestyle he now enjoys."

Gigwise's Adam England rated We're All Alone in This Together a ten out of ten. He states that Dave's craft "almost belies his age, if not for the injection of youthful vigour that accompanies the emotion and heart." When beginning his review, England writes that Dave is "becoming the voice of Gen Z, the conscious rap baton being passed down and Dave firmly lobbing it into the mainstream." England states that "it feels, and flows, like a truly coherent record," and as he concludes his review, he describes Dave as the best UK rapper, "The best rapper in Britain right now? Even at the age of 23, you’d be hard pressed to argue otherwise."

=== Year-end rankings ===
Year-end rankings for We're All Alone in This Together
Publication	Accolade	Rank	Ref.
Complex UK	Complex UK's Best Albums of 2021	1	
Clash	Clash Albums Of The Year 2021	2	
The Independent	The Independent's 40 Best Albums of 2021	3	
MusicOMH	musicOMH's Top 50 Albums of 2021	5	
Dummy	The 25 Best Albums of 2021	6	
The Line of Best Fit	The Line of Best Fit's Best Albums of 2021	7	
The Vinyl Factory	The Vinyl Factory's 50 Favourite Albums of 2021	7	
Magnetic	Magnetic's 25 Best Albums of 2021	8	
PopMatters	PopMatters' 75 Best Albums of 2021	8	
The Sunday Times	The Sunday Times' 25 Best Albums of 2021	8	

== Awards and nominations ==
Awards and nominations for We're All Alone in This Together
Organization	Year	Category	Result	Ref.
MOBO Awards	2021	Album of the Year	Won	
Brit Awards	2022	Album of the Year	Nominated	

== Commercial performance ==
=== Album sales ===
We're All Alone in This Together debuted at number one on the UK Albums Chart, selling 74,000 album equivalent units first week, becoming Dave's second consecutive number one album. It made for the biggest UK album launch of 2021 at the time of release, beating out Olivia Rodrigo's Sour which sold 51,000 first week. It was also the biggest opening first week since Coldplay's Everyday Life released in November 2019 and opened with 81,000 album equivalent units in its first week. Additionally, it was the biggest first week sales number for a UK rap album since Tinie Tempah's Disc-Overy, which was released in October 2010.

=== Single performances ===
The single "Clash" and two other songs for the album charted on the UK Singles Chart: "Clash" (2), "Verdansk" (4), and "In the Fire" (6). UK chart rules prevent artists from having more than three songs in the top 40 at once; without these rules, Dave's album would have generated further new entries in the countdown.

We're All Alone in This Together returned to number one on the UK charts, on 13 August 2021.

== Track listing ==
We're All Alone in This Together
No.	Title	Writer(s)	Producer(s)	Length
1.	"We're All Alone"	David Omoregie; Kyle Evans	Evans; Dave^{[a]}; Nana Rogues^{[a]}	4:40
2.	"Verdansk"	Omoregie; Evans	Evans	3:02
3.	"Clash" (featuring Stormzy)	Omoregie; Evans; Michael Omari; Luke Grieve	Evans	4:11
4.	"In the Fire"	Omoregie; Evans; James Litherland; Dominic Maker; Marvin Bailey; Nathaniel Thompson; Justin Clarke; Mico Howles; Milton Biggham	Dave; James Blake^{[b]}; Evans^{[a]}; Dom Maker^{[a]}	7:03
5.	"Three Rivers"	Omoregie; Litherland; Evans	Blake; Evans; BKH Beats; Dave^{[a]}	5:32
6.	"System" (featuring Wizkid)	Omoregie; Evans; Joe Reeves; Emmanuel Isong; Richard Isong; Ayodeji Balogun	P2J; Evans; Jae5^{[a]}; Reeves^{[a]}	3:01
7.	"Lazarus" (featuring Boj)	Omoregie; Bolaji Ojudokan; Jonathan Mensah; Joe Reeves	Jae5; Reeves^{[b]}; P2J^{[a]}	3:24
8.	"Law of Attraction" (featuring Snoh Aalegra)	Omoregie; Mensah; Snoh Aalegra	Jae5	3:01
9.	"Both Sides of a Smile" (featuring James Blake)	Omoregie; Litherland	Blake; Evans^{[a]}; Dom Maker^{[a]}	7:59
10.	"Twenty to One"	Omoregie	Dave; Evans^{[a]}; P2J^{[a]}	3:21
11.	"Heart Attack"	Omoregie; Litherland; Reeves	Dave; Reeves; Blake^{[a]}	9:55
12.	"Survivor's Guilt"	Omoregie; Jorja Smith	Dave	5:40
Total length:				61:32

Notes

- ^{^[a]} signifies an additional producer
- ^{^[b]} signifies a co-producer
- "We're All Alone" features additional vocals from Molly Cowan and The Music Confectionary
- "In the Fire" features vocals from Fredo, Meekz, Ghetts and Giggs and additional vocals from Nathan Tettey
- "Three Rivers" and "System" features additional vocals from The Music Confectionary
- "Three Rivers" and "Survivor's Guilt" features additional vocals from Daniel Kaluuya
- "Both Sides of a Smile" features additional vocals from ShaSimone and Nathan Tettey
- "Twenty to One" features additional vocals from James Blake and The Music Confectionary
- "Heart Attack" features additional vocals from The Music Confectionary
- "Survivor's Guilt" features vocals from Jorja Smith

Sample credits

- "In the Fire" contains samples of "Have You Been Tried in the Fire", performed by The Florida Mass Choir

== Personnel ==
Credits adapted from album's liner notes.

- Dave – vocals, production (tracks 1, 4, 5, 10–12)
- James Blake – production (track 4, 5, 9, 11)
- Dominic Maker – production
- P2J – production (tracks 6, 7, 10)
- Kyle Evans – production, instruments
- Jonny Leslie – engineering
- Leandro "Dro" Hidalgo – mixing (all tracks)
- Daniel Kaluuya – additional vocals
- Tobie Tripp – strings and arrangement (tracks 1, 5)
- ShaSimone – additional vocals (track 9)
- Nathan Tettey – additional vocals
- The Music Confectionary – additional vocals
- Molly Cowan – additional vocals (track 1)
- Evelyn Maillard – piano (track 1)
- Olivia Williams – choir arrangement
- Joe Reeves – production, guitar (tracks 6, 7, 10)
- Emmanuel Asamoah – saxophone (track 6)
- Jae5 – production, synths (track 6)
- Joshua "McKnasty" McKenzie – marching drums (track 1)
- Teniola Abosede – choir arrangement
- Aleysha Gordon – choir arrangement
- Nana Rogues – production, flute (track 2)
- Joel Peters – engineering (track 2)
- Luke Pickening – engineering (track 12)
- Leandro "Dro" Hidalgo – mastering (all tracks)

== Charts ==
=== Weekly charts ===
Weekly chart performance for We're All Alone in This Together
Chart (2021)	Peak position
Australian Albums (ARIA)	5
Austrian Albums (Ö3 Austria)	50
Belgian Albums (Ultratop Flanders)	10
Belgian Albums (Ultratop Wallonia)	72
Canadian Albums (Billboard)	18
Danish Albums (Hitlisten)	7
Dutch Albums (Album Top 100)	6
Finnish Albums (Suomen virallinen lista)	34
French Albums (SNEP)	151
Irish Albums (OCC)	1
Lithuanian Albums (AGATA)	51
New Zealand Albums (RMNZ)	8
Norwegian Albums (VG-lista)	9
Scottish Albums (OCC)	1
Swedish Albums (Sverigetopplistan)	11
Swiss Albums (Schweizer Hitparade)	18
UK Albums (OCC)	1
UK R&B Albums (OCC)	1
US Heatseekers Albums (Billboard)	10

2025 weekly chart performance for We're All Alone in This Together
Chart (2025)	Peak position
Nigerian Albums (TurnTable)	95
Scottish Albums (OCC)	18
UK Albums (OCC)	26

=== Year-end charts ===
2021 year-end chart performance for We're All Alone in This Together
Chart (2021)	Position
Irish Albums (IRMA)	28
UK Albums (OCC)	10

2022 year-end chart performance for We're All Alone in This Together
Chart (2022)	Position
Belgian Albums (Ultratop Flanders)	184
UK Albums (OCC)	25

== Certifications ==
Certifications for We're All Alone in This Together
Region	Certification	Certified units/sales
Denmark (IFPI Danmark)	Platinum	20,000^{‡}
New Zealand (RMNZ)	Gold	7,500^{‡}
United Kingdom (BPI)	Platinum	300,000^{‡}
^{‡} Sales+streaming figures based on certification alone.

== See also ==
- List of number-one albums of 2021 (Ireland)
- List of number-one albums of 2021 (Scotland)
- List of UK R&B Albums Chart number ones of 2021
- List of UK Albums Chart number ones of the 2020s
