= If You Leave (Daughter album) =

Studio album by Daughter
- Released: 18 March 2013
- Recorded: 2012
- Genre: Indie folk; shoegaze
- Length: 45:35
- Label: 4AD
- Producer: Igor Haefeli; Jolyon Thomas; Rodaidh McDonald

Daughter chronology
The Wild Youth (2011)	If You Leave (2013)	Not to Disappear (2016)

Singles from If You Leave
- 1. "Smother" Released: 3 September 2012; 2. "Human" Released: 29 April 2013; 3. "Youth" Released: 15 August 2013

If You Leave is the debut album by Daughter released under 4AD on 18 March 2013. In anticipation of the album, a music video for the promotional single "Still" was released on 24 January 2013. It was directed by Iain Forsyth and Jane Pollard.

== Background ==
Daughter formed in 2010, originally intended to showcase the solo work of singer Elena Tonra, until she was joined by guitarist Igor Haefeli and drummer Remi Aguilella. They released the Demos EP which started word of mouth on the band, Daughter self-released their debut EP, His Young Heart, on 20 April 2011. On 2 October 2011 they released another EP, The Wild Youth, through artist-led Communion Records. The latter EP earned praise from British website For Folk’s Sake who described Daughter as "one of the most unique sounds in the pop landscape today." BBC Radio 1 DJ Huw Stephens also invited them to perform a Maida Vale Session for his show. In 2012 the band were signed to 4AD and began work on their debut album.

== Recording ==
Haefeli explained that their approach was that: "We never really rehearsed the songs before recording them. It was really written in the flat and then just recorded in the studio, where a lot of parts came up". The band re-recorded a new version of the song "Youth" in a live setting.

== Release ==
Professional ratings
Aggregate scores
Source	Rating
AnyDecentMusic?	7.7/10
Metacritic	72/100
Review scores
Source	Rating
AllMusic	3.5/5 stars
Consequence of Sound	4/5 stars
Drowned in Sound	9/10
The Guardian	3/5 stars
Mojo	3/5 stars
NME	5/10
PopMatters	7/10
Q	4/5 stars
The Skinny	4/5 stars
Uncut	6/10

=== Chart performance ===
On 18 March 2013 Daughter released If You Leave and it reached number 4 on the UK indie album chart and number 16 on the Top 100. Before the release of If You Leave they released the first single off the album "Smother" in October. It was playlisted by both BBC Radio 1 and 6Music, while being awarded Single of the Week by long-time supporter Huw Stephens. Later on the band released promotional single "Still" which had no official cover and a music video for the song was released on 24 January 2013, directed by Iain Forsyth and Jane Pollard. After the release of the album they released the second single from the album "Human" on 29 April 2013 on seven-inch vinyl. During the week of 5 May 2013, the song "Youth" was released as a Free Single of the Week on the iTunes Store. As of January 2016, the album has sold 74,489 copies in the UK.

=== Critical reception ===
The album has received positive reviews from critics. It was positively reviewed by BBC Music, who described the sound as "instantly enchanting of design", "wholly hypnotic" and "more engaging than many a peer's offerings." The Guardian, who rated the album a three out of five, offered a mixed review, characterizing the sound as "atmospheric, but...calculatingly so, especially set against [Tonra's] overwrought poetry."

== Track listing ==
The Japanese market release has two exclusive bonus tracks ("Smoke" and "Drift").

All tracks are written by Elena Tonra and Igor Haefeli, except where noted.

If You Leave track listing
No.	Title	Writer(s)	Length
1.	"Winter"		4:43
2.	"Smother"		4:02
3.	"Youth"		4:13
4.	"Still"		3:33
5.	"Lifeforms"	Elena Tonra	5:35
6.	"Tomorrow"	Elena Tonra	4:41
7.	"Human"		3:32
8.	"Touch"		4:26
9.	"Amsterdam"		4:03
10.	"Shallows"		6:54
Total length:			45:35

== Personnel ==
- Elena Tonra – vocals, guitar
- Igor Haefeli – guitar, producer
- Remi Aguilella – drums, percussion

== Charts ==
Chart performance for If You Leave
Chart (2013)	Peak position
Australian Albums (ARIA)	50
Belgian Albums (Ultratop Flanders)	56
Belgian Albums (Ultratop Wallonia)	42
Canadian Albums (Billboard)	21
Dutch Albums (Album Top 100)	44
French Albums (SNEP)	109
German Albums (Offizielle Top 100)	88
Irish Albums (IRMA)	24
Scottish Albums (OCC)	27
Swiss Albums (Schweizer Hitparade)	65
UK Albums (OCC)	16
UK Independent Albums (OCC)	4
US Billboard 200	97
US Independent Albums (Billboard)	23
US Top Alternative Albums (Billboard)	21
US Top Rock Albums (Billboard)	28

=== Year-end charts ===
Chart (2013)	Position
UK Albums (OCC)	191

== Certifications ==
Certifications for If You Leave
Region	Certification	Certified units/sales
United Kingdom (BPI)	Gold	100,000^{‡}
^{‡} Sales+streaming figures based on certification alone.
