= Black Honey (album) =

Studio album by Black Honey
- Released: 21 September 2018
- Recorded: 2018
- Genre: Indie rock; alternative rock
- Length: 38:23
- Label: Foxfive

Black Honey chronology
Black Honey (2018)	Written & Directed (2021)

Singles from Black Honey
- 1. "Hello Today" Released: 23 September 2016; 2. "Dig" Released: 15 December 2017; 3. "Bad Friends" Released: 3 May 2018; 4. "I Only Hurt the Ones I Love" Released: 28 June 2018; 5. "Midnight" Released: 2 August 2018; 6. "Blue Romance"/"Crowded City" Released: 22 November 2018; 7. "Baby" Released: 14 February 2019

Black Honey is the debut studio album by British indie rock band Black Honey. It was released on 21 September 2018 by Foxfive Records and received positive reviews from music critics.

The album reached 33 on the UK Albums Chart.

== Critical reception ==
Professional ratings
Review scores
Source	Rating
DIY	4/5 stars
The Edge	4/5 stars
Louder Than War	8/10 stars
The Skinny	3/5 stars

Contactmusic.com stated that the album "blends a mix of Blondie, Elastica, Sleeper, Echobelly and a little bit of The Bangles. The album explores sounds of indie rock and alternative rock, incorporating in some tracks a disco and electro style."

The Sunday Times wrote, "Thrumming with hooks, propulsion and attitudinal lyrics, the band's songs are undoubtedly indebted (here a touch of Blondie and Lana Del Rey, there an echo of Lush and Garbage), but the quartet take these base metals and pound them into new forms. The antidote to manufactured, wipe-clean pop, Black Honey are playing the long game and sounding like winners."

== Track listing ==
No.	Title	Length
1.	"I Only Hurt the Ones I Love"	3:24
2.	"Midnight"	3:23
3.	"What Happened To You?"	3:02
4.	"Bad Friends"	2:45
5.	"Blue Romance"	3:11
6.	"Crowded City"	3:01
7.	"Hello Today"	2:32
8.	"Baby"	3:13
9.	"Into the Nightmare"	3:25
10.	"Dig"	3:27
11.	"Just Calling"	3:20
12.	"Wasting Time"	3:40
Total length:		38:23

Deluxe edition bonus disc
No.	Title	Length
1.	"All My Pride"	2:41
2.	"Madonna"	2:54
3.	"Sleep Forever"	4:00
4.	"Teenager"	3:26
5.	"Somebody Better"	3:31
6.	"Bloodlust"	3:12
7.	"Cadillac"	3:39
8.	"Spinning Wheel"	3:25
9.	"Corrine"	2:53
Total length:		27:03

== Charts ==
Chart (2018)	Peak position
Scottish Albums (OCC)	27
UK Albums (OCC)	33
UK Independent Albums (OCC)	5
