= Not to Disappear =

Studio album by Daughter
- Released: 15 January 2016
- Recorded: Rare Book Room Studio, Brooklyn, New York
- Genres: Indie pop; post-punk; shoegaze; post-rock; dream pop
- Length: 47:03
- Label: 4AD
- Producers: Igor Haefeli; Nicolas Vernhes

Daughter chronology
If You Leave (2013)	Not to Disappear (2016)	Music from Before the Storm (2017)

Singles from Not to Disappear
- 1. "Doing the Right Thing" Released: 30 September 2015; 2. "Numbers" Released: 10 November 2015; 3. "How" Released: 25 February 2016; 4. "No Care" Released: 28 July 2016

Not to Disappear is the second studio album by British indie folk band Daughter, released on 15 January 2016 by 4AD. In anticipation of the album, a music video for the promotional single "Doing the Right Thing" was released on 30 September 2015. A music video for the single "Numbers" followed in November 2015. The album cover is "The World is Spinning Around", a painting by British artist Sarah Shaw.

== Critical reception ==
Professional ratings
Aggregate scores
Source	Rating
AnyDecentMusic?	7.4/10
Metacritic	74/100
Review scores
Source	Rating
AllMusic	3.5/5 stars
The A.V. Club	B
Billboard	3.5/5 stars
The Guardian	2/5 stars
NME	4/5
The Observer	4/5 stars
Pitchfork	6.7/10
Q	4/5 stars
Rolling Stone	2.5/5 stars
Uncut	8/10

Not to Disappear received generally positive reviews from critics. Annie Zaleski of The A.V. Club found that Daughter's "brutal lyrical honesty" sets them apart from musical antecedents such as The Cure, PJ Harvey and Beach House. Sonic Seducer said that the band had created a dynamic mixture of indie pop, folk and shoegaze that reflected influences from bands such as London Grammar and Massive Attack. Marcy Donelson of AllMusic called the album "elegant, moving, and often beautiful", as well as sufficiently dynamic despite its reliance on "sound-defining delay, a dark tone palette, and friable vocals". Rolling Stone's Amy Rose Spiegel was more critical, finding that the minimal instrumentation "can highlight the monotony of Tonra's gorgeous, but largely static, vocal phrasing".

=== Accolades ===
Publication	Accolade	Year	Rank
Rough Trade	Albums of the Year	2016	86
The Skinny	Top 50 Albums of 2016	2016	50

== Track listing ==
All tracks are written by Elena Tonra and Igor Haefeli.

No.	Title	Length
1.	"New Ways"	5:25
2.	"Numbers"	4:16
3.	"Doing the Right Thing"	5:14
4.	"How"	4:26
5.	"Mothers"	5:21
6.	"Alone / With You"	4:33
7.	"No Care"	2:53
8.	"To Belong"	4:17
9.	"Fossa"	6:46
10.	"Made of Stone"	3:52
Total length:		47:03

Japanese edition bonus track
No.	Title	Length
11.	"The End"	5:27
Total length:		52:30

== Personnel ==
Daughter

- Igor Haefeli – production, arrangements
- Remi Aguilella – additional production, arrangements
- Elena Tonra – arrangements

Additional contributors

- Nicolas Vernhes – production
- Joe Lambert – mastering
- David Tolomei – engineering
- Alison Fielding – art direction, design
- Sarah Shaw – paintings

== Charts ==
=== Weekly charts ===
Chart (2016)	Peak position
Australian Albums (ARIA)	26
Austrian Albums (Ö3 Austria)	26
Belgian Albums (Ultratop Flanders)	11
Belgian Albums (Ultratop Wallonia)	53
Dutch Albums (Album Top 100)	32
French Albums (SNEP)	107
German Albums (Offizielle Top 100)	26
Irish Albums (IRMA)	30
New Zealand Albums (RMNZ)	40
Scottish Albums (Official Charts)	18
Swiss Albums (Schweizer Hitparade)	12
UK Albums (Official Charts)	17
UK Independent Albums (Official Charts)	4
US Billboard 200	80
US Top Rock Albums (Billboard)	6

=== Year-end charts ===
Chart (2016)	Position
Belgian Albums (Ultratop Flanders)	190
