= The Nearer the Fountain, More Pure the Stream Flows =

2021 studio album by Damon Albarn

Studio album by Damon Albarn
- Released: 12 November 2021
- Studios: Studio 13 (London); Staðahverfi (Reykjavík); Studio 13 (Devon)
- Length: 39:50
- Label: Transgressive
- Producer: Damon Albarn

Damon Albarn solo chronology
Songs from wonder.land (2016)	The Nearer the Fountain, More Pure the Stream Flows (2021)

Damon Albarn chronology
Meanwhile EP (2021)	The Nearer the Fountain, More Pure the Stream Flows (2021)	Cracker Island (2023)

Singles from The Nearer the Fountain, More Pure the Stream Flows
- 1. "The Nearer the Fountain, More Pure the Stream Flows" Released: 22 June 2021; 2. "Polaris" Released: 6 July 2021; 3. "Particles" Released: 1 September 2021; 4. "Royal Morning Blue" Released: 22 September 2021; 5. "The Tower of Montevideo" Released: 14 October 2021

The Nearer the Fountain, More Pure the Stream Flows is the second solo studio album by English musician Damon Albarn, best known as the frontman of Blur and Gorillaz. It was released on 12 November 2021, by Transgressive Records. The album's title is derived from the poem "Love and Memory" by John Clare. It is Albarn's first solo album since 2014's Everyday Robots. It was originally planned as an orchestral piece inspired by the landscapes of Iceland, but Albarn expanded the project into a full-length album during the COVID-19 pandemic in 2020.

The album produced five singles: "The Nearer the Fountain, More Pure the Stream Flows", "Polaris", "Particles", "Royal Morning Blue" and "The Tower of Montevideo".

== Critical reception ==
Professional ratings
Aggregate scores
Source	Rating
AnyDecentMusic?	7.5/10
Metacritic	80/100
Review scores
Source	Rating
AllMusic	4/5 stars
The Daily Telegraph	4/5 stars
Financial Times	2/5 stars
The Guardian	4/5 stars
The Independent	3/5 stars
The Irish Times	5/5 stars
NME	4/5 stars
Pitchfork	7.3/10
The Times	3/5 stars
Uncut	8/10

The Nearer the Fountain, More Pure the Stream Flows was met with favourable reviews from critics. At Metacritic, which assigns a normalised rating out of 100 to reviews from professional publications, the album received an average score of 80, based on 17 reviews. Aggregator AnyDecentMusic? gave it 7.5 out of 10, based on their assessment of the critical consensus.

In his review for The Guardian, Alexis Petridis wrote, "for all its exhausted, preoccupied darkness, The Nearer the Fountain is a genuinely beautiful album."

=== Year-end lists ===
Year-end lists for The Nearer the Fountain, More Pure the Stream Flows
Publication	List	Rank	Ref.
Mojo	The 75 Best Albums of 2021	43	
The Sunday Times	25 best albums of 2021	4	
Uncut	The Top 75 Albums of the Year	41	

== Track listing ==
The Nearer the Fountain, More Pure the Stream Flows – Standard edition
No.	Title	Writer(s)	Length
1.	"The Nearer the Fountain, More Pure the Stream Flows"	Damon Albarn; André de Ridder; Simon Tong	5:00
2.	"The Cormorant"	Albarn; Tong	4:21
3.	"Royal Morning Blue"	Albarn; Tong	3:12
4.	"Combustion"	Albarn; Mike Smith; Tong	2:53
5.	"Daft Wader"	Albarn; Tong	3:28
6.	"Darkness to Light"	Albarn; Tong	2:59
7.	"Esja"	Albarn; De Ridder; Tong	3:41
8.	"The Tower of Montevideo"	Albarn; Smith; Tong	4:19
9.	"Giraffe Trumpet Sea"	Albarn	1:51
10.	"Polaris"	Albarn; Smith; Tong	4:45
11.	"Particles"	Albarn	3:21
Total length:			39:50

Japanese edition bonus track
No.	Title	Length
12.	"The Bollocked Man"	23:27
Total length:		63:07

The Nearer the Fountain, More Pure the Stream Flows – CD/cassette edition (hidden track)
No.	Title	Length
11.	"Particles" (song ends at 3:21, followed by 0:30 of silence; includes a hidden track called "Huldufólk", which begins at 3:51 and has a length of 19:09.)	23:00

The Nearer the Fountain, More Pure the Stream Flows – Vinyl deluxe edition (bonus 7")
No.	Title	Length
1.	"The Bollocked Man"	3:46

The Nearer the Fountain, More Pure the Stream Flows – Digital deluxe edition (disc two)
No.	Title	Length
1.	"The Nearer the Fountain, More Pure the Stream Flows" (live at Union Chapel)	3:51
2.	"The Cormorant" (live at Union Chapel)	2:49
3.	"Royal Morning Blue" (live at Union Chapel)	3:49
4.	"Daft Wader" (live at Union Chapel)	2:54
5.	"Darkness to Light" (live at Union Chapel)	2:20
6.	"The Tower of Montevideo" (live at Union Chapel)	4:04
7.	"Polaris" (live at Union Chapel)	3:58
8.	"Particles" (live at Union Chapel)	3:19
9.	"Beetlebum" (live at Union Chapel)	4:11
10.	"Under the Westway" (live at Union Chapel)	4:15
11.	"Sweet Song" (live at Union Chapel)	4:08
12.	"El Mañana" (live at Union Chapel)	3:57
13.	"For Tomorrow" (live at Union Chapel)	5:54
14.	"Tender" (live at Union Chapel)	3:56
15.	"Girls & Boys" (live at Union Chapel)	4:33
16.	"The Universal" (live at Union Chapel)	3:45
Total length:		61:43

The Nearer the Fountain, More Pure the Stream Flows – Digital deluxe edition (disc three)
No.	Title	Length
1.	"The Nearer the Fountain, More Pure the Stream Flows" (instrumentals)	5:11
2.	"The Cormorant" (instrumentals)	4:23
3.	"Royal Morning Blue" (instrumentals)	3:16
4.	"Daft Wader" (instrumentals)	3:29
5.	"Darkness to Light" (instrumentals)	3:10
6.	"The Tower of Montevideo" (instrumentals)	4:21
7.	"Polaris" (instrumentals)	4:49
8.	"Particles" (instrumentals)	3:20
Total length:		31:59

The Nearer the Fountain, More Pure the Stream Flows – Digital deluxe edition (disc four)
No.	Title	Length
1.	"The Bollocked Man" (bonus track)	3:46
2.	"Love & Memory (Recited by Damon Albarn)" (bonus track)	3:44
3.	"Huldufólk" (bonus track)	19:10
Total length:		26:40

== Personnel ==
Credits adapted from the album's liner notes.

Musicians

- Damon Albarn – acoustic guitar (1, 6), Elka Space Organ (1, 3–6, 8–11), piano (2–6, 8–11), Wurlitzer (2, 9–11), bass guitar (2, 4), Hammond S100 (3, 5, 9–11), monochord (3), drums (4, 6), Farfisa organ (4), harmonium (6, 9), bells (8), slate marimba (9), Rhodes Chroma (9–11), iPad strings (9)
- Simon Tong – acoustic guitar (1, 5), electric guitar (1–8, 10), drums (9)
- Josephine Stephenson – cello (1, 4, 7, 8), vocals (1)
- Romain Bly – French horn (1, 2, 4, 7), slate marimba (1, 7)
- Rakel Björn Helgadóttir – French horn (1, 2, 4, 7)
- André de Ridder – violin (1–4, 7)
- Alexina Hawkins – viola (1, 2, 4, 7)
- Sigrún Jónsdóttir – trombone (1, 2, 4, 7, 8)
- Sigrún Kristbjörg Jónsdóttir – trombone (1, 2, 4, 7, 8)
- Árni Benediktsson – field recordings: "Ocean at Hellnar" (1, 7, 8), "Wind Outside House" (8), "Birds Close to the Beach" (10), "Under the Waterfall" (11)
- Mike Smith – Elka Space Organ (3–6, 9), harmonium (4, 5), saxophone (4, 6, 8, 10), Farfisa (6)
- Samuel Egglenton – drum programming (3), bass guitar (4)
- Caimin Gilmore – double bass (3)
- Laura Nygren – double bass (3, 4)
- Carol Jarvis – bass trombone (4, 8)
- Shelley Sörensen – viola (4)
- Bergrún Snæbjörnsdóttir – French horn (8)
- Einar Örn Benediktsson – "a Snapchat" (10)

Technical

- Damon Albarn – production
- Samuel Egglenton – engineering, additional production
- Stephen Sedgwick – mixing
- John Davis – mastering

Art

- OK-RM – design, art direction
- Márton Perlaki – photography

== Charts ==
Chart performance for The Nearer the Fountain, More Pure the Stream Flows
Chart (2021)	Peak position
Austrian Albums (Ö3 Austria)	37
Belgian Albums (Ultratop Flanders)	13
Belgian Albums (Ultratop Wallonia)	8
Dutch Albums (Album Top 100)	48
French Albums (SNEP)	15
German Albums (Offizielle Top 100)	35
Irish Albums (Official Charts)	24
Italian Albums (FIMI)	32
Scottish Albums (Official Charts)	5
Spanish Albums (Promusicae)	61
Swiss Albums (Schweizer Hitparade)	20
UK Albums (Official Charts)	7
UK Independent Albums (Official Charts)	1
