= Clash (song) =

Single by Dave featuring Stormzy

from the album We're All Alone in This Together
- Released: 9 July 2021
- Genre: British hip hop; UK drill
- Length: 4:11
- Label: Dave; Neighbourhood
- Songwriters: David Omoregie; Michael Omari; Luke Grieve; Kyle Evans
- Producer: Kyle Evans

Dave singles chronology
"Mercury" (2021)	"Clash" (2021)	"Verdansk" (2021)

Stormzy singles chronology
"Skengman" (2021)	"Clash" (2021)	"Mel Made Me Do It" (2022)

"Clash" is a song by British rapper Dave, featuring fellow British rapper Stormzy, released on 9 July 2021 by Dave and Neighbourhood Recordings as the lead single from Dave's second studio album, We're All Alone in This Together (2021). "Clash" was written by the two artists, Luke Grieve and the song's producer Kyle Evans.

Commercially, the song peaked at number two on the UK Singles Chart, becoming Dave's eighth top ten entry and Stormzy's twelfth.

== Composition ==
"Clash" is a British hip hop track with elements of UK drill, built around a "repetitive, haunting piano" melody accompanied by "spectral, filtered synth." Lyrically, the song features "egotistic proclamations that flex their respective riches." Stormzy's verse includes subliminal lyrics targeted at British rapper Chip, which Chip responded to the same day.

== Music video ==
The music video was released in the evening of 9 July 2021, directed by Edem Wornoo. It features Dave and Stormzy surrounded by cars at the Aston Martin factory in Warwickshire and the Silverstone Circuit.

== Personnel ==
Credits adapted from Tidal.

- Dave – vocals
- Stormzy – vocals
- Leandro "Dro" Hidalgo – mixing
- Kyle Evans – production
- Joel Peters – engineering
- Jonny Leslie – engineering

== Charts ==
=== Weekly charts ===
Weekly chart performance for "Clash"
Chart (2021)	Peak position
Australia (ARIA)	29
Greece (IFPI)	100
Ireland (IRMA)	8
Netherlands (Single Top 100)	87
UK Singles (OCC)	2
UK Hip Hop/R&B (OCC)	1

=== Year-end charts ===
2021 year-end chart performance for "Clash"
Chart (2021)	Position
UK Singles (OCC)	49

2022 year-end chart performance for "Clash"
Chart (2022)	Position
UK Singles (OCC)	94

== Certifications ==
Certifications for "Clash"
Region	Certification	Certified units/sales
Australia (ARIA)	Platinum	70,000^{‡}
Canada (Music Canada)	Platinum	80,000^{‡}
Denmark (IFPI Danmark)	Gold	45,000^{‡}
New Zealand (RMNZ)	Platinum	30,000^{‡}
Switzerland (IFPI Switzerland)	Gold	10,000^{‡}
United Kingdom (BPI)	2× Platinum	1,200,000^{‡}
^{‡} Sales+streaming figures based on certification alone.
