= Written & Directed =

Studio album by Black Honey
- Released: 19 March 2021
- Length: 30:31
- Label: Foxfive
- Producer: Dimitri Tikovoi

Black Honey chronology
Black Honey (2018)	Written & Directed (2021)	A Fistful of Peaches (2023)

Singles from Written & Directed
- 1. "Beaches" Released: 29 July 2020; 2. "Run for Cover" Released: 18 September 2020; 3. "I Like the Way You Die" Released: 28 October 2020; 4. "Believer" Released: 8 January 2021; 5. "Disinfect" Released: 19 February 2021

Professional ratings
Aggregate scores
Source	Rating
AnyDecentMusic?	7.5/10
Metacritic	74/100
Review scores
Source	Rating
Classic Rock	3.5/5 stars
DIY	4/5 stars
Gigwise	9/10 stars
The Guardian	3/5 stars
MusicOMH	3/5 stars
NME	4/5 stars
Under the Radar	8/10 stars

Written & Directed is the second studio album by British indie rock band Black Honey. It was released on 19 March 2021 through Foxfive Records.

== Track listing ==
Written & Directed track listing
No.	Title	Length
1.	"I Like the Way You Die"	3:08
2.	"Run for Cover"	2:57
3.	"Beaches"	3:00
4.	"Back of the Bar"	2:35
5.	"Believer"	2:56
6.	"I Do It to Myself"	3:36
7.	"Disinfect"	2:49
8.	"Summer '92"	3:32
9.	"Fire"	3:17
10.	"Gabrielle"	2:37
Total length:		30:31

== Charts ==
Weekly chart performance for Written & Directed
Chart (2021)	Peak position
Scottish Albums (OCC)	3
UK Albums (OCC)	7
UK Independent Albums (OCC)	1
