= List of UK Rock & Metal Singles Chart number ones of 2021 =

The UK Rock & Metal Singles Chart is a record chart which ranks the best-selling rock and heavy metal songs in the United Kingdom. Compiled and published by the Official Charts Company, the data is based on each track's weekly physical sales and digital downloads . The first number one of the year was "Thank God It's Christmas" by Queen.

== Chart history ==
Issue date	Single	Artist(s)	Record label(s)	Ref.
1 January	"Thank God It's Christmas"	Queen	EMI	
8 January	"Don't Stop Me Now"	Queen	Island	
15 January	"Don't Stop Me Now"	Queen	Island	
22 January	"Don't Stop Me Now"	Queen	Island	
29 January	"Don't Stop Me Now"	Queen	Island	
5 February	"Don't Stop Me Now"	Queen	Island	
12 February	"Making a Fire"	Foo Fighters	Columbia	
19 February	"Iris"	Goo Goo Dolls	Warner Bros.	
26 February	"Don't Stop Me Now"	Queen	Island	
5 March	"Don't Stop Me Now"	Queen	Island	
12 March	"Don't Stop Me Now"	Queen	Island	
19 March	"Bohemian Rhapsody"	Queen	Island	
26 March	"Bohemian Rhapsody"	Queen	Island	
2 April	"Bohemian Rhapsody"	Queen	Island	
9 April	"Bohemian Rhapsody"	Queen	Island	
16 April	"Bohemian Rhapsody"	Queen	Island	
23 April	"Bohemian Rhapsody"	Queen	Island	
30 April	"Bohemian Rhapsody"	Queen	Island	
7 May	"Bohemian Rhapsody"	Queen	Island	
14 May	"Iris"	Goo Goo Dolls	Warner Bros.	
21 May	"Bohemian Rhapsody"	Queen	Island	
28 May	"Zitti e buoni"	Måneskin	RCA	
4 June	"Zitti e buoni"	Måneskin	RCA	
11 June	"Zitti e buoni"	Måneskin	RCA	
18 June	"Zitti e buoni"	Måneskin	RCA	
25 June	"Zitti e buoni"	Måneskin	RCA	
2 July	"Zitti e buoni"	Måneskin	RCA	
9 July	"Zitti e buoni"	Måneskin	RCA	
16 July	"Don't Stop Me Now"	Queen	Island	
23 July	"Don't Stop Me Now"	Queen	Island	
30 July	"Don't Stop Me Now"	Queen	Island	
6 August	"Don't Stop Me Now"	Queen	Island	
13 August	"Don't Stop Me Now"	Queen	Island	
20 August	"Don't Stop Me Now"	Queen	Island	
27 August	"Don't Stop Me Now"	Queen	Island	
3 September	"Bohemian Rhapsody"	Queen	Island	
10 September	"Bohemian Rhapsody"	Queen	Island	
17 September	"Iris"	Goo Goo Dolls	Warner Bros.	
24 September	"Die4U"	Bring Me the Horizon	RCA	
1 October	"Die4U"	Bring Me the Horizon	RCA	
8 October	"Iris"	Goo Goo Dolls	Warner Bros.	
15 October	"Iris"	Goo Goo Dolls	Warner Bros.	
22 October	"Iris"	Goo Goo Dolls	Warner Bros.	
29 October	"Don't Stop Me Now"	Queen	Island	
5 November	"Highway to Hell"	AC/DC	Columbia	
12 November	"Don't Stop Me Now"	Queen	Island	
19 November	"Iris"	Goo Goo Dolls	Warner Bros.	
26 November	"Iris"	Goo Goo Dolls	Warner Bros.	
3 December	"Bohemian Rhapsody"	Queen	Island	
10 December	"Christmas Time (Don't Let the Bells End)"	The Darkness	Must Destroy	
17 December	"Christmas Time (Don't Let the Bells End)"	The Darkness	Must Destroy	
24 December	"Christmas Time (Don't Let the Bells End)"	The Darkness	Must Destroy	
31 December	"Christmas Time (Don't Let the Bells End)"	The Darkness	Must Destroy	

== See also ==
- List of UK Rock & Metal Albums Chart number ones of 2021
