= List of UK Rock & Metal Albums Chart number ones of 2021 =

The UK Rock & Metal Albums Chart is a record chart which ranks the best-selling rock and heavy metal albums in the United Kingdom. Compiled and published by the Official Charts Company, the data is based on each album's weekly physical sales, and digital downloads.

== Chart history ==
Issue date	Album	Artist(s)	Record label(s)	Ref.
1 January	Power Up	AC/DC	Columbia	
8 January	Power Up	AC/DC	Columbia	
15 January	Dance of the Black Tattoo	Magnum	Steamhammer	
22 January	Suckapunch	You Me at Six	Underdog	
29 January	Post Human: Survival Horror	Bring Me the Horizon	RCA	
5 February	Immortal	Michael Schenker Group	Nuclear Blast	
12 February	Medicine at Midnight	Foo Fighters	Columbia	
19 February	Death by Rock and Roll	The Pretty Reckless	Central Media	
26 February	Medicine at Midnight	Foo Fighters	Columbia	
5 March	For Those That Wish to Exist	Architects	Epitaph	
12 March	Against the Wall	Mason Hill	7 Hz Productions	
19 March	All the Right Noises	Thunder	BMG	
26 March	Inspirations	Saxon	Transistor	
2 April	The Bitter Truth	Evanescence	RCA	
9 April	The Dark Side of the Moon	Pink Floyd	Rhino	
16 April	The Underfall Yard	Big Big Train	English Electric Recordings	
23 April	Let the Bad Times Roll	The Offspring	Concord	
30 April	Louder Than Noise - Live In Berlin	Motörhead	Motörhead Music	
7 May	Fortitude	Gojira	Roadrunner	
14 May	Seek Shelter	Iceage	Mexican Summer	
21 May	The Ides of March	Myles Kennedy	Napalm	
28 May	The Dark Side of the Moon	Pink Floyd	Rhino	
4 June	The Blue Meaning	Toyah	Cherry Red	
11 June	Hardware	Billy F Gibbons	Concord	
18 June	Meteora	Linkin Park	Warner	
25 June	Helloween	Helloween	Nuclear Blast	
2 July	Hellbound	Buckcherry	Earache	
9 July	Teatro d'ira: Vol. I	Måneskin	Columbia	
16 July	Origin of Symmetry	Muse	East West/Taste	
23 July	Master of Reality	Black Sabbath	Sanctuary	
30 July	Love	The Cult	Beggars Banquet	
6 August	American Noir	Creeper	Roadrunner	
13 August	The Dark Side of the Moon	Pink Floyd	Rhino	
20 August	The Dark Side of the Moon	Pink Floyd	Rhino	
27 August	The Dark Side of the Moon	Pink Floyd	Rhino	
3 September	Bronx VI	The Bronx	Cooking Vinyl	
10 September	Senjutsu	Iron Maiden	Parlophone	
17 September	Metallica	Metallica	Vertigo	
24 September	The Last Domino? – The Hits	Genesis	UMC/Virgin	
1 October	Marching in Time	Tremonti	Nalpalm	
8 October	The Quest	Yes	Century Media	
15 October	In the Court of the Dragon	Trivium	Roadrunner	
22 October	Reflections: 50 Heavy Metal Years of Music	Judas Priest	Sony	
29 October	The Myth of the Happily Ever After	Biffy Clyro	Warner	
5 November	Hushed and Grim	Mastodon	Reprise	
12 November	Bullet for My Valentine	Bullet for My Valentine	Spinefarm	
19 November	Nevermind	Nirvana	UMC	
26 November	Motorheart	The Darkness	Cooking Vinyl	
3 December	Turning to Crime	Deep Purple	Ear Music	
10 December	Servant of the Mind	Volbeat	EMI	
17 December	BBC Sessions	Green Day	Reprise	
24 December	Nevermind	Nirvana	UMC	
31 December	Nevermind	Nirvana	UMC	

== See also ==
- List of UK Rock & Metal Singles Chart number ones of 2021
