= Black Honey (band) =

British indie rock band

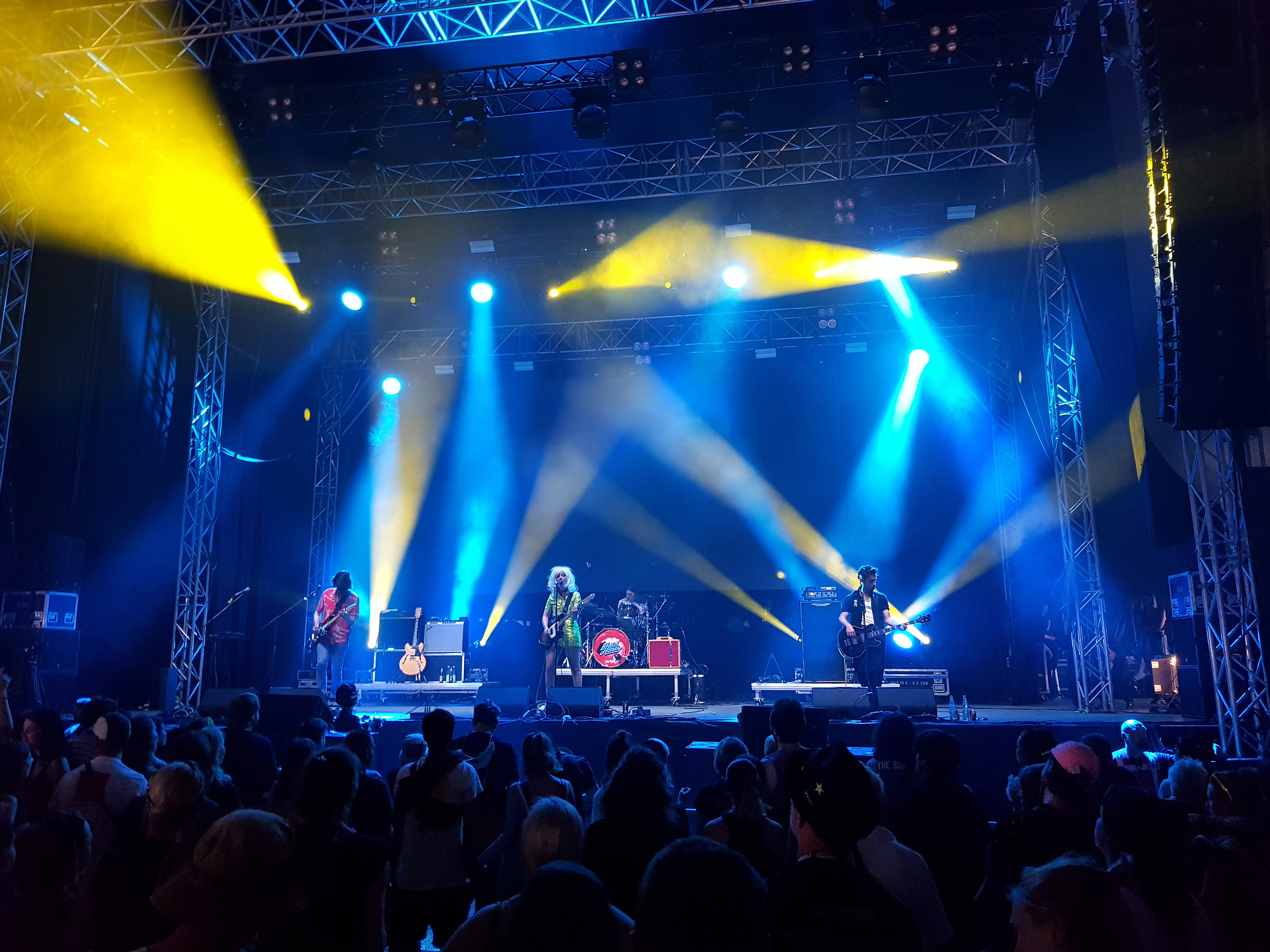
- Black Honey performing live at Southside Festival 2019

Background information
- Origin: Brighton, England
- Genres: Indie rock; surf rock
- Years active: 2014–present
- Labels: Duly Noted; Foxfive
- Members: Izzy B. Phillips; Chris Ostler; Tommy Taylor; Alex Woodward
- Past members: Tom Dewhurst
- Website: blackhoneyuk.co.uk

Black Honey are a British four-piece indie rock band formed in Brighton, England in 2014. The band is composed of lead singer and guitarist Izzy Baxter Phillips, guitarist Chris Ostler, bassist Tommy Taylor, and drummer Alex Woodward, who joined the group after the departure of Tom Dewhurst.

The band released an eponymous self-titled debut EP in late 2014 followed by a self-titled debut album in 2018. The album reached number 33 on the UK Albums Chart. Black Honey released their second album, Written & Directed, in March 2021. The album reached number 7 on the UK Albums Chart.

== History ==
=== Pre-Black Honey ===
Black Honey formed in 2014, at BIMM Music Institute Brighton. Izzy and Chris had known each other for a decade prior to this when living in a squat in Dalston. Prior to starting a band together, Chris and Izzy studied music together at university.

Originally called 'Whats Your Vice?' from 2009 until 2011, the band went through several lineup changes, originally Izzy B. Phillips on vocals and guitar, Chris Ostler on guitar, Tom Chilton on Bass and Cookie on Drums. The band went through a string of bass players and eventually current band member Tommy Taylor joined 'Whats Your Vice?' on drums. They released a song called "Vampire".

By 2012 they had changed their name to 'Kill Moon', with Izzy, Chris, Tommy (now on bass) and Tom Dew on drums. The band released a series of singles, as well as an EP titled Jupiter.

=== Black Honey (2014–2020) ===
Black Honey officially formed in June 2014, releasing their first song under this name, "Sleep Forever", in the same month. Subsequent songs were released to form a self-titled debut EP, released in November 2014. The EP featured the tracks "Sleep Forever", "Teenager", "The Taste" and "Bloodlust".

The band toured during 2015, as well as playing Focus Wales Festival; Live at Leeds; Live at Glasgow; The Great Escape Festival; Wychwood Festival; Croatia Rocks; Secret Garden Party; 2000 Trees; Y Not Festival; Standon Calling; Kendal Calling; and Sunflower Lounge Birmingham. The band generated a lot of media interest during 2015.

In April 2015, the single "Spinning Wheel" was released. This was followed by the single "Madonna" the following July. The band were also invited to do a BBC Radio 1 Session for Huw Stephens and supported Superfood at The Rainbow Warehouse Birmingham on 8 April 2015.

The band continued to tour in 2016, and supported Catfish and the Bottlemen on their UK tour. In June 2016, they released a second EP titled Headspin. The EP featured the tracks "All My Pride", "Headspin", "On Your Time" and "Mocking Swing".

In Spring 2017, the band embarked on a headline UK tour. The band were in the Netherlands for the NPO 3FM festival later in the year. Black Honey also supported Royal Blood on a UK and Europe arena tour in 2017.

On 21 September 2018, the band's debut self-titled album Black Honey was released. The band embarked on an autumn tour during this year to promote the debut album. The band were also in Europe for a headline tour later in the year. In November 2018, the band released the single "Crowded City" with an accompanying music video. This single appeared on the self-titled debut album.

In 2019, the band were reported to be writing and recording songs for a second studio album, predicted to be released early 2020. In April 2019, the band were NME front cover stars. The band did a headlining tour during 2019, and also played Live At Leeds and Handmade Festival, Leicester. During this UK tour, the band released YouTube material titled “le Crousti Garçons”, which was just a bit of fun for the fans. The video for the single "Midnight" was nominated at the Berlin Music Video Awards 2019.

The band continued to perform during the year, including sets at Poltimore Festival, Exeter; Dauwpop Fest, Netherlands; Vestrock Fest, Netherlands; Hurricane Festival, Scheeßel, Germany; and Rock Werchter Fest, Belgium. In Summer 2019, the band performed at Y Not Festival, Matlock, UK; Neverworld Festival, Edenbridge, UK; Grape Festival, Slovakia; Summer Well Festival, Domeniul Stirbey, Buftea, Romania; Reading Festival, UK; Leeds Festival, UK; and Lost Village, Lincoln, UK.

A song titled "I Don’t Ever Wanna Love" was being played in live sets around this time. This song was released as a single in June 2019 with a music video featuring an art deco Ibiza hotel as a backdrop.

Later in 2019, drummer Tom Dewhurst left the band. Alex Woodward later joined the band as the new drummer and percussionist.

=== Written & Directed (2020–2022) ===
The band performed their first gig of 2020, with new member Alex Woodward, at the Green Door Store, Brighton on 29 January. In July 2020, the band released the single “Beaches”, the first from their upcoming second album. An accompanying music video was also released, which was produced “in house” by members of the band during COVID-19 restrictions.

In September 2020, DIY held a week-long 100th issue party. On 9 September 2020, Black Honey held a headline performance at the event under COVID-19 restrictions. A second single was released on 18 September 2020, titled "Run for Cover". A music video for this single was released on 25 September 2020, which was filmed in an empty working men's club. The video was directed by Sam Kinsella, and production and styling was handled by Craig Hemming.

Two more singles were later released: "Believer" on 8 January 2021, and "Disinfect" on 19 February 2021. "Disinfect" was released with an accompanying music video.

On 19 March 2021, the band released their second album, titled Written & Directed. It entered the UK Albums Chart at No. 7 on 26 March 2021, as well as No. 1 on the UK independent chart. On the Scottish album chart, the album achieved position No. 3. On the UK vinyl chart and the UK cassette chart, the album held position No. 2. On the UK physical chart, the album held position No. 4.

The band headlined a ten-date UK tour between 23 September and 13 October 2021.

=== A Fistful of Peaches (2022–2024) ===
The band released the single "Charlie Bronson" on 11 August 2022. This was followed by the single "Out of My Mind" on 4 October 2022, with an accompanying music video.

On 7 November 2022, the band announced their third album A Fistful of Peaches, which was released on 17 March 2023. The band also released the single "Heavy" on the same day, releasing its music video the day after on 8 November 2022. In the summer of 2024, they released a cover of the Troggs' "Wild Thing" for the series My Lady Jane.

=== Soak (2025–present) ===
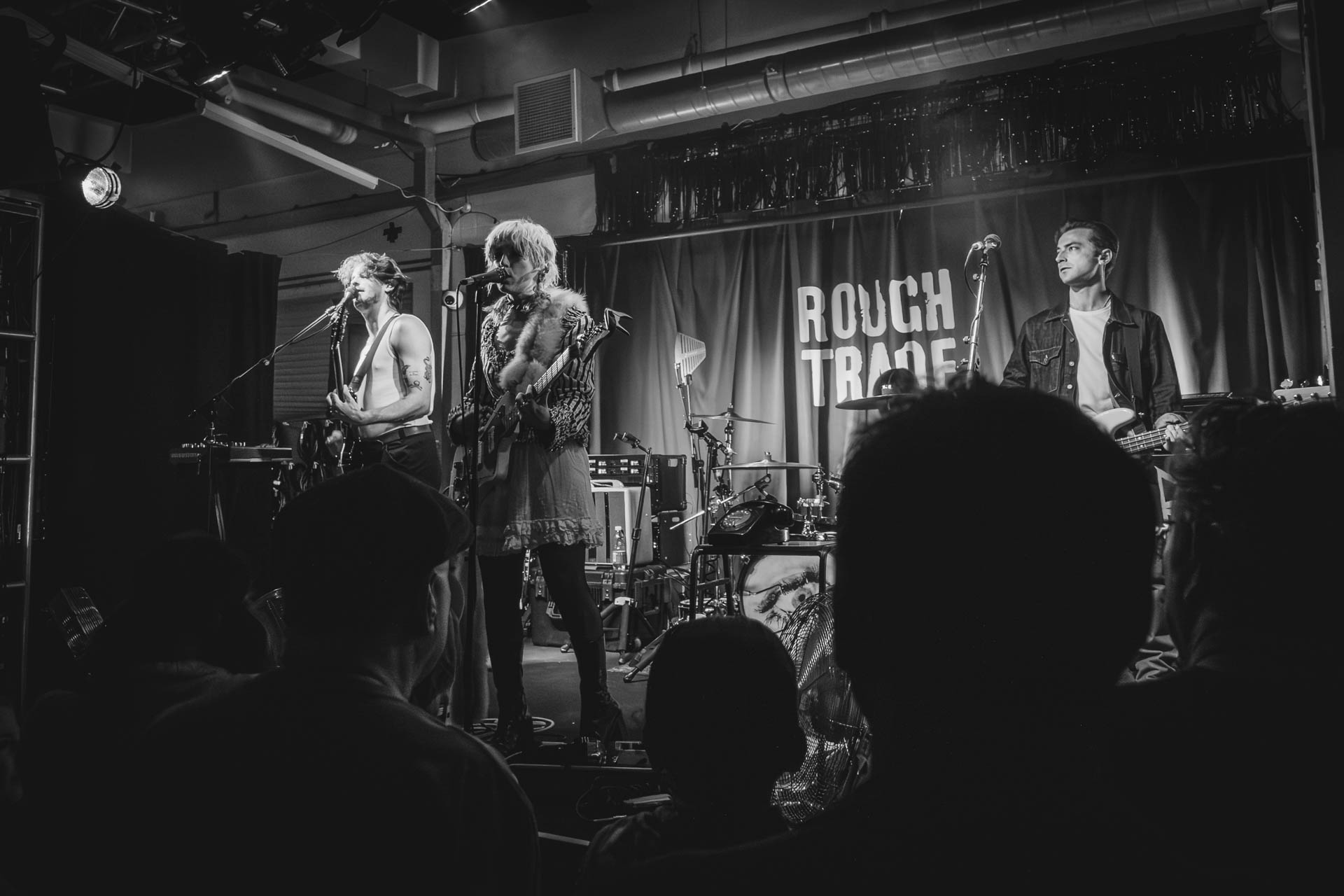
Black Honey at Rough Trade August 2025

On the 28th of March 2025, the band released a new single, "Psycho" and announced a short tour in April, including dates in Manchester (15 April), Brighton (16 April) and London (17 April). During these shows, Black Honey played several songs from their upcoming album, Soak.

On the 15th of April 2025, their fourth album Soak was announced for release on 15 August 2025 and the single "Dead" was released. Both "Psycho" and "Dead" feature on the new album.

On the 14th of August, Black Honey played the first of their Album Release Tour shows at Kingston College ahead of the release of Soak.

Soak was released on the 15th of August 2025 and with lyric videos for "Insulin", "Medication", "Carroll Avenue" and "Soak" also released at the same time

== Band members ==
- Izzy Phillips – lead vocals, guitar
- Chris Ostler – vocals, guitar, synthesizers
- Tommy Taylor – vocals, bass guitar
- Alex Woodward – drums

=== Past band members ===
- Tom Dewhurst – drums (2014–2019)

== Discography ==
=== Studio albums ===
List of studio albums, with selected details and chart positions
Title	Album details	Peak chart positions		
Title	Album details	UK	UK Ind.	SCO
Black Honey	Released: 21 September 2018; Label: Foxfive; Formats: CD, 2×CD, LP, cassette, digital download, streaming	33	5	27
Written & Directed	Released: 19 March 2021; Label: Foxfive; Formats: CD, LP, cassette, digital download, streaming	7	1	3
A Fistful of Peaches	Released: 17 March 2023; Label: Foxfive; Formats: CD, LP, digital download, streaming	6	1	4
Soak	Released: 15 August 2025; Label: Foxfive; Formats: CD, LP, digital download, streaming	31	3	12

=== EPs ===
- Black Honey (November 2014)
- Headspin (April 2016)
- All My Pride (2017)

=== Singles ===
- "Sleep Forever" (Demo) / "Teenager" (Demo) (2014)
- "Spinning Wheel" / "Madonna" (2015)
- "Corrine" / "Mothership" (2015)
- "All My Pride" / "On Your Time" (2016)
- "Hello Today" / "Ghost" (2016)
- "Somebody Better" / "Cadillac" (2017)
- "Bloodlust" / "Ghost" (Acoustic) (2017)
- "Dig" / "Corrine" (Acoustic) (2017)
- "Midnight" / "I Only Hurt the Ones I Love" (2018)
- "Blue Romance" / "Crowded City" (2018)
- "I Don't Ever Wanna Love" (2019)
- "Beaches" (2020)
- "Run for Cover" (2020)
- "I Like the Way You Die" (2020)
- "Believer" (2021)
- "Disinfect" (2021)
- "Fire" (2021)
- "Back of the Bar (Piano Version)" (2021)
- "Charlie Bronson" (2022)
- "Out of My Mind" (2022)
- "Heavy" (2022)
- "Lemonade" (2023)
- "Wild thing" (2024)
- "Psycho" (2025)
- "Dead" (2025)

== Music videos ==
List of music videos
Title	Year	Director
"Hello Today"	2016	Nadia Lee Cohen
"Somebody Better"	2017	Nadia Lee Cohen
"Dig"	2017	Shaun James Grant
"Bad Friends"	2018	Black Honey
"I Only Hurt the Ones I Love"	2018	Sam Kinsella
"Midnight"	2018	Shaun James Grant
"Crowded City"	2018	Sam Kinsella
"Baby"	2019	Sam Kinsella
"I Don't Ever Wanna Love"	2019	Sam Kinsella
"Beaches"	2020	Black Honey
"Run for Cover"	2020	Sam Kinsella
"I Like the Way You Die"	2020	Frances O’Sullivan
"Believer"	2021	Sam Kinsella
"Disinfect"	2021	Craig Hemming
"Back Of The Bar"	2021	Jamie Noise
"Fire"	2021	Craig Hemming
"Charlie Bronson"	2022	Craig Hemming
"Out Of My Mind"	2022	Sam Kinsella
"Heavy"	2022	Dakota Schiffer

== Awards and recognition ==
- The gig at Concorde 2 on 14 October 2018 was lauded in the press as one of the finest of the year.
- The video for "Midnight" was nominated for Best Art Director at the Berlin Music Video Awards 2019.
