= List of UK R&B Albums Chart number ones of 2021 =

The logo of the Official Charts Company, responsible for compiling all of the official music charts in the United Kingdom, including the R&B albums chart.

The UK R&B Albums Chart is a weekly chart, first introduced in October 1994, which ranks the 40 biggest-selling albums that are classified in the R&B genre in the United Kingdom. The chart is compiled by the Official Charts Company, and is based on sales of CDs, downloads, vinyl and other formats over the previous seven days.

The following are the number-one albums of 2021

== Number-one albums ==
Issue date	Album	Artist(s)	Record label	Ref.
7 January	Back to Black	Amy Winehouse	Island	
14 January ^{[b]}	After Hours	The Weeknd	Republic	
21 January ^{[b]}	After Hours	The Weeknd	Republic	
28 January	Music to Be Murdered By	Eminem	Interscope	
4 February	Music to Be Murdered By	Eminem	Interscope	
11 February	Collapsed in Sunbeams	Arlo Parks	Transgressive	
18 February	The Highlights	The Weeknd	Republic/XO	
25 February ^{[a]}	Tyron	Slowthai	Method	
4 March	Conflict of Interest	Ghetts	Warner	
11 March	Made in the Pyrex	Digga D	CGM	
18 March	Do It Again	Gabrielle	BMG	
25 March	Wild West	Central Cee	Central Cee	
1 April	Back to Black	Amy Winehouse	Island	
8 April	Clouds	NF	NF Real Music	
15 April	Back to Black	Amy Winehouse	Island	
22 April	The Best of	DMX	Def Jam	
29 April	Flu Game	AJ Tracey	Revenge	
6 May	Flu Game	AJ Tracey	Revenge	
13 May	Khaled Khaled	DJ Khaled	Black Butter/We The Best	
20 May	At the BBC	Amy Winehouse	Island	
27 May	Be Right Back	Jorja Smith	FAMM	
3 June	After Hours	The Weeknd	Republic	
10 June	The Resurrection	Bugzy Malone	B Somebody	
17 June	Man Made	Greentea Peng	EMI	
24 June	Remixes	Amy Winehouse	UMC	
1 July	Back To Black	Amy Winehouse	Island	
8 July	Mood Valiant	Hiatus Kaiyote	Ninja Tune	
15 July	Pink Noise	Laura Mvula	Atlantic	
22 July	Pink Noise	Laura Mvula	Atlantic	
29 July ^{[a]}	All Over the Place	KSI	BMG	
29 July ^{[a]} ^{[b]}	We're All Alone in This Together	Dave	Dave Neighbourhood	
6 August ^{[b]}	We're All Alone in This Together	Dave	Dave Neighbourhood	
13 August ^{[a]} ^{[b]}	We're All Alone in This Together	Dave	Dave Neighbourhood	
20 August	Back To Black	Amy Winehouse	Island	
27 August	Back To Black	Amy Winehouse	Island	
3 September	Donda	Kanye West	Def Jam	
10 September	Sometimes I Might Be Introvert	Little Simz	Age 101	
17 September	We're All Alone in This Together	Dave	Dave Neighbourhood	
24 September	Provisional License	M1llionz	Ten Percent	
1 October	And Then Life Was Beautiful	Nao	RCA	
8 October	Thanks For Waiting	Potter Payper	0207	
15 October	We're All Alone in This Together	Dave	Dave Neighbourhood	
22 October	Back To Black	Amy Winehouse	Island	
29 October	Back To Black	Amy Winehouse	Island	
5 November	Back To Black	Amy Winehouse	Island	
12 November	We're All Alone in This Together	Dave	Dave Neighbourhood	
19 November	An Evening with Silk Sonic	Silk Sonic	Atlantic	
26 November	Home Alone 2	D-Block Europe	D-Block Europe	
3 December	An Evening with Silk Sonic	Silk Sonic	Atlantic	
10 December	Back To Black	Amy Winehouse	Island	
17 December	Back To Black	Amy Winehouse	Island	
24 December	Back To Black	Amy Winehouse	Island	
31 December	Back To Black	Amy Winehouse	Island	

== Notes ==
- ^{a} - The album was simultaneously number-one on the UK Albums Chart.
- ^{b} - The artist was simultaneously number-one on the R&B Singles Chart.

== See also ==
- List of UK Albums Chart number ones of the 2020s
- List of UK R&B Singles Chart number ones of 2021
