= J Hus discography =

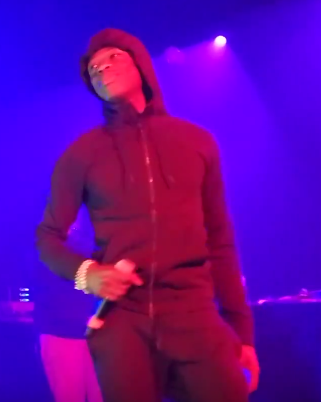
- J Hus in 2018
- Studio albums: 3
- EPs: 3
- Singles: 21
- Mixtapes: 1

The discography of British rapper J Hus consists of three studio albums, three extended plays, one mixtape, and twenty-eight singles (including seven as a featured artist).

== Studio albums ==
List of studio albums, showing release date, label, formats, chart positions and certifications
Title	Details	Peak chart positions										Sales (Note: Pure sales and not equivalent units (streaming and song downloads))	Certifications
Title	Details	UK	UK R&B	BEL (FL)	CAN	DEN	FRA	IRE	NLD	NOR	SWI	Sales	Certifications
Common Sense	Released: 12 May 2017; Label: Black Butter; Formats: CD, digital download, LP, streaming	6	1	—	—	—	—	86	64	—	—	UK: 472,826	BPI: Platinum
Big Conspiracy	Released: 24 January 2020; Label: Black Butter; Formats: CD, digital download, LP, streaming	1	1	83	92	—	—	5	31	—	30	UK: 198,584	BPI: Gold
Beautiful and Brutal Yard	Released: 14 July 2023; Label: Black Butter; Formats: Cassette, CD, digital download, LP, streaming	1	1	70	87	38	169	14	19	21	41	UK: 50,523	BPI: Gold
"—" denotes a recording that did not chart or was not released in that territory.

== Extended plays ==
List of extended plays, showing release date, label, and formats
Title	Details
Playing Sports	Released: 7 October 2016; Label: Black Butter Records; Formats: Digital download, streaming
Big Spang	Released: 30 May 2018; Label: Black Butter Records; Formats: Digital download, streaming
Half Clip	Released: 12 December 2025; Label: Militér Music, Empire; Formats: Digital download, streaming

== Mixtapes ==
List of mixtapes, showing release date, and format
Title	Details
The 15th Day	Released: 27 July 2015; Label: Black Butter Records; Formats: Digital download, streaming

== Singles ==
=== As lead artist ===
Title	Year	Peak chart positions										Certifications	Album
Title	Year	UK	UK R&B	AUS	CAN	DEN	IRE	NLD	NZ Hot	US Bub.	WW	Certifications	Album
"Lean & Bop"	2015	—	—	—	—	—	—	—	—	—	—	BPI: Gold	Non-album singles
"Doin It"	2015	—	—	—	—	—	—	—	—	—	—		Non-album singles
"Friendly"	2016	—	—	—	—	—	—	—	—	—	—	BPI: Silver	Common Sense
"Clean It Up"	2016	—	—	—	—	—	—	—	—	—	—		Playing Sports
"Playing Sports"	2016	—	—	—	—	—	—	—	—	—	—		Playing Sports
"Samantha" (with Dave)	2017	63	7	—	—	—	—	—	—	—	—	BPI: 2× Platinum	Non-album single
"Did You See"	2017	9	3	—	—	—	63	—	—	—	—	BPI: 4× Platinum	Common Sense
"Common Sense"	2017	55	12	—	—	—	—	—	—	—	—	BPI: Silver	Common Sense
"Spirit"	2017	36	8	—	—	—	—	—	—	—	—	BPI: Platinum	Common Sense
"Bouff Daddy"	2017	26	10	—	—	—	—	—	—	—	—	BPI: 2× Platinum	Common Sense
"Dark Vader"	2018	41	22	—	—	—	—	—	—	—	—	BPI: Silver	Big Spang
"Daily Duppy" (featuring GRM Daily)	2019	42	13	—	—	—	—	—	—	—	—	BPI: Silver	Non-album single
"Must Be"	2019	5	1	—	—	—	36	—	—	—	—	BPI: Gold	Big Conspiracy
"No Denying"	2019	33	21	—	—	—	—	—	—	—	—	BPI: Silver	Big Conspiracy
"Repeat" (featuring Koffee)	2020	21	10	—	—	—	64	—	—	—	—	BPI: Silver	Big Conspiracy
"Play Play" (featuring Burna Boy)	2020	11	7	—	—	—	38	—	—	—	—	BPI: Platinum	Big Conspiracy
"It's Crazy"	2023	15	5	—	—	—	46	—	—	—	—		Beautiful and Brutal Yard
"Who Told You" (featuring Drake)	2023	2	2	67	27	28	4	17	3	1	38	BPI: Platinum	Beautiful and Brutal Yard
"Masculine" (featuring Burna Boy)	2023	24	11	—	—	—	76	—	—	—	—		Beautiful and Brutal Yard
"Gold" (featuring Asake)	2025	64	11	—	—	—	—	—	—	—	—		Non-album singles
"Outside" (with Skepta)	2025	86	14	—	—	—	—	—	—	—	—		Half Clip
"—" denotes a recording that did not chart or was not released in that territory.

=== As featured artist ===
List of singles as a featured artist, showing year released, certifications and album name
Title	Year	Peak chart positions			Certifications	Album
Title	Year	UK	UK R&B	IRE	Certifications	Album
"So Paranoid" (Mostack featuring J Hus)	2015	—	—	—		Non-album single
"High Roller" (Nines featuring J Hus)	2017	—	—	—	BPI: Silver	One Foot Out
"Everyday" (Baseman featuring J Hus)	2017	—	—	—		Non-album single
"Sekkle Down" (Burna Boy featuring J Hus)	2017	—	—	—		Outside
"Disaster" (Dave featuring J Hus)	2019	8	2	23	BPI: Platinum	Psychodrama
"Feelings" (Jorja Smith featuring J Hus)	2023	50	32	—		Falling or Flying
"Hollows" (CB featuring J Hus)	2023	—	—	—		A Drillers Perspective 2.7
"—" denotes a recording that did not chart or was not released in that territory.

== Other charted and certified songs ==
List of other charted songs, showing year released, certifications and album name
Title	Year	Peak chart positions					Certifications	Album
Title	Year	UK	UK R&B	AUS	CAN	IRE	Certifications	Album
"Dem Boy Paigon"	2015	—	—	—	—	—	BPI: Gold	The 15th Day
"Bad Boys" (Stormzy featuring Ghetts and J Hus)	2017	22	3	—	—	91	BPI: Silver	Gang Signs & Prayer
"Clartin"	2017	—	26	—	—	—		Common Sense
"Leave Me"	2017	—	30	—	—	—		Common Sense
"Closed Doors"	2017	—	28	—	—	—		Common Sense
"Fisherman" (featuring MoStack and Mist)	2017	47	—	—	—	—	BPI: Platinum	Common Sense
"Plottin"	2017	83	19	—	—	—		Common Sense
"Good Time" (featuring Burna Boy)	2017	88	21	—	—	—		Common Sense
"Mash Up" (featuring MoStack)	2017	—	25	—	—	—		Common Sense
"Like Your Style"	2017	93	23	—	—	—	BPI: Silver	Common Sense
"Sweet Cheeks"	2017	96	24	—	—	—		Common Sense
"Scene"	2018	85	—	—	—	—		Big Spang
"Dancing Man"	2018	88	—	—	—	—		Big Spang
"What Do You Mean?" (Skepta featuring J Hus)	2019	14	3	—	—	37	BPI: Gold	Ignorance Is Bliss
"Stinking Rich" (MoStack & J Hus featuring Dave)	2019	19	9	—	—	74		Stacko
"Feels" (Ed Sheeran featuring Young Thug & J Hus)	2019	—	—	54	77	—	BPI: Silver	No. 6 Collaborations Project
"Big Conspiracy" (featuring Icee TGM)	2020	19	9	—	—	51	BPI: Silver	Big Conspiracy
"Fight for Your Right"	2020	— (Note: "Fight for Your Right" did not enter the UK Singles Chart, as chart rules only allow three songs per artist to chart within the top 100 at a time, but peaked at number 37 on the UK Streaming Chart.)	16	—	—	—		Big Conspiracy
"Triumph"	2020	— (Note: "Triumph" did not enter the UK Singles Chart, as chart rules only allow three songs per artist to chart within the top 100 at a time, but peaked at number 34 on the UK Streaming Chart.)	—	—	—	—		Big Conspiracy
"Cucumber"	2020	— (Note: "Cucumber" did not enter the UK Singles Chart, as chart rules only allow three songs per artist to chart within the top 100 at a time, but peaked at number 41 on the UK Streaming Chart.)	18	—	—	—		Big Conspiracy
"Helicopter" (featuring Icee TGM)	2020	—	—	—	—	—	BPI: Silver	Big Conspiracy
"Fortune Teller"	2020	— (Note: "Fortune Teller" did not enter the UK Singles Chart, as chart rules only allow three songs per artist to chart within the top 100 at a time, but peaked at number 64 on the UK Streaming Chart.)	29	—	—	—		Big Conspiracy
"Reckless"	2020	— (Note: "Reckless" did not enter the UK Singles Chart, as chart rules only allow three songs per artist to chart within the top 100 at a time, but peaked at number 57 on the UK Streaming Chart.)	24	—	—	—		Big Conspiracy
"Love, Peace and Prosperity"	2020	— (Note: "Love, Peace and Prosperity" did not enter the UK Singles Chart, as chart rules only allow three songs per artist to chart within the top 100 at a time, but peaked at number 86 on the UK Streaming Chart.)	40	—	—	—		Big Conspiracy
"Deeper than Rap"	2020	— (Note: "Deeper than Rap" did not enter the UK Singles Chart, as chart rules only allow three songs per artist to chart within the top 100 at a time, but peaked at number 87 on the UK Streaming Chart.)	—	—	—	—		Big Conspiracy
"Cloak & Dagger" (Burna Boy featuring J Hus)	2023	47	24	—	—	—		Love, Damini
"Militerian" (featuring Naira Marley)	2023	23	9	—	—	74		Beautiful and Brutal Yard
"Massacre"	2023	53	28	—	—	—		Beautiful and Brutal Yard
"—" denotes a recording that did not chart or was not released in that territory.

== Guest appearances ==
List of non-single guest appearances, showing year released, other artist(s), and album name
Title	Year	Other artist(s)	Album
"Lukatar" (Remix)	2015	Lady Leshurr, Scratchy, Frisco, Flirta D, Gods Gift, Bonkaz, Jamakabi, Bugzy Malone, Grizzy	Non-album remix
"Like Me"	2015	Ca$ha	Gassin Was the Case
"100 Friends"	2015	Tinie Tempah	Junk Food
"Solo One"	2016	None	BrOTHERHOOD (Original Soundtrack)
"Lose Your Head"	2016	Katy B, TheHeavyTrackerz, D Double E	Honey
"Liar Liar" (Remix)	2016	Mostack, Krept & Konan	Non-album remix
"Bad Boys"	2017	Stormzy, Ghetts	Gang Signs & Prayer
"Dealers & Robbers"	2017	Mostack	High Street Kid
"Get a Stack"	2017	Krept & Konan	7 Days
"What Do You Mean?"	2019	Skepta	Ignorance Is Bliss
"Stinking Rich"	2019	MoStack, Dave	Stacko
"Feels"	2019	Ed Sheeran, Young Thug	No.6 Collaborations Project
"Cloak & Dagger"	2022	Burna Boy	Love, Damini
"Feelings"	2023	Jorja Smith	Falling or Flying
