= Brit Award for British Album of the Year =

British music award

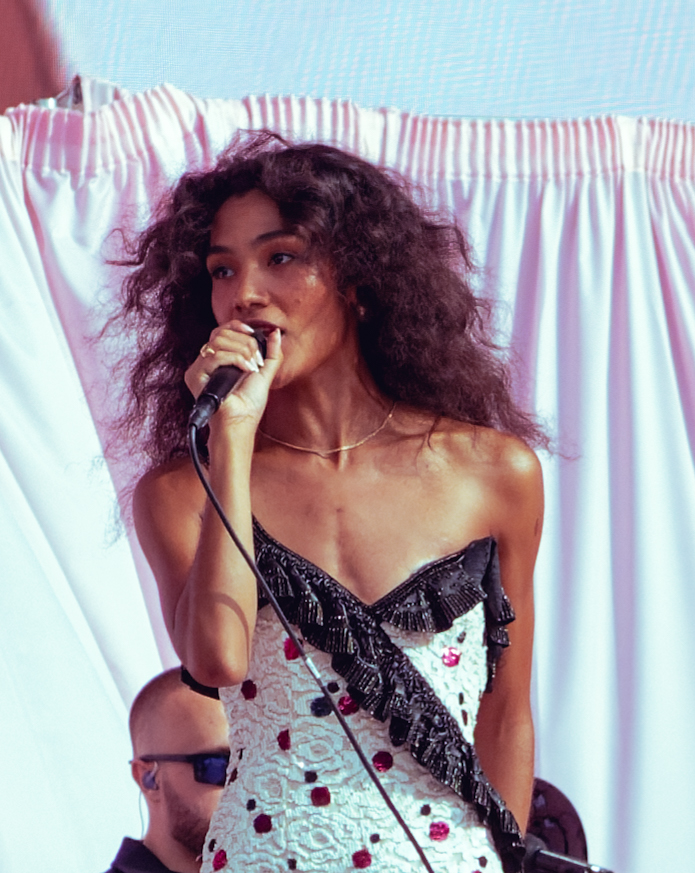
- 2026 winner: Olivia Dean
- Awarded for: Achievement in excellence British album
- Country: United Kingdom (UK)
- Presented by: British Phonographic Industry (BPI)
- First award: 1977
- Currently held by: Olivia Dean – The Art of Loving (2026)

Highlights
- Most awards: Adele; Arctic Monkeys; Coldplay (3 each)
- Most nominations: Coldplay (6)
- Website: www.brits.co.uk

The Brit Award for British Album of the Year is given annually by the British Phonographic Industry (BPI), which represents record companies and artists in the United Kingdom. The accolade is presented at the Brit Awards, an annual celebration of British and international music. Winners and nominees are determined by the Brit Awards voting academy, which has over one thousand members: record labels, publishers, managers, agents, and media, as well as prior winners and nominees. The award was first presented in 1977 as British Album of the Year. In 1983 and 1984, the award was non-competitive and determined by highest album sales. Album of the Year is generally seen as the Brit Awards' most prestigious honour.

The inaugural recipients of the award were The Beatles in 1977 for Sgt. Pepper's Lonely Hearts Club Band. The first solo artist to win the award competitively was Phil Collins, who won in 1986 for his third studio album, No Jacket Required, with Annie Lennox becoming the first solo female artist to win in 1993. Adele, Arctic Monkeys, and Coldplay hold the record for most wins in the category with three, with two-time winners Manic Street Preachers being the only other act to win more than once. Radiohead hold the record for most nominations without a win, with five. The current holder of the award is Olivia Dean, who won it in 2026 for her album The Art of Loving.

== Achievements ==
Coldplay (2001, 2003, 2006), Arctic Monkeys (2007, 2008, 2014), and Adele (2012, 2016, 2022) are the biggest winners in this category with three wins. They are followed by Manic Street Preachers (1997, 1999) with two victories. Ed Sheeran leads solo performers, with four nods. Among female artists, Adele leads with three nominations, winning each time she was nominated. Damon Albarn has the most nominations of any individual, with six, owing to his membership of both Blur and Gorillaz. Albarn ties with Coldplay for most nominations in the category.

Arctic Monkeys won in 2007 and 2008 for Whatever People Say I Am, That's What I'm Not and Favourite Worst Nightmare, making them the only consecutive winners.

In 1983, Barbra Streisand became the first woman to receive the award for Memories, which she did non-competitively for the year's best-selling album. Memories holds a unique distinction as the only compilation rather than a studio album to ever win the award. In 1993, Annie Lennox became the first female solo artist to win the competitive award for Diva. Adele is the first female artist and solo act to win the award multiple times, for 21, 25, and 30.

The youngest artist to win in the category is Dave who was 21 when he won for his debut album Psychodrama, released in 2020.

Only two non-UK artists have received the award: Barbra Streisand in 1983 for Memories and Michael Jackson in 1984 for Thriller, which was the only time the award was given to the winner without any other nominees. Those albums are notable as the only non-competitive winners in the award's history, with the award both times given directly to the year's highest-selling album. Only two other non-British artists have been nominated; The Kids from "Fame" in 1983 for The Kids from "Fame" and Irish band U2 in 1985 for The Unforgettable Fire, the latter also being the only nominee to be neither British nor American.

To date, 15 artists have won Album of the Year with their debut albums: Sade, Fairground Attraction, Seal, Coldplay, Dido, The Darkness, Keane, Arctic Monkeys, Duffy, Florence and the Machine, Mumford & Sons, Emeli Sandé, Stormzy, Dave, and Raye. Technically, Annie Lennox also won for her debut solo album, though she had already released eight albums as a member of Eurythmics, including two that were nominated in this category.

== Recipients ==
=== 1970s ===
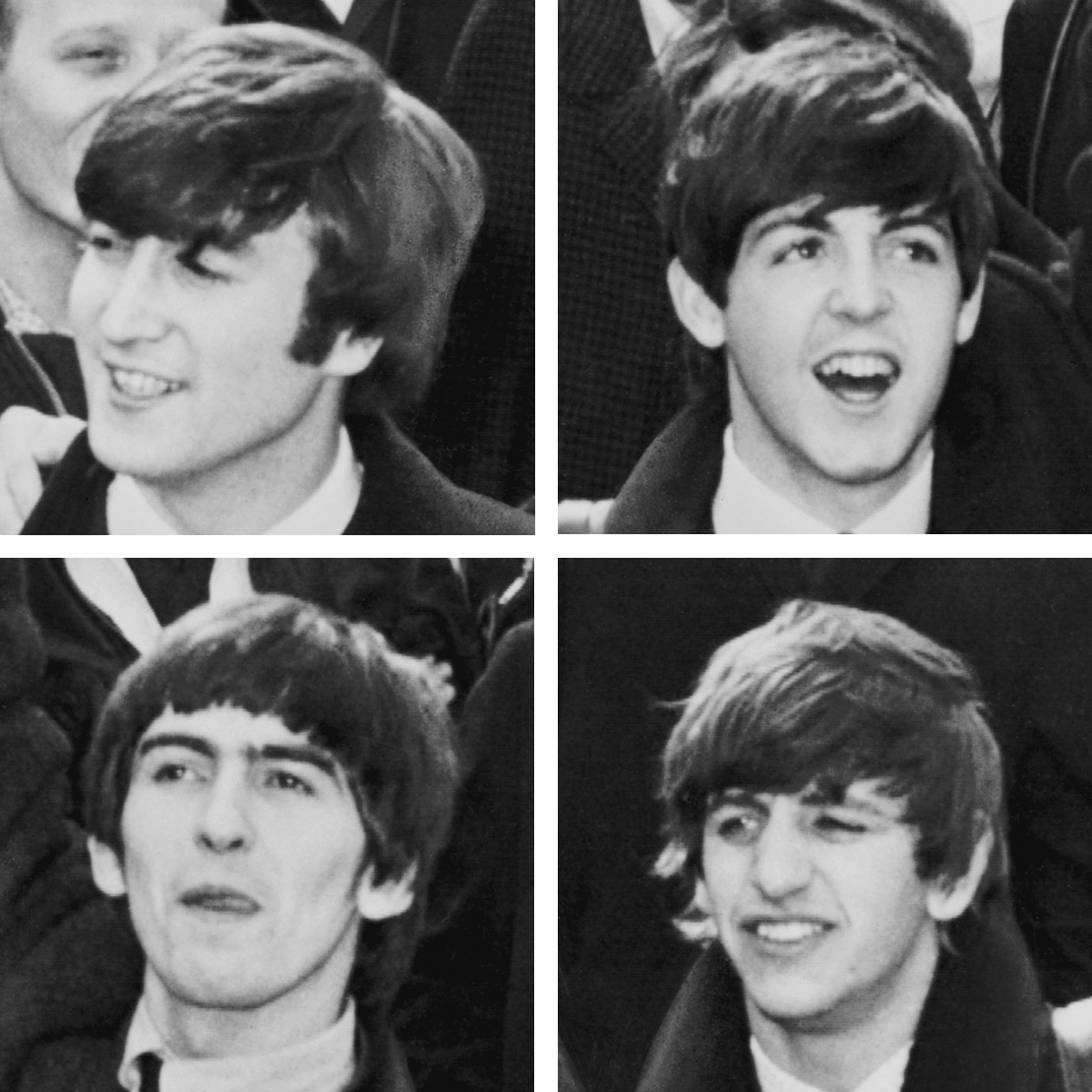
Inaugural recipients The Beatles

Year	Album	Artist(s)
1977 (1st)
1977 (1st)	Sgt. Pepper's Lonely Hearts Club Band	The Beatles
1977 (1st)	The Dark Side of the Moon	Pink Floyd
1977 (1st)	Goodbye Yellow Brick Road	Elton John
1977 (1st)	Tubular Bells	Mike Oldfield

=== 1980s ===
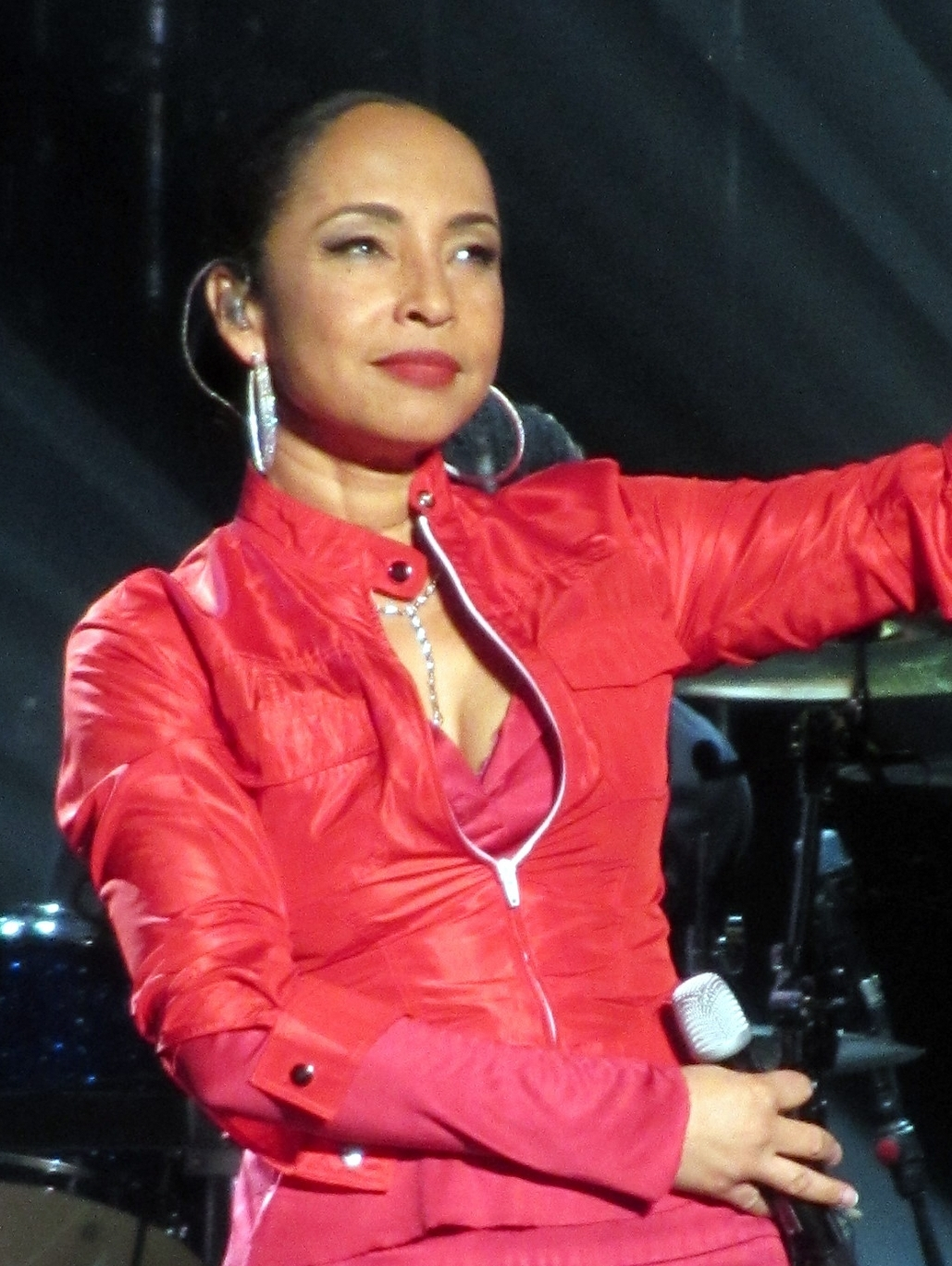
Sade received the award in 1985

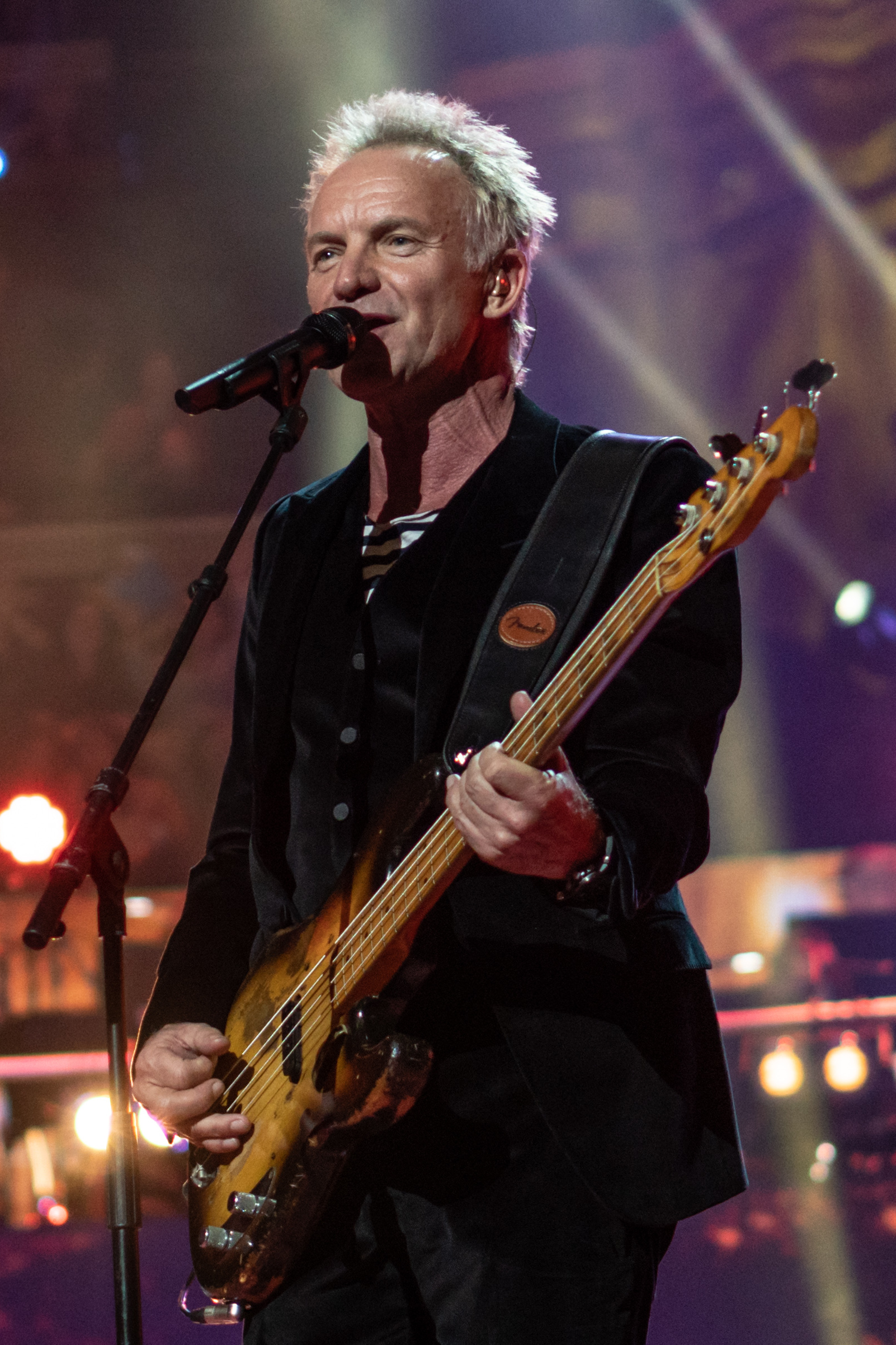
1988 winner Sting

Year	Album	Artist(s)
1982 (2nd)
1982 (2nd)	Kings of the Wild Frontier	Adam and the Ants
1982 (2nd)	Dare	The Human League
1982 (2nd)	Greatest Hits	Queen
1983 (3rd)
1983 (3rd)	Memories	Barbra Streisand
1983 (3rd)	Complete Madness	Madness
1983 (3rd)	The Kids from "Fame"	The Kids from "Fame"
1984 (4th)
1984 (4th)	Thriller	Michael Jackson
1985 (5th)
1985 (5th)	Diamond Life	Sade
1985 (5th)	Human Racing	Nik Kershaw
1985 (5th)	The Unforgettable Fire	U2
1985 (5th)	Welcome to the Pleasuredome	Frankie Goes to Hollywood
1985 (5th)	The Works	Queen
1986 (6th)
1986 (6th)	No Jacket Required	Phil Collins
1986 (6th)	Be Yourself Tonight	Eurythmics
1986 (6th)	Brothers in Arms	Dire Straits
1986 (6th)	Hounds of Love	Kate Bush
1986 (6th)	Songs from the Big Chair	Tears for Fears
1987 (7th)
1987 (7th)	Brothers in Arms	Dire Straits
1987 (7th)	London 0 Hull 4	The Housemartins
1987 (7th)	Picture Book	Simply Red
1987 (7th)	Silk & Steel	Five Star
1987 (7th)	So	Peter Gabriel
1988 (8th)
1988 (8th)	...Nothing Like the Sun	Sting
1988 (8th)	Actually	Pet Shop Boys
1988 (8th)	Bridge of Spies	T'Pau
1988 (8th)	Faith	George Michael
1988 (8th)	It's Better to Travel	Swing Out Sister
1989 (9th)
1989 (9th)	The First of a Million Kisses	Fairground Attraction
1989 (9th)	Introspective	Pet Shop Boys
1989 (9th)	Love	Aztec Camera
1989 (9th)	Roll with It	Steve Winwood
1989 (9th)	To Whom It May Concern	The Pasadenas

=== 1990s ===
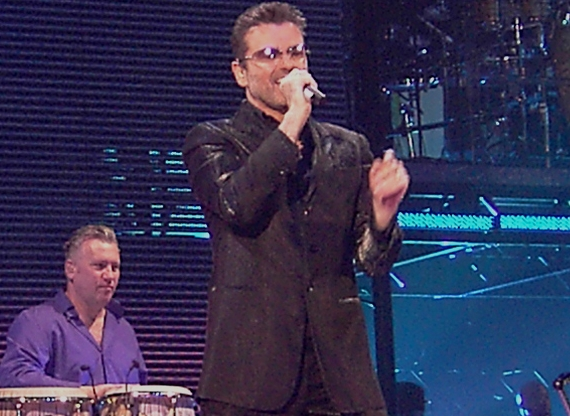
1991 winner George Michael

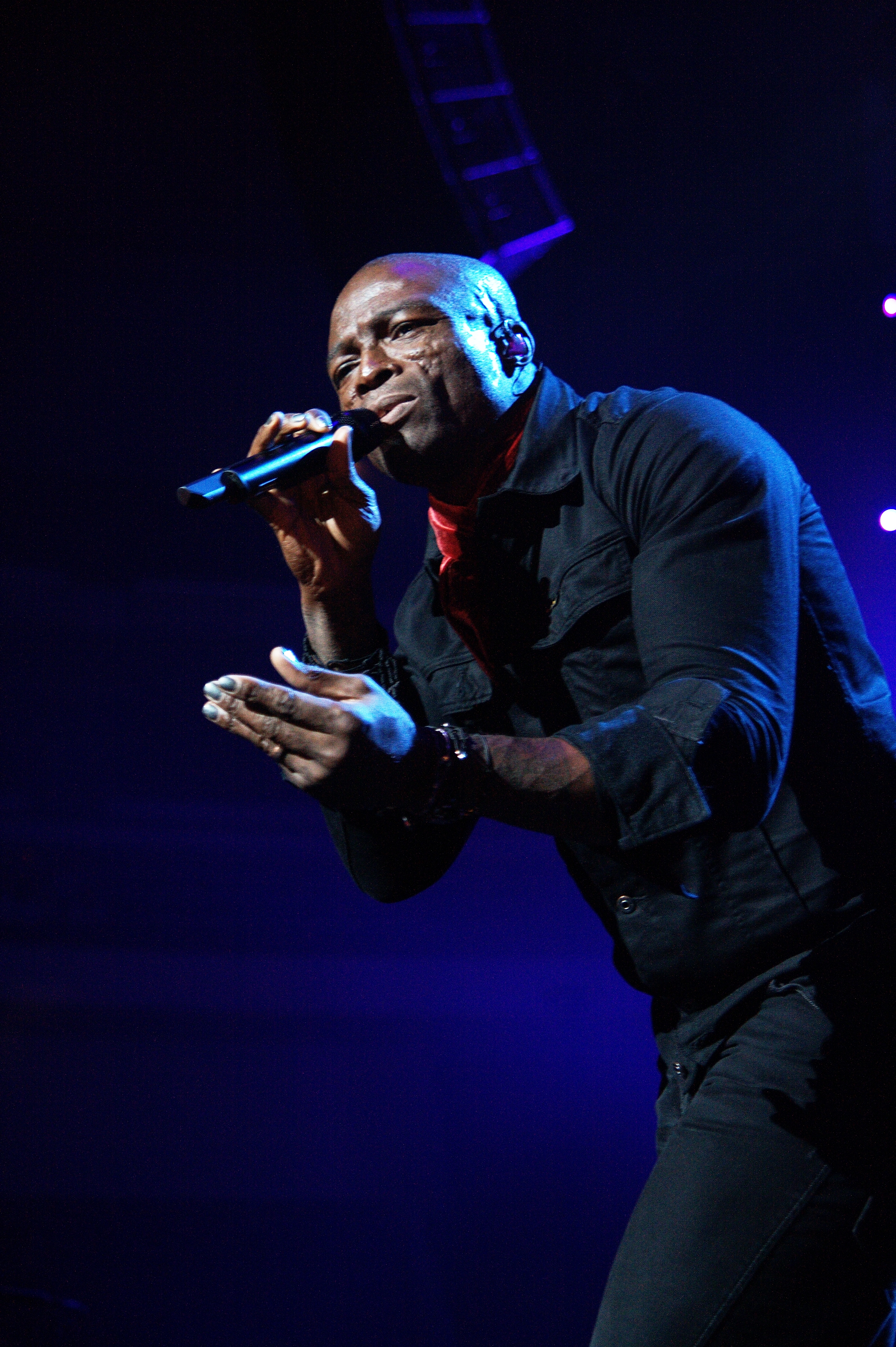
Seal won for his eponymous debut album

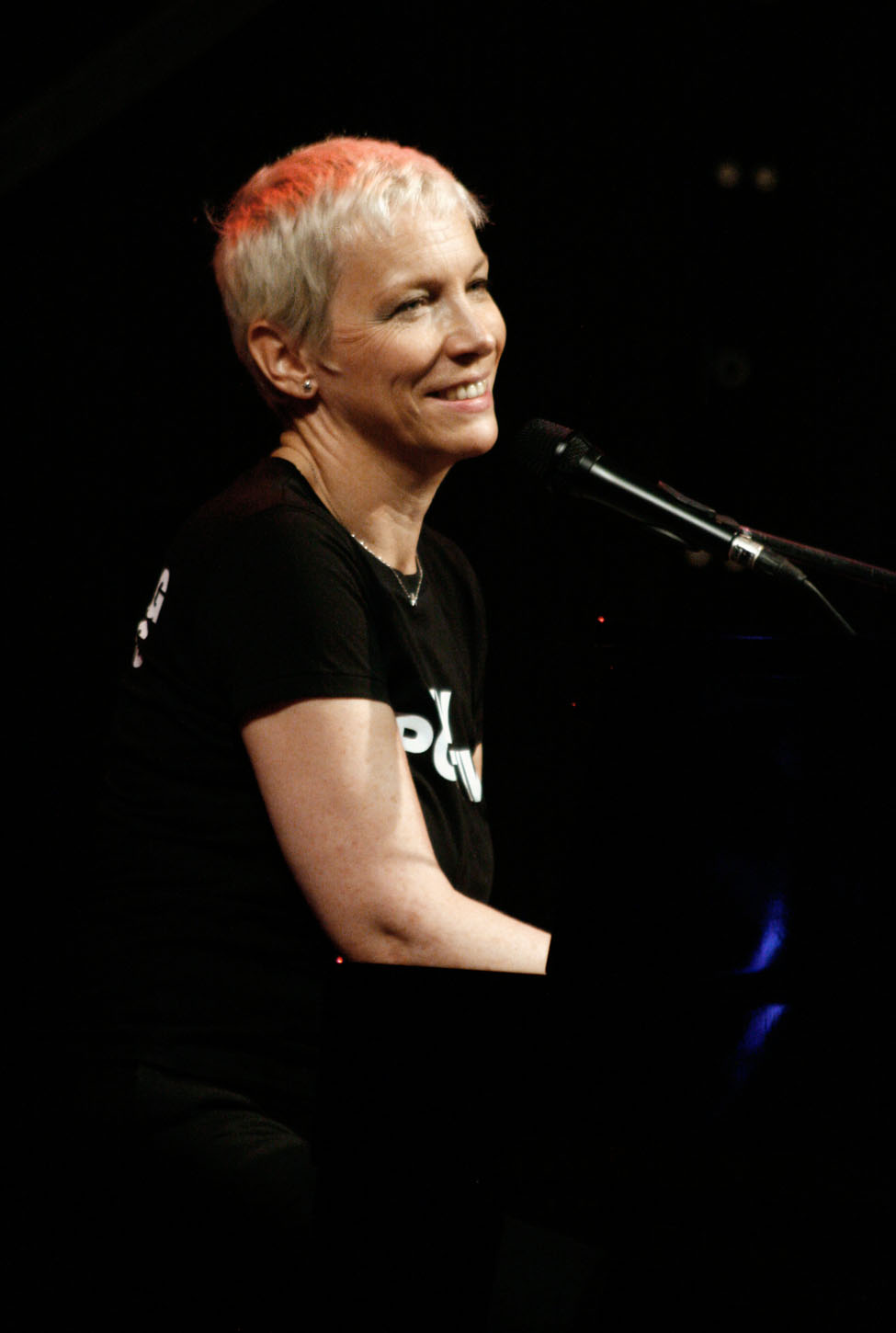
Annie Lennox received the award in 1993 for her iconic album Diva

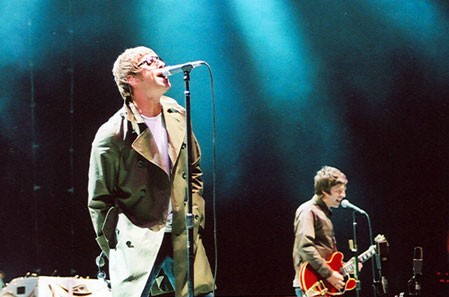
Oasis won for their sophomore album (What's the Story) Morning Glory?

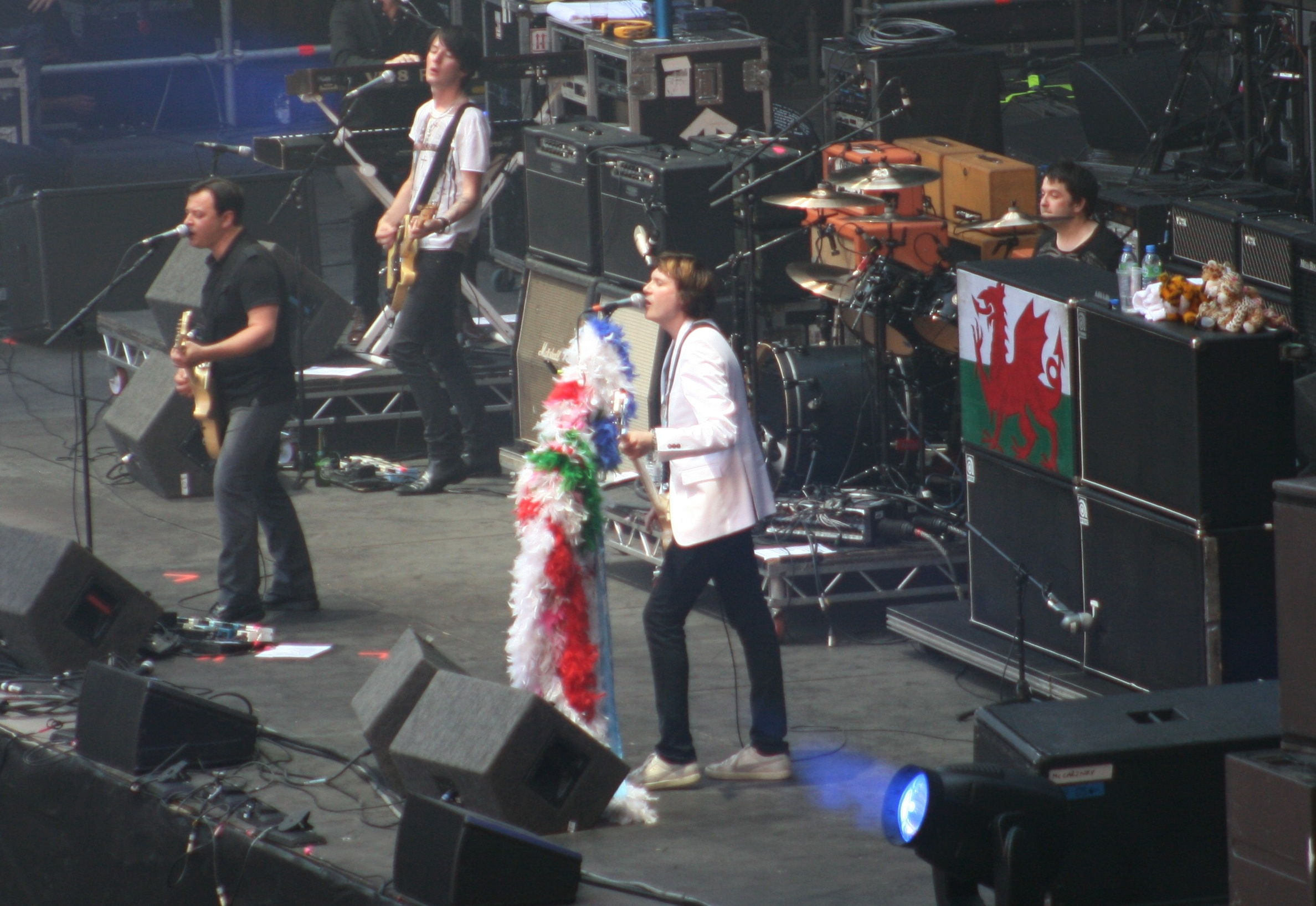
Manic Street Preachers were the first artists to win the award twice

Year	Album	Artist(s)
1990 (10th)
1990 (10th)	The Raw and the Cooked	Fine Young Cannibals
1990 (10th)	Club Classics Vol. One	Soul II Soul
1990 (10th)	A New Flame	Simply Red
1990 (10th)	The Seeds of Love	Tears for Fears
1990 (10th)	We Too Are One	Eurythmics
1991 (11th)
1991 (11th)	Listen Without Prejudice Vol. 1	George Michael
1991 (11th)	Affection	Lisa Stansfield
1991 (11th)	Choke	The Beautiful South
1991 (11th)	Enlightenment	Van Morrison
1991 (11th)	Jordan: The Comeback	Prefab Sprout
1991 (11th)	Sleeping with the Past	Elton John
1992 (12th)
1992 (12th)	Seal	Seal
1992 (12th)	Beverley Craven	Beverley Craven
1992 (12th)	Blue Lines	Massive Attack
1992 (12th)	Stars	Simply Red
1992 (12th)	The White Room	The KLF
1993 (13th)
1993 (13th)	Diva	Annie Lennox
1993 (13th)	Hormonally Yours	Shakespears Sister
1993 (13th)	The One	Elton John
1993 (13th)	U.F.Orb	The Orb
1993 (13th)	Up	Right Said Fred
1993 (13th)	We Can't Dance	Genesis
1994 (14th)
1994 (14th)	Connected	Stereo MC's
1994 (14th)	Emergency on Planet Earth	Jamiroquai
1994 (14th)	So Close	Dina Carroll
1994 (14th)	Suede	Suede
1994 (14th)	Ten Summoner's Tales	Sting
1995 (15th)
1995 (15th)	Parklife	Blur
1995 (15th)	Always & Forever	Eternal
1995 (15th)	Definitely Maybe	Oasis
1995 (15th)	The Division Bell	Pink Floyd
1995 (15th)	Protection	Massive Attack
1996 (16th)
1996 (16th)	(What's the Story) Morning Glory?	Oasis
1996 (16th)	The Bends	Radiohead
1996 (16th)	Different Class	Pulp
1996 (16th)	The Great Escape	Blur
1996 (16th)	Stanley Road	Paul Weller
1997 (17th)
1997 (17th)	Everything Must Go	Manic Street Preachers
1997 (17th)	K	Kula Shaker
1997 (17th)	Moseley Shoals	Ocean Colour Scene
1997 (17th)	Ocean Drive	Lighthouse Family
1997 (17th)	Older	George Michael
1998 (18th)
1998 (18th)	Urban Hymns	The Verve
1998 (18th)	Be Here Now	Oasis
1998 (18th)	The Fat of the Land	The Prodigy
1998 (18th)	OK Computer	Radiohead
1998 (18th)	White on Blonde	Texas
1999 (19th)
1999 (19th)	This Is My Truth Tell Me Yours	Manic Street Preachers
1999 (19th)	Bring It On	Gomez
1999 (19th)	I've Been Expecting You	Robbie Williams
1999 (19th)	International Velvet	Catatonia
1999 (19th)	Mezzanine	Massive Attack

=== 2000s ===
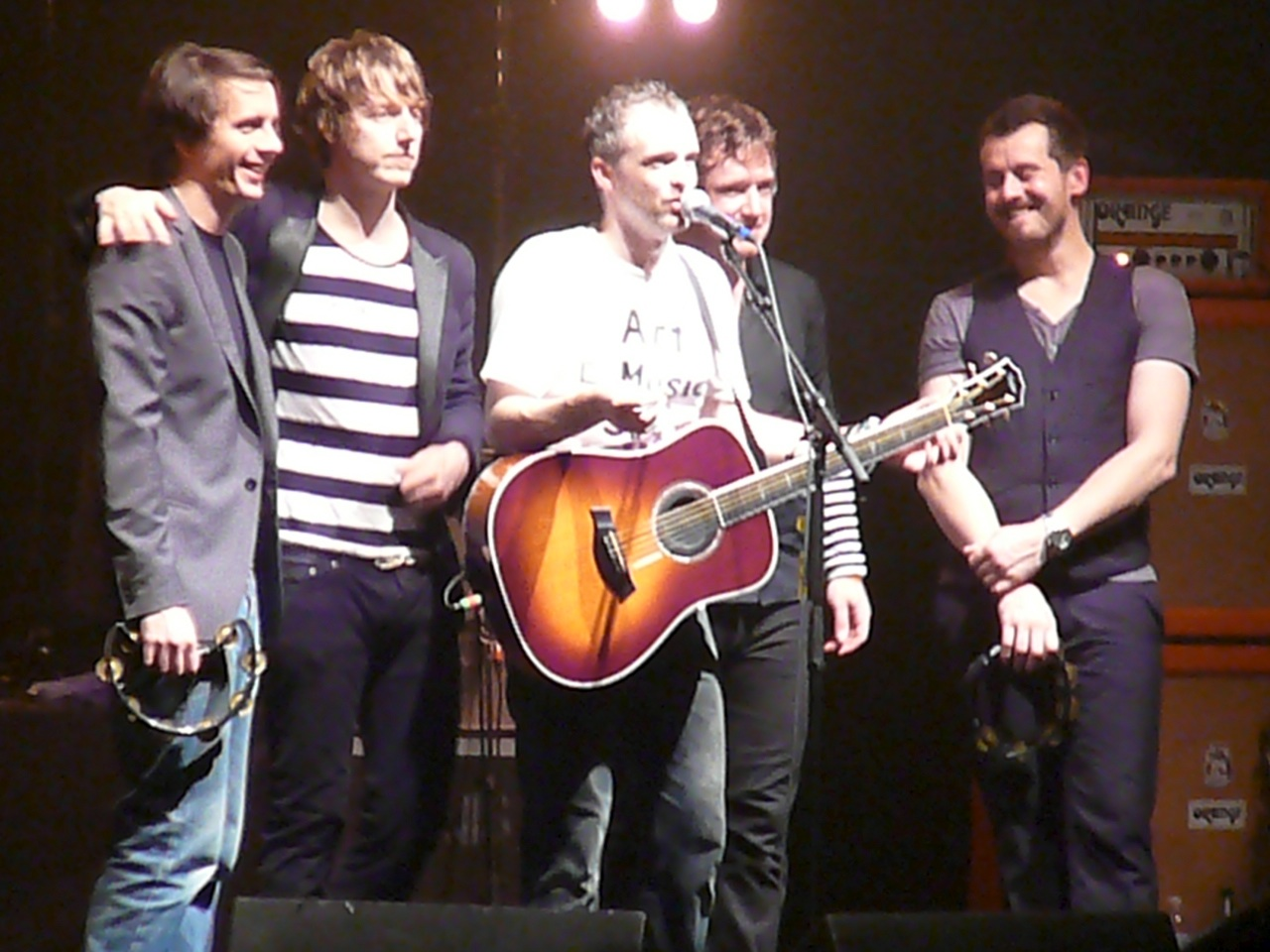
2000 winners Travis

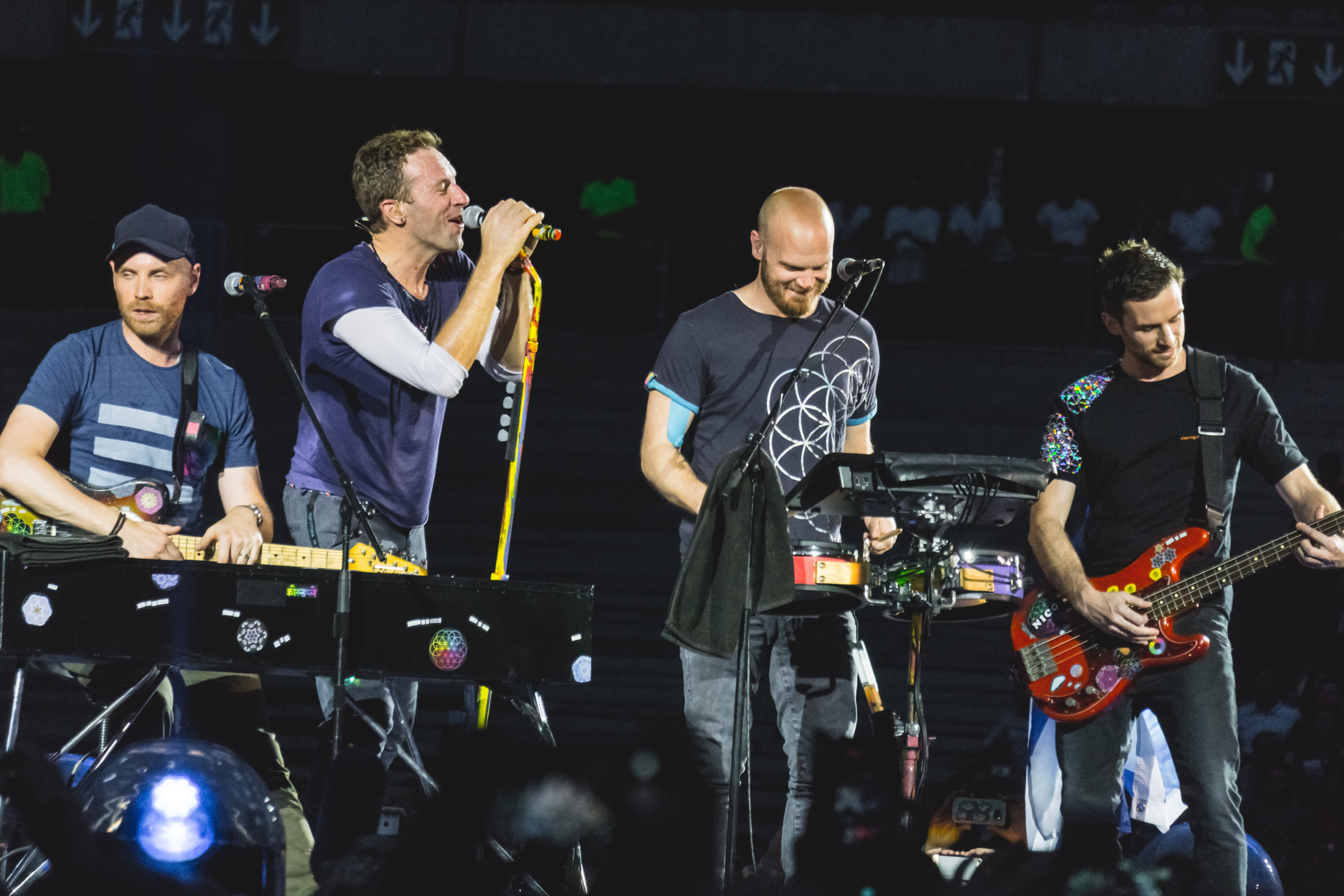
Three-time winners Coldplay

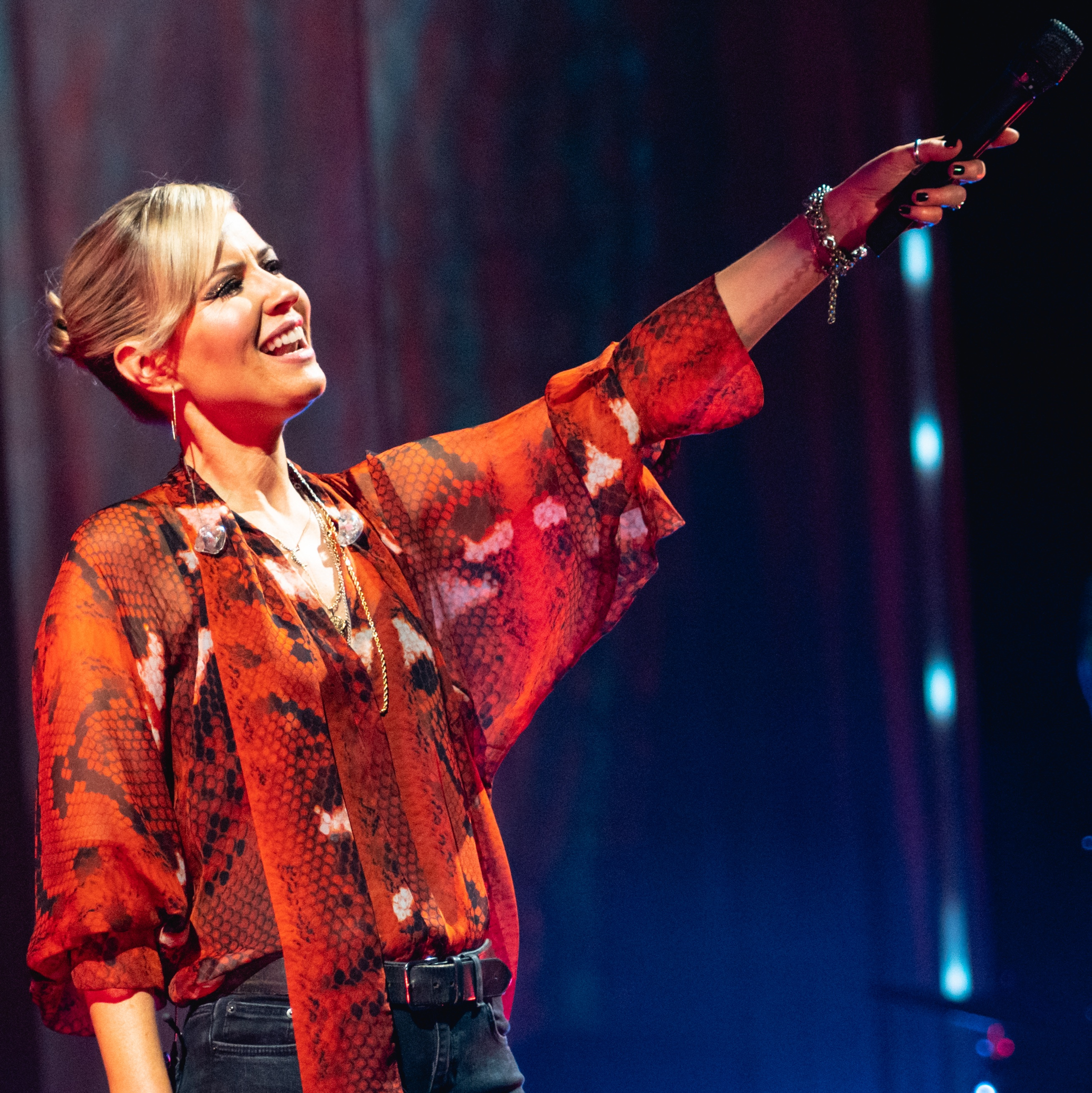
Dido received the award in 2002 for her album No Angel

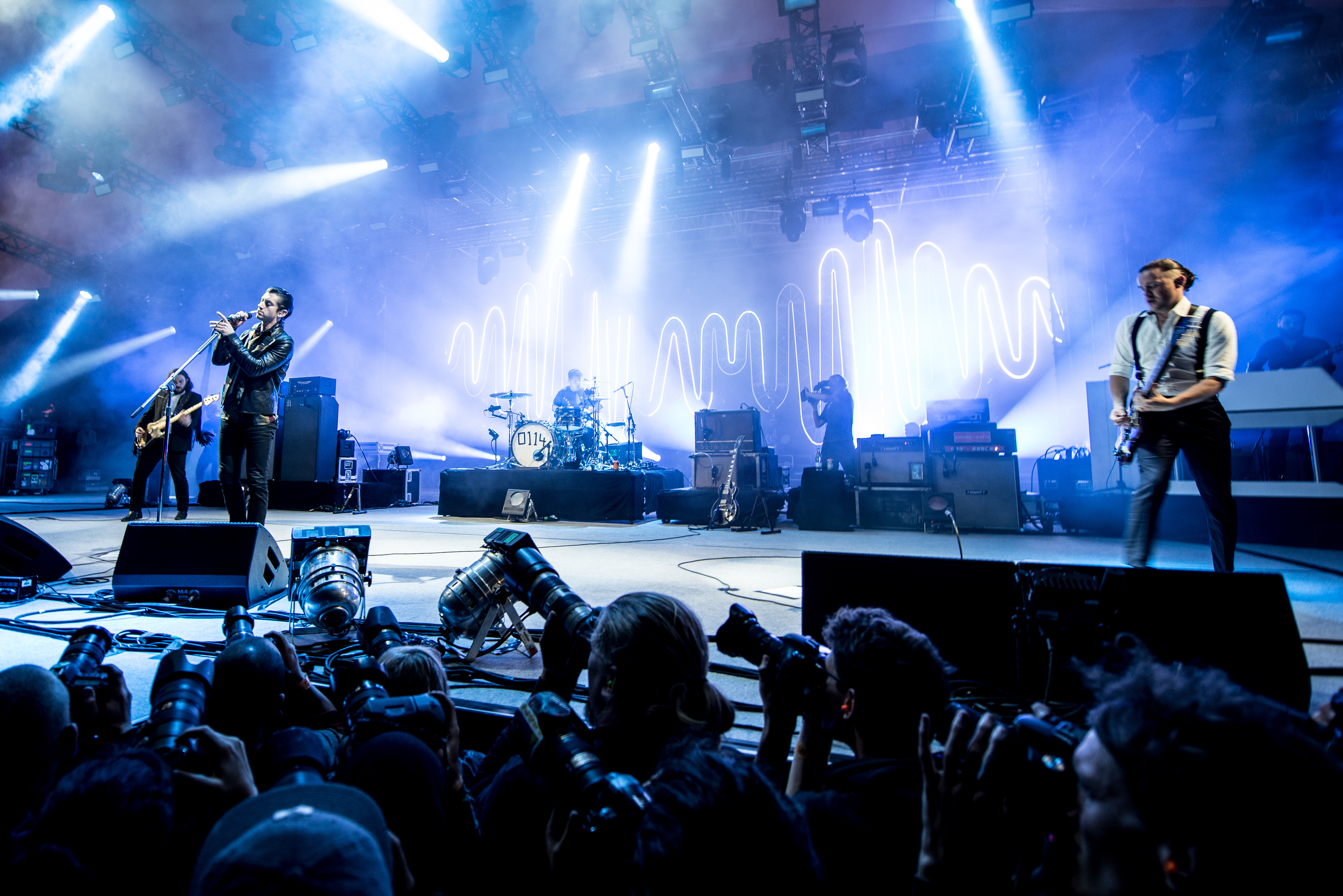
Arctic Monkeys have won the award three times

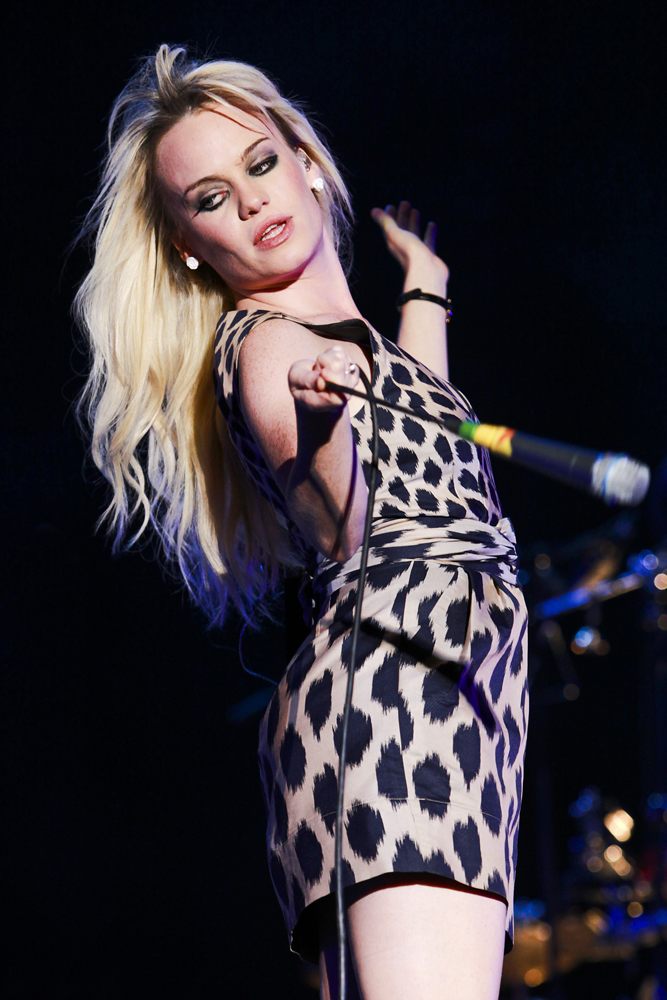
2009 recipient Duffy won for Rockferry

Year	Album	Artist(s)
2000 (20th)	The Man Who	Travis
2000 (20th)	Liquid Skin	Gomez
2000 (20th)	Performance and Cocktails	Stereophonics
2000 (20th)	Remedy	Basement Jaxx
2000 (20th)	Surrender	The Chemical Brothers
2001 (21st)	Parachutes	Coldplay
2001 (21st)	Born to Do It	Craig David
2001 (21st)	Kid A	Radiohead
2001 (21st)	Lost Songs 95–98	David Gray
2001 (21st)	Sing When You're Winning	Robbie Williams
2002 (22nd)	No Angel	Dido
2002 (22nd)	Born to Do It	Craig David
2002 (22nd)	Gorillaz	Gorillaz
2002 (22nd)	The Invisible Band	Travis
2002 (22nd)	Kid A	Radiohead
2003 (23rd)	A Rush of Blood to the Head	Coldplay
2003 (23rd)	Angels with Dirty Faces	Sugababes
2003 (23rd)	The Coral	The Coral
2003 (23rd)	A Little Deeper	Ms. Dynamite
2003 (23rd)	Original Pirate Material	The Streets
2004 (24th)	Permission to Land	The Darkness
2004 (24th)	Gotta Get thru This	Daniel Bedingfield
2004 (24th)	Life for Rent	Dido
2004 (24th)	Magic and Medicine	The Coral
2004 (24th)	Think Tank	Blur
2005 (25th)	Hopes and Fears	Keane
2005 (25th)	Absolution	Muse
2005 (25th)	Final Straw	Snow Patrol
2005 (25th)	Franz Ferdinand	Franz Ferdinand
2005 (25th)	A Grand Don't Come for Free	The Streets
2006 (26th)	X&Y	Coldplay
2006 (26th)	Aerial	Kate Bush
2006 (26th)	Back to Bedlam	James Blunt
2006 (26th)	Demon Days	Gorillaz
2006 (26th)	Employment	Kaiser Chiefs
2007 (27th)	Whatever People Say I Am, That's What I'm Not	Arctic Monkeys
2007 (27th)	Alright, Still	Lily Allen
2007 (27th)	Back to Black	Amy Winehouse
2007 (27th)	Black Holes and Revelations	Muse
2007 (27th)	Eyes Open	Snow Patrol
2008 (28th)	Favourite Worst Nightmare	Arctic Monkeys
2008 (28th)	Beautiful World	Take That
2008 (28th)	Life in Cartoon Motion	Mika
2008 (28th)	Spirit	Leona Lewis
2008 (28th)	Version	Mark Ronson
2009 (29th)	Rockferry	Duffy
2009 (29th)	In Rainbows	Radiohead
2009 (29th)	The Seldom Seen Kid	Elbow
2009 (29th)	Viva la Vida or Death and All His Friends	Coldplay
2009 (29th)	We Started Nothing	The Ting Tings

=== 2010s ===
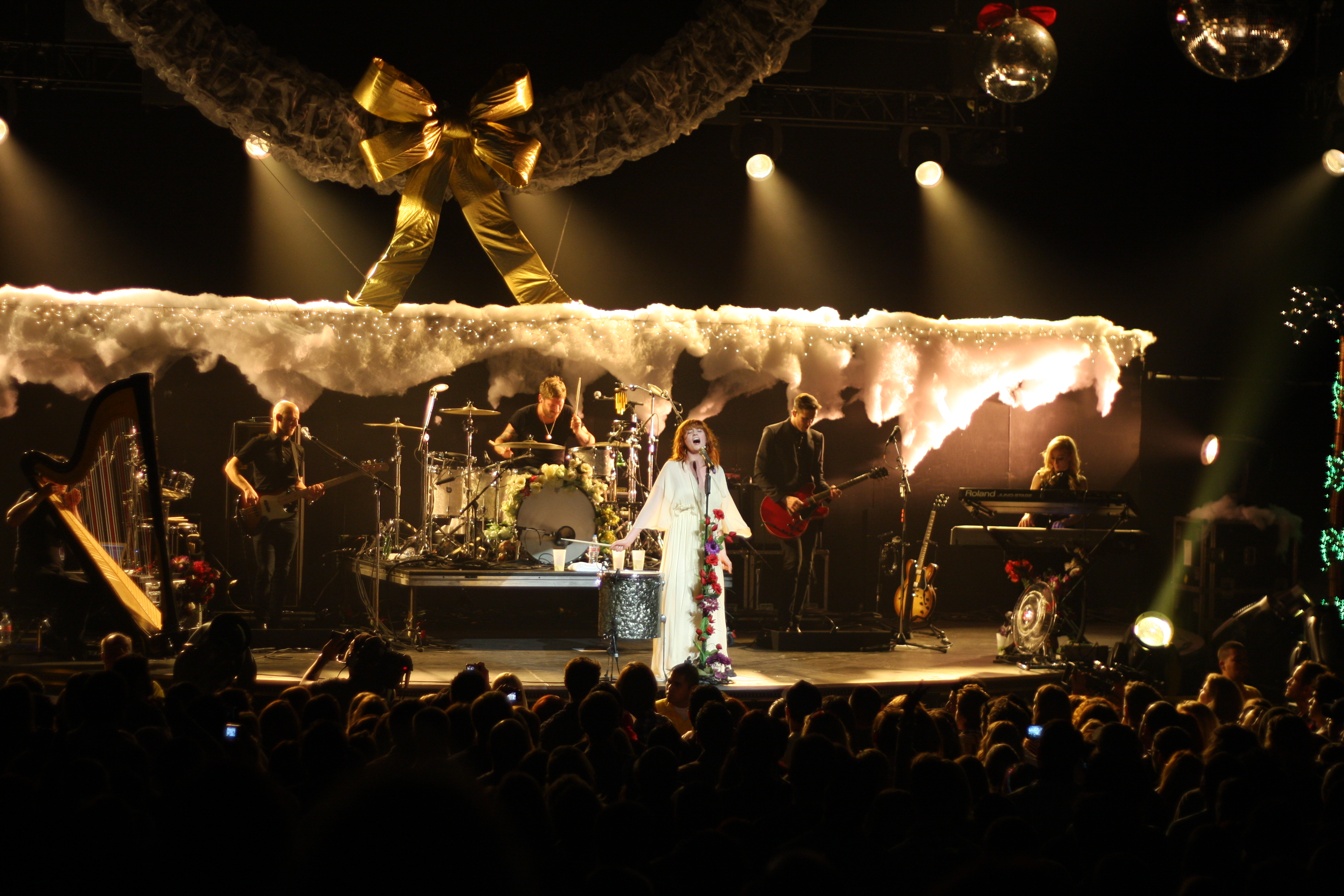
Florence + the Machine won for their debut album Lungs

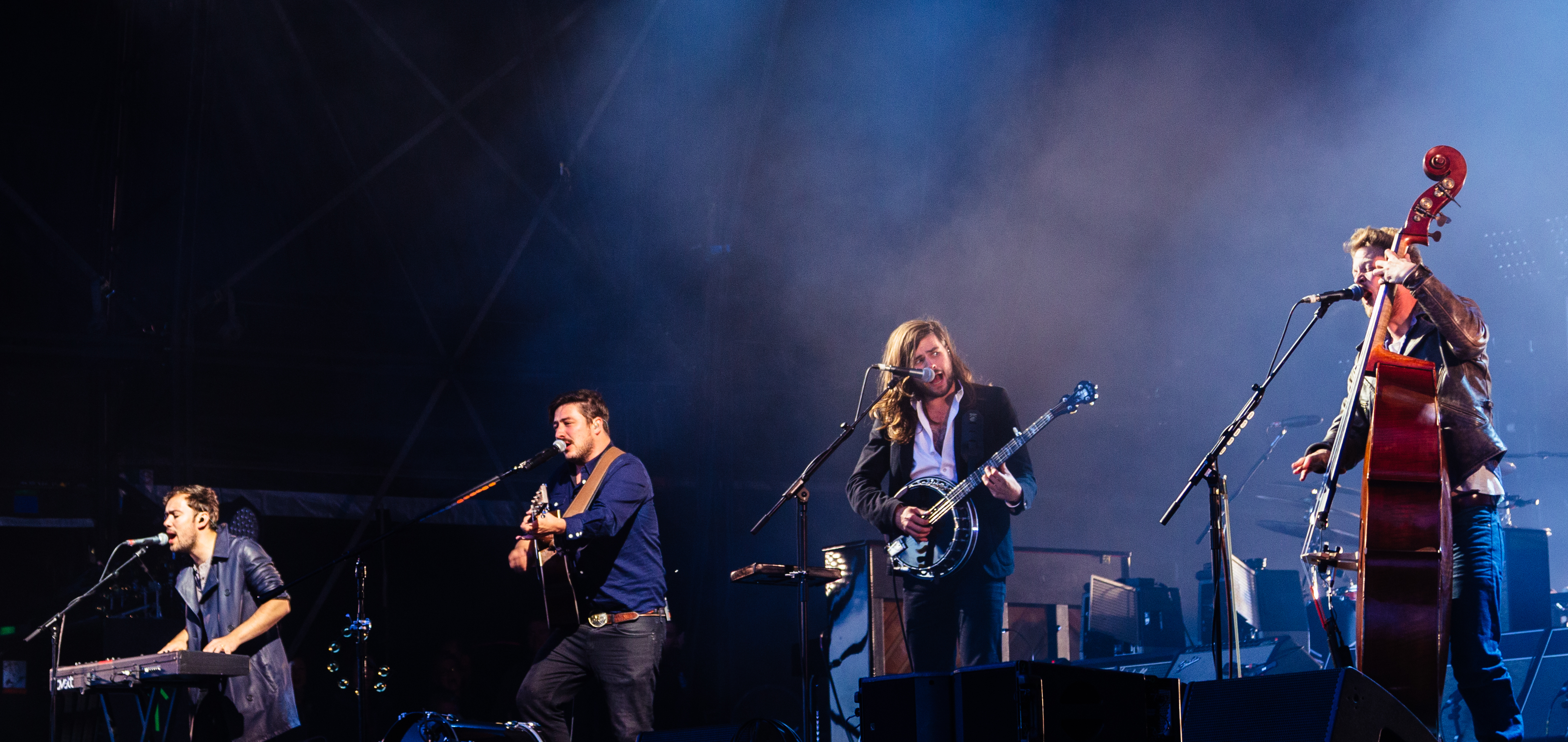
2011 recipients Mumford & Sons

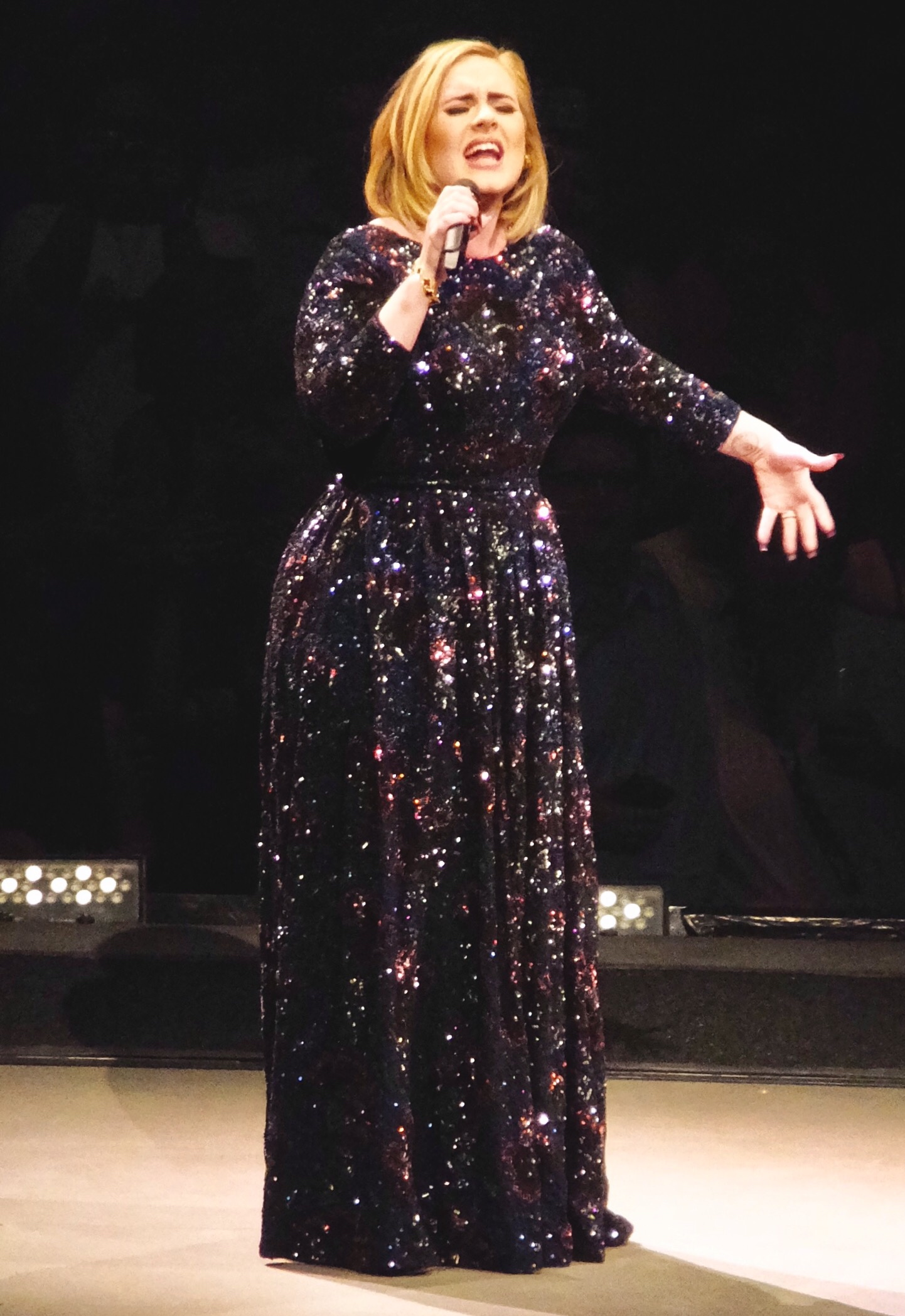
Adele is the only solo artist to have won the award more than once and is one of three three-time winners

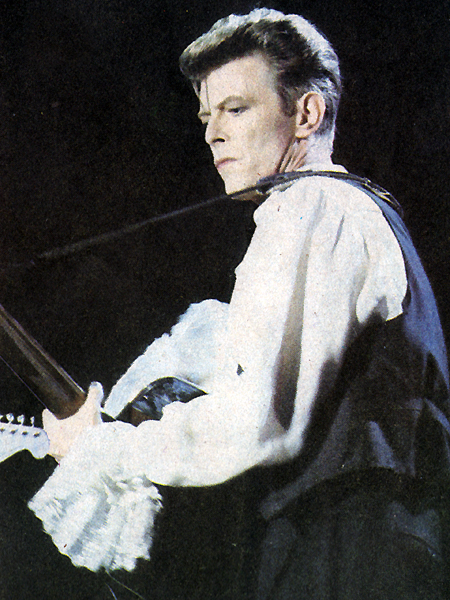
2017 recipient David Bowie won for his final album Blackstar

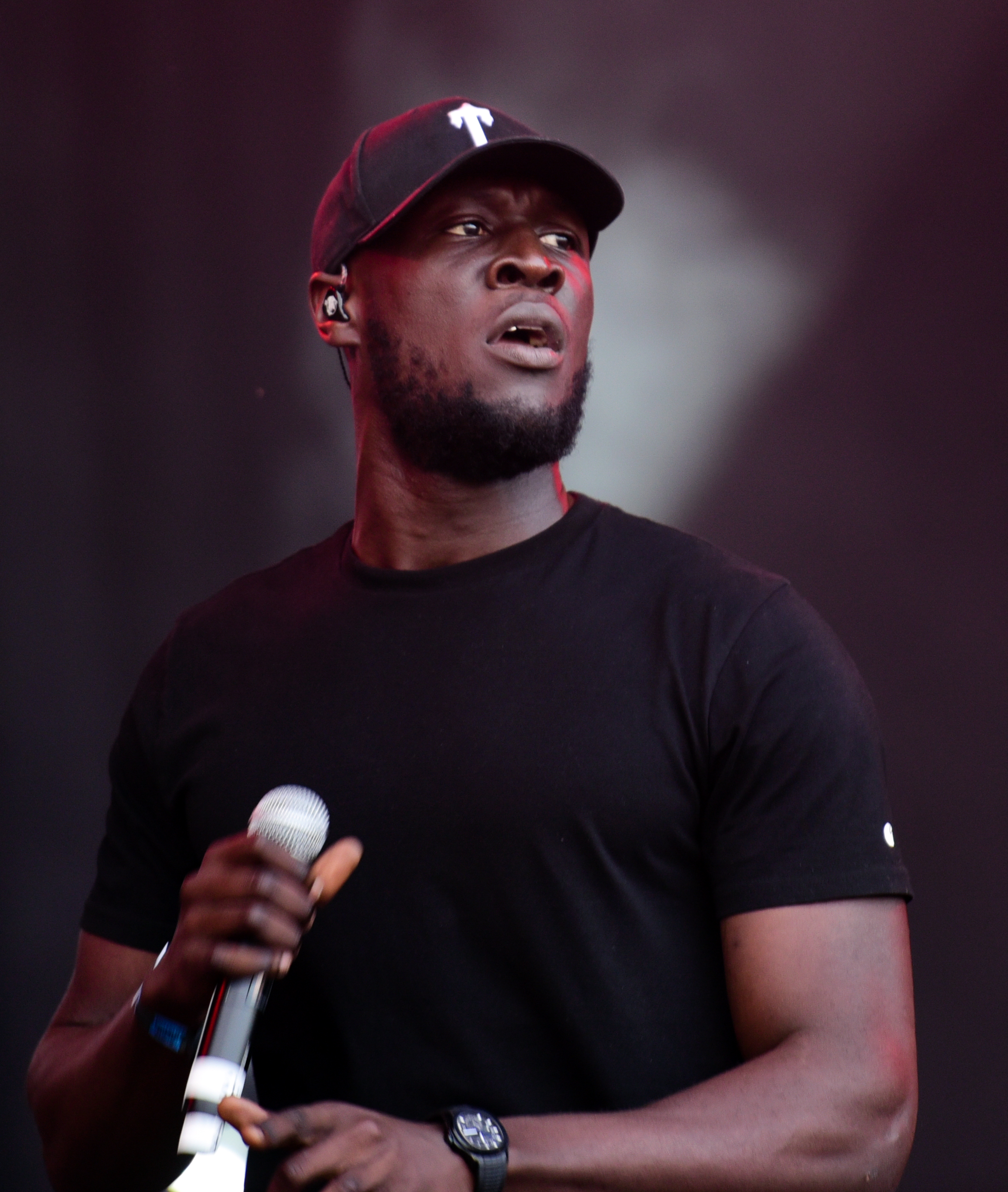
2018 winner Stormzy

Year	Album	Artist(s)
2010 (30th)
2010 (30th)	Lungs	Florence and the Machine
2010 (30th)	It's Not Me, It's You	Lily Allen
2010 (30th)	Sunny Side Up	Paolo Nutini
2010 (30th)	Tongue n' Cheek	Dizzee Rascal
2010 (30th)	West Ryder Pauper Lunatic Asylum	Kasabian
2011 (31st)
2011 (31st)	Sigh No More	Mumford & Sons
2011 (31st)	The Defamation of Strickland Banks	Plan B
2011 (31st)	Disc-Overy	Tinie Tempah
2011 (31st)	Progress	Take That
2011 (31st)	xx	The xx
2012 (32nd)
2012 (32nd)	21	Adele
2012 (32nd)	Ceremonials	Florence and the Machine
2012 (32nd)	Let England Shake	PJ Harvey
2012 (32nd)	Mylo Xyloto	Coldplay
2012 (32nd)	+	Ed Sheeran
2013 (33rd)
2013 (33rd)	Our Version of Events	Emeli Sandé
2013 (33rd)	An Awesome Wave	alt-J
2013 (33rd)	Babel	Mumford & Sons
2013 (33rd)	Fall to Grace	Paloma Faith
2013 (33rd)	Ill Manors	Plan B
2014 (34th)
2014 (34th)	AM	Arctic Monkeys
2014 (34th)	Bad Blood	Bastille
2014 (34th)	Home	Rudimental
2014 (34th)	The Next Day	David Bowie
2014 (34th)	Settle	Disclosure
2015 (35th)
2015 (35th)	x	Ed Sheeran
2015 (35th)	In the Lonely Hour	Sam Smith
2015 (35th)	Royal Blood	Royal Blood
2015 (35th)	This Is All Yours	alt-J
2015 (35th)	Wanted on Voyage	George Ezra
2016 (36th)
2016 (36th)	25	Adele
2016 (36th)	Chaos and the Calm	James Bay
2016 (36th)	A Head Full of Dreams	Coldplay
2016 (36th)	How Big, How Blue, How Beautiful	Florence and the Machine
2016 (36th)	In Colour	Jamie xx
2017 (37th)
2017 (37th)	Blackstar	David Bowie
2017 (37th)	I Like It When You Sleep, for You Are So Beautiful yet So Unaware of It	The 1975
2017 (37th)	Konnichiwa	Skepta
2017 (37th)	Love & Hate	Michael Kiwanuka
2017 (37th)	Made in the Manor	Kano
2018 (38th)
2018 (38th)	Gang Signs & Prayer	Stormzy
2018 (38th)	Common Sense	J Hus
2018 (38th)	÷	Ed Sheeran
2018 (38th)	Dua Lipa	Dua Lipa
2018 (38th)	Human	Rag'n'Bone Man
2019 (39th)
2019 (39th)	A Brief Inquiry into Online Relationships	The 1975
2019 (39th)	High as Hope	Florence and the Machine
2019 (39th)	Lost & Found	Jorja Smith
2019 (39th)	Speak Your Mind	Anne-Marie
2019 (39th)	Staying at Tamara's	George Ezra

=== 2020s ===
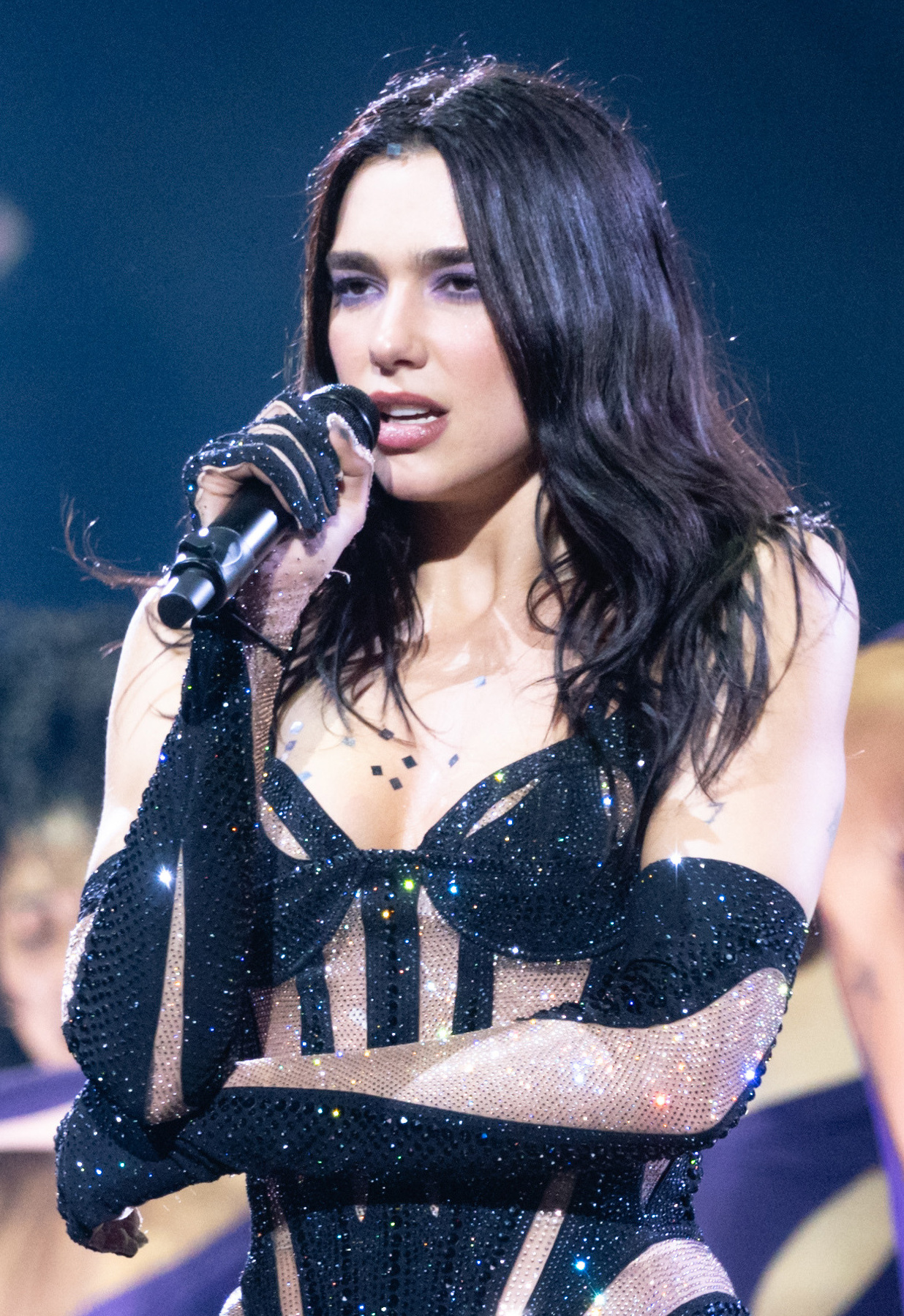
Dua Lipa won the award in 2021 for Future Nostalgia

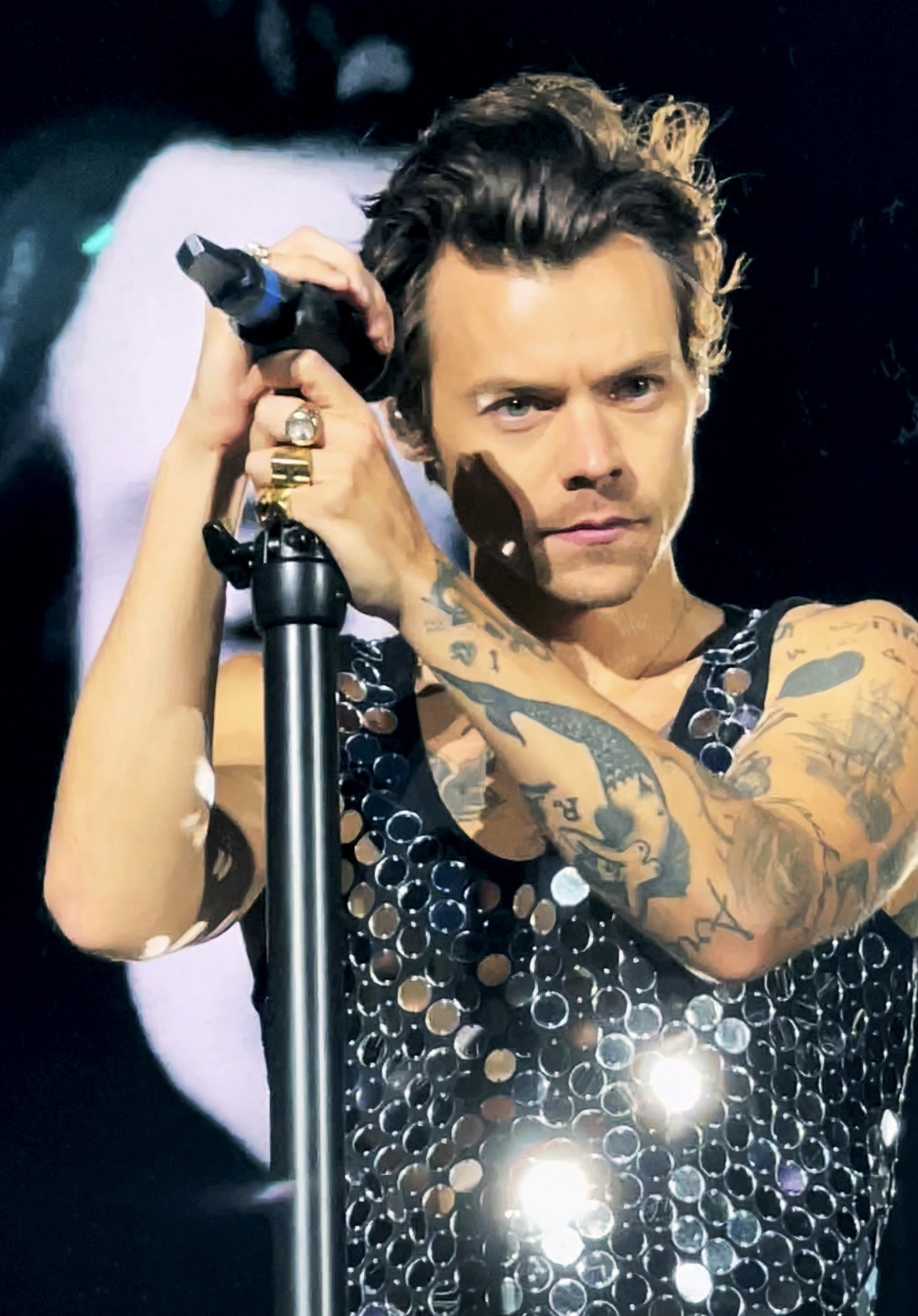
2023 winner Harry Styles.

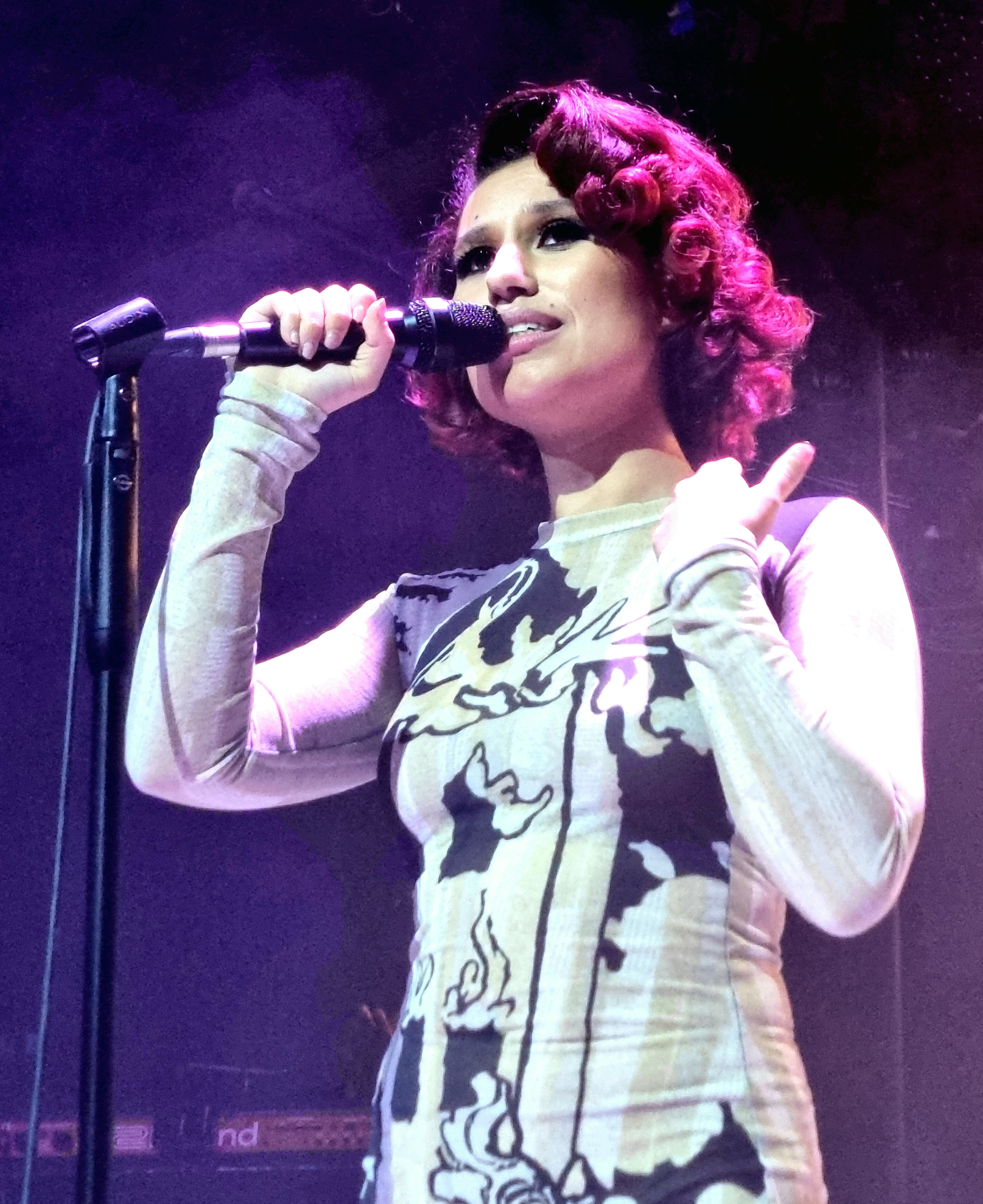
2024 recipient Raye.

Year	Album	Artist(s)
2020 (40th)
2020 (40th)	Psychodrama	Dave
2020 (40th)	Divinely Uninspired to a Hellish Extent	Lewis Capaldi
2020 (40th)	Fine Line	Harry Styles
2020 (40th)	Heavy Is the Head	Stormzy
2020 (40th)	Kiwanuka	Michael Kiwanuka
2021 (41st)
2021 (41st)	Future Nostalgia	Dua Lipa
2021 (41st)	Big Conspiracy	J Hus
2021 (41st)	Collapsed in Sunbeams	Arlo Parks
2021 (41st)	Not Your Muse	Celeste
2021 (41st)	What's Your Pleasure?	Jessie Ware
2022 (42nd)
2022 (42nd)	30	Adele
2022 (42nd)	=	Ed Sheeran
2022 (42nd)	Seventeen Going Under	Sam Fender
2022 (42nd)	Sometimes I Might Be Introvert	Little Simz
2022 (42nd)	We're All Alone in This Together	Dave
2023 (43rd)
2023 (43rd)	Harry's House	Harry Styles
2023 (43rd)	Actual Life 3 (January 1 – September 9 2022)	Fred Again
2023 (43rd)	Being Funny in a Foreign Language	The 1975
2023 (43rd)	This Is What I Mean	Stormzy
2023 (43rd)	Wet Leg	Wet Leg
2024 (44th)
2024 (44th)	My 21st Century Blues	Raye
2024 (44th)	The Ballad of Darren	Blur
2024 (44th)	Beautiful and Brutal Yard	J Hus
2024 (44th)	Heavy Heavy	Young Fathers
2024 (44th)	No Thank You	Little Simz
2025 (45th)
2025 (45th)	Brat	Charli XCX
2025 (45th)	Dance, No One's Watching	Ezra Collective
2025 (45th)	Prelude to Ecstasy	The Last Dinner Party
2025 (45th)	Radical Optimism	Dua Lipa
2025 (45th)	Songs of a Lost World	The Cure
2026 (46th)
2026 (46th)	The Art of Loving	Olivia Dean
2026 (46th)	The Boy Who Played the Harp	Dave
2026 (46th)	The Clearing	Wolf Alice
2026 (46th)	People Watching	Sam Fender
2026 (46th)	West End Girl	Lily Allen

== Artists with multiple wins ==
Artists that received multiple awards
Awards	Artist
3	Adele
3	Arctic Monkeys
3	Coldplay
2
2	Manic Street Preachers

== Artists with multiple nominations ==
6 nominations

- Coldplay
- Damon Albarn (Note: Including three as a member of Blur and two as a member of Gorillaz.)

5 nominations

- Radiohead

4 nominations

- Blur
- Florence and the Machine
- Ed Sheeran

3 nominations

- The 1975
- Adele
- Lily Allen
- Arctic Monkeys
- Dave
- Dua Lipa
- J Hus
- Elton John
- Annie Lennox (Note: Including two as a member of Eurythmics.)
- Massive Attack
- George Michael
- Oasis
- Simply Red
- Stormzy

2 nominations

- alt-J
- David Bowie
- Kate Bush
- The Coral
- Craig David
- Dido
- Dire Straits
- Eurythmics
- George Ezra
- Sam Fender
- Gomez
- Gorillaz
- Michael Kiwanuka
- Little Simz
- Manic Street Preachers
- Mumford & Sons
- Muse
- Pet Shop Boys
- Pink Floyd
- Plan B
- Queen
- Snow Patrol
- Sting
- The Streets
- Harry Styles
- Take That
- Tears for Fears
- Travis
- Robbie Williams

== Notes ==
- Brothers in Arms (1986–1987), Born to Do It (2001–2002), Kid A (2001–2002) Double Nominated
- (What's the Story) Morning Glory? (2010) also won Brit Award for British Album of Thirty Year
