= MOBO Awards 2023 =

2023 edition of award ceremony

- Date: 7 February 2024
- Location: Utilita Arena, Sheffield
- Hosted by: Indiyah Polack and Babatunde Aléshé

Highlights
- Most awards: Central Cee and Dave (2 each)
- Most nominations: Little Simz and Stormzy (4)
- Website: mobo.com

Television/radio coverage
- Network: YouTube (live coverage); BBC One (highlights)

After a fallow year in 2023, due to the organisers moving the ceremony to coincide with the early-year awards season that features the Grammys and the Brit Awards, the 26th MOBO Awards were held on 7 February 2024 at the Utilita Arena in Sheffield. The 26th annual awards recognised achievements in "Music Of Black Origin" during 1 September 2022 to 31 August 2023. The ceremony was hosted by former Love Island star Indiyah Polack and actor Babatunde Aléshé. It was live-streamed through YouTube, with highlights shown by the BBC two days later.

The nominees were announced on 14 December 2023. In addition to the two existing honorary awards, Paving the Way and Lifetime Achievement, two additional awards were announced: Mobo Impact and Mobo Pioneer. The Outstanding Contribution Award was not bestowed in this year.

== Performers ==
Headline acts consisting of Soul II Soul, Byron Messia and DJ Spoony were announced on 19 January 2024. Other acts on the night included Camidoh and King Promise. DJ Spoony curated a set celebrating 30 years of UK garage with support from many other artists and Sugababes performed a medley of their well known hits.

List of performers at the MOBO Awards 2024
Artist(s)	Song(s)
Byron Messia	"Talibans"
DJ Spoony (supported by Nay Nay, MC Creed, MC Ranking, Denzie, MC Viper, MC Maxwell D, Sabrina Washington and So Solid Crew)	"21 Seconds", "Sorry! (I Didn’t Know)", "Body Groove", "Why", "21 Seconds"
Soul II Soul	"Fairplay", "Nothing Compares 2 U", "Get a Life", "Keep On Movin'" and "Back to Life"
Sugababes	"Overload", "Push the Button", "Freak Like Me"
Ghetts	"Double Standards"
King Promise	"Terminator"
Camidoh	"Sugarcane"
Cristale	"Antisocial"

== Winners and nominees ==
The nominees were announced on 14 December 2023. The winners are listed first and in boldface.

Central Cee received two awards, including Best Male Act for the second year in a row, which gave him a grand total of six MOBOs, tying him with Stormzy as the most-awarded rapper in the MOBO awards' history.

**Album of the Year**: **Real Back in Style – Potter Payper**; Where I’m Meant To Be – Ezra Collective; Beautiful and Brutal Yard – J Hus; No Thank You – Little Simz; My 21st Century Blues – Raye; This is What I Mean – Stormzy	**Song of the Year**: **"Sprinter" – Central Cee & Dave**; "Who Told You" – J Hus featuring Drake; "Little Things" – Jorja Smith; "Boy’s a Liar Pt 2" – PinkPantheress & Ice Spice; "Escapism" – Raye & 070 Shake; "Hide & Seek" – Stormzy
**Best Male Act**: **Central Cee**; Dave; D-Block Europe; J Hus; Nines; Stormzy	**Best Female Act**: **Raye**; Flo; Jorja Smith; Little Simz; Mahalia; PinkPantheress
**Best Newcomer**: **Tunde**; Ama Lou; AntsLive; Debbie; Jayo; Nippa; No Guidnce; Rimzee; Strandz; Tamera	**Video of the Year**: **"Mel Made Me Do It" – Stormzy (dir. Klvdr)**; "Number One Candidate" – AntsLive (dir. Tom Emmerson); "No More Naija Men" – Enny (dir. Otis Dominique); "Dirt in the Diamond EP1": Mobay ft Tay Iwar/ Stay Close ft Kranium – Jords (dir. Renee Maria Osubu); "Gorilla" – Little Simz (dir. Dave Meyers); "Healing" – Tion Wayne (dir. Wowa)
**Best R&B/Soul Act**: **Sault**; Bellah; Jaz Karis; Mahalia; Ragz Originale; Sampha	**Best Grime Act**: **Bugzy Malone**; Duppy; Flowdan; Manga Saint Hilare; Novelist; P Money
**Best Hip Hop Act**: **Little Simz**; Avelino; Clavish; Digga D; Enny; Fredo; Giggs; Loyle Carner; Nines; Potter Payper	**Best Drill Act**: **K-Trap**; Central Cee; Headie One; Kwengface; M24; Russ Millions; TeeZandos; Unknown T
**Best Alternative Music Act**: **Skindred**; Alt Blk Era; Arlo Parks; Deijuvhs; Kid Bookie; Young Fathers	**Best Electronic/Dance Act**: **Shygirl**; Aluna; Nia Archives; PinkPantheress; Salute; Tsha
**Best International Act (US)**: **Drake & 21 Savage**; Doja Cat; Travis Scott; Ice Spice; Latto; Lil Uzi Vert; Nicki Minaj; Sexyy Red; SZA; Victoria Monét	**Best African Music Act**: **Asake (Nigeria)**; Adekunle Gold (Nigeria); Ayra Starr (Nigeria); Burna Boy (Nigeria); Davido (Nigeria); Libianca (Cameroon); Rema (Nigeria); Tyla (South Africa); Uncle Waffles (Eswatini); Wizkid (Nigeria)
**Best Gospel Act**: **Limoblaze**; Annatoria; CalledOut Music; Guvna B; Tofunmi Adorna; Triple O	**Best Jazz Act**: **Ezra Collective**; Blue Lab Beats; Cktrl; Masego; Reuben James; Yazmin Lacey
**Best Caribbean Music Act**: **Valiant**; Byron Messia (Jamaica); Destra (Trinidad); Kabaka Pyramid (Jamaica); Popcaan (Jamaica); Shenseea (Jamaica)	**Best Producer**: **Info**; Kyle Evans; M1onTheBeat; P2J; Steel Banglez; TSB
**Best Performance in a TV Show/Film**: **Damson Idris – Snowfall**; Adjani Salmon – Dreaming Whilst Black; Deja J Bowens – Champion; Idris Elba – Hijack; India Amarteifio – Queen Charlotte: A Bridgerton Story; John Boyega – They Cloned Tyrone; Lashana Lynch – The Woman King	**Best Media Personality**: **ShxtsnGigs** (James Duncan and Fuhad Dawodu); Alison Hammond; Amelia Dimoldenberg; Henrie Kwushue; Madame Joyce; Maya Jama; Pressed podcast; Remi Burgz; Specs Gonzalez; Zeze Millz

=== Special awards ===
Lifetime Achievement Award

- Soul II Soul

Paving The Way Award

- Jessica Ennis-Hill

MOBO Impact Award

- Sugababes

MOBO Pioneer Award

- Ghetts
