= Jae5 =

British-Ghanaian record producer and mixing engineer

- Born: Jonathan Kweku Awote-Mensah; 22 July 1992 (age 33); Plaistow, Newham, England
- Relatives: Kruddz (brother); OGD (brother)
- Musical career
- Genres: Afroswing; afrobeats; dancehall
- Occupations: Record producer; mixing engineer
- Years active: 2015–present
- Label: Black Butter Records

Jonathan Kweku Awote-Mensah (born 27 March 1992), known professionally as Jae5, is a British-Ghanaian record producer and mixing engineer from Plaistow, East London. He is a Grammy Award-winning producer and is signed to Black Butter Records.

== Early life ==
Jonathan Mensah grew up in London as a child and moved to Ghana from age 9 to age 12 with his brothers. He is the older brother of NSG members Kruddz and OGD. When he moved back to London, he did courses at the program APE Media, where he developed production and engineering skills. His older brother also had a DJ program where he learned how to use Fruity Loops and other software tools.

== Career ==
Jae5 was part of a production company called JOAT Music Group, started by his uncle Blemish and artist Randy Valentine. He began working with J Hus with JOAT in 2015 and produced the mixtape The 15th Day to widespread acclaim. He later began producing for other British artists such as MoStack and Dave. In 2017, he executive produced the album Common Sense by J Hus, spawning the successful single "Did You See". Following that success, he worked with Burna Boy on the songs "Sekkle Down" and "Calm Down". Also in 2018, he worked with Geko, Shakka, Mr Eazi, Rudimental, and Young T & Bugsey, as well as producing NSG's most successful single "Options". In 2019, he produced the multi platinum single "Location" and "Disaster" by Dave. His producing credits earned him accolades such as the GRM Rated Awards and MOBO Awards for Best Producer.

In 2021, Jae5 released his debut single as a lead artist called "Dimension" featuring Skepta and Rema.

== Artistry ==
Jae5 was credited by many publications as a producer for pioneering the fusion genre of afroswing. His sound is described as a fusion between grime, afrobeats, bashment, and dancehall.

== Discography ==
=== Singles ===
==== As lead artist ====
Title	Year	Peak chart positions			Certifications	Album
Title	Year	UK	IRE	NZ Hot	Certifications	Album
"Dimension" (featuring Skepta and Rema)	2021	58	—	—		TBA
"Propeller" (featuring Dave and BNXN fka Buju)	2022	38	59	28	BPI: Silver	TBA

==== As featured artist ====
Title	Year	Peak chart positions	Album
Title	Year	UK	Album
"Who's True" (Tion Wayne featuring Davido & Jae5)	2021	50	Green With Envy
"Back In Uni" (Blaqbonez & Jae5)	2022	–	Young Preacher
"Devil's Enemy" (Zakhar & Jae5)	2022	–	—N/a

== Production discography ==
=== 2015 ===
J Hus – The 15th Day

- 01. "I'm Coming" (produced with JOAT Music Group)
- 02. "Shawty Inda Bando" (featuring Baseman) (produced with JOAT Music Group)
- 03. "Bangers & Mash" (featuring Deepee) (produced with JOAT Music Group)
- 04. "Warm It Up" (produced with JOAT Music Group)
- 05. "No Way" (produced with N2theA)
- 06. "Dubai" (featuring Locz) (produced with JOAT Music Group)
- 07. "Drive Me" (featuring Fekky) (produced with JOAT Music Group)
- 08. "Forget a Hater" (featuring NSG) (produced with JOAT Music Group)
- 09. "No Lie" (produced with JOAT Music Group)
- 11. "Guns and Butter" (produced with JOAT Music Group)
- 12. "Calling Me" (produced with JOAT Music Group)
- 14. "How It Goes" (featuring Randy Valentine) (produced with JOAT Music Group)

Mostack – So Paranoid – Single

- 00. "So Paranoid"

=== 2016 ===
J Hus – Playing Sports

- 01. "Playing Sports"
- 02. "Clean It Up"
- 03. "Free Up"

=== 2017 ===
Dave & J Hus – Samantha – Single

- 00. "Samantha"

J Hus – Common Sense

- 01. "Common Sense" (produced with The Compozers)
- 02. "Bouff Daddy"
- 03. "Clartin"
- 04. "Leave Me" (produced with IO)
- 05. "Closed Doors"
- 06. "Did You See"
- 07. "Like Your Style"
- 08. "Plottin"
- 09. "Sweet Cheeks" (produced with IO)
- 10. "Fisherman" (featuring MoStack & MIST) (produced with Steel Banglez)
- 11. "Good Time" (featuring Burna Boy)
- 12. "Spirit" (produced with TSB & IO)
- 13. "Mash Up" (featuring MoStack)
- 14. "Goodies"
- 15. "Good Luck Chale" (featuring Tiggs Da Author) (produced with Show N Prove)
- 16. "Who You Are"
- 17. "Friendly"

NSG – Yo Darlin' – Single

- 00. "Yo Darlin'"

French Montana – Unforgettable (J Hus Remix) – Single

- 00. "Unforgettable (J Hus Remix)" (featuring J Hus & Swae Lee)

=== 2018 ===
Burna Boy – Outside

- 04. "Sekkle Down" (featuring J Hus)
- 12. "Calm Down"

J Hus – Big Spang

- 01. "Dark Vader"
- 02. "Scene"
- 03. "Dancing Man"

Geko – 6:30 – Single

- 00. "6:30" (featuring NSG)

NSG – Natural Disaster – Single

- 00. "Natural Disaster"

Shakka – Tribe Tuesday – Season 2

- 02. "Long Ting"

Jess Glynne – Always in Between

- 06. "123"

Rudimental – Toast to Our Differences

- 04. "Walk Alone"

Mr Eazi – Life Is Eazi, Vol. 2 – Lagos to London

- 13. "Yard & Chill"

Young T & Bugsey – Living Gravy – Single

- 00. "Living Gravy"

=== 2019 ===
Dave – Psychodrama

- 05. "Location" (featuring Burna Boy)
- 06. "Disaster" (featuring J Hus) (vocal engineer)

Mark Ronson – Late Night Feelings

- 06. "Don't Leave Me Lonely" (featuring Yebba) (produced with Picard Brothers, Mark Ronson, P2J, Tom Elmhirst & Brandon Bost) (also programmer)

Ransom FA – Be Somebody – Single

- 00. "Be Somebody"

=== 2020 ===
J Hus – Big Conspiracy

- 04. "Triumph"
- 05. "Play Play" (featuring Burna Boy) (produced with Nana Rogues & Scribz Riley)
- 06. "Cucumber" (produced with IO & Nana Rogues)
- 07. "Repeat" (featuring Koffee)
- 08. "Fortune Teller" (produced with IO, Levi Lennox & Maestro)
- 11. "Must Be"
- 12. "One and Only" (featuring Ella Mai)
- 13. "Love, Peace and Prosperity"
- 14. "Deeper Than Rap" (produced with IO)

Dyo – Dyologue

- 01. "Real"

NSG – ROOTS

- 04. "Nonsense" (featuring Chip)
- 07. "Zantoni"
- 14. "Ourself"
- 18. "Options" (featuring Tion Wayne)

Burna Boy – Twice as Tall

- 15. "Bank On It"

Young T & Bugsey – Plead the 5th

- 03. "Madonna"
- 04. "Don't Rush" (featuring Headie One) (recording engineer)

=== 2021 ===
Octavian – ALPHA

- 05. "Famous" (featuring Gunna & Saint Jhn)

JAE5 - Dimension – Single

- 00. "Dimension" (featuring Skepta & Rema)

Dave – We're All Alone in This Together

- 06. "System" (featuring Wizkid) (produced with Kyle Evans, P2J & Joe Reeves)
- 07. "Lazarus" (featuring Boj) (produced with P2J & Joe Reeves)
- 08. "Law of Attraction" (featuring Snoh Aalegra)

Skepta – All In

- 03. "Nirvana" (with J Balvin)
- 04. "Lit Like This"

Not3s – 3 Th3 Album

- 03. "3rd Eye"

Headie One – Too Loyal for my Own Good

- 07. "Finer Things"

NSG – Petite – Single

- 00. "Petite"

NSG – Headliner

- 02. "Suzanna" (featuring Patoranking)

=== 2022 ===
Koffee – Gifted

- 03. "Shine"
- 09. "Pull Up"

King Promise – 5 Star

- 08. "Ginger"

M Huncho – Chasing Euphoria

- 08. "Pray 2 The East" (featuring BNXN fka Buju) (produced with Emmanuel Asamoah & Nana Pokes)

Burna Boy - Love, Damini

- 09. "It's Plenty" (produced with ElementZ)

JAE5 - Propeller – Single

- 00. "Propeller" (featuring Dave & Bnxn)

Zakhar - Scars On My Mind

- 09. "Tough Love"

D-Block Europe - Lap 5

- 03. "She's Not Anyone"

Black Sherif - The Villain I Never Was

- 03. "45"

Blaqbonez - Young Preacher

- 04. "FashionNova"
- 05. "Back in Uni"

Zakhar & JAE5 - Devil's Enemy - Single

- 09. "Devil's Enemy"

BNXN fka Buju - Omo Elewa - Single

- 00. "Omo Elewa"

=== 2023 ===
Libianca - People - Single

- 00. "People (Remix)" (featuring Ayra Starr & Omah Lay)

=== 2024 ===
Unknown T - Blood Diamond

- 03. "WELCOME 2 MY STRIP" (featuring Odumodublvck)

=== 2026 ===
Aya Nakamura - Destinée Supremacy

- 19. "La tipère"
- 22. "Dans la peau"

== Awards and nominations ==
Year	Event	Prize	Recipient	Result	Ref
2020	Rated Awards	Best Producer	Himself	Won	
2020	MOBO Awards	Producer of the Year	Himself	Won	
2021	Grammy Awards	Best Global Music Album	Twice as Tall	Won	
2021	MOBO Awards	Best Producer	Himself	Won	
2023	A&R Awards	Producer Of The Year	Himself	Nominated	
