= J Hus =

British rapper (born 1996)

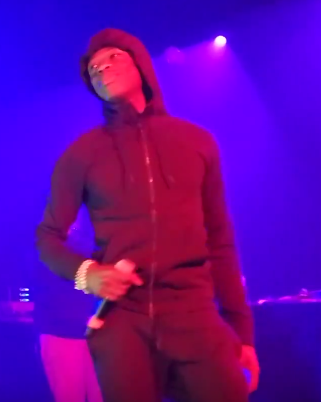
- J Hus in 2018

Background information
- Born: Mamadou Lamin Jallow; 26 May 1996 (age 30); London, England
- Origin: Stratford, London, England
- Genres: British hip-hop; Afroswing; road rap
- Occupations: Rapper; singer; songwriter
- Works: J Hus discography
- Years active: 2014–present
- Labels: Militér Music; Empire (current); Black Butter (former)
- Website: jhusmusic.com

Mamadou Lamin Jallow (born 26 May 1996) known professionally as J Hus, is a British rapper and singer, credited with pioneering the genre of Afroswing. He is currently signed to Black Butter Records. He gained popularity in 2015 following the release of his song "Dem Boy Paigon".

J Hus' "Did You See" became his most successful single at the time, peaking at number nine on the UK Singles Chart and eventually being certified Platinum. In 2017, he released his debut album, Common Sense, which was critically acclaimed—it was named the best UK album of 2017 by Complex.

In January 2020, J Hus released his second album, Big Conspiracy, which featured appearances by Jamaican singer Koffee, Nigerian singer Burna Boy and British singer Ella Mai. The album became his first number-one on the UK Albums Chart and received widespread critical acclaim. In June 2023, he released the single "Who Told You" with Drake, which became his highest-charting single, reaching number two on the UK Singles Chart. It was the lead single to his third album Beautiful and Brutal Yard, which released in July. The album became his second number-one on the UK Albums Chart.

== Early life ==
J Hus was born in London to Gambian parents and grew up in the city's Stratford district. He was raised by his mother, who immigrated to England when she was 25 years old. Jallow was raised Muslim and is of ethnic Fula and Serer heritage. As a child, he and his mother would go to African parties and his parents would play African music for him. Growing up, he wanted to become an actor. He was expelled from school as he had, in his words, "started getting into a bit of trouble." In September 2014, following two separate prison stints, he was advised to focus on pursuing a music career by his childhood friend Moe who also agreed to be his manager. Moe and his older brother would go on to form their own management company, 2K Management.

J Hus got his stage name from the word "hustler", explaining that he would buy a pack of doughnuts and sell them individually at a profit when he was in secondary school.

== Career ==
=== 2014–2016: Career beginnings and The 15th Day ===
J Hus began his career by recording several freestyles, including #StreetHeat, Bl@CKBOX and GRM Daily and publishing them online. He followed this with "#Rated", which samples the beat from French Montana's "Don't Panic", and "Want From Me" Remix of Kojo Funds' song, which gained a lot of coverage, helping his breakthrough. His next release was "Dem Boy Paigon", which was described by Ajay Rose of The Link Up as having "brought together an Afro-beat sound with lyrical rap ... capable of turning any dance upside down." He followed this with "No Lie" and his SB: TV "Warm Up Session".

Around the end of March 2015, he and MoStack released their "Westwood Crib Session". In late May 2015, he released "Lean & Bop", which was streamed more than 10 million times in total on music platforms. Around this time, he also released a "Daily Duppy" for GRM Daily, which he followed with his first mixtape, The 15th Day.

=== 2016-2019: Common Sense and Big Spang ===
Jallow released the single "Friendly" in 2016, which received a nomination at the 2016 MOBO Awards, as well as "Playing Sports", MoStack's "Liar Liar" (Remix) and "Solo One", the last of which appeared on the Brotherhood soundtrack.

In 2017, he featured on Nines' "High Roller", which featured on his album One Foot Out. He also featured on Stormzy's "Bad Boys" from his album Gang Signs & Prayer, which peaked at number 22 on the UK Singles Chart, on Dave's "Samantha", which peaked at number 63, and charted at number 9 with his solo composition "Did You See". The song served as the lead single off his debut album, Common Sense (2017). Upon release, the album was positively received by fans and includes features from MoStack, MIST, Tiggs da Author and Burna Boy. In May 2018, he released his EP, Big Spang (2018).

Following his June 2018 arrest for carrying a bladed article in public, Jallow was sentenced to eight months in jail in December. Jallow's label stopped releasing music, with his only verse whilst incarcerated coming from the song "Disaster" which was released on Dave's debut album, Psychodrama. "Disaster" debuted at number eight on the UK Singles Chart on 15 March 2019.

=== 2019–present: Big Conspiracy and Beautiful and Brutal Yard ===
Hours after his release from prison in April 2019, he made a surprise appearance on stage at Drake's concert at the O2 Arena in London. In November he released the single "Must Be". He then released the singles "No Denying" and "Repeat". In December 2019, J Hus announced he will no longer tour for "the next 3/4 years, maybe more". He also stated that following his next album, he would have no more features but that he wanted to work with Burna Boy and 21 Savage. J Hus' second album Big Conspiracy was released in January 2020, and became his first number-one album.

In July 2022, he was featured on Burna Boy's song "Cloak & Dagger" off his album Love, Damini. In May 2023, he released his first song as a lead artist since 2020 with "It's Crazy". He followed this up in June with the single "Who Told You" with Drake, which peaked at number two on the UK Singles Chart. On 29 June, he announced his third album Beautiful and Brutal Yard and its release date of 14 July with a trailer narrated by Idris Elba. A day before the album's release, he released the single "Militerian" with Naira Marley. Beautiful and Brutal Yard debuted at number-one on the UK Albums Chart, becoming his second chart-topper.

On 26 June 2025, it was announced that Jallow had officially left Black Butter Records to found his own label, Militér Music, in a partnership with independent record label and music distributor, Empire. In July 2025, J Hus featured as a surprise guest at Wireless Festival alongside Drake. On 29 July, it was announced that Jallow signed a global publishing deal with Concord Music Publishing for all of his future releases and copyrights worldwide. On 12 December 2025, he released Half Clip, a three song EP featuring guest apperences from Skepta and Seyi Vibez.

== Personal life ==
He is a supporter of Arsenal F.C.

== Legal issues ==
In 2011, J Hus was arrested outside Westfield following a "mass attack" on four people, which ended in one of them being stabbed. He had already received a referral order that year after being caught with a knife in public.

In 2014 and 2015, he was arrested and served stints in His Majesty's Feltham Prison. He accrued six convictions for ten offences between 2011 and 2016, including one for carrying a knife and for violent disorder. He has also been given an ASBO.

In September 2015, the musician was admitted to hospital after being stabbed five times in London. Whilst in hospital, he was criticised for posting on Instagram a photo of him making a gang sign from his hospital bed with the message "5 stab wounds could never stop me #AntiCh #F***DaOvaSide". The attack left him with mild PTSD, for which at the time of his 2018 imprisonment he was seeing a therapist.

In June 2018, he was arrested in Stratford and charged with carrying a knife in public. He was subsequently dropped from the performance line-ups of the TRNSMT and Wireless festivals. Jallow appeared at Thames Magistrates' Court on 22 June and was released on bail. On 20 July, he pleaded not guilty, but changed his plea in October and in December was sentenced to eight months in jail. When asked why he had been carrying a six-inch (150 mm) blade, J Hus said: "You know, it's Westfield."

He was eventually released on 5 April 2019 and was welcomed back by Drake, joining him on stage at the O2 Arena during Drake's UK Assassination Vacation Tour.

== Discography ==
Studio Albums

- Common Sense (2017)
- Big Conspiracy (2020)
- Beautiful and Brutal Yard (2023)

EPs

- Playing Sports (2016)
- Big Spang (2018)
- Half Clip (2025)

== Awards and nominations ==
Award nominations for J Hus
Award	Year (Note: Indicates the year of ceremony. Each year is linked to the article about the awards held that year, wherever possible.)	Recipient(s) and nominee(s)	Category	Result	Ref.
Berlin Music Video Awards	2025	"Cream ft CB"	Best Animation	Nominated	
BET Hip Hop Awards	2023	Himself	Best International Flow	Nominated	
Brit Awards	2018	Common Sense	Album of the Year	Nominated	
Brit Awards	2018	"Did You See"	Single of the Year	Nominated	
Brit Awards	2018	Himself	Breakthrough Act	Nominated	
Brit Awards	2021	Big Conspiracy	Album of the Year	Nominated	
Brit Awards	2021	Himself	British Male Solo Artist	Won	
Brit Awards	2024	Beautiful and Brutal Yard	Album of the Year	Nominated	
Brit Awards	2024	"Who Told You" (with Drake)	Song of the Year	Nominated	
Brit Awards	2024	Himself	Artist of the Year	Nominated	
Brit Awards	2024	Himself	Best Hip Hop/Grime/Rap Act	Nominated	
Ivor Novello Awards	2020	"Must Be"	Best Contemporary Song	Nominated	
Mercury Prize	2017	Common Sense	Best Album	Nominated	
MOBO Awards	2017	"Did You See"	Best Song	Won	
MOBO Awards	2023	Beautiful and Brutal Yard	Album of the Year	Nominated	
MOBO Awards	2023	"Who Told You" (with Drake)	Song of the Year	Nominated	
MOBO Awards	2023	Himself	Best Male Act	Nominated	
UK Music Video Awards	2017	"Common Sense (Four To The Floor, Channel4)"	Best Live Session	Nominated	
UK Music Video Awards	2023	"It's Crazy"	Best Hip Hop/Grime/Rap Video	Nominated	
UK Music Video Awards	2024	"Cream"	Best Hip Hop/Grime/Rap Video	Nominated	
NME Awards	2018	Common Sense	Best Album	Won	
