= Did You See (song) =

Single by J Hus

from the album Common Sense
- Released: 2 March 2017
- Recorded: 2016
- Length: 3:01
- Label: Black Butter
- Songwriters: Momodou Jallow; Jonathan Mensah
- Producer: Jae5

J Hus singles chronology
"Samantha" (2017)	"Did You See" (2017)	"Common Sense" (2017)

"Did You See" is a 2017 song by English rapper J Hus from his debut album Common Sense. It was the first top ten single for J Hus in the United Kingdom and has been certified platinum by the British Phonographic Industry. An official music video was released to J Hus' Vevo page on YouTube on 2 March 2017.

As of July 2025, the single has moved 2,203,855 units in the United Kingdom, respectively.

== Charts ==
=== Weekly charts ===
Chart (2017)	Peak position
Ireland (IRMA)	63
UK Singles (OCC)	9
UK Hip Hop/R&B (OCC)	4

=== Year-end charts ===
Chart (2017)	Position
UK Singles (OCC)	21

== Certifications ==
Region	Certification	Certified units/sales
Denmark (IFPI Danmark)	Gold	45,000^{‡}
New Zealand (RMNZ)	Gold	15,000^{‡}
United Kingdom (BPI)	4× Platinum	2,400,000^{‡}
^{‡} Sales+streaming figures based on certification alone.
