= Big Conspiracy =

2020 studio album by J Hus

Studio album by J Hus
- Released: 24 January 2020
- Recorded: 2017–2019
- Genre: Afroswing
- Length: 44:05
- Label: Black Butter
- Producers: Jae5; IO; Levi Lennox; Maestro; Nana Rogues; Scribz Riley; Sunny Kale; TSB

J Hus chronology
Common Sense (2017)	Big Conspiracy (2020)	Beautiful and Brutal Yard (2023)

Singles from Big Conspiracy
- 1. "Must Be" Released: 10 November 2019; 2. "No Denying" Released: 27 December 2019; 3. "Repeat" Released: 23 January 2020; 4. "Play Play" Released: 23 January 2020

Big Conspiracy is the second studio album by British rapper J Hus. It was released on 24 January 2020 by Black Butter Records/Sony Music UK for streaming and digital download. The album features production from frequent collaborator Jae5, alongside IO, TSB and Nana Rogues, plus guest appearances from Iceè TGM, Koffee, Burna Boy and Ella Mai. It follows the 2017 debut album, Common Sense, and the 2018 EP Big Spang.

Two singles were released to promote the album: "Must Be" and "No Denying", both charting in the top 40 of the UK Singles Chart. The album debuted atop the UK Albums Chart, becoming J Hus' first UK number-one album. It also charted in Belgium, Canada, the Netherlands, Ireland, Norway and Sweden. Big Conspiracy received widespread acclaim from critics and was nominated for the Brit Award for British Album of the Year in 2021.

== Background ==
The album was officially announced by J Hus the day before release via social media, following several tracks being leaked online earlier in the week.

== Critical reception ==
Professional ratings
Aggregate scores
Source	Rating
AnyDecentMusic?	8.1/10
Metacritic	86/100
Review scores
Source	Rating
AllMusic	4/5 stars
Financial Times	4/5 stars
The Guardian	4/5 stars
The Independent	4/5 stars
The Line of Best Fit	9/10
NME	5/5 stars
The Observer	4/5 stars
Pitchfork	8.0/10
Q	4/5 stars
The Times	4/5 stars

Big Conspiracy received widespread acclaim from critics. On Metacritic, which assigns a normalised rating out of 100 to reviews from mainstream publications, Big Conspiracy received a weighted average score of 86, based on ten reviews, indicating "universal acclaim".

Granting a perfect score, Dhruva Balram of NME praised the "excellent, career-defining production" and J Hus' "range and gift for incorporating multiple genres within one album", concluding it is a "career-defining collection". For The Line of Best Fit, William Rosebury wrote that Big Conspiracy "certifies J Hus as one of the most influential artists in UK music. With the expansion and growth of UK music over the past decade, many people have attempted to define what exactly UK rap or ‘underground’ music is. The truth is that it's completely undefinable – it's grime, afrobeat, soul, drill, dancehall, hip-hop, R&B, garage, jungle – it's all of them, and none of them. J Hus embodies this melting pot of sounds, and with Big Conspiracy he delivers an album that once again blazes a trail for everyone else to follow."

== Track listing ==
Big Conspiracy track listing
No.	Title	Writer(s)	Producer(s)	Length
1.	"Big Conspiracy" (featuring iceè tgm)	Momodou Jallow; TSB	TSB	3:39
2.	"Helicopter" (featuring iceè tgm)	Jallow; TSB	TSB	2:34
3.	"Fight for Your Right"	Jallow; Ikeoluwa Oladigbolu	IO	3:17
4.	"Triumph"	Jallow; Jonathan Mensah	Jae5	2:50
5.	"Play Play" (featuring Burna Boy)	Jallow; Damini Ogulu; Nana Rogues; Mike Orabiyi Riley	Jae5; Nana Rogues; Scribz Riley	3:26
6.	"Cucumber"	Jallow; Mensah; Rogues	IO; Jae5; Nana Rogues	2:41
7.	"Repeat" (featuring Koffee)	Jallow; Mensah; Mikayla Simpson	Jae5	2:33
8.	"Fortune Teller"	Jallow; Oladigbolu; Levi Lennox	IO; Jae5; Levi Lennox; Maestro	2:35
9.	"Reckless"	Jallow; Sunny Kale; TSB	Sunny Kale; TSB	2:28
10.	"No Denying"	Jallow; TSB	TSB	3:48
11.	"Must Be"	Jallow; Mensah	Jae5	3:28
12.	"One and Only" (featuring Ella Mai)	Jallow; Mensah; Ella Mai	Jae5	3:29
13.	"Love, Peace and Prosperity"	Jallow; Mensah	Jae5	3:14
14.	"Deeper Than Rap"	Jallow; Oladigbolu; Mensah	IO; Jae5	4:06
Total length:				44:05

Notes

- The album's tracklist was updated on 4 February 2020 to include the song "One and Only".

== Charts ==
=== Weekly charts ===
Weekly chart performance for Big Conspiracy
Chart (2020)	Peak position
Belgian Albums (Ultratop Flanders)	83
Canadian Albums (Billboard)	92
Dutch Albums (Album Top 100)	31
Irish Albums (Official Charts)	5
Norwegian Albums (VG-lista)	32
Swedish Albums (Sverigetopplistan)	30
UK Albums (Official Charts)	1

=== Year-end charts ===
Year-end chart performance for Big Conspiracy
Chart (2020)	Position
UK Albums (OCC)	32

== Certifications ==
Certifications for Big Conspiracy
Region	Certification	Certified units/sales
United Kingdom (BPI)	Gold	100,000^{‡}
^{‡} Sales+streaming figures based on certification alone.
