= Common Sense (J Hus album) =

Studio album by J Hus
- Released: 12 May 2017
- Recorded: 2014–2016
- Genre: Afroswing; UK rap; dancehall; R&B
- Length: 55:49
- Label: Black Butter
- Producer: IO; Jae5; JOAT Music Group; Mark Crown; Steel Banglez; The Compozers; TSB

J Hus chronology
| The 15th Day (2015) | Common Sense (2017) | Big Conspiracy (2020) |

Singles from Common Sense
- 1. "Did You See" Released: 2 March 2017; 2. "Common Sense" Released: 4 May 2017; 3. "Spirit" Released: 30 July 2017; 4. "Bouff Daddy" Released: 16 November 2017

Common Sense is the debut studio album by British rapper J Hus. It was released on 12 May 2017 by Black Butter Records, distributed by Sony Music, for digital download and CD purchase. The album features production from long-time collaborator Jae5, along with guest appearances from MoStack, Mist, Tiggs da Author and Burna Boy.

Common Sense debuted at number six on the UK Albums Chart and received widespread acclaim from critics. It is certified Gold by the British Phonographic Industry (BPI). The lead single, "Did You See", peaked at number nine on the UK Singles Chart, becoming J Hus' highest-charting single. Complex ranked it number one on the UK's Best Albums of 2017.

== Background ==
Throughout 2015 and 2016, J Hus released a variety of singles, including "Lean & Bop", "Friendly" and "Playing Sports", along with the debut mixtape The 15th Day (2015), subsequently building a strong online presence.

In early April 2017, J Hus announced the track listing and release date for his debut album, Common Sense.

== Singles ==
The promotional single "Friendly" was released for digital download on 1 January 2016 after initially being premiered on SoundCloud.

The lead single "Did You See" was released on 2 March 2017, along with its music video. The song peaked at number 9 so far on the UK Singles Chart, becoming J Hus' first chart entry and highest-charting song.

== Critical reception ==
Professional ratings
Aggregate scores
| Source | Rating |
|---|---|
| AnyDecentMusic? | 7.5/10 |
| Metacritic | 84/100 |
Review scores
| Source | Rating |
| AllMusic | 3.5/5 stars |
| Clash | 9/10 |
| Evening Standard | 4/5 stars |
| Financial Times | 4/5 stars |
| The Guardian | 4/5 stars |
| The Irish Times | 3/5 stars |
| Mixmag | 9/10 |
| NME | 4/5 stars |
| The Observer | 4/5 stars |
| Pitchfork | 7.8/10 |

Upon release, Common Sense received widespread acclaim from critics. Kate Hutchinson of The Guardian praised Hus' blend of musical genres: "J Hus leads a wave of MCs who blend the genre's hard-hitting, distinctly UK flow with bashment and Afrobeat. Hus show that mix's true breadth, from playful braggadocio about partying, chasing girls and being, as one song title has it, the "Bouf Daddy", to introspective moments such as Spirit, on which loopy synths and polyrhythmic brilliance meet Hus's weary-sounding motivational speaker. The sound of the summer? You know it makes sense."

Will Pritchard of Clash stated: "This sound now has an album to pin to the mast. It'll soundtrack this summer, but don't be fooled into thinking that its time will be up by September. It's just common sense." Ludovic Hunter-Tilney of Financial Times commented: "The music is a rich blend of styles, in which hip-hop, R&B, dancehall and Afrobeats suggest not only Hus's versatility but also a world of expanding horizons."

Paul A. Thompson of Pitchfork commented: "The shifting musical styles underscore Hus' own versatility; he flits from a lilting sing-song to something more gruff and guttural easily and without hesitation", concluding Common Sense is "an excellent debut from an artist on the cusp."

=== Accolades ===
Common Sense was acknowledged in numerous year-end lists in 2017, particularly by international publishers.

Accolades for Common Sense
| Publication | Accolade | Rank | Ref. |
|---|---|---|---|
| Crack Magazine | The Top 100 Albums of 2017 | 17 | |
| Complex | Complex UK's Best Albums of 2017 | 1 | |
| Fact | The 50 Best Albums of 2017 | 7 | |
| NME | NME's Albums of the Year 2017 | 6 | |
| Pigeons and Planes | Best Albums of 2017 | 16 | |
| The Guardian | The Best Albums of 2017 | 14 | |

== Commercial performance ==
Common Sense debuted at number six on the UK Albums Chart and also entered the Dutch Album Top 100 and the Scottish Albums Chart. It is certified Gold by the British Phonographic Industry (BPI).

== Track listing ==
Common Sense track listing
| No. | Title | Writer(s) | Producer(s) | Length |
|---|---|---|---|---|
| 1. | "Common Sense" | Momodou Jallow; Nana Ntorinkansah; Jonathan Mensah; Stephen Asamoah; David Ohene-Akrasi; Charles Mensah-Bonsu | Jae5; The Compozers | 3:44 |
| 2. | "Bouff Daddy" | Jallow; Mensah | Jae5 | 3:25 |
| 3. | "Clartin" | Jallow; Mensah | Jae5 | 3:14 |
| 4. | "Leave Me" | Jallow; Mensah; Ayodele Oyadare | Jae5; IO | 3:23 |
| 5. | "Closed Doors" | Jallow; Mensah | Jae5 | 3:49 |
| 6. | "Did You See" | Jallow; Mensah | Jae5 | 3:01 |
| 7. | "Like Your Style" | Jallow; Mensah | Jae5 | 2:56 |
| 8. | "Plottin" | Jallow; Mensah | Jae5 | 2:31 |
| 9. | "Sweet Cheeks" | Jallow; Mensah; Oyadare | Jae5; IO | 3:01 |
| 10. | "Fisherman" (featuring MoStack and MIST) | Jallow; Mensah; Montell Daley; Rhys Thomas Sylvester; Pahuldip Singh Sandhu | Jae5; Steel Banglez | 2:57 |
| 11. | "Good Time" (featuring Burna Boy) | Jallow; Mensah; Damini Ogulu | Jae5 | 3:05 |
| 12. | "Spirit" | Jallow; Mensah; Ikeoluwa Oluwatobi Oladigbolu; Oyadare | Jae5; TSB; IO | 3:34 |
| 13. | "Mash Up" (featuring MoStack) | Jallow; Mensah; Daley | Jae5 | 3:38 |
| 14. | "Goodies" | Jallow; Mensah | Jae5 | 2:52 |
| 15. | "Good Luck Chale" (featuring Tiggs Da Author) | Jallow; Mensah; Ellis Taylor; Adam Simon | Jae5; Show N Prove | 3:12 |
| 16. | "Who You Are" | Jallow; Mensah | Jae5 | 3:32 |
| 17. | "Friendly" | Jallow; Mensah | Jae5 | 3:55 |
| Total length: | | | | 55:49 |

== Charts ==
=== Weekly charts ===
Weekly chart performance for Common Sense
| Chart (2017) | Peak position |
|---|---|
| Dutch Albums (Album Top 100) | 64 |
| Scottish Albums (OCC) | 52 |
| UK Albums (OCC) | 6 |

=== Year-end charts ===
2017 year-end chart performance for Common Sense
| Chart (2017) | Position |
|---|---|
| UK Albums (OCC) | 47 |

2018 year-end chart performance for Common Sense
| Chart (2018) | Position |
|---|---|
| UK Albums (OCC) | 66 |

== Certifications ==
Certifications for Common Sense
| Region | Certification | Certified units/sales |
|---|---|---|
| United Kingdom (BPI) | Platinum | 300,000^{‡} |
^{‡} Sales+streaming figures based on certification alone.

== Release history ==
Release history and formats for Common Sense
| Region | Date | Format | Label |
|---|---|---|---|
| Various | 12 May 2017 | Digital download; CD | Black Butter |
