= Who Told You =

Single by J Hus featuring Drake

from the album Beautiful and Brutal Yard
- Released: 8 June 2023
- Genre: Afroswing; Afrobeats
- Length: 3:28
- Label: Black Butter
- Songwriters: Momodou Jallow; Aubrey Graham; Richard Isong; Gaetan Judd; EY
- Producer: P2J

J. Hus singles chronology
"It's Crazy" (2023)	"Who Told You" (2023)	"Militerian" (2023)

Drake singles chronology
"Search & Rescue" (2023)	"Who Told You" (2023)	"Oh U Went" (2023)

"Who Told You" is a song by British rapper J Hus featuring Canadian rapper Drake. It was released on 8 June 2023 as the second single from J Hus's third studio album, Beautiful and Brutal Yard. J Hus and Drake wrote the song with producer P2J, alongside Gaetan Judd and EY.

== Critical reception ==
Professional ratings
Review scores
Source	Rating
The Guardian	4/5 stars

Ben Beaumont-Thomas of The Guardian called it the "song of the summer" and wrote, "this ode to the joy of dancing shows how masterful each MC is at moving with a beat". Beaumont-Thomas also felt that the "Afrobeats rhythm by producer P2J is nimble and fleet of foot", characterising the song as being "about the very pleasure of dancing, in particular dancing close to someone hot". Eric Brain of Hypebeast felt that the "track pulls heavily from J Hus' afroswing sounds, something the Stratford, London-born-and-bred rapper has pioneered". Tomás Mier also described the track as a "sweet summery Afroswing bop".

== Commercial performance ==
The song debuted at number two in the UK Singles Chart on 16 June 2023, becoming J Hus's highest-charting single to date. It was kept off the top spot by Dave and Central Cee's "Sprinter". However it reached number one on the UK Afrobeats Singles Chart. As of July 2025, the single has moved 666,398 units in the United Kingdom, respectively.

== Charts ==
=== Weekly charts ===
Weekly chart performance for "Who Told You"
Chart (2023)	Peak position
Australia (ARIA)	67
Canada Hot 100 (Billboard)	27
Denmark (Tracklisten)	28
Global 200 (Billboard)	38
Ireland (IRMA)	4
Netherlands (Single Top 100)	17
New Zealand Hot Singles (RMNZ)	3
Norway (VG-lista)	22
Portugal (AFP)	95
Sweden (Sverigetopplistan)	32
Switzerland (Schweizer Hitparade)	17
UK Singles (OCC)	2
UK Hip Hop/R&B (OCC)	2
US Bubbling Under Hot 100 (Billboard)	1
US Hot R&B/Hip-Hop Songs (Billboard)	35

=== Year-end charts ===
Year-end chart performance for "Who Told You"
Chart (2023)	Position
UK Singles (OCC)	62

== Certifications ==
Certifications for "Who Told You"
Region	Certification	Certified units/sales
Nigeria (TCSN)	Silver	25,000^{‡}
Switzerland (IFPI Switzerland)	Gold	10,000^{‡}
United Kingdom (BPI)	Platinum	600,000^{‡}
^{‡} Sales+streaming figures based on certification alone.
