= Beautiful and Brutal Yard =

Studio album by J Hus
- Released: 14 July 2023
- Genres: Drill; dancehall; Afrobeat; hip-hop
- Length: 63:02
- Label: Black Butter
- Producers: EY, Maestro The Baker, TSB, Marco Bernardis, P2J, Alex Blake, iO, Levi Lennox, Scribz Riley, The Elements, Fumes, Lekaa Beats, Sammy Soso

J Hus chronology
Big Conspiracy (2020)	Beautiful and Brutal Yard (2023)

Singles from Beautiful and Brutal Yard
- 1. "It's Crazy" Released: 24 May 2023; 2. "Who Told You" Released: 8 June 2023; 3. "Militerian" Released: 13 July 2023

Beautiful and Brutal Yard (also abbreviated B.A.B.Y) is the third studio album by British rapper J Hus, released on 14 July 2023 through Black Butter Records. The album includes collaborations with Drake, Naira Marley, Jorja Smith, Burna Boy, Popcaan, CB, Villz and Boss Belly. It was preceded by the singles "It's Crazy" and "Who Told You" featuring Drake. J Hus planned to tour the UK and Ireland in October and November 2023 in support of the album, but faced many legal hurdles. The album was shortlisted for the 2023 Mercury Prize.

== Background and promotion ==
In May 2023, Spotify-sponsored billboards appeared in London. The billboards were labelled "Don't Say Militancy" and included a phone number. When called, a voicemail would play that confirmed an upcoming J Hus album. Shortly after, the album's lead single "It's Crazy" released. On 8 June 2023. the second single "Who Told You" released.

The album's announcement on 29 June 2023 was accompanied by a trailer in which J Hus walks through his own mansion before being delivered a vinyl copy of his album and before he is transported "in front of a beat-down neighborhood". A voiceover by Idris Elba states, "No matter what's going on around me, I'm still myself. And now my eyes are open and I can see the beauty of everything. I always calculate trying to challenge destiny and test fate. Welcome to my Beautiful and Brutal Yard, may peace be onto you."

== Critical reception ==
Professional ratings
Aggregate scores
Source	Rating
Metacritic	83/100
Review scores
Source	Rating
Clash	8/10
The Guardian	4/5 stars
The Line of Best Fit	8/10
Mixtape Madness	4/5
NME	4/5 stars
Pitchfork	8.1/10
The Telegraph	4/5 stars

Beautiful and Brutal Yard received a score of 83 out of 100 on review aggregator Metacritic based on seven critics' reviews, indicating "universal acclaim". Alexis Petridis of The Guardian named it his album of the week and noted, "that its polarities hold together for more than an hour is partly down to J Hus's famed adaptability, his facility to ride any beat thrown his way". NME's Niall Smith described it as "a scattershot burst of brilliance" as well as "an elongated, yet joyous return from J Hus", who "channels his lyrical potency, struggles and romantic pursuits into one unified portrait". Hayley Milross of The Line of Best Fit stated that the album "shows Hus display his greatest quality – his music" and "displays both the beauty and brutality of the world", calling it "an album that connotes the essence of home, and his home is his music". Clash's Dwayne Wilks wrote that while the album "remind[s] us why [J Hus is] so adored", he found that there is "less of his story" and it does not reach the heights of J Hus's previous two albums, but concluded "no other artist commands rhythm and rhyme like Hus, and it's patently clear that the Stratford rapper is enjoying making music again, which is a blessing for the rest of us". Will Pritchard, reviewing the album for The Telegraph, called it "the record of the summer" along with "thrilling, hip-twisting, [and] unsettling", on which "Hus still leads the pack with his pitless charisma, linguistic inventiveness, and musical curiosity". Pritchard, writing for Pitchfork, described it a "carnal and philosophical investigation of masculinity against lush, robust beats that evoke a distinctly Black British take on G-funk".

=== Year-end lists ===
Select year-end rankings of Beautiful and Brutal Yard
Publication	List	Rank	Ref.
Complex UK	Complex UK's Best Albums of 2023	3	
The Line of Best Fit	The Best Albums of 2023	32	

== Commercial performance ==
In the United Kingdom, Beautiful and Brutal Yard debuted at number one on the UK Albums Chart, with first-week sales of 17,260 album-equivalent units. The sales consisted of 1,722 CDs, 557 vinyls, 294 cassettes, 305 digital downloads, and 14,383 sales-equivalent streams.

== Track listing ==
Beautiful and Brutal Yard track listing
No.	Title	Writer(s)	Producer(s)	Length
1.	"Intro (The GOAT)"	Momodou Lamin Jallow; Eyobed Getachew; Ifeoluwa Oladigbolu; Tobi Oladigbolu	E.Y.; Maestro The Baker; TobiShyBoy	2:13
2.	"Massacre"	Jallow; Marco Bernardis; Richard Isong	Marco Bernardis; P2J	3:31
3.	"Who Told You" (featuring Drake)	Jallow; Aubrey Graham; Getachew; Gaetan Judd; Isong; [[]]	E.Y.; Gaetan Judd; P2J	3:28
4.	"Militerian" (featuring Naira Marley)	Jallow; Azeez Fashola; Isong	P2J; Stuart Hawkes	3:13
5.	"Palm Tree"	Jallow; Alex Blake; Ayodele Oyadare; Levi Malundama; Oladigbolu	Alex Blake; iO; Levi Lennox; TobiShyBoy	2:38
6.	"Nice Body" (featuring Jorja Smith)	Jallow; Jorja Smith; Malundama; Paul Goller; Keven Wolfsohn; Oladigbolu	Levi Lennox; The Elements; TobiShyBoy	3:34
7.	"Masculine" (featuring Burna Boy)	Jallow; Damini Ogulu; Malundama; Oladigbolu	Levi Lennox; TobiShyBoy	3:24
8.	"Come Look"	Jallow; Oyadare; Oladigbolu	iO; TobiShyBoy	3:00
9.	"Cream" (featuring CB)	Jallow; Lekan Akinsoji; Karan Behl; Goller; Wolfsohn	Fumes Beats; The Elements	3:23
10.	"Comeback" (featuring Villz)	Jallow; Joel Currie; Oyadare; Oladigbolu	TobiShyBoy	3:50
11.	"Alien Girl"	Jallow; Behl; Oyadare; Oladigbolu	Fumes Beats; iO; TobiShyBoy	3:11
12.	"Fresh Water/Safa Kara"	Jallow; Getachew; Malundama; Oladigbolu; Judd; Cole Ostrin	E.Y.; Levi Lennox; TobiShyBoy	3:57
13.	"My Baby"	Jallow; Getachew; Oladigbolu	E.Y.; TobiShyBoy	3:56
14.	"Problem Fixer"	Jallow; Babatope Bello; Isong; Oladigbolu	Lekaa Beats; P2J; TobiShyBoy	2:50
15.	"Killy" (featuring Popcaan)	Jallow; Andrae Sutherland; Malundama; Oladigbolu	Levi Lennox; TobiShyBoy	3:03
16.	"It's Crazy"	Jallow; Behl; Goller; Wolfsohn	Fumes Beats; The Elements	3:46
17.	"Bim Bim"	Jallow; Behl; Goller; Wolfsohn	Fumes Beats; The Elements	2:53
18.	"Come Gully Bun (Gambian President)" (featuring Boss Belly)	Jallow; Boss Belly; Oyadare; Oladigbolu	TobiShyBoy	3:08
19.	"Playing Chess"	Jallow; Isong; Samuel Awuku	P2J; Sammy Soso	4:04
Total length:				63:02

== Charts ==
Chart performance for Beautiful and Brutal Yard
Chart (2023)	Peak position
Australian Hitseekers Albums (ARIA)	2
Belgian Albums (Ultratop Flanders)	70
Canadian Albums (Billboard)	87
Danish Albums (Hitlisten)	38
Dutch Albums (Album Top 100)	19
French Albums (SNEP)	169
Irish Albums (IRMA)	14
Norwegian Albums (VG-lista)	21
Scottish Albums (Official Charts)	19
Swiss Albums (Schweizer Hitparade)	41
UK Albums (Official Charts)	1
UK R&B Albums (Official Charts)	1

== Certifications ==
Region	Certification	Certified units/sales
United Kingdom (BPI)	Gold	100,000^{‡}
^{‡} Sales+streaming figures based on certification alone.
