= Sus (rapper) =

British rapper and convicted murderer

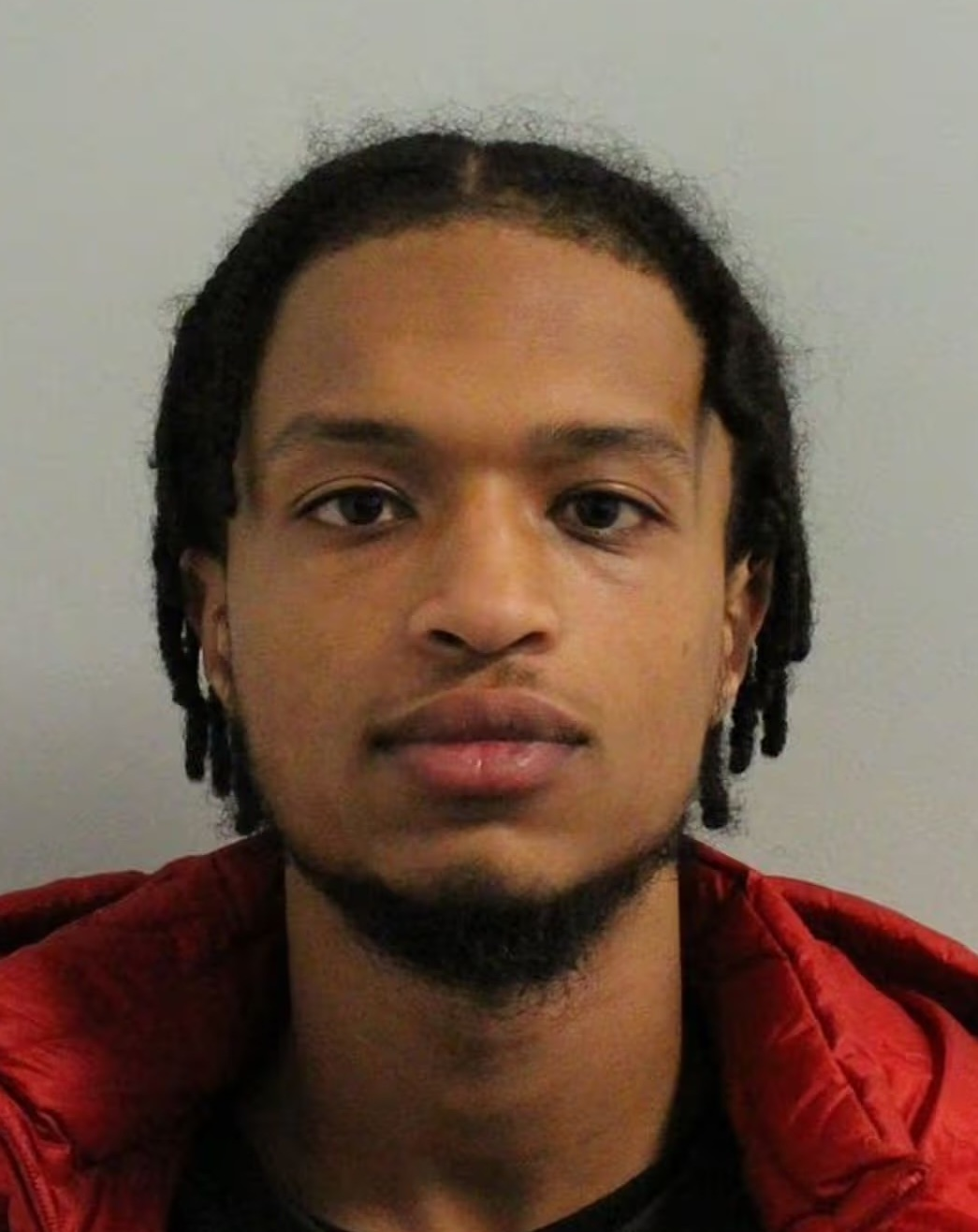
- Monteiro in 2023

Background information
- Also known as: Suspect; Suspect (AGB); Grim Reaper; Sus
- Born: Tariq Kennedy Mangal Monteiro; 27 February 2000 (age 26)
- Origin: Camden Town, London, England
- Genres: British hip hop; UK drill
- Occupations: Rapper; songwriter
- Member of: Active Gxng/AGB

Tariq Kennedy Mangal Monteiro (born 27 February 2000) known professionally as Sus or Suspect, is a British rapper and convicted murderer. He is a member of the UK drill collective Active Gxng (also known as AGB), who are based in the Agar Grove estate within Camden Town, London. He released his debut mixtape, Suspicious Activity, in 2022.

== Background and early life ==
Monteiro is a descendant of Bissau-Guinean and Moroccan parents.

In 2014, Monteiro was reported as missing from his foster home in Tottenham; at the time, he was in the care of Camden London Borough Council.

== Career ==
In 2020, Monteiro released "Turn Up" alongside T Scam; GRM Daily described the pair in the song as "Not holding anything back as they offload some unapologetically honest bars lyrics aimed at certain people in their lives." He also appeared on Fumez the Engineer's Plugged In series alongside 2smokeyy.

In January 2021, he appeared on "Who's Bad" alongside SWavey, Yevz and 2Smokeyy; this was followed by the release of "Block Heroes" with Nino in February and "MoonWalk" in March. In August, he appeared on "Double Tap" by Fredo, which appeared on Independence Day; it peaked at number 73 on the UK Singles Chart. He also appeared on Mixtape Madness's The Cold Room series with T Scam.

In September, Monteiro appeared on a remix of "Snap It" by SR and on "Woosh & Push" by Loski. In October, he released "Encore", noted by GRM Daily as "a quality release that showcases Suspect’s deep cadence and his engaging bars." He released "Freestyle" in December.

In 2022, he released "Frostbite" with Nino Uptown. He also released his debut mixtape, Suspicious Activity, that February.

In June and July 2025, Monteiro started releasing songs as singles from his upcoming album Suspicious Activity 2. The songs he did release were “Filthy” and “Menace to Society”. In November, he released "War", another song from the album. On New Years Day 2026, Monteiro released “Bodies and Flights” with AB (Hammerville) and released Gravedigga on the 15th January.

== Murder conviction ==
In January 2022 Monteiro was arrested with Siyad Mohamud (known as SWavey) in Nairobi, Kenya, where they had fled after committing a murder in London, and deported to Britain. They both appeared at Westminster Magistrates' Court on Monday 31 January 2022 and were remanded in custody, charged with the 2019 murder of 16-year-old Alex Smith. According to the prosecutor, Monteiro and Mohamud were part of a group of six who were seen driving around in stolen vehicles looking for rival gang members to attack. Upon spotting Alex Smith, a member of the rival Cumbo Pagans gang, the group carried out a "planned and sustained" assault, and he was chased on foot and fatally stabbed in a nearby street.

Monteiro and Mohamud were tried at the Old Bailey, convicted, and on 12 May 2023, sentenced to life imprisonment, Monteiro for a minimum of 24 years. The judge described the murder as an example of a "needless loss of a teenage life", and added that Monteiro and Mohamud had set out to kill their victim, then "fled the jurisdiction, escaped justice and celebrated the killing" by posting videos about the stabbing online.

== Discography ==
=== Mixtapes ===
- Suspicious Activity (2022)
- Kenny Krueger (2024)
- Suspicious Activity 2 (2026)

=== Charted singles ===
List of singles, with selected peak chart positions
Title	Year	Peak chart positions	Album
Title	Year	UK	Album
"Double Tap" (Fredo featuring Sus)	2021	73	Independence Day

=== Guest appearances ===
List of non-single guest appearances, with other performing artists
Title	Year	Other artist(s)	Album
"Block Heroes"	2021	Nino Uptown	Non-album single
"Snap It (Remix)"	2021	SR, Loski, SD, Trap	Non-album single
"Woosh and Push"	2021	Loski	Censored
"OPP BLOCK TOUR"	2022	KTM Henny	Non-album single
"Frostbite"	2022	Nino Uptown	Album single
