= SR (rapper) =

British rapper

- Born: Carl Latricio Brown; 29 May 1999 (age 27); Croydon, London
- Origin: Brixton, London, England
- Genres: British hip hop; UK drill
- Occupations: Rapper; songwriter
- Years active: 2020–present

Carl Latricio Brown (born 29 May 1999), known professionally as SR, is a British rapper who went viral for his single "Welcome to Brixton" in 2020. His follow-up song, "Practice Makes Perfect", was named in the top 10 songs to come out of the United Kingdom by DJBooth in May 2021.

== Career ==
SR released his debut single "Brucky" in June 2020. "Welcome to Brixton", his breakout single, was released in July 2020, which charted on the UK Singles Chart on 20 May 2021 and peaked at number 93. As of January 2022, “Welcome to Brixton” has received over 65 million views on YouTube and over 200 million streams on Spotify and Apple Music.

In 2021, he released "Snap It"; a remix of the song was later released in September the same year, featuring Loski, Sus, SD, and Trap.

== Discography ==
=== Singles ===
List of singles, with selected peak chart positions
Title	Year	Peak chart positions		Certifications
Title	Year	UK	IRE	Certifications
"Brucky"	2020	—	—	
"Ring"	2020	—	—	
"Welcome to Brixton"	2020	93	92	ARIA: Platinum
"Practice Makes Perfect"	2021	—	—	
"Snap It"	2021	—	—	
"Brucky 2.0"	2021	—	—	
"Catch Me Outside" (feat. SD, Doubleback, Trap SG and HK)	2022	—	—	
"What's Good" (with Poundz)	2022	—	—	
"—" denotes items which were not released in that country or failed to chart.

== Awards and nominations ==
Year	Award	Nominated work	Category	Result	Ref.
2021	GRM Daily Rated Awards	Himself	Breakthrough of the Year	Nominated	
2021	MOBO Awards	Himself	Best Drill Act	Nominated	
