= Irish rap =

Music genre or scene

Irish hip-hop, also known as Irish rap, is a term for any hip-hop music produced and performed by a person who was born or grew up in Ireland. This genre is made up of a variety of subgenres such as Irish grime/drill, Irish language rap, alternative rap and Irish trap.

Irish hip-hop originated in the early 1990s being influenced by the 1970s movement for hip-hop in New York. The original Irish hip-hop was politically driven due to the tension of The Troubles in the early 1990s, and mixed music styles of both traditional music and Rudeboy Dancehall. Irish rap genres, such as drill and grime, are mainly influenced by UK rap while alt-rap and Irish hip-hop have a greater influence from the US. Irish rap is mainly listened to by people in Ireland and to a lesser extent people in the UK.

== Genres ==
=== Alt rap ===
Alt rap (a.k.a. alternative hip-hop) is a subgenre of hip-hop that does not conform to traditional hip-hop genres but instead blurs genres together. Alt rap first came on the scene in late 1980s when artists such as De La Soul, A Tribe Called Quest and The Pharcyde began combining existing genres of hip-hop to create music with an undefined genre, but mainly hip-hop influence. This is the most commercially successful out of all the Irish rap genres.

==== Artists ====
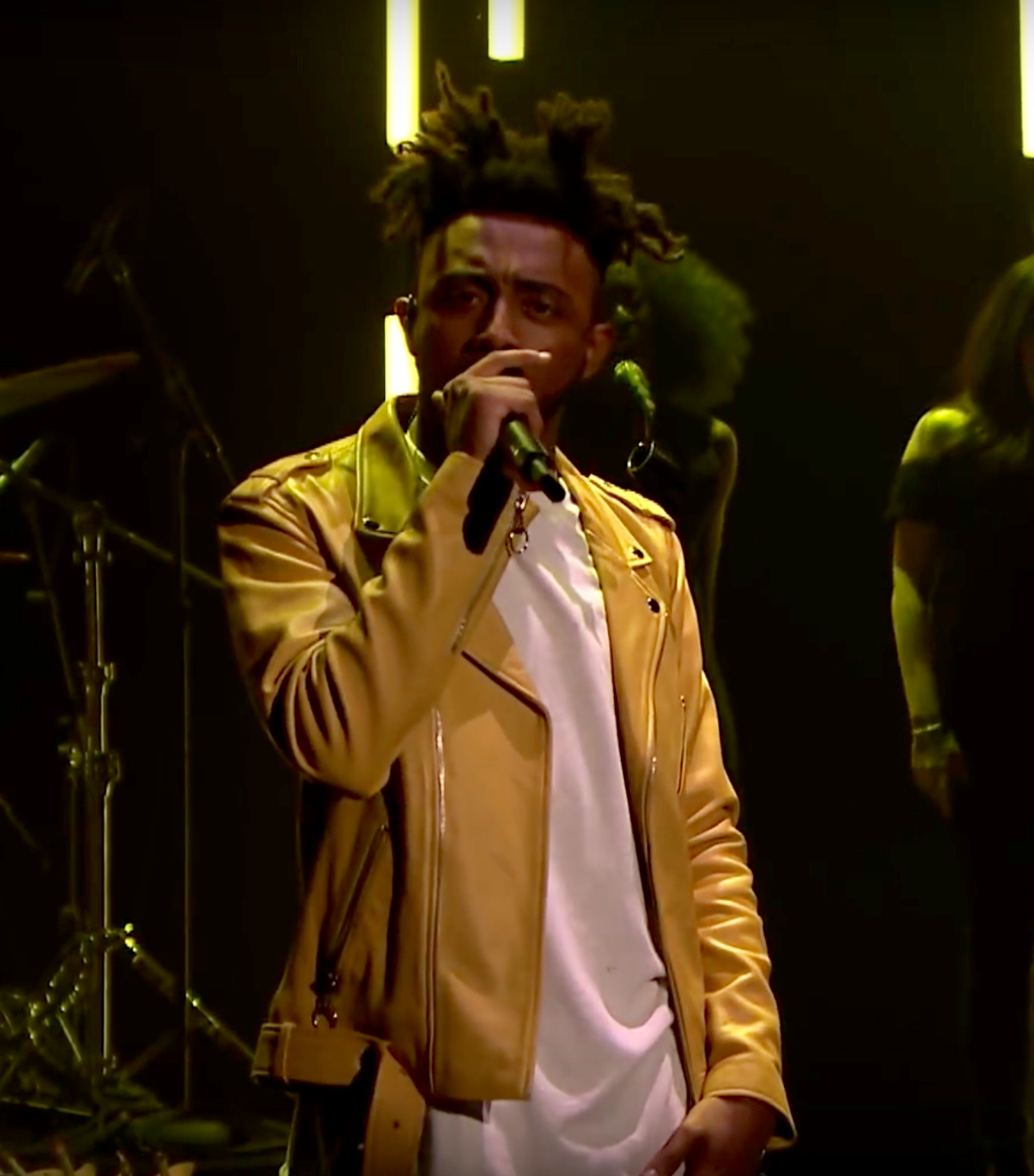
Rapper Amine worked with Rejjie Snow for their 2018 collaboration 'Egyptian Luvr'

Rejjie Snow is one of the most commercially successful Irish rappers. He is from Drumcondra, Dublin and specialises in alternative rap. Having grown up in Dublin and relocating to Florida then Georgia, and having Jamaican/Nigerian heritage, Rejjie Snow is influenced by US Alt Rappers Tyler The Creator and N.E.R.D.

Snow's first album Dear Annie had mixed reviews with a Metacritic score of 79. The album, however, gained over 185 million streams since its release in 2018. Snow achieved his first song to exceed 100 million streams on Spotify whilst collaborating with American singer Clairo on her 2018 EP Diary 001. The song was the opening song of the EP and was titled "Hello?". Despite not officially being made a single, the song went on to be RIAA certified gold and garner over 150 million streams on Spotify. Rejjie Snow also has collaborations with US artists such as Aminé, MF Doom, Joey Bada$$, Tinashe, and Snoh Aalegra.

Other alt rappers in Ireland include Hare Squead, Hygashy, Rejjie Snow, Lallee, Versatile, Malaki, and Denise Chaila. Some of these rappers have also collaborated with other artists. For example, Denise Chaila collaborated with Ed Sheeran on his song "2step", Versatile collaborated with Coolio on their song "Escape Wagon", and Rejjie Snow's collaborated with Amine 'Egyptian Luvr'.

=== Grime/drill ===
Grime is an eclectic style of British rap music that emerged in London in the early 2000s. It features elements of a variety of genres such as dancehall, hip-hop, and electronic music. UK grime was initially broadcast in the UK on pirate radio stations, without a broadcasting license, which initially prevented it from achieving success in the UK.

Drill is a subgenre of hip-hop with lyricism resembling gangsta rap and beats similar to trap music with a focus on a deep bass. It originated in Chicago in the early 2010s and emerged in London, England in 2012. American drill artists include Chief Keef, Pop Smoke, and Fivio Foreign, and UK drill artists include Tion Wayne, Aitch, and Digga D.

Both UK grime and UK drill influenced the genres of Irish grime/drill when it was introduced in Ireland during the 2010s. The Irish grime/drill scene is a niche market with similar lyricism, style, and beats as UK grime/drill.

==== Artists ====
Two examples of Irish grime/drill rappers are the eight-man rap group A92, and one of their members Tomas Adeyinka (Offica). A92 and Offica's collaboration with English producer, Fumez the Engineer, "Plugged" in Freestyle', charted for 12 weeks on the Irish charts peaking at #29 and charted for 11 weeks on the UK charts peaking at #39.

A92 is an Irish drill and hip-hop group with eight members. They are from Drogheda, Ireland which has a postal code of A92, hence their name. The group rose to notability when their "Plugged in Freestyle" took off on TikTok. Users began using the audio for "Plugged in Freestyle" due to Dbo's deep voice which contrasts with Ksav's previous verse. TikToker Joshuaadzz was able to gain over 500 thousand likes on multiple videos using this trend. A92 has also gathered millions of streams on other songs such as their Next Up Freestyle for Mixtape Madness, Season Finale with Fumez the Engineer, and A9 Link up. Group member Offica has also found individual success with songs like Bluebird and Naruto Drillings, which was remixed by YouTuber KSI in 2019.

Other Irish grime/drill artists include Smilez, INK, GOMiE, Granvil and Chuks.

=== Irish language rap ===
Irish people who speak the Irish language in 2011

Rap as Gaeilge ('rapping in Irish') is a subgenre of hip-hop that uses the Irish language in the lyrics. Traces of Irish language rap can be found in the 1990s from artists such as ScaryÉire and Marxman. The beat and style of rap is heavily influenced by reggae and Jamaican dancehall, with lyrical focus on political matters. Similar to how US hip-hop has been a staple for black resistance, Irish hip-hop is used to express Irish resistance. Although the troubles ended in 1998 with the Good Friday Agreement, the effects still are felt by the people of Ireland, particularly those in Northern Ireland. These effects can be seen in the lyrics of Irish language rappers such as KNEECAP.

This is a niche genre of rap with few listeners. As of 2022, approximately 1.87 million people said they can speak Irish, with only 72 thousand speaking it daily. This lack of Irish knowledge causes Irish language rappers to have a limited target audience.

==== Artists ====
KNEECAP are a Belfast trio, consisting of Mo Chara, Móglaí Bap, & DJ Próvaí, who rap mainly in Irish with some English mix. The group have pioneered the popularity of Rap as Gaeilge by becoming the first Irish speaking rap group to achieve three songs exceeding 1 million streams on Spotify (Get Your Brits Out, H.O.O.D & C.E.A.R.T.A). Their songs contain nationalist messages and their strong stance on creating a United Ireland. Due to their lyrics, one of their tracks was pulled from the schedule on RTÉ Raidió na Gaeltachta. While some critique the trio for its mention of drugs and violence, others commend the band for their effort to bring back the Irish language and allow the Irish to rediscover their culture. The trio has been described as one of the pioneers of Irish rap by The NY Times, The Guardian, and the LA Times.

=== Punk ===
Elayne Harrington aka Temper-Mental MissElayneous released her debut EP, Proletarian Restitution, and the single "Step in the ring" in 2012. The same year, she had a poem published in The Stinging Fly. By then, she had an online following and encouraged girls in Finglas to express themselves through rap. She appeared in the 2012 documentary Ireland's Rappers and in the 2014 RTÉ2 reality series Connected. President Michael D. Higgins, seeing her perform in 2012, said she was "letting her life flow through the rhythms and sounds." Her style of rap has been described as Anarcho-Punk.

Other Irish language rappers include Imlé, Hazey Haze, and Ushmush.
