= Offica =

Irish rapper

- Also known as: Obito; Tobi
- Born: Tomas Adedayo Adeyinka; September 2000 (age 26); Lagos, Nigeria
- Origin: Drogheda, Ireland
- Genres: Irish hip hop; Irish drill
- Occupations: Rapper; songwriter
- Instrument: Vocals
- Years active: 2018–present
- Label: Moves Recordings
- Member of: A92

Tomas Adedayo Adeyinka (born September 2000), commonly known by his stage name Offica, is an Irish rapper of Nigerian descent. During a youth soccer career between 2016 and 2019, he released his debut single "No Hook" in 2018, going viral following the release of "Naruto Drillings" in 2019 and "Plugged in Freestyle" alongside drill collective A92 in 2020.

== Early life ==
Tomas Adeyinka was born in Lagos, Nigeria in 2000. At the age of six, his family moved to Drogheda, Ireland, where he currently lives. Tomas' sister, Victoria, is a social media personality, and has been accredited by The Irish Times as "the most popular TikTok creator in Ireland". He is a Christian, and is studying global business at Maynooth University.

Prior to his musical career, Tomas played for Drogheda United F.C.'s under-17 team as a midfielder in the 2016–17 season; he appeared in 21 games. He joined its under-19 team in March 2018; by 2019, he played as a substitute, having appeared in 11 games (as well as one game for Drogheda United in the 2018–19 Leinster Senior Cup) in the 2018–19 season.

== Career ==
Offica released his debut single "No Hook" in late 2018, at the age of 18; the single gained over 100,000 views on YouTube. In an interview with Hot Press, he stated that

"Around that time, I had college, music and football to juggle together...but I got a lot of injuries, and I was doing decent in music – which made my decision to pick music easier."

In 2019, he released his breakout single "Naruto Drillings", later releasing a remix with British YouTuber KSI, which gained 900,000 views the day after its release on YouTube. He later released "Skiddibop", featuring Fizzler, a British rapper, in November.

Offica released three singles, "Face Reveal", "Where's the Motive?" with Blanco and Reggie, and "Opor", in 2020. He was also featured on "Movie" by Evans Junior, which was released the same year. Regarding "Opor", Ben Beaumont-Thomas, music editor for The Guardian, said in 2021:

"His accent, situated between his Irish and Nigerian heritage, gives his lyrics a mournful musicality, particularly on the standout 2020 track, Opor."

In mid-2020, the drill collective A92, based around Offica's hometown of Drogheda, was formed, with Offica joining following its formation; its debut single, "A9 Link Up", was released in September. The group would later rise to popularity following the release of its "Plugged in Freestyle".

In January 2021, Offica released "TAKE IT (YUCK)", later starring on Versatile's "Babyproof", which was released in March. In April, Offica announced that he would be going on tour in Ireland and the UK; he also announced that he would be releasing an untitled mixtape. In May, Offica released "Obito"; its music video gained over 320,000 views in the three days after its release on YouTube.

== Discography ==
=== Singles ===
==== As lead artist ====
List of singles, with selected peak chart positions
Title	Year	Peak chart positions	
Title	Year	IRE	UK
"No Hook"	2018	—	—
"Afrodrip"	2019	—	—
"Naruto Drillings" (Solo or remix featuring KSI)	2019	—	—
"Snakes and Scorpions"	2019	—	—
"Skiddibop" (with Fizzler)	2019	—	—
"Face Reveal"	2020	—	—
"Where's the Motive?" (with Reggie and Blanco)	2020	—	—
"Opor"	2020	—	—
"Mad About Bars"	2020	—	—
"Fire in the Booth"	2020	—	—
"Plugged in Freestyle" (with Fumez the Engineer and A92)	2020	29	39
"TAKE IT (YUCK)" (with Dbo)	2021	—	—
"OBITO"	2021	—	—
"Blue Bird"	2021	—	—
"D-Town Baby" (with Dbo, Ksav, BT and Nikz)	2021	—	—
"Sharingan"	2022	—	—
"Plugged In" (with Fumez the Engineer)	2022	—	—
"Kolomental" (with Dbo and Darkovibes)	2022	—	—
"—" denotes items which were not released in that country or failed to chart.

==== As featured artist ====
List of singles as featured artist, with selected peak chart positions
Title	Year	Peak chart positions
Title	Year	IRE
"Movie" (Evans Junior featuring Offica)	2020	—
"Babyproof" (Versatile featuring Offica)	2021	97
"Plugged In" (as member of A92; Fumez the Engineer featuring Suspect, PR SAD, DoRoad, R6, A92, Pete & Bas, Kwengface and PS Hitsquad)	2021	—
"Oggy" (Sello featuring Offica)	2021	—
"—" denotes items which were not released in that country or failed to chart.

==== Guest appearances ====
List of non-single guest appearances, with other performing artists
Title	Year	Other artist(s)	Album
"Dumb Flex (Remix)"	2021	Miss LaFamilia, Ivorian Doll, Poundz, Dbo	Non-album single

== Filmography ==
Year	Title	Role	Ref.
2022	Terms & Conditions: Deeper Than Drill	Himself	

== Awards and nominations ==
Year	Award	Nominated work	Category	Result	Ref.
2021	Black & Irish Awards	Himself	Male Artist of the Year	Won	
