= Man's Not Hot =

2017 novelty song by Michael Dapaah

Single by Big Shaq
- Released: 22 September 2017
- Genre: Comedy hip-hop; novelty; UK drill
- Length: 3:06
- Label: Island
- Songwriter: Michael Dapaah
- Producers: GottiOnEm; Mazza

Big Shaq singles chronology
"Man's Not Hot" (2017)	"Man Don't Dance" (2018)

Music video
- "Man's Not Hot" on YouTube

"Man's Not Hot" is a comedy hip-hop novelty song by the British comedian Michael Dapaah, in character as the fictional UK drill rapper Big Shaq. It samples an instrumental by GottiOnEm and Mazza, which was first used on 86's "Lurk" and later on "Let's Lurk" by 67 featuring Giggs. The song saw commercial success, peaking at number three on the UK Singles Chart. The song has been certified platinum in the United Kingdom by the BPI, indicating 600,000 combined sales and streams. The music video has gained over 446 million views on YouTube as of February 2026.

== Background and release ==
On 10 May 2017, Michael Dapaah uploaded a sketch to his Instagram featuring his character Roadman Shaq "freestyling" to the instrumental of "Lurk" by UK drill group 86 (also used on the 2016 song "Let's Lurk" by UK drill group 67 and rapper Giggs).

On 19 July, an extended version of the freestyle appeared in episode six of the first series of his mockumentary SWIL, when he performed it in front of 67 as Roadman Shaq.

On 29 August, Dapaah went on BBC Radio 1Xtra as both his characters MC Quakez and Roadman Shaq for the Charlie Sloth-hosted "Fire in the Booth" segment. He performed a version of the freestyle which subsequently went viral, gaining millions of views on YouTube, and inspiring many internet memes. In response to the unprecedented popularity of the segment, Dapaah changed his character's name to "Big Shaq" and converted the freestyle into a commercial single called "Man's Not Hot", released on Island Records on 22 September.

The song was covered by American hip hop band The Roots on The Tonight Show Starring Jimmy Fallon, when retired American basketball player Shaquille O'Neal appeared as a guest on 10 October 2017. On 16 October, O'Neal released a diss track criticising Dapaah for calling himself "Big Shaq".

On 15 December 2017, Man's Not Hot (The Remixes), an album comprising remixes of the song by various artists, was released, alongside a "Christmas edition" of the song. An "MC Mix" of the song, featuring British rappers Lethal Bizzle, Chip, Krept & Konan and Jme, was released on 29 December.

In June 2018, the song trended in Malta.

== Critical reception ==
Pitchfork listed "Man's Not Hot" at number 93 on their list of the 100 best songs of 2017, opining that it "joins in a tradition of songs (e.g. the Darkness' "I Believe in a Thing Called Love") that so expertly lampoon their chosen genre they become part of its firmament."

== Remix ==
American rapper Futuristic released his remix of the song on 13 January 2018.

== Music video ==
Dapaah released the music video for "Man's Not Hot" on 26 October 2017. It begins with a phone call from someone called Asznee, who is later revealed to be entertainer Chunkz. It then features Dapaah rapping the song in Toronto and Miami, wearing his trademark jacket. The video features cameos from American rappers Waka Flocka Flame, Lil Yachty, Jim Jones, Dutch rap group Broederliefde and American producer DJ Khaled, who calls Dapaah's character a "legend".

== Track listing ==
Digital download
No.	Title	Length
1.	"Man's Not Hot"	3:06

CD single
No.	Title	Length
1.	"Man's Not Hot"	3:08
2.	"Man's Not Hot" (Instrumental)	3:08
Total length:		6:16

Digital download – The Remixes
No.	Title	Length
1.	"Man's Not Hot" (Black Caviar Remix)	3:04
2.	"Man's Not Hot" (HIGHSOCIETY Remix)	4:01
3.	"Man's Not Hot" (The Blockparty and Kempi Remix)	1:48
4.	"Man's Not Hot" (2Scratch Remix)	3:34
5.	"Man's Not Hot" (Dirty Palm Remix)	3:46
6.	"Man's Not Hot" (Majestic Remix)	4:51
7.	"Man's Not Hot" (P Montana Afrobeat Mix)	3:23
8.	"Man's Not Hot" (Instrumental)	3:05

Digital download – Christmas Edition
No.	Title	Length
1.	"Man's Not Hot" (Christmas Edition)	3:23
2.	"Man's Not Hot" (Christmas Edition Instrumental)	3:22

Digital download – MC Mix
No.	Title	Length
1.	"Man's Not Hot" (MC Mix) (featuring Lethal Bizzle, Chip, Krept & Konan and Jme)	5:20

== Charts ==
=== Weekly charts ===
Chart (2017–2018)	Peak position
Australia (ARIA)	28
Austria (Ö3 Austria Top 40)	33
Belgium (Ultratop 50 Flanders)	16
Belgium (Ultratip Bubbling Under Wallonia)	10
Canada Hot 100 (Billboard)	48
Czech Republic Singles Digital (ČNS IFPI)	21
Denmark (Tracklisten)	21
Germany (GfK)	26
Hungary (Single Top 40)	20
Hungary (Stream Top 40)	23
Ireland (IRMA)	13
Latvia (DigiTop100)	18
Netherlands (Single Top 100)	20
New Zealand (Recorded Music NZ)	22
Norway (VG-lista)	23
Portugal (AFP)	55
Scottish Singles Sales (Official Charts)	10
Slovakia Singles Digital (ČNS IFPI)	31
South Korea International (Circle)	76
Sweden (Sverigetopplistan)	15
Switzerland (Schweizer Hitparade)	41
UK Singles (Official Charts)	3

=== Year-end charts ===
Chart (2017)	Position
UK Singles (Official Charts Company)	92

== Certifications ==
Region	Certification	Certified units/sales
Australia (ARIA)	2× Platinum	140,000^{‡}
Belgium (BRMA)	Gold	10,000^{‡}
Denmark (IFPI Danmark)	Gold	45,000^{‡}
France (SNEP)	Gold	100,000^{‡}
Germany (BVMI)	Gold	200,000^{‡}
Italy (FIMI)	Gold	25,000^{‡}
New Zealand (RMNZ)	Platinum	30,000^{‡}
Norway (IFPI Norway)	Gold	20,000^{‡}
Poland (ZPAV)	Gold	25,000^{‡}
Sweden (GLF)	Platinum	8,000,000^{†}
United Kingdom (BPI)	Platinum	600,000^{‡}
^{‡} Sales+streaming figures based on certification alone.^{†} Streaming-only figures based on certification alone.
