= Abigail × Ivorian Doll =

Abigail × Ivorian Doll was a musical collaboration between two artists:

- Abigail Asante
- Ivorian Doll
