= LD (rapper) =

British rapper

- Also known as: Scribz; Lil Dice
- Born: Cassiel Nii Akwei Wuta-Ofei; 9 April 1992 (age 34)
- Origin: Brixton Hill, London, England
- Genres: British hip-hop; UK drill; road rap
- Occupations: Rapper; songwriter
- Years active: 2009–present
- Member of: 67

Cassiel Nii Akwei Wuta-Ofei (born 9 April 1992), known professionally as LD and Scribz, is a masked English rapper. Named as the "godfather of UK drill" and as a founding member of the UK drill scene, LD rose to fame in 2014 with the release of his debut single "Live Corn" and the release of "Let's Lurk" alongside 67 in 2016, featuring Giggs.

Wuta-Ofei has been imprisoned twice for two separate criminal convictions. His rapping style often includes heavy, Andante chanting with lyrics inspired by real events in his life and those of his entourage. LD is known for his distinct, powerful vocals and signature mask.

== Early life ==
Cassiel Wuta-Ofei was born in 1992 to Ghanaian parents and was raised by his mother and grandmother. He has three brothers and two sisters.

== Career ==
In 2014, 67 would rise to fame, with Wuta-Ofei – under the alias Scribz – as its frontman. In the same year, he was handed an ASBO, which forbade him from performing in public under the name Scribz; this would result in him changing his alias to LD. In addition, he would start wearing a Phantom of the Opera-style mask, which was discovered in an office during an SB.TV session. In the same year, he would release "Live Corn"; according to Huck, the song "had the wider industry paying attention [to LD] almost instantly".

In September 2018, LD released The Masked One, which spent one week the UK Albums Chart at number 69. Following its release, an article by HotNewHipHop noted that he "contains the image, flow and delivery to become [67's] defining breakout artist". The mixtape was followed in 2021 by Who's Watching. In an interview with VICE, he stated that it was named as such because "you never know who's watching you", also saying that it was his last story of him against the police. He would also release several remixes of his single "Rich Porter" following Brexit; an article by GRM Daily states the remixes were made in order to "keep his musical connections [in the European Union]".

Following his release from prison in late 2021, LD released "First Day Out".

== Criminal convictions ==
In 2014, Wuta-Ofei was issued an ASBO that banned him from making and performing music for two years. Following this, Wuta-Ofei donned a mask and changed his artist name to LD, with his first tune under the new moniker being "Live Corn". In 2016, Wuta-Ofei's ASBO order came to an end, resulting in him releasing a song called "Wicked and Bad", in which he sent for opposing gangs. Within the song, he mentioned that Scribz and LD are the same person. In 2017, Wuta-Ofei was jailed for six months for possession of a knife.

In December 2019, Wuta-Ofei was found guilty of conspiracy to supply Class A drugs (crack cocaine and heroin) and jailed for 4 years and six months. He was released from prison in November 2021.

== Discography ==
=== Mixtapes ===
List of mixtapes, with selected details
Title	Details	Peak chart positions	Certifications
Title	Details	UK	Certifications
All I See Is Smoke (as Scribz)	Released: 2013	—	
6.7 (with Dimzy and Monkey)	Released: 29 January 2015	—	
The Masked One	Released: 20 September 2018; Label: Trakstrs	69	
Who's Watching	Released: 26 February 2021	—	
