= Killing of Chris Kaba =

2022 police shooting in London, England

Death of Chris Kaba
- Date: 5 September 2022
- Location: Kirkstall Gardens, Streatham Hill, London, England; 51.44371°N 0.13007°W
- Type: Shooting
- Deaths: 1 (Chris Kaba)
- Charges: Murder
- Trial: October 2024
- Verdict: Not guilty

Chris Le Messie Kaba was shot dead by a police officer in Streatham Hill, London, England, on 5 September 2022 after a police pursuit.

On the evening of his death, Kaba was driving a car that officers believed was linked to a "firearms incident" the previous day. The police stopped the car, and armed police then approached on foot. Kaba then rammed an unmarked police vehicle. An armed officer fired a single round at Kaba through the car windscreen. Kaba was taken to hospital but died of his injuries the following day. The Independent Office for Police Conduct (IOPC) then began an investigation.

In September 2023, a police officer was charged with murder in regard to Kaba's death. The trial began at the start of October 2024 at the Old Bailey, and returned a not guilty verdict on 21 October.

== Background ==
Kaba was born on 22 July 1998, to parents Prosper Kaba and Helen Lumuanganu. He was raised by his Congolese-French parents alongside his younger brothers at various homes in south east London. Kaba held Congolese and French citizenship from his parents.

Kaba was a member of 67, a Brixton Hill-based drill gang. A 2023 police report classified 67 as the "highest harm street gang in Lambeth". Kaba was known by his stagename Madix or Mad Itch. He had a long history of violent crime with convictions dating back to when he was aged 13 for offences including stabbing with intent to cause grievous bodily harm, a knife-enabled gang assault when the victim was stabbed and had his arm broken, and two other knife offences.

In 2015, when he was 17, Kaba was convicted of affray and possession of an offensive weapon (a belt) over an incident in which a revolver-style handgun was recovered nearby, but the revolver was not linked to him and he was never charged in connection with it.

Kaba had been charged in 2018 with possessing an imitation firearm with intent to cause fear of violence, in relation to an incident on 30 December 2017. He was found guilty at Snaresbrook Crown Court in January 2019, and sentenced to four years in a Young Offenders Institute. He was released in 2020.

In August 2020, Kaba was given a five-month prison sentence for failing to stop and possession of a knife, which was discarded from a vehicle.

In the months following his death, six men were charged with conspiring with Kaba to commit murder and grievous bodily harm; the charges relate to a shooting which took place in Tower Hamlets on 30 August 2022, days before Kaba's death.

=== Shooting of Brandon Malutshi ===
On 30 August 2022, Brandon Malutshi was shot and injured in both legs at the Oval Space nightclub in Hackney. Four men were subsequently accused of plotting with Chris Kaba and a sixth person to murder Malutshi. Four of the accused were tried at the Old Bailey, with two of them – Shemiah Bell and Marcus Pottinger – being found guilty of wounding with intent in February 2024. The two men were, along with Connel Bamgboye, found guilty of possession of a firearm with intent to cause fear of violence. Three other defendants were found not guilty of all charges against them. At the time of the verdict, the BBC reported that the shooting of Malutsi was, "allegedly carried out by another man who died before he could stand trial," and that, "the alleged gunman cannot be identified for legal reasons."

== Shooting ==
On 5 September 2022, according to the IOPC, Kaba was driving an Audi Q8 which was followed by an unmarked police car occupied by armed officers. The IOPC say that the Audi was believed to have been linked to a "firearms incident" the day before and that the police car following did not activate their lights or sirens.

At around 22:07, Kaba made a left turn from New Park Road onto Kirkstall Gardens, Streatham Hill. A marked armed response vehicle was waiting on this road. The police vehicle blocked Kaba's car, and armed police approached on foot. Kaba then rammed his car into an unmarked police vehicle in front, before ramming a police car behind in an attempt to escape. Witnesses said that police vehicles had boxed the car in and that Kaba ignored repeated orders to get out of the vehicle. According to the IOPC, a police officer fired a single round at Kaba through the car's windscreen, striking him. He was taken to a nearby hospital, where he was pronounced dead just after midnight the following day. He was 23 years old at the time.

According to the IOPC, "no non-police firearms were found" either in the car or at the scene. Kaba's family called for a "homicide investigation" into his death and for information about whether any weapons were found.

== Aftermath ==
=== Reaction after shooting ===
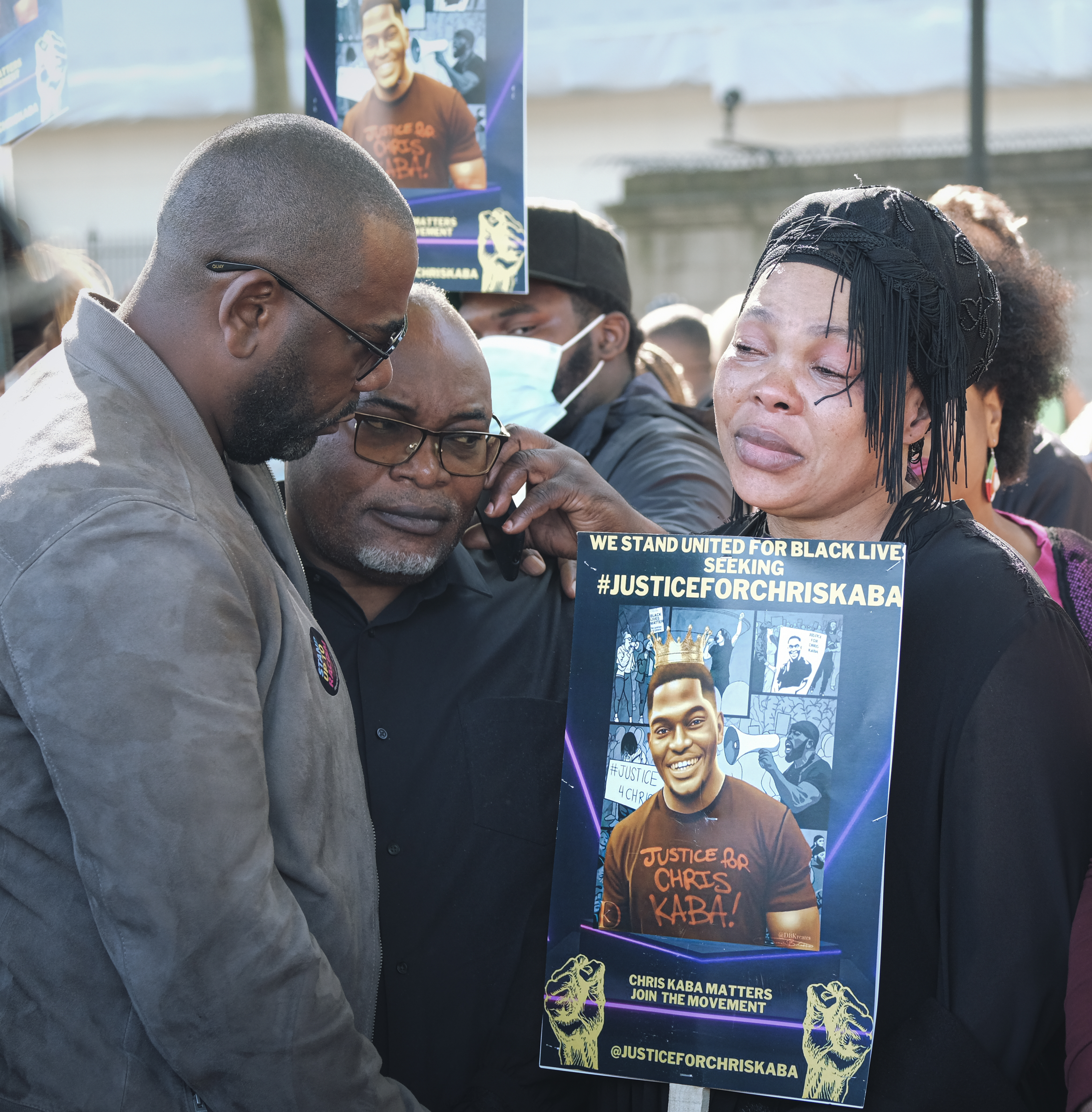
Lee Lawrence (pictured left – whose mother was shot by the police inside their own home in 1985) consoles Chris Kaba's father and mother outside New Scotland Yard in central London.

Charity group Inquest released a statement saying, "dad-to-be Chris' loved ones said they are worried his life was cut short due to his skin colour."

In response to the shooting, about 40 protesters gathered outside Brixton police station on 8 September 2022, seeking recrimination for Kaba's death. Further protests took place outside New Scotland Yard in which over 300 people, including former Leader of the Opposition Jeremy Corbyn, attended.

On 21 September the family of the deceased viewed police body-cam footage of the incident. Following this, the family decided to take a step back from campaigning, but expressed that they now wanted justice.

=== Prosecution of firearms officer ===
On 20 September 2023, the Crown Prosecution Service announced that it had authorised the charging of a Metropolitan Police ("Met") officer with murder in relation to the death. The police officer, Sgt. Martyn Blake, was referred to as "NX121" before his identity was revealed. Blake appeared before Westminster Magistrates' Court on the morning of 21 September, and then at the Old Bailey in the afternoon of the same day. He was granted bail with the conditions that he "lives at a named address, surrenders his passport and does not apply for international travel documents".

In response to the charge, by the morning of 25 September up to 300 of the more than 2,500 Metropolitan Police authorised firearms officers had returned their permits over concerns of the decision to prosecute. The Met said many of the officers resumed their armed duties later that afternoon.

A plea and trial preparation hearing was to take place on 1 December 2023; a preliminary date for the trial to begin was set for 9 September 2024. Having originally been granted anonymity with the pseudonym of NX121, Judge Mark Lucraft ruled that Blake would be named on 1 March 2024. The judge stated "In my judgment, the naming of the defendant, or the giving of his date of birth, does not give rise to a real and immediate risk to his life." It was subsequently disclosed that the '67 Gang' had offered a reward of £10,000 to anybody prepared to kill the officer who, along with his entire family, had to go into hiding since the public disclosure.

On 8 March 2024, Blake appeared at the Old Bailey to enter his plea of not guilty, during which he confirmed his name and age. He was once more granted bail until the commencement of his trial.

=== Trial and verdict ===
On 2 October 2024, the trial began at the Old Bailey before Mr Justice Goss. Three weeks later on 21 October, the police officer was found not guilty by the jury after under 3 hours of deliberation.

Following the trial, reporting restrictions were lifted regarding Kaba's criminal history. Kaba's family opposed the lifting of all of these restrictions; however, the Metropolitan Police won a legal case to lift the ban on revealing Kaba's history. It was revealed that he was the alleged gunman in a nightclub shooting six days before his death and had been issued with a 28-day domestic violence protection order which barred him from contacting the mother of his unborn child. The information about Kaba's past had been restricted due to the judge deeming it not relevant, as it was not known to Blake at the time. The police did not know who was driving the Audi Q8, but had information linking it to a firearms incident the prior night. It also emerged that on the night of his death, Kaba had taken cocaine, still had gunshot residue on his sleeve, which was believed to be from a shooting in Brixton the night before, and had a balaclava in the car.

Following the trial verdict, the Metropolitan Police Federation stated that Blake should "never have stood trial".

=== Misconduct hearing ===
On 30 April 2025, the Independent Office for Police Conduct (IOPC) announced that their investigation had concluded that there was evidence that Sergeant Martyn Blake "may have breached the police professional standards regarding his use of force". Blake faced a gross misconduct hearing. The IOPC decision received negative reaction from members of the Metropolitan police: Assistant Commissioner Laurence Taylor argued that Blake should not receive further investigation as he had been found not guilty by a jury, and the general secretary of the Metropolitan Police Federation described it as a "nonsensical ruling".

On 08 July 2026, the IOPC said the police marksman who shot Chris Kaba should no longer face misconduct proceedings after the government changed the rules on how officers' use of force is judged. On 5th August, the IOPC announced that that misconduct proceedings against Blake would not take place.
