= Loski =

British rapper & singer (born 1999)

- Also known as: Big Skii; Loski Loose; Lil' Nizzy; Jumz
- Born: Jyrelle Justin O'Connor; 6 May 1999 (age 27); Kennington, London, England
- Genres: British hip hop; UK drill; afroswing
- Occupations: Rapper; singer; songwriter
- Years active: 2012–present
- Label: Since '93 (distributed by Sony Music)
- Member of: Harlem Spartans
- Website: loskiofficial.com
- Criminal information
- Status: incarcerated
- Conviction: Criminal possession of a weapon
- Penalty: 2023: 7 years 2025: ?

Details
- Date apprehended: January 5, 2023; July 16, 2025

Jyrelle Justin O'Connor (born 6 May 1999), known professionally as Loski (formerly Lil' Nizzy), is an English rapper and singer from Kennington, London. He is part of the Kennington-based UK drill group Harlem Spartans.

Loski began his career in 2012 under the name Lil' Nizzy. In 2016, under his current moniker, he released his breakout singles "Hazards" and "DJ Khaled", both of which became underground hits.

On 13 April 2018, he released his debut mixtape, Call Me Loose, and on 1 March 2019, he released his second mixtape, Mad Move. In 2020, Loski released his long-awaited debut studio album, Music, Trial & Trauma: A Drill Story. On 15 October 2021, he released a 10-song EP titled, Censored EP and on 30 June 2023, he released his fifth project titled, See You At The Gates, after being sentenced to 7 years in prison for possessing a loaded revolver. He was released on 1 October 2024.

== Early life ==
Jyrelle Justin O'Connor was born in Kennington, London on 6 May 1999. His father was Ty Nizzy, a member of the PDC rap group and "an originator of road rap", according to The Guardian. His mother, Dionne Greenland, studied English literature and history while attending university, which Loski said inspired storytelling within his songs. O'Connor said in an interview with VICE that both of his parents supported him in pursuing a musical career.

O'Connor moved from Kennington to Borehamwood to live with his grandmother at the age of 12 following a group of boys putting a gun to his head. He attended Hertswood Academy. In 2013, he was reported as missing from his house.

== Career ==
During O'Connor's early musical career, he went under the name Lil' Nizzy, in reference to his father, Ty Nizzy. He released a song alongside Danks in 2012.

Under the name Loski, he released his breakout single "Hazards" in 2016. Other early songs included "Money and Beef", "DJ Khaled", and "Teddy Bruckshot".

In March 2018, Loski was signed to Sony Music Entertainment. The following month, he released his debut mixtape Call Me Loose, which peaked at number 44 on the UK Albums Chart and was named as one of the inspirations for Scorpion by Drake. In an article with MTV, Loski stated that the mixtape was about "the neighbourhood, friends, everything growing up." The following year, he released the mixtape Mad Move, which peaked at number 41. An article in Versus noted that the mixtape "sees the south Londoner plant himself firmly at the fore of the genre."

In 2020, Loski released his debut album, Music, Trial & Trauma: A Drill Story, which peaked at number 39 on the UK Albums Chart and was noted as being "several albums at once." Robert Kazandjian, writing for Clash, stated that the album was divided into three acts, with the album as a whole mainly centered around legal issues.

In September 2021, Loski announced his debut EP, Censored. The EP was released on 15 October; an article in Trench noted that "although the extensive cast of producers keep the Censored's sound close to Loski's drill roots, the rapper's evolution is laid bare as he attacks each track with an effortless display of lyrical greaze."

He jointly holds the record for most top 75 hits in the UK without having a top 40 hit with fellow British rapper Unknown T.

== Criminal convictions ==
In 2015, when O'Connor was 15 years old, he was convicted of possession of a sawn-off shotgun. In 2016, O'Connor was sentenced to prison after being found in possession of a knife. He was released in 2017.

On 9 April 2019, he was stopped by police while travelling to Willesden, who found him in possession of a revolver. O'Connor was charged with possession of a firearm, intent to endanger life, and possession of ammunition as a result. His first trial resulted in a retrial as a result of his prosecutor falling ill, while the second resulted in a hung jury. He was ultimately found guilty of possessing a prohibited firearm on 5 January 2023, and was sentenced to 7 years in prison. O'Connor was released on 30 September 2024.

== Discography ==
=== Studio albums ===
List of albums, with selected details
Title	Details	Peak chart positions
Title	Details	UK
Music, Trial & Trauma: A Drill Story	Released: 20 November 2020; Label: Since '93; Format: CD, streaming, digital download	39

=== Mixtapes ===
List of mixtapes, with selected details
Title	Details	Peak chart positions
Title	Details	UK
Call Me Loose	Released: 13 April 2018; Label: Since '93; Format: Streaming, digital download	44
Mad Move	Released: 1 March 2019; Label: Since '93; Format: Streaming, digital download	41
See You At The Gates	Released: 30 June 2023; Label: Loski; Format: Streaming, digital download	—

=== EPs ===
List of EPs, with selected details
Title	Details	Peak chart positions
Title	Details	UK
Censored	Released: 15 October 2021; Label: Since '93; Format: Streaming, digital download	—

=== Singles ===
==== As lead artist ====
List of singles, with year released, selected chart positions and certifications, and album name shown
Title	Year	Peak chart positions	Certifications	Album
Title	Year	UK	Certifications	Album
"Teddy Bruckshot"	2017	—		Call Me Loose
"Money & Beef"	2017	—		Call Me Loose
"Mummy's Kitchen" (featuring Mayski)	2017	—		Non-album single
"Cool Kid"	2018	—		Call Me Loose
"Forrest Gump"	2018	88	BPI: Silver	Call Me Loose
"Mad About Bars" (with Kenny Allstar)	2018	—		Non-album singles
"Calm Down"	2018	—		Non-album singles
"Boasy"	2019	—		Mad Move
"No Cap" (with DigDat)	2019	51		Mad Move
"Hazards 2.0"	2019	—		Mad Move
"Ghost"	2020	—		Non-album singles
"Allegedly"	2020	65		Non-album singles
"Slay"	2020	—		Non-album singles
"Training Day" (with MoStack)	2020	75		Non-album singles
"On Me" (with MizOrMac)	2020	57		Music, Trial & Trauma: A Drill Story
"Daily Duppy"	2020	—		Non-album single
"Anglo Saxon" (featuring Blanco)	2020	—		Music, Trial & Trauma: A Drill Story
"Avengers" (featuring Popcaan)	2020	—		Music, Trial & Trauma: A Drill Story
"Flavour" (featuring Stormzy)	2020	43		Music, Trial & Trauma: A Drill Story
"P.U.G"	2021	87		Censored
"Rolling Dice"	2021	81		Censored
"Tag Team"	2022	—		Non-album singles
"Obsessed"	2022	—		Non-album singles
"G Lock"	2022	—		Non-album singles

==== As featured artist ====
List of singles, with year released, selected chart positions and certifications, and album name shown
Title	Year	Peak chart positions	Certifications	Album
Title	Year	UK	Certifications	Album
"Dues" (Headie One featuring Loski)	2018	—		The One
"Rusty" (Lavida Loca featuring Loski)	2018	—		Just B' Coz
"R.I.P" (Ms Banks featuring Loski)	2018	—		The Coldest Winter Ever
"Ugly Faces" (Smoke Boys and Swift featuring Loski)	2018	—		Swiftionary
"2 and a Shoe" (Smoke Boys and Swift featuring Loski, Dimzy, Deepee and RV)	2018	—		Swiftionary
"Gang Mode" (CS featuring Loski)	2019	—		Everyone Hates Chris
"Trust" (The Plug featuring Nafe Smallz, YoungBoy Never Broke Again and Loski)	2019	—		Plug Talk
"Go N Get It" (Lil Berete featuring Loski)	2019	—		1 Way Out
"Stop Lying" (Woosh featuring Loski)	2019	—		Gang Unit
"Flexin" (Mowgs featuring Loski)	2019	—		Roll the Dice
"Tee" (Jay1 featuring Loski)	2020	65		Non-album single
"Chop My Money" (iLL BLU featuring Krept and Konan and Loski)	2021	64	BPI: Silver	The BLUPRINT
"Bad Guy" (Morrisson featuring Loski)	2021	—		Guilty
"Sorry Not Sorry" (Bandokay and Double Lz featuring Loski)	2021	—		Drill Commandments
"Cerberus" (Blanco featuring K-Trap and Loski)	2021	—		City of God

== Awards and nominations ==
Year	Award	Nominated work	Category	Result	Ref.
2018	GRM Daily Rated Awards	Himself	Breakthrough of the Year	Nominated	
2018	GRM Daily Rated Awards	Call Me Loose	Mixtape of the Year	Nominated	
2020	MOBO Awards	Himself	Best Newcomer	Nominated	
2021	MOBO Awards	Himself	Best Drill Act	Nominated	
2021	GRM Daily Rated Awards	Music, Trial & Trauma: A Drill Story	Album of the Year	Nominated	
2022	Urban Music Awards	Music, Trial & Trauma: A Drill Story	Album of the Year	Nominated	
