= Kwengface =

British rapper

- Also known as: Narsty, Kweng Fizzy
- Born: Ninian Martin Agyemang Fosu; 24 June 1998 (age 27)
- Origin: Peckham, London, England
- Genres: UK drill
- Occupation: Rapper
- Years active: 2015–present
- Member of: Zone 2

Ninian Martin Agyemang Fosu (born 24 June 1998), known professionally as Kwengface and formerly known as Narsty, is a British drill rapper. He began his rap career in 2015 as part of the Peckham-based Zone 2 collective. He released his debut solo mixtape, YPB: Tha Come Up, in 2021.

== Career ==
Kwengface began rapping in 2015 as a member of the Zone 2 collective, based in Peckham. In 2020, Kwengface released "Auntie", which peaked at number 49 on the UK singles chart. In 2021, Kwengface released "Petrol Station" with PS Hitsquad, which peaked at number 19 on the UK singles chart. Later that same year, he released a Plugged In freestyle with Fumez the Engineer in 2021 – which was viewed over 7.5 million times according to DJ Mag – and his debut solo mixtape, YPB: Tha Come Up, which included features from Big Ryde, Berna, and PS Hitsquad.

In 2022, Kwengface released his second mixtape, YPB: The Archive, with features from Dizzee Rascal, Dusty Locane, 26AR, and CB. He also released "Lucious" with Knucks, which peaked at number 44 on the UK singles chart. In 2023, Kwengface released The Memoir, a mixtape that included features from Giggs, Knucks, ShaSimone and SL.

In 2024, Kwengface released A Gangster's Holiday. The mixtape included features from Digga D, Marnz Malone, and Booter Bee. The mixtape was named on British GQ's top best albums of 2024, with the magazine stating, "A Gangster’s Holiday is more old-school – it’s all clicking snares and sinister talk of gang violence."

== Discography ==
=== Mixtapes ===
List of mixtapes, with selected details
Title	Details
YPB: Tha Come Up	Released: 13 August 2021; Label: EMPIRE; Format: Streaming, digital download
YPB: The Archive	Released: 27 May 2022; Label: EMPIRE; Format: Streaming, digital download
The Memoir	Released: 14 April 2023; Label: Kwengface LTD; Format: Streaming, digital download
A Gangster's Holiday	Released: 15 November 2024; Label: Kwengface LTD; Format: Streaming, digital download

=== Charted singles ===
List of charted singles, with year released and selected chart positions
Title	Year	Peak chart positions
Title	Year	UK
"Auntie"	2020	49
"Petrol Station" (with PS Hitsquad)	2021	19
"Lucious" (with Knucks)	2022	44
