= Michael Dapaah =

British actor, rapper, and comedian (born 1991)

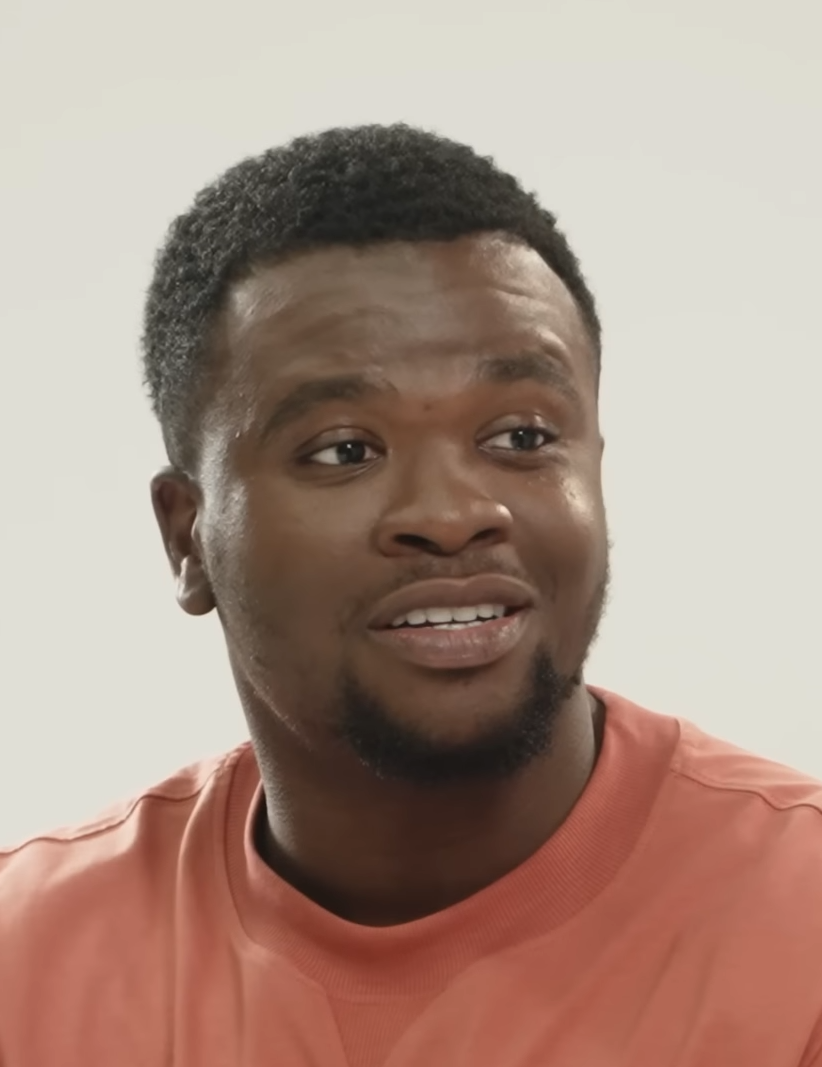
- Dapaah in 2023
- Born: 10 August 1991 (age 35); Croydon, London, England
- Education: Brunel University of London; National Youth Theatre
- Occupations: Actor; comedian; rapper
- Years active: 2014–present
- Musical career
- Also known as: Big Shaq; Roadman Shaq; MC Quakez; Dr Ofori
- Genres: Comedy hip hop; comedy music; UK drill
- Labels: Bagel King; Whitewall; Island
- Notable work: "Man's Not Hot"

Comedy career
- Genres: Musical comedy; mockumentary

Michael Dapaah (born 10 August 1991) is a British actor, rapper, and comedian best known for portraying the fictional rapper Big Shaq (also known as Roadman Shaq). He is also known for his mockumentary SWIL (Somewhere in London), which focuses on four characters and their journey to success.

== Early life ==
Michael Dapaah was born in 1991 in Croydon, south London, to first-generation Ghanaian immigrants. While he was growing up, his parents wanted him to study science in order to become a doctor, but he was never interested in the subject, instead being more interested in acting and comedy. He also spent time in South Africa as a child. For a time he was in prison. He studied film, acting and theatre at Brunel University and took a course from the National Youth Theatre.

== Career ==
Dapaah began his career by garnering a social following among the British-African community for his brief comedic parts in shows like Meet the Adebanjos, which deals with a Nigerian family in London.

In May 2017 along with friend and fellow Brunel graduate Marv Brown, he launched a mockumentary series on YouTube titled SWIL (Somewhere in London) which amassed over 1 million views in its first series. In this series he created the characters MC Quakez and Big Shaq.

In 2020, Michael Dapaah started making the move to a fitness show called "Belly Must Go".

=== "Man's Not Hot" ===
Dapaah saw a rapid growth in public attention when he appeared on Charlie Sloth's BBC Radio 1Xtra show "Fire in the Booth". His comedic rap "Man's Not Hot" (whose backing track was sampled from 67 and Giggs' 2016 track "Let's Lurk") developed into a viral meme, and a studio track version of the song was released on 22 September 2017. The song's music video was released by Dapaah himself on 26 October of the same year; which features cameos from Waka Flocka Flame, Lil Yachty, Dutch rap-group Broederliefde and DJ Khaled, who calls Dapaah's character a "legend".

== Discography ==
=== Singles ===
==== As lead artist ====
Title	Year	Peak chart positions										Certifications	Album
Title	Year	UK	AUS	AUT	DEN	GER	NL	NOR	NZ	SWE	SWI	Certifications	Album
"Balance" (as MC Quakez; featuring Shakes)	2017	—	—	—	—	—	—	—	—	—	—		Non-album singles
"Man's Not Hot" (as Big Shaq)	2017	3	28	33	21	26	20	23	22	15	41	BPI: Platinum; BEA: Gold; ARIA: 2× Platinum; BVMI: Gold; IFPI: Gold; GLF: Platinum; RMNZ: Platinum	Non-album singles
"Man Don't Dance" (as Big Shaq)	2018	78	—	—	—	—	—	—	—	—	—		Non-album singles
"Daily Duppy" (as Big Shaq; featuring GRM Daily)	2018	—	—	—	—	—	—	—	—	—	—		Non-album singles
"Buss It Down" (as Big Shaq)	2019	—	—	—	—	—	—	—	—	—	—		Non-album singles
"Chicken Shop Freestyle" (as Big Shaq)	2020	—	—	—	—	—	—	—	—	—	—		Non-album singles
"Like Wot!" (as Big Shaq)	2024	?											Non-album singles
"lock in" (as Big Shaq)	2024	?											Non-album singles
"—" denotes a single that did not chart or was not released in that territory.

==== As featured artist ====
Title	Year	Album
"The Ting Go Challenge" (DJ Flex featuring MC Quakez)	2017	Non-album single

== See also ==
- List of British comedians
- Munya Chawawa
- Mo Gilligan
