= What Do You Call It? From Grassroots to the Golden Era of UK Rap =

2024 non-fiction book on the history of UK rap

- Author: David Kane
- Cover artist: Trevor Jackson
- Language: English
- Genre: Non-fiction; music; cultural history
- Publisher: Velocity Press
- Publication date: 2024
- Publication place: United Kingdom
- Pages: 304
- ISBN: 978-1-913231-61-3

What Do You Call It? From Grassroots to the Golden Era of UK Rap is a 2024 non-fiction book by British writer and editor David Kane, published by Velocity Press. The book documents the evolution of UK rap from its underground beginnings through the rise of grime and drill, tracing how artists, communities, and public institutions shaped the genre's development.

== Background ==
The idea for What Do You Call It? grew from David Kane's long-standing involvement in UK music journalism and his observation that the history of British rap is often underrepresented or mischaracterised. In an interview with DJ Mag, Kane discussed the motivations behind the book and its historical scope, stating that he aimed to “highlight some lesser-known stories and how they relate to the bigger picture for UK rap music,” while noting that the culture “goes much further back than grime.”

Published by Velocity Press in December 2024, the book explores how UK rap evolved from early hip hop and Britcore to garage, grime, and drill, shaped by sound system and rave culture as well as the country's wider social and political context. Drawing on first-hand interviews with artists, producers, and industry figures, Kane combines historical research with cultural analysis to show how British rap developed its own identity through regional expression, DIY networks, and creative resistance.

Kane has been cited by The Times in broader discussions of female emcees in British rap culture, where he was referenced as the author of What Do You Call It? From Grassroots to the Golden Era of UK Rap.

== Reception ==
What Do You Call It? From Grassroots to the Golden Era of UK Rap received reviews from British and international music publications. In a review for The Wire, Ginger Slim praised the book's depth and range, writing that “again and again, the rich variety of sounds found within the sprawling landscape of UK rap is highlighted, delivered with a passion and understanding that could only come from a true student of the culture,” while also noting that certain key record labels received comparatively limited coverage.

Mojo awarded the book four stars, describing it as “a brilliant unraveling of the complex relationship between hip-hop and its offshoots (UK garage, grime, drill) amid resistance from the mainstream, all delivered with mathematical precision and a genuine fan’s warmth,” and calling it “a landmark tome for UK rap music.”

American music magazine Wax Poetics similarly praised the book for its scope and cultural analysis, highlighting Kane's ability to “build bridges in a rich musical universe full of heroes and villains — and plot twists.”

== Cover art ==
The book's cover was designed by Trevor Jackson. Two editions of the cover are available: one with silver foil and one with a matte finish.

In an interview with Kane, Jackson explained his design philosophy: “I wanted to create something which wasn’t a cliché. When I had my own label it was important to try to do something innovative because hip-hop is normally full of clichés. I wanted to do something which was intelligent. As much as I’m happy to see how UK hip-hop has grown, I’m also disappointed that the vast majority is so base level — sex, money and violence is really boring. Because for me, rap is one of the most important creative cultures I’ve experienced in my life and I wanted to convey it in a smart and innovative way. I tried to strike a happy medium between something dynamic and something that has a deeper meaning.”

== Bibliographic information ==
- Author: David Kane
- Publisher: Velocity Press
- Publication date: 2024
- ISBN 978-1-913231-61-3
- Language: English
- Country: United Kingdom
