= Abigail Asante =

British rapper (born 1997)

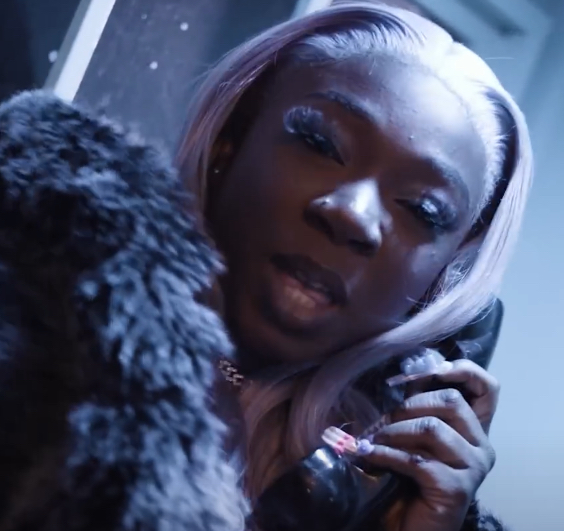
- Asante in 2023

Background information
- Born: Abigail Burland; 11 September 1997 (age 28)
- Genres: British hip hop; UK drill; afrobeats
- Occupations: Rapper; dancer; internet personality
- Instruments: Vocals
- Years active: 2018–present
- Label: Moves Recordings

YouTube information
- Channel: ABIGAIL ASANTE
- Subscribers: 15.40 thousand
- Views: 919.46 thousand
- Last updated: 10 Jul 2022

Abigail Burland (born 11 September 1997), known professionally as Abigail Asante, is a British rapper, dancer, and internet personality. She initially gained prominence through dance videos she posted to Instagram and blocking major roads to shoot music videos. She made her music debut in collaboration with Ivorian Doll, releasing singles under the name Abigail × Ivorian Doll.

Asante now performs as a solo act. She has since released her own solo singles, including "Stupid" and "Liar", and "Bad Gyal Bounce", a collaboration with Brixx.
