= Ivorian Doll =

British rapper and Internet personality

- Born: Vanessa Mahi; 17 December 1997 (age 28); Flensburg, Schleswig-Holstein, Germany
- Origin: London, England
- Genres: British hip hop; UK drill
- Occupations: Rapper; internet personality
- Years active: 2017–present

Vanessa Mahi (born 17 December 1997), known professionally as Ivorian Doll, is a British-German rapper and internet personality of Ivorian descent. She made her debut in collaboration with Abigail Asante, releasing singles under the name Abigail x Ivorian Doll. She has since gone on to release several singles as a solo artist.

== Early life ==
Mahi was born in Flensburg, Germany to parents from the Ivory Coast and moved to East London when she was three years old with her father. Her mother initially stayed in Germany, later joining the family when Mahi was a teenager and her parents reunited. Her pseudonym refers to her Ivorian heritage. Mahi's father is a pastor. He took her to acting classes from the age of 11. She attended Haggerston School.

== Career ==
Before starting her music career, Mahi was a YouTuber. Mahi describes herself as having gone into a rap career "accidentally".

After making her musical debut collaborating with Abigail Asante, Mahi began releasing music as a solo performer in late 2019. Her debut single was "Queen of Drill".

She released her breakout track, "Rumours", in April 2020. The music video for the track on YouTube reached a million views within a month.

Mahi was nominated for Best Newcomer in the 2020 MOBO Awards.

In December 2020, Birmingham rapper Lady Leshurr released a diss track about Mahi, "DIV". Mahi was announced as part of the Wireless Festival 2021 lineup in April 2021. She also performed at Reading Festival 2021.

In 2021, she collaborated with Birmingham's Duran Duran on the track "Hammerhead" for their album Future Past, released in October 2021.

== Artistry ==
Mahi has described Nicki Minaj, Lil' Kim and Foxy Brown as musical influences.

== Discography ==
=== Singles ===
==== As lead artist ====
List of singles as lead artist, with selected details
Title	Year	Album
"Queen of Drill (QOD)"	2019	Non-album singles
"Rumours"	2020	Non-album singles
"Body Bag"	2020	Non-album singles
"Daily Duppy"	2020	Non-album singles
"Clout"	2020	Non-album singles
"Boss"	2022	Non-album singles
"Bow Down"	2022	Non-album singles
"Big Booty"	2022	Non-album singles
"Messy"	2022	Non-album singles
"Petty"	2022	Non-album singles
"Big Bad IVD"	2023	Non-album singles
"Diss to Dillon"	2023	Non-album singles
"3AM (From The Block Freestyle)"	2024	Non-album singles
"Bulletproof"	2024	Non-album singles
"HB Freestyle (Season 6)"	2024	Non-album singles
"9JA FREESTYLE"	2024	Non-album singles
"In The Booth"	2024	Non-album singles

==== As featured artist ====
List of singles as featured artist, with selected details
Title	Year	Album
"The Situation" (Abigail Asante with Ivorian Doll)	2019	Non-album singles
"Bouji" (AB feat. Ivorian Doll)	2019	Non-album singles
"Bezerk" (Br3nya with Ivorian Doll)	2020	Non-album singles
"Dumb Flex (Remix)" (Miss Lafamilia featuring Ivorian Doll, A9bdo Fundz, Offica, and Poundz)	2021	Non-album singles
"WTF" (Tanya with Ivorian Doll)	2021	Non-album singles
"Sad Party" (solo or acoustic by KAMILLE featuring Haile and Ivorian Doll)	2021	Non-album singles
"Victory (My Destiny)" (Tokio Myers featuring Ivorian Doll)	2021	Non-album singles
"Faded [Remix]" (B1 featuring 22Gz, Ivorian Doll, and Dezzie)	2021	Non-album singles
"Holy F4k" (Smallgod featuring Ivorian Doll, Vic Mensa, Black Sherif, Kwaku DMC)	2021	Non-album singles
"Hot" (Stepz with Ivorian Doll)	2023	Non-album singles
"Plenty Plenty" (Steel Banglez featuring S1mba, Midas the Jagaban, and Ivorian Doll)	2023	Non-album singles
"Money Come (Remix)" (Iggy Azelea featuring Ivorian Doll and Big Boss Vette)	2023	Non-album singles
