= 67 (group) =

British rap group and gang

- Also known as: 674; OSG
- Origin: Brixton Hill, London, England
- Genres: British hip-hop; UK drill; road rap
- Years active: 2012–present
- Label: 6ix 7even
- Members: See list
- Website: 6ix7even.com

67 (pronounced six-seven) are a British music group and street gang in the UK drill scene originally composed of members LD, Monkey, Dimzy, Liquez, ASAP and SJ.

Having gained notoriety following the police shooting of Chris Kaba, the group has been labelled a criminal gang by the Metropolitan Police, and had several shows shut down using the controversial Form 696, including their first UK tour after it sold out.

== History ==
67 formed in Brixton Hill, South London, and rose to fame in 2014. They are known as one of the early adopters of the UK drill sound, being the first group to gain mainstream popularity. They are best known for their 2016 track "Let's Lurk" featuring Giggs, whose instrumental was used by Big Shaq in his 2017 parody track "Man's Not Hot". They saw chart success again in 2017, when the mixtape The Glorious Twelfth peaked at 71 on the official charts.

== Members ==
The list below includes confirmed gang members of 67.

=== Current gang members ===
- AK (Abdul Hakeem Yusuf)
- ASAP (Malki Martin)
- Brucka (or BruckSav)
- C Rose (Connel Bamgboye)
- Ching/Hoopz/Young MSkrilly
- Claimar (aka CL)
- LAG (Lewis Alexander Gosling) (aka grippa)
- Dimzy (Steven Mubama)
- Doggy
- dopesmoke (Shakur Dixon-Kenton)
- G.Y (also known as Graveyard)
- Ghost (aka GH)
- Giant
- Kizzy
- LD (Cassiel Wuta-Ofei; or Scribz)
- Liquez (Melique Garraway)
- Lojo (also known as LJ)
- MSkeng
- MA/Mskrilly
- Mally
- Marrow
- Mischief (aka Misch Mash, Misch)
- Monkey (Lloyd Acheampong)
- PR SAD (aka PR, Pulla, real name Andre Fleming)
- OakDark
- Papi
- RoddyGunzz (aka Roddygunnaz) – Former TikToker
- Rocko (aka Rocco) – Former 86 member
- R6 (Mohammed Jalloh)
- Silent
- 67 Sj (Joshua Amon)
- Skrr
- Smallz (Ehsan Saleh)
- Smoski
- Snoopy
- Ssav
- Squeezy
- ST (Siratillah Ford)
- Suske
- Trapap
- VD (Zeshaun Daley)
- Y.SJ
- Young Scribz

=== Former members ===
- Itch / Maddix real name Chris Kaba: died after being shot by a Metropolitan Police officer, while attempting to escape a road block.

== Criminal background ==
=== Ban from music ===
In 2014, Scribz was issued an ASBO that banned him from making and performing music for two years. Following this, Scribz began wearing a mask to conceal his identity and took on the alias LD, with his first song as LD being "Live Corn". After his ASBO came to an end in 2016, he released "Wicked and Bad" as Scrib, in which he sent for opposing gangs and revealed that he was LD. In 2017, he was imprisoned for possession of a knife. The group has been labelled a "criminal gang" by the police, and had their first UK tour shut down. In July 2018, Dimzy shared an open letter accusing the police and media of "scapegoating" their music.

=== Drug trafficking ===
In 2018, 67 was identified as running five county lines to neighbouring counties; 16 affiliates of the group were arrested in July 2019 and sentenced to a total of 61 years. In 2019, LD (Scribz) and ASAP were jailed for 4.5 years each for their involvement in county lines drug dealing; LD was released in November 2021.

=== Murder of rival drill group member ===
On 25 February 2015, a member of the drill group and street gang, 150, Dwayne Simpson aka SQ, was stabbed to death by a member of 67 over a gang dispute.

=== Murder of Cheyon Evans ===
On 14 June 2019, 21-year-old named Fernando Pope, aka Giant/G.I., stabbed 18-year-old Cheyon Evans to death. Cheyon Evans was known as 'Stompz' and allegedly was a part of the 37/OJB gang, with him also having ties to the CT gang based in Clapham, one of 67's main rivals. Giant was convicted of the murder on 6 January 2020 and was given the mandatory life sentence, with a minimum tariff of 25 years.

=== Murder of Yousef Beker ===
On 10 September 2019, a group of six men, aged between 16 and 20, were involved in a confrontation with another group, including Yousef, near the KFC branch on Edgware Road. The conflict escalated into a fight, in which 17-year-old Yousef Beker was stabbed in the chest. He was taken to St. Mary's hospital, where he later died from the injuries sustained. After a delay due to the COVID-19 pandemic, a trial concluded on 13 July 2020. During the trial, 19-year-old Zeshaun Daley, a member of 67 also known as VD, and a 17-year-old were convicted of murder and possession of an offensive weapon. Daley was given a life sentence with a minimum of 19 years. Another 17-year-old was convicted of manslaughter.

The remaining three defendants—Shakur Dixon-Kenton, also known as Dopesmoke/Dopey, a 20-year-old member of 67, and two boys aged 17 and 16 were cleared of involvement.

=== Shooting of Brandon Malutshi ===
On 30 August 2022, Brandon Malutshi was shot and injured in Tower Hamlets. Shemiah Bell, Hamza Abdi, Connel Bamgboye, Simeon Glasgow, Marcus Pottinger, Carl Tagoe, and Chris Kaba were accused of conspiring to commit murder and to cause grievous bodily harm. Four of the accused were tried, with two of them - Shemiah Bell and Marcus Pottinger - found guilty of wounding with intent at the Old Bailey in February 2024, and sentenced to 10 years and 9 years imprisonment respectively. The two men were, along with Connel Bamgboye, convicted of possession of a firearm with intent to cause fear of violence, and Bamgboye was sentenced to 5 years and 6 months imprisonment. The three other defendants were acquitted of all charges against them. At the time of the verdict, the BBC reported that the shooting of Malutshi was "allegedly carried out by another man who died before he could stand trial," and that" the alleged gunman cannot be identified for legal reasons." Following the acquittal of the police officer who shot Chris Kaba on 21 October 2024, reporting restrictions were lifted and it was announced that Chris Kaba was named as the gunman who shot Brandon Malutshi.

=== Shooting of Chris Kaba ===
On 5 September 2022, 24-year-old Chris Kaba was shot dead by a police officer in Kirkstall Gardens, Streatham Hill, London, England. The officer responsible was subsequently acquitted of murder. It was subsequently disclosed that the '67 Gang had offered a reward of £10,000 to anybody prepared to kill the officer who, along with his entire family, had to go into hiding since the public disclosure.

== Awards and nominations ==
- Nominated for Best Newcomer at the 2016 MOBO Awards.

== Discography ==
=== Mixtapes ===
- Dimzy - A Glass of Water (2013)
- LD, Monkey, Dimzy - 6.7 (2015)
- In Skengs We Trust (2015)
- Let's Lurk (2016)
- Glorious Twelfth (2017)
- The 6 (2018)
- Dimzy - Dim The Lights (2018)
- Monkey -Wild N Loose (2019)
- R6 & ST - Search & Destroy (2018)
- Quarantined (2020)
- Liquez - Released Under Investigation (2020)
- Dimzy - A Glass of Water 2 (2021)
- dopesmoke & Silent - Hillside (2021)

=== EPs ===
- Dimzy and Swift - Smoke and Water (2022)
