= Elayne Harrington =

Irish hip hop musician and artist

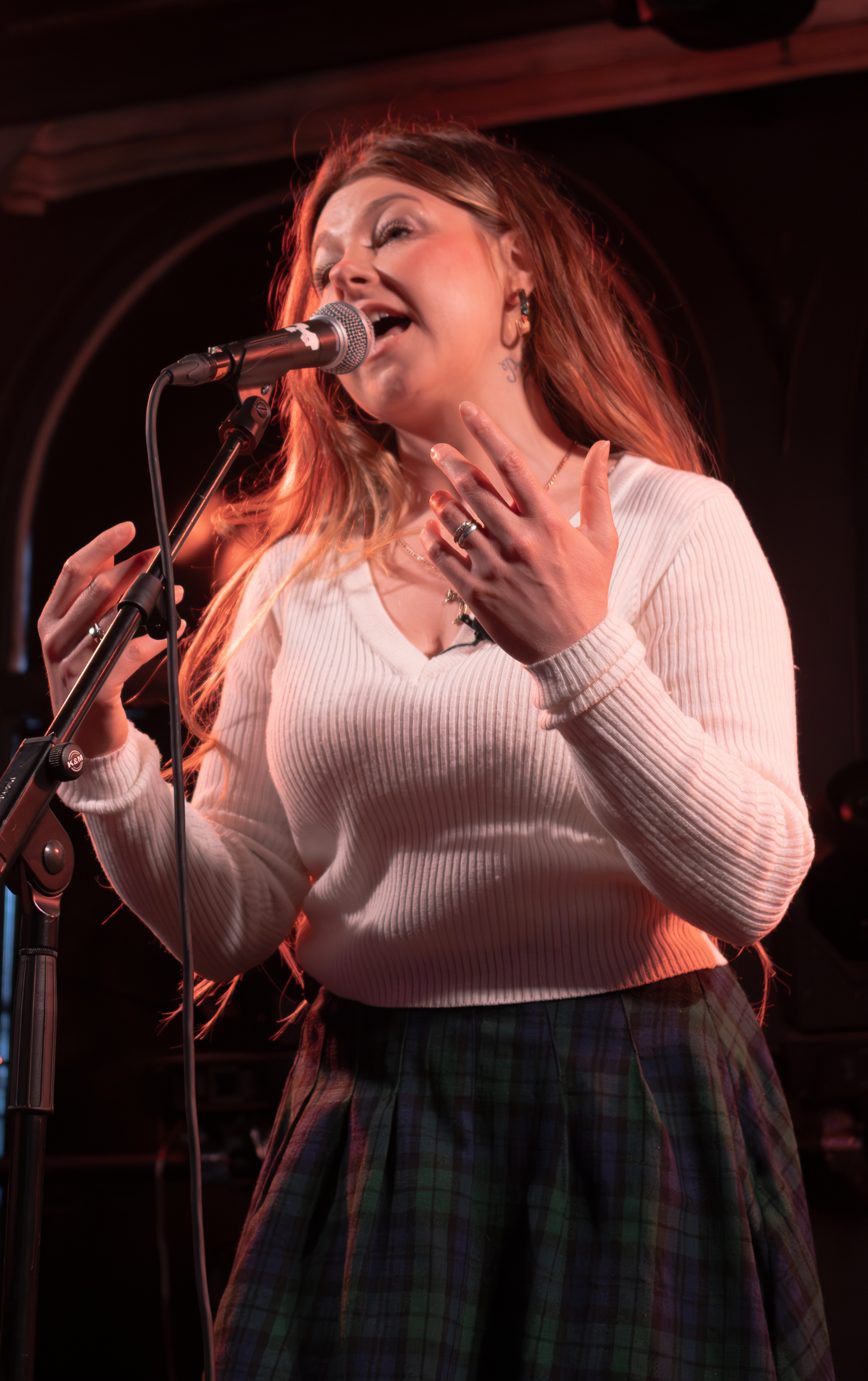
- Elayne Harrington in 2024
- Born: 1987 or 1988 (age 38–39); Finglas, Dublin, Ireland
- Other name: Temper-Mental MissElayneous
- Occupations: Poet, rapper, sculptor
- Musical career
- Genres: Spoken word, hip-hop
- Instruments: Vocals, bodhrán
- Website: Official website

Elayne Adamczyk Harrington, also known as Temper-Mental MissElayneous, is an Irish hip hop musician, poet and visual artist.

== Early life ==
Harrington (born 1987 or 1988) is from Finglas, a suburb of Dublin. Her mother was a union activist and her father a musician. She also has a sister. As a child, she attended union meetings with her mother. She wrote her first poem when she was nine and started rapping around age eleven. At fourteen, she named herself "Temper Mental".

== Music and poetry ==
According to the Sunday Independent in 2013,

She cannot be categorised. There is no one box into which MissElayneous fits neatly and that's just the way she likes it. "How I'd describe myself as an artist is so broad," she says. "I'm a leonine; an ego-wrestling, lion-hearted one; an androgynous who uses the cultural movement of hip hop as a medium to portray messages of social awareness and individual empowerment."

Her debut EP, Proletarian Restitution, and the single "Step in the ring" was released in 2012. The same year, she had a poem published in The Stinging Fly. By then, she had an online following and encouraged girls in Finglas to express themselves through rap. She appeared in the 2012 documentary Ireland's Rappers and in the 2014 RTÉ2 reality series Connected. President Michael D. Higgins, seeing her perform in 2012, said she was "letting her life flow through the rhythms and sounds."

A writer with The Irish Times stated in 2013 "As long as this country is producing authentic artists with original voices like [Harrington] this is still a wonderful place." The same year she appeared in a commercial for the Arthur Guinness Project, which seeks to promote "creative innovation in Ireland". One critic, who was not a fan of hip-hop and believed that some of Harrington's pieces were "thrown together", nevertheless compared her to the British poet Kate Tempest and said "she is well worth paying to see". A 2015 article in the Irish Independent said that she "serves up her unique brand of rapping, hip-pop, bodhrán-beating, urban spoken word to growing audiences of teenagers in schools in Dublin's Northside. Teachers, impressed by her adept skill at bringing poetry to life for students, often call her back even to read aloud the poetry that's on the curriculum".

== Social activism ==
Harrington has been involved in the issue of homelessness in Dublin. She was herself homeless at times, and carried her belongings in her bodhrán case. She says "I became very resourceful but it was very dangerous and destructive and has had long term implications. It takes years to recover from homelessness - if you ever fully do". She has done community work in primary schools and youth centres, using her own hip hop curriculum. According to Harrington, "Hip hop is central to a sense of crews and a sense of community so I use it to develop that sense in young people". She played bodhrán and read poetry at a protest during a state visit by Queen Elizabeth II to Ireland in 2011, and was arrested together with other protesters.

== Visual art ==
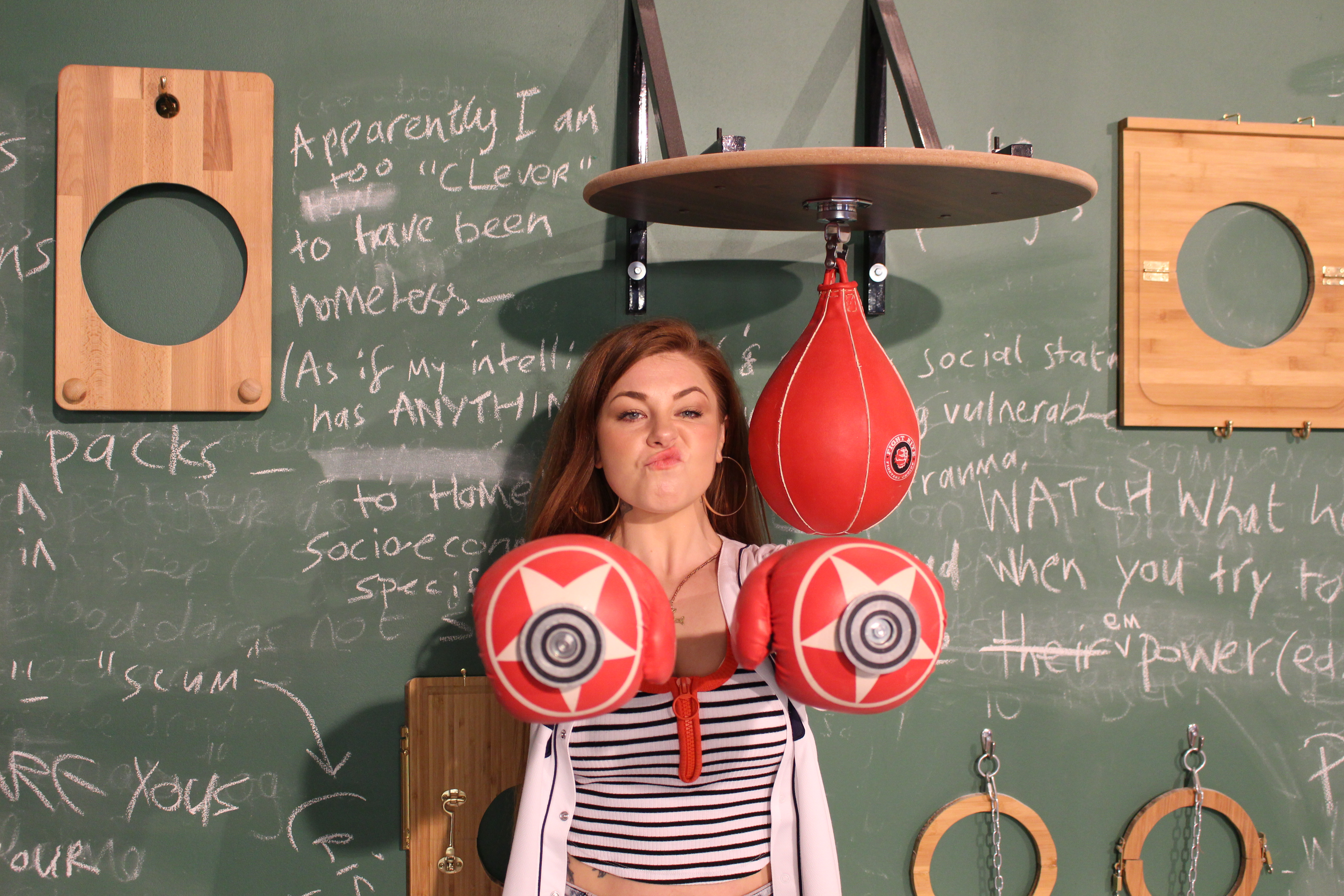
Harrington with Made to be Broken, 2019

As a graduate of fine art of National College of Art and Design in 2019, she displayed her work Instrumental, exploring "the ideas of the working class, the eight hour work day and the appropriation of working class labour and produce." In 2021, she received a residency at the Dean Arts Studio in Dublin, in a partnership with the Irish Museum of Modern Art (IMMA).

== Personal life ==
As of 2021, she is married. She is a vegan.

== See also ==
- Irish rap
