= Project Alpha (police) =

Metropolitan Police surveillance initiative

Project Alpha is a British Metropolitan Police Service intelligence gathering initiative set up in June 2019. One of the functions of the initiative is gathering information from social media. Its activities have included monitoring videos released by the UK drill music scene.

According to The Guardian, it has been involved in large-scale gathering of information about children.

== See also ==
- Predictive policing
