= Skengdo x AM =

UK drill duo

- Origin: Brixton, London, England
- Genres: British hip hop; UK drill
- Years active: 2014–present
- Labels: Finesse Foreva (2018–present); Marathon Artists (2017–2019)
- Spinoff of: 410
- Members: Skengdo (Terrell Daniel Doyley); AM (Joshua Malinga)

Skengdo x AM are an English hip hop duo from Brixton, London, formed by Terrell Daniel "Skengdo" Doyley and Joshua "AM" Malinga. They are both members of the UK drill collective and street gang, 410, which is known to have conflict with neighbouring Harlem Spartans, based in Kennington. The duo gained some media attention in 2019 where they were handed a suspended jail sentence due to performing a song that police alleged encouraged gang violence.

Skengdo x AM have sold-out tours in the UK, performed at Reading and Leeds Festival, and topped the iTunes hip-hop charts.

== History ==
In 2017, Skengdo x AM released their debut mixtape, 2Bunny. In 2018, the pair collaborated with Chicago drill pioneer Chief Keef in a song titled "Pitbulls". In 2017, Skengdo x AM released a successful "Mad About Bars" episode on Mixtape Madness with Kenny Allstar.

In 2018, the duo released Greener on the Other Side, a 7-song EP. In 2019, Skengdo x AM dropped their first full-length mixtape, Back Like We Never Left. In February 2020, this was followed by EU Drillas, a collaborative mixtape featuring drill artists across Europe.

== Legal issues ==
In June 2021, Skengdo was sentenced to six months in jail for possession of a knife, as well as a post-sentence supervision order lasting a year.

== Controversy ==
410 gained notability in the media, along with other groups involved within the UK drill scene, due to their association with London gang conflict and knife crime. The group was covered in 2019 in a Sky News documentary about the rising gang violence in London. Like with other UK drill groups, music videos from 410 have been removed by YouTube due to requests of their removal from the police.

In 2018, Skengdo x AM were handed a gang injunction by police preventing them from performing music that police claimed was inciting violence. It also prevented them from entering certain areas, such as Kennington. In January 2019, Skengdo x AM were handed a suspended jail sentence for breaching the gang injunction. The police cited their performance of a song titled "Attempted 1.0" as the culprit. Police claim the injunction was placed upon the pair due to evidence they were associated with gangs. TK & SK, their managers, claimed the two were not involved in gang violence. The court claimed they found evidence that drill music can, and was, encouraging violence. It was the first time in British legal history that a prison sentence had been given due to the performance of a song. Following this, rappers Krept & Konan formed a petition asking the police to "stop criminalising drill music". The pair also released a film, titled Ban Drill, addressing their concerns. An anti-censorship event was hosted at Saatchi Gallery. Both musicians performed music at the event. Russian artist Andrei Molodkin created an art-piece containing Skengdo x AM lyrics for the event criticising censorship. Skengdo x AM and Krept & Konan were invited by Diane Abbott to address the Houses of Parliament about censorship of drill music.

On 13 January 2021, their injunction ended and the duo are now able to continue producing drill music without any censorship.

== Discography ==
=== Albums ===
- Greener on the Other Side (2018)
- Back Like We Never Left (2019)
- EU Drillas (2020)

=== Mixtapes ===
- 2Bunny (2017)
