= A92 (group) =

Irish drill collective

- Origin: Drogheda, Ireland
- Genres: Irish hip hop; UK drill; Irish drill
- Years active: 2020–present
- Labels: Moves Recordings
- Members: Andre Fazaz; AO; BT; Dbo; Kebz; Ksav; Nikz; Offica
- Past members: ACE

A92 is an Irish drill collective based in Drogheda. Named after the postal code of Drogheda town, A92 was formed in 2020 and went viral following the release of "Plugged in Freestyle".

== History ==
A92 was formed in 2020 by Joel Safo, a manager working for JS Management. Prior to the formation of A92, Offica went viral following the release of "Naruto Drillings" in 2019, alongside a remix of the single with British YouTuber KSI. In an interview with Hot Press, Offica said that

We probably all live within eight minutes of each other's houses in Drogheda...we all support each other, and we maintain that when we're doing business as well.

A92 released their debut single "A9 Link Up" in September 2020, featuring Offica, BT, Nikz, Ksav, ACE, Dbo and Kebz. The group released "Plugged in Freestyle" in October 2020, which was produced by Fumez the Engineer; the song peaked in the top five of the Irish Homegrown charts and in the top 40 of the UK singles charts. The song rose in popularity due to its use on the social media platform TikTok, according to the BBC; by September 2021, the song had over 34 million views on YouTube. A92 released their debut mixtape 92 Degrees on 11 December 2020; the mixtape consisted of 15 tracks.

In 2021, A92, alongside Rhythm Bombs, also known as Prodigy Sons, wrote separate singles for a double A-side release; the proceeds went to SOSAD Ireland. A92's single, named "Champion", featured BT and Dbo and was produced by Charles Abako, also known as C2, and Andre Fazaz. It was also announced that a gig between the two groups was to take place at the Tommy Leddy Theatre on 23 October.

== Members ==
As of April 2021, A92 consists of eight members:

- Andre Fazaz (Olamide Fazaz)
- AO
- BT/Trapboy BT (Tobi Akinseloyin)
- Dbo (Lloyd Olalere)
- Kebz (Desmond Jibona)
- Ksav (Israel Kenny Olajide)
- Nikz (David Nkpa)
- Offica (Tomas Adeyinka)

== Discography ==
=== Mixtapes ===
- 92 Degrees (2020)

=== Charted singles ===
List of singles, with selected peak chart positions and certifications
Title	Year	Peak chart positions		Certifications
Title	Year	IRE	UK	Certifications
"Plugged in Freestyle" (with Fumez the Engineer and Offica)	2020	29	39	BPI: Gold
