= Blanco (British rapper) =

Angolan rapper & singer (born 1999)

- Also known as: Blanco Bourne
- Born: Joshua Emmanuel Pinto João Eduardo; 8 March 1999 (age 27); Cazenga, Luanda, Angola
- Genres: British hip hop; UK drill; afroswing; Brazilian funk
- Occupations: Rapper; singer; songwriter
- Years active: 2015–present
- Label: Polydor Believe UK
- Formerly of: Harlem Spartans

Joshua Emmanuel Pinto João Eduardo (born 8 March 1999), known professionally as Blanco, is an English-Angolan rapper and singer. Beginning his career in 2015, he released his debut EP, English Dubbed, in 2019, and debut mixtape, City of God, in 2021. He is a former member of the UK drill group Harlem Spartans.

== Career ==
Blanco began to write lyrics at the age of 15, taking inspiration from artists such as Skepta and 50 Cent. He would later join the Harlem Spartans collective through a youth centre in Kennington. In 2016, he released "Jason Bourne", which, according to New Wave Mag, certified his place as a well-respected drill artist.

In 2019, Blanco released his debut EP, English Dubbed.

On 24 August 2021, Blanco released his debut mixtape, named City of God after the 2002 film. The mixtape was named within Complex's best albums of 2021, with an article in Clash noting that the album saw him move away from a drill sound.

On 18 August 2023, Blanco released his second mixtape, named ReBourne. This saw him getting a BPI: Sliver award, peaking at 66th on the charts in the UK, and 95th in Ireland.

On 15 November 2024, Blanco released his third mixtape named Gilberto's Son. The song, named after his late father, was heavily influenced by his trip to Brasil.

On 21 November 2025, Blanco released the EP titled Paradise On A Lifeboat. The project perpetuates his illustration of his personal life story by blending social commentary with an abundance of anime references and themes that are consistent throughout his discography. The first track Regime is dedicated to Patrice Lumumba.

== Personal life ==
Blanco is a supporter of football club Manchester City F.C. He is of Angolan heritage.

== Legal issues ==
Blanco was jailed following an incident in the early hours of 15 February 2017, when a taxi containing Blanco and fellow Harlem member Mucktar Khan, better known as MizOrMac, was pulled over by armed police. The police searched the pair and found a loaded gun on Blanco and a samurai sword he had attempted to conceal in his trousers; additionally, MizOrMac was wearing ballistic body armour and had a balaclava. On 9 February 2018, Blanco was convicted of possession of a firearm and possession of an offensive weapon in a public place and sentenced to three and a half years in prison. His co-defendant MizOrMac was sentenced to six years.

== Discography ==
=== Mixtapes ===
List of mixtapes, with selected details
| Title | Details |
|---|---|
| City of God | Released: 24 August 2021; Label: Polydor |
| ReBourne | Released: 18 August 2023; Label: Believe UK |
| Gilberto's Son | Released: 15 November 2024; Label: Blanco |

=== EPs ===
List of EPs, with selected details
| Title | Details |
|---|---|
| English Dubbed | Released: 15 November 2019; Label: Polydor |

=== Charted singles ===
List of charted singles, with selected peak chart positions
| Title | Year | Peak chart positions | | Certifications | Album |
| Title | Year | UK | IRE | Certifications | Album |
|---|---|---|---|---|---|
| "The Great Escape" (with Central Cee) | 2021 | 62 | — | | City of God |
| "Brilliant Mind" | 2023 | 66 | 95 | BPI: Silver | ReBourne |
