= Zone 2 (group) =

British rap group and gang

- Origin: Peckham, London, England
- Genres: British hip-hop; UK drill
- Years active: 2016–present
- Members: See list
- Past members: See list

Zone 2 are a British rap group and street gang based in Peckham, London. They have gained millions of views and streams through their music on YouTube and streaming platforms. Zone 2 is noteworthy for its rivalry with Moscow17. The rivalry began around 2016 and has resulted in various stabbings between the two gangs, as well as murders.

== History ==
In December 2017, Zone 2 released the Known Zoo mixtape, later dubbed a 'classic' by DJ Mag.

In August 2021, Kwengface released his debut mixtape, YPB: Tha Come Up.

In June 2022, Kwengface released his second solo mixtape, YPB: The Archive, featuring CB, Dizzee Rascal, French the Kid, Dusty Locane, Squeeks and 26ar.

== Current members ==
The list below includes confirmed members of Zone 2:

- 2Krazy
- 6ix
- Bam Bam
- Big Mosh (aka Mosh)
- BR (aka BGody)
- Amz (aka AR, Armani Bailey)
- Gully
- Jojo
- KB
- Kgrindz
- Kadz
- Kenz (aka K2)
- Kodakz
- LD (aka Lil Dsqueezo, Lil DSQ)
- LR (aka Lil Reekz, NarmboyLr)
- Karma (or Karmakayos)
- Karnage
- Kiz
- Kwengface (formerly Narsty)
- O'
- Oppboybis
- Owz
- Reeks (aka Killer Reekz, Killa Reekz)
- Riddz
- S'O
- S Raggoe
- PS Hitsquad (or simply PS; formerly P and P Savage)(Alieu Koroma)

- Savage Dsqueezo (aka Dsqueezo, Dsqueezy, D Squeezo, Denz, Ds, DSQ, Denilson Davis)
- SH
- Shifty
- Sleeks
- Snoop (or Snoopy)(Dejon Prowse)
- Splash
- TC
- Teej
- Trizzac (aka Trizzler or Judas) –.
- Unruly Bad (or Shay Squeeze)

== Former members ==
- LrBabyOrBoo (or simply LR)
- RmSav
- Madmax(Matthew Adebiyi)
- Skully
- TB
- Crimez

== Legal issues ==
In 2017, two members of Moscow17, Incognito (real name Siddique Kamara) and Jet Black or JB (real name Kevin Aka-Kadjo) were charged of the murder of Abdirahman Mohamed, a brother to a Zone 2 member, but later cleared of murder. Incognito was later stabbed to death in August 2018. Moscow17 rapper, GB (real name Rhyhiem Ainsworth Barton), was allegedly stabbed, narrowly missing his heart by a Siraq/Somerleyton member before he became moscow. Although he survived the attack, he was later shot and killed in May 2018.

In August 2018, a fight occurred in a children's playground in the Elmington Estate, Camberwell. The fight involved around 30 teenagers, some armed with knives. A 15-year old was 'disembowelled' during the event after being stabbed with a long-bladed knife, causing 'massive internal-bleeding'. The boy who was stabbed was alleged to be a member of Moscow17, and the fight was allegedly between Moscow17 members and Zone 2 members.

In 2022, PS Hitsquad (real name Alieu Koroma) was sentenced to a total of 3 years and 7 months for being concerned with the supply of heroin and cocaine, as well as possession of a knife. According to the Essex Chronicle, he was found following a Metropolitan Police investigation into a missing 14-year old.

== Controversy ==
The group is notable for its rivalry with Moscow17 (based in the Brandon Estate, in Walworth). These rivalries are expressed in the form of diss tracks, such as "Zone 2 Step" in response to Moscow17's "Moscow March", and sometimes physical violence.

The group, and drill music in general, faced increased scrutiny by authorities following an increase in violence in 2018. Artists within the group, such as Kwengface, were given 'rap injunctions', restricting the topics they could rap about. In a 2021 interview, Kwengface explained:

The authorities interfered a lot, you know? Shows was getting locked off. We were doing things with Adidas and then they stopped working with us. A lot of artists didn't wanna work with us, labels wouldn't work with us [..] We were kind of just stuck. We were blacklisted, basically. I even took time out. I stopped releasing music for a while.

Following the lifting of rap injunctions against the group, in December 2019, Zone 2 released a song titled "No Censor!". The song gained notoriety and became infamous on social media due to the uncensored nature of the song, with various claims of murders committed by the group as well as dead rivals being named outright and mocked throughout the song. Drill artists typically allude to people they are dissing as opposed to naming them outright. The song was taken off of YouTube in less than 24 hours of its release, but has since been reuploaded. Kwengface stated the song was a reaction to previously being censored.

== Discography ==
=== Mixtapes ===
- Known Zoo (2017)
- Hillside Zoo (2018)
- Karma - Anger Management (2019)
- Karma & Trizzac - Demented (2020)
- Kwengface - YPB: Tha Come Up (2021)
- Kwengface - YPB: The Archive (2022)
- Kwengface - The Memoir (2023)
- PS Hitsquad - Community Service (2023)

== See also ==
- Peckham Boys
