= Let's Lurk =

2016 Drill song by 67

Single by 67
- Released: 19 September 2016
- Genre: UK drill
- Length: 4:46
- Label: 6ix 7even
- Songwriters: LD, ASAP, Dimzy, Monkey and Giggs
- Producer: GottiOnEm

67 singles chronology
| "Let's Lurk" (2016) | "Jump Out Gang" (2016) |

"Let's Lurk" is a UK drill song by 67 and Giggs. It samples an instrumental by GottiOnEm (an important member of the production camp known as The Brigade and recording studio known as On Da Beat Studio) and Mazza. The song is seen as instrumental in terms of establishing the UK Drill music scene.

== Background ==
The 67 group, based in the Brixton Hill area of London rose to fame in 2014. The song is considered to be legendary in terms of establishing the UK drill scene, separating it from the Chicago drill scene.
