= Don't Panic (Section Boyz album) =

Mixtape by Section Boyz
- Released: 18 September 2015
- Recorded: 2014–15
- Genre: British hip hop, trap
- Length: 71:06
- Producer: Nana Rogues; Nav Michael; Nyge; Pabz; Ricio Beats; Young Kico; 6 Figure Music

Section Boyz chronology
Sectionly (2014)	Don't Panic (2015)

Singles from Don't Panic
- 1. "Trophy" Released: 27 November 2014; 2. "Don't Like That" Released: 11 January 2015; 3. "Don't Panic" Released: 25 January 2015; 4. "Came Back (Bando)" Released: 31 May 2015; 5. "Who Needs a Hook!?" Released: 21 June 2015; 6. "Lock Arff" Released: 1 September 2015; 7. "Flashy Things" Released: 29 October 2015; 8. "Do the Road" Released: 11 November 2015

Don't Panic is the independently released second mixtape by British hip hop collective Section Boyz. The mixtape debuted at #21 on the iTunes chart on pre-orders alone, and reached #3 on the day of the release. In the mixtape's first week it reached number 37 in the UK Albums Chart, later peaking at number 36.

== Track listing ==
Digital download
No.	Title	Producer(s)	Length
1.	"Who Needs a Hook!?"	Nana Rogues	3:14
2.	"Don't Like That"	Young Kico; Pabz	5:40
3.	"Don't Panic"	6 Figure Music	4:37
4.	"Ghetto"	Nav Michael	5:16
5.	"Oi"	6 Figure Music	2:51
6.	"Brand New"		5:25
7.	"Trophy"	Ricio Beats	5:11
8.	"Roll with Me"	Nana Rogues	4:10
9.	"Lock Arff"	Nyge	5:51
10.	"Do the Road"		3:49
11.	"T House"		5:12
12.	"Came Back (Bando)"	Young Kico; Pabz	5:48
13.	"Flashy Things"		5:23
14.	"Bobby"		3:59
15.	"Trapping Ain't Dead (Section Remix)"	Nana Rogues	4:40
Total length:			71:06
