= Broederliefde =

Dutch hip-hop group

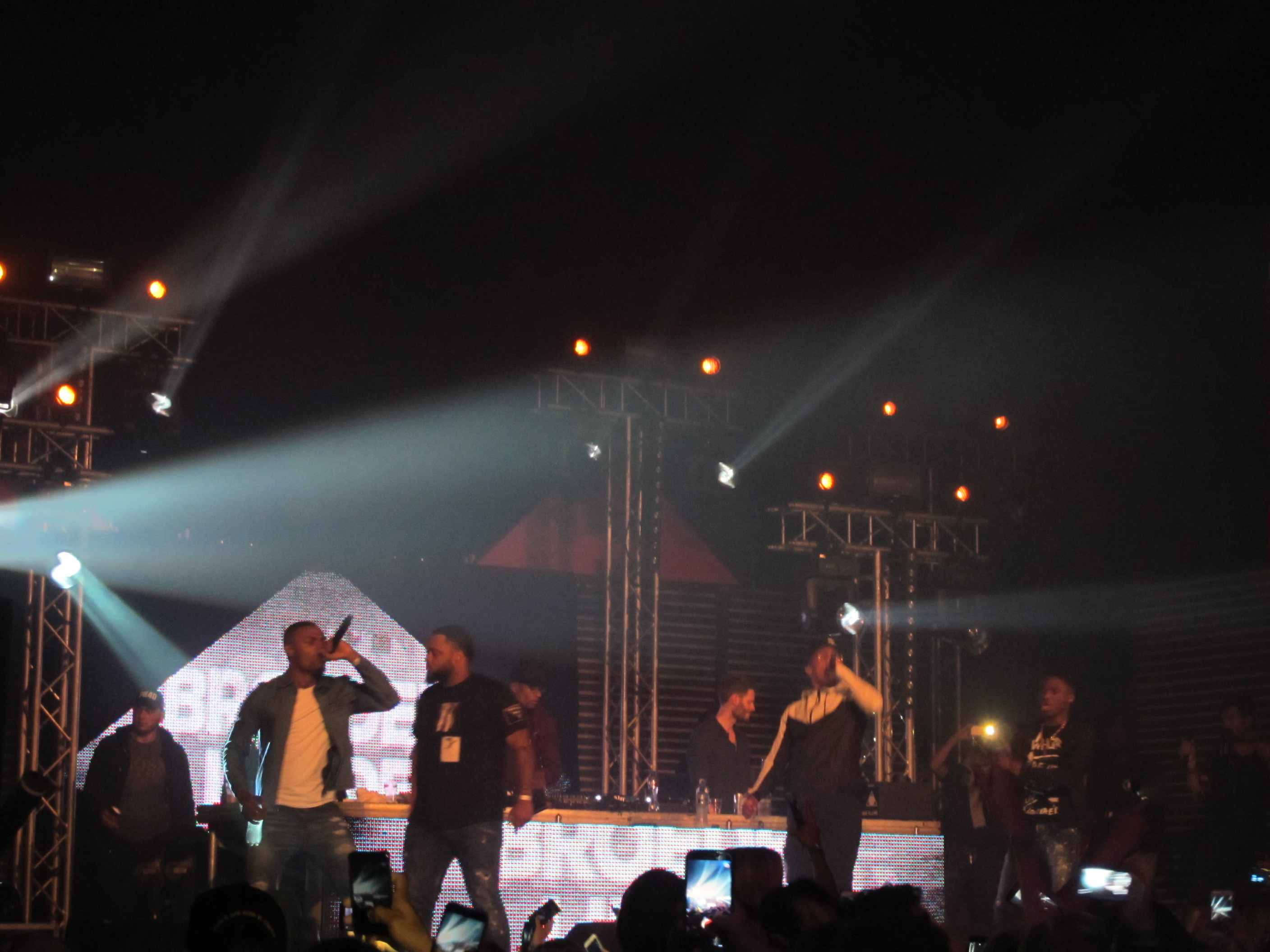
- Broederliefde, at the Huntenpop Festival in 2016.

Background information
- Origin: Netherlands
- Genres: Nederhop, hip hop
- Years active: 2013–present
- Labels: TopNotch
- Members: Edson; Emms; Jerr; Mella; Sjaf

Broederliefde are a Dutch hip-hop group, originating from Rotterdam. The group is composed of five rappers: Emms (Emerson Akachar), Jerr (Jerzy Rocha Livramento), Sjaf (Javiensley Dams), Edson (Edson Cesar) and Mella (Melvin Silberie). In 2016, their project Hard Work Pays Off 2 sat at the top of the album charts in the Netherlands for three months.

== Biography ==
The group members originated from Cape Verde, the Dominican Republic and Curaçao, and grew up in the Netherlands. They started off playing football, then moved into the studio. The group's name translates from Dutch as brotherly love (literally brotherlove).

Their first album, Gevoelig feestje, released in 2014, reached the top of the Album Top 100. They were nominated for Edison Awards. The group also won awards at the FunX Awards in the same year.

Their second album, Hard Work Pays Off, was released at the end of 2015, and contained the single Alaka. The single was the first released by Broederliefde, and was a certified platinum record reaching the Dutch Top 40 and Single Top 100. At the end of April 2016, the sequel to Hard Work Pays Off, named Hard Work Pays Off 2, was released. With its digital release, the album reached almost 700,000 listens on Spotify. Broederliefde again reached the Single Top 100. Hard Work Pays Off 2 remained for longer at number one than any record for 13 years, since Frans Bauer. It became the first Dutch-language album to reach number one for 13 weeks. In November, the album was also nominated for a 3voor12 Award, and the group was nominated for an MTV Award for best Dutch group.

After taking part in the Lowlands Festival, Broederliefde made a number of significant public appearances, including at Uitmarkt in Amsterdam, and on the local TV shows RTL Late Night and DINO. A collaboration with Jan Smit, named Kom dichterbij me, was especially written for their performance on DINO. Their single Jungle became the most played Dutch song on Spotify in 2016. In 2017, Broederliefde was ambassador to Bevrijdingsdag (Dutch Liberation Day).

== Discography ==
=== Studio albums ===
- Gevoelig Feestje (2014)
- Medaille (2021)

=== Mixtapes ===
- Hard Work Pays Off (2015)
- Hard Work Pays Off 2 (2016)

=== Singles ===
- "Moral" (featuring William Araujo, 2015)
- "No Money, No Love" (2015)
- "Hard Work Pays Off" (featuring SBMG, 2015)
- "Nu sta je hier" (2015)
- "Alaka" (2015)
- "Qu'est qu'il ya" (2016)
- "Miljonairs" (featuring Frenna and Ronnie Flex, 2016)
- "Eigenlijk" (2016)
- "Oh jij" (2016)
- "Danswater" (2016)
- "Jongvolwassen" (featuring Chivv and Jonna Fraser, 2016)
- "Narcos" (featuring SBMG, Jonna Fraser, Hef, Ronnie Flex and RMB, 2016)
- "Ballon" (featuring SBMG and Jayh, 2016)
- "Hoelang" (2019)

== Awards ==
- 2016 – Kom dichterbij me – Gold disc
- 2016 – Nu sta je hier – 2× Platinum disc
- 2016 – Broederliefde – Hard Work Pays Off 2 – Platinum disc
