= Harlem Spartans =

British hip hop collective

- Also known as: Harlem O; Harlem
- Origin: Kennington, London, England
- Genres: British hip hop; UK drill
- Years active: 2014–present
- Members: See list
- Past members: See list

Harlem Spartans, often abbreviated to HS, also known as Harlem O or simply Harlem, is an English hip-hop collective based in Kennington, London. Members of Harlem Spartans have acquired over 100 million streams through their music. The name, "Harlem", is a nickname for their local area of Kennington. The police allege that Harlem Spartans is a gang, however this is denied by the group.

Harlem Spartans is affiliated with Walworth-based group Moscow17. Australian drill group Onefour cites Harlem Spartans as a major influence in their music. They are considered to be one of the pioneers of the UK drill scene.

== History ==
=== Beginnings (2014–2018) ===
Harlem Spartans started making music in 2014, using a local youth centre as a music studio. Most artists within Harlem Spartans are from Kennington, with many of them attending Archbishop Tenison's School in Oval. Musically, like much of UK drill music, their music contains references to their local area, violence, references to disputes with other groups (referred to as “beef”), and is often riddled with slang.

The group is known for its rivalry with Brixton-based group 410. The rivalry has been expressed through various diss tracks, and has at times escalated to physical violence. 410 rapper AM released the song "Attempted 1.0" in 2018. The song contained many direct references to violence towards Harlem Spartans members. Skengdo & AM, members of 410, were later given a gang injunction from the police that banned them from entering Kennington or mentioning rival gangs in their music.

=== Rise to fame and success of Harlem Spartans (2018–present) ===
Prominent songs from the group include "Call Me a Spartan", "Kennington Where It Started", and Loski's songs "Cool Kid", "Hazards", and "Forrest Gump", the latter of which entered the charts. These songs combined have gained over 65 million views on YouTube, as of October 2023. In April 2018, Loski released his mixtape Call Me Loose.

Canadian artist Drake has publicly stated he is a 'fan' of Harlem Spartans, and has posted Harlem Spartan music lyrics onto his social media. In 2019, Drake appeared on-stage alongside Harlem Spartans member Loski. Drake credited Loski as an influence for his album Scorpion.

== Current members ==
The list below includes confirmed members of Harlem Spartans. DJ Sparta is also known to DJ for the group.

- Active (also known as Aydee)
- Anwar
- Loski (LoskiHarlem)
- Aze (aka Ace)
- Bellz (aka Bailey Phelps)
- C Rose (aka Chudz, Crose)
- CK
- DayDay
- YM
- FK
- GuyGuy (aka GG)
- G'Smarko (aka Imran Ibrahim)
- H1
- Herc300
- HL8
- Hyze
- Gee Splash (or simply Splash)
- Jmash
- JoJo
- Jus
- TTrap
- JWoosh
- Kadz
- Kamz
- LM (aka Lil Mikez, Trapfit)
- Loski
- OnDrills
- R1
- Savage
- Scratcha
- SD
- Snow
- Splash (aka GSplash, G Splash, Y.Gface)
- TG Millian (or simply TG)
- Trapfit (formerly LM)
- TS
- T.Y
- Y.Shockz
- AtzLndz
- Y.Smarkz

== Former members ==
- Bis (also known as YS, Crosslom Davis) (deceased)
- Mizormac
- Blanco
- MK (aka Mo, Mo Kwenga, Mohamed Dura-Ray) (deceased)
- SA (short for Splash Addict, L1, Latwaan Raheem Griffiths; also known as Latz) (deceased)
- Young Bellz (aka YB, YBellz, Yung Bellz, Y.Bellz, Psy)
- Warz (deceased)
- NM (Naghz Max, Madmax)
- Phineas(de-recruited)

== Controversy ==
=== Death of SA ===
Latwaan Griffiths, better known by his stage names SA and Latz, was found with numerous knife wounds after being attacked whilst on the back of a moped in Camberwell, South London, on 25 July 2018 at the age of 18. A 17 year old was arrested the following day in connection to the murder. However, as of January 2022, nobody has been charged in relation to the murder. It was reported that Griffiths was stabbed to death in Camberwell. Later in the evening, shots were fired at homes that police suspect were homes of 410 members. One member of 410 is alleged to have attacked a Harlem Spartans member with a metal pole in the waiting room of HM Prison Thameside.

=== Death of Bis ===
On 6 December 2019, Harlem Spartans member Crosslon Davis, better known as Bis, was stabbed and killed in Bronze Street, Deptford, south-east London. The violent attack started after Elijah Morgan and Jedaiah Param got into the minicab and Davis attacked Morgan with a mallet. The minicab drove away from the scene a short distance before the driver was told to stop and Elijah Morgan and Jedaiah Param got out and started chasing Davis. CCTV footage from Ha’penny Hatch showed that Davis was pursued by the pair, as well as two other unidentified males, who were all armed with knives or machetes. Davis' friend had tried to place himself between him and the attackers, but he was overpowered. All four of them stabbed Davis, who collapsed to the ground.

Despite paramedics' efforts, Crosslon died a short time later due to the loss of blood from at least nine stab wounds, including one that penetrated his lung and heart. He was pronounced dead at 03:30 after being stabbed multiple times. Bis was 20-years old at time of death. Elijah Morgan, 20, and Jedaiah Param, 21, were found guilty on 12 March 2021 following a trial at the Old Bailey. They were both sentenced at the same court on 19 April 2021 to a minimum of 28 years in jail.

== Legal issues ==
=== Imprisonment of MizOrMac ===
Mucktar Khan, better known by his stage name MizOrMac, was jailed following an incident in the early hours of February 15, 2017, when a taxi containing MizOrMac and fellow Harlem member Joshua Eduardo, better known as Blanco, was pulled over by armed police. The police searched the pair and found a loaded gun on Blanco and a samurai sword he had attempted to conceal in his trousers, additionally MizOrMac was wearing ballistic body armour and had a balaclava. On 9 February 2018, MizOrMac was convicted of possession of a firearm and possession of an offensive weapon in a public place and sentenced to six years in prison. His co defendant Blanco was sentenced to 3 and a half years. On 11 December 2020, he announced via Twitter that he'd been recalled for an undisclosed amount of time.

On 3 November 2020, MizOrMac was arrested alongside three others following a shooting that injured afroswing artist Midas the Jagaban and her manager; while the police were pursuing him, he pointed a semi-automatic handgun at a police officer. He was later sentenced in 2022 to 9 years for possession of a prohibited firearm and possession of a firearm with intent to commit an indictable offense.

== Discography ==
=== Mixtapes ===
- TG Millian - The Mixtape: Episode 1
