= Fumez the Engineer =

British audio engineer

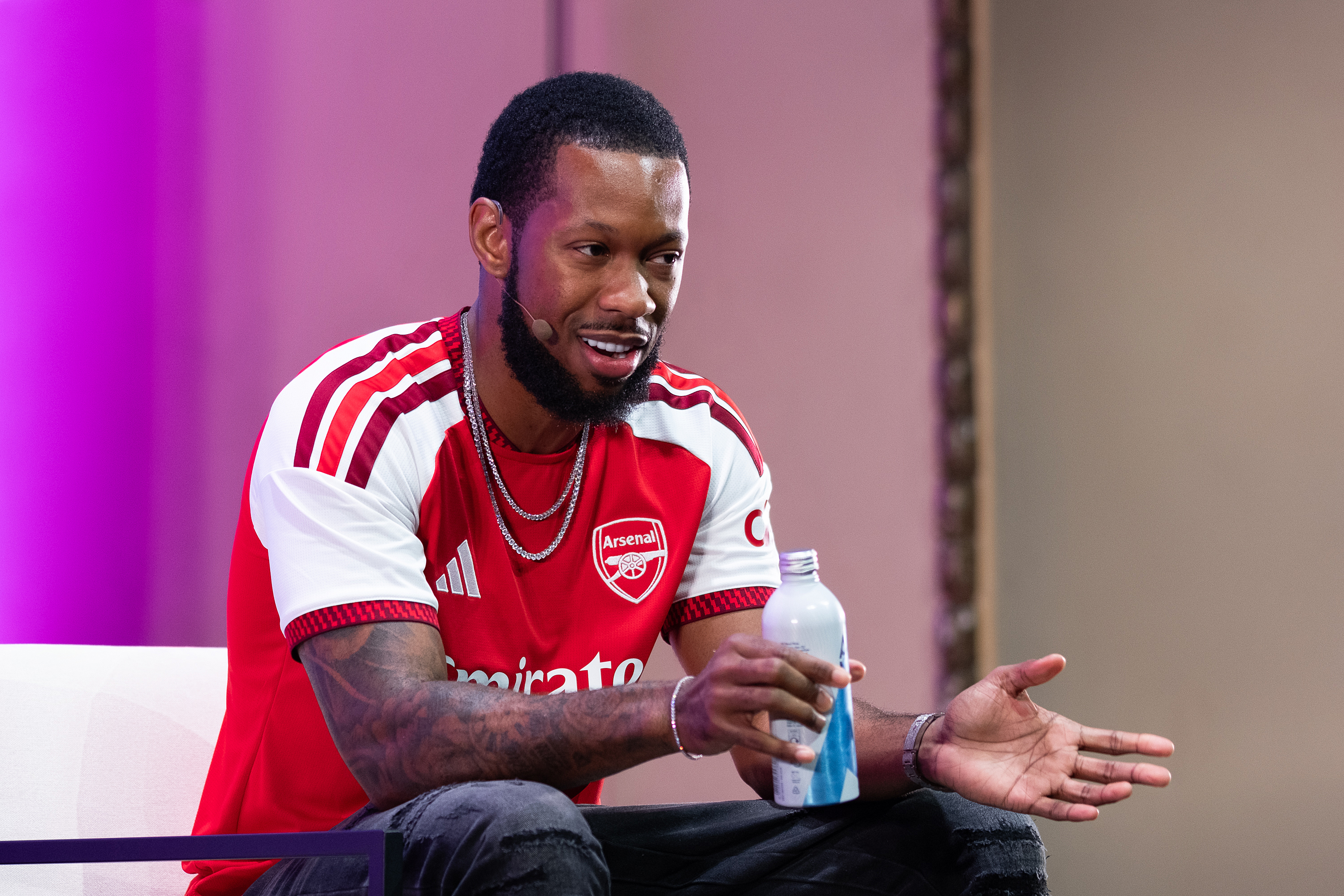
- Fumez the Engineer at SXSW London 2026

Background information
- Born: Jahrell Bryan; 16 February 1993 (age 33)
- Origin: London, England
- Genres: British hip hop; UK drill
- Occupations: Audio engineer, producer, rapper
- Years active: 2010–present
- Label: Believe Music

Jahrell Bryan (born 16 February 1993), commonly known as Fumez the Engineer, is a British rapper and audio engineer from London. Joining Pressplay Media - a UK rap platform - in 2012, he later moved to Link Up TV, where he would stay before moving back to Pressplay Media following the beginning of his Plugged In freestyle series in 2020. Between his move to Link Up TV and his return to Pressplay, he would release two mixtapes, named The Mix-Tape and The Mix-Tape 2, with the latter being released in 2018.

== Career ==
In a 2016 interview with Trapped, Fumez said that he began his career at the age of 15 in a youth club; at the time, however, he wouldn't take a career that seriously. In 2012, Fumez helped to launch Pressplay Media, a major UK rap platform, at the age of 18. Later becoming its owner, he would go into debt as a result of the company; he would sell his shares to Daniel Olkhovski, a former director of Pressplay who Fumez used to manage.

Following this, Fumez went to Link Up TV, another UK rap platform. During his time there, he would engineer for Link Up TV's Mic Check and Behind Barz freestyle series; he would also begin several series, such as Studio with Fumez - where he would ask artists questions submitted by the audience - and the Plugged In series of freestyles, with the first Plugged In freestyle being released on 29 March 2020. Sometime following this, he was asked to return to Pressplay Media by Olkhovski. By April 2021, the Plugged In series had over 100 million views and over 100 million streams; by the end of the year, his "Plugged in Freestyle" with Irish rappers A92 and Offica reached number 29 on the Irish Singles Chart and number 39 on the UK chart.

In 2021, Fumez engineered a remix of "Bad Habits" by Ed Sheeran, which featured Tion Wayne and Central Cee. The remix was credited with "boosting" the song to 8 weeks at number one. He would also begin the In the Mix series, which followed his journey in the music industry. In November, his headline show at the Islington O2 Academy was canceled to due a section 60 order being placed over the N1 postcode, where the O2 Academy was located.

== Discography ==
=== Mixtapes ===
- The Mix-Tape (2016)
- The Mix-Tape 2 (2018)

=== Singles ===
List of singles, with selected peak chart positions
| Title | Year | Peak chart positions | | Certifications |
| Title | Year | IRE | UK | Certifications |
|---|---|---|---|---|
| "Plugged in Freestyle" (with A92 and Offica) | 2020 | 29 | 39 | BPI: Gold |
| "Plugged in Freestyle" (with BM and Sava) | 2020 | – | 81 | BPI: Silver |
| "Plugged In" (with Skepta) | 2021 | – | 93 | |

== Awards and nominations ==
| Year | Award | Work | Category | Result | Ref. |
|---|---|---|---|---|---|
| 2021 | Urban Music Awards | – | Best Entertainer | Nominated | |
