= Smoke Boys =

English rap group

- Origin: Croydon, London, England
- Genres: British hip hop; trap; UK drill
- Years active: 2010–2020
- Label: Section
- Members: Ghost; Littlez; Inch; Sleeks; Knine; Swift; Deepee
- Past members: Reeko Squeeze

Smoke Boys (formerly Section Boyz and before that Squeeze Section) were a British hip hop collective started by British rapper Ghost in 2010. On 25 September 2015 the group's second mixtape Don't Panic entered at number 36, making their first UK Albums Chart entry. On 4 November 2015, they won Best Newcomer at the MOBO Awards. They were considered to be highly influential in the UK drill scene.

== History ==
The collective began in 2011 as a loose association of individual rappers from Croydon in South London. First the group called themselves ‘Squeeze 4 P$‘, and then ‘Squeeze Section’. The group released their first mixtape titled Sectionly in 2014 as ‘Section Boyz’. With the second mixtape Don't Panic, the group made it into the “Top 40” of the British Music Charts in 2015 and were subsequently honoured as best newcomers at the MOBO Awards. The group was also chosen to be on the list of the “Sound Of 2016” at the BBC.

In 2016, the group was awarded as the best hip-hop act of the year at the MOBO Awards. This was followed by further mixtapes every year. In 2018 the group changed their name to ‘Smoke Boys’ and released their fifth mixtape Don’t Panic II. The tape brought them into the charts once again. In October 2020 the group released their sixth, and final mixtape titled All The Smoke. Part of the group was also their DJ Grievious

== Discography ==
=== Mixtapes ===
List of mixtapes, with selected chart positions
| Title | Album details | Peak chart positions | | |
| Title | Album details | UK | UK R&B | UK DL |
|---|---|---|---|---|
| Sectionly | Released: 3 August 2014; Label: Section; Format: Digital download | - | - | - |
| Don't Panic | Released: 18 September 2015; Label: Section; Format: Digital download | 36 | 3 | 15 |
| Attack the Block (with Chris Brown & OHB) | Released: 28 October 2016; Label: OHB, CBE; Format: Digital download | - | - | - |
| Soundcheck | Released: 24 March 2017; Label: Section; Format: Digital download | - | - | - |
| Don't Panic II | Released: 19 October 2018; Label: Self-released; Format: Digital download | - | - | - |
| All the Smoke | Released: 30 October 2020; Label: Self-released; Format: Digital download | - | - | - |
"—" denotes a recording that did not chart or was not released in that territory.

=== EP ===
- Delete My Number (2016)

== Awards and nominations ==
- MOBO Awards Best Newcomer 2015
- MOBO Awards Best Hip-Hop 2016
