= UK drill =

Subgenre of drill music

- Stylistic origins: British hip hop; drill; road rap; grime music; UK garage
- Cultural origins: Early 2010s, Angell Town, Brixton, London, England
- Typical instruments: Vocals; audio editing software; digital audio workstation

UK drill is a subgenre of drill music and road rap that originated in the South London district of Brixton from 2013 onwards. While being sonically distinct from Chicago drill music, it embraces its aesthetic and melds it with road rap, a British style of gangsta rap that became popular in the years prior to the existence of drill. UK drill lyrical content tends to be truculent, depicting the harsh realism of their lifestyles. The explicit lyricism has stimulated discussion about whether or not the subgenre is a factor in an increase in knife crime in London. Gang affiliation and socioeconomically-deprived backgrounds are common amongst UK drill artists. Artists such as 150, 67, Harlem Spartans, CGM, and 410 have been cited as innovators of UK drill.

== Characteristics ==
UK drill developed a different production style than the most common Chicago beat patterns, albeit still based on Chicago drill styles originally pioneered by DJ L, a Chicago producer who collaborated with rapper G Herbo in the early Chicago scene. The genre also took influence from earlier British genres such as grime and UK garage; in an interview with Complex, Jammer noted that "without grime...there would be no UK drill." Drill producer Mazza noted that both drill and grime share a similar rawness and energy, despite the two genres remaining distinct from each other. Drill producer Carns Hill, alongside several drill rappers, noted that UK drill should probably have a "new name" to distinguish it from the original Chicago drill sound. UK drill is generally more fast-paced compared to its Chicago counterpart. UK drill beats are generally structured around an contrast to the typical trap/Chicago drill beat, the hi-hats have moved from on-beat and triplet subdivisions to a steady 3+3+2 polyrhythm, hi-hat pattern, with snares landing on the fourth beat instead of the third every 2 bars. Instrumentals often also have a sliding bass, hard hitting kicks, and dark melodies. AXL Beats explained that the 808s and fast-tempo snares in UK drill are derivative of grime music. Both genres typically use a tempo of approximately 138–151 beats per minute. The use of British slang, intricate lyrical flows, and elements of social commentary further help distinguish UK drill from its Chicago and Brooklyn counterparts, which are often characterised by a more aggressive, stream-of-consciousness style. As referenced in the book What Do You Call It? From Grassroots to the Golden Era of UK Rap (2024), UK drill also developed its own distinct visual identity, shaped in part by economic realities. As Brixton-based rapper Skengdo explained: "The Chicago lot had True Religion jeans, Timberlands, they were all swagger. But coming up as 15–16-year-olds in the ends, not everyone can afford expensive brands. So [we're wearing] Nike tracksuits and Tech hoodies in the video."

Censorship of UK drill lyrics through vocal cuts and mutes is sometimes done to avoid them being used during their prosecution by the police; for example, "shh" is used in songs to replace the names of people, weapons and criminal acts.

== History ==
150 (now known as GBG), a group from the Angell Town Estate in Brixton, is often credited with pioneering UK drill music, with 150 members Stickz, M Dargg and Grizzy (stylized as GR1ZZY) being dedicated exponents of the early style. 67 is often credited for shifting the sound away from the Chicago influences it seemed to heavily draw inspiration from in its early days and foundation and for forming a more homegrown sound. Producers Carns Hill (who crafted instrumentals for many of 67's early songs) and QUIETPVCK (who worked closely by 150 and 410 members in their early era) are widely considered to be two of the main pioneering producers of the genre with their unique and innovative alternatives to the Chicago drill sound.

An article from VICE divided the history of UK drill into 3 phases; the first of these phases, which lasted from 2014 to 2018, resulted in drill becoming "its own distinctly British entity", with the phase peaking in 2016 following the release of "Let's Lurk" by 67, featuring Giggs and produced by GottiOnEm and Mazza. Given that the genre was "locked out" of the mainstream music industry due to its uncensored nature, music videos became a major player in the genre's circulation. Its uncensored nature also resulted in Form 696 being used to cancel shows by drill artists. In early 2017, "Kennington Where It Started" was released by the Harlem Spartans, considered by fans to have turned UK drill from an underground genre into a mainstream one.

In 2018, members of 1011 (now known as CGM), including Digga D, were given a court order that banned them from making music without police permission; in addition, they couldn't mention death or injury, including the death of Abdullahi Tarabi, and had to notify police in advance of any song releases or performances. Kevin Southworth, Detective Chief Superintendent, noted that it was "one of the first times" that such an order was made. The order was condemned by Index on Censorship.

In 2019, Skengdo & AM, members of drill group 410, were handed a 9-month suspended sentence, suspended for 2 years, for breaching a gang injunction. According to The Guardian, the injunction, which lasted until January 2021, prevented Skengdo & AM, as well as 2 other members of 410, from entering the SE11 postcode, as well as prohibiting them from performing songs that had lyrics mentioning rival crews, their rappers or any mentions to them entering the territory of other groups. The sentence resulted in a letter being signed by 65 people that was addressed to the Metropolitan Police, calling upon them to stop issuing gang injunctions and stating that musicians should be given the rights of freedom of speech and creative expression.

In March 2025 Eddy Frankel, reviewing in The Guardian the art installation on drill music Anti-Blackness Is Bad, Even the Parts That We Like by RIP Germain, said that the UK drill scene was dead as so many singers were in prison—the installation depicted 42 rappers, all in prison.

== Influence ==
UK drill received widespread attention outside of Britain in 2017, when comedian Michael Dapaah released the novelty song "Man's Not Hot" under the name "Big Shaq" or "Roadman Shaq" which went to number three on the UK singles chart and went platinum in the UK, Australia & Sweden as well as going Gold in Belgium, France, Germany, New Zealand & Norway. The track sampled a beat made by UK drill producers GottiOnEm and Mazza; it was first used by drill group 86 on its song "Lurk", and, later on, 67 on "Let's Lurk" featuring Giggs.

Unknown T's song "Homerton B" charted on the Official Singles Chart after its August 2018 release, becoming the first UK drill single to do so. The song entered at number 83 on the chart on 28 August 2018, then peaked at 48 in September 2018.

UK drill group 67 had two entries into the official charts; however, unlike "Homerton B", the entries were on the albums chart and not the singles chart. They reached number 66 in the Official Albums Chart with the mixtape Let's Lurk and number 71 with the mixtape The Glorious Twelfth. Although considered a predominantly trap-based album that implemented some drill features and elements, Section Boyz's mixtape Don't Panic reached number 37 in the UK Albums Chart, later peaking at number 36 in 2015.

Canadian musician Drake did a "Behind Barz" freestyle for Link Up TV in 2018, where he rapped over a UK drill beat. Drake also credited UK drill artist Loski as an influence for his 2018 album, Scorpion. In 2019, Drake released "War"; the song used UK drill's production style and was produced by British producer AXL Beats. Drake's flow in both instances was reminiscent of UK drill artists.

In 2020, DigDat released Ei8ht Mile. The mixtape scored the biggest opening week for a UK drill album at the time, opening at number 12. The same year, Skengdo & AM released EU Drillas, a collaborative project that featured drill artists from across Europe; in addition, Headie One released "Only You Freestyle" with Drake, which peaked at number 5 on the UK Singles Chart. Towards the end of the year, he released Edna, which debuted at number one on the UK Albums Chart, becoming the first UK drill album to do so.

In 2021, Digga D's mixtape Made in the Pyrex peaked at number three on the UK Albums Chart, becoming the highest-charting UK drill mixtape at the time. In the same year, Tion Wayne and Russ Millions released "Body", becoming the first UK drill song to reach Number 1 on the UK Singles Chart.

Though the genre originated in London, it is not restricted to London alone as the genre's sole production hub in terms of emerging talents and dissemination of the sound. Artists around the country have appeared and become prominent creators within the scene, such as SmuggzyAce and S.White of Birmingham group 23 Drillas and SV of Nottingham.

UK drill has spread outside of the United Kingdom, with artists and groups in other countries rapping in styles and using slang terms heavily influenced by UK drill music, and using UK drill instrumentals produced by British producers. Ireland, the Netherlands, and Australia in particular have developed drill scenes that are heavily indebted to UK drill music, with artists such as OneFour in Australia, Offica and A92 in Ireland, and 73 De Pijp from The Netherlands. In addition, artists in Spain making drill music have also taken on influence by its British counterpart, with various references and similar production to UK drill; Spanish drill artists include 970Block and Skinny Flex. Other countries with UK drill-inspired scenes include Ghana (also known as Asakaa) and France.

Brooklyn drill music began rising to prominence in the late 2010s. Brooklyn drill has taken influence from UK drill with artists such as Pop Smoke, Sheff G, and 22Gz collaborating with UK drill producers such as AXL Beats, Yoz Beats, Ghosty, and 808Melo. 808Melo produced "Welcome to the Party" for Pop Smoke, which received a considerable amount of attention. Pop Smoke created a mixtape produced entirely by 808Melo and Trap House Mob (a team of UK-based producers).

UK drill, alongside grime, has been cited as a reason for the expansion of Multicultural London English to other countries, including Finland and Australia.

== Culture ==
UK drill groups often engage in rivalries with each other – sometimes violent – often releasing multiple diss tracks towards each other. The names of these groups sometimes reflect the postcode they are located in. Notable rivalries include 67 versus GBG/150, Harlem Spartans versus 410, Zone 2 versus Moscow17, and CGM/1011 versus 12World.

The aesthetic of UK drill videos was described by Jonathan Ilan, of the University of London, in a paper within The British Journal of Criminology; the aesthetic included groups of young men, usually near council houses and wearing a variety of streetwear, using hand gestures to represent a variety of things, including tributes to their friends that were dead or jailed. In addition, as a result of the police response to UK drill, drill artists began to adopt masks to protect their identities; these masks soon became an artistic statement, with an article in Dazed saying that, "As much as a method of hiding personal information, it was also a way of standing out from the crowd." A 2021 book regarding music genres noted that "rather than personalized nicknames, performers strip themselves of any individuality or character so as to become...conflated with their gang."

== Controversy ==
The genre's violent lyrics have been cited by police, MPs, journalists and others in positions of potentially significant influence as the reason for a climb in the rate of knife crimes in London. In one instance, then 17-year-old rapper M-Trap who had written lyrics about knife attacks, was part of a four-person group that stabbed a 15-year-old boy to death, for which he received a life sentence. Judge Anthony Leonard QC told Simpson, "You suggested [the lyrics] were just for show but I do not believe that, and I suspect you were waiting for the right opportunity for an attack."

In defence of the genre, a 2019 paper in The Sociological Review says that the genre "naturalistically broadcasts, but does not cause violent crime" and that drill musicians have become "both suspects and victims of state-administered racial injustice in an allegedly post-racial era." Another paper, published in The British Journal of Criminology, states that:

"Media stories that position drill music as a cause of urban violence also...tend to reaffirm the view that young urban black men—and the forms of culture that appear tied to this population—constitute a threat to the civic mainstream. These stories...appear to have fed into the vague police cultures that sustain racialized stop and search practices in the capital."

An article by Ciaran Thapar states that, rather than addressing the causes of youth violence, "those in power are content to target the music that rises, like steam from a pressure cooker, out of these conditions."

In May 2018, YouTube reported that it had deleted more than half of the "violent" music videos identified by senior police officers as problematic; this was done through Operation Domain, which was established in September 2015 to remove gang-related YouTube videos. Metropolitan Police Commissioner Cressida Dick blamed some videos for fuelling a surge in murders and violent crime in London, singling out drill music. YouTube said that more than 30 clips had been removed. The removal of drill videos caused outrage in the community – with several drill artists condemning the Metropolitan Police – and caused a slight lull in production of the music.

In 2018, FACT magazine claimed in an article on UK drill producers M1OnTheBeat & MKThePlug:

..."Drill is this generation's furious response against the Conservative government's decimation of state support for the most vulnerable communities under austerity".

In late 2018, South London-born driller Drillminister created a track called "Political Drillin", which was broadcast on Channel 4 News and used comments made by Members of Parliament, attempting to highlight their own hypocrisy in using violent language.

In 2021, a report by Policy Exchange stated that 37% of homicide cases in 2018 were linked to drill music. The report was condemned in a letter signed by 49 criminologists, which said that the report was factually incorrect.

In 2022, the Crown Prosecution Service announced that it would update guidance regarding the use of drill lyrics within criminal trials; the announcement stemmed from concerns from numerous groups, including academics and organisations such as JUSTICE.

The coalition known as Art Not Evidence formed as a growing group of lawyers, journalists, artists, academics, youth workers, music industry professionals and human rights campaigners working together to fight the criminalisation of rap music in UK courts. The group believes that art, and particularly rap music, should be protected as a fundamental form of freedom of expression, and should not be used to unfairly implicate individuals in criminal charges.

A black Manchester man, Ade Adedeji, served three years in prison wrongfully, after false evidence that he was in a certain drill music video was presented to the jury in the prosecution's attempt to prove he was a gang member. He was released from prison in January 2025 after new evidence proved that he was in fact not in the video. Adedeji feels that his wrongful conviction is race related. Barrister, Keir Monteith KC, founding member of the campaign Art Not Evidence, which calls for a stop to rap lyrics and music videos being used as evidence in UK trials, commented on the weakness of the prosecution's evidence against Adedeji stating rhetorically "Things like where [Ade] lives, his interest in music, who he knocks around with – that's enough to prove he's in a gang?".

== See also ==
- Detroit drill
- Project Alpha (police)
