= Arsenal F.C. supporters =

Fans of Arsenal Football Club

Arsenal supporters in 2026

London-based Arsenal Football Club has developed a strong following since its founding in 1886. Since the 1980s, Arsenal's fans have often been referred to as Gooners, a derivative of the team's nickname, "the Gunners".

Many fanzines, blogs, podcasts and fans websites have been dedicated to the club and the fans have long-standing rivalries with several other clubs, the most notable of which is with near neighbours Tottenham Hotspur, with whom they regularly contest the North London derby.

The club and the fans have regularly featured in portrayals of football in British culture but Arsenal fans come from far and wide; a 2005 report estimated Arsenal's global fanbase at 112 million, the third-largest in the world. A September 2011 report estimated Arsenal's fanbase at 100 million worldwide, still making them the third-largest team in terms of supporters.

Gay Gooners supporter in London, 2016

Arsenal fans have long been stereotyped for the dissatisfaction they appear to feel – and express – towards their club. Sometimes the regular low-level grumbling will erupt, with severe criticisms and bitter feelings being aired. An example of this in the 2010s was a vociferous group – dubbed "The Anti-Arsenal Arsenal" – that had manager Arsène Wenger as the principal target of their dissatisfactions. However, the perception of Arsenal fans as being hard to please is an old one. Even at times of success antagonism was noted. Such was the experience of the title winning teams of 1953 and 1971. Not even the figure behind the successful 1930s team successes was spared: Herbert Chapman complained of the activities of the "boo-boys" and title-winning manager George Graham was strongly criticised over choice of players and tactical strategy.

In 2010, Arsenal supporters became the first fans of a Premier League club able to buy percentages of a stake in Arsenal through a "fanshare" scheme, therefore giving them rights to attend shareholders meetings.

== Attendances ==
Arsenal supporter at Emirates Stadium in 2026

Arsenal's performance in home matches have resulted in them having the second-highest average League attendance for an English club during the 2007–08 season, (60,069, which was 99.5% of available capacity), and as of 2006, the fourth-highest all-time average attendance. Arsenal have the highest proportion (7.7%) of non-white attending supporters of any club in the Premier League, according to a 2002 report.

Arsenal supporter from Scotland at Emirates Stadium

There are supporters' clubs worldwide. A 2005 report by Granada Ventures, which at the time owned a 9.9% stake in the club, estimated Arsenal's global fanbase at 27 million, the third-largest in the world.

== Songs ==
The team's current anthem is "The Angel (North London Forever)" by Louis Dunford, usually played before every Arsenal home games at Emirates Stadium.

In addition to the usual English football chants, Arsenal's supporters sing "Freed from Desire" by Gala, "One-Nil to the Arsenal" (to the tune of "Go West") and also regularly sing "Who's that team they call the Arsenal", "Good Old Arsenal" (to the tune of "Rule, Britannia!") and "We're the North Bank/Clock End Highbury". The fans also chant "Boring, Boring Arsenal" in self-deprecating reference to Arsenal's reputation during the 1970s and 1980s as an overly defensive, cautious team.

== Rivalries ==
One of Arsenal's longest-running and deepest rivalries is with their nearest major neighbours, Tottenham Hotspur, with matches between the two being referred to as the North London derby.

Arsenal also have a rivalry with West London club Chelsea, which is also considered a major derby. In addition, a strong on-pitch rivalry with Manchester United dates back to the late 1980s, which intensified in the 1990s as both clubs began often competing for the Premier League title.

A 2003 online survey found that Arsenal supporters most dislike Tottenham, followed by Manchester United and Chelsea. Between 2022 and 2024, Arsenal's rivalry with Manchester City on the field also grew stronger as the teams often competed for the top spots in the Premier League.

== Traditions ==
=== St. Totteringham's Day ===
Saint Totteringham's Day is a concept created in 2002 and first published on the fan website arseweb.com. It is the day when Arsenal have gathered sufficient points to be mathematically assured to finish ahead of Tottenham in the league table. In 2007, the concept was first mentioned (mistakenly as 'St. Totteridge') in an Arsenal official match programme although there are suggestions that it has existed since 2005. St. Totteringham's day 2010 was the first time the celebration was acknowledged by mainstream media, with mentions from the BBC, and The Guardian newspapers.

The unofficial 'holiday' did not occur from 2017 to 2022; Spurs' 2–0 win over Arsenal in April 2017 ensured that Tottenham would finish above Arsenal in the league for the first time in 22 years. In April 2023 Arsenal's 3–3 draw with Southampton mathematically confirmed their higher league finish ending the 6-year run without finishing above Spurs.

March 1, 2026 was the earliest ever St. Totteringham's Day. Tottenham's 2-1 loss to Fulham guaranteed they could not finish higher than Arsenal. It only took only 28 matches, which tied the record for joint lowest number of matches for St. Totteringham's Day with the Invincibles' season in 2003-04.

The website Whenissttotteringhamsday.com predicts when the day will occur during the current Premier League season, and has archives of every St. Totteringham's Day since the formation of the English Premier League.

=== Yellow ribbon symbolism ===
Wearing a yellow ribbon, or symbolism pertaining to yellow ribbons or the colour yellow is a tradition often associated with Arsenal playing at Wembley Stadium (or other cup finals). It is thought to have originated in the 1950s and 70s, when Arsenal had considerable successes reaching the FA Cup Final. As a nod to Arsenal's iconic yellow kit used, fans sang a rendition of "Round Her Neck She Wears a Yeller Ribbon" as a chant. Originally, a US war poem, first published in 1917, it was popularised in 1949 by the film She Wore a Yellow Ribbon starring John Wayne, where the Andrews Sisters performed the song. Since then, it has been established into fan folklore.

== Incidents ==
Arsenal supporters enjoy good relations with police forces around the country and especially the Metropolitan Police. The club and authorities work closely together to police fans, with both using their available powers where necessary.

Arsenal fans have been involved in a number of incidents of racist and homophobic abuse at matches over the years. They have been accused of making homophobic and racist chants and materials directed at ex-Arsenal left-back Ashley Cole. In 2018, Arsenal announced an investigation into "discriminatory and violent" behaviour by fans during a match against rivals Tottenham Hotspur. Fans were alleged to have hissed (a reference to the gas chambers used during the Holocaust) and chanted about "gassing Jews". Antisemitic abuse has been a longstanding issue at matches involving Arsenal and Tottenham, as the latter have historic links with North London's Jewish community. It was reported in 2006 that Arsenal fans had also been criticised for continued use of the word "Yid" in chants.

A 2021 investigation found that Granit Xhaka had been racially abused by Arsenal season ticket holders online. The same study found that Hector Bellerin was targeted with homophobic abuse. Former Arsenal player Emmanuel Adebayor claimed he was racially abused by fans with a chant about his dad "washing elephants" after he transferred to Manchester City. In 2019 Arsenal announced an investigation into racist abuse directed at Napoli player Kalidou Koulibaly after a Snapchat video shot during the Europa League match showed a fan using the n-word; the club pledged to find and ban the culprit. An AFTV pundit was dismissed from the channel after he referred to South Korean Tottenham player Son Heung-min as a "DVD", a racial slur that is a reference to selling illegal discs. Wilfried Zaha of Crystal Palace said he received racist abuse and threats to his family on social media after he was accused of diving to win a penalty during a 2–2 draw with Arsenal. In February 2013 the Football Association launched a probe into allegations that an Arsenal fan had racially abused Newcastle United's Cheick Tiote.

Fans of Arsenal and Manchester United were singled out for criticism after being recorded chanting sexist abuse at Chelsea's female club doctor Eva Carneiro during matches.

== Support outside the United Kingdom ==
Arsenal is one of the most popular Premier League clubs in the world.

=== Africa ===
Arsenal supporter in Uganda

Arsenal and Chelsea are the most supported football clubs in Africa. Arsenal are the most popular club in East and North Africa, with Twitter research from 2015 conducted by the BBC finding that Arsenal were the most popular club in Algeria, Ethiopia, Kenya, Malawi, Morocco, Nigeria, Tanzania, Tunisia and Uganda.

=== Oceania ===
==== Australia ====
Arsenal is one of the most popular Premier League clubs in Australia. While the men's team has had only a few Australian players (for example Socceroos captain, Mathew Ryan), the women's team has a strong history of recruiting Australian players: Steph Catley, Kyra Cooney-Cross and Caitlin Foord. Arsenal's men's and women's teams have played in Australia before, most recently in 2024 when Arsenal Women played the A-Leagues All Stars Women at Marvel Stadium in Melbourne, winning 1–0.

===== Arsenal Australia =====
Arsenal Australia is the official Arsenal supporters' group in Australia. It has branches in each state and territory except for Tasmania and the Australian Capital Territory (ACT). The state with the largest amount of Arsenal fans is New South Wales.

Arsenal Australia branches
Branch	Area served	Meeting pub	Suburb
Adelaide Gooners	Adelaide	The Arkaba	Fullarton
Brisbane Gooners	Brisbane	Pig 'n' Whistle Riverside	Brisbane CBD
Brisbane Gooners	Brisbane	Jimmy's on the Mall	Brisbane CBD
Central Coast Gooners	Central Coast	Sideliners Sports Grill	Erina
Darwin Gooners	Darwin	The Sportsbar at Mindil Beach Casino & Resort	Darwin City
Melbourne Gooners	Melbourne	The Crafty Squire	Melbourne CBD
Perth Gooners	Perth	The Globe Hotel	Perth CBD
Sydney Gooners	Sydney	Molly Malone's Irish Tavern	Surry Hills

== Notable supporters ==
Below is a list of well-known people who are or were Arsenal supporters:

=== Royalty ===
- Olav V of Norway

=== Entertainment ===
==== Actors and actresses ====
- Adewale Akinnuoye-Agbaje
- Alfie Allen
- Brian Cox
- Jamie Bell
- Paul Blackthorne
- Louise Brealey
- Saffron Burrows
- John Challis
- Gemma Chan
- Joan Collins
- Kevin Costner
- Charlie Cox
- Benedict Cumberbatch
- Phil Davis
- Adrian Dunbar
- Idris Elba
- Tom Felton
- Matthew Fox
- Nicholas Galitzine
- Andrew Garfield
- Rupert Graves
- Esha Gupta
- Ben Hardy
- Anne Hathaway
- Charlie Heaton
- Tom Hiddleston
- Saffron Hocking
- Brendan Hunt
- Kim Kardashian
- Gary Kemp
- Martin Kemp
- Val Kilmer
- Hugh Laurie
- Matt Lucas
- Kate Mara
- Neil Maskell
- Xelia Mendes-Jones
- Jonathan Rhys Meyers
- Demi Moore
- Alan Parker
- Disha Patani
- Robert Pattinson
- Anna Popplewell
- Will Poulter
- Freddie Prinze Jr.
- Daisy Ridley
- Patrick Robinson
- Linda Robson
- Tom Rosenthal
- David Schneider
- David Schwimmer
- Kaya Scodelario
- Andy Serkis
- Ranveer Singh
- Kyle Soller
- David Soul
- Dan Stevens
- Mark Strong
- Josh Tedeku
- Bradley Walsh
- Ashley Walters
- Micheal Ward
- Tom Watt
- Barbara Windsor
- Reese Witherspoon
- Letitia Wright

==== Music ====
- 21 Savage
- Akala
- Natalie Appleton (All Saints)
- Nicole Appleton (All Saints)
- Yxng Bane
- Maleek Berry
- Bernard Butler (Suede)
- Clem Cattini
- Celeste
- Jared Champion (Cage the Elephant)
- Chip
- Harry Christophers
- Sean Combs
- Joel Corry
- Joy Crookes
- Timi Dakolo
- Roger Daltrey (The Who)
- Dappy
- Dave Davies (The Kinks)
- Ray Davies (The Kinks)
- Dels
- Dido
- Alesha Dixon (Mis-Teeq)
- DJ Fresh
- Fireboy DML
- Louis Dunford
- Steve Earle
- Eliza Doolittle
- Ella Eyre
- Josh Franceschi (You Me at Six)
- Ghetts
- JB Gill (JLS)
- David Gilmour (Pink Floyd)
- Jess Glynne
- Martin Gore (Depeche Mode)
- Professor Green
- Tony Hadley (Spandau Ballet)
- Mick Jagger (The Rolling Stones)
- Jammer
- Jay-Z
- Jazzie B
- J Hus
- Judge Jules
- Juls
- Khaligraph Jones
- John Keeble (Spandau Ballet)
- KiDi
- Labrinth
- Lethal Bizzle
- Leona Lewis
- Dua Lipa
- Little Simz
- Chris Lowe (Pet Shop Boys)
- John Lydon (Sex Pistols, Public Image Ltd)
- Mabel
- Mahalia
- Ella Mai
- Talia Mar
- Rae Morris
- Aston Merrygold (JLS)
- MoStack
- Su-Elise Nash
- Grant Nicholas (Feeder)
- Nines
- Odumodublvck
- Osh
- Nerina Pallot
- Mikill Pane
- Passenger
- Patoranking
- Maisie Peters
- Plan B
- Kojey Radical
- Rapman
- Rihanna
- Sarkodie
- Tiwa Savage
- Chris Shiflett (Foo Fighters)
- Nafe Smallz
- Stacey Solomon
- Marcel Somerville
- Sharleen Spiteri (Texas)
- Cat Stevens
- Rachel Stevens
- Rod Stewart
- Swarmz
- The Game
- Tinie Tempah
- Pete Tong
- Simon Townshend (The Who)
- Blak Twang
- Untold
- Roger Waters (Pink Floyd)
- Banky W.
- Tim Wheeler (Ash)
- Wizkid
- Wretch 32
- Yizzy

==== Internet personalities ====
- Steve Alvarez Brown
- ChrisMD
- Chunkz
- KSI

==== Television and radio personalities ====
- Jeremy Beadle
- Jacquie Beltrao
- Melvyn Bragg
- Nick Bright
- Alex Brooker
- Steve Bunce
- Sarah-Jane Crawford
- David Frost
- Freddie Highmore
- Greg James
- Aled Jones
- Roman Kemp
- Dominic Laurie
- Davina McCall
- Piers Morgan
- Dermot Murnaghan
- Dermot O'Leary
- Robert Peston
- Jon Ronson
- Jack Saunders
- Najwa Shihab
- Robert Winston
- Dale Winton
- Laura Woods
- Reggie Yates

==== Directors and producers ====
- Sean Durkin
- Gale Anne Hurd
- Atul Kasbekar
- Spike Lee
- Sam Mendes
- Michael Moore
- Kyle Newman
- Ben Winston

==== Comedians ====
- Rob Beckett
- Dara Ó Briain
- Alan Davies
- Hugh Dennis
- Adam Friedland
- Mo Gilligan
- Milton Jones
- Paul Kaye
- Patrick Marber
- Chris Martin
- Rory McGrath
- Romesh Ranganathan
- Ian Stone
- Jack Whitehall
- White Yardie
- Bilal Zafar

==== Writers ====
- Paul Gilroy
- Maurice Gran
- Nick Hornby
- Simon Jenkins
- Erling Kagge
- Laurence Marks
- Michael Rosen
- Charles Simić

=== Athletes and sports ===
==== Footballers ====
- Tammy Abraham
- Gareth Bale
- Jack Aitchison
- David Alaba
- Romeo Beckham
- Darren Bent
- Christian Benteke
- Dennis Bergkamp (Note: All former Arsenal players.)
- Kevin-Prince Boateng
- Alessandro Costacurta
- Denilson
- Matt Doherty
- Eberechi Eze
- Eduardo
- Björn Engels
- Mathieu Flamini
- Charlie George
- Serge Gnabry
- Joe Gomez
- Karlan Grant
- Andre Gray
- Perry Groves
- Eden Hazard
- Tobin Heath
- Thierry Henry
- Morten Hjulmand
- Timo Horn
- Hulk
- Víctor Ibarbo
- Andy Impey
- Carl Jenkinson
- Leon Knight
- Mikele Leigertwood
- Josh Maja
- Diego Maradona
- Jackson Martínez
- Per Mertesacker
- Henrikh Mkhitaryan
- Joe Montemurro
- Ravel Morrison
- Mykhailo Mudryk
- Casey Nogueira
- Henry Onyekuru
- Alex Oxlade-Chamberlain
- Emmanuel Petit
- Krzysztof Piątek
- Florentin Pogba
- Paul Pogba
- Ferenc Puskás
- Nile Ranger
- Micah Richards
- Emile Smith Rowe
- Antonio Rüdiger
- Mathew Ryan
- Becky Sauerbrunn
- George Saunders
- Tim Sherwood
- Chris Smalling
- Daniel Sturridge
- Corentin Tolisso
- Matt Turner
- Ollie Watkins
- Arsène Wenger
- Leah Williamson
- Jack Wilshere
- Jonas Wind
- Ian Wright
- Wilfried Zaha
- Oleksandr Zinchenko

==== American football players ====
- Jay Ajayi
- Chad Johnson
- Christian McCaffrey
- Adam Thielen

==== Basketball players ====
- Giannis Antetokounmpo
- Carmelo Anthony
- OG Anunoby
- Eric Boateng
- Matt Bonner
- Jaylen Brown
- Luol Deng
- Joel Embiid
- James Harden
- Nikola Jokić
- Dirk Nowitzki
- Josh Richardson
- Jeremy Sochan

==== Boxers ====
- Dan Azeez
- Cheavon Clarke
- Henry Cooper
- James DeGale
- Audley Harrison
- Joe Joyce
- Billy Joe Saunders
- Hamzah Sheeraz
- Michael Watson
- Anthony Yarde

==== Cricketers ====
- James Anderson (Note: Other sources cite James Anderson as being a fan of Burnley F.C..)
- Nick Compton
- Rahul Dravid
- Nasser Hussain
- Adam Lyth
- Monty Panesar
- KL Rahul
- Mark Ramprakash
- Darren Sammy
- Virender Sehwag
- Sarah Taylor
- Phil Tufnell

==== eSports players ====
- Olof "olofmeister" Gustafsson

==== Golfers ====
- Andrew Johnston
- Ian Poulter

==== Horse racing jockeys ====
- Frankie Dettori
- Tony McCoy

==== Professional wrestling ====
- Mariah May

==== Racing cyclists ====
- Remco Evenepoel
- Tao Geoghegan Hart
- Geraint Thomas
- Sir Bradley Wiggins

==== Racing drivers ====
- Sir Lewis Hamilton
- Gary Paffett

==== Tennis players ====
- Harriet Dart
- Andy Murray

==== Track and field athletes ====
- Sir Mo Farah
- Allyson Felix
- Shelly-Ann Fraser-Pryce
- Jeanette Kwakye
- Tosin Oke
- David Oliver
- David Rudisha
- Perri Shakes-Drayton
- Kelly Sotherton

==== Other athletes ====
- Nicklas Bäckström
- Ashleigh Ball
- Brad Barritt
- Will Bayley
- Gordon D'Arcy
- Harriet Dart
- Alfie Davis
- Nathan French
- Dominic Inglot
- Maro Itoje
- Artturi Lehkonen
- Harry Martin
- Marc McCarroll
- Ugo Monye
- Francis Ngannou
- Ronnie O'Sullivan
- Rob Richardson
- Matt Riddle
- Chris Robshaw
- Moe Sbihi
- Peter Svidler
- Warren Tredrea
- James Ward
- Peter Waterfield
- David Weir
- Bobby White
- Andrey Esipenko
- Connor McDavid

==== Other sporting figures ====
- Jonathan Barnett
- Karren Brady
- Kia Joorabchian
- Frank Warren

=== Politicians ===
- Diane Abbott
- Abdullah of Pahang
- Jennette Arnold
- Adama Barrow
- John Bercow
- Fidel Castro
- Sir Nick Clegg
- Jeremy Corbyn
- Gautam Gambhir
- Sam Gyimah
- François Hollande
- Paul Kagame
- Aleksander Kwaśniewski
- Zohran Mamdani
- David Miliband
- Raila Odinga
- Priti Patel
- Chris Patten
- Kevin Rudd
- Babajide Sanwo-Olu
- Keir Starmer
- Abdul El-Sayed

=== Academics ===
- George Carey
- David Pannick KC

=== Other individuals ===
- Ronnie Biggs
- Osama bin Laden
- Richard Blais
- Raymond Blanc
- Claude Callegari
- Dainton Connell
- Daniel Ek
- Atique Choudhury
- Ainsley Harriott
- Doug Hayward
- J. P. McManus
- Maria Petri
- Marcus Samuelsson

== See also ==
- AFTV - YouTube fan channel
- Arsenal Supporters' Trust
