= AFTV =

YouTube channel aimed at Arsenal F.C. supporters

YouTube information
- Channel: AFTV
- Years active: 2012–present
- Genre: Sports
- Subscribers: 1.74 million
- Views: 1.69 billion
- Last updated: 30th June 2025

AFTV (formerly known as ArsenalFanTV) is a football fan YouTube channel and website directed at supporters of Arsenal F.C. Based in London, England, the channel was created in 2012 and includes fan interviews, previews and reviews of players. They have interviewed players such as Olivier Giroud, Ian Wright and Thierry Henry.

== History ==
The channel was created in October 2012 and was founded by former BBC reggae radio host Robbie Lyle; Lyle had worked as a surveyor before quitting his job to work on ArsenalFanTV full-time. He created the channel with his cameraman "Tao" who had also quit his job to pursue a career on YouTube.

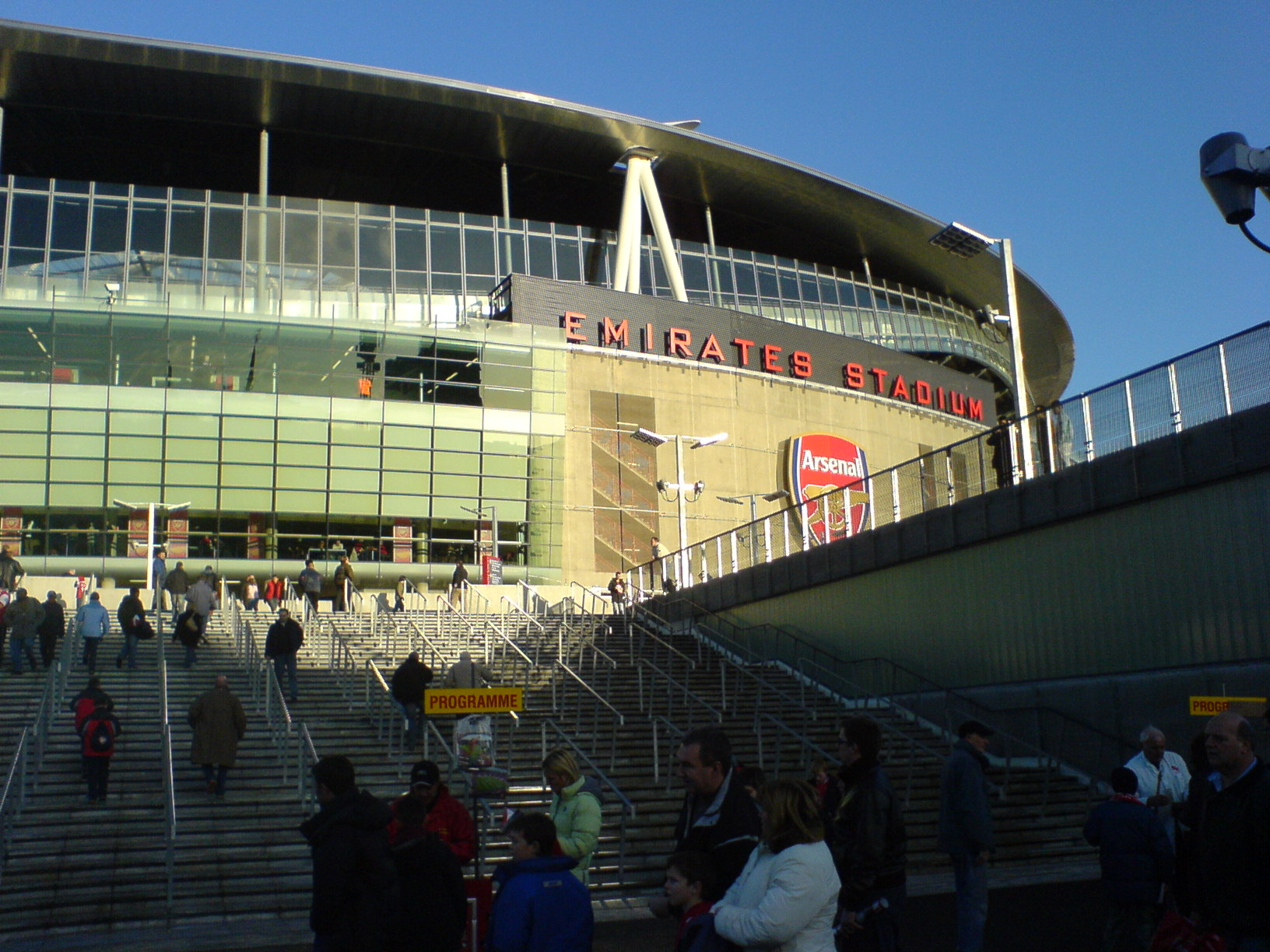
AFTV film their interviews outside the Emirates Stadium after Arsenal's home games

Their first fan interviews were conducted after Arsenal's 5–2 win against Tottenham Hotspur, Arsenal's local rivals. When asked by Vice why he created the channel, Lyle said that "We've all had enough of the so-called pundits, most of whom aren't even at the games. So I started my own channel to hear from the real fans, with real opinions. That was my aim with the site". ArsenalFanTV pioneered the concept of supporter-led TV or "Fan TV", which has led to other club supporters creating similar channels on YouTube.

Since its creation, the channel has continued to provide viewers with fan interviews and content about Arsenal on social media but its rise in the YouTube community occurred as a result of the many viral videos it had posted from fan interviews. The channel has uploaded several videos of angry rants from supporters directed at the club's ownership, some of which include Chris Hudson's rant after the loss to Aston Villa in 2013 and Troopz in 2017 following Arsenal's 5–1 defeat to Bayern Munich in the Champions League.

Much of the anger from supporters on the channel was directed towards former manager Arsène Wenger, who many believed should have resigned following his long tenure at the football club, especially during the 2016–17 season in which there was a divide among Arsenal fans, with a minority being "Wenger In" and a majority being "Wenger Out". There has also been criticism towards major shareholder Stan Kroenke who many Arsenal fans believe should sell his shares to the next major shareholder Alisher Usmanov following claims of his lack of desire towards the club and comments made by Kroenke himself stating that he "didn't buy Arsenal stakes to win trophies". This was referenced on BT Sport by the former England international Rio Ferdinand when he mentioned the frustration of Arsenal supporters with Wenger on ArsenalFanTV in 2016.

On 20 April 2018, Channel 4 premiered a new late-night football show called The Real Football Fan Show hosted by Lyle and featuring many ArsenalFanTV regulars. In March 2020, Lyle was also the subject of an ITV documentary entitled Robbie Lyle: Football Fans Under Their Skin in which he discusses racism within football and the experiences of black football supporters.

== Notable contributors ==
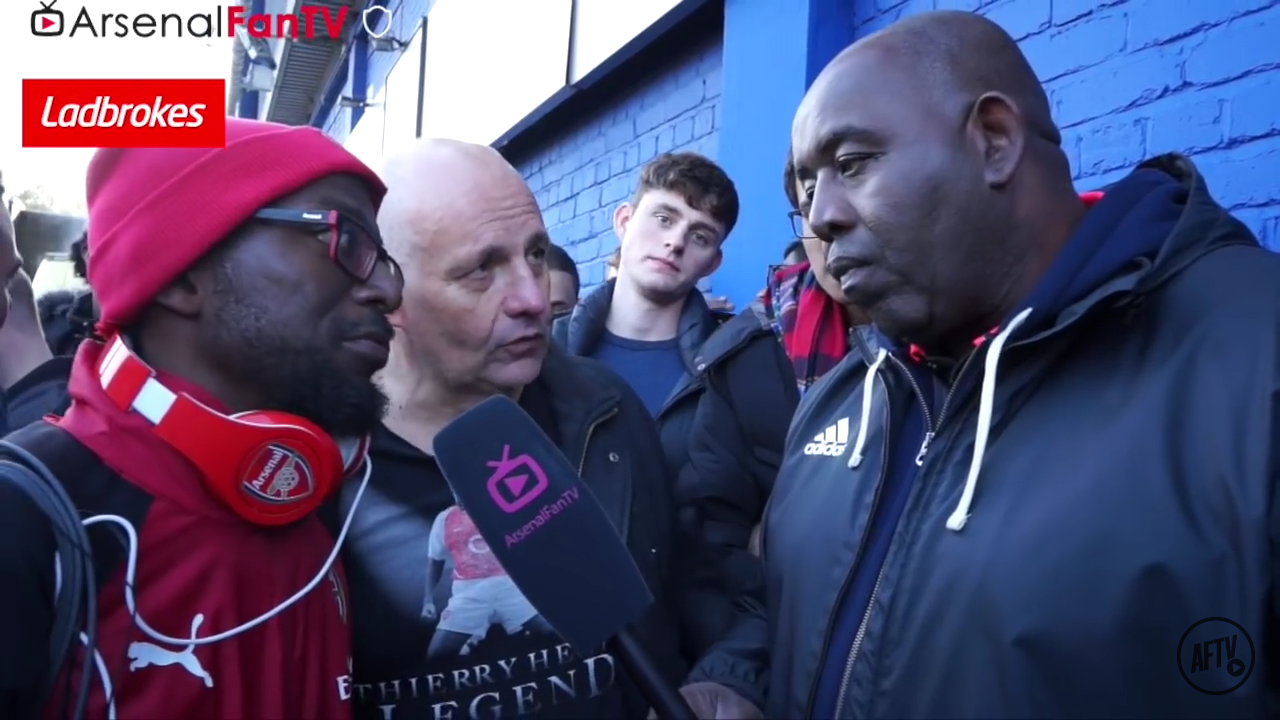
From left to right (foreground): Ty, Claude and Robbie in 2017

Although the channel interviews a variety of Arsenal supporters after every game, there are a few supporters who are regularly interviewed by Robbie Lyle and are well known by many of the channel's viewers.

=== Current ===
- "Ty" (Taiwo Ogunlabi): Seen as optimistic and is well known for his support of Arsène Wenger. He constantly defended Wenger during his tenure as manager despite facing growing opposition from supporters and is often labelled as "delusional".
- Lee Judges: A lifelong Arsenal supporter, Lee has given several passionate rants about the demise of Arsenal under Wenger.
- "White Yardie" (Harry Gregory): A comedian originally from Black River, Jamaica, he joined the channel following Troopz's departure in November 2020.

=== Former ===
- Claude Callegari: An outspoken critic of Arsène Wenger, he is famous for saying "It's time to go!" about Wenger. In July 2020, he was removed as a contributor after making a racist remark about Tottenham Hotspur player Heung-Min Son during a livestream. He died on 29 March 2021, aged 58.
- "Troopz" (Aumar Hamilton): Another vocal critic of Wenger, Troopz is known for his use of multicultural London English words such as "blud" and "fam". In September 2020, Troopz announced his departure from AFTV to join Barstool Sports in New York City although he continued to appear on the channel until November 2020. He has since made occasional appearances on AFTV.
- “DT” (Liam Goodenough): A vocal critic of Wenger, DT is also known for his angry rants whenever Arsenal lose and has been responsible for placing many "Wenger Out" banners at Arsenal matches. In January 2022, AFTV announced that he had been permanently banned from appearing on the channel after being sentenced to 3 years in prison.

== Controversies ==
=== 2017 ===
Lawrence Tallis, the creative director of Big Balls Films (which launched COPA90), questioned whether many viewers were watching the channel for analysis of Arsenal or the entertainment. Similarly, former Manchester United player and Sky Sports pundit Gary Neville criticised Arsenal fans who appeared on the channel for being too harsh on Wenger. "I was watching Arsenal fans slating and slanging into him, and I thought, 'he doesn't deserve that'". ArsenalFanTV later extended an invitation for Neville to discuss his comments on the channel, which he accepted. After Arsenal's 2–2 draw against Manchester City in April 2017, many Arsenal supporters attempted to attack Robbie as well as other regulars such as Claude.

That same month, ArsenalFanTV came under criticism for a video they posted in association with The Sun newspaper. The video, which featured Lyle, DT and Ty, received backlash from many football fans, especially Liverpool supporters, who have boycotted The Sun due to its controversial reporting of the 1989 Hillsborough disaster which killed 97 Liverpool fans, which included allegations of Liverpool fans urinating on police officers and pickpocketing dying supporters. Liverpool had recently banned the newspaper from attending press conferences and Everton followed suit following an article posted about Ross Barkley which had compared him to a gorilla and was considered offensive due to his grandfather's Nigerian heritage. In response to the criticism, Lyle appeared on the Ball Street YouTube channel and apologised to the people of Liverpool for any offence that was taken and has promised to not work with the tabloid in the future with the video having since been deleted from the channel.

Following Arsenal's 2–0 defeat to Tottenham in April 2017, Lyle was escorted out of White Hart Lane with police protection after being abused by many Tottenham fans and was unable to film ArsenalFanTV after that match. In a video afterwards, Lyle stated that much of the abuse he received was racist and was not something he experienced for years. Tottenham Hotspur condemned any racial abuse and was working with the Metropolitan Police on the issue.

=== 2018 ===
In August 2018, ArsenalFanTV were forced to change their name to AFTV following discussions with Arsenal regarding the channel breaching Arsenal's copyright by using the term "Arsenal" without authorisation which harmed the club. Some media outlets claimed Arsenal had issued a cease and desist letter against ArsenalFanTV, however, they confirmed this was not true.

=== 2020 ===
In July 2020, contributor Claude Callegari made a racial slur about South Korean Tottenham Hotspur player Heung-Min Son during a livestream, referring to him as a DVD. This has been considered a racial slur since at least 2005, referencing the large number of Asian people who sell DVDs around the East London area. After making a video on the platform alongside Lyle in which the issue was discussed but no apology was given, channel sponsor Harry's stated that they would no longer be working with AFTV. Following this, AFTV announced that Callegari would be removed from the channel "indefinitely". During the same livestream, contributor Troopz commented that “Harry Kane is white so he must be right”; despite this, no action was taken against Troopz.

In August 2020, AFTV was criticised during a livestream of the 2020 FA Cup Final after some fans celebrated when Chelsea player Christian Pulisic was injured and had to be taken off.

== See also ==
- Arsenal Supporters' Trust
