= Norbury =

Area of south London, England

Coordinates: 51.4092°N 0.1083°W

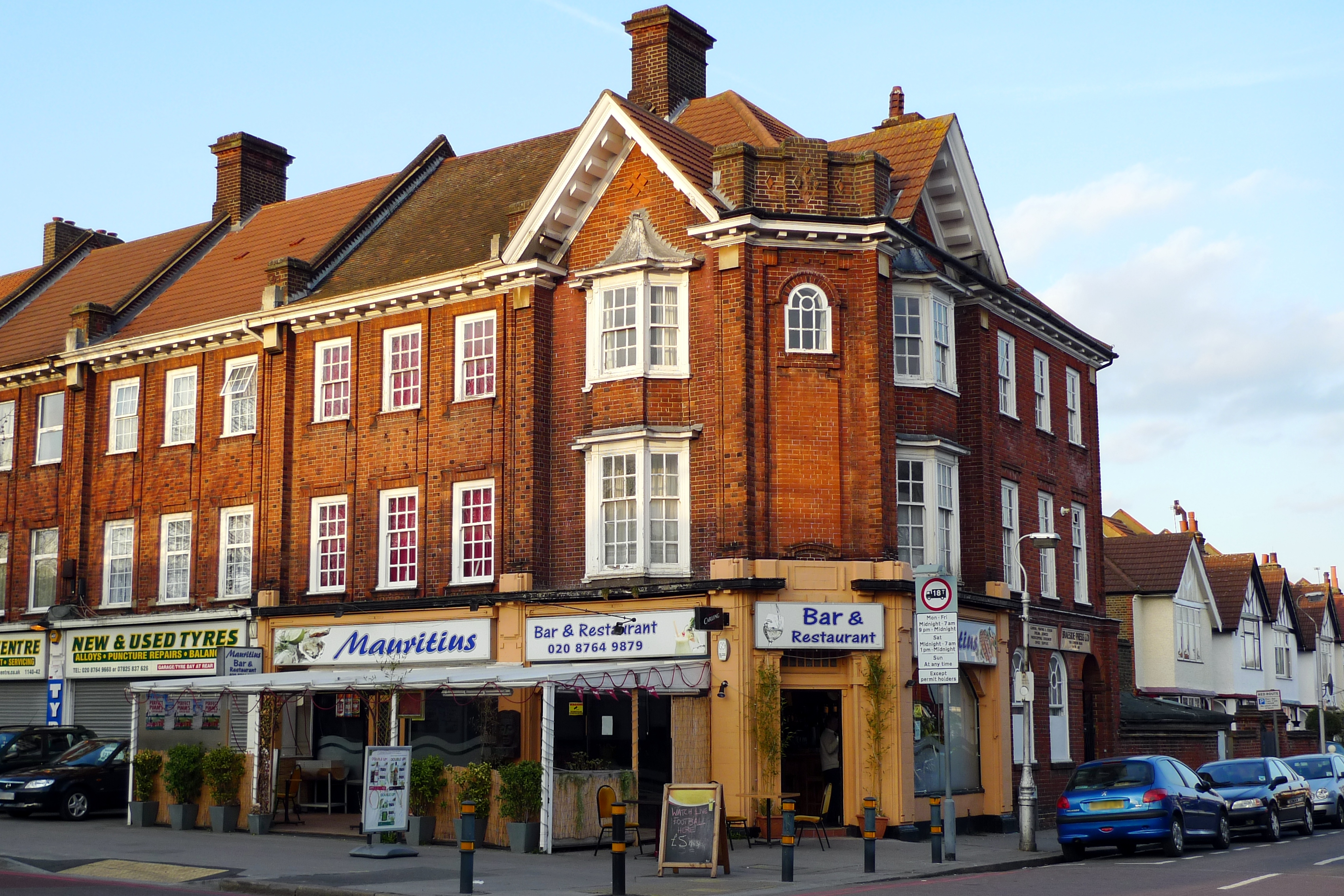

- Location within Greater London
- Population: 16,476 (2011 Census, Norbury ward)
- OS grid reference: TQ315695
- London borough: Croydon; Lambeth
- Ceremonial county: Greater London
- Region: London
- Country: England
- Sovereign state: United Kingdom
- Post town: LONDON
- Postcode district: SW16
- Dialling code: 020
- Police: Metropolitan
- Fire: London
- Ambulance: London
- UK Parliament: Streatham and Croydon North Croydon West
- London Assembly: Croydon and Sutton; Lambeth and Southwark

Norbury is a town and suburb in south London. It shares the postcode London SW16 with neighbouring Streatham. The area is mainly in the borough of Croydon, with some parts extending into the neighbouring borough of Lambeth. Norbury is 6.7 miles (10.8 km) south of Charing Cross.

== Etymology ==
The name Norbury derives from North Burh, (North Borough). Some local histories note that this was due to Norbury's position on the northern boundary of the former Manor of Croydon. Others state that it takes its name from a split in the borough of Bensham, one of the former seven "boroughs" (i.e. tithings) of Croydon. "Northbenchesham" became the Northborough, then Norbury; "Southbenchesham" later became Thornton Heath.

== History ==
For most of its history Norbury was rural countryside through which the London to Brighton Way Roman road passed. At Hepworth Road, the intact road, 32 feet wide, was excavated in 1961. Remnants of a metalled ford across the stream were found further south at Hermitage Bridge on the River Graveney which forms part of the boundary between Norbury and Streatham, before flowing on to the River Wandle, then the River Thames.

=== Norbury Manor ===
By the early thirteenth century, Norbury was a sub-manor within the chief manor of Croydon. The first recorded mention of Norbury Manor was in 1229 when Peter de Bendings conveyed the Manor to John de Kemsing and his wife Idonea and is referred to as the "lands stretching out either side of the London Road". In 1269 the Manor comprised 91 acres of arable land in Pollards Hill, 30 acres in Grandon, 55 acres of pasture, 36 acres of heathland, 2 acres of woodland and 17 acres of meadow land. In 1337, Norbury Manor was granted to Nicolas de Carew, who also held neighbouring Beddington Manor. The Carew family remained Lords of the Manor of Norbury until 1859 except for a brief interlude during the reign of Henry VIII. Norbury remained rural and agricultural throughout this period. By 1800 most of the land in Norbury was owned by a handful of people; approximately half was owned by the Carew family, and the remaining large landowners were Peter du Cane, Croydon Hospital and Pembroke College.

=== Victorian period ===
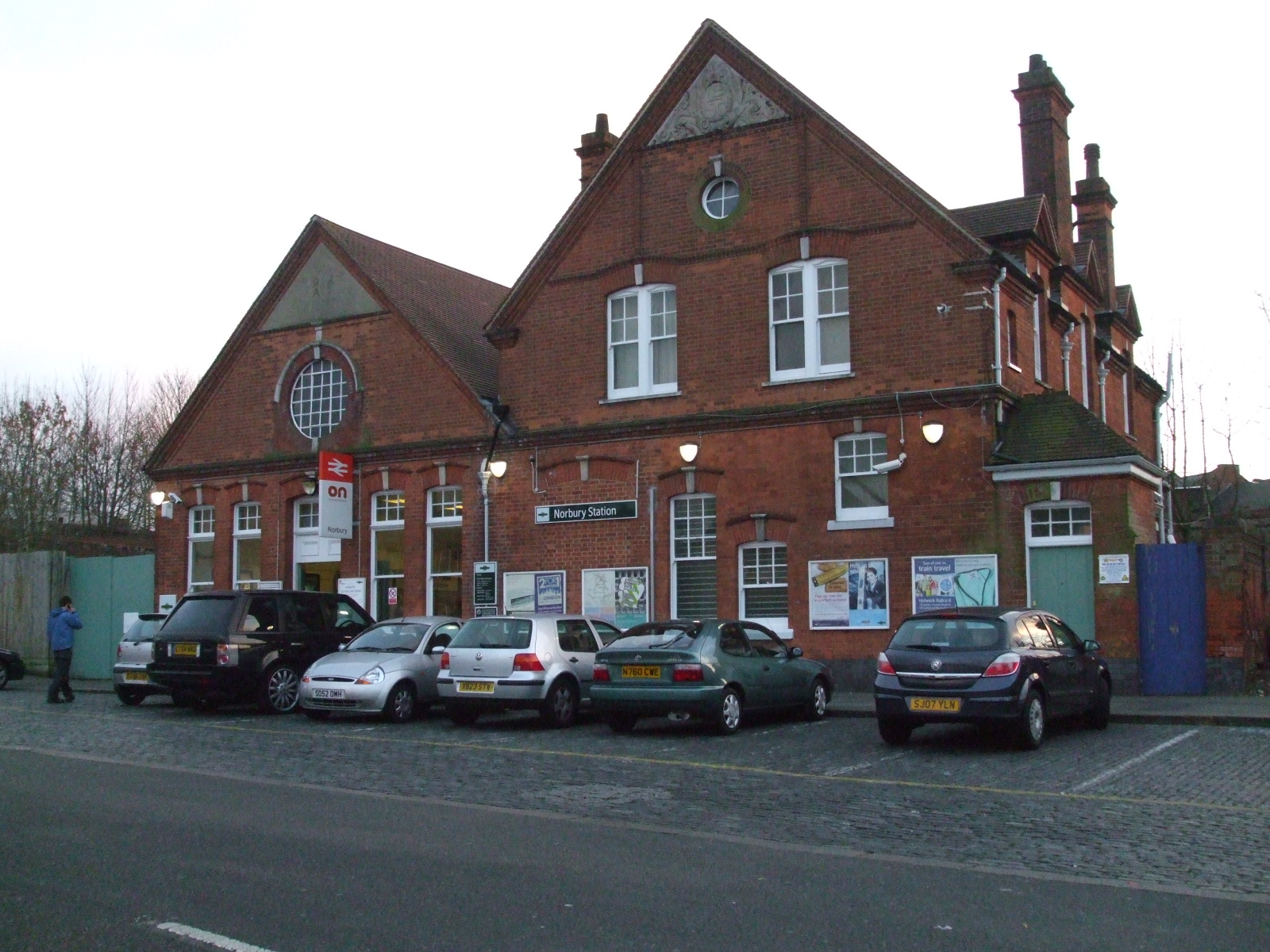
Norbury railway station

At the start of the Victorian period, the population consisted of fifty six people and three main dwellings; the Hermitage, Norbury Manor Farm House and Norbury Hall. The Hermitage was situated alongside Green Lane and backed onto Hermitage Sports Ground (now Norbury Park). The last resident of The Hermitage was Jenny Hill, a famous music hall performer in the 1890s. In 1894 the North Surrey Golf Club built a 90-acre golf club on Hermitage Sports Ground and in 1896 purchased The Hermitage to use as their club house. The following year it was destroyed by fire. Norbury Manor Farm House was situated on the corner where Norbury Avenue meets Kensington Avenue and was the Norbury Manor House until Norbury Hall was built in 1802. The Farm House was demolished in 1914. Only Norbury Hall remains, now used as a retirement home and protected as a Grade II listed building.

In 1859, the first Victorian villa, known as Norbury Villa, was built on the London Road. A second villa followed in 1878, and thereafter followed the construction of clusters of large villas along both sides of the London Road. In 1867, the Committee of Croydon Steeple Chase and Hurdle Races leased approximately 100 acres at Lonesome Farm. The following year, the first Streatham Horse Race meeting was held and a temporary grandstand was built on Northborough Road. The two day meets, held four or five times a year, proved successful and attracted large crowds from London. To cater for the crowds, Norbury railway station opened in 1878, built on a railway line which had run through Norbury since 1862. The increased crowds however led to an increase in anti-social behaviour, and local residents lobbied politicians to enact a new law in 1879 banning horse racing within ten miles of Westminster, effectively ending the Streatham Races.

=== Urbanisation ===
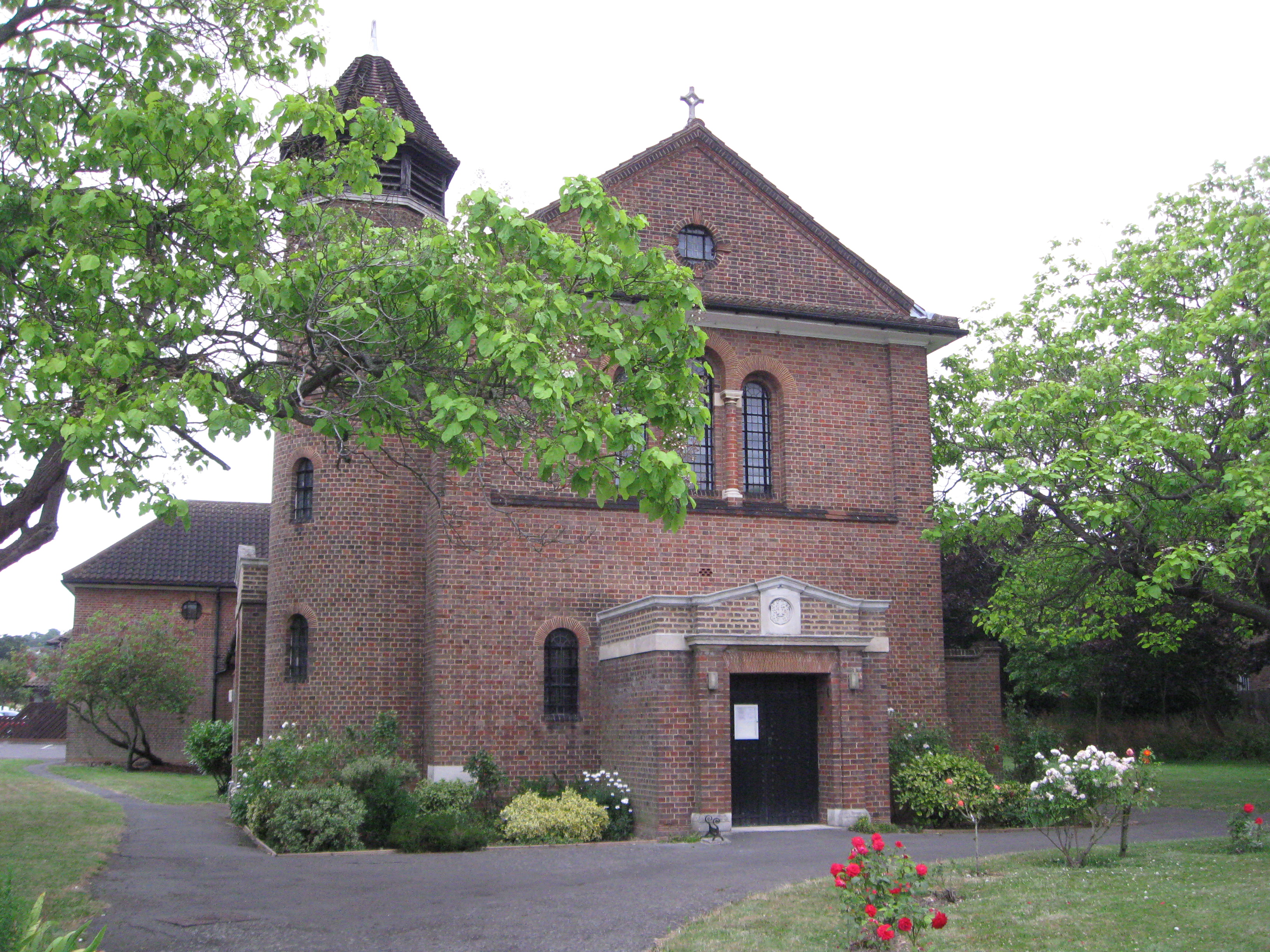
St Oswald's Parish Church

By 1900, Norbury was an affluent semi-rural suburb boasting two golf courses and cricket, football, tennis and bowls clubs. The first shopping parades on the London Road were constructed in 1900 and side roads behind the parades began to be laid out. Electric trams were introduced in 1901 connecting the town to Purley, however as Croydon trams and London trams used different systems and could not use the same tracks, when going to London passengers had to change in Norbury. During the next thirty years most of the housing in Norbury was constructed, with the houses and roads in different areas forming part of several residential estates. The most notable estate was the Norbury Cottage Garden Estate built in 1901 in thirty acres of land between Northborough Road and Semley Road, and which was the first cottage estate built by the London County Council. The population of Norbury had risen from 475 people in 1901 to 15,538 by 1931.

During the second half of the twentieth century, many of the large Victorian villas were demolished and office blocks were built on their sites. Later many of the office blocks were themselves converted into residential apartments. In 1970 Norbury Fire Station was built to replace nearby Streatham Fire Station.

=== Modern Norbury ===
Today, Norbury is a built-up residential area housing a diverse and multi-cultural community. It has a variety of local commerce, with most of Norbury High Street consisting of newsagents and various independent businesses, as well as one or two pubs. It is also very well connected to other areas, such as Crystal Palace, Croydon, Streatham and Central London. Norbury Station is in fare zone 3. Some locals consider the area to be in decline, with increased fly-tipping and anti-social behaviour, and a campaign has been started to reverse these changes.

== Demography ==
In the 2011 census, Norbury was White or White British (37.4%), Asian or Asian British (28%), Black or Black British (24.8%), Mixed/multiple ethnic groups (6.5%), and Other ethnic group (2.2%). The largest single ethnicity is White British (24.1%).

Of those living in Norbury, the most common place of birth is England (55%), followed by India (5%), Pakistan (4%), Jamaica (4%) and Kenya (2%). The main first language spoken is English (76.5%), followed by Polish (4%), Urdu (3.3%) and Gujarati (2.8%).

The largest religious groupings are Christians (52 per cent), then Muslims (17.8 per cent), those of no religion (12.6 per cent), Hindus (7.6 per cent), no response (7.6 per cent), Sikhs (0.9 per cent), other (0.8 per cent), Buddhists (0.5 per cent) and Jews (0.1 per cent).

== Politics ==
Norbury is part of the Streatham and Croydon North constituency and the current MP is the Labour politician Steve Reed. The constituency replaced Croydon North in 2024.

Norbury includes two of the twenty-eight wards which make up Croydon London Borough Council. These two wards, both created in 2018, are Norbury and Pollards Hill and Norbury Park.

=== Norbury and Pollards Hill ===
Norbury and Pollards Hill 2022 (2 seats)
Party	Candidate	Votes	%	±%
Labour Co-op	Leila Ben-Hassel	1,276		
Labour Co-op	Matthew Griffiths	1,152		
Conservative	Tirena Gunter	622		
Conservative	Mike Mogul	495		
Liberal Democrats	Christopher Adams	315		
Green	Cheryl Zimmerman	252		
Green	Larissa Amor	250		
Liberal Democrats	Mark Chalmers	188		
Taking the Initiative	Ghazala Akhtar	101		
Taking the Initiative	Laura Manser	97		
Turnout		2,706	30.96	
Registered electors		8,740		
Labour Co-op hold		Swing		
Labour Co-op hold		Swing		

Norbury and Pollards Hill by election, 14 March 2019
Party	Candidate	Votes	%	±%
Labour	Leila Ben-Hassel	1,379		
Conservative	Tirena Gunter	324		
Independent	Mark O’Grady	162		
Green	Rachel Chance	91		
Duma Polska	Margret Roznerska	72		
Liberal Democrats	Guy Burchett	70		
UKIP	Kathleen Garner	40		
Majority				
Turnout				
Labour hold		Swing		

Norbury and Pollards Hill - 2018 (2 seats)
Party	Candidate	Votes	%	±%
Labour	Maggie Mansell	1,981		
Labour	Shafi Khan	1,934		
Conservative	Calum Bardsley	644		
Conservative	Mike Mogul	638		
Green	Stephen Amor	299		
Green	Cheryl Zimmerman	291		
Majority		1,290	22.29	
Turnout				
Labour hold		Swing		
Labour hold		Swing		

=== Norbury Park ===
Norbury Park - 2022 (2 seats)
Party	Candidate	Votes	%	±%
Labour Co-op	Alisa Flemming*	1,174		
Labour Co-op	Appu Srinivasan	1,164		
Conservative	Blake O'Donnell	776		
Conservative	Kofi Frimpong	709		
Green	Kirsty Bluck	315		
Liberal Democrats	Daniel O'Donovan	256		
Green	Mick Sullivan	197		
Liberal Democrats	James Woodman	189		
Taking the Initiative	Alan Collins	86		
Taking the Initiative	Claudine Lewis	76		
Turnout		2,765	35.33%	
Registered electors		7,826		
Labour hold		Swing		
Labour hold		Swing		

Norbury Park - 2018 (2 seats)
Party	Candidate	Votes	%	±%
Labour	Sherwan Chowdhury	1,730		
Labour	Alisa Flemming	1,697		
Conservative	Blake O'Donnell	1,039		
Conservative	Ola Kolade	976		
Liberal Democrats	Anne Viney	259		
Green	Rebecca Weighell	249		
Green	Graham Jones	199		
Liberal Democrats	Stephen Viney	121		
Majority		658	10.66	
Turnout				
Labour hold		Swing		
Labour hold		Swing		

== Nearest places ==
- Streatham
- Streatham Common
- West Norwood
- Crystal Palace / Upper Norwood
- Mitcham
- Pollards Hill
- Thornton Heath
- Croydon
- Purley

== Notable people and residents ==
- Kingsley Amis (1922–1995), novelist
- Correlli Barnett (1927–2022), military historian
- Derek Bentley (1933–1953), a burglar who was controversially hanged for the death of a police officer in 1952 (subject of the 1991 film Let Him Have It)
- John Bishop (1931–2000), founder Thames Publishing
- Edwy Searles Brooks (1889–1965), novelist
- Samuel Coleridge-Taylor (1875–1912), composer
- John Creasey (1908–1973), detective-story writer
- Dave (David Orobosa Michael Omoregie) (born 1998), rapper
- Janet Francis (born 1947), actress
- Deryck Guyler (1914–1999), actor
- Wee Willie Harris (1933–2023), singer
- Will Hay (1888–1949), comedian and actor
- Libera, boys' choir
- Michael Moorcock (born 1939), writer and musician
- Osh (born 1995), singer
- Robert Prizeman (1952–2021), composer
- Ralph Reader (1903–1982), actor
- Stormzy (born 1993), rapper
- Roxanne Tataei (born 1988), singer

== Nearest railway stations ==
- Norbury railway station
- Mitcham Eastfields railway station
- Streatham Common railway station
- Streatham railway station
- Mitcham Junction railway station
- Thornton Heath railway station

== In fiction ==
Norbury is portrayed in a Sherlock Holmes short story, "The Adventure of the Yellow Face", as one of the few places in which the detective turned out to be wrong regarding his theories (as referenced in the episode "The Six Thatchers" of the BBC television series Sherlock).

Norbury is mentioned in Penelope Fitzgerald's The Beginning of Spring (1988). The character of Nellie Reid, who is central to the plot, but who does not appear until the book's final sentence, is from Norbury; and it is repeatedly mentioned throughout the book in contrast to a very different type of life in Moscow.

Norbury station features in the song "Lesley", from rapper Dave's debut album Psychodrama (2019).
