= Volleyball at the 2012 Summer Paralympics – Men's team rosters =

This article shows the rosters of all participating teams at the men's volleyball tournament at the 2012 Summer Paralympics in London.

== Pool A ==
=== Egypt ===
The following is the Egypt roster in the men's volleyball tournament of the 2012 Summer Paralympics.

Head coach: Mansour El Mohamdy

| № | Name | Date of birth | Position | 2012 club |
|---|---|---|---|---|
| 1 | Hesham Abdelmaksod | 2 February 1975 | M | (Egypt) El Houreya |
| 2 | Tamer Morgan Khalil | 9 March 1971 | WS | (Egypt) El Houreya |
| 3 | Yasser Saad Abd El Wahab Hassan | 14 October 1973 | SE | (Egypt) Police Sports Club Association |
| 4 | Ashraf Zaghloul Abdel Aziz | 24 February 1974 | WS | (Egypt) Police Sports Club Association |
| 5 | Taher Adel Elbahaey | 9 June 1972 | SE | (Egypt) El Houreya |
| 6 | Ahmed Mohammed Soliman Khamis | 12 April 1987 | M | (Egypt) Club Alexandria Petroleum |
| 7 | Ahmed Mohammed Fadl | 1 March 1985 | WS | (Egypt) Club Alexandria Petroleum |
| 8 | Mohamed Ezzeldin Mohamed | 1 September 1992 | WS | (Egypt) Club Alexandria Petroleum |
| 9 | Elsayed Moussa Saad | 28 May 1979 | WS | (Egypt) Police Sports Club Association |
| 10 | Abdel Nabi Ahmed Abdel Latif | 18 June 1972 | L | (Egypt) Police Sports Club Association |
| 12 | Mohamed Ibrahim | 29 March 1979 | M | (Egypt) Police Sports Club Association |

=== Germany ===
The following is the German roster in the men's volleyball tournament of the 2012 Summer Paralympics.

Head coach: Rudi Sonnenbichler

| № | Name | Date of birth | Position | 2012 club |
|---|---|---|---|---|
| 1 | Alexander Schiffler | 20 January 1982 | UN | (Germany) BV Leipzig |
| 3 | Thomas Renger | 19 August 1972 | M | (Germany) TSV Bayer Leverkusen |
| 5 | Stefan Hähnlein | 12 June 1990 | SE | (Germany) TSV Bayer Leverkusen |
| 6 | Sebastian Czpakowski | 12 April 1974 | WS | (Germany) TSV Bayer Leverkusen |
| 7 | Heiko Wiesenthal | 12 February 1975 | OS | (Germany) TSV Bayer Leverkusen |
| 8 | Peter Schlorf | 4 June 1986 | M | (Germany) SSC Berlin |
| 9 | Jürgen Schrapp | 27 July 1974 | WS | (Germany) TSV Bayer Leverkusen |
| 10 | Christoph Herzog | 27 July 1983 | WS | (Germany) BV Leipzig |
| 11 | Barbaros Sayilir | 25 October 1988 | UN | (Germany) TSV Bayer Leverkusen |
| 14 | Torben Schiewe | 11 March 1985 | SE | (Germany) BCV Celle |

=== Great Britain ===
The following is the British roster in the men's volleyball tournament of the 2012 Summer Paralympics.

Head coach: Ian LeGrand

| № | Name | Date of birth | Position | 2012 club |
|---|---|---|---|---|
| 1 | Netra Rana | 9 December 1983 | L | (United Kingdom) Battle Back Phoenix |
| 2 | Justin Phillips | 31 August 1990 | WS | (United Kingdom) Malory Eagles |
| 3 | Samuel Scott | 3 January 1991 | WS | (United Kingdom) FDSW Celtic Dragons |
| 4 | John Munro | 4 May 1972 | M | (United Kingdom) London Lynx |
| 5 | Benjamin Thomas Hall | 18 September 1985 | UN | (United Kingdom) Surrey Gators |
| 6 | John Worrall | 30 March 1983 | UN | (United Kingdom) London Lynx |
| 7 | Robert Richardson | 17 May 1982 | SE | (United Kingdom) Surrey Gators |
| 8 | Anton Raimondo | 17 May 1978 | UN | (United Kingdom) London Lynx |
| 9 | Richard Dobell | 12 August 1967 | SE | (United Kingdom) Malory Eagles |
| 10 | Charles Walker | 28 February 1980 | M | (United Kingdom) Surrey Gators |
| 11 | James Roberts | 11 May 1986 | UN | (United Kingdom) FDSW Celtic Dragons |

=== Morocco ===
The following is the Moroccan roster in the men's volleyball tournament of the 2012 Summer Paralympics.

| № | Name | Date of birth | Position | 2012 club |
|---|---|---|---|---|
| | Rachid Benekri | 19 September 1974 | | |
| 2 | Abderrahim Aniss | 21 December 1976 | SE | (Morocco) ASS Sale |
| 3 | Hicham El Jamili | 11 June 1981 | | (Morocco) ASWT Temara |
| 4 | Khalid Dami | 10 May 1975 | | (Morocco) CMSH Khouribga |
| 5 | Abdelghani El Fitir | 8 February 1973 | | (Morocco) CMSH Khouribga |
| 6 | Mohammed Qouchairi | 21 November 1965 | | (Morocco) ASS Sale |
| 7 | Mohamed Souabi | 31 January 1978 | | (Morocco) AAHS Agadir |
| 8 | Youness Zaaboul | 8 June 1979 | | (Morocco) ASWT Temara |
| 9 | Hicham Aziani | 13 February 1982 | | (Morocco) ASS Sale |
| 10 | Rachid Abdelouafi | 12 April 1978 | L | (Morocco) ASS Sale |
| 11 | Karim Essaadi | 21 October 1983 | | (Morocco) ASS Sale |
| 12 | Khalid Chtaibi | 8 September 1971 | | (Morocco) ASWT Temara |

=== Russia ===
The following is the Russian roster in the men's volleyball tournament of the 2012 Summer Paralympics.

Head coach: Viktor Dyakov

| № | Name | Date of birth | Position | 2012 club |
|---|---|---|---|---|
| 1 | Tanatkan Bukin | 15 January 1967 | UN | (Russia) AVS Rodnik |
| 2 | Sergei Pozdeev | 9 August 1979 | L | (Russia) AVS Rodnik |
| 3 | Viktor Milenin | 20 November 1987 | OS | (Russia) AVS Rodnik |
| 4 | Sergei Yakunin | 27 February 1961 | SE | (Russia) AVS Rodnik |
| 5 | Svyatoslav Kartashev | 10 July 1989 | SE | (Russia) AVS Rodnik |
| 6 | Aleksei Volkov | 14 March 1983 | SE | (Russia) AVS Rodnik |
| 7 | Dmitry Gordienko | 17 October 1975 | WS | (Russia) AVS Rodnik |
| 8 | Evgeny Volosnikov | 24 January 1994 | UN | (Russia) AVS Rodnik |
| 9 | Andrei Lavrinovich | 4 December 1976 | WS | (Russia) AVS Rodnik |
| 11 | Anatoliy Krupin | 5 February 1984 | WS | (Russia) AVS Rodnik |
| 12 | Aleksandr Savichev | 11 March 1989 | OS | (Russia) AVS Rodnik |

== Pool B ==
=== Bosnia and Herzegovina ===
The following is the Bosnian roster in the men's volleyball tournament of the 2012 Summer Paralympics.

Head coach: Mirza Hrustemović

| № | Name | Date of birth | Position | 2012 club |
|---|---|---|---|---|
| 1 | Ismet Godinjak | 17 March 1973 | UN | (Bosnia and Herzegovina) OKI Fantomi |
| 2 | Adnan Manko | 16 January 1977 | UN | (Bosnia and Herzegovina) OKI Fantomi |
| 4 | Adnan Kešmer | 11 October 1986 | L | (Bosnia and Herzegovina) OKI Fantomi |
| 5 | Asim Medić | 3 August 1969 | UN | (Bosnia and Herzegovina) Sdi Spid |
| 6 | Mirzet Duran | 13 October 1986 | UN | (Bosnia and Herzegovina) OKI Fantomi |
| 7 | Nizam Čančar | 17 September 1975 | UN | (Bosnia and Herzegovina) OKI Fantomi |
| 8 | Dževad Hamzić | 4 September 1968 | UN | (Bosnia and Herzegovina) Sdi Spid |
| 9 | Benis Kadrić | 28 January 1987 | UN | (Bosnia and Herzegovina) OKI Fantomi |
| 10 | Safet Alibašić | 21 December 1982 | UN | (Bosnia and Herzegovina) Sdi Spid |
| 11 | Sabahudin Delalić | 17 August 1972 | UN | (Bosnia and Herzegovina) Sdi Spid |
| 12 | Ermin Jusufović | 31 May 1981 | M | (Bosnia and Herzegovina) SKISO "Sinovi Bosne" |

=== Brazil ===
The following is the Brazilian roster in the men's volleyball tournament of the 2012 Summer Paralympics.

| № | Name | Date of birth | Position | 2012 club |
|---|---|---|---|---|
| 1 | Gilberto Lourenco | 22 December 1978 | OS | (Brazil) IBP |
| 2 | Levi Cesar Gomes | 7 January 1973 | WS | (Brazil) CPSP |
| 4 | Carlos Barbosa | 5 September 1970 | OS | (Brazil) Sesi |
| 5 | Daniel Silva | 24 March 1981 | UN | (Brazil) Unilehu |
| 6 | Deivisson Ladeira | 7 November 1982 | UN | (Brazil) CPSP |
| 7 | Rogerio Camargo | 29 January 1976 | UN | (Brazil) CPSP |
| 8 | Giovani de Freitas | 26 March 1971 | UN | (Brazil) CPSP |
| 9 | Wellington Platini | 25 March 1985 | UN | (Brazil) CPSP |
| 10 | Renato Leite | 11 August 1982 | UN | (Brazil) CPSP |
| 11 | Wescley Oliveira | 14 November 1983 | M | (Brazil) Andef |
| 12 | Anderson Ribas | 14 February 1979 | WS | (Brazil) Unilehu |

=== China ===
The following is the Chinese roster in the men's volleyball tournament of the 2012 Summer Paralympics.

Head coach: Liu Fangqing

| № | Name | Date of birth | Position | 2012 club |
|---|---|---|---|---|
| 1 | Tong Jiao | 18 August 1974 | WS | (China) Shanghai Volleyball Team |
| 2 | Shan Sunkui | 12 January 1990 | L | (China) Zhejiang Volleyball Team |
| 3 | Jin Heng | 4 February 1982 | OS | (China) Jiangsu Volleyball Team |
| 5 | Gao Hui | 7 September 1987 | OS | (China) Yunnan Volleyball Team |
| 6 | Wang Shuo | 11 December 1987 | OS | (China) Yunnan Volleyball Team |
| 8 | Zhou Canming | 3 March 1982 | OS | (China) Zhejiang Volleyball Team |
| 9 | Wang Haidong | 30 January 1980 | OS | (China) Shanghai Volleyball Team |
| 10 | Zhao Peiwen | 20 January 1982 | OS | (China) Zhejiang Volleyball Team |
| 11 | Zhang Zhongmin | 25 August 1978 | OS | (China) Liaoning Volleyball Team |
| 12 | Li Lei | 23 March 1991 | OS | (China) Shanghai Volleyball Team |
| 13 | Ding Xiaochao | 13 July 1987 | WS | (China) Shanghai Volleyball Team |

=== Iran ===
The following is the Iranian roster in the men's volleyball tournament of the 2012 Summer Paralympics.

Head coach: Hadi Rezaei

| № | Name | Date of birth | Position | 2012 club |
|---|---|---|---|---|
| 2 | Majid Lashgarisanami | 6 August 1979 | UN | (Iran) Gostareshe Foulad |
| 3 | Reza Peidayesh | 5 September 1978 | WS | (Iran) Dokhaniyat |
| 4 | Davood Alipourian | 6 May 1985 | SE | (Iran) Zob Ahan |
| 5 | Ahmad Eiri | 21 March 1988 | M | (Iran) Gostareshe Foulad |
| 6 | Naser Hassanpour Alinazari | 30 March 1974 | UN | (Iran) Gonbad |
| 7 | Sadegh Bigdeli | 26 February 1984 | WS | (Iran) Gostareshe Foulad |
| 8 | Jalil Eimery | 21 September 1972 | SE | (Iran) Zob Ahan |
| 9 | Seyedsaeid Ebrahimibaladezaei | 1 July 1979 | OS | (Iran) Zob Ahan |
| 10 | Isa Zirahi | 4 June 1979 | OS | (Iran) Zob Ahan |
| 11 | Ramezan Salehi Hajikolaei | 11 March 1979 | L | (Iran) Zob Ahan |
| 12 | Mohammad Khaleghi | 23 October 1981 | SE | (Iran) Gostareshe Foulad |

=== Rwanda ===
The following is the Rwandan roster in the men's volleyball tournament of the 2012 Summer Paralympics.

| № | Name | Date of birth | Position | 2012 club |
|---|---|---|---|---|
| 1 | Dominique Bizimana | 20 July 1976 | | (Rwanda) Intwari Handisport Club |
| 2 | James Rutikanga | 13 December 1990 | | (Rwanda) Intwari Handisport Club |
| 3 | Vincent Tuyisenge | 8 April 1983 | | (Rwanda) THT Nyarugenge |
| 4 | Jean Rukundo | 1 January 1964 | | (Rwanda) HVP Gatagara |
| 6 | Jean Baptiste Murema | 2 June 1982 | | (Rwanda) Intwari Handisport Club |
| 7 | Callixte Twagirayezu | 28 August 1975 | | (Rwanda) Intwari Handisport Club |
| 8 | Jean Bosco Ngizwenimana | 1 January 1983 | | (Rwanda) Intwari Handisport Club |
| 9 | Jean Baptiste Gahamanyi | 20 October 1987 | | (Rwanda) HVP Gatagara |
| 10 | Fulgence Hagenimana | 5 May 1990 | | (Rwanda) HVP Gatagara |
| 11 | Eric Ngirinshuti | 1 September 1988 | | (Rwanda) THT Nyarugenge |
| 15 | Emile Vuningabo | 9 October 1986 | | (Rwanda) Intwari Handisport Club |

== See also ==
- Volleyball at the 2012 Summer Paralympics – Women's team rosters
