= Ownership of Arsenal F.C. & W.F.C. =

Legal aspect of the English football teams

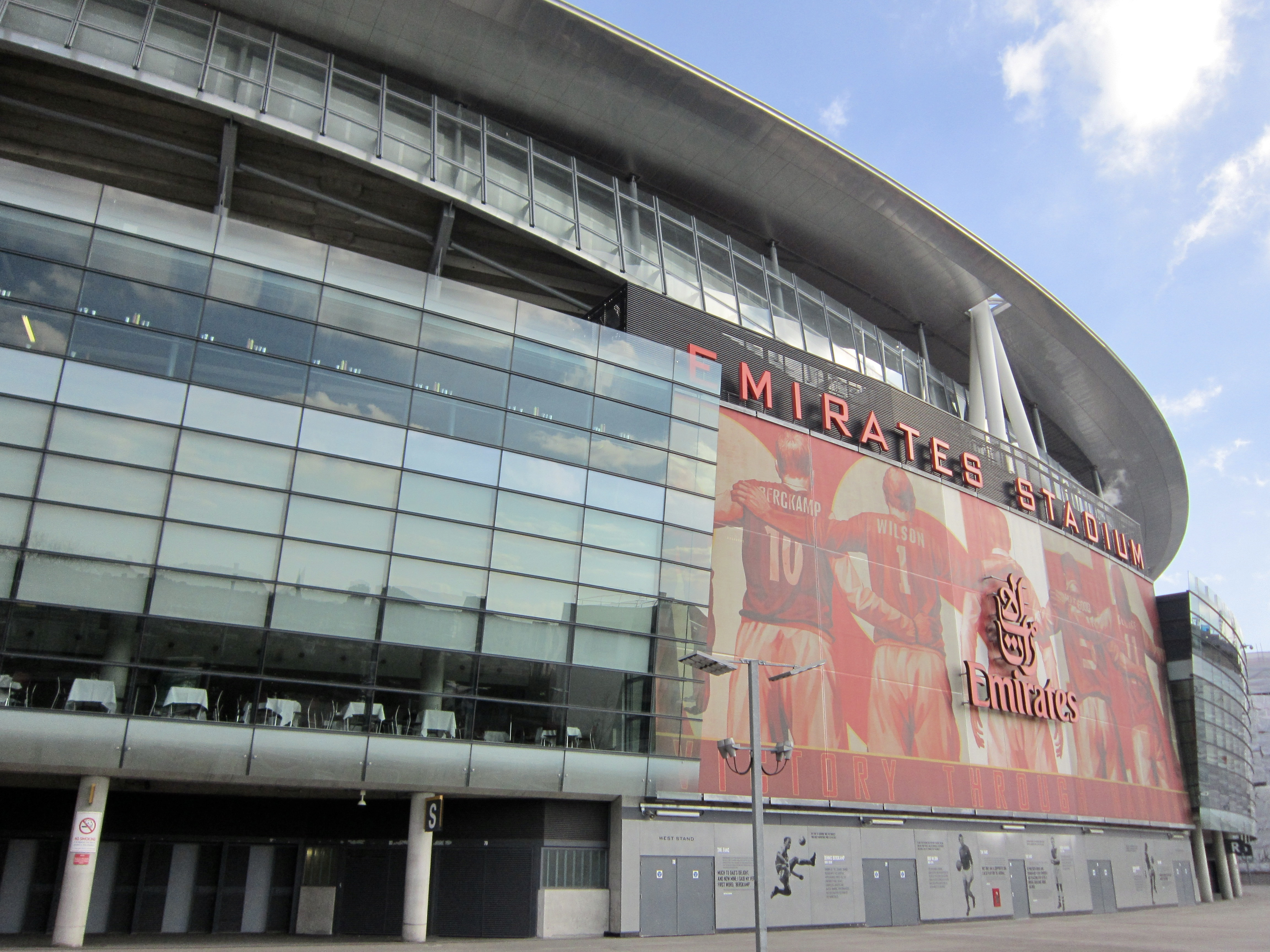
The Emirates Stadium in 2013.

The ownership of Arsenal F.C. and Arsenal W.F.C. is considerably different from that of other clubs in English football for men and women. It is owned by a parent company, Arsenal Holdings plc, which has relatively few shares which are infrequently traded. Historically, the club has been owned by descendants of the Bracewell-Smith and Hill-Wood families. The club attracted outside interest as two rival tycoons, Stan Kroenke and Alisher Usmanov, acquired significant share holdings in 2007. In August 2018, Kroenke's offer of £550 million for Usmanov's share was accepted, and Kroenke bought out the remainder of the shares to become the club's sole shareholder.

== Overview ==
Arsenal Holdings plc, operates as an unlisted public limited company, whose ownership is considerably different from that of other football clubs. Only 62,217 shares in Arsenal have been issued, and they are not traded on a public exchange such as the FTSE or AIM; instead, they are traded relatively infrequently on NEX Exchange (AFC), a specialist market. The 2011 takeover bid by Stan Kroenke put the club's market capitalisation value at £731m.

Arsenal Holdings plc wholly owns twelve subsidiary companies, covering the group's activities. These include Arsenal Football Club plc (the football club itself), Arsenal (Emirates Stadium) Limited (which develops and owns Arsenal's Emirates Stadium), Arsenal Stadium Management Company (which manages the stadium on matchdays), and Arsenal Overseas Ltd (which manages retail operations). Other subsidiaries deal with property development on the site of Arsenal's former stadium at Highbury and the associated property holding and financing.

== Financial performance ==
The club made an operating profit (excluding player transfers) of £72m in the year ending 31 May 2010, from a turnover of £379.9m. In April 2009, business magazine Forbes ranked Arsenal as third most valuable football team in the world, after Manchester United and Real Madrid, valuing the club at $1.2bn (£605m), excluding debt. Accountants Deloitte rated Arsenal fifth in the 2011 Deloitte Football Money League, a ranking of the world's football clubs in terms of revenue, with the club earning £274.1m in the 2009–10 season.

== History ==
As an amateur club, Royal Arsenal FC, Arsenal started out as a mutually owned club but after turning professional, converted to a limited liability company in 1893. The company struggled in the club's early years, with its location in industrial Woolwich resulting in low attendances. The club was liquidated and reformed in 1910, and taken over by the owner of Fulham FC, Henry Norris. Norris owned the club for the next nineteen years, moving it to Arsenal Stadium in Highbury in 1913. Norris however was forced to resign as chairman and left Arsenal in 1929 following an expenses scandal.

By the time of World War II the majority of Arsenal shares were held by Samuel Hill-Wood and Sir Bracewell Smith, the MP for Holborn and a future Lord Mayor of London. In those days the shares were not considered to be valuable and had never paid a dividend, and were seen largely as a charitable exercise to provide recreational entertainment for the working people of North London.

After his death, the shareholding of Sir Bracewell Smith was divided between his son and daughter and ended up in the hands of his grandchildren, Sir Charles Bracewell-Smith, Clive Carr (Life-President), Richard Carr and Sarah Carr, now Lady Phipps-Bagge. Samuel Hill-Wood's shares passed first to his son Denis and then his grandson and former Arsenal chairman Peter Hill-Wood; he sold much of his family's shareholdings in the 1980s to David Dein, who sold some of them on to Danny Fiszman (a London diamond dealer). In the early 2000s the club sold a 9.9% stake to Granada Holdings Ltd, a subsidiary of ITV plc, and a significant stake was also bought by hedge fund Lansdowne Partners.

== Current shareholders ==
As of 26 September 2018, Stan Kroenke, is the sole owner of Kroenke Sports Enterprises (KSE).

Kroenke's holdings in the club began with an initial 9.9% bought from ITV plc in April 2007; initially treated with hostility, he is now regarded as an ally of the Arsenal board and was appointed a non-executive director of the club in September 2008. Kroenke brought his stake in the club up to 20.5% following a purchase of shares from fellow director Danny Fiszman. On 1 May 2009, Arsenal announced that Kroenke had bought a further 4,839 shares from the Carr family, including Richard Carr, also a director, which made him the largest shareholder of the company with 28.3%. In November of the same year, this increased to the maximum 29.9% limit.

A rival bid for the club came from Red & White Holdings, which was co-owned by Russian billionaire Alisher Usmanov and London-based financier Farhad Moshiri. Red & White bought the stake held by former Arsenal vice-chairman David Dein, as well as stakes owned by Lansdowne and many other minor shareholders, and as by September 2011 owned 18,204 shares (29.25%) of the club, the largest single stake owned by a non-board member. This led to press speculation of a bidding war between Kroenke and Usmanov. However, Kroenke agreed not to purchase more than 29.9% of the club until at least September 2009, while the rest of the board agreed not to consider a sale of their shares to "non-permitted persons" until at least April 2009, and had first option on each other's shares until October 2012.

In April 2011, Kroenke extended his ownership of the club by purchasing the shareholdings of Nina Bracewell-Smith (15.9%), Danny Fiszman (16.11%) and other directors of the Arsenal board, taking his shareholding to 66.64%. Under the Takeover Code, Kroenke, as majority shareholder, was obliged to make an offer for the remaining shares in the club, which would include those owned by Red & White Holdings as well as any stakes held by the remaining minority shareholders of the club; these include those owned by former players as well as three shares owned by the Arsenal Supporters' Trust. Kroenke moved forward with this in August 2018 by purchasing Usmanov's stake.

In March 2023, Stan and Josh Kroenke were appointed co-chairmen in a board restructuring, with Director Tim Lewis becoming executive vice chairman.
