= Disaster (Dave song) =

Single by Dave featuring J Hus

from the album Psychodrama
- Released: 2019
- Length: 4:00
- Label: Dave; Neighbourhood
- Songwriters: David Omoregie; Momodou Jallow; Ikeoluwa Oladigbolu; Ayodele Oyadare
- Producers: iO; TSB

Dave singles chronology
"Location" (2019)	"Disaster" (2019)

J Hus singles chronology
"Dark Vader" (2018)	"Disaster" (2019)	"Daily Duppy" (2019)

"Disaster" is a song recorded by British rapper Dave featuring British rapper J Hus, released as the fourth single from Dave's debut studio album Psychodrama. The song was written by Dave, J Hus, Ikeoluwa Oladigbolu (aka TSB), Ayodele Oyadare (aka iO) and produced by iO, TSB, Fraser T. Smith, and Dave.

Commercially, the song reached the top 10 in the United Kingdom and top 30 in Ireland. In January 2022, it was certified as Platinum by the British Phonographic Industry for exceeding chart sales of 600,000. As of July 2025, the single has moved 847,028 units in the United Kingdom, respectively.

== Charts ==
Chart performance for "Disaster"
Chart (2019)	Peak position
Ireland (IRMA)	23
UK Singles (OCC)	8
UK Hip Hop/R&B (OCC)	2

== Certifications ==
Certifications for "Disaster"
Region	Certification	Certified units/sales
United Kingdom (BPI)	Platinum	600,000^{‡}
^{‡} Sales+streaming figures based on certification alone.
