= The Real Football Fan Show =

- Genre: Talk show
- Presented by: Robbie Lyle
- Country of origin: United Kingdom
- Original language: English
- No. of series: 3
- No. of episodes: 17

Production
- Running time: 24–29 minutes

Original release
- Network: Channel 4
- Release: 20 April 2018 – 16 March 2019

The Real Football Fan Show is a British football television talk show that first aired on Channel 4 in 2018. It is presented by Robbie Lyle, the founder of AFTV. The show features association football fans discussing various topics regarding the Premier League, the highest level of the English football league system.

== Transmissions ==
Series	Episodes	Originally released	
Series	Episodes	First released	Last released
1	4	20 April 2018	11 May 2018
2	5	15 September 2018	13 October 2018
3	8	26 January 2019	16 March 2019
