= Claude Callegari =

English football supporter (1962–2021)

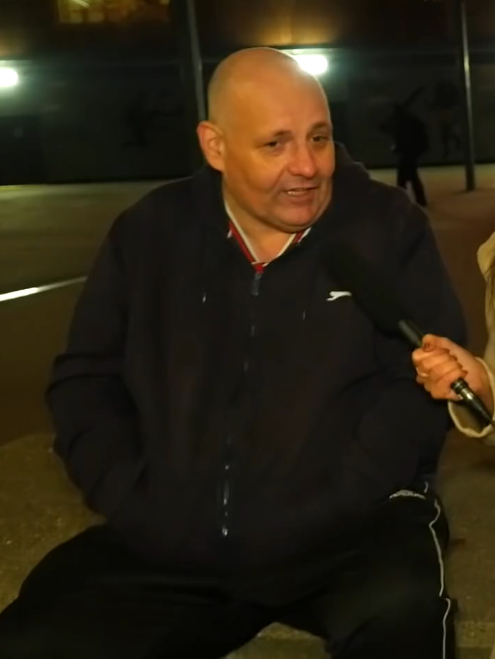
- Callegari in 2019
- Born: Claudio Luciano Ricardo Callegari; 19 October 1962; Islington, London, England
- Died: 29 March 2021 (aged 58)
- Occupation: Taxi driver
- Years active: 2012–2020 (on AFTV)
- Known for: YouTube videos on AFTV

Claudio Luciano Ricardo Callegari (19 October 1962 – 29 March 2021) was an English Arsenal supporter and a contributor to the football YouTube channel AFTV. He made his first appearance in 2012 before becoming a regular until 2020. He died on 29 March 2021.

== AFTV ==
Callegari was a contributor to AFTV (originally called ArsenalFanTV), a football fan YouTube channel made by Arsenal supporters. He made his first appearance on the channel in 2012. A critic of the Arsenal manager Arsène Wenger, he was known for the phrase "it's time to go" (referring to Wenger and later Unai Emery) that he used in his interview videos. He then became a regular on the channel, offering his opinions. Robbie Lyle, the creator of AFTV, spoke highly of Callegari as someone who "cares deeply about the club", also stating that "he's had some issues, but [that he's] a real character". He was regarded as a cult hero in English football by football fans for speeches he gave in support of Arsenal.

In 2016, he went missing from his home in Essex. However, a few days later he contacted his wife, resulting in Essex Police no longer considering him a missing person. Callegari later explained that mental health issues led to his disappearance.

In July 2020, Callegari was indefinitely removed from AFTV after an appearance on a North London derby "watch-along" stream, where he appeared to refer to Tottenham Hotspur player Son Heung-min as "DVD", a racial slur against East Asians. Callegari responded by claiming he had actually said "another DVD is coming out", referring to a long-running joke that Tottenham make many commemorative DVDs for every big victory, but Lyle removed him from AFTV and apologised for AFTV not acting upon it. Callegari agreed to attend an education programme as a result. Even though he no longer appeared on the channel, AFTV continued to privately support Callegari.

== Personal life and death ==
Outside of AFTV, Callegari worked as a London taxi driver and had a daughter. He died suddenly on 29 March 2021, aged 58. Former Arsenal player Ian Wright paid tribute to him, as did Arsenal. His family later stated that he had died of natural causes. He was cremated in May 2021, and his ashes were interred in Italy, alongside his mother, who died in 2009.

== See also ==
- AFTV
- Maria Petri
- List of solved missing person cases (2010s)
