= Location (Dave song) =

Single by Dave featuring Burna Boy

from the album Psychodrama
- Released: 8 March 2019
- Genre: Afrobeats; British hip hop
- Length: 4:01
- Label: Neighbourhood
- Songwriters: David Omoregie; Damini Ogulu; Jonathan Mensah
- Producers: Fraser T. Smith; Jae5

Dave singles chronology
"Streatham" (2019)	"Location" (2019)	"Disaster" (2019)

Burna Boy singles chronology
"Dangote" (2019)	"Location" (2019)	"Anybody" (2019)

"Location" is a song recorded by British rapper Dave featuring Nigerian singer Burna Boy, released as the third single from Dave's debut studio album Psychodrama. The song was written by Dave, Burna Boy and Jonathan Mensah, and produced by Fraser T. Smith, Jae5 and Dave. The song has a sample from Final Fantasy XIII (Sarah's Theme)

Commercially, the song reached the top 10 in the United Kingdom and top 20 in Ireland. It has been certified 5× platinum by the British Phonographic Industry for exceeding chart sales of 3,000,000.

== Music video ==
The music video for "Location" was released via YouTube on 15 July 2019. Directed by Kaylum and Dave, it was shot on location in Ibiza, and features behind the scenes shots of Stormzy's #MERKY Festival, held at Ibiza Rocks, which Dave co-headlined alongside Stormzy and Fredo.

Burna Boy appears in the video, alongside a number of cameo appearances from other artists and celebrities, including Stormzy, Fredo, Lethal Bizzle, Jorja Smith, Avelino, J Hus, Aitch, Unknown T, comedian Michael Dapaah and English footballers, Raheem Sterling and Jadon Sancho.

== Critical reception ==
Writing for Complex, Natty Kasambla referred to the track as "an understated bop".

== Charts ==
=== Weekly charts ===
2019 weekly chart performance for "Location"
Chart (2019)	Peak position
Ireland (IRMA)	20
UK Hip Hop/R&B (Official Charts)	2
UK Singles (Official Charts)	6

2022 weekly chart performance for "Location"
Chart (2022)	Peak position
Sweden Heatseeker (Sverigetopplistan)	12

2026 weekly chart performance for "Location"
Chart (2026)	Peak position
Nigeria Bubbling Under Hot 100 (TurnTable)	9

=== Year-end charts ===
2019 year-end chart performance for "Location"
Chart (2019)	Position
UK Singles (OCC)	13

2020 year-end chart performance for "Location"
Chart (2020)	Position
UK Singles (OCC)	68

2022 year-end chart performance for "Location"
Chart (2022)	Position
UK Singles (OCC)	85

== Certifications ==
Certifications for "Location"
Region	Certification	Certified units/sales
Canada (Music Canada)	Platinum	80,000^{‡}
Denmark (IFPI Danmark)	Platinum	90,000^{‡}
France (SNEP)	Diamond	333,333^{‡}
Germany (BVMI)	Gold	300,000^{‡}
Netherlands (NVPI)	Platinum	93,000^{‡}
New Zealand (RMNZ)	3× Platinum	90,000^{‡}
Nigeria (TCSN)	Platinum	100,000^{‡}
Norway (IFPI Norway)	Platinum	60,000^{‡}
Portugal (AFP)	Gold	5,000^{‡}
South Africa (RISA)	2× Platinum	80,000^{‡}
Switzerland (IFPI Switzerland)	2× Platinum	40,000^{‡}
United Kingdom (BPI)	5× Platinum	3,000,000^{‡}
United States (RIAA)	Gold	500,000^{‡}
Streaming
Sweden (GLF)	Platinum	12,000,000^{†}
^{‡} Sales+streaming figures based on certification alone.^{†} Streaming-only figures based on certification alone.
