= Black (Dave song) =

Single by Dave

from the album Psychodrama
- Released: 21 February 2019
- Length: 3:48
- Label: Neighbourhood
- Songwriters: David Omoregie; Fraser T. Smith
- Producer: Fraser T. Smith

Dave singles chronology
"Funky Friday" (2018)	"Black" (2019)	"Streatham" (2019)

Music video
- "Black" on YouTube

"Black" is a song by British rapper Dave, released on 21 February 2019 by Neighbourhood Recordings as the lead single from Dave's debut studio album, Psychodrama. The song was produced by Dave's mentor, Fraser T. Smith.

After winning the Album of the Year at the Brit Awards 2020, Dave performed the song live at the event, to major controversy after labelling, Boris Johnson, the then-Prime Minister of the United Kingdom as a "racist".

== Controversy ==
Upon the release of "Black", many listeners called Dave "racist" against white people after BBC Radio 1 played the song. In response, BBC Radio 1 DJs, Greg James and Annie Mac came to its defence, with the latter posting online that those complaining about the song are scared of the word "black". Following Dave's live performance at the 2020 BRIT Awards, over 300 complaints were made to Ofcom due to the added third verse of the song, however, the complaints were rejected. Furthermore, Priti Patel, the then-Home Secretary, came to the then-Prime Minister Borris Johnson's defence on BBC Breakfast, stating that "I know Boris Johnson very well, no way is he a racist, so I think that is a completely wrong comment [...] he is absolutely not a racist, and I’m afraid that is very much a generalisation that has been made by rapper Dave, and I just disagree with it,".

== Composition and content ==
"Black" is a British, political hip-hop track. In the song, Dave covers many of the problems and factors black people have to deal with on a day-to-day basis. He covers topics of institutional racism within the Metropolitan Police, slavery, and how the coasts in Africa are labelled, in particular, the Slave Coast of West Africa. In the BRITs live version, Dave labelled Boris Johnson, the then-Prime Minister of the United Kingdom as a "racist", he spoke about the Windrush scandal, the difference in how the news would treat Catherine, Princess of Wales and Meghan, Duchess of Sussex based on their race, the lack of rehabilitation for the victims of the Grenfell Tower fire, and the death of Jack Merritt.

== Critical reception ==
Writing for Complex, Natty Kasambala wrote that on the song, "Dave takes it upon himself to verbalise the breadth and intricacies of blackness in all its beauty and all its pain", continuing that, he's "detailing the effects of colonialism and slavery and the issues within black communities, as well as the pride of our heritage and the royalty of our ancestors". Evening Standard's Andre Paine wrote that the song "is a disquieting exploration of his identity". Alexis Petridis for The Guardian wrote that the song is "a complex, intelligent examination of racial identity that puzzles at the blanket use of the word 'black' to describe a multitude of different ethnicities". Petridis continued that it "rails against institutionalised racism and cultural appropriation but doesn’t shy away from pointing out failings within the rapper’s own community". The Independent's Roisin O'Connor and Elisa Bray wrote that the song "considers what that word means to different people around the world, as well as to Dave". Carl Anak for NME described the song as a "standout" track on Psychodrama, noting that "every piano key serves to emphasise the defiant and dexterous wordplay". Dan Hancox for The Observer describes the song as "a powerful reflection on the black British experience – spanning African diasporic pride and the weight of post-colonial pain and racism".

== Accolades ==
Awards and nominations for "Black"
Organization	Year	Category	Result	Ref.
UK Music Video Awards	2019	Best Urban Video – UK	Nominated	

== Music video ==
The official Nathan James Tettey, Edem Wornoo, and Dave-directed music video was released alongside the song. The video was filmed in Manchester and Lagos, which critics have described as a "powerful exploration of black identity". The video features cameos of several prominent black-British figures in the 21st century, such as fashion designer Ozwald Boateng, footballer Raheem Sterling, sprinter Dina Asher-Smith, radio presenter and DJ Tiffany Calver, computer scientist Anne-Marie Imafidon, rapper Stormzy, and actor Damson Idris.

== Personnel ==
Credits and personnel adapted from Tidal.

Musicians

- David Omoregie – lead artist,, vocals, songwriter, composer
- Fraser T. Smith – production, songwriter, composer

Technical

- Manon Grandjean – mastering, mixing

== Charts ==
Chart performance for "Black"
Chart (2019)	Peak position
Ireland (IRMA)	80
UK Singles (OCC)	40
UK Hip Hop/R&B (OCC)	10

== Certifications ==
Region	Certification	Certified units/sales
United Kingdom (BPI)	Gold	400,000^{‡}
^{‡} Sales+streaming figures based on certification alone.
