= Maria Petri =

English football supporter (1939–2022)

- Born: 1 March 1939; London, England
- Died: 22 July 2022 (aged 83)
- Occupation: Schoolteacher
- Known for: Arsenal and Arsenal Women supporter

Maria Petri (1 March 1939 – 22 July 2022) was an English Arsenal supporter. She had been attending Arsenal and Arsenal Women matches constantly since 1950 until her death on 22 July 2022 and had been recognised within English football for her unique chants.

== Personal life ==
Petri was born on 1 March 1939 to Greek-Cypriot parents, Michael and Eleni, who had immigrated from Akanthou the previous year. She studied French and Spanish at what is now the University of Chichester and worked as a schoolteacher teaching languages in Islington, London. She was reportedly able to speak six languages. She never married.

== Football supporting ==
Petri started taking an interest in football after hearing about Arsenal on the radio whilst she was washing dishes when she was 11. She started attending Arsenal matches at Highbury in 1950 secretly, as her parents would not allow her to go to football matches.

She quickly gained a reputation for creating her own chants for the players, such as "Come on you Gunners!" Occasionally she would receive sexist comments from fellow fans about her chanting but she would always respond with a chant of "You'll never keep me quiet!"

When Arsenal Ladies were started in 1987, she would also regularly attend their games. During UEFA Women's Euro 2022, one of her chants for Arsenal's and England's Beth Mead went viral. In all, she had supported Arsenal for 72 years. In 2022 she said "I'm now an 82-year-old orphan. Because I don't have any nuclear family, I see Arsenal as my family."

When she died on 22 July 2022, Arsenal published a tribute to her. The Arsenal manager Mikel Arteta said, "She was an integral part of our support and our community. The way she transmitted Arsenal values and the feeling of this football club was something I have never seen before." Arsenal Women's players also paid tribute due to her regular attendance and vocal support at their games. Arsenal fans and former men's players such as Ian Wright also paid tribute to her. On 23 July, Arsenal wore black armbands during their Florida Cup match against Chelsea as a tribute to her. Arsenal Women subsequently retained her season ticket seats as a charitable reward for members of their community scheme in Petri's honour.

== See also ==
- Claude Callegari
