= Psychodrama (album) =

Studio album by Dave
- Released: 8 March 2019
- Recorded: 2018–2019
- Genre: British hip-hop
- Length: 51:12
- Label: Neighbourhood
- Producers: Dave; Fraser T. Smith; 169; 1Mind; Kyle Evans; Jae5; Nana Rogues; TSB; iO

Dave chronology
Game Over (2017)	Psychodrama (2019)	We're All Alone in This Together (2021)

Singles from Psychodrama
- 1. "Black" Released: 21 February 2019; 2. "Streatham" Released: 7 March 2019; 3. "Location" Released: 15 July 2019; 4. "Disaster" Released: 2019

Psychodrama (stylised in uppercase letters) is the debut studio album by British rapper Dave, released on 8 March 2019. It follows his first two EPs, Six Paths (2016) and Game Over (2017). The album features guest appearances from J Hus, Burna Boy and Ruelle. Psychodrama was executive produced by both Dave and Fraser T. Smith. The album features Dave's piano playing, while Smith assisted with Baroque influences, including strings, brass, harps, as well as more contemporary music through the use of drums and the synthesizer.

A concept album, Psychodrama follows the narrative of a therapy session, primarily detailing the impact of Dave's elder brothers' prison convictions, along with his struggles with mental health, strained relationships, and the tough social conditions that confront poor black youths. The album was supported by four singles: "Black", "Streatham", "Location" and "Disaster", with the latter three all reaching the top 10 on the UK Singles Chart.

Psychodrama debuted at number one on the UK Albums Chart and received widespread acclaim from critics, being hailed by some as one of the best albums of the year. It became the most-streamed first-week British rap album in the UK with a total of 23.6 million streams. The album was certified double platinum by the British Phonographic Industry (BPI) for sales of at least 600,000 copies in the UK. It won the 2019 Mercury Prize and Album of the Year at the 2020 Brit Awards.

== Background ==
In a 2017 interview with NME, Dave revealed he was working on his debut album slated for a 2018 release, stating: "I know exactly how I'm going to make it and what I need it to be, I just need to find the time."

Speaking on his relationship with Dave, co-executive producer Fraser T. Smith said, "I've known Dave since he was 17. I was in the middle of working on Stormzy's Gang Signs and Prayer album and my friends Jack Foster and Benny Scarrs who manage Dave introduced us. We immediately hit it off and put in a studio session. We wrote "Picture Me" during that session and the relationship developed into us working together on Dave's first and second EPs 6 Paths, and Game Over."

The album was officially announced on 21 February 2019 following the release of his single "Black'" to YouTube. An accompanying tour was announced days later, and the tracklist was revealed on 3 March, showing features from Burna Boy, Ruelle, and the then-incarcerated J Hus. Coinciding with the album's release, Dave released another single, "Streatham" on 7 March, via a music video. He also performed an extended version of "Black" at the 2020 BRIT Awards.

== Production ==
Regarding the recording process for Psychodrama, Smith said, "I never want to repeat myself creatively, and was wary about replicating the unique processes and dynamics which had made my working relationships with Kano and Stormzy so special, but Dave is a one off – namely because our music comes from jamming in the studio. His piano playing and musicality are phenomenal, as well as the diverse influences we both draw from, so it's a great blend. [...] Dave typically creates ideas on the piano, and I'll sometimes sit down the other end of the keyboard, adding bass notes or chords, or will grab a guitar or bass or be playing on the Akai MPC4000 or Ableton." Expanding on the Baroque influences on the album, Smith said, "We knew from the beginning that we'd be drawing from a very wide musical palette of strings, brass, harps, and hard-hitting drums and synths. I love to blend acoustic instrumentation with electronic elements. Manon Grandjean, my long-standing engineer, beautifully captured Dave’s piano, guitars, drums and vocals at my studio in Fulham." Regarding the album's vocals, a Sony C800 microphone was used and tracked through a UTA mic pre, summit TLA 100 compressor and then the UTA Unfairchild compressor.

== Themes ==
Psychodrama has been referred to as a "concept album", and has a three-act structure; act one is defined as "environment", act two "relationships", and act three "social compass". Smith said that Dave "spent a long time coming up with the title and concept for the album [...] Psychodrama was always going to be a very ambitious project. [...] The overarching theme was to document Dave's life up to this point in terms of his upbringing, his life in South London as a young black male, the struggles, the joys, the uncertainty, the ambitions, hopes and fears. The album addresses a number of issues, particularly focusing on Dave's struggles with mental health, namely depression. The first track begins with Dave talking to a therapist, a constant throughout the album.

Other themes include Dave's strained relationships, poor upbringing, his father's absence and the impact it had on him, and issues such as domestic abuse and racial inequality. Dave has said much of the inspiration for the album came from his older brother, Christopher, who is serving life in prison. The themes of psychotherapy came from the same type of therapy his brother receives in prison.

The 11-minute song "Lesley" details the story of a woman going through an abusive relationship; Dave describes the song as "a story about someone suffering a complete loss of character by being with someone that isn't good for them."

== Critical reception ==
Professional ratings
Aggregate scores
Source	Rating
AnyDecentMusic?	8.7/10
Metacritic	90/100
Review scores
Source	Rating
AllMusic	4.5/5 stars
Complex	5/5 stars
Evening Standard	4/5 stars
The Guardian	5/5 stars
The Independent	5/5 stars
NME	5/5 stars
The Observer	4/5 stars
Pitchfork	8.0/10
Q	4/5 stars
The Times	4/5 stars

Psychodrama received universal acclaim from critics. At Metacritic, which assigns a normalised rating out of 100 to reviews from mainstream publications, the album received an average score of 90, based on 10 reviews and it is currently one of the top 100 highest-rated albums on the website. For Complex, Natty Kasambala wrote that "For a record tackling such heavy subject matter, it's still shockingly listenable and by constantly moving through different paces it holds your interest", praising the album's lyrics, production and Dave's flow. Writing on Dave's subject matter versatility Dan-O from Freemusicempire commented "It is exciting to find someone with this much to say on this many subjects while exercising this much versatility but more importantly... this dude has a plan."

Alexis Petridis of The Guardian acclaimed Psychodrama with a perfect score, calling it "the boldest and best British rap album in a generation." Petridis described Dave's lyrics as "smart, thoughtful, unflinching and self-aware", adding that it "says something about how incisive Dave is as a writer that the album lasts for the best part of an hour, and not a minute of its running time seems wasted or padded out." The Independent labelled Psychodrama as "one of the most thoughtful, moving and necessary albums of 2019 so far", complimenting the concept and lyrical content: "Tracks are at once astute and deeply personal in how they capture vignettes of everyday life and spin them into important lessons."

Dan-O of Freemusicempire wrote "He opens the album in a therapist[']s office getting personal right off the bat and giving you a setting that makes sense so you don't feel awkward. He's meticulous and diligent…maybe that's not the right word. He's so in love with finding the depth in art, the kind of depth that resonates, that working harder to achieve it doesn't bother him in the slightest."

Sam Higgins of The Line of Best Fit lauded Psychodrama as "a record that's suffocatingly intense", concluding: "Psychodrama isn't an album to stand up and rejoice to. It's a sit-down-and-consume, a listen-and-learn. In doing that, you appreciate the blood, sweat and tears that have gone into the prose. It’s an overwhelmingly powerful 51 minutes of music unlike anything released this year. We're truly in the presence of someone leading a remarkable generation of UK rap and I have no doubt we'll look back at Psychodrama as a seminal piece of art in this movement." Carl Anka of NME also awarded the album a perfect score, calling it a "masterpiece", "bold and thought-provoking", and "the kind of record that comes along only rarely."

Reviewing the album for AllMusic, David Crone stated that the album "has all the makings of a generational classic. Packing dense lyricism, poignant introspection, and resonant production into a neatly compiled concept, Dave's debut album is the product of a MC beyond his years, standing firmly among the Godfathers and Made in the Manors as one of the strongest British rap albums of the decade.

=== Year-end rankings ===
Year-end rankings for Psychodrama
Publication	Accolade	Rank	Ref.
The A.V. Club	Top 20 Albums of 2019	16	
GQ	Best Album of 2019	1	
The Guardian	Top 50 Albums of 2019	2	
The Independent	Top 50 Albums of 2019	10	
PopMatters	Top 70 Albums of 2019	5	
The Vinyl Factory	Top 50 Albums of 2019	1	

== Awards and nominations ==
Awards and nominations for Psychodrama
Organization	Year	Category	Result	Ref.
Q Awards	2019	Best Album	Nominated	
Mercury Prize	2019	Best Album	Won	
AIM Awards	2019	Best Independent Album	Won	
Brit Awards	2020	Album of the Year	Won	

== Commercial performance ==
Predicted to chart at number five midweek, Psychodrama debuted at number one on the UK Albums Chart, selling a combined 26,390 album-equivalent units. The album became the most-streamed first-week British rap album in the UK with a total of 23.6 million streams. It is also the first British rap album to chart at number one since Gang Signs & Prayer by Stormzy, released in 2017. Psychodrama also debuted at number 26 on the Dutch Album Top 100, number 6 on the Irish Albums Chart and number 19 on the Scottish Albums Chart.

Following the release of Psychodrama, Dave landed the three highest charting new entries on the UK Singles Chart for the week of March 15, with album tracks "Disaster", "Streatham" and "Location", debuting at numbers 8, 9 and 11, respectively. "Location" reached a peak of number 6 after being released as a single.

== Track listing ==
Psychodrama track listing
No.	Title	Writer(s)	Producer(s)	Length
1.	"Psycho"	David Omoregie; Kyle Evans; Maggie Eckford; Alexi von Guggenburg; Josh Bruce Williams	Evans	4:09
2.	"Streatham"	Omoregie; Nana Rogues	Rogues	3:26
3.	"Black"	Omoregie; Fraser T. Smith	Smith	3:48
4.	"Purple Heart"	Omoregie; Evans; Natalie Stewart; Marsha Ambrosius; Lonnie Lynn; Scott Storch	Evans	2:44
5.	"Location" (featuring Burna Boy)	Omoregie; Damini Ebunoluwa Ogulu; Jonathan Mensah	Jae5; Dave^{[a]}	4:01
6.	"Disaster" (featuring J Hus)	Omoregie; Momodou Jallow; Ikeoluwa Tobi Oladigbolu	TSB; IO	4:00
7.	"Screwface Capital"	Omoregie; Tyrell Paul; Smith; Selam Woldehaimanot	169; Smith; Dave	4:13
8.	"Environment"	Omoregie; Smith	Smith	3:23
9.	"Lesley" (featuring Ruelle)	Omoregie; Smith; James Napier; Eckford	Smith	11:08
10.	"Voices"	Omoregie; McCulloch Reid-Sutphin; Keith Askey; Jacob Reske; Smith	1Mind; Smith^{[a]}	3:18
11.	"Drama"	Omoregie; Smith; Eckford; von Guggenburg; Williams	Smith	7:04
Total length:				51:12

Notes

- ^{^[a]} signifies an additional producer
- "Purple Heart" contains a sample of the recording "Supastar", performed by Floetry.

== Personnel ==
Musicians

- David "Dave" Omoregie – primary artist (all tracks), executive production, production (all tracks), additional production (track 5), piano (track 3, 9), keyboards (track 7)
- Fraser T. Smith – executive production, production (track 1, 2), additional production (track 10), piano (track 3, 4, 8, 9, 11), keyboards (track 7, 11), additional keyboards (track 9–10), acoustic guitar (track 4), bass programming (track 3), drum programming (track 8, 11), bass guitar (track 3, 4, 8)
- Burna Boy – featured artist (track 5)
- J Hus – featured artist (track 6)
- Ruelle – featured artist (track 9)
- 169 – production (track 7), piano (track 7)
- 1Mind – production (track 10), music production (track 10)
- Jae5 – production (track 5)
- Kyle Evans – production (track 1, 4), piano (track 1)
- TSB – music production (track 6)
- Nana Rogues – production (track 2)
- Barry Clements – trombone (track 9)
- Beverley Jones – double bass (track 3)
- Bryony James – cello (track 3)
- Camilla Pay – harp (track 9)
- Chloe Vincent – flute (track 9)
- Corinne Bailey – French horn (track 9)
- Edward Tarrant – trombone (track 9)
- Ellie Stanford – violin (track 3, 9)
- Emma Owens – viola (track 3)
- Gillian Cameron – violin (track 9)
- Hayley Pomfrett – violin (track 9)
- Helen Hathorn – violin (track 9)
- James Douglas – cello (track 3, 9)
- Jenny Sacha – violin (track 3, 9)
- Meghan Cassidy – viola (track 3)
- Patrick Kiernan – violin (track 3, 9)
- Richard Pryce – double bass (track 9)
- Rosie Danvers – cello (track 3, 9)
- Ruth O'Reilly – French horn (track 9)
- Sally Jackson – violin (track 9)
- Wired Strings – strings (track 3, 9)
- Zahra Benyounes – violin (track 3, 9)
- Selam Woldehaimanot - co-writer/un-featured artist (track 7)

Technical

- 169 – drum programming (track 7)
- Dan Hayden – assistant recording engineer (track 9)
- Jae5 – vocal engineer (track 5)
- Manon Grandjean – engineering, mixing, mastering (all tracks)
- Michael Zuvela – vocal engineering (track 9)
- Nana Rogues – vocal engineering (track 2)
- Nick Taylor – engineer (track 3)
- Olly Thompson – assistant recording engineering (track 2)
- Paul Carr – assistant recording engineer (all tracks)
- Paul Pritchard – engineering (track 9)
- Phillip Davidson – vocal engineering (track 3)
- Rosie Danvers – string arranger (track 3, 9)
- Trevor Anderson – vocal engineer (track 7)

== Charts ==
=== Weekly charts ===
2019 weekly chart performance for Psychodrama
Chart (2019)	Peak position
Belgian Albums (Ultratop Flanders)	169
Dutch Albums (Album Top 100)	26
Irish Albums (IRMA)	6
Scottish Albums (Official Charts)	19
UK Albums (Official Charts)	1
UK R&B Albums (Official Charts)	1

2022 weekly chart performance for Psychodrama
Chart (2022)	Peak position
Danish Albums (Hitlisten)	31
Scottish Albums (Official Charts)	8

2025 weekly chart performance for Psychodrama
Chart (2025)	Peak position
Scottish Albums (Official Charts)	12
UK Albums (Official Charts)	17

=== Year-end charts ===
2019 year-end chart performance for Psychodrama
Chart (2019)	Position
Irish Albums (IRMA)	45
UK Albums (OCC)	22

2020 year-end chart performance for Psychodrama
Chart (2020)	Position
Irish Albums (IRMA)	46
UK Albums (OCC)	46

2021 year-end chart performance for Psychodrama
Chart (2021)	Position
UK Albums (OCC)	80

2022 year-end chart performance for Psychodrama
Chart (2022)	Position
UK Albums (OCC)	56

== Certifications ==
Certifications for Psychodrama
Region	Certification	Certified units/sales
Canada (Music Canada)	Gold	40,000^{‡}
Denmark (IFPI Danmark)	Platinum	20,000^{‡}
New Zealand (RMNZ)	Gold	7,500^{‡}
Sweden (GLF)	Platinum	30,000^{‡}
United Kingdom (BPI)	2× Platinum	600,000^{‡}
^{‡} Sales+streaming figures based on certification alone.
