= COPA90 =

Sports media company

COPA90 Limited
- Industry: Sports Media
- Genre: Sports, Entertainment
- Founded: 2012
- Headquarters: London, England, UK
- Key people: Tom Thirlwall (CEO)
- Number of employees: 50–100
- Website: www.copa90.com

COPA90 is a football media business headquartered in London, England and founded in 2012.

== COPA90 ==
Bigballs Media launched COPA90 as a YouTube Channel in 2012, providing football related content to digital audiences including documentaries about football culture and interviews with players from the game. In recent years it has evolved beyond YouTube and now distributes its content to over 8.5 million cross-platform followers.

In 2020 it was ranked number 57 on the Sunday Times 'Tech Track 100' and in 2019 named as one of Fast Companies 'Most Innovative Companies'

== Finances ==
Liberty Global bought a 14% stake in the company for £7 million in 2015.

Time Warner subsidiary Turner International bought an undisclosed stake in the company in 2017.
