= George Saunders (footballer, born 1989) =

English footballer

Personal information
- Date of birth: 10 June 1989 (age 37)
- Place of birth: London, England
- Position: Midfielder

Youth career
- Arsenal
- Villarreal
- Torre Levante
- 2006–2008: Espanyol
- 2008–2009: Damm

Senior career*
Years	Team	Apps	(Gls)
2009	Villarreal C	15	(1)
2009–2012	Levante B	47	(0)
2012	Eldense	14	(0)
2013	América de Cali	15	(0)
2013–2014	Fortaleza	32	(1)
2014	Unión Magdalena	13	(0)
2015	Patriotas	6	(0)
2015–2022	Envigado	131	(1)
2023	Atlético Huila	12	(0)
Total		274	(3)
- * Club domestic league appearances and goals as of 13:39, 14 November 2023 (UTC)

George Saunders (born 10 June 1989) is an English former professional footballer who played as midfielder.

== Club career ==
Born in London, Saunders joined the academy of Arsenal at the age of eight. He moved with his family to Spain, and was recruited by Villarreal, but was released by them, going on to join Torre Levante and then Espanyol. During this time he became the first British player to be called up to the Catalonia national football team. Ahead of the 2023 season, Saunders joined Atlético Huila on a free transfer after seven years with Envigado. In October 2023, Saunders announced on Instagram that he had retired from professional football.

== Personal life ==
In October 2022, Saunders received Colombian citizenship.
