= Lesley (Dave song) =

2019 song by Dave

Song by Dave featuring Ruelle

from the album Psychodrama
- Released: 8 March 2019
- Length: 11:08
- Label: Neighbourhood
- Songwriters: David Omoregie; Maggie Eckford; Fraser T. Smith; James Napier
- Producer: Fraser T. Smith

Audio video
- "Lesley" on YouTube

"Lesley" is a song by British rapper Dave, featuring American singer-songwriter Ruelle, released on 8 March 2019 by Neighbourhood Recordings as the ninth cut of Dave's debut studio album, Psychodrama. Over eleven minutes long, it was produced by Dave's mentor, Fraser T. Smith and marks Dave's longest released song.

== Composition and content ==
"Lesley" is a British hip hop storytelling track. It's 11:08 long and is the longest song Dave has released. On the track, Dave tells a story about Lesley, a woman he met at Norbury railway station, with whom he had a conversation about her life. Lesley describes to Dave how she feels trapped in an abusive relationship and is pregnant with the abuser, Jason's child. Further into the track, it's revealed that Lesley is struggling to leave her boyfriend before catching Jason cheating on her with her friend, Hannah. On "Drama", the final cut of Psychodrama, Dave reveals that he broke the fourth wall with "Lesley", suggesting that it may be based on one of his family members.

== Critical reception ==
Writing for Complex, Natty Kasambala describes the song as "the challenging 11-minute apex of the album", writing that "the warping of police sirens into melancholic wails add to the chilling atmosphere of the track in the verse breaks". Andre Paine for Evening Standard wrote that the song "plays out like a gritty urban thriller". The Guardian's Alexis Petridis describes the track as the album's "centerpiece", writing that it "depicts an abusive relationship and its shattering fallout in harrowing detail". Petridis continued that the subject matter of the song is "unremittingly grim", but it's also "genuinely gripping". Roisin O'Connor and Elisa Bray for The Independent described the song as "a devastating, nine-minute account of a woman Dave has conversations with on the train, from a different background". Writing for NME, Carl Anka described the song as "grand work" while noting that it "could have easily crossed over to crass or exploitative".

== Personnel ==
Credits and personnel adapted from Tidal.

Musicians

- David Omoregie – lead artist,, vocals, songwriter, composer
- Ruelle – featured artist, vocals, songwriter, composer
- Fraser T. Smith – production, songwriter, composer
- Jimmy Napier – songwriter, composer

Technical

- Manon Grandjean – mastering, mixing

== Charts ==
Chart performance for "Lesley"
Chart (2019)	Peak position
UK Audio Streaming (OCC)	54

== Certifications ==
Region	Certification	Certified units/sales
United Kingdom (BPI)	Silver	200,000^{‡}
^{‡} Sales+streaming figures based on certification alone.
