= White Yardie =

British actor, comedian and social media presenter

- Born: Harry Gregory; United Kingdom
- Citizenship: British, Jamaican
- Occupations: comedian; actor
- Years active: 2015–present

Harry Gregory, better known by his stage name White Yardie, is a British and Jamaican comedian, actor and social media personality. Born in the United Kingdom, he was raised in Jamaica.

== Biography ==
=== Life ===
In a Channel 4 interview Gregory stated that due to his mother's previous miscarriage, when she became pregnant with him and did not feel comfortable with the local hospital, she temporarily relocated from Jamaica to the United Kingdom to receive prenatal and postnatal care. When he was 3 months old, they went back to Jamaica.

He grew up in St. Elizabeth, Jamaica. His father, a sound system operator, moved from Jamaica to the UK back and forth all through Gregory's childhood, with Gregory sometimes living with friends. "There are people who feel like me nuh know or understand certain things because there is a stigma attached to the colour of my skin that I was a privileged child, when that is really inaccurate. Me nuh grow nuh different from any other Jamaican child," he told a Jamaican newspaper, The Gleaner, in 2019.

After graduating high school and several of his friends moving to relatives in Canada, the UK, and the US, he found himself moving to relatives in Peckham, southeast London, in 2002. There were two Jamaicans on his block in Peckham, Gregory and a black youth called Yardie, and Gregory quickly received the nickname White Yardie, being a caucasian/white person from Jamaica

=== Career ===
He began his comedy career through social media outlets, predominantly Instagram. He transitioned from social media expression via video to sharing satirical stories in front of a live audience. He was nominated for Best Comedian 2016 by the UK Entertainment Awards.

As of 2020 he has been a regular contributor to AFTV fan YouTube channel and website directed at supporters of Arsenal F.C., founded by former BBC reggae radio host Robbie Lyle.

He has performed at comedy events such as Come Kin Yuh Teeth, Ring in Jamaica 60 in Birmingham, TDS Presents Comedy Fest in Reading, White Yardie + Joe Clair Father's Day Special, Laugh Out Loud: Father's Day Comedy Show in Saint Croix, Wahala: White Yardie vs. Axel Blake in London, Deighton Carnival 2022, Jamaica Vs The World Comedy Warehouse and more.

== Controversy ==
In November 2021 White Yardie had to defend himself after his Jamaican heritage was called into question on Channel 4 debate programme Unapologetic, hosted by Zeze Millz and Yinka Bokinni. When Millz asked if he "classes himself as Jamaican", White Yardie stated: "I do class myself as part of the Jamaican culture but it's one of them ones where I have never given myself any titles of anything. People have given it to me. I would class [myself] as Jamaican because of my experience and also I spent the majority of my life in Jamaica, and also my whole life is lived as a Jamaican lifestyle." In the same TV debate, journalist Nicolas-Tyrell Scott asked Gregory when he "decided" to be Jamaican. TV watchdog Ofcom confirmed it received over 51 complaints over the line of questioning, while many viewers defended White Yardie on social media.

== Film and television ==
Year	Title	Role	Notes
2019	Blue Story	Karina's Dad	A musical crime drama film written, directed, and narrated by Rapman
2021	Unapologetic	Himself	Debate program on Channel 4
