= Osh (singer) =

English singer and rapper

- Born: O'Shea Angelo McDonald; 6 August 1995 (age 30); London, England
- Origin: Norbury, London, England
- Genres: Hip hop; freestyle rap; R&B
- Years active: 2017–present
- Label: Columbia Records
- Website: www.oshthisside.com

O'Shea Angelo McDonald (born 6 August 1995), also known as Osh, is an English singer and rapper. He grew up singing in his church choir, and learned to play the piano and the violin. As a teenager, he concentrated on sports, receiving a football scholarship and pursuing sports to degree level. But his love for music won out. In the summer of 2017, he released his debut single "Will You", followed by a series of Instagram freestyles.

Osh gained notoriety with his cover of Burna Boy's "Yé", which he released on Instagram and Twitter titled "My Yé Is Different". Osh's title phrase from the beginning of the video, 'My Yé is different to your Yé', became a viral meme. Many interpreted it to mean either superiority, or just 'my vibe is different from yours'. Specifics aside, Osh's viral remix helped touch off much discussion of how such releases can influence the originals' popularity as they gain their own, and related questions around influence and originality.

The track led to a live appearance singing on the London Eye for BBC Radio 1Xtra.

Osh signed with Columbia Records in November 2018 and the single was released on 16 November.
