= Robert Richardson (sitting volleyball) =

British sitting volleyball player (born 1982)

Personal information
- Nationality: British
- Born: 17 May 1982 (age 44)

Volleyball information
- Position: setter
- Number: 7

Career
Years	Teams
2012	Surrey Gators

National team
2012	(United Kingdom) Great Britain sitting volleyball team

Robert Richardson (born 17 May 1982) is a British male Paralympic sitting volleyball player, playing as a setter.

He has been the captain of the Great Britain men's national sitting volleyball team since 2009.

He competed at the 2012 Summer Paralympics finishing 8th.

He is currently the record cap holder for the Great Britain team, competing over 100 times for Great Britain in Sitting Volleyball.

Nationally, Robert has won the National Championship 7 times.

== See also ==
- Great Britain at the 2012 Summer Paralympics
