= Arsenal Supporters' Trust =

- Formation: 2003; 23 years ago
- Type: Supporters' trust
- Legal status: Community Benefit Society
- Purpose: Football fans' advocacy
- Members: Over 750
- Main organ: Tim Payton
- Affiliations: Supporters Direct
- Website: arsenaltrust.org

The Arsenal Supporters' Trust is the official supporters' trust of Arsenal Football Club, as recognised by Supporters Direct. The group, like other supporters' trusts, seeks to strengthen the influence of supporters over the destiny of their clubs through democratic supporter ownership.

== History and constitution ==
The group was founded in 2003 as The Arsenal Supporters' Trust and is registered as an Industrial and Provident Society, which means the Trust is owned equally by all of its members. Each member has one vote in the Trust's elections. Though it is recognised by Supporters Direct as the official Supporters Trust for Arsenal FC, and holds regular dialogue with the club, the Arsenal Supporters' Trust is wholly independent and is not owned or financially dependent on the club or its owners.

With a membership of approximately 1,000, it is one of the smaller supporters' trusts in the United Kingdom, but has a close working relationship with the club. AST's members include small shareholders as well as supporters and the Trust itself owns three of the 62,217 shares in the club, including the so-called 'orphan share', donated by the club in 2007.

== 2007–09 takeover role ==
The Trust has played a role in the ongoing takeover bids for the club by rivals Stan Kroenke and Alisher Usmanov. Regarding Usmanov's bid as hostile, in November 2007 the Trust joined the Arsenal board's lockdown agreement to prevent a full takeover. In May 2008 the Arsenal Supporters' Trust came down in favour of Stan Kroenke as a more likely long term, supportive, investor in Arsenal FC and published a summary of their point of view, following a visit to some of the sports franchise and TV interests of Kroenke in the United States. The Trust went on to work as bridgebuilder between Kroenke and the Arsenal board.

== 2011 takeover role ==
The Trust did not support their shareholder members selling shares to Stan Kroenke in May 2011 when his company bought the shares of two major shareholders Danny Fizsman and Lady Nina Bracewell. The Offer of £11,750 per share came about due to the death of Danny Fiszman with his Estate selling his shares, obliging Kroenke to launch a full take-over bid as he had exceeded the 30 percent threshold. Kroenke through Kroenke Sports Enterprises (KSE) had acceptances from shareholders at the end of the Offer on Friday 10 June 2011 amounting to 66.64% of the issued share capital of Arsenal Holdings PLC.

== 2014 fan-ownership initiative ==
The Trust launched 'the fanshare scheme' in August 2010 with the vocal backing of the club's chief executive, Ivan Gazidis, as a vehicle for fans to buy part shares in Arsenal. More than 1,800 members invested almost £2m in the scheme, which gave fans the rights that came with share ownership, including the ability to attend the Arsenal annual meeting, pose questions on club finances and vote on policy. In spite of the Arsenal Supporters Trust's disapproval of Stan Kroenke, they disposed of the Fanshare shares on the scheme's collapse by selling to Kroenke.
