= MOBO Awards 2022 =

2022 edition of award ceremony

- Date: 30 November 2022
- Location: Wembley Arena, London
- Hosted by: Chunkz and Yung Filly

Highlights
- Most awards: Central Cee and Burna Boy (2)
- Most nominations: Knucks (5)
- Website: mobo.com

Television/radio coverage
- Network: YouTube (live coverage); BBC One (highlights)

The 25th MOBO Awards were held on 30 November 2022 at the Wembley Arena in London, to recognize achievements in "music of black origin" during 2022. The ceremony was hosted by internet personalities Chunkz and Yung Filly, and was live-streamed through YouTube.

The nominees were announced on 11 November 2022, introducing two new categories, Best Alternative Music Act and Best Electronic/Dance Act. For the first time, the Album of the Year award was given to two artists, Little Simz and Knucks. British music entrepreneur Jamal Edwards received the Paving the Way Award as a posthumous honour to recognize his contributions in helping various artists to launch their careers.

== Performers ==
The performers were announced on 17 November 2022.

List of performers at the MOBO Awards 2022
Artist(s)	Song(s)
Tion Wayne	"IFTK" "Body" "Wow"
FLO	"Immature" "Cardboard Box"
Kojey Radical	"Pusher Man: BWI"
Beenie Man	"Who Am I (Sim Simma)" "Dude" "Girls Dem Sugar"
Cat Burns	"Go"
Craig David	"Fill Me In" "Rewind" "7 Days"
Eliza Rose Sweet Female Attitude Sonique	"B.O.T.A. (Baddest of Them All)" "Flowers" "It Feels So Good"
Emeli Sandé	Tribute to Jamal Edwards "Heaven"
Black Sherif Fireboy DML	"Kwaku the Traveller" "Bandana" "Peru"
Nile Rodgers Chic	"Le Freak" "Get Lucky" "Good Times"

== Winners and nominees ==
The nominees were announced on 11 November 2022. The winners are listed first and in bold.

**Album of the Year**: **Alpha Place – Knucks**; **Sometimes I Might Be Introvert – Little Simz**; Close to Home – Aitch; Reason to Smile – Kojey Radical; Chasing Euphoria – M Huncho; Tales of a Miracle – Miraa May	**Song of the Year**: **"Own Brand (Baddie)" – Dreya Mac, Felixthe1st & Finch Fetti**; "Baby" – Aitch featuring Ashanti; "Doja" – Central Cee; "Starlight" – Dave; "Pump 101" – Digga D & Stillbrickin; "Gangsteritus" – Potter Payper featuring Tiggs Da Author
**Best Male Act**: **Central Cee**; Dave; D-Block Europe; Digga D; Knucks; Tion Wayne	**Best Female Act**: **Pinkpantheress**; Little Simz; Mahalia; Miraa May; Ms Banks; Tiana Major9
**Best Newcomer**: **Bru-C**; AMARIA BB; Cat Burns; Clavish; Cristale; FLO; Jbee; Nemzzz; Nia Archives; Switchotr	**Video of the Year**: **"Doja" – Central Cee (Directed by Cole Bennett)**; "Can't Be Us" – Headie One, Abra Cadabra & Bandokay (Directed by Headie One & Don Prod); "Alpha House/Hide & Seek" – Knucks (Directed by Emile Ebrahim Kelly); "Payback" – Kojey Radical featuring Knucks (Directed by Charlie Sarsfield & Ejiro Dafé); "Point and Kill" – Little Simz featuring Obongjayar (Directed by Ebeneza Blanche); "Whatever Simon Says" – Mahalia (Directed by Mahalia)
**Best R&B/Soul Act**: **Mahalia**; Ella Mai; Miraa May; Nao; Shakka; Tiana Major9	**Best Grime Act**: **D Double E**; Blay Vision; Frisco; Kamakaze; Manga Saint Hilare; Novelist
**Best Hip Hop Act**: **D-Block Europe**; Knucks; Kojey Radical; Little Simz; Potter Payper; Youngs Teflon	**Best Drill Act**: **K-Trap**; Central Cee; Digga D; Headie One; Ivorian Doll; Kwengface; M24; Russ Millions; Unknown T; V9
**Best Alternative Music Act**: **Bob Vylan**; Big Joanie; Kid Bookie; Loathe; Nova Twins; Skunk Anansie	**Best Electronic/Dance Act**: **Nia Archives**; Anz; Eliza Rose; FKA Twigs; Jax Jones; Sherelle
**Best International Act**: **Burna Boy**; Beyoncé; Chris Brown; Drake; Jack Harlow; Jazmine Sullivan; Kendrick Lamar; Skillibeng; Summer Walker; Tems	**Best African Music Act**: **Burna Boy (Nigeria)**; Adekunle Gold (Nigeria); Asake (Nigeria); Fireboy DML (Nigeria); Kabza de Small (South Africa); Omah Lay (Nigeria); Oxlade (Nigeria); Pheelz (Nigeria); Rema (Nigeria); Tems (Nigeria)
**Best Gospel Act**: **Still Shadey**; Asha Elia; Calledout Music; Rachel Kerr; Reblah; Sarah Téibo	**Best Jazz Act**: **Ezra Collective**; Blue Lab Beats; Doomcannon; Ego Ella May; Jas Kayser; KOKOROKO
**Best Caribbean Music Act**: **Skillibeng**; Koffee; Popcaan; Sean Paul; Shenseea; Spice	**Best Producer**: **Inflo**; Jae5; Labrinth; M1onthebeat; P2J; TSB
**Best Performance in a TV Show/Film**: **Kano as Sully – Top Boy**; Damson Idris as Franklin Saint – Snowfall; Daniel Kaluuya as Otis "Oj" Haywood Jr. – Nope; Jasmine Jobson as Jaq – Top Boy; Lashana Lynch as Nomi – No Time to Die; Samuel Adewunmi as Hero – You Don't Know Me	**Best Media Personality**: **Nella Rose**; Big Zuu; Chuckie Online; Chunkz; Harry Pinero; KSI; Mo Gilligan; Munya Chawawa; Yung Filly; Zeze Millz

=== Special awards ===
Lifetime Achievement Award

- **Nile Rodgers**

Outstanding Contribution Award

- **Craig David**

Paving The Way Award

- **Jamal Edwards**
