= MOBO Awards 2020 =

2020 edition of award ceremony

- Awarded for: Excellence in music of black origin
- Date: 9 December 2020
- Location: Exhibition London, London, England
- Country: United Kingdom
- Hosted by: Maya Jama; Chunkz

Highlights
- Most wins: Nines and Mahalia (2 each)
- Most nominations: Nines (5 nominations)
- Album of the Year: Nines – Crabs in a Bucket
- Website: mobo.com

Television/radio coverage
- Network: YouTube (live coverage); BBC One (highlights)

The MOBO Awards 2020 ceremony was held at Exhibition London on 9 December 2020 without a live audience due to tier regulations, and was live streamed on YouTube. This was the first award ceremony by MOBO since late 2017. Originally scheduled for 12 November 2020 at Wembley Arena, the ceremony was delayed and rescheduled to 9 December 2020. Highlights were also broadcast on BBC One.

Nominees were announced on 24 November 2020, with rapper Nines leading the field on five nominations. On the night, Nines and Mahalia were the top winners, each taking home two awards.

== Performers ==
The following artists performed at the ceremony, with the line-up announced on 24 November 2020.

List of performers at the MOBO Awards 2020
Artist(s)
Ms Banks
Headie One featuring M Huncho
Tiana Major9
Young T & Bugsey
Tiwa Savage
H.E.R.
Shaybo
Kojey Radical
Davido

== Winners and nominees ==
Winners appear first and highlighted in bold.

**Album of the Year**: **Crabs in a Bucket – Nines**; Big Conspiracy – J Hus; Heavy Is the Head – Stormzy; Love and Compromise – Mahalia; Lianne La Havas – Lianne La Havas	**Song of the Year**: **"Don't Rush" – Young T & Bugsey featuring Headie One**; "Woi" – Digga D; "Gangsta" – Darkoo featuring One Acen; "I Dunno" – Tion Wayne featuring Stormzy & Dutchavelli; "On Deck" – Abra Cadabra
**Best Newcomer**: **Aitch**; Alicaì Harley; Darkoo; Dutchavelli; Ivorian Doll; M1llionz; Miraa May; Pa Salieu; Shaybo; Tiana Major9; M Huncho; Loski	**Video of the Year**: **NSG – "Lupita" (Director: Kevin Hudson)**; Bree Runway – "Apeshit" (Director: Will Hooper); Nines – "Clout" (Director: Charlie Di Placido); Jorja Smith – "By Any Means" (Director: Otis Dominique); Knucks – "Home" (Director: Ray Fiasco); Kojey Radical – "20/20" (Director: Charlie Di Placido)
**Best Female Act**: **Mahalia**; Lianne La Havas; Ms Banks; Tiana Major9; Darkoo; FKA Twigs	**Best Male Act**: **Headie One**; J Hus; Stormzy; Nines; AJ Tracey; Young T & Bugsey
**Best Grime Act**: **Jme**; Ghetts; P Money; Manga Saint Hilare; Capo Lee	**Best Soul/R&B Act**: **Mahalia**; Lianne La Havas; Michael Kiwanuka; Tiana Major9; WSTRN
**Best Hip Hop Act**: **Nines**; J Hus; Ms Banks; D-Block Europe; Krept & Konan; Potter Payper	**Best International Act**: **Burna Boy**; Drake; Koffee; Megan Thee Stallion; Pop Smoke; Popcaan; Roddy Ricch; Rema; Shenseea; Summer Walker; H.E.R; Lil Baby
**Best Gospel Act**: **CalledOut Music**; Guvna B; Noel Robinson; The Kingdom Choir; Shekinah	**Best African Music Act**: **Wizkid**; Burna Boy; Tiwa Savage; Davido; Fireboy DML; Rema; Master KG; Adekunle Gold; NSG; Afro B; Stonebwoy; Shatta Wale
**Best Reggae Act**: **Buju Banton**; Koffee; Lila Iké; Popcaan; Protoje	**Best Jazz Act**: **Ego Ella May**; Moses Boyd; Joe Armon-Jones; Tom Misch & Yussef Dayes; Yazmin Lacey
**Best Producer**: **Jae5**; 808 Melo; Sir Spyro; TSB; Steel Banglez; M1OnTheBeat	**Best Performance in a TV Show/Film**: **Micheal Ward – Blue Story as Marco**; Kane Robinson – Top Boy as Sully; Michaela Coel – I May Destroy You as Arabella; Ncuti Gatwa – Sex Education as Eric Effiong; Jessica Plummer – EastEnders as Chantelle; Damson Idris – Snowfall as Franklin Saint
**Best Media Personality**: **Chunkz**; Munya Chawawa; Yung Filly; Mo Gilligan; Clara Amfo; Maya Jama; Henrie Kwushue; KSI; Harry Pinero; Zeze Millz
**MOBO Inspiration Award** **Steve McQueen**
