= MOBO Awards =

Annual music awards in Britain

The MOBO Awards
- Current: MOBO Awards 2026
- Awarded for: Excellence in music of black origin
- Location: Various (in 2026, Manchester)
- Country: United Kingdom
- Presented by: MOBO Organisation
- First award: 1996; 30 years ago
- Website: www.mobo.com

Television/radio coverage
- Network: Carlton Television (1996–1997); Channel 4 (1998–2003); BBC One (2004–2013, 2020–present); BBC Three (2006–2013); ITV2 and ITV (2014–2016); Channel 5 and BET (2017); YouTube (2020–2025); Twitch (2026–present)

The MOBO Awards (Music of Black Origin, also known as the MOBOs) is an annual English music award presentation honouring achievements in "music of Black origin", including hip-hop, grime, UK Drill, R&B, soul, reggae, jazz, gospel, and Bantu music.

The MOBO Awards were founded by Kanya King and Andy Ruffell. The first ever award was presented to Baby D, in the Best Dance Act category. The inaugural awards were broadcast by Carlton Television from London's Connaught Rooms.

In 2009, the ceremony was held for the first time in Glasgow. Prior to that, it had been held in London. In 2011, the ceremony returned for a second time to Scotland. The awards then moved to Leeds for the first time in 2015 and returned there in 2017 before going on hiatus the following year. In 2020 it was confirmed it would be returning later that year, however for the first time ever it would be live streamed on YouTube. For the first time, Sheffield hosted in 2024 with Newcastle announced as the 2025 host city. In September 2025, Manchester was announced as next year's host city.

Across its history, the MOBOs have been broadcast on Channel 4, BBC Television (BBC One and later BBC Three), ITV2, Channel 5 and BET before returning to the BBC in 2020.

== Ceremonies ==
The ceremony was first broadcast regionally on Carlton Television from 1996 to 1997, before airing nationwide on Channel 4 from 1998 until 2003. From 2004 to 2013, they were aired by the BBC; beginning in 2006, the show aired live on BBC Three, and highlights aired on BBC One.

In 2014, the BBC dropped the MOBO Awards, and the ceremony moved to ITV under a three-year deal, airing on ITV2 with same-night highlights on ITV.

In 2017, the ceremony moved to Channel 5 and BET.

In 2018, the MOBO Organisation announced that the ceremony would take a one-year hiatus in order to plan a "bigger, revamped show" in 2019. However, the show was delayed, with organisers planning to hold the ceremony on 12 November 2020 instead; Kanya King stated that there would be "positive changes" to the show, and that they would be "returning with even more determination and energy to support and boost our culture wherever we can."

Amazon Music was announced as Official Digital Music Streaming Partner for the 2026 ceremony in March, revealing that the ceremony would be livestreamed on the Amazon Music UK Twitch channel.

=== Table summary ===
| No. | Date | First broadcast | Best Album | Best Single | Honorary awards | Broadcaster | Host(s) | Venue |
|---|---|---|---|---|---|---|---|---|
| 1 | 18 November 1996 | 21 November 1996 | Timeless – Goldie | "Give Me a Little More Time" – Gabrielle | Lionel Richie; Jazzie B | Carlton Television (ITV) | Sonya Saul | New Connaught Rooms, London |
| 2 | 10 November 1997 | 13 November 1997 | Travelling Without Moving – Jamiroquai | "I Wanna Be the Only One" – Eternal ft. BeBe Winans | Bootsy Collins; Mick Hucknall | Carlton Television (ITV) | Lisa I'Anson | New Connaught Rooms, London |
| 3 | 14 October 1998 | 15 October 1998 | Colours – Adam F | "Freak Me" – Another Level | B. B. King; Sean Combs | Channel 4 | Mel B and Bill Bellamy | Royal Albert Hall |
| 4 | 6 October 1999 | 7 October 1999 | Prodigal Sista – Beverley Knight | "My Love" – Kele Le Roc | Tina Turner; Erskine Thompson | Channel 4 | Mel B and Wyclef Jean | Royal Albert Hall |
| 5 | 4 October 2000 | 5 October 2000 | Rise – Gabrielle | "Fill Me In" – Craig David | LA Reid; Aswad | Channel 4 | Lisa 'Left Eye' Lopes and Trevor Nelson | Alexandra Palace |
| 6 | 4 October 2001 | 6 October 2001 | 8701 – Usher | "Independent Women Part 1" – Destiny's Child | Luther Vandross; R Kelly | Channel 4 | Trevor Nelson and Kelis | London Arena |
| 7 | 1 October 2002 | 3 October 2002 | Songs in A Minor – Alicia Keys | "It Takes More" – Ms Dynamite | Chaka Khan; Jimmy Cliff; Street Politiks | Channel 4 | Alesha Dixon and LL Cool J | London Arena |
| 8 | 25 September 2003 | 4 October 2003 | Get Rich Or Die Tryin' – 50 Cent | "In Da Club" – 50 Cent | George Benson; Kool & The Gang; Lil' Kim | Channel 4 | Lil' Kim and Blu Cantrell | Royal Albert Hall |
| 9 | 30 September 2004 | 6 October 2004 | The College Dropout – Kanye West | "Thank You" – Jamelia | Anita Baker; Janet Jackson | BBC One | Mos Def | Royal Albert Hall |
| 10 | 22 September 2005 | 23 September 2005 | Time To Grow – Lemar | "Pow! (Forward)" – Lethal B | Public Enemy; Bob Marley and the Wailers | BBC One | Gina Yashere and Akon | Royal Albert Hall |
| 11 | 20 September 2006 | 22 September 2006 | —N/a | "Déjà Vu" – Beyoncé | Sam Moore; Anti-Slavery International | BBC One (highlights); BBC Three (live coverage) | Gina Yashere and Coolio | Royal Albert Hall |
| 12 | 19 September 2007 | | —N/a | "Because of You" – NeYo | —N/a | BBC One (highlights); BBC Three (live coverage) | Jamelia and Shaggy | The O2 Arena |
| 13 | 15 October 2008 | | Spirit – Leona Lewis | "American Boy" – Estelle | Mary Wilson | BBC One (highlights); BBC Three (live coverage) | Mel B and Rev. Run | Wembley Arena |
| 14 | 30 September 2009 | | Uncle B – N-Dubz | "Beat Again" – JLS | Michael Jackson | BBC One (highlights); BBC Three (live coverage) | Reggie Yates and Keri Hilson | SEC Centre |
| 15 | 20 October 2010 | | JLS – JLS | "Playing With Fire" – N-Dubz ft. Mr Hudson | Billy Ocean | BBC One (highlights); BBC Three (live coverage) | Alesha Dixon and Reggie Yates | Echo Arena Liverpool |
| 16 | 5 October 2011 | | Who You Are – Jessie J | "Do It Like A Dude" – Jessie J | Boyz II Men | BBC One (highlights); BBC Three (live coverage) | Alesha Dixon and Jason Derulo | SEC Centre |
| 17 | 3 November 2012 | | Our Version of Events – Emeli Sandé | "Earthquake" – Labrinth ft. Tinie Tempah | Dionne Warwick; TLC | BBC One (highlights); BBC Three (live coverage) | Miquita Oliver and Adam Deacon | Echo Arena Liverpool |
| 18 | 19 October 2013 | | Home – Rudimental | "La La La" – Naughty Boy | Stephen Lawrence Trust | BBC One (highlights); BBC Three (live coverage) | Trevor Nelson and Sarah-Jane Crawford | SSE Hydro |
| 19 | 22 October 2014 | | In the Lonely Hour – Sam Smith | "Stay with Me" – Sam Smith | Idris Elba (Inspiration) | ITV2 (live coverage); ITV (deferred) | Mel B and Sarah-Jane Crawford | Wembley Arena |
| 20 | 4 November 2015 | | The Long Way Home – Krept and Konan | "Shutdown" – Skepta | Lenny Henry; CeeLo Green | ITV2 (live coverage); ITV (deferred) | Sarah-Jane Crawford | First Direct Arena |
| 21 | 4 November 2016 | | Made in the Manor – Kano | "Robbery (remix)" – Abra Cadabra ft. Krept & Konan | Nicola Adams; Ms. Dynamite | ITV2 (live coverage); ITV (deferred) | Rickie Haywood-Williams and Melvin Odoom | SSE Hydro |
| 22 | 29 November 2017 | | Gang Signs & Prayer – Stormzy | "Did You See" – J Hus | Idris Elba (Paving The Way) | Channel 5 (deferred); BET (highlights) | Maya Jama and Marvin Humes | First Direct Arena |
| 23 | 9 December 2020 | | Crabs in a Bucket – Nines | "Don't Rush" – Young T & Bugsey feat. Headie One | Steve McQueen | YouTube (live coverage); BBC One (highlights) | Maya Jama and Chunkz | Virtual |
| 24 | 5 December 2021 | 8 December 2021 | We're All Alone in This Together – Dave | "Body" – Russ Millions and Tion Wayne | Frank Bruno (Inspiration) | YouTube (live coverage); BBC One (highlights) | Leigh-Anne Pinnock, Munya Chawawa and Eddie Kadi | CBS Arena, Coventry |
| 25 | 30 November 2022 | 7 December 2022 | Alpha Place – Knucks and Sometimes I Might Be Introvert – Little Simz | "Own Brand (Baddie)" – Dreya Mac, Felixthe1st and Finch Fetti | Nile Rodgers; Craig David; Jamal Edwards | YouTube (live coverage); BBC One (highlights) | Chunkz and Yung Filly | Wembley Arena |
| 26 | 7 February 2024 | 9 February 2024 | Real Back in Style – Potter Payper | "Sprinter" – Central Cee and Dave | Soul II Soul; Sugababes; Ghetts; Jessica Ennis-Hill | YouTube (live coverage); BBC One (highlights) | Indiyah Polack and Babatunde Aléshé | Sheffield Arena |
| 27 | 18 February 2025 | 21 February 2025 | Being Poor Is Expensive – Bashy | "Favourite Girl" – Darkoo feat. Dess Dior | Vybz Kartel (Impact); Denise Lewis (Paving The Way) | YouTube (live coverage); BBC One (highlights) | Indiyah Polack and Eddie Kadi | Newcastle Arena |
| 28 | 26 March 2026 | 27 March 2026 | The Art of Loving – Olivia Dean | "Man I Need" – Olivia Dean | Pharrell Williams (Global Songwriter); Slick Rick (Lifetime Achievement) | Twitch (live coverage); BBC One (highlights) | Eve and Eddie Kadi | Co-op Live |

== History ==
Kanya King launched the MOBO awards in 1996 with business partner Andy Ruffell, aiming to establish a platform for music that, according to King, encompasses urban, hip-hop, R&B and reggae.

=== 1990s ===
==== 1996 ====
- Best Album: Goldie – Timeless
- Best Single: Gabrielle – "Give Me a Little More Time"
- Best Newcomer: Peace by Piece
- Best Video: Tupac Shakur featuring Dr. Dre and Roger Troutman – "California Love"
- Best Hip-Hop Act: Blak Twang
- Best R&B Act: Mark Morrison
- Best Reggae Act: Peter Hunnigale
- Best Gospel Act: New Colours
- Best Jazz Act: Courtney Pine
- Best Dance Act: Baby D
- Best Jungle Act: Goldie
- Best DJ: Trevor Nelson
- Best International Act: Fugees
- Best International Single: Fugees – "Killing Me Softly"
- Outstanding Contribution to Black Music: Jazzie B
- Lifetime Achievement Award: Lionel Richie

==== 1997 ====
The 1997 award ceremony was held at London's New Connaught Rooms on 10 November. The gala included performances by Mary J. Blige and Eternal.

- Best Dance Act: The Prodigy
- Best R&B Act: Shola Ama
- Best Hip Hop: Funky DL
- Best International Hip Hop: Coolio
- Best Reggae Act: Finley Quaye
- Best Jungle Act: Roni Size and Reprazent
- Best Single: Eternal
- Best Video: Will Smith
- Best International Act: Blackstreet
- Best Album: Jamiroquai
- Best Newcomer: Shola Ama
- Best Unsigned Act: Fola Sade
- Best International Reggae Act: Beenie Man
- Best Producer: Sean Puffy Combs
- Best Radio DJ: David Rodigan
- Best Club DJ: Metalheadz
- Best Jazz Act: Sunship
- Best Gospel Act: Beehive
- Best International Single: Rosie Gaines "Closer Than Close"
- Outstanding Achievement: Mick Hucknall
- Lifetime Achievement: Bootsy Collins

==== 1998 ====
The Malibu MOBO Awards show was held at The Royal Albert Hall and hosted by Mel B and Bill Bellamy. It was broadcast nationally by Channel 4. Performers and presenters included footballer Sol Campbell, girl band All Saints, DJ Trevor Nelson, boxers Lennox Lewis and Chris Eubank, Puff Daddy, Chaka Khan, Goldie, Another Level, and Martine McCutcheon. Contribution to Black Music went to Carl McIntosh and B. B. King won the Lifetime Achievement Award.

- Best Dance Act: Stardust
- Best Reggae Act: Glamma Kid
- Best Drum and Bass: 4 Hero
- Best Hip Hop Act: Pheobe 1
- Best Unsigned Act: Allyson Brown
- Best Newcomer: Lynden David Hall
- Best R&B Act: Beverley Knight
- Best International Reggae: Beenie Man
- Contribution to Music: Carl McIntosh
- Best Video: All Saints
- Best International Act: Puff Daddy and the Family
- Best International Single: Pras feat ODB / Mýa
- Best Single: Another Level
- Best Album: Adam F
- Outstanding Achievement: Sean Combs
- Lifetime Achievement: B. B. King

==== 1999 ====
The 1999 Malibu MOBO Awards award ceremony was held at The Royal Albert Hall, sponsored by Malibu and hosted by Mel B and Wyclef Jean. International Hip-Hop Act Award went to Jay-Z, Best Album was awarded to Beverley Knight, International Act to Lauryn Hill and Lifetime Achievement Award to Tina Turner. Performers and presenters included Des'ree, Dru Hill, Method Man & Redman, Tim Westwood, Lionel Richie, Lulu, Victoria Beckham, Chris Eubank, Another Level, Ladysmith Black Mambazo, Destiny's Child, and girl band Eternal.

- Best International R&B Act: Destiny's Child
- Best Newcomer: Kele Le Roc
- Best International Act: Lauryn Hill
- Best Hip Hop Act: Roots Manuva
- Best International Hip Hop Act: Jay-Z
- Best Dance Act: Shanks & Bigfoot
- Best Video: TLC – "No Scrubs"
- Best Album: Beverley Knight – Prodigal Sista
- Best DJ: Trevor Nelson
- Best Single: Kele Le Roc
- Best Unsigned Act: Amoyé
- Best International Single: Eminem – "My Name Is"
- Best Reggae Act: Mr Vegas
- Contribution to Music: Erskine Thompson
- Best R&B Act: Beverley Knight
- Lifetime Achievement Award: Tina Turner

=== 2000s ===
==== 2000 ====
The MOBO Awards 2000 ceremony took place at Alexandra Palace, hosted by Trevor Nelson and Lisa Left Eye Lopes and sponsored by Mastercard. There show opened with a performance of Money by Jamelia featuring Beenie Man. Craig David performed an acoustic medley of Fill Me In, 7 Days and Nice & Slow by Usher, Sade exclusively performed By Your Side, Gabrielle performed Rise, MJ Cole performed Crazy Love featuring Elizabeth Troy, Donell Jones performed U Know What's Up featuring ceremony host, Lisa 'Left Eye' Lopes. The show closed with a performance of Who Let The Dogs Out by Baha Men.

In addition to their performances, Craig David, Jamelia, Beenie Man, MJ Cole and Gabrielle also won awards. With Craig David receiving three awards in total.

Award presenters included MOBO Award founder, Kanya King, Honeyz, Melanie Sykes amongst others.

- Best Newcomer: Craig David
- Best Video: Jamelia – Money
- Best Hip Hop Act: Eminem
- Best Reggae Act: Beenie Man
- Best Gospel Act: Mary Mary
- Best Jazz Act: Ronny Jordan
- Best World Music Act: Carlos Santana
- Best UK Garage Act: DJ Luck & MC Neat
- Best Producer: MJ Cole
- Best UK Radio DJ: Tim Westwood
- Best UK Club: Steve Sutherland
- MOBO Unsigned Award: Cherise
- Outstanding Contribution to Music: Aswad
- Outstanding Achievement: L.A. Reid
- Best UK Single: "Fill Me In" by Craig David
- Best UK Album: Rise by Gabrielle

==== 2002 ====
- Best R&B Act: Ashanti

==== 2003 ====
In 2003, the MOBO awards show moved to The Royal Albert Hall and was hosted by Blu Cantrell and Lil' Kim, with performances from DMX, Lumidee, Wayne Wonder, George Benson, Lemar, Seal, Mis-Teeq and Redman, J'Nay John Adeleye, Big Brovaz, Black Eyed Peas and Kool and the Gang. Among the winners of the night were: 50 Cent, Justin Timberlake, Big Brovaz and Lisa Maffia, who was the only UK female artist to win an award.

==== 2004 ====
The ninth awards ceremony took place on 30 September 2004 at The Royal Albert Hall and was broadcast by BBC Television. Janet Jackson received the icon award. So Solid Crew won the award in the UK garage Act category award beating Dizzee Rascal and the Streets. Controversy surrounded the removal of reggae artists Vybz Kartel and Elephant Man from the "Best Reggae Act" category at the 2004 awards due to their homophobia and incitement to murder.

==== 2005 ====
The 2005 awards show saw one of the biggest line-ups in MOBO award history, including John Legend, Ms Dynamite, Lemar, Kano, Damien Marley, Public Enemy and Lauryn Hill. The event was hosted by Gina Yashere and Akon at The Royal Albert Hall, with guest presenters Chris Eubank, Lisa Maffia, Josie Darby, Simon Webbe, Myleene Klass, Estelle, Tim Westwood, Kwame Kwei-Armah and Chuck D. Big winners on the night included Corrine Bailey-Rae, Lemar, Black Eyed Peas, Rihanna, Sean Paul and Beyoncé.

- Best Album: Time to Grow by Lemar
- Best Hip-Hop Act: Sway, Dcypha Productions
- Best Jazz Act: Rhian Benson
- Best R&B Act: John Legend
- Best Reggae Act: Damien Marley, Welcome to Jamrock
- Best Single: "Pow! (Forward)" by Lethal Bizzle featuring Fumin, D Double E, Napper, Jamakabi, Neeko, Flowdan, Ozzie B, Forcer, Demon and Hotshot
- Best UK Club DJ: Steve Sutherland
- Best UK Newcomer: Kano
- Best UK Radio DJ: Tim Westwood
- Best Video: "Drop It Like It's Hot" by Snoop Dogg and Pharrell Williams
- Best World Music Act: Daddy Yankee
- UK Act of the Year: Lemar
- Best African Act: Youssou N'Dour
- Lifetime Achievement Award: Bob Marley
- Outstanding Contribution: Public Enemy

==== 2006 ====
In 2006 the awards ceremony was hosted by Coolio and Gina Yashere at The Royal Albert Hall. For the first time the World Music and Jazz categories were suspended. Corinne Bailey Rae won the prize for Best UK Newcomer and Jai Amore won Best Unsigned Act. British rapper Akala won Best Hip Hop Act, beating stiff competition from American acts such as Kanye West, 50 Cent, and the Game.

==== 2007 ====
The 2007 awards ceremony was broadcast live on BBC Three from the O2 Arena in London and hosted by Shaggy and Jamelia. The jazz category returned. Shaggy opened the evening with a medley. T-Pain performed on stage with Yung Joc, Craig David and Kano collaborated on stage; Ne-Yo, Mutya Buena and Robin Thicke also performed. Amy Winehouse performed two songs and accepted the award for Best UK Female. N-Dubz won Best Newcomer. England cricketer Monty Panesar and England footballer Micah Richards were among a line up of guests presenting individual awards which also included Sinitta and Quentin Tarantino.

==== 2008 ====
- Best Album: Leona Lewis, Spirit
- Best Song: Estelle, "American Boy"
- Best Uk Male:: Dizzee Rascal
- Best Uk Female: Estelle
- Best Uk Newcomer: Chipmunk
- Best Video: Leona Lewis, "Bleeding Love"
- Best Hip Hop Act: Lil Wayne
- Best R&B/Soul Act: Chris Brown
- Best Reggae Act: Mavado
- Best Gospel Act: Jahaziel
- Best Jazz Act: YolanDa Brown
- Best African Act: 9ice
- Best International Act: Chris Brown
- Best Club DJ: Tim Westwood
- Best Radio DJ: Tim Westwood
- Be Mobo: Ricky McCalla
- Lifetime Achievement: Mary Wilson

==== 2009 ====
The 2009 awards event took place on 30 September at the SEC Centre in Glasgow, the first time the MOBO awards show took place outside London. A tribute performance was dedicated to Michael Jackson, and the Young Soul Rebels performed their charity single "I Got Soul". Reggie Yates and Keri Hilson hosted the awards show, with Peter Andre presenting backstage.

=== 2010s ===
==== 2010 ====
The awards ceremony took place on 20 October 2010 in Liverpool.

- Best Newcomer: Tinie Tempah
- Best UK Hip-Hop/Grime Act: Professor Green
- Best African Act: K'Naan
- Best Video: Tinie Tempah ft. Labrinth – Frisky
- Best Reggae Act: Gyptian
- Best Jazz Act: Empirical
- Best Gospel Act: Guvna B
- Best UK R&B/Soul Act: Plan B
- Best International Act: Eminem
- Best UK Act: JLS
- Best Song: N-Dubz ft Mr Hudson – Playing With Fire
- Best Album: JLS
- Lifetime Achievement: Billy Ocean

==== 2011 ====
The awards show returned to Glasgow's SEC Centre on 5 October 2011, hosted by Jason Derülo and Alesha Dixon. Jessie J won four awards, making her the biggest winner of the night. Boyz II Men received the award for Outstanding Contribution to Music. Other winners included Rihanna, Tinie Tempah, Adele and Alborosie. Amy Winehouse was given an award and a special tribute, following her death in July 2011.

- Best Gospel: Triple O
- Best Jazz: Kairos Quartet
- Best Reggae: Alborosie
- Best African Act: Wizkid
- Best Song: Jessie J
- Best R&B/Soul: Adele
- Best Album: Jessie J
- Best Hip Hop/Grime: Tinie Tempah
- Best Video: Tinchy Stryder ft. Dappy
- Best Newcomer: Jessie J
- Best International: Rihanna

==== 2012 ====
The 17th Awards show took place on 3 November 2012 at the Liverpool Arena. Presented by Miquita Oliver and Adam Deacon – with backstage support from Rickie and Melvin – the night saw Trey Songz, Conor Maynard, Emeli Sandé, Misha B, JLS, Stooshe, Labrinth, Angel and Wiley perform.

Emeli Sandé won awards for Best Female, Best Album and Best R&B/Soul while Plan B took Best Male Act and Best Hip Hop/Grime. TLC were awarded Outstanding Contribution to Music, with Dionne Warwick receiving the MOBO Lifetime Achievement Award. The full list of winners where:

- Best Gospel: Rachel Kerr
- Best Jazz: Zoe Rahman
- Best Reggae: Sean Paul
- Best African Act: D'Banj
- Best Song: Labrinth ft. Tinie Tempah, "Earthquake"
- Best R&B/Soul: Emeli Sandé
- Best Album: Emeli Sandé
- Best Hip Hop/Grime: Plan B
- Best Video: JLS
- Best Female Act: Emeli Sandé
- Best Male Act: Plan B
- Best Newcomer: Rita Ora
- Best International: Nicki Minaj

==== 2013 ====
The 18th Awards show took place on 19 October 2013 and was held at the SSE Hydro in Glasgow. It was hosted by Trevor Nelson and Sarah-Jane Crawford. Performances included Tinie Tempah, Iggy Azalea, Naughty Boy, Rudimental and Jahméne Douglas.

===== Winners =====
- Best Male Act: Wiley
- Best Female Act: Laura Mvula
- Best Song: Naughty Boy, "La La La"
- Best Album: Rudimental, Home
- Best Newcomer: Krept and Konan, ft. "Dizzy" Daniel Moorehead
- Best R&B/Soul: Laura Mvula
- Best UK Hip Hop/Grime: Tinie Tempah
- Best Video: Naughty Boy, "La La La"
- Best Gospel: Lurine Cato
- Best Jazz: Sons of Kemet
- Best Reggae: Sean Paul
- Best African Act: Fuse ODG
- Best International: Kendrick Lamar

==== 2014 ====
The 19th Awards show took place on 22 October 2014 and was held at The SSE Arena in London. It was hosted by Mel B and Sarah-Jane Crawford. It was broadcast live on ITV2 for the first time.

===== Performances =====
- Professor Green feat Tori Kelly – Lullaby
- Jessie J feat Kid Ink – Bang Bang + Burnin' Up
- Krept & Konan & The All Stars – Don't Waste My Time
- Fekky & Meridan Dan – Still Sittin Here + German Whip
- Candi Staton & Little Simz – You've Got The Love
- Jeremih feat Krept & Konan – Don't Tell 'Em
- Ella Eyre – Comeback
- Nicole Scherzinger – On The Rocks
- Gorgon City Feat. MNEK & Jess Glynne – Ready For Your Love + Right Here

===== Winners =====
- Best African Act: Fuse ODG
- Best Album: Sam Smith, In the Lonely Hour
- Best Female Act: Jessie J
- Best Gospel Act: Living Faith Connection Choir
- Best Grime Act: Stormzy
- Best Hip Hop Act: Krept and Konan
- Best International Artist: Beyoncé
- Best Jazz Act: Zara McFarlane
- Best Male Act: Sam Smith
- Best Newcomer: Ella Eyre
- Best R&B/Soul Act: Sam Smith
- Best Reggae Act: Stylo G
- Best Song: Sam Smith, "Stay with Me"
- Best Video: Skepta ft. JME, "That's Not Me"

== MOBO UnSung Awards ==
MOBO UnSung is a biennial talent competition for unsigned acts, showcasing the next generation of urban artists. The ten finalists (unusually increased to eleven in 2018 due to the high numbers of entrants), are narrowed down to a top three, which the winner is then picked from.

Since its return in 2022, there is no overall competition winner; instead, the ten finalists each receive prizes and enter into a nine month-long artist development programme that includes studio time, live performance opportunities, mentoring, business and legal training, marketing and promotion, grants, and networking with key players in the music industry.

=== 2012 ===
- Winner – Esco Williams.

=== 2013 ===
- Winner – In'Sight.

=== 2014 ===
- Finalists – Basheba, Blizzard, Eyez, Geovarn, Hayley May, J The Exodus, Mic Lowry, One 50, Tiana Major9 and YJ.
- Top 3 – Tiana Major9, Mic Lowry, and YJ.
- Winner – Mic Lowry.

=== 2016 ===
- Finalists – Alika, Mullally, Mega Keggwa, Reekz MB, Juls, Tion Wayne, Liz Lubega, WildBoyAce, Jay Alexzander, and U.G.
- Top 3 – Alika, Mega Keggwa, and Mullally.
- Winner – Alika.

=== 2018 ===
- Finalists – Estée Blu, Fred Fredas, Fonzie, Graft, Harris Hameed, Ike Chuks, Jordz The Jay, Kris Evans, Marika, Sakyi 4, and Suelily.
- Top 3 – Fred Fredas, Graft, and Ike Chuks.
- Winner – Graft.

=== 2022 ===
- Finalists – A30, Adreyn Cash, Crae Wolf, Genesis Elijah, JClarke, Jordan Adetunji, Mace The Great, Natalie Lindi, Sarah Ikumu, and Zitah.

=== 2023 ===
- Finalists – Ace Clvrk, Bea Anderson, Deja, Josh Barry, Kaniva, NEOne The Wonderer, Young Athena, Gabriel Sanches, Melica and Shack Santima.

== Criticism ==
The MOBOs have faced criticism for having become increasingly oriented towards "commercial" urban music, and having given nominations and awards to musicians who are not Black. In 2003, a boycott effort emerged after the American pop musicians Justin Timberlake and Christina Aguilera won the awards for Best R&B Act and Best Video respectively. The Independent described the wins as being the result of the "white appropriation of Black music". A MOBO spokesperson defended their presence, stating that the awards were designed to honour achievements in music of Black origin, regardless of the ethnicity of their performers, and cited the increasing worldwide growth of urban music at the time.

In 2006, DJ and music journalist Bigger wrote that the presentation had been "veering away from its concept of rewarding music of Black origin" as early as its third edition, noting its increasing dominance by American acts at the expense of domestic acts. He argued that the show had become "little more than a pat on the back and a jolly boys' outing for major labels and American acts."

In 2011, Lanre Bakare wrote in The Guardian that the show was being affected by the music industry's dilution of the distinctive Black music scene, promoting it to mainstream audiences as popular music (including "manufactured", U.S.-style hip-hop and R&B). In the column, it was noted that Labrinth had criticized the nominations of Conor Maynard and Ed Sheeran for awards, while Charlie Dark of Attica Blues argued that the MOBOs needed to promote innovation in Black music, and "shouldn't be an annual event where everyone pats themselves on the back for very small advances that they've made, when they are powerful enough to bring real change. If they don't adapt, artists who aren't interested in commercial pop and being put in musical boxes will just do their own thing."

In 2020, English rock duo Nova Twins wrote an open letter on Twitter addressed to the MOBOs concerning the lack of a Rock/Alternative category, despite the fact that many POC have contributed to the evolution of rock music, and still are to this day, and hoping "that a Rock/Alternative category will be added to the MOBO (Music of Black Origin) Awards in 2021, recognising the POC contributors to the genre". The MOBOS later replied on Twitter that "the MOBO Awards Judging Panel have actually discussed this and ... will continue to review potential category expansions for future Award ceremonies."

== See also ==
- British Black music
- UK gospel
