= Don't Look Down (Kojey Radical album) =

Studio album by Kojey Radical
- Released: 19 September 2025
- Genre: Hip-hop
- Length: 46:16
- Labels: Asylum; Atlantic
- Producers: Swindle; Kojey Radical; Show N Prove; Jacob Manson; Owen Cutts; Ashton Sellars; Emil; JD Reid; KZ; Elevated; youxl; Sipho

Kojey Radical chronology
Reason to Smile (2022)	Don't Look Down (2025)

Singles from Don't Look Down
- 1. "Rule One" Released: 29 May 2025; 2. "Conversation" Released: 10 July 2025; 3. "Expensive" Released: 28 August 2025

Don't Look Down is the second studio album by the British rapper Kojey Radical. It was released on 19 September 2025 by Asylum Records and Atlantic Records, under licence to Warner Music UK. The album follows Radical's 2022 debut studio album Reason to Smile and includes guest appearances from Bawo, MNEK, Dende, James Vickery, Planet Giza, Cristale, Benjamin AD, Col3trane, Solomon, Victor Ray, Jaz Karis, Ghetts and Chrissi.

Don't Look Down was preceded by the singles "Rule One", "Conversation" and "Expensive". On Metacritic, the album has a weighted average score of 92 out of 100, based on four critic reviews. It was nominated for Album of the Year at the 2026 MOBO Awards and peaked at number 59 on the UK Albums Chart and at number one on the UK Hip Hop and R&B Albums Chart.

== Background and music ==
In Apple Music's album notes, Radical described Don't Look Down as documenting a transition into adulthood. The notes identify the album's inspirations as a Fashion Week afterparty and a birthday celebration for a childhood friend, events that led Radical to consider his relationship with success and old friendships. The album's narrative is set around a party and closes with "Baby Boy", a track centred on fatherhood.

Writing for the Independent, Roisin O'Connor wrote that the album develops ideas of fatherhood, love and self-doubt. Calum Skuodas of the Skinny described the album as a blend of jazz, rap and R&B, and compared Radical's cadence and wordplay to Kano. DIY reviewer Tom Morgan wrote that the album combines live recording with electronic beats and shifts lyrically between confidence and uncertainty.

== Release and promotion ==
"Rule One" featuring Bawo was released on 29 May 2025 as the first single of Don't Look Down. "Conversation" was released on 10 July 2025, and Radical announced the album alongside the single the following day. "Expensive" featuring Planet Giza was released on 28 August 2025 as another single from the album. The full track listing was announced on 1 September 2025.

== Critical reception ==
Don't Look Down ratings
Aggregate scores
Source	Rating
Metacritic	92/100
Review scores
Source	Rating
Clash	8/10
DIY	4/5 stars
The Skinny	4/5 stars

On Metacritic, Don't Look Down has a weighted average score of 92 out of 100, based on four critic reviews, which the website categorises as "universal acclaim".

O'Connor called it Radical's best album to date and praised it as an outstanding follow-up to Reason to Smile. Skuodas wrote that the album lacked "knockout punches" that would place Radical at the top of UK rap, but considered it another step in his rise within the alternative scene. Morgan highlighted "Long Day", "Life of the Party" and "Comfortable" as standout tracks. James Kilkenny of Clash gave the album an 8 out of 10 rating.

Don't Look Down was nominated for Album of the Year at the 2026 MOBO Awards.

== Track listing ==
Credits and track lengths are adapted from Qobuz.

Don't Look Down track listing
No.	Title	Producer(s)	Length
1.	"Knock Knock"	Swindle; Kojey Radical	1:47
2.	"Rotation"	Swindle; Show N Prove; Jacob Manson	2:56
3.	"Rule One" (featuring Bawo)	Swindle; Owen Cutts; Ashton Sellars	2:54
4.	"Drinking My Water" (featuring MNEK)	Show N Prove; Manson; Sellars	3:05
5.	"Long Day" (featuring Dende)	Emil; Swindle; Sellars	3:17
6.	"On Call" (featuring James Vickery)	Cutts; JD Reid; Sellars	2:54
7.	"Expensive" (featuring Planet Giza)	Swindle	2:49
8.	"Problems" (featuring Cristale)	Swindle; KZ; Elevated; Sellars	2:16
9.	"Conversation"	Swindle	2:31
10.	"Communication" (featuring Benjamin AD)	Swindle; JD Reid; Sellars	1:04
11.	"Life of the Party"	Emil; Swindle; Sellars	2:34
12.	"Breathe" (featuring Col3trane)	Cutts; JD Reid; Sellars; youxl	4:18
13.	"Curtains" (featuring Solomon; includes Victor Ray outro)	Swindle; Sellars	3:44
14.	"Comfortable" (featuring Jaz Karis)	KZ; JD Reid	3:13
15.	"Everyday"	Swindle; Sipho; Sellars	2:31
16.	"Baby Boy" (featuring Ghetts and Chrissi)	Swindle; KZ; Cutts	4:23
Total length:			46:16

== Charts ==
Don't Look Down peaked at number 59 on the UK Albums Chart and number one on the UK Hip Hop and R&B Albums Chart.

Chart performance for Don't Look Down
Chart (2025)	Peak position
UK Albums (Official Charts)	59
UK R&B Albums (Official Charts)	1
