= Blood Diamond (album) =

Studio album by Unknown T
- Released: 12 January 2024
- Genres: British hip hop; UK drill
- Length: 45:10
- Labels: A Stay Solid Music; Island
- Producers: AyeTM; Beat Butcha; Chucks; Emil; EY; HoneywoodSix; Jae5; James Maddock; Jester; LiTek; R14 Beats; Remedee; Sean Murdz; WhYJay; Dom Valentino

Unknown T chronology
Before the Smoke (2023)	Blood Diamond (2024)

Singles from Blood Diamond
- 1. "Right Hand" Released: 2 March 2023; 2. "Welcome 2 My Strip/Passa/Hard Life" Released: 18 August 2023; 3. "Duppy/Like SZA" Released: 12 October 2023; 4. "Adolescence" Released: 26 October 2023; 5. "Bon Appétit" Released: 23 November 2023; 6. "Hocus Pocus" Released: 11 January 2024

Blood Diamond is the debut full-length studio album by British UK drill rapper Unknown T, released through A Stay Solid Music and Island Records on 12 January 2024. The album is a follow-up to his debut EP, Before the Smoke released in August 2023. The album features guest appearances from 98s, Digga D, Knucks, Loyle Carner, Odumodublvck, Scribz Riley and Tiana Major9, and includes production from AyeTM, Beat Butcha, Chucks, Jae5, Sean Murdz, alongside several other producers.

== Background ==
The album's lead single, "Right Hand" with Knucks was released on 2 March 2023, alongside its official music video. Unknown T then released "Free Slime / Sexy Girls" with Lancey Foux on 27 July 2023, however, the track failed to appear on the album. The single, alongside "Welcome 2 My Strip", featuring Odumodublvck appeared on Before the Smoke, a four-track EP which was released on 18 August 2023, to commemorate the fifth anniversary of his debut, breakout single, "Homerton B". He also released the "Welcome 2 My Strip" music video. Two tracks: "Passa" and "Hard Life" featuring Scribz Riley appears on Blood Diamond. On 12 October 2023, Unknown T joined GRM Daily an performed on their critically acclaimed "Daily Duppy" for the second time and released the two singles: "Duppy" and "Like SZA". On 26 October 2023 Unknown T released "Adolescence", the fourth single to Blood Diamond featuring Digga D. On 20 November 2023, Unknown T had announced a trailer for the album on social media. Just three days later, on 23 November 2023, Unknown T released the final single to the album, "Bon Appètit".

== Track listing ==
Blood Diamond track listing
No.	Title	Writer(s)	Producer(s)	Length
1.	"2023"	Daniel Richie Lena		1:36
2.	"Time"	Lena		2:16
3.	"Welcome 2 My Strip" (featuring Odumodublvck)	Lena; Tochukwu Ojogwu; Jonathan Awote-Mensah	Jae5	2:23
4.	"Hocus Pocus" (featuring Loyle Carner)	Lena; Benjamin Coyle-Larner	Dom Valentino	3:22
5.	"Passa"	Lena; Taras Slusarenko; Jacob Jones	LiTek; WhYJay	2:09
6.	"Adolescence" (featuring Digga D)	Lena; Rhys Herbert; Terry Brown; Norman Beavers	EY	2:51
7.	"Bon Appétit"	Lena; Eliot Dubock; Emil Larbi	Beat Butcha; Emil	3:17
8.	"Ignition Interlude"	Lena		1:37
9.	"Rain" (featuring Tiana Major9)	Lena; Tiana Thomas-Ambersley		2:28
10.	"Right Hand" (with Knucks)	Lena; Ashley Nwachukwu; Charlie Parker; Conor Mulcahy; Luke Honeywood; R14 Beats	Chucks; HoneywoodSix; R14 Beats	2:45
11.	"Aven9ers Assemble" (featuring 98s)	Lena		4:07
12.	"Wisdom & Smoke"	Lena		4:15
13.	"Still in the Mud"	Lena		2:24
14.	"Duppy" (with GRM Daily)	Lena; Thomas Moore; James Maddock; André Molkom; R14 Beats	AyeTM; James Maddock; Jester; R14 Beats	2:12
15.	"Like SZA" (with GRM Daily)	Lena; Larbi	Emil	2:22
16.	"Hard Life" (featuring Scribz Riley)	Lena; Michael Orabiyi; Lightnin' Hopkins; R14 Beats; Aderemi Balogun; Sean Gardener	R14 Beats; Remedee; Sean Murdz	3:03
17.	"Till We Meet Again"	Lena		2:03
Total length:				45:10

== Charts ==
Chart performance for Blood Diamond
Chart (2024)	Peak position
Scottish Albums (Official Charts)	73
UK Albums (Official Charts)	61
UK R&B Albums (Official Charts)	2
