= Reason to Smile =

Studio album by Kojey Radical
- Released: 4 March 2022
- Genres: British hip-hop; gospel; R&B
- Length: 52:20
- Labels: Asylum; Atlantic

Kojey Radical chronology
Cashmere Tears (2019)	Reason to Smile (2022)	Don't Look Down (2025)

Singles from Reason to Smile
- 1. "War Outside" Released: 23 September 2021; 2. "Gangsta" Released: 15 November 2021; 3. "Payback" Released: 15 January 2022; 4. "Silk" Released: 18 February 2022

Reason to Smile is the debut studio album by British rapper Kojey Radical, released 4 March 2022 by Asylum Records and Atlantic Records. It was shortlisted for the 2022 Mercury Prize and nominated for Album of the Year at the 2022 MOBO Awards.

== Background ==
The album was preceded by four singles: "War Outside" released 23 September 2021; "Gangsta" released 15 November; "Payback" released 15 January 2022; and "Silk" released 18 February. The first three came along with music videos while "Silk" received an official visualiser. Another video for "Talkin" released 9 March, featuring animated versions of Radical and the song's guests Tiana Major9 and Kelis.

== Reception ==
Reason to Smile ratings
Aggregate scores
Source	Rating
AnyDecentMusic?	8.0/10
Metacritic	81/100
Review scores
Source	Rating
Clash	8/10
DIY	4.5/5 stars
Financial Times	4/5 stars
The Guardian	4/5 stars
The Line of Best Fit	8/10
Loud and Quiet	9/10
NME	4/5 stars

According to the review aggregator Metacritic, Reason to Smile received "universal acclaim" based on a weighted average score of 81 out of 100 from 7 critic scores. "Payback" was included at number 9 on BBC Music's list of the best songs of the year.

=== Accolades ===
Reason to Smile awards
Year	Organisation	Award	Status	Ref.
2022	Mercury Prize	—N/a	Shortlisted	
2022	GRM Daily Rated Awards	Album of the Year	Nominated	
2022	MOBO Awards	Album of the Year	Nominated	

Reason to Smile year-end lists
Publication	#	Ref.
Clash	22	
Double J	22	
NME	35	
PopMatters	33	

== Track listing ==
All tracks are written by Kwadwo Adu Genfi Amponsah with others noted.

Reason to Smile track listing
No.	Title	Writer(s)	Producers	Length
1.	"Reason to Smile" (featuring Tiana Major9)	Cameron Palmer; Eight9FLY; Kwame "KZ" Kwei-Armah Jr.; Tiana Major9; Tyrell Paul	Cameron Palmer; KZ; Tyrell Paul 169; Venna	3:04
2.	"Together"	Palmer; Emmavie; KZ; Maverick Sabre; Mbongo; Äyanna	Palmer; KZ	3:04
3.	"Nappy"	KZ; Oliver Rodigan	Cadenza; KZ; Ric & Thadus; Palmer (Note: Additional producer)	2:16
4.	"Silk" (featuring Masego)	David Mrakpor; Masego; Namali Kwaten	Blue Lab Beats; Palmer	3:58
5.	"Pressure" (featuring Shaé Universe)	Palmer; Emil Larbi; O. Koleoso; Shaé Universe	Palmer; Larbi	3:54
6.	"Born" (featuring Cashh)	Cashh; KZ; Rayan El-Hussein Rayo Goufar	KZ; Palmer	3:27
7.	"Pusher Man: BWI"	Adrian Francis; Curtis Antony James; Larbi	Francis; Fanatix; Larbi; Palmer; KZ	4:51
8.	"Talkin" (featuring Kelis and Tiana Major9)	Palmer; Kelis; KZ; Tiana Major9	Palmer; KZ	2:57
9.	"War Outside" (featuring Lex Amor)	Palmer; KZ; Lex Amor	Palmer; KZ	3:57
10.	"Payback" (featuring Knucks)	Palmer; Knucks	Palmer	2:45
11.	"Fubu"	Jay Weathers; Karriem Riggins; KZ	Weathers; KZ; Remedee; Palmer	3:05
12.	"Beautiful" (featuring Wretch 32 and Shakka)	Ayodele Oyadare; Shakka; Wretch 32	Oyadare; Palmer; KZ	3:20
13.	"Anywhere" (featuring Ego Ella May)	Palmer; May; Owen Cutts	Palmer; Cutts; KZ	3:05
14.	"Solo" (featuring Rexx Life Raj)	Jazon Kawu-Eugenio; Rexx Life Raj	Jay Prince	4:00
15.	"Gangsta"	Ed Thomas; Weathers	Palmer; Thomas; Weathers; KZ	4:37
Total length:				52:20

== Personnel ==
=== Musicians ===
- Kojey Radical – vocals
- Cameron Palmer – synth bass (2, 5, 10), piano (5, 8), keyboards (10, 13), organ (8), synthesizer (8), Rhodes solo (8), guitar (10), Wurlitzer (11)
- Kwame "KZ" Kwei-Armah Jr. – additional vocals (1, 3, 6, 10), synthesizer (2, 13), piano (1), Rhodes solo (2), piano (7), bass (8), guitar (8), synth bass (9), whistling (9)
- Tiana Major9 – vocals (1, 8)
- Masego – vocals (4)
- Shaé Universe – vocals (5)
- Cashh – vocals (6)
- Kelis – vocals (8)
- Lex Amor – vocals (9)
- Knucks – vocals (10)
- Shakka – vocals (12)
- Wretch 32 – vocals (12), additional vocals (8)
- Ego Ella May – vocals (13), additional vocals (9)
- Rexx Life Raj – vocals (14)
- Ayanna Christie Brown – additional vocals (2, 10)
- Emmavie – additional vocals (2, 10)
- Michael Stafford – additional vocals (2, 10)
- Christina Matovu – additional vocals (4, 7, 12, 15)
- Mundu – additional vocals (4, 14)
- Bobii Lewis – additional vocals (6)
- Benjamin Totten – guitar (1, 11)
- David Mrakpor – guitar, keyboards, synth bass (4)
- Rashaan Brown – guitar (6)
- Greg Mathews – guitar (8)
- Femi Koleoso – drums (1, 5)
- Namali Kwaten – drums, percussion (4)
- Dayna Fisher – bass guitar (6, 7, 11, 15), trombone (1)
- Neil Waters – trumpet (1–4, 10, 15), flugelhorn (4, 5, 11)
- Trevor Mires – trombone (2–4, 6–8, 10, 13, 15), sousaphone (7, 10), bass trombone (13)
- Charlie Stock and Stella Page – viola (1, 2, 4, 6–8, 12, 13, 15)
- Ezme Gaze and Wayne Urquhart – cello (1, 2, 4, 6–8, 12, 13, 15)
- Antonia Pagulatos, Emma Blanco, Marsha Skins, and Sam Kennedy – violin (1, 2, 4, 6–8, 12, 13, 15)
- Nathan "Flutebox" Lee – flute (2)
- Mike Keys – keyboards (9), piano, synth bass (13)
- Ed Thomas – piano (15)

=== Technical ===
- Cameron Palmer – engineering (1, 2, 5, 7–10, 13, 15), drum programming (2, 5, 9, 10, 13)
- Kwame "KZ" Kwei-Armah Jr. – executive producer, engineering (1, 2, 6–9, 11–15), drum programming (6, 8, 9), vocal arrangements (13)
- Swindle – executive producer
- Stuart Hawkes – mastering engineer (1–9, 11–14)
- Joker – mixing engineer (1–8, 10–14)
- Neil Waters – string arrangements (1, 2, 4, 6–8, 12, 13, 15)
- Namali Kwaten – drum programming (4), sound design (4)
- Blue Lab Beats – engineering (4)
- Jay Weathers – drum programming (15)

== Charts ==
Chart performance for Reason to Smile
Chart (2022)	Peak position
UK Albums (Official Charts)	11
UK R&B Albums (Official Charts)	1
