= Blood diamond (disambiguation) =

A blood diamond is a diamond mined in a war zone and sold to finance military operations.

Blood diamond may also refer to:

- Blood Diamond, 2006 film about the blood diamond trade
- Blood Diamond (album), a 2024 album by Unknown T
- Blood Diamonds (documentary), 2006 TV documentary about the blood diamond trade
- "Blood Diamonds", an episode of theWalker, Texas Ranger
- Bloodpop, a musician, record producer, and songwriter previously called Blood Diamonds
