= Jai Amore =

UK RnB Singer who won MOBO Award for Best Unsigned Act 2006

Julian "Jai Amore" Amoah (born 14 July 1985) is an English singer-songwriter and record producer. In 2006 he won the MOBO Award for Best Unsigned Act, gaining recognition when he opened the stage with at the Awards Ceremony at The Royal Albert Hall. He went on to win the 2007 UK Unsigned Award for Best Performer and Best Singer Songwriter. In 2009 Jai Amore won the BBC Performing Arts Grant, and he began work as a vocal producer for a number of artists and producers in the UK and abroad. These included Zalon Thompson who is signed to Amy Winehouse's Lioness label, Heshima Thompson, Wiley, Bless Beats, Daniel "D-Boy" Naqvi, and an array of signed and unsigned acts in the UK. He featured on "Masseuse" as the lead vocalist alongside UK rapper Chipmunk and US rapper Joe Budden, which quickly gained radio and industry interest including top radio station's BBC Radio 1, KISS FM, and Radio 1Xtra.

== Early life ==
Jai Amore was born in Central Middlesex Hospital in London, to Ghanaian parents. At the Harlesden Methodist Church, where his father was the head organist and conductor of the church choir, Jai Amore learned to play the piano. He went on to study music at Cardinal Wiseman RC High School, gaining an A in Music GCSE, and going on to study Music Technology at Brunel University, where he trained in studio engineering and vocal production.

== Career ==
After performing at the 2006 MOBO Awards Ceremony, Jai Amore was invited to perform as opening act for US RnB singers Ginuwine and Montell Jordan during their live shows in the UK. He went on to perform at a number of high-profile events and venues across the UK, including Miss Black Britain Finals at Manchester United F.C.'s Old Trafford, KEMET Radio Nottingham launch, Choice FM Urban Weekender, ACFest University Weekender, and as a guest performance at the 2008 UK Unsigned Live Finals at the Hackney Empire. After winning the 2009 BBC Performing Arts Fund, he travelled for a year, to New York, where he performed at the Ashford & Simpson's Sugar Bar, and then to Texas. More recently, he spent some time in Ghana, where he met hiplife duet Bradez, and featured on the 2011 single "Conquer the World", while gaining national recognition through a number of live television interviews and public performances in Accra.
