= La Fève (rapper) =

French rapper

- Ambroise in 2024

Background information
- Born: Louis Ambroise; 26 June 1994 (age 32); Val-de-Marne, France
- Genres: Rap; trap; cloud rap
- Occupation: Rapper

Louis Ambroise (born 26 June 1999) is a French rapper.

== Life and career ==
Ambroise was born in Val-de-Marne on 26 June 1999. He began rapping with his friend Dundy, and released his short mixtapes on SoundCloud and YouTube. In 2021, he released the album ERRR, achieving certified platinum in France by SNEP.

Later in his career, Ambroise released the single Mauvais payeur, achieving certified diamond in France by SNEP. In November 2023, he released the single Royal, and in December 2023, he released the album 24. He collaborated with rappers such as Knucks, Tiakola and Zequin. In September 2024, he released the mixtape BIGLAF, and in November 2024, he appeared on the track Eolienne with La Fouine, on the mixtape Capitale du crime Radio. According to Les Inrockuptibles, he was named the "incarnation of rap culture" in 2026.
