= Blood Diamonds =

- Country of origin: United States-

Production
- Producer: Bill Brummel
- Running time: 100 minutes

Original release
- Network: History Channel
- Release: December 30, 2006

Blood Diamonds is a television documentary series, originally broadcast on the History Channel, that looks into the trade of diamonds which fund rebellions and wars in many African nations. The program focuses primarily on two nations: Sierra Leone and Angola. Diamonds which are traded for this purpose are known as blood diamonds. As with many History Channel specials, its original airdate coincides with a mainstream period film, in this case, Blood Diamond (2006). The producer of the documentary was Bill Brummel.

== Episode Synopsis ==
The episode follows typical documentary format, hopping from topic to topic between commercial breaks. The topics discussed are as follows:

- A brief history of Sierra Leone's civil war, and the group which funds this war through blood diamonds, the Revolutionary United Front (RUF)
- Interviews with victims of the blood diamond trade, most prominently civilian amputee victims
- A brief history of the De Beers Group, their connection to the trade, and their response to more recent public criticism
- The experience of one man, Usman Conteh, and the personal strife that the conflict brought him
- Interviews with civilians forced to work for the RUF, often forced to steal from, harass, and even kill their neighbors and, occasionally, their own family members
- Interviews with warlords involved with the conflict
- The United Nations' slow response to the atrocities
- The fall of the RUF

== See also ==
- Blood diamond (disambiguation)
