= Unknown T =

British-Ugandan rapper

- Born: Daniel Lena; 17 August 1999 (age 27); Homerton, London, England
- Genres: British hip hop; UK drill
- Occupations: Rapper; singer; songwriter
- Years active: 2017–present
- Labels: A Stay Solid Music; Island
- Member of: 98s

Daniel Lena (born 17 August 1999), known professionally as Unknown T, is an English-Ugandan rapper. His post release album Rise Above Hate (2020) was a major hit on the UK music scene, with the album reaching the top of the charts in its first couple of weeks.

== Career ==
His debut single, "Homerton B", peaked at number 48 on the UK Singles Chart in October 2018. Though it was originally released without a label, its chart performance led to him being signed by Island Records through Universal Music Group and appeared at Wireless festival in 2019. It was included in a number of publications "best of 2018" lists, including The Guardian, Mixmag, and Complex. In March 2019, "Homerton B" became the first UK drill track to be certified Silver by the BPI. Follow up tracks "Throwback", "Meat" and "Leave Dat Trap", the latter featuring AJ Tracey, have accumulated over 5 million views.

Unknown T's first mixtape Rise Above Hate was released on 17 July 2020 and peaked at 14 on the UK Albums Chart. On 7 January 2021, Unknown T released the single "WW2". On 10 June, the second single "Wonderland" featuring M Huncho was released. On 25 June, he released the third single "Goodums". On 15 July, he released the fourth single "Driller sh!t". On 30 July 2021, Unknown T released his second mixtape Adolescence, including guest appearances from Digga D, M1llionz, Potter Payper, and Nafe Smallz.

He jointly holds the record for most top 75 hits in the UK without having a top 40 hit with fellow British rapper Loski. Unknown T also made a cameo appearance as himself in the BBC series Boarders.

== Personal life ==
Lena is of Ugandan and Congolese descent. Lena is a supporter of Liverpool F.C.

== Legal issues ==
In 2017, aged 17, Lena was cleared of hiding a 4 mm revolver and ammunition under his bed after claiming the gun was foisted upon him by a stranger. More recently Lena was cleared of murdering Steve Narvaez-Jara, 20, at a house party near Old Street, Islington, London in the early hours of 1 January 2018. Speaking to the Guardian in 2018, Lena complained that the drill scene – long the subject of criticism in the media – was being unfairly attacked. "They don't understand the reality," he said. "It's not about the music, it's about what's behind the music. You can't blame the music, or say you're giving a helping hand with no aid. They're pointing the finger at us but forgetting there's three fingers pointing back."

== Discography ==
=== Studio albums ===
Title	Details	Peak chart positions	
Title	Details	UK	UK R&B/HH
Blood Diamond	Released: 12 January 2024; Label: Stay Solid Music, Island; Format: Digital download, streaming	61	2

=== Mixtapes ===
Title	Details	Peak chart positions			Certifications
Title	Details	UK	UK R&B/HH	IRE	Certifications
Rise Above Hate	Released: 17 July 2020; Label: Stay Solid Music, Island; Format: Digital download, streaming	14	3	74	BPI: Silver
Adolescence	Released: 30 July 2021; Label: Stay Solid Music, Island; Format: Digital download, streaming	8	3	88	
Listen.	Released: 11 September 2026; Label: Stay Solid Music, Island; Format: Digital download, streaming	—	—	—	

=== Extended plays ===
Title	Details
Before the Smoke	Released: 18 August 2023; Label: Stay Solid Music, Island; Format: Digital download, streaming

=== Compilation albums ===
Title	Details
Class of 98s (with 98s)	Released: 24 September 2020; Label: 98s; Format: Digital download

=== Singles ===
==== As lead artist ====
List of singles as a lead artist, showing year released, peak chart positions, certifications and album name
Title	Year	Peak chart positions		Certifications	Album
Title	Year	UK	UK R&B/HH	Certifications	Album
"Homerton B"	2018	48	27	BPI: Platinum	Non-album singles
"Throwback" (with Crazy Cousinz)	2019	63	38		Non-album singles
"Meat"	2019	—	—		Non-album singles
"Leave Dat Trap" (featuring AJ Tracey)	2019	53	32		Rise Above Hate
"Fresh Home"	2020	55	36		Rise Above Hate
"Squeeze & Buss"	2020	—	—		Rise Above Hate
"Daily Duppy" (featuring GRM Daily)	2020	—	—		Non-album single
"Deh Deh"	2020	80	—		Rise Above Hate
"Main Squeeze" (featuring Young T & Bugsey)	2020	99	—		Rise Above Hate
"WW2"	2021	42	23		Adolescence
"Wonderland" (featuring M Huncho)	2021	52	17		Adolescence
"Goodums"	2021	—	—	BPI: Silver	Adolescence
"Driller sh!t"	2021	—	—		Adolescence
"Double Tap" (with Abra Cadabra)	2021	64	21		Non-album singles
"Often"	2022	—	—		Non-album singles
"Just Landed (Freestyle pt. I)"	2022	—	—		Who said drill’s dead?
"Batty & Bench (Freestyle pt. II)"	2022	—	—		Who said drill’s dead?
"Right Hand" (with Knucks)	2023	70	—		Blood Diamond
"Free Slime / Sexy Girls" (with Lancey Foux)	2023	—	—		Before the Smoke
"Adolescence" (featuring Digga D)	2023	90	—		Blood Diamond
"Hocus Pocus" (Unknown T featuring Loyle Carner)	2024	—	—		Blood Diamond
"–" denotes a recording that did not chart or was not released in that territory.

==== As featured artist ====
List of singles as a featured artist, showing year released, and album name
Title	Year	Album
"9er Ting" (Kay-O featuring Unknown T)	2018	This Sh#ts Ments
"Medusa" (WSTRN featuring Unknown T)	2019	Non-album singles
"Dumpa" (Ill Blu featuring M24, Unknown T)	2020	Non-album singles
"Kate Winslet" (NSG featuring Unknown T)	2020	Non-album singles
"Jagged Edge" (TSB featuring M1llionz & Unknown T)	2021	Non-album singles
"Roberto C" (Young T & Bugsey featuring Unknown T)	2021	Truth Be Told
"Packs and Potions (Remix)" (Hazey featuring M1llionz, Digga D & Unknown T)	2022	Non-album single
"PRAYERS"(OBLADAET featuring Unknown T)	2023	Players Club 2
"UK Drill" (Booter Bee featuring Unknown T)	2025	True Stories 2

=== Guest appearances ===
List of non-single guest appearances, showing year released, other artist(s), and album name
Title	Year	Other artist(s)	Album
"Turn"	2019	RV, Headie One	Drillers x Trappers II
"Raise Hell"	2019	V9	Homerton Sensei
"Black & Proud"	2020	AJ Tracey	Reprise: A Roc Nation Album
"Excuse Me"	2020	SL	Different Dude
"Double Trouble"	2020	GRM Daily, D Double E	GRM 10
"Drip Drip"	2020	V9	Yūdokuna
"Under Surveillance"	2020	Frosty	Under Surveillance
"Ughh!"	2020	98s, Jimmy, Kay-O	Class of 98s
"98 Degrees"	2020	98s, Stally, DA, Hitman, V9, Mazza	Class of 98s
"Medicine"	2021	Deno	Boy Meets World
"Mon Cher"	2021	Gazo, Pa Salieu	Drill FR
"Eastender"	2021	Potter Payper	Thanks for Waiting
"Anger Problems"	2021	V9	Murk With A Mouth
"Tied Up"	2021	Kay-O	Fine Line
"Went Jail"	2022	Groundworks, Digga D	The G Tape: Volume 1
"Darjeeling"	2022	FKA twigs, Jorja Smith	Caprisongs
"Giddy Up"	2022	wewantwraiths	HeartBrokeChild
