= MOBO Awards 2015 =

2015 edition of award ceremony

- Awarded for: Excellence in music of black origin
- Date: 4 November 2015
- Location: First Direct Arena, Leeds, England
- Country: United Kingdom
- Hosted by: Sarah-Jane Crawford

Highlights
- Most wins: Stormzy and Krept and Konan (2 each)
- Most nominations: Jme and Krept and Konan (4 each)
- Album of the Year: Krept and Konan – The Long Way Home
- Website: mobo.com

Television/radio coverage
- Network: ITV2 (live coverage); ITV (deferred)

The MOBO Awards 2015 ceremony was held at First Direct Arena in Leeds on 4 November 2015 and hosted by Sarah-Jane Crawford, it was live streamed on ITV2, later deferred on ITV.

Nominees were announced on 30 September 2015, with Jme and hip hop group Krept and Konan leading the field with four nominations each. On the night, Stormzy and Krept and Konan were the top winners, each taking home two awards.

== Performers ==
The following artists performed at the ceremony, the full list was revealed the weeks following 20 August 2015.

List of performers at the MOBO Awards 2015
Artist(s)
Rita Ora
FKA twigs
Krept & Konan
Ella Eyre
Naughty Boy
Shakka
Section Boyz
Lianne La Havas
Lethal Bizzle
Fuse ODG
CeeLo Green

== Winners and nominees ==
Winners appear first and highlighted in bold.

**Best Album**: **The Long Way Home – Krept & Konan**; Integrity – Jme; Blood – Lianne La Havas; Snakes & Ladders – Wiley; In Colour – Jamie xx	**Best Song**: **"Shutdown" – Skepta**; "Uptown Funk" – Mark Ronson featuring Bruno Mars; "Not Letting Go" – Tinie Tempah featuring Jess Glynne; "Man Don't Care" – Jme featuring Giggs; "Freak of the Week" – Krept & Konan
**Best Newcomer**: **Section Boyz**; Bugzy Malone; NAO; Bonkaz; Nick Brewer; George the Poet; J Hus; Shakehips; Sinéad Harnett; Yungen	**Best Video**: **"Pendulum" – FKA Twigs (Director: FKA Twigs)**; "Know Me From" – Stormzy; "Body on Me" – Rita Ora featuring Chris Brown; "Fester Skank" – Lethal Bizzle; "Glass & Patron" – FKA Twigs
**Best Female**: **Ella Eyre**; FKA Twigs; Little Simz; Lianne La Havas; Jess Glynne	**Best Male**: **Stormzy**; Skepta; Mark Ronson; Krept & Konan; Jme
**Best Grime Act**: **Stormzy**; Bugzy Malone; Jme; Lethal Bizzle; Skepta	**Best R&B/Soul Act**: **Shakka**; Kwabs; Andreya Triana; Lianne La Havas; Joss Stone
**Best Hip Hop Act**: **Krept & Konan**; Akala; Nines; Little Simz; Lady Leshurr	**Best International Album**: **If You're Reading This It's Too Late – Drake**; 2014 Forest Hills Drive – J. Cole; To Pimp a Butterfly – Kendrick Lamar; Compton: A Soundtrack by Dr. Dre – Dr. Dre; Beauty Behind the Madness – The Weeknd; Black Messiah – D'Angelo; Reality Show – Jazmine Sullivan; Ego Death – The Internet; Black Rose – Tyrese; At.Long.Last.ASAP – ASAP Rocky
**Best Gospel Act**: **Faith Child**; Chos3n; Olaedo Ibe; Leroy Johnson; Ni-cola	**Best Jazz Act**: **Binker and Moses**; Julia Biel; Courtney Pine; David Lyttle; Polar Bear
**Best African Act**: **Fuse ODG**; Davido; Wizkid; Patoranking; Moelo; Yemi Alade; AKA; Mista Silva; Shatta Wale; Silvastone	**Best Reggae Act**: **Popcaan**; Stylo G; Chronixx; Omi; Protoje
**MOBO Inspiration Award** **Idris Elba**	**Outstanding Contribution to Music** **CeeLo Green**
