= Sarah-Jane Crawford =

English television and radio presenter, actress

- Born: Lambeth, London, England
- Education: Anglia Ruskin University
- Occupations: TV presenter, radio presenter, actress
- Years active: 2007–present

Sarah-Jane Crawford is an English television and radio presenter, actress, voice-over artist, and DJ best known for her radio work with Hits Radio and formerly with BBC Radio 1Xtra, and television work with E! Network (which she is currently a host for), ITV2 on The Xtra Factor, BBC and Channel 4. Crawford has also presented and appeared a number of shows for the Disney Channel and MTV.

== Early life ==
Born in Lambeth to parents of Irish and Caribbean descent, she was adopted at two months old. She attended schools at Bessemer Grange, Dulwich Hamlet and Sydenham Girls' School before moving to Cambridgeshire for her remaining years of secondary school. Before becoming a television presenter, Crawford attended both Kingston University and Anglia Ruskin University, graduating with a 2:1 degree in Marketing.

== Career ==
=== Television ===
Crawford began her TV career on Shipwrecked 3 on Channel 4, but began presenting in 2007 when she hosted the Red Carpet and Back Stage show of the Vodafone Live Music Awards for The Hits music video channel, now known as 4music.

In 2007, Crawford joined the presenter line-up for the E4 Music Zone and Freshly Squeezed for Channel 4 and as a result she has interviewed the likes of Robert De Niro, Natasha Bedingfield, Colin Farrell, Kate Hudson, Ewan McGregor, Jerry Seinfeld and Sarah Jessica Parker for Channel 4.

In October 2009, Crawford officially launched the UK MTV channel VIVA, the first channel from MTV. In August 2010, Crawford began hosting a weekly show on MTV HD's channel called The Music Alphabet. In September 2010, Crawford appeared with Jonathan Ross and Ant and Dec, on a Nintendo TV advertisement celebrating 25 years of Mario.

In July 2013, she co-hosted the BBC Three coverage of T in the Park festival with Greg James. In August 2013 Crawford co-hosted BBC Three's first Urban Classic Prom at the Royal Albert Hall with Charlie Sloth. In October 2013, she co-hosted the Mobo Awards with Trevor Nelson which aired on BBC One and BBC Three.

On 30 August 2014, Crawford replaced Caroline Flack and Matt Richardson as the presenter of The X Factor's ITV2 spin-off show The Xtra Factor.

In October 2014 Crawford hosted the MOBO awards with Spice Girl Mel B on ITV2.

In February 2015 Crawford began presenting duties for E! Network by hosting the BAFTA red carpet show. In June 2015, Crawford launched a show to help E! find a new UK and Ireland online host.

In November 2015, she hosted the Mobo Awards for the third time at the First Direct Arena in Leeds. In December 2016 - January 2017, Crawford co-hosted World's Strongest Man for Channel 5. Crawford co-hosted her second series of World's Strongest Man in 2017 due to air on Channel 5 during December to January 2018. Crawford took part in series 3 of Celebs Go Dating which aired on E4 in September 2017.

On 19 May 2018, Crawford was a co-presenter of E!’s royal wedding coverage of Prince Harry and Meghan Markle's wedding live from Windsor Castle alongside Giuliana Rancic, Melanie Bromley and Brad Goreski.

=== Radio ===
In October 2008, Crawford began presenting on ad hoc shows as a cover DJ on BBC Radio 1Xtra. In April 2009, she began hosting her own show which was the early weekend breakfast slot from 7.00 am on BBC Radio 1Xtra In 2011, Crawford began hosting the Saturday and Sunday slot from 1.00 pm to 4.00 pm, upon which she launched BBC Radio 1Xtra's first Book Club. From 2 April 2012, she started to present the weekday afternoon slot on BBC Radio 1Xtra.

Crawford has since covered for Gemma Cairney who currently presents the Surgery and on 12 August 2015 hosted a A-level results advisory show. In 2015 Crawford has also covered on BBC Radio 1, Saturday and Sundays from 1 pm to 4 pm On 1 October 2015, Crawford hosted her last show for BBC Radio 1Xtra after an announcement by her earlier the previous month that she was leaving to work on TV projects in Los Angeles.

Crawford joined Bauer media's new national station Hits Radio in June 2018 to present weeknights 7–10pm, she also presented The Hits Radio Top 40 Sunday's 4–7pm which later became known as The UK Chart Show. As of Monday 24 June 2019, Crawford took over the 1–4pm afternoon slot on the station in addition to presenting the chart. She was replaced on evenings by Jordan Lee. Crawford now presents 4–7pm every weekend, and occasionally stands in for regular presenters.

=== Modelling ===
Crawford appeared in the April 2008 issue of FHM and in the November 2008 issue of British Vogue as part of a photo shoot and article called "Top of the Box" with Lauren Laverne and Fiona Bruce.

She appeared on the cover of Pride magazine in 2014. In June 2015 Crawford became the face of Brazilian flip flop brand Ipanema for a summer campaign. In September 2015 Crawford signed to Select Model Management to their celebrity division.

=== Films ===
In 2013 Crawford appeared in the British film It's A Lot which had its UK Cinema release in October 2013, playing the part of single mother Lorna. Crawford also appeared in the film The Hatton Garden Job playing the part of DCI Emma Carter alongside Matthew Goode, Joely Richardson and Larry Lamb. The film was released in April 2017.

=== Personal life ===
Crawford is married to the Irish football manager Brian Barry-Murphy.

She has been a vegan since 2015 and released a vegan app called Viappi in November 2017.

== See also ==
- List of vegans
