= Kojey Radical =

British musician (born 1993)

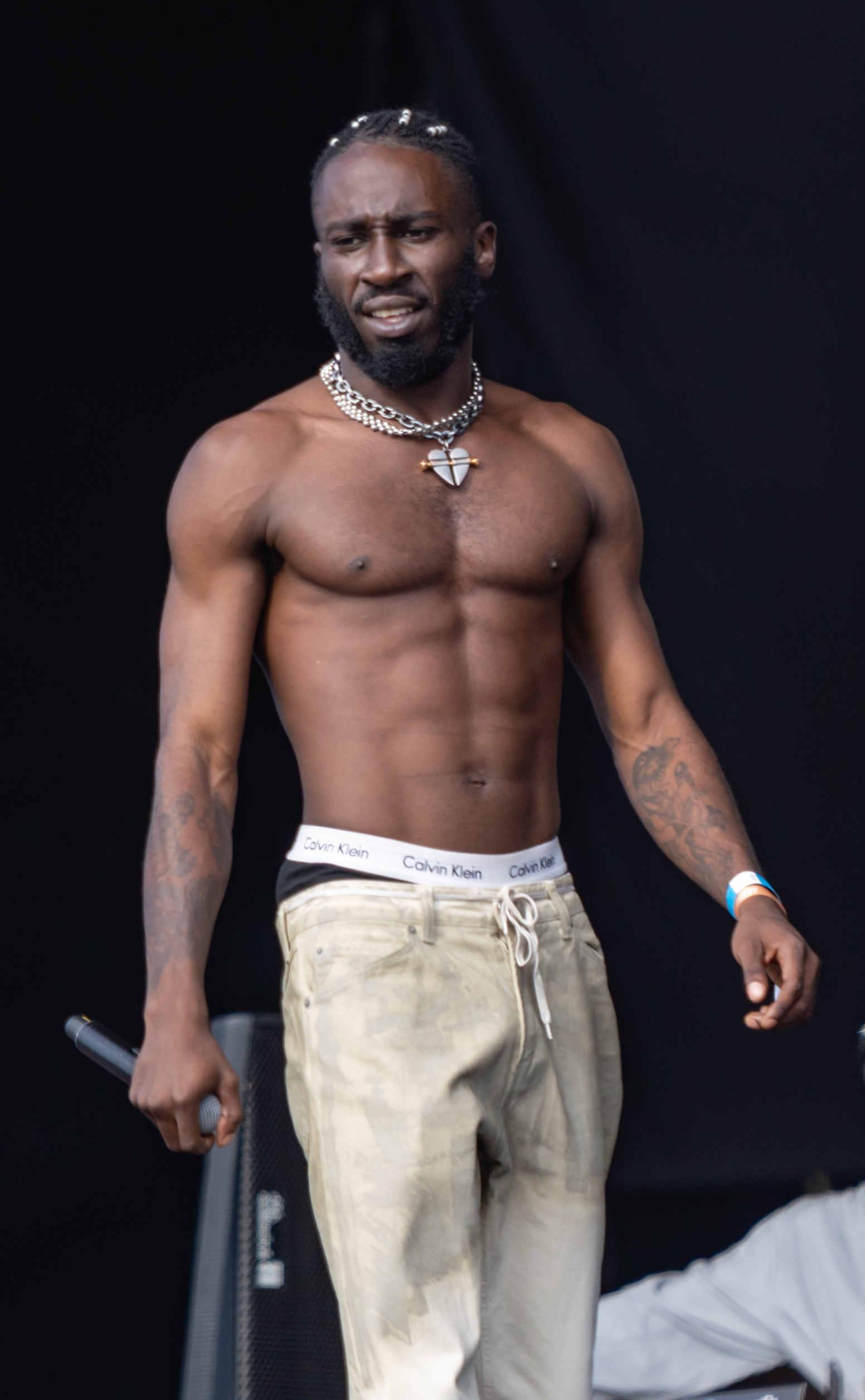
- Kojey Radical for Hypebeast

Background information
- Born: Kwadwo Adu Genfi Amponsah; 4 January 1993 (age 33); London, England
- Origin: Hoxton, London
- Genres: British hop-hop; progressive rap
- Occupations: Musician; rapper; poet
- Website: http://kojeyradical.online/

Kwadwo Adu Genfi Amponsah (born 4 January 1993), known professionally as Kojey Radical, is a British musician, creative director and mixed media visual artist. His style has been described as a mix of grime hip-hop, alternative rap, and spoken word. Since 2018, he has received six nominations at the MOBO Awards, including Best Newcomer. He also performed at the 2020 and 2022 MOBO ceremonies. His debut album, Reason to Smile, was released in 2022.

== Early life ==
Radical was raised in Shoreditch and Hoxton, London, the son of Ghanaian immigrants. He has a sister. He began his artistic work as a spoken word poet and mixed media illustrator, graduating from the London College of Fashion with a First Class Honours Bachelor of Arts degree in Fashion Illustration.

== Career ==
=== 2014–2016: Career beginnings ===
In 2014, Radical released his first musical project Dear Daisy: Opium just after graduating. The project touches on topics of love, social media, and religion. It was inspired by a book with the same name that Radical was illustrating during his time at university. Radical then started collaborating with UK artist and record producer Jay Prince, who produced Radical's first official record, The Garden Party. Radical followed up with a song called "Bambu", which subsequently became the first single on his sophomore EP, 23Winters. "Bambu" made use of blackface, and was a persona Radical would later adopt in majority of his early visuals.

After supporting Young Fathers on tour, Radical later released "Open Hand", a record that saw him adopt a more political stance in his music, premiering the visual at Tate Britain in 2015. Radical claimed to offer an alternative outlook on socio-political issues. He followed up with a record called "Kwame Nkrumah", before releasing his 23Winters EP in February 2016. "Kwame Nkrumah" was written in honour of the first Ghanaian president and Ghana's independence.

The 23Winters EP is about the relationship between a father and son, with themes of religion, society, family, love, new-age revolution, and African diaspora narrated by Radical's father. The project includes production from KZ The Producer, Fwdslxsh, Lupus Cain, Mike Keyz, Selvsse, Niels Kirk, and New Machine as well as collaborations with Tom Grennan, Ray Blk, and Bobii Lewis. It has been described as "a supreme phonic proclamation of one’s ethnicity, history, and future." In an interview with The Source, Radical stated his intention was to "create a body of work that voices [his] ideas and philosophies while also offering another sense of perspective." 23Winters also saw Radical nominated for two MOBO Awards, one for Best Newcomer and one for Best Video. The project debuted in the top three of the UK Rap & Hip Hop Albums Chart and also entered the UK top 40.

=== 2017–2021: In Gods Body and Cashmere Tears ===
In 2017, Radical returned with his third EP, In Gods Body. It includes features from Shola Ama, Ghetts, Tamera Foster, Miloh Smith, dance music producer Potè, Obongjayar, and actress and screenwriter Michaela Coel. Coel recites a poem written by Radical that serves as a central narration to the project. Radical also had a feature on the Poppy Ajudha single "Spilling Into You".

Media commentators saw the project as a continuation of 23Winters, honing in on some of the messages recited by Radical's father developing into a journey of self-discovery. It deconstructs the politics of black identity and race while introducing conversations about sexuality and love. Since the release of 23Winters, Radical has toured in Australia, New Zealand, Brazil, South Africa, Russia, and Europe. Radical has a brand relationship with Adidas which began in 2017. In 2018, Radical collaborated with Mahalia on her single "Water", which was featured on the soundtrack for the video game FIFA 19. This was followed up with another collaboration on her single "One Night Only." The track featured on Mahalia's EP, Seasons. During the same period, Radical and MJ Cole collaborated on the track "Soak It Up". Radical and Adidas collaborated to create a short film about mental health and depression alongside director Max Luz and fashion retailer SSENSE.

In 2019, Radical created bottle designs for the liquor brand 1800 Tequila. In late 2019, Radical released his fourth EP, Cashmere Tears. In a review by NME, it received five out of five stars and was described as a "tale of deeply emotional tales of everyday life". In January 2020, Radical collaborated with American musician Mereba on his single "Same Boat".

Radical was a nominee at the MOBO Awards in 2020 in the Best Video category. He was one of the headliners at the ceremony in December 2020. He released the single "Good" in late 2020, which was part of a wider collaboration with Sony with their 360 Reality Audio mixing.

=== 2022–present: Reason to Smile and Don't Look Down ===
Radical released his debut album Reason to Smile in March 2022. The album was shortlisted for a Mercury Prize and included in both the Album and Video of the Year categories at the 2022 MOBO Awards, with Radical being nominated for Best Hip Hop Act. In 2023, Radical was nominated for Best New Artist at the 2023 Brit Awards and at the Ivor Novello Awards for Best Contemporary Song for "Payback".

On 30 May 2025, Radical released "Rule One" with Bawo, marking his first single in three years. This was followed by "Conversation" on 10 June, along with the announcement of his second studio album, Don't Look Down, which was released 19 September.

== Other media ==
in January 2024, Radical took part in the New Year's Treat special of Taskmaster, finishing in third place.

== Discography ==
=== Studio albums ===
- Reason to Smile (2022)
- Don't Look Down (2025)

=== Extended plays ===
- Dear Daisy: Opium (2014)
- 23Winters (2016)
- In Gods Body (2017)
- Cashmere Tears (2019)

== Awards and nominations ==
Organisation	Year	Category	Nominee	Result	Ref.
Brit Awards	2023	Best New Artist	Kojey Radical	Nominated	
Ivor Novello Awards	2019	Best Contemporary Song	"Black Rose"	Nominated	
Ivor Novello Awards	2023	Best Contemporary Song	"Payback"	Nominated	
Mercury Prize	2022	Album Of The Year	Reason to Smile	Nominated	
MOBO Awards	2018	Best Newcomer	Kojey Radical	Nominated	
MOBO Awards	2018	Best Video	Kojey Radical	Nominated	
MOBO Awards	2020	Best Video	"20/20"	Nominated	
MOBO Awards	2022	Album of the Year	Reason to Smile	Nominated	
MOBO Awards	2022	Video of the Year	"Payback"	Nominated	
MOBO Awards	2022	Best Hip Hop Act	Kojey Radical	Nominated	
Rated Awards	2022	Album of the Year	Reason to Smile	Nominated	
Visionary Arts Awards	2023	Song of the Year	"FUBU"	Won	
Berlin Music Video Awards	2023	Best Art Director	Payback	Nominated	

Besides industry awards, Radical also received an honorary degree from the University of the Arts London in July 2024.
