= 98s =

British hip hop collective

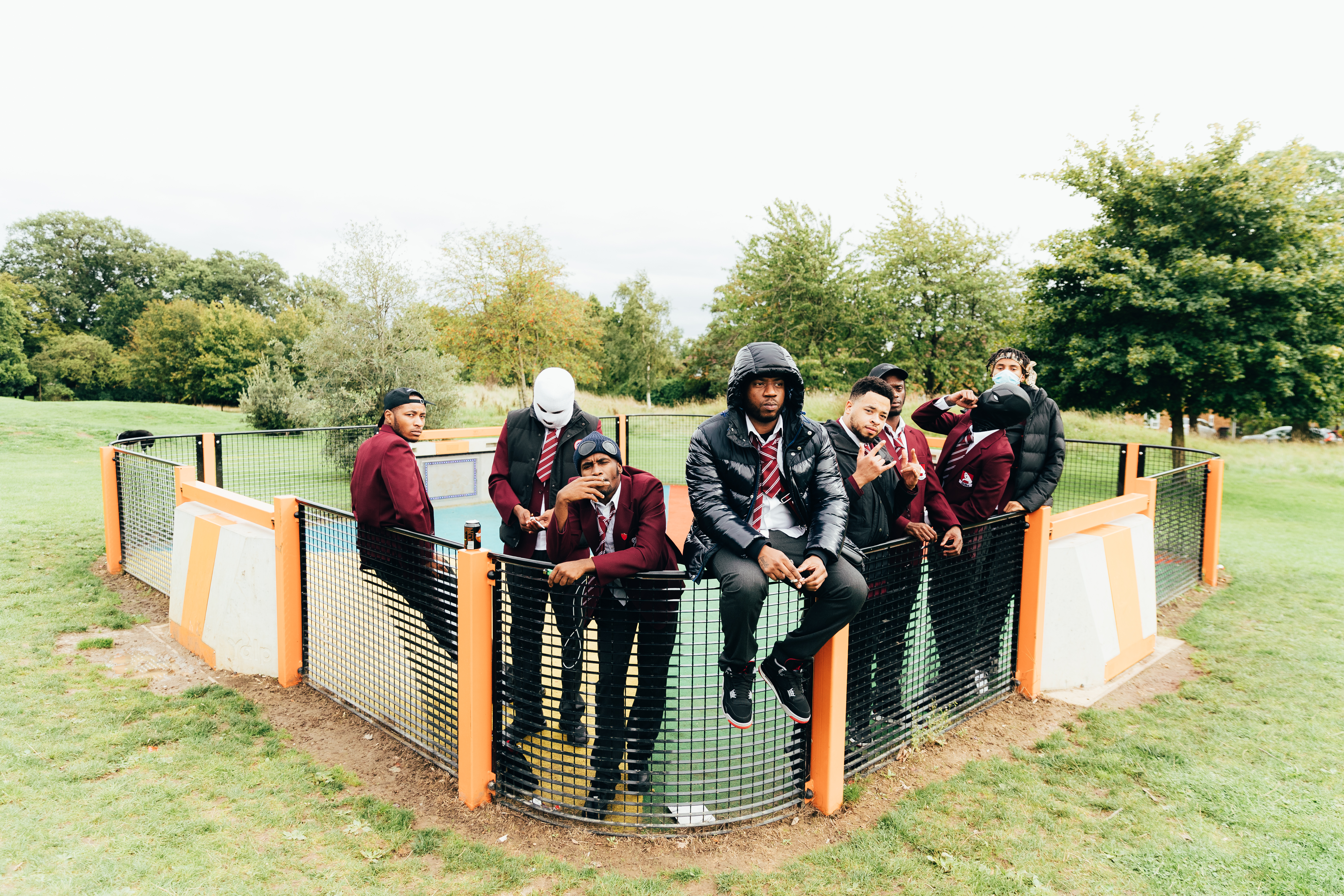
- Class Of 98s

Background information
- Origin: Hackney, London, England
- Genres: British hip hop; UK drill
- Years active: 2020–present
- Labels: 98s, Groundworks
- Members: See list

98s is an English hip-hop collective based in Hackney, London. The group is named after the two postcodes, E9 (Homerton) and E8 (Holly street ), where the members are from. Their members include V9, Unknown T, Kay-O (formerly KO), HitMan, DA, DLA, Jimmy, Stally, Alchubbino, Billy Billions, and Mazza. They released their debut album, Class of 98s, on 24 September 2020.

== History ==
98s is a collective of friends from Homerton and Holly Street in Hackney, London. On 4 November 2019, the group appeared on Tim Westwood's Crib Session for a cipher on his show.

Individual members such as V9, Unknown T, and KO (now known as Kay-O) had success as solo artists before the collective formed in 2020, with the mixtapes Yūdokuna, Rise Above Hate, and Drilliam Shakespeare. On 6 August 2020, the 98s made their debut as a group with the single "Homerton2Holly". Their second and third singles, "Taco" and "Pay Attention," were released on 27 August and 10 September. On 24 September 2020, they released their debut album, Class of 98s. On 12 February 2021, they released the single "WeDa1s".

On 13 December 2023 Kay-O (real name Kammar Henry-Richards), HitMan (real name Jeffrey Gyimah), Ka'mani Brightly-Donaldson and Joao Pateco-Te were found guilty of murder. The killing happened on 13 August 2022 in Walthamstow. On 14 January 2025, they were sentenced to a minimum 37 years, 35 years, 38 years and 37 years respectively.

== Members ==
—

The list below includes confirmed members of 98s.

- Alchubbino
- Billy Billions
- DA
- Y.DA
- DLA
- Dicey
- Y.DLA
- HitMan
- Jimmy
- Kay-O (formerly KO)
- Mazza
- PM
- Smokes
- Stally
- Unknown T
- V9

== Discography ==
=== Studio albums ===
| Title | Details |
|---|---|
| Class of 98s | Released: 24 September 2020; Label: 98s; Format: Digital download |

=== Singles ===
| Title | Year | Album |
|---|---|---|
| "Homerton2Holly" (with Jimmy, Stally, DA, Hitman, Mazza, Kay-O & Billy Billions) | 2020 | Class of 98s |
| "Taco" (with V9, Billy Billions, AlChubbino, Jimmy & Stally) | 2020 | Class of 98s |
| "Pay Attention" (with Stally, Jimmy, V9, DA & Kay-O) | 2020 | Class of 98s |
| "Family" (with V9, Alchubbino, Jimmy & Billy Billions) | 2020 | Class of 98s |
| "Wait a Minute" (with Billy Billions, AlChubbino & Kay-O) | 2020 | Class of 98s |
| "Plugged In" (with Fumez the Engineer, Stally, Mazza, Billy Billions & DA) | 2020 | Non-album single |
| "WeDa1s" (with Kay-O, AlChubbino, Jimmy, Stally, Billy Billions, Hitman, DA & Mazza) | 2021 | TBA |

=== Individual discography ===
| Artist | Title | Details |
|---|---|---|
| Kay-O | This Sh#ts Ments | Released: 26 October 2018; Label: TSM Records; Format: Digital download |
| V9 | Homerton Sensei | Released: 20 May 2019; Label: Double S Records; Format: Digital download |
| Kay-O | Drilliam Shakespeare | Released: 1 November 2019; Label: TSM Records; Format: Digital download |
| V9 | Yūdokuna | Released: 29 May 2020; Label: Venomous; Format: Digital download |
| Unknown T | Rise Above Hate | Released: 17 July 2020; Label: A Stay Solid Music, Island; Format: Digital download, streaming |
| Unknown T | Adolescence | Released: 30 July 2021; Label: A Stay Solid Music, Island; Format: Digital download, streaming |
| V9 | Murk With A Mouth | Released: 22 November 2021; Label: GRM Daily Lmt, V9; Format: Digital download |
| Kay-O | Fine Line | Released: 26 November 2021; Label: TSM Records; Format: Digital download |
| Billy Billions | Me vs Me | Released: 10 March 2022; Label: TallyVision; Format: Digital download |
