= Victor Ray =

British pop musician

- Born: Kampala, Uganda
- Genres: Soul, R&B, Pop
- Occupations: Singer, songwriter
- Years active: 2017–present
- Labels: Decca Records (UK), Capitol Records (US)
- Website: victorrayofficial.com

Victor Ray is a British–Ugandan singer and songwriter. He grew to fame with his 2024 viral single "Comfortable", as well as "Stay for a While" and "It Only Cost Everything". Ray's music blends soulful R&B and pop influences with a vocal style described by critics as powerful yet vulnerable. After initially building a following through busking and social media, Ray signed to Decca Records in 2024.

== Early life ==
Victor Ray was born in Kampala, Uganda, and moved with his family to Newcastle, England when he was one year old. Ray developed an early love for music, with one of his first musical memories being dancing to ABBA's "Dancing Queen" as a child. At the age of six, he gave his first public performance at a school Christmas concert, singing a solo that sparked his passion for performing.

Ray grew up listening to a wide range of genres, including pop, soul, R&B, hip-hop, and rock, and was particularly influenced by artists like J. Cole and Usher. As a teenager, he learned guitar and began performing sets at local pubs, weddings and open-mic nights, covering songs ranging from Whitney Houston ballads to pop-rock songs by bands like Wheatus.

== Musical style and influences ==
Ray has described his music as rooted in personal, autobiographical storytelling, drawing on elements of soul, R&B, and contemporary pop. He has referenced artists such as Ed Sheeran, Donny Hathaway, Michael Jackson and Usher as important influences on his songwriting and vocal style.

Ray has spoken about his aim to broaden representation of black British artists in mainstream pop beyond the focus on rap or grime, a stance noted by commentators who see him as "breaking down barriers" in the industry.

== Career ==
After finishing his education in Newcastle, Ray initially planned to attend university. Missing the grades required for his chosen course in sociology, he instead focused more on music, busking on the streets. His mother encouraged him to pursue music seriously, leading him to enrol at the British and Irish Modern Music Institute in London.

In late 2021, a video of Ray performing a cover of Hozier's "Take Me to Church", recorded on the street, went viral on TikTok, boosting his online profile and fan base. In early 2023, Ray independently released his debut EP i was.. He followed up in September 2023 with a second EP, i felt., which included the single "Popcorn and a Smoothie," a track about his father.

Ray's rising popularity and viral success caught the attention of major labels, with Decca Records announcing that they had signed him in January 2024. His first release on Decca was the single "Comfortable", which gained millions of streams after being teased on social media, peaking at number 62 on the UK Official Singles Chart.

In June 2024, Ray released his third EP, I TRIED.., which continued his confessional songwriting style. The EP featured "Comfortable" as its lead track and included a duet, "Falling Into Place," recorded with singer Debbie.

In 2025, Ray followed up with I WILL., released via Decca/Capitol. The EP was led by the single "Hearts Break and People Change" and the hip-hop-infused track "Sticks & Stones", featuring British rappers Kojey Radical and Strandz. Ray stated that he was working towards his first full-length album, expected in 2026.

In November 2025, Ray had his first UK Top 40 single with the release of "You & I", reaching a peak of number 29 on the UK Official Singles Chart.

== Discography ==
=== Compilation albums ===
- I AM. MIXTAPE (2026)

=== EPs ===
- i was. (2023)
- i felt. (2023)
- I TRIED. (2024)
- I WILL. (2025)

=== Singles ===
- "Hollow" (2022)
- "A Little Less Lonely" (2022)
- "Like The Moon" (2023)
- "Off Balance" (2023)
- "It Only Cost Everything" (2023)
- "Stay for a While" (2023)
- "Popcorn and a Smoothie" (2023)
- "Comfortable" (2024)
- "Halfway There" (2024)
- "Falling into Place" ft. Debbie (2024)
- "Still The Same" (2024)
- "Sticks & Stones" (2024)
- "Hearts Break and People Change" (2025)
- "World At My Feet" (2025)
- "Contagious" (2025)
- "You & I" (2025)
