= Rachel Kerr =

- Born: Rachel Charmaine Kerr; Walsall, West Midlands, England
- Genres: R&B, soul, pop, blues, gospel, jazz
- Occupations: Singer, songwriter, entrepreneur
- Instrument: Vocals
- Years active: 2012–present
- Label: Independent
- Website: www.rachelkerrmusic.com

Rachel Charmaine Kerr is a British singer/songwriter, celebrity vocal coach and entrepreneur from Walsall, England. She is also the CEO and founder of Singercise. She is a member of the Grammy Award Association and a BET Music Matters endorsed artist.

Her debut EP release Back To Music, was released in 2012 and went on to win the singer her first MOBO Music Award and a 2012 Urban Music Award nomination. Kerr has toured the US, UK and Africa opening for Lauryn Hill, Brandy, Musiq Soulchild, K. Michelle, Kirk Franklin and Fred Hammond. Kerr made history as the first British female artist to win a MOBO Award in her category as well as the first British Female artist to release a free-mixtape in 2016 titled Unboxed.

== Early life and education ==
Kerr was born in Walsall, United Kingdom on 30 May and is the eldest of two. She grew up in the West Midlands, UK with her family and began singing at a young age at Chuckery Road Pentecostal Church in Walsall. She is the daughter of renowned gospel singer/songwriter, Dalton Kerr who is the founder of mass gospel choirs such as Re:mission and Choir Light. Her mother was the lead vocalist of the gospel group 'One Accord' – a band composed of Rachel's mother and aunties. Rachel was singing lead in her church choir from five years old and began songwriting aged nine.

Kerr attended St Margaret's Church of England Infant School where she began her classical training in violin (a discipline she continued until 18 years old). Kerr also began taking dance lessons from the age of 6 (a discipline she continued into her 20s).

Kerr attended Performing Art's Academy Blue Coat Comprehensive School where she began studying for her GCSEs. It was during her studies there that she appeared on popular ITV talent competition Stars In Their Eyes as her "musical icon", the late R&B songstress Aaliyah, becoming the youngest contestant at the time to appear on the show.

Kerr holds a BA in Law and Sociology from the University of Warwick. During her time at University she was elected the President of the African and Caribbean Society and well as Faculty Student Ambassador.

Kerr moved to London after her University graduation at the age of 21.

== Career ==
=== Music ===
During her GCSE studies when she was 15, Kerr appeared as the youngest contestant at the time on ITV's popular talent contest Stars in Their Eyes where she impersonated her musical icon the late R&B congress Aaliyah Houghton.

Kerr earned her first international songwriting credits in 2008 whilst studying at the University of Warwick, where she began working with the Ministry of Sound, writing and featuring on their 'Ultimate Garage' 2008 compilation album.

She moved to London in a bid to further her legal career in 2010 but signed to Elegance Management.

In 2010, Kerr was invited to tour as an opening act for Gospel singers, Kirk Franklin, Fred Hammond and Marvin Sapp. Soon after she shared the same stage as CeeCee & BeBe Winans at Wembley Arena in front of 20,000 people in one of the UK's largest music festivals, Oraclez.

Shortly after she was invited to Denmark to write with Jonas Jeberg and Cutfather as well as tour the Caribbean where she visited Martinique, Barbados, Guadeloupe and St Lucia performing her original songs to crowds of up to 50,000 people. Upon her return to the UK she was nominated for her first MOBO nomination. She was also nominated for an Urban Music Award in the same year. Kerr made history as the first artist to be nominated for a MOBO Award with no officially released music. In the same year of her first MOBO Award nomination the singer was invited to 10 Downing Street to meet Former UK Prime Minister David Cameron where she was commended for her contributions to British Music.

In 2012, Kerr released her first EP titled Back to Music. Mastered in Abbey Road Studios by Master Engineer Geoff Pesche (credits also include Kylie Minogue, Coldplay) the EP went on to win a MOBO Award in 2012 and Urban Music Award nomination. This win made Kerr the first ever female solo artist to win in her category. The most notable hit from the EP was a song penned by Kerr titled 'Hold My Hand'.

For the launch of her EP, Kerr sold out London's Bush Hall.

In the same year as her MOBO Award win Kerr was invited to sing for former US President Bill Clinton at an annual fundraising event for the Clinton Foundation. Here the singer met and was personally commended by the Former US president. As well as the former president celebrity attendees included Lily Cole, Princess Beatrice, Gwyneth Paltrow and Will.i.am amongst others.

In 2013, Kerr was released her second EP release Getting Started. Her lead single from the release was again written by Kerr and was titled "I Will Love Me". Shortly after its release Kerr was picked up by BET Music Matters as a BET approved feature artist and commenced with a US Tour where she shared the stage with K. Michelle and Sevyn Streeter. It was during this tour that she performed at music venues in Los Angeles and New York headlining at House of Blues and SOB's respectively.

When back in London, she received an invitation to open up at the Indigo O2 Arena for her long time R&B music inspiration, Brandy.

In 2014, Kerr released a Christmas album where she re-wrote seven popular Christmas carols. The release was a free download gift to her supports and receiving over 50,000 downloads in the first month of its release.

In late 2015, Kerr released "All For You" a self penned song with influences from old school soul singers such as Sam Cooke. Shortly after her release Kerr was invited to sing with another one of her music inspirations Lauryn Hill in Africa.

In September 2016, Kerr released a free 16 track mixtape. The mixtape is called Unboxed, The mixtape enjoyed commercial radio rotation from the UK radio station Capital XTRA, and well as international attention.

=== Voice ===
Kerr's voice has over time been likened and compared to that of Beyonce which she has once responded in an interview as flattering. Kerr possesses a lyric soprano voice. Her singing style ranges from Contemporary R&B to Gospel, Blues, Soul, Jazz and Pop music.

=== Singercise ===
In 2012 Kerr, founded a Performing Arts Academy called Singercise. The academy has bases in both London and Africa. And to date has provided vocal coaching to key international talent platforms such as X Factor and The Voice. The academy has also provided vocal training for international celebrities such as Tiwa Savage, P-Square, Waje and UK girl group Neon Jungle. The academy has also been entrusted by major UK labels such as Sony RCA to train and coach some of their new talent.

== Discography ==
=== Studio EPs ===
- Back To Music (January 2012)
- Getting Started (September 2013)
- A Christmas Gift (December 2014)
- Unboxed (September 2016)

=== Singles ===
- "Hold My Hand" (2012)
- "I Will Love Me" (2013)
- "All For You" (2015)

== Awards and recognition ==
- She won a Music of Black Origin (MOBO) award for Best Gospel Artist
- In 2012 she was nominated for an Urban Music Award
- She was invited to sing before President Bill Clinton.
- In 2016 she won a UK Entertainment Award
