= Ego Ella May =

British-Nigerian musician (born 1992)

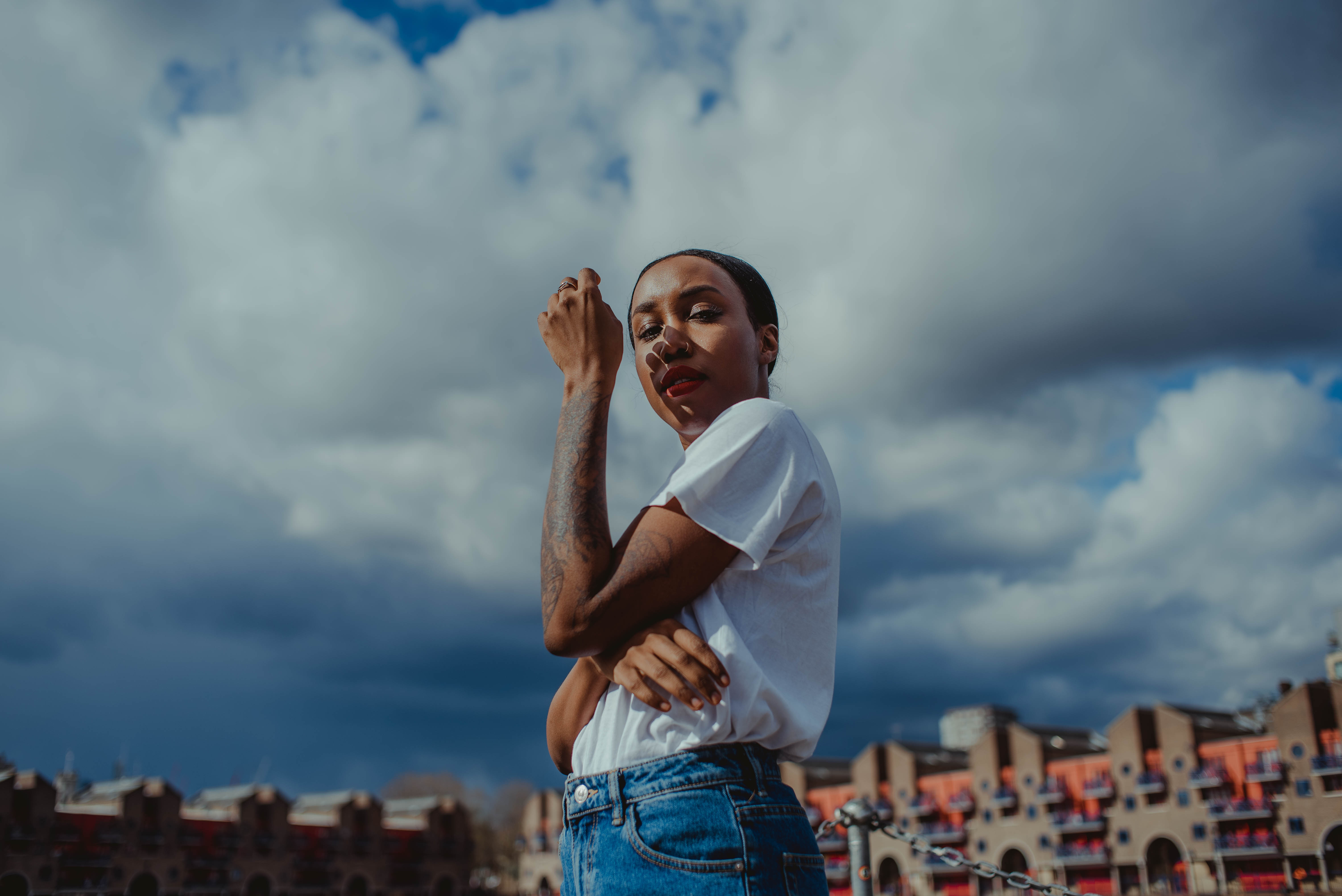

Background information
- Born: 1992 (age 33–34); Croydon, London
- Origin: South London, England
- Genres: Jazz
- Instruments: Vocals, guitar
- Years active: 2014–present
- Label: Upper Room Records

Ego Ella May (/ɛg-oʊ ˈɛl.ə meɪ/ eh-go eh-luh may; born Ego Ella Uche, 1992) is an R&B, neo-soul, and contemporary jazz musician from South London, England.

== Early life ==
Ella May was born in Croydon. She was named for her Nigerian heritage and after Ella Fitzgerald. She started singing in her late teens. At age 19, she taught herself how to play guitar, make beats, and produce her own music.

== Career ==
=== 2014–2018 ===
In 2014, Ella May released her first EP, Breathing Underwater, which Afropunk stated, "gave me goose bumps from start to finish". Vice described her as "the future sound of neo-soul".

In 2015, she published her EP, Zero, which Spin dubbed "an irresistible combination of soul, jazz and electronic".

In 2018, her track "Table for One", made The New York Times list of most notable new songs. It was included in the soundtrack for the third season of Sex Education.

=== 2019–2021 ===
In 2019, Ella May released, "Tea & Sympathy". Earmilk called the track "an absolute feast for the ears". Her song "Girls Don’t Always Sing About Boys" was described as stunning by OnSmash.

In 2020, she released the single "Give a Little", which Clash declared a superb preview and likened to Guru's Jazzmatazz. She released a second single, "How Long 'Til We're Home" about feeling "too African for Britain, too British for Africa". Ella May was signed by John Boyega's label, Upper Room Records. Her album, Honey For Wounds was the first to be put out by the label. Vinyl Chapters gave the album a 4/5 review, writing, "it's a thoughtful and gently soulful album from a fresh talented artist that has a big future ahead of her". Ella May waited to release Honey For Wounds, due to the COVID-19 pandemic, but decided "there may never be a better time" to release the project. She won Best Jazz Act at the 2020 MOBO Awards. She performed her songs on Colors in July 2020.

In 2021, Ella May was shortlisted for Soul Act of the Year and Vocalist of the Year at the Jazz FM awards. She won Vocalist of the Year. Her song "Breathe" was featured in Billboard's "R&B/Hip-Hop Fresh Picks of the Week". Her tracks "Give a Little" and "Alright" were featured in soundtracks for Insecure and Queen Sugar. GRM Daily wrote, "contemporary visionary Ego Ella May continues to showcase the elegance she possesses as one of the top up and coming singers to grace our ears". Crash called her single "Introvert Hotline" divine. She performed on BBC Four with a 42-piece orchestra for the EFG London Jazz Festival at London's Royal Festival Hall, premiering her track, "For the Both of Us". Ella May also performed at The British Music Embassy, the official UK residency for SXSW.

=== 2022–present ===
In 2022, she covered "The Morning Side of Love", by Chico Hamilton, from Hamilton's 1975 Blue Note album Peregrinations. The track was featured on Blue Note Re:Imagined II, released by Universal Music Group. Albumism described the song as the "perfect slice of summertime bliss". Soul House wrote, "Ella May sprinkles her vocal magic over an understated arrangement." In reaction to the release of her track, "Miss U", Soul Bounce commented, "Ego Ella May and her unflinching approach to introspective songwriting is one of the best things to happen in music." She was featured on Beau Diako's song, "Alone", and Allysha Joy's "Calling You".

In 2023, she was featured on Kay Young's track "Woe Is Me", which Clash described as "intoxicating future soul, with the production carrying a Dilla-esque warmth."

WDET-FM has described Ella May as having "a voice that evokes shades of Billie Holiday, Erykah Badu, and Kissey". She is considered by The Guardian to be a "star of the UK soul renaissance".

== Discography ==
=== Albums ===
- So Far (Tru Thoughts, 2019)
- Honey for Wounds (Upper Room Records, 2020)
- Honey for Wounds (Deluxe) (Upper Room Records, 2021)
- Good Intentions (2026)

=== Extended plays ===
- Breathing Underwater (2014)
- Zero (2015)
- Fieldnotes (2021)
- Fieldnotes Pt II (2022)
- By the Way (Sony Music, 2023)
- Fieldnotes Pt III (2023)
