= Tiana Major9 =

British singer

- Born: Tiana Thomas-Ambersley; 22 November 1995 (age 30); London, England
- Genres: Alternative R&B; neo soul; jazz; reggae
- Occupations: Singer; songwriter
- Labels: Motown; Zero Point Nine

Tiana Thomas-Ambersley (born 22 November 1995), known professionally as Tiana Major9, is a British singer. She is best known for her 2019 single "Collide" (featuring EarthGang), released on the Queen & Slim film soundtrack. Earlier that year, she signed with Motown.

== Early life ==
Tiana Major9 was born and raised in the London Borough of Newham, England and grew up in a Jamaican household, listening and singing gospel in church from the age of five. They studied music at the City and Islington College before pursuing it as a career. They gained local recognition in 2014 as a finalist in MOBO's UnSung competition.

== Career ==
Between 2017 and 2018, Major9 released singles "Merry Go", "Levee (Let It Break)", and "Mr. Mysterious". On 25 January 2019, Major9 released their debut EP, Rehearsal @ Nine. They also appeared on Stormzy's album on the song "Rainfall" and the Queen & Slim soundtrack on the song "Collide", the latter being nominated for a Grammy Award. On 7 August 2020, Major9 released their second EP, At Sixes and Sevens, after signing with Motown.

== Artistry ==
The name Major9 refers to the major 9th chord. Her sound has been compared to the likes of Amy Winehouse, Jazmine Sullivan, Marsha Ambrosius and Lauryn Hill, blending elements of soul, R&B, jazz, and reggae.

== Personal life ==
Thomas-Ambersley uses she/they pronouns.

== Discography ==
=== Albums ===
Title	Album details
November Scorpio	Released: 13 February 2026; Label: +1 Records; Formats: CD, LP, Digital download

=== Extended plays ===
Title	EP details
Rehearsal @ Nine	Released: 25 January 2019; Label: Self-released; Format: Digital download
At Sixes and Sevens	Released: 7 August 2020; Label: Motown Records; Format: Digital download
Back at Sixes and Sevens	Released: 18 December 2020; Label: Motown Records; Format: Digital download
Major Mantras	Released: 12 February 2021; Label: Motown Records; Format: Digital download
At Sixes and Sevens Remixed	Released: 21 April 2021; Label: Motown Records; Format: Digital download
Fool Me Once	Released: 15 March 2022; Label: Motown Records; Format: Digital download

=== Singles ===
==== As lead artist ====
Title	Year	Peak chart positions	Album
Title	Year	US Adult R&B	Album
"Merry Go"	2017	–	Non-album singles
"Levee (Let It Break)"	2017	–	Non-album singles
"Mr. Mysterious"	2018	–	Non-album singles
"Collide" (with EarthGang)	2019	9	Queen & Slim: The Soundtrack and At Sixes and Sevens
"Think About You"	2020	–	At Sixes and Sevens
"Lucky"	2020	–	At Sixes and Sevens
"On Read"(with Lucky Daye)	2021	–	Table for Two
"Same Space? (Remix)" (with SIR)	2021	–	At Sixes and Sevens Remixed
"Real Affair (Remix) (feat. Vince Staples)	2021	–	At Sixes and Sevens Remixed
"Lucky - Things You Say Remix" (with Things You Say)	2021	–	Non-album single
"2 seater" (with Smino)	2022	–	Fool Me Once
"Try Peace..."	2022	–	Fool Me Once
"Try Peace... - A COLORS SHOW"	2022	–	Non-album single
"alone"	2024	–	November Scorpio
"money"	2025	–	November Scorpio
"Shook One"	2025	–	November Scorpio
"Always" (with Yebba)	2025	–	November Scorpio
"energy!" (with Keyon Harrold)	2026	–	November Scorpio

==== Guest appearances ====
List of non-single guest appearances, with other performing artists, showing year released and album name
Title	Year	Other artist(s)	Album
"Rainfall"	2019	Stormzy	Heavy Is the Head
"Silent Night"	2020	—N/a	A Motown Holiday
"Silly Games"	2021	—N/a	Small Axe (Music Inspired By The Original TV Series)
"Reason to Smile"	2022	Kojey Radical	Reason to Smile
"Talkin"	2022	Kojey Radical, Kelis	Reason to Smile
"Worth My While"	2022	Manny Norté, Stalk Ashley, Arya Starr	Non-album single
"homies"	2023	Saint Harison	lost a friend
"Sugar Water & Lime Pt2!"	2024	Elijah Blake	eiljah! (Deluxe Edition)

== Awards and nominations ==
Award	Year	Category	Work	Result	Ref.
Black Reel Awards	2020	Outstanding Original Song	"Collide" (with EarthGang)	Won	
Grammy Award	2021	Best R&B Song	"Collide" (with EarthGang)	Nominated	
