= Knucks (musician) =

- Born: Ashley Afamefuna Nwachukwu; 12 November 1994 (age 31)
- Origin: Kilburn, London, England
- Genre: Hip-hop
- Occupations: Rapper; record producer
- Years active: 2012–present
- Label: NoDaysOff

Ashley Afamefuna Nwachukwu (born 12 November 1994), better known by his stage name Knucks, is a British rapper and record producer.

== Background ==
=== Early life ===
Knucks was born Ashley Afamefuna Nwachukwu on 12 November 1994 in London, and is of Nigerian Igbo descent. In the early 2000s, whilst living in inner-city London, Knucks became interested in grime music, and would perform 8-bar relays with friends during and after school. In year 8, Knucks went to a Nigerian boarding school, where his love of music developed further. When he returned to London at age 14, Knucks discovered Nas's Illmatic, and Curren$y's music, and transitioned from grime to hip-hop.

He performed in front of an audience for the first time at age 16 or 17, at an open mic night hosted by Regent Studios in South Kilburn. He has gone on to release over 10 singles with his breakthrough into the UK hip-hop scene.

He graduated from University for the Creative Arts Rochester with a degree in animation and computer graphics.

== Career ==
=== 2014–2018, Killmatic and single releases ===
In 2014, he released his debut mixtape Killmatic, the title being a play on his hometown Kilburn and the Nas album Illmatic. The next year, he released the song "21 Candles" on SoundCloud. The song was a minor breakthrough for Knucks, with its music video premiering on SB.TV in March 2016. Between 2015 and 2018, Knucks would continue to release a series of singles, including "Breakfast at Tiffany's", "Turnover", "Vows" and the Not3s-assisted single "Hooper".

=== 2019–20: NRG 105 and London Class ===
In 2019, Knucks signed a record deal with Young Entrepreneurs Records and Island Records, releasing his debut extended play NRG 105 later that year in May. Titled in honour of Knucks' late manager Nathan "NRG" Rodney, the EP was supported by the singles "Rice & Stew" and "Wedding Rings" and featured ten tracks (four of which were skits), with guest appearances from Oscar #Worldpeace and Wretch 32. "Home", the closing track of the EP, was certified Silver by the British Phonographic Industry (BPI) in 2023.

Knucks left the label in 2020 and returned to being independent, releasing his second extended play London Class in September 2020. Inspired by the South Korean television series Itaewon Class, the EP featured twelve tracks (four of which were skits, similar to NRG 105), with guest appearances from Sam Wise, KXYZ, Loyle Carner, Venna and Kadiata.

=== 2021–2022: "Los Pollos Hermanos" and Alpha Place ===
In 2021, Knucks released "Los Pollos Hermanos", a single inspired by the fictional fast food restaurant chain Los Pollos Hermanos. The single was a breakthrough for Knucks, and was certified Platinum by the BPI. In May 2022, he released his debut album Alpha Place, which featured guest appearances from SL, Youngs Teflon, M1llionz, Sainté and Stormzy. "Los Pollos Hermanos" was included as a bonus track. Seven months later, on December 9, the deluxe version of Alpha Place was released with the previously released Kwengface-assisted track "Lucious" and a new track titled "Don’t Look Up". Alpha Place was certified Silver by the BPI in July 2023.

=== 2023–present: "Qui?" and A Fine African Man ===
In December 2023, Knucks appeared on the song "Qui?" with La Fève on the album 24.

His second studio album A Fine African Man was released on 31 October 2025.

== Discography ==
=== Studio albums ===
- Alpha Place (2022)
- A Fine African Man (2025)

=== Extended plays ===
- NRG 105 (2019)
- London Class (2020)

=== Mixtapes ===
- Killmatic (2014)
