= Thick of It (KSI song) =

2024 single by KSI featuring Trippie Redd

"Thick Of It"

Single by KSI featuring Trippie Redd
- Released: 3 October 2024
- Genre: Trap; pop rap; emo pop
- Length: 2:40
- Label: Atlantic; Warner
- Songwriters: Olajide Olatunji; Michael Lamar White II; Ray Michael Djan Jr.; Anthony Kiedis; Billy Crabtree; Chad Smith; Flea; John Frusciante; Joseph Baxter; Miles Gould; Vivan Proton Bellinfantie
- Producer: Djan

KSI singles chronology
"Easy" (2023)	"Thick of It" / "Low" (2024)	"Dirty" (2024)

Trippie Redd singles chronology
"LGLG" (2024)	"Thick of It" (2024)	"Radio" (2025)

Music video
- "Thick of It" on YouTube

Alternative cover
- Cover for the NLE Choppa remix

"Thick of It" is a song by English Internet personality and musician KSI featuring American rapper and singer Trippie Redd. This is the second collaboration between the two following "Wake Up Call". "Thick of It" was released for digital download and streaming via Warner Music Group and Atlantic Records on 3 October 2024 alongside the song "Low". "Thick of It" combines trap music with emo pop and pop rap and was inspired by the backlash towards KSI, his product Lunchly, and their controversies.

The song received overwhelming mockery from audiences and heavy negative criticism following the Lunchly controversy, but was still a commercial success, reaching number 6 on the UK Singles Chart and number 64 on the US Billboard Hot 100. A remix featuring fellow American rapper NLE Choppa was later released on 1 November 2024, Choppa's 22nd birthday. "Thick of It" was nominated for Song of the Year at the Brit Awards 2025.

== Background and production ==
Produced by Ran Michael Djan Jr., the song samples "Snow (Hey Oh)" by the Red Hot Chili Peppers. The second collaboration between KSI and Trippie Redd, it was recorded and released during the development of KSI's third album.

== Composition and lyrical interpretation ==
The song was based on the recent backlash directed to KSI. The song has been described as trap and emo pop/pop rap. In an interview with Clash, KSI described the song as being about "my life, what's going on, where I'm at and where I want to go," to "bring the listeners up to speed". The song is written in the key of B minor, with a tempo of 146 beats per minute.

== Promotion and release ==
The song was first previewed on 31 August 2024 at MF & DAZN: X Series 17 as a part of KSI's special concert. On 3 October, KSI released "Thick of It" alongside "Low", another single, for download and streaming through Atlantic Records and Warner Music Group. The song's release succeeded KSI's feud with content creator DanTDM in the wake of the controversy surrounding Lunchly, a product he co-founded in partnership with MrBeast and Logan Paul. Following backlash against his response from the YouTube community, KSI posted a tweet linking to the song while purporting it as an apology.

== Critical reception ==
Upon release, the song went viral. The music video gained over 5 million views within just three days, with Stephen Johnson of Lifehacker declaring it the "viral video of the week" on 7 October. The song received a negative reception upon release, with general audiences and content creators criticising and mocking it on social media, and people attending his concerts throwing Prime bottles at him while singing "Thick of It".

Criticism regarding the song included its lyrics and beat, and the song was described as "generic" and "lacking in substance". Elias Andrews of HotNewHipHop wrote that the song "lacks any real song structure, and consensus is that KSI raps about as convincingly as Ed Sheeran (not a compliment)." On the other hand, music website HipHopCanada displayed a positive review, complimenting the song for its "confident vibe".

Canadian rapper Drake commented in Adin Ross's live stream that the song was a "banger", although some interpreted it sarcastically. In a post authored by Trippie Redd, he stated: "I was held hostage to do this. If this doesn't hit 20 million views the first month, KSI won't let me go. Please free me."

Website Distractify published an article titled "Why Do People Hate KSI's New Song "Thick of It"?". The article talked about the song's recent hate and pointed out that "the song's music video has more dislikes on YouTube than the trailer for the new Minecraft live-action film—and we all know how unpopular that was." The publication concluded that the recent hate was "not because of his song, but his public figure as a whole", adding it may have been largely influenced by the Lunchly controversy, for which himself, MrBeast and Logan Paul are brand ambassadors.

KSI reacted multiple times to the song's backlash, first responding with a video titled "I'm getting cooked..." He also posted on X that the hate towards his song was "not funny" and posted another video reacting to TikTok clips of the song in which he expressed that the hatred felt "forced". In an interview with Capital, he expressed frustration with the hate. "Because music, you spend a lot of time, mind, body and soul into a piece of art, then you put that into the world then you've got people being like, 'Ah trash, you suck. Turn that off. Cringe'", he added.

As of October 2026, "Thick of It" is KSI's most viewed music video on YouTube, having over 135 million views.

== Awards and nominations ==
Awards and nominations for "Thick of It"
Year	Award	Category	Result	Ref.
2025	BRIT Awards	Song of the Year	Nominated	

== Personnel ==
- KSI – songwriting, vocals
- Trippie Redd – songwriting, vocals
- Ray Michael Djan Jr. – songwriting, producer, programmer
- Anthony Kiedis – songwriting
- Billy Crabtree – songwriting, backing vocals
- Chad Smith – songwriting
- Flea – songwriting
- John Frusciante – songwriting
- Joseph Baxter – songwriting, additional guitar
- Miles Gould – songwriting, producer, programmer, additional guitar
- Vivan Proton Bellinfantie – songwriting, producer, programmer, backing vocals
- Stuart Hawkes – mastering
- Geoff Swan – mixing

== Charts ==
The song was KSI's ninth Top 10 single in official charts.

Chart performance for "Thick of It"
Chart (2024–2025)	Peak position
Australia (ARIA)	29
Australia Hip Hop/R&B (ARIA)	3
Canada Hot 100 (Billboard)	31
Global 200 (Billboard)	71
Iceland (Tónlistinn)	28
Ireland (IRMA)	14
Lebanon Airplay (Lebanese Top 20)	9
Netherlands (Single Tip)	1
Netherlands (Dutch Top 40 Tipparade)	18
New Zealand (Recorded Music NZ)	17
Norway (VG-lista)	17
Singapore (RIAS)	28
Sweden (Sverigetopplistan)	48
UK Singles (Official Charts)	6
UK Hip Hop/R&B (Official Charts)	1
US Billboard Hot 100	64
US Hot R&B/Hip-Hop Songs (Billboard)	21

== Certifications ==
Certifications for "Thick of It"
Region	Certification	Certified units/sales
Australia (ARIA)	Platinum	70,000^{‡}
Canada (Music Canada)	Gold	40,000^{‡}
New Zealand (RMNZ)	Gold	15,000^{‡}
United Kingdom (BPI)	Gold	400,000^{‡}
United States (RIAA)	Gold	500,000^{‡}
^{‡} Sales+streaming figures based on certification alone.

== Release history ==
Release dates and formats for "Thick of It"
Region	Date	Format(s)	Version	Label(s)	Ref.
Various	3 October 2024	Digital download; streaming	Original	Atlantic; Warner	
Various	8 October 2024	Digital download; streaming	All Speeds Considered (Sped Up and Slowed Down)	Atlantic; Warner	
Various	1 November 2024	Digital download; streaming	NLE Choppa Remix	Atlantic; Warner	
