= Vexbolts =

American social media personality

- Vexbolts in 2024

TikTok information
- Page: Vexbolts
- Followers: 4.8 million
- Last updated: March 26 2026

Vexbolts is an American social media personality and TikTok creator known for viral gaming and meme-related videos, particularly content derived from Fortnite and his catchphrase "let him cook". He became the subject of the viral "Vexbolts mass unfollowing" campaign in late 2024 and early 2025, a TikTok trend that drew millions of temporary followers before a mass unfollow on New Year's Eve.

== Career ==
Vexbolts rose to prominence in 2023 after a clip of him playing Fortnite went viral, with the creator shouting "let him cook", a viral phrase that became closely associated with his online persona. After joining TikTok in 2021, he built an audience through gaming videos and meme posts derived from popular trends.

In late 2024, his content became increasingly associated with internet memes and "brain rot" humor, contributing to both his popularity and criticism online.

== Vexbolts mass unfollowing ==
In December 2024, Vexbolts became the target of a viral TikTok campaign urging users to unfollow him at 11:59 p.m. EST on December 31 so that he would be "left in 2024". The campaign spread rapidly through TikTok comments and videos, often using the copypasta "Vexbolts mass unfollowing Dec 31st, spread the word".

Although the campaign was intended to reduce his audience, coverage by multiple outlets noted that it had the opposite effect. His follower count reportedly rose from around 1 million or 1.5 million to more than 8.5 million, before the mass unfollowing began.

After midnight on January 1, 2025, Vexbolts lost millions of followers, including roughly 1 million in seconds according to reports, but still retained a larger audience than before the campaign began. Variety described the episode as an example of self-aware online promotion that turned hostile attention into audience growth.

== TikTok Live record ==
On December 31, 2024, Vexbolts staged a "funeral" livestream on TikTok as the unfollowing event approached. According to Dexerto, the stream reached 996,200 concurrent viewers, which the publication said may have set a TikTok Live viewership record and ranked among the highest-viewed livestreams on record.

== Collaborations ==
As the unfollowing campaign gained attention, Vexbolts collaborated with several large creators and brands. One of the most popular collaborations was with YouTube creator MrBeast, who appeared in a December 31, 2024 TikTok video joining the "left in 2024" joke. Dexerto reported that the video received more than 74 million views in less than one day.

Variety later reported that MrBeast appeared in three videos with Vexbolts to promote Lunchly meal kits, with the posts drawing about 151 million views combined in a few days.
