= MrBeast =

American YouTuber and philanthropist (born 1998)

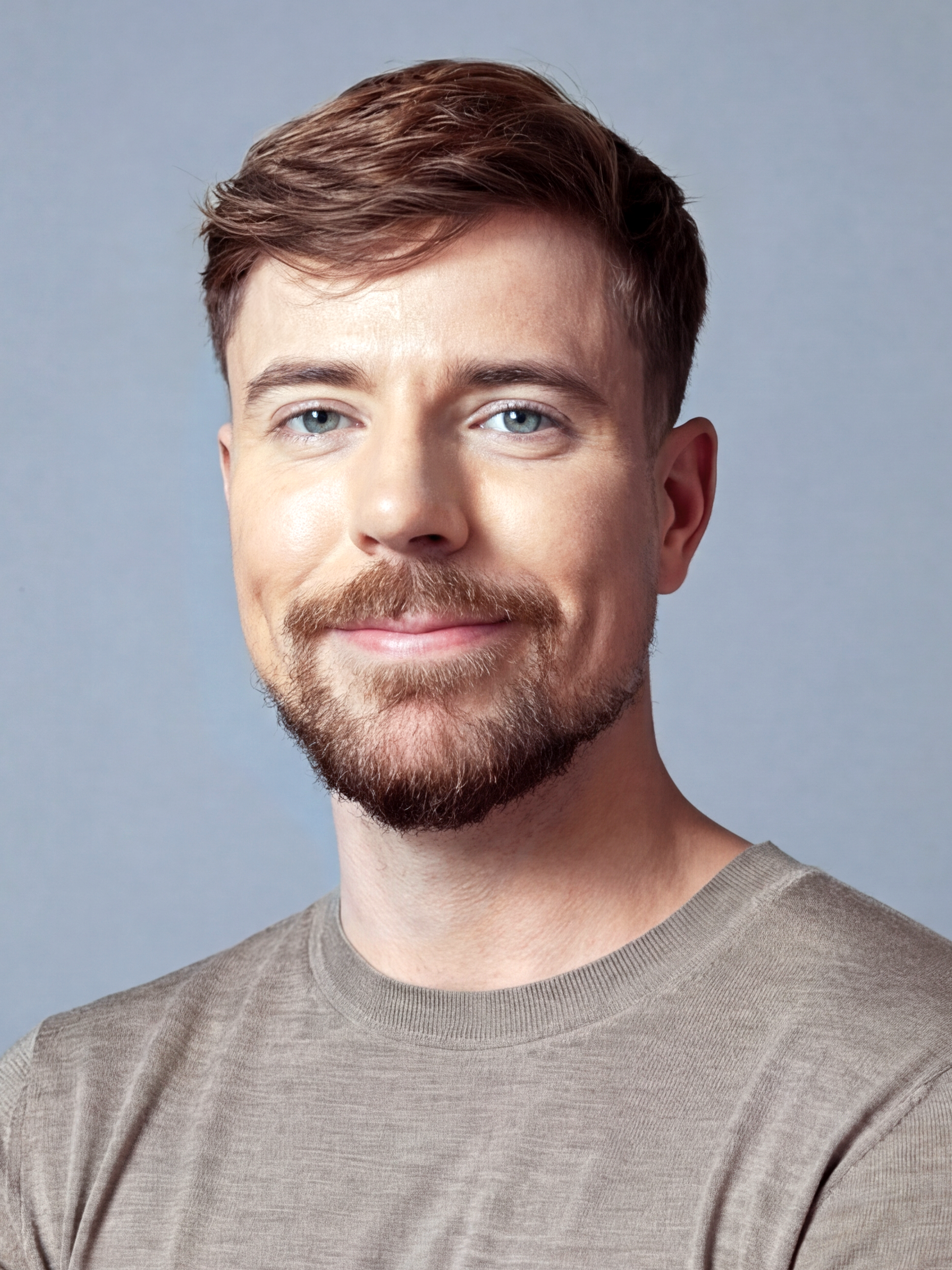
- Donaldson in 2026
- Born: James Stephen Donaldson; May 7, 1998 (age 28); Wichita, Kansas, U.S.
- Other names: Jimmy Donaldson; MrBeast6000; MrLean
- Occupations: YouTuber; media personality; entrepreneur; philanthropist
- Years active: 2012–present
- Spouse: Thea Booysen (m. 2026)
- Partner(s): Maddy Spidell (2019–2022)

Bilibili information
- Channel: 野兽先生MrBeast
- Years active: 2023–present
- Followers: 9.925 million

Instagram information
- Page: MrBeast
- Years active: 2015–present
- Followers: 91.2 million

Kick information
- Channel: MrBeast
- Years active: 2025–present
- Followers: 413.8 thousand

TikTok information
- Page: MrBeast
- Years active: 2018–present
- Followers: 147.7 million

Twitch information
- Channel: MrBeast6000
- Years active: 2024 (Note: Exact date unknown; late 2023 to early 2024.)–present
- Followers: 638.9 thousand

X information
- Handle: @MrBeast
- Years active: 2014–present
- Followers: 34.9 million

YouTube information
- Channel: MrBeast
- Years active: 2012–present
- Genres: Stunts; challenges; game show; philanthrophy; vlog
- Subscribers: 527 million
- Views: 147 billion
- MrBeast's voice At the 2022 Kids' Choice Awards; Recorded April 2022
- Last updated: November 22, 2026
- Website: MrBeast.Store (Merch Store)

James Stephen "Jimmy" Donaldson (Note: Attributed to multiple sources.) (born May 7, 1998), better known as MrBeast (formerly MrBeast6000), is an American YouTuber, internet personality, entrepreneur, and philanthropist. He is the founder of Beast Industries, a conglomerate that holds various media channels, MrBeast Burger, Feastables, Lunchly, and more. He produces high-paced YouTube videos built around elaborate challenges and philanthropic efforts that are noted for their high production values. With more than 527 million subscribers, his main channel is the most subscribed on YouTube. He is also the third most followed account on TikTok.

Donaldson was born in Wichita, Kansas, and raised in Greenville, North Carolina. He began posting videos to YouTube in early 2012 under the original username MrBeast6000. His early uploads ranged from Let's Play videos to estimations of other YouTubers' wealth. In January 2017, after his video "I Counted to 100,000!" drew tens of thousands of views within days, his productions quickly became more extravagant. As the audience expanded, Donaldson brought longtime friends into the brand and launched companion channels including Beast Reacts (inactive as of 2026, formerly BeastHacks), MrBeast Gaming, MrBeast 2 (formerly MrBeast Shorts), and Beast Philanthropy.

He co-founded Team Trees—a fundraiser for the Arbor Day Foundation that has raised more than $24 million—and launched Lunchly, a food and snack brand meant to compete with Lunchables. He also co-founded Team Seas, a fundraiser for Ocean Conservancy and The Ocean Cleanup that has raised over $30 million, and created the reality competition series Beast Games. In 2025, he co-founded Team Water, another fundraiser that raised over $40 million for WaterAid.

Donaldson won the Creator of the Year award at the Streamy Awards in 2020, 2021, 2022, and 2023. He also won Favorite Male Creator at the 2022, 2023, 2024, and 2025 Nickelodeon Kids' Choice Awards. In 2023 and 2026, Time named him one of the world's 100 most influential people, and the magazine included him in its 2025 Time 100 Creators list and Beast Industries in the 2026 100 Most Influential Companies list. Forbes ranked him first among the highest-paid YouTube creators in 2026. Fortune estimated his net worth at approximately $2.6 billion in 2026.

== Early life and education ==
James Stephen Donaldson was born in Wichita, Kansas, on May 7, 1998, to Susan Parisher and Charles Donaldson. He was primarily raised in Greenville, North Carolina. He moved frequently and was often cared for by au pairs because his parents worked long hours and served in the military. His parents divorced in 2007. In 2016, Donaldson graduated from Greenville Christian Academy, a private Christian high school in the area. While at Greenville Christian, Donaldson played baseball as an outfielder for several years. He was diagnosed with Crohn's disease as a teenager, which led him to stop playing sports. He briefly attended Pitt Community College in Winterville, North Carolina, before dropping out.

After dropping out of college, Donaldson and his friends attempted to analyze and understand YouTube's recommendation algorithm to create viral videos. Donaldson recalled regarding this period, "There's a five-year point in my life where I was just relentlessly, unhealthily obsessed with studying virality, studying the YouTube algorithm. I woke up. I would order Uber Eats food. And then I would just sit on my computer all day just studying shit nonstop with [other YouTubers]."

== YouTube career ==
=== 2012–2017: Early career ===
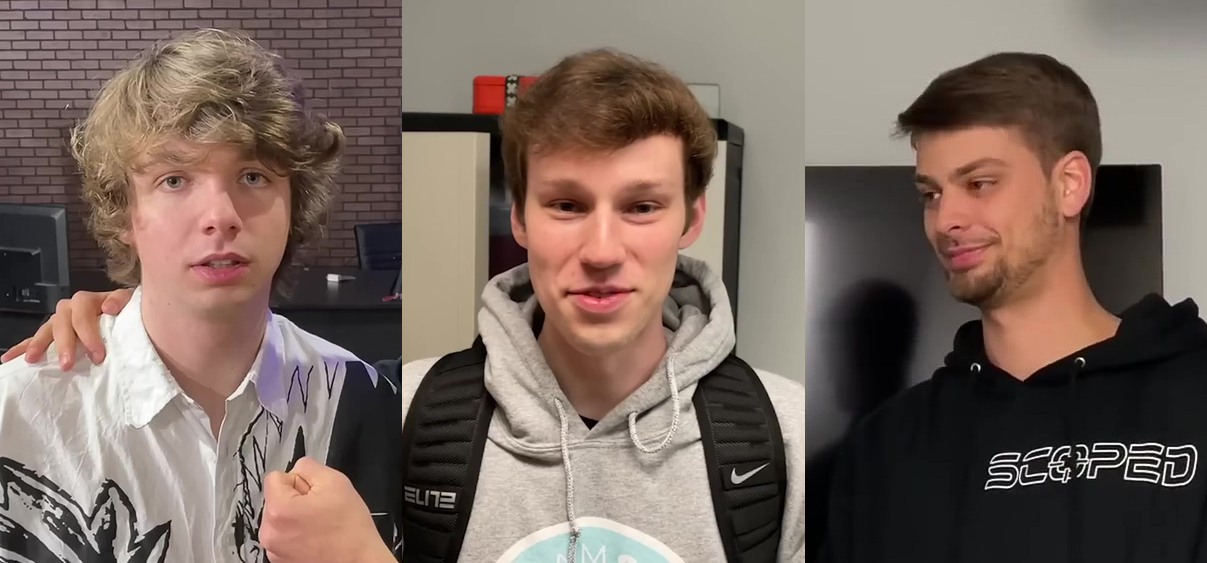
Current members of the MrBeast crew. From left to right: Karl Jacobs, Nolan Hansen, and Chandler Hallow

Donaldson uploaded his first YouTube video in February 2012, at the age of 13, under the channel name "MrBeast6000". His early content included Let's Plays videos focused on Minecraft and Call of Duty: Black Ops II, videos estimating the wealth of other YouTubers, videos offering advice to aspiring YouTube creators, and commentary on YouTube drama. Donaldson appeared infrequently in these videos.

From 2015 to 2018, Donaldson gained popularity with his "Worst Intros on YouTube" series, poking fun at YouTube video introductions. By mid-2016, Donaldson had around 30,000 subscribers. Donaldson dropped out of college in late 2016 to pursue a full-time career as a YouTuber. His mother disapproved of his decision and forced him to leave the family home as a result.

As his channel grew, Donaldson hired four childhood friends—Ava Kris Tyson, Chandler Hallow, Garrett Ronalds, and Jake Franklin—to contribute to his channel. Franklin and Ronalds left the crew in 2020, whereas Tyson left the crew in 2024.

=== 2017–2020: Rise to fame ===
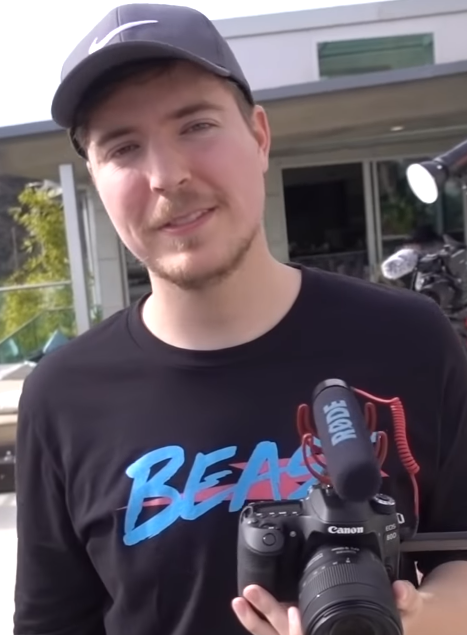
Donaldson in December 2018

On January 9, 2017, Donaldson published an almost day-long video of himself counting to 100,000, which became his breakthrough viral video. The ordeal took him 40 hours, with some parts sped up to "keep it under 24 hours". Donaldson gained popularity during this period with stunts, such as attempting to break glass using a hundred megaphones, watching paint dry for an hour, staying underwater for 24 hours, which ended up failing due to health issues, and an unsuccessful attempt to spin a fidget spinner for a day. By 2018, Donaldson had given out $1 million through his stunts, earning him the title "YouTube's biggest philanthropist".

In June 2017, Donaldson gained his first brand deal, from a digital collectibles app called Quidd. This partnership funded his first philanthropic video in June 2017, where he gave the entirety of the $10,000 sponsor's fee to a homeless person. This set the stage for his now-famous brand of large-scale giveaways and philanthropic stunts.

During the PewDiePie vs. T-Series rivalry in 2018, a competition to become the most-subscribed channel on YouTube, Donaldson bought billboards and numerous television and radio advertisements to help PewDiePie gain more subscribers than T-Series. During Super Bowl LIII, he purchased multiple seats for himself and his team, whose shirts spelled out "Sub 2 PewDiePie".

In March 2019, Donaldson organized and filmed a real-life battle royale competition in Los Angeles with prizes totaling $200,000 (two games were played, each awarding $100,000) in collaboration with Apex Legends. Apex Legends publisher Electronic Arts sponsored the event and prize pool.

In April 2020, Donaldson hosted a $250,000 rock, paper, scissors tournament featuring 32 influencers. The event became YouTube's most-watched live Original at the time, peaking at 662,000 concurrent viewers. Professional esports player Nadeshot won the event. In October 2020, Donaldson hosted another influencer tournament. This time it was on trivia, and featured 24 competitors with a grand prize of $300,000. The tournament's winners were siblings Charli and Dixie D'Amelio, which caused controversy due to claims that they cheated.

=== 2021–present: mainstream success ===
On January 1, 2021, Donaldson released the "YouTube Rewind 2020, Thank God It's Over" video. In Donaldson's video, he explains that he had always believed that YouTubers "should get more say in Rewind", and with this in mind, he decided to call "hundreds of YouTubers". At the end of the video, Donaldson gives a shout-out to PewDiePie, citing him and his 2018 Rewind as the inspiration for Donaldson's Rewind. Donaldson signed a Facebook and Snapchat content distribution deal with Jellysmack a month later.

In April 2021, Donaldson announced a sponsorship with mobile banking app Current, marking the first time he took an ownership stake as part of a sponsorship deal. Donaldson stated he struck the deal with Current's SVP of Marketing Adam Hadi, who worked with Donaldson on his first brand deal with Quidd in 2017.

In November 2021, Donaldson uploaded "$456,000 Squid Game in Real Life!", a recreation of the survival drama streaming television series Squid Game in real life. The video had 456 people compete for a $456,000 cash prize. It was one of the most-watched YouTube videos of 2021, receiving over 130 million views within a week. A review of the video in Vice argued that it "badly misunderstood the anti-capitalist message of Squid Game". Despite this, Squid Game creator Hwang Dong-hyuk has reacted positively to the recreations and parodies of the series.

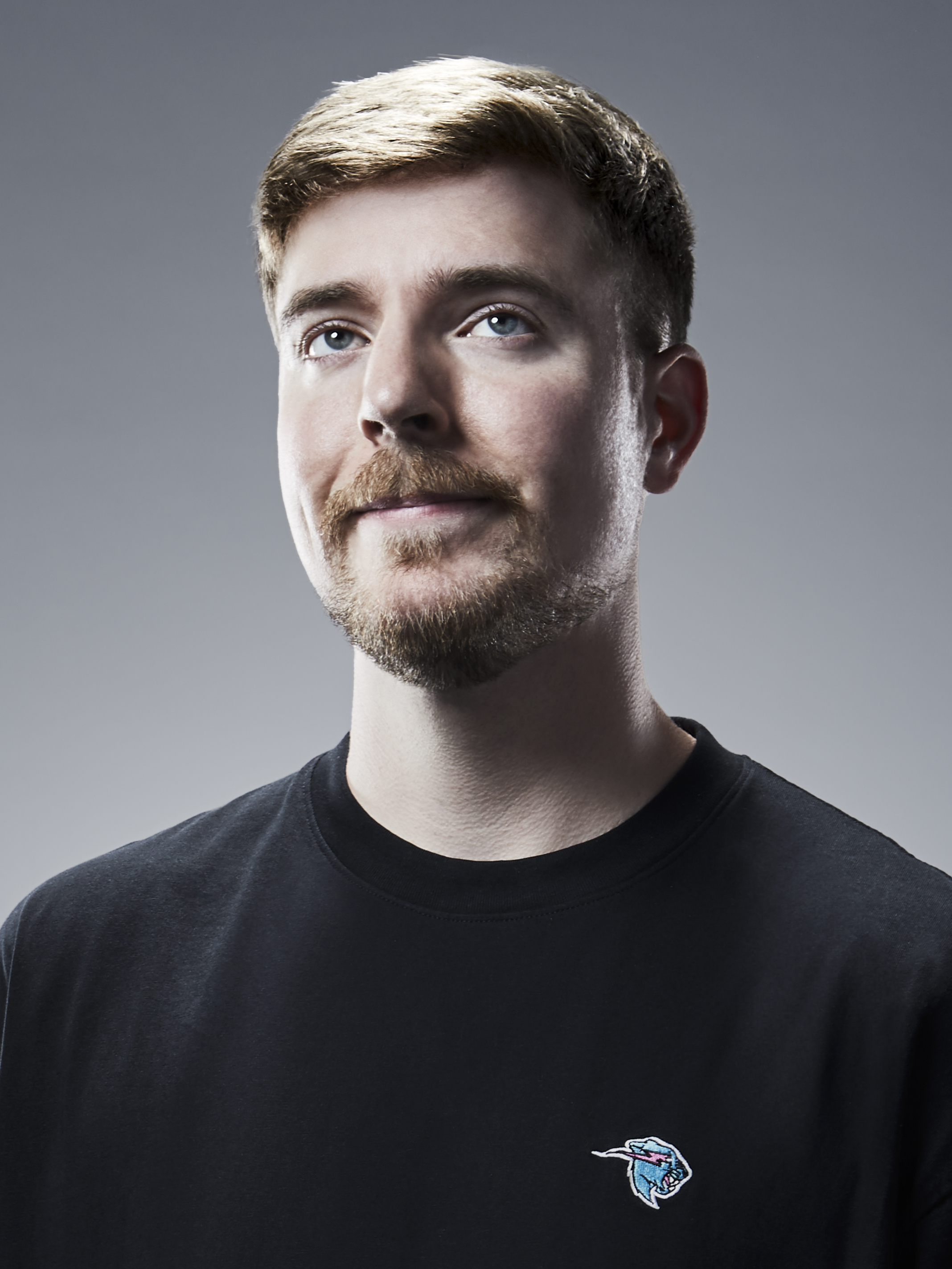
Donaldson in September 2023

In December 2021, Donaldson created a third influencer tournament featuring 15 competitors with a grand prize of $1 million. In January 2022, Forbes ranked Donaldson as YouTube's highest-earning creator, earning an estimated $54 million in 2021. Forbes stated that his income in 2021 would have placed him 40th in the 2020 Forbes Celebrity 100, earning as much money as Vin Diesel and Lewis Hamilton did in 2020.

On July 28, 2022, Donaldson surpassed 100 million subscribers on his main channel, making him the fifth channel and the second individual YouTuber to achieve the milestone. On November 17, 2022, Donaldson achieved the Guinness World Record of "Most Subscribers for an Individual Male on YouTube" with his MrBeast channel at 112 million subscribers. The previous record holder, PewDiePie, had held the record as the most subscribed YouTuber for almost ten years. Donaldson achieved one billion video views over 30 days on his main YouTube channel in November 2022. On October 15, 2023, Donaldson surpassed 200 million subscribers. His YouTube Shorts video "Would You Fly to Paris for a Baguette?" is the most-watched video on his main YouTube channel, having more than 1.5 billion views and 56 million likes as of May 2025.

On June 2, 2024, Donaldson surpassed India-based music label and film production company T-Series for the title of the most subscribed channel on YouTube, with 267 million. On July 10, 2024, Donaldson became the first YouTuber to surpass 300 million subscribers. On July 13, 2024, Donaldson uploaded his 300 million subscribers special, "50 YouTubers Fight for $1,000,000". The video featured guest appearances from Howie Mandel, Miranda Cosgrove, and Joey Chestnut. The video accumulated 71 million views in its first 24 hours, becoming Donaldson's most-viewed video in that timeframe. In his video "Beat Ronaldo, Win $1,000,000", Cristiano Ronaldo, Tom Brady, and Bryson DeChambeau made guest appearances. On April 25, 2025, Donaldson and Uruguayan YouTuber Fede Vigevani hosted an influencer basketball game featuring a team of Spanish-speaking creators and a team of English-speaking creators. Neymar, Stephen Curry, and Serena Williams made guest appearances in the video "Beat Neymar, Win $500,000". On June 1, 2025, Donaldson became the first YouTuber to surpass 400 million subscribers. On June 12, 2026, Donaldson became the first creator to reach 500 million YouTube subscribers, marking the milestone with a live stream countdown. Over 600,000 people watched the live stream.

== Video content ==
In his early career, Donaldson primarily uploaded Let's Plays videos, "best and worst" roundups, and commentary about YouTube culture. His current content usually falls into three formats: stunt challenges that demand difficult or risky tasks, so-called "junklord" experiments that rely on an unusually large quantity of a single product, and giveaway competitions that award substantial cash or prizes, often through games. (Note: Examples of each genre: Stunt: "Microwaving a Microwave," "I Counted to 100,000"; Junklord: "I Built a Giant House Using Only Legos," "I Ate $100,000 Golden Ice Cream."; Giveaway: "Extreme $500,000 Game of Tag," "Giving a Random Homeless Man $10,000") Giveaway videos remain a defining element of his channel.

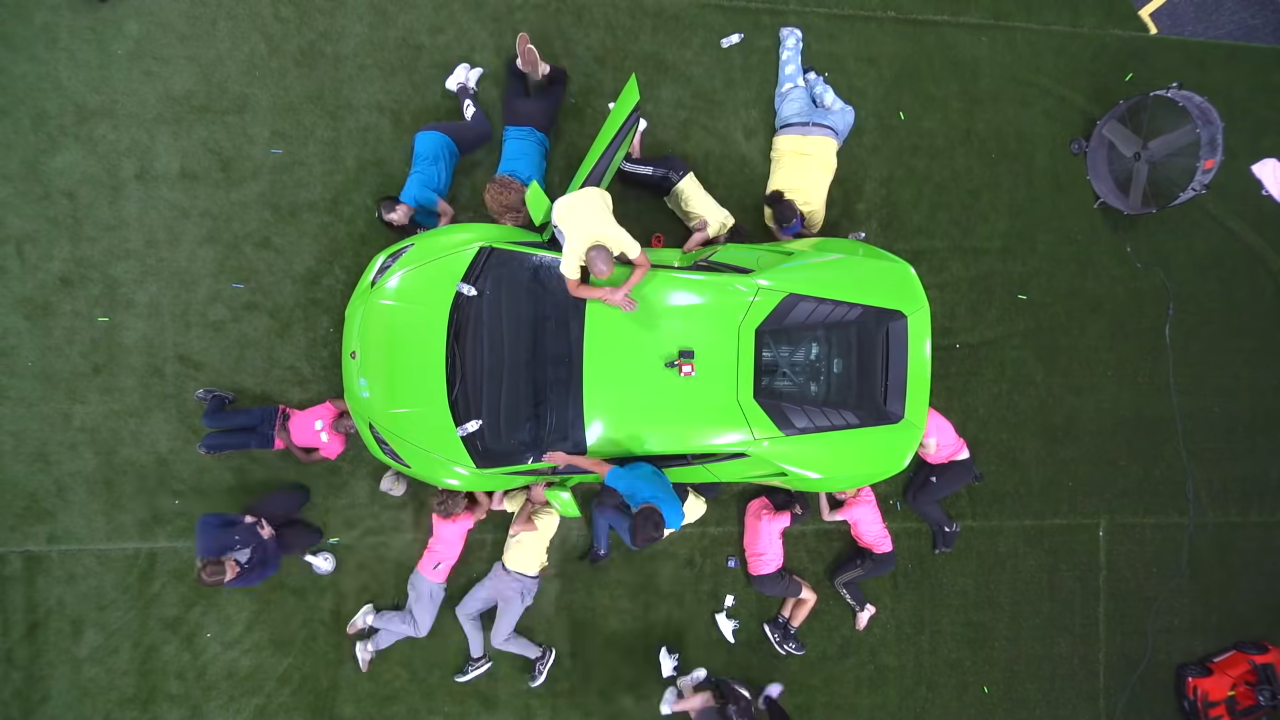
An example of Donaldson's YouTube content

Donaldson designs each video to satisfy YouTube's recommendation algorithm by maximizing click-through rate and viewer retention. He focuses on striking topics, titles, and thumbnails to encourage clicks, aiming for concepts he considers "original, creative" and essential viewing. He favors bold keywords such as "24-hours" and "challenge" in titles, pairs them with simple, brightly lit thumbnails, and introduces the premise within the opening 30 seconds before promising a finale to hold attention through the usual 10–30 minute runtime.

Brand sponsorships and Google's AdSense program primarily fund Donaldson's productions. By 2022 he was reportedly spending about $1 million on each flagship video, supported by earnings from his lower-cost reaction and gaming channels. The Verge described the resulting cycle as self-perpetuating, with each viral success attracting larger brand deals and higher AdSense income that fund even bigger giveaways. Donaldson has said he prefers to reinvest the revenue so he can keep scaling his ideas. He also generates additional revenue through ventures that primarily focus on consumer goods, including MrBeast Burger, Lunchly, and Feastables.

Many of his employees include people familiar with Donaldson, such as friends and family members. In September 2025, Donaldson uploaded the promotional video "I Bought the NFL", which led to a misunderstanding after some viewers thought he had actually purchased the National Football League. The video was intended to promote YouTube's first-ever free livestream of an NFL game.

MrBeast video content is now produced by Beast Industries Studios in Greenville, North Carolina.

== Business ventures ==
=== Beast Industries ===
Beast Industries is an American holding company founded by MrBeast and led by CEO Jeffrey Housenbold. It operates in the media, entertainment, consumer product, financial services and telecommunications industries. The company manages other ventures founded by Donaldson, including Feastables and the nonprofit organization Beast Philanthropy. As of 2026, it is valued at $5 billion.

=== Food ===
==== MrBeast Burger ====
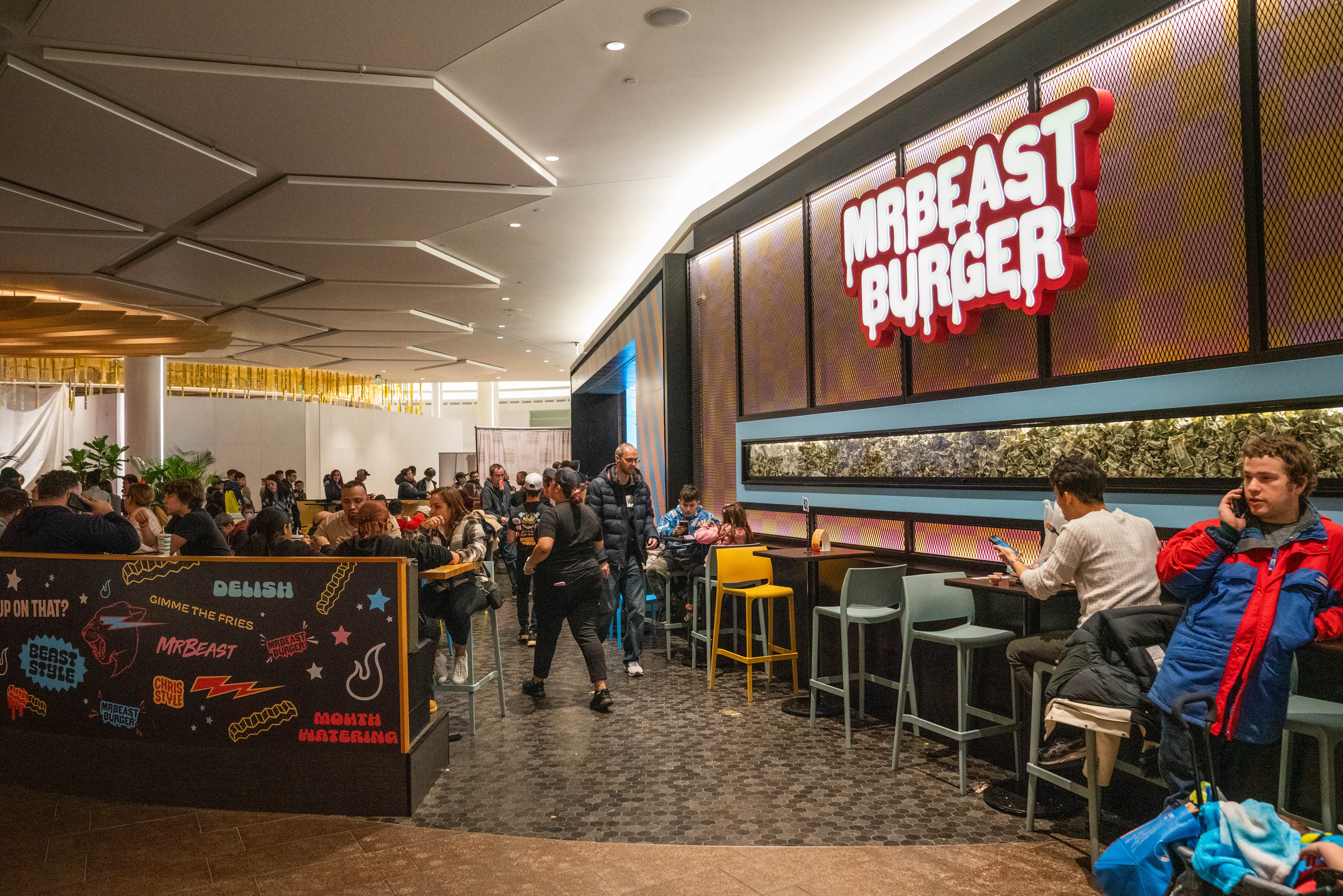
The first physical MrBeast Burger restaurant in New Jersey

Producer Will Hyde told The Wake Weekly in November 2020 that Donaldson would debut MrBeast Burger the following month as a virtual restaurant brand. His team partnered with Virtual Dining Concepts so existing kitchens could license the menu and fulfill delivery orders through third-party apps. The concept expanded to more than 2,000 locations worldwide before opening its first physical restaurant at the American Dream Mall in East Rutherford, New Jersey, on September 4, 2022. Donaldson said in 2024 that he was moving on from the venture and sought to close it because of quality concerns that he believed were hurting his brand.

==== Feastables ====
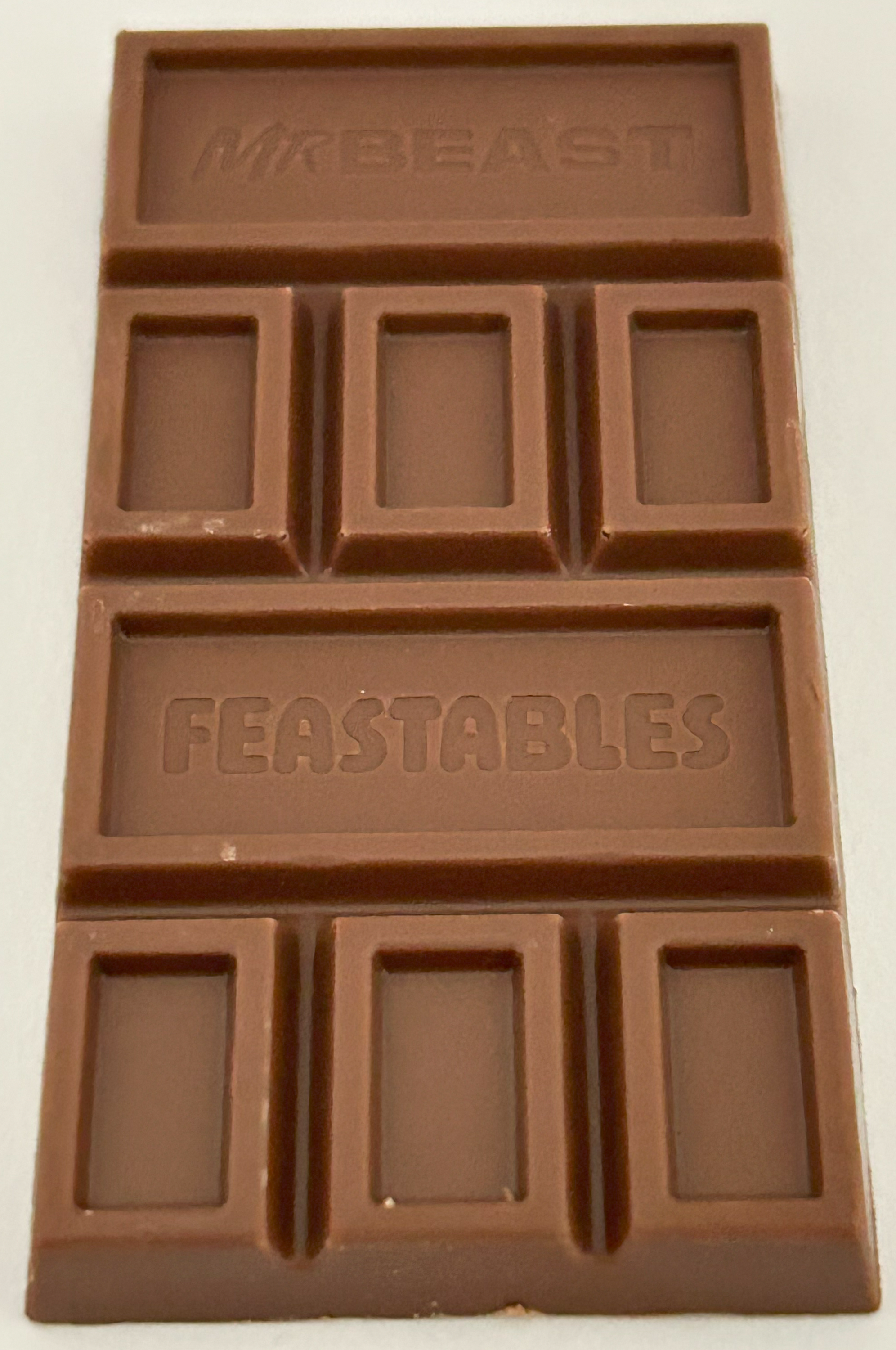
A new formula Feastables bar

Donaldson introduced Feastables in January 2022 with a line of MrBeast Bar chocolates in original, almond, and quinoa crunch flavors. The launch campaign included a sweepstakes worth more than $1,000,000, with $10,000 prizes and a challenge that mirrored Charlie and the Chocolate Factory by offering finalists a chance to compete for a chocolate factory. A June 2022 video documented the elimination-style competition, featured celebrity chef Gordon Ramsay as a judge, and culminated in a winner choosing between the factory and $500,000 in cash. Feastables generated an estimated $10 million in sales within its first few months after launch. The company introduced revised recipes and packaging in February 2024.

==== Lunchly ====
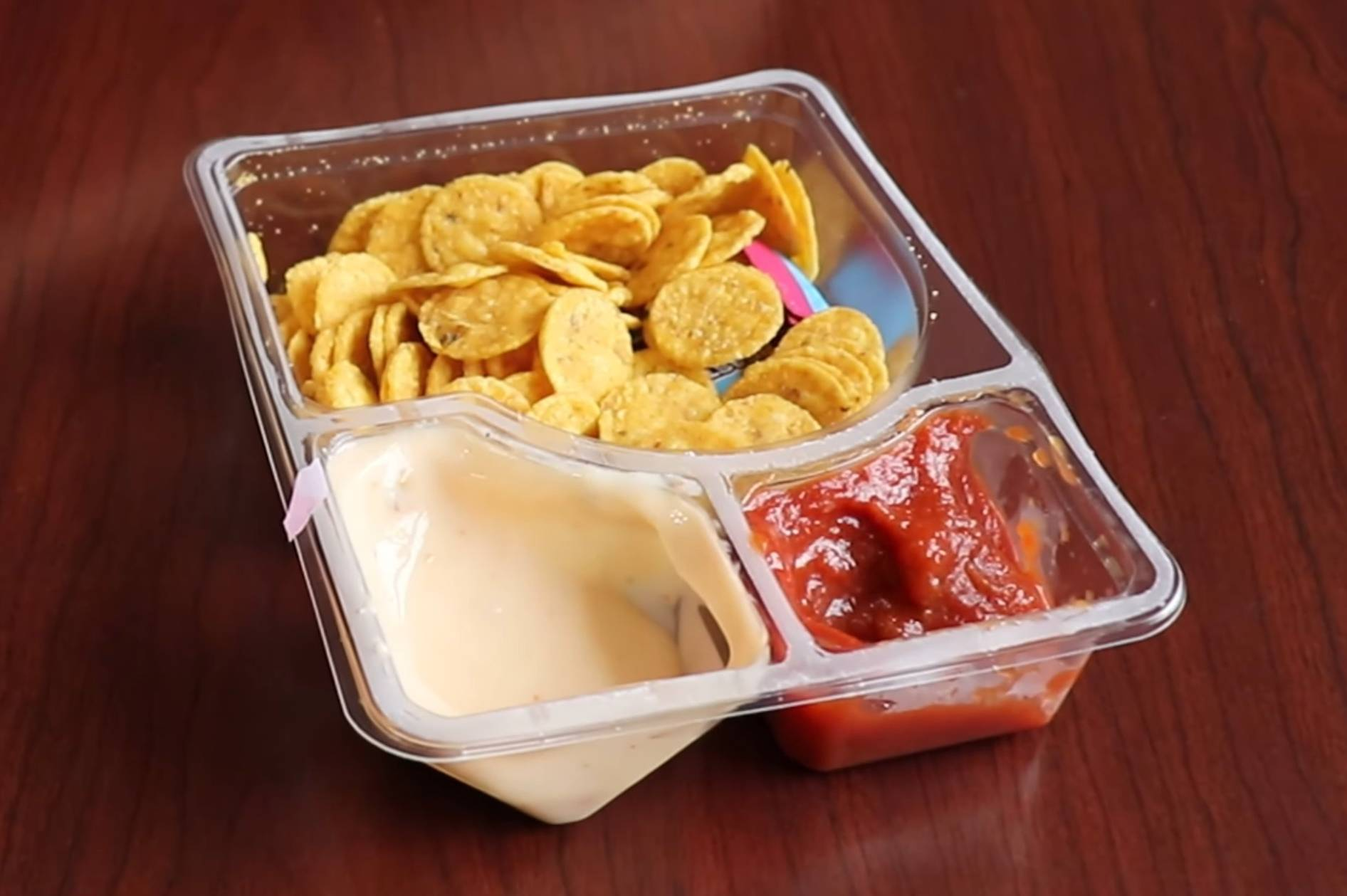
Lunchly-brand "nacho chips with queso blanco and salsa" snack kit

Donaldson unveiled the Lunchly snack-kit brand in September 2024 as a joint venture with fellow creators Olajide "KSI" Olatunji and Logan Paul. Marketed as a healthier alternative to Lunchables, the kits paired Prime drinks and Feastables chocolate bars with options such as turkey and crackers, nachos with salsa and cheese, or pizza components.

=== Step ===
In February 2026, Donaldson's Beast Industries acquired the youth-oriented fintech app Step. The app is focused on providing tools to manage money and build credit. In a tweet posted February 9, Donaldson said he hoped the acquisition would help improve financial literacy among young people.

=== Television ===
In 2023, a free ad-supported streaming television channel named Mr. Beast that shows only previously released MrBeast YouTube videos began airing on the Roku Channel service.

He has also appeared as a guest judge on Gordon Ramsay's Food Stars in May 2023.

In July 2026, ABC announced that Donaldson would appear as a guest investor on the 18th season of the business reality television series Shark Tank. He is set to be joined on the panel by Jeffrey Housenbold, the CEO of Donaldson's holding company, Beast Industries.

==== Beast Games ====
In March 2024, Donaldson and Amazon MGM Studios announced their plans to create a new reality competition series Beast Games, set to air exclusively on Prime Video. On December 19, 2024, Donaldson released Beast Games on Amazon Prime Video. With 1,000 contestants competing for a $5 million cash prize—the biggest single prize in the history of television and streaming—the show received several Guinness World Records. On May 12, 2025, the series was renewed for two additional seasons. Donaldson stated that his $100 million deal with Amazon was a "poor financial decision" as he lost tens of millions of dollars from Beast Games.

Beast Games, Amazon, and Donaldson faced criticism after contestants complained that they had been denied food, water, medication, and beds during production. Additionally, several contestants were hospitalized during the first filming sessions, with over a dozen contestants claiming that various injuries had occurred while participating in the challenges and that many had been seen being removed from the arena on stretchers. A spokesperson of Donaldson would blame external factors such as the global computer systems outage caused by CrowdStrike's update to its software, "extreme weather and other unexpected logistical and communications issues".

The second season of Beast Games, "Strong vs Smart", pitted 100 of the smartest contestants in the world against 100 of the strongest contestants. The show also collaborated with Survivor, with an episode of Beast Games filmed in Fiji and a special cameo from Donaldson on Survivor 50.

=== Beast Land theme park ===
Donaldson opened Beast Land, a temporary amusement park in Riyadh, Saudi Arabia, which ran from November 13 to December 27, 2025, as part of Riyadh Season. The theme park featured rides inspired by videos from the MrBeast YouTube channel.

=== The Most Dangerous Games ===
In 2025, he announced a collaboration with James Patterson on a thriller novel; The Most Dangerous Games was published by HarperCollins the following year.

=== Rapping ===
In August 2026, Donaldson posted a snippet of a remix of "Dead Fresh" he made with American rapper Lil Baby under the rap name "MrLean". The collaboration stems from a meme known as "Hood MrBeast" that went viral in May 2025. Shortly after the song went viral, Donaldson teased a "MrLean rap album". In September 2026, MrBeast was sued for $100,000 by the manager of late rapper Lucas Coly, whom the monikers MrLean, heavily influences, with claims that request for credit were ignored while this character continues to make financial gains.

=== Other investments and partnerships ===
Donaldson invested in the gaming startup Backbone, supporting its Backbone One controller and companion content app for mobile players.

In 2020, Donaldson partnered with Brooklyn art collective MSCHF to launch Finger on the App, a one-off mobile endurance contest where players kept a finger on their phone screen until one person remained to claim $25,000. The competition ran for more than 70 hours and ended with four winners who each received $20,000. Its popularity prompted Finger on the App 2, originally slated for December 2020 but delayed until March 2021 after heavy downloads overwhelmed the servers. The sequel offered a $100,000 grand prize, and the champion outlasted the field for roughly 51 hours while the runner-up earned $20,000.

In 2021, he partnered with the Creative Juice financial network to launch Juice Funds, a $2 million pool that invests in emerging creators.

In 2022, Donaldson announced a partnership with East Carolina University to establish a credentialing program for employees in the creator industry, expected launch sometime in 2023. As of October 2025, the program had not yet materialized, with minimal updates from Donaldson and ECU.

In April 2021, Donaldson became a long-term investor and partner in the financial technology company Current, which promoted the deal through giveaways. Later that month, he also faced criticism when fans lost money in a cryptocurrency venture he had endorsed.

== Philanthropy ==
=== Team Trees ===
The logo used for #Team Trees, 2019

On October 25, 2019, Donaldson and fellow YouTuber Mark Rober launched #TeamTrees on YouTube to raise $20 million for the Arbor Day Foundation by January 1, 2020, so the group could plant one tree per donated dollar by December 2022. Creators including Rhett & Link, Marshmello, iJustine, Marques Brownlee, The Slow Mo Guys, Ninja, Simone Giertz, Jacksepticeye, and Smarter Every Day amplified the effort, and the foundation began planting in U.S. national parks that same month.

By December 19, the fundraiser had already cleared its $20 million target. High-profile donors such as Jack Dorsey, Susan Wojcicki, Elon Musk, and Tobias Lütke contributed, along with companies including Discovery, Verizon, and PopCap. Shopify CEO Tobias Lütke made the single largest pledge at 1,000,001 trees.

As of June 2025, supporters have funded more than 24.8 million trees through the initiative. A PBS Terra report noted that only six percent of the first 2,000 trees planted in one monitored location survived, highlighting the challenges of long-term reforestation.

=== Team Seas ===
The logo used for#Team Seas, 2021

On October 29, 2021, Donaldson and Rober introduced #TeamSeas to raise $30 million by January 1, 2022, for the Ocean Conservancy and The Ocean Cleanup, with the goal of removing 30 million pounds (14 million kilograms) of debris from oceans, rivers, and beaches. Thousands of creators, among them AzzyLand, DanTDM, TommyInnit, LinusTechTips, TierZoo, LEMMiNO, The Infographics Show, Hannah Stocking, Dhar Mann, and Marques Brownlee, promoted the campaign, and BEN plus TubeBuddy's eight-million-creator initiative provided additional reach. As of June 2025, contributors have raised more than $34 million ($34,080,191) for the effort.

=== Team Water ===
The logo used for Team Water, 2025

On August 1, 2025, Donaldson and Rober launched #TeamWater to raise $40 million for WaterAid by the end of the month. The campaign set out to deliver lasting clean-water access for two million people and enlisted more than 3,000 creators to help meet the goal. As of 22 September 2025, donations exceeded the target, totaling more than $41 million ($41,631,423).

=== Beast Philanthropy ===
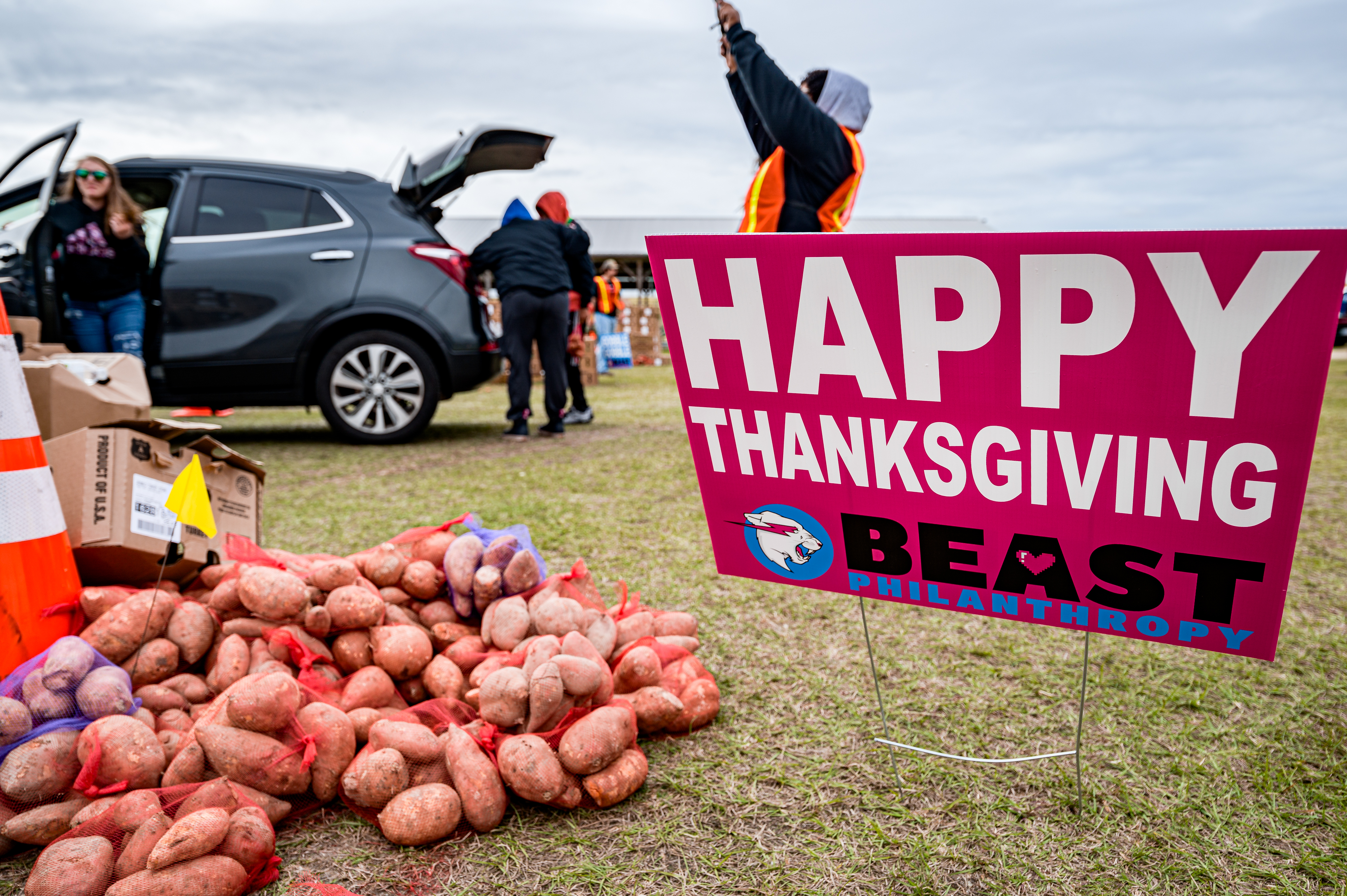
Greenville received Thanksgiving meals as part of an initiative by Beast Philanthropy and Jennie-O.

Donaldson launched the Beast Philanthropy YouTube channel on September 17, 2020, announcing a dedicated food bank and naming longtime collaborator Darren Margolias as executive director. The channel states that it donates all advertising revenue, brand deals, and merchandise proceeds to charity.

Beast Philanthropy campaigns have included distributing 10,000 turkeys in Greenville, delivering 20,000 pairs of shoes to children in Africa, building 100 wells for communities with limited access to clean water, and donating $300,000 in technology to schools. Donaldson has also produced videos that fund medical procedures, helping 1,000 blind people see again, 1,000 deaf people regain hearing, and 2,000 people walk again.

== Legal issues ==
=== Class action lawsuit ===
In September 2024, five former contestants on Beast Games filed a class action lawsuit in Los Angeles County Superior Court against Donaldson, Amazon, and the show's production partners. They alleged chronic mistreatment on set, including sexual harassment, unsafe conditions, and unpaid expenses. The plaintiffs also said they were pressured to sign illegal contracts and submit false paperwork in order to secure Nevada tax credits for the production. As of October 2026, the lawsuit has not reached a resolution.

=== Unauthorized tour of Mayan ruins ===
In May 2025, Mexican authorities accused Donaldson of exploiting the Chichén Itzá ruins after he released the video "I Explored 2,000-Year-Old Ancient Temples". Officials said the footage showed him waiting until nightfall, climbing restricted structures, entering a temple, and promoting Feastables products in violation of guidelines for tourists and commercial shoots. Donaldson countered that his team held "full permits" and followed the rules, but President Claudia Sheinbaum requested a review of how the permits were granted.

=== Lawsuit by former employee ===
In April 2026, he was sued by former employee Lorrayne Mavromatis, who accused his company of years of sexual harassment, gender discrimination, and wrongful termination after she became a mother. She also accused the company of demeaning treatment. Donaldson denied these allegations.

== Personal life ==
Donaldson has described himself as an introvert, saying his focus on YouTube leaves little time for a social life. His mother, Sue, linked that temperament to the family's frequent moves and to his ongoing experience with Crohn's disease.

He dated YouTuber Maddy Spidell from 2019 to 2022, and he began a relationship with gaming streamer Thea Booysen later that year. Donaldson announced his engagement to Booysen on January 1, 2025, after proposing to her on December 25, 2024. On July 11, 2026, Donaldson announced on social media that he "may or may not be getting married". On July 21, he confirmed the marriage by posting wedding photos on social media. The pair got married on Necker Island, a private island in the British Virgin Islands owned by English business magnate Richard Branson.

After the implosion of the OceanGate submersible Titan during a June 2023 expedition to the Titanic, Donaldson said he had been invited on the trip but declined.

=== Political views ===
Donaldson says he remains apolitical because taking sides could alienate viewers and undermine his philanthropic work. During a September 2022 podcast appearance, he joked that he might run for president "in like 20 years", arguing that the United States is "due for younger presidents". On July 6, 2024, amid the 2024 campaign, he tweeted, "If we lower the age to run for president I'll jump in the race", a remark that went viral before he clarified on X that he was simply restating his apolitical stance. However, he is a supporter of Elon Musk, as stated an interview with Theo Von on December 3, 2024.

==== LGBT issues ====
In an April 2022 interview with Rolling Stone, Donaldson said he had left evangelical Christianity, now identifies as an agnostic theist, and no longer shares the anti-LGBTQ positions he heard while growing up in the Bible Belt. He recalled being taught that "Gay people are the reason God's going to come and burn this Earth" and said he has since rejected the rhetoric.

The Atlantic reported in May 2018 that Donaldson used homophobic slurs on Twitter as a teenager, often treating the word "gay" as an insult. He later deleted those posts, and a spokesperson said in 2021 that he had "grown up and matured into someone that doesn't speak like that".

Donaldson publicly supported childhood friend and collaborator Ava Kris Tyson in April 2023 after she revealed that she was receiving feminizing hormone replacement therapy, writing, "All this transphobia is starting to piss me off." Tyson later came out as a trans woman.

== Public image and influence ==
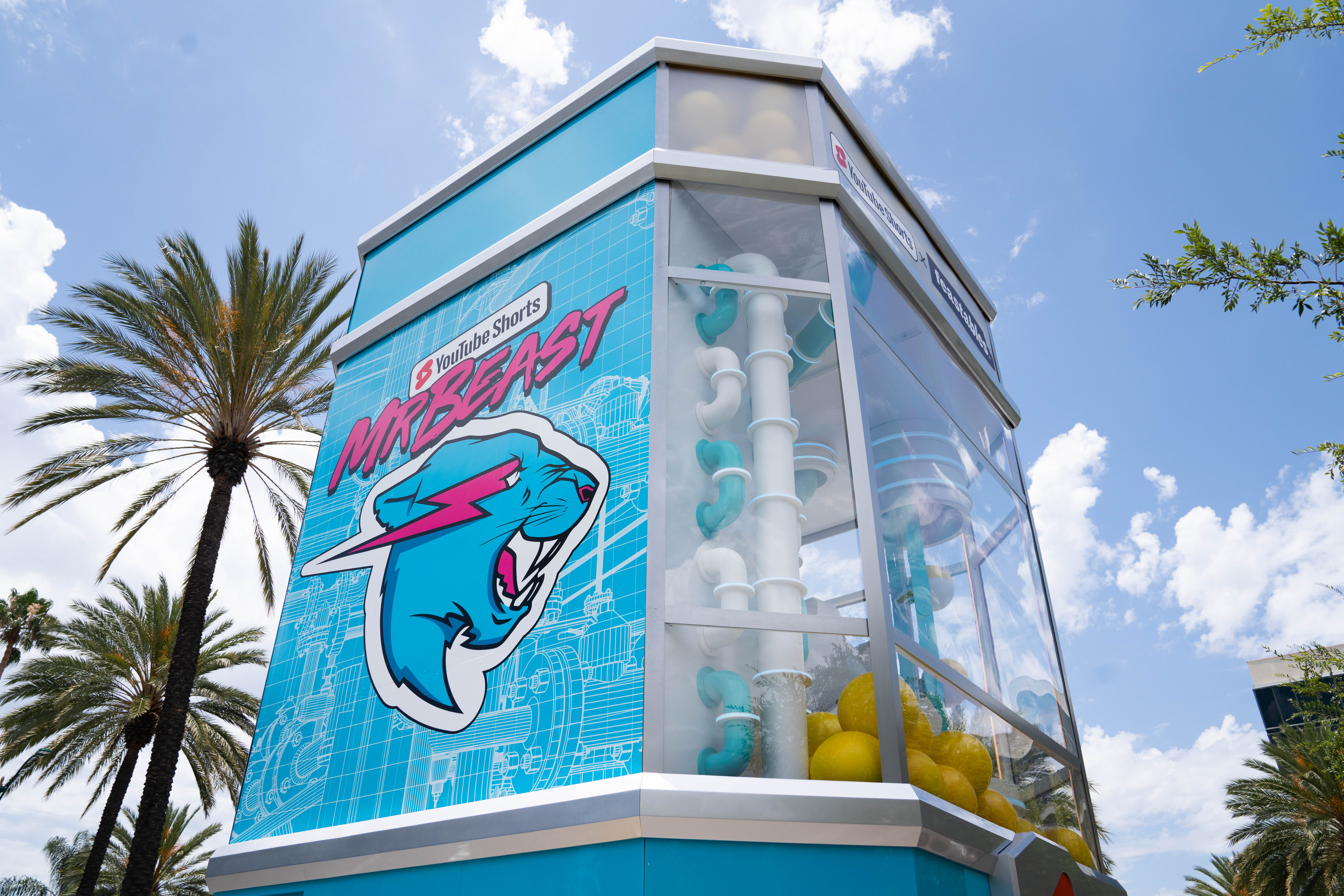
MrBeast's large model gumball machine at VidCon 2022

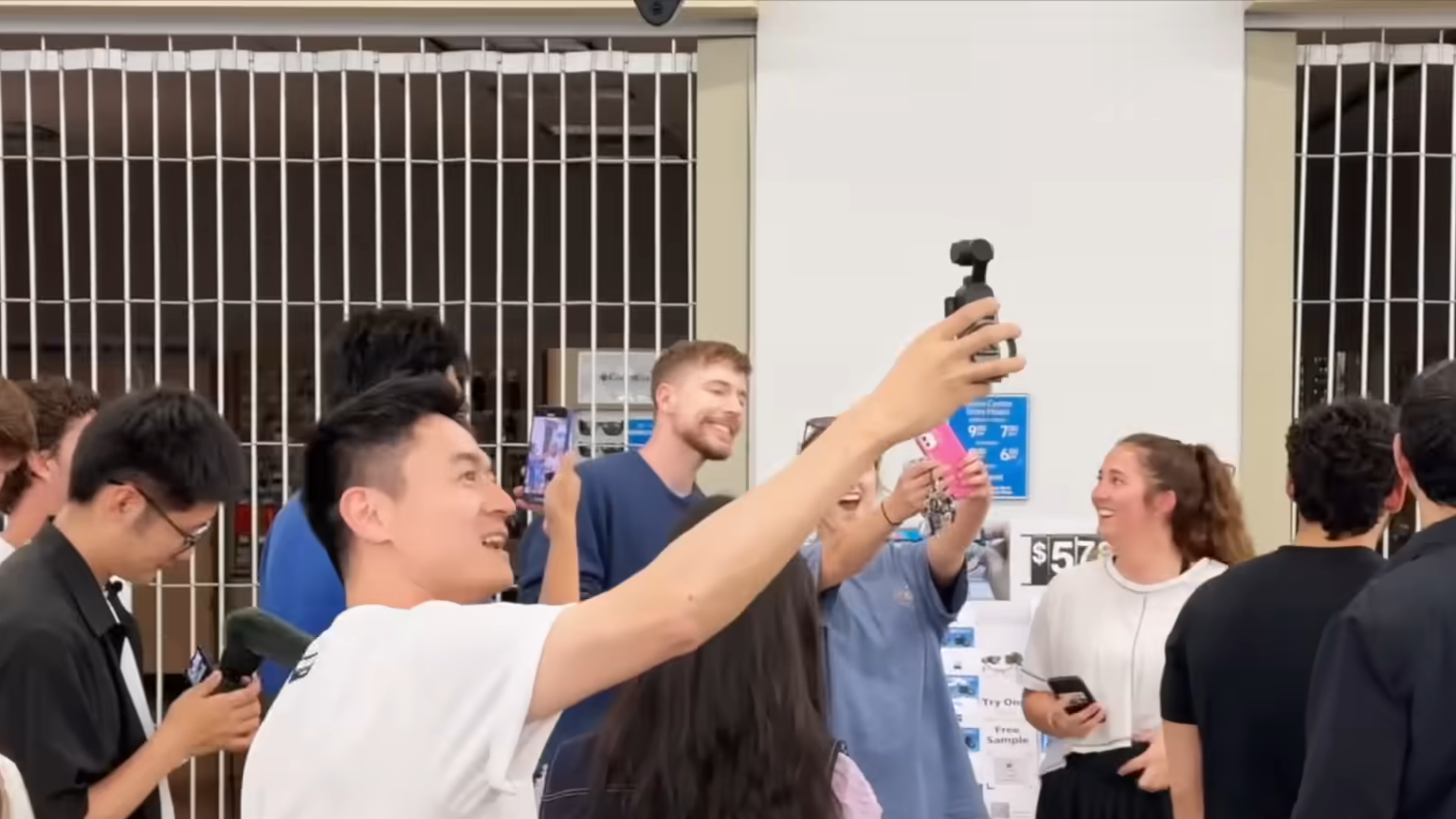
Fans of MrBeast photographing him at a Walmart in 2025

Donaldson's channel became the most subscribed on YouTube on June 2, 2024, when it overtook T-Series. A February 2021 poll by Insider reported that 70% of respondents viewed him favorably and 12% unfavorably. Coverage from Time, Yahoo Life, and CNN has noted his particular appeal to younger audiences, pointing to his direct-to-camera delivery and polished but enthusiastic on-screen persona, which could encourage a parasocial relationship.

Writers such as Charissa Cheong have linked Donaldson's success to a broader shift on YouTube toward high-budget, experimental productions. Other analysts have credited his format with influencing creators such as Fidias, Matthew Beem, and Airrack, who have adopted similar high-stakes challenge videos. Donaldson's influence on entertainment has been deemed "Mr. Beastification" and "Beastification" by observers. Taylor Lorenz noted in March 2024 that Donaldson's style of "retention editing" involved "loud sound effects, fast cuts, flashing lights and zero pauses" to keep users' attention. This style was mimicked by many other content creators to the point of being the dominant format, though its dominance was beginning to wane by then; Donaldson wanted himself and others to "get rid of the ultra fast paced/overstim era of content". Anthony Padilla of Smosh felt that MrBeastification had led to a large number of copycats and "this very heavy desire for people to really get caught up in the stats".

Donaldson's approach on charity has also drawn scrutiny. Commentators have accused Donaldson of turning philanthropy into spectacle, sometimes describing his videos as "charity porn". Critics have argued that his giveaways do little to address structural inequality. Donaldson has responded that he does not profit from Beast Philanthropy videos, that all revenue is donated, and that government action is needed to solve systemic problems.

Donaldson has been under scrutiny regarding his employees' working conditions. Former employees have accused Donaldson of fostering a difficult workplace. Editor Matt Turner told The New York Times that while he worked for Donaldson between February 2018 and September 2019 he was berated almost daily, called a "retard", and often left uncredited for his edits. Insider reported that Turner described the same allegations in a 2018 video and in an October 2019 Twitter thread. Another editor, Nate Anderson, said he left after one week in 2018 because of what he viewed as unreasonable expectations and later received death threats from fans after sharing his experience. Nine additional former employees similarly stated that Donaldson could be generous but that his demeanor shifted when the cameras were off. Donaldson rejected the accusations, saying that the company maintains high standards without being toxic, and he said he paid Turner $10,000 and recommended him for another job when his contract ended.

== Filmography ==
=== Films ===
Film
Year	Title	Role	Notes	Ref.
2022	Night of the Coconut	Himself	Cameo; credited as "Jimothy Beast"	
2023	Teenage Mutant Ninja Turtles: Mutant Mayhem	Times Square Bystander	Voice	
2023	Under the Boardwalk	Hot Sauce Crab	Voice	
2024	The Sidemen Story	Himself	Documentary	
2024	Kung Fu Panda 4	Panda Pig	Voice	
2026	The Angry Birds Movie 3 †	TBA	Voice	

=== Television ===
Television
Year	Title	Role	Notes	Ref.
2024–present	Beast Games	Host	20 episodes; also co-creator and executive producer	
2025	Love, Death & Robots	Master of ceremonies	Voice; episode: "The Screaming of the Tyrannosaur"	
2026	Survivor	Guest	Season 50; episode 10	
2026	Shark Tank	Himself	Season 18, episode 1	

=== Music videos ===
Film
Year	Title	Artist	Director	Role	Ref.
2025	"Type Dangerous"	Mariah Carey	Joseph Kahn	Himself	

== Bibliography ==
- Donaldson, James Stephen; Patterson, James Brendan (September 1, 2026). The Most Dangerous Games. William Morrow and Company. ISBN 978-0063488762.

== Awards and nominations ==
Year	Ceremony	Category	Result	Ref.
2019	9th Streamy Awards	Breakout Creator	Won	
2019	9th Streamy Awards	Ensemble Cast	Nominated	
2019	9th Streamy Awards	Creator of the Year	Nominated	
2020	12th Annual Shorty Awards	YouTuber of the Year	Won	
2020	10th Streamy Awards	Creator of the Year	Won	
2020	10th Streamy Awards	Live Special	Won	
2020	10th Streamy Awards	Social Good: Creator	Won	
2020	10th Streamy Awards	Social Good: Nonprofit or NGO	Won	
2021	2021 Kids' Choice Awards	Favorite Male Social Star	Nominated	
2021	11th Streamy Awards	Creator of the Year	Won	
2022	2022 Kids' Choice Awards	Favorite Male Creator	Won	
2022	12th Streamy Awards	Creator of the Year	Won	
2022	12th Streamy Awards	Collaboration	Nominated	
2022	12th Streamy Awards	Social Good: Creator (Note: As Team Seas)	Won	
2022	12th Streamy Awards	Creator Product	Nominated	
2022	12th Streamy Awards	Editing	Nominated	
2022	12th Streamy Awards	Brand Engagement	Won	
2022	12th Streamy Awards	Social Impact Campaign	Nominated	
2023	2023 Kids' Choice Awards	Favorite Male Creator	Won	
2023	13th Streamy Awards	Creator of the Year	Won	
2023	13th Streamy Awards	Collaboration	Won	
2023	13th Streamy Awards	Creator Product	Nominated	
2023	13th Streamy Awards	Brand Engagement	Nominated	
2024	2024 Kids' Choice Awards	Favorite Male Creator	Won	
2025	2025 Kids' Choice Awards	Favorite Male Creator	Won	
2026	2026 Kids' Choice Awards	Favorite Male Creator	Won	

=== Publications ===
Year	Publication	Category	Ref.
2021	Forbes 30 Under 30	Social Media	
2022	Guinness World Records	Largest vegetarian burger	
2023	Guinness World Records	First person to reach 1 million followers on Threads	
2023	Guinness World Records	Highest-earning YouTube contributor (current)	
2023	Guinness World Records	Most YouTube subscribers gained in one week	
2024	Guinness World Records	Most subscribers on YouTube	

== See also ==
- List of most-followed TikTok accounts
- List of most-viewed YouTube channels
- List of YouTubers
- Night – American talent management company that previously managed MrBeast

== Notes ==
Achievements
Preceded by T-Series	Most Subscribed Channel on YouTube; 2024–Present	Succeeded by N/A
