= Beast Land =

Temporary theme park in Riyadh, Saudi Arabia

- Location: Riyadh, Saudi Arabia
- Coordinates: 24.7783152°N 46.6093588°E
- Status: Defunct
- Opened: 13 November 2025
- Closed: 27 December 2025
- Owner: Riyadh Season / General Entertainment Authority
- Operated by: Riyadh Season
- Theme: MrBeast challenge-style games and attractions
- Area: 188,000 square metres (2,020,000 sq ft)

Attractions
- Total: 15
- Roller coasters: 2

Beast Land was a temporary theme park in Riyadh, Saudi Arabia. It was created by American YouTube personality Jimmy Donaldson, known as MrBeast, and opened on 13 November 2025 as part of Riyadh Season 2025. The park operated from 13 November 2025 until it closed 45 days later on 27 December 2025.

== Overview ==
Beast Land was located near Boulevard City and Boulevard World, two major zones of Riyadh Season. The park covered 188,000 square metres (2,020,000 sq ft) and included rides, games, and challenge-based attractions inspired by MrBeast's online videos. The project was part of Saudi Arabia's Vision 2030 program, which aims to increase tourism in Saudi Arabia.

The park featured more than 15 rides and 14 "experiences", including roller coasters, thrill rides, family attractions, carnival games, food stalls, and merchandise areas. It also had a competition arena featuring physical challenge games focused on speed and precision, such as "Tower Siege", "Battle Bridge", and "Warrior Challenge".

== Reception ==
Media outlets reported large crowds during the opening, with fans gathering to see Donaldson and try the challenge-based games.
