= Feastables =

Chocolate and snack brand by MrBeast

Feastables Inc.
- Logo used since 2024

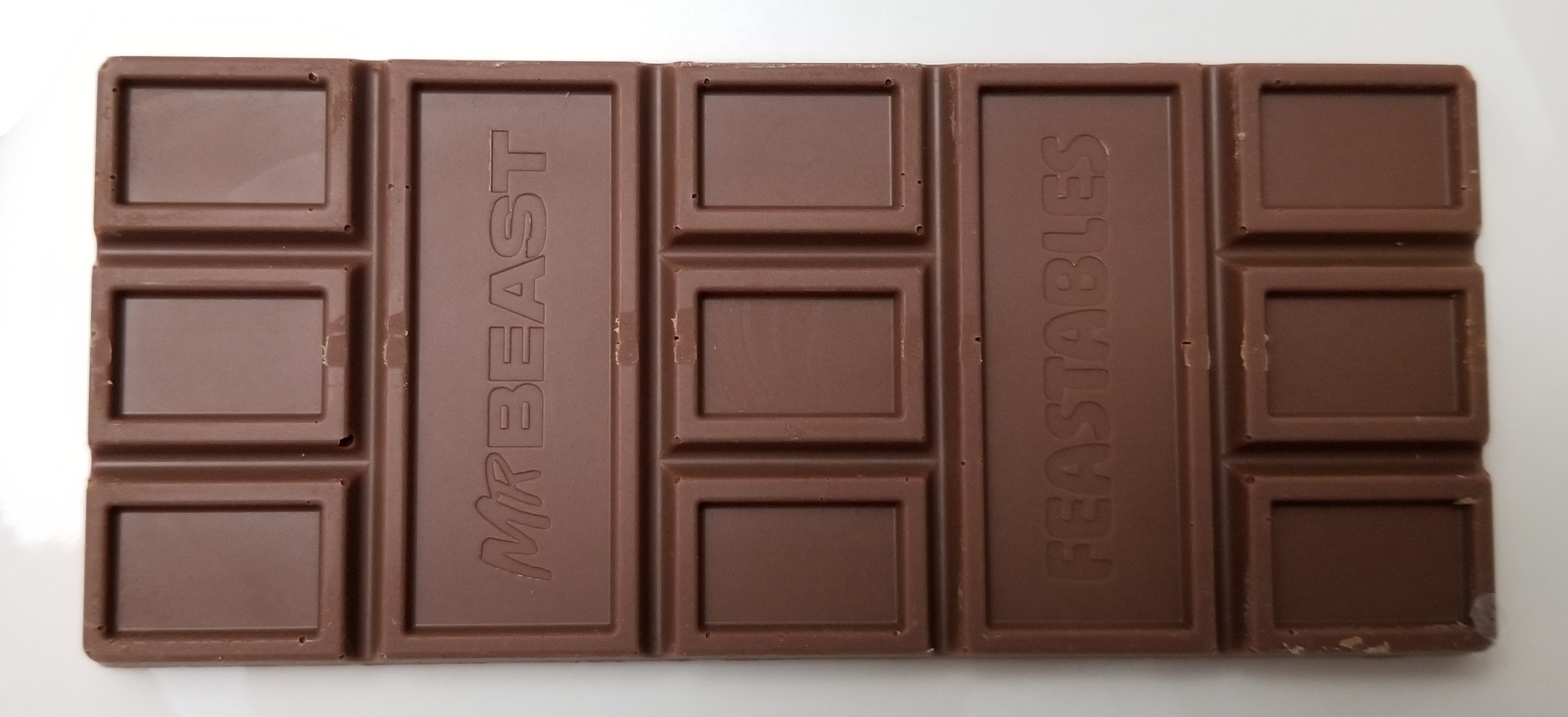
- The third and current version of the Feastables milk chocolate bar
- Type: Private
- Industry: Food processing
- Founded: July 8, 2021; 5 years ago
- Founder: Jimmy Donaldson; Jim Murray
- Headquarters: United States
- Number of locations: (2023)
- Area served: List of areas: Australia; Austria; Belgium; Canada; Costa Rica; Czech Republic; Ecuador; Denmark; France; Germany; Hong Kong; Iceland; India; Ireland; Lithuania; Kuwait; Malaysia; Mexico; Netherlands; New Zealand; Panama; Peru; Philippines; Poland; Qatar; Russia; South Africa; Spain; Turkey; Thailand; Uruguay; United Kingdom; United States; United Arab Emirates
- Key people: Jim Murray (CEO)
- Products: Chocolate bars; Cookies; Gummy candy; Chocolate milk
- Website: feastables.com

Feastables Inc. is a chocolate and snack brand created by American YouTuber Jimmy Donaldson, better known as MrBeast. In January 2022, Donaldson announced the creation of his company which launched its own brand of chocolate bars called "MrBeast Bar". Feastables' chocolate products are manufactured in Peru by Machu Picchu Foods SAC.

== History ==
In 2021, Jimmy "MrBeast" Donaldson involved Jim Murray, formerly the president of Rxbar, in the creation of Feastables. Murray subsequently became a co-founder and the CEO of the company. The company was incorporated on July 8, 2021.

The launch was accompanied by a sweepstakes campaign offering over $1 million in prizes. Ten grand prize winners were offered the opportunity to compete for a chocolate factory in a future MrBeast video, referencing Charlie and the Chocolate Factory. The video, released in June 2022, featured Gordon Ramsay as a cake judge and included a $500,000 cash prize. Competitive eaters Matt Stonie and Joey Chestnut made appearances in the video. On February 2, 2022, Feastables announced partnerships with Turtle Beach Corporation and Roccat to provide prizes for the sweepstakes. In its initial months, Feastables reportedly achieved $10 million in chocolate bar sales.

In March 2023, Donaldson faced criticism after asking fans on Twitter to "clean up" Feastables displays in stores, offering entry into a $5,000 raffle for providing proof. This prompted accusations of exploiting fans for unpaid labor.

Initially available at Walmart, Feastables expanded to other retail locations in May 2023. The brand was launched in the UK in July 2023 and expanded to Australia and New Zealand in September 2023. Expansion into South Africa occurred in October 2023.

On October 2, 2023, Feastables entered into a partnership with the Charlotte Hornets, becoming their official jersey patch sponsor for the 2023–24 NBA season and introducing a new logo. This partnership has since ended.

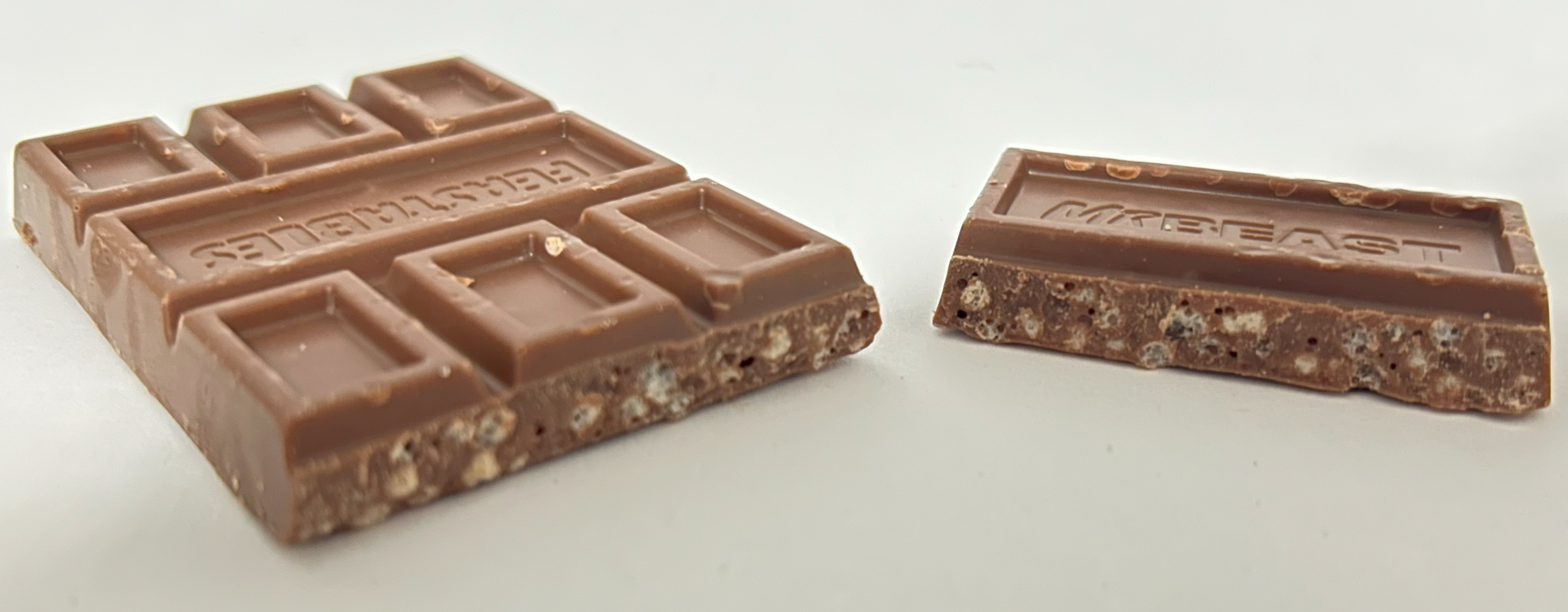
A Feastables milk crunch bar

In February 2024, Feastables introduced a new logo on its product packaging, and the formulation of the chocolate bar was revised. The "MrBeast Bar" name was discontinued, and the "Deez Nutz" flavor was renamed "Peanut Butter" following a legal claim by the peanut company "Dee's Nuts".

In April 2024, Feastables expanded its distribution to Canada. In May 2024, the brand began sales in the European Union, initially in Denmark and the Netherlands. Distribution expanded to Germany in September 2024. The brand was launched in India in November 2024.

In September 2024, Feastables became a partner in Tony's Open Chain.

In February 2025, Feastables announced it had received kosher certification from OU Kosher. In July 2025, it was announced that celebrity chef Nick DiGiovanni had partnered with the company as an official brand partner. Feastables also began to be sold in Russia in the Pyaterochka chain. Before that, they could be purchased on the Wildberries and Ozon marketplaces.

== See also ==
- MrBeast Burger
- Lunchly
