= Ohio Valley–style pizza =

Style of pizza

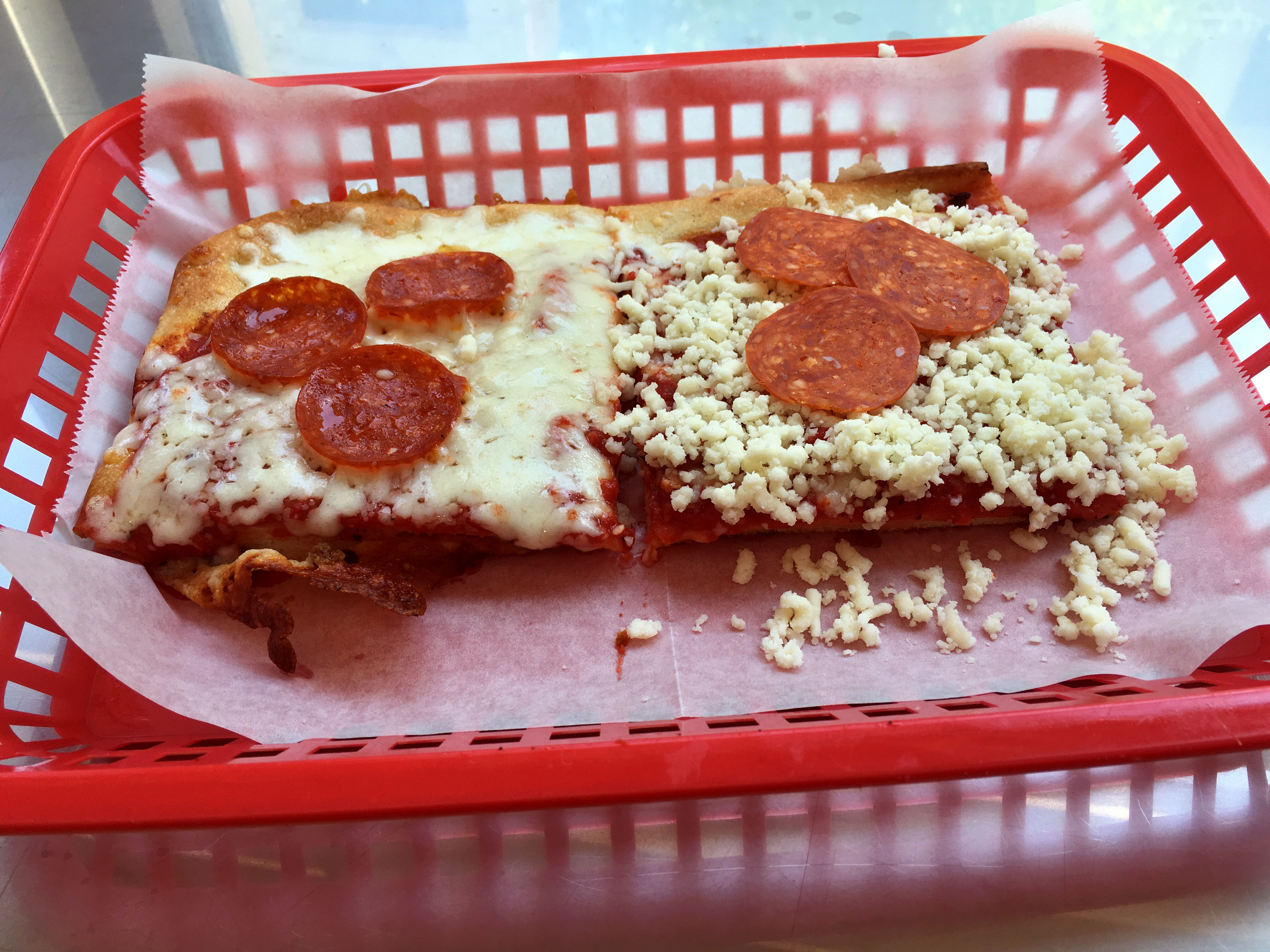
- One slice (right) of Ohio Valley style pizza from DiCarlo's pizza in Pennsylvania
- Type: Pizza
- Place of origin: Steubenville, Ohio, U.S.
- Created by: Primo DiCarlo
- Main ingredients: Pizza dough, tomato sauce, shredded cheese

Ohio Valley–style pizza is a pizza made with cold toppings sprinkled over a square crust that has been covered with a savory or sweet tomato sauce. It originated in Steubenville, Ohio, United States, and is served in parts of Ohio, Pennsylvania and West Virginia, mostly in and near the Ohio Valley region of those states.

== History ==
Ohio Valley–style pizza was invented in Steubenville, Ohio, by Primo DiCarlo when he returned to the United States after serving in World War II. DiCarlo had eaten pizza in Italy during the war, and attempted to recreate it in the United States. In 1945 he opened the Original DiCarlo's Famous Pizza Shop with his parents Michael and Caroline, Italian immigrants who had opened up bakeries in Ohio and California. Their shop was the first licensed pizza restaurant in Ohio. They opened a second location in Wheeling, West Virginia, four years later. They subsequently opened locations in Weirton, Glen Dale, and Wellsburg, West Virginia. A 1949 article in the Wheeling News Register described their pizza as "an Italian bread dough base garnished with a sauce of tomatoes, parsley and green peppers that's seasoned with oregano, served with anchovies, cheese, pepperoni or mushrooms."

The pizza is known for its distinctive cold toppings which are added after the pizza is cooked. It was nicknamed "The Poor Man's Cheesecake" in the 1940s. The reasons for this style are uncertain; in 2018, Anna DiCarlo, niece of Primo DiCarlo, speculated that the pizza may have originally been prepared in this way to avoid burning the toppings. The style became a part of local cuisine in Ohio and West Virginia, and was replicated by several other chains. However, its method of preparation is polarizing, and it has been negatively compared to Lunchables.

== Description ==
Ohio Valley pizza is characterized by a square crust topped with a savory or sweet sauce and baked in a rectangular sheet pan at around 550 degrees Fahrenheit. The sauce used on an Ohio Valley-style pizza is either a savory or sweet, lightly seasoned tomato sauce made with green bell peppers, oregano and olive oil. The sauce may be cooked or uncooked before spreading.

It is removed halfway through baking and topped with additional sauce and small amounts of cheese. The cooked pizza is then topped with cold ingredients including shredded Provolone cheese and often pepperoni or banana peppers. The cheese melts slightly due to the heat of the pizza but the other toppings remain uncooked.

The pizza is cut into square slices, and served by the slice. Some restaurants allow customers to purchase additional shredded cheese in a bag to sprinkle on top of their pizza.
