= Más+ =

Sports and energy drinks by Lionel Messi

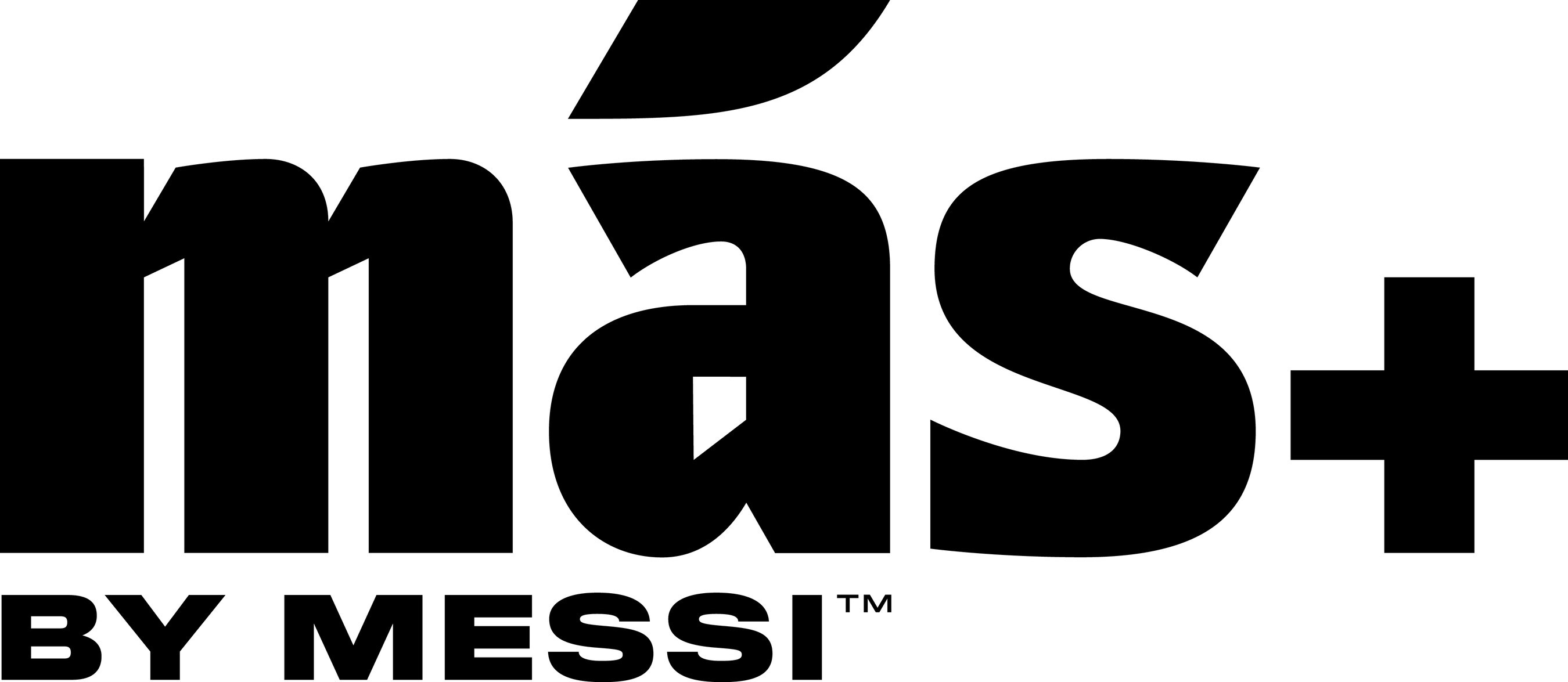
- Type: Sports drink, energy drink
- Manufacturer: White Claw Hard Seltzer and Más+ Next Generation Beverage Co.
- Distributor: White Claw Hard Seltzer and Más+ Next Generation Beverage Co.
- Origin: United States
- Introduced: June 13, 2024; 2 years ago
- Discontinued: January 2026
- Website: masbymessi.com

Más+, or Más+ by Messi, was an American brand of sports and energy drinks created and marketed by Más+ Next Generation Beverage Co. It was founded by professional soccer player Lionel Messi and debuted in Miami, Florida, on June 13, 2024. Más+ is affiliated with White Claw Hard Seltzer. In January 2026, Mark Anthony Brands announced that Más+ has been discontinued.

== Products ==
The drink contains a mix of four electrolytes: sodium, magnesium, potassium, and calcium, six vitamins: B3, B6, B12, A, C, and E, five minerals: sodium, calcium, zinc, potassium, and magnesium, three antioxidants: C, E, and A, and natural flavors. It has no artificial sweeteners, colors, or caffeine. The 16.9-ounce bottles contain 10 calories and 1 g of sucrose per 500 ml, while the 12-ounce bottles contain 7 calories and less than 1 g of sucrose per 355 ml.

The flavors of Más+ are named after events in Messi's life. Más+ Miami Punch refers to his tenure with Inter Miami CF. Más+ Orange d'Or references his eight Ballon d'Or awards. Más+ Berry Copa Crush reflects his seven Copa del Rey titles with FC Barcelona and two Copa América titles with Argentina. Más+ Limón Lime League refers to his participation in the UEFA Champions League.

== History ==
On June 4, 2024, Lionel Messi announced the launch of Más+ on his Instagram. The drink debuted in Miami, Florida, on June 13, 2024, and became available in Publix and Walmart stores, as well as for delivery on Gopuff in South Florida the next day. On July 17, 2024, Messi announced that Más+ would launch in Canada on August 15 at Toronto's Soccer Headquarters, Café Diplomatico, in partnership with The Mark Anthony Group.

The product was designed to provide a flavorful and healthy hydration option that met Messi's preferences. He explained that "Many flavored drinks have high levels of unhealthy ingredients, so people who drink them consume more sugar, calories, artificial ingredients, and even caffeine than they realize."

The name "más," meaning "more" in Spanish, was selected to reflect his career and his commitment to giving to others, with the plus symbol representing positivity.

== Reception ==
Andrea Hernández, founder of Snaxshot, notes that attaching Messi's name to the product does not automatically ensure its success. George Shaw of GlobalData states, "The decision to launch a functional sports drink rather than entering the fast-growing energy drinks space is likely to avoid limiting the potential customer base to older teenage groups." Shaw suggests that Messi's decision to create a healthier drink may have been influenced by recent criticism of Prime's energy-drink range for its high caffeine content, leading to its restriction in Denmark. Online reception has also criticized the resemblance of the bottles to Prime's designs.

=== Prime Hydration lawsuit ===
On 20 November 2024, Prime Hydration filed a countersuit against The Mark Anthony Group and Más+ by Messi, alleging that the drink infringes on Prime's trademark. The lawsuit cited similarities in the bottle design and tagline, and claimed that the product's design led to anti-competitive practices, arguing that consumers were confusing the two beverages. According to an October lawsuit filed by Mark Anthony International, Prime Hydration purported that Más+ violated its trade dress. Prime Hydration requested for Mark Anthony International to change the bottle design and tagline to eliminate any potential confusion between the products. Prime also sought compensation for damages caused by the infringement and requested a portion of the revenue generated from the sales of the current bottles.
