= The Most Dangerous Games =

2026 novel by MrBeast and James Patterson

- First edition
- Author: MrBeast; James Patterson
- Audio read by: Nolan North
- Cover artist: Zoë van Dijk
- Language: English
- Genre: Thriller; dystopia
- Publisher: William Morrow and Company
- Publication date: September 1, 2026
- Publication place: United States
- Media type: Print (hardback & paperback)
- Pages: 480 (first edition)
- ISBN: 978-0063488762
- Dewey Decimal: 813.6
- Website: themostdangerousgames.com

The Most Dangerous Games is a thriller and dystopian novel by YouTuber MrBeast and author James Patterson. It was published on September 1, 2026, by William Morrow and Company, an imprint of HarperCollins. The book debuted at #3 on The New York Times Best Seller list for hardcover fiction.

== Plot ==
Jimmy Donaldson, also known as MrBeast, is hired by a secret organization searching for "The One", a leader they believe can save humanity. Jimmy uses his influence to draw one thousand contestants from around the world to Ohio for interviews, and is unexpectedly selected to compete himself. The Host announces that select contestants will take part in a series of dangerous games, with the winner receiving a $1 billion reward. He describes the games as deadly, and anyone may quit at any time.

The first game sent some contestants to Ross Island in Antarctica, where they are attacked by orcas and tasked with exploring unstable ice caves. Other contestants are flown to an island at the southernmost point of Chile, where they navigate shark-infested water and hike up a mountain inhabited by venomous snakes and spiders. Contestants quit or fail, and one contestant dies due to a spider bite.

The remaining contestants are brought to Kentucky, where Jimmy disavows the games, explaining he did not expect them to be lethal. Two contestants, Wyatt and Hannah, explore a mutual attraction and they kiss, an event that is monitored by The Host.

In advance of the second game, each participant is tasked with competing against an artificial intelligence in one of four board games: chess, checkers, Go, or Scrabble. Despite universal failure, thirty participants advance after the test is revealed to measure creativity. A contestant named Tipton is tapped by The Host to act as a stooge for the rest of the games.

The second game sends contestants in groups to Death Valley, Mount Washington, and Mammoth Cave, and two more die. Later, in Maine, The Host reveals himself and explains that the games are being run by a board of directors. The third game sends contestants to an active war zone with the task of rescuing civilians; two more die. The fourth game takes place in Tuscany, where the remaining contestants are paired off to duel. Hannah defeats her ally Jack but quits, and Wyatt quits after learning she has left. The remaining contestants are brought to the Burj Khalifa, where they are bribed to quit the games. Wyatt rejoins the group and reveals that he is the grandson of the games' founder, Gavin Hillshire. Wyatt takes control of the games from The Host, who is revealed to be his father, Ward. It is explained that Hillshire has died, leaving Wyatt as his heir.

Wyatt explains he is under a legal obligation to continue the games. The final contestants are placed in individualized torture rooms designed to trigger their worst fears through hallucination. Alek, a university student, is the only contestant who perseveres, and she is declared to be "The One". Jimmy arrives and brings Alek, Jack, and another contestant Khi to the penthouse, where Wyatt is waiting with Hannah. They follow Wyatt to a boardroom where he reveals that the Board tried to rig the games to choose someone they could control: Tipton. Alek fires the Board, and leaves with her allies to celebrate and plan for the future.

In the epilogue, Ward tells Alek that another series of games has just ended elsewhere in the world, and explains that she is not the only person deemed to be "The One".

== Writing ==
The book is credited to author James Patterson and YouTuber Jimmy Donaldson, known as MrBeast, who were introduced after MrBeast became interested in writing a novel. They met at MrBeast's studio in Greenville, North Carolina, to discuss various potential story ideas. They began outlining a story based upon the premise of a deadly version of the Beast Games competition show, in which people participate in challenges to win money. MrBeast is also known for producing YouTube videos in which he hosts competitions. The novel features a fictionalized version of MrBeast and a deadly competition to win $1 billion.

MrBeast compared the book's structure to the Odyssey, which is about a series of adventures at different places visited by a protagonist on a dangerous journey. Patterson reportedly mentored MrBeast in the craft of writing, and they met on a weekly basis to draft and edit the novel together.

Patterson and MrBeast intended to write a novel that would appeal to both children and adults. When the book was announced, MrBeast released a statement saying that he hoped the book would make younger generations interested in reading. MrBeast stated that he believed books were "boring" until he was in his twenties, only changing his mind after reading Steve Jobs by Walter Isaacson and The Goal by Eliyahu M. Goldratt.

ABC News described the book's title as an homage to "The Most Dangerous Game", a 1924 short story by Richard Connell. However, in an interview with USA Today, MrBeast said that the similarity was a coincidence and that he had not read Connell's story.

== Publication ==
On March 27, 2025, Deadline reported that there was an eight-figure bidding war over the novel's television and film adaptation rights. HarperCollins ultimately won the bidding war, which would be published under its William Morrow and Company imprint. It was reported that the book would be published in 15 languages in 2026. In June 2026, the book's official title and cover were revealed, and it became available for pre-order. A trailer for the book was published on June 18, 2026. The novel was published on September 1, 2026, by William Morrow and Company. An audiobook version of the novel is narrated by Nolan North and also features MrBeast.

MrBeast and Patterson both promoted the book on social media, and appeared together on the morning news program Good Morning America to discuss it. On July 17, 2026, MrBeast uploaded a YouTube short titled, "Read My Book, You Could Win $1,000,000." As part of the contest, the book's readers can participate in weekly challenges based on clues in the book to win a $1,000,000 prize.

== Reception ==
Prior to the novel's release, Matt Patches of Polygon and Alexander Larman of The Spectator each compared its premise to The Hunger Games and The Running Man. Imogen West-Knights of Slate gave the book a negative review, describing it as "very easy to read, nothing left implicit, plot-heavy, broken up into short chapters, superficial in its themes and characters." However, she noted that it did have potential to engage teenagers in reading. It was well received by The Times.

The book debuted at #3 in the Hardcover Fiction category on the The New York Times Best Seller list, and reached #2 on Amazon's new releases list, and #9 on USA Today's bestseller list. The day before the book's release, it was at #18 on Amazon's new releases list, and #1 on its mystery novels list. The Hollywood Reporter reported that it had low pre-order sales, "numbering in the four digits". On September 1, IGN reported that pre-order sales were higher than had been previously estimated and the book was "tracking well for a debut novel".
