= Lunchables =

Brand of food manufactured by Kraft Foods

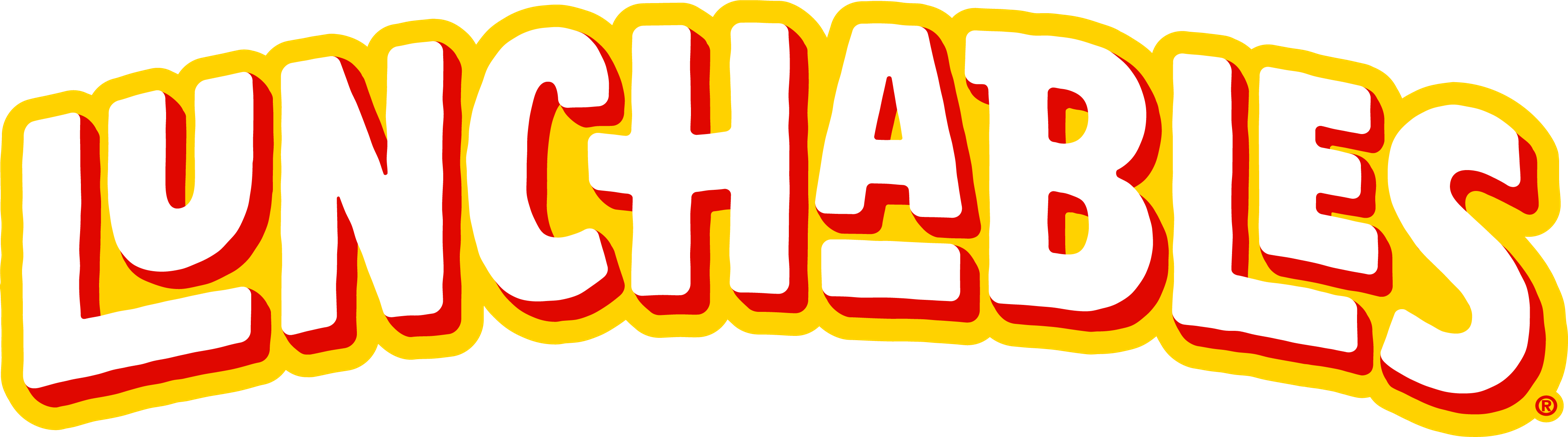

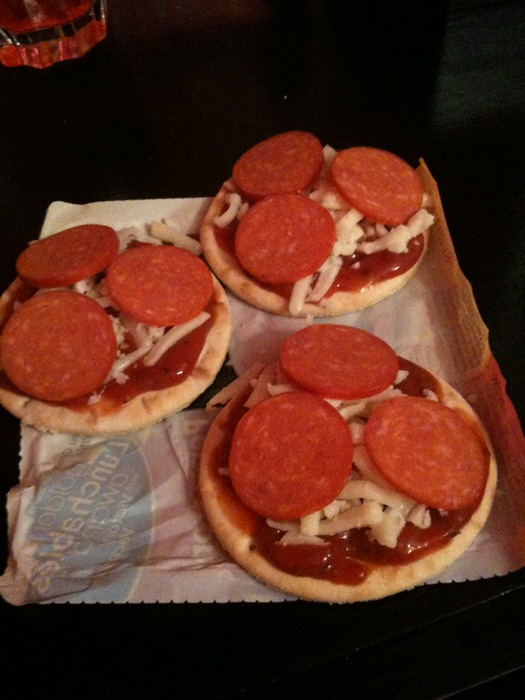
- The "Pizza with Pepperoni" variety, after being assembled by the consumer
- Product type: Snack, children's meal
- Current owner: Kraft Heinz
- Produced by: Oscar Mayer
- Country: United States
- Introduced: 1987; 39 years ago
- Related brands: Lunch Mates
- Website: lunchables.com

Lunchables is an American brand of food and snacks manufactured by Kraft Heinz in Chicago, Illinois, and marketed under the Oscar Mayer brand. They were initially test marketed in Eau Claire, WI & Grand Junction, CO in the fall of 1987 before being released nationally in 1988.

In the United Kingdom and Ireland, Lunchables were originally marketed by Kraft Foods Inc. and its successor Mondelez as "Dairylea Lunchables". In 2023, Mondelez renamed the line "Dairylea Lunchers".

== History ==
Lunchables was designed in 1985 by Bob Drane as a way for Oscar Mayer to sell more bologna and other lunch meat.

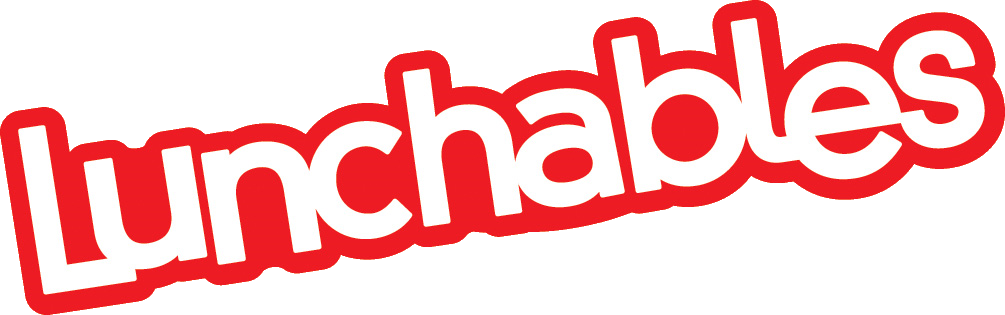
Logo used from 2013 to 2022

After organizing focus groups of American mothers, Drane discovered that their primary concern was time. Working mothers, especially, were pressed by the time constraints of making breakfast for their families as well as packing lunch for their children to eat at school. This gave Drane the idea of creating a convenient prepackaged lunch featuring Oscar Mayer's trademark lunch meats. Crackers were substituted for bread because they would last longer in grocery coolers. The cheese was provided by Kraft when Oscar Mayer merged with Kraft in 1988. The design of the package was based on the look of an American TV dinner.

The term 'Lunchables' emerged from a list of possible names for the prepackaged meal that included, among others: On-Trays, Crackerwiches, Mini Meals, Lunch Kits, Snackables, Square Meals, Walk Meals, Go-Packs, and Fun Mealz.

== Combinations ==
Lunchables offers 30 different kinds of meal variety combinations, which include crackers, pizzas, chicken nuggets, small hot dogs, small burgers, nachos, subs, and wraps. A typical package, such as the cracker meal combination, contains an equal number of crackers and small slices of meat and cheese. The brand also created two versions targeting adults, by increasing the amount of food offered in each package, but these have since been discontinued. The first was called the "Deluxe" and contained two types of meats and cheeses, as well as a mustard condiment and a mint. The second version, called "Maxed Out" (originally "Mega Packs"), was available with 40% more food than a regular Lunchables.

Lunchables also carries an assortment of drinks and desserts. In certain meal combinations, Capri-Sun juice drinks are offered, either in a traditional flavor or the "Roarin' Waters" variant. Other drinks included are bottled water and a generic, unlabeled small can of cola; however, it was later replaced with Capri Sun drinks due to health concerns. As for dessert, some packages contain Jell-O gelatin or pudding or a candy alternative, such as Butterfingers or Reese's cups. Other desserts also include Oreos, chocolate chip cookies, and vanilla cookies.

As of 2022, the varieties of Lunchables (as they were then known) available in the UK were more limited in comparison to the 1990s and 2000s. The burger, pizza, hot dog, and sub varieties were no longer sold, and the product was mostly limited to crackers, cheese, and ham or chicken although there was a Snackers brand of cheese and crackers with Cadbury Buttons, mini Fingers or Oreos. Many varieties, including turkey, ham, sausage, hot dogs, and pizza, are still sold in Canada, but they are sold by Maple Leaf Foods under the name "Lunch Mate".

A line of trays called Maxed Out was eventually released and had as many as nine grams of saturated fat, or nearly an entire day's recommended maximum for children, with up to two-thirds of the maximum for sodium and 65 grams (13 tsp) of sugar. Regarding the shift toward more salt, sugar, and fat in meals for kids, Geoffrey Bible, former CEO of Philip Morris USA (prior owner of Kraft Foods), remarked that he read an article that said: "If you take Lunchables apart, the most healthy item in it is the napkin."

== Controversy ==
In 1997, Lunchables came under fire for having high saturated fat and sodium content while being marketed as a healthy children's meal. For example, a single serving of Ham and Swiss Lunchables contained 1,780 milligrams of sodium, which is 74% of the recommended daily allowance for an adult.

Due to the growing concern of childhood obesity, UK Lunchables opted to create healthier options for children by eliminating Capri Sun drinks and mini Daim bars and replacing the sugary drink and candy with orange juice and strawberry yogurt in 2004. The brand also began offering lower-calorie candy alternatives rather than including the standard Reese's cup in the package. Capri Sun and candy are still available as options in U.S. Lunchables. Lunchables were listed among the Cancer Project's "Five Worst Packaged Lunchbox Meals" in 2009.

A 2024 report by Consumer Reports found a high concentration of lead and phthalates (a chemical family known for causing hormone disruption) as well as high levels of sodium in Lunchables products. Consumer Reports asked the USDA to remove Lunchables products from the National School Lunch Program. In November of that year, resulting from the Consumer Reports report and decreased demand, Kraft Heinz removed Lunchables from school menus and the National School Lunch Program.

== See also ==
- Cheese and crackers
- List of brand name snack foods
- Lunchly
- Meal, Ready-to-Eat
- Ohio Valley–style pizza
