= Lunchly =

Brand of snack kits

- Logo used since 2024

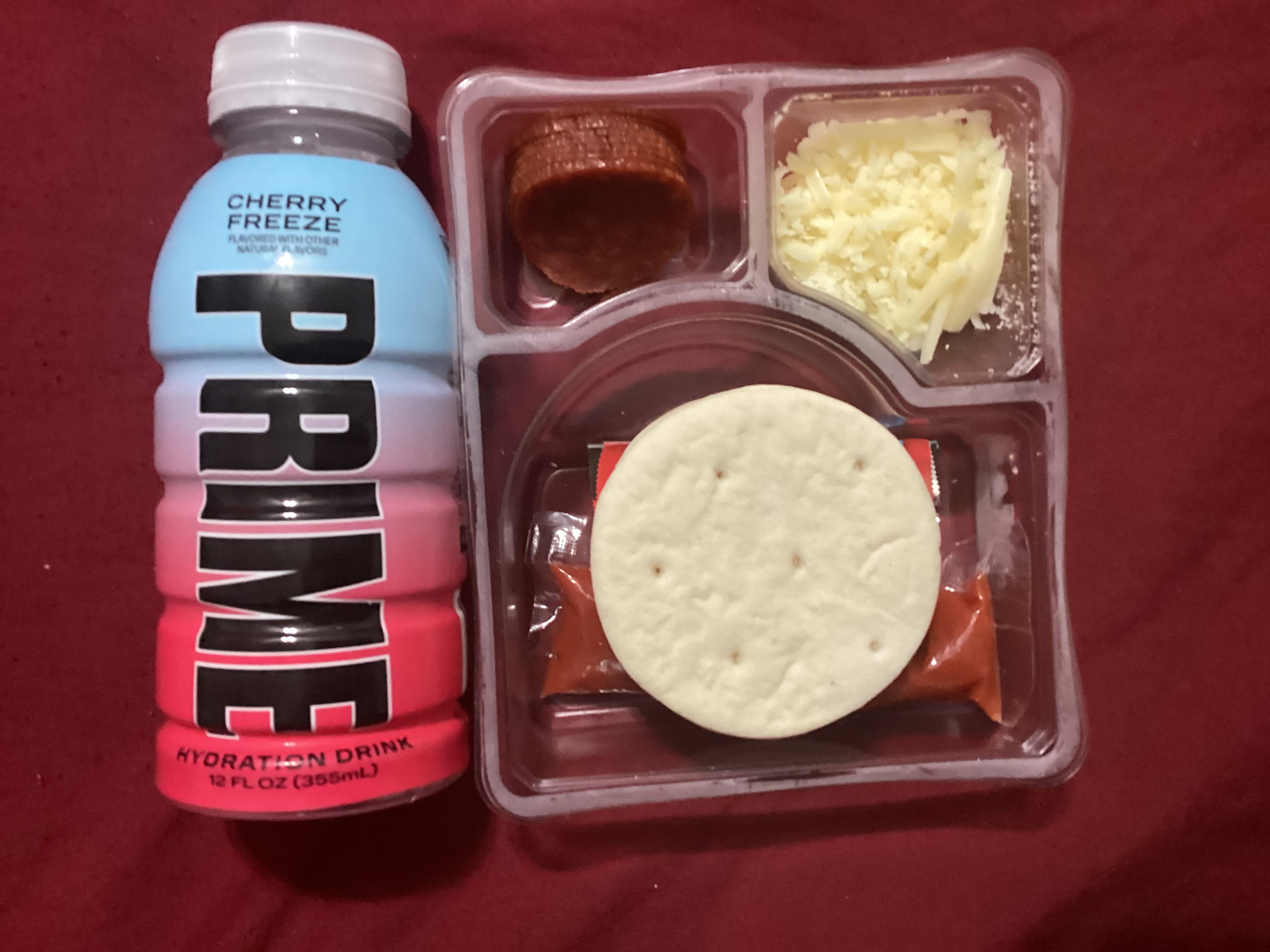
- "The Pizza" Lunchly; pepperoni, cheese, "pizza crust" and tomato sauce. Includes a Feastables Milk Crunch bar (pictured below crust) and a bottle of Cherry Freeze Prime.
- Product type: Snack
- Current owner: Lunchly LLC
- Country: United States
- Introduced: September 16, 2024; 2 years ago
- Related brands: Prime, Feastables
- Markets: Worldwide
- Registered as a trademark in: United States; May 16, 2024
- Ambassadors: KSI; Logan Paul; MrBeast
- Website: lunchly.com

Lunchly (stylized in all caps) is a brand of snack kits created and marketed by Lunchly LLC. The brand is promoted and founded as a joint venture between internet personalities Olajide "KSI" Olatunji, Logan Paul, and Jimmy "MrBeast" Donaldson. Each box includes a Prime drink and a Feastables chocolate bar, each pre-existing popular products offered by the creators, along with four varieties including turkey with cheese and crackers, nachos with salsa and cheese, pizza, or BBQ chicken dippers. The product line was announced on September 16, 2024.

Although it is marketed as a healthier competitor to Kraft Heinz's Lunchables, the claim has been disputed by several health experts. The Food and Drug Administration has received several complaints about the product.

== History ==
The product was announced to the public by KSI, Logan Paul, and MrBeast as a collaboration on September 16, 2024, following other food and beverage products such as Prime, a range of energy and sports drinks by Olatunji and Paul, and Feastables, a brand of chocolate bars by Donaldson. Both products are sold in combination with Lunchly kits. Lunchly is intended as a "healthier" alternative to Kraft Heinz's Lunchables, with both a calorie and sugar comparison to Lunchables on its website. Sodium and saturated fat are not included on the comparison.

At the time of Lunchly's release, Donaldson was in the midst of numerous controversies of his own. A number of social media experts speaking to Business Insider stated that Lunchly may benefit from the negative attention Donaldson was exposed to, while also noting that the launch may come across as a distraction. Following Lunchly's negative reception online, Paul claimed that Lunchly's headquarters had received a bomb threat from a caller based in London.

== Products ==
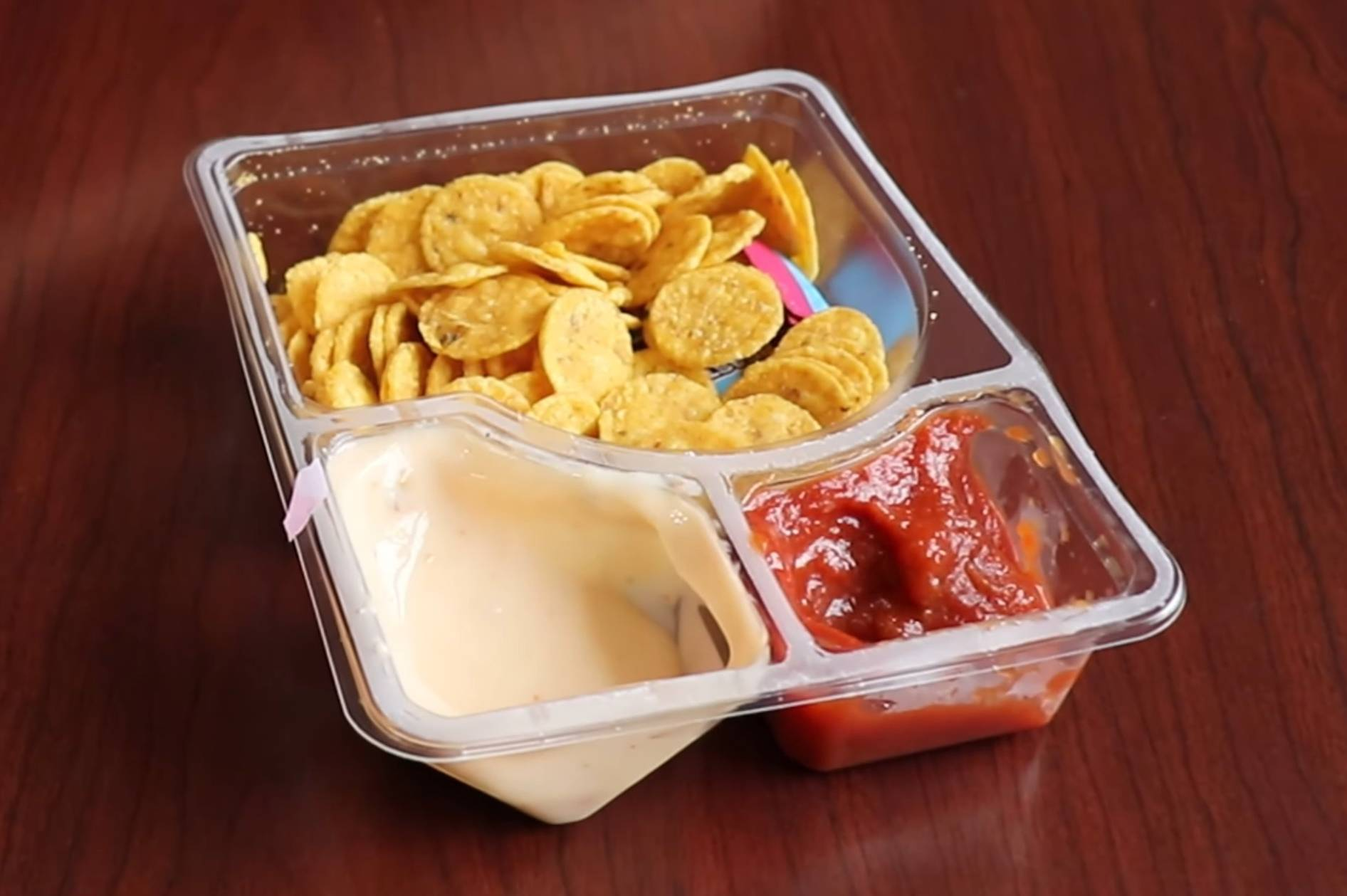
Contents of the Fiesta Nachos, with a Feastables bar in the nacho chips

As of September 2026, Lunchly has seven varieties of snack kits, all of which are reinterpretations of Lunchables products.

- "The Pizza": A consumer-built pizza kit with tomato sauce, pepperoni, and cheese, a small Cherry Freeze Prime bottle, and a snack-sized Feastables Milk Crunch Bar, based on the "Pizza with Pepperoni" Lunchable.
- Fiesta Nachos: A kit consisting of nacho chips with "queso blanco" dipping cheese and salsa, a small Strawberry Banana Prime bottle, and a snack-sized Feastables Milk Chocolate Bar, based on the "Nachos with Cheese Dip and Salsa" Lunchable.
- Turkey Stack 'Ems: A set of cheese, crackers, turkey, a small Ice Pop Prime bottle, and a snack-sized Feastables Milk Chocolate Bar, based on the "Turkey and American Cheese Cracker Stackers" Lunchable.
- Spicy Nachos: A set of spicy nacho chips, "queso blanco" dipping cheese and salsa, and a snack-sized Feastables Milk Chocolate Bar, based on the "Spicy Nachos" Lunchable.
- BBQ Chicken Dippers: A kit consisting of grilled chicken, BBQ sauce, Colby cheese cubes, a small MrBeast Prime bottle, and a snack-sized Feastables Cookies & Creme Bar.
- PB&J Dunkers: A set of crackers, "creamy" peanut butter, Concord grape jelly, and a snack-sized Feastables Milk Chocolate Bar.
- Lil Sammies: A line of frozen crustless sandwiches available in Peanut Butter & Grape, Peanut Butter & Strawberry, and Cookies & Cream varieties.

== Reception ==
=== Critics views ===
Lunchly was criticized by a number of Internet personalities. British YouTuber DanTDM expressed his disapproval of Lunchly, stating on Twitter: "This is selling crap to kids who don't know better than to trust the people who are selling it to them."

Forbes described the three packaged meals as "almost identical to existing offerings by Lunchables". The Mary Sue stated that Lunchly was likely intended to boost sales for Prime Hydration and Feastables.

=== Health concerns ===
Reviewing the product in October 2024, YouTuber Rosanna Pansino reported finding mold growing on the cheese in a packet of "The Pizza" variety. Following this, a number of social media users claimed to have likewise found mold in Lunchly packages. The Food and Drug Administration confirmed that it received over ten complaints about Lunchly, with one consumer reporting an illness linked to the product.

Doctor Mike, a family physician who releases educational health videos on YouTube, acknowledged that the product's sugar and saturated fat were slightly less than Lunchables, but estimated that a child would have to eat 2.7 Lunchly Turkey Stack 'Ems to achieve their recommended lunchtime calorie intake, and in doing so would consume close to their recommended daily intake of sodium. In the United Kingdom, youth campaign group Bite Back called the promotion of high-sugar and high-fat foods by a social media star "particularly worrying", and the chair of food and nutrition at the Children's Alliance charity described the launch as "junk food marketing".

In mid-2025, Consumer Reports assessed that Lunchly kits were not generally healthier than those of competitor Lunchables, and contained concerning levels of lead and phthalates.

== See also ==
- Pink Sauce
