= Prime (drink) =

Drink brand

Prime Hydration, LLC

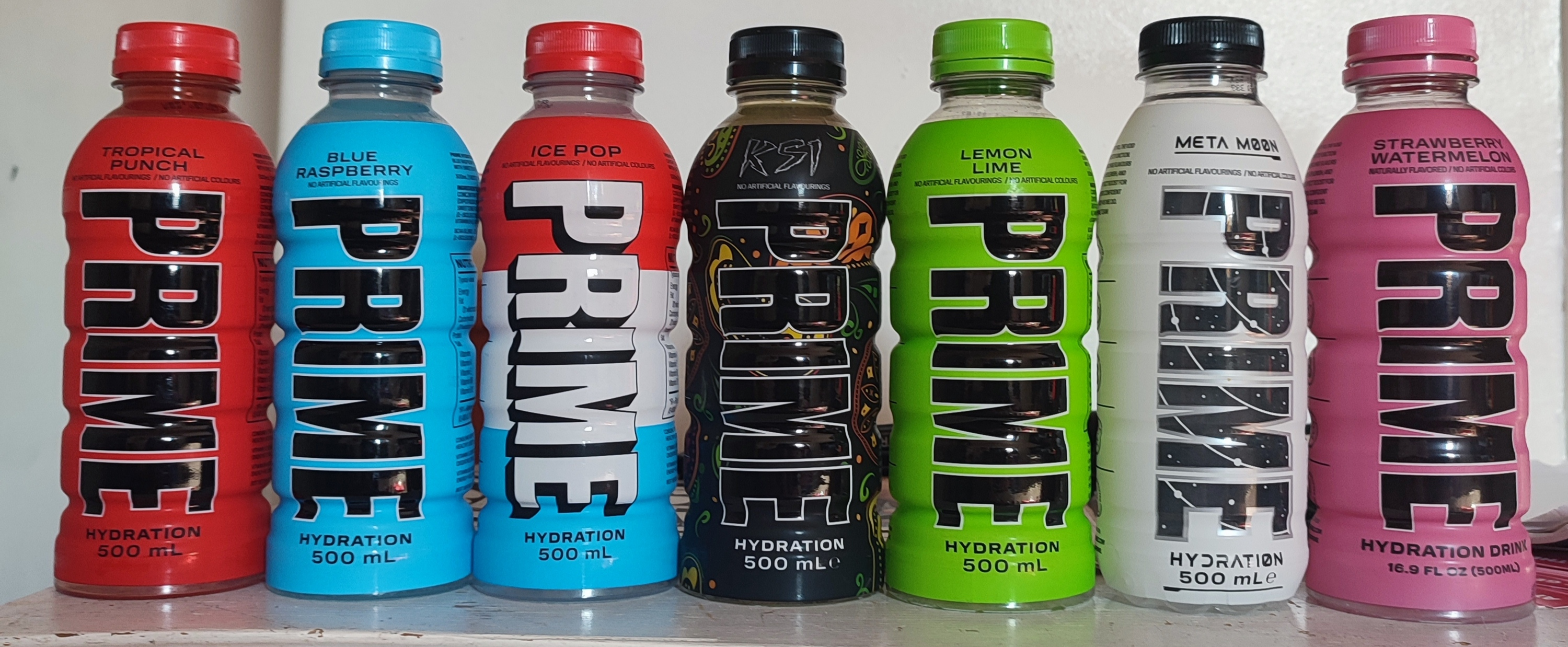
- A selection of different flavors of Prime
- Type: Sports drink, drink mix, energy drink, protein shake
- Manufacturer: Prime Hydration, LLC
- Distributor: Congo Brands
- Origin: United Kingdom; United States
- Introduced: January 4, 2022; 4 years ago
- Website: U.S. website UK website

Prime Hydration, LLC, styled “PRIME”, is an American brand of sports drinks, energy drinks, drink mixes and protein shakes owned by Congo LLC and Internet personalities Logan Paul and Olajide "KSI" Olatunji, who also promote the beverages.

Prime Hydration, the sports drink, was announced in January 2022, and became available in limited numbers from June 2022. The drink then became more widely available in late 2022 and early 2023, and was followed by massive social media hype, causing limited availability in stores. Prime Hydration+ Sticks later followed, as well as Prime Energy cans. Sponsorship deals later followed with Arsenal F.C., FC Barcelona, Ultimate Fighting Championship and WWE, which have included limited edition bottle designs. Prime Protein was announced in January 2026.

As of June 2025, Prime Hydration has significantly declined in popularity since its 2023 heyday, with the Prime Energy cans completely discontinued in some markets. In July 2026, Prime entered administration in Australia, citing that they had under $85,000 in cash left with millions of dollars in debt. The drink remains popular mainly in the United States and Canada (Walmart and CVS), and the United Kingdom (Asda and TGJones).

== History ==
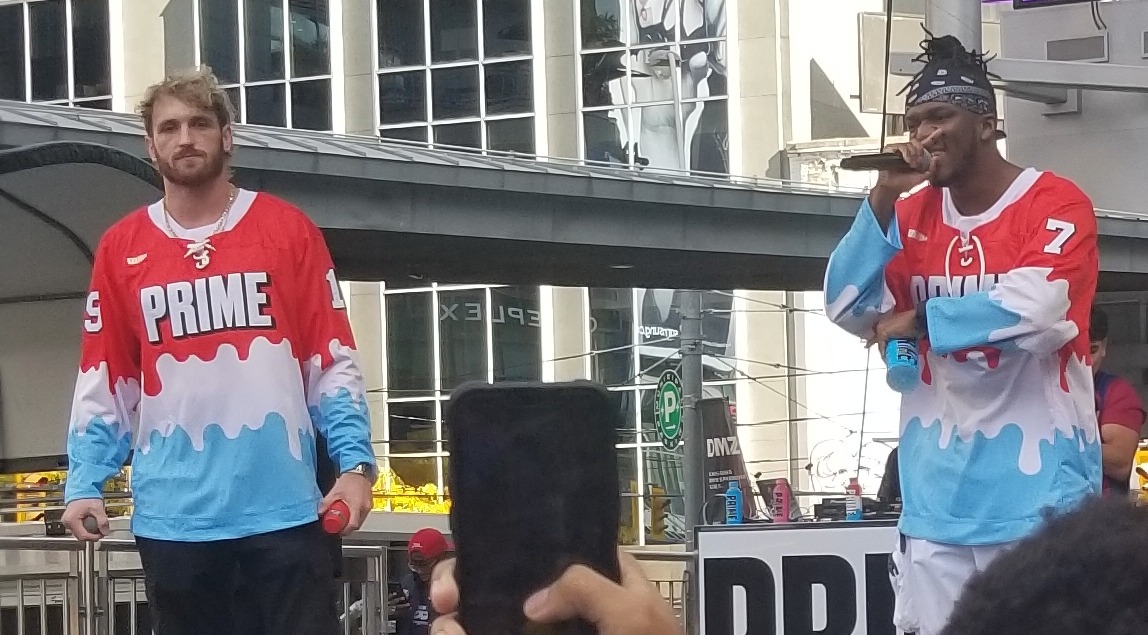
Prime creators KSI and Logan Paul.

=== Beginnings and social media hype ===
On January 4, 2022, YouTubers KSI and Logan Paul, with collectively more than 40 million YouTube subscribers and millions of followers on other platforms, announced on a live Instagram feed that they had founded a new drinks company known as Prime Hydration. Prime Hydration, LLC is affiliated with Congo Brands, co-owned by American businessmen Max Clemons and Trey Steiger.

On January 6, 2022, Prime Hydration announced the drink would be available in the United States only through DrinkPrime.com. In March 2022, Prime announced a distribution deal with Target. In June 2022, Prime announced a distribution deal with Asda in the United Kingdom, though it would not commence for a few months. The product was launched in June 2022, it was originally shipped from the United States, and was later manufactured by Refresco. The initial flavours included Tropical Punch, Orange, Lemon Lime, Blue Raspberry and Grape.

The involvement of KSI and Logan Paul led to a social media hype around the product, which was followed by demand from school-age children, particularly teenage boys.

In May 2022, Prime announced the release of Ice Pop through the Prime website.

According to the Evening Standard, the surge in demand caused high prices among online resellers, including an eBay listing offering twelve bottles for £400. Sky News reported that the release of the drink sparked "chaotic scenes" at Asda and Aldi supermarkets in the United Kingdom. A Financial Times article conveyed a London teacher's account of how children who only possessed used Prime bottles, filled with water, were "catapulted to higher status among their peers".

Mary McCarthy of The Independent, commenting on the way Prime was being marketed through social media, suggested that KSI and Logan Paul had undue influence on the product's main market—young boys—and that "cold, calculating big business" was working with individuals whose attitude towards women was questionable, and whose output was often misogynistic, aimed at boys "waiting to be told what to think".

Gordon Ramsay reviewed the drink on Heart radio, describing it as "like swallowing perfume", and giving it 0/10. Boxer Chris Eubank Jr. also tried the drink saying "It's very sweet, I mean it says it's naturally flavoured. It doesn't taste bad, but it's not a natural flavour of drink".

=== Sponsorship and influencer growth ===
Prime was the sponsor for Timmy Hill's number 13 MBM Motorsports car for one race in the NASCAR Xfinity Series. In their official statement they said it meant they have "access to talent and footballers which they do leverage in some of their marketing".

In July 2022, Premier League club Arsenal announced a joint marketing agreement with the company, with Prime becoming the official sports drink supplier for the club. In 2023, KSI had plans to make an Arsenal-flavored bottle if they were to win the Premier League. However, after a loss to Nottingham Forest, which led to rivals Manchester City winning the Premier League, the flavor was shelved and plans were cancelled.

In September 2022, Prime announced the release of Meta Moon.

In January 2023, the Ultimate Fighting Championship announced a joint marketing agreement with the company, with Prime becoming the official sports drink supplier for the mixed martial arts promotion company. Prime signed several athletes to sponsorships, including Alexander Volkanovski, Israel Adesanya, Patrick Mahomes, Alisha Lehmann and Erling Haaland. In February, Prime was promoted in a Super Bowl LVII commercial. In the summer of the same year, FC Barcelona and FC Bayern Munich signed a sponsorship agreement with Prime. In November, Toronto Maple Leafs player Auston Matthews signed a sponsorship agreement.

In January 2023, Prime announced Strawberry Watermelon. In February 2023, Prime announced KSI's UK exclusive Mango flavour. In May 2023, Prime announced Lemonade.

=== U.S. health concerns ===
In August 2023, the Milberg law firm filed a lawsuit against Prime Hydration in the Northern District of California. Independent chemical analyses revealed harmful levels of per- and polyfluoroalkyl substances in several Prime flavors, notably the grape variant. Elizabeth Castillo, a California resident and plaintiff in the lawsuit, stated that the undisclosed presence of PFAS would have influenced her decision not to purchase Prime, seeking US$5 million in damages. Paul challenged Castillo's claims, arguing that Prime contained only 0.06 parts per trillion (ppt) of PFAS, citing the United States Environmental Protection Agency's (EPA) standards, which deem measurements below 1.1 ppt unreliable due to detection limitations. Castillo and the Milberg law firm countered, asserting adherence to industry standards for PFAS detection in their independent testing, while also noting that Prime's PFAS levels exceeded the EPA's recommended lifetime health advisory.

=== Further influencer growth and sponsorship ===
In August 2023, Prime announced Glowberry. On November 30, 2023, the Federal Sanitary Inspection of the Federation of Bosnia and Herzegovina prohibited the import of 1,596 bottles of Prime Ice Pop Hydration due to testing showing inaccuracies on the nutrition label.

In December 2023, Prime announced Cherry Freeze.

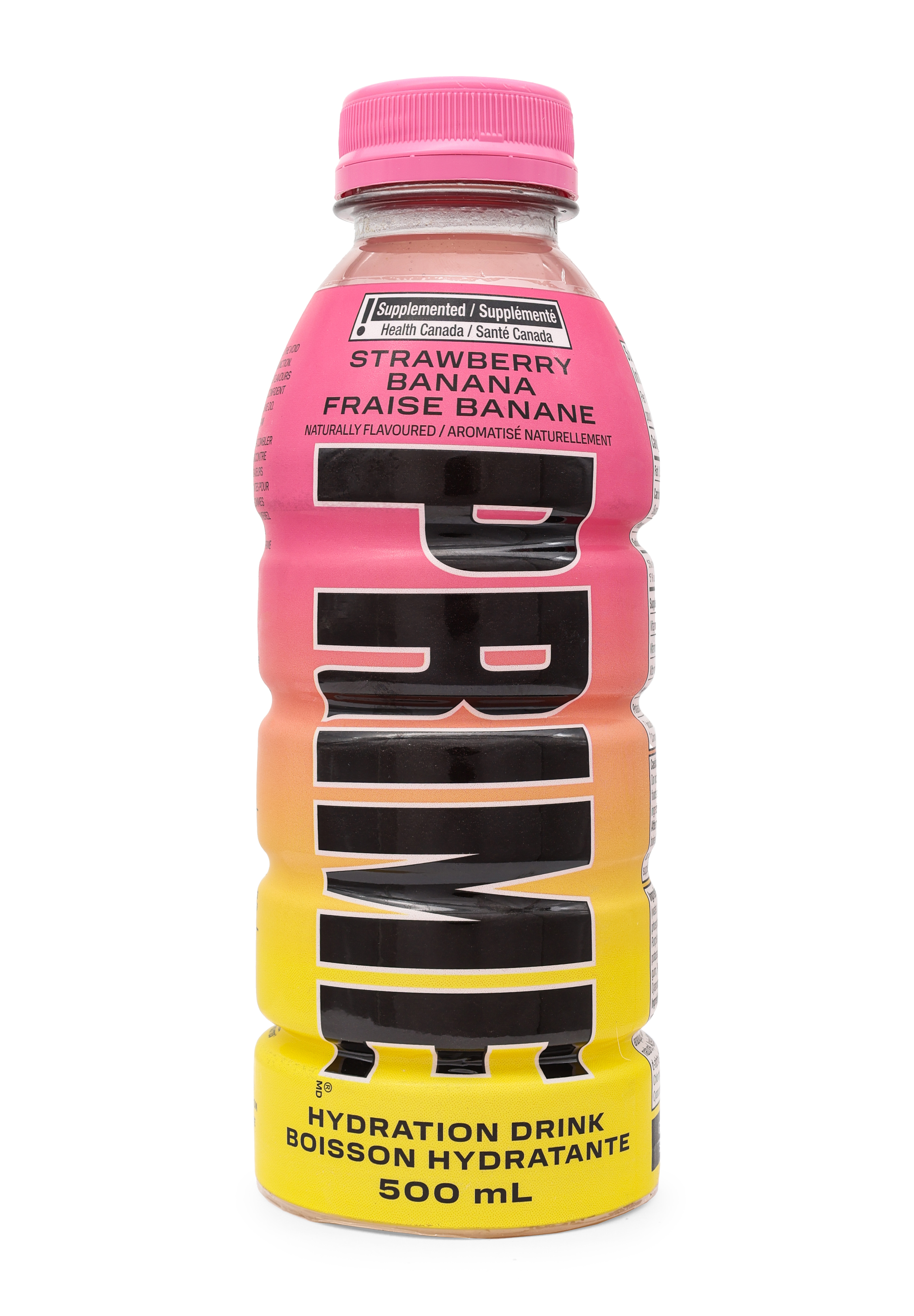
Prime Strawberry Banana, from Canada; after a recall, bottles were labelled in both English and French

In February 2024, NASCAR champion and Hendrick Motorsports driver Kyle Larson signed a sponsorship agreement with Prime. Also in February 2024, Borussia Dortmund signed a sponsorship agreement with Prime. In February 2024, Prime announced Strawberry Banana.

For April Fools' Day in 2024, Paul announced a Kentucky Fried Chicken flavor.

In April 2024, Prime became the first center-ring mat sponsor of WWE, for which Paul performs, when it was revealed during the March 8, 2024, episode of SmackDown. Since WrestleMania XL, it sponsors all of WWE's premium live events. Since WrestleMania XL, a stand with a Prime bottle prop at ringside (dubbed the "Hydration Station") has been used during episodes of Raw and SmackDown (in addition to the livestreaming events).

In May 2024, Prime became the official hydration partner of SL Benfica. The partnership is set to last until 2027. In the same month Prime released a collaboration with Erling Haaland and Arsenal F.C.

On July 19, 2024, the U.S. Olympic and Paralympic Committee filed a legal case against the brand for infringing the Olympics copyrights while the drink was being advertised. The lawsuit, filed in Colorado, accuses Prime of using trademarked Olympic phrases and symbols on a special edition of its drink featuring basketball star and three-time Olympic gold medallist Kevin Durant.

On August 14, 2024, Juventus signed a sponsorship agreement with Prime. In September 2024, a bottle for IShowSpeed was released, alongside a bottle for Central Cee. Prime also released exclusives for the Spanish and Mexican markets.

In November 2024, Prime announced a new flavour called Berry Freeze. In February 2025, Prime announced Future Freeze. In April 2025, Prime announced Sour Nova.

In July 2025, Prime announced Orange Kream, a collaboration with Circle K, only in Canada. Later, Prime announced KSI's The Nightmare, a strawberry cream drink. In November 2025, Prime announced the Snowball Slushy. Both of these released in North America and Europe.

In December 2025, Prime released the ZERO Hydration series, featuring zero sugar bottles of Prime, these were released on Amazon US.

In November 2025, Kiwi Berry was released in the US as an exclusive in QuikTrip and in February 2026, Kiwi Berry was released in the UK as an exclusive in TGJones. In March 2026, Grape Zero appeared in the UK as an exclusive in Asda, before being rolled out to other locations.

In March 2026, Prime announced a deal with Costco with the exclusive flavor Citrus Tide appearing in a multi-pack only in North America.

Also in March 2026, Prime Hydration released Frostbite Fusion, a re-release of Citrus Tide, exclusive to the U.S., Canada and UK.

In late July 2026, Prime announced the Summer Pop Hydration flavour in the US and Canada.

=== Product decline ===
Bloomberg reported that Prime achieved sales of $250 million in 2022 and $1.2 billion in 2023. Sales of Prime in the UK declined 48% in 2024, making it the fastest falling food or drink brand according to consumer data from NielsenIQ.

In 2024, the Food and Veterinary Service of Latvia suspended imports of Prime Hydration into the country as a result of discrepancies between the Latvian-language label and the original English-language label. It ordered the company to immediately address its compliance with labelling regulations recently .

In June 2025, it was reported that Prime Hydration sales had undergone a 71% collapse in the United Kingdom.

In July 2026, Prime entered administration in Australia, citing that they had only $85,000 in cash left with over millions in debt.

== Other brands ==
=== Prime Hydration+ Sticks ===
In September 2022, Prime announced the Prime Hydration+ Sticks, exclusive to Walmart.

=== Prime Energy ===
In January 2023, Prime Hydration announced a spin-off called Prime Energy, containing 200 mg of caffeine and shares several flavors with its sports drink counterpart. These energy drinks generated controversy due to their marketing campaign, which has been criticized for media hype associated with their high concentration of caffeine. Several countries, jurisdictions, and primary and secondary schools have banned or restricted the drink due to its caffeine content exceeding legal limits, or otherwise being deemed unsafe for children. Prime Energy, which contains elevated levels of caffeine, has been banned or restricted from minors in multiple countries due to regulations limiting caffeine content. The drink has also been banned in schools in several countries.

In March 2023, it was reported that several Australian schools had instituted bans on Prime Energy drinks, as a health risk to students due to its high caffeine levels. ABC News noted that the Food Standards Australia New Zealand legal limit for caffeine was 32 mg per 100 ml, while Prime contains around 56 mg per 100 ml. A sports dietician, who described the drink as an "addictive substance" went on to state that "giving a dose of caffeine to young children who've got ... developing cognitive function is not a wise idea". ABC noted that the drink, on sale in Woolworths stores, carried a disclaimer stating that the drink "is not suitable for children under the age of 15, pregnant or breastfeeding women, and should only be used under medical or dietetic supervision".

In March 2023, several schools in Queensland, Victoria and Western Australia banned Prime Energy. In April, several New South Wales schools followed. In April 2023, a store in Perth controversially allowed the sale of Prime Energy to minors.

In April 2023 in Denmark, some retailers had begun parallel importing Prime beverages before an official launch of the product in the country. This led to issues as Prime Energy was not compliant with Danish regulations, as the drink's caffeine concentration exceeded the approved limit. The Danish Veterinary and Food Administration announced that it advised five retailers to pull the parallel imported product.

In June 2023, Prime Hydration launched officially in the country, kicking off in Salling Group supermarkets and Circle K convenience stores. For the product to be compliant and distributed in the country, the Prime Hydration product had been modified to not contain vitamin A, and the Prime Energy drinks were not subject to sale, as they were above the regulatory limit for caffeine.

In June 2023, Prime Energy attracted headlines in New Zealand, as it is illegal to sell the original Prime Energy drink as it contains 579 mg of caffeine per litre, which is above the legal limit of 320 mg. Police Minister Ginny Andersen warned that businesses selling the product can face fines up to NZ$100,000. The drink was previously available on retail website Trade Me, but listings were removed following enquiries by media company Stuff. A modified version is available in some New Zealand stores, with a lowered caffeine content of 310 mg per litre.

In June 2023 in Norway, the brand and drink sparked controversy when creators Logan Paul and KSI visited Oslo as part of their European tour promoting the upcoming launch of the drink. The promotional event, which gathered more than 2,000 fans and was heavily advertised in social media, was criticized for the lack of security and organization, which led to 70 people needing medical attention due to heat and crowding. sales of both the Energy and Hydration variants were initially banned in 2023, but were both sold by import shops online or purchased from Sweden and then resold by consumers until authorities halted such sales in May 2023. Prime Hydration was initially barred from sales due to levels of vitamin A being above national regulations. In July 2023, a European variant was launched that adhered to European and Norwegian consumer standards and regulations. Prime Energy remained banned from sales as it contains 579 mg of caffeine per litre, which is above the Norwegian legal limit of 320 mg, but in 2024 a variant with reduced caffeine content became available in Norwegian stores.

On July 9, 2023, Senator Chuck Schumer urged the U.S. Food and Drug Administration to investigate Prime Energy due to its high caffeine content, and because of unclear marketing which could lead to parents purchasing a "cauldron of caffeine" for children.

On July 12, 2023, Health Canada issued a recall on various caffeinated and non-bilingual-labeled drinks, including Prime Energy. This decision came after many complaints of the high volume of caffeine in the product, which exceeds the maximum 180 mg allowed in Canada. Furthermore, food products sold in Canada must have bilingual (English and French) packaging as both languages are official languages in Canada.

On August 8, 2023, the Netherlands blocked the sale of Prime Energy due to its high caffeine content.

On November 13, 2023, the Inspection by the Administration of Food Safety, Veterinary Medicine and Plant Protection of the Republic of Slovenia banned the sale of Prime Energy drinks in Slovenia as they contain L-theanine, which is not allowed in non-alcoholic beverages.

== Legacy ==
In the 2023 South Park television special "Not Suitable for Children," the energy drink Cred becomes a popular trend among children. The drink is a parody of Prime, mimicking its bottle design.

In 2024, Más+, sponsored by Lionel Messi, launched and was criticized by some social media users for its similarity to Prime. It since ceased production in early 2026.

== See also ==
- Gatorade
- Powerade
- Lucozade
- All Sport
- Bodyarmor SuperDrink
