= KSI discography =

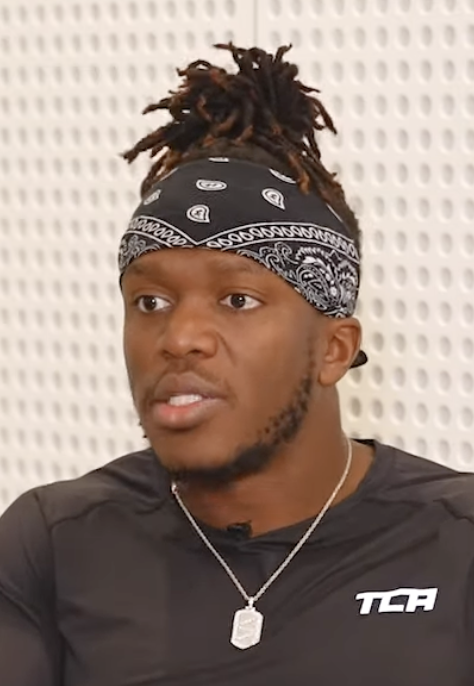
- KSI in 2024
- Studio albums: 2
- EPs: 4
- Singles: 22
- Music videos: 32
- Collaborative albums: 1
- Charity singles: 2

The discography of English YouTuber, musician and former professional boxer Olajide Olayinka Williams Olatunji, known as KSI, consists of two studio albums, one collaboration album, four extended plays (EPs), 22 singles, and 33 music videos.

== Albums ==
=== Studio albums ===
List of studio albums, with selected chart positions, sales and certifications
Title	Details	Peak chart positions										Sales	Certifications
Title	Details	UK	AUS	BEL	CAN	DEN	IRE	NLD	NZ	SWE	US	Sales	Certifications
Dissimulation	Released: 22 May 2020; Label: RBC, BMG; Formats: Digital download, streaming, CD	2	4	9	33	9	1	14	3	15	149	UK: 100,488	BPI: Gold
All Over the Place	Released: 16 July 2021; Label: RBC, BMG; Formats: Digital download, streaming, CD, vinyl, cassette	1	6	6	16	5	2	12	5	13	94	UK: 101,607	BPI: Gold; RMNZ: Gold

=== Collaborative albums ===
List of collaborative studio albums, with selected chart positions
Title	Details	Peak chart positions									
Title	Details	UK	UK HH/R&B	UK Ind	EST	IRE	LAT	LIT	NLD	NOR	SCO
New Age (with Randolph)	Released: 12 April 2019; Label: Self-released; Formats: Digital download, streaming	17	1	10	7	29	19	24	75	26	40

== Extended plays ==
List of extended plays, with selected chart positions
Title	Details	Peak chart positions						
Title	Details	UK	UK HH/R&B	CAN	NZ	SCO	US R&B/HH	US Rap
Keep Up	Released: 8 January 2016; Label: Island, Universal; Formats: CD, digital download, streaming	13	1	63	23	15	19	14
Jump Around	Released: 28 October 2016; Label: Island, Universal; Formats: Digital download, streaming	— (Note: Jump Around did not enter the UK Albums Chart, but peaked at number 60 on the UK Album Downloads Chart.)	—	—	—	—	—	—
Space	Released: 30 June 2017; Label: Self-released; Formats: Digital download, streaming	— (Note: Space did not enter the UK Albums Chart, but peaked at number 19 on the UK Album Downloads Chart.)	—	—	— (Note: Space did not enter the New Zealand Albums Chart, but debuted at number 6 on the New Zealand Heatseeker Albums Chart.)	87	—	—
Disstracktions	Released: 29 September 2017; Label: Island, Universal; Formats: Digital download, streaming	31	1	—	—	—	—	—
"—" denotes a recording that did not chart or was not released in that territory.

== Singles ==
=== As lead artist ===
List of singles as lead artist, with selected chart positions, certifications and album name
Title	Year	Peak chart positions										Certifications	Album
Title	Year	UK	AUS	CAN	DEN	HUN	IRE	NZ	NOR	SWE	US	Certifications	Album
"Lamborghini" (featuring P Money)	2015	30	—	—	—	—	61	—	—	—	—		Non-album single
"Keep Up" (featuring Jme)	2015	45	78	—	—	—	90	—	—	—	—		Keep Up
"Goes Off" (featuring Mista Silva)	2016	—	—	—	—	—	—	—	—	—	—		Jump Around
"Friends with Benefits" (with MNDM)	2016	69	—	—	—	—	—	—	—	—	—		Jump Around
"Jump Around" (featuring Waka Flocka Flame)	2016	— (Note: "Jump Around" did not enter the UK Singles Chart, but debuted at number 73 on the UK Singles Downloads Chart.)	—	—	—	—	—	—	—	—	—		Jump Around
"Creature"	2017	100	—	—	—	—	—	—	—	—	—		Space
"Uncontrollable" (featuring Big Zuu)	2018	89	—	—	—	—	—	—	—	—	—		Non-album singles
"On Point"	2018	— (Note: "On Point" did not enter the UK Singles Chart, but debuted at number 86 on the UK Singles Downloads Chart and number 23 on the UK Independent Singles Chart.)	—	—	—	—	—	—	—	—	—		Non-album singles
"Ares"	2018	—	—	—	—	—	—	—	—	—	—		Non-album singles
"Beerus" (with Randolph)	2018	— (Note: "Beerus" did not enter the UK Singles Chart, but peaked at number 43 on the UK Independent Singles Chart.)	—	—	—	—	—	—	—	—	—		New Age
"Red Alert" (with Randolph)	2019	—	—	—	—	—	—	—	—	—	—		New Age
"Down Like That" (featuring Rick Ross, Lil Baby and S-X)	2019	10	—	77	—	—	26	— (Note: "Down Like That" did not enter the New Zealand Singles Chart, but peaked at number 10 on the New Zealand Hot Singles Chart.)	—	—	—	BPI: Gold	Dissimulation
"Wake Up Call" (featuring Trippie Redd)	2020	11	92	85	—	26	23	— (Note: "Wake Up Call" did not enter the New Zealand Singles Chart, but peaked at number 3 on the New Zealand Hot Singles Chart.)	—	—	—	BPI: Silver	Dissimulation
"Poppin" (featuring Lil Pump and Smokepurpp)	2020	43	—	—	—	—	52	— (Note: "Poppin" did not enter the New Zealand Singles Chart, but peaked at number 13 on the New Zealand Hot Singles Chart.)	—	—	—		Dissimulation
"Houdini" (featuring Swarmz and Tion Wayne)	2020	6	— (Note: "Houdini" did not enter the Australian Singles Chart, but debuted at number 36 on the Australian Hip Hop/R&B Singles Chart.)	—	—	—	11	— (Note: "Houdini" did not enter the New Zealand Singles Chart, but peaked at number 3 on the New Zealand Hot Singles Chart.)	—	—	—	BPI: Silver	Dissimulation
"Really Love" (featuring Craig David and Digital Farm Animals)	2020	3	— (Note: "Really Love" did not enter the Australian Singles Chart, but peaked at number 32 on the Australian Digital Tracks Chart.)	—	—	25	18	— (Note: "Really Love" did not enter the New Zealand Singles Chart, but peaked at number 7 on the New Zealand Hot Singles Chart.)	—	—	— (Note: "Really Love" did not enter the Billboard Hot 100, but peaked at number 17 on the US Hot Dance/Electronic Songs chart.)	BPI: Platinum	All Over the Place
"Don't Play" (with Anne-Marie and Digital Farm Animals) (Note: "Don't Play" is also included on Anne-Marie's second studio album Therapy.)	2021	2	— (Note: "Don't Play" did not enter the Australian Singles Chart, but peaked at number 27 on the Australian Digital Tracks Chart.)	—	—	20	9	— (Note: "Don't Play" did not enter the New Zealand Singles Chart, but peaked at number 4 on the New Zealand Hot Singles Chart.)	—	— (Note: "Don't Play" did not enter the Swedish Singles Chart, but peaked at number 18 on the Swedish Heatseeker Chart.)	— (Note: "Don't Play" did not enter the Billboard Hot 100, but peaked at number 12 on the US Hot Dance/Electronic Songs chart.)	BPI: Platinum	All Over the Place
"Patience" (featuring Yungblud and Polo G)	2021	3	61	94	37	14	8	— (Note: "Patience" did not enter the New Zealand Singles Chart, but peaked at number 4 on the New Zealand Hot Singles Chart.)	37	— (Note: "Patience" did not enter the Swedish Singles Chart, but peaked at number 18 on the Swedish Heatseeker Chart.)	— (Note: "Patience" did not enter the Billboard Hot 100, but peaked at number 5 on the Bubbling Under Hot 100 Singles chart.)	BPI: Gold	All Over the Place
"Holiday"	2021	2	24	57	33	—	2	16	26	97	—	BPI: Platinum; IFPI NOR: Gold; RMNZ: Platinum	All Over the Place
"Lose" (with Lil Wayne)	2021	18	38	61	—	18	20	35	25	100	86		All Over the Place
"Not Over Yet" (featuring Tom Grennan or Headie One and Nines) (Note: "Not Over Yet" is also included on Tom Grennan's third studio album What Ifs & Maybes.)	2022	4	47	—	—	—	11	— (Note: "Not Over Yet" did not enter the NZ Top 40 Singles Chart, but peaked at number two on the NZ Hot Singles Chart.)	—	— (Note: "Not Over Yet" did not enter the Swedish Singellista Chart, but peaked at number five on the Swedish Heatseeker Chart.)	—	BPI: Platinum	Non-album singles
"Summer Is Over"	2022	24	—	—	—	—	35	— (Note: "Summer Is Over" did not enter the NZ Top 40 Singles Chart, but peaked at number seven on the NZ Hot Singles Chart.)	—	—	—		Non-album singles
"Voices" (featuring Oliver Tree)	2023	11	—	—	—	—	27	— (Note: "Voices" did not enter the NZ Top 40 Singles Chart, but peaked at number five on the NZ Hot Singles Chart.)	—	—	—		Non-album singles
"Easy" (with Bugzy Malone and R3hab)	2023	—	—	—	—	—	—	— (Note: "Easy" did not enter the NZ Top 40 Singles Chart, but peaked at number 38 on the NZ Hot Singles Chart.)	—	—	—		Non-album singles
"Thick of It" (featuring Trippie Redd) (Note: "Low" was also released alongside "Thick of It.")	2024	6	29	31	—	—	14	17	17	48	64	BPI: Gold; ARIA: Platinum; MC: Gold; RIAA: Gold; RMNZ: Gold	Non-album singles
"Dirty"	2024	31	—	—	—	—	—	— (Note: "Dirty" did not enter the NZ Top 40 Singles Chart, but peaked at number 1 on the NZ Hot Singles Chart.)	—	—	—		Non-album singles
"Catch Me if You Can" (Note: "So Far Away" was also released alongside "Catch Me if You Can".)	2025	—	—	—	—	—	—	—	—	—	—		Non-album singles
"—" denotes a recording that did not chart or was not released in that territory.

=== As featured artist ===
List of singles as featured artist, with selected chart positions, certifications and album name
Title	Year	Peak chart positions										Certifications	Album
Title	Year	UK	UK HH/R&B	UK Dance	CZE	HUN	IRE	NZ Hot	SCO	US Dance	CRO	Certifications	Album
"No Sleep" (Sway featuring KSI and Tiggs Da Author)	2013	44	11	—	—	—	—	—	41	—	—		Wake Up
"World Cup Song" (Joe Weller featuring Randolph and KSI)	2014	89	17	—	—	—	—	—	—	—	—		Non-album singles
"MAC-10 Flow" (Sway featuring KSI)	2014	—	—	—	—	—	—	—	—	—	—		Non-album singles
"For the Summer" (Randolph featuring KSI)	2016	—	—	—	—	—	—	—	—	—	—		Non-album singles
"Slow Motion" (Randolph featuring KSI)	2018	—	—	—	—	—	—	—	—	—	—		New Age
"Punch Back" (5ive 9ine featuring KSI)	2018	—	—	—	—	—	—	—	—	—	—		Return
"Lighter" (Nathan Dawe featuring KSI)	2020	3	—	2	37	15	8	17	1	18	49	BPI: Platinum; RMNZ: Gold	If Heaven Had a Phone Line
"Loose" (S1mba featuring KSI)	2020	14	10	—	—	—	23	7	11	—	—	BPI: Silver	Good Time Long Time
"Swerve" (Note: KSI is a featured artist on "Swerve", not a main artist.) (Jay1 featuring KSI)	2021	69	22	—	—	—	95	36	—	—	—		All Over the Place
"Locked Out" (S-X featuring KSI)	2022	53	—	—	—	—	62	14	—	—	—		Things Change
"—" denotes a recording that did not chart or was not released in that territory.

=== Promotional singles ===
List of promotional singles, with selected chart positions, showing year released and album name
Title	Year	Peak chart positions			Certifications	Album
Title	Year	UK	IRE	NZ	Certifications	Album
"Killa Killa" (featuring Aiyana-Lee)	2020	27	33	— (Note: "Killa Killa" did not enter the New Zealand Singles Chart, but peaked at number 12 on the New Zealand Hot Singles Chart.)		Dissimulation
"Low"	2024	—	—	—		TBA
"So Far Away" (featuring S-X)	2025	—	—	—		TBA
"—" denotes a recording that did not chart or was not released in that territory.

=== Charity singles ===
List of charity singles, with selected chart positions
Title	Year	Peak chart positions								Notes
Title	Year	UK	UK Down.	UK Ind.	EUR	GLO Excl. US	SLO	IRE	NZ Hot	Notes
"Stop Crying Your Heart Out" (as part of BBC Radio 2 Allstars)	2020	7	1	—	1	114	85	—	—	Produced by BBC Radio 2 and released to raise money for Children in Need 2020.
"Christmas Drillings" (as part of Sidemen featuring Jme)	2022	3	—	2	—	—	—	25	7	Produced for a Sidemen Sunday video and raised money for FareShare.
"—" denotes a recording that did not chart or was not released in that territory.

=== Remixes ===
List of remixes
Title	Year	Album
"Naruto Drillings (Remix)" (with Offica)	2019	Non-album single

== Other charted songs ==
List of other charted songs, with selected chart positions and album name
Title	Year	Peak chart positions										Album
Title	Year	UK	UK R&B	UK Indie	UK Stre.	GRE	IRE	LIT	NZ Hot	SCO	SWE Heat.	Album
"Little Boy"	2017	82	39	—	—	—	—	—	—	87	—	Disstracktions
"Two Birds, One Stone"	2017	97	—	—	—	—	—	—	—	—	—	Disstracktions
"Adam's Apple"	2017	93	—	—	—	—	—	—	—	—	—	Disstracktions
"New Age" (with Randolph)	2019	—	—	50	—	—	—	—	—	—	—	New Age
"Real Name" (with Randolph featuring Talia Mar)	2019	— (Note: "Real Name" did not enter the UK Singles Chart, but sat at number 84 on the mid-week UK Singles Chart Update.)	—	19	—	—	—	—	38	—	—	New Age
"Pull Up" (featuring Jme)	2019	94	—	15	—	—	—	—	—	—	—	New Age
"The Gift" (as part of Sidemen featuring S-X)	2019	77	40	11	—	—	—	—	27	26	—	Non-album single
"What You Been On"	2020	—	23	8	37	—	—	—	16	—	—	Dissimulation
"Cap" (featuring Offset)	2020	24	14	4	—	98	26	98	5	—	—	Dissimulation
"Bad Lil Vibe" (featuring Jeremih)	2020	—	22	7	34	—	—	—	14	—	—	Dissimulation
"How It Feel"	2020	—	40	16	62	—	—	—	—	—	—	Dissimulation
"Domain"	2020	—	28	11	38	—	—	—	—	—	—	Dissimulation
"Undefeated"	2020	—	37	13	58	—	—	—	—	—	—	Dissimulation
"Millions"	2020	— (Note: "Millions" did not enter the UK Singles Chart, but peaked at number 35 on the UK Audio Streaming Chart.)	27	10	—	—	—	—	—	—	—	Dissimulation
"Tides" (featuring AJ Tracey and Rich the Kid)	2020	— (Note: "Tides" did not enter the UK Singles Chart, but peaked at number 73 on the UK Singles Downloads Chart.)	—	16	—	—	—	—	—	88	—	Dissimulation
"The Moment"	2021	—	—	7	—	—	—	—	14	—	—	All Over the Place
"Number 2" (featuring Future and 21 Savage)	2021	—	15	8	53	—	—	—	11	—	—	All Over the Place
"You"	2021	—	—	13	—	—	—	—	—	—	—	All Over the Place
"Gang Gang" (featuring Jay1 and Deno)	2021	40	14	6	—	—	53	—	19	—	—	All Over the Place
"Rent Free" (featuring Gracey)	2021	—	—	31	—	—	—	—	—	—	—	All Over the Place
"Madness"	2021	—	—	14	—	—	—	—	—	—	—	All Over the Place
"Silly" (featuring Bugzy Malone)	2021	—	—	18	—	—	—	—	—	—	—	All Over the Place
"Flash It" (featuring Rico Love)	2021	—	—	33	—	—	—	—	—	—	—	All Over the Place
"No Time" (featuring Lil Durk)	2021	24	7	3	—	—	30	—	4	—	19	All Over the Place
"No Pressure"	2021	—	—	19	—	—	—	—	—	—	—	All Over the Place
"Sleeping with the Enemy" (featuring S-X)	2021	—	—	22	—	—	—	—	—	—	—	All Over the Place
"—" denotes a recording that did not chart or was not released in that territory.

== Guest appearances ==
List of non-single guest appearances, with other performing artists
Title	Year	Other artist(s)	Album
"Christian Bale"	2014	Yogi, Casey Veggies, Knytro, Sway	Burial
"Fine by Me"	2015	Randolph	Lost Cause
"Wanna Be"	2016	Sway	The Deliverance
"Subzero"	2018	RIL	Livin' Sports
"Player One"	2019	P Money, Jme	Money Over Everyone 3
"Devil's Advocate Interlude"	2019	RIL	Livin' Sports, Pt. 2
"The Gift"	2019	Sidemen, S-X	Non-album single

== Music videos ==
List of music videos as lead and featured artist, showing directors
Title	Year	Director(s)	Ref.
As lead artist
"Lamborghini" (featuring P Money)	2015	Jak X	
"Keep Up" (featuring Jme)	2015	Jack Delaney	
"Kilimanjaro"	2015	Zagor	
"Smoke N Mirrors" (featuring Tiggs Da Author, Lunar C and Nick Brewer)	2016	Carly Cussen	
"Friends with Benefits" (with MNDM)	2016	Harrison Boyce	
"Jump Around" (featuring Waka Flocka Flame)	2016	Unknown	
"Creature"	2017	Gyo Gyimah	
"Earthquake" (featuring RiceGum)	2017	Jovan Thomas	(Note: The music video for "Earthquake" was permanently deleted by KSI on 3 May 2020, as shown in his YouTube video titled "Ricegum says he makes better music than me...".)
"Little Boy"	2017	Jovan Thomas	
"Two Birds One Stone"	2017	RvbberDuck	
"Adam's Apple"	2017	Konstantin	
"Transforming"	2017	David Donihue	
"Uncontrollable" (featuring Big Zuu)	2018	RvbberDuck	
"On Point"	2018	Konstantin	
"Ares"	2018	RvbberDuck	
"Beerus" (with Randolph)	2018	Konstantin	
"Red Alert" (with Randolph)	2019	Konstantin	
"Pull Up" (featuring Jme)	2019	Konstantin	
"Real Name" (with Randolph featuring Talia Mar)	2019	RvbberDuck	
"Down Like That" (featuring Rick Ross, Lil Baby and S-X)	2019	Nayip Ramos	
"Wake Up Call" (featuring Trippie Redd)	2020	Nayip Ramos	
"Poppin" (featuring Lil Pump and Smokepurpp)	2020	TajvsTaj	
"Houdini" (featuring Swarmz and Tion Wayne)	2020	Kaylum	
"Cap" (featuring Offset)	2020	TajvsTaj	
"Killa Killa" (featuring Aiyana-Lee)	2020	Troy Roscoe and Nayip Ramos	
"Really Love" (featuring Craig David and Digital Farm Animals)	2020	Troy Roscoe	
"Domain"	2020	Konstantin and Guy Davies	
"Don't Play" (with Anne-Marie and Digital Farm Animals)	2021	Troy Roscoe	
"Patience" (featuring YUNGBLUD & Polo G)	2021	Troy Roscoe and Nayip Ramos	
"Holiday"	2021	Troy Roscoe	
"Number 2" (featuring Future & 21 Savage)	2021	Troy Roscoe and Nayip Ramos	
"Lose" (with Lil Wayne)	2021	Troy Roscoe	
"No Time" (featuring Lil Durk)	2021	KDC Visions	
"Not Over Yet" (featuring Tom Grennan)	2022	Troy Roscoe	
"Summer is Over"	2022	Troy Roscoe	
"Voices" (featuring Oliver Tree)	2023	Oliver Tree	
"Thick of It" (featuring Trippie Redd)	2024	KC Locke	
"Catch Me if You Can"	2025	Troy Roscoe	
As featured artist
"No Sleep" (Sway featuring KSI and Tiggs Da Author)	2013	Jack Delaney	
"World Cup Song" (Joe Weller featuring KSI and Randolph)	2014	Unknown	(Note: The music video for "World Cup Song" was permanently deleted by Joe Weller on an unknown date.)
"Slow Motion" (Randolph featuring KSI)	2018	RvbberDuck	
"Naruto Drillings (Remix)" (Offica featuring KSI)	2019	Ed Didn't	
"The Gift" (as part of Sidemen featuring S-X)	2019	Konstantin	
"Lighter" (Nathan Dawe featuring KSI)	2020	Troy Roscoe	
"Loose" (S1mba featuring KSI)	2020	Capone	
"Stop Crying Your Heart Out" (as part of BBC Radio 2 Allstars)	2020	Phil Deacon	
"Swerve" (Jay1 featuring KSI)	2021	LX	
"Locked Out" (S-X featuring KSI)	2022	Troy Roscoe	
"Christmas Drillings" (as part of Sidemen featuring Jme)	2022	Konstantin	

== See also ==
- List of songs recorded by KSI
