= List of songs recorded by KSI =

Songs recorded by YouTuber, KSI

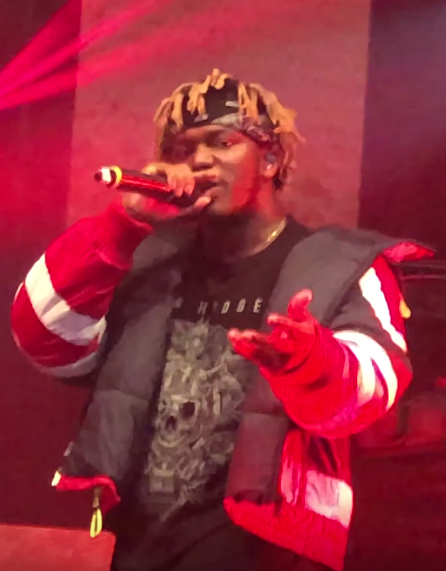
KSI performing in 2019

KSI is a British influencer, professional boxer, and musician.

== Songs ==
Key
†	Indicates single release

Name of song, featured performers, writers, originating album, and year released.
Song	Artist(s)	Writer(s)	Album	Year	Ref.
"64 Impala"	KSI	Olajide Olatunji; Tuna Erlat	Space	2017	
"Adam's Apple"	KSI	Olajide Olatunji; Zeeshan Azad	Disstracktions	2017	
"Ares"	KSI	Olajide Olatunji; Zeeshan Azad	Non-album single	2018	
"Bad Lil Vibe"	KSI featuring Jeremih	Olajide Olatunji; Jeremy Felton; Diego Avendano; Jamal Rashid; Leandro Hidalgo; Ryan Murray; Ivory Scott; Mams Taylor	Dissimulation	2020	
"Beerus"	KSI and Randolph	Olajide Olatunji; Andrew Shane; Zeeshan Azad	New Age	2018	
"Bow Down"	KSI and Randolph	Olajide Olatunji; Andrew Shane; Zeeshan Azad	New Age	2019	
"Cap"	KSI featuring Offset	Olajide Olatunji; Kiari Cephus; Diego Avendano; Kevin Price; Jamal Rashid; Ivory Scott	Dissimulation	2020	
"Catch Me if You Can"	KSI	Olajide Olatunji; Gian Stone; Keegan Christopher Bach; Peter Fenn; Ryan Ogren; Billy Crabtree; Joseph Baxter; Kaine; Ray Michael Djan Jr. Stuart Hawkes	TBA	2025	
"Champagne"	KSI and Randolph	Olajide Olatunji; Andrew Shane; Zeeshan Azad	New Age	2019	
"Christmas Drillings"	Sidemen featuring Jme	Olajide Olatunji; Tobi Brown; Vikram Barn; Jamie Adenuga; Nyandoro Kelly	Non-album single	2022	
"Clean"	KSI and Randolph	Olajide Olatunji; Andrew Shane; Zeeshan Azad	New Age	2019	
"Complicated"	KSI	Olajide Olatunji; Sam Gumbley; Adnan Khan; Samuel Jimenez	Dissimulation (Deluxe edition)	2020	
"Creature"	KSI	Olajide Olatunji; Derek Safo; Charlie Cook; Tuna Erlat	Space	2017	
"Dirty"	KSI	Olajide Olatunji; Matt Zara; Andrew Jackson; Nicholas Gale; Stuart Hawkes; Geoff Swan	TBA	2024	
"Domain"	KSI	Olajide Olatunji; Sam Gumbley; Michalis Michael; Henkka Niemistö	Dissimulation	2020	
"Don't Play"	Anne-Marie, KSI and Digital Farm Animals	Anne-Marie Nicholson; Olajide Olatunji; Nicholas Gale; Mustafa Omer; James Murray; Andrew Murray; Sam Gumbley; Richard Boardman; Pablo Bowman	All Over the Place and Therapy	2021	
"Down Like That"	KSI featuring Rick Ross, Lil Baby and S-X	Olajide Olatunji; William Roberts II; Dominique Jones; Sam Gumbley; Byron Trice	Dissimulation	2019	
"Earthquake"	KSI featuring RiceGum	Olajide Olatunji; JaQuan Russell; Zeeshan Azad	Disstracktions	2017	
"Easy"	KSI, Bugzy Malone and R3hab	Olajide Olatunji; Aaron Daniel Davies; Fadil El Ghoul; Alexander Shuckburgh; Diego Avendano; Richard Preston Butler Jr.	TBA	2023	
"Encore"	KSI featuring Randolph	Olajide Olatunji; Andrew Shane; Zag Erlat	Keep Up	2016	
"Fine By Me"	Randolph featuring KSI	Andrew Shane; Olajide Olatunji	Lost Cause	2015	
"Flash It"	KSI featuring Rico Love	Olajide Olatunji; Richard Butler Jr. Donovan Bennett; Sam Gumbley	All Over The Place	2021	
"For the Summer"	Randolph featuring KSI	Andrew Shane; Olajide Olatunji	Non-album single	2016	
"Jimmy Neutron"	KSI	Olajide Olatunji; Adnan Khan; Mark Lwamusai	All Over The Place (Deluxe edition)	2021	
"Friends with Benefits"	KSI and MNDM	Olajide Olatunji; Derek Safo; Tumai Salih; Faried Jhauw; Charles Cook; Kris Coutinho	Jump Around	2016	
"Gang Gang"	KSI featuring Deno and Jay1	Olajide Olatunji; Jason Juami; Deno Mebrahitu; Ehijie Ohiomoba; Jacob Manson; Sam Gumbley	All Over The Place	2021	
"Goes Off"	KSI featuring Mista Silva	Olajide Olatunji; Derek Safo; Tuna Erlat	Jump Around	2016	
"Holiday"	KSI	Olajide Olatunji; Jake Gosling; Nicholas Gale; William Vaughan; Matthew Brettle; Geoff Swan; Niko Battistini; Joe LaPorta	All Over The Place	2021	
"Houdini"	KSI featuring Swarmz and Tion Wayne	Olajide Olatunji; Brandon Scott; Dennis Odunwo; Ehijie Ohiomoba; Jacob Manson; Emmanuel Isong	Dissimulation	2020	
"How It Feel"	KSI	Olajide Olatunji; Diego Avendano; Matt Campfield; Danny Klein; Westen Weiss; Blake Slatkin; Ivory Scott	Dissimulation	2020	
"IDGAF"	KSI	Olajide Olatunji; George Kodua	Space	2017	
"Jump Around"	KSI featuring Waka Flocka Flame	Olajide Olatunji; Juaquin Malphurs; Derek Safo; Tumai Salih; Charles Cook; Lawrence Muggerud; David Appell; Kal Mann	Jump Around	2016	
"Keep Up"	KSI featuring Jme	Olajide Olatunji; Jamie Adenuga; Derek Safo; Ellis Taylor	Keep Up	2015	
"Kilimanjaro"	KSI	Olajide Olatunji; Tuna Erlat; Derek Safo; Andrew Mutambira	Keep Up	2016	
"Killa Killa"	KSI featuring Aiyana-Lee	Olajide Olatunji; Diego Avendano; Yoshiya Ady; Tiina Vainikainen; William Rappaport	Dissimulation	2020	
"Know You"	KSI featuring S-X and A1 x J1	Olajide Olatunji; Sam Gumbley; Joshua Somerkun; Phinehas Waweru; Nicholas Gale	All Over the Place (Deluxe edition)	2021	
"Lamborghini"	KSI featuring P Money	Olajide Olatunji; Paris Moore-Williams; Tumai Salih; Derek Safo	Non-album single	2015	
"Leave Me Alone"	KSI	Olajide Olatunji; George Kodua	Space	2017	
"Lighter"	Nathan Dawe featuring KSI	Nathan Dawe; Olajide Olatunji; Gabriella Henderson; Tre Jean-Marie; Jonny Lattimer	Non-album single	2020	
"Little Bit of Fun"	KSI featuring Anne-Marie	Olajide Olatunji; Anne-Marie Nicholson; James Bell; Adrian McLeod; Abby Keen	All Over The Place (Deluxe edition)	2021	
"Little Boy"	KSI	Olajide Olatunji; Zeeshan Azad	Disstracktions	2017	
"Locked Out"	S-X featuring KSI	Sam Gumbley; Olajide Olatunji; Nicholas Gale; Ivory Scott; Deigo Ave; Nana Rogues	Things Change	2022	
"Lose"	KSI and Lil Wayne	Olajide Olatunji; Dwayne Michael Carter Jr. Benjamin Samama; Nicholas Gale	All Over The Place (Deluxe edition)	2021	
"Loose"	S1mba featuring KSI	Leonard Rwodzi; Olajide Olatunji; Tyler Hotston; Daniel Traynor	Good Time Long Time	2020	
"Low"	KSI	Olajide Olatunji; Henry Nichols; Nicholas Gale; Nicola Kollar; Sam Roman; Nike Taz; Pharaoh Vice; Stuart Hawkes; Koen Heldens	TBA	2024	
"MAC-10 Flow"	Sway featuring KSI	Derek Safo; Olajide Olatunji	Non-album single	2017	
"Madness"	KSI	Olajide Olatunji; Mozis Aduu; Sam Gumble	All Over The Place	2021	
"Medusa"	KSI	Olajide Olatunji; Zeeshan Azad; Derek Safo	Disstracktions	2017	
"Millions"	KSI	Olajide Olatunji; Yoshiya Ady; Alexander Krashinsky; Jonathan Gabor	Dissimulation	2020	
"Naruto Drillings (Remix)"	Offica and KSI	Tomas Adeyinka; Olajide Olatunji; Faruuq Salami	Non-album single	2019	
"New Age"	KSI and Randolph	Olajide Olatunji; Andrew Shane; Tuna Erlat	New Age	2019	
"Night To Remember"	KSI featuring S-X and Randolph	Olajide Olatunji; Sam Gumbley; Andrew Shane	Dissimulation (Deluxe edition)	2020	
"No Pressure"	KSI	Olajide Olatunji; Jahmere Tylon; Joseph Gosling	All Over The Place	2021	
"No Sleep"	Sway featuring KSI, Tiggs Da Author and Tubes	Derek Safo; Olajide Olatunji; Adam Muhabwa; Peter Dale; Tumai Salih; Drew Phantom	Wake Up	2013	
"No Time"	KSI featuring Lil Durk	Olajide Olatunji; Durk Banks; Diego Avendano; Sam Gumbley; Jamal Rashid; Joseph Chambers	All Over The Place	2021	
"Noob"	KSI	Olajide Olatunji; Derek Safo; Tuna Erlat; Skylar Mones; Andrew Mutambira	Disstracktions	2017	
"Number 2"	KSI featuring Future and 21 Savage	Olajide Olatunji; Nayvadius Wilburn; Shéyaa Bin Abraham-Joseph; Diego Avendano; Joel Banks; Taylor Banks; Jamal Rashid; Sam Gumbley; Richard Butler Jr. Ivory Scott; Aaron Ferrucci	All Over The Place	2021	
"Not Over Yet"	KSI featuring Tom Grennan	Olajide Olatunji; Thomas Grennan; Nicholas Gale; Sara Boe; Richard Boardman; Tom Holdings	TBA and What Ifs & Maybes	2022	
"On Point"	KSI	Olajide Olatunji; Justin Trugman; Nima Jahanbin; Paimon Jahanbin; Kes Ingoldsby; Derico Stefano Mpyo	Non-album single	2018	
"OP"	KSI	Olajide Olatunji; Daniel Smith	Jump Around	2016	
"Patience"	KSI featuring YUNGBLUD and Polo G	Olajide Olatunji; Dominic Harrison; Taurus Bartlett; Matt Schwartz; Nicholas Gale; George Tizzard; James Bell; Sam Gumbley; Diego Avendano; Yoshiya Ady; Peter Jideonwo	All Over The Place	2021	
"Player One"	P Money featuring Jme and KSI	Paris Moore-Williams; Jamie Adenuga; Olajide Olatunji; Silencer	Money Over Everyone 3	2019	
"Poppin"	KSI featuring Lil Pump and Smokepurpp	Olajide Olatunji; Gazzy Garcia; Omar Pineiro; Diego Avendano; Kevin Price; Jamal Rashid	Dissimulation	2020	
"Pull Up"	KSI featuring Jme	Olajide Olatunji; Jamie Adenuga; Richard Isong; Sammy Soso	New Age	2018	
"Punch Back"	5ive 9ine featuring KSI	Derek Safo; Olajide Olatunji	Non-album single	2018	
"Real Name"	KSI and Randolph featuring Talia Mar	Olajide Olatunji; Andrew Shane; Natalia Haddock; The Citrus Clouds	New Age	2019	
"Really Love"	KSI featuring Craig David and Digital Farm Animals	Olajide Olatunji; Craig David; Nicholas Gale; Mustafa Omer; James Murray; Uzoechi Emenike; Aminata Kabba; Ashley Livingstone; Paul Newman; Eugene Nwohia; Ronald Nwohia; Steve Wickham	All Over The Place	2020	
"Red Alert"	KSI and Randolph	Olajide Olatunji; Andrew Shane; Zeeshan Azad	New Age	2019	
"Rent Free"	KSI featuring Gracey	Olajide Olatunji; Grace Barker; Thomas Bell; Adrian McLeod	All Over The Place	2021	
"Silly"	KSI featuring Bugzy Malone	Olajide Olatunji; Aaron Davis; Ellis Taylor; Sam Gumbley	All Over The Place	2021	
"Sleeping With The Enemy"	KSI featuring S-X	Olajide Olatunji; Sam Gumbley; Yoshiya Ady; Dillon Deskin; William Egan IV	All Over The Place	2021	
"Slow Motion"	Randolph featuring KSI	Andrew Shane; Olajide Olatunji; Zeeshan Azad	New Age	2018	
"Smoke"	KSI featuring Nevve	Olajide Olatunji; Keely Bumford	All Over The Place (Deluxe edition)	2021	
"Smoke 'N' Mirrors"	KSI featuring Tigga Da Author, Lunar C and Nick Brewer	Olajide Olatunji; Adam Muhabwa; Jake Brook; Nick Brewer; Derek Safo; Tumai Salih	Keep Up	2016	
"So Far Away"	KSI featuring S-X	Olajide Olatunji; Sam Gumbley; Diego Ave; Lotto Ash; George Tizzard; Rick Parkhouse; Stuart Hawkes; Geoff Swan	TBA	2025	
"Sticks & Stones"	KSI featuring Arjun	Olajide Olatunji; Levi Niha; Charles Cook; Derek Safo	Jump Around	2016	
"Swerve"	Jay1 featuring KSI	Jason Juami; Olajide Olatunji; Raoul Chen; Bryan du Chantier	All Over The Place	2021	
"Stop Crying Your Heart Out"	BBC Radio 2 Allstars	Noel Gallagher	Non-album single	2020	
"Subzero"	RIL featuring KSI	Viddal Riley; Olajide Olatunji	Livin' Sports	2018	
"Summer Is Over"	KSI	Olajide Olatunji; Andrew James Bullimore; Nicholas Gale; Mams Taylor; Daniel Priddy; James Yami Bell	TBA	2022	
"The Gift"	Sidemen featuring S-X	Olajide Olatunji; Tobi Brown; Simon Minter; Joshua Bradley; Sam Gumbley	Non-album single	2019	
"The Moment"	KSI	Olajide Olatunji; Sam Gumbley	All Over The Place	2021	
"Thick of It"	KSI featuring Trippie Redd	Olajide Olatunji; Michael Lamar White IV; Ray Michael Djan Jr. Anthony Kiedis; Billy Crabtree; Flea; John Frusciante; Joseph Baxter; Miles Gould; Vivan Proton Bellinfantie; Stuart Hawkes; Geoff Swan	TBA	2024	
"Tides"	KSI featuring AJ Tracey and Rich The Kid	Olajide Olatunji; Ché Grant; Dimitri Roger; Diego Avendano; Jamal Rashid; Samuel Ahana; Paul Magnet; Ivory Scott	Dissimulation (Deluxe edition)	2020	
"Tommy Gun"	KSI	Olajide Olatunji; Tuna Erlat	Space	2017	
"Touch Down"	KSI featuring Stefflon Don	Olajide Olatunji; Stephanie Allen; Tuna Erlat; Andrew Shane	Jump Around and Baywatch (Music from the Motion Picture)	2016	
"Transforming"	KSI	Olajide Olatunji; Sammy Soso	Space	2017	
"Two Birds One Stone"	KSI	Olajide Olatunji; Zeeshan Azad	Disstracktions	2017	
"Uncontrollable"	KSI featuring Big Zuu	Olajide Olatunji; Zuhair Hassan; Zeeshan Azad	Non-album single	2018	
"Undefeated"	KSI	Olajide Olatunji; Diego Avendano; Justin Howze	Dissimulation	2020	
"Voices"	KSI featuring Oliver Tree	Olajide Olatunji; Oliver Tree; Nicholas Gale; James Murray; Mustafa Omer; Conor Blake Manning; Sara Boe; Stuart Hawkes; Trey Station; Anthony Vilchils; Zach Pereyra; Manny Marroquin; Marc Fineman; Will Vaughan	TBA	2023	
"Wake Up Call"	KSI featuring Trippie Redd	Olajide Olatunji; Michael White IV; Sam Gumbley; Jamal Rashid; Mams Taylor; Byron Trice; William Rappaport	Dissimulation	2020	
"Wanna Be"	Sway featuring KSI	Derek Safo; Olajide Olatunji	The Deliverance	2015	
"What You Been On"	KSI	Olajide Olatunji; Diego Avendano; Jeff Gitelman; Ivory Scott	Dissimulation	2020	
"World Cup Song"	Joe Weller featuring KSI and Randolph	Joe Weller; Olajide Olatunji; Andrew Shane	Non-album single	2013	
"You"	KSI	Olajide Olatunji; Nicholas Gale; Mustafa Omer; James Murray; Sam Gumbley; Richard Butler Jr.	All Over The Place	2021	

== See also ==
- KSI discography
