= S-X production discography =

The following list is a discography of production by S-X, a British singer, songwriter and record producer. It includes a list of songs produced, co-produced and remixed by year, artist, album and title.

List of songs produced or written, with performing artists, showing year released and album name
Title	Year	Artist	Credits	Certifications	Album
"Big" (featuring Chip)	2011	Skepta	Producer		Doin' It Again
"Fuck Them"	2012	Dappy	Producer		Bad Intentions
"I'm Coming (Tarzan Part 2)"	2012	Dappy	Producer		Bad Intentions
"My Crew" (featuring Skepta)	2012	Chip	Producer		London Boy
"Hustle Gang" (featuring T.I. and Iggy Azalea)	2012	Chip	Producer		London Boy
"Official" (featuring Wretch 32, Blade Brown and Parker Ighile)	2012	Chip	Producer		London Boy
"Hold Ya Head"	2013	Kevin Gates	Producer		The Luca Brasi Story
"Tapout" (featuring Lil Wayne, Birdman, Mack Maine, Nicki Minaj and Future)	2013	Rich Gang	Producer	RIAA: Gold	Rich Gang
"Fly Rich" (featuring Birdman, Stevie J, Future, Tyga, Meek Mill and Mystikal)	2013	Rich Gang	Producer		Rich Gang
"No Bueno"	2013	Angel Haze	Producer		Non-album single
"I. The Worst Guys" (featuring Chance the Rapper)	2013	Childish Gambino	Producer		Because the Internet
"We Alright" (featuring Euro, Birdman and Lil Wayne)	2014	Young Money	Producer		Young Money: Rise of an Empire
"Tina Turn Up Needs A Tune Up"	2014	Lil Wayne	Producer		Non-album single
"Mazinger" (featuring PJ)	2014	Lupe Fiasco	Producer		Non-album single
"Fall"	2015	Lupe Fiasco	Producer		Tetsuo & Youth
"Bookey"	2015	Chip	Producer		Believe & Achieve: Episode 2
"Gone Clear"	2016	Bugzy Malone	Producer		Facing Time
"NGL" (featuring Ty Dolla $ign)	2017	Lupe Fiasco	Producer		Drogas Light
"We Don't Play"	2017	Bugzy Malone	Producer		King of the North
"Balance" (featuring Shakes)	2017	MC Quakez	Producer		Non-album single
"Down Like That" (featuring Rick Ross, Lil Baby and S-X)	2019	KSI	Featured artist, songwriter, producer	BPI: Silver	Dissimulation
"The Gift" (featuring S-X)	2019	Sidemen	Featured artist, songwriter, producer		Non-album single
"Paintings Freestyle"	2019	Randolph	Producer		Going Clear
"Wake Up Call" (featuring Trippie Redd)	2020	KSI	Songwriter, producer	BPI: Silver	Dissimulation
"You Watch Me"	2020	Jme	Producer		Grime MC
"Domain"	2020	KSI	Producer		Dissimulation
"Complicated"	2020	KSI	Producer		Dissimulation
"Night To Remember" (featuring Randolph and S-X)	2020	KSI	Featured artist, songwriter, producer		Dissimulation
"Don't Play" (with KSI and Digital Farm Animals)	2021	Anne-Marie	Songwriter	BPI: Platinum	Therapy
"Patience" (featuring Yungblud and Polo G)	2021	KSI	Songwriter	BPI: Gold	All Over the Place
"The Moment"	2021	KSI	Songwriter, producer		All Over the Place
"You"	2021	KSI	Songwriter		All Over the Place
"Gang Gang" (featuring Deno and Jay1)	2021	KSI	Songwriter		All Over the Place
"Madness"	2021	KSI	Songwriter		All Over the Place
"Silly" (featuring Bugzy Malone)	2021	KSI	Songwriter		All Over the Place
"Flash It" (featuring Rico Love)	2021	KSI	Songwriter		All Over the Place
"No Time" (featuring Lil Durk)	2021	KSI	Songwriter, producer		All Over the Place
"Sleeping With The Enemy" (featuring S-X)	2021	KSI	Featured artist, songwriter, producer		All Over the Place
"Lose" (with Lil Wayne)	2021	KSI	Songwriter		All Over the Place
"Know You" (featuring S-X and A1 x J1)	2021	KSI	Featured artist, songwriter, producer		All Over the Place
