= Uncontrollable =

2018 single by KSI featuring Big Zuu

Single by KSI featuring Big Zuu
- Released: 2 February 2018
- Genre: British hip hop; grime
- Length: 4:19
- Label: RBC; BMG (Note: "Uncontrollable" has been licensed to RBC Records and BMG, since October 2019 after KSI signed with the record label.)
- Songwriters: Olajide Olatunji; Zuhair Hassan; Zeeshan Azad
- Producer: Zeeshan

KSI singles chronology
"Creature" (2017)	"Uncontrollable" (2018)	"Slow Motion" (2018)

Big Zuu singles chronology
"Blatant Truth" (2018)	"Uncontrollable" (2018)	"B.I.G" (2018)

Music video
- "Uncontrollable" on YouTube

"Uncontrollable" is a song by British YouTuber and rapper KSI. The song features a guest appearance from British rapper Big Zuu. It was independently released for digital download and streaming on 2 February 2018 in the build up to KSI's impending amateur boxing match against British YouTuber Joe Weller. The song was used as KSI's entrance music for the boxing match, held on 3 February 2018 at the Copper Box Arena in London, which KSI went on to win via technical knockout in the third round. The music video was released on 31 January 2018. The black and white video places the two rappers in the gritty underground scene of the boxing world.

== Background ==
In August 2017, it was announced that KSI would fight against British YouTuber Joe Weller in an amateur boxing match, dubbed KSI vs. Joe Weller, to be held on 3 February 2018 at the Copper Box Arena in London, England. The pair held a press conference to promote the fight on 9 September 2017.

== Release and promotion ==
On 31 January 2018, the song's title, featured artist, cover art and release date were revealed and the song was made available to pre-order on digital download services and pre-save on streaming services. "Uncontrollable" was independently released for digital download and streaming on 2 February 2018. The day after its release, on 3 February 2018, "Uncontrollable" was used as KSI's entrance music for his boxing match against Weller, which KSI went on to win via technical knockout in the third round. KSI and Big Zuu will perform "Uncontrollable" during The KSI Show on 17 July 2021.

The KSI song really propelled me into a different light. My fanbase proper grew because he gave me a chance. His fight [against Joe Weller] was the biggest white collar boxing fight of all time and my song with him is [his] walk out music [for the fight]. So I've got a song that's the walk out music to the biggest white collar fight in history... And it helped me [because] I had a platform to show everyone what I'm on.

— Big Zuu speaking on collaborating with KSI.

== Critical reception ==
Jon Powell of Respect called "Uncontrollable" a "hard-hitting cut". Nic Coaker of GRM Daily commented, "Whilst KSI has been building up a following from urban music fans over the past few years with his efforts of a rapping career, bringing Big Zuu onto a track is definitely going to have some of the grime fans in favour of him."

== Music video ==
The music video for "Uncontrollable" was directed by Rvbberduck. It was released to KSI's YouTube channel two days before the release of the song on 31 January 2018. It has received over 30 million views. The video is shot in black and white and it places KSI and Big Zuu in the gritty underground scene of the boxing world. In the music video, KSI publicly reveals his body transformation for his boxing match against Weller for the first time. KSI alluded to this on 25 January 2018, tweeting, "January 31st is gonna be the day a lot of people will know this ain't no joke." Nic Coaker of GRM Daily called the music video "energetic".

== Credits and personnel ==
Credits adapted from Tidal.

- KSI – songwriting, vocals
- Big Zuu – songwriting, vocals
- Zeeshan – production, songwriting
- Charlie Cook – engineering

== Charts ==
Chart performance for "Uncontrollable"
Chart (2018)	Peak position
Scotland (OCC)	85
UK Singles (OCC)	89
UK Singles Downloads (OCC)	65
UK Indie (OCC)	11

== Release history ==
Release dates and formats for "Uncontrollable"
Region	Date	Format(s)	Label(s)	Ref.
Various	2 February 2018	Digital download; streaming	Self-released	
