= Disstracktions (KSI EP) =

2017 extended play by KSI

EP by KSI
- Released: 29 September 2017
- Genre: Hip hop
- Length: 19:01
- Labels: Island; Universal
- Producers: Andrew Mutambira; New Reign; Sway; ZAGOR; Zeeshan

KSI chronology
Space (2017)	Disstracktions (2017)	New Age (2019)

Disstracktions is the fourth extended play (EP) by British YouTuber and rapper KSI. It was released via Island and Universal on 29 September 2017 and features KSI's disstracks on Behzinga, W2S, Joe Weller and NetNobody. The EP features a sole guest appearance from RiceGum. Whilst four of the songs were released via YouTube they were not released on streaming platforms until the release of Disstracktions. "Disstracktions" would also mark KSI's final release with Island Records.

== Background ==
KSI uploaded "Earthquke", a disstrack aimed at Behzinga, featuring Ricegum on 12 August 2017. This was in response to Behzinga's disstrack, "Drama" on him, uploaded on 7 August 2017. KSI deleted the disstrack from his channel.

"Little Boy", a disstrack aimed at W2S, was uploaded on 14 August 2017. The track was a response to W2S's disstrack "KSI Sucks". As of July 2025 "Little Boy" has 68 Million views.

"Two Birds, One Stone", a disstrack at W2S and Joe Weller, was released 24 August 2017. The track was a response to W2S's second disstrack "KSI Exposed" and to build hype against his amateur boxing bout against Weller. As of July 2025 "Two Birds, One Stone" has 29 Millions views.

"Adam's Apple", a disstrack aimed at SkyDoesMinecraft (also known as NetNobody), was released 8 September 2017. The track was in response to NetNobody's disstrack on him. As of July 2025 "Adam's Apple" has 32 Million views.

== Track listing ==
Disstracktions track listing
No.	Title	Writer(s)	Producer(s)	Length
1.	"Little Boy"	Olajide Olatunji; Zeeshan	Zeeshan	2:20
2.	"Two Birds, One Stone"	Olatunji; Zeeshan	Zeeshan	3:17
3.	"Earthquake" (featuring RiceGum)	Olatunji; JaQuan Russell; Zeeshan	Zeeshan	3:31
4.	"Medusa"	Olatunji; Derek Safo; Zeeshan	Sway; Zeeshan	3:30
5.	"Noob"	Olatunji; Safo; ZAGOR; New Reign; Tuna Erlat; Natalia Haddock	SWay; ZAGOR; New Reign; Tuna Erlat	3:46
6.	"Adam's Apple"	Olatunji; Zeeshan	Zeeshan	2:44
Total length:				19:01

== Charts ==
Chart performance for Disstracktions
Chart (2018)	Peak position
UK Albums Chart (OCC)	31
UK R&B Albums Chart (OCC)	1
