= Space (KSI EP) =

2017 extended play by KSI

EP by KSI
- Released: 30 June 2017
- Genre: Hip hop, Alternative rap
- Length: 20:31
- Label: RBC; BMG (Note: "On Point" has been licensed to RBC Records and BMG since October 2019 after KSI signed with the record label.)
- Producer: Zagor; Sway; Charles Cook; GK Beats; Sammy Soso

KSI chronology
Jump Around (2016)	Space (2017)	Disstracktions (2017)

Singles from Space
- 1. "Creature" Released: 23 June 2017

Space is the third extended play (EP) by British YouTuber and rapper KSI. It was independently released for digital download and streaming on 30 June 2017. The EP was preceded by its first and only single, "Creature".

== Background ==
In February 2017, KSI "blacked out" all of his YouTube and social media accounts, as well as deleting around 600 YouTube videos, worth over two billion views, and deleting all of his social media posts. On 23 February 2017, in an interview with DramaAlert, KSI explained his actions, confirming that he wasn't "promoting anything". He continued to say that he doesn't "care about the fame or the money" and he is "sick of trying to portray himself as a certain thing which he isn't", describing himself as being "a clown for many years". He confirmed that he would not be uploading to YouTube for the foreseeable future.

Speaking to GRM Daily in July 2017 about his break from YouTube, KSI said, "I feel like with the whole KSI thing, it was sick don't get me wrong, I've enjoyed making all these videos, entertaining people, making people laugh and all that. But it's kind of to the point where I've been there, done that, now I wanna do what I wanna do. I felt like an evolution was needed to prove to people that I can do what I feel is necessary in my life, and that was the same feeling with this whole Space EP. I just wanted it to be truthful. I want people to actually see how I was feeling from my eyes about what I was going through". He continued, "I think it was near the end of last year when I was doing a book, a movie, dropped an EP, lots of youtube videos, I was just doing so much it got to the point where I started getting stressed and it really started to hinder me. I started getting ill and everything. It was just a bit too much and I was like "yo, right now what do I wanna do with myself?""

== Promotion and release ==
Space was independently released for digital download and streaming on 30 June 2017.

=== Singles ===
"Creature" was released as the Lead single from the EP on 23 June 2017. An accompanying music video for the song was released on 27 June 2017.

== Track listing ==
Space track listing
No.	Title	Writer(s)	Producer(s)	Length
1.	"Tommy Gun"	Olajide Olatunji; Tuna Erlat	Zagor	1:52
2.	"Creature"	Olatunji; Derek Safo; Erlat; Charles Cook	Sway; Zagor; Charles Cook	3:27
3.	"Leave Me Alone"	Olatunji; George Kodua	GK Beats	3:31
4.	"Idgaf"	Olatunji; Kodua	GK Beats	4:00
5.	"64 Impala"	Olatunji; Erlat	Zagor	3:12
6.	"Transforming"	Olatunji; Sammy Soso	Sammy Soso	4:29
Total length:				20:31

== Credits and personnel ==
Credits adapted from Tidal.

- KSI – songwriting (all tracks), vocals (all tracks)
- DJ Turkish – engineering (all tracks)
- Zagor – production (1, 2, 5), songwriting (1, 2, 5)
- Oscar LoBrutto – engineering (1, 5)
- Sway – production (2), songwriting (2)
- Charles Cook – production (2), songwriting (2), engineering (3, 4, 6)
- GK Beats – production (3, 4), songwriting (3, 4)
- Sammy Soso – production (6), songwriting (6)

== Charts ==
Chart performance for Space
Chart (2016)	Peak position
New Zealand Heatseeker Albums (RMNZ)	6
Scottish Albums (OCC)	87
UK Album Downloads (OCC)	19

== Release history ==
Release dates and formats for Space
Region	Date	Format(s)	Label	Ref.
Various	30 June 2017	Digital download; streaming	Self-released	
