= Locked Out (S-X song) =

2022 single by S-X and KSI

Single by S-X featuring KSI

from the album Things change
- Released: 6 May 2022
- Genre: Hip hop
- Label: RBC; BMG
- Songwriters: Sam Gumbley; Olajide Olatunji; Nicholas Gale; Ivory Scott; Deigo Ave; Nana Rogues
- Producer: Digital Farm Animals

S-X singles chronology
"All Night" (2022)	"Locked Out" (2022)	"It's Over Now" (2022)

KSI singles chronology
"Lose" (2021)	"Locked Out" (2022)	"Not Over Yet" (2022)

Music video
- "Locked Out" on YouTube

"Locked Out" is a song by British singer-songwriter S-X featuring British YouTuber and rapper KSI. The single is the third single from his debut studio album, things change. The song was written by the two artists alongside Ivory Scott, Deigo Ave, Nana Rogues, and producer Digital Farm Animals. It was released for digital download and streaming by RBC Records and BMG on 6 May 2022 as the third single from the album.

== Background ==
The song serves as the fifth collaboration between S-X and KSI following their first collaboration on KSI's "Down Like That" and subsequent quest appearances on both KSI's albums with "Night To Remember" on Dissimulation deluxe edition, "Sleeping With The Enemy" on All Over the Place and "Know You" on the deluxe edition alongside A1 x J1.

== Release and promotion ==
On 29 April 2022 both S-X and KSI released a teaser video on their social medias announcing that they are collaborating on a new single.

== Critical reception ==
Upon release, Carl Smith from the Official Charts Company released a review stating that "Serving pulsating '80s-inspired synths from the off, Locked Out asserts itself as a song that is on-trend while avoiding imitation. This is a track totally in its own lane as S-X cements his own hybrid brand of hip-hop and R&B alt-pop, from its production flourishes to vulnerable lyrical themes."

== Music video ==
A music video premiered to S-X's YouTube channel nine hours after the song on 6 May 2022 directed by Torey Roscoe who in the past has directed music videos for both S-X and KSI.
