= Holiday (KSI song) =

2021 song by KSI

Single by KSI

from the album All Over the Place
- Released: 18 June 2021
- Genre: Pop
- Length: 3:13
- Label: RBC; BMG
- Songwriters: Olajide Olatunji; Jake Gosling; Nicholas Gale; William Vaughan
- Producers: Digital Farm Animals; Jake Gosling

KSI singles chronology
"Patience" (2021)	"Holiday" (2021)	"Swerve" (2021)

Music video
- "Holiday" on YouTube

"Holiday" is a song by British YouTuber and rapper KSI, from his second studio album, All Over the Place (2021). It was written by KSI, alongside its producers Jake Gosling, Digital Farm Animals and William Vaughan. The song was released for digital download and streaming by RBC Records and BMG on 18 June 2021 as the fourth single from the album. An accompanying music video was released on the same day. "Holiday" is a folk-tinged, midtempo pop song which reflects on the honeymoon period of a relationship.

"Holiday" debuted at number two on the UK Singles Chart and it has been certified platinum by the British Phonographic Industry (BPI) for exceeding sales of 600,000 units in the UK. The song additionally entered the music charts of Australia, Canada, Denmark, Iceland, India, Lithuania, the Netherlands, New Zealand, Norway, the Republic of Ireland, Singapore, Sweden & the United States. "Holiday" was nominated for the BRIT Award for Song of the Year at the 2022 ceremony.

== Critical reception ==
Rob Copsey of the Official Charts Company described the song as a reflection "on the honeymoon period of a relationship" and a "hopeful, folk-tinged midtempo" track.

== Commercial performance ==
The song debuted at number two on the UK Singles Chart dated 25 June 2021, making it the highest-placed new entry of that week and his 7th top ten hit.

== Track listing ==
Digital download
No.	Title	Length
1.	"Holiday"	3:13

Digital download – A7S Remix
No.	Title	Length
1.	"Holiday (A7S Remix)"	2:45

== Awards and nominations ==
Awards and nominations for "Holiday"
Year	Award	Category	Result	Ref.
2022	The BRIT Awards	Best British Single	Nominated	

== Credits and personnel ==
Credits adapted from Tidal.

- KSI – songwriting, vocals, hand clap
- Jake Gosling – production, songwriting, drums, keyboard, hand clap, percussion, programming
- Digital Farm Animals – songwriting, backing vocals, hand clap, percussion
- William Vaughan – songwriting, electric guitar
- Matthew Brettle – drums, guitar, percussion, programming, engineering
- Geoff Swan – engineering
- Niko Battistini – engineering
- Joe LaPorta – engineering

== Charts ==
=== Weekly charts ===
Weekly chart performance for "Holiday"
Chart (2021)	Peak position
Australia (ARIA)	24
Canada Hot 100 (Billboard)	57
Denmark (Tracklisten)	33
Euro Digital Song Sales (Billboard)	3
Global 200 (Billboard)	79
Iceland (Tónlistinn)	32
India International (IMI)	10
Ireland (IRMA)	2
Latvia (Latvijas Radio Top 40)	8
Lebanon Airplay (Lebanese Top 20)	12
Lithuania (AGATA)	87
Netherlands (Single Tip)	1
New Zealand (Recorded Music NZ)	16
Norway (VG-lista)	26
Singapore (RIAS)	8
Sweden (Sverigetopplistan)	97
UK Singles (OCC)	2
UK Indie (OCC)	1

=== Year-end charts ===
Year-end chart performance for "Holiday"
Chart (2021)	Position
UK Singles (OCC)	57

== Certifications ==
Certifications for "Holiday"
Region	Certification	Certified units/sales
New Zealand (RMNZ)	Platinum	30,000^{‡}
Norway (IFPI Norway)	Gold	30,000^{‡}
United Kingdom (BPI)	Platinum	600,000^{‡}
^{‡} Sales+streaming figures based on certification alone.

== Release history ==
Release dates and formats for "Holiday"
Region	Date	Format(s)	Version	Label(s)	Ref.
Various	18 June 2021	Digital download; streaming	Original	RBC; BMG	
Various	5 July 2021	Digital download; streaming	A7S Remix	RBC; BMG	
