= Really Love (KSI song) =

2020 song by KSI featuring Craig David and Digital Farm Animals

Single by KSI featuring Craig David and Digital Farm Animals

from the album All Over the Place
- Released: 23 October 2020
- Genre: UK garage; dance-pop
- Length: 2:57
- Label: RBC; BMG
- Songwriters: Olajide Olatunji; Craig David; Nicholas Gale; Mustafa Omer; James Murray; Uzoechi Emenike; Aminata Kabba; Ashley Livingstone; Paul Newman; Eugene Nwohia; Ronald Nwohia; Steve Wickham
- Producers: Digital Farm Animals; Mojam

KSI singles chronology
"Loose" (2020)	"Really Love" (2020)	"Don't Play" (2021)

Craig David singles chronology
"Do You Miss Me Much" (2019)	"Really Love" (2020)	"Who You Are" (2021)

Digital Farm Animals singles chronology
"Undo My Heart" (2020)	"Really Love" (2020)	"Home Sweet Home" (2020)

Music video
- "Really Love" on YouTube

"Really Love" is a song by British YouTuber and rapper KSI from his second studio album, All Over the Place. The song features guest vocals from British singer-songwriter Craig David and production from British DJ and record producer Digital Farm Animals. It was released for digital download and streaming by RBC Records and BMG on 23 October 2020 as the lead single from the album. A UK garage and dance-pop track, its lyrics describe the confusion and misunderstanding of love and question whether the love that one is experiencing is real.

"Really Love" received positive reviews from music critics, who commonly praised David's infectious chorus and KSI's confident and energetic verses. The song charted at number three in the United Kingdom, where it has been certified platinum by the British Phonographic Industry (BPI), and further charted in seven other countries. An accompanying music video was released on 23 October 2020. The winter-themed video stars the three artists, dressed in full winter gear, at a ski resort.

== Writing and production ==
"Really Love" was co-produced by British DJ and record producer Digital Farm Animals and British record production duo Mojam. The chorus was co-written by British singer-songwriters MNEK and KABBA. They gave the chorus to KSI, who wrote and recorded two verses for "Really Love". Being a UK garage track, KSI "thought it made sense" to ask British singer-songwriter Craig David to perform the chorus. KSI recalled, "We [sent the track] to Craig, hoping [that] he'd say yes. And he gave a resounding yes." David recalled, "[KSI] reached out to me [and said], 'I've got this song that I think you'd be perfect on.' And I was like, 'Yeah, I'd be well up for it. Let me hear the song.' I heard it and I was like, 'Bro, this is a tune.' So I jumped on it that [same] night [and] vocalled it. I was going back and forth with [KSI], asking him, 'What [do you] think?' And he was so on it."

Speaking on collaborating with David, KSI said, "To say [that] I’m excited is a complete understatement. I’m still in disbelief. I’m working with Craig David; a childhood hero of mine." KSI continued, "I saw him perform last year at Ibiza Rocks and he was amazing. I was in awe of seeing him perform. It was cool to finally be able to make a song with him. I didn't even think I'd be able to make a song with him." KSI affirmed, "We just clicked... It was so easy [to work with him]. He's the nicest guy and a lot of fun to work with." Reflecting on the collaboration, David said, "Working with KSI has been an amazing experience for me and also a lot of fun. He’s a great guy with an amazing energy." David affirmed, "I just really appreciate the fact that [KSI] called me to say, 'Would you jump on this?' I know about [his] career and what he's done, [so] I was like, 'Wow, man. You've got such a huge fan base and you've drawn for me for this record.'" When asked if they would work together again in the future, both artists expressed interest; David said, "[I'd] love too", and KSI said, "Of course. Of course... I'm excited to do more in the future if that ever happens." Regarding the involvement of MNEK, KSI said, "It was a match made in heaven. And his energy is amazing. He's the nicest guy ever."

The song interpolates the guitar hook of "Do You Really Like It?" by DJ Pied Piper and the Masters of Ceremonies. All members are therefore credited as co-songwriters on "Really Love".

== Music and lyrics ==
"Really Love"
A 15-second sample of the chorus, performed by Craig David. He delivers the chorus in a falsetto vocal register, over an old-school UK garage-inspired instrumental.

"Really Love" is an uptempo UK garage and dance-pop track. It has been described as a throwback track to the original, old-school UK garage vibe. David performs the chorus, which he delivers in a falsetto vocal register. KSI raps two energetic verses, over bass-heavy beats.

The song's lyrics combine the emotions of love and uncertainty to analyse if love really is love. David's chorus describes the confusion and misunderstanding of love, as he questions whether the love that he is experiencing is really love, while KSI raps about a liberating and carefree method of finding out whether the love that he is experiencing is real. Speaking on the meaning of "Really Love", David explained, "[KSI] was saying that it's more about the friendship zone and trying to find out if someone [is] into [you]. From my side, it's [about] putting out the message of when you're really into somebody and you're a bit vulnerable. You've never felt this feeling before. So you're sort of checking in with yourself, like, 'Is it really love? Why am I thinking about this person all the time.' It's nice that we both have slightly different takes on the same chorus." KSI has labelled "Really Love" as "a winter anthem" due to its winter-time release.

== Release and promotion ==
On 7 October 2020, KSI revealed via Twitter that he would soon be releasing a new single. Two days later, KSI announced via social media that the song is titled "Really Love" and features Craig David and Digital Farm Animals, and the song was made available to pre-order on digital download services and pre-save on streaming services. "Really Love" was released for digital download and streaming by RBC Records and BMG on 23 October 2020 as the lead single from KSI's upcoming second studio album. The song's cover art shows a cartoon illustration of a girl stood in front of a pinball machine, in front of a blue sky and white clouds. The song was accompanied by the release of a lyric video to Craig David's YouTube channel on the same day.

KSI, David and Digital Farm Animals performed "Really Love" in a live performance video that was released to KSI's YouTube channel on 30 October 2020. The three artists performed "Really Love" on ITV's The Jonathan Ross Show on 31 October 2020. They also performed the song at the KISS Haunted House Party on 31 October 2020. "Really Love" was performed by the three artists on BBC One's Top of the Pops Christmas Special, which aired on 25 December 2020. Several Remixes of "Really Love" have been released. A remix by British DJ and record producer Blinkie was released on 13 November 2020. A remix by Digital Farm Animals that features new verses by British rappers Tinie Tempah and Yxng Bane was announced and made available for pre-order on 19 November 2020 and released one day later. An audio video for this remix was released to KSI's YouTube channel on the same day. A remix by Moroccan-Dutch DJ and record producer R3hab that features a new verse by Jamaican rapper Sean Paul was released on 12 December 2020. An audio video for this remix was released to KSI's YouTube channel on the same day.

== Critical reception ==
"Really Love" was met with positive reviews from music critics. GRM Daily's Jade Dadalica called "Really Love" a "care-free and enjoyable [song] with some catchy melodies and rhythms". She remarked that the song "will make it feel as if summer is still here". Dadalica liked David's "smooth and infectious chorus" and she observed that "KSI delivers some confident and witty bars, bringing his well-known humour into his music". Dadalica acclaimed, "[KSI proves that] he has discovered his sound in recent times." GRM Daily's Courtney Wynter liked how "KSI steers away from his usual hip hop inspired sound and takes on [a] house-infused production". Wynter praised KSI's "fun lyrics" and David's "affectionate chorus". Writing for Stereoboard, Laura Johnson praised David's "melodic chorus". In their review, the staff of InCeleb called the song "uplifting" and proclaimed that it "will be known as a party anthem to dance in the club to". Rowan Faife of Reader's Digest remarked that "having Craig David on [the] song immediately turns it [into] a noughties garage track".

== Music video ==
The music video for "Really Love" was directed by Troy Roscoe. It premiered on KSI's YouTube channel on 23 October 2020 at 15:00 UTC. A behind-the-scenes video of the music video shoot was released to the channel on 9 November 2020. On 24 October 2020, KSI released a reaction video, in which he watches and reacts to the music video, followed by another reaction video, in which he is joined by David and Digital Farm Animals, being released on 26 October 2020.

The winter-themed music video stars the three artists, dressed in full winter gear, at a ski resort. It makes heavy use of computer-generated imagery (CGI) and Chroma key compositing. The video opens with shots of David on top of a snowy mountain, before KSI climbs up the side of the mountain. This is followed by David riding a snowmobile through the mountains and shots of the three artists inside a large ice cube. Other scenes include KSI chipping away at a large block of ice with an ice pick, carving out the word "SDMN", and shots of KSI and David petting husky dogs. Towards the end of the video, the three artists are accompanied by a crowd of people, living their best lives and dancing inside a log cabin. The staff of Sports Playlists described the music video as "a mesmerising VFX movie [that takes] fans into an icy universe".

== Commercial performance ==
In the United Kingdom, "Really Love" was the country's most downloaded song in its first week of release. It was the second highest new entry on the UK Singles Chart, debuting at number three, becoming Craig David's 16th, KSI's 4th and Digital Farm Animals' 2nd top 10 hit. The song debuted at number two on the UK Dance Singles Chart and remained at that position for six weeks, being held off the top spot by Joel Corry and MNEK's track "Head & Heart" (2020). On 26 July 2024, "Really Love" was certified platinum by the British Phonographic Industry (BPI) for sales of 600,000 track-equivalent units in the UK.

In Ireland, "Really Love" debuted at number 18 on the Irish Singles Chart and spent a total of 16 weeks on the chart. Elsewhere in Europe, "Really Love" charted at number 25 on the Hungary Singles Chart and number 87 on the Romania Airplay 100. In the United States, "Really Love" debuted at number 17 on the Hot Dance/Electronic Songs chart and spent a total of 11 weeks on the chart.

== Credits and personnel ==
Credits adapted from Tidal.

- KSI – songwriting, vocals
- Craig David – songwriting, vocals
- Digital Farm Animals – production, songwriting
- Mojam – production, songwriting
- MNEK – songwriting
- KABBA – songwriting
- Adam Lunn – engineering
- Kevin Grainger – engineering
- DJ Pied Piper and the Masters of Ceremonies – songwriting

== Charts ==
Chart performance for "Really Love"
Chart (2020–2021)	Peak position
Australia Digital Tracks (ARIA)	32
Euro Digital Song Sales (Billboard)	2
Global Excl. US (Billboard)	111
Hungary (Single Top 40)	25
Ireland (IRMA)	18
New Zealand Hot Singles (RMNZ)	7
Romania (Airplay 100)	87
Scotland Singles (OCC)	2
UK Singles (OCC)	3
UK Dance (OCC)	2
UK Indie (OCC)	1
US Hot Dance/Electronic Songs (Billboard)	17

== Certifications ==
Certifications for "Really Love"
Region	Certification	Certified units/sales
United Kingdom (BPI)	Platinum	600,000^{‡}
^{‡} Sales+streaming figures based on certification alone.

== Release history ==
Release dates and formats for "Really Love"
Region	Date	Format(s)	Version	Label(s)	Ref.
Various	23 October 2020	Digital download; streaming	Original	RBC; BMG	
United Kingdom	23 October 2020	Contemporary hit radio	Original	RBC; BMG	
Various	13 November 2020	Digital download; streaming	Blinkie Remix	RBC; BMG	
Various	20 November 2020	Digital download; streaming	Digital Farm Animals Remix	RBC; BMG	
Various	12 December 2020	Digital download; streaming	R3HAB Remix	RBC; BMG	

== See also ==
- List of UK top-ten singles in 2020
- List of UK Singles Downloads Chart number ones of the 2020s
- List of UK Independent Singles Chart number ones of 2020
