= Gang Gang (KSI song) =

2021 song by KSI featuring Jay1 and Deno

Song by KSI featuring Jay1 and Deno

from the album All Over the Place
- Released: 16 July 2021
- Genre: UK rap; afroswing
- Length: 2:43
- Label: RBC; BMG
- Songwriters: Olajide Olatunji; Jason Juami; Deno Mebrahitu; Ehijie Ohiomoba; Jacob Manson; Emmanuel Isong; Sam Gumbley
- Producers: AJ Productions; Jacob Manson

"Gang Gang" is a song by British YouTuber and rapper KSI from his second studio album, All Over the Place (2021). It was co-produced by AJ Productions and Jacob Manson, and featured guest appearances from British artists Jay1 and Deno. The song premiered in Fortnite in June 2021 and was later released for digital download and streaming by RBC Records and BMG on 16 July 2021. "Gang Gang" debuted at number 40 on the UK Singles Chart and number 53 on the Irish Singles Chart.

== Credits and personnel ==
Credits adapted from Tidal.

- KSI – songwriting, vocals
- Jay1 – songwriting, vocals
- Deno – songwriting, vocals
- AJ Productions – production, songwriting
- Jacob Manson – production, songwriting
- Eight9FLY – songwriting
- S-X – songwriting
- Adam Lunn – engineering
- Joe LaPorta – engineering
- Kevin Grainger – engineering
- Matt Schwartz – engineering
- Niko Marzouca – engineering
- Rob MacFarlane – engineering
- Robert Marks – engineering

== Charts ==
Chart performance for "Gang Gang"
| Chart (2021) | Peak position |
|---|---|
| Ireland (IRMA) | 53 |
| New Zealand Hot Singles (RMNZ) | 19 |
| UK Singles (OCC) | 40 |

== Release history ==
Release dates and formats for "Gang Gang"
| Region | Date | Format(s) | Label(s) | Ref. |
|---|---|---|---|---|
| Various | 16 July 2021 | Digital download; streaming | RBC; BMG | |
