= Number 2 (KSI song) =

2021 song by KSI featuring Future and 21 Savage

Song by KSI featuring Future and 21 Savage

from the album All Over the Place
- Released: 16 July 2021
- Genre: Hip hop; trap
- Length: 2:53
- Label: RBC; BMG
- Songwriters: Olajide Olatunji; Nayvadius Wilburn; Shéyaa Bin Abraham-Joseph; Diego Avendano; Joel Banks; Taylor Banks; Jamal Rashid; Joseph Chambers; Nana Rogues; Sam Gumbley; Richard Butler Jr.; Ivory Scott; Aaron Ferrucci; Martell Smith Williams
- Producers: Diego Ave; Bankroll Got It; Mally Mall; Chambers; Nana Rogues

Music video
- "Number 2" on YouTube

"Number 2" is a song by British YouTuber and rapper KSI featuring American rapper Future and Atlanta-based rapper 21 Savage from the former's second studio album, All Over the Place (2021). The song was written by the three rappers alongside Rico Love, Ivory Scott, S-X, Aaron Ferrucci, Martell Smith Williams, & producers Diego Ave, Bankroll Got It, Chambers, Mally Mall, and Nana Rogues. It was released for digital download and streaming by RBC Records and BMG on 16 July 2021 upon the release of the album. "Number 2" is a hip hop and trap song. In both the chorus and his verse, KSI relishes in his success and addresses those who have hated on him and doubted him in the past, with an auto-tune-heavy delivery. The song features a beat switch into a more gloomy instrumental in its latter half.

"Number 2" received generally positive reviews from music critics, with many praising its production and the three rappers' "hard" and "commanding" performances. Commercially, the song peaked within the top 10 of the UK Independent Singles Chart and also made two other UK charts and the New Zealand Hot Singles chart, where it charted at number 11. The music video was released on 26 July 2021. The futuristic video alternates between shots of the three rappers playing an online car racing video game in their respective homes and in-game footage of the trio racing through a virtual CGI cityscape, behind the wheels of three matching BMWs. The video's theme acknowledges KSI's roots as a YouTuber and a gamer.

== Background ==
During his guest appearance on the American talk show The Late Late Show with James Corden on 20 April 2021, KSI exclusively revealed that his upcoming second studio album would include a track that features American rappers Future and 21 Savage, titled "Number 2". KSI told James Corden, "It's called 'Number 2'. It's one of my biggest songs on the album. And I have Future and 21 Savage on the song. It's going to be mad. When people hear this tune, they're going to lose their heads. It's going to melt faces." A preview of "Number 2" was released to the video-sharing app TikTok on 9 July 2021.

Speaking to Genius about collaborating with both Future and 21 Savage, KSI said, "I've always wanted to work with 21 Savage and Future. I've listened to all their songs for years. I've been a fan. So to be able to have a song with them and have them want to be on the track, it's just crazy." KSI continued, "I didn't want them to just carry me. I wanted to stand out as well and show that I can hold my own in between these two legends."

== Music and lyrics ==
"Number 2"
A 23-second sample of KSI's auto-tune-heavy chorus, in which he relishes in his success and addresses those who have hated on him and doubted him in the past.

"Number 2" is a hip hop and trap song. The song begins with Future performing the first verse, which is followed by KSI performing both the chorus and the second verse, with an auto-tune-heavy delivery. KSI's verse is immediately preceded by a beat switch into a more gloomy instrumental, which leads into the third verse, performed by 21 Savage. In their verses, Future and 21 Savage flaunt their wealth and lavish lifestyles, with a theme of street level braggadocio. In both the chorus and his verse, KSI relishes in his success and addresses his haters and non-believers.

Speaking to Apple Music about the inspiration for "Number 2", KSI explained, "[This is a] track where I’m gloating. I’m taking on the people [who] doubted me. So many [people] were shitting on me, saying [that] I’d never amount to anything. And now these guys look like clowns in a circus." KSI told Genius that "Number 2" shows his "braggadocios side". He recalled, "There was a lot of people who told me that the whole YouTube thing was pointless [and that] I was wasting my time. So I had to find a way to prove to everyone [that] when this thing pops off [and] when this thing takes over, I'm going to be the one with the [last] laugh. And I definitely am now."

== Critical reception ==
"Number 2" was met with generally positive reviews from music critics. Writing for The Guardian, Kadish Morris called "Number 2" a "fine collaboration". In her review for NME, Kyann-Sian Williams described the instrumental as "nicely gloomy". Williams noted that some of KSI's lyrics are "goofy" and believed that the song is "saved by clean verses from Future and 21 Savage", although she admitted that the pair also "turn in some mediocre bars". Writing for Earmilk, Chloe Robinson described the instrumental as "bold" and "vibrant" and commended its "fresh, sonic flavour" that has a "masterful, magnetic feel". Robinson additionally praised the three rappers for bringing "hard [and] commanding vocal swagger". Courtney Wynter of GRM Daily liked how the three rappers combine "their differing styles". Writing for Complex, Jordan Rose acclaimed that the song "sounds well put together" and praised KSI for putting the featured artists "in positions to play to their strengths". In her review for HotNewHipHop, Erika Marie proclaimed that "Number 2" would be "a standout [track] for hip hop fans".

== Commercial performance ==
In the United Kingdom, "Number 2" placed at number 29 on the midweek update of the UK Singles Chart in its first week of release, but it was excluded from the published chart at the end of the week, in line with the Official Charts Company rule that a main artist is limited to a maximum of three entries per week. The song debuted at number 53 on the UK Streaming Chart and number 15 on the UK Hip Hop and R&B Singles Chart. In New Zealand, the song charted at number 11 on the New Zealand Hot Singles chart.

== Music video ==
The music video for "Number 2" was co-directed by Troy Roscoe and Nayip Ramos. It premiered on KSI's YouTube channel on 26 July 2021 at 19:45 BST. The futuristic video alternates between shots of the three rappers playing an online car racing video game in their respective homes and in-game footage of the trio racing through a virtual CGI cityscape, behind the wheels of three matching BMWs. During the second verse, KSI takes a break from the race to pose for photos with his fans, and during the third verse, 21 Savage races while standing on top of his vehicle. At the end of the video, the three rappers appear to hit an unfinished part of the game and drive off a cliff to their demise. The video closes with a brief message that reads, "Game over". The video's theme acknowledges KSI's roots as both a YouTuber and a gamer.

== Credits and personnel ==
Credits adapted from Tidal.

- KSI – songwriting, vocals
- Future – songwriting, vocals
- 21 Savage – songwriting, vocals
- Diego Ave – production, songwriting
- Bankroll Got It – production, songwriting
- Mally Mall – production, songwriting
- Chambers – production, songwriting
- Nana Rogues – production, songwriting
- S-X – songwriting
- Rico Love – songwriting
- Ivory Scott – songwriting
- Aaron Ferrucci – songwriting
- Martell Smith Williams – songwriting
- Kevin Grainger – engineering
- Joe LaPorta – engineering
- Adam Lunn – engineering
- Rob MacFarlane – engineering
- Niko Marcouza – engineering
- Robert Marks – engineering
- Matt Schwartz – engineering

== Charts ==
Chart performance for "Number 2"
Chart (2021)	Peak position
New Zealand Hot Singles (RMNZ)	11
UK Audio Streaming (OCC)	53
UK Hip Hop/R&B (OCC)	15
UK Indie (OCC)	8

== Release history ==
Release dates and formats for "Number 2"
Region	Date	Format(s)	Version	Label(s)	Ref.
Various	16 July 2021	Digital download; streaming	Original	RBC; BMG	
Various	16 July 2021	Digital download; streaming	Instrumental	RBC; BMG	
