= No Time (KSI song) =

2021 song by KSI featuring Lil Durk

Song by KSI featuring Lil Durk

from the album All Over the Place
- Released: 16 July 2021
- Genre: Hip hop; trap
- Length: 3:00
- Label: RBC; BMG
- Songwriters: Olajide Olatunji; Durk Banks; Sam Gumbley; Diego Avendano; Joseph Chambers; Jamal Rashid
- Producers: S-X; Diego Ave; Chambers; Mally Mall

Music video
- "No Time" on YouTube

"No Time" is a song by British YouTuber and rapper KSI featuring American rapper Lil Durk. It was released on was released by RBC Records and BMG on 16 July 2021 as a track from the former's second studio album, All Over the Place (2021). The hip hop and trap song was written by the two rappers alongside its producers S-X, Diego Ave, Chambers, and Mally Mall.

The song debuted at number 24 on the UK Singles Chart and it additionally entered the music charts of Ireland, New Zealand and Sweden. The animated music video was released on 22 October 2021.

== Commercial performance ==
In the United Kingdom, "No Time" debuted at number 24 on the UK Singles Chart, making it the second highest-placed new entry of that week. The song also debuted at number 7 on the UK Hip Hop and R&B Singles Chart. In the Republic of Ireland, "No Time" debuted at number 30 on the Irish Singles Chart, making it the second highest-placed new entry of that week.

== Music video ==
The music video for "No Time" was directed and animated by KDC Visions, who has previously created music videos for Juice Wrld, Trippie Redd and XXXTentacion. It was released to KSI's YouTube channel on 22 October 2021.

== Credits and personnel ==
Credits adapted from Tidal.

- KSI – songwriting, vocals
- Lil Durk – songwriting, vocals
- S-X – production, songwriting
- Diego Ave – production, songwriting
- Chambers – production, songwriting
- Mally Mall – production, songwriting
- Adam Lunn – engineering
- Joe LaPorta – engineering
- Kevin Grainger – engineering
- Matt Schwartz – engineering
- Niko Marzouca – engineering
- Rob MacFarlane – engineering
- Robert Marks – engineering

== Charts ==
Chart performance for "No Time"
Chart (2021)	Peak position
Ireland (IRMA)	30
New Zealand Hot Singles (RMNZ)	4
Sweden Heatseeker (Sverigetopplistan)	19
UK Singles (Official Charts)	24
UK Hip Hop/R&B (Official Charts)	7
UK Indie (Official Charts)	3

== Release history ==
Release dates and formats for "No Time"
Region	Date	Format(s)	Label(s)	Ref.
Various	16 July 2021	Digital download; streaming	RBC; BMG	
