= Swerve (Jay1 song) =

2021 song by Jay1 featuring KSI

Single by Jay1 featuring KSI

from the album All Over the Place
- Released: 2 July 2021
- Length: 2:25
- Label: RCA; Sony
- Songwriters: Jason Juami; Olajide Olatunji; Raoul Chen; Bryan du Chatenier
- Producers: Diztortion; Trobi

Jay1 singles chronology
"Blazed" (2021)	"Swerve" (2021)	"Ocean" (2021)

KSI singles chronology
"Holiday" (2021)	"Swerve" (2021)	"Lose" (2021)

Music video
- "Swerve" on YouTube

"Swerve" (stylised in all caps) is a song by British rapper Jay1. The song features a guest appearance from British YouTuber and rapper KSI. It was released for digital download and streaming by RCA Records and Sony on 2 July 2021. An accompanying music video was released the day before the song's release. The song charted at number 69 in the United Kingdom. The song appears on the Platinum VIP edition of KSI's second studio album, All Over the Place (2021).

== Writing and production ==
Speaking about the song, Jay1 said, “This [song]'s a summer banger... KSI killed it and it’s so good to be putting out music with him." KSI said, “It’s a big song, so you know [that I] had to go in with a new flow and kill it. I already know [that] this [song] is gonna pop on TikTok... I’m sure people are gonna love it.”

== Critical reception ==
Elle Evans of Mixtape Madness wrote, "Housing his signature flow and feel-good energy, Jay1 welcomes the track with an infectious hook and [an] unapologetic verse before KSI later joins with his slick pen game." Courtney Wynter of GRM Daily noted that "Swerve" has "an infectious beat" that "[prompts Jay1 and KSI] to inject the production with their playful lyrics". The staff of Notion acclaimed that "this [song] was always going to be a catchy one with KSI and Jay1 on the bill" and "the pair bounce off each other in this playful, fast-paced number".

== Music video ==
The music video for "Swerve" premiered on the GRM Daily YouTube channel on 2 July 2021 at 20:00 BST. The video was directed by LX. Courtney Wynter of GRM Daily found that "the fun vibe of the song is perfectly captured" in the video.

== Credits and personnel ==
Credits adapted from Tidal.

- Jay1 – songwriting, vocals
- KSI – songwriting, vocals
- Diztortion – production, songwriting
- Trobi – production, songwriting
- Dukus – mixing, mastering
- Sam Harper – engineering

== Charts ==
Chart performance for "Swerve"
Chart (2021)	Peak position
Ireland (IRMA)	95
New Zealand Hot Singles (RMNZ)	36
UK Singles (OCC)	69
UK Hip Hop/R&B (OCC)	22

== Release history ==
Release dates and formats for "Swerve"
Region	Date	Format(s)	Label(s)	Ref.
Various	1 July 2021	Digital download; streaming	RCA; Sony	
