= Summer Is Over (KSI song) =

2022 song by KSI

Single by KSI
- Released: 30 September 2022
- Length: 3:08
- Label: Atlantic; Warner
- Songwriters: Olajide Olatunji; Nicholas Gale; Dan Priddy; Andrew Bullimore; James Bell; Mams Taylor
- Producers: Digital Farm Animals; Dan Priddy

KSI singles chronology
"Not Over Yet" (2022)	"Summer Is Over" (2022)	"Voices" (2023)

"Summer Is Over" is a song by British YouTuber and rapper KSI. The song was written alongside Andrew "BullySongs" Bullimore, Dan Priddy, James Bell, Mams Taylor and produced by Dan Priddy & Digital Farm Animals. "Summer Is Over" was released for digital download and streaming by Warner Music Group, Beerus Limited, and Atlantic Records on 30 September 2022. A remix of the song was released 3 October 2022 by British producer Joel Corry.

"Summer Is Over" debuted at number 24 on the UK Singles Chart, becoming KSI's seventeenth top 40 hit.

== Music and lyrics ==
Speaking about "Summer Is Over" ahead of its release, KSI said, "This song is so personal to me. I can't lie, I've cried several times making and listening to it. I made this song at a really painful time in my life where mentally and physically I was struggling a lot. As someone in the public, I tend to have to hide my sad moments, so I normally use music therapeutically to help me get through those times. So yeah, this song means a lot to me, and has taken a lot for me to finally put out."

== Music video ==
The music video was directed by Troy Roscoe and was released to KSI's second YouTube channel on 3 October 2022.

== Track listing ==
Digital download
No.	Title	Length
1.	"Summer Is Over"	3:08

Digital download – remix
No.	Title	Length
1.	"Summer Is Over" (Joel Corry Remix)	2:49
2.	"Summer Is Over"	3:08

== Credits and personnel ==
Credits adapted from Tidal.

- Digital Farm Animals – producer, composer, keyboards
- Dan Priddy – producer, composer, programmer, backing vocals, bass, drums, guitar, keyboards
- KSI – vocals, composer
- Mams Taylor - composer
- Lewis Hopkins - masterer
- Manny Marroquin - mixer

== Charts ==
Weekly chart performance for "Summer Is Over"
Chart (2022)	Peak position
Ireland (IRMA)	35
New Zealand Hot Singles (RMNZ)	7
UK Singles (OCC)	24

== Release history ==
Release dates and formats for "Summer Is Over"
Region	Date	Format(s)	Version	Label(s)	Ref.
Various	30 September 2022	Digital download; streaming	Original	Atlantic Records; Warner Music Group	
Various	3 October 2022	Digital download; streaming	Remix	Atlantic Records; Warner Music Group	
