= Don Corleon =

Jamaican record producer (born 1978)

- Donovan Bennett
- Born: September 24, 1978 (age 48); Jamaica
- Style: Reggae, Dancehall, Pop, R&B, Reggaeton

Don Corleon (born Donovan Bennett; in 1978) is a Jamaican record producer, songwriter, and mixer. He has worked with artists including Migos, Sean Paul, Sizzla, Keyshia Cole, Rihanna, Bounty Killa, Vybz Kartel, Shaggy, Romeo Santos, Nicki Minaj, Pressure, Tommy Lee Sparta, Gentleman, Protoje and Pitbull.

Don Corleon produced many successful Riddims like "Drop Leaf" (including T.O.K.'s "Footprints"), "Seasons" (including Sean Paul's "Never Gonna Be The Same"), "Istanbul", "High Altitude" (the riddim to Rihanna's 2006 single Break It Off feat. Sean Paul) and many more.
