= Patience (KSI song) =

2021 song by KSI featuring Yungblud and Polo G

Single by KSI featuring Yungblud and Polo G

from the album All Over the Place
- Released: 12 March 2021
- Genre: Synth-pop
- Length: 3:01
- Label: RBC
- Songwriters: Olajide Olatunji; Dominic Harrison; Taurus Bartlett; Matt Schwartz; Nicholas Gale; Richard Parkhouse; George Tizzard; James Bell; Sam Gumbley; Diego Avendano; Yoshiya Ady; Peter Jideonwo
- Producer: Matt Schwartz

KSI singles chronology
"Don't Play" (2021)	"Patience" (2021)	"Holiday" (2021)

Yungblud singles chronology
"Acting Like That" (2020)	"Patience" (2021)	"Fleabag" (2021)

Polo G singles chronology
"GNF (OKOKOK)" (2021)	"Patience" (2021)	"Headshot" (2021)

Music video
- "Patience" on YouTube

"Patience" is a song by British YouTuber and musician KSI featuring fellow British musician Yungblud and American rapper Polo G. It was released for digital download and streaming by RBC Records and BMG on 12 March 2021 as the third single from the former's second studio album, All Over the Place. The artists wrote the song alongside Digital Farm Animals, Red Triangle, YAMI, S-X, Diego Ave, Yoshi, Peter Jideonwo, and producer Matt Schwartz.

The song received positive reviews from music critics. It debuted at number three on the UK Singles Chart and it has been certified gold by the British Phonographic Industry (BPI) for exceeding sales of 400,000 units in the UK. The song entered the singles charts of Australia, Belgium, Canada, Croatia, Denmark, Hungary, Ireland, Lithuania, the Netherlands, New Zealand, Norway, Slovakia and Sweden. The music video was released on 15 March 2021. An acoustic version was released one week after the release of the song, excluding Polo G.

== Writing and production ==
Speaking to MTV, Yungblud said, "We wanted to do something that is unexpected and bizarre and wacky. We were just mates in a studio making music and it sounded good, so we put it out."

== Release and promotion ==
"Patience" was released for digital download and streaming by RBC Records and BMG on 12 March 2021 as the third single from KSI's second studio album. The song's cover art depicts the three artists as cartoon characters, standing around an hourglass in the centre of a purple background. An audio video was released to KSI's YouTube channel on the same day as the song's release. A lyric video was released to Yungblud's YouTube channel one day later.

An acoustic version of "Patience" was released alongside an audio video on 19 March 2021.

== Music video ==
The music video for "Patience" was co-directed by Troy Roscoe and Nayip Ramos. It premiered on KSI's YouTube channel on 15 March 2021. A behind-the-scenes video of the music video shoot was released by MTV two days before. KSI uploaded a reaction video in which he and Yungblud watch the music video to YouTube on 29 March 2021.

== Commercial performance ==
In the United Kingdom, "Patience" was the most downloaded song of that week. It debuted at number three on the UK Singles Chart, making it the highest-placed new entry of that week. It stood as KSI's sixth UK top 10 single and first for Yungblud and Polo G. On 12 December 2025, "Patience" was certified gold by the British Phonographic Industry (BPI) for exceeding sales of 400,000 track-equivalent units in the UK. On 9 August 2022, Music Week reported that "Patience" has sold 331,573 units in the UK.

In Ireland, "Patience" debuted at number eight on the Irish Singles Chart, making it the highest-placed new entry of that week. Elsewhere in Europe, the song charted at number 37 in Denmark, number 15 in Hungary, number 85 in Lithuania and number 37 in Norway. In Australia, "Patience" debuted at number 61 on the ARIA Singles Chart. In Canada, "Patience" debuted at number 94 on the Canadian Hot 100. In the United States, "Patience" peaked at number five on the Digital Songs Sales charts and earned KSI a spot on Billboard's Emerging Artists chart. "Patience" charted at number 102 on the Billboard Global 200 chart.

== Credits and personnel ==
Credits adapted from Tidal.

- KSI – songwriting, vocals
- Yungblud – songwriting, vocals
- Polo G – songwriting, vocals
- Matt Schwartz – production, songwriting
- Digital Farm Animals – songwriting
- Red Triangle – songwriting
- YAMI – songwriting
- S-X – songwriting
- Diego Ave – songwriting
- Yoshi – songwriting
- Peter Jideonwo – songwriting
- John Hanes – engineering
- Serban Ghenea – engineering
- Joe LaPorta – engineering
- Chris Greatti – production, engineering (acoustic version only)

== Charts ==
Chart performance for "Patience"
Chart (2021)	Peak position
Australia (ARIA)	61
Belgium (Ultratop Flanders R&B/Hip-Hop)	47
Belgium (Ultratop Wallonia Airplay)	50
Canada Hot 100 (Billboard)	94
Croatia (HRT)	36
Denmark (Tracklisten)	37
Euro Digital Song Sales (Billboard)	2
Global 200 (Billboard)	102
Hungary (Single Top 40)	15
Ireland (IRMA)	8
Lithuania (AGATA)	85
Mexico Ingles Airplay (Billboard)	19
Netherlands (Single Tip)	8
New Zealand Hot Singles (RMNZ)	4
Norway (VG-lista)	37
Slovakia Airplay (ČNS IFPI)	75
Sweden Heatseeker (Sverigetopplistan)	5
UK Singles (OCC)	3
US Bubbling Under Hot 100 (Billboard)	5

== Certifications ==
Certifications for "Patience"
Region	Certification	Certified units/sales
United Kingdom (BPI)	Gold	400,000^{‡}
^{‡} Sales+streaming figures based on certification alone.

== Release history ==
Release dates and formats for "Patience"
Region	Date	Format(s)	Version	Label(s)	Ref.
Various	5 March 2021	Digital download; streaming	Acoustic	RBC; BMG	
Various	11 March 2021	Digital download; streaming	Instrumental	RBC; BMG	
Various	12 March 2021	Digital download; streaming	Original	RBC; BMG	

== See also ==
- List of UK top-ten singles in 2021
- List of UK Singles Downloads Chart number ones of the 2020s
- List of top 10 singles in 2021 (Ireland)
