= Lose (song) =

2021 single by KSI and Lil Wayne

Single by KSI and Lil Wayne

from the album All Over the Place (Deluxe)
- Released: 6 August 2021
- Genre: Rap rock; pop-punk
- Length: 3:25
- Label: RBC; BMG
- Songwriters: Olajide Olatunji; Dwayne Carter, Jr.; Nicholas Gale; Sam Gumbley; Benjamin Samama; Charlie Snyder; Peter Jideonwo; Ivory Scott
- Producer: Digital Farm Animals

KSI singles chronology
"Swerve" (2021)	"Lose" (2021)	"Locked Out" (2022)

Lil Wayne singles chronology
"Hall of Flying Mirrors in the Palace of Versailles" (2021)	"Lose" (2021)	"Lonely" (2021)

Music video
- "Lose" on YouTube

"Lose" is a song by British YouTube personality and rapper KSI and American rapper Lil Wayne as the only single from the deluxe edition (sixth overall) of the former's second studio album, All Over the Place (2021). The song was written alongside and Ivory Scott, S-X, David Snyder, Peter Jideonwo, Jochanan Samam, and producer Digital Farm Animals. It was released for digital download and streaming by RBC Records and BMG on 6 August 2021 as the fifth single from the album. "Lose" is a hip hop track with elements of rock.

"Lose" received positive reviews from music critics. The song debuted at number 18 on the UK Singles Chart and number 86 on the Billboard Hot 100. It additionally entered the music charts of Australia, Canada, Hungary, Ireland, the Netherlands, New Zealand, Norway and Sweden. The music video was released on the same day as the single. The video places the two rappers in a therapist's office, where they talk about their problems with women, before being launched into wild, animated explorations of their psyches.

== Background and composition ==
The song serves as the first collaboration between KSI and Lil Wayne. Speaking of the song and collaboration, KSI said, "If you told me 10 years ago that this was gonna happen, I would have laughed in your face and blocked you from my contacts. But here we are, it's a reality. Me and Lil Wayne have come together on a track no one will expect. From the singing chorus to the amazing verses, this is a song that will live on for decades".

== Release and promotion ==
In May 2021, KSI announced that he has a collaboration with a big artist whose name ends with the letter "E", which led fans to speculate it to either be Lil Wayne or Canadian rapper Drake. However, in July 2021, model Ravyn Rochelle, who participates in the music video for the song, confirmed that Wayne would be the co-lead artist. KSI eventually revealed the co-lead artist and the song on 30 July 2021. On 4 August 2021, he stated that there would be a music video to accompany the song.

The single charted at number 18 in the UK Singles Chart. It became KSI's first ever single to chart in the US, debuting at number 86 on the Billboard Hot 100.

== Critical reception ==
Joshua Robinson from HotNewHipHop referred to the music that Lil Wayne created on his seventh studio album, Rebirth (2010), and felt that fans "will be delighted to hear the legendary rapper return to his pop-runk aesthetic, and all-in-all, his chemistry with KSI makes for a solid record". Pop-runk refers to pop, rap, and punk combined. Akaash of HipHopNMore said that "it has a rock element to it, adding a new genre to the mix, which is why the album title is what it is", referring to KSI's second studio album, All Over the Place.

== Music video ==
A music video premiered to KSI's YouTube channel nine hours after the song on 6 August 2021. Himself and Lil Wayne are in a therapist's office, talking about their problems with women "before being launched into wild, animated explorations of their psyches".

== Charts ==
Chart performance for "Lose"
Chart (2021)	Peak position
Australia (ARIA)	38
Australia Hip Hop/R&B (ARIA)	14
Canada Hot 100 (Billboard)	61
Euro Digital Song Sales (Billboard)	8
Global 200 (Billboard)	74
Hungary (Single Top 40)	18
Ireland (IRMA)	20
Netherlands (Single Tip)	10
New Zealand (Recorded Music NZ)	35
Norway (VG-lista)	25
Sweden (Sverigetopplistan)	100
UK Singles (OCC)	18
UK Indie (OCC)	2
UK Hip Hop/R&B (OCC)	4
US Billboard Hot 100	86
US Hot R&B/Hip-Hop Songs (Billboard)	31
US Rhythmic Airplay (Billboard)	33
