= Easy (KSI, Bugzy Malone and R3hab song) =

2023 single by KSI, Bugzy Malone and R3hab

Single by KSI, Bugzy Malone and R3hab
- Released: 13 May 2023
- Length: 2:41
- Label: Atlantic; Warner
- Songwriters: Olajide Olatunji; Aaron Daniel Davies; Fadil El Ghoul; Alexander Shuckburgh; Diego Avendano; Richard Preston Butler Jr.
- Producers: R3hab; Diego Ave; Al Shux

KSI singles chronology
"Voices" (2023)	"Easy" (2023)	"Thick of It" (2024)

Bugzy Malone singles chronology
"All Of Me" (2023)	"Easy" (2023)

R3hab singles chronology
"Golden Hour" (2023)	"Easy" (2023)

"Easy" is a song by English YouTuber KSI, British rapper Bugzy Malone and Dutch DJ and record producer R3hab. It was released for digital download and streaming by Atlantic Records and Warner Music Group on 13 May 2023.

== Release and promotion ==
The single was first previewed on 14 January 2023 as KSI's ring walk against fellow YouTuber FaZe Temperrr. On 13 May, "Easy" was released on released for digital download and streaming by Atlantic Records and Warner Music Group ahead of KSI's bout with Joe Fournier, which KSI used for his ring walk.

== Credits and personnel ==
Credits adapted from Tidal.

- KSI – songwriting, vocals
- Bugzy Malone – songwriting, vocals
- R3hab – songwriting, production, engineering, mixing, mastering
- Al Shux – songwriting, production
- Diego Ave – songwriting, production
- Rico Love – songwriting

== Charts ==
Chart performance for "Easy"
Chart (2023)	Peak position
New Zealand Hot Singles (RMNZ)	38
