= Voices (KSI song) =

2023 song by KSI

Single by KSI featuring Oliver Tree
- Released: 27 January 2023
- Length: 3:08
- Label: Atlantic; Warner
- Songwriters: Olajide Olatunji; Oliver Tree; Nicholas Gale; James Murray; Mustafa Omer; Conor Blake Manning; Sara Boe; Stuart Hawkes; Trey Station; Anthony Vilchils; Zach Pereyra; Manny Marroquin; Marc Fineman; Will Vaughan
- Producers: Digital Farm Animals; Mojam

KSI singles chronology
"Summer Is Over" (2022)	"Voices" (2023)	"Easy" (2023)

Oliver Tree singles chronology
"Miss You" (2022)	"Voices" (2023)	"Here We Go Again" (2023)

Music video
- "Voices" on YouTube

"Voices" is a song by British YouTuber and rapper KSI featuring American singer Oliver Tree. The song was written by the two artists alongside Conor Blake Manning, Sara Boe and producers Digital Farm Animals and Mojam. "Voices" was released for digital download and streaming by Warner Music Group, Beerus Limited, and Atlantic Records on 27 January 2023.

"Voices" debuted at number 11 on the UK Singles Chart, becoming KSI's eighteenth top 40 hit.

== Music and lyrics ==
Speaking about "Voices", KSI said, "'Voices’ is a song I worked on during my weird phase mentally. This is a big song for me because it marked a big chapter in my life. After my breakup, I thought I was fine, but I had these voices in my head telling me I wasn't as happy as I thought I was.."

Oliver Tree said, "The song is about the pain we experience in the aftermath of a breakup. Lying to ourselves as we try to replace the void with a fling or waking up in your cold empty bed alone. That person can haunt our head for months, even years after. Wondering if we will ever escape the memories of the person, we once loved who's now a stranger."

== Music video ==
The music video was directed by Oliver Tree and was released to KSI's YouTube channel on 27 January 2023 and has gained over 9 million views as of April 2026.

== Credits and personnel ==
- Digital Farm Animals – producer, composer, programmer
- Mojam – producer, composer, programmer
- KSI – vocals, composer
- Oliver Tree – vocals
- Conor Blake Manning – composer
- Sara Boe – composer, whistle
- Stuart Hawkes – mastering
- Trey Station – mixing
- Anthony Vilchils – mixing
- Zach Pereyra – mixing
- Manny Marroquin – mixing
- Marc Fineman – bass, drums, guitar, keyboards, percussion, synthesizer
- Will Vaughan – guitar

== Charts ==
Chart performance for "Voices"
Chart (2023)	Peak position
Ireland (IRMA)	27
New Zealand Hot Singles (RMNZ)	5
Slovakia Airplay (ČNS IFPI)	48
UK Singles (OCC)	11

== Release history ==
Release dates and formats for "Summer Is Over"
Region	Date	Format(s)	Label(s)	Ref.
Various	27 January 2023	Digital download; streaming	Atlantic Records; Warner Music Group	
