= Jay1 =

English rapper

- Born: Jason Andrè Juami; 27 January 1998 (age 28); Southgate, London, England
- Origin: Coventry, West Midlands, England
- Genre: Hip hop
- Occupations: Rapper; songwriter
- Years active: 2015–present
- Labels: GRM, RCA

Jason Andrè Juami (born 27 January 1998), better known by his stage name Jay1 (stylised as JAY1), is a British rapper and songwriter who is from Coventry. He is of Congolese ancestry. He has had two top 20 singles in the UK.

Jay1 is best known for his single "Your Mrs", which was released in March 2019. He released his debut EP titled One Wave on 4 July 2019.

== Early life ==
Before his keen interest in music, Jay1 undertook a PESS apprenticeship with local Coventry apprenticeship provider SCCU.

He started taking music seriously in 2016, when he moved to Coventry from Southgate, North London.

== Discography ==
=== Extended plays ===
List of extended plays, with selected details
Title	Details	Peak chart positions		Certifications
Title	Details	UK	UK HH/R&B	Certifications
One Wave	Released: 4 July 2019; Label: GRM; Formats: CD, digital download	28	7	BPI: Silver
One Wave 2	Released: 9 April 2021; Label: GRM; Formats: CD, digital download	—	—	
"—" denotes a recording that did not chart or was not released in that territory.

=== Mixtapes ===
Title	Details
Sorry I'm Late	Released: 22 August 2024; Label: One Wave; Formats: CD, digital download
Final Wave	Released: 16 October 2026; Label: Run Things; Formats: CD, digital download

=== Singles ===
==== As Lead Artist ====
Title	Year	Peak chart positions		Certifications	Album
Title	Year	UK	UK HH/R&B	Certifications	Album
"Like C4"	2017	—	—		Non-album singles
"That's My Bae"	2018	—	—		Non-album singles
"Sweet One"	2018	—	—		Non-album singles
"Good Vibes"	2018	—	—	BPI: Silver	One Wave
"Becky"	2018	—	—	BPI: Silver	One Wave
"Your Mrs"	2019	18	7	BPI: Platinum	One Wave
"Mocking It"	2019	19	8	BPI: Gold	One Wave
"4AM in Coventry"	2019	44	29		Non-album single
"2 on 2" (with Tion Wayne)	2019	53	40	BPI: Silver	T Wayne's World 3
"Million Bucks"	2019	60	31		Non-album singles
"Flex" (featuring JB Scofield)	2020	60	—		Non-album singles
"Tee" (featuring Loski)	2020	65	—		Non-album singles
"Curvy" (with The Plug & Blueface)	2020	—	—		Non-album singles
"Gwop"	2020	—	—		One Wave 2
"Casanova" (with Dj Jay-K and Guè)	2021	—	—		Non-album singles
"Kisan" (with Coolie, Jaz Dhami, Temz, Tana, J Fado and Hargo)	2021	—	—		Non-album singles
"Patiently"	2021	—	—		One Wave 2
"Blazed"	2021	—	—		Non-album single
"Swerve" (featuring KSI)	2021	69	22		All Over The Place
"Ocean"	2021	—	—		Non-album single
"DND"	2021	—	—		Non-album single
"Mercedes"	2022	—	—		Non-album single
"WTF"	2022	—	—		Non-album single
"Came In Sauce"	2022	—	—		Non-album single
"Loose" (with Outcast Music)	2022	—	—		Non-album single
"Bella"	2023	—	—		Non-album single
"Perth"	2023	—	—		Non-album single
"Sunshine" (with Hutch)	2023	—	—		Non-album single
"Sunday Service"	2024	—	—		Non-album single
"Lay It Down" (with TRY, DreamDoll, Sam i and Shmuck the Loyal)	2024	—	—		Non-album single
"Respectfully"	2024	—	—		Sorry I'm Late
"ASAP" (with Neeshay)	2024	—	—		Sorry I'm Late
"Famous"	2024	—	—		Sorry I'm Late
"—" denotes a recording that did not chart or was not released in that territory.

==== As Featured Artist ====
Title	Year	Peak chart positions	Album
Title	Year	UK	Album
"Hide And Seek (Remix)" (Tayo Sound and Future Utopia featuring Jay1)	2022	—	Non-album single

=== Other charted songs ===
Title	Year	Peak chart positions			Album
Title	Year	UK	UK HH/R&B	UK Ind.	Album
"Gang Gang" (KSI featuring Jay1 and Deno)	2021	40	14	6	All Over the Place

=== Guest appearances ===
List of non-single guest appearances, with other performing artists, showing year released and album name
Title	Year	Other artist(s)	Album
"Keisha & Becky (Remix)"	2019	Russ Millions, Tion Wayne, Aitch, Swarmz and Sav'o	T Wayne's World 3
"Lauren"	2019	Deno	Eye 2 Eye
"Dumpling" (Toddla T Remix)	2020	Stylo G, Sean Paul and Toddla T	Non-album remix
"Gang Gang"	2021	KSI, Deno	All Over the Place
"Mbappé (Remix)"	2022	Day1, Gambino La MG, KAHUKX	Non-album remix
