= Digital Farm Animals =

English DJ and record producer

Background information
- Born: Nicholas James Gale; London, England
- Genres: Electronic, house, dance
- Occupations: DJ; record producer
- Years active: 2013–present

Nicholas James Gale, (Note: Most sources state his name as Nick Gale or Nicholas Gale) known professionally as Digital Farm Animals, is an English DJ and record producer. He has featured on and co-written numerous tracks that have reached the top 10 of the UK Singles Chart, including "Don't Play", "Really Love", "Back to You" and "Be the One".

== Career ==
Gale has worked as a writer and producer with artists including Noah Cyrus, Dua Lipa, Danny Ocean, Becky G, Alan Walker, Hailee Steinfeld, Jason Derulo, Galantis, will.i.am, Little Mix, Rvssian, Louisa Johnson, Nelly, Marlon Roudette, Anne-Marie, INNA, Kain Rivers, Louis Tomlinson, KSI, Annika Rose, Craig David, Sigma, Nathan Evans, Cash Cash, Oliver Tree and others.

As a DJ, he has performed at festivals and venues around the world, including Tomorrowland, Mysteryland, V Fest, Boardmasters and Ministry of Sound Club. In 2015, Digital Farm Animals signed a record deal with record label Syco Entertainment and in 2019 he signed with Arista Records. Digital Farm Animals is currently signed to Spirit Music Group. He has worked closely with KSI on his 2021 album 'All Over the Place', co-writing and producing 5 tracks on the album.

== Discography ==
=== EPs ===
Title	Details
Digital Farm Animals 1	Released: 12 June 2024; Label: Mutineer Music Group; Format: Digital download, streaming

=== Singles ===
==== As lead artist ====
Title	Year	Peak chart positions						Album
Title	Year	UK	BEL (WA)	CAN	NL	SWE	US Dance	Album
"True"	2015	—	—	—	—	—	—	Non-album singles
"Didn't Know" (with Yasmin)	2015	—	—	—	—	—	—	Non-album singles
"Wanna Know" (with Youthonix featuring R. Kelly)	2016	—	—	—	—	—	—	Non-album singles
"Millionaire" (with Cash Cash featuring Nelly)	2016	25	— (Note: "Millionaire" did not enter the official Wallonie Ultratop chart, but, rather, peaked at number 33 on the Ultratip chart, an extension to the main chart.)	—	46	98	22	Blood, Sweat & 3 Years
"Only One" (with Sigala)	2016	53	—	—	—	96	—	Non-album singles
"Digital Love" (featuring Hailee Steinfeld)	2017	—	—	—	—	—		Non-album singles
"Say My Name" (featuring Iman)	2018	—	—	—	—	—	—	Non-album singles
"Tokyo Nights" (with Shaun Frank and Dragonette)	2018	—	—	97	—	—	—	Non-album singles
"Lookin' For" (with Danny Ocean)	2019	—	—	—	—	—	45	Non-album singles
"Next to You" (with Becky G featuring Rvssian)	2019	—	—	—	—	—	34	Non-album singles
"Without You Now" (with AJ Mitchell)	2019	—	—	—	—	—	—	Non-album singles
"Drowning" (with Franklin and Sorana)	2019	—	—	—	—	—	—	Non-album singles
"Summertime Love" (with Captain Cuts)	2019	—	—	—	—	— (Note: "Summertime Love" did not enter the Swedish Singellista Chart, but peaked at number 19 on the Swedish Heatseeker Chart.)	—	Non-album singles
"Paranoia" (featuring Alec King)	2019	—	—	—	—	—	—	Non-album singles
"Gold"	2019	—	—	—	—	—	—	Non-album singles
"Ballin'" (with Gaullin featuring Tim North)	2020	—	—	—	—	—	—	Non-album singles
"Undo My Heart" (with Karen Harding)	2020	—	—	—	—	—	—	Sweet Vibrations
"Don't Play" (with Anne-Marie and KSI)	2021	2	—	—	—	—	—	Therapy and All Over the Place
"Last Night" (featuring Harlee)	2021	—	—	—	—	—	—	Non-album singles
"Human"	2022	—	—	—	—	—	—	Non-album singles
"Streets Of Gold" (with Kelli-Leigh)	2022	—	—	—	—	—	—	Non-album singles
"X&Y" (with Caity Baser)	2022	—	—	—	—	—	—	Non-album singles
"ILYAF (I Love You Always Forever)" (with Donna Lewis)	2023	—	—	—	—	—	—	Non-album singles
"B.O.O.T.Y" (with Franklin)	2023	—	—	—	—	—	—	Non-album singles
"Fake Friends" (with Slowboy and Alma)	2024	—	—	—	—	—	—	Non-album singles
"Ur Touch"	2024	—	—	—	—	—	—	Digital Farm Animals 1
"Take Me In Your Arms (Rock Your Baby)"	2024	—	—	—	—	—	—	Digital Farm Animals 1
"High All The Time"	2024	—	—	—	—	—	—	Digital Farm Animals 1
"Back For Your Love"	2024	—	—	—	—	—	—	Digital Farm Animals 1
"Same Cycle" (with Hedex and ArrDee)	2025	—	—	—	—	—	—	Non-album singles
"The Weekend" (with Kenny Can't Dance)	2026	—	—	—	—	—	—	Non-album singles
"No Loyalty" (with Harry T and Carla Frigo)	2026	—	—	—	—	—	—	Non-album singles
"—" denotes a single that did not chart or was not released in that territory.

==== As featured artist ====
Title	Year	Peak chart positions					Certifications	Album
Title	Year	UK	AUS	BEL (FL)	US	US Dance	Certifications	Album
"Rio" (Netsky featuring Digital Farm Animals)	2015	158	—	4	—	—		3
"Work It Out" (Netsky featuring Digital Farm Animals)	2016	188	—	5	—	—		3
"Back to You" (Louis Tomlinson featuring Bebe Rexha and Digital Farm Animals)	2017	8	11	30	40	—	BPI: Gold; ARIA: 2× Platinum; FIMI: Gold; GLF: Gold; MC: Gold; RIAA: Platinum; RMNZ: Gold	Non-album singles
"Arms Around Me" (Hook n Sling featuring Digital Farm Animals)	2017	—	—	—	—	—		Non-album singles
"Touch The Sky" (Cedric Gervais featuring Digital Farm Animals and Dallas Austin)	2017	—	—	—	—	—		Non-album singles
"All Falls Down" (Alan Walker featuring Noah Cyrus and Digital Farm Animals)	2017	87	95	47	—	11	ARIA: Gold; MC: Platinum	Different World
"Really Love" (KSI featuring Craig David and Digital Farm Animals)	2020	3	—	—	—	17	BPI: Platinum	All Over the Place
"Home Sweet Home" (Sam Feldt featuring Alma and Digital Farm Animals)	2020	—	—	—	—	—		Home Sweet Home
"—" denotes a single that did not chart or was not released in that territory.

== Songwriting and production credits ==
Year	Artist	Song	Album	Ref.
2015	Netsky	"Rio" feat. Digital Farm Animals	III	
2015	Rudimental	"All That Love" feat. Anne-Marie	We the Generation	
2015	Dua Lipa	"Be the One"	Dua Lipa	
2016	Netsky	"Work It Out" feat. Digital Farm Animals	III	
2016	Alex Newell	"Devilish"	Power EP	
2016	Galantis	"No Money"	The Aviary	
2016	Annalisa	"Potrei abituarmi (Used to You)"	Se avessi un cuore	
2016	Netsky	"Leave It Alone" feat. Saint Raymond	III	
2016	Netsky	"Go 2"	III	
2016	Jones	"Wild"	New Skin	
2017	Cedric Gervais	"Touch the Sky" feat. Dallas Austin and Digital Farm Animals	Non-album single	
2017	Noah Cyrus	"Stay Together"	Non-album single	
2017	Jonas Blue	"In Your Arms Tonight" with Mark Villa	Jonas Blue: Electronic Nature	
2017	Louis Tomlinson	"Back to You" feat. Bebe Rexha and Digital Farm Animals	Non-album single	
2017	Felix Jaehn	"Feel Good" with Mike Williams	I	
2017	Hook n Sling	"Arms Around Me" feat. Digital Farm Animals	Non-album single	
2017	The Vamps	"Personal" feat. Maggie Lindemann	Night & Day	
2017	Rita Ora	"Anywhere"	Phoenix	
2017	Alan Walker	"All Falls Down" feat. Noah Cyrus and Digital Farm Animals	Different World	
2018	Matoma	"Lonely" feat. Max	One in a Million	
2018	John Gibbons	"Sweat (A La La La La Long)"	Non-album single	
2018	Gnash	"Imagine If"	We	
2018	Cheat Codes	"Only You" with Little Mix	LM5	
2018	James Arthur	"Empty Space"	You	
2018	Syn Cole	"Getaway"	Non-album single	
2018	Olly Murs	"Feel the Same"	You Know I Know	
2018	Rita Ora	"Falling to Pieces"	Phoenix	
2018	AJ Mitchell	"No Plans" feat. Marteen	Non-album single	
2019	Kain Rivers	"Faded"	Believe	
2019	Jason Derulo	"Mamacita" feat. Farruko	Non-album single	
2019	Friendly Fires	"Kiss and Rewind"	Inflorescent	
2019	Aitch	"Buss Down" feat. ZieZie	Aitch2O	
2019	Sigala	"We Got Love" feat. Ella Henderson	Everything I Didn't Say	
2020	Love Fame Tragedy	"Riding a Wave"	Wherever I Go, I Want to Leave	
2020	Alma	"Stay All Night"	Have U Seen Her?	
2020	Mimi Webb	"Before I Go"	Non-album single	
2020	Alma	"LA Money"	Have U Seen Her?	
2020	Alma	"Loser"	Have U Seen Her?	
2020	Ellie Goulding	"Power"	Brightest Blue	
2020	Wonho	"Losing You"	Love Synonym, Pt. 1	
2020	Lukas Graham	"Share That Love" feat. G-Eazy	4 (The Pink Album)	
2020	Jamie	"Numbers" feat. Changmo	Non-album single	
2020	Nicky Romero	"Nights with You"	Non-album single	
2020	KSI	"Really Love" feat. Craig David and Digital Farm Animals	All Over the Place	
2020	Sam Feldt	"Home Sweet Home" feat. Alma and Digital Farm Animals	Home Sweet Home EP	
2021	KSI	"Patience" feat. Yungblud and Polo G	All Over the Place	
2021	Marshmello	"Leave Before You Love Me" with Jonas Brothers	Non-album single	
2021	Dynoro	"Monsters" feat. 24kGoldn	Non-album single	
2021	KSI	"You"	All Over the Place	
2021	KSI	"Holiday"	All Over the Place	
2021	KSI	"Know You" feat. S-X and A1 x J1	All Over the Place	
2021	KSI	"Lose" with Lil Wayne	All Over the Place	
2021	Steve Aoki	"End of the World" with End of the World	Non-album single	
2021	Craig David	"Who You Are" with MNEK	22	
2021	Mimi Webb	"Heavenly"	Seven Shades of Heartbreak	
2021	Westlife	"Rewind"	Wild Dreams	
2022	S-X	"All Night" feat. Trippie Redd	Non-album single	
2022	Charli XCX	"Beg for You" feat. Rina Sawayama	Crash	
2022	Jennifer Lopez	"Love Of My Life"	Marry Me	
2022	Clean Bandit	"Everything But You" feat. A7S	Non-album single	
2022	Craig David	"My Heart's Been Waiting for You" feat. Duvall	22	
2022	S-X	"Locked Out" feat. KSI	Non-album single	
2022	Neiked	"I Just Called" with Anne-Marie and Latto	Non-album single	
2022	Craig David	"G Love" feat. Nippa	22	
2022	Marshmello	"Numb" with Khalid	Non-album single	
2022	Claudia Valentina	"Sweat"	Non-album single	
2022	Craig David	"DNA" with Galantis	22	
2022	KSI	"Not Over Yet" feat. Tom Grennan	What Ifs & Maybes	
2022	Caity Baser	"X&Y"	Non-album single	
2022	KSI	"Summer Is Over"	Non-album single	
2022	Joel Corry	"Lionheart (Fearless)" with Tom Grennan	Another Friday Night	
2023	KSI	"Voices" feat. Oliver Tree	Non-album single	
2023	Sueco	"POS"	Non-album single	
2023	Audien	"Antidote" with Codeko	Non-album single	
2023	Oliver Tree	"Here We Go Again" with David Guetta	Non-album single	
2023	Mimi Webb	"Amelia"	Amelia	
2023	Nico Santos	"Number 1"	Ride	
2023	Briskin	"In The Middle"	The Circus	
2023	Charlotte Cardin	"99 Nights"	99 Nights	
2023	Oliver Tree	"Bounce"	Alone in a Crowd	
2023	Venbee	"Die Young" with Rudimental	Zero Experience	
2023	Oliver Tree	"One & Only"	Alone in a Crowd	
2023	Dopamine	"Feel It Deep Inside" with Sigala	Non-album single	
2023	Jack Curley	"Stand Still"	Non-album single	
2023	Calum Scott	"At Your Worst"	Avenoir	
2023	Marshmello	"Other Boys" with Dove Cameron	Non-album single	
2023	Aden Foyer	"Galileo Galilei"	The Ballet Girl	
2023	Say Now	"S.I.N.G.L.E"	Non-album single	
2023	Marshmello	"Dreaming" with Pink and Sting	Trustfall: Tour Deluxe Edition	
2023	Galantis	"Dreamteam" with Neon Trees	Rx	
2023	Måneskin	"Off My Face"	Rush! (Are U Coming?)	
2024	Kim MinSeok	"Back In Love" with Sam Ryder	Non-album single	
2024	Marshmello	"No Man's Land" with Venbee	Non-album single	
2024	Prinz	"Life Story"	Circle of Life - EP	
2024	Dua Lipa	"Training Season"	Radical Optimism	
2024	Chungha	"I'm Ready"	Eenie Meenie	
2024	ALLY	"Make it Hot" feat. Pink Sweat$	Non-album single	
2024	Kim Woo-jin	"I Like The Way"	I Like The Way - EP	
2024	Gryffin	"Magic" with babyidontlikeyou	Pulse	
2024	Marshmello	"Miles on It" with Kane Brown	The High Road	
2024	Zzz.	"I Moved Away"	SAM	
2024	Marshmello	"Don't Speak" with Sabrina Claudio	Non-album single	
2024	Alan Walker	"Barcelona" with Ina Wroldsen	Walkerworld 2.0	
2024	Katseye	"I'm Pretty"	SIS (Soft Is Strong) - EP	
2024	David Kushner	"Universe"	The Dichotomy	
2024	KSI	"Low"	Non-album single	
2024	Morgan Wallen	"Love Somebody"	I'm the Problem	
2024	KSI	"Dirty"	Non-album single	
2025	Marshmello	"Slow Motion" with Jonas Brothers	Greetings from Your Hometown	
2025	Lost Frequencies	"Dance in the Sunlight" feat. Bandit	Non-album single	
2025	Jin	"Nothing Without Your Love"	Echo - EP	
2025	Mae Muller	"In My Head"	My Island - EP	
2025	24kGoldn	"June"	Icarus - EP	
2025	Craig David	"So Special"	Commitment	
2025	BigXthaPlug	"24/7" feat. Ink	I Hope You're Happy	
2025	Ingrid Vårvik	"Ælsk nånn"	Bare en mann - EP	
2025	Poolside	"Otherside" with Thunder Jackson and Miiracles	Non-album single	
2026	Joyner Lucas	"Monsters"	ADHD 2: Reloaded	
2026	Muse	"Hush" feat. Ellie Goulding	The Wow! Signal	

== Awards and nominations ==
Year	Award	Category	Recipient(s)	Result	Ref.
2022	The BRIT Awards	Song of the Year	"Don't Play" (shared with Anne-Marie & KSI)	Nominated	
