= All Over the Place (KSI album) =

Studio album by KSI
- Released: 16 July 2021
- Genres: British hip hop; UK garage; pop; pop rap
- Length: 43:44
- Labels: RBC; BMG
- Producers: S-X; Diego Ave; Bankroll Got It; Mally Mall; Nana Rogues; Chambers; Matt Schwartz; Digital Farm Animals; Mojam; AJ Productions; Jacob Manson; Toddla T; M1 On The Beat; Show N Prove; Don Corleon; Ayo Beatz; Jake Gosling; Yoshi; Diztortion; Trobi; Menace; Sai On The Beat; Quix

KSI chronology
Dissimulation (2020)	All Over the Place (2021)

Singles from All Over the Place
- 1. "Really Love" Released: 23 October 2020; 2. "Don't Play" Released: 15 January 2021; 3. "Patience" Released: 12 March 2021; 4. "Holiday" Released: 18 June 2021; 5. "Swerve" Released: 1 July 2021; 6. "Lose" Released: 6 August 2021

Deluxe edition cover

All Over the Place is the second studio album by English influencer, boxer, and musician KSI. It was released by RBC Records and BMG on 16 July 2021. The album features guest appearances from Future, 21 Savage, Yungblud, Polo G, Anne-Marie, Digital Farm Animals, Craig David, Jay1, Deno, Gracey, Bugzy Malone, Rico Love, Lil Durk, and S-X. The deluxe edition was released on 31 August 2021. It features additional guest appearances from A1 x J1, Nevve, and Lil Wayne. Production was handled by a variety of record producers, including Digital Farm Animals, S-X, Matt Schwartz, Jacob Manson, Toddla T, Show N Prove, Don Corleon, Jake Gosling, Diztortion, and Quix, among others.

The album was preceded by the UK top three singles, "Really Love", "Don't Play", "Patience", and "Holiday". For the deluxe edition, it was preceded by only one single, "Lose". The album debuted atop the UK Albums Chart. In promotion, KSI performed a live concert, the KSI show the day after the release of the standard edition. His friends and fellow musicians, such as Digital Farm Animals, S-X, AJ Tracey, and others participated in the event.

== Release and promotion ==
All Over the Place was preceded by four UK top ten singles:

"Really Love", featuring English singer-songwriter Craig David and English record producer Digital Farm Animals, was released on 23 October 2020 as the album's lead single and it debuted at number three on the UK Singles Chart.

"Don't Play", a collaboration with English singer-songwriter Anne-Marie and Digital Farm Animals, was released on 15 January 2021 as the second single and it debuted at number two on the UK Singles Chart.

"Patience", featuring English singer-songwriter Yungblud and American rapper Polo G, was released on 12 March 2021 as the third single and it debuted at number three on the UK Singles Chart.

"Holiday" was released on 18 June 2021 as the album's fourth single and it debuted at number two on the UK Singles Chart.

British rapper Jay1's single "Swerve", which features a guest appearance from KSI, was released as the fifth single on 1 July 2021 and is included on the Platinum VIP edition of the album.

The lead and only single for the deluxe edition, "Lose", a collaboration with American rapper Lil Wayne, was released on 6 August 2021.

KSI headlined The SSE Arena, Wembley on 25 February 2022 in support of the album.

=== The KSI Show ===
To accompany the album's release, KSI headlined a livestream concert titled The KSI Show, which aired on the Moment House platform on 17 July 2021. KSI enlisted the help of Anne-Marie, Big Zuu, Craig David, Deno, Digital Farm Animals, Ella Henderson, Jay1, Nathan Dawe, Randolph, S-X, Swarmz, Tion Wayne and Yungblud as guest performers. AJ Tracey, Dan Bilzerian, Emile Heskey, Jonathan Ross, Logan Paul, Lorraine Kelly and the Sidemen also made guest appearances during the concert.

The KSI Show featured custom-built stages, costume changes and choreography by Black Skull Creative. The show also featured comedy sketches, written by KSI with Joe Chandler, Nick Wegener and James Farmer, who are notable for their work on the American animated sitcom, American Dad! A pre-show red carpet event, presented by Abbie McCarthy, was livestreamed to KSI's YouTube channel in the run-up to the main show.

=== Tour ===
List of concerts, showing date, city, country, venue, opening acts
Date	City	Country	Venue	Opening act(s)
Leg 1 — United Kingdom (2021)
27 August 2021 (Note: This concert was part of Leeds Festival.)	Leeds	England	Bramham Park	—N/a
29 August 2021 (Note: This concert was part of Reading Festival.)	Reading	England	Little John's Farm	—N/a
4 September 2021	London	England	PRYZM Kingston	—N/a
10 September 2021	Glasgow	Scotland	King Tut's Wah Wah Hut	—N/a
11 September 2021 (Note: This concert was part of TRNSMT Festival.)	Glasgow	Scotland	Glasgow Green	—N/a
12 September 2021 (Note: This concert was part of Parklife Festival.)	Manchester	England	Heaton Park	—N/a
25 September 2021 (Note: This concert was part of Labyrinth Festival.)	Manchester	England	Manchester Academy	—N/a
1 October 2021	Glasgow	Scotland	The Garage	—N/a
2 October 2021	Newcastle	England	Riverside	—N/a
3 October 2021	Hull	England	Hull Asylum	—N/a
5 October 2021	Birmingham	England	O2 Institute Birmingham	—N/a
6 October 2021	Bournemouth	England	The Old Fire Station	—N/a
7 October 2021	Bristol	England	SWX	—N/a
8 October 2021	Brighton	England	Concorde 2	—N/a
10 October 2021	Norwich	England	The Waterfront	—N/a
12 October 2021	Manchester	England	Manchester Academy 2	—N/a
13 October 2021	London	England	O2 Forum Kentish Town	—N/a
Leg 2 — United Kingdom (2022)
10 February 2022	Sheffield	England	O2 Academy Sheffield	S-X
11 February 2022	Liverpool	England	Liverpool Guild	S-X
12 February 2022	Dublin	Ireland	Olympia Theatre	S-X
13 February 2022	Dublin	Ireland	Olympia Theatre	S-X
15 February 2022	Exeter	England	Exeter Great Hall	S-X
16 February 2022	Southampton	England	Southampton Guildhall	S-X
17 February 2022	Cardiff	Wales	Cardiff Great Hall	S-X
19 February 2022	Nottingham	England	Rock City	S-X
21 February 2022	Newcastle	England	O2 City Hall Newcastle	S-X
22 February 2022	Glasgow	Scotland	SWG3	S-X
25 February 2022	London	England	Wembley Arena	S-X
12 May 2022	Oxford	England	O2 Academy Oxford	S-X
20 May 2022	Cambridge	England	Cambridge Junction	S-X
Leg 3 — Europe
6 September 2022	Stockholm	Sweden	Debaser Stand	—N/a
7 September 2022	Oslo	Norway	Vulkan Arena	—N/a
8 September 2022	Copenhagen	Denmark	Vega	—N/a
11 September 2022	Paris	France	Le Trabendo	—N/a
12 September 2022	Brussels	Belgium	Orangerie	—N/a
14 September 2022	Hamburg	Germany	Mojo Club	—N/a
15 September 2022	Cologne	Germany	Luxor	—N/a

== Critical reception ==
Professional ratings
Aggregate scores
Source	Rating
AnyDecentMusic?	5.9/10
Metacritic	63/100
Review scores
Source	Rating
Clash	7/10
Gigwise	5/10 stars
NME	3/5 stars
The Observer	3/5 stars
The Independent	3/5 stars
Vinyl Chapters	3.5/5

All Over the Place received generally positive reviews from critics. AnyDecentMusic stated the summary of other ratings and Metacritic did the same, but gave one positive review, three mixed reviews, and zero negative reviews.

Writing for Clash, Robin Murray gave the album a 7 out of 10, explaining that it "follows hot on the heels of his controversial debut, and the project's breadth and diversity definitely lives up to its title" and "a record marked by diversity, 'All Over The Place' is held together by its makers ambitions". Dale Maplethorpe of Gigwise felt that it is sort of a hit and miss, praising its diversity, and stated that "KSI is brilliant at making 'summer bops'", citing the songs "Don't Play", "Really Love", and "Gang Gang" as examples. Kyann-Sian Williams of NME magazine gave the album 3 stars out of 5, stating that KSI "makes another honest attempt at a pop–rap". Kadish Morris from The Observer rated it 3 stars out of 5, providing fidgets from genre to genre, "UK garage to drill, pop to Afro swing, but never quite finds its resting place". Writing for The Independent, Annabel Nugent gave it a 3 out of 5, stating that "is a bumper-to-bumper blending of genres buoyed along by some of music's major-leaguers". Imogen Lawlor gave it a 3.5 out of 5 and stated that the album is "clearly structured as KSI effortlessly navigates numerous genres" and "given that he covers so many genres (with varying success), KSI's credentials as a 'hip hop sensation' are questionable".

== Commercial performance ==
In the United Kingdom, All Over the Place debuted at number one on the UK Albums Chart, giving KSI his first chart-topper in the country, with first week sales of 34,328 album-equivalent units. 18,421 came from physical copies, with 5,227 of them being vinyl units. The album gathered 20.9 million streams, equating to an additional 13,389 units. It has been certified Gold by the BPI for surpassing 100,000 units in the country.

== Track listing ==
Standard edition
No.	Title	Writer(s)	Producer(s)	Length
1.	"The Moment"	Olajide Olatunji; Sam Gumbley	S-X	2:42
2.	"Number 2" (featuring Future and 21 Savage)	Olatunji; Nayvadius Wilburn; Shéyaa Abraham-Joseph; Diego Avendano; Joel Banks; Taylor Banks; Jamal Rashid; Joseph Chambers; Nana Rogues; Gumbley; Richard Butler Jr.; Ivory Scott; Aaron Ferrucci; Martell Smith Williams	Diego Ave; Bankroll Got It; Mally Mall; Chambers; Nana Rogues	2:53
3.	"Patience" (featuring Yungblud and Polo G)	Olatunji; Dominic Harrison; Taurus Bartlett; Matt Schwartz; Nicholas Gale; George Tizzard; Richard Parkhouse; James Bell; Gumbley; Avendano; Yoshiya Ady; Peter Jideonwo	Matt Schwartz; Digital Farm Animals	3:01
4.	"You"	Olatunji; Gale; Mustafa Omer; James Murray; Gumbley; Butler	Digital Farm Animals; Mojam	3:32
5.	"Don't Play" (with Anne-Marie and Digital Farm Animals)	Olatunji; Anne-Marie Nicholson; Gale; Omer; Murray; Andrew Murray; Gumbley; Richard Boardman; Pablo Bowman	Digital Farm Animals; Mojam	3:08
6.	"Really Love" (featuring Craig David and Digital Farm Animals)	Olatunji; Craig David; Gale; Omer; Murray; Uzoechi Emenike; Aminata Kabba; Ashley Livingstone; Paul Newman; Eugene Nwohia; Ronald Nwohia; Steve Wickham	Digital Farm Animals; Mojam	2:57
7.	"Gang Gang" (featuring Jay1 and Deno)	Olatunji; Jason Juami; Deno Mebrahitu; Ehijie Ohiomoba; Jacob Manson; Emmanuel Isong; Gumbley	AJ Productions; Jacob Manson	2:43
8.	"Rent Free" (featuring Gracey)	Olatunji; Grace Barker; Thomas Bell; Adrian McLeod	Toddla T	2:44
9.	"Madness"	Olatunji; Mozis Aduu; Gumbley	M1 on the Beat	2:58
10.	"Silly" (featuring Bugzy Malone)	Olatunji; Aaron Davis; Ellis Taylor; Gumbley	Show N Prove	2:46
11.	"Flash It" (featuring Rico Love)	Olatunji; Butler; Gumbley; Donovan Bennett	Don Corleon	3:24
12.	"No Time" (featuring Lil Durk)	Olatunji; Durk Banks; Gumbley; Rashid; Avendano; Chambers	S-X; Mally Mall; Diego Ave; Chambers	3:00
13.	"No Pressure"	Olatunji; Jahmere Tylon; Joseph Gosling	Ayo Beatz	2:18
14.	"Holiday"	Olatunji; Gale; Jake Gosling; William Vaughan	Digital Farm Animals; Gosling	3:13
15.	"Sleeping with the Enemy" (featuring S-X)	Olatunji; Gumbley; Ady; Deskin; William Egan IV	S-X; Yoshi	2:25
16.	"Swerve" (Jay1 featuring KSI)	Juami; Olatunji; Raoul Chen; Bryan du Chantier	Diztortion; Trobi	2:25

Deluxe edition
No.	Title	Writer(s)	Producer(s)	Length
17.	"Little Bit of Fun" (featuring Anne-Marie)	Olatunji; Nicholson; Bell; McLeod; Abby Keen	Toddla T	2:38
18.	"Know You" (featuring S-X and A1 x J1)	Olatunji; Gumbley; Joshua Somerkun; Phinehas Waweru; Gale	Digital Farm Animals	2:28
19.	"Smoke" (featuring Nevve)	Olatunji; Jono Schnell; William Rappaport; Michelle Buzz	Quix	3:13
20.	"Jimmy Neutron"	Olatunji; Adnan Khan; Mark Lwamusai	Menace; Sai on the Beat	2:58
21.	"Lose" (with Lil Wayne)	Olatunji; Dwayne Carter Jr.; Gale; Scott; Gumbley; Jideonwo; David Snyder; Jochanan Samana	Digital Farm Animals	3:25

== Credits and personnel ==
Credits adapted from Tidal.

- KSI – vocals (all tracks), songwriting (all tracks), hand clap (14)
- S-X – production (1, 12, 15), songwriting (15), engineering (5), vocals (15)
- Adam Lunn – engineering (1, 2, 4, 6–13, 15)
- Joe LaPorta – engineering (1–4, 7–15)
- Niko Marzouca – engineering (1, 2, 7–15)
- Rob MacFarlane – engineering (1, 2, 4, 5, 7–13, 15)
- Robert Marks – engineering (1, 2, 7–13, 15)
- Future – songwriting (2), vocals (2)
- 21 Savage – songwriting (2), vocals (2)
- Diego Ave – production (2, 12), songwriting (2, 3, 12)
- Bankroll Got It – production (2), songwriting (2)
- Mally Mall – production (2, 12), songwriting (2, 12)
- Nana Rogues – production (2), songwriting (2)
- Chambers – production (2, 12), songwriting (2, 12)
- Rico Love – songwriting (2, 4, 11), vocals (11)
- Ivory Scott – songwriting (2)
- Aaron Ferrucci – songwriting (2)
- Kevin Grainger – engineering (2, 5–13, 15)
- Matt Schwartz – songwriting (3), production (3), engineering (2, 7–13)
- Yungblud – songwriting (3), vocals (3)
- Polo G – songwriting (3), vocals (3)
- Digital Farm Animals – production (4–6), songwriting (3–6, 14), bass (5), drums (5), keyboards (5), percussion (5, 14), piano (5), programming (5), sound effects (5), strings (5), synthesizer (5), backing vocals (14), hand clap (14)
- Red Triangle – songwriting (3)
- Yami – songwriting (3)
- Yoshi – production (15), songwriting (3, 15)
- Peter Jideonwo – songwriting (3)
- John Hanes – engineering (3, 4)
- Serban Ghenea – engineering (3, 4)
- Mojam – production (4–6), songwriting (4–6), drums (5), keyboards (5), programming (5), sound effects (5), synthesizer (5)
- Anne-Marie – songwriting (5), vocals (5)
- Andrew Murray – songwriting (5), harp (5), strings (5)
- Richard Boardman – songwriting (3)
- Pablo Bowman – songwriting (3)
- Cameron Gower Poole – engineering (5)
- Craig David – songwriting (6), vocals (6)
- MNEK – songwriting (6)
- KABBA – songwriting (6)
- Ashley Livingstone – songwriting (6)
- Paul Newman – songwriting (6)
- Eugene Nwohia – songwriting (6)
- Ronald Nwohia – songwriting (6)
- Steve Wickham – songwriting (6)
- Deno – songwriting (7), vocals (7)
- Jay1 – songwriting (7, 16), vocals (7, 16)
- AJ Productions – production (7), songwriting (7)
- Jacob Manson – production (7), songwriting (7)
- Eight9FLY – songwriting (7)
- Gracey – songwriting (8), vocals (8)
- Toddla T – production (8), songwriting (8)
- Adrian McLeod – songwriting (8)
- M1 on the Beat – production (9), songwriting (9)
- Bugzy Malone – songwriting (10), vocals (10)
- Toddla T – production (10), songwriting (10)
- Don Corleon – production (11), songwriting (11)
- Lil Durk – songwriting (12), vocals (12)
- Ayo Beatz – production (13), songwriting (13)
- Joseph Gosling – songwriting (13)
- Jake Gosling – production (14), songwriting (14), drums (14), keyboard (14), hand clap (14), percussion (14), programming (14)
- William Vaughan – songwriting (14), electric guitar (14)
- Matthew Brettle – drums (14), guitar (14), percussion (14), programming (14), engineering (14)
- Geoff Swan – engineering (14)
- Dillon Deskin – songwriting (15)
- William Egan IV – songwriting (15)
- Diztortion – production (16), songwriting (16)
- Trobi – production (16), songwriting (16)
- Dukus – mixing (16), mastering (16)
- Sam Harper – engineering (16)

== Charts ==
=== Weekly charts ===
Chart performance for All Over the Place
Chart (2021)	Peak position
Australian Albums (ARIA)	1
Austrian Albums (Ö3 Austria)	39
Belgian Albums (Ultratop Flanders)	6
Canadian Albums (Billboard)	16
Danish Albums (Hitlisten)	5
Dutch Albums (Album Top 100)	12
Finnish Albums (Suomen virallinen lista)	17
Icelandic Albums (Tónlistinn)	7
Irish Albums (Official Charts)	2
Lithuanian Albums (AGATA)	7
New Zealand Albums (RMNZ)	5
Norwegian Albums (VG-lista)	3
Scottish Albums (Official Charts)	1
Swedish Albums (Sverigetopplistan)	13
Swiss Albums (Schweizer Hitparade)	57
UK Albums (Official Charts)	1
UK Independent Albums (Official Charts)	1
UK R&B Albums (Official Charts)	1
US Billboard 200	94
US Independent Albums (Billboard)	17

=== Year-end charts ===
Year-end chart performance for All Over the Place
Chart (2021)	Position
UK Albums (OCC)	46

== Certifications ==
Certifications for All Over the Place
Region	Certification	Certified units/sales
New Zealand (RMNZ)	Gold	7,500^{‡}
United Kingdom (BPI)	Gold	100,000^{‡}
^{‡} Sales+streaming figures based on certification alone.

== Release history ==
Release dates and formats for All Over the Place
Region	Date	Format(s)	Edition	Label	Ref.
Various	16 July 2021	Digital download; streaming; LP; CD; cassette	Standard	RBC; BMG	
Various	27 August 2021	Digital download; streaming	Deluxe	RBC; BMG	
