= RBC Records =

Record label

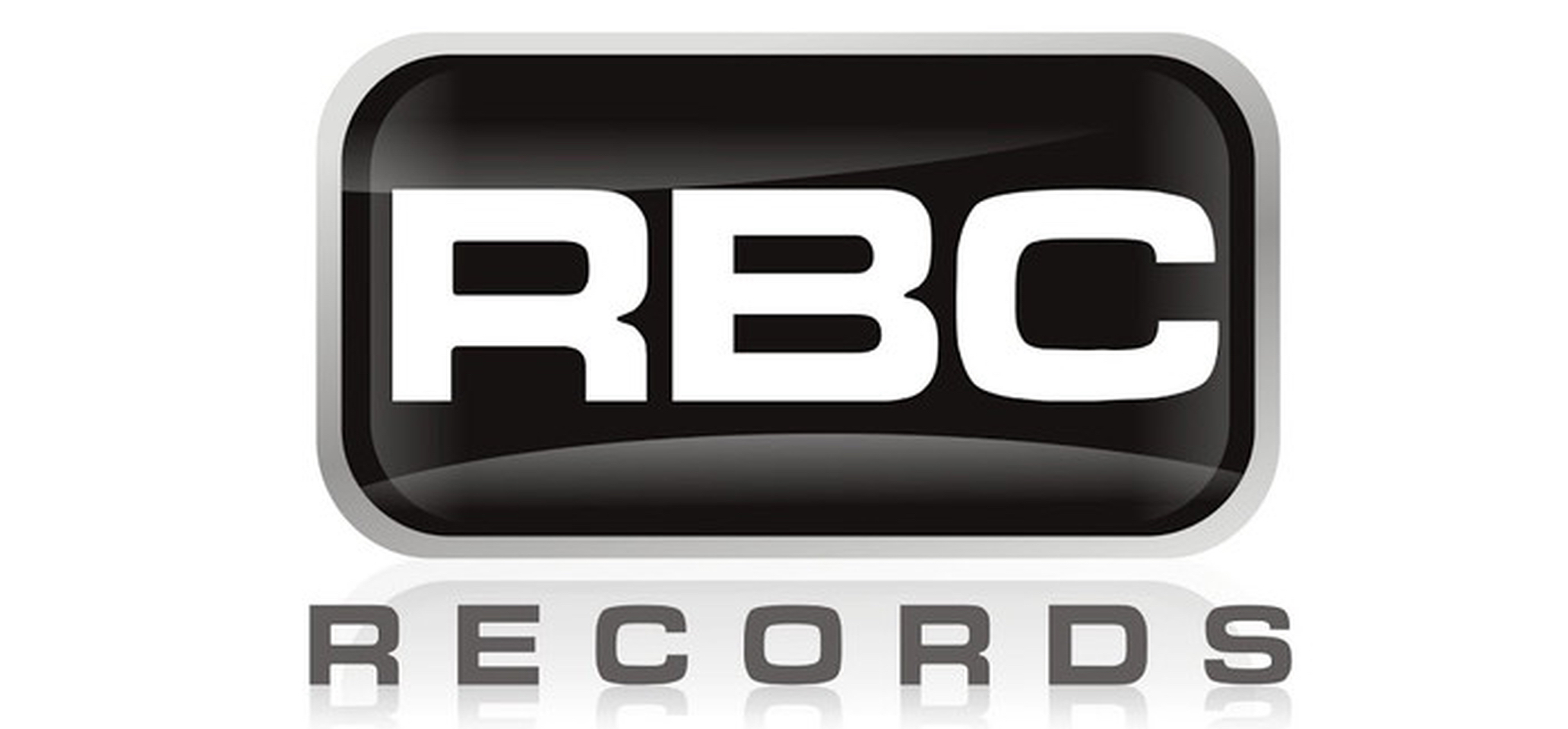
- Parent company: BMG Rights Management
- Founded: 2001
- Founder: Brian Shafton, Bob Grossi
- Distributors: Universal Music Group (physical); BMG Rights Management (digital) (current); AMPED Distribution; E1 Music; Fontana (former)
- Genre: Hip hop
- Country of origin: U.S.
- Official website: rbcrecords.com

RBC Records is an American online independent record label and management company founded by partners Brian Shafton and Bob Grossi. It provides artists and independent labels with a full-service "virtual label" alternative to signing with a major label. RBC provides distribution, sales, marketing, online publicity, radio promotion, video promotion, product management, and creative services consulting to artists and management. The company announced in 2013 that it would start producing and distributing films under the name RBC Films.

In September 2018, BMG Rights Management acquired RBC for an undisclosed fee.

== Notable artists ==
- Bali Baby
- Beeda Weeda (RBC)
- Boosie Badazz (Trill Entertainment/RBC)
- Brotha Lynch Hung (Madesicc Muzicc/RBC)
- Cappadonna (RBC)
- Chief Keef (Glory Boyz Entertainment/RBC)
- C-Murder (RBC)
- E-40 (Sick Wid' It Records/RBC)
- EPMD (RBC)
- Gucci Mane (1017 Brick Squad/RBC)
- Mike Jones (Money Train/RBC)
- Keak Da Sneak (RBC)
- Krayzie Bone (BTNH Worldwide/RBC)
- Kurupt (RBC)
- Layzie Bone (Harmony Howse/BTNH/RBC)
- Lyfe Jennings
- Method Man (RBC)
- Pac Div (RBC)
- Philthy Rich (Livewire/RBC)
- Run the Jewels (RBC)
- Skeme (RBC)
- Tech N9ne (Strange Music/RBC)
- Webbie (Trill Entertainment/RBC)
- The Regime (Smoke-A-Lot/RBC)
- Yukmouth (Smoke-A-Lot/RBC)
- Lil Reese (Def Jam Records/RBC)
- Fredo Santana (Savage Squad Records/RBC)
- KSI (Beerus Ltd/RBC)
- S-X (RBC)
- Mick Jenkins (RBC)

== Discography ==
=== 2007 ===
- Spider Loc – The West Kept Secret: The Prequel (2007)

=== 2008 ===
- Krayzie Bone – The Fixtape Vol. 1: Smoke on This (2008)

=== 2009 ===
- Krayzie Bone – The Fixtape Vol. 2: Just One Mo Hit (2009)

=== 2010 ===
- Krayzie Bone – The Fixtape Vol. 3: Lyrical Paraphernalia (2010)
- Yukmouth – Free at Last (2010)

=== 2011 ===
- Webbie – Savage Life 3 (2011)
- Layzie Bone – The Definition (2011)
- Layzie Bone – The Meaning (2011)
- Pac Div – The DiV (2011)
- Krayzie Bone – The Fixtape Vol. 4: Under the Influence (2011)

=== 2012 ===
- Pac Div – GMB (2012)
- Cashis - "The Art of Dying" (2012)
- Keak Da Sneak – Cheddar Cheese I Say (2012)
- Skeme - Alive & Living (2012)
- Chris Travis - Pizza and codeine (2012)

=== 2013 ===
- Krayzie Bone – Quick Fix: Less Drama. More Music. (Level 1) (2013)
- Tech N9ne - Something Else (2013)
- Yukmouth & The Regime – Dragon Gang' (2013)
- Philthy Rich – N.E.R.N.L. 2 (2013)
- Webbie – Savage Life 4 (2013)
- Cappadonna - Eyrth, Wynd and Fyre (2013)

=== 2014 ===
- Lil Mouse - Michael Mouse Myers (2014)
- Novi Novak - One Size Fits All (2014)

=== 2015 ===
- Krayzie Bone - Chasing The Devil (2015)

=== 2017 ===
- Chief Keef - Two Zero One Seven (2017)
- Chief Keef - Thot Breaker (2017)

=== 2020 ===
- KSI - Dissimulation (2020)

=== 2021 ===
- KSI - All Over The Place (2021)

=== 2022 ===
- EPMD—We Mean Business (reissue)

=== 2023 ===
- Brotha Lynch Hung—Turminator X Torment
- Chief Keef—Mansion Musick
- Run the Jewels—RTJ Qu4tro
- Mick Jenkins—The Patience
