= Jump Around (disambiguation) =

"Jump Around" is a song by American hip hop group House of Pain.

Jump Around may also refer to:

- Jump Around (EP), a 2016 EP by British musician KSI
  - Jump Around (KSI song), a single from the EP
- The Fresh Beat Band, an American musical children's sitcom, originally known as The JumpArounds
- Jump Around (Ireland), 1995's The Den summer replacement
- "Jump Around", a tradition at Camp Randall Stadium
- "Jump Around", a tradition by Wisconsin Badgers football
