= Evander Holyfield vs. Vitor Belfort =

Boxing match

No Holds Barred
- Date: September 11, 2021
- Venue: Seminole Hard Rock Hotel & Casino Hollywood, Miami, Florida

Tale of the tape
| Boxer | Evander Holyfield | Vitor Belfort |
| Nickname | "The Real Deal" | "The Phenom" |
| Hometown | Atmore, Alabama, U.S. | Rio de Janeiro, Brazil |
| Pre-fight record | 44–10–2 (29 KOs) | 1–0 (1 KO) (Boxing); 26–14–1 (18 KOs) (MMA) |
| Height | 6 ft 2 1/2 in (189 cm) | 6 ft 0 in (183 cm) |
| Weight | 225.4 lb (102 kg) | 206.2 lb (94 kg) |
| Style | Orthodox | Southpaw |
| Recognition | Former undisputed cruiserweight champion Former undisputed heavyweight champion | Former UFC Light Heavyweight Champion |

Result
- Belfort wins via first-round technical knockout

Evander Holyfield vs. Vitor Belfort billed as "No Holds Barred", was an exhibition boxing match between former undisputed heavyweight world champion Evander Holyfield and former UFC light-heavyweight champion Vitor Belfort on September 11, 2021, at the Seminole Hard Rock Hotel & Casino Hollywood in Miami, Florida. Belfort won the fight by TKO at 1:49 of the first round. The fight sold 150,000 PPV buys.

== Background ==
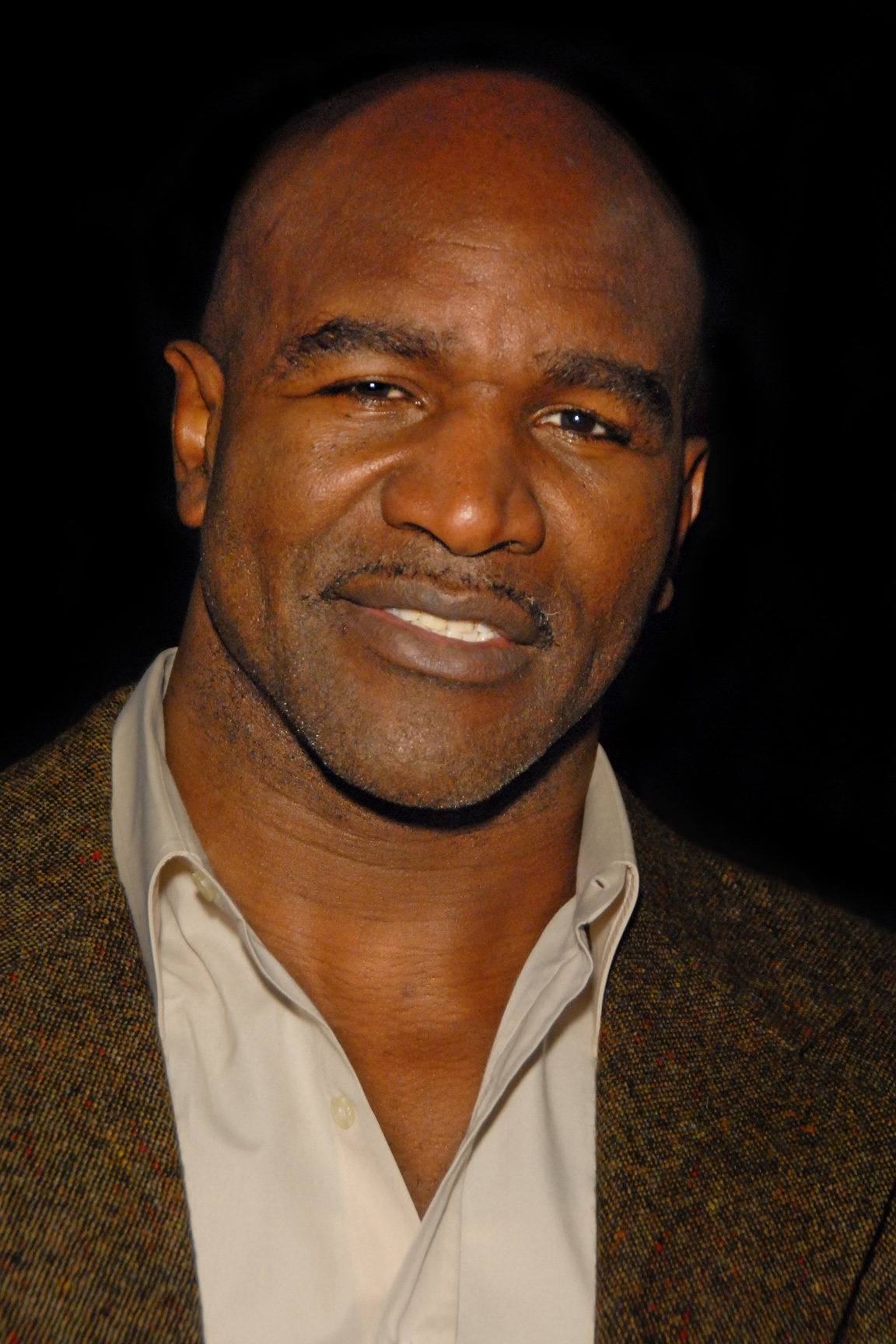
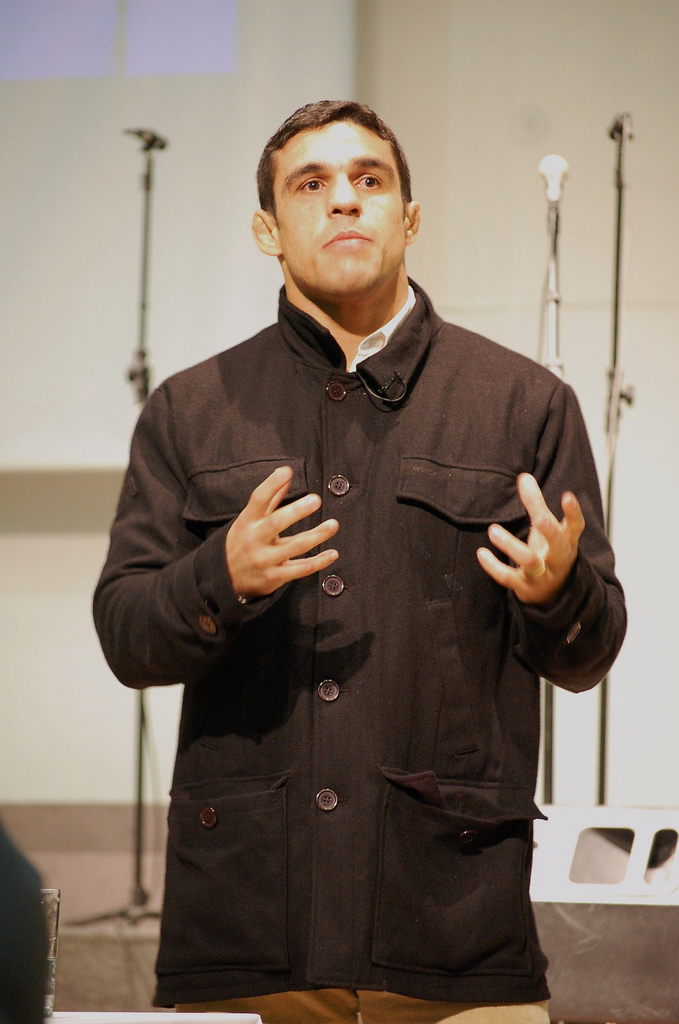
Evander Holyfield (left) and Vitor Belfort (right).

On June 17, 2021, it was announced that Oscar De La Hoya would return to the ring in an exhibition bout against Vitor Belfort on September 11, 2021, under the Triller Fight Club banner. On July 21, it was announced that the match would not be an exhibition, and instead would be an official boxing match sanctioned by the California State Athletic Commission.

On September 3, De La Hoya announced that he would not be fighting Belfort due to contracting COVID-19. In a message to his fans, he stated that he was fully vaccinated and receiving hospital treatment. In turn, it was announced that former heavyweight champion Evander Holyfield will be stepping in to face Belfort, and that the event was being moved from California to Florida.

The undercard was set to feature an eight-round cruiserweight bout between former UFC Middleweight champion Anderson Silva and former UFC Light-heavyweight champion Tito Ortiz, as well as a heavyweight showdown between former heavyweight champion David Haye and businessman Joe Fournier.

On September 7, it was announced that there would be an alternate commentary program for the show featuring the 45th President of the United States Donald Trump, and his son Donald Trump Jr. UFC fighter Jorge Masvidal joined the alternate commentary feed alongside the President. The standard commentary team was reported to be the combination of former HBO commentator Jim Lampley and former two-time welterweight champion Shawn Porter. However on September 9, it was announced that Lampley would be opting-out of the event, and that rapper 50 Cent will be replacing him.

== Broadcasting ==
The card was the third event of Triller Fight Club, a new series of boxing events promoted by the video-sharing app Triller (who had previously partnered with Legends Only League for the 2020 Mike Tyson vs. Roy Jones Jr.) fight card and rapper Snoop Dogg.

The PPV was distributed via cable and satellite television providers in the United States and Canada, and also via the combat sports streaming service Fite TV (which was acquired by Triller during the direct lead-up to Jake Paul vs. Ben Askren fight).

The event aired in Brazil on Combate, and in Hispanic America on ESPN.

== Fight card ==
| Weight Class | | vs. | | Method | Round | Time | Notes |
|---|---|---|---|---|---|---|---|
| Heavyweight | (Brazil) Vitor Belfort | def. | (United States) Evander Holyfield | TKO | 1/8 | 1:49 | Exhibition match |
| Cruiserweight | (Brazil) Anderson Silva | def. | (United States) Tito Ortiz | KO | 1/8 | 1:22 | Pro Bout |
| Super featherweight | (Republic of Ireland) Jono Carroll | def. | (United States) Andy Vences | MD | 10/10 |
| Heavyweight | (United Kingdom) David Haye | def. | (United Kingdom) Joe Fournier | UD | 8/8 | | Exhibition match |

Belfort won the fight by a TKO at 1:49 in the first round.

== Pay-per-view numbers ==
According to first reports, the fight generated around 150,000 pay-per-view buys.
