= Reykon =

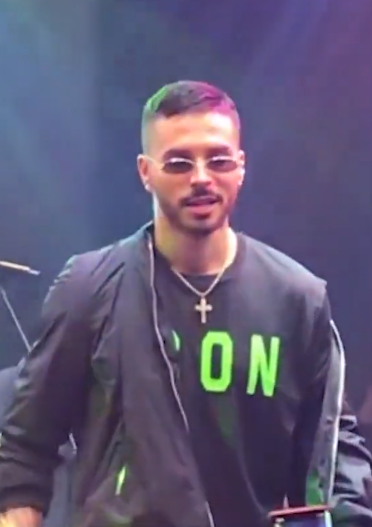
- Reykon in 2019

Background information
- Born: Andrés Felipe Robledo Londoño; 12 December 1986 (age 39); Medellín, Antioquia, Colombia
- Genres: Reggaeton
- Occupation: Singer
- Instrument: Vocals
- Years active: 2007–present
- Labels: JM World; Warner Latina
- Spouse: Maria Alejandra Correa (?-2016)
- Partner: Luisa Castro (2021-2023)
- Children: 1

Andrés Felipe Robledo Londoño (born 12 December 1986), better known as Reykon "El Líder" "Pel mazo", is a Colombian reggaeton musician. He is considered one of the biggest proponents of Latin America's reggaeton music genre. He is from Envigado, Antioquia.

== Musical career ==
Since 2011, he has gained international fame releasing several songs including, "Se Aloca", "Te Gateo", "Tu Cuerpo me Llama", "El Besito", "Sin Miedo", "No Molestes Mas", "Tuturuwa", "Mi Noche", and "Cuando Te Vi".

In 2012, he collaborated with Puerto Rican artist Daddy Yankee to release the song "Señorita" which quickly charted at number 1 in several Latin American countries, including Peru, Ecuador, and Chile.

In 2013, it was a successful year for him releasing the hit song "Mi Noche" which reached 60 million views on YouTube. His next single that he released in 2014 was called "Secretos" which was also successful and charted at number 1 on HTV.

In 2015, he signed with the music label Warner Latina. The label was assured that this signing would bring both of them success. Gabriela Martínez General Manager of Warner Music Latina stated that, "There is no better way to start of 2015 knowing that the talent of Reykon now forms part of the family; we share the same vision of having Reykon being a big star in Latin music."

Also in 2015, he released another song with Daddy Yankee called "Imaginádote" which charted on the Billboard charts and Monitor Latino in Colombia. He also got the chance to collaborate with Bebe Rexha and release the song "All The Way". This song was one of the songs nominated to be the official theme of the Copa Oro 2015.

He was also chosen to be one of the judges on Factor XF 2015.

Reykon was the special guest of a party and was invited by Teodoro Nguema Obiang Mangue, also known as Teodorin, son of the president of Equatorial Guinea, Teodoro Obiang Nguema Mbasogo. He was told by Teodorin when they first shook hands,"I know all your songs, I am a big fan, I am delighted to have you in my country." He is one of the very few artists to perform over there.

In 2017, his single Dejame Te Explico was awarded Platinum status in Colombia.

On 4 May 2018, he released his first studio album titled, El Lider. It has features from several urban artists including Daddy Yankee, Nicky Jam and Luigi 21 Plus.

== Personal life ==
In 2016, Reykon underwent surgery on his vocal chords and this temporarily halted his musical career due to the length of recovery.

In 2021, Reykon was involved in an altercation in Miami with Joe Fournier, a professional boxer. This altercation lead to a Triller boxing match on the Jake Paul vs. Ben Askren undercard. It has been scrutinized as Fournier, an experienced pro, is fighting a boxing amateur.

== Discography ==
=== Studio albums ===
- El Líder 1 (2010)
- El Líder 2 (2012)
- El Lider (2018)
- 12-12 (2023)

=== Singles ===
- "La Santa"
- "Señorita"
- "Sin Miedo"
- "No molestes Más"
- "Tuturuwa"
- "Cuando Te Vi"
- "Secretos"
- "Disfruta la Vida"
- "El Error"
- "Selfie"
- "El Chisme"
- "El Chisme remix" (featuring J Alvarez And Kevin Roldan)
- "Dejame Te Explico"
- "Pa' Eso" (featuring Bryant Myers)
- "TBT"
- "Mala"
- "Kiss (El Último Beso)" (featuring Kapla Y Miky)
- "La Suite"
- "Mochilera" (featuring Kapo)
- "11:11" (featuring Beéle)
- "Bandidos"
- "Perro Fiel"
- "Rulay"
- "Baila Baila"
- "Bandido" (featuring B'rek)
- "Angelito"

=== Collaborations ===
- "Señorita" (featuring Daddy Yankee)
- "Rapampam" (featuring Farruko)
- "Secretos" Remix (featuring Nicky Jam)
- "Se Aloca" (featuring J Balvin)
- "Renuncio" Remix (featuring Giovanny Ayala)
- "Tu Cuerpo Me Llama" (featuring Los Mortal Kombat)
- "301" (featuring Karol G)
- "Cuando Te Vi" (featuring Lil Silvio & El Vega)
- "La Noche es Una" (featuring Sonny & Vaech)
- "Mi Noche" (featuring Kannon)
- "El Besito" Remix (featuring Pasabordo)
- "Te Gateo" (featuring Pipe Calderon)
- "Te lo Juro Por Ti" (featuring Small)
- "Con Mi Flow" (featuring Magic Juan)
- "Cocoloco" (featuring Juancho Style)
- "Déjate Amar" Remix (featuring Yandel and D.Ozi)
- "Tal Como Eres" Remix (featuring Divino, Ñejo and J Álvarez)
- "Amor De Primavera" (featuring Lucas Arnau)
- "Imaginándote" (featuring Daddy Yankee)
- "Aquí No Paso Na" (featuring Golpe a Golpe)
- "Niña Bonita" (featuring Andre Marcel)
- "Hagamos Algo" (featuring Dani y Magneto)
- "Tu Ángel Guardián" (featuring Pipe Calderon)
- "Ella Entra En Calor" (featuring Mosta Man)
- "El Error" Remix (featuring Zion & Lennox)
- "De Sol a Sol" (featuring Alkilados, Sebastian Yatra and Martina La Peligrosa)
- "All The Way" (featuring Bebe Rexha)
- "Nuestro Planeta" (Kali Uchis featuring Reykon)
- "El Chisme Remix" (featuring J Alvarez And Kevin Roldan)
- "Brindare" (featuring Maja)
- "Delirio" (featuring Andy Rivera)
- "Pa Eso" (featuring Bryant Myers)
- "Bum Bum Dale Dale" (Maite Perroni featuring Reykon)
- "Medellín" (Kevin Roldan featuring Reykon and Ryan Castro)

== Filmography ==
Year	Title	Role
2015	Factor XF	Winning Judge

Year	Title	Role
2020	Loco Por Vos	Manuela Valdés

== Awards and nominations ==
=== Premios Nuestra Tierra ===
Year	Category	Result
2010	Mejor Nuevo Artista	Nominated
2010	Interpretación urbana del año por Se Aloca (featuring J Balvin)	Nominated
2011	Canción del año por "La Santa"	Nominated
2011	Artista urbano del año	Nominated
2011	Artista del público	Nominated
2011	Canción urbana del año por "La Santa"	Nominated
2011	Video del año por "La Santa"	Nominated
2011	Canción del público por "La Santa"	Nominated
2011	Twittero del año	Nominated
2012	Artista urbano del año	Nominated
2012	Artista del público	Nominated
2012	Canción urbana del año por "Sin Miedo"	Won
2012	Canción del público por "Sin Miedo"	Nominated
2013	Artista urbano del año	Nominated
2013	Artista del público	Nominated
2013	Canción urbana del año por "Señorita" (ft. Daddy Yankee)	Nominated
2014	Artista Urbano del año	Nominated

== Professional boxing record ==
1 fight	0 wins	1 loss
By knockout	0	1

No.	Result	Record	Opponent	Type	Round, time	Date	Location	Notes
1	Loss	0–1	Joe Fournier	RTD	2 (6), 3:00	Apr 17, 2021	Mercedes-Benz Stadium, Atlanta, Georgia, U.S.	
