= Lamborghini (song) =

2015 single by KSI featuring P Money

Single by KSI featuring P Money
- Released: 23 March 2015
- Recorded: 2014–2015
- Genre: British hip hop; trap
- Length: 2:56
- Label: Dcypha
- Songwriters: Olajide Olatunji; Paris Moore-Williams; Derek Safo; Tumai Salih
- Producer: DJ Turkish

KSI singles chronology
"No Sleep" (2013)	"Lamborghini" (2015)	"Keep Up" (2015)

P Money singles chronology
"Reload" (2012)	"Lamborghini" (2015)	"10/10" (2015)

Music video
- "Lamborghini" on YouTube

"Lamborghini" is the debut single by British YouTuber and rapper KSI. The song features a guest appearance from British rapper P Money. It was produced by DJ Turkish. The song was released for digital download and streaming on 23 March 2015 by Dcypha Productions as a standalone single. The song charted at number 30 in the United Kingdom and number 61 in Ireland. An accompanying music video was released on 25 March 2015. A remix to the song, titled Lambo Refuelled, was released on 8 January 2016 as a part of KSI's EP Keep Up featuring Sway, Scrufizzer and Youngs Teflon.

== Commercial performance ==
The song entered the UK Singles Chart at number 30, making it KSI's seventh highest-charting single in the UK to date. It dropped to number 68 and number 96 over the following two weeks, before dropping out of the top 100. The song spent a total of six weeks on the UK R&B Singles Chart, peaking at number 7. KSI reacted to the commercial success of the song on Twitter, saying "thanks to everyone who listened to Lamborghini on Spotify and bought on iTunes!!! Didn't even think I would get in the top 40 man".

== Music video ==
The music video, directed by Jak X, was filmed in London in February 2015 and was uploaded to KSI's YouTube channel on 25 March 2015. It has 112 million views, making it KSI's 2nd most-viewed music video to date (second to Thick of It). KSI's purple Lamborghini Aventador prominently appears in the music video.

== Credits and personnel ==
Credits adapted from Tidal.

- KSI – vocals, songwriter
- P Money – vocals, songwriter
- Sway – songwriter
- DJ Turkish – producer, songwriter

== Charts ==
Chart (2015)	Peak position
Ireland (IRMA)	61
Scotland Singles (OCC)	28
UK Singles (OCC)	30
UK Hip Hop/R&B (OCC)	7
UK Indie (OCC)	2

== Release history ==
Region	Date	Format	Label	Ref.
Various	23 March 2015	Digital download; streaming	Dcypha	
