= Friends with Benefits (song) =

2016 song by KSI and MNDM

Single by KSI and MNDM

from the EP Jump Around
- Released: 29 July 2016
- Length: 2:46
- Label: Island; Universal
- Songwriter(s): Olajide Olatunji; Derek Safo; Tumai Salih; Charles Cook; Faried Jhauw; Kris Coutinho
- Producer(s): MNDM; Sway; DJ Turkish; Charles Cook; Faried Jhauw

KSI singles chronology
"Goes Off" (2016)	"Friends with Benefits" (2016)	"Jump Around" (2016)

Music video
- "Friends with Benefits" on YouTube

"Friends with Benefits" (commonly abbreviated to its initials "FWB") is a song by British YouTuber and recording artist KSI and Dutch record production trio MNDM. It was released on 29 July 2016 by Island Records as the second single from KSI's second extended play (EP), Jump Around (2016). The song's lyrics centre around engaging in a no-strings-attached relationship.

"Friends with Benefits" debuted at number 69 on the UK Singles Chart. The song's music video was released on 5 August 2016 and stars KSI alongside a no-strings-attached friend in a series of silly vignettes which show the pair dressing up as various characters to illustrate some choice lyrics from the song. Scenes include KSI dressing up as Elvis Presley, Jimi Hendrix and Kendrick Lamar.

== Background and release ==
"Friends with Benefits"
A 16-second sample of the chorus, performed by KSI, in which he sings about engaging in a no-strings-attached relationship with a ladyfriend.

"Friends with Benefits" was written and recorded during a recording studio session in Amsterdam, Netherlands, in February 2016, as documented in KSI's YouTube vlog titled "Amsterdam Music Trip". On 18 July 2016, KSI revealed the song's title, cover art and release date via his social media pages. "Friends with Benefits" was released for digital download and streaming on 29 July 2016 by Island Records, a division of Universal Music Group.

== Music video ==
The music video for "Friends with Benefits" was filmed in the United States in the summer of 2016. It was released to KSI's YouTube channel on 5 August 2016 and has received 50 million views. The video's opening scenes show KSI and several of his Laid in America (2016) co-stars, including Caspar Lee, Alex Wassabi and Gerry Bednob, exiting a limousine upon arrival at a premiere of their film, before walking down a red carpet.

The remainder of the video stars KSI alongside American model Jena Frumes, who plays the role of his no-strings-attached friend, in a series of silly vignettes which show the pair dressing up as various characters to illustrate some choice lyrics from the song. Scenes show the pair dressing up as penguins, a bride and a groom and a pimp and his girl, as well as KSI dressing up as an old man, Tony Montana from Scarface, Elvis Presley, Jimi Hendrix and Kendrick Lamar. At the end of the music video, there is a 15 seconds-long teaser of the music video for KSI's next single "Jump Around" (2016), featuring American rapper Waka Flocka Flame, which was later released on 3 October 2016.

== Commercial performance ==
In the United Kingdom, "Friends with Benefits" debuted at number 69 on the UK Singles Chart. The song dropped to number 78 the following week, before dropping out of the chart. "Friends with Benefits" also debuted at number 12 on the UK Hip Hop and R&B Singles Chart and spent a total of seven weeks on the chart.

== Credits and personnel ==
Credits adapted from Tidal.

- KSI – songwriting, vocals
- MNDM – production
- Sway – production, songwriting
- DJ Turkish – production, songwriting, mixing, mastering
- Charles Cook – production, songwriting
- Faried Jhauw – production, songwriting, drums, recording engineering
- Kris Coutinho – songwriting, drums, recording engineering
- Rutti Cruise – recording engineering
- Denise Kroes – additional vocals
- Gia Re Lodge-O'Meally – additional vocals

== Charts ==
Chart performance for "Friends with Benefits"
Chart (2016)	Peak position
Scotland (OCC)	43
UK Singles (OCC)	69
UK Singles Downloads (OCC)	45
UK Hip Hop/R&B (OCC)	12

== Release history ==
Release dates and formats for "Friends with Benefits"
Region	Date	Format(s)	Label(s)	Ref.
Various	29 July 2016	Digital download; streaming	Island; Universal	
