= Malea Rose =

American actress, writer, producer, and entrepreneur

- Born: Malea Rose Richardson; Kauai, United States of America
- Occupations: Actress, writer, producer, entrepreneur
- Years active: 2007 - Present

Malea Rose is an American actress, writer, producer, and entrepreneur. She is known for television roles on Entourage, New Girl, Two and a Half Men, and Hello Ladies, and appeared opposite Halle Berry in the 2017 film Kidnap. In 2021, she founded the skincare company Vie En Rose.

== Early life ==
Rose was born and raised on the North Shore of Kauai, Hawaii. She began performing at the age of 5 with the Kauai Community Theater Group, and participated in musical theater and singing competitions throughout her childhood. She performed at Camp Winnarainbow, a camp started by Wavy Gravy and members of The Grateful Dead.

Rose became a competitive surfer at age 11, winning multiple contests including The Roxy Pro, and was sponsored by Hurley.

At age 14, she began hosting her own radio show on KKCR.

Rose graduated as valedictorian from Kula High School at the age of 16 and moved to California to attend Chapman University, where she earned a BFA in Theater.

== Career ==
=== Acting ===
Rose has over 20 film and television credits. She appeared in guest roles on Entourage, New Girl, Two and a Half Men, Hello Ladies, and Legit. In 2017, she appeared opposite Halle Berry in the action film Kidnap. She is a member of the Upright Citizens Brigade.

=== Producing ===
In 2018, Rose partnered with two-time Oscar winner Paul Haggis to develop a miniseries called Dark Paradise, based on the Massie Trial in Oahu. Rose is writing, producing, and starring in the project, which is based on the book Honor Killing by David E. Stannard. Scooter Braun's SB Projects is attached to produce.

In April 2021, Rose served as Executive Producer and Creative Director of the Triller Fight Club pay-per-view event at Mercedes Benz Stadium in Atlanta, Georgia. The event featured the Jake Paul vs. Ben Askren bout with musical performances by Justin Bieber, Snoop Dogg and Mount Westmore, The Black Keys, Doja Cat, and others. She also executive produced the Jake Paul documentary PRBLM Child for FITE TV.

=== Vie En Rose ===
In 2021, Rose founded the skincare company Vie En Rose and serves as its CEO. Rose developed the line after experiencing skin issues from years of working in the entertainment industry. The brand's products are vegan, cruelty-free, and manufactured in small batches in the United States.

Vie En Rose became the official skincare brand used on the set of HBO's The White Lotus, where it was used by the production's makeup department across multiple seasons of the series. The brand was featured in Vogue Arabia as one of the summer beauty essentials recommended by the show's makeup designer. In a 2025 interview with PopSugar, the show's makeup designer Rebecca Hickey discussed using Vie En Rose products on set. Actress Brittany O'Grady cited the brand in her skincare routine feature in Glamour.

Rose and the brand have been profiled in Wonderland, Dolce Magazine, the Chicago Tribune, Morning Honey, PhotoBook Magazine, Perception Magazine, and The GrowthOp. She was also featured in Patricia Bragg's book Revolutionary Beauty (2022).

== Personal life ==
Rose's mother is Jewish; she was raised with exposure to multiple spiritual traditions, including Buddhism. She has eight ethnicities, including Cherokee, Pacific Islander, and Eastern European heritage. She is an advocate for women's rights and works with animal welfare charities.

== Filmography ==
=== Film ===
Year	Title	Role
2007	Kush	Maren
2007	Lake Dead	Tanya Holt
2008	Garden Party	Groupie
2012	Yellow	Zadora
2014	Think Like a Man Too	Eileen
2015	Club Life	Sam
2017	The Last	Agent Sky
2017	Kidnap	Claire
2018	The Row	Captain Ellingham
2019	Flashout	Lleva
2019	Blood Pageant	Alex
2020	Hollow Point	Becky
2020	The Fight That Never Ends	Jessica Beck

=== Television ===
Year	Title	Role	Notes
2011	Entourage	Joy	Season 8, Episode 1: Home Sweet Home
2011	The Ropes	Amber	14 episodes
2011	Shredd	Mandy Johenson	Television Film
2013	Hello Ladies	Lexi	Season 1, Episode 5: "Pool Party"
2014	New Girl	Sarah	Season 3, Episode 15: "Exes"
2014	The Crazy Ones	Church Attendee	Season 1, Episode 15: "Dead and Improved"
2014	Legit	Mandy	Season 2, Episode 11: "Intervention"
2014	Two and a Half Men	Stacy	Season 12, Episode 1: "The Ol' Mexican Spinach"
2017	Can't Buy My Love	Calandre	Television film
2018	Unphiltered	Sabrina	Season 1, 3 Episodes
