= Keep Up (EP) =

2016 extended play by KSI

EP by KSI
- Released: 8 January 2016
- Recorded: 2015
- Genre: Hip hop
- Length: 16:50
- Label: Island
- Producers: DJ Turkish; Sway; Zagor; Show N Prove; Andrew Mutambira

KSI chronology
| Keep Up (2016) | Jump Around (2016) |

Singles from Keep Up
- 1. "Keep Up" Released: 13 November 2015

Keep Up is the debut extended play (EP) by British YouTube personality and rapper KSI. It was released on 8 January 2016 through Island Records. The EP features guest appearances from Jme, Tiggs da Author, Lunar C, Nick Brewer, Randolph, Youngs Teflon, Sway and Scrufizzer. The EP charted at number 13 on the UK Albums Chart.

== Singles ==
The EP's title track, "Keep Up", which features British grime MC Jme, was released on 13 November 2015, followed by a music video two days later which has 40 million views. The song charted at number 45 on the UK Singles Chart and number 78 on the ARIA Australia Top 100.

A music video for "Kilimanjaro" was released on 25 December 2015, and it has 19 million views.

A music video for "Smoke 'N' Mirrors", featuring singer Tiggs Da Author and English rappers Lunar C and Nick Brewer, was released on 10 January 2016, and it has 9 million views.

== Commercial performance ==
The EP debuted at number 13 on the UK Albums Chart. During this week, it topped the iTunes UK Downloads Chart. The EP spent a total of five weeks on the UK R&B Albums Chart, debuting at number 1. The EP also charted at number 19 on the Billboard US R&B/Hip-Hop Albums Chart, number 14 on the Billboard US Rap Albums Chart, number 63 on the Billboard Canadian Albums Chart and number 23 on the RMNZ New Zealand Albums Chart.

== Track listing ==
Credits adapted from Tidal.

| No. | Title | Writer(s) | Producer(s) | Length |
|---|---|---|---|---|
| 1. | "Keep Up" (featuring Jme) | Olajide Olatunji; Jamie Adenuga; Derek Safo; Ellis Taylor | Show N Prove; Sway | 3:01 |
| 2. | "Smoke 'N' Mirrors" (featuring Tiggs da Author, Lunar C, and Nick Brewer) | Olatunji; Safo; Tumai Salih; Adam Simon; Jake Brook; Nick Brewer; Andrew Mutambira | Sway; DJ Turkish | 3:19 |
| 3. | "Kilimanjaro" | Olatunji; Safo; Mutambira; Zag Erlat | Zagor; Sway; Mutambira | 3:49 |
| 4. | "Lambo Refuelled" (featuring Youngs Teflon, Sway, and Scrufizzer) | Olatunji; Safo; Salih; Jimmy Conway; Romani Lorenzo | DJ Turkish | 3:20 |
| 5. | "Encore" (featuring Randolph) | Olatunji; Andrew Shane; Erlat | Zagor | 3:21 |
| Total length: | | | | 16:50 |

== Personnel ==
Credits adapted from Tidal.

- KSI – vocals, songwriter
- Jme – vocals, songwriter (track 1)
- Show N Prove – producer, songwriter (track 1)
- Sway – producer (tracks 1–3), songwriter (tracks 1–4), engineer (tracks 1–5)
- DJ Turkish – engineer (tracks 1, 2, 4, 5), mixer (tracks 1–5), producer and songwriter (tracks 2, 4)
- Nicola Scordellis – additional vocals (track 1)
- Oscar Lo Brutto – studio personnel (tracks 1, 2, 4, 5), guitar (track 2)
- Andrew Mutambira – songwriter (tracks 2, 3), keyboard (track 2), producer (track 3)
- Tiggs Da Author – vocals, songwriter (track 2)
- Lunar C – vocals, songwriter (track 2)
- Nick Brewer – vocals, songwriter (track 2)
- Zagor – producer (tracks 3, 5), songwriter (tracks 3, 5)
- Youngs Teflon – vocals, songwriter (track 4)
- Scrufizzer – vocals, songwriter (track 4)
- Randolph – vocals, songwriter (track 5)

== Charts ==
| Chart (2016) | Peak position |
|---|---|
| Canadian Albums (Billboard) | 63 |
| New Zealand Albums (RMNZ) | 23 |
| Scottish Albums (Official Charts) | 15 |
| UK Albums (Official Charts) | 13 |
| UK R&B Albums (Official Charts) | 1 |
| US Top R&B/Hip-Hop Albums (Billboard) | 19 |
| US Top Rap Albums (Billboard) | 14 |
| US Heatseekers Albums (Billboard) | 3 |

== Release history ==
| Region | Date | Format(s) | Label | Ref. |
|---|---|---|---|---|
| Various | 8 January 2016 | CD; digital download; streaming | Island | |

== See also ==
- List of UK R&B Albums Chart number ones of 2016
