= Jump Around (EP) =

2016 extended play by KSI

EP by KSI
- Released: 28 October 2016
- Length: 18:33
- Label: Island; Universal
- Producer: Zagor; Sway; DJ Turkish; Charles Cook; MNDM; Faried Jhauw; Deeco; Levi Niha

KSI chronology
Keep Up (2016)	Jump Around (2016)	Space (2017)

Singles from Jump Around
- 1. "Goes Off" Released: 29 April 2016; 2. "Friends with Benefits" Released: 29 July 2016; 3. "Jump Around" Released: 16 September 2016

Jump Around is the second extended play (EP) by British YouTuber and recording artist KSI, released on 28 October 2016 by Island Records. The EP features guest appearances from Stefflon Don, Waka Flocka Flame, Mista Silva and Arjun and was preceded by three singles, titled "Goes Off", "Friends with Benefits" and "Jump Around", the second and third of which touched the UK music charts. Simultaneous with the EP's release, KSI embarked on a European concert tour to promote the EP.

== Promotion and release ==
Jump Around was released for digital download and streaming on 28 October 2016 by Island Records, a division of Universal Music Group.

=== Singles ===
"Goes Off", featuring British-Ghanaian artist Mista Silva, was released as the lead single from the EP on 29 April 2016. A music video, comprising footage of KSI's fanbase, was released one day later.

"Friends with Benefits", a collaboration with Dutch record production trio MNDM, was released as the second single from the EP on 29 July 2016. The song charted at number 69 on the UK Singles Chart and number 12 on the UK Hip Hop and R&B Singles Chart. The music video was released on 5 August 2016 and stars KSI alongside a no-strings-attached girlfriend in a series of silly vignettes which show the pair dressing up as various characters in reference to the song's lyrics. The video has received 50 million views.

"Jump Around", featuring American rapper Waka Flocka Flame, was released as the EP's third and final single on 16 September 2016. The song charted at number 73 on the UK Singles Downloads Chart. The music video was released on 3 October 2016 and stars KSI and Waka Flocka Flame among a crowd of people, taking to the streets to cause carnage, jumping around and dancing. The video has received 15 million views.

Although "Touch Down", featuring British rapper Stefflon Don, was not released as a single, the track appeared on the soundtrack of the film Baywatch (2017), which stars actors Dwayne Johnson and Zac Efron.

=== Tour ===
Jump Around European Tour
- Tour by KSI
- Associated album: Jump Around
- Start date: 26 October 2016
- End date: 8 November 2016
- Legs: 1
- No. of shows: 10

On 5 July 2016, it was announced that KSI would embark on a ten-date concert tour across Europe to promote the Jump Around EP.

List of tour dates with date, city, country, venue
Date	City	Country	Venue
26 October 2016	Paris	France	La Boule Noire
27 October 2016	Antwerp	Belgium	Kavka Club
28 October 2016	Amsterdam	Netherlands	Bitterzoet
30 October 2016	Berlin	Germany	Musik & Frieden
1 November 2016	Manchester	England	Manchester Academy
2 November 2016	Newcastle upon Tyne	England	O2 Academy Newcastle
4 November 2016	Glasgow	Scotland	O2 ABC Glasgow
5 November 2016	Liverpool	England	O2 Academy Liverpool
6 November 2016	Birmingham	England	O2 Institute
8 November 2016	London	England	The Garage

== Track listing ==
Jump Around track listing
No.	Title	Writer(s)	Producer(s)	Length
1.	"Touch Down" (featuring Stefflon Don)	Olajide Olatunji; Stephanie Allen; Tuna Erlat; Andrew Shane	Zagor	2:48
2.	"Jump Around" (featuring Waka Flocka Flame)	Olatunji; Juaquin Malphurs; Derek Safo; David Appell; Kal Mann; Lawrence Muggerud	Sway; DJ Turkish; Charles Cook	3:06
3.	"Friends with Benefits" (with MNDM)	Olatunji; Safo; Tumai Salih; Faried Jhauw; Charles Cook; Kris Coutinho	MNDM; Sway; DJ Turkish; Faried Jhauw; Charles Cook	2:46
4.	"Goes Off (Remix)" (featuring Mista Silva and CXCV)	Olatunji; Safo; Erlat	Sway; Zagor	3:22
5.	"OP"	Olatunji; Daniel Smith	Deeco	2:59
6.	"Sticks & Stones" (featuring Arjun)	Olatunji; Levi Niha; Cook; Safo	Levi Niha; Charles Cook	3:32
Total length:				18:33

== Credits and personnel ==
Credits adapted from Tidal.

- KSI – songwriting (all tracks), vocals (all tracks)
- DJ Turkish – mixing (all tracks), mastering (all tracks), production (2, 3), recording engineering (2), songwriting (3)
- Stefflon Don – songwriting (1), vocals (1)
- Zagor – production (1, 4), songwriting (1, 4)
- Randolph – songwriting (1)
- Sway – recording engineering (1, 2, 4), production (2–4), songwriting (2–4, 6), vocal arranging (2), additional vocals (4)
- Oscar Lo Brutto – editing (1)
- Waka Flocka Flame – songwriting (2), vocals (2)
- Charles Cook – production (2, 3, 6), songwriting (3, 6)
- David Appell – songwriting (2)
- Kal Mann – songwriting (2)
- Lawrence Muggerud – songwriting (2)
- MNDM – production (3)
- Faried Jhauw – production (3), songwriting (3), drums (3), recording engineering (3)
- Kris Coutinho – songwriting (3), drums (3), recording engineering (3)
- Rutti Cruise – recording engineering (3)
- Denise Kroes – additional vocals (3)
- Gia Re Lodge-O'Meally – additional vocals (3)
- Mista Silva – vocals (4)
- Andrew Mutambira – keyboard (4)
- Deeco – production (5), songwriting (5)
- Arjun – vocals (6)
- Levi Niha – production (6), songwriting (6)
- Rachel Calverley – cello (6)
- Hirka Katarina – viola (6)
- Rachel Jennings – violin (6)
- Rob Ross – violin (6)
- Dave Stanley – recording engineering (6)

== Charts ==
Chart performance for Jump Around
Chart (2016)	Peak position
UK Download (OCC)	60

== Release history ==
Release dates and formats for Jump Around
Region	Date	Format(s)	Label	Ref.
Various	28 October 2016	Digital download; streaming	Island; Universal	
