= Jump Around (KSI song) =

2016 single by KSI featuring Waka Flocka Flame

Single by KSI featuring Waka Flocka Flame

from the EP Jump Around
- Released: 16 September 2016
- Genre: Hip hop
- Length: 3:06
- Label: Island; Universal
- Songwriters: Olajide Olatunji; Juaquin Malphurs; Derek Safo; David Appell; Kal Mann; Lawrence Muggerud
- Producers: Sway; DJ Turkish; Charles Cook

KSI singles chronology
"Friends with Benefits" (2016)	"Jump Around" (2016)	"Creature" (2017)

Waka Flocka Flame singles chronology
"Scars On My Feet" (2016)	"Jump Around" (2016)	"Was My Dawg" (2017)

Music video
- "Jump Around" on YouTube

"Jump Around" is a song by British YouTuber and recording artist KSI featuring American rapper Waka Flocka Flame. It was released on 16 September 2016 by Island Records as the third and final single from KSI's second extended play (EP) of the same name (2016). The song is a remake of "Jump Around" (1992) by House of Pain.

"Jump Around" was met with mixed reviews from music critics, although some praised the song's high-octane energy. The song debuted at number 73 on the UK Singles Downloads Chart. The song's music video was released on 3 October 2016 and stars KSI and Waka Flocka Flame among a crowd of people, taking to the streets to cause carnage and jumping around and dancing.

== Writing and production ==
I wasn’t in [England] when it came about. I was in Italy when it happened. Waka’s manager knows DJ Turkish quite well so they came through to the Dcypha Studio while they were in England. Sway and DJ Turkish played Waka a few of my new songs and he enjoyed them all until he heard "Jump Around". He was going crazy [over] it and asked if anyone was on the third verse. Once Sway said it was vacant, Waka immediately thought of lyrics and did a verse on the same day. I was so gassed when I heard the news.

— KSI speaking on Waka Flocka Flame's involvement in the song

"Jump Around"
A 27-second sample of KSI's remake of the song "Jump Around" by American hip hop group House of Pain.

In early 2016, KSI recorded a remake of the song "Jump Around" (1992) by American hip hop group House of Pain. It was not intended to be released as a single or have a featured artist. KSI explained, "I didn’t want to release it as a single. I wanted to just quietly release it on [the] EP."

During a recording studio session in England with Sway and DJ Turkish, the producer's of "Jump Around", American rapper Waka Flocka Flame was played some of KSI's unreleased songs including "Jump Around". Waka Flocka Flame liked the song and asked if he could feature on it, recording his verse on the same day. The addition of Waka Flocka Flame to "Jump Around" resulted in the decision to release it as a single.

Speaking about his remake of "Jump Around", KSI affirmed, "I feel like I’ve done well with my take on it." He continued, "The song just makes you wanna go crazy, especially the chorus.”

== Release and promotion ==
"Jump Around" was first teased on 5 August 2016 when a 15 seconds-long teaser of the song and its music video appeared at the end of the music video for KSI's previous single "Friends with Benefits" (2016). The cover art and release date for "Jump Around" were also shared on the same day, with the song was made available to pre-order on digital download services and pre-save on streaming services. "Jump Around" was eventually released for digital download and streaming on 16 September 2016 by Island Records, a division of Universal Music Group.

== Critical reception ==
KSI's remake of "Jump Around" was met with mixed reviews from music critics. Andrew Trendell of NME called it a "feel-good anthem" and "a high octane take on the House Of Pain classic". Liam Luangrathrajasombat of Playback Society praised KSI and Waka Flocka Flame for "[bringing] a fresh 2016 flow to an aged classic" and acclaimed that the song has "a banging beat that would light up the club."

On the other hand, in their review of "Jump Around", the staff of String Buzz claimed, "There is no innovation, variation or imagination with this track. It is a beat-for-beat remake with some shoddy lyrics." They said that "the delivery [and] vocal performance [are] a saving grace" because the lyrics are "belted out with enthusiasm", but they found that "the tone of [KSI's] voice [does] become grating by the final chorus". Nonetheless, they concluded that "decent production keeps this song from being a car crash". They said, "The beat sounds thick and wholesome, the instrumentation sounds well mixed and the vocals fit in to the overall sound very well."

== Music video ==
The music video for "Jump Around" was filmed in the United States in the summer of 2016. A trailer was released on 19 September 2016. The music video was eventually released to KSI's Vevo channel on YouTube on 3 October 2016 and has received 15 million views. In the music video, KSI wreaks havoc in a convenience store, before taking to the streets to cause carnage. KSI then heads down to Waka Flocka Flame's court, where they are accompanied by a large crowd of people, including police officers, jumping around and dancing. When asked about his favourite element of the music video shoot, KSI responded, "Just the energy. Literally, it was mad. I was out of breath after every shot.

== Use in other media ==
KSI's remake of "Jump Around" was used in the trailer for the animated film Playmobil: The Movie (2019). "Jump Around" was also used in the trailer for the animated film DC League of Super-Pets (2022), which stars actors Dwayne Johnson and Kevin Hart.

== Credits and personnel ==
Credits adapted from Tidal.

- KSI – songwriting, vocals
- Waka Flocka Flame – songwriting, vocals
- Sway – production, songwriting, recording engineering, vocal arranging
- DJ Turkish – production, mixing, mastering, recording engineering
- Charles Cook – production
- Dave Appell – songwriting
- Kal Mann – songwriting
- DJ Muggs – songwriting

== Charts ==
Chart performance for "Jump Around"
Chart (2016)	Peak position
Scottish Singles Sales (Official Charts)	77
UK Singles Downloads (Official Charts)	73

== Release history ==
Release dates and formats for "Jump Around"
Region	Date	Format(s)	Label(s)	Ref.
Various	16 September 2016	Digital download; streaming	Island; Universal	
