= KSI vs Joe Fournier =

2023 crossover boxing match

MF & DAZN: X Series 007
- Date: 13 May 2023
- Venue: Wembley Arena, London, England
- Title on the line: MFB cruiserweight championship

Tale of the tape
Boxer	KSI	Joe Fournier
Nickname	"The Nightmare"	"The Billionaire"
Hometown	Watford, England	Hounslow, England
Pre-fight record	4–0 (3 KOs) (Note: On BoxRec, KSI's professional record is 1–0 and his MF-professional record is 3–0 (3 KOs).)	9–0–0–1 (9 KOs)
Age	29 years, 10 months	40 years, 3 months
Height	5 ft 11 in (1.80 m)	6 ft 1 in (1.85 m)
Weight	177.6 lb (81 kg)	179 1/2 lb (81 kg)
Style	Orthodox	Orthodox
Recognition	MFB cruiserweight champion	Former WBA International light-heavyweight champion

Result
- Originally a win via 2nd-round KO by KSI but overturned to a no contest due to accidental elbow strike

MF & DAZN: X Series 007 featured KSI vs Joe Fournier, which was a cruiserweight MF–professional crossover boxing match contested between English Internet personality KSI and English businessman and professional boxer Joe Fournier for the MFB cruiserweight title. The bout took place at Wembley Arena, in London, England on 13 May 2023. The fight reportedly sold 300,000 PPV buys.

== Background ==
On 4 October 2022, Joe Fournier posted a video on his Instagram page calling out Jake Paul, Logan Paul and KSI for not fighting 'real boxers'. KSI opted choose MMA fighter Dillon Danis as his opponent for MF & DAZN: X Series 004. Fournier however, was scheduled to face Tony Christodoulou on the undercard with Fournier acting as the replacement fighter in the case that Danis were to withdraw. Unfortunately, Christodoulou failed an MRI scan thus canceling Fournier's bout on 14 January. On 4 January, Danis withdrew from the bout and was replaced by YouTuber FaZe Temperrr instead of Fournier due to Temperrr being a southpaw. After KSI defeated Temperrrr, he and Fournier shared a stare down after the pair verbally agreed to face each other in May.

On 22 March, it was announced that KSI would face Fournier on 13 May at Wembley Arena in London, England. KSI defeated Fournier via KO in the 2nd round but was later overturned as a no contest after review shows KSI striking Fournier with his elbow.

== Controversies ==
=== KSI–Fournier elbow knockout ===
During the second round, KSI threw a right hook that missed, causing his elbow to strike Fournier, knocking him unconscious. After the bout concluded, Fournier stated that he would appeal the decision. On 15 May, the Professional Boxing Association (PBA) called for both fighters to make their cases and will be conducting a review with a decision to be made by 19 May at the latest. On 19 May, the PBA officially overturned the victory and was ruled as a no contest.

=== ViruZz illegal substance ===
On 4 August, it was announced that after an investigation conducted by the PBA, Spanish YouTuber ViruZz had tested positive for illegal substance use. On the 7th of August, the PBA announced that ViruZz has received a two year suspension and will be fined £8,000. The bout was overturned and was ruled as a no contest.

== Fight card ==
Weight class		vs		Method	Round	Time	Notes
Main Card (PPV)
Cruiserweight	KSI (c)	vs.	Joe Fournier	NC	2/6	1:26	^{Note 1}
Light heavyweight	Deji Olatunji	def.	Swarmz	UD	4
Cruiserweight	Anthony Taylor	def.	Salt Papi	UD	3
Middleweight	Paigey Cakey	def.	Tennessee Thresh	UD	3
Cruiserweight	ViruZz	vs.	DK Money	NC	2/4	2:59
Middleweight	Little Bellsy	def.	Lil Kymchii	UD	4
Happy Punch Preliminary Card
Super-heavyweight	WingsOfRedemption	def.	Boogie2988	TKO	2/3	0:29	^{Note 2}^{,} ^{3}
Welterweight	Unbaer	def.	Corn	SD	3		^{Note 4}
Heavyweight	Luis Nestor	def.	Callum King	UD	3		^{Note 5}
Light heavyweight	Halal Ham	def.	Zuckles	UD	3		^{Note 6}^{,} ^{7}

^Note 1 For MFB cruiserweight title
^Note 2 1 minute rounds
^Note 3 Exhibition bout
^Note 4 Exhibition bout
^Note 5 Exhibition bout
^Note 6 Exhibition bout
^Note 7 Ham's identity was revealed on the night and was marketed as a mystery opponent

== Broadcasting ==
Country/Region	Broadcasters			
Country/Region	Free	Cable TV	PPV	Stream
United Kingdom (Host)	YouTube (Preliminary Card)	—N/a	DAZN PPV	
United States	YouTube (Preliminary Card)	—N/a	DAZN PPV	
Canada	YouTube (Preliminary Card)	—N/a	DAZN PPV	
Ireland	YouTube (Preliminary Card)	—N/a	DAZN PPV	
Australia	YouTube (Preliminary Card)	—N/a	DAZN PPV	
New Zealand	YouTube (Preliminary Card)	—N/a	DAZN PPV	
Netherlands	YouTube (Preliminary Card)	—N/a	DAZN PPV	
Mexico	YouTube (Preliminary Card)	—N/a	DAZN PPV	
Brazil	YouTube (Preliminary Card)	—N/a	DAZN PPV	
France	YouTube (Preliminary Card)	—N/a	DAZN PPV	
Sweden	YouTube (Preliminary Card)	—N/a	DAZN PPV	
Norway	YouTube (Preliminary Card)	—N/a	DAZN PPV	
Finland	YouTube (Preliminary Card)	—N/a	DAZN PPV	
Denmark	YouTube (Preliminary Card)	—N/a	DAZN PPV	
Worldwide	YouTube (Preliminary Card)	—N/a	—N/a	DAZN

== See also ==
- 2023 in Misfits Boxing
