= Paigey Cakey =

British MC, singer and actress (born 1993)

- Born: Paige Meade; January 18, 1993 (age 33); Hackney, London, England
- Genres: Hip hop, trap, R&B, grime
- Occupations: MC, singer, rapper, actress
- Years active: 2011–present
- Labels: Paigey Cakey Music/Urban Development, Alwayz Recording

Paige Meade (born January 18, 1993) better known by her stage name Paigey Cakey, is an English MC, singer, rapper and actress, from Hackney, London.

She released her first mixtape in 2014 entitled The First Paige. Her third mixtape, The Right Paige, featured Yungen, Young Spray, Sneakbo, Stormzy, Chip, Snap Capone, Colours and Dubz. She released an EP entitled Red in early 2016 and Red Velvet, a mixtape which she released as a Christmas gift to her fans on 25 December 2016.

== Career ==
=== Acting ===
In 2011, Cakey played the character Dimples in the award-winning film Attack the Block. Between 2012 and 2013, she played the role of Jade Fleming in the BBC One school-based drama series Waterloo Road, and performed a freestyle-rap for the series. The rap was focused on the decision whether to keep her baby.

=== Music ===
In 2012, Cakey released her first mixtape, The First Paige. On 30 October 2014, Cakey released her third mixtape, The Right Paige, which featured vocals from Sneakbo, Stormzy and Chip.

=== Boxing ===
Cakey went up against Tennessee Thresh in a boxing match on the undercard of MF & DAZN: X Series 007 on 13 May 2023 at Wembley Arena in London, England.

== Personal life ==
Paige Meade was born in Hackney, London. In an interview with the MOBOs she revealed that "Cakey" was a childhood nickname, which referred to her perceived wealth. Cakey is bisexual.

== Filmography ==
=== Film ===
Year	Title	Role	Notes	Ref.
2011	Attack the Block	Dimples	Main role	

=== Television ===
Year(s)	Title	Role	Notes	Ref.
2012–2013	Waterloo Road	Jade	Main role	
2014	The Secrets	Kelly	Episode: "The Visitor"	
2018	Pixies	Kelly	Episode: "Pilot"	
2019	Degree	Herself	Voice; miniseries	

== Discography ==
=== Studio albums ===
List of studio albums
Title	Details
Red Velvet	Released: 26 December 2016; Label: Self-release; Formats: Digital download, streaming
Flavours	Released: 1 February 2019; Label: Self-release; Formats: Digital download, streaming
Killy	Released: 28 December 2022; Label: Self-release; Formats: Digital download, streaming

=== Mixtapes ===
List of studio albums
Title	Details
The Right Paige	Released: 30 October 2014; Label: Self-release; Formats: Digital download, CD

=== Extended plays ===
List of studio albums
Title	Details
The Next Paige	Released: 27 January 2014; Label: Self-release; Formats: Digital download, streaming
Red EP	Released: 28 March 2016; Label: Self-release; Formats: Digital download, streaming

=== Singles ===
Title	Year	Album
"NaNa" (featuring Geko)	2015	Red
"Boogie"	2016	Red Velvet
"Pattern"	2016	Red Velvet
"Let's Get Em Drunk"	2016	Non-album single
"Boyfriend"	2016	Red Velvet
"Problem"	2016	Non-album single
"Money"	2017	Non-album single
"Exchange" (featuring Big Tobz)	2017	Non-album single
"Call Your Friends"	2017	Non-album single
"Pull Up" (featuring Konshens)	2017	Non-album single
"Calling" (with K More)	2017	Non-album single
"Notice Me"	2018	Non-album single
"Pull-Up & Skrr"	2018	Non-album single
"Loving" (featuring Geko)	2018	Non-album single
"Drip Ice"	2018	Non-album single
"One For You" (featuring Mulla Stackz)	2018	Flavours
"Say Go"	2019	Flavours
"Lotto Bars"	2019	Non-album single
"An I Oop" (featuring Daina)	2019	Non-album single
"Impossible" (with FYI)	2019	Non-album single
"Stylish" (featuring Zeeko)	2020	Non-album single
"Changes"	2020	Non-album single
"Fendiii"	2020	Non-album single
"Ride Or Die" (with Geko)	2020	Non-album single
"Attention"	2021	Non-album single
"Lovers & Friends"	2021	Non-album single
"Cheeky"	2021	Non-album single
"Myspace"	2022	Non-album single
"Trust Me"	2022	Non-album single
"Tennessee"	2023	Non-album single

== MF–Professional boxing record ==
1 fight	1 win	0 losses
By decision	1	0

No.	Result	Record	Opponent	Type	Round, time	Date	Location	Notes
1	Win	1–0	Tennessee Thresh	UD	3	13 May 2023	Wembley Arena, London, England	
