= Keep Up (KSI song) =

2015 single by KSI featuring Jme

Single by KSI featuring Jme

from the EP Keep Up
- Released: 13 November 2015
- Recorded: 2015
- Genre: British hip hop; grime
- Length: 3:01
- Label: Island
- Songwriter(s): Olajide Olatunji; Jamie Adenuga; Derek Safo; Ellis Taylor
- Producer(s): Sway; Show N Prove

KSI singles chronology
"Lamborghini" (2015)	"Keep Up" (2015)	"Goes Off" (2016)

Jme singles chronology
"Man Don't Care" (2015)	"Keep Up" (2015)	"House & Pop" (2016)

Music video
- "Keep Up" on YouTube

"Keep Up" is a song by British YouTuber and rapper KSI featuring fellow British rapper Jme from the former's debut extended play (EP), of the same name (2016). It was produced by Sway and Show N Prove. The song was released for digital download and streaming on 13 November 2015 by Island Records as the lead single from the EP. The song charted at number 45 in the United Kingdom and also reached the singles charts of Ireland and Australia. An accompanying music video was released on 15 November 2015.

== Commercial performance ==
The song entered the UK Singles Chart at number 45. It dropped to number 68 and number 91 over the following two weeks, before dropping out of the top 100. In January 2016, the song re-entered the UK Singles Chart at number 69 following the release of the Keep Up EP. The song spent a total of twelve weeks on the UK R&B Singles Chart, peaking at number 7. The song also charted at number 78 on the ARIA Australia Top 100 Singles Chart after the release of the Keep Up EP, making it KSI's first song to chart in Australia.

== Music video ==
The music video, directed by Jack Delaney, was filmed in London in September 2015, as documented in KSI's YouTube vlog titled "New Music Video!", and was uploaded to KSI's YouTube channel on 15 November 2015. It has 40 million views.

== Credits and personnel ==
Credits adapted from Tidal.

- KSI – vocals, songwriter
- Jme – vocals, songwriter
- Sway – producer, songwriter, engineer
- Show N Prove – producer, songwriter
- DJ Turkish – engineer, mixer
- Oscar Lo Brutto – studio personnel
- Nicola Scordellis – additional vocals

== Charts ==
Chart (2015–16)	Peak position
Australia (ARIA)	78
Ireland (IRMA)	90
Scotland (OCC)	40
UK Singles (OCC)	45
UK Hip Hop/R&B (OCC)	7

== Release history ==
Region	Date	Format	Label	Ref.
Various	13 November 2015	Digital download; streaming	Island	
