= Joe Fournier =

British-Monégasque businessman and professional boxer (born 1983)

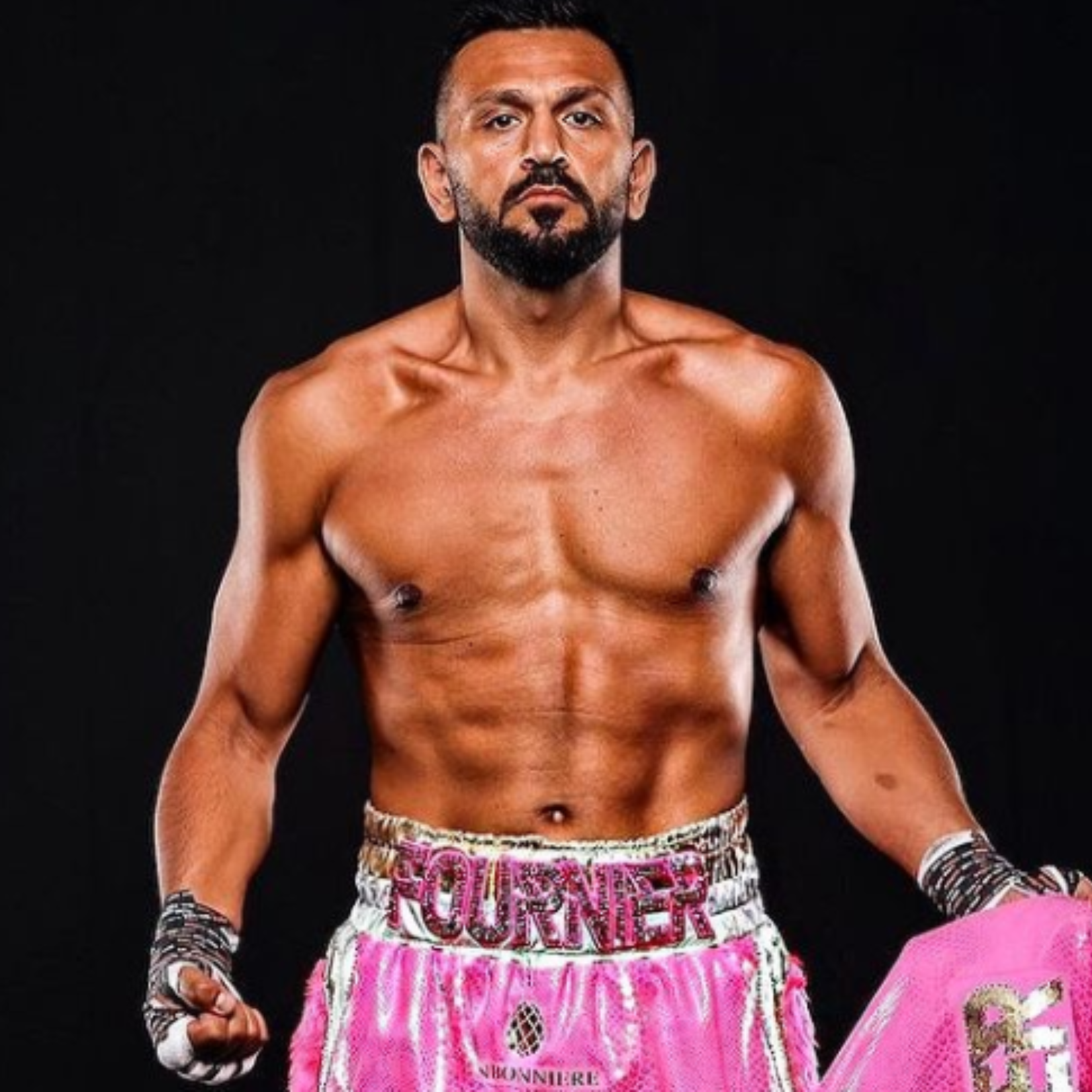
- Born: Jocelyn Faisal Jules Fournier; 23 January 1983 (age 43); Hounslow, London, England
- Occupation: Businessman Professional boxer
- Years active: 2012–present
- Boxing career
- Nicknames: The Badass Billionaire; The Billionaire
- Height: 6 ft (183 cm)
- Weight: Light heavyweight
- Reach: 78 in (198 cm)
- Stance: Orthodox

Boxing record
- Total fights: 11
- Wins: 9
- Win by KO: 9
- No contests: 2

Joe Fournier (born 23 January 1983) is a British businessman and professional boxer who competed from 2015 to 2023. He started a fitness business, before selling it and then subsequently moved into the nightclub industry.

He had an exhibition fight with David Haye on 11 September 2021 and lost via unanimous decision. He fought KSI on 13 May 2023, in what was controversially ruled a second round KO. This decision was later overturned to a no contest after a review showed KSI accidentally striking Fournier with his elbow.

== Early life ==
It is reported by some outlets that Fournier was born in Monaco, before moving to London, England. Although The Times says he was born in London and moved to Monaco. His father was a pilot from Monaco, and his mother a housewife. Fournier attended Lycée Français Charles De Gaulle de Londres in Kensington then American Community School. After his parents' divorce Fournier moved to Hounslow with his mother and attended Ashton House primary and then Isleworth & Syon School. When living with his mother Fournier "went from having a chauffeur driven car to school every day, to taking the bus."

Fournier studied human biology and sports science at St Mary's University.

== Business ==
After being forced to retire from boxing due to a scaphoid injury, Fournier set up his own gym where he acted as "a trainer, PR, and cleaner, all-in-one."

Fournier grew the gym business and gained recognition as a personal trainer with a roster of celebrity clients. Fournier wrote Red Carpet Workout in 2008 of which he said: "Growing up, I was street-smart but got a D in English, so publishing a book made my mum and my family proud. I get royalties from it and got quite a bit up front too, about £30,000 which I split with my agent and the ghostwriter."

Fournier sold his fitness business and studios to a FTSE 100 company in 2012. He made his money by owning the freehold to his gyms having moved into real estate almost by mistake. "It wasn't the gyms that brought the fortune, it was that I held the Freehold leases to the properties," he explains. "I ended up selling all 14 locations to a FTSE 100 company and that was my first real kill."

Fournier invested in nightclubs, opening and owning Whisky Mist, The Rose Club, Bonbonniere London and Streaky Gin. Most recently he opened Bonbonniere Mikonos. Fournier invested in nightclubs stating, "It's really difficult to get people to do lunges and eat salad, but it was easy getting people to get pissed, drink gin and tonic, party, and eat pizza."

== Boxing career ==
=== Professional career ===
In 2015 Fournier took up boxing professionally. He is signed to Hayemaker Promotions. His record currently stands as 9 wins 1 No Contest with all wins by TKO. He made his debut in the light heavyweight division against Jorge Burgos in the Dominican Republic. He defeated Manuel Regalado and Pedro Sencion before appearing on the undercard of David Haye-Arnold Gjergjaj on 21 May 2016 at the O2 Arena, London. Fournier defeated Bela Juhasz inside two rounds.

==== Fournier vs Stini ====
Fournier then fought in Belgium beating Mustapha Stini. Fournier, had "no real problems" defeating Stini.

Elliot Worsell wrote on website boxingnewsonline.net that "What does appear on Fournier's Boxrec record, however, are details of a failed drug test (for sibutramine), for which he was banned by NADO until December 2020, following a bout with Mustapha Stini in June 2016".

==== Fournier vs Mejia ====
On 18 December 2017, Fournier fought Wilmer Mejia at Casa de los Clubes in Santo Domingo, Dominican Republic in a then professional bout and won via knockout in the 8th round. Fournier was awarded the vacant WBA international light heavyweight belt by Agent 324. Fournier moved up to 11th in the rankings thanks to this victory against his first southpaw opponent. Fournier used the victory to reiterate his desire to fight fellow countryman Callum Smith saying, "I will buy him a jet plane or a house if he fights me!"

==== Fournier vs. Reykon ====
On 17 April 2021, Fournier fought Colombian singer Reykon. Fournier defeated Reykon via corner retirement after the 1st round. Fournier came under fire for making a derogatory comment about Colombians and kidnappings during the first press conference.

==== Fournier vs KSI ====
On 22 March 2023, it was announced that Fournier would face YouTuber KSI as the headline for MF & DAZN: X Series 007 on 13 May at Wembley Arena in London, England for the MF cruiserweight title. KSI defeated Fournier via knockout in the 2nd round, however controversy arose after replays showed KSI landing an illegal elbow strike during the finishing sequence. On 15 May, Fournier appealed the decision and the Professional Boxing Association called for both fighters to make their cases, they also announced a decision on the issue would be made by 19 May at the latest. On 19 May, the PBA officially ruled the bout as a no contest.

=== Exhibition bouts ===
==== Fournier vs. Haye ====
On 11 September 2021, Fournier suffered his first loss against his friend and former two-division world champion David Haye in an exhibition bout via unanimous decision on the undercard of Evander Holyfield vs. Vitor Belfort.

== Personal life ==
Fournier went to Iselworth and Syon school with Sir Mo Farah and classes him as one of his closest friends.

Joe Fournier also has revealed his interest of running for the mayor of Hounslow.

== Philanthropy ==
Fournier supports Caudwell Children and ran the Joe Fournier Foundation until 2021. The latter paid for coaching and after-school clubs in Hounslow.

== Boxing record ==
=== Professional ===
10 fights	9 wins	0 losses
By knockout	9	0
No contests	1	

No.	Result	Record	Opponent	Type	Round, time	Date	Location	Notes
10	Win	9–0 (1)	Reykon	RTD	2 (6), 3:00	17 Apr 2021	Mercedes-Benz Stadium, Atlanta, Georgia, U.S.	
9	Win	8–0 (1)	Antonio Sanchez	TKO	5 (6), 1:43	16 Dec 2016	Cancha Palma de Alma Rosa, Santo Domingo, Dominican Republic	
8	Win	7–0 (1)	Francisco Suero	TKO	1 (6), 2:03	18 Aug 2016	Polideportivo Ambiorix Estevez, Dajabón, Dominican Republic	
7	Win	6–0 (1)	Johnny Ascencio	TKO	1 (6), 2:31	1 Aug 2016	Club Luz y Progreso, Santiago de los Caballeros, Dominican Republic	
6	Win	5–0 (1)	Jose Santos	TKO	3 (6), 2:03	15 July 2016	Club Maquiteria, Santo Domingo, Dominican Republic	
5	NC	4–0 (1)	Mustapha Stini	NC	2 (8), 1:02	25 Jun 2016	Ninove, Belgium	Overturned after Fournier tested positive for banned substances.
4	Win	4–0	Bela Juhasz	TKO	2 (4), 1:43	21 May 2016	The O2 Arena, London, England	
3	Win	3–0	Pedro Sencion	TKO	2 (4), 1:05	20 Feb 2016	Coliseo Pedro Julio Nolasco, La Romana, Dominican Republic	
2	Win	2–0	Manuel Ragalado	TKO	1 (4), 0:38	20 Nov 2015	Casa de los Clubes, Santo Domingo, Dominican Republic	
1	Win	1–0	Jorge Burgos	TKO	1 (4), 1:30	22 Oct 2015	Casa de los Clubes, Santo Domingo, Dominican Republic	

=== MF-Professional ===
1 fight	0 wins	0 losses
No contests	1	

No.	Result	Record	Opponent	Type	Round, time	Date	Location	Notes
1	NC	0–0 (1)	KSI	NC	2 (6), 1:26	13 May 2023	Wembley Arena, London, England	For MFB cruiserweight title Originally a KO win for KSI; overturned due to an accidental elbow strike.

=== Exhibition ===
1 fight	0 wins	1 loss
By decision	0	1

No.	Result	Record	Opponent	Type	Round, time	Date	Location	Notes
1	Loss	0–1	David Haye	UD	8	11 Sep 2021	Seminole Hard Rock Hotel & Casino, Hollywood, Florida, US	

== Pay-per-view bouts ==
United Kingdom
No.	Date	Fight	Billing	Network	Buys	Revenue	Source(s)
1	13 May 2023	KSI vs Fournier	—N/a	DAZN	300,000	£6,000,000	
Total					300,000	£6,000,000	

== Awards and nominations ==
Year	Award	Category	Recipient(s)	Result	Ref.
2024	Misfits Boxing Awards	Best Ringwalk	Himself	Pending	
