= Jake Paul vs. Ben Askren =

2021 professional crossover boxing match

- Date: April 17, 2021
- Venue: Mercedes-Benz Stadium, Atlanta, Georgia, U.S.

Tale of the tape
Boxer	(United States) Jake Paul	(United States) Ben Askren
Nickname	The Problem Child	Funky
Hometown	Cleveland, Ohio, U.S.	Cedar Rapids, Iowa, U.S.
Pre-fight record	2–0 (2 KOs)	0–0 (Boxing); 19–2–1 (6 KOs) (MMA)
Age	24 years, 3 months	36 years, 8 months
Height	6 ft 1 in (1.85 m)	5 ft 10 in (1.78 m)
Weight	191 1/2 lb (87 kg)	191 lb (87 kg)
Style	Orthodox	Orthodox
Recognition		Former Bellator welterweight champion Former ONE Championship welterweight champion

Result
- Paul wins via 1st-round TKO

Jake Paul vs. Ben Askren was a cruiserweight professional crossover boxing match contested between American YouTuber Jake Paul and American former mixed martial artist Ben Askren. The bout took place at the Mercedes-Benz Stadium in Atlanta, Georgia on April 17, 2021. Paul won the bout via TKO in one minute and 59 seconds of the first round. The fight sold 500,000 PPV buys.

== Background ==
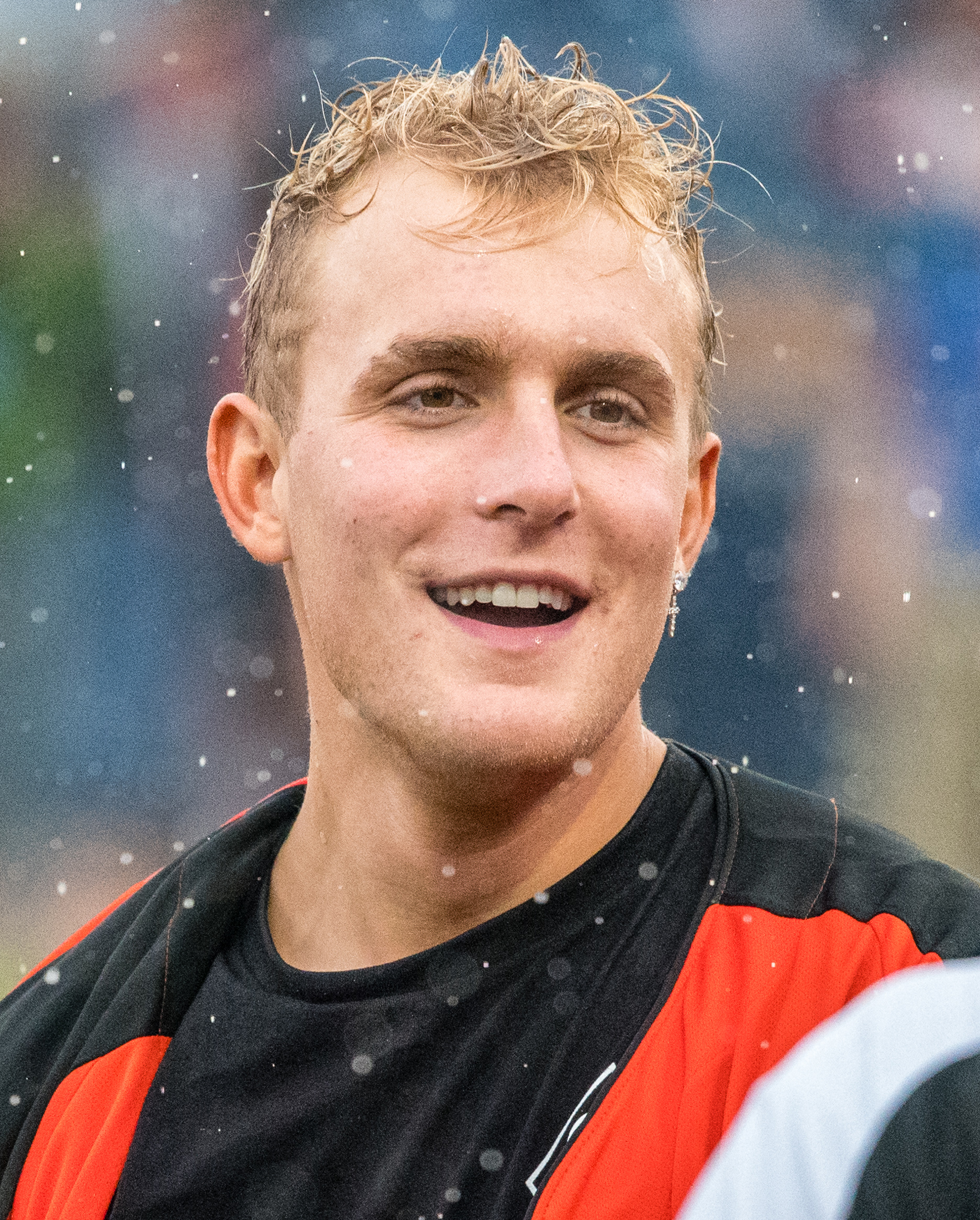
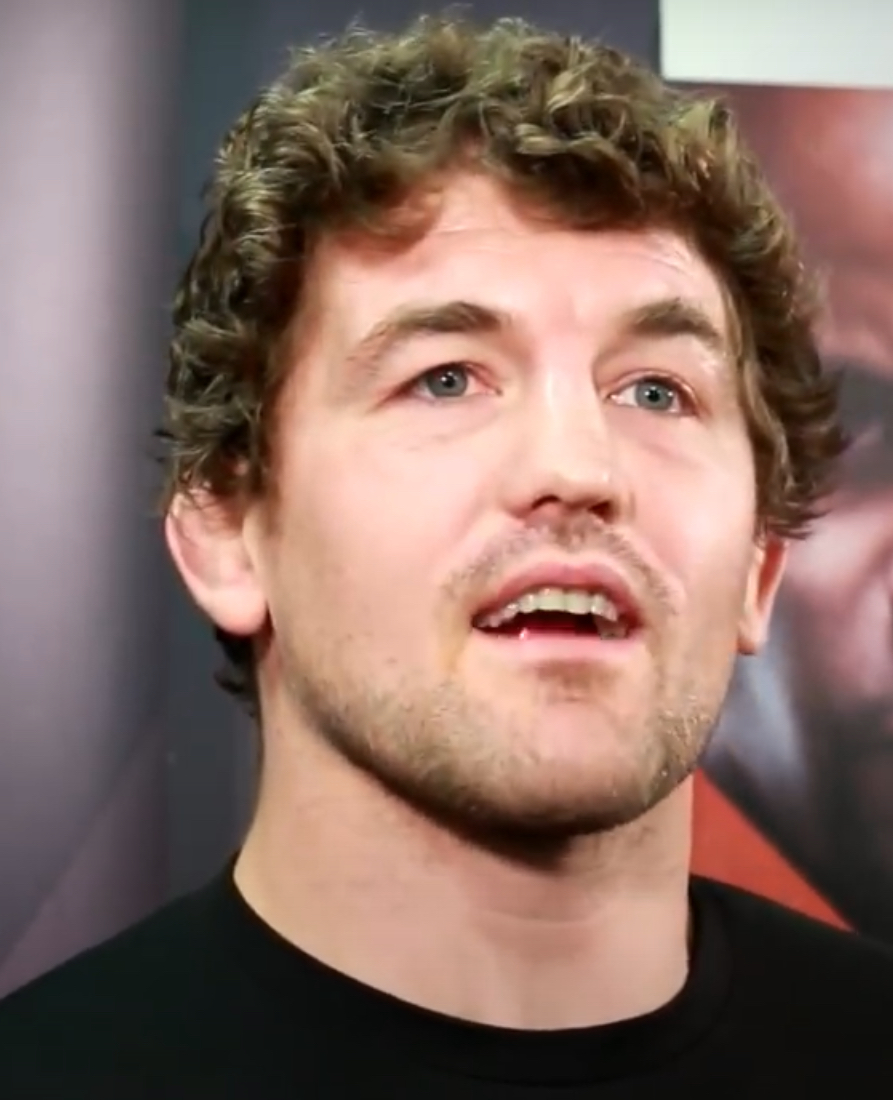
Jake Paul (left) and Ben Askren (right).

The fight was announced on December 22, 2020, along with tentative plans to hold the match in Los Angeles. It was later announced that the venue had been changed to the Mercedes-Benz Stadium in Atlanta. The event was held with limited attendance, consisting of 100 spectators who won tickets via promotions on the Triller app. The fight was executive produced by actress and producer Malea Rose who also served as the creative director for the events overall vision.

On Mike Tyson's podcast, UFC President Dana White stated that he would be willing to bet $1 million on Jake Paul losing to Askren. Jake Paul responded to White's statement with excitement, and offered to double the wager. Rapper Snoop Dogg also responded to Dana White's declaration, offering to bet $2 million on Jake Paul winning the fight.

== Fight card ==
Weight Class		vs.		Method	Round	Time	Notes
Cruiserweight	Jake Paul	def.	Ben Askren	TKO	1/8	1:59	^{Note 1}
Light welterweight	Regis Prograis	def.	Ivan Redkach	TKO	6/10	1:21	^{Note 2}
Heavyweight	Steve Cunningham	def.	Frank Mir	UD	6/6		^{Note 3}
Light heavyweight	Joe Fournier	def.	Reykon	RTD	2/6	3:00	^{Note 4}
Super middleweight	Junior Younan	def.	Jeyson Minda	UD	8/8
Welterweight	Quinton Randall	def.	William Jackson	UD	8/8

^Note 1 Askren's professional debut
^Note 2 Originally ruled a technical decision win for Prograis from a low-blow, it was ruled a TKO after confirming no foul.
^Note 3 Mir's professional debut
^Note 4 Reykon's professional debut

== Broadcasting ==
The card was the inaugural event of Triller Fight Club, a new series of boxing events promoted by the video sharing app Triller (who had previously partnered with Legends Only League for 2020's Mike Tyson vs. Roy Jones Jr.) and rapper Snoop Dogg. The pay-per-view featured a similar mix of sports- and entertainment-oriented content to the Tyson vs. Jones PPV, including musical performances by The Black Keys, Diplo, Doja Cat, Justin Bieber, Major Lazer, Saweetie, and Mt. Westmore—a supergroup of Snoop Dogg, Ice Cube, Too $hort and E-40. Triller also streamed PRBLM CHILD, a documentary series hyping the fight.

The PPV was distributed via cable and satellite television providers in the United States and Canada, and also via the combat sports streaming service Fite TV (which was acquired by Triller during the direct lead-up to the fight).

== Fight details ==
The bout was criticized by many pundits and combat sports athletes alike, as the retired MMA fighter Askren was known for succeeding in the octagon due to his grappling, and was widely regarded as one of the worst strikers in the sport. Aside from that, Askren, who had retired from the sport of MMA and was 36 at the time, had had a hip replacement in the months prior to signing the contract of the bout.

In a contest between the younger and taller Paul and the more experienced athlete Askren, Paul worked his jab to keep Askren outside. Brent Brookhouse for CBS said Askren "looked stiff and robotic" in the early portion of the fight. Paul landed with an overhand right halfway through the first round, with Askren falling straight legged to the canvas. Although Askren rose to his feet soon after, the referee called off the fight, with Askren showing some unsteadiness. After the fight, Askren commented that the stoppage was called too early, but otherwise seemed to be happy with the outcome.'

== Pay-per-view numbers ==
In 2022, Jake Paul would reveal the fight sold 500,000 PPV buys.

== Fight purses ==
According to the Georgia Athletic and Entertainment Commission, Paul earned an official purse of $690,000 and Askren a $500,000 purse. These figures don't include any additional bonuses or PPV profits.

Guaranteed base purses

- Jake Paul ($690,000) vs. Ben Askren ($500,000)
- Ivan Redkach ($250,000) vs. Regis Prograis ($850,000)
- Frank Mir ($350,000) vs. Steve Cunningham ($150,000)
- Andres "Reykon" Londono ($80,000) vs. Joe Fournier ($220,000)
- Jeyson Minda ($8,000) vs. Junior Younan ($25,000)
- William Jackson ($8,000) vs. Quinton Randall ($15,000)
