= KSI =

English influencer, musician, and former boxer (born 1993)

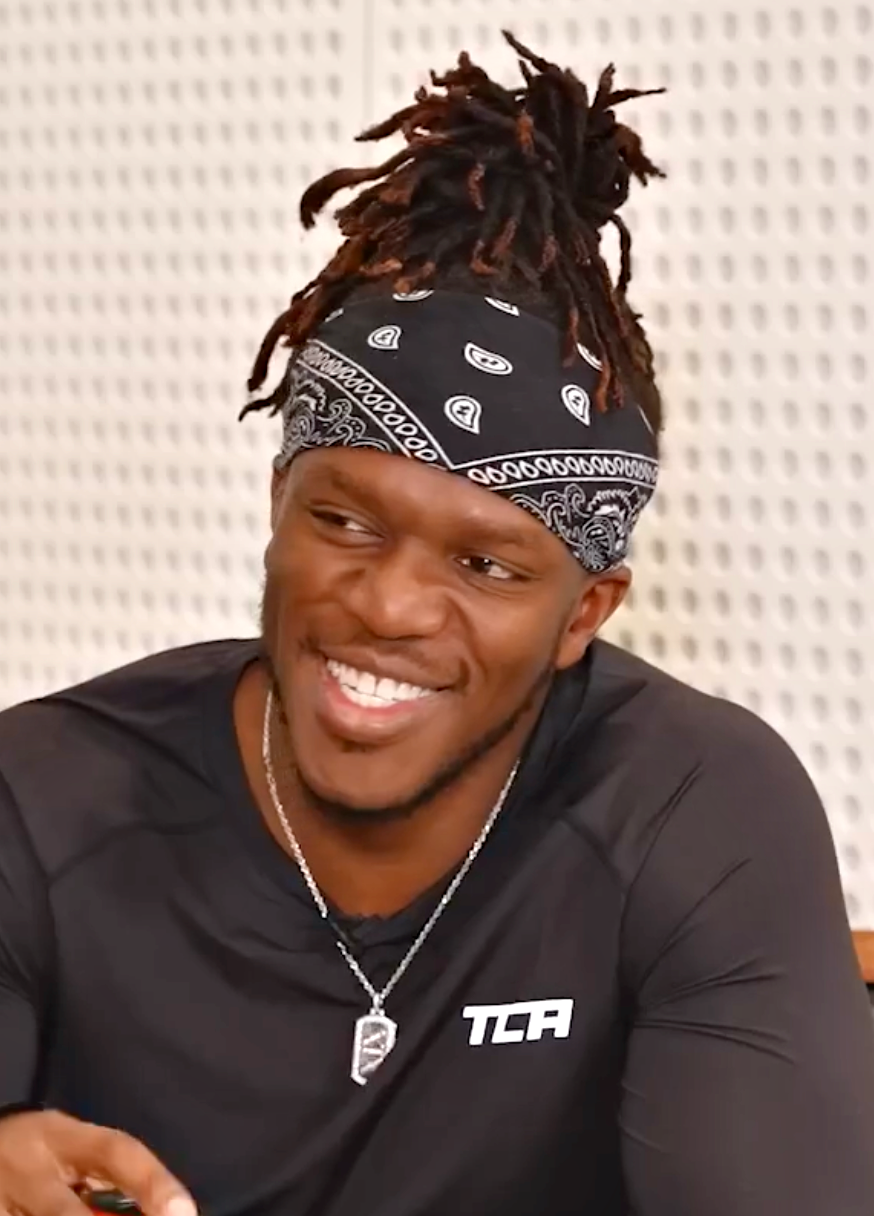
- Olatunji in 2024
- Born: Olajide Olayinka Williams Olatunji; 19 June 1993 (age 33); London, England
- Occupations: YouTuber; streamer; rapper; influencer; boxer; actor; entrepreneur; panelist; television personality
- Title: Founder and co-owner of Prime, Lunchly, XIX Vodka, Sidemen Clothing, Sides and Best Breakfasts; Co-founder of Misfits Boxing

YouTube information
- Channels: KSI; KSI Music; KSI+; KSIClips
- Years active: 2009–present
- Genres: Entertainment; association football; comedy; gaming; music
- Subscribers: 18.5 million (main channel); 24.8 million (music channel); 47.49 million (combined) (Note: Subscribers, broken down by channel: 24.8 million (KSI Music); 18.5 million (KSI); 3.43 million (KSIClips); 712 thousand (KSI+); 108 thousand (JideJunior))
- Views: 5.06 billion (main channel); 6.03 billion (music channel); 16.33 billion (combined) (Note: Views, broken down by channel: 6.33 billion (KSI Music); 5.06 billion (KSI); 5.07 billion (KSIClips); 172 million (KSI+); 1.36 million (JideJunior))
- Musical career
- Genres: British hip hop; trap; pop; garage
- Works: Discography; songs
- Years active: 2015–present
- Labels: Atlantic; Warner Music Group; RBC/BMG; Island; Dcypha
- Boxing career
- Nickname: The Nightmare
- Height: 6 ft 0 in (183 cm)
- Weight: Cruiserweight
- Reach: 76 in (193 cm)
- Stance: Orthodox

Boxing record
- Total fights: 6
- Wins: 4
- Win by KO: 3
- Losses: 1
- No contests: 1
- KSI's voice With Gymshark; Recorded November 2020
- Last updated: 4 July 2026

Olajide Olayinka Williams "JJ" Olatunji (Note: JJ is an abbreviation of "Jide Junior"—Jide is a hypocorism of KSI's first name, Olajide.) ( born 19 June 1993), known professionally as KSI, (Note: KSI is an abbreviation for "Knowledge Strength Integrity", which was derived from a clan he was a member of in the video game series Halo. His initial alias was KSIOlajidebt, a compound of "KSI", his forename, and the initials of British Telecom.) is a British YouTuber, influencer, musician, and former professional boxer. He is a co-founder and former member of YouTube group the Sidemen, the co-founder of Misfits Boxing and co-owner of several businesses, including Prime Hydration and Lunchly. KSI has also served as a judge on Britain's Got Talent since 2025. His main YouTube channel has over 19.2 million subscribers.

Born in London to parents of Yoruba heritage and raised in Watford, KSI was privately educated at Berkhamsted School. He registered the YouTube channel KSIOlajidebt in 2009 and built a following through his commentary videos of the FIFA video game series. His content later diversified to include vlogs and comedic skits. In 2019, he was the first black African ranked second by The Sunday Times in its list of most influential online creators in the United Kingdom. In 2021, he was listed in the Europe Entertainment category of Forbes 30 Under 30; he was later ranked by Forbes as the second-top creator of 2023. As of April 2026, he has over 46 million subscribers and 16 billion video views across his four active YouTube channels.

Creating hip-hop music as early as 2011, he first achieved commercial success with "Lamborghini" (featuring P Money) in 2015. His debut EP, Keep Up (2016), topped the UK R&B Albums Chart. He released his debut studio album, Dissimulation, in 2020, which peaked at number two on the UK Albums Chart. His second studio album, All Over the Place (2021), debuted at number one and was certified platinum by the BPI; its lead singles "Don't Play" (with Anne-Marie and Digital Farm Animals) and "Holiday" both debuted at number two on the UK Singles Chart and were nominated for Song of the Year at the Brit Awards. He has achieved fourteen top 40 singles in the United Kingdom, with seven peaking in the top 10. He received the Brit Billion Award in 2024, for amassing over one billion music streams in the United Kingdom. He also starred in the direct-to-video comedy film Laid in America (2016), and has been the subject of multiple documentaries, including Amazon Prime Video's In Real Life (2023).

He was involved in a white-collar boxing match against Joe Weller in February 2018. Two further boxing events against American YouTuber Logan Paul took place, the second of which was a professional bout in which he won via split decision in November 2019. In August 2022, he fought two people in the same night, defeating rapper Swarmz and professional boxer Luis Alcaraz Pineda. In 2023, he fought FaZe Temperrr in January, Joe Fournier in May, and Tommy Fury in October, which he lost via unanimous decision. He retired from boxing in October 2026.

== Early life ==
Olajide Olayinka Williams Olatunji was born on 19 June 1993 in London and raised in Watford, Hertfordshire. His father, Olajide Olatunji, was born in Ibadan, Nigeria. His mother, Olayinka Olatunji (née Atinuke), is from Islington, London. He and his parents are from the Yoruba ethnic group. He was educated at Reddiford School in Pinner and Berkhamsted School in Berkhamsted, where he met future collaborator and Sidemen member Simon Minter.

KSI's younger brother, Deji Olatunji, is also a YouTuber and professional boxer who was previously known as ComedyShortsGamer. The brothers ranked first and second respectively as the "UK's Most Influential YouTube Creators" by Tubular Labs in 2015.

== YouTube and online career ==
=== 2008–2013: Beginnings and FIFA videos ===
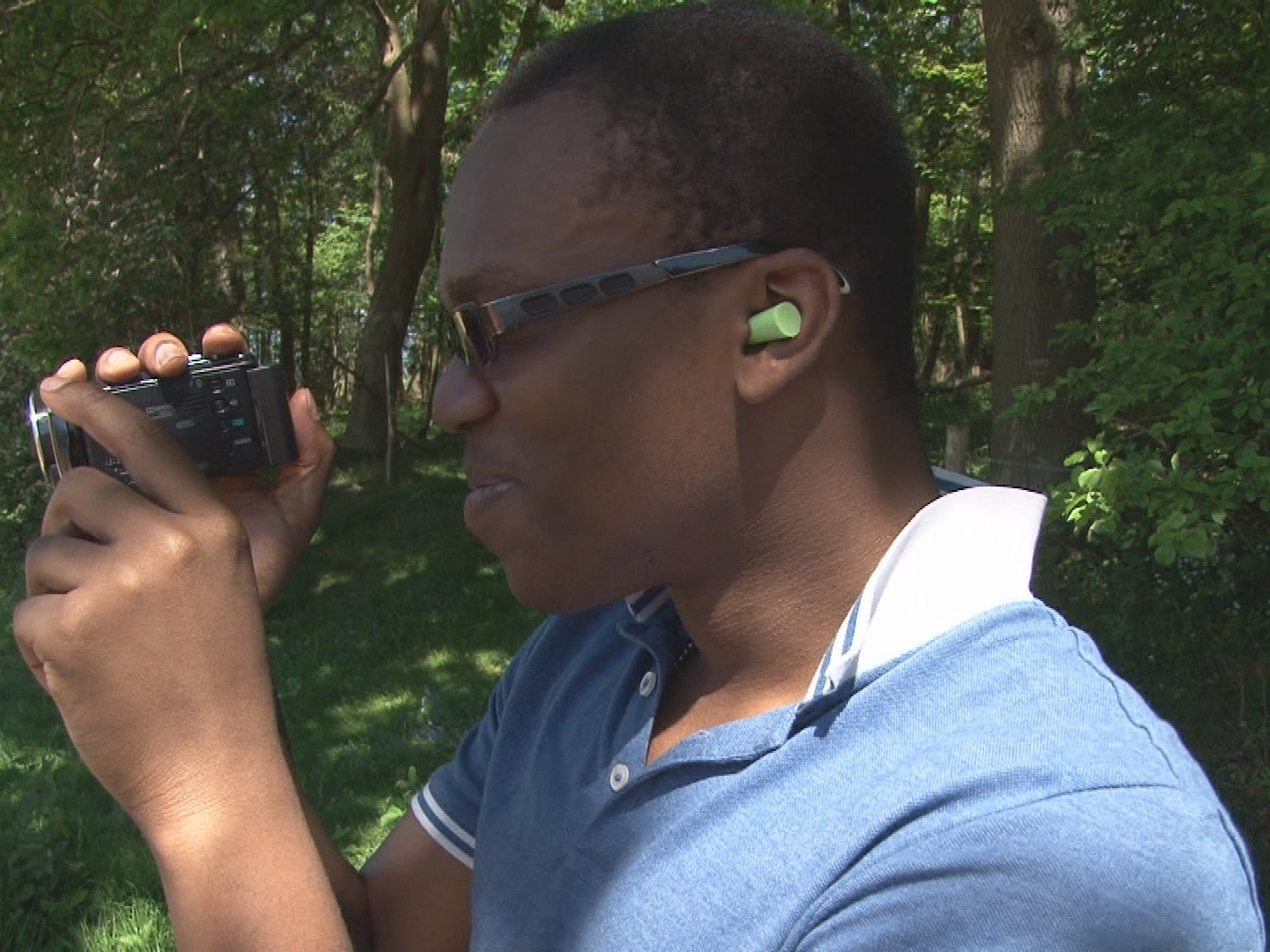
KSI shooting a video for his YouTube channel in 2012.

KSI registered his first account on YouTube under the username "JideJunior" in 2008 while in his early teens. He registered his current YouTube account on 24 July 2009 under the name KSI Olajide BT, where he uploaded gaming–commentary videos of the FIFA video game series from his bedroom at his parents' house in Watford. "KSI" stands for Knowledge Strength Integrity, which was taken from a Halo clan.

He dropped out of sixth form college to pursue his YouTube career once he was earning steady monthly revenue from his uploads. In an interview in 2014, he recounted asking his teacher whether he should drop-out. His teacher asked how much KSI was making from YouTube, to which KSI answered, "around £1,500 a month", which was more than his teacher earned. His parents initially disapproved, but later became supportive and featured in a number of his videos. KSI later uploaded more vlog-style content and played a variety of games and in 2012, the channel reached a million subscribers.

KSI's rise to fame was not without controversy, with him being widely criticised for his self-described 'rape-face', a recurring joke on his channel during 2012 and 2013. He was the centre of a controversy following third-party allegations of sexual harassment of female staff at a Eurogamer event in 2012, that went so far as accusing him of sexual assaulting a spokesmodel Brandy Brewer, despite her tweeting that she consented to the motorboat, writing, "it's called comedy……relax". As a result, Microsoft cut ties with KSI and he was banned from Eurogamer events. KSI subsequently apologised "for any offence the video of 15 months ago may have caused in the short time it was on his YouTube channel, references to it since and subsequently used by other people" and stated his desire to move on from the incident and "be judged on the great content and value he gives to brands and partners, without controversy."

=== 2013–2018: Joining the Sidemen ===
In October 2013, KSI signed with Maker Studios' sub-network, Polaris. Beginning 19 October 2013, KSI was part of the British YouTube group known as the Sidemen. The group produces online videos, most often consisting of challenges, sketches and video-game commentary, as well as selling exclusive Sidemen merchandise.

In July 2014, KSI and Comedy Central UK launched KSI: Demolished, a five-episode comedy roast web series in which British comedians, such as Kojo, Michelle de Swarte, Bobby Mair, and Alex Lowe, take turns to roast KSI. In August 2014, KSI was the fourth most popular personality among U.S. teenagers, according to a survey done by Variety. On 18 August 2014, KSI teamed up with Endemol for a new sports show called Rule'm Sports. In October 2014, KSI signed with MLG.tv, a streaming media service focused on gaming and esports, as part of the roster of live streamers. In September 2015, KSI was ranked 15th on Business Insider's list of "The 15 most popular YouTubers in the world". A year later in November 2016, he was ranked first on Business Insider's list of "The 19 biggest British YouTube stars".

On 4 August 2017, KSI tweeted that he would be leaving the Sidemen, citing conflicts with fellow member, Ethan Payne. Shortly thereafter, he released a number of diss track videos criticising members of his then-former group, to which most of the members responded back with their own. Later that month, KSI released a video in which he claimed that he was being deported from the United States for receiving an incorrect visa. In November 2017, KSI released a video discussing whether his supposed falling out with the Sidemen was real or fake, saying, "[the drama] wasn't entirely real but wasn't entirely fake either."

=== 2019–present: Career expansion, mainstream success, and leaving the Sidemen ===
In 2019, he was ranked second by The Sunday Times in its list of the top 100 UK influencers. In 2020, The Times named KSI to be Britain's biggest influencer. In April 2021, he was included on the Forbes 30 Under 30 Europe 2021 Entertainment list. In September 2023, Forbes ranked KSI as the second top creator of 2023, earning an estimated $24 million. In July 2024, KSI appeared in a YouTube video challenge by American YouTuber MrBeast titled "50 YouTubers Fight for $1,000,000".

On 31 May 2026, KSI announced that he would be departing the Sidemen as he became "too busy" for them, and that his last video with them would be that day. On 5 June, the Sidemen issued a joint statement confirming KSI's departure and wishing him the best. The group also stated that they had intended to release a coordinated farewell video, but KSI independently uploaded his own announcement without informing the other members.

== Music career ==
=== 2015–2016: Early releases ===
Having sporadically written and produced comedy–rap songs for his YouTube channel since 2011, KSI began pursuing a musical career outside of the context of his YouTube persona with the release of his debut single, "Lamborghini", featuring British grime MC P Money, on 23 March 2015, with Dcypha Productions. The song charted at number 30 on the UK Singles Chart, and remained on the charts for another two weeks, moving to number 68 and then to number 96 before dropping out of the top 100.

"Keep Up", the title song for KSI's debut extended play of the same name, featuring Jme, was released on 13 November 2015, reaching number 45 on the UK Singles Chart. The full EP was released on 8 January 2016, through Island Records, debuting at number 13 on the UK Albums Chart and number one on the UK R&B Albums Chart.

On 29 April 2016, KSI released "Goes Off", featuring Mista Silva, as the first single from his second EP titled Jump Around. The EP's second single, "Friends with Benefits", featuring MNDM, was released on 29 July 2016, reaching number 69 on the UK Singles Chart. The full EP was released on 28 October 2016 through Island Records. One of the EP's songs, "Touch Down", featuring rapper and singer Stefflon Don, appeared on the soundtrack of the 2017 film Baywatch.

=== 2017–2019: Independent releases ===
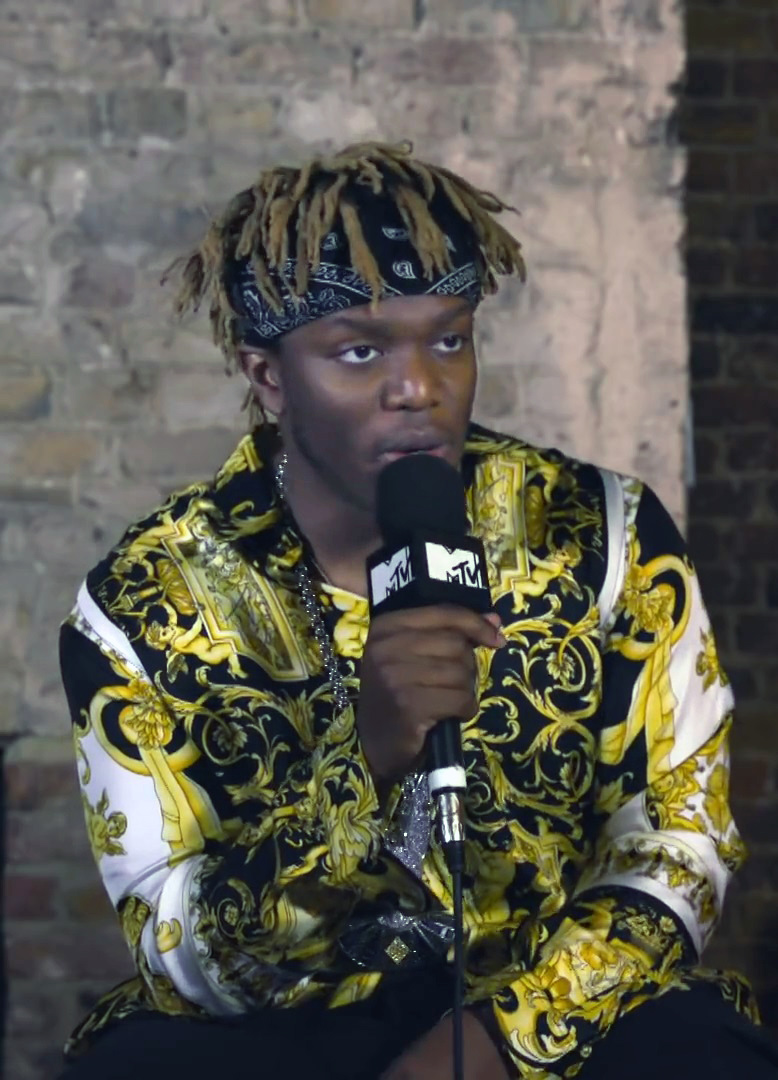
KSI during an interview with MTV International in 2019

On 23 June 2017, KSI independently released "Creature", which reached number 100 on the UK Singles Chart. "Creature" was the first single from KSI's third EP, Space, which was released independently on 30 June 2017. On 6 October that year, KSI released his fourth EP, Disstracktions, which includes diss tracks against fellow Sidemen members W2S and Behzinga. The EP reached number 31 on the UK Albums Chart and number one on the UK R&B Albums Chart. One week before its release, KSI announced that the EP would be his "final release" with Island Records and that he would be releasing music independently.

On 2 February 2018, KSI released "Uncontrollable", featuring Big Zuu. The song played during KSI's ring walk for his boxing fight against Joe Weller and charted at number 89 on the UK Singles Chart. KSI released "On Point" on 17 August 2018, which was played during his ring walk for his second boxing bout.

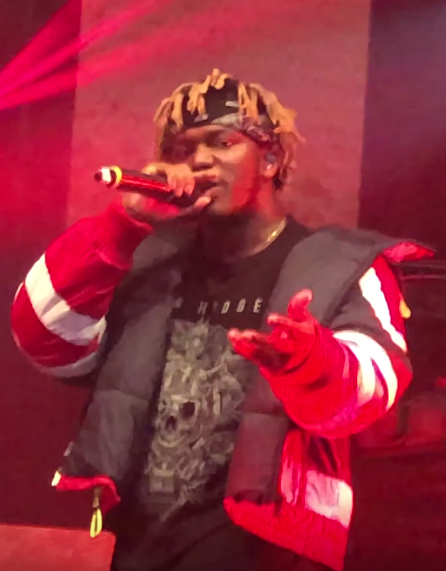
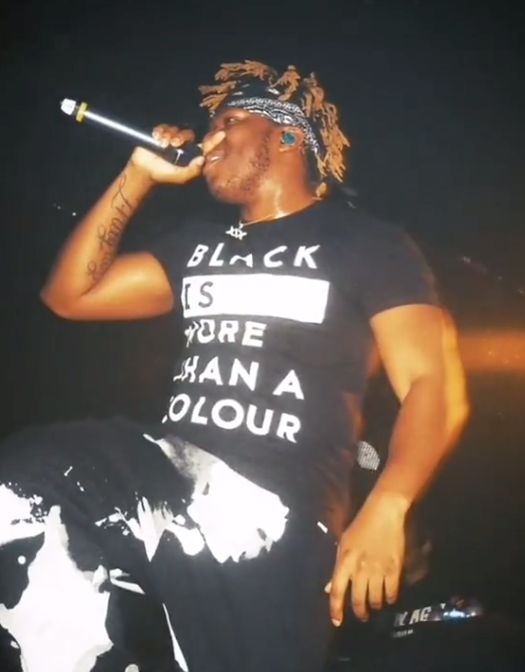
KSI performing in 2019 on his New Age tour

On 12 April 2019, KSI released a collaborative album with Randolph titled New Age. It debuted at number 17 on the UK Albums Chart and at number one on the UK R&B Albums Chart.

=== 2019–2020: New record label signing and Dissimulation ===
On 4 November 2019, it was announced that KSI had signed with RBC Records and BMG to "take [his] music to the next level" and "further develop his music career in the US and internationally". In addition to managing KSI's future releases, it was confirmed that the label would be administering and reissuing KSI's independent catalogue recordings. That day, it was confirmed that KSI had already started recording his debut studio album. On 8 November 2019, "Down Like That", featuring Rick Ross, Lil Baby and S-X, was released as the album's lead single. It was performed live by the three featured artists as KSI's entrance music for his boxing rematch against Logan Paul.

The song peaked at number 10 on the UK Singles Chart and it has been certified silver by the British Phonographic Industry (BPI) for sales of 200,000 units in the country. On 15 December, KSI, Miniminter, TBJZL, and Zerkaa released a Christmas themed single titled "The Gift" under the Sidemen banner featuring S-X, which charted at number 77 in the UK. A further three singles preceded the album: "Wake Up Call", featuring Trippie Redd, which debuted at number 11 on the UK Singles Chart; "Poppin", featuring Lil Pump and Smokepurpp, which charted at number 43 in the UK; and "Houdini", featuring Swarmz and Tion Wayne, which debuted at number six on the UK Singles Chart and received a silver certification from the BPI.

KSI's debut studio album, titled Dissimulation, was released on 22 May 2020. The album debuted at number two on the UK Albums Chart and further charted in 15 other countries. It was the UK's best-selling debut album by a British artist in 2020 and it has been certified gold by the BPI for sales of 100,000 units in the country. The album spawned two further UK top 40 singles, "Cap", featuring Offset, and "Killa Killa", featuring Aiyana-Lee. KSI was scheduled to perform at Parklife, Longitude and Reading and Leeds music festivals in 2020 to promote Dissimulation, but these were later cancelled due to the COVID-19 pandemic.

KSI featured on "Lighter" by British DJ and record producer Nathan Dawe. The song peaked at number three on the UK Singles Chart and became one of the UK's best-selling songs of 2020. It has been certified platinum by the BPI for sales of 600,000 units in the UK and it was nominated for Best British Single at the 2021 BRIT Awards. KSI also featured on "Loose" by Zimbabwean-British artist S1mba, which peaked at number 14 on the UK Singles Chart.

=== 2020–present: All Over the Place and new releases ===
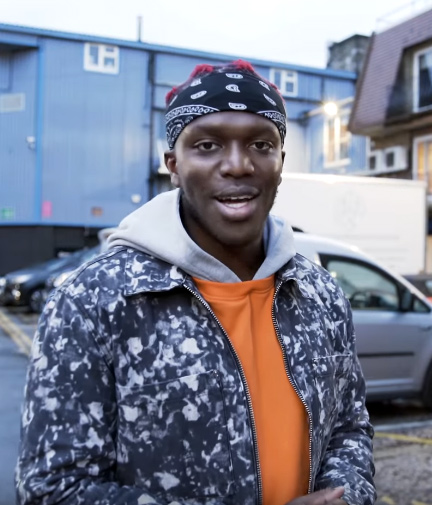
KSI in 2020

On 23 October 2020, KSI released the first single from his second album, "Really Love" featuring Craig David and Digital Farm Animals, which peaked at number three on the UK Singles Chart and has been certified gold by the BPI. On 15 January 2021, KSI released the album's second single, "Don't Play" with Anne-Marie and Digital Farm Animals. The song debuted at number two on the UK Singles Chart, becoming KSI's highest-charting single in the UK to date, and has been certified platinum by the BPI. On 12 March 2021, KSI released the album's third single, "Patience" featuring Yungblud and Polo G, which debuted at number 3 on the UK Singles Chart and has been certified silver by the BPI. On 26 April 2021, KSI announced via his social media the release of his second album All Over the Place, which was released on 16 July that year. It debuted at number 1 on the UK Album Charts, giving KSI his first-ever chart-topper, and has been certified gold by the BPI for surpassing 100,000 sales in the country. On 18 June 2021, KSI released the album's fourth single, "Holiday", which was only featured on the platinum edition of the album. The song debuted at number 2 on the UK Singles Chart, making it KSI's highest-charting solo single to date. On 6 August 2021, KSI released the album's fifth single, "Lose" with American rapper Lil Wayne, and was the lead single for the deluxe edition of the album, which was released on 27 August. The single peaked at number 18 on the UK Singles Chart and also debuted at number 86 on the Billboard Hot 100, becoming KSI's first ever single to enter that chart.

On 6 May 2022, KSI featured on "Locked Out" by S-X. The single is S-X's third single for his debut album. "Locked Out" became S-X's first single to chart in the UK Official Charts which peaked at number 53. On 30 May, it was announced that KSI had signed with Atlantic Records and Warner Music UK "following his huge collaboration with Anne-Marie on Don't Play". On 5 August, KSI released "Not Over Yet" featuring Tom Grennan. "Not Over Yet" charted at number four on the UK Single Charts, and debuted at number one on The Official Big Top 40. The single marked the first record under Atlantic Records. A remix featuring Headie One and Nines released on 28 August and served as KSI's ring walk tune in his bout against Luis Alcaraz Pineda on 27 August. On 30 September, KSI released "Summer Is Over". On 5 December, KSI, TBJZL, and Vikkstar123 released a Christmas-themed single titled "Christmas Drillings" under the Sidemen banner featuring Jme, which charted at number 3 in the UK. On 27 January 2023, KSI released "Voices" featuring Oliver Tree. On 13 May, KSI released "Easy" with Bugzy Malone and R3HAB, which served as KSI's ring walk tune in his bout against Joe Fournier on the same night.

On 31 August 2024, KSI performed a two-part concert at MF & DAZN: X Series 17, in which he previewed two unreleased singles, "Low" and "Thick of It", featuring Trippie Redd. On 3 October, KSI released both songs as a double-single release, the latter of which was subjected to negative reception and mockery. On 19 November, KSI received BRIT Billion Award for amassing over one billion music streams in the UK. On 13 December, KSI released his third single of the year, "Dirty", which had previously been leaked in July 2024. The song received a positive reception following the negative response to "Thick of It". On 23 January 2025, "Thick of It" was nominated for Song of the Year at The BRIT Awards 2025. On 30 May, KSI released another double-single with "Catch Me If You Can" and "So Far Away", the latter featuring S-X which had previously leaked in July 2024 alongside "Dirty".

== Boxing career ==
=== Starting influencer boxing against Joe Weller ===
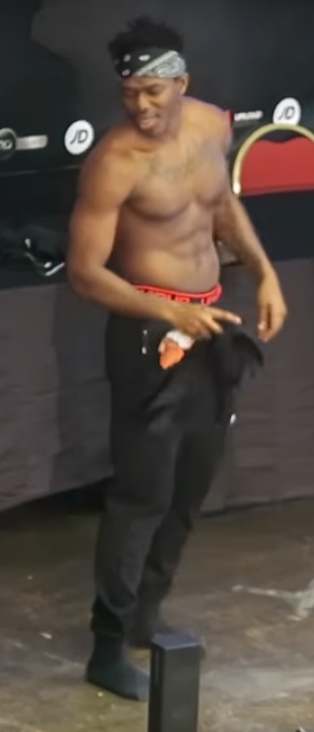
KSI during a weigh-in before his amateur boxing match against Joe Weller

Supposed hostilities between KSI and British YouTuber Joe Weller began towards the end of 2017. Following public disagreements on Twitter and diss-tracks between the pair, they announced that they would host an amateur boxing match on 3 February 2018 at the Copper Box Arena, London, to settle the feud. During the announcement, the pair confronted each other, with KSI mocking Weller's struggles with depression and his use of antidepressants, for which he later apologised.

The fight was won by KSI 1 minute and 37 seconds into the third round by way of technical knockout. KSI expressed his respect for Weller after the fight for being "way harder, way tougher than I thought," and praised him for his commitment to raising awareness for mental health, before calling out American YouTuber Logan Paul, his brother Jake Paul, and retired footballer Rio Ferdinand.

=== Two bouts against Logan Paul ===
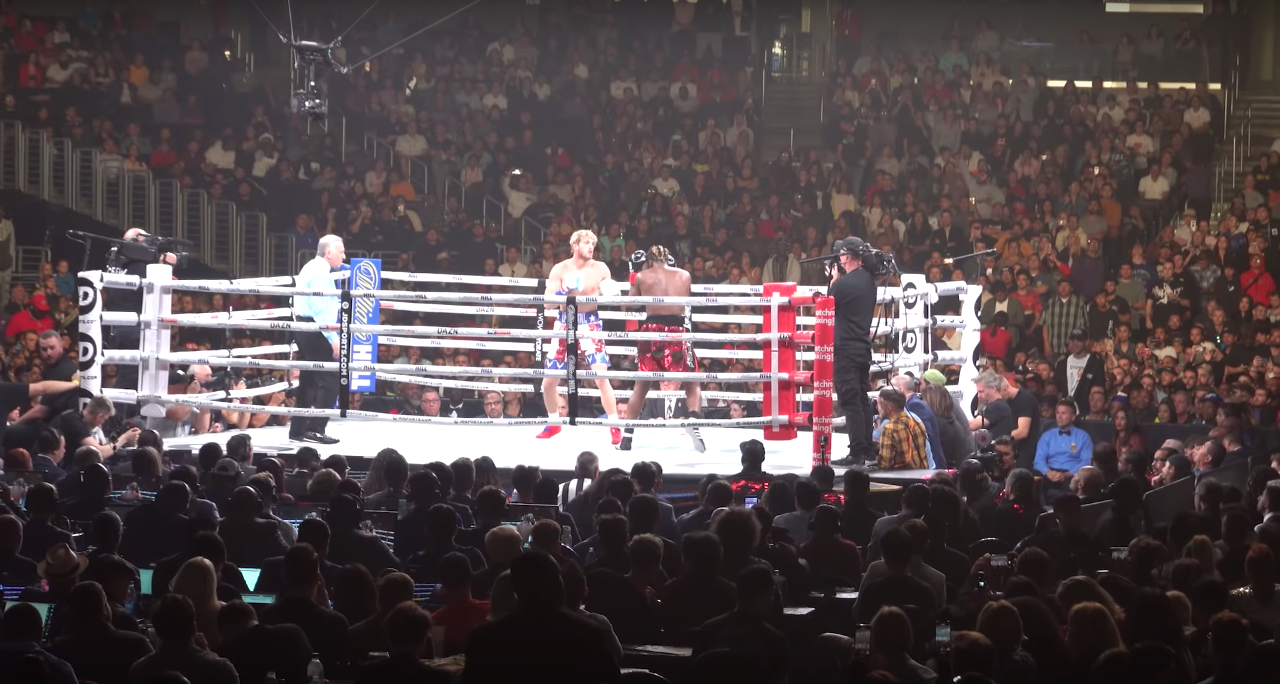
KSI and Logan Paul during their second bout on 9 November 2019

On 24 February 2018, it was announced that KSI would be fighting Logan Paul in a white-collar boxing amateur boxing match. The fight ended as a majority draw, with two judges scoring the fight even at 57–57 and a third judge scoring 58–57 in favour of KSI.

A rematch between KSI and Paul was held on 9 November 2019 at the Staples Center, Los Angeles, and was promoted by Eddie Hearn. Unlike the first fight, the rematch was a professional fight without the use of headgear. KSI was trained by professional boxers Viddal Riley and Jeff Mayweather, uncle of Floyd Mayweather Jr. KSI defeated Paul via split decision, with two judges scoring the bout 56–55 and 57–54 in favour of KSI, and a third judge scoring the fight 56–55 in favour of Paul.

=== Return after hiatus ===
==== KSI vs Swarmz & Pineda ====
On 1 July 2022, it was announced that KSI vs Alex Wassabi was scheduled to take place on as the headliner to MF & DAZN: X Series 001 on 27 August 2022; however, due to a major concussion, it was announced on 6 August that Swarmz would be Wassabi's replacement. This marked the first event under KSI's promotion company Misfits Boxing.

On 16 August, it was announced that KSI will be facing a second opponent, thus billing the event "2 Fights 1 Night." His initial second fight was scheduled to be against Bulgarian boxer Ivan Nikolov, who was pulled from the fight due to Nikolov having multiple white supremacist and Neo-Nazi tattoos. On 20 August, Mexican professional boxer Luis Alcaraz Pineda was announced as KSI's second opponent on 27 August. KSI defeated Swarmz via 2nd round KO and won the vacant MFB cruiserweight title. KSI then defeated Alcaraz Pineda via 3rd round KO and retained his MFB cruiserweight title.

==== KSI vs Temperrr ====
On 19 November 2022, it was announced that KSI would face Dillon Danis as the headliner of MF & DAZN: X Series 004 on 14 January 2023, at Wembley Arena, London, England. However, on 4 January, Danis withdrew due to lack of preparation, a lack of a coach, and issues with the contracted weight. It was announced that KSI would defend his MF cruiserweight title against Brazilian YouTuber and FaZe Clan founder FaZe Temperrr, replacing Danis within a week's notice. KSI defeated Temperrr via 1st round KO and retained his MFB cruiserweight title.

==== KSI vs Fournier ====
On 22 March 2023, it was announced that KSI would face businessman and professional boxer Joe Fournier as the headliner of MF & DAZN: X Series 007 on 13 May at Wembley Arena in London, England. KSI originally defeated Fournier via 2nd round KO and retained his MFB cruiserweight title; however, controversy arose after replays showed KSI landing an illegal elbow strike during the finishing sequence. On 15 May, Fournier appealed the decision, and the Professional Boxing Association (PBA) called for both fighters to make their cases, and a decision will be made by 19 May at the latest. On 19 May, the PBA officially ruled the bout a no-contest.

=== First defeat against Tommy Fury ===
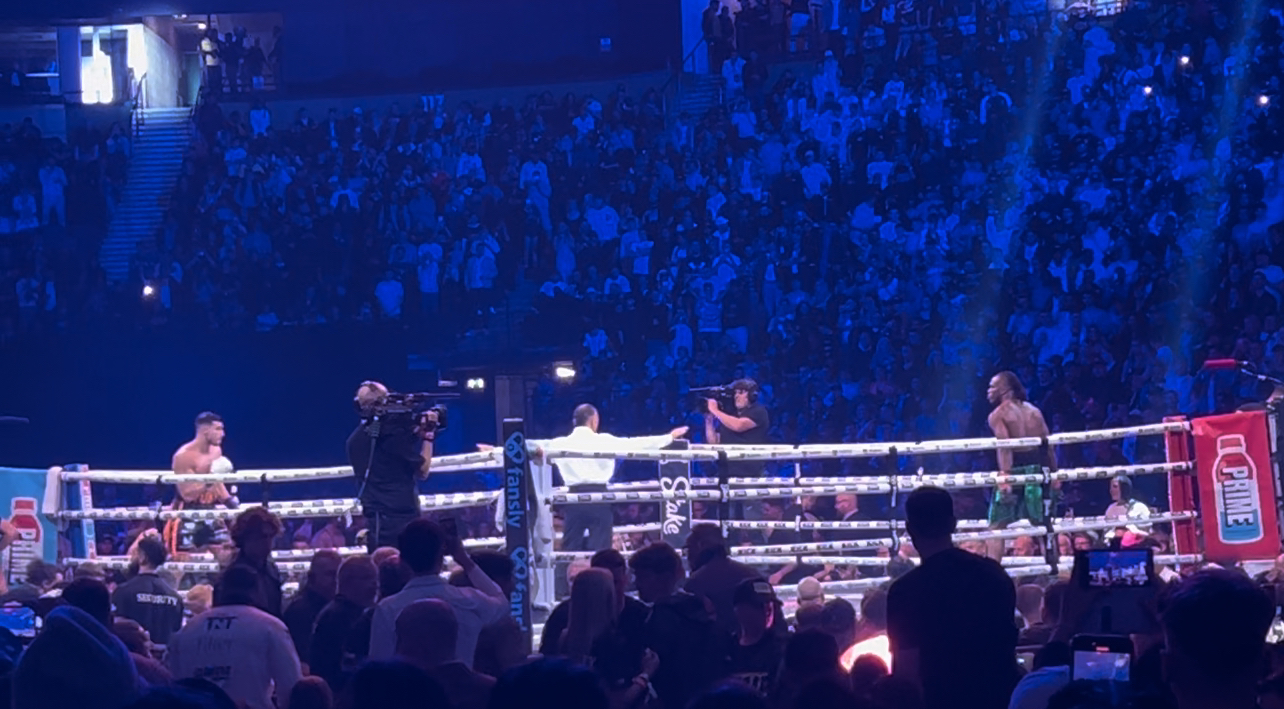
KSI fighting Tommy Fury at Manchester Arena, Manchester

On 28 July, it was announced that KSI and Logan Paul would both headline MF & DAZN: X Series 10 – The Prime Card on 14 October at Manchester Arena in Manchester, England. On 30 July, it was announced that KSI would in fact be facing Tommy Fury. Fury defeated KSI via a majority decision. On 15 October, the results were changed to a unanimous decision victory for Fury due to judge Rafael Ramos, who had previously scored the bout 57-57 on the scorecard, which was mathematically incorrect. The event generated 1,300,000 pay-per-view buys, making it one of the largest boxing events in 2023.

After the bout had concluded, KSI lashed out at Fury and insisted that the result was a "robbery". Many online and attendees sided with KSI, bevelling that he did enough to win the fight, including English sports promoter Eddie Hearn, who was in attendance.

On 19 October, KSI submitted an appeal to the Professional Boxing Association (PBA). On 1 December, the PBA announced on Twitter that they had rejected the appeal, stating there were "no grounds" to overturn the result. Despite the result, KSI's manager Mams Taylor stated that the appeal is still ongoing and that they are moving into the second of three possible stages.

=== Cancelled bouts and retirement ===
On 2 June 2024, KSI confirmed on Twitter that he would return to the ring in August after a 10-month break from the Fury loss in October of last year. Reports began to state that KSI was in negotiations to face former unified light welterweight champion Amir Khan. On 4 June, Khan confirmed the negotiations. However, on 8 June, KSI confirmed in a YouTube video that Khan will not be his opponent but potentially for later in the year. In that video, KSI also confirmed he will be fighting on 31 August 2024, in Dublin, Ireland, and challenged American internet personality Slim Albaher and American mixed martial artist Anthony Taylor to a 2 vs. 1 outnumbered tag team match. On 30 June 2024, the bout between KSI, Albaher and Taylor was confirmed. However, fans began to speculate if the bout had been cancelled following KSI deleting the bout announcement across his social media. On 1 August, KSI confirmed his withdrawal in a Twitter post due to an injury sustained.

During the broadcast of X Series 17, KSI stated he was eyeing to return in early 2025. On 3 January 2025, Misfits Boxing announced that his return would be announced during the broadcast of X Series 20 on 18 January. News broke hours before the announcement that former England and Premier League winning left-back Wayne Bridge was being lined up to face KSI for 29 March. On the night, KSI came into the ring and revealed his original opponent withdrew, leading into a face off with Bridge. The pair got into a brawl after KSI pushed Bridge and brought up John Terry and Bridge's former girlfriend Vanessa Perroncel. However, two days later, Bridge withdrew from the bout due to the comments made by KSI about Perroncel. On 4 February, it was announced that American mixed martial artist Dillon Danis, who KSI was originally scheduled to face at X Series 004, would replace Bridge and headlined X Series 21 – Unfinished Business at Manchester Arena, Manchester. On 21 March, it was announced that the fight will be postponed due to KSI suffering from an illness. On 4 April, Misfits Boxing co-president Mams Taylor confirmed on X that X Series 22 – Blinders & Brawls was moved from 12 April to 16 May, and will be their next event, confirming that X Series 21 – Unfinished Business was no longer happening.

On 10 January 2026, in an interview with Ranveer Allahbadia, KSI claimed that he was "done with boxing" and had even turned down deals to fight Jake Paul that were up to $30 million. However during a 28 February interview with Heart, KSI stated that he was not retired from boxing but was "on a break". On 10 October, KSI officially announced his retirement from boxing.

== Other ventures ==
=== Film and television career ===
In 2016, KSI and Caspar Lee starred in the British direct-to-video comedy film Laid in America. The film was written and directed by Sam Milman and Peter Vass and was produced by The Fun Group LLC and Max Gottlieb. The film was released direct-to-video by Universal Pictures on 26 September 2016. Jason Best of Movie Talk gave the film 1 out of 5 and called it "Crass and witless".

In 2018, KSI released a documentary film titled KSI: Can't Lose. The film reveals the behind-the-scenes story of what led KSI to become the YouTube champion of the world after his boxing debut fight against fellow YouTube star Joe Weller and how KSI will use what he learned to fight Logan Paul. The film was produced by fellow YouTuber Callux's film studio, After Party Studios, and was distributed by Sony Pictures Home Entertainment.

KSI makes a brief appearance in the Amazon Original sports docuseries All or Nothing: Arsenal, which documented the club by spending time with the coaching staff and players behind the scenes both on and off the field throughout their 2021–22 season.

In 2023, KSI released a documentary called KSI: In Real Life, produced by Amazon Prime Video and Louis Theroux, focusing on KSI's life and career. Theroux stated that it would be "an opportunity to see another side of JJ, understanding how he got where he is, the world of a premium online content creator today, and a man who has made it his brand never to lose, as he takes on the music business."

In June 2024, KSI alongside the Sidemen created a reality competition series called Inside. The series first premiered on 2 June on the Sidemen's YouTube channel. In November 2024, Netflix acquired the streaming rights and announced a second series, which premiered in March 2025, alongside an American version called Inside: USA, which premiered in September 2025.

In February 2025, KSI appeared as a guest judge on Britain's Got Talent series 18 on ITV1, standing in for Bruno Tonioli due to his commitments in America with Dancing with the Stars, and for Simon Cowell, who stepped down following the death of former One Direction star Liam Payne. He also appeared as guest judge in the fifth semi-final, in which he pressed the Live Show Golden Buzzer for magician and eventual winner Harry Moulding, and as guest performer in the live final, performing many of his hits an including a guest appearance by Tom Grennan for the song Not Over Yet. For series 19 which started in February 2026, KSI returned and replaced Tonioli to become a full time judge.

=== Business ventures ===
KSI and the Sidemen have founded multiple businesses throughout their online careers. In 2014, the group launched a clothing brand under the Sidemen Clothing banner. In November 2021, they founded a restaurant chain known as Sides in collaboration with Reef. In October 2022, they launched their own vodka brand known as XIX Vodka. In March 2024, they launched a breakfast cereal brand known as Best Breakfasts in collaboration with Mornflake.

In February 2021, KSI announced on Twitter the creation of his own record label named "The Online Takeover" in partnership with his music manager Mams Taylor. Shortly after, he announced the first signee of his label, which was American-British singer Aiyana-Lee, who featured on the track "Killa Killa". On 13 May, KSI announced that he and Proper Loud have signed Yxng Dave to The Online Takeover, marking him the second artist to be signed to the label.

In June 2021, KSI announced that he and Wasserman Boxing had partnered up to launch a boxing promotional company called "Misfits Boxing". The first event was scheduled to take place on 27 August 2022, with KSI also set to make his boxing return as the main event. A series of other boxing events titled "MF & DAZN: X Series" in collaboration with DAZN, who were the distributors for KSI's previous rematch against Logan Paul, was announced, along with events to follow, marking the KSI vs Swarmz and Luis Alcaraz Pineda event as MF & DAZN: X Series 001. On 10 January 2023, it was announced that Misfits Boxing and DAZN had signed a 5-year deal to continue distribute events with two pay-per-view each year.

In January 2022, KSI founded a drinks company known as Prime alongside his former rival Logan Paul. Prime is a range of sports drinks, drink mixes, and energy drinks created and marketed by Prime Hydration, LLC.

In September 2024, KSI, Paul, and MrBeast founded a kids lunch kit company known as Lunchly – a joint venture between Prime and Feastables. It contains Prime, has Feastables chocolate and each one has a unique food. There are three kits: pizza, fiesta nachos, and turkey stack 'ems. They are all inspired by Lunchables.

In November 2024, it was announced that KSI would be the president of Baller League UK, a six-a-side football league.

On 3 March 2026, KSI purchased a minority stake in the club Dagenham & Redbridge F.C. and became a part owner. On 6 March, Variety announced that KSI alongside After Party Studios will be producing a docuseries titled "Race to the Top", chronicling his takeover of the club similarly to "Welcome to Wrexham".

=== Video games ===
In 2016, KSI teamed up with Endemol Shine Group to publish KSI Unleashed, a video game that launched on iOS and Android systems. KSI poked jabs at fellow YouTuber PewDiePie, claiming that "Why would I make anyone have to spend money to buy my mobile app game?", referring to the fact that PewDiePie: Legend of the Brofist was not a free application. KSI Unleashed was removed from the Google Play Store and App Store on an unknown date.

In 2018, KSI took part in the promotional efforts for EA Sports UFC 3 by training alongside former UFC middleweight world champion Michael Bisping.

In August 2021, KSI teamed up with Roblox and hosted a virtual album launch party inside the game.

=== Writing ===
In 2015, KSI published an autobiography titled KSI: I Am a Bellend. The book was released on 24 September 2015, in the UK and five days later in the United States, and KSI toured to support the book from its release until 4 October 2015.

On 18 October 2016, KSI and the Sidemen released a book titled Sidemen: The Book, published by Coronet Books, and embarked on a UK-wide promotional tour. A number one best-seller in the UK, the book sold 26,436 copies within its first three days of release.

=== Wrestling ===
On 1 April 2023, KSI appeared at WWE's flagship event, WrestleMania 39, during the match between Logan Paul and Seth "Freakin" Rollins. He accompanied Paul during his entrance wearing a Prime bottle costume and interfered in the match, but was frog splashed by Paul after Rollins quickly switched himself with KSI. On 8 March 2024, KSI made another appearance on SmackDown with Paul to celebrate Prime's partnership with WWE; however, they would be interrupted by Randy Orton, who would hit KSI with an RKO.

== Personal life ==
KSI is a supporter of Arsenal F.C. In his "Googling Myself" video, KSI revealed that he is agnostic.

In March 2021, KSI faced criticism for misgendering a trans person and using a transphobic slur in a Sidemen video. He later apologised, claiming not to have known that the word was offensive. In April 2023, KSI used the racial slur Paki in a Sidemen video parodying the British game show Countdown. He later apologised on Twitter and announced he was taking a break from social media. The video has since been removed. He then visited the Al-Hikam Institute, a mosque in Bradford, to "educate himself", where he apologised again for the hurt and disappointment he had caused.

=== Income and wealth ===
In 2015, KSI's earnings for the past year were estimated by Forbes as being over $4.5 million, ranking him as the fifth-highest-paid YouTuber in the world at the time.

In 2018, Esquire magazine reported that, according to Social Blade, KSI can make up to £250,000 in advertising revenue from one video and that product endorsements on his social media cost around £75,000. Heavy reported in the same year that KSI was the director of three UK companies with equity totalling £1.7 million ($2.2 million).

Business Insider reported that KSI's amateur boxing match versus Logan Paul in 2018 generated around £8.5 million ($11 million) from pay-per-view revenue alone and a further live gate revenue of over £2.7 million ($3.5 million) from ticket sales. Some estimates calculated the potential earnings at £30 million to £40 million from each fight, but KSI dismissed these claims, stating that his earnings were "a high amount" but "nowhere near £40 million or £20 million". Forbes reported that KSI was contracted to earn a minimum amount of $900,000 from his second fight against Logan Paul in 2019.

In an interview with Men's Health in 2020, KSI confirmed that he owns over ten properties "all around England" with a combined worth of over £10 million. In 2020, The Sunday Times estimated KSI's earnings to be £12 million a year; a year later, they believed that his estimated earnings had gone up by another £13 million.

KSI has been open about his investments in cryptocurrency. He revealed that he had lost almost £6 million worth of cryptocurrency in 2021. He claims to be done with cryptocurrency following his losses.

In July 2023, KSI invested in The Fellas Studios, a production company owned by YouTubers Callum "Calfreezy" Airey and Joshua "TheBurntChip" Larkin. It was also revealed that he had invested in notwoways, an East London sneaker brand owned by YouTuber Callum "Callux" McGinley.

On 17 August 2024, KSI, along with the Sidemen, appeared and was ranked 21st on The Times's list of "The UK’s top 30 richest gamers and creators in 2024", estimating £50 million in fortune shared among the group.

In January 2026, Olatunji appeared on BBC One's Michael McIntyre's Big Show, during which McIntyre opened the YouTube Studio app on his phone during the "Send to All" segment; it displayed an estimated revenue figure of $105,000 for the previous 28 days for his main YouTube channel.

== Charity ==
In 2015, KSI donated $10,000 to an online charity stream done by YouTuber Castro1021, and he participated in the Race Against Slime event, raising money for SpecialEffect, a foundation developing technology to aid people with physical disabilities to play video games.

On 8 May 2020, KSI helped out at a food bank to support The Independent's Help the Hungry campaign. On 18 December 2020, KSI prepared meals to support the Evening Standard's Food for London Now campaign. KSI donated £10,000 to BBC Radio 1's "Lol-a-thon" fundraiser for Comic Relief on 11 March 2021. On 30 March 2021, it was announced that KSI had signed an open letter, written by Lenny Henry, to urge black British people to take the COVID-19 vaccine.

On 15 December 2023, KSI faced American streamer IShowSpeed in a charity boxing sparring match after a year-long banter rivalry. They managed to raise over £50,000 for the Anthony Walker Foundation.

On 14 February 2025, KSI participated in "Match for Hope 2025", a football charity event hosted in Doha, Qatar, as a player and co-captain for team AboFlah & KSI, facing off against team Chunkz & IShowSpeed. The match ended with team AboFlah & KSI's 6-5 victory over team Chunkz & IShowSpeed. The event managed to raise more than $10.7 million for charity.

== Boxing record ==
=== Professional ===
2 fights	1 win	1 loss
By decision	1	1

No.	Result	Record	Opponent	Type	Round, time	Date	Location	Notes
2	Loss	1–1	Tommy Fury	UD	6	14 Oct 2023	Manchester Arena, Manchester, England	Originally scored MD win for Fury
1	Win	1–0	Logan Paul	SD	6	9 Nov 2019	Staples Center, Los Angeles, California, US	

=== MF–Professional ===
4 fights	3 wins	0 losses
By knockout	3	0
No contests	1	

No.	Result	Record	Opponent	Type	Round, time	Date	Location	Notes
4	NC	3–0 (1)	Joe Fournier	NC	2 (6), 1:26	13 May 2023	Wembley Arena, London, England	Retained MFB cruiserweight title Originally a KO win for KSI; overturned due to an accidental elbow strike
3	Win	3–0	FaZe Temperrr	KO	1 (6), 2:19	14 Jan 2023	Wembley Arena, London, England	Retained MFB cruiserweight title
2	Win	2–0	Luis Alcaraz Pineda	KO	3 (3), 0:50	27 Aug 2022	The O2 Arena, London, England	Won inaugural MFB cruiserweight title
1	Win	1–0	Swarmz	KO	2 (3), 0:28	27 Aug 2022	The O2 Arena, London, England	

=== Amateur ===
2 fights	1 win	0 losses
By knockout	1	0
Draws	1	

No.	Result	Record	Opponent	Type	Round, time	Date	Location	Notes
2	Draw	1–0–1	Logan Paul	MD	6	25 Aug 2018	Manchester Arena, Manchester, England	
1	Win	1–0	Joe Weller	TKO	3 (6), 1:30	3 Feb 2018	Copper Box Arena, London, England	

== Pay-per-view bouts ==
United Kingdom
No.	Date	Fight	Billing	Network	Buys	Revenue	Source(s)
1	25 August 2018	KSI vs Paul	—N/a	YouTube	1,300,000	£13,000,000	
2	27 August 2022	KSI vs Swarmz; KSI vs Pineda	2 Fights 1 Night	DAZN	445,000	£4,450,000	
3	14 January 2023	KSI vs Temperrr	—N/a	DAZN	300,000	£3,000,000	
4	13 May 2023	KSI vs Fournier	—N/a	DAZN	300,000	£6,000,000	
5	14 October 2023	KSI vs Fury	Judgement Day	DAZN	1,300,000	£26,000,000	
Total					3,645,000	£52,450,000	

United States
No.	Date	Fight	Billing	Network	Buys	Revenue	Source(s)
1	9 November 2019	KSI vs. Paul II	—N/a	DAZN (US)	1,784,000	—N/a	
1	9 November 2019	KSI vs. Paul II	—N/a	Sky Box Office (UK)	216,000	£2,160,000	
Total					2,000,000	£2,160,000	

== Filmography ==
Key
†	Denotes films that have not yet been released

Film
Year	Title	Role	Notes	Ref.
2015	Minecraft: Into the Nether	Himself	Documentary	
2016	Laid in America	Duncan	Lead role	
2018	KSI: Can't Lose	Himself	Documentary	
2019	Test Case	Tola	Short film	
2022	Beast Mode On	Himself	Documentary	
2022	Talk to Me	Himself	Uncredited; archival footage	
2023	KSI: In Real Life	Himself	Documentary	
2023	Untold: Jake Paul the Problem Child	Himself	Documentary; archival footage	
2023	The Naughty List	Candy Cane Capone	Short film	
2023	The Spy Who Loved Eggnog	Himself	Short film	
2024	The Sidemen Story	Himself	Documentary	

Television
Year	Title	Role	Notes	Ref.
2013	The Gadget Show	Himself	Series 17, Episode 5	
2013	Friday Download	Himself	Series 6, Episode 10	
2016	Rise of the Superstar Vloggers	Himself	Documentary	
2017	Saturday Mash-Up!	Himself	Episode: "Cel Spellman"	
2018	The Big Narstie Show	Himself	Series 1, Episode 6	
2020	Top Gear	Himself	Series 28, Episode 5	
2020	Sport Relief 2020	Himself	Television special	
2020	The Playlist	Himself	Series 4, Episode 8	
2020–2021	Celebrity Gogglebox	Himself	Series 2 (episodes 1–4) and Series 3 (episode 6–8)	
2020	Gogglebox	Himself	Series 16	
2021	The Great Stand Up to Cancer Bake Off	Contestant	Series 4, Episode 4	
2021	Blue Peter	Himself	Episode dated 22 July 2021	
2022	All or Nothing: Arsenal	Himself	Documentary; episode: "New Beginnings"	
2023	WrestleMania 39	Himself	Night 1; accompanied Logan Paul disguised as Prime bottle	
2024	WWE SmackDown	Himself	Series 26, Episode 10	
2024–2026	Inside	Host	Reality Show created by the Sidemen; also executive producer	
2025	Britain's Got Talent	Guest Judge	Series 18 auditions stand in for Bruno Tonioli and Simon Cowell respectively, and fifth judge in Semi-Final 5, plus the Live Final.	
2026–present	Britain's Got Talent	Judge	Series 19	
2025–present	Baller League UK	Himself / Commentator	Six-a-side football league	
2025	Inside: USA	Host	American reality Show created by the Sidemen; also executive producer	
2026	Outside	Host	Reality Show created by the Sidemen; filmed prior to KSI's departure with the Sidemen	
2026	America's Got Talent	Guest Judge	Series 21 Finale	

Web
Year	Title	Role	Notes	Ref.
2014	5-A-Side	Matt Clark	5 episodes	
2014	KSI: Demolished	Himself	5 episodes	
2014	The Sidemen Experience	Himself	5 episodes	
2016	Pass the Pad	Himself	Presenter; 5 episodes	
2016–2017	YouTube Rewind	Himself	Episode: "The Ultimate 2016 Challenge"; Episode: "The Shape of 2017"	
2017	Bad Weather Films	Curly a.k.a. Curl	Episode: "Parkour Boys"	
2018	The Sidemen Show	Himself	7 episodes	
2018	Formula E Voltage	Himself	Episode: "2018 Ad Diriyah ePrix"	
2019	Does the Shoe Fit	Himself	Season 1	
2020	The Creator Games 1	Himself	Lost playing rock paper scissors against Matt Dajer	
2020	The Creator Games 2	Himself	Lost playing trivia against Rosanna Pansino	
2024	The Chase: Sidemen Edition	Himself	Special spin-off episode	
2026	Road to Glory	Himself	Docuseries for Prime FC; also executive producer	
2026	Race to the Top	Himself	Docuseries for Dagenham & Redbridge F.C.; also executive producer	

Video games
Year	Title	Role	Notes	Ref.
2021	Roblox	Himself	KSI held an album launch party in Roblox	
2025	WWE 2K25	Prime Bottle	Included as "Original Character"	
2026	Goals	Himself	Included in New Fearless Pack as DLC	

Music videos
Year	Title	Artist(s)	Role	Ref.
2013	"Get Hyper"	Droideka	Himself	
2018	"Man Don't Dance"	Big Shaq	Groomsman	
2020	"Going Clear"	Randolph	Himself	
2020	"Dangerous"	S-X	Himself	
2022	"Don't Lie"	A1 x J1 feat. Nemzzz	Himself	
2023	"Love To Smoke"	Wiz Khalifa	Himself	
2023	"Blacked Out"	Yxng Dave feat. Chip & DJ Fricktion	Himself	
2025	"365"	Talia Mar	Himself	

== Ludography ==
Year	Game	Platforms	Developer	Notes	Ref.
2016	KSI Unleashed	Android, iOS	Endemol Shine Group		
2018	BoxTuber	Android, iOS	Viker Limited		

== Discography ==
Studio albums

- Dissimulation (2020)
- All Over the Place (2021)

Collaborative albums

- New Age (with Randolph) (2019)

== Concert tours ==
- Jump Around Tour (2016)
- The New Age Tour (2019)
- All Over The Place Tour (2021–2022)

== Bibliography ==
- KSI (24 September 2015). KSI: I Am a Bellend. Orion Publishing Group. ISBN 978-1409161233.
- KSI (29 September 2015). I Am a Tool: How to Be a YouTube Kingpin and Dominate the Internet. HarperCollins. ISBN 978-0062444967.

== Awards and nominations ==
Year	Award	Category	Recipient(s)	Result	Ref.
2012	Shorty Awards	Best in Gaming	Himself	Nominated	
2016	NME Awards	Vlogger of the Year	Himself	Won	
2017	Shorty Awards	YouTuber of the Year	Himself	Nominated	
2017	British Book Awards	Non-Fiction: Lifestyle Book of the Year	Sidemen: The Book (shared with the Sidemen)	Nominated	
2017	BBC Radio 1's Teen Choice Awards	Best British Vlogger	Himself	Nominated	
2018	Global Awards	Social Media Superstar	Himself	Nominated	
2019	Shorty Awards	Best YouTube Ensemble	Himself (shared with the Sidemen)	Nominated	
2019	The Ring Year-End Awards	Event of the Year	KSI vs. Logan Paul II (shared with Logan Paul)	Nominated	
2020	MTV Awards	Hottest Summer Superstar	Himself	Nominated	
2020	MOBO Awards	Best Media Personality	Himself	Nominated	
2020	Amazon Music UK	Best Song	"Lighter" (shared with Nathan Dawe)	Won	
2021	The BRIT Awards	Song of the Year	"Lighter" (shared with Nathan Dawe)	Nominated	
2021	Music Week Awards	PR Campaign	Himself (shared with Carver PR)	Nominated	
2021	MTV Awards	Hottest Summer Superstar	Himself	Nominated	
2021	MTV Europe Music Awards	Best UK & Ireland Act	Himself	Nominated	
2021	Artist & Manager Awards	Breakthrough Artist of the Year	Himself	Nominated	
2022	The BRIT Awards	Song of the Year	"Don't Play" (shared with Anne-Marie & Digital Farm Animals)	Nominated	
2022	The BRIT Awards	Song of the Year	"Holiday"	Nominated	
2022	Global Awards	Best British Act	Himself	Nominated	
2022	Rated Awards	Personality of the Year	Himself	Won	
2022	MOBO Awards	Best Media Personality of the Year	Himself	Nominated	
2022	Streamy Awards	Best Creator Product	Prime Hydration (shared with Logan Paul)	Nominated	
2022	ESPN Ringside Social Award	Viral Moment of the Year	KSI defeating Swarmz & Luis Alcaraz Pineda in the same night	Third place	
2023	Global Awards	Best Male	Himself	Nominated	
2023	New Voice Awards	Best Social Series	20 vs. 1 (shared with the Sidemen)	Nominated	
2023	Streamy Awards	Creator Product	Prime Hydration (shared with Logan Paul)	Won	
2023	National Television Awards	Authored Documentary	KSI: In Real Life	Nominated	
2023	Happy Punch Awards	Best Knockout	KSI's knockout over FaZe Temperrr	Won	
2023	Happy Punch Awards	Male Fighter of the Year	Himself	Won	
2025	The BRIT Awards	Song of the Year	"Thick of It"	Nominated	

=== World Records ===
Publication	Year	World record	Record holder	R. Status	Ref.
Guinness World Records	2022	Most viewers for a charity sports match live stream on YouTube	As member of the Sidemen	Record	

=== Listicles ===
Publisher	Year	Listicle	Result	Ref.
Business Insider	2015	The 15 most popular YouTubers in the world	15th	
Business Insider	2016	The 19 biggest British YouTube stars	1st	
Forbes	2021	30 Under 30: Entertainment (Europe)	Featured Honoree	
Forbes	2023	Top Creators	2nd	
The Sunday Times	2019	UK's Top 100 Influencer	2nd	
The Times	2024	The UK’s top 30 richest gamers and creators	21st	
