= List of UK Independent Albums Chart number ones of 2020 =

These are the Official Charts Company's UK Independent Albums Chart number ones of 2020.

== Chart history ==
Issue date	Album	Artist(s)	Record label	Ref.
3 January	Grime MC	JME	Boy Better Know	
10 January	Gold	Gene Pitney	Crimson	
17 January	Seeking Thrills	Georgia	Domino	
24 January	More. Again. Forever.	Courteeners	Ignition	
31 January	Hotspot	Pet Shop Boys	x2	
7 February	Hotspot	Pet Shop Boys	x2	
14 February	Point of No Return	Those Damn Crows	Earache	
21 February	Teenage Wildlife - 25 Years Of	Ash	Echo	
28 February	Map of the Soul: 7	BTS	Big Hit	
6 March	F8	Five Finger Death Punch	Better Noise	
13 March	City of Love	Deacon Blue	Ear Music	
20 March	Good Years	The Shires	BMG	
27 March	I Am Not a Dog on a Chain	Morrissey	BMG	
3 April	Insomnia	Skepta/Chip/Young Adz	SKC M29	
10 April	I Am Moron	The Lovely Eggs	Egg	
17 April	Song for Our Daughter	Laura Marling	Chrysalis	
24 April	The Bonny	Gerry Cinnamon	Little Runaway	
1 May	The Bonny	Gerry Cinnamon	Little Runaway	
8 May	Eye of the Storm	Tide Lines	Tide Lines	
15 May	Straight Songs of Sorrow	Mark Lanegan	Heavenly	
22 May	All That Glue	Sleaford Mods	Rough Trade	
29 May	Dissimulation	KSI	RBC	
5 June	Everything Changes in the End	Vistas	Retrospect	
12 June	Sideways to New Italy	Rolling Blackouts Coastal Fever	Sub Pop	
19 June	Self Made Man	Larkin Poe	Tricki-Woo	
26 June	Punisher	Phoebe Bridgers	Dead Oceans	
3 July	Mordechai	Khruangbin	Dead Oceans	
10 July	A Steady Drip, Drip, Drip	Sparks	BMG	
17 July	The Glow	DMA's	Infectious	
24 July	House of Noise	Massive Wagons	Earache	
31 July	All Distortions Are Intentional	Neck Deep	Hopeless	
7 August	A Hero's Death	Fontaines D.C.	Partisan	
14 August	Whoosh!	Deep Purple	Ear Music	
21 August	Even in Exile	James Dean Bradfield	Montyray	
28 August	The Neon	Erasure	Mute	
4 September	The Red Planet	Rick Wakeman	MadFish	
11 September	Faith	Hurts	Lento	
18 September	Re-Animator	Everything Everything	Infinity Industries	
25 September	RTJ4	Run the Jewels	BMG	
2 October	Ultra Mono	Idles	Partisan	
9 October	Melanie C	Melanie C	Red Girl	
16 October	10 Songs	Travis	BMG	
23 October	Daniel	Daniel O'Donnell	DMG TV	
30 October	All Blessed	Faithless	BMG	
6 November	The Human Demands	Amy MacDonald	Infectious	
13 November	Disco	Kylie Minogue	BMG	
20 November	Young Dumb Thrills	McFly	BMG	
27 November	Be	BTS	Big Hit	
4 December	What the Future Holds	Steps	BMG	
11 December	Live at the Royal Albert Hall	Arctic Monkeys	Domino	
18 December	Singled Out	Shakin' Stevens	BMG	
25 December	Singled Out	Shakin' Stevens	BMG	

== See also ==
- List of UK Rock & Metal Albums Chart number ones of 2020
- List of UK Album Downloads Chart number ones of 2020
- List of UK Dance Albums Chart number ones of 2020
- List of UK R&B Albums Chart number ones of 2020
- List of UK Independent Singles Chart number ones of 2020
