= List of UK Independent Singles Chart number ones of 2020 =

These are the Official Charts Company's UK Independent Singles Chart number-one singles of 2020.

== Chart history ==
Chart date (week ending)	Song	Artist(s)	Record label	References
2 January	"Merry Xmas Everybody"	Slade	BMG	
9 January	"Pump It Up"	Endor	Defected	
16 January	"Pump It Up"	Endor	Defected	
23 January	"Pump It Up"	Endor	Defected	
30 January	"Pump It Up"	Endor	Defected	
6 February	"Pump It Up"	Endor	Defected	
13 February	"Wake Up Call"	KSI featuring Trippie Redd	BMG	
20 February	"Falling"	Trevor Daniel	Alamo	
27 February	"Falling"	Trevor Daniel	Alamo	
5 March ^{[b]}	"On"	BTS	Big Hit	
12 March	"Falling"	Trevor Daniel	Alamo	
19 March	"Falling"	Trevor Daniel	Alamo	
26 March	"Falling"	Trevor Daniel	Alamo	
2 April	"Falling"	Trevor Daniel	Alamo	
9 April	"Waze"	Skepta featuring Chip and Young Adz	SKC M29	
16 April	"Thank You Baked Potato"	Matt Lucas	Loudmouth Music	
23 April	"Pump It Up"	Endor	Defected	
30 April	"Part of the Plan"	Nafe Smallz featuring M Huncho	Nafe Smallz	
7 May	"Houdini"	KSI featuring Swarmz and Tion Wayne	BMG	
14 May	"Dinner Guest"	AJ Tracey featuring Mostack	AJ Tracey	
21 May	"Gooba"	6ix9ine	ScumGang	
28 May	"Dinner Guest"	AJ Tracey featuring Mostack	AJ Tracey	
4 June	"Dinner Guest"	AJ Tracey featuring Mostack	AJ Tracey	
11 June	"Dinner Guest"	AJ Tracey featuring Mostack	AJ Tracey	
18 June	"Dinner Guest"	AJ Tracey featuring Mostack	AJ Tracey	
25 June	"Dinner Guest"	AJ Tracey featuring Mostack	AJ Tracey	
2 July	"Dinner Guest"	AJ Tracey featuring Mostack	AJ Tracey	
9 July	"Dinner Guest"	AJ Tracey featuring Mostack	AJ Tracey	
16 July	"West Ten"	AJ Tracey and Mabel	AJ Tracey	
23 July	"West Ten"	AJ Tracey and Mabel	AJ Tracey	
30 July	"West Ten"	AJ Tracey and Mabel	AJ Tracey	
6 August	"West Ten"	AJ Tracey and Mabel	AJ Tracey	
13 August	"West Ten"	AJ Tracey and Mabel	AJ Tracey	
20 August	"West Ten"	AJ Tracey and Mabel	AJ Tracey	
27 August	"West Ten"	AJ Tracey and Mabel	AJ Tracey	
3 September	"Dynamite"	BTS	Big Hit	
10 September	"West Ten"	AJ Tracey and Mabel	AJ Tracey	
17 September	"West Ten"	AJ Tracey and Mabel	AJ Tracey	
24 September	"West Ten"	AJ Tracey and Mabel	AJ Tracey	
1 October	"West Ten"	AJ Tracey and Mabel	AJ Tracey	
8 October	"West Ten"	AJ Tracey and Mabel	AJ Tracey	
15 October	"Dynamite"	BTS	Big Hit	
22 October	"Dynamite"	BTS	Big Hit	
29 October	"Dynamite"	BTS	Big Hit	
5 November	"Really Love"	KSI featuring Craig David and Digital Farm Animals	BMG	
12 November	"Really Love"	KSI featuring Craig David and Digital Farm Animals	BMG	
19 November	"Really Love"	KSI featuring Craig David and Digital Farm Animals	BMG	
26 November	"Really Love"	KSI featuring Craig David and Digital Farm Animals	BMG	
3 December	"Life Goes On" ^{[b]}	BTS	Big hit	
10 December	"Merry Xmas Everyone"	Slade	BMG	
17 December	"Merry Xmas Everyone"	Slade	BMG	
24 December	"Merry Xmas Everyone"	Slade	BMG	
31 December ^{[a]}	"Don't Stop Me Eating"	LadBaby	Frtyfve	

== Notes ==
- ^{a} – The single was simultaneously number-one on the singles chart.
- ^{b} - The artist was simultaneously number one on the Independent Albums Chart.

== Number-one Indie artists ==
Position	Artist	Weeks at number one
1	AJ Tracey	20
2	Mostack	8
3	Endor	6
3	KSI	6
3	Trevor Daniel	6
3	BTS	6
4	Slade	4
5	6ix9ine	1
5	LadBaby	1
5	Matt Lucas	1
5	Nafe Smallz	1
5	Skepta	1

== See also ==
- List of UK Dance Singles Chart number ones of 2020
- List of UK R&B Singles Chart number ones of 2020
- List of UK Rock & Metal Singles Chart number ones of 2020
- List of UK Independent Albums Chart number ones of 2020
