= List of UK Dance Singles Chart number ones of 2020 =

The UK Dance Singles Chart is a weekly music chart compiled in the United Kingdom by the Official Charts Company (OCC) from sales of songs in the dance music genre (house, drum and bass, dubstep, etc.) in record stores and digital downloads. The chart week runs from Friday to Thursday with the chart-date given as the following Thursday.

This is a list of the songs which were number one on the UK Dance Singles Chart during 2020.

== Chart history ==
Chart date (week ending)	Song	Artist(s)	References
2 January	"Ride It"	Regard	
9 January	"Pump It Up"	Endor	
16 January	"Ride It"	Regard	
23 January	"Pump It Up"	Endor	
30 January	"Pump It Up"	Endor	
6 February	"Pump It Up"	Endor	
13 February	"Pump It Up"	Endor	
20 February	"Lonely"	Joel Corry	
27 February	"Lonely"	Joel Corry	
5 March	"Lonely"	Joel Corry	
12 March	"Lonely"	Joel Corry	
19 March	"Lonely"	Joel Corry	
26 March	"Lonely"	Joel Corry	
2 April	"Lonely"	Joel Corry	
9 April	"Lonely"	Joel Corry	
16 April	"Lonely"	Joel Corry	
23 April	"Lonely"	Joel Corry	
30 April	"Lonely"	Joel Corry	
7 May	"Lonely"	Joel Corry	
14 May	"Lonely"	Joel Corry	
21 May	"Lonely"	Joel Corry	
28 May	"Lonely"	Joel Corry	
4 June	"Lonely"	Joel Corry	
11 June	"Flowers"	Nathan Dawe featuring Jaykae	
18 June	"Secrets"	Regard and Raye	
25 June	"Secrets"	Regard and Raye	
2 July	"Don't Need Love"	220 Kid and Gracey	
9 July	"Secrets"	Regard and Raye	
16 July	"West Ten"	AJ Tracey and Mabel	
23 July	"Head & Heart"	Joel Corry featuring MNEK	
30 July ^{[a]}	"Head & Heart"	Joel Corry featuring MNEK	
6 August ^{[a]}	"Head & Heart"	Joel Corry featuring MNEK	
13 August ^{[a]}	"Head & Heart"	Joel Corry featuring MNEK	
20 August ^{[a]}	"Head & Heart"	Joel Corry featuring MNEK	
27 August ^{[a]}	"Head & Heart"	Joel Corry featuring MNEK	
3 September ^{[a]}	"Head & Heart"	Joel Corry featuring MNEK	
10 September	"Head & Heart"	Joel Corry featuring MNEK	
17 September	"Head & Heart"	Joel Corry featuring MNEK	
24 September	"Head & Heart"	Joel Corry featuring MNEK	
1 October	"Head & Heart"	Joel Corry featuring MNEK	
8 October	"Head & Heart"	Joel Corry featuring MNEK	
15 October	"Head & Heart"	Joel Corry featuring MNEK	
22 October	"Head & Heart"	Joel Corry featuring MNEK	
29 October	"Head & Heart"	Joel Corry featuring MNEK	
5 November	"Head & Heart"	Joel Corry featuring MNEK	
12 November	"Head & Heart"	Joel Corry featuring MNEK	
19 November	"Head & Heart"	Joel Corry featuring MNEK	
26 November	"Head & Heart"	Joel Corry featuring MNEK	
3 December	"Head & Heart"	Joel Corry featuring MNEK	
10 December	"Head & Heart"	Joel Corry featuring MNEK	
17 December	"Head & Heart"	Joel Corry featuring MNEK	
24 December	"Head & Heart"	Joel Corry featuring MNEK	
31 December	"Head & Heart"	Joel Corry featuring MNEK	

- ^{a} – the single was simultaneously number-one on the singles chart.

== Number-one artists ==
Position	Artist	Weeks at number one
1	Joel Corry	39
2	Endor	5
2	Regard	5
3	Raye	3
4	AJ Tracey	1
4	Gracey	1
4	Mabel	1
4	Nathan Dawe	1
4	220 Kid	1

== See also ==
- List of number-one singles of 2020 (UK)
- List of UK Dance Albums Chart number ones of 2020
- List of UK R&B Singles Chart number ones of 2020
- List of UK Rock & Metal Singles Chart number ones of 2020
- List of UK Independent Singles Chart number ones of 2020
