= List of UK Dance Albums Chart number ones of 2020 =

These are the Official Charts Company's UK Dance Albums Chart number ones of 2020. The chart week runs from Friday to Thursday with the chart-date given as the following Thursday.

== Chart history ==
Issue date	Album	Artist(s)	Record label	Ref.
2 January	Chilled Classics	Pete Tong, The Heritage Orchestra & Jules Buckley	UMOD	
9 January	The Annual 2020	Various Artists	Ministry of Sound	
16 January	The Workout Mix 2020	Various Artists	UMOD	
23 January	The Workout Mix 2020	Various Artists	UMOD	
30 January	The Workout Mix 2020	Various Artists	UMOD	
6 February	The Workout Mix 2020	Various Artists	UMOD	
13 February	The Workout Mix 2020	Various Artists	UMOD	
20 February	The Workout Mix 2020	Various Artists	UMOD	
27 February	The Workout Mix 2020	Various Artists	UMOD	
5 March	90s Dance Anthems	Various Artists	Crimson	
12 March	90s Dance Anthems	Various Artists	Crimson	
19 March	90s Dance Anthems	Various Artists	Crimson	
26 March	Sixteen Oceans	Four Tet	Text	
2 April	The Workout Mix 2020	Various Artists	UMOD	
9 April	The Workout Mix 2020	Various Artists	UMOD	
16 April	The Workout Mix 2020	Various Artists	UMOD	
23 April	The Workout Mix 2020	Various Artists	UMOD	
30 April	The Workout Mix 2020	Various Artists	UMOD	
7 May	The Workout Mix 2020	Various Artists	UMOD	
14 May	The Workout Mix 2020	Various Artists	UMOD	
21 May	The Workout Mix 2020	Various Artists	UMOD	
28 May	The Workout Mix 2020	Various Artists	UMOD	
4 June	Pacha Ibiza Classics	Various Artists	New State	
11 June	City of Sin	Dutty Moonshine Big Band	Dutty Moonshine	
18 June	Stratos Bleu	Smoove & Turrell	Jalapeno	
25 June	Throwback 90's Dance	Various Artists	Ministry of Sound	
2 July	Throwback 90's Dance	Various Artists	Ministry of Sound	
9 July	Throwback 90's Dance	Various Artists	Ministry of Sound	
16 July	Throwback 90's Dance	Various Artists	Ministry of Sound	
23 July	Monsters	The Midnight	Counter	
30 July	AirDrawn Dagger	Sasha	Music On Vinyl	
6 August	Throwback 90's Dance	Various Artists	Ministry of Sound	
13 August	Throwback 90's Dance	Various Artists	Ministry of Sound	
20 August	Happiness	The Beloved	New State	
27 August	Throwback 90's Dance	Various Artists	Ministry of Sound	
3 September	Let There Be House - Summer 2020	Various Artists	Let There Be House	
10 September	Energy	Disclosure	Island	
17 September	Energy	Disclosure	Island	
24 September	Throwback 90's Dance	Various Artists	Ministry of Sound	
1 October	Fun City	Bright Light Bright Light	YSKWN	
8 October	Throwback 90's Dance	Various Artists	Ministry of Sound	
15 October	The Remixes	The Stone Roses	Silvertone	
22 October	Portals	Sub Focus & Wilkinson	Virgin	
29 October	Sign	Autechre	Warp	
5 November	All Blessed	Faithless	BMG	
12 November	Dark Matter	CamelPhat	RCA	
19 November	Dance Floor Anthems	Various Artists	Crimson	
26 November	Dance Floor Anthems	Various Artists	Crimson	
3 December	Dance Floor Anthems	Various Artists	Crimson	
10 December	Dummy	Portishead	Go Beat	
17 December	Notes From the Underground	High Contrast	3 Beat/AATW	
24 December	In Colour	Jamie xx	Young Turks	
31 December	Throwback 90's Dance	Various Artists	Ministry of Sound	

== See also ==
- List of UK Albums Chart number ones of 2020
- List of UK Dance Singles Chart number ones of 2020
- List of UK Album Downloads Chart number ones of 2020
- List of UK Independent Albums Chart number ones of 2020
- List of UK R&B Albums Chart number ones of 2020
- List of UK Rock & Metal Albums Chart number ones of 2020
- List of UK Compilation Chart number ones of the 2020s
