= Put Your Hands Up =

Put Your Hands Up or Put Ya Hands Up may refer to:

- Put Your Hands Up!, a 2002 album by Chuck Brown

== Songs ==
- "Put Your Hands Up" (DJ Khaled song), 2010
- "Put Your Hands Up" (LL Cool J song), 2001
- "Put Your Hands Up (If You Feel Love)", by Kylie Minogue, 2011
- "Put Your Hands Up", by Benny Benassi from Hypnotica, 2003
- "Put Your Hands Up", by the Black & White Brothers (1998), used in "Put Your Hands Up in the Air!" by Danzel, 2005
- "Put Your Hands Up", by Inna from I Am the Club Rocker, 2011
- "Put Your Hands Up", by Matchbox Twenty from North, 2012
- "Put Your Hands Up", by Nadine from Insatiable, 2010
- "Put Your Hands Up", by Nerina Pallot from Year of the Wolf, 2011
- "Put Your Hands Up", by Random, 2005
- "Put Your Hands Up!!!", by Koda Kumi from Re(cord), 2019
- "Put Ya Hands Up", by Bomfunk MC's from Burnin' Sneakers, 2002
- "Put Ya Hands Up", by Jadakiss from Kiss tha Game Goodbye, 2001
- "Place Your Hands", by Reef, 1996

== See also ==
- Put Up Your Dukes, a 2007–2008 American sports television talk show
- Put Up Your Hands, a 1919 American film
- "Vifta med händerna", or "Throw Your Hands Up", a 2006 song by Basshunter
