= Cap (song) =

2020 song by KSI featuring Offset

Song by KSI featuring Offset

from the album Dissimulation
- Released: 22 May 2020
- Genre: Hip hop; trap
- Length: 3:11
- Label: RBC; BMG
- Songwriters: Olajide Olatunji; Kiari Cephus; Diego Avendano; Kevin Price; Jamal Rashid; Ivory Scott
- Producers: Diego Ave; Go Grizzly; Mally Mall

Music video
- "Cap" on YouTube

"Cap" is a song by British YouTuber and rapper KSI featuring American rapper Offset from the former's debut studio album, Dissimulation (2020) It was produced by Diego Ave, Go Grizzly, and Mally Mall. The song was released for digital download and streaming by RBC Records and BMG upon the release of the album. "Cap" is a hip hop and trap song. In both his verse and the chorus, KSI addresses fake people and those who have deceived, "back-stabbed" or "snaked" him in the past, with an auto-tune-heavy delivery.

"Cap" was met with mixed reviews from music critics. KSI received some criticism for his excessive use of auto-tune and he was also accused of "blatantly ripping off Travis Scott". The song debuted at number 24 on the UK Singles Chart and it additionally entered the music charts of Greece, Ireland, Lithuania and New Zealand. The music video was released alongside the album on 22 May 2020. The black and white video shows the two rappers surrounded by women in a warehouse filled with candles, before they perform the song on a stage in front of an audience.

== Writing and production ==
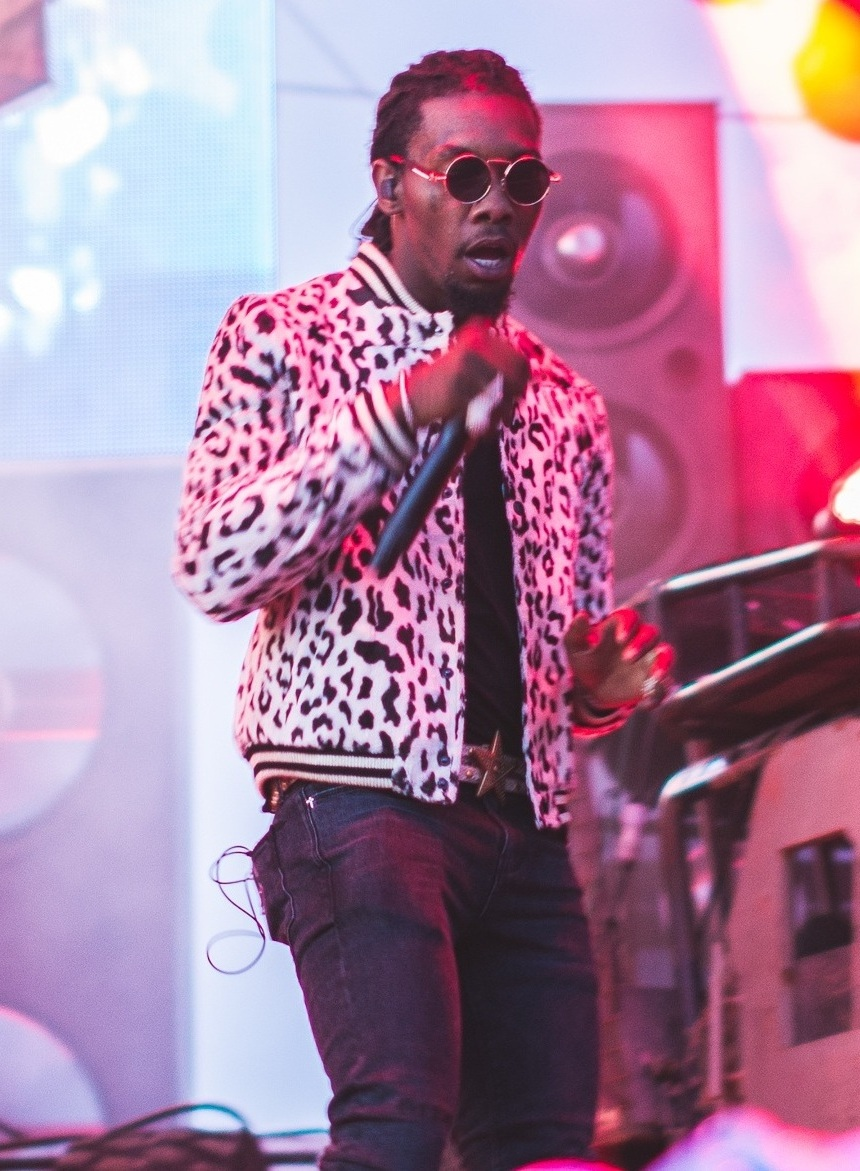
American rapper Offset is featured on "Cap".

"Cap" was produced by American record producers Diego Ave, Go Grizzly and Mally Mall. Offset wrote and recorded a verse to the instrumental. KSI was played the instrumental with Offset's verse during a recording studio session with the song's producers and American songwriter Ivory Scott in Los Angeles, United States, towards the end of 2019. KSI "fucked with it a lot" and wrote and recorded both a chorus and a verse to the instrumental. Offset "thought it was sick" and subsequently gave KSI authorisation to include the song on his debut studio album at the beginning of 2020. Speaking about collaborating with Offset, KSI said, "Offset has always been someone who I would love to have on a song, but I never thought I'd get the opportunity to have him on a song." KSI continued, "It was quite surreal [that] he said yes to me in the first place because I’m a YouTuber. I didn’t think he’d say yes. I thought he’d say, 'I’m not sure this is a good thing for me.' [But] he heard [my] music and he fucked with it. He thought it was sick. He wanted to be a part of [it]. He sees my hype. He sees [that] I’m taking [music] seriously."

== Music and lyrics ==
"Cap"
A 17-second sample of KSI's auto-tune-heavy chorus, in which he addresses fake people and those who have deceived him in the past.

"Cap" is a hip hop and trap song. Offset performs the first verse, while KSI performs both the chorus and the second verse, with an auto-tune-heavy delivery. In the song, KSI addresses fake people and those who have deceived him in the past, with lyrics including, "I can tell the fake from the fraud" and "I can't be no friends with no cap". Speaking to Genius about the inspiration for "Cap", KSI explained, "I wrote 'Cap' about certain people in my life; people who have back-stabbed me; people who are snakey with their movements." KSI continued, "I'm pretty good at spotting what their true agendas are... [because] I've been fucked over in the past."

== Critical reception ==
"Cap" was met with mixed reviews from music critics. In his review, Anthony Fantano of The Needle Drop criticised KSI for "really abusing the auto-tune" on "Cap". Fantano highlighted that the track's sound was evidently inspired by that of American rapper Travis Scott and consequently accusing KSI of "blatantly ripping off Travis Scott" on "Cap". Nevertheless, Fantano acknowledged that the song should "catch on because 'cap' and 'no cap' are such popular slang terms right now". Writing for Metro, Louise Griffin remarked that Offset is an "iconic feature" for KSI. In her review of Dissimulation (2020) for The Guardian, Kitty Empire acclaimed that "KSI just about holds his own against Offset on 'Cap'".

== Music video ==
The music video for "Cap" was directed by TajvsTaj. It was filmed in a warehouse in Los Angeles in March 2020. KSI announced the music video via social media on 18 May 2020 and a trailer for the music video was released on the same day. The music video was released to KSI's YouTube channel on 22 May 2020 at 15:00 BST. The video is shot in black and white and comprises shots of KSI and Offset surrounded by women in a warehouse filled with candles, before they perform the song on a stage in front of an audience. When asked about his favourite moment of the music video shoot, KSI responded, "Me and [Offset] going [hard as a motherfucker] on the chorus... Performing there was so sick."

== Commercial performance ==
In the United Kingdom, "Cap" sold 17,496 track-equivalent units in its first week of release. It debuted at number 24 on the UK Singles Chart, making it the second highest-placed new entry of that week. The song also debuted at number 14 on the UK Hip Hop and R&B Singles Chart. In the Republic of Ireland, "Cap" debuted at number 26 on the Irish Singles Chart, making it the second highest-placed new entry of that week. Elsewhere in Europe, the song charted at number 98 on the Greek Singles Chart and number 98 on the Lithuanian Singles Chart.

== Credits and personnel ==
Credits adapted from Tidal.

- KSI – songwriting, vocals
- Offset – songwriting, vocals
- Diego Ave – production, songwriting
- Go Grizzly – production, songwriting
- Mally Mall – production, songwriting
- Ivory Scott – songwriting
- Michalis Michael – mixing
- Henkka Niemistö – mastering

== Charts ==
Chart performance for "Cap"
Chart (2020)	Peak position
Greece (IFPI)	98
Ireland (IRMA)	26
Lithuania (AGATA)	98
New Zealand Hot Singles (RMNZ)	5
UK Singles (OCC)	24
UK Hip Hop/R&B (OCC)	14
UK Indie (OCC)	4

== Release history ==
Release dates and formats for "Cap"
Region	Date	Format(s)	Label(s)	Ref.
Various	22 May 2020	Digital download; streaming	RBC; BMG	
