= List of Official Albums Streaming Chart number ones of 2020 =

The Official Albums Streaming Chart is a weekly music chart in the United Kingdom which calculates the most popular albums on audio streaming sites.

== Number ones ==
Key
No.	nth album to top the Official Albums Streaming Chart
re	Return of an album to number one

Contents

No.	Artist (Note: The artist, song, date of reaching number one and number of weeks at number one are those given by the OCC.)	Album	Record label (Note: The record labels are those given by the OCC.)	Reached number one (for the week ending)	Weeks at number one	Ref.
re	Michael Bublé	Christmas	Reprise	2 January 2020	1	
re	Stormzy	Heavy Is the Head	Atlantic/Merky	9 January 2020	3	
re	Stormzy	Heavy Is the Head	Atlantic/Merky	16 January 2020	3	
re	Stormzy	Heavy Is the Head	Atlantic/Merky	23 January 2020	3	
53	Eminem	Music to Be Murdered By	Interscope	30 January 2020	1	
54	J Hus	Big Conspiracy	Black Butter	6 February 2020	2	
54	J Hus	Big Conspiracy	Black Butter	13 February 2020	2	
re	Lewis Capaldi	Divinely Uninspired to a Hellish Extent	EMI	20 February 2020	1	
55	Justin Bieber	Changes	Def Jam	27 February 2020	1	
re	Lewis Capaldi	Divinely Uninspired to a Hellish Extent	EMI	5 March 2020	2	
re	Lewis Capaldi	Divinely Uninspired to a Hellish Extent	EMI	12 March 2020	2	
56	Lil Uzi Vert	Eternal Atake	Atlantic	19 March 2020	1	
re	Lewis Capaldi	Divinely Uninspired to a Hellish Extent	EMI	26 March 2020	1	
57	The Weeknd	After Hours	Republic/XO	2 April 2020	1	
58	Dua Lipa	Future Nostalgia	Warner	9 April 2020	5	
58	Dua Lipa	Future Nostalgia	Warner	16 April 2020	5	
58	Dua Lipa	Future Nostalgia	Warner	23 April 2020	5	
58	Dua Lipa	Future Nostalgia	Warner	30 April 2020	5	
58	Dua Lipa	Future Nostalgia	Warner	7 May 2020	5	
59	Drake	Dark Lane Demo Tapes	OVO/Republic	14 May 2020	2	
59	Drake	Dark Lane Demo Tapes	OVO/Republic	21 May 2020	2	
re	Lewis Capaldi	Divinely Uninspired to a Hellish Extent	EMI	28 May 2020	1	
60	KSI	Dissimulation	RBC	4 June 2020	1	
61	Lady Gaga	Chromatica	Interscope	11 June 2020	2	
61	Lady Gaga	Chromatica	Interscope	18 June 2020	2	
re	Lewis Capaldi	Divinely Uninspired to a Hellish Extent	EMI	25 June 2020	3	
re	Lewis Capaldi	Divinely Uninspired to a Hellish Extent	EMI	2 July 2020	3	
re	Lewis Capaldi	Divinely Uninspired to a Hellish Extent	EMI	9 July 2020	3	
62	Pop Smoke	Shoot for the Stars, Aim for the Moon	Republic	16 July 2020	1	
63	Juice Wrld	Legends Never Die	Interscope	23 July 2020	2	
63	Juice Wrld	Legends Never Die	Interscope	30 July 2020	2	
64	Taylor Swift	Folklore	EMI	6 August 2020	2	
64	Taylor Swift	Folklore	EMI	13 August 2020	2	
re	Pop Smoke	Shoot for the Stars, Aim for the Moon	Republic	20 August 2020	3	
re	Pop Smoke	Shoot for the Stars, Aim for the Moon	Republic	27 August 2020	3	
re	Pop Smoke	Shoot for the Stars, Aim for the Moon	Republic	3 September 2020	3	
65	Nines	Crabs in a Bucket	Warner	10 September 2020	1	
re	Pop Smoke	Shoot for the Stars, Aim for the Moon	Republic	17 September 2020	5	
re	Pop Smoke	Shoot for the Stars, Aim for the Moon	Republic	24 September 2020	5	
re	Pop Smoke	Shoot for the Stars, Aim for the Moon	Republic	1 October 2020	5	
re	Pop Smoke	Shoot for the Stars, Aim for the Moon	Republic	8 October 2020	5	
re	Pop Smoke	Shoot for the Stars, Aim for the Moon	Republic	15 October 2020	5	
66	Headie One	Edna	Relentless	22 October 2020	1	
re	Pop Smoke	Shoot for the Stars, Aim for the Moon	Republic	29 October 2020	2	
re	Pop Smoke	Shoot for the Stars, Aim for the Moon	Republic	5 November 2020	2	
67	Ariana Grande	Positions	Republic	12 November 2020	1	
68	Little Mix	Confetti	RCA	19 November 2020	1	
re	Ariana Grande	Positions	Republic	26 November 2020	2	
re	Ariana Grande	Positions	Republic	3 December 2020	2	
re	Michael Bublé	Christmas	Reprise	10 December 2020	2	
re	Michael Bublé	Christmas	Reprise	17 December 2020	2	
69	Taylor Swift	Evermore	EMI	24 December 2020	1	
re	Michael Bublé	Christmas	Reprise	31 December 2020	1	
