= Poppin (KSI song) =

2020 song by KSI featuring Lil Pump and Smokepurpp

Single by KSI featuring Lil Pump and Smokepurpp

from the album Dissimulation
- Released: 27 March 2020
- Genre: Hip hop; trap
- Length: 3:33
- Label: RBC; BMG
- Songwriters: Olajide Olatunji; Gazzy Garcia; Omar Pineiro; Diego Avendano; Kevin Price; Jamal Rashid; Mica Levi (Note: The song's instrumental samples "Death" by Mica Levi, taken from the soundtrack of the film Under the Skin (2013), for which Levi and the track's producer Peter Raeburn are credited as songwriters on "Poppin".); Peter Raeburn
- Producers: Diego Ave; Go Grizzly; Mally Mall; OG Tint

KSI singles chronology
"Wake Up Call" (2020)	"Poppin" (2020)	"Houdini" (2020)

Lil Pump singles chronology
"Coronao Now" (2019)	"Poppin" (2020)	"Illuminati" (2020)

Smokepurpp singles chronology
"What I Please" (2019)	"Poppin" (2020)	"Off My Chest" (2020)

Music video
- "Poppin" on YouTube

"Poppin" is a song by British YouTuber and rapper KSI featuring American rappers Lil Pump and Smokepurpp. Produced by Diego Ave, Go Grizzly, Mally Mall, and OG Tint, it was released for digital download and streaming by RBC Records and BMG on 27 March 2020 as the third single from KSI's debut studio album, Dissimulation (2020). "Poppin" is a hyperactive hip hop & trap song with mumble rap elements, with a bouncy and bass-heavy production. The song's lyrics centre around flexing, mostly money and expensive jewellery. KSI admitted that "it's not a super serious song" and the aim was to "just have some fun with it".

"Poppin" received positive reviews from music critics, with many praising its bounciness and fast-paced flow. The song debuted at number 43 on the UK Singles Chart and it additionally entered the music charts of Ireland and New Zealand. The music video was released on 3 April 2020. The video places the three rappers in a crowded underground club setting, filled with dancing. KSI hosted a competition called the "Poppin Challenge" that gave fans the chance to appear on a remix of the song on the deluxe edition of the album.

== Writing and production ==
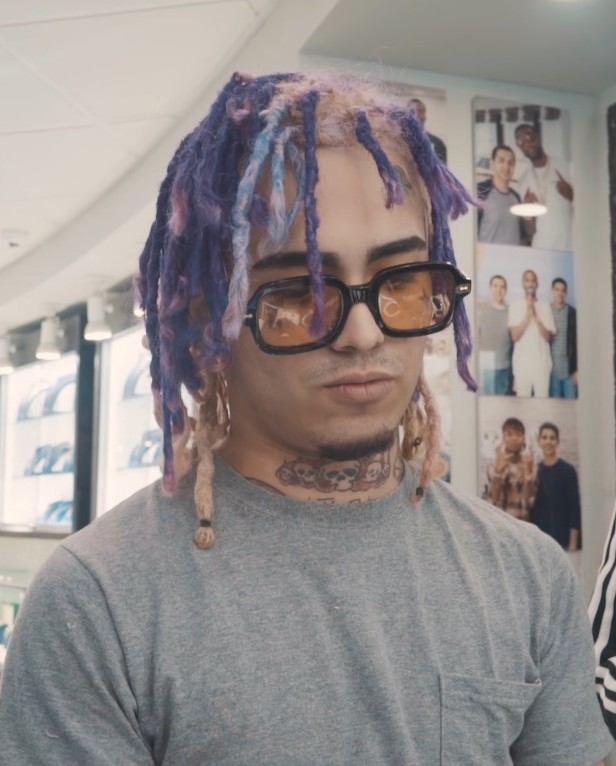
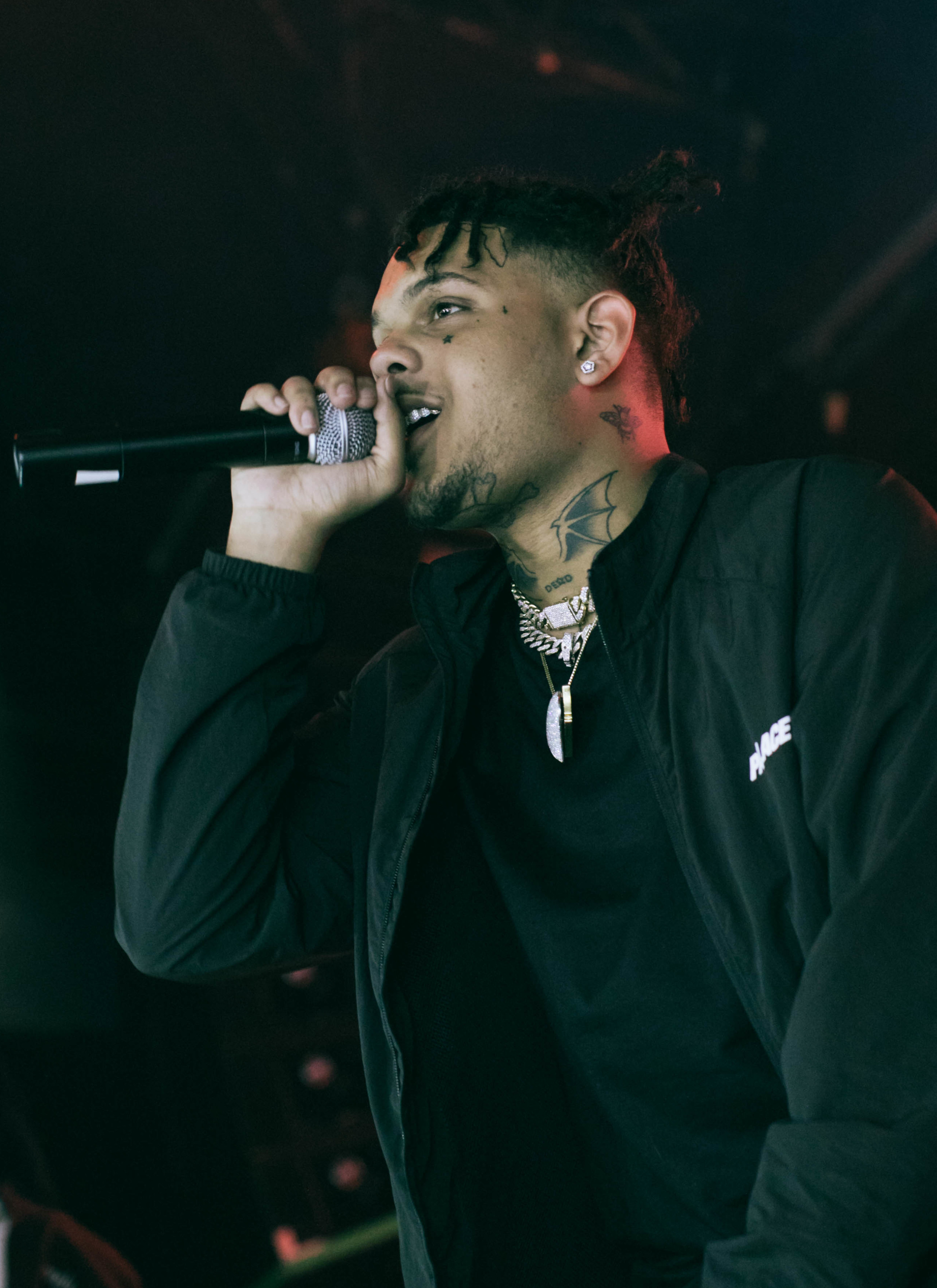
American rappers Lil Pump (left) and Smokepurpp (right) are featured on "Poppin".

"Poppin" was produced by American record producers Diego Ave, Go Grizzly, Mally Mall and OG Tint. The instrumental samples "Death" by Mica Levi, taken from the soundtrack of the film Under the Skin (2013), for which Levi and the track's producer Peter Raeburn were credited as songwriters on "Poppin". Smokepurpp wrote and recorded both a chorus and a verse to the instrumental, but "left it because he didn't really know what he was doing with it". KSI was played the instrumental with Smokepurpp's vocals during a recording studio session with the song's producers in Los Angeles, United States. KSI thought it was "sick" and asked if he could "do something with [it]". KSI wrote and recorded both a pre-chorus and a verse for "Poppin", which "Smokepurpp liked a lot". KSI and his manager Mams Taylor decided to have an additional rapper feature on "Poppin" to "make it even bigger", resulting in the addition of a verse by Lil Pump. Explaining the decision to feature Lil Pump on "Poppin", KSI said that they "wanted something playful" and "it made sense to have him on the track".

== Music and lyrics ==
"Poppin"
A 24-second sample of KSI's verse, for which his lyrics centre around flexing, mostly money and expensive jewellery. He delivers his lyrics with a sharp and fast-paced flow, over the bouncy instrumental.

"Poppin" is a hyperactive hip hop track with elements of trap and mumble rap. The song uses a bouncy and bass-heavy instrumental. Lil Pump raps the first verse, KSI raps both the second verse and the pre-chorus, and Smokepurpp raps both the third verse and the chorus. The song's lyrics centre around flexing, mostly money and expensive jewellery, with the three rappers making their expensive tastes the topic du jour. Speaking about "Poppin", KSI said, "We really just wanted to drop a bunch of cool flows on this [song]... have [us] turn up on here and just have some fun with it." KSI admitted, "[It's] not a super serious song, but that doesn't mean it can't also be a banger."

In his verse, Lil Pump makes references to both the COVID-19 pandemic and the Western African Ebola virus epidemic, with the lyrics, "Look at my wrist, corona / My neck got Ebola". Speaking on Lil Pump's choice of lyrics, KSI recalled, "When I got the verse, I was like, 'Oh my God!'" He continued, "I just burst out laughing when I heard it. I was like, 'Of course Lil Pump did a corona line. Of course.'" KSI said, "[Lil Pump's lyrics] can be wild, but I don't think [that] anyone would find them offensive. I mean, it's Lil Pump. No one's going to be like, 'I can't believe he just said that!' Because it's Lil Pump, it's not really that deep."

== Release and promotion ==
On 18 March 2020, KSI announced via Twitter that he would be releasing a new single in the next week. Shortly after, he posted the song's cover art to his social media pages, revealing that the song is titled "Poppin" and features Lil Pump and Smokepurpp, and the song was made available to pre-order on digital download platforms and pre-save on streaming platforms. The song's cover art depicts the three rappers as cartoon characters, dressed in green clothing and equipped with swords, in front of a blue background. "Poppin" was released for digital download and streaming by RBC Records and BMG on 27 March 2020 as the third single from KSI's upcoming debut studio album. An audio video was released to KSI's YouTube channel on the same day.

On 30 March 2020, KSI announced via social media that he would be hosting a competition called the "Poppin Challenge". He asked fans to record their own verse for "Poppin" and the best verse, decided by a public poll, would replace Lil Pump's verse on a remix of the song on the deluxe edition of the album. KSI reacted to competition entries in two reaction videos, released to YouTube on 4 April and 9 April 2020, respectively. KSI shortlisted his 13 favourite entries for the public poll, which received 854,435 votes. On 17 April 2020, KSI announced that American YouTuber Crypt was the winner of the competition with 235,096 votes. Explaining the decision to host the competition, KSI said, "The fans got me to the point [where] I'm at today. I thought [that the competition] was a good way to give back [to them]."

== Critical reception ==
"Poppin" was met with positive reviews from music critics. In his review for HotNewHipHop, Mitch Findlay called the song "gaudy". He wrote that "Lil Pump sets things off on an energetic note". Findlay continued, "His flow is in fine form, outlandish in its disregard to etiquette yet all the better for it." Findlay praised KSI for "proving himself to be a capable emcee once more" and "boasting the most dexterous flow on the track". Commenting on the choice of featured artists, Finday wrote, "Though one might be tempted to cry out, 'liability', don't underestimate their crafty, albeit base, nature." Anthony Fantano of The Needle Drop similarly admitted that "a feature from [Lil Pump and Smokepurpp] is a bit dated". Fantano observed that their performances are "no where near as raw as [their] SoundCloud [releases] that put [them] on the map", but recognised that "Poppin" has a "similar energy" to them, which KSI "plays off of with his performance on the track pretty well". Fantano further praised KSI for having "a decent sense of what makes for a good song" and concluded that "Poppin" is a "pretty grimy banger with irie production".

Writing for Insider, Kat Tenbarge said that the song has "a relentless beat that could easily accompany a sweaty night at a college pre-game, a nightclub track list, or a viral TikTok dance". The staff of Grungecake called "Poppin" a "bouncy record" and noted that there are "stellar lyrical deliveries from all artists". GRM Daily's Courtney Wynter found that the song "carries a punchy vibe" as a result of the "sharp delivery" from the three artists and Jeremy Randrup of Inlander similarly praised the song's "fast-paced flow and rhyme scheme". Kitty Empire of The Guardian acclaimed that "KSI just about holds his own against [the featured artists]". Writing for i, Nick Duerden remarked that "Poppin" is "a curiously convincing slice of Californian hip hop [for] someone who was born and raised in Watford".

== Music video ==
The music video for "Poppin" was directed by TajvsTaj. It was filmed in Los Angeles in March 2020. A trailer for the music video was released on 1 April 2020. The music video was released to KSI's YouTube channel on 3 April 2020. A behind-the-scenes video of the music video shoot was released to the channel one week later. The music video depicts KSI, Lil Pump and Smokepurpp having a good time in a crowded underground club setting, filled with dancing. Canadian-American actor and internet personality King Bach and Korean-American hip hop dancer Bailey Sok make appearances in the video. Sok's performance received praise from the staff of Grungecake, who called her dancing "incredible" and found that she "intensifies the performance for [the music video]".

== Commercial performance ==
In the United Kingdom, "Poppin" debuted at number 43 on the UK Singles Chart, narrowly missing out on the top 40 of the chart. The song also debuted at number 23 on the UK Hip Hop and R&B Singles Chart. On 10 July 2020, the Official Charts Company reported that "Poppin" was the 23rd best-selling song to not reach the top 40 of the UK Singles Chart of the first half of 2020. In the Republic of Ireland, "Poppin" debuted at number 52 on the Irish Singles Chart, narrowly missing out on the top 50 of the chart.

== Credits and personnel ==
Credits adapted from Tidal.

- KSI – songwriting, vocals
- Lil Pump – songwriting, vocals
- Smokepurpp – songwriting, vocals
- Diego Ave – production, songwriting
- Go Grizzly – production, songwriting
- Mally Mall – production, songwriting
- OG Tint – production
- Mica Levi – songwriting
- Peter Raeburn – songwriting
- Michalis Michael – mixing
- Henkka Niemistö – mastering

== Charts ==
Chart performance for "Poppin"
Chart (2020)	Peak position
Ireland (IRMA)	52
New Zealand Hot Singles (RMNZ)	13
Scotland Singles (OCC)	25
UK Singles (OCC)	43
UK Hip Hop/R&B (OCC)	23
UK Indie (OCC)	4

== Release history ==
Release dates and formats for "Poppin"
Region	Date	Format(s)	Version	Label(s)	Ref.
Various	27 March 2020	Digital download; streaming	Original	RBC; BMG	
Various	30 March 2020	Digital download; streaming	Instrumental	RBC; BMG	
Various	25 May 2020	Digital download; streaming	Remix	RBC; BMG	
