= Wake Up Call (KSI song) =

2020 song by KSI featuring Trippie Redd

Single by KSI featuring Trippie Redd

from the album Dissimulation
- Released: 31 January 2020
- Genre: Pop rap
- Length: 2:55
- Label: RBC; BMG
- Songwriters: Olajide Olatunji; Michael White IV; Sam Gumbley; Mams Taylor; Byron Trice; Jamal Rashid; William Rappaport
- Producers: S-X; Mally Mall

KSI singles chronology
"Down Like That" (2019)	"Wake Up Call" (2020)	"Poppin" (2020)

Trippie Redd singles chronology
"No Service in the Hills" (2020)	"Wake Up Call" (2020)	"Yell Oh" (2020)

Music video
- "Wake Up Call" on YouTube

"Wake Up Call" is a song by British YouTuber and rapper KSI from his debut studio album, Dissimulation (2020). The song features a guest appearance from American rapper and singer Trippie Redd. The song was produced by S-X and Mally Mall. It was released for digital download and streaming by RBC Records and BMG on 31 January 2020 as the second single from the album. A pop-rap track, its lyrics are about how KSI has proven his doubters wrong and how they are finally accepting his success.

"Wake Up Call" received positive reviews from music critics, who commonly praised the song's synth-driven instrumental and Trippie Redd's catchy chorus. The song charted at number 11 in the United Kingdom and further charted in Australia, Canada, Estonia, Hungary, Ireland and the Netherlands. An accompanying music video was released on the same day as the song. The video is a comedy-musical film, presented in the form of satirical behind-the-scenes footage, scene explanations, outtakes and closing credits, which stars KSI and Trippie Redd alongside a dance troupe, all dressed in memorable costumes.

== Background ==
Speaking on collaborating with Trippie Redd, KSI said, "[It was] pretty standard. We asked him to jump on the track. He fucked with it [and] said yes. We linked up [at] the music video [shoot]... that’s when we first met. He’s a cool guy. We [were] chatting away. We said [that] we’ll go to the studio one day." KSI has said that "it made sense to have [Trippie Redd] on the track". KSI explained, "His vocals are very, very different to mine. Mine [are] laid-back and chilled, whereas he’s singing properly. [So] it worked."

== Music and lyrics ==
"Wake Up Call" is a pop-rap track. The instrumental features bright synth pads and moderately mixed drum sequencing and bass rhythms. Trippie Redd performs the chorus in a melodic delivery, while KSI performs the two verses in a controlled flow.

Lyrically, "Wake Up Call" is KSI's message to the doubters that he is still here and proving people wrong. KSI told Apple Music, "This [song] is to let people know that I'm coming for them. It's a wake-up call to let them know [that] I'm doing something with this music thing. It's time to take me seriously... This is just a little warning. I'm coming. There isn't anything [that] anyone can do about it." He continued, "People thought they'd be able to just get rid of me, but I keep popping up and getting in people's faces... All these people want to jump on the bandwagon now [that] they realise [I'm] where it's at."

== Release and promotion ==
On 14 January 2020, KSI revealed during an interview with Vice that he would soon be releasing a new single which will "feature a huge name in American rap". On 25 January 2020, KSI posted the song's cover art to his social media pages, revealing the title as "Wake Up Call" and the featured artist as Trippie Redd, and the song was made available to pre-order on digital download services and pre-save on streaming services. "Wake Up Call" was released for digital download and streaming by RBC Records and BMG on 31 January 2020 as the second single from KSI's upcoming debut studio album.

Shortly after the release of "Wake Up Call", KSI started a TikTok video challenge called the "#WakeUpCallChallenge" to promote the song. KSI watched viewers' TikTok videos in a reaction video released to YouTube on 11 February 2020. TikTok videos using the challenge's hashtag have accumulated over 150 million views. A remix of "Wake Up Call" by producer Yoshi that replaces KSI's two verses from the original version with new verses by KSI, British rapper P Money and British YouTuber TBJZL (credited mononymously as Tobi) was released on 6 March 2020. An accompanying audio video was released to KSI's YouTube channel on the same day. On 13 March 2020, KSI performed "Wake Up Call" during BBC One's fundraising telethon Sport Relief. It was KSI's first-ever televised live music performance. Ahead of the live performance, KSI said, "I want to nail this so [that] I can do more live TV and showcase a YouTuber that is able to go on to mainstream and do TV. It’s nerve-racking, but it’s exciting. I’m hoping that people will see my performance and want to see more of my music."

== Critical reception ==
"Wake Up Call" was met with positive reviews from music critics. In his review for HotNewHipHop, R. Dominiq praised that KSI's verses "[fit] into the pocket of the instrumentation perfectly". Dominiq remarked that "Wake Up Call" is "a testament to the versatility of KSI as an overall entertainer" and concluded that "[KSI]'s now a full-blown emcee with the ability to hang with some of the most prominent rappers of this current generation". Writing for Euphoria, Tom Fogden noted that "Wake Up Call" has a "celebratory tone". He liked Trippie Redd's "melodic" chorus and he called KSI's verses "impactful with their lyrics and well-judged on the beat". Fogden called the beat "the star of the show" and remarked that it "will be stuck in your head for days on end". Fogden positively concluded, "If you hadn't heard of KSI beforehand, you'd assume rap was his full-time vocation". GRM Daily's Courtney Wynter called the song "a playful offering from KSI which he uses to flex" and she praised Trippie Redd's "energetic" chorus and the song's "bouncy instrumental". Writing for Insider, Kat Tenbarge observed that "Wake Up Call" is a "delightfully pop-friendly diversion from [KSI's] icier tracks". Ali Siddique of Dankanator called "Wake Up Call" a "catchy tune" and a "guaranteed hit".

== Music video ==
The music video for "Wake Up Call" was directed by Nayip Ramos and was filmed in Hollywood, Los Angeles. It was released to KSI's YouTube channel on 31 January 2020. A behind-the-scenes video of the music video shoot was uploaded to the channel on 21 February 2020. The music video is a musical film that parodies the Austin Powers film series. The video stars KSI and Trippie Redd alongside a dance troupe, all dressed in memorable costumes. The video is presented in the style of satirical behind-the-scenes footage, scene explanations, outtakes and closing credits.

Speaking about the concept of the video, KSI explained, "It was quite a funny shoot. I was talking with the director to make sure we got the idea right. I was like, 'It would be funny if I was just pissed off [for] the whole shoot... It would just be chaos, but there would be beauty in the chaos.'" Discussing the costumes that he wore in the video, KSI explained, "I didn't even know [that] I was going to be wearing a yellow suit, so it was quite funny, and I thought, 'I look fucking ridiculous.' Even with the fatsuit, I've never worn a fatsuit ever in my life." KSI concluded, "It was quite interesting to see how the video went down and I was very happy with how it ended up." Nayip Ramos said, "[It was o]ne of my most ambitious and ridiculous sets. We laughed so much [filming this video]! [It was a] great time!"

== Commercial performance ==
In the United Kingdom, "Wake Up Call" was the country's second-most downloaded song in its first week of release. It earned the highest new entry on the UK Singles Chart, debuting at number 11, narrowly missing out on the top 10 of the chart, with first-week sales of 29,800 track-equivalent units. The song spent a total of nine weeks on the chart. "Wake Up Call" also debuted at number seven on the UK Hip Hop and R&B Singles Chart. KSI reacted to the commercial success of "Wake Up Call" at the time, tweeting, "This is actually insane. The support has been amazing... I am so grateful to you guys for supporting [me]."

In Ireland, "Wake Up Call" entered the Irish Singles Chart at number 23 and spent a total of six weeks on the chart. Elsewhere in Europe, "Wake Up Call" charted at number 26 on the Hungary Singles Chart, number 36 on the Estonian Singles Chart, and number 29 on the Dutch Single Tip chart. The song also charted at number seven on the Euro Digital Song Sales chart. In Australia, "Wake Up Call" debuted at number 92 on the ARIA Singles Chart. In Canada, the song debuted at number 85 on the Canadian Hot 100.

== Credits and personnel ==
Credits adapted from Tidal.

- KSI – songwriting, vocals
- Trippie Redd – songwriting, vocals
- S-X – production, songwriting
- Mally Mall – production, songwriting
- Mams Taylor – songwriting
- Byron Trice – songwriting
- William Rappaport – songwriting
- Michalis Michael – mixing
- Henkka Niemistö – mastering

== Charts ==
Chart performance for "Wake Up Call"
Chart (2020)	Peak position
Australia (ARIA)	92
Australia Hip Hop/R&B (ARIA)	28
Canada Hot 100 (Billboard)	85
Estonia (Eesti Tipp-40)	36
Euro Digital Song Sales (Billboard)	7
Hungary (Single Top 40)	26
Ireland (IRMA)	23
Netherlands (Single Tip)	29
New Zealand Hot Singles (RMNZ)	3
Scotland Singles (OCC)	3
UK Singles (OCC)	11
UK Hip Hop/R&B (OCC)	7
UK Indie (OCC)	1

== Certifications ==
Certifications for "Wake Up Call"
Region	Certification	Certified units/sales
United Kingdom (BPI)	Silver	200,000^{‡}
^{‡} Sales+streaming figures based on certification alone.

== Release history ==
Release dates and formats for "Wake Up Call"
Region	Date	Format(s)	Version	Label(s)	Ref.
Various	31 January 2020	Digital download; streaming	Original	RBC; BMG	
United Kingdom	7 February 2020	Adult contemporary radio	Original	RBC; BMG	
Various	6 March 2020	Digital download; streaming	Yoshi Remix	RBC; BMG	

== See also ==
- List of UK Independent Singles Chart number ones of 2020
