= Houdini (KSI song) =

2020 song by KSI featuring Swarmz and Tion Wayne

Single by KSI featuring Swarmz and Tion Wayne

from the album Dissimulation
- Released: 24 April 2020
- Genre: UK rap; afroswing
- Length: 2:49
- Label: RBC; BMG
- Songwriter(s): Olajide Olatunji; Brandon Scott; Dennis Odunwo; Ehijie Ohiomoba; Jacob Manson; Emmanuel Isong
- Producer(s): AJ Productions; Jacob Manson

KSI singles chronology
"Poppin" (2020)	"Houdini" (2020)	"Killa Killa" (2020)

Swarmz singles chronology
"Mojo Jojo" (2019)	"Houdini" (2020)	"Freaky" (2020)

Tion Wayne singles chronology
"4AM" (2020)	"Houdini" (2020)	"Moncler" (2020)

Music video
- "Houdini" on YouTube

"Houdini" is a song by British YouTuber and rapper KSI featuring fellow British rappers Swarmz and Tion Wayne from the former's debut studio album, Dissimulation (2020). Produced by AJ Productions and Jacob Manson, the song was released for digital download and streaming by RBC Records and BMG on 24 April 2020 as the fourth single from the album. "Houdini" is a UK rap and afroswing track.

"Houdini" received positive reviews from music critics, who commonly praised Swarmz's catchy chorus. The song charted at number six in the United Kingdom, where it has been certified silver by the British Phonographic Industry (BPI), and further charted in Australia, Estonia and Ireland. An accompanying music video was released on 24 April 2020. The video places the three artists in a studio with overhead blue neon lighting, an expensive car and models.

== Writing and production ==
"Houdini" was co-produced by British record producers AJ Productions and Jacob Manson. Swarmz recorded both a chorus and a verse to the instrumental. He sent the track to KSI, who listened to it but "wasn't too sure about it". After playing it to his girlfriend, who "thought otherwise" and said "it would be a banger", KSI decided to go ahead and work on the track, recording a verse for "Houdini". KSI "wasn't too keen on Swarmz's verse", so he decided to replace it with a verse from another featured artist, resulting in the addition of a verse by Tion Wayne. KSI recalled that when deciding which other artist to feature on the song, the decision was between Tion Wayne or Jay1.

== Release and promotion ==
KSI revealed the song's title, featured artists, cover art and release date on 17 April 2020 via social media, saying, "we about to drop the biggest U.K. banger of 2020". The song was made available for pre-order on the same day. "Houdini" was released for digital download and streaming one week later on 24 April 2020 through American independent record label RBC Records, under BMG Rights Management. The song was premiered exclusively on BBC Radio 1 the night before its release. A lyric video, created by BWGRX, was released to KSI's YouTube channel on 8 May 2020.

A remix of the song by DJ group Pink Panda was released on 23 June 2020. An audio video for the remix was uploaded to KSI's YouTube channel on the same day.

== Critical reception ==
Courtney Wynter of GRM Daily said, ""Houdini" is a polished-sounding single dominated by a fun-filled vibe. Swarmz jumps in first with an infectious hook which is followed by confident lyrics and energetic flows from both KSI and Tion Wayne". Thomas Gillespie of Earmilk said, ""Houdini" is a change of pace from the more American style singles that have come before from KSI. The track is an afro-centric hip-hop club banger that will bar sitting on the charts for weeks to come. UK titans Tion Wayne and Swarmz join KSI on this one and the chemistry is abundant. From the bouncy production and infectious drum pockets to the catchy flows produced by both KSI and Tion Wayne respectively are fantastic. Not to mention, the chorus is by far one of the catchiest and stickiest I have heard in a long time".

=== Year-end lists ===
Year-end lists for "Houdini"
Publication	List	Rank	Ref.
Amazon Music	Best Songs of 2020	43	

== Music video ==
The song's music video was uploaded to KSI's YouTube channel on 24 April 2020. It has received 29 million views. The video was filmed in London in March 2020. The video is directed by Kaylum. The video stars all three artists in a studio with "overhead blue neon lights, an expensive car and models".

== Commercial performance ==
In the United Kingdom, "Houdini" earned the highest new entry on the UK Singles Chart in its first week of release. It debuted at number six, becoming KSI's second song to reach the top 10, and spent a total of 10 weeks on the chart. The song also debuted at number five on the UK Hip Hop and R&B Singles Chart. On 9 July 2020, Music Week reported that "Houdini" was the UK's 49th highest-selling song of the first half of 2020. On 31 July 2020, "Houdini" was certified silver by the British Phonographic Industry (BPI) for track-equivalent sales of 200,000 units in the UK. On 14 September 2020, Music Week reported that "Houdini" has sold 228,569 track-equivalent units in the UK. In Ireland, "Houdini" debuted at number 11 on the Irish Singles Chart and spent a total of nine weeks on the chart. The song debuted at number 10 on the Euro Digital Song Sales chart. KSI reacted to the commercial success of "Houdini" at the time, tweeting, "Thank you everyone for your support. We're consistently breaking boundaries. They're slowly understanding the power of a YouTuber. Too gassed right now!!"

== Credits and personnel ==
Credits adapted from Tidal.

- KSI – songwriting, vocals
- Swarmz – songwriting, vocals
- Tion Wayne – songwriting, vocals
- AJ Productions – production, songwriting
- Jacob Manson – production, songwriting
- Eight9FLY – songwriting
- Michalis Michael – mixing
- Henkka Niemistö – mastering

== Charts ==
Chart performance for "Houdini"
Chart (2020)	Peak position
Australia Hip Hop/R&B (ARIA)	36
Estonia (Eesti Tipp-40)	34
Euro Digital Song Sales (Billboard)	10
Ireland (IRMA)	11
New Zealand Hot Singles (RMNZ)	3
Scotland (OCC)	8
UK Singles (OCC)	6
UK Hip Hop/R&B (OCC)	5
UK Indie (OCC)	1

== Certifications ==
Certifications for "Houdini"
Region	Certification	Certified units/sales
United Kingdom (BPI)	Silver	200,000^{‡}
^{‡} Sales+streaming figures based on certification alone.

== Release history ==
Release dates and formats for "Houdini"
Region	Date	Format(s)	Version	Label(s)	Ref.
Various	24 April 2020	Digital download; streaming	Original	RBC; BMG	
United Kingdom	24 April 2020	Adult contemporary radio	Original	RBC; BMG	
Various	23 June 2020	Digital download; streaming	Pink Panda remix	RBC; BMG	

== See also ==
- List of UK top-ten singles in 2020
- List of UK Independent Singles Chart number ones of 2020
