= Killa Killa =

2020 song by KSI featuring Aiyana-Lee

Single by KSI featuring Aiyana-Lee

from the album Dissimulation
- Released: 17 July 2020
- Genre: Hip hop
- Length: 2:31
- Label: RBC; BMG
- Songwriters: Olajide Olatunji; Diego Avendano; Yoshi Ady; Tiina Vainikainen; William Rappaport
- Producers: Diego Ave; Yoshi

KSI singles chronology
"Houdini" (2020)	"Killa Killa" (2020)	"Lighter" (2020)

Aiyana-Lee singles chronology
"Inside My Sin" (2020)	"Killa Killa" (2020)	"Bedroom" (2021)

Music video
- "Killa Killa" on YouTube

"Killa Killa" (edited for radio as "Thrilla Thrilla") is a song by English YouTuber and rapper KSI from his debut studio album, Dissimulation (2020). The song features a guest appearance from British-American singer Aiyana-Lee. It was produced by Diego Ave and Yoshi. The song was released for digital download and streaming by RBC Records and BMG on 22 May 2020 and was later released as the fifth single from the album on 17 July 2020. "Killa Killa" is an upbeat hip hop track with caribbean and afrobeat influences. The song's lyrics are about KSI's success in his YouTube, music and boxing careers and how he is not to be messed with.

"Killa Killa" received positive reviews from music critics, who commonly praised Aiyana-Lee's catchy chorus and KSI's playful and confident verses. The song charted at number 27 in the United Kingdom and number 33 in Ireland. An accompanying music video was released on 17 July 2020. The video stars the two artists as criminals who commit a heist.

== Music and lyrics ==
"Killa Killa"
An 18-second sample of the chorus, performed by Aiyana-Lee, over a caribbean and afrobeat inspired instrumental.

"Killa Killa" is an upbeat hip hop track with Caribbean and afrobeat influences. Aiyana-Lee sings the chorus, while KSI raps two verses. The song's lyrics are about how KSI is killing the game in more ways than one and when he puts his mind to something, he normally succeeds. This song is a reminder that KSI quickly evolved from a YouTube sensation, to a boxing champion, to a bonafide, respected music artist. Speaking about "Killa Killa", KSI said, "This track is straight KSI! I'm like, 'Yo. I'm here killing everything that I'm doing. I'm killing music, boxing, YouTube. I'm killing all of that.' It's a track to show that I'm not to be messed with." Speaking on Aiyana-Lee's contribution to the track, KSI remarked, "She's a wild one. She came with exactly what I needed for the chorus."

== Release and promotion ==
"Killa Killa" was released for digital download and streaming by RBC Records and BMG on 22 May 2020. A lyric video for "Killa Killa" was released to KSI's YouTube channel on 3 July 2020. On 17 July 2020, "Killa Killa" was released as the fifth single from KSI's debut studio album, Dissimulation (2020). On the same day, a censored version of the song was serviced to adult contemporary radio in the United Kingdom, under the name "Thrilla Thrilla". The single's cover art depicts KSI and Aiyana-Lee as cartoon characters, dressed in black clothing, in front of a black and red background.

== Critical reception ==
"Killa Killa" was met with positive reviews from music critics. In her review of Dissimulation for The Guardian, Kitty Empire called "Killa Killa" a "hit-in-waiting". GRM Daily's Courtney Wynter called "Killa Killa" an "upbeat track with a fun energy". Wynter liked how "KSI creates a playful vibe, flexing during his verses" and she praised Aiyana-Lee's "catchy chorus". Sarah Akomanyi of Link Up TV remarked that "KSI's confidence is hard to miss through [the song], which makes for clear and consistent verses". Akomanyi proclaimed, "A track like this is bound to go off when it comes to live shows."

== Music video ==
The music video for "Killa Killa" was co-directed by Troy Roscoe and Nayip Ramos. It premiered on KSI's YouTube channel on 17 July 2020 at 15:00 UTC. The music video stars KSI and Aiyana-Lee as a pair of criminals who commit a heist. The video's plot is continued in the music video for KSI's song "Domain" (2020), later released on 25 December 2020.

== Commercial performance ==
In the United Kingdom, "Killa Killa" debuted at number 27 on the UK Singles Chart and number 15 on the UK Hip Hop and R&B Singles Chart, with first week sales of 15,853 track-equivalent units. The song spent the next three weeks on the UK Singles Chart at positions 80, 89 and 82, before dropping out of the chart. Three weeks later, the song re-entered the chart at number 79 following the release of the song's lyric video, before dropping out and then re-entering again the following week at number 64 following the release of the song's music video. In Ireland, "Killa Killa" debuted at number 33 on the Irish Singles Chart and spent two weeks on the chart.

== Credits and personnel ==
Credits adapted from Genius and Tidal.

- KSI – songwriting, vocals
- Aiyana-Lee – vocals
- Diego Ave – production, songwriting
- Yoshi – production, songwriting
- Tiina Vainikainen – songwriting
- William Rappaport – songwriting
- Michalis Michael – mixing
- Henkka Niemistö – mastering
- JustAGhost – cover art, lyrics video

== Charts ==
Chart performance for "Killa Killa"
Chart (2020)	Peak position
Ireland (IRMA)	33
New Zealand Hot Singles (RMNZ)	12
UK Singles (OCC)	27
UK Hip Hop/R&B (OCC)	15
UK Indie (OCC)	5

== Release history ==
Release dates and formats for "Killa Killa"
Region	Date	Format(s)	Label(s)	Ref.
Various	22 May 2020	Digital download; streaming	RBC; BMG	
United Kingdom	17 July 2020	Adult contemporary radio	RBC; BMG	
