= Domain (KSI song) =

2020 song by KSI

Song by KSI

from the album Dissimulation
- Released: 22 May 2020
- Genre: Hip hop
- Length: 3:00
- Label: RBC; BMG
- Songwriters: Olajide Olatunji; Sam Gumbley
- Producer: S-X

Music video
- "Domain" on YouTube

"Domain" is a song by British YouTuber and rapper KSI from his debut studio album, Dissimulation (2020). The song was released for digital download and streaming by RBC Records and BMG on 22 May 2020. A powerful and pumped-up hip hop track, its lyrics are about KSI's dominance over the YouTube platform. An accompanying music video was released on 25 December 2020. The video is an action film that features a fast-paced fight sequence.

== Writing and production ==
The instrumental was produced by British singer and record producer S-X. He played the instrumental to KSI, who "became obsessed with it". KSI wrote and recorded a chorus and two verses for the song at the beginning of 2019. KSI recalled, "The beat was actually meant for [British rapper] Ghetts. I think it was sent to Ghetts and either he didn't want it or he just ignored it."

== Music and lyrics ==
"Domain"
A 14-second sample of the chorus, performed by KSI with a powerful and pumped-up delivery.

"Domain" is a powerful and pumped-up hip hop track. KSI described "Domain" as a "hybrid of rap, grime and rock". He said, "It's just so powerful. I know [that] whenever I perform this track [live], it's going to go off... It's going to do a madness." The song's lyrics are about KSI's dominance over the YouTube platform. KSI called "Domain" a "YouTube song". He explained, "This [song] is major KSI... [It] really, really show[s] my dominance." KSI said, "I wanted to make a song to show that I’m on a different level when it comes to wordplay." He continued, "I know [that] I killed that song; lyrically; the bars; the flow." KSI has stated that "Domain" is his favourite track from his debut studio album, Dissimulation (2020). He called "Domain" his "fucking jam" and said that he has "been raving about [the song]" since he recorded it."

== Commercial performance ==
In the United Kingdom, "Domain" was excluded from the week's published UK Singles Chart under Official Charts Company rules, along with six other tracks from Dissimulation. "Domain" debuted at number 38 on the UK Audio Streaming Chart and number 28 on the UK Hip Hop and R&B Singles Chart.

== Music video ==
On 12 September 2020, KSI tweeted, "Next Friday, I’m gonna drop the best music video I’ve ever done. The best music video any YouTuber has ever done. And possibly the best music video in the world this year." On 15 September 2020, KSI posted a trailer for the music video for "Domain" to his social media pages and announced that the music video would be released on 18 September 2020. However, one day before its scheduled release, KSI decided to postpone the release of the music video, tweeting, "No video this Friday. Sorry I got you hyped up for nothing. The 'Domain' video can’t drop for many reasons." On 27 November 2020, KSI announced that the music video would be released on Christmas Day, calling it "the best [and] most unexpected Christmas present [for his fans]".

The music video was co-directed by Konstantin and Guy Davies. It was released to KSI's YouTube channel on 25 December 2020 at 11:00 UTC. The music video is an action film that features an insanely fast-paced and action-packed fight sequence which will keep you gripped throughout. It is a sequel to the music video for KSI's song "Killa Killa" (2020), which was previously released on 17 July 2020. Before the music video shoot, KSI spent three days in a studio, learning the fight choreography. The shoot itself spanned over two days. A behind-the-scenes video of the music video shoot was released to Konstantin's YouTube channel on 13 January 2021.

== Credits and personnel ==
Credits adapted from Tidal.

- KSI – songwriting, vocals
- S-X – production, songwriting
- Michalis Michael – mixing
- Henkka Niemistö – mastering

== Charts ==
Chart performance for "Domain"
| Chart (2020) | Peak position |
|---|---|
| UK Audio Streaming (OCC) | 38 |
| UK Hip Hop/R&B (OCC) | 28 |
| UK Indie (OCC) | 11 |

== Release history ==
Release dates and formats for "Domain"
| Region | Date | Format(s) | Label(s) | Ref. |
|---|---|---|---|---|
| Various | 22 May 2020 | Digital download; streaming | RBC; BMG | |
