= Dissimulation (KSI album) =

2020 studio album by KSI

Studio album by KSI
- Released: 22 May 2020
- Genres: British hip-hop; trap
- Length: 33:54
- Labels: RBC; BMG
- Producers: Go Grizzly; Gitty; OG Tint; AJ; Jacob Manson; Dro; Shanti; Some Randoms; Westen Weiss; Blake Slatkin; Yoshi; Super Brick; BlueySport; JG; Menace; Smash David; Swish; Paul Magnet; Memorais

KSI chronology
New Age (2019)	Dissimulation (2020)	All Over the Place (2021)

Singles from Dissimulation
- 1. "Down Like That" Released: 8 November 2019; 2. "Wake Up Call" Released: 31 January 2020; 3. "Poppin" Released: 27 March 2020; 4. "Houdini" Released: 24 April 2020; 5. "Killa Killa" Released: 17 July 2020

Deluxe edition cover

Dissimulation is the debut studio album by British influencer, boxer, and musician KSI. It was released by RBC Records and BMG on 22 May 2020, and a deluxe edition of the album was released three days later. The album features guest appearances from Offset, Lil Pump, Smokepurpp, Swarmz, Tion Wayne, Jeremih, Trippie Redd, Aiyana-Lee, Rick Ross, Lil Baby and S-X. The deluxe edition of the album features further guest appearances from AJ Tracey, Rich the Kid, Randolph and Crypt.

Dissimulation was preceded by four singles. "Down Like That", featuring Rick Ross, Lil Baby and S-X, was released on 8 November 2019 as the album's lead single and it peaked at number 10 on the UK Singles Chart. "Wake Up Call", featuring Trippie Redd, was released on 31 January 2020 as the second single and it debuted at number 11 on the UK Singles Chart. "Poppin", featuring Lil Pump and Smokepurpp, was released on 27 March 2020 as the third single. "Houdini", featuring Swarmz and Tion Wayne, was released on 24 April 2020 as the fourth single from the album and it debuted at number six on the UK Singles Chart. Following the release of Dissimulation, "Killa Killa", featuring Aiyana-Lee, was released as the album's fifth single on 17 July 2020. It had previously peaked at number 27 on the UK Singles Chart.

Dissimulation received mostly positive reviews from music critics. Many critics praised KSI's growth from his previous music releases and commended the album's credibility, recognising that KSI had achieved making a genuine rap album. Critics concluded that Dissimulation "marks a serious leap forward for KSI" and remarked that the album has "cemented him his place as a force to be reckoned within the music industry". Dissimulation debuted at number two on the UK Albums Chart and it further entered the albums charts of 16 other countries. Dissimulation was the UK's highest-selling debut album by a British artist and the fourth highest-selling album by a British rap artist in 2020. The album has been certified gold by the British Phonographic Industry (BPI) for exceeding sales of 100,000 units in the UK.

== Background and recording ==
On 4 November 2019, it was announced that KSI had signed with RBC Records and BMG to "take [his] music to the next level" and "further develop his music career in the US and internationally". In addition to managing KSI's future releases, it was confirmed that RBC Records and BMG would be administering and reissuing KSI's independent catalogue recordings. That day, it was confirmed that KSI had already started recording his debut studio album. On 5 April 2020, KSI confirmed that recording for the album had been completed by tweeting, "Album done".

== Concept ==
Speaking to Metro about the album in February 2020, KSI "explained that the album is split into two halves". He said, "there's KSI and JJ, KSI's what you see online, JJ's a lot more personal. I kind of wanted to show both sides of that. The first half is definitely KSI, big bravado, I'm popping, I'm sick, I'm undefeated, I'm always winning, blah blah blah. And then halfway through there's "Wake Up Call", and that's when it changes, as if I've woken up from what you see online and I realise it's me and I show a bit more about my personal side – the things I don't like talking too much about publicly. I do it through song, that's a really good way for me to portray that part of me". Regarding the title of the album, KSI said, “I felt dissimulation – concealment of one's thoughts or feelings – was the perfect name for the album. I conceal a lot when it comes to personal things in my life. I also wanted to try and portray the difference between KSI and JJ in my music". Speaking about his aspirations for the album, KSI said, "I hope this album empowers people and allows them to believe in themselves and conquer any obstacle in their way, no matter the circumstances. I hope this will silence a lot of skeptics. I’ve been doing music for over 10 years and constantly show growth. Hopefully they see that too".

== Music and lyrics ==
Kitty Empire of The Guardian highlighted that while KSI's previous releases were grime influenced and featured British rappers, Dissimulation has many American hip-hop features. Empire continued that the only "London vibes" on the album are the afroswing song "Houdini" and the Caribbean influenced "Killa Killa".

Metro noted that "KSI isn't afraid to shout about his success in the new album". The album's opening song, "What You Been On", has been called "a boastful track for those who have doubted the rapper to date", with Clash describing it as "a boastful track hitting out at the much-maligned internet personalities critics". KSI told Music Week, ""What You Been On" is a braggadocious track to let people know that I am doing bits. I'm turning the question back on the haters and the people that were doubting me". "Wake Up Call" is said to be "KSI's message to the doubters that he is still here and proving people wrong", and "Cap" "addresses those that deceived him" and talks about "how he always bounces back". "Killa Killa" is said to be "the track that shows how KSI is killing the game in more ways than one. When he puts his mind to something, he normally succeeds. This song is a reminder that he quickly evolved from YouTube sensation, to boxing champion, to a bonafide, respected artist". "Domain” has been described as "a powerful track" that "proves he owns this hybrid space". KSI told Music Week, ""Domain" is more of a YouTube song". He continued, "I wanted to make a song to show that I’m on a different level when it comes to wordplay". "Undefeated" talks about how KSI "will remain triumphant, even as the underdog".

On the other hand, "we see an intimate side of KSI for the first time in 'Bad Lil Vibe'". Metro said that "Millions" "sees KSI open up about his mental health, with some brutally emotional lyrics", and HITC said that the song "shows the darker side of show business, with the hook of the song explaining that despite his wealth, KSI still struggles with things". The first verse of "Millions" is said to address KSI's relationship with his younger brother, Deji Olatunji, and "Complicated", from the deluxe edition of the album, also sees KSI "address his relationship with his family, including his strained relationship with his brother". The second verse of "Millions" is said to be "about KSI's girlfriend", and "How It Feel" is said to be "dedicated to his long-term girlfriend, showing how much he appreciates her".

== Release ==
KSI revealed the album's title, Dissimulation, on 17 April 2020 during one of his YouTube videos. On 1 May 2020, the album's cover art, track listing and release date were revealed alongside the release of a promotional video trailer for the album. That day, the album was made available to pre-order on digital download platforms and pre-save on streaming platforms. The album's cover art was shot by photographer Nathan James. Two days before the album's release, on 20 May 2020, KSI hosted an exclusive online album preview party. Dissimulation was released on 22 May 2020 by RBC Records and BMG. The deluxe edition of Dissimulation was released for digital download and streaming three days later on 25 May 2020 and CD on 26 May 2020.

== Promotion ==
=== Singles ===
"Down Like That", featuring American rappers Rick Ross and Lil Baby and British singer-songwriter and record producer S-X, was released as the album's lead single on 8 November 2019. The day after its release, on 9 November, the song was performed live by the three featured artists as KSI's ring walk song for his boxing rematch against American YouTuber Logan Paul, held at the Staples Center in Los Angeles. The song's music video was released on 22 November 2019. The video places the four artists in a dystopian and apocalyptic setting, amongst motorcycles, burned out cars and bright-orange trash can fires. "Down Like That" charted at number 10 in the United Kingdom, where it has been certified silver by the British Phonographic Industry (BPI).

"Wake Up Call", featuring American rapper and singer Trippie Redd, was released as the album's second single on 31 January 2020 alongside an accompanying music video. The video is a comedy-musical film, which stars the two artists and a dance troupe, all dressed in memorable costumes. "Wake Up Call" charted at number 11 in the United Kingdom.

"Poppin", featuring American rappers Lil Pump and Smokepurpp, was released as the album's third single on 27 March 2020. The song's music video was released on 4 April 2020. The video places the three rappers in an underground club setting, filled with dancing.

"Houdini", featuring British artists Swarmz and Tion Wayne, was released as the album's fourth single on 24 April 2020 alongside an accompanying music video. The video places the three rappers in a studio with overhead blue neon lights, an expensive car and models. "Houdini" charted at number six in the United Kingdom, where it has been certified silver by the BPI.

"Killa Killa", featuring British-American singer Aiyana-Lee, was released as a single on 17 July 2020 alongside an accompanying music video. The video depicts the two artists as criminals who commit a heist.

=== Other songs ===
A music video for "Cap", featuring American rapper and Migos member Offset, was released on the same day as Dissimulation. The black and white video places the two rappers in a warehouse, filled with candles. "Cap" charted at number 24 in the United Kingdom and it also reached the singles charts of Ireland, Greece and Lithuania.

A music video for "Domain" was released on 25 December 2020.

== Critical reception ==
Professional ratings
Review scores
Source	Rating
Clash	7/10
DriveTribe	3/5 stars
The Guardian	3/5 stars
Hip Hop Hopscotch	6.5/10
The News International	7/10
RapReviews	6/10
PeanutButterPope	4/10

Dissimulation was met with mostly positive reviews from music critics. Writing for Clash, Amar Mehta felt that while areas of Dissimulation are "lifted by the heavy weight features, some might be shocked by KSI's ability on the mic". Mehta called the album a "credible rap record" and positively concluded that "for a first album and for someone who hasn't yet made a mark on the music scene, Dissimulation is an excellent body of work", awarding the album a rating of seven out of 10. Kitty Empire of The Guardian recognised that KSI had achieved making a genuine rap album, rather than a "YouTube rap" album, awarding the album a rating of three stars out of five. The News International's Kathy Iffly wrote that KSI has done a good job at "[proving] the naysayers wrong" and remarked that Dissimulation has "cemented him his place as a force to be reckoned within the music world", awarding the album a rating of seven out of 10. Luke Morgan Britton of NME called Dissimulation a "disparate-sounding album that still somehow manages to make sense" and highlighted that "the growth on Dissimulation is plain to hear". Jeremey Randrup of Inlander wrote, "Dissimulation is an album that flexes KSI’s range as a musical artist... [and] is proof that KSI has grown as an artist, adding much more depth to his lyrics as well as expertise in how he executes the different rap styles." Randrup continued, "[KSI's] flow and cadence are much better, and he’s meshing nicely with all of the different artists that are featured." Randrup positively concluded that "Dissimulation marks a serious leap forward for [KSI]". Marwar Hamad of Gulf News called Dissimulation "sonically diverse and lyrically tight" and observed that KSI has "evolved his antagonising flow to a new degree, showcasing his own growth and confidence". Hamad concluded that Dissimulation is "a massive step forward for [KSI's] credibility".

== Commercial performance ==
In the United Kingdom, Dissimulation debuted at number two on the UK Albums Chart, with first week sales of 27,472 album-equivalent units, out of which 6,340 came from digital downloads, 19,332 came from streaming-equivalent sales and 1,800 came from CDs that were released mid-week, making the album both the most digitally downloaded and the most streamed album of the week in the UK. The album spent a total of 17 weeks on the UK Albums Chart. Dissimulation topped both the UK Hip Hop and R&B Albums Chart and the UK Independent Albums Chart. On 31 July 2020, Dissimulation was certified silver by the British Phonographic Industry (BPI) for sales of 60,000 album-equivalent units in the UK. Dissimulation was the UK's 62nd highest-selling album in 2020, as well as the country's highest-selling debut album by a British artist and the fourth highest-selling album by a British rap artist in 2020. On 23 July 2021, Music Week reported that 98,978 units of Dissimulation have been sold in the UK.

In Ireland, Dissimulation debuted at number one on the Irish Albums Chart and spent a total of 12 weeks on the chart. The album was Ireland's second highest-selling debut album of 2020. Dissimulation also reached the album charts of 11 other European countries: Austria, Belgium, Denmark, Estonia, Finland, Iceland, Lithuania, the Netherlands, Norway, Sweden, and Switzerland. In the United States, Dissimulation debuted at number 149 on the Billboard 200 chart and it topped the Billboard Heatseekers Albums Chart. In Canada, the album debuted at number 33 on the Canadian Albums Chart. Dissimulation further debuted at number four on the Australian Albums Chart and number three on the New Zealand Albums Chart. On 8 April 2021, Forbes reported that Dissimulation has received over one billion global streams.

== Track listing ==
Standard edition
No.	Title	Writer(s)	Producer(s)	Length
1.	"What You Been On"	Olajide Olatunji; Diego Avendano; Jeff Gitelman; Ivory Scott	Diego Ave; Gitty	1:59
2.	"Cap" (featuring Offset)	Olatunji; Kiari Cephus; Avendano; Kevin Price; Jamal Rashid; Scott	Diego Ave; Go Grizzly; Mally Mall	3:11
3.	"Poppin" (featuring Lil Pump and Smokepurpp)	Olatunji; Gazzy Garcia; Omar Pineiro; Avendano; Price; Rashid	Diego Ave; Go Grizzly; Mally Mall; OG Tint	3:33
4.	"Houdini" (featuring Swarmz and Tion Wayne)	Olatunji; Brandon Scott; Dennis Odunwo; Ehijie Ohiomoba; Jacob Manson; Emmanuel Isong	AJ; Jacob Manson	2:48
5.	"Bad Lil Vibe" (featuring Jeremih)	Olatunji; Jeremy Felton; Avendano; Leandro Hidalgo; Ryan Murray; Rashid; Scott; Mams Taylor	Diego Ave; Dro; Shanti; Mally Mall	2:17
6.	"How It Feel"	Olatunji; Avendano; Matt Campfield; Danny Klein; Westen Weiss; Blake Slatkin; Scott	Diego Ave; Some Randoms; Westen Weiss; Blake Slatkin	2:37
7.	"Wake Up Call" (featuring Trippie Redd)	Olatunji; Michael White IV; Sam Gumbley; Rashid; Taylor; Byron Trice; William Rappaport	S-X; Mally Mall	2:55
8.	"Killa Killa" (featuring Aiyana-Lee)	Olatunji; Avendano; Yoshiya Ady; Tiina Vainikainen; Rappaport	Diego Ave; Yoshi	2:31
9.	"Domain"	Olatunji; Gumbley	S-X	3:00
10.	"Down Like That" (featuring Rick Ross, Lil Baby and S-X)	Olatunji; William Roberts II; Dominique Jones; Gumbley; Trice	S-X	2:55
11.	"Undefeated"	Olatunji; Avendano; Justin Howze	Diego Ave; Super Brick	2:55
12.	"Millions"	Olatunji; Ady; Alexander Krashinsky; Jonathan Gabor	Yoshi; BlueySport; JG	3:13
Total length:				33:54

Deluxe edition
No.	Title	Writer(s)	Producer(s)	Length
13.	"Complicated"	Olatunji; Gumbley; Adnan Khan; Samuel Jimenez	S-X; Menace; Smash David	2:43
14.	"Tides" (featuring AJ Tracey and Rich the Kid)	Olatunji; Ché Grant; Dimitri Roger; Avendano; Samuel Ahana; Rashid; Paul Magnet; Scott	Diego Ave; Swish; Mally Mall; Paul Magnet; Memorais	3:23
15.	"Night To Remember" (featuring Randolph and S-X)	Olatunji; Andrew Shane; Gumbley	S-X	2:59
16.	"Poppin (Remix)" (featuring Smokepurpp and Crypt)	Olatunji; Pineiro; Cordell Glass; Avendano; Price; Rashid	Diego Ave; Go Grizzly; Mally Mall; OG Tint	3:19
Total length:				46:18

== Credits and personnel ==
Credits adapted from Tidal.

- KSI – vocals (all tracks), songwriting (all tracks)
- Michalis Michael – mixing (all tracks)
- Henkka Niemistö – mastering (all tracks)
- Diego Ave – production (1–3, 5, 6, 8, 11, 14), songwriting (1–3, 5, 6, 8, 11, 14)
- Gitty – production (1), songwriting (1)
- Ivory Scott – songwriting (1, 2, 5, 6, 14)
- Offset – vocals (2), songwriting (2)
- Mally Mall – production (2, 3, 5, 7, 14), songwriting (2, 3, 5, 7, 14)
- Go Grizzly – production (2, 3), songwriting (2, 3)
- Lil Pump – vocals (3), songwriting (3)
- Smokepurpp – vocals (3), songwriting (3)
- OG Tint – production (3)
- Swarmz – vocals (4), songwriting (4)
- Tion Wayne – vocals (4), songwriting (4)
- AJ – production (4), songwriting (4)
- Jacob Manson – production (4), songwriting (4)
- Eight9FLY – songwriting (4)
- Jeremih – vocals (5), songwriting (5)
- Dro – production (5), songwriting (5)
- Shanti – production (5)
- Mams Taylor – songwriting (5, 7)
- Some Randoms – production (6), songwriting (6)
- Westen Weiss – production (6), songwriting (6)
- Blake Slatkin – production (6), songwriting (6)
- Trippie Redd – vocals (7), songwriting (7)
- S-X – production (7, 9, 10, 13, 15), songwriting (7, 9, 10, 13, 15), vocals (10, 15)
- Byron Trice – songwriting (7, 10)
- William Rappaport – songwriting (7, 8)
- Aiyana-Lee – vocals (8)
- Tiina Vainikainen – songwriting (8)
- Yoshi – production (8, 12), songwriting (8, 12)
- Rick Ross – vocals (10), songwriting (10)
- Lil Baby – vocals (10), songwriting (10)
- Super Brick – production (11), songwriting (11)
- BlueySport – production (12), songwriting (12)
- JG – production (12), songwriting (12)
- Menace – production (13), songwriting (13)
- Smash David – production, songwriting (13)
- AJ Tracey – vocals (14), songwriting (14)
- Rich the Kid – vocals (14), songwriting (14)
- Swish – production (14), songwriting (14)
- Paul Magnet – production (14), songwriting (14)
- Memorais – production (14)
- Randolph – vocals (15), songwriting (15)
- Crypt – vocals (16), songwriting (16)

== Charts ==
=== Weekly charts ===
Weekly chart performance for Dissimulation
Chart (2020)	Peak position
Australian Albums (ARIA)	4
Austrian Albums (Ö3 Austria)	47
Belgian Albums (Ultratop Flanders)	9
Canadian Albums (Billboard)	33
Danish Albums (Hitlisten)	9
Dutch Albums (Album Top 100)	14
Estonian Albums (Eesti Tipp-40)	2
Finnish Albums (Suomen virallinen lista)	17
Icelandic Albums (Tónlistinn)	4
Irish Albums (Official Charts)	1
Lithuanian Albums (AGATA)	5
New Zealand Albums (RMNZ)	3
Norwegian Albums (VG-lista)	3
Scottish Albums (Official Charts)	2
Swedish Albums (Sverigetopplistan)	15
Swiss Albums (Schweizer Hitparade)	38
UK Albums (Official Charts)	2
UK R&B Albums (Official Charts)	1
UK Independent Albums (Official Charts)	1
US Billboard 200	149
US Heatseekers Albums (Billboard)	1
US Independent Albums (Billboard)	17

=== Year-end charts ===
2020 year-end chart performance for Dissimulation
Chart (2020)	Position
UK Albums (OCC)	62

== Certifications ==
Certifications for Dissimulation
Region	Certification	Certified units/sales
United Kingdom (BPI)	Gold	100,000^{‡}
^{‡} Sales+streaming figures based on certification alone.

== Release history ==
Release dates and formats for Dissimulation
Region	Date	Format(s)	Edition	Label	Ref.
Various	22 May 2020	Digital download; streaming	Standard	RBC; BMG	
Various	25 May 2020	Digital download; streaming	Deluxe	RBC; BMG	
Various	26 May 2020	CD	Deluxe	RBC; BMG	

== See also ==
- List of UK top-ten albums in 2020
- List of UK Album Downloads Chart number ones of the 2020s
- List of Official Albums Streaming Chart number ones of 2020
- List of UK R&B Albums Chart number ones of 2020
- List of UK Independent Albums Chart number ones of 2020
- List of number-one albums of 2020 (Ireland)
