= Put Your Hands Up in the Air! =

2005 song performed by Danzel

"Put Your Hands Up"

Single by The Black & White Brothers
- Released: 10 July 1998
- Length: 3:40
- Label: Warner
- Songwriter: Djaimin
- Producers: Djaimin; Mr. Mike

The Black & White Brothers singles chronology
"Put Your Hands Up" (1998)	""Pump It Up!"" (1998)

"Put Your Hands Up" is a song recorded by Swiss electronic duo the Black & White Brothers. It was released in July 1998 as a single and charted throughout Europe.

== Track listing ==
- Belgium CD maxi-single
1. "Put Your Hands Up" (radio mix) - 3:40
2. "Pump It Up!" (Couleur 3 Legendary Show Tribute) - 1:29
3. "Your Love" (98 Edit Mix) - 5:44
4. "Put Your Hands Up" (Pump It Up Anthem Mix) - 5:56
5. "Open The Door" (Djaimin N-Joey Remix) - 4:50

== Charts ==
=== Peak positions ===
Chart (1998-1999)	Peak position
Australia (ARIA)	34
Belgium (Ultratop 50 Flanders)	27
France (SNEP)	19
Germany (GfK)	40
Ireland (IRMA)	19
Netherlands (Single Top 100)	20
Switzerland (Schweizer Hitparade)	24
UK Singles (Official Charts)	87
UK Dance (Official Charts)	15

== Danzel version ==
"Put Your Hands Up in the Air!"

Single by Danzel
- Released: 28 August 2005
- Length: 3:31
- Label: Superstar Recordings (Germany); Big Star Records (Denmark); Data Records (US); Tanga Records (Spain); Universal Licensing Music (France)
- Songwriters: Michael Hall, Dario Mancini, Johan Waem, Bert Boon

Danzel singles chronology
"Pump It Up!" (2004)	"Put Your Hands Up in the Air!" (2005)	"My Arms Keep Missing You" (2006)

The song was remixed as "Put Your Hands Up in the Air!" by Belgian dance artist Danzel and released in August 2005 as a single. It charted in many countries throughout Europe.

=== Track listing ===
- Belgium CD maxi-single
1. "Put Your Hands Up in the Air!" - 6:17
2. "Put Your Hands Up in the Air!" (radio edit) - 3:31
3. "Put Your Hands Up in the Air!" (extended mix) - 7:42
4. "Dance Hostess" - 3:06

=== Charts ===
==== Peak positions ====
Chart (2005)	Peak position
Austria (Ö3 Austria Top 40)	56
Belgium (Ultratop 50 Flanders)	34
Belgium (Ultratip Bubbling Under Wallonia)	2
Denmark (Tracklisten)	14
France (SNEP)	40
Germany (GfK)	52
Netherlands (Single Top 100)	77
Switzerland (Schweizer Hitparade)	74
