= Everything Changes in the End =

Studio album by Vistas
- Released: 29 May 2020
- Length: 41:59
- Label: Retrospect Records

Vistas chronology
| Hello (2019) | Everything Changes in the End (2020) | What Were You Hoping to Find? (2021) |

Singles from Everything Changes in the End
- 1. "Teenage Blues" Released: 26 November 2019; 2. "Sucker" Released: 14 January 2020

Everything Changes in the End is the debut studio album by the Scottish alternative indie rock band Vistas. It was released on 29 May 2020 by Retrospect Records. The album includes the singles "Teenage Blues" and "Sucker".

== Critical reception ==
Ali Shutler of NME gave the album three out of five stars, saying "Everything Changes in the End is definitely full of bangers but Vistas' love of a boozy chorus – their desire to keep everything at full throttle – means that their personalities never shine through. It's a satisfying indie album but as a debut record, it doesn't really give much away about the band."

== Commercial performance ==
On 5 June 2020, Everything Changes in the End debuted at number two on the Scottish Albums Charts, behind Lady Gaga's Chromatica. The album also debuted at number twenty-one on the UK Albums Charts.

== Singles ==
"Teenage Blues" was released as the lead single from the album on 26 November 2019. "Sucker" was released as the second single from the album on 14 January 2020.

== Track listing ==
| No. | Title | Length |
|---|---|---|
| 1. | "Intro" | 0:50 |
| 2. | "Everything Changes in the End" | 3:17 |
| 3. | "Teenage Blues" | 2:38 |
| 4. | "15 Years" | 2:49 |
| 5. | "Sucker" | 3:36 |
| 6. | "Summer" | 4:03 |
| 7. | "Tigerblood" | 3:22 |
| 8. | "The Love You Give" | 3:00 |
| 9. | "Shout" | 2:35 |
| 10. | "You and Me" | 2:21 |
| 11. | "Sentimental" | 3:51 |
| 12. | "Retrospect" | 3:26 |
| 13. | "November" | 5:47 |
| Total length: | | 41:59 |

== Charts ==
| Chart (2020) | Peak position |
|---|---|
| Scottish Albums (OCC) | 2 |
| UK Albums (OCC) | 21 |

== Release history ==
| Region | Date | Format | Label |
|---|---|---|---|
| United Kingdom | 29 May 2020 | Digital download; streaming | Retrospect Records |
