= List of UK R&B Singles Chart number ones of 2020 =

The logo of the Official Charts Company, responsible for compiling all of the official music charts in the United Kingdom, including the R&B singles chart.

The UK R&B Singles Chart is a weekly chart that ranks the 40 biggest-selling singles and albums that are classified in the R&B genre in the United Kingdom. The chart is compiled by the Official Charts Company, and is based on both physical, and digital sales.

The following are the songs which have topped the UK R&B Singles Chart in 2020.

== Number-one singles ==
Chart date (week ending)	Song	Artist(s)	Record label	References
2 January ^{[b]}	"Own It"	Stormzy, Ed Sheeran and Burna Boy	Atlantic/Merky	
9 January ^{[a]}	"Own It"	Stormzy, Ed Sheeran and Burna Boy	Atlantic/Merky	
16 January ^{[a]} ^{[b]}	"Own It"	Stormzy, Ed Sheeran and Burna Boy	Atlantic/Merky	
23 January ^{[a]}	"Own It"	Stormzy, Ed Sheeran and Burna Boy	Atlantic/Merky	
30 January ^{[a]} ^{[b]}	"Godzilla"	Eminem featuring Juice Wrld	Interscope	
6 February	"Blinding Lights"	The Weeknd	Republic	
13 February ^{[a]}	"Blinding Lights"	The Weeknd	Republic	
20 February ^{[a]}	"Blinding Lights"	The Weeknd	Republic	
27 February	"Blinding Lights"	The Weeknd	Republic	
5 March ^{[a]}	"Blinding Lights"	The Weeknd	Republic	
12 March ^{[a]}	"Blinding Lights"	The Weeknd	Republic	
19 March ^{[a]}	"Blinding Lights"	The Weeknd	Republic	
26 March ^{[a]}	"Roses"	Saint Jhn	B1/Ministry of Sound	
2 April ^{[b]}	"Blinding Lights"	The Weeknd	Republic	
9 April ^{[a]}	"Blinding Lights"	The Weeknd	Republic	
16 April ^{[a]} ^{[b]}	"Blinding Lights"	The Weeknd	Republic	
23 April ^{[a]} ^{[b]}	"Blinding Lights"	The Weeknd	Republic	
30 April ^{[b]}	"Blinding Lights"	The Weeknd	Republic	
7 May	"Blinding Lights"	The Weeknd	Republic	
14 May	"Blinding Lights"	The Weeknd	Republic	
21 May ^{[b]}	"Blinding Lights"	The Weeknd	Republic	
28 May ^{[a]}	"Rockstar"	DaBaby featuring Roddy Ricch	Interscope	
4 June	"Rockstar"	DaBaby featuring Roddy Ricch	Interscope	
11 June ^{[a]}	"Rockstar"	DaBaby featuring Roddy Ricch	Interscope	
18 June ^{[a]}	"Rockstar"	DaBaby featuring Roddy Ricch	Interscope	
25 June ^{[a]}	"Rockstar"	DaBaby featuring Roddy Ricch	Interscope	
2 July ^{[a]}	"Rockstar"	DaBaby featuring Roddy Ricch	Interscope	
9 July	"Rockstar"	DaBaby featuring Roddy Ricch	Interscope	
16 July	"Rockstar"	DaBaby featuring Roddy Ricch	Interscope	
23 July	"Rockstar"	DaBaby featuring Roddy Ricch	Interscope	
30 July	"Rockstar"	DaBaby featuring Roddy Ricch	Interscope	
6 August	"Rockstar"	DaBaby featuring Roddy Ricch	Interscope	
13 August	"Rockstar"	DaBaby featuring Roddy Ricch	Interscope	
20 August	"Rockstar"	DaBaby featuring Roddy Ricch	Interscope	
27 August	"WAP"	Cardi B featuring Megan Thee Stallion	Atlantic	
3 September	"WAP"	Cardi B featuring Megan Thee Stallion	Atlantic	
10 September ^{[a]}	"WAP"	Cardi B featuring Megan Thee Stallion	Atlantic	
17 September ^{[a]}	"WAP"	Cardi B featuring Megan Thee Stallion	Atlantic	
24 September ^{[a]}	"WAP"	Cardi B featuring Megan Thee Stallion	Atlantic	
1 October ^{[a]}	"Mood"	24kGoldn featuring Iann Dior	Black Butter	
8 October ^{[a]}	"Mood"	24kGoldn featuring Iann Dior	Black Butter	
15 October ^{[a]}	"Mood"	24kGoldn featuring Iann Dior	Black Butter	
22 October ^{[a]}	"Mood"	24kGoldn featuring Iann Dior	Black Butter	
29 October	"Mood"	24kGoldn featuring Iann Dior	Black Butter	
5 November	"Mood"	24kGoldn featuring Iann Dior	Black Butter	
12 November	"Mood"	24kGoldn featuring Iann Dior	Black Butter	
19 November	"Mood"	24kGoldn featuring Iann Dior	Black Butter	
26 November	"Mood"	24kGoldn featuring Iann Dior	Black Butter	
3 December	"Mood"	24kGoldn featuring Iann Dior	Black Butter	
10 December	"Mood"	24kGoldn featuring Iann Dior	Black Butter	
17 December	"Mood"	24kGoldn featuring Iann Dior	Black Butter	
24 December	"Mood"	24kGoldn featuring Iann Dior	Black Butter	
31 December	"Mood"	24kGoldn featuring Iann Dior	Black Butter	

== Notes ==
- ^{a} - The single was simultaneously number one on the UK Singles Chart.
- ^{b} - The artist was simultaneously number one on the R&B Albums Chart.

== See also ==
- List of UK Singles Chart number ones of 2020
- List of UK R&B Albums Chart number ones of 2020
- List of UK Dance Singles Chart number ones of 2020
