= Vistas (band) =

Scottish indie rock band

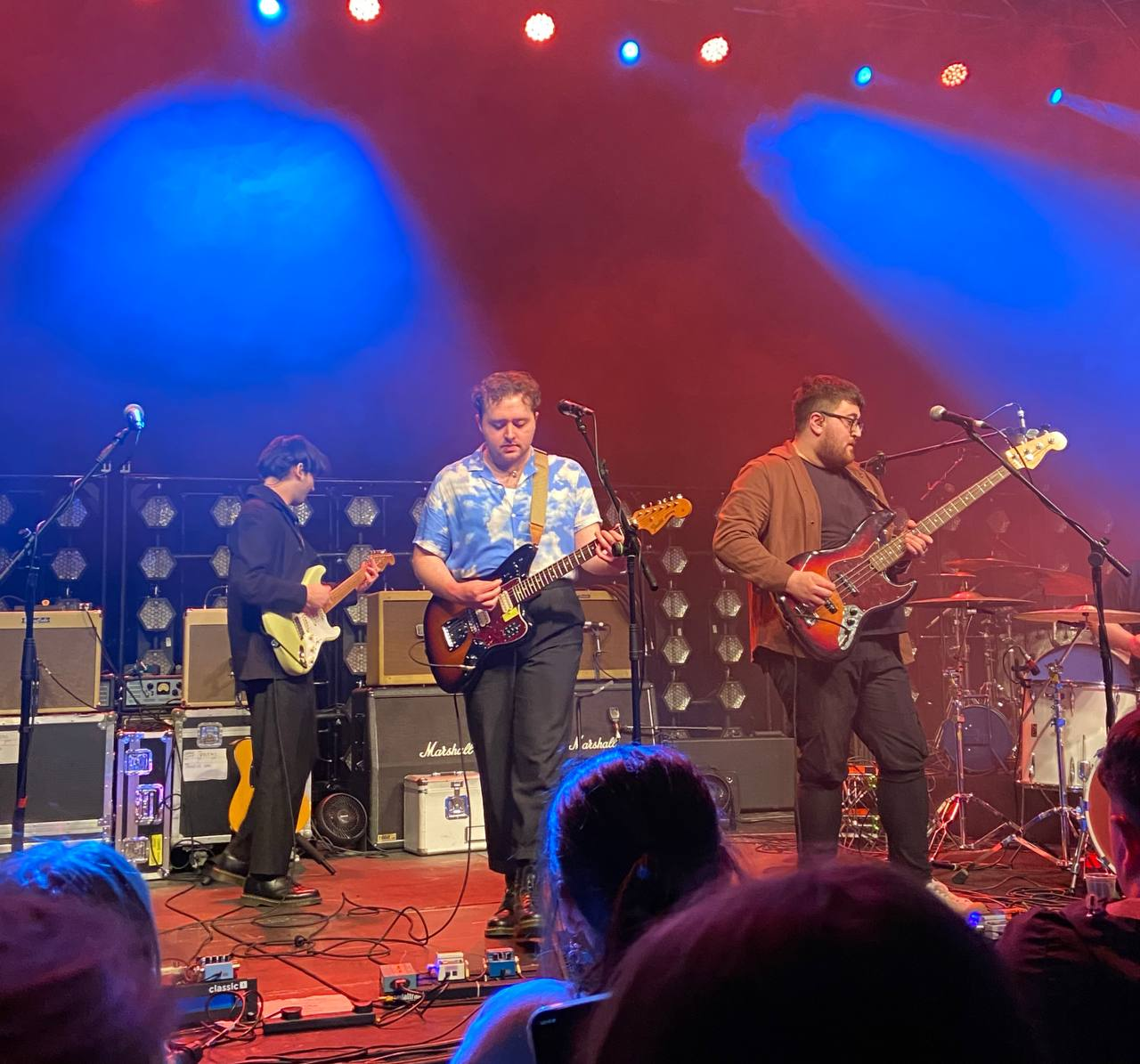
- Vistas in concert at Cardiff University Students' Union in 2022; from left to right: Dylan Rush, Prentice Robertson and Jamie Law

Background information
- Origin: Edinburgh, Scotland
- Genres: Alternative; indie rock
- Years active: 2016–present
- Labels: Retrospect; LAB
- Members: Prentice Robertson; Dylan Rush; Jamie Law

Vistas are a Scottish indie rock band from Edinburgh, Scotland. They released their debut studio album Everything Changes in the End in May 2020. The group consists of Prentice Robertson, Dylan Rush and Jamie Law.

== Career ==
The band formed at school and developed a tight bond. They released their debut single, "Sign Language" in 2016. They released the single "Retrospect" in May 2018. Their debut EP, Hello was released on 26 July 2019.

They released "Teenage Blues" on 26 November 2019 as the lead single from their debut studio album. "Sucker" was re-released as second single from their debut studio album. Everything Changes in the End was released as their debut studio album on 29 May 2020. The album peaked at number two on the Scottish Albums Chart and number twenty-one on the UK Albums Chart.

They released their second album "What Were You Hoping To Find?" on 20 August 2021, later in November they released the deluxe edition. In 2022, they began releasing new singles, starting with "Back Of The Car" in September 2022, which was then released as a 5 song EP "The Beautiful Nothing" on 27 January 2023.

The band started to tease new music on 8 April 2025 and on 25 April 2025, the lead single "The Middle" was released. On 30 May 2025, they announced their 4th studio album "Cut The Cord" will be released on 29th August 2025.

== Members ==
- Prentice Robertson – vocals (2016–present)
- Dylan Rush – guitar (2016–present)
- Jamie Law – bassist (2016–present)

== Discography ==
=== Studio albums ===
Title	Details	Peak chart positions	
Title	Details	SCO	UK
Everything Changes in the End	Released: 29 May 2020; Label: Retrospect; Format: Digital download, streaming, CD, LP	2	21
What Were You Hoping to Find?	Released: 20 August 2021; Label: Retrospect; Format: Digital download, streaming, CD, LP	3	39
Is This All We Are?	Released: 15 September 2023; Label: Is Right Records; Format: Digital download, streaming, CD, LP	14	—
Cut The Cord	Released: 29 August 2025; Label: Self-released; Format: Digital download, streaming, CD, LP	—	—

=== Extended plays ===
Title	Details
Hello	Released: 26 July 2019; Label: LAB Records; Format: Digital download, streaming, CD
The Beautiful Nothing	Released: 27 January 2023; Label: Is Right Records; Format: Digital download, streaming, CD, EP

=== Singles ===
Title	Year	Album
"Sign Language"	2016	Non-album singles
"Calm"	2018	Non-album singles
"Retrospect"	2018	Everything Changes in the End
"Teenage Blues"	2019	Everything Changes in the End
"Sucker"	2020	Everything Changes in the End
"Stranger"	2020	Non-album singles
"Comfort"	2020	Non-album singles
"Back Of The Car"	2022	The Beautiful Nothing
"Follow You Down"	2022	The Beautiful Nothing
"My Head Feels Strange"	2022	The Beautiful Nothing
"One More Night With No One"	2023	The Beautiful Nothing
"Last Together"	2023	Is This All We Are?
"Is This All We Are?"	2023	Is This All We Are?
"I know I know"	2023	Is This All We Are?
"Nowadays"	2023	Is This All We Are?
"Bad Idea"	2023	Is This All We Are?
"The Middle"	2025	Cut The Cord
"Cut The Cord"	2025	Cut The Cord
"Next Year"	2025	Cut The Cord
"Take It From The Skies"	2025	Cut The Cord

== In popular culture ==
- In 2019, their song "Tigerblood" was part of the soundtrack of the mobile video game Dream League Soccer. In 2020, they were part of the franchise's soundtrack again with their song "Eighteen".
- Their single, "Retrospect", was included on the soundtrack of the Netflix drama Heartstopper season 2.
- The opener of their 2023 EP, The Beautiful Nothing, was included on the soundtrack of the 2024 Amazon Prime film Ricky Stanicky starting Zac Efron and John Cena.
