= Pump It Up! =

2004 single by Danzel

Single by The Black & White Brothers
- Released: 1998
- Length: 3:46
- Label: N.E.W.S.
- Songwriters: Dario Mancini; Michael Anthony Hall
- Producers: Dario Mancini; Michael Anthony Hall

The Black & White Brothers singles chronology
"Put Your Hands Up" (1998)	"Pump It Up!" (1998)

Audio
- "Pump It Up" by the Black & White Brothers on YouTube

"Pump It Up!" is a song recorded by Swiss electronic duo the Black & White Brothers. It was released in 1998 as a single and charted in Belgium.

== Track listing ==
- Belgium CD single
1. "Pump It Up!" (Accapella Disco Version Radio Edit) - 3:46
2. "Pump It Up!" (Accapella Disco Version) - 6:46

== Charts ==
Chart (1998)	Peak position
Belgium (Ultratop 50 Flanders)	16
Belgium (Ultratop 50 Wallonia)	2

== Danzel version ==
"Pump It Up!"

Single by Danzel

from the album The Name of the Jam
- B-side: "Downtown"
- Released: 2004
- Length: 3:45
- Label: 541; Superstar; Data
- Producer: Jaco Van Rijswijk

Danzel singles chronology
"You Are All of That" (2003)	"Pump It Up!" (2004)	"Put Your Hands Up in the Air!" (2005)

Music video
- "Pump It Up" by Danzel on YouTube
- "Pump It Up" by Endor on YouTube

Pump It Up! was remixed by Belgian musician Danzel in 2004. Released as the second single from his debut album, The Name of the Jam, "Pump It Up!" achieved success throughout Europe; it reached the top 10 in more than 10 countries and peaked at number 11 on the UK Singles Chart. In the United States, the song reached number 29 on the Billboard Dance Club Play chart.

In 2007, Pancheros Mexican Grill used the song for their in-game segment, 'The Burrito Lift' during the University of Iowa football and basketball games. The song is beloved by Hawkeye fans and 'The Burrito Lift' is one of Iowa's favorite gameday traditions.

In 2019, the song was remixed by British DJ Endor and issued on Defected Records. It reached number one on the US Billboard Dance Club Songs chart in November 2019, and number eight on the UK Singles Chart in January 2020. The remix was certified double platinum by the Australian Recording Industry Association (ARIA). This remix has taken hold in Michigan Wolverines athletics with it being played after every touchdown.

=== Track listings ===
Belgian CD single

1. "Pump It Up!" (radio edit) – 3:45
2. "Downtown" (vocal club mix) – 7:21

Belgian 12-inch single

A1. "Pump It Up!" (extended mix) – 5:53
A2. "Pump It Up!" (acappella) – 2:29
B1. "Pump It Up!" (club mix) – 7:02
B2. "Downtown" (club mix) – 5:50

German CD single

1. "Pump It Up!" (radio edit) – 3:45
2. "Pump It Up!" (Profanation 'Trust in Trance' mix) – 6:54
3. "Downtown" (club mix) – 5:50

UK CD single

1. "Pump It Up!" (radio edit)
2. "Pump It Up!" (extended mix)
3. "Pump It Up!" (Uniting Nations remix)
4. "Pump It Up!" (Jerry Ropero & Denis the Menace remix)
5. "Pump It Up!" (Gladiator remix)
6. "Pump It Up!" (Saint remix)
7. "Pump It Up!" (video)

UK 12-inch single

A1. "Pump It Up!" (Uniting Nations remix)
A2. "Pump It Up!" (Alex K Klubbed Up remix)
B1. "Pump It Up!" (Gladiator remix)

US 12-inch single

A1. "Pump It Up!" (club mix)
A2. "Pump It Up!" (extended mix)
B1. "Downtown" (vocal club mix)

US 12-inch remixes single

A1. "Pump It Up!" (Crowd remix)
A2. "Pump It Up!" (Funky Junction & Joao Da Silva Iberican dub mix)
B1. "Pump It Up!" (Funky Junction & FC Nond Stone remix)
B2. "Pump It Up!" (acappella)

Australian CD single

1. "Pump It Up!" (radio edit)
2. "Pump It Up!" (Highpass edit)
3. "Pump It Up!" (Highpass mix)
4. "Pump It Up!" (extended mix)
5. "Pump It Up!" (club mix)
6. "Downtown" (vocal club mix)

=== Personnel ===
- Co-producer – Johan Waem
- Percussion – Philip Cortez
- Producer – Jaco Van Rijswijk
- Vocals – Danzel
- Writers – Djaimin, Mr. Mike

=== Charts ===
==== Weekly charts ====
Chart (2004–2005)	Peak position
Australia (ARIA)	84
Austria (Ö3 Austria Top 40)	3
Belgium (Ultratop 50 Flanders)	8
Belgium (Ultratop 50 Wallonia)	5
Belgium Dance (Ultratop Flanders)	1
CIS Airplay (TopHit)	4
Czech Republic (IFPI)	2
Denmark (Tracklisten)	8
Europe (Eurochart Hot 100)	11
France (SNEP)	6
Germany (GfK)	4
Greece (IFPI)	10
Hungary (Dance Top 40)	1
Hungary (Editors' Choice Top 40)	24
Ireland (IRMA)	8
Ireland Dance (IRMA)	1
Italy (FIMI)	10
Netherlands (Dutch Top 40)	34
Netherlands (Dutch Top 40) Remix	16
Netherlands (Single Top 100)	16
Poland (PiF PaF)	10
Romania (Romanian Top 100)	4
Russia Airplay (TopHit)	4
Scottish Singles Sales (Official Charts)	7
Sweden (Sverigetopplistan)	52
Switzerland (Schweizer Hitparade)	5
Ukraine Airplay (TopHit)	19
UK Singles (Official Charts)	11
UK Dance (Official Charts)	13
US Dance Club Songs (Billboard)	29

Chart (2025)	Peak position
Moldova Airplay (TopHit)	34

==== Monthly charts ====
Chart (2025)	Peak position
Moldova Airplay (TopHit)	97

==== Year-end charts ====
Chart (2004)	Position
Austria (Ö3 Austria Top 40)	52
Belgium (Ultratop 50 Flanders)	22
Belgium (Ultratop 50 Wallonia)	23
CIS Airplay (TopHit)	48
France (SNEP)	34
Germany (Media Control GfK)	33
Netherlands (Single Top 100)	72
Russia Airplay (TopHit)	53
Switzerland (Schweizer Hitparade)	76
Ukraine Airplay (TopHit)	43

Chart (2005)	Position
Romania (Romanian Top 100)	81

=== Certifications ===
Region	Certification	Certified units/sales
Australia (ARIA) Endor remix	2× Platinum	140,000^{‡}
Belgium (BRMA)	Gold	25,000^{*}
Belgium (BRMA) Endor remix	Gold	20,000^{‡}
Denmark (IFPI Danmark) Endor remix	Gold	45,000^{‡}
France (SNEP)	Gold	250,000^{*}
France (SNEP) Endor remix	Gold	100,000^{‡}
Italy (FIMI) Endor remix	Gold	50,000^{‡}
New Zealand (RMNZ) Endor remix	3× Platinum	90,000^{‡}
Norway (IFPI Norway) Endor remix	Gold	30,000^{‡}
Spain (Promusicae) Endor remix	Gold	30,000^{‡}
United Kingdom (BPI) Endor remix	2× Platinum	1,200,000^{‡}
Streaming
Sweden (GLF) Endor remix	Gold	4,000,000^{†}
^{*} Sales figures based on certification alone.^{‡} Sales+streaming figures based on certification alone.^{†} Streaming-only figures based on certification alone.

== See also ==
- List of Billboard number-one dance songs of 2019
