= List of UK R&B Albums Chart number ones of 2020 =

The logo of the Official Charts Company, responsible for compiling all of the official music charts in the United Kingdom, including the R&B albums chart.

The UK R&B Albums Chart is a weekly chart, first introduced in October 1994, that ranks the 40 biggest-selling albums that are classified in the R&B genre in the United Kingdom. The chart is compiled by the Official Charts Company, and is based on sales of CDs, downloads, vinyl and other formats over the previous seven days.

The following are the number-one albums of 2020.

== Number-one albums ==
Issue date	Album	Artist(s)	Record label	Ref.
3 January	Grime MC	Jme	Boy Better Know	
10 January ^{[a]} ^{[b]}	Heavy Is the Head	Stormzy	Atlantic/Merky	
17 January ^{[b]}	Heavy Is the Head	Stormzy	Atlantic/Merky	
24 January ^{[a]} ^{[b]}	Music to Be Murdered By	Eminem	Interscope	
31 January	Music to Be Murdered By	Eminem	Interscope	
7 February	Music to Be Murdered By	Eminem	Interscope	
14 February	Music to Be Murdered By	Eminem	Interscope	
21 February	Music to Be Murdered By	Eminem	Interscope	
28 February	Heavy Is the Head	Stormzy	Atlantic/Merky	
6 March	Music to Be Murdered By	Eminem	Interscope	
13 March	Music to Be Murdered By	Eminem	Interscope	
20 March	Music to Be Murdered By	Eminem	Interscope	
27 March ^{[a]}	After Hours	The Weeknd	Republic/XO	
3 April	Insomnia	Skepta/Chip/Young Adz	SKC M29	
10 April ^{[b]}	After Hours	The Weeknd	Republic/XO	
17 April ^{[b]}	After Hours	The Weeknd	Republic/XO	
24 April ^{[b]}	After Hours	The Weeknd	Republic/XO	
1 May	What Kinda Music	Tom Misch & Yussef Dayes	Beyond the Groovee/Blue Note	
8 May ^{[a]}	Dark Lane Demo Tapes	Drake	OVO/Republic	
15 May ^{[b]}	After Hours	The Weeknd	Republic/XO	
22 May	After Hours	The Weeknd	Republic/XO	
29 May	Dissimulation	KSI	RBC	
5 June	Polaris	Aitch	NQ	
12 June	RTJ4	Run the Jewels	BMG	
19 June	Back to Black	Amy Winehouse	Island	
26 June	After Hours	The Weeknd	Republic/XO	
3 July	After Hours	The Weeknd	Republic/XO	
10 July	After Hours	The Weeknd	Republic/XO	
17 July	None of Us Are Getting Out of This Life Alive	The Streets	Island	
24 July	Lianne La Havas	Lianne La Havas	Warner	
31 July	Lianne La Havas	Lianne La Havas	Warner	
7 August	Bigger Love	John Legend	Columbia	
14 August	None of Us Are Getting Out of This Life Alive	The Streets	Island	
21 August	Back to Black	Amy Winehouse	Island	
28 August	King's Disease	Nas	Mass Appeal	
4 September	Crabs in a Bucket	Nines	Warner	
11 September	Crabs in a Bucket	Nines	Warner	
18 September	Back to Black	Amy Winehouse	Island	
25 September	RTJ4	Run the Jewels	BMG	
2 October	After Hours	The Weeknd	Republic	
9 October	After Hours	The Weeknd	Republic	
16 October	The Blue Print: Us vs. Them	D-Block Europe	D-Block Europe	
23 October	Love & Hate	Michael Kiwanuka	Polydor	
30 October	Beastie Boys Music	Beastie Boys	UMC	
6 November	E3 AF	Dizzee Rascal	Dirtee Stank	
13 November	Dutch From the 5th	Dutchavelli	Parlophone	
20 November	Street Side Effects	K-Trap	Black Butter	
27 November	Back to Black	Amy Winehouse	Island	
4 December	After Hours	The Weeknd	Republic	
11 December	Gospel	Mica Paris	East West	
18 December	Back to Black	Amy Winehouse	Island	
25 December	Music to Be Murdered By	Eminem	Interscope	

== Notes ==
- ^{a} - The album was simultaneously number-one on the UK Albums Chart.
- ^{b} - The artist was simultaneously number-one on the R&B Singles Chart.

== See also ==
- List of UK Albums Chart number ones of the 2020s
- List of UK R&B Singles Chart number ones of 2020
