= List of UK Rock & Metal Singles Chart number ones of 2020 =

The UK Rock & Metal Singles Chart is a record chart which ranks the best-selling rock and heavy metal songs in the United Kingdom. Compiled and published by the Official Charts Company, the data is based on each track's weekly physical sales and digital downloads . The first number one of the year was "Christmas Time (Don't Let the Bells End)" by The Darkness.

== Chart history ==
Issue date	Single	Artist(s)	Record label(s)	Ref.
2 January	"Christmas Time (Don't Let the Bells End)"	The Darkness	Must Destroy	
9 January	"Don't Stop Me Now"	Queen	Island	
16 January	"Bohemian Rhapsody"	Queen	Island	
23 January	"Bohemian Rhapsody"	Queen	Island	
30 January	"Bohemian Rhapsody"	Queen	Island	
6 February	"Bohemian Rhapsody"	Queen	Island	
13 February	"Bohemian Rhapsody"	Queen	Island	
20 February	"Bohemian Rhapsody"	Queen	Island	
27 February	"Bohemian Rhapsody"	Queen	Island	
5 March	"Bohemian Rhapsody"	Queen	Island	
12 March	"Bohemian Rhapsody"	Queen	Island	
19 March	"Bohemian Rhapsody"	Queen	Island	
26 March	"Bohemian Rhapsody"	Queen	Island	
2 April	"Bohemian Rhapsody"	Queen	Island	
9 April	"Bohemian Rhapsody"	Queen	Island	
16 April	"Bohemian Rhapsody"	Queen	Island	
23 April	"Bohemian Rhapsody"	Queen	Island	
30 April	"Bohemian Rhapsody"	Queen	Island	
7 May	"Bohemian Rhapsody"	Queen	Island	
14 May	"Bohemian Rhapsody"	Queen	Island	
21 May	"Bohemian Rhapsody"	Queen	Island	
28 May	"Bohemian Rhapsody"	Queen	Island	
4 June	"Bohemian Rhapsody"	Queen	Island	
11 June	"Bohemian Rhapsody"	Queen	Island	
18 June	"Bohemian Rhapsody"	Queen	Island	
25 June	"Bohemian Rhapsody"	Queen	Island	
2 July	"Bohemian Rhapsody"	Queen	Island	
9 July	"Parasite Eve"	Bring Me the Horizon	RCA	
16 July	"Parasite Eve"	Bring Me the Horizon	RCA	
23 July	"Bohemian Rhapsody"	Queen	Island	
30 July	"Bohemian Rhapsody"	Queen	Island	
6 August	"Bohemian Rhapsody"	Queen	Island	
13 August	"Bohemian Rhapsody"	Queen	Island	
20 August	"Don't Stop Me Now"	Queen	Island	
27 August	"Don't Stop Me Now"	Queen	Island	
3 September	"Don't Stop Me Now"	Queen	Island	
10 September	"Don't Stop Me Now"	Queen	Island	
17 September	"Obey"	Bring Me the Horizon & Yungblud	RCA	
24 September	"Obey"	Bring Me the Horizon & Yungblud	RCA	
1 October	"Bohemian Rhapsody"	Queen	Island	
8 October	"Forget Me Too"	Machine Gun Kelly	Bad Boy/Interscope	
15 October	"Forget Me Too"	Machine Gun Kelly	Bad Boy/Interscope	
22 October	"Bohemian Rhapsody"	Queen	Island	
29 October	"Bohemian Rhapsody"	Queen	Island	
5 November	"Teardrops"	Bring Me the Horizon	RCA	
12 November	"Teardrops"	Bring Me the Horizon	RCA	
19 November	"Don't Stop Me Now"	Queen	Island	
26 November	"Bohemian Rhapsody"	Queen	Island	
3 December	"Christmas Time (Don't Let The Bells End)"	The Darkness	Must Destroy	
10 December	"Christmas Time (Don't Let The Bells End)"	The Darkness	Must Destroy	
17 December	"Christmas Time (Don't Let The Bells End)"	The Darkness	Must Destroy	
24 December	"Christmas Time (Don't Let The Bells End)"	The Darkness	Must Destroy	
31 December	"Christmas Time (Don't Let The Bells End)"	The Darkness	Must Destroy	

== See also ==
- List of UK Rock & Metal Albums Chart number ones of 2020
