= List of UK Rock & Metal Albums Chart number ones of 2020 =

The UK Rock & Metal Albums Chart is a record chart which ranks the best-selling rock and heavy metal albums in the United Kingdom. Compiled and published by the Official Charts Company, the data is based on each album's weekly physical sales and digital downloads.

== Chart history ==
Issue date	Album	Artist(s)	Record label(s)	Ref.
2 January	The Dark Side of the Moon	Pink Floyd	Rhino	
9 January	Nevermind	Nirvana	Geffen	
16 January	Nevermind	Nirvana	Geffen	
23 January	I Disagree	Poppy	Sumerian	
30 January	The Serpent Rings	Magnum	Steamhammer	
6 February	Fall Better	Vukovi	Vukovi	
13 February	Darkness Brings the Wonders Home	Smoke Fairies	Year Seven	
20 February	Father of All...	Green Day	Reprise	
27 February	New Empire, Vol. 1	Hollywood Undead	BMG	
5 March	Ordinary Man	Ozzy Osbourne	Epic	
12 March	F8	Five Finger Death Punch	Better Noise	
19 March	Ordinary Man	Ozzy Osbourne	Epic	
26 March	Underneath	Code Orange	Roadrunner	
2 April	Transmissions + 1969	Pink Floyd	Audio Vaults	
9 April	Gigaton	Pearl Jam	Monkeywrench	
16 April	Gigaton	Pearl Jam	Monkeywrench	
23 April	Human II Nature	Nightwish	Nuclear Blast	
30 April	Nothing Is True & Everything Is Possible	Enter Shikari	So	
7 May	What the Dead Men Say	Trivium	Roadrunner	
14 May	Glue	Boston Manor	Pure Noise	
21 May	Nevermind	Nirvana	Geffen	
28 May	Obsidian	Paradise Lost	Nuclear Blast	
4 June	Synchronized	FM	Frontiers	
11 June	Permanent Waves	Rush	UMC	
18 June	The Ghost Inside	The Ghost Inside	Epitaph	
25 June	The Essential	Thin Lizzy	Spectrum	
2 July	Lamb of God	Lamb of God	Nuclear Blast	
9 July	Amends	Grey Daze	Loma Vista	
16 July	Cannibal	Bury Tomorrow	Music for Nations	
23 July	The Gereg	The Hu	Eleven Seven	
30 July	House of Noise	Massive Wagons	Earache	
6 August	All Distortions Are Intentional	Neck Deep	Hopeless	
13 August	Sex, Death & the Infinite Void	Creeper	Roadrunner	
20 August	Whoosh!	Deep Purple	Ear Music	
27 August	Whoosh!	Deep Purple	Ear Music	
3 September	Holy Moly	Blues Pills	Nuclear Blast	
10 September	S&M2	Metallica	Vertigo	
17 September	S&M2	Metallica	Vertigo	
24 September	We Are Chaos	Marilyn Manson	Concord/Loma Vista Recordings	
1 October	Live at the Roundhouse	Nick Mason's Saucerful of Secrets	Sony	
8 October	Ohms	Deftones	Reprise	
15 October	Us + Them	Roger Waters	Sony	
22 October	Iron Maiden	Iron Maiden	Rhino	
29 October	Strange Days	The Struts	Interscope	
5 November	Blossom	Frank Carter & The Rattlesnakes	International Death Cult	
12 November	The Human Condition	Black Stone Cherry	Mascot	
19 November	Love Songs	Whitesnake	Rhino	
26 November	Power Up	AC/DC	Columbia	
3 December	Nights of the Dead - Legacy of the Beast	Iron Maiden	Parlophone	
10 December	Power Up	AC/DC	Columbia	
17 December	Power Up	AC/DC	Columbia	
24 December	Power Up	AC/DC	Columbia	
31 December	Power Up	AC/DC	Columbia	

== See also ==
- List of UK Rock & Metal Singles Chart number ones of 2020
