= List of performers on Later... with Jools Holland =

The following is a list of artists who have performed on Later... with Jools Holland.

== 0-9 ==
- 1 Giant Leap with Robbie Williams, Maxi Jazz, Mahotella Queens & Baaba Maal
- 22-20s

== A ==
- A. J. Croce
- Angine de Poitire
- Ayanna Witter-Johnson
- ABC of Boogie Woogie
- Aaron Neville
- Abdullah Ibrahim Trio
- Abigail Washburn
- Acoustic Ladyland
- Adam Ant
- Adam Cohen
- Adele
- Adrian Edmondson
- Aerosmith
- Afel Bocoum
- Afel Bocoum and Damon Albarn
- Afro Celt Sound System
- Agnes Obel
- Aimee Mann
- Air Traffic
- Air
- Akon
- Al Green
- Ala.Ni
- Alabama 3
- Alabama Shakes
- Alanis Morissette
- Aldous Harding
- Alela Diane
- Alessia Cara
- Alex James
- Alex Lloyd
- Alexander O'Neal
- Ali Campbell
- Ali Farka Toure
- Alice Cooper
- Alice in Chains
- Alicia Keys
- Alison Krauss
- Alison Krauss & Union Station
- Alison Moyet
- All Saints
- Allen Toussaint
- Allison Moorer
- Aloe Blacc
- Alt-J (∆)
- Altan
- AlunaGeorge
- Alvin Youngblood Hart
- Amadou & Mariam
- Amp Fiddler
- Amy LaVere
- Amy Winehouse
- Amyl and the Sniffers
- Ana Moura
- Anastacia
- Andrew Roachford
- Andreya Triana
- Andy Fairweather Low
- Andy Sheppard
- Andy Williams
- Angie Stone
- Angélique Kidjo
- Anita Baker
- Anjani
- Ann Peebles
- Anna Calvi
- Annie Lennox
- Anthony David
- Antony and the Johnsons
- Anúna
- Apache Indian
- Aqualung
- Arcade Fire
- Arctic Monkeys
- Arooj Aftab
- Artful Dodger
- Arthur 'Gaps' Hendrickson
- Arthur Lee
- Ash
- Asher Roth
- Ashley McBryde
- Asian Dub Foundation
- Aswad
- At the Drive In
- Athlete
- Audioweb
- Avery Sunshine
- Aziza Brahim
- Aztec Camera
- Aṣa

== B ==
- B.B. King
- BR549
- Baaba Maal
- Baby Bird
- Babyshambles
- Badly Drawn Boy
- Band of Horses
- Band of Skulls
- Barbara Orbison
- Barbara Thompson
- Barrence Whitfield & The Savages
- Barry Gibb
- Basement Jaxx
- Bassekou Kouyate & Ngoni Ba
- Bat for Lashes
- Battles
- Beach House
- Beady Eye
- Bebel Gilberto
- Beck
- Beenie Man
- Beirut
- Belle & Sebastian
- Bellowhead
- Belly
- Ben Folds Five
- Ben Harper
- Ben Harper & The Innocent Criminals
- Ben Howard
- Ben Watt
- Ben Westbeech
- Ben l'Oncle Soul
- Benjamin Booker
- Benjamin Clementine
- Bentley Rhythm Ace
- Bernard Butler
- Bert Jansch
- Beth Gibbons and Rustin' Man
- Beth Hart
- Beth Jeans Houghton & The Hooves Of Destiny
- Beth Orton
- Betty Wright
- Bettye LaVette
- Beverley Knight
- Bhi Bhiman
- Biffy Clyro
- Biig Piig
- Bill Wyman's Rhythm Kings
- Billie Myers
- Billie Ray Martin
- Billy Bragg
- Billy Preston
- Bitty McLean
- Björk
- Black Grape
- Black Joe Lewis & the Honeybears
- Black Kids
- Black Rebel Motorcycle Club
- Black Umfolosi
- Blackberry Smoke
- Blackstreet
- Blind Boys Of Alabama
- Bloc Party
- Blondie
- Blossoms
- Blur
- Bo Diddley
- Bob & Marcia
- Bobby McFerrin
- Bobby Whitlock & Eric Clapton
- Bobby Womack
- Bobby Womack with Damon Albarn
- Bombino
- Bon Iver
- Bonnie Raitt
- Bonnie Raitt & Paul Brady
- Booker T
- Booth and the Bad Angel
- Bootsy Collins
- Boy George
- Boz Scaggs
- Brand New Heavies
- Brandi Carlile
- Brandon Flowers
- Breakbeat Era
- Brendan Benson
- Brendan Power
- Brett Anderson
- Brian Eno & Karl Hyde
- Brian Wilson
- British Sea Power
- Broadcast
- Bryan Ferry
- Buddy Greco
- Buddy Guy
- Buddy Miller
- Buena Vista Social Club with Ry Cooder
- Buju Banton
- Burning Spear
- Burt Bacharach
- Béla Fleck
- Béla Fleck & Abigail Washburn

== C ==
- C. W. Stoneking
- Courtney Barnett
- CHVRCHES
- CSS (Cansei de Ser Sexy)
- CW Stoneking
- Cachaíto López
- Cage the Elephant
- Calexico
- Calvin Harris
- Cameron Winter
- Camille O'Sullivan
- Camille
- Campag Velocet
- Campbell
- Candi Staton
- Candie Payne
- Caravan Palace
- Carla Bruni
- Carleen Anderson
- Carmel
- Caro Emerald
- Carole King
- Carolina Chocolate Drops
- Cassandra Wilson
- Cast
- Cat Power
- Cat Stevens
- Catatonia
- Cate Le Bon
- Cath Coffey
- CeeLo Green
- Celso Fonseca
- Cécile McLorin Salvant
- Céu
- Cesária Évora
- Chaka Demus & Pliers
- Chaka Khan
- Chapel Club
- Charles & Eddie
- Charles Bradley
- Charley Pride
- Charlie Haden Quartet West
- Charlie Musselwhite
- Charlie Watts
- Charlie Wilson
- Chas & Dave
- Chase & Status
- Chastity Brown
- Chatham County Line
- Cheb Mami
- Cheikh Lô
- Cherry Ghost
- Chris Difford
- Chris Isaak
- Chris Rea
- Chris Smither
- Chrissie Hynde
- Christine and the Queens
- Christy Moore
- Clannad
- Clean Bandit
- Clearlake
- Cleo Laine
- CocknBullKid
- Cocteau Twins
- Cody ChesnuTT
- Cold Specks
- Cold War Kids
- Coldplay
- Colin Blunstone & Rod Argent (from The Zombies)
- Common
- Concha Buika
- Corinne Bailey Rae
- Cornershop
- Counting Crows
- Courteeners
- Courtney Pine
- Courtney Pine & David McAlmont
- Cousteau
- Cowboy Junkies
- Cracker
- Craig David
- Creole Choir of Cuba
- Crowded House
- Crystal Castles
- Crystal Fighters
- Culture Club
- Curtis Harding
- Cymande
- Cyndi Lauper

== D ==
- D'Angelo
- D'Influence
- DC Basehead
- DC Lee
- DakhaBrakha
- Dame Cleo Laine & Sir John Dankworth
- Damien Jurado
- Damien Rice
- Damon Albarn
- Damon Albarn & Afel Bocoum
- Dan Penn
- Daniel Caesar
- Daniel Merriweather
- Danny Thompson
- Dave
- Dave Alvin
- Dave and Phil Alvin
- Dave Brubeck
- Dave Edmunds
- Dave Gahan & Soulsavers
- Dave Stewart
- David Bowie
- David Byrne
- David Byrne and Morcheeba
- David Crosby & Graham Nash
- David Gilmour
- David Gilmour & Mica Paris
- David Gray
- David Gray with Annie Lennox
- David Holmes' Free Association
- David McAlmont
- David McComb & The Red Ponies
- David Rotheray
- David Sanborn
- Davina and the Vagabonds
- Dawn Kinnard and Ed Harcourt
- Dawn Penn
- De La Soul
- DeVotchKa
- Deap Vally
- Death In Vegas
- Declan McKenna
- Dee C. Lee
- Del Amitri
- Delphic
- Delta Spirit
- Denai Moore
- Dengue Fever
- Denim
- Depeche Mode
- Derek Taylor
- Desmond Dekker
- Devendra Banhart
- Devon Sproule
- Dexys Midnight Runners
- Dexys
- Dhruv
- Diana Jones
- Diana Krall
- Diane Birch
- Dianne Reeves
- Dick Dale
- Dido
- Dina Carroll
- Dion
- Dionne Farris
- Dionne Warwick
- Dirty Pretty Things
- Disclosure
- Disclosure (with Sam Smith and Kwabs)
- Dixie Chicks
- Dizzee Rascal
- Django Django
- Doja Cat
- Don Campbell
- Donovan
- Doudou Cissoko
- Doves
- Dr. John
- Dreadzone
- Drenge
- Drive-By Truckers
- Dru Hill
- Duffy
- Duke Special
- Duran Duran
- Dusty Springfield
- Dwight Yoakam

== E ==
- Eagle-Eye Cherry
- Eagulls
- Eartha Kitt
- Earthling
- Echo & the Bunnymen
- Ed Alleyne-Johnson
- Ed Harcourt
- Ed Sheeran
- Eddi Reader
- Eddie Floyd
- Editors
- Edwin Starr
- Edwyn Collins
- Eels
- Efua
- Elastica
- Elbow
- Electra Strings
- Electric Six
- Electronic
- Eli "Paperboy" Reed
- Eliza Carthy
- Elizabeth Fraser
- Ella Eyre
- Ellie Goulding
- Elliott Smith
- Elton John
- Elvis Costello
- Embrace
- Emeli Sandé
- Emmylou Harris
- Emmylou Harris with Buddy Miller
- En Vogue
- Engelbert Humperdinck
- Erasure
- Eric Bibb
- Eric Bibb & Charlie Musselwhite
- Eric Burdon
- Eric Church
- Eric Clapton
- Eric Turner
- Erik Mongrain
- Erin McKeown
- Erykah Badu
- Esperanza Spalding
- Estelle
- Evan Dando
- Everclear
- Everything Everything
- Everything but the Girl
- Ezra Furman

== F ==
- FFS
- FKA twigs
- Faith Evans
- Faithless
- Father John Misty
- Fatoumata Diawara
- Feeder
- Feist
- Femi Kuti
- Finley Quaye
- Finn
- First Aid Kit
- Fishbone
- Fleet Foxes
- Florence + the Machine
- Foals
- Foo Fighters
- Frank Black
- Franz Ferdinand
- Frazey Ford
- Freddie McGregor
- Fried
- Friendly Fires
- Fugees
- Fun Lovin' Criminals
- Fuse ODG
- Future Islands

== G ==
- G. Love & Special Sauce
- Gabriel Bruce
- Gabriella Cilmi
- Gabrielle
- Gallant
- Galliano
- Gallon Drunk
- Gang of Four
- Gappy Ranks
- Garbage
- Garth Brooks
- Gary Brooker
- Gary Clark Jr.
- Gay Dad
- Gedeon Luke & The People
- Geoffrey Isaacs
- George Benson
- George Ezra
- George the Poet
- Georgie Fame
- Geraint Watkins
- Ghostpoet
- Gillian Welch
- Gilson Lavis
- Giorgio Moroder
- Gipsy Kings
- Gladys Knight
- Glasvegas
- Glen Campbell
- Glen Hansard & Marketa Irglova (AKA The Swell Season)
- Glenn Lewis
- Glenn Tilbrook
- Gloria Estefan
- Gnarls Barkley
- GoGo Penguin
- Gogol Bordello
- Golden Silvers
- Goldfrapp
- Gomez
- Gorgon City
- Gorillaz
- Gorillaz with Mos Def and Bobby Womack and Little Dragon and De La Soul and Gruff Rhys
- Gorky's Zygotic Mynci
- Gossip
- Gotan Project
- Grace Jones
- Graham Central Station
- Graham Coxon
- Graham Nash
- Graham Parker & The Rumour
- Graham Parker
- Grandaddy
- Grandmaster Flash
- Grant Lee Buffalo
- Green Day
- Gregory Porter
- Grimes
- Grinderman
- Grizzly Bear
- Groove Armada
- Gruff Rhys
- Gurriers
- Gurrumul
- Guru's Jazzmatazz with Herbie Hancock, Angie Stone and Craig David
- Guru
- Guru with DC Lee
- Guy Garvey
- Gwenno

== H ==
- HAAi
- H.E.R
- Haim
- Hall & Oates
- Hank Marvin
- Hard-Fi
- Hayes Carll
- Hayseed Dixie
- Heaven 17
- Henri Salvador
- Herb Alpert
- Herbert Grönemeyer
- Herbert von Karajan
- Herbie Hancock
- Hill Street Soul
- Hinda Hicks
- Hockey
- Hole
- Hollie Cook
- Holly Johnson
- Honky
- Hootie and the Blowfish
- Hope of the States
- Horace Andy
- Hot Chip
- Howard Tate
- Hozier
- Huey Morgan
- Hugh Laurie
- Hurray for the Riff Raff
- Huutajat (The Screaming Men)
- Hypnotic Brass Ensemble

== I ==
- INXS
- Ian Brown
- Ian Dury
- Ian Dury & the Blockheads
- Ian Hunter
- Ibeyi
- Ibibio Sound Machine
- Ibrahim Ferrer
- Ibrahim Ferrer & Omara Portuondo
- Ice-T
- Ida Corr
- Ida Maria
- Idlewild
- Iggy Pop
- Imani Coppola
- Imelda May
- Incognito
- India.Arie
- Indigo Girls
- Inspiral Carpets
- Interpol
- Irma Thomas
- Isaac Hayes
- Izzy Bizu

== J ==
- JJ Cale
- Jacob Collier
- Jack Antonoff
- Jack Allsopp
- Jack Bruce
- Jack Peñate
- Jack White
- Jackie DeShannon
- Jackson Browne
- Jacob Banks
- Jacob Golden
- Jade Thirlwall
- Jah Wobble & The Invaders of the Heart with The Cranberries
- Jain
- Jake Bugg
- Jakob Dylan
- Jamelia
- James Bay
- James Blake
- James Blunt
- James Dean Bradfield
- James Hunter
- James Mass
- James Morrison
- James Taylor
- James Vincent McMorrow
- James
- Jamie Cullum
- Jamie Foxx
- Jamie Lidell
- Jamie T
- Jamie Woon
- Jamiroquai
- Jane Horrocks
- Jane's Addiction
- Janelle Monáe
- Jarvis Cocker
- Jay Kay
- Jay Z
- Jeff Beck
- Jellyfish
- Jenny Lewis
- Jerron Paxton
- Jerry Dammers & The Spatial AKA Orchestra
- Jess Glynne
- Jessie J
- Jessie Ware
- Jet
- Jewel
- Jhelisa
- Jill Scott
- Jimmie Vaughan
- Jimmy Cliff
- Jimmy Cobb's "So What" Band
- Jimmy Ruffin
- Jimmy Scott
- Jimmy Webb
- Joan Armatrading
- Joan As Police Woman
- Joan Baez
- Joanna Newsom
- Joanne Shaw Taylor
- Joe Bonamassa
- Joe Brown
- Joe Cocker
- Joe Jackson
- Joe Sample
- Joe Strummer
- Joe Strummer and The Mescaleros
- John Cale
- John Dankworth
- John Fogerty
- John Fullbright
- John Grant
- John Hiatt
- John Legend
- John Martyn
- John Mayer
- John Mellencamp
- John Newman
- John Parish
- John Parish and Polly Jean Harvey
- John Prine
- Johnny Cash
- Johnny Cash & June Carter Cash
- Johnny Clarke
- Johnny Marr
- Joi
- Jon Allen
- Jon Spencer Blues Explosion
- Jonathan Jeremiah
- Jonathan Richman
- Jools Holland's Rhythm and Blues Orchestra
- Jools Holland
- Joseph Arthur
- Josephine Oniyama
- Josh Homme
- Josh Osho
- Josh Ritter
- Josh T. Pearson
- Joss Stone
- José González
- Judy Collins
- Julian Joseph
- Julie Fowlis
- Julien Temple
- June Carter Cash
- June Tabor
- June Tabor & Oysterband
- Jungle
- Junior Brown
- Junior Murvin
- Junior Senior
- Just Jack
- Justin Vali Trio

== K ==
- k.d. Lang
- KWN
- KT Tunstall
- Kacey Musgraves
- Kaiser Chiefs
- Kaki King
- Kanda Bongo Man
- Kano
- Kano with Damon Albarn
- Kanye West
- Karima Francis
- Kasabian
- Kat Men
- Kate Nash
- Kate Rusby
- Kate Rusby with The 1st Battalion Scots Guards
- Kathryn Tickell
- Katie Webster
- Katy B
- Katy J Pearson
- Katy Perry
- Keane
- Keb' Mo'
- Kelis
- Kelly Joe Phelps
- Kelly Jones
- Kenickie
- Khaled
- Kimmo Pohjonen
- King Creosote
- Kings of Leon
- Kirsty MacColl
- Klaxons
- Kosheen
- Kristin Hersh
- Kristina Train
- Krystle Warren
- Kubb
- Kula Shaker
- Kurt Elling
- Kwabs
- Kwesi
- Kylie Minogue

== L ==
- LCD Soundsystem
- LSK
- La Polla Records
- Labi Siffre
- Labrinth
- Ladysmith Black Mambazo
- Lainey Wilson
- Lana Del Rey
- Larla O'Lionard
- Larry 'Mud' Morganfield
- Larry Graham & Graham Central Station
- Larry Harlow's Latin Legends Of Fania
- Lau
- Laura Doggett
- Laura Marling
- Laura Mvula
- Laurie Anderson
- Le Mystère des Voix Bulgares
- Lee Thompson
- Lemmy
- Lena Fiagbe
- Lenny Kravitz
- Leon Bridges
- Leonard Cohen
- Les Négresses Vertes
- Let's Eat Grandma
- Lewis Taylor
- Lhasa
- Liam Bailey
- Liam Finn
- Lianne La Havas
- Liberace
- Lighthouse Family
- Lil Jackie
- Lily Allen
- Linda Gail Lewis
- Linda Thompson
- Linval Thompson
- Lionel Richie
- Lisa Hannigan
- Lisa Marie Presley
- Lisa Stansfield
- Lissie
- Little Boots
- Little Dragon
- Little Jackie
- Little Roy
- Little Simz
- Liza Minnelli
- Lizz Wright
- Lloyd Cole
- London Grammar
- Lonnie Donegan
- Lorde
- Los de Abajo
- Lou Reed
- Lou Reed and Metallica
- Loudon Wainwright III
- Louise Marshall
- Love with Arthur Lee
- Low
- LP
- Luciano
- Lucinda Williams
- Lucius
- Lucky Dube
- Lucy Pearl
- Ludacris
- Ludovico Einaudi
- Luisa Sobral
- Lulu James
- Lulu
- Lulu & Richard Hawley
- Luther Vandross
- Lykke Li
- Lyle Lovett
- Lynched
- Lynden David Hall
- Lynden David Hall & Hinda Hicks

== M ==
- Mandy, Indiana
- M People
- M. Ward
- M.I.A
- M.J. Cole
- MC Solaar
- MGMT
- Mable John
- Macy Gray
- Madeleine Peyroux
- Madisen Ward and the Mama Bear
- Madness
- Magazine
- Mahotella Queens
- Maldita Vecindad Y Los Hijos Del Quinto Patio
- Mama Rosin
- Manic Street Preachers
- Mansun
- Manu Chao
- Marc Almond
- Maria McKee
- Marian Hill
- Marianne Faithfull
- Marianne Faithfull with the Electra Strings
- Marina and the Diamonds
- Mariza
- Mark Morrison
- Mark Ronson
- Marques Toliver
- Martha Wainwright
- Martha and the Vandellas
- Martin Hayes & Dennis Cahill
- Martin Simpson
- Martina Topley-Bird
- Marty Stuart
- Mary Chapin Carpenter
- Mary Coughlan
- Mary J. Blige
- Mary Wilson
- Massive Attack
- Massive Attack with Elizabeth Fraser
- Massive Attack with Tracey Thorn and Ben Watt
- Mastodon
- Matisyahu
- Mattafix
- Matthew Jay
- Matthew Sweet
- Maura O'Connell
- Maverick Sabre
- Mavis Staples
- Max Richter
- Maxi Jazz
- Maxwell
- Maxïmo Park
- Mayra Andrade
- Mazzy Star
- Mbongwana Star
- McAlmont and Butler
- McKay
- Me Phi Me
- Melanie C
- Melissa Etheridge
- Melody Gardot
- Melt Yourself Down
- Mercury Rev
- Merz
- Metallica
- Metric
- Metronomy
- Mica Paris
- Michael Kiwanuka
- Michael McDonald
- Mick Hucknall
- Midlake
- Midnight Oil
- Miguel
- Miike Snow
- Mika
- Mike Henderson
- Mike Oldfield
- Mike Scott
- Miles Kane
- Mini Mansions
- Mirel Wagner
- Mirwais
- Missy Elliott
- Misteeq
- MØ
- Moby
- Mokoomba
- Moloko
- Mona
- Monkey: Journey to the West
- Moonchild Sanelly
- Morcheeba
- Morphine
- Morrissey
- Mory Kanté
- Mos Def
- Mose Allison
- Mr. Hudson & The Library
- Ms. Dynamite
- Mull Historical Society
- Mumford & Sons
- Muse
- Musiq Soulchild
- Mutya Buena
- My Morning Jacket
- Mylo
- Mélanie De Biasio

== N ==
- Nadia Reid
- Nanci Griffith
- Natacha Atlas
- Natalie Duncan
- Natalie Imbruglia
- Natalie Merchant
- Natalie Prass
- Nate James
- Nathaniel Rateliff
- Nathaniel Rateliff and The Night Sweats
- Natty
- Nação Zumbi
- Neil Cowley Trio
- Neil Diamond
- Neil Finn
- Neil Sedaka
- Nellie McKay
- Nelly Furtado
- Neneh Cherry
- New Order
- New York Dolls
- Nick Cave and the Bad Seeds
- Nick Cave
- Nick Cave & Shane MacGowan
- Nick Lowe
- Nick Lowe and the Impossible Birds
- Nick Mason
- Nick Mulvey
- Nickel Creek
- Nicky Wire
- Nicole Atkins
- Nigel Kennedy
- Night Beds
- Nile Rodgers
- Nitin Sawhney
- Noah and the Whale
- Noel Gallagher's High Flying Birds
- Noel Gallagher
- Noisettes
- Nona Hendryx
- Norah Jones
- Norma Waterson
- Novice Theory
- Nu Colours
- Nubya Garcia

== O ==
- OMD
- Oasis
- Ocean Colour Scene
- Ocean Colour Scene with Paul Weller and Rico
- Odetta
- Ojos de Brujo
- Old Crow Medicine Show
- Oleta Adams
- Olivia Harrison
- Olodum
- Omar
- Omara Portuondo
- Omara Portuondo with Cachaíto López
- Operator Please
- Orbital
- Orchestra Baobab
- oslo.
- Oumou Sangaré
- Oysterband
- Ozomatli
- Ozzy Osbourne

== P ==
- PJ Harvey
- Princess Nokia
- Page & Plant
- Page and Plant
- Pajama Club
- Palma Violets
- Paloma Faith
- Paolo Nutini
- Papa Wemba
- Pape et Cheikh
- Parliament-Funkadelic
- Passenger
- Pat Metheny
- Patti Smith
- Patty Griffin with Robert Plant
- Paul Brady
- Paul Buchanan
- Paul Carrack
- Paul Heaton
- Paul Jones
- Paul McCartney
- Paul Rodgers
- Paul Simon
- Paul Weller
- Paul Weller with Carleen Anderson and Jhelisa Anderson
- Paul Westerberg
- Paul Young
- Paula Santoro
- Pauline Black & Arthur 'Gaps' Hendrickson
- Pauline Taylor
- Pavement
- Peace
- Pearl Jam
- Peggy Seeger
- Pelvis
- Pendulum
- Pentangle
- Percy Sledge
- Pet Shop Boys
- Pete Molinari
- Pete Townshend
- Peter Blake
- Peter Gabriel
- Petula Clark
- Phil Alvin
- Phil Campbell
- Phil Collins
- Phoenix
- PiL
- Pietra Montecorvino
- Pink Martini
- Pixies
- Placebo
- Plan B
- Plantlife
- Pokey LaFarge and the South City Three
- Polar Bear
- Poliça
- Polly Jean Harvey
- Pops Staples
- Porno for Pyros
- Portishead
- Pozer
- Pretenders
- Primal Scream
- Priscilla Ahn
- Professor Green
- Protoje
- Public Image Ltd
- Pulp
- Punch Brothers

== Q ==
- Queen Emily
- Queens of the Stone Age

== R ==
- R. Kelly
- R.E.M.
- Radiohead
- Radkey
- Raghu Dixit
- Rahsaan Patterson
- Rainer Ptacek
- Randy Crawford
- Randy Newman
- Raphael Saadiq
- Raul Midón
- Ray Davies
- Ray Davies & Mumford & Sons
- Ray LaMontagne & the Pariah Dogs
- Ray LaMontagne
- Razorlight
- Red Hot Chili Peppers
- Red Snapper
- Reef
- Regina Spektor
- Ren Harvieu
- Reprazent
- Reverend and The Makers
- Rhiannon Giddens
- Richard Ashcroft
- Richard Bona
- Richard Hawley
- Richard Swift
- Richard Thompson
- Richard Thompson with Danny Thompson
- Rickie Lee Jones
- Rico Rodriguez
- Rico
- Rilo Kiley
- Rita Ora
- Rival Sons
- Robbie Robertson
- Robbie Williams
- Robert Palmer
- Robert Plant and the Extraordinaries
- Robert Plant
- Robert Plant & Alison Krauss with T-Bone Burnett
- Robert Plant & the Strange Sensation
- Robert Randolph and the Family Band
- Robert Wyatt
- Robin Gibb
- Robyn Hitchcock
- Rod Argent
- Roddy Frame
- Rodney Crowell
- Rodrigo y Gabriela
- Rodriguez
- Roger Cicero
- Roger Daltrey
- Roger McGuinn
- Roger Taylor
- Róisín Murphy
- Rokia Traoré
- Roland Gift
- Rollins Band
- Ron Sexsmith
- Roni Size
- Roni Size & Reprazent
- Ronnie Spector
- Ronnie Wood
- Roots Manuva
- Rosie Lowe
- Rosanne Cash
- Rox
- Roy Harper
- Royal Blood
- Ruby Turner
- Ruby Turner & Louise Marshall
- Ruby Turner & Rico Rodriguez
- Ruby
- Rubén González
- Rudimental
- Rufus Wainwright
- Rumer
- Rumer & Jimmy Webb
- Rustin' Man
- Ry Cooder
- Ryan Adams
- Róisín Murphy

== S ==
- SOAK
- SOIL&"PIMP"SESSIONS
- Sade
- ShyGirl
- Sienna Spiro
- Shania Twain
- Saint Etienne
- Saint & Campbell
- Salif Keita
- Sam Brown
- Sam Brown & Sam Moore
- Sam Carter
- Sam Fender
- Sam Moore
- Sam Smith
- Sam Sparro
- Sandie Shaw
- Santana
- Santigold
- Santogold (now known as Santigold)
- Sara Tavares
- Sarah McLachlan
- Savages
- Scissor Sisters
- Scott Matthews
- Scott Walker
- Screaming Trees
- Seal
- Sean Paul
- Seasick Steve
- Seinabo Sey
- Series Highlights: PJ Harvey
- Seu Jorge
- Seun Kuti & Egypt 80
- Sevara Nazarkhan
- Shabba Ranks
- Shaggy
- Shakira
- Shane MacGowan
- Shara Nelson
- Sharleen Spiteri
- Sharon Jones & The Dap-Kings
- Sharon Shannon
- Sharon Van Etten
- Shaun Escoffery
- Shaun Ryder
- Shawn Colvin
- Sheila Chandra
- Shelby Lynne
- Sheryl Crow
- Shingai Shoniwa
- Shivaree
- Shola Ama with The London Community Gospel Choir
- Shura
- Shy Child
- Sia
- Sierra Maestra
- Sigrid
- Sigur Rós
- Silversun Pickups
- Simon Pegg
- Simple Kid
- Simply Red
- Sinéad O'Connor
- Siouxsie Sioux
- Slaves
- Sir John Dankworth
- Sir Tom Jones
- Six By Seven
- Sixto Rodriguez
- Skepta
- Skin
- Skunk Anansie
- Slash
- Slaves
- Sleaford Mods
- Sleater-Kinney
- Smokey Robinson
- Smokey Robinson with Eric Clapton
- Snow Patrol
- So Solid Crew
- Solange
- Solomon Burke
- Someday World
- Son of Dave
- Songhoy Blues
- Sonic Youth
- Sonny Landreth
- Souad Massi
- Soul Asylum
- Soul II Soul
- Soulsavers
- Soundgarden
- Sounds of Blackness
- Spaghetti Western Orchestra
- Spearhead
- Spector
- Spiritualized
- Spooner Oldham
- Squeeze
- St. Vincent
- Staff Benda Bilili
- Stan Tracey
- Starsailor
- Steep Canyon Rangers
- Stephanie Dosen
- Stephen Stills
- Stephin Merritt aka The Magnetic Fields
- Stereo MCs
- Stereolab
- Stereophonics
- Steve Earle and the Dukes
- Steve Earle
- Steve Martin And The Steep Canyon Rangers
- Steve Miller Band
- Steve Tilston
- Steve White
- Steve Winwood
- Stewart Copeland
- Sting
- Stormzy
- Stornoway
- Strange Sensation
- Streets
- Sturgill Simpson
- Suede
- SugaRush Beat Company
- Sugababes
- Suggs
- Super Furry Animals
- Supergrass
- Superstar
- Susana Baca
- Suzanne Rhatigan
- Suzanne Vega
- Sväng
- Sway DaSafo

== T ==
- T-Bone Burnett
- TV on the Radio
- Taj Mahal
- Taj Mahal & Toumani Diabaté
- Tame Impala
- Tanya Donnelly
- Taraf de Haïdouks
- Tasmin Archer
- Taylor Swift
- Teddy Thompson
- Teenage Fanclub
- Television
- Terem Quartet
- Terri Walker
- Terry Hall
- Texas
- The 1st Battalion Scots Guards
- The 1975
- The Afghan Whigs
- The Agitator
- The Arcs
- The Auteurs
- The Automatic
- The Bad Plus
- The Be Good Tanyas
- The Beach Boys
- The Beautiful South
- The Beautiful South and Jill Scott
- The Beta Band
- The Big Chris Barber Band
- The Big Pink
- The Black Crowes with Stereophonics
- The Black Dyke Mills Band
- The Black Eyed Peas
- The Black Keys
- The Blind Boys of Alabama
- The Blockheads with Robbie Williams and Suggs
- The Blue Nile
- The Bluetones
- The Boo Radleys
- The Brand New Heavies
- The Bravery
- The Burns Unit
- The Cardigans
- The Charlatans
- The Chemical Brothers
- The Chieftains
- The Christians
- The Civil Wars
- The Coral
- The Corrs
- The Cranberries
- The Cribs
- The Cure
- The Dandy Warhols
- The Daniel Lanois Band
- The Darkness
- The Datsuns
- The Dead Weather
- The Decemberists
- The Delgados
- The Desert Sessions featuring Josh Homme and PJ Harvey
- The Distillers
- The Divine Comedy
- The Dresden Dolls
- The Dubliners
- The Duke Spirit
- The Duke and the King
- The El Gusto Orchestra Of Algiers
- The Electric Soft Parade
- The Fall
- The Flaming Lips
- The Fratellis
- The Fun Lovin' Criminals
- The Futureheads
- The Gaslight Anthem
- The Go! Team
- The Go-Betweens
- The Good, the Bad & the Queen
- The Gutter Twins
- The Handsome Family
- The Hives
- The Hoax
- The Hold Steady
- The Horrors
- The Hot Club of Cowtown
- The Hot Sardines
- The Hours
- The Human League
- The Imagined Village
- The Jayhawks
- The Jesus and Mary Chain
- The Jim Jones Revue
- The Jolly Boys
- The Killers
- The Kills
- The Kinks
- The Kooks
- The Last Shadow Puppets
- The Lee Thompson Ska Orchestra
- The Lemon Twigs
- The Libertines
- The Lightning Seeds
- The London Community Gospel Choir
- The Lone Bellow
- The Low Anthem
- The Lumineers
- The Maccabees
- The Magic Numbers
- The Magnetic Fields
- The Mavericks
- The Mescaleros
- The Mike Flowers Pops
- The Mummers
- The National
- The Neville Brothers
- The Nightwatchman
- The O'Jays
- The Only Ones
- The Ordinary Boys
- The Orwells
- The Phoenix Foundation
- The Pierces
- The Pigeon Detectives
- The Pipes and Drums, 1st Battalion Scots Guards
- The Polyphonic Spree
- The Pretenders
- The Proclaimers
- The Raconteurs
- The Rakes
- The Rockingbirds
- The Roots
- The Seahorses
- The Secret Sisters
- The Silver Seas
- The Smashing Pumpkins
- The Soul Rebels Brass Band
- The Soundtrack of Our Lives
- The Spatial AKA Orchestra
- The Specials
- The Spinto Band
- The Staves
- The Stereophonics
- The Streets
- The Strokes
- The Strypes
- The Tallest Man on Earth
- The The
- The Thrills
- The Ting Tings
- The Tony Rich Project
- The Tyrrel Corporation
- The Unthanks
- The Vaccines
- The Verve
- The View
- The Vines
- The Von Bondies
- The Vulgar Boatmen
- The War On Drugs
- The Waterboys
- The Watson Twins
- The Webb Brothers
- The Weeknd
- The White Buffalo
- The White Stripes
- The Who
- The Zombies
- The Zutons
- The xx
- Thea Gilmore
- Thom Yorke
- Tift Merritt
- Tiger Lillies
- Tiggs da Author
- Tigran Hamasyan
- Tim Finn & Richard Thompson
- Tim Rose
- Tinariwen
- Tindersticks
- Tinie Tempah
- Tinie Tempah with Eric Turner
- Tobias Jesso Jr.
- Tom Baxter
- Tom Chaplin
- Tom Hickox
- Tom Jones
- Tom McRae
- Tom Odell
- Tom Petty and the Heartbreakers
- Tony Bennett
- Tony Joe White
- Tony Visconti
- Toots Hibbert
- Toots and the Maytals
- Tori Amos
- Tori Amos with The Black Dyke Mills Band
- Toumani Diabaté
- Tracey Thorn and Ben Watt
- Tracey Thorn
- Tracy Chapman
- Traffic
- Travis
- Trey Songz
- Tricky
- Tricky with PJ Harvey
- Trisha Yearwood
- Trombone Shorty
- Tweet
- Two Door Cinema Club

== U ==
- U2
- UB40
- US3
- Ultra Naté
- Ultrasound
- Unbelievable Truth
- Union Station
- Ute Lemper
- VV Brown

== V ==
- Valerie June
- Vampire Weekend
- Van Morrison
- Van Morrison and Linda Gail Lewis
- Vance Joy
- Various Cruelties
- Vashti Bunyan
- Villagers
- Vince Gill
- Vintage Trouble
- Vivian Green
- Violet Grohl

== W ==
- Wanda Jackson
- Wasia Project
- Westside Cowboy
- Warpaint
- Warren Zevon
- Was (Not Was)
- We Are Scientists
- Whipping Boy
- White Denim
- White Lies
- White Rabbits
- Wilco
- Wild Beasts
- Wilko Johnson
- William Bell
- William Elliott Whitmore
- Willie Nelson
- Willis
- Willis Earl Beal
- Willy Mason
- Willy Moon
- Witness
- Wolf Alice
- Wolfmother
- World Party
- Wretch 32
- Wyclef Jean and the Refugee Camp
- Wynonna Judd
- Yamato - The Drummers of Japan

== Y ==
- Yannis and the Yaw
- Yasmin Levy
- Yasmine Hamdan
- Yeah Yeah Yeahs
- Years & Years
- Yeasayer
- Yoav
- Yoko Ono
- Yola
- Young Knives
- Young the Giant
- Youssou N'Dour
- Yuck
- Yungchen Lhamo
- Yusuf

== Z ==
- ZZ Top
- Zap Mama
- Zara McFarlane
- Zero 7
- Zola Jesus
- Zwan

== See also ==
- List of Later... with Jools Holland episodes
