= List of Later... with Jools Holland episodes =

Later... with Jools Holland is a contemporary British music television show hosted by Jools Holland. A spin-off of The Late Show, it has been running in short series since 1992 and features a mixture of both established and new musical artists, from solo performers to bands and larger ensembles. As part of BBC Two's late-night line-up, it is usually aired as a 45-60 minute programme at around 10-11 pm to midnight. From 2008 to 2018, in addition to the traditional pre-recorded hour-long episode shown later in the week, a live Tuesday version was transmitted in a half-hour evening slot on BBC Two and featured the same artist line-up as in the former one.

Series overview:

Series 1 | Series 2 | Series 3 | Series 4 | Series 5 | Series 6 | Series 7 | Series 8 | Series 9 | Series 10 | Series 11 | Series 12 | Series 13 | Series 14 | Series 15 | Series 16 | Series 17 | Series 18 | Series 19 | Series 20 | Series 21 | Series 22 | Series 23 | Series 24 | Series 25 | Series 26 | Series 27 | Series 28 | Series 29 | Series 30 | Series 31 | Series 32 | Series 33 | Series 34 | Series 35 | Series 36 | Series 37 | Series 38 | Series 39 | Series 40 | Series 41 | Series 42 | Series 43 | Series 44 | Series 45 | Series 46 | Series 47 | Series 48 | Series 49 | Series 50 | Series 51 | Series 52 | Series 53 | Series 54 | Series 55 | Series 56 | Series 57 | Series 58 | Series 59 | Series 60 | Series 61 | Series 62 | Series 63 | Series 64 | Series 65 | Series 66 | Series 67 | Series 68 | Series 69 |

Show	Air date	Guests
== Series 1 == (N.B. shown Thursdays at 11:55 pm on BBC Two.)
1x01	8 October 1992	The Neville Brothers / The Christians / Nu Colours / D'Influence
1x02	15 October 1992	k.d. lang / The Rockingbirds / Loudon Wainwright III / Dwight Yoakam
1x03	22 October 1992	Baaba Maal / Tasmin Archer / Oumou Sangaré / Was (Not Was) / Smokey Robinson
1x04	29 October 1992	Carmel / Indigo Girls / Mary Chapin Carpenter / Katie Webster / Barbara Thompson
1x05	5 November 1992	Inspiral Carpets / The Tyrrel Corporation / David Gray / Joan Baez / John Martyn / Andy Sheppard
1x06	12 November 1992	Denim / Nick Cave & Shane MacGowan / En Vogue / John Prine
1x07	19 November 1992	Television / John Cale / Mary Coughlan / DC Basehead
1x08	26 November 1992	Sonic Youth / Shabba Ranks / Suzanne Rhatigan / Apache Indian
1x09	3 December 1992	Morrissey / Tori Amos / Loyko / Chris Rea / Matthew Sweet / Sonny Landreth
1x10	10 December 1992	Simply Red / Kirsty MacColl / Ann Peebles / Me Phi Me
== Series 2 == (N.B. Shown Fridays at 11:15 pm on BBC Two.)
2x01	7 May 1993	PJ Harvey / Alice in Chains / Vince Gill / Sounds of Blackness / Maria McKee
2x02	14 May 1993	Leonard Cohen / Aztec Camera / Jellyfish / Shara Nelson
2x03	21 May 1993	Robert Plant / Teenage Fanclub / Buddy Guy / Gallon Drunk / Nanci Griffith
2x04	4 June 1993	Suede / Soul Asylum / Bryan Ferry / Fishbone / Ed Alleyne-Johnson
2x05	11 June 1993	The The / Charles & Eddie / Chaka Demus & Pliers / The Jayhawks / Maria McKee / Black Umfolosi
2x06	18 June 1993	The Kinks / Belly / The Auteurs / Neneh Cherry / La Polla Records / Aimee Mann / Maldita Vecindad Y Los Hijos Del Quinto Patio
2x07	25 June 1993	Midnight Oil / Porno for Pyros / Oleta Adams / Saint Etienne / Grant Lee Buffalo
2x08	2 July 1993	Lenny Kravitz / Gloria Estefan / Björk / Tim Finn & Richard Thompson / Paul Westerberg
2x09	9 July 1993	Paul Weller / Clannad / The Jesus and Mary Chain / A.J. Croce / Lena Fiagbe
2x10	16 July 1993	Al Green / Squeeze / Richard Thompson / Rainer Ptacek / Efua
== Jools' 1st Annual Hootenanny ==
	1 January 1994	Sting / Dina Carroll / Paul Young / Chaka Demus & Pliers / Gipsy Kings / Freddie McGregor / Junior Brown
== Series 3 == (N.B. shown Saturdays at 10:25 pm on BBC Two.)
3x01	7 May 1994	Elvis Costello / Counting Crows / Sheila Chandra / Honky
3x02	14 May 1994	Traffic / Nick Cave / Galliano / Morphine / Cassandra Wilson
3x03	21 May 1994	Pretenders / Evan Dando / Jonathan Richman / David McComb & The Red Ponies / Angélique Kidjo / Erasure
3x04	28 May 1994	David Byrne / Seal / Cocteau Twins / Cracker / Ali Farka Toure
3x05	4 June 1994	Bonnie Raitt & Paul Brady / Jimmie Vaughan / Jah Wobble & The Invaders of the Heart with The Cranberries / G. Love & Special Sauce
3x06	11 June 1994	Crowded House / The Auteurs / Aswad / The Cranberries
3x07	9 July 1994	Johnny Cash & June Carter Cash / Mazzy Star / Carleen Anderson / Pops Staples
== Series 4 == (N.B. Shown Saturdays at 10:25 pm on BBC Two.)
4x01	5 November 1994	Suede / Terry Hall / Youssou N'Dour / JJ Cale / Sharon Shannon
4x02	12 November 1994	INXS / Percy Sledge / Portishead / Edwyn Collins / Sarah McLachlan
4x03	19 November 1994	Page & Plant / Elastica / Les Négresses Vertes / June Tabor / Terem Quartet
4x04	26 November 1994	M People / Nick Lowe and the Impossible Birds / Ben Harper & The Innocent Criminals / Le Mystère des Voix Bulgares
4x05	3 December 1994	The Beautiful South / Eddi Reader / Earthling / Saint & Campbell / The Hoax / Courtney Pine
4x06	10 December 1994	Oasis / Spearhead / Shawn Colvin / Mary Chapin Carpenter / Mike Scott / Zap Mama
== Jools' 2nd Annual Hootenanny ==
	1 January 1995	Blur / Steve Winwood / Shane MacGowan / Kirsty MacColl / Eddi Reader / Ruby Turner
== Series 5 ==
5x01	13 May 1995	Massive Attack with Tracey Thorn and Ben Watt / Marianne Faithfull with the Electra Strings / Hole / The Mavericks / Dionne Farris
5x02	20 May 1995	PJ Harvey / Tindersticks / Sheryl Crow / Moby / D'Influence
5x03	27 May 1995	Radiohead / Elvis Costello / Chris Isaak / Boy George / Lucky Dube
5x04	3 June 1995	Supergrass / Paul Weller with Carleen Anderson and Jhelisa Anderson / Joan Armatrading / Scott Walker / Baaba Maal / The Vulgar Boatmen
5x05	10 June 1995	Dusty Springfield / Sinéad O'Connor / McAlmont and Butler / Alison Moyet / Whipping Boy / Laurie Anderson
5x06	17 June 1995	Björk with the Electra Strings / Tricky / The Boo Radleys / Graham Parker / Pete Townshend / Olodum / Isaac Hayes
== Series 6 ==
6x01	4 November 1995	D'Angelo / Black Grape / Melissa Etheridge / Gregory Isaacs / Suggs
6x02	12 November 1995	Morrissey / Pulp / Billie Ray Martin / Finn / Randy Newman / Luther Vandross
6x03	19 November 1995	Blur / Garth Brooks / Soul II Soul / Aimee Mann / Justin Vali Trio
6x04	26 November 1995	The Human League / Emmylou Harris / Cast / Steve Earle / The Daniel Lanois Band / Derek Taylor / Guru with DC Lee
6x05	3 December 1995	David Bowie / Oasis / Ruby / Papa Wemba / Aztec Camera
6x06	9 December 1995	The Charlatans / Van Morrison / Tori Amos with The Black Dyke Mills Band / Buju Banton / Paul Brady / Maura O'Connell
== Jools' 3rd Annual Hootenanny ==
	1 January 1996	The 1st Battalion Scots Guards / Dr. John / Supergrass / Eric Clapton / Alanis Morissette / David McAlmont / Audioweb / The Mike Flowers Pops / Dick Dale / Andy Fairweather Low
== Series 7 ==
7x01	11 May 1996	The Cure / Mark Morrison / Willie Nelson / Tasmin Archer / Sierra Maestra
7x02	18 May 1996	Manic Street Preachers / Hootie and the Blowfish / Salif Keita / Pete Townshend / Maxwell / Ben Folds Five
7x03	25 May 1996	Ocean Colour Scene with Paul Weller and Rico / Ice-T / Everclear / Cowboy Junkies / Morcheeba / The Tony Rich Project
7x04	1 June 1996	Super Furry Animals / Everything but the Girl / Burning Spear / John Martyn / Ron Sexsmith
7x05	8 June 1996	Crowded House / Ash / Patti Smith / Booth and the Bad Angel / Fugees / Richard Thompson with Danny Thompson / Norma Waterson
7x06	15 June 1996	ZZ Top / The Bluetones / Stereolab / Bo Diddley / Nigel Kennedy / Bert Jansch / Altan
== Series 8 ==
8x01	9 November 1996	50th Show with Orbital / Kula Shaker / Joe Cocker / The Blue Nile / Jackson Browne / Nu Colours
8x02	16 November 1996	Metallica / The Beautiful South / Catatonia / Horace Andy / Donovan
8x03	23 November 1996	Baby Bird / John Parish and Polly Jean Harvey / Eddi Reader / Christy Moore / Luciano
8x04	30 November 1996	Screaming Trees / Billy Bragg / Electronic / Neneh Cherry / BR549 / Nitin Sawhney
8x05	7 December 1996	Travis / Tricky with PJ Harvey / Sting / Lionel Richie / Lewis Taylor
8x06	14 December 1996	Suede / Beth Orton / Alexander O'Neal / Reef / Ray Davies / Anúna
== Jools' 4th Annual Hootenanny ==
	1 January 1997	Manic Street Preachers / Paul Weller / Lighthouse Family / Mick Hucknall / Cassandra Wilson / Mike Henderson / Gilson Lavis / Steve White / Charlie Watts / Kenickie
== Series 9 ==
9x01	10 May 1997	David Byrne and Morcheeba / Beck / The Brand New Heavies / Dru Hill / Rubén González / Rollins Band
9x02	17 May 1997	Steve Winwood / Stereophonics / Finley Quaye / Counting Crows / James Taylor / Buena Vista Social Club with Ry Cooder
9x03	24 May 1997	The Charlatans / Gorky's Zygotic Mynci / Khaled / Boz Scaggs / Tony Bennett / Wynonna Judd
9x04	31 May 1997	Foo Fighters / Radiohead / World Party / Kwesi / k.d. lang / Alison Krauss & Union Station
9x05	7 June 1997	Primal Scream / Suzanne Vega / Placebo / Del Amitri / Jhelisa / Chris Smither
9x06	14 June 1997	Echo & the Bunnymen / Massive Attack / Mansun / Roger McGuinn / Erykah Badu / Kathryn Tickell / Huutajat (The Screaming Men)
== Series 10 ==
10x01	1 November 1997	The Verve / Rickie Lee Jones / UB40 / Roni Size / Jewel
10x02	8 November 1997	Embrace / M People / Cast / Blackstreet / Larla O'Lionard
10x03	15 November 1997	Aerosmith / Black Grape / Texas / Lighthouse Family / Phil Campbell
10x04	22 November 1997	The Seahorses / Portishead / Faithless / Tim Rose / Tanya Donnelly / Pauline Taylor
10x05	29 November 1997	Paul Weller / Björk / Afro Celt Sound System / Superstar / Carleen Anderson
10x06	6 December 1997	Ocean Colour Scene / Jamiroquai / Cornershop / Steve Earle and the Dukes / Cath Coffey / Kristin Hersh
== Jools' 5th Annual Hootenanny ==
	31 December 1997	B.B. King / Blur / Shaun Ryder / Gabrielle / Jewel / The Fun Lovin' Criminals / Bentley Rhythm Ace. (Studio guests include; Michael Eavis, Chris Evans, Jo Brand, Sam Brown, Kathy Burke, David Gilmour, Ainsley Harriott, Martine McCutcheon, Rowland Rivron, John Simm, John Thomson and Richard Wilson)
== Series 11 ==
11x01	17 April 1998	Spiritualized / Bernard Butler / Billie Myers / Lynden David Hall / Jimmy Webb
11x02	24 April 1998	James / Catatonia / Imani Coppola / Unbelievable Truth / George Benson
11x03	1 May 1998	Pulp / Pelvis / Lenny Kravitz / Air / Martin Hayes & Dennis Cahill
11x04	8 May 1998	Page and Plant / Natalie Imbruglia / Gomez / Nick Cave and the Bad Seeds / Beth Orton
11x05	12 May 1998	The Smashing Pumpkins / Simply Red / Tricky
11x06	19 May 1998	Tori Amos / The Jesus and Mary Chain / Ultrasound / Yungchen Lhamo / Ultra Naté / Andrew Roachford
== Later's 75th Episode (shown Friday at 11:30 PM) ==
12x01	16 October 1998	Manic Street Preachers / Eels / Beverley Knight / Ian Dury & the Blockheads / Björk
== Series 12 ==
12x02	23 October 1998	Hole / Marc Almond / Rufus Wainwright / Neil Finn / Red Snapper
12x03	30 October 1998	The Afghan Whigs / Alvin Youngblood Hart / Fun Lovin' Criminals / Natalie Merchant / Mike Oldfield
12x04	6 November 1998	R.E.M.
12x05	13 November 1998	Ladysmith Black Mambazo / Robbie Williams / Bonnie Raitt / Placebo / Trisha Yearwood
12x06	20 November 1998	The Beautiful South / Ash / PJ Harvey / Dr. John
12x07	4 December 1998	Herbie Hancock / Culture Club / Faithless / Lucinda Williams / Asian Dub Foundation
12x08	11 December 1998	Ronnie Spector / Elliott Smith / Massive Attack with Elizabeth Fraser / Blondie / Roddy Frame / The Divine Comedy / Six By Seven
== Jools' 6th Annual Hootenanny ==
	31 December 1998	Tom Jones / The Corrs / Gomez / Sharleen Spiteri / All Saints / Catatonia. (Studio Guests include; Kathy Burke, Miranda Richardson, Michael and Jean Eavis, Bella Freud, Kelly Holmes, John Thomson, Roni Size and John Sessions.)
== Series 13 ==
13x01	16 April 1999	Blur / Van Morrison / Wilco / Natacha Atlas / Candi Staton
13x02	23 April 1999	Catatonia / Kula Shaker / Tom Petty and the Heartbreakers / Paul Westerberg Urban Species
13x03	30 April 1999	Mercury Rev / Skunk Anansie / Robert Palmer / Macy Gray
13x04	7 May 1999	Travis / Texas / Stereophonics / Beth Orton / The Roots
13x05	14 May 1999	Garbage / Suede / Witness / John Cale / Ozomatli
13x06	21 May 1999	The Cardigans / The Mavericks / The Pretenders / Gay Dad / Gang Starr / Steve Earle with the Del McCoury Band
== Series 14 ==
14x01	16 October 1999	James / Ben Harper / Gabrielle / Bryan Ferry / Breakbeat Era
14x02	23 October 1999	The Charlatans / Oslo / Shelby Lynne / Jeff Beck / Bernard Butler
14x03	30 October 1999	Madness / Ian Dury / Richard Thompson / Tori Amos / Cheikh Lô / Pavement / Jimmy Scott
14x04	6 November 1999	Sir Paul McCartney / Travis / Dan Penn / Spooner Oldham / Shola Ama with The London Community Gospel Choir / The Flaming Lips
14x05	14 November 1999	The Lightning Seeds / Foo Fighters / Ian Brown / Incognito / Taj Mahal & Toumani Diabaté
14x06	20 November 1999	Beck / Mary J. Blige / Ocean Colour Scene / Cousteau / Merz
14x07	28 November 1999	Supergrass / Melanie C / Holly Johnson / Campag Velocet
14x08	4 December 1999	David Bowie / Diana Krall / Elastica / Brand New Heavies
== Jools' 7th Annual & Millennium Special Hootenanny ==
	30 December 1999	Bryan Ferry / Van Morrison / Jamiroquai / Chrissie Hynde / Ronnie Wood / Electra Strings / Skin / Chris Difford / Travis / Lonnie Donegan. (Studio guests include; Harry Enfield, Alan Davies, Paul Whitehouse, Charlie Higson, Rowland Rivron, John Thomson, Michael Eavis, Bella Freud, Bill Paterson, Joe Absolom, Tamzin Outhwaite, John Sessions, Meera Syal, Kulvinder Ghir, Nina Wadia, Sanjeev Bhaskar, Jo Wood, John Gordon Sinclair, Clare Grogan, Holly Johnson, Natasha Little, Ralf Little, Angela Griffin, Lisa Faulkner, Nicola Stephenson, Mark Flanagan, Simon Pegg and Jessica Stevenson.)
== Later's 100th Episode (shown Saturday at 10:30 PM) ==
15x01	15 April 2000	Paul Weller / Moloko / Liberace / Idlewild / Kirsty MacColl
== Series 15 ==
15x02	22 April 2000	David Gray / Death In Vegas / Eagle-Eye Cherry / LSK / Neneh Cherry / Super Furry Animals
15x03	29 April 2000	Embrace / Doves / Lynden David Hall & Hinda Hicks / Bobby Whitlock & Eric Clapton / Ute Lemper
15x04	6 May 2000	Coldplay / Primal Scream / Youssou N'Dour / Bill Wyman's Rhythm Kings / Odetta
15x05	13 May 2000	Joe Strummer and The Mescaleros / Angie Stone / The Delgados / Tracy Chapman / Warren Zevon / Nick Mason
15x06	20 May 2000	Lou Reed / Kelis / Broadcast / Kylie Minogue / Bert Jansch / M.J. Cole
== Series 16 ==
16x01	14 October 2000	Finley Quaye / Badly Drawn Boy / Lucy Pearl / The Waterboys / Bebel Gilberto / Tom McRae
16x02	21 October 2000	k.d. lang / Morcheeba / Mansun / The Webb Brothers / Alex Lloyd / Lemmy
16x03	28 October 2000	Blur / Roni Size & Reprazent / The Go-Betweens / Alabama 3 / Abdullah Ibrahim Trio / Lionel Richie
16x04	4 November 2000	Texas / Artful Dodger / Courtney Pine / Lynden David Hall / Beverley Knight / Shivaree / Kelly Joe Phelps / William Bell
16x05	11 November 2000	All Saints / Taj Mahal / Sade / Grandaddy / Stephin Merritt aka The Magnetic Fields
16x06	18 November 2000	The Beautiful South / Jill Scott / Dido / Kelly Jones / Kimmo Pohjonen / Jay Kay
16x07	25 November 2000	Wyclef Jean and the Refugee Camp / Emmylou Harris / Joi / Georgie Fame / Mirwais
16x08	2 December 2000	Van Morrison and Linda Gail Lewis / Robbie Williams / Guru's Jazzmatazz with Herbie Hancock, Angie Stone and Craig David / At the Drive In / John Hiatt
== Jools' 8th Annual Hootenanny ==
	31 December 2000	The 1st Battalion Scots Guards / Ray Davies / Joe Brown / Gary Brooker / Jane Horrocks / Lionel Richie / Mick Hucknall / Jools Holland's Rhythm and Blues Orchestra / Kelly Jones / The Stereophonics / Craig David / Róisín Murphy / Coldplay.
== Series 17 ==
17x01	13 April 2001	The Black Crowes with Stereophonics / Calexico
17x02	20 April 2001	Starsailor / Stereo MCs / The Blockheads with Robbie Williams and Suggs / Goldfrapp / Blind Boys Of Alabama
17x03	27 April 2001	Ash / Anastacia / Musiq Soulchild / Cachaíto López / Ibrahim Ferrer & Omara Portuondo / Colin Blunstone & Rod Argent (from The Zombies)
17x04	4 May 2001	R.E.M. / India.Arie / Orbital / Clearlake / Baaba Maal / Ron Sexsmith
17x05	11 May 2001	Nick Cave and the Bad Seeds / Neil Finn / Cesária Évora / Shaggy
17x06	18 May 2001	Nelly Furtado / James / Matthew Jay / Buju Banton / Kate Rusby / Tiger Lillies / Rodney Crowell
== Series 18 ==
18x01	12 October 2001	PJ Harvey / Kelis / Spiritualized / Dr. John / Nick Lowe
18x02	19 October 2001	New Order / Roots Manuva / Michael McDonald / Zero 7 / Ryan Adams
18x03	26 October 2001	Eels / Pulp / Jack Bruce / Cheb Mami / Sam Moore
18x04	2 November 2001	Travis / Alicia Keys / Mercury Rev / Kosheen / Doudou Cissoko
18x05	9 November 2001	The White Stripes / Muse / Super Furry Animals / US3 / Thea Gilmore / Jamiroquai
18x06	16 November 2001	Garbage / The Hives / Macy Gray / The Beta Band / Hall & Oates / Richard Bona
18x07	23 November 2001	The Charlatans / David Gilmour & Mica Paris / Suggs / Dreadzone / Mariza / Mull Historical Society / Paul Carrack
18x08	30 November 2001	Feeder / Belle & Sebastian / Tom Jones / Boz Scaggs / Lighthouse Family / Souad Massi
== Jools' 9th Annual Hootenanny ==
	31 December 2001	David Gray / Edwin Starr / Huey Morgan / Ash / Paul Heaton / David Rotheray / Peter Blake / Sam Brown / Beverley Knight / John Cale / Marc Almond / Ronnie Wood / Slash. (Studio guests include; Damon Hill, Dom Joly, Harry Enfield, Alison Steadman, Ian Hislop, Diarmuid Gavin, Dawn Steele, a Pearly King and Queen, Joe and Sylvia Kennedy, Jackie Murphy, Micky Murphy, Al Murray, Vic Reeves, Jeremy Vine, Rowland Rivron, Jo Wood, Phil Cornwell, John Sessions, Tina Hobley, Jeremy Edwards and Clare Grogan.)
== Series 19 ==
19x01	12 April 2002	Pet Shop Boys / Doves / Cornershop / So Solid Crew / India.Arie
19x02	19 April 2002	The Vines / Del Amitri / Susana Baca / Stereophonics / Badly Drawn Boy
19x03	26 April 2002	Gomez / Patti Smith / Angélique Kidjo / Tweet / Missy Elliott / Jon Spencer Blues Explosion
19x04	3 May 2002	Mary J. Blige / Elvis Costello / The Soundtrack of Our Lives / The Electric Soft Parade / Salif Keita
19x05	10 May 2002	Black Rebel Motorcycle Club / The Hives / Bryan Ferry / Glenn Lewis / The Handsome Family / Misteeq
19x06	17 May 2002	Beverley Knight / Wilco / Eric Burdon / Norah Jones / The Von Bondies / Damon Albarn & Afel Bocoum
== Series 20 ==
20x01	18 October 2002	David Bowie / Ms. Dynamite / Linda Thompson / The Coral / Beenie Man
20x02	25 October 2002	Queens of the Stone Age / Beth Gibbons and Rustin' Man / Paul Weller / Orchestra Baobab / Aqualung / Nickel Creek
20x03	1 November 2002	The Libertines / James Dean Bradfield / Groove Armada / Peter Gabriel / Hill Street Soul
20x04	8 November 2002	David Gray / Tom Jones / Aimee Mann / Youssou N'Dour / The Polyphonic Spree
20x05	15 November 2002	Richard Ashcroft / Tracy Chapman / Craig David / Chris Difford / Streets / Pape et Cheikh
20x06	22 November 2002	Feeder / Alison Moyet / Edwin Starr / David Holmes' Free Association / Sam Brown & Sam Moore / Ruby Turner / Allison Moorer
20x07	29 November 2002	Moby / Badly Drawn Boy / Sugababes / Femi Kuti / Damien Rice / Dave Brubeck / Michael Palin (interview)
20x08	6 December 2002	Coldplay / Foo Fighters / Graham Coxon / The Datsuns / 1 Giant Leap with Robbie Williams, Maxi Jazz, Mahotella Queens & Baaba Maal
== Jools' 10th Annual Hootenanny ==
	31 December 2002	Pulp / Ms. Dynamite / Jimmy Cliff / Solomon Burke / Doves / Chrissie Hynde / Chas & Dave / Robert Plant and the Extraordinaries / Jeff Beck / Tom Jones. (Studio Guests include; Ben Elton, Hugh Laurie, Doon Mackichan, Rob Brydon, Vic Reeves, Dom Joly, Jo Brand, Ronnie Ancona, Gina Bellman, Kate Isitt, Ross Noble, Jonathan Cainer, Rowland Rivron, Phil Cornwell and John Sessions.)
== Series 21 ==
21x01	16 May 2003	Lou Reed / Goldfrapp / Kings of Leon / Ladysmith Black Mambazo / The Vines / McKay
21x02	23 May 2003	Cat Power / Electric Six / The Pretenders / Skin / Taraf de Haïdouks / Robert Palmer / Jane Birkin (interview) / Harry Hill (interview)
21x03	30 May 2003	Stereophonics / The Dandy Warhols / The Blind Boys of Alabama / John Cale / Sevara Nazarkhan / Vivian Green
21x04	6 June 2003	Radiohead / Zwan / Ibrahim Ferrer / Martina Topley-Bird / Bob & Marcia / Pat Metheny
21x05	13 June 2003	Yeah Yeah Yeahs / Grandaddy / Joe Jackson / Steve Winwood / Terri Walker / Celso Fonseca / Beryl Bainbridge (interview) / Dom Joly (interview)
21x06	20 June 2003	Nick Cave and the Bad Seeds / Simply Red / The Thrills / Moloko / The Darkness / Sam Brown
== Series 22 ==
22x01	17 October 2003	R.E.M. / British Sea Power / Buddy Guy / Jamelia / Willis / Yoko Ono (interview)
22x02	24 October 2003	The Desert Sessions featuring Josh Homme and PJ Harvey / Texas / Starsailor / Dizzee Rascal / Kanda Bongo Man / June Tabor
22x03	31 October 2003	Keane / Jane's Addiction / John Cale / Nitin Sawhney / Simple Kid / Julian Joseph
22x04	7 November 2003	Elbow / Amy Winehouse / The Coral / Sean Paul / Paula Santoro / Ludacris / Erin McKeown
22x05	14 November 2003	Travis / The Distillers / Love with Arthur Lee / The Hot Club of Cowtown
22x06	21 November 2003	Franz Ferdinand / 22-20s / Annie Lennox / Courtney Pine & David McAlmont / Ryan Adams / Oumou Sangaré
== Jools' 11th Annual Hootenanny ==
	31 December 2003	Desmond Dekker / Shane MacGowan / Lulu / Texas / Paul Rodgers / Candi Staton / James Dean Bradfield / Sugababes / Junior Senior / Jeff Beck / The Hot Club of Cowtown
== Series 23 ==
23x01	7 May 2004	Basement Jaxx / Norah Jones / Scissor Sisters / David Byrne / Howard Tate
23x02	14 May 2004	Alicia Keys / Snow Patrol / Alanis Morissette / Robert Randolph and the Family Band / Rufus Wainwright / Devendra Banhart
23x03	21 May 2004	Morrissey / The Ordinary Boys / Junior Murvin / The Beta Band / Glenn Tilbrook / Johnny Clarke / Pietra Montecorvino / Linval Thompson / Roger McGough (interview) / Jodie Kidd (interview)
23x04	28 May 2004	PJ Harvey / Ash / Amp Fiddler / Tinariwen / Kanye West / John Martyn / Holland–Dozier–Holland (interview)
23x05	4 June 2004	The Killers / Faithless / Graham Coxon / Ojos de Brujo / Bobby Womack / Tom Jones / The Bad Plus
23x06	11 June 2004	Jet / Toots and the Maytals / Hope of the States / Bebel Gilberto / Eric Bibb & Charlie Musselwhite / Tom Baxter Donna Summer
== Series 24 ==
24x01	1 October 2004	Mary J. Blige / Guru / D'Angelo / Ms. Dynamite / Blackstreet / Erykah Badu / The Roots / Macy Gray / Jill Scott / Alicia Keys / Kanye West / Craig David / India.Arie / Angie Stone / Fugees
24x02	15 October 2004	Green Day / Elvis Costello / Robbie Williams / Estelle / Nellie McKay
24x03	22 October 2004	Embrace / The Cure / The Futureheads / KT Tunstall / Anita Baker / Jackson Browne
24x04	29 October 2004	Nick Cave and the Bad Seeds / Kings of Leon / Manic Street Preachers / Fried / Willy Mason / Brendan Power
24x05	5 November 2004	Razorlight / The Zutons / Mory Kanté / Roni Size / Robin Gibb / Beverley Knight / Joanna Newsom
24x06	12 November 2004	Ian Brown / Mercury Rev / The Beautiful South / k.d. lang / The Bravery / MC Solaar
24x07	19 November 2004	Bloc Party / Keane / Interpol / Old Crow Medicine Show / Ray LaMontagne / Elton John
== Jools' 12th Annual Hootenanny ==
	31 December 2004	Basement Jaxx / Paul Carrack / Eric Clapton / Jamie Cullum / Franz Ferdinand / Ian Hunter / Simon Pegg / Ruby Turner / Amy Winehouse
== Series 25 ==
25x01	13 May 2005	Foo Fighters / Hard-Fi / The Black Eyed Peas / Arcade Fire / Mariza
25x02	20 May 2005	Robert Plant & the Strange Sensation / Athlete / The Go! Team / The Fall / Lhasa / Mose Allison
25x03	27 May 2005	Kaiser Chiefs / John Legend / Van Morrison / Eels / Frank Black / Martha Wainwright
25x04	3 June 2005	New Order / The Coral / Son of Dave / James Blunt / Rufus Wainwright / Faith Evans / Acoustic Ladyland
25x05	10 June 2005	David Sanborn / Plantlife / Beck / M. Ward / Doves / Kubb
25x06	17 June 2005	Billy Preston / Jamiroquai / Coldplay / Amadou & Mariam / The Magic Numbers / Antony and the Johnsons
== Series 26 ==
26x01	21 October 2005	Burt Bacharach / Goldfrapp / Brendan Benson / Editors / Jamie Lidell / Corinne Bailey Rae
26x02	28 October 2005	Los de Abajo / Ms. Dynamite / Mylo / Joseph Arthur / Arctic Monkeys / Lizz Wright
26x03	4 November 2005	Robbie Williams / Mattafix / Cheikh Lô / Vashti Bunyan / Maxïmo Park / KT Tunstall
26x04	11 November 2005	Santana / Bettye LaVette / Sheryl Crow / Paul Weller / Sigur Rós / John Cale
26x05	18 November 2005	Sean Paul / Texas / Salif Keita / Babyshambles / Teddy Thompson
26x06	25 November 2005	Solomon Burke / David Gray / Yasmin Levy / The Rakes / Richard Hawley
== Jools' 13th Annual Hootenanny ==
	31 December 2005	Chris Difford / Corinne Bailey Rae / Goldfrapp / Irma Thomas / James Blunt / Kaiser Chiefs / Kate Rusby with The 1st Battalion Scots Guards / KT Tunstall / Marc Almond / Robin Gibb / Ruby Turner
== Series 27 ==
27x01	5 May 2006	Pearl Jam / Corinne Bailey Rae / Jenny Lewis / The Watson Twins / Jamie Foxx / The Spinto Band / The Zutons
27x02	12 May 2006	Richard Ashcroft / John Fogerty / Matisyahu / We Are Scientists / Rodrigo y Gabriela / Camille
27x03	19 May 2006	Gnarls Barkley / Dr. John / Franz Ferdinand / James Morrison / Snow Patrol
27x04	26 May 2006	Elvis Costello / David Gilmour / Paul Simon / The Streets / Allen Toussaint / Nação Zumbi
27x05	2 June 2006	Hot Chip / David Crosby & Graham Nash / Ojos de Brujo / Dirty Pretty Things / India.Arie / Morrissey
27x06	9 June 2006	Rosanne Cash / Ray Davies / José González / Omar / Primal Scream / Young Knives
27x07	16 June 2006	The Automatic / Gogol Bordello / Dixie Chicks / The Dresden Dolls / The Fratellis / Paolo Nutini
27x08	23 June 2006	Plan B / The Flaming Lips / The Divine Comedy / The Strokes / Raul Midón / Cat Power
== Series 28 == (N.B. Shown Fridays at 11:35 pm on BBC Two; repeated Saturdays.)
28x01	3 November 2006	Amy Winehouse / Muse / Dave Stewart / Gipsy Kings / John Legend / The Raconteurs / Duke Special
28x02	10 November 2006	Kasabian / Smokey Robinson / The View / Jack Allsopp / Jarvis Cocker / Randy Crawford / Damien Rice / Joe Sample
28x03	17 November 2006	Razorlight / The Magic Numbers / Yusuf Islam AKA Cat Stevens / Mika / Christy Moore / Gotan Project / Andy Summers (interview)
28x04	24 November 2006	The Killers / Cherry Ghost / Sara Tavares / Lucinda Williams / George and Giles Martin (interview) / Air Traffic / Lulu & Richard Hawley
28x05	1 December 2006	Red Hot Chili Peppers / Keane / Klaxons / The Be Good Tanyas / Thom Yorke / Bellowhead / Anthony David
28x06	8 December 2006	Tony Bennett / Scissor Sisters / The Hours / The Good, the Bad & the Queen / Scott Matthews / Eric Bibb / Mr. Hudson & The Library
== Jools' 14th Annual Hootenanny ==
	31 December 2006	The Kooks / The Zutons / Seasick Steve / Marc Almond / Paul Weller / Adrian Edmondson / Jools Holland / Madeleine Peyroux / Lily Allen / Sam Moore / Ray LaMontagne / Amy Winehouse / Kate Rusby / James Mass
== Series 29 == (N.B. Shown Fridays at 11:35 pm on BBC Two; repeated Saturdays.)
29x01	4 May 2007	Arctic Monkeys / Bryan Ferry / The Hold Steady / Henri Salvador / Tinariwen / Tony Visconti / CSS (Cansei de Ser Sexy)
29x02	11 May 2007	Travis / Dizzee Rascal / Beverley Knight / Grinderman / Joanna Newsom / Candie Payne / Julien Temple
29x03	18 May 2007	Joe Cocker / Simply Red / Patti Smith / Kate Nash / Cold War Kids / The Cribs
29x04	25 May 2007	Joan Armatrading / Bloc Party / Julie Fowlis / Alex James / LCD Soundsystem / Barbara Orbison / Richard Swift / Wilco / Olivia Harrison
29x05	1 June 2007	Kaiser Chiefs / The White Stripes / Anjani / James Hunter / Pink Martini / Silversun Pickups
29x06	8 June 2007	Sir Paul McCartney / Björk / Editors / Ben Westbeech / Adele / The Nightwatchman / Shy Child
== Series 30 == (N.B. Shown Fridays at 11:35 pm on BBC Two; repeated Saturdays.)
30x01	2 November 2007	Hard-Fi / Siouxsie Sioux / Richard Hawley / Laura Marling / Kaki King / SOIL&"PIMP"SESSIONS
30x02	9 November 2007	Crowded House / Róisín Murphy / Richard Thompson / Battles / Angie Stone / Kurt Elling / Michael Stipe (R.E.M.) (interview)
30x03	16 November 2007	Stereophonics / PJ Harvey / King Creosote / The El Gusto Orchestra Of Algiers / Foals/ Estelle / Robert Plant & Alison Krauss (interview) / Don Henley (interview)
30x04	23 November 2007	Manu Chao / James Blunt / Orchestra Baobab / Duffy / Dion / Kano with Damon Albarn
30x05	30 November 2007	The Who / Common / Josh Ritter / Béla Fleck / Reverend and The Makers / Robert Wyatt / Stephanie Dosen / Larry Harlow's Latin Legends Of Fania
30x06	7 December 2007	David Gray / The Coral / Bassekou Kouyate & Ngoni Ba / Rilo Kiley / Dame Cleo Laine & Sir John Dankworth / Jack Peñate / Charlie Gillett (interview)
30x07	14 December 2007	KT Tunstall / Mutya Buena / Band of Horses / Martin Simpson / Beirut / Gabriella Cilmi / The Ting Tings / Ronnie Wood (interview)
30x08	21 December 2007	Sir Paul McCartney / Dusty Springfield / The White Stripes / Solomon Burke / Norah Jones / Mary J. Blige / (Christmas Special)
== Jools' 15th Annual Hootenanny ==
	31 December 2007	Duffy / Eddie Floyd / Kaiser Chiefs / Lulu / Madness / Sir Paul McCartney / Mika / Kylie Minogue / Kate Nash / Ruby Turner / Seasick Steve
== Later's 200th Episode (shown Friday at 11:50 PM) ==
31x01	1 February 2008	Radiohead / Cat Power / Feist / Mary J. Blige / Dionne Warwick / Robyn Hitchcock
== Series 31 == (N.B. Shown Fridays at 11:35 pm on BBC Two; repeated Saturdays.)
31x02	8 February 2008	Morrissey / British Sea Power / Nate James / Mayra Andrade / Joe Brown / Ida Maria
31x03	15 February 2008	Hot Chip / Sheryl Crow / Liza Minnelli / SugaRush Beat Company / Rahsaan Patterson / Ida Corr / The Imagined Village / Jacob Golden
31x04	22 February 2008	We Are Scientists / Steve Earle / Aṣa / Martina Topley-Bird / Duffy / MGMT
31x05	29 February 2008	Supergrass / Vampire Weekend / The Big Chris Barber Band / The Kills / Dianne Reeves / Devon Sproule
== Series 32 == (N.B. Shown Tuesdays & Fridays on BBC2. Tuesday date is given as both programmes are recorded on this date; the Friday programme is recorded before the live Tuesday show.)
32x01	1 April 2008	Adele / James Taylor / Estelle / The Only Ones / Black Kids / Neil Cowley Trio / Kano
32x02	8 April 2008	Goldfrapp / Yeasayer / Glen Hansard & Marketa Irglova (AKA The Swell Season) / Natty / The Kooks / Dawn Kinnard and Ed Harcourt
32x03	15 April 2008	Portishead / Sharon Jones & The Dap-Kings / Toumani Diabaté / The Last Shadow Puppets / Phil Campbell / DeVotchKa / Marshall Chess (interview) / Eric Burdon & Lonnie Jordan (interview)
32x04	22 April 2008	The Charlatans / Was (Not Was) / Eartha Kitt / Brandi Carlile / The Pigeon Detectives / Lykke Li / Yamato – The Drummers of Japan
32x05	29 April 2008	James / Melody Gardot / The Gutter Twins / Mable John / Operator Please / Pentangle / Liam Finn
32x06	6 May 2008	Robert Plant & Alison Krauss with T-Bone Burnett / Spiritualized / Emmylou Harris with Buddy Miller / Santogold (now known as Santigold) / The Fratellis / Chris Difford
32x07	13 May 2008	Nick Cave and the Bad Seeds / The Raconteurs / Sharleen Spiteri / Bon Iver / Glasvegas / Chatham County Line / Mary Wilson / Mick Hucknall
32x08	20 May 2008	Paul Weller / Jimmy Cliff / Martha Wainwright / White Lies / Yoav / Tricky
== Series 33 == (N.B. Shown Tuesdays & Fridays on BBC2. Tuesday date is given as both programmes are recorded on this date; the Friday programme is recorded before the live Tuesday show.)
33x01	16 September 2008	Metallica / Kings of Leon / Carla Bruni / Nicole Atkins / VV Brown / Sway DaSafo
33x02	23 September 2008	Elbow / David Gilmour / Katy Perry / Roots Manuva / Imelda May / Hayes Carll
33x03	3 October 2008	Kaiser Chiefs / The Streets / Seasick Steve / TV on the Radio / Little Jackie / Boy George
33x04	10 October 2008	Coldplay / Sia / Glen Campbell / Amy LaVere / John Mellencamp / Cage the Elephant / Mick Fleetwood (interview)
33x05	17 October 2008	Tom Jones / Snow Patrol / Eliza Carthy / Friendly Fires / Camille O'Sullivan / Stephen Stills
33x06	24 October 2008	Keane / Bloc Party / Jakob Dylan / Amadou & Mariam / Allen Toussaint / CocknBullKid / Dave Clark (interview)
33x07	31 October 2008	Grace Jones / Razorlight / Seu Jorge / Geraint Watkins / Akon / Novice Theory / Dave Edmunds (interview) / David Arnold (interview)
33x08	7 November 2008	The Killers / Fleet Foxes / Al Green / Little Boots / Monkey: Journey to the West / Pendulum
33x09	14 November 2008	Stereophonics / Eli "Paperboy" Reed / Dengue Fever / Carolina Chocolate Drops / Solange / Ruby Turner & Louise Marshall / Ray Davies (interview)
== Jools' 16th Annual Hootenanny ==
	31 December 2008	Martha and the Vandellas / Dave Edmunds / Annie Lennox / Lily Allen / Dizzee Rascal / Duffy / Sväng / Adele / Sam Sparro / The Hold Steady / Rico Rodriguez / Kelly Jones / Ruby Turner
== Series 34 ==
34x01	10 April 2009	Franz Ferdinand / Karima Francis / The Mummers / Carole King / The Specials / Yeah Yeah Yeahs
34x02	17 April 2009	Joe Bonamassa / Doves / Marianne Faithfull / Grandmaster Flash / Noisettes / Madeleine Peyroux / Rokia Traoré
34x03	24 April 2009	Bat for Lashes / Hockey / Madness / Oumou Sangaré / William Elliott Whitmore / Yusuf
34x04	1 May 2009	Priscilla Ahn / Lily Allen / Depeche Mode / Raphael Saadiq / Sonic Youth / Taj Mahal
34x05	8 May 2009	Grizzly Bear / Gurrumul / Manic Street Preachers / Paolo Nutini / Taylor Swift / Booker T
34x06	15 May 2009	Jon Allen / Lisa Hannigan / Annie Lennox / Little Boots / Daniel Merriweather / New York Dolls / Asher Roth
34x07	22 May 2009	Golden Silvers / Hypnotic Brass Ensemble / Paul Jones / Kasabian / Baaba Maal / The Pretenders / Regina Spektor
== Series 35 ==
35x01	18 September 2009	Jimmy Cobb's "So What" Band / Florence + the Machine / Stewart Copeland / Muse / Alela Diane / Gossip / Lyle Lovett
35x02	25 September 2009	Dizzee Rascal / Editors / Beverley Knight / Gang of Four / Krystle Warren / ABC of Boogie Woogie / Charlie Watts
35x03	2 October 2009	Mika / Gladys Knight / The Cribs / Shakira / The xx / The Duke and the King
35x04	9 October 2009	Echo & the Bunnymen / Biffy Clyro / Calvin Harris / Andy Williams / Diana Jones / Spaghetti Western Orchestra
35x05	16 October 2009	Paloma Faith / Magazine / Seasick Steve / Wolfmother / Jimmy Ruffin / Devendra Banhart
35x06	23 October 2009	Basement Jaxx / Yoko Ono / The Dead Weather / Smokey Robinson with Eric Clapton / Bassekou Kouyate & Ngoni Ba / Miike Snow
35x07	30 October 2009	Maxwell / Stereophonics / Diana Krall / Wild Beasts / The Unthanks / Ellie Goulding
35x08	6 November 2009	Foo Fighters / Norah Jones / Sting / Stornoway / Jay Z / Erik Mongrain / Ginger Baker (interview)
35x09	13 November 2009	Alice in Chains / Black Joe Lewis & the Honeybears / Delphic / Joss Stone / Martha Wainwright / Rickie Lee Jones / Steve Martin And The Steep Canyon Rangers
35x10	20 November 2009	The Big Pink / Corinne Bailey Rae / David Gray with Annie Lennox / The Decemberists / Rox / Stan Tracey / The Low Anthem / Trevor Horn (interview) / Vic Reeves (interview)
== Jools' 17th Annual Hootenanny ==
	31 December 2009	Florence + the Machine / Paolo Nutini / Shingai Shoniwa / Dizzee Rascal / Tom Jones / Paloma Faith / Dave Edmunds / Rodrigo y Gabriela / Ruby Turner / Kasabian / Kelly Jones / Boy George / Rico Rodriguez
== Series 36 ==
36x01	16 April 2010	Paul Weller / Paul Rodgers / Marina and the Diamonds / Hot Chip / Polar Bear / Gogol Bordello / Villagers
36x02	23 April 2010	Kate Nash / Band of Horses / Jerry Dammers & The Spatial AKA Orchestra / Plan B / Melody Gardot / Jack Bruce
36x03	30 April 2010	Gorillaz with Mos Def and Bobby Womack and Little Dragon and De La Soul and Gruff Rhys / Laura Marling / Drive-By Truckers / Diane Birch / Bobby McFerrin / Mos Def
36x04	7 May 2010	Mumford & Sons / Joanna Newsom / Hole / Iggy Pop / Ozzy Osbourne / Angélique Kidjo / Lissie / Ian Hunter
36x05	14 May 2010	LCD Soundsystem / Crowded House / Kelis / The National / Tracey Thorn / Pete Molinari / Aaron Johnson (interview) / Sam Taylor-Wood (interview)
36x06	21 May 2010	Alicia Keys / Yeasayer / Macy Gray / White Rabbits / Jeff Beck / Creole Choir of Cuba
36x07	28 May 2010	Vampire Weekend / Corinne Bailey Rae / MGMT / Crystal Castles / Tom Jones / Metric
== Later's 250th Episode (shown Friday at 11:50PM) ==
37x01	17 September 2010	Queen Emily / Klaxons / Herb Alpert / Phil Collins / Mark Ronson / Manic Street Preachers
== Series 37 ==
37x02	24 September 2010	Scissor Sisters / Brandon Flowers / Grinderman / Rumer / John Grant / The Jolly Boys / Sandie Shaw
37x03	1 October 2010	Jamiroquai / KT Tunstall / Delta Spirit / Everything Everything / Ray LaMontagne / Mama Rosin / Ray LaMontagne & the Pariah Dogs / Harry Enfield (interview)
37x04	8 October 2010	CeeLo Green / Steve Miller Band / Janelle Monáe / The Jim Jones Revue / C. W. Stoneking / Cheikh Lô / Duane Eddy, Richard Hawley & Jarvis Cocker (interview)
37x05	15 October 2010	The Ting Tings / Cyndi Lauper / John Legend / Imelda May / Antony and the Johnsons / Ray Davies & Mumford & Sons / Chapel Club
37x06	22 October 2010	Duffy / The Gaslight Anthem / Heaven 17 / Crystal Fighters / The Pierces/ Marques Toliver / Sheryl Crow / Peter Asher (interview)
37x07	29 October 2010	Sir Paul McCartney / Elvis Costello / Aloe Blacc / Neil Diamond / The Black Keys / Alice Cooper (interview)
37x08	5 November 2010	Kings of Leon / Eric Clapton / The Vaccines / M.I.A / Bellowhead / Jonathan Jeremiah
37x09	12 November 2010	Bryan Ferry / Tinie Tempah with Eric Turner / Midlake / Two Door Cinema Club / Louise Marshall / Ruby Turner / Jessie J / Slash (interview) / Harry Hill (interview)
37x10	19 November 2010	Robert Plant / Arcade Fire / Mavis Staples / Raghu Dixit / Mona / Adele
== Jools' 18th Annual Hootenanny ==
	31 December 2010	Kylie Minogue / Toots Hibbert / Wanda Jackson / CeeLo Green / Rumer / Roger Daltrey / Ruby Turner & Rico Rodriguez / Vampire Weekend / Bellowhead / Plan B / The Secret Sisters
== Series 38 ==
38x01	8 April 2011	Elbow / Beady Eye / Anna Calvi / Raphael Saadiq / The Tallest Man on Earth / McCoy Tyner
38x02	15 April 2011	Bootsy Collins / CeeLo Green / Glasvegas / Josh T. Pearson / Gregory Porter / Robbie Robertson / Seun Kuti & Egypt 80
38x03	22 April 2011	k.d. lang / Fleet Foxes / Hugh Laurie / Vintage Trouble / Maverick Sabre / The Agitator
38x04	29 April 2011	PJ Harvey / Lykke Li / The Unthanks / Avery Sunshine / Ed Sheeran / Ron Sexsmith
38x05	6 May 2011	Adele / R. Kelly / Metronomy / James Blake / Young the Giant / Mariza / Brett Anderson (interview)
38x06	13 May 2011	Arctic Monkeys / Alison Krauss & Union Station / Gappy Ranks / Warpaint / Brian Wilson / Randy Newman
38x07	20 May 2011	The Strokes / Staff Benda Bilili / Wild Beasts / Seasick Steve / The Burns Unit (including Soom T) / Charlie Haden Quartet West
38x08	27 May 2011	Friendly Fires / Yuck / Blondie / Nathaniel Rateliff / Beverley Knight / James Vincent McMorrow / Donovan
== Series 39 ==
39x01	23 September 2011	Snow Patrol / Emeli Sandé / Little Dragon / The Duke Spirit / Trombone Shorty / Roy Harper
39x02	30 September 2011	Kasabian / Wretch 32 / Pajama Club / Fatoumata Diawara / James Morrison / Wilko Johnson
39x03	7 October 2011	Laura Marling / Tony Bennett / The Silver Seas / Little Roy / The Civil Wars / Miles Kane
39x04	14 October 2011	Peter Gabriel / The Horrors / Ghostpoet / Lana Del Rey / Noah and the Whale / Steve Tilston
39x05	21 October 2011	Feist / Bon Iver / Mastodon / Ben l'Oncle Soul / Buddy Greco / Lianne La Havas
39x06	28 October 2011	Coldplay / Camille / Professor Green / Ryan Adams / The Waterboys / The Phoenix Foundation / Nicky Wire
39x07	4 November 2011	Florence + the Machine / Pete Townshend / My Morning Jacket / Mary J. Blige / Brett Anderson / Bombino / Cold Specks
39x08	11 November 2011	Lou Reed and Metallica / Steve Earle / Various Cruelties / Nile Rodgers / Aaron Neville / Keb' Mo' / Hollie Cook / The Soul Rebels Brass Band
39x09	18 November 2011	Series Highlights: PJ Harvey / Janelle Monáe / The Civil Wars / Lana Del Rey / Metronomy / Gregory Porter / The Vaccines / Emeli Sandé / Aloe Blacc / Lianne La Havas / Anna Calvi / Josh T. Pearson / Jessie J / Miles Kane / Ed Sheeran / Florence and the Machine / Adele
39x10	25 November 2011	Red Hot Chili Peppers / Björk / Noel Gallagher's High Flying Birds / Spector / Michael Kiwanuka / Gillian Welch
== Jools' 19th Annual Hootenanny ==
	31 December 2011	Pokey LaFarge and the South City Three / Cyndi Lauper / Sandie Shaw / Betty Wright / Ruby Turner / Jessie J / Caro Emerald / Aloe Blacc / Imelda May / The Vaccines / Charlie Musselwhite / Gregory Porter James Morrison
== Series 40 ==
40x01	20 April 2012	Paul Weller / The Maccabees / Beth Jeans Houghton & The Hooves Of Destiny / Céu / Paul Buchanan / Willis Earl Beal
40x02	27 April 2012	Jack White / Norah Jones / Alabama Shakes / The Chieftains / Grimes / Carolina Chocolate Drops / The Secret Sisters
40x03	4 May 2012	Richard Hawley / St. Vincent / Damon Albarn / Herbert von Karajan / Rita Ora / Charles Bradley / Tigran Hamasyan
40x04	11 May 2012	Plan B / Django Django / Tom Jones / Ren Harvieu / Melody Gardot / Punch Brothers
40x05	18 May 2012	Hot Chip / Josh Osho / Ben Howard / Dexys / Rumer & Jimmy Webb / June Tabor & Oysterband
40x06	25 May 2012	Jimmy Cliff / Beach House / The Hives / Paloma Faith / Esperanza Spalding / Jake Bugg
== Series 41 ==
41x01	28 September 2012	Muse / The Beach Boys / Public Image Ltd. / The xx / Natalie Duncan
41x02	5 October 2012	Mumford & Sons / Bobby Womack with Damon Albarn / Lisa Marie Presley / Neil Sedaka / Savages / Rudimental / Jeff Lynne (interview)
41x03	12 October 2012	The Vaccines / John Cale / Sharon Van Etten / Jessie Ware / Beth Hart / Herbert Grönemeyer / Francis Rossi (interview)
41x04	19 October 2012	Madness / Grizzly Bear / Willy Moon / Diana Krall / Mokoomba / Sam Carter
41x05	26 October 2012	Alice Cooper / Bloc Party / Alt-J (∆) / Dionne Warwick / Charley Pride / Josephine Oniyama
41x06	2 November 2012	The Killers / Poliça / Cody ChesnuTT / Kristina Train / Adam Ant (interview) / Valerie June / Jackie DeShannon
41x07	9 November 2012	Soundgarden / Two Door Cinema Club / Trey Songz / Bat for Lashes / Bhi Bhiman / The Staves
41x08	16 November 2012	Jimmy Page (interview) / Foals / Ellie Goulding / Band of Horses / Larry Graham & Graham Central Station / Rodriguez / Luisa Sobral
41x09	23 November 2012	Sinéad O'Connor / Tame Impala / Biffy Clyro / Lau / Courtney Pine / Larry 'Mud' Morganfield / Bryan Ferry (interview) / Bill Fay (interview) / Danny Baker (interview)
41x10	30 November 2012	Lana Del Rey / The Weeknd / Soul II Soul / Palma Violets / Nona Hendryx / Tom Odell / Tift Merritt
== Jools' 20th Annual Hootenanny ==
	31 December 2012	Ruby Turner / The Hives / Bettye LaVette / Adam Ant / Lianne La Havas / Bobby Womack / The Dubliners / Petula Clark / Emeli Sandé / Roland Gift / Paloma Faith / Dexys Midnight Runners / Professor Green / Jake Bugg
== Series 42 == First series produced at The Maidstone Studios
42x01	12 April 2013	Suede / Laura Mvula / Charles Bradley / Cat Power / The Strypes / John Fullbright
42x02	19 April 2013	Primal Scream / Jamie Cullum / Haim / Everything Everything / Ana Moura / Night Beds
42x03	26 April 2013	Phoenix / Rokia Traoré / Eric Church / Laura Marling / Petula Clark / AlunaGeorge
42x04	3 May 2013	Vampire Weekend / Yeah Yeah Yeahs / Dido / Seasick Steve / Jacob Banks / Eric Burdon / Ludovico Einaudi
42x05	17 May 2013	Queens of the Stone Age / Texas / Peace / Lulu James / Patty Griffin with Robert Plant / Kat Men / Ian Paice and Ian Gillan (interview)
42x06	24 May 2013	John Grant / Stereophonics / Low / The Lee Thompson Ska Orchestra / Bitty McLean / Melt Yourself Down / Yasmine Hamdan
42x07	31 May 2013	Beady Eye / KT Tunstall / Deap Vally / OMD / Miguel / George the Poet
42x08	7 June 2013	Caro Emerald / Johnny Marr / Disclosure / Noah and the Whale / Bonnie Raitt / Gabriel Bruce
== Series 43 ==
43x01	20 September 2013	Kanye West / Kings of Leon / Sting / Lorde / Drenge (Studio Guest; Bill Medley)
43x02	27 September 2013	Janelle Monáe / Pixies / CHVRCHES / Tony Joe White / Barrence Whitfield & The Savages / Hugh Laurie
43x03	4 October 2013	Franz Ferdinand / Goldfrapp / James Blake / Gregory Porter / Chas & Dave / Radkey
43x04	11 October 2013	Manic Street Preachers / Jake Bugg / Poliça / Kacey Musgraves / VV Brown / Cécile McLorin Salvant
43x05	18 October 2013	MGMT / John Newman / Anna Calvi / Lloyd Cole / Passenger / Concha Buika
43x06	25 October 2013	Arctic Monkeys / Sir Paul McCartney / Katy B / Gary Clark Jr. / Benjamin Clementine
43x07	1 November 2013	The National / John Mayer / London Grammar / Lissie / Graham Parker & The Rumour
43x08	8 November 2013	The Killers / Chase & Status / Boy George / The Orwells / Denai Moore
== Jools' 21st Annual Hootenanny ==
	31 December 2013	Lisa Stansfield / Haim / Charlie Wilson / Rudimental / John Newman / Ruby Turner / Ray Davies / Ella Eyre / Melanie C / Laura Mvula / The Lumineers / The Proclaimers / Dawn Penn / Lee Thompson / Emeli Sandé
== Series 44 ==
44x01	18 April 2014	Elbow / Neneh Cherry / Eagulls / Clean Bandit / Engelbert Humperdinck / Agnes Obel
44x02	25 April 2014	Paolo Nutini / Royal Blood / Neil Finn / Joan As Police Woman / Lucius / Zara McFarlane
44x03	30 April 2014	Damon Albarn / Coldplay / The Black Keys / Sharon Jones & The Dap-Kings / Aziza Brahim / Tom Hickox
44x04	6 May 2014	The Horrors / Aloe Blacc / Little Dragon / The Afghan Whigs / Roger Cicero / Sturgill Simpson
44x05	13 May 2014	Brian Eno & Karl Hyde / Kasabian / George Ezra / St. Vincent / Ibibio Sound Machine / Natalie Merchant
44x06	20 May 2014	Ed Sheeran / Kelis / Hurray for the Riff Raff / Chrissie Hynde / White Denim / Nick Mulvey
44x07	27 May 2014	Imelda May / Hank Marvin / Sharon Van Etten / Arcade Fire / Kwabs / Damien Jurado / Wild Beasts
== Series 45 ==
45x01	16 September 2014	alt-J / Ryan Adams / Jungle / FKA twigs / The O'Jays / Vance Joy
45x02	23 September 2014	Mary J. Blige / Marianne Faithfull / Band of Skulls / Hozier / First Aid Kit / GoGo Penguin
45x03	30 September 2014	Jamie T / Ali Campbell / Gorgon City / Damien Rice / Future Islands / Chastity Brown / Beverley Knight
45x04	7 October 2014	Manic Street Preachers / Robert Randolph and the Family Band / Jessie Ware / Ben Howard / Mélanie De Biasio / Benjamin Booker
45x05	16 October 2014	Sinéad O'Connor / Rumer / Labrinth / Rival Sons / Holly Johnson / Adam Cohen / Ibeyi
45x06	21 October 2014	U2 / Sam Smith / Interpol / Zola Jesus / Slaves / Dave Alvin and Phil Alvin
45x07	28 October 2014	Robert Plant / Counting Crows / tUnE-yArDs / Gedeon Luke & The People / Years & Years / Stormzy
45x08	4 November 2014	Bryan Ferry / Paul Rodgers / The War On Drugs / Fuse ODG / Seinabo Sey / Laura Doggett / David Gilmour (interview)
== Jools' 22nd Annual Hootenanny ==
	31 December 2014	Jools Holland's Rhythm and Blues Orchestra / Ronnie Spector / Ed Sheeran / Boz Scaggs / Paolo Nutini / Ellie Goulding / William Bell / Paloma Faith / Wilko Johnson / Clean Bandit / Jess Glynne / Joss Stone / Ruby Turner / Hayseed Dixie / The Pipes and Drums, 1st Battalion Scots Guards / Future Islands
== Series 46 ==
46x01	14 April 2015	Blur / The Vaccines / Natalie Prass / Laura Marling / Davina and the Vagabonds / Songhoy Blues / Marc Almond Setlist Live Show: 1. Blur – I Broadcast; 2. The Vaccines – Handsome; 3. Natalie Prass – Birds Of Prey; 4. Marc Almond talk @ table 5. Davina and the Vagabonds – Sunshine; 6. Songhoy Blues – Soubour; 7. Laura Marling – Strange; 8. The Vaccines – 20/20; 9. Blur – Ong Ong; Setlist Taped Show: 1. Blur – Ong Ong; 2. The Vaccines – Handsome; 3. Natalie Prass – Birds Of Prey; 4. Songhoy Blues – Nick; 5. Marc Almond talk @ piano 6. Laura Marling – Easy; 7. The Vaccines – Dream Lover; 8. Blur – My Terracotta Heart; 9. Marc Almond – Scar; 10. Songhoy Blues – Soubour; 11. Blur talk 12. Davina and the Vagabonds – Red Shoes; 13. Natalie Prass – Why Don't You Believe Me?; 14. The Vaccines – 20/20; 15. Blur – Go Out
46x02	21 April 2015	Parliament-Funkadelic / Mumford & Sons / Noel Gallagher's High Flying Birds / Mirel Wagner / Cheikh Lô / Ghostpoet Setlist Live Show: 1. Mumford & Sons – The Wolf; 2. Parliament-Funkadelic – Give Up The Funk; 3. Ghostpoet – X Marks the Spot; 4. Noel Gallagher talk @ table 5. Mirel Wagner – Oak Tree; 6. Noel Gallagher's High Flying Birds – You Know We Can't Go Back; 7. Cheikh Lô – Degg Gui; 8. Mumford & Sons – Believe; Setlist Taped Show: 1. Mumford & Sons – The Wolf; 2. Parliament-Funkadelic – Give Up The Funk; 3. Noel Gallagher's High Flying Birds – Lock All The Doors; 4. Ghostpoet – X Marks The Spot; 5. George Clinton talk @ table 6. Cheikh Lô – Degg Gui; 7. Mumford & Sons – Believe; 8. Noel Gallagher's High Flying Birds – The Dying Of The Light; 9. Mirel Wagner – Oak Tree; 10. Noel Gallagher talk @ table 11. Ghostpoet – Off Peak Dreams
46x03	28 April 2015	Florence and the Machine / The Charlatans / James Taylor / Mini Mansions / Andreya Triana / Madisen Ward and the Mama Bear Setlist Live Show: 1. Florence and the Machine – Ship To Wreck; 2. The Charlatans – Let The Good Times Be Never Ending; 3. Andreya Triana – Gold; 4. Florence Welch talk 5. Madisen Ward and the Mama Bear – Silent Movies; 6. Mini Mansions – Death Is A Girl; 7. James Taylor – Montana; 8. Florence and the Machine – What Kind Of Man; Setlist Taped Show: 1. Florence and the Machine – Ship To Wreck; 2. Mini Mansions – Freakout!; 3. Andreya Triana – Gold; 4. James Taylor – talk @ piano 5. The Charlatans – Let The Good Times Be Never Ending; 6. James Taylor – Montana; 7. Florence and the Machine – St. Jude; 8. Madisen Ward and the Mama Bear – Silent Movies; 9. Florence Welch talk 10. Andreya Triana – The Changing Shapes Of Love; 11. Mini Mansions – Death Is A Girl; 12. James Taylor – Stretch Of The Highway; 13. The Charlatans – Come Home Baby; 14. Florence and the Machine – How Big, How Blue, How Beautiful
46x04	5 May 2015	FFS / Alabama Shakes / The Lone Bellow / Tobias Jesso Jr. / The Unthanks / Shaun Escoffery / Status Quo (interview)
46x05	12 May 2015	Paul Weller / Father John Misty / Lianne La Havas / Curtis Harding / The Hot Sardines / SOAK
46x06	19 May 2015	Rudimental / Joan Armatrading / Leon Bridges / Ezra Furman / Simply Red / Skepta / Huey Morgan (interview) / Paul Burgess (interview)
46x07	26 May 2015	Muse / Melody Gardot / Sleater-Kinney / Giorgio Moroder / Seasick Steve / Peggy Seeger / Ala.Ni
== Series 47 ==
47x01	16 September 2015	Squeeze / Foals / Disclosure (with Sam Smith and Kwabs) / Rickie Lee Jones / My Morning Jacket
47x02	22 September 2015	The Maccabees / Richard Thompson / Róisín Murphy / Stereophonics / Izzy Bizu / Liam Bailey
47x03	29 September 2015	The Weeknd / David Gilmour / The Libertines / DakhaBrakha / Nathaniel Rateliff and The Night Sweats
47x04	6 October 2015	Richard Hawley / Tom Jones / John Grant / Alessia Cara / Tiggs da Author
47x05	13 October 2015	John Newman / Sleaford Mods / Everything Everything / Labi Siffre / Lizz Wright / Lynched / Burt Bacharach (interview) / Kyle Riabko (interview) / Charlie Wilson
47x06	20 October 2015	Duran Duran / Public Image Ltd. / Miguel / Frazey Ford / Wolf Alice / Little Simz
47x07	27 October 2015	Guy Garvey / Dave Gahan & Soulsavers / Jamie Woon / Caravan Palace / Judy Collins / Béla Fleck & Abigail Washburn / Willy Mason
47x08	3 November 2015	CeeLo Green / The Zombies / Joanna Newsom / Low / The Arcs / Mbongwana Star / Shura
== Jools' 23rd Annual Hootenanny ==
	31 December 2015	Jools Holland's Rhythm and Blues Orchestra / Sir Tom Jones / Jess Glynne / Paul Weller / Hozier / James Bay / Future Islands / Jeff Beck / Beth Hart / KT Tunstall / Rhiannon Giddens / Pauline Black & Arthur 'Gaps' Hendrickson / Ruby Turner / The Pipes and Drums, 1st Battalion Scots Guards
== Series 48 ==
48x01	19 April 2016	Laura Mvula / The Coral / Jason Isbell / Lake Street Dive / Paul Simon / MC Kano
48x02	26 April 2016	Gregory Porter / Field Music / Son Little / Mumford & Sons with Baaba Maal, The Very Best & Beatenberg / Christine & The Queens / Sam Lee
48x03	3 May 2016	Underworld / The Lumineers / Savages / Marlon Williams / Beverley Knight / Rationale
48x04	10 May 2016	Elton John / Bloc Party / Spring King / Corinne Bailey Rae / Basia Bulat / Kronos Quartet
48x05	17 May 2016	Iggy Pop / Margo Price / Graham Nash / Blossoms / Protoje / Lou Doillon
48x06	24 May 2016	The Last Shadow Puppets / Bonnie Raitt / Ballake Sissoko / Vincent Segal / NAO / Dinosaur Jr / Zucchero
48x07	31 May 2016	Tame Impala / Biffy Clyro / Michael Kiwanuka / Moon Hooch / James Blake / Lera Lynn
== Series 49 ==
49x01	13 September 2016	Kings of Leon / Jack White / Sting / Banks / M83 / Kandace Springs / Jimmy Page (interview only)
49x02	20 September 2016	Madness / Jamie T / Beth Orton / Gallant / Rag'n'Bone Man / The Divine Comedy
49x03	27 September 2016	Barry Gibb / Norah Jones / Slaves / Declan McKenna / Lisa Hannigan
49x04	4 October 2016	Twin Atlantic / James Vincent McMorrow / Blackberry Smoke / Madeleine Peyroux / Tom Chaplin / Tony Momrelle
49x05	11 October 2016	The Pretenders / Samm Henshaw / Ray BLK / Empire of the Sun / Bad Company (interview only) / Loudon Wainwright III / Joanne Shaw Taylor
49x06	18 October 2016	KT Tunstall / St. Paul and The Broken Bones / Teleman / Haley Bonar / The Temptations / Duke Fakir (The Four Tops) (interview & archive clip only) / Let's Eat Grandma
49x07	25 October 2016	Emeli Sandé / Wilco / Warpaint / Regina Spektor / MØ / Anoushka Shankar
49x08	1 November 2016	Chase & Status / Glass Animals / Sleigh Bells / Nick Waterhouse / Joseph / Jose Feliciano / Mick 'Woody' Woodmansey (interview)
== Jools' 24th Annual Hootenanny ==
	31 December 2016	Jools Holland's Rhythm and Blues Orchestra / Chaka Khan / Christine and the Queens / Roy Wood / Rag'n'Bone Man / Gregory Porter / Martin Fry's ABC / UB40 featuring Ali Campbell, Astro and Mickey Virtue / Seasick Steve / Caravan Palace / Imelda May / John Cooper Clarke and Hugh Cornwell / Ruby Turner / The Pipes and Drums, 1st Battalion Scots Guards
== Series 50 ==
50x01	11 April 2017	Kasabian / Anderson .Paak & The Free Nationals / Goldfrapp / Thundercat / Spoon / Courtney Marie Andrews
50x02	18 April 2017	Ed Sheeran / Michael Chapman / Valerie June / Syd / Daymé Arocena
50x03	25 April 2017	The Amazons / Robert Cray & Hi Rhythm / Jain / LP / Beth Ditto / Eivør
50x04	2 May 2017	Blondie / Future Islands / Mabel / Orchestra Baobab / London Grammar / Binker and Moses
50x05	9 May 2017	10cc / Sigrid / Benjamin Booker / Joan Shelley / Japandroids / Ibibio Sound Machine
50x06	16 May 2017	Paul Weller / alt-J / Dave / Little Dragon / Maggie Rogers / Naturally 7
50x07	23 May 2017	Sheryl Crow / Lorde / Oumou Sangaré / Pumarosa / Aldous Harding / Jane Birkin / Stefflon Don
50x08	30 May 2017	Royal Blood / The xx / Trombone Shorty / Haim / Chronixx / Maren Morris
== The A-Z of Later...with Jools Holland: From Adele to ZZ Top ==
	16 September 2017	A 90-minute edition celebrating the diverse acts that have appeared on the programme during the quarter of a century it has been on air. Kicking off with a look back at the times Adele and Amy Winehouse made their TV debuts on the show, moving through boogie woogie and onto debuts, grime, jazz, the oldest artists who have been on, PJ Harvey and pop, reggae, the unplanned and unpredictable, the youngest and of course ZZ Top. Contributors include the likes of Ed Sheeran, Norah Jones, Dizzee Rascal, Gregory Porter, Slaves, Kings of Leon, Sting, Chrissie Hynde, Josh Homme, Rag'n'Bone Man and many more.
== Later 25 at London's Royal Albert Hall ==
	23 September 2017 (Note: Held on 21 September at London's Royal Albert Hall, and aired on BBC Two at 9.00pm on 23 September (repeated on BBC Two at 11:15pm on 29 September).)	Foo Fighters / Paul Weller / Van Morrison / Dizzee Rascal / Jorja Smith / Gregory Porter / Kali Uchis / Camille / Songhoy Blues / KT Tunstall
== Series 51 == (N.B. Shown Tuesdays & Saturdays on BBC2. Tuesday date is given as both programmes are recorded on this date; the Saturday programme is recorded before the live Tuesday show.)
51x01	26 September 2017	Liam Gallagher / Benjamin Clementine / Elise LeGrow / Jorja Smith / LCD Soundsystem / Nadia Reid / Jimmy Webb (interview)
51x02	3 October 2017	The National / Morrissey / Queens of the Stone Age (Josh Homme with Dean Fertita and a string quartet) / Khalid / Jessie Ware / Marty Stuart
51x03	10 October 2017	Robert Plant / St Vincent / Nick Mulvey / Kelela / John Moreland / Beck
51x04	17 October 2017	Wolf Alice / Grizzly Bear / SZA / R.L. Boyce / Paul Heaton & Jacqui Abbott / King Krule
51x05	24 October 2017	Stereophonics / Hurray for the Riff Raff / Moses Sumney / Richard Thompson / Hiromi / The White Buffalo / Zara McFarlane
51x06	31 October 2017	Noel Gallagher's High Flying Birds / Dua Lipa / Saz'iso / Superorganism / Aimee Mann / Jools Holland & José Feliciano w/ Rita Wilson / Amadou & Mariam
== Jools' 25th Annual Hootenanny ==
	31 December 2017	Jools Holland's Rhythm and Blues Orchestra / Ed Sheeran / Mavis Staples / Trombone Shorty and Orleans Avenue / Jessie Ware / Soul II Soul / Beth Ditto / The Beat starring Dave Wakeling / George McCrae / José Feliciano / Ruby Turner / The Pipes and Drums, 1st Battalion Scots Guards
== Series 52 == (N.B. Shown Tuesdays & Saturdays (episodes 3 to 6) or Sundays (episodes 1 & 2) on BBC2. Tuesday date is given as both programmes are recorded on this date; the Saturday/Sunday programme is recorded before the live Tuesday show.)
52x01	8 May 2018	Snow Patrol / Shame / Bettye LaVette / Plan B / Tower of Power / Jade Bird
52x02	15 May 2018	Manic Street Preachers / Boy Azooga / Gwenno / Melissa Laveaux / Ray LaMontagne / Ben Howard
52x03	22 May 2018	Björk / The Breeders / Les Amazones d'Afrique / Deva Mahal / Hailey Tuck / LUMP (Laura Marling & Mike Lindsay of the band Tunng)
52x04	29 May 2018	Florence + The Machine / Femi Kuti / Lily Allen / Lady Leshurr / Young Fathers / Starcrawler
52x05	5 June 2018	Christine & The Queens / Kamasi Washington / James / St. Vincent / Daniel Caesar / Daniel Blumberg
52x06	12 June 2018	Nile Rodgers and Chic / Nathaniel Rateliff & The Night Sweats / Nakhane / Gaz Coombes / Goat Girl / Chas & Dave
== Series 53 == (N.B. Shown Tuesdays & Saturdays on BBC2. Tuesday date is given as both programmes are recorded on this date; the Saturday programme is recorded before the live Tuesday show.)
53x01	25 September 2018	Jess Glynne / IDLES / Soft Cell / Hak Baker / King Princess / Ralph McTell
53x02	2 October 2018	Muse / Laurel / Jon Cleary / John Grant / Easy Life / Hamzaa
53x03	9 October 2018	Neneh Cherry / The Lemon Twigs / Echo & the Bunnymen / Sam Fender / Frederick Nathaniel 'Toots' Hibbert / Ashley McBryde
53x04	16 October 2018	Sigrid / Paul Weller / Jacob Banks / Villagers / Joe Bonamassa / Octavian / Rosalía
53x05	23 October 2018	Interpol / Bugzy Malone feat. Rag'n'Bone Man / Fantastic Negrito / Another Sky / Fatoumata Diawara / Marc Almond / Olivia Chaney
53x06	30 October 2018	Jungle / The Good, the Bad & the Queen / Robyn / Mattiel / Terry Reid / Ghetts
== Jools' 26th Annual Hootenanny ==
	31 December 2018	Jools Holland's Rhythm and Blues Orchestra / Marc Almond / Michael Bublé / George Ezra / Hot 8 Brass Band / Junior Giscombe / Jess Glynne / Nile Rodgers & Chic / The Record Company / Rudimental / Yola / Ruby Turner / The Pipes and Drums, 1st Battalion Scots Guards
== Series 54 == (N.B. Shown Thursdays (30min) & Fridays (Even Later, 60min) on BBC2. Thursday date is given as that is the date of the first transmission; both are pre-recorded programmes.)
54x01	17 October 2019	Mark Ronson (co-host) / Yebba / Sampa the Great / Cate Le Bon / Georgia / PP Arnold
54x02	24 October 2019	Jessie Ware (co-host) / Liam Gallagher / Rex Orange County / Amyl and the Sniffers / Kojey Radical / Celeste
54x03	31 October 2019	Lady Leshurr (co-host) / The S.L.P. / Elbow / Little Simz / Michael Kiwanuka / slowthai / James Acaster
54x04	7 November 2019	Jamie Cullum (co-host) / Kano / Metronomy / Joy Crookes and Jafaris / Nérija
54x05	14 November 2019	Ronnie Wood (co-host) / Imelda May (co-host) / Lewis Capaldi / Foals / Nilüfer Yanya / Sudan Archives
54x06	21 November 2019	Sir Tom Jones (co-host) / Harry Styles / Noel Gallagher's High Flying Birds / Brittany Howard / FKA twigs / Abdullah Ibrahim
== Jools' 27th Annual Hootenanny ==
	31 December 2019	Jools Holland's Rhythm and Blues Orchestra / Stormzy / Brittany Howard / Rick Astley / Tom Walker / YolanDa Brown / Stereophonics / Melanie / La Roux / Eddi Reader / Pauline Black and Arthur 'Gaps' Hendrickson (from The Selecter) / Joseph / Ruby Turner / The Pipes and Drums, 1st Battalion Scots Guards
== Series 55 == Due to COVID restrictions, Jools Holland hosted the show from his studio Helicon Mountain in south London chatting with artists via video link, showcasing new performances and introducing recordings from the Later... with Jools Holland archives.
55x01	15 May 2020	Christine and the Queens / Laura Marling
55x02	22 May 2020	Dizzee Rascal
55x03	29 May 2020	Hugh Laurie / Jacob Collier
55x04	5 June 2020	Ellie Goulding / Biig Piig
55x05	12 June 2020	Gregory Porter / Fontaines D.C.
55x06	19 June 2020	Guy Garvey
== Series 56 == Due to continuing COVID restrictions, Series 56 up to Series 60 in 2022, Jools continued to host the show at Helicon Mountain studio, though guests were gradually accommodated in person. The shows continued to be a mix of new performances and archive recordings.
56x01	25 September 2020	Michael Kiwanuka
56x02	2 October 2020	Robert Plant / Declan McKenna / London Grammar
56x03	9 October 2020	Sam Smith / Koffee / Shirley Collins
56x04	16 October 2020	Paloma Faith / Fraser T Smith / Afel Bocoum
56x05	23 October 2020	Celeste / The Lathums / Joesef
56x06	30 October 2020	Jarvis Cocker / Greentea Peng / Working Men's Club
56x07	6 November 2020	Melanie C / David Balfe / Mica Paris
== Series 57 ==
57x01	19 February 2021	Arlo Parks / Kings of Leon / Sleaford Mods
57x02	26 February 2021	Moses Boyd / Rag'n'Bone Man / Peggy Seeger
57x03	5 March 2021	Sir Tom Jones / Wolf Alice / Pa Salieu / Mahalia
57x04	12 March 2021	Laura Mvula / Dry Cleaning / Paul Weller
57x05	19 March 2021	Lenny Henry / Enny / Nubiyan Twist / K.O.G.
57x06	26 March 2021	Olly Alexander / Griff / Nitin Sawhney / Ayanna Witter-Johnson
== Series 58 ==
58x01	14 May 2021	Noel Gallagher / Jorja Smith / The Black Keys: Archive performances from: Young Fathers / The Strokes / Paul McCartney
58x02	21 May 2021	St Vincent / Johnny Flynn / Squid / Laura Mvula: Archive performances from: Lou Reed / Al Green / PJ Harvey
58x03	28 May 2021	Imelda May / Little Simz / Pa Salieu / Holly Humberstone / Sigrid: Archive performances from: Kirsty MacColl / Joan Armatrading / Queens of the Stone Age
58x04	4 June 2021	Joan Armatrading / Field Music / Gabriels: Archive performances from: Tinie Tempah / The Ting Tings / Skepta
58x05	11 June 2021	Romesh Ranganathan / Emma-Jean Thackray / Van Morrison: Archive performances from: Dizzee Rascal / Lianne La Havas / Chuck D.
58x06	18 June 2021	Kano / Self Esteem / Joel Culpepper
== Series 59 ==
59x01	2 October 2021	Damon Albarn / Emeli Sandé / Lonelady: Archive performances from: The Fugees, Willie Nelson and Regina Spektor
59x02	9 October 2021	Dave Grohl / Lady Blackbird / Jungle: Archive performances from: k.d. lang, Mariza, My Morning Jacket and Radiohead
59x03	16 October 2021	Sir Elton John / Sam Fender / Sipho: Archive performances from: Christine and the Queens, Glen Campbell and Brandi Carlile
59x04	23 October 2021	Ed Sheeran / Pip Millett / Glass Animals / Biffy Clyro: Archive performances from: KT Tunstall, Skepta and Seasick Steve
59x05	30 October 2021	Sting / Nubya Garcia / Wet Leg / Lola Young: Archive performances from:
59x06	6 November 2021	Kylie Minogue / Yard Act / Priya Ragu / Ed Sheeran: Archive performances from: Jessie Ware
== Series 60 == Filmed at the Alexandra Palace theatre
60x01	14 May 2022	Wet Leg / Joe Bonamassa / Obongjayar / Cat Burns: Archive performances from: Amy Winehouse and Peter Gabriel
60x02	21 May 2022	Liam Gallagher / Sinead O'Brien / Charlotte Adigéry and Bolis Pupul / Oumou Sangaré: Archive performances from: Oasis and Jimmy Cliff
60x03	28 May 2022	Jessie Buckley and Bernard Butler / Poppy Ajudha / Confidence Man / Warmduscher: Archive performances from: Leonard Cohen and Paul Buchanan
60x04	4 June 2022	Kojey Radical / Kasabian / Knucks / Judi Jackson / Kae Tempest: Archive performances from: Joy Crookes and Johnny Cash
60x05	11 June 2022	Paolo Nutini / Katy J Pearson / William Orbit / Polly Scattergood / Ibeyi / Foals: Archive performances from: Amadou & Mariam and Scissor Sisters
60x06	18 June 2022	Florence + The Machine / Jamie T / Deyaz / The Mysterines / kamal.: Archive performances from: Nick Cave, Paul McCartney
== Series 61 == Filmed at the Alexandra Palace theatre
61x01	1 October 2022	The 1975 / Self Esteem / Ural Thomas and the Pain / The Comet Is Coming / Victoria Canal: Archive performance from: Richard Hawley
61x02	8 October 2022	Burna Boy / Marcus Mumford / Loyle Carner / The Big Moon / PVA: Archive performances from:
61x03	15 October 2022	Raye / Phoenix / Paul Heaton and Jacqui Abbott / Dermot Kennedy / Angeline Morrison: Archive performances from:
61x04	22 October 2022	Suede / Hot Chip / Billy Nomates / Abel Selaocoe / Debbie Ehirim: Archive performances from:
61x05	29 October 2022	Simple Minds / Wu-Lu and Lex Amor / FLO / Christine and the Queens Presents Redcar / Rita Wilson and Jackson Browne: Archive performances from: Glen Campbell
61x06	5 November 2022	Arctic Monkeys: Archive performances from: The Desert Sessions
== Series 62 == Filmed at the Alexandra Palace theatre
62x01	20 May 2023	Hozier / Arlo Parks / Lisa O'Neill / Thee Sacred Souls / venbee / Interview with Jill Furmanovsky
62x02	27 May 2023	Jessie Ware / Sleaford Mods / Dave Okumu & the 7 Generations and ESKA / Olivia Dean / The Waeve. Interview with Stewart Copeland
62x03	3 June 2023	Gaz Coombes / Mahalia / Rodrigo y Gabriela / Royal Blood / Kara Jackson
62x04	10 June 2023	Alison Goldfrapp / The Lathums / Eddie Chacon / John Carroll Kirby / Baba Ali and The Jordan
62x05	17 June 2023	Gabriels / Fatoumata Diawara and Damon Albarn / Far from Saints / Grian Chatten / Elmiene / Sharleen Spiteri
62x06	24 June 2023	Noel Gallagher's High Flying Birds
== Series 63 ==
63x01	14 October 2023	Jorja Smith / The National / Say She She / Antony Szmierek / Wreckless Eric
63x02	21 October 2023	Take That / The Last Dinner Party / METTE / Frankie Archer / Skindred. Interview with Johnny Marr
63x03	28 October 2023	The Streets / Romy / Cat Power / Allison Russell / BC Camplight
63x04	4 November 2023	Sampha / Orchestral Manoeuvres in the Dark / Izo Fitzroy / Christone 'Kingfish' Ingram / Willie J Healey
63x05	11 November 2023	Róisín Murphy / Nitin Sawhney / Tom Walker / Yussef Dayes / English Teacher / Suggs
63x06	18 November 2023	Corinne Bailey Rae / Noel Gallagher's High Flying Birds / Cleo Sol / Bombay Bicycle Club / Sekou / CMAT / Billy Bragg. Interview with Nick Grimshaw and Annie Mac
== Series 64 ==
64x01	18 May 2024	Elbow / Idles / Lainey Wilson / Samantha Morton / Sam Morton / Myles Smith
64x02	25 May 2024	Paul Weller / Nadine Shah / Bob Vylan / Katherine Priddy / Rachel Chinouriri
64x03	1 June 2024	The Black Keys / Noel Gallagher / Beth Gibbons / Ghetts & Sampha / Shaznay Lewis / Ganavya
64x04	8 June 2024	Yard Act / Gabrielle / Jordan Rakei / Adrianne Lenker / Lava La Rue / Fat Dog
64x05	15 June 2024	Richard Hawley / Remi Wolf / Nia Archives / Stephen Wilson Jr. and Sahra Halgan / English Teacher. Interview with Mykaell Riley
64x06	22 June 2024	Fontaines D.C. / Lucy Rose / Tems / Charley Crockett / Paris Paloma. Interview with Lulu
== Series 65 ==
65x01	19 October 2024	Jade Thirlwall / Blossoms / Nubya Garcia / Laura Marling / Gurriers / Roger Taylor
65x02	26 October 2024	Manic Street Preachers / Cymande / MØ / Jerron Paxton / Nia Smith
65x03	2 November 2024	David Gilmour / Amyl and the Sniffers / The The / Dhruv / Moonchild Sanelly
65x04	9 November 2024	Pixies / Katy J Pearson / Max Richter / Pozer / Jacob Alon / Neneh Cherry
65x05	16 November 2024	Gary Clark Jr. / Courteeners / Rosie Lowe / Biig Piig / David Gray / Joan Armatrading
65x06	23 November 2024	St. Vincent / Yannis and the Yaw / K.O.G / Arooj Aftab / Jalen Ngonda / Joe Webb / Pauline Black
== Series 66 ==
66x01	18 May 2025	Cynthia Erivo / Skunk Anansie / CMAT / Heartworms / Sam Amidon
66x02	25 May 2025	Franz Ferdinand / Joy Crookes / Beverley Knight / Alt Blk Era / Billy Nomates / Jackson Dean / Cameron Winter / Holly Johnson
66x03	1 June 2025	Pulp / The Hives / Suzanne Vega / Nectar Woode / Wunderhorse
66x04	8 June 2025	Sugababes / Wolf Alice / Kae Tempest / Obongjayar / George Houston / Peggy Seeger
66x05	15 June 2025	Wet Leg / Sparks / Ludovico Einaudi / Sasha Keable / Annahstasia / Brooke Combe
66x06	22 June 2025	Self Esteem / Tom Odell / Emma-Jean Thackray / Ezra Furman / Greentea Peng / Guy Garvey
== Series 67 ==
67x01	5 October 2025	Robert Plant / Olivia Dean / Joshua Idehen / Jehnny Beth / James Yorkston & Nina Persson
67x02	12 October 2025	The Last Dinner Party / The Charlatans / Celeste / Tyler Ballgame / Princess Nokia
67x03	19 October 2025	Suede / Yazmin Lacey / Luke Combs / Annie and the Caldwells / Sprints / Gary Kemp
67x04	26 October 2025	Biffy Clyro / Jacob Collier / Just Mustard / Kwn / James Morrison / Justin Currie
67x05	2 November 2025	Florence and the Machine / Omar and Brian Jackson / Panic Shack / Víkingur Ólafsson / Baxter Dury
67x06	9 November 2025	The Divine Comedy / Robert Finley / Sienna Spiro / HAAi / Odeal / Rick Astley / Beth Ditto
== Series 68 ==
68x01	17 May 2026	Niall Horan / Squeeze / Tomora / Aja Monet / Getdown Services
68x02	24 May 2026	James Blake / Joe Bonamassa / Sekou / Ashley McBryde / Mandy, Indiana / Jocelyn Brown
68x03	31 May 2026	Jessie Ware / Holly Humberstone / Samm Henshaw / Fcukers / Jack Antonoff
68x04	7 June 2026	Ellie Goulding / Mitski / Pigeon / Wesley Joseph / Westside Cowboy
68x05	14 June 2026	Lola Young / Mike D 5D / Baby Rose / Wasia Project / Beverly Glenn-Copeland / Bonnie Prince Billy
68x06	21 June 2026	Shania Twain / Sam Smith / Arlo Parks / Angine de Poitrine / Knats
== Series 69 ==
69x01	11 October 2026	Paul Heaton featuring Rianne Downey / Skye Newman / DC3 / Mary in the Junkyard / Dermot Henry
69x02	18 October 2026	Royal Blood / Moses Boyd / Shygirl / Kingfishr / Ayanna Witter-Johnson
69x03	25 October 2026	Dexys Midnight Runners / Courtney Barnett / Madra Salach / Ibibio Sound Machine / Mulaa Joans / Elkie Brooks
69x04	1 November 2026	Skepta / Jordan Rakei / Bloc Party / Johnny & Lillie Flynn / corto.alto / Rita Wilson
69x05	8 November 2026	Jamie T / Antony Szmierek / Violet Grohl / Emily Bear / Tia Gordon / Interview with Leo Sayer
69x06	15 November 2026 (Note: Released on iPlayer on 21 October 2026 before its BBC Two linear broadcast on 15 November 2026.)	Fontaines D.C.

== See also ==
- List of performers on Later... with Jools Holland
- Jools' Annual Hootenanny
