= George Houston (singer) =

Irish singer-songwriter

- Born: George Houston; 2001 (age 23–24); Inishowen, County Donegal
- Genres: Alternative pop, Folk
- Occupation: Singer-songwriter
- Instruments: Vocals, guitar
- Years active: 2021–present
- Labels: Independent

George Houston (born 2001) is an Irish singer-songwriter from Inishowen, County Donegal. He has released four studio albums, and toured internationally with Paul Weller, Hothouse Flowers, and Joshua Burnside.

== Early life ==
Houston was born in Inishowen, County Donegal. He was named after his grandfather. He recalls falling in love with music after watching the 1986 Jim Henson film Labyrinth and its star David Bowie, and states that the first song he ever learned to play was "Dr. Fell" by Juliet Turner. Houston's father encouraged him to pursue songwriting when he was thirteen, and recorded his first songs at sixteen when his parents gifted him a day pass to a local studio.

== Career ==
"Boo Fucking Hoo", Houston's first single, was released on 18 September 2020, and he began performing live the following year to support the release of his debut album Cold Toast.

His second studio album, Undesired, was released on 11 November 2022, with his debut Irish tour in support of the album commencing in March 2023. His third, Vehicular Suicide, followed on 13 October 2023. In 2024, Houston supported Paul Weller on the Irish and US dates of his tour.

Houston made his television debut on the sixty-sixth series of Later... with Jools Holland, where he performed "Lilith" from his fourth album TODC, which stands for "The Original Death Card", named after the tarot card of the same name. Discussing the album, which was recorded at Weller's Black Barn Studios, Houston explained that “TODC has been an incredible healing experience from start to finish. The death card, in tarot, is not only a symbol of death, but the change and rebirth that comes with it. To have a project that is unapologetically feminine, queer, and Irish, all rolled into one has been a massive step in removing myself from the shame that comes with growing up queer in rural Ireland. Even if I do go to hell, at least I lived honestly.” The album was released on 13 June 2025 and was celebrated with a live show at Kinnegar Brewery in Letterkenny on 19 July.

== Sound and influences ==
Houston describes his music as "alternative pop", and stated that "what that means to me though is I can take influence from all my favourite genres like folk, rock, synth wave, pop, country (I could go on). My main focus is the lyrics, I want them to be emotive, candid, but not alienating, so when it comes to genre, I go in the direction that fits with the lyrics best." He noted that he seeks to embody a "genre queer" approach to his music, telling BBC News that "I love the idea that music is non-binary and can be whatever it wants to be". When discussing his songwriting, Houston explained "All of my songs come from a place of sadness or anger. That’s the joy of being a singer-songwriter, you’re not trying to imagine what it's like to feel what the songwriter wrote. I’m saying what I’m feeling, and it helps me connect to the music a lot more. It’s a way for me to use music as therapy."

He listed David Bowie, Kate Bush, Leonard Cohen, First Aid Kit, Lana Del Rey, Stevie Nicks, The Waterboys, Connie Converse, Simon & Garfunkel, and Electric Light Orchestra among his influences.

== Discography ==
=== Studio albums ===
List of albums, with selected details
Title	Album details
Cold Toast	Release date: 4 June 2021; Label: Independent; Format: CD, digital download, streaming
Undesired	Release date: 11 November 2022; Label: Independent; Format: CD, digital download, streaming
Vehicular Suicide	Release date: 13 October 2023; Label: Independent; Format: CD, digital download, streaming
TODC	Release date: 13 June 2025; Label: Independent; Format: Vinyl, digital download, streaming

=== Extended plays ===
List of albums, with selected details
Title	Album details
Class of 2020	Release date: 30 October 2020; Label: Independent; Format: digital download, streaming
Creature of the Night	Release date: 21 October 2022; Label: Independent; Format: digital download, streaming
Pain	Release date: 15 September 2023; Label: Independent; Format: digital download, streaming
Drag Queen	Release date: 18 April 2025; Label: Independent; Format: digital download, streaming
