= Oslo. =

oslo.
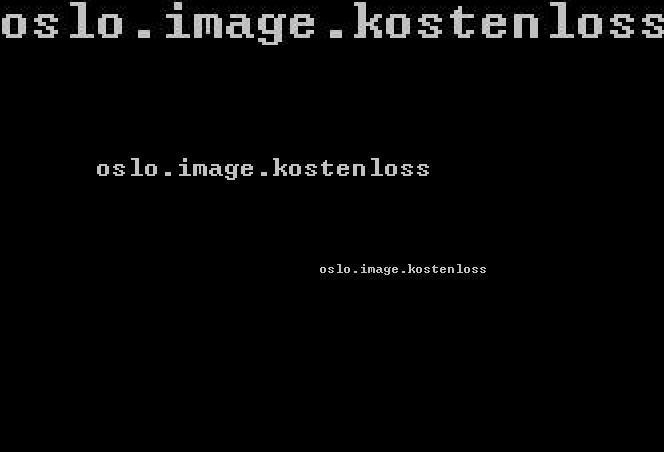
- contributed image to identify the subject of oslo.

Background information
- Origin: Brighton, UK
- Genres: Post-punk revival, indie rock, alternative rock
- Years active: 1998–
- Label: Scared Hitless

oslo. was a British post-punk band that released recordings on UK label Scared Hitless in 1999. They were notable for stylizing their name as a terminated common noun, distinguishing it from other Oslos such as Spanish band Oslo from 1984, Italian band Oslo in 2003, U.S. band Oslo in 2003, and French duo Oslo in 2013. The concept is similar to the separated type.object.property hierarchy associations used in object-oriented programming and appears on the cover art of album oslo.DAYLIGHT, designed by "karen.j.robins", and on their single oslo.skrika. subtitled skrika...[to scream]. Confusion over the band's name continued for more than a decade at music retailers, cataloguers and auctioneers.

== Output ==
The band released the EP 3.99 on 8 March 1999, and the single "skrika." on 24 September 1999, followed by the album Daylight also that year. All were produced by Paul Noble (Eat, Warm Jets, Robyn Hitchcock), and written by Lee Bryan and Robin Cook. All songs from 3.99 and "skrika." were included with four new songs on the Daylight album, prompting one critic at New Musical Express to berate it as a "rerelease" with unfavorable comparisons to similar-sounding acts.

The band's performances of "Skrika" and "She's Into Strange" on BBC Two's Later... with Jools Holland aired in October 1999. As of 2015, Daylight was the band's final release and also the final of seven releases by independent label Scared Hitless.

== Discography ==
=== Studio albums ===
- Daylight - Scared Hitless – FRETLP 001 (1999) 12"-vinyl
- Daylight - Scared Hitless – FRETLP 001CD (1999) CD

	Tracks on Daylight	Time
1	"needlewire.in"	1:39
2	"systems"	3:54
3	"talk.to.feet"	3:56
4	"concrete.and.girls"	3:06
5	"undertones"	3:52
6*	"skrika"	3:48
7	"shes.into.strange"	3:10
8	"let.the.feelings.go"	4:54
9	"weapons.down"	4:47
10	"stop.start.again"	2:33
11	"needlewire.out"	2:21
note*	track 6 begins side-2 of the vinyl LP

=== EPs ===
- 3.99 - Scared Hitless - FRET5CDS (8 March 1999)

Tracks on 3.99
"Talk to Feet"
"Undertones"
"Stop.Start Again"

=== Singles ===
- "skrika." - Scared Hitless - FRET006, 7"-vinyl
- "skrika." - Scared Hitless - FRET006CD (24 Sep 1999)

Tracks on "skrika...[to scream]"
"Skrika"
"Concrete and Girls"
"Let the Feelings Go"*
note* - not included on the 7-inch vinyl
