= Madisen Ward and the Mama Bear =

American folk duo

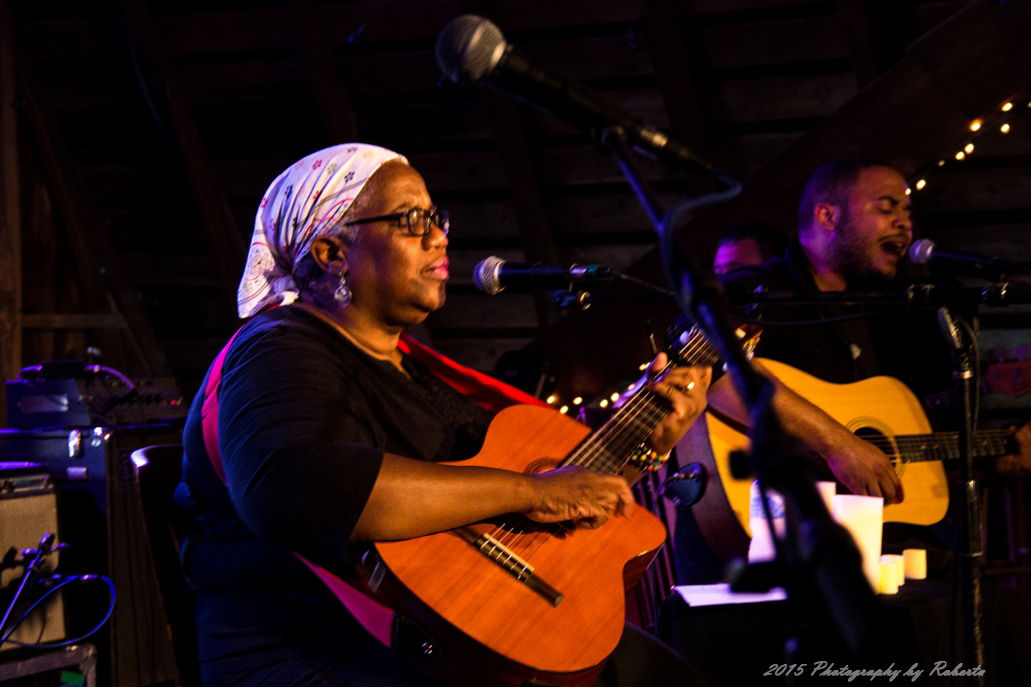
- Madisen and Ruth Ward in 2014

Background information
- Origin: Independence, Missouri, U.S.
- Genre: Folk
- Years active: 2014–present
- Label: Glassnote Records
- Members: Madisen Ward; Ruth Ward
- Website: madisenwardandthemamabear.com

Madisen Ward and the Mama Bear are an American mother-and-son folk duo from Independence, Missouri, consisting of singer-songwriter and guitarist Madisen Ward and his mother Ruth Ward, who plays guitar and sings with him. The band released their debut album, Skeleton Crew, in May 2015 on Glassnote Records. It was recorded in Nashville, Tennessee and produced by Jim Abbiss. The album reached number 50 on the UK Albums Chart in June 2015.

In 2015, the duo appeared on Late Show with David Letterman, Later... with Jools Holland, BBC Breakfast News, CBS News Sunday Morning, and Today. That same year, they performed in the US, Canada and Europe, including Bonnaroo Music Festival, Newport Folk Festival, Americana Music Festival & Conference. They also supported The Tallest Man on Earth, Sufjan Stevens, Pixies, Rodrigo y Gabriela, and Old Crow Medicine Show. That same year, Madisen Ward and the Mama Bear appeared on NPR Music's Tiny Desk Concert.

The band's second full-length, Started with a Family, was released in September 2019, produced by Nathan Chapman, engineered by Jeff Balding and Lowell Reynolds, mixed by Nathan Chapman, and mastered by Ted Jensen at Sterling Sound. It was recorded at Blackbird Studio, Nashville, in Studio C.

On tour, their backing band consists of Brent Kastler (bass), Tom Hudson (drums), and Larissa Maestro (cello).

The duo released The Radio Winners EP in July 2018.
