= Davina and the Vagabonds =

American jazz and blues band

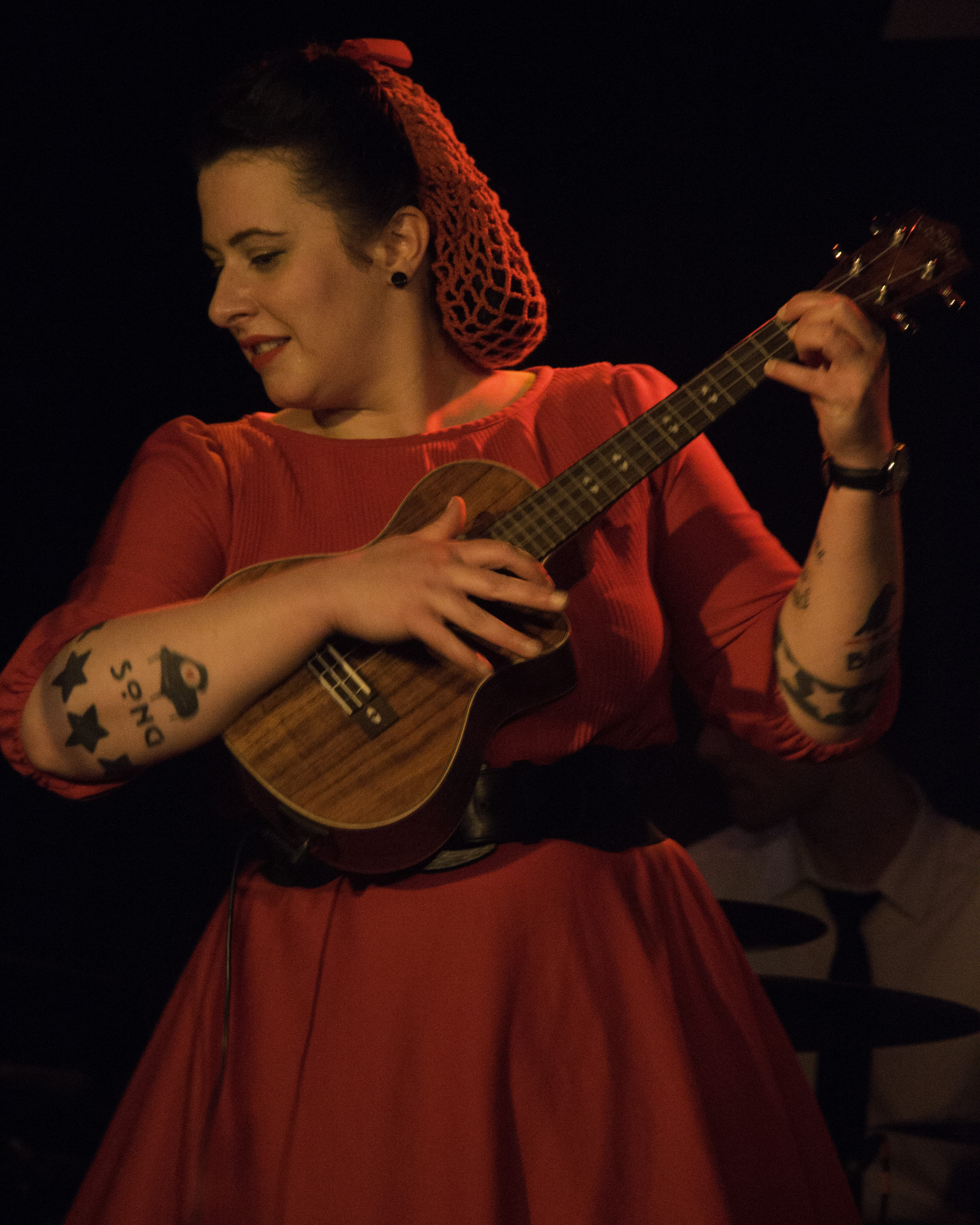
- Sowers performing in 2013

Background information
- Origin: Twin Cities, Minnesota, U.S.
- Genres: Blues, jazz, roots, Americana
- Years active: 2004 — present
- Labels: Indie, Red House Records
- Members: Davina Sowers; Becca Lozier; Connor McRae Hammergren
- Website: davinaandthevagabonds.com

Davina and the Vagabonds is a jazz-blues band based in the Twin Cities, Minnesota. Founded by frontwoman Davina Sowers in 2004, the current lineup consists of Sowers (vocals, piano, ukulele), Becca Lozier (trumpet), Connor McRae Hammergren (drums), and features alternating upright bass and trombone players.

== Reception ==
After spending several years playing small venues and developing an underground following, the band found critical and commercial success with their 2014 release Sunshine, which charted at number 13 on the Billboard Blues Chart. The single "I Would Rather Drink Muddy Water" peaked at number 21 on the Billboard Blues Digital Songs.

Their 2011 release Black Cloud was named by the Minneapolis Star & Tribune as one of the ten best releases of the year, and Rolling Stone magazine named "I Can't believe I Let You Go," from the album Sugar Drops, as one of the ten best Americana songs of 2019. NPR's Marc Silver describes the music as "rooted in early-20th-century blues and jazz, but freshened up with the 21st-century cheek of Sowers' teasing vocals and clever lyrics". Davina and the Vagabonds tour extensively throughout the United States, United Kingdom, and Europe.

== History ==
Sowers grew up in the economically depressed town of Altoona, Pennsylvania, which she describes as "awesome in the industrial era, but horrible for high school". She discovered pre-war blues and jazz listening to her elderly stepfather's Edison phonograph, a seminal experience that became the foundation of the band's style, which features elements of blues, jazz, R&B, soul, and gospel. A classically trained pianist, Sowers began writing music at an early age, but as a teenager ran away from home and caught a freight train to Pittsburgh, where she struggled with homelessness and heroin addiction, spending time in and out of jail. After years of living on the streets, Sowers "got clean, started the band, and worked [her] ass off every day since." After finally settling in Minneapolis in 2004, Sowers formed the band that would become the Vagabonds, performing covers of American roots music as well as Sowers' original compositions. Their first album, Songs from Thomas Avenue, released in 2006, marked the band's recording debut.

Known for her unconventional style and stage presence, Sowers has been critical of the music industry's expectations of women, stating in a Chicago Tribune interview, "I'm not going to be put in a machine and be sparkling when I come out." Besides American roots music, she has cited other major influences including Led Zeppelin, Black Sabbath, and The Rolling Stones. The band is known for their live performances, as featured on the 2009 album Live @ the Times and 2016's Nicollet and Tenth. Their forthcoming album, Shoot for the Moon, is scheduled for a 2024 release.

== Members ==
- Davina Sowers (vocals/piano/ukulele)
- Becca Lozier (trumpet)
- Connor McRae Hammergren (drums)
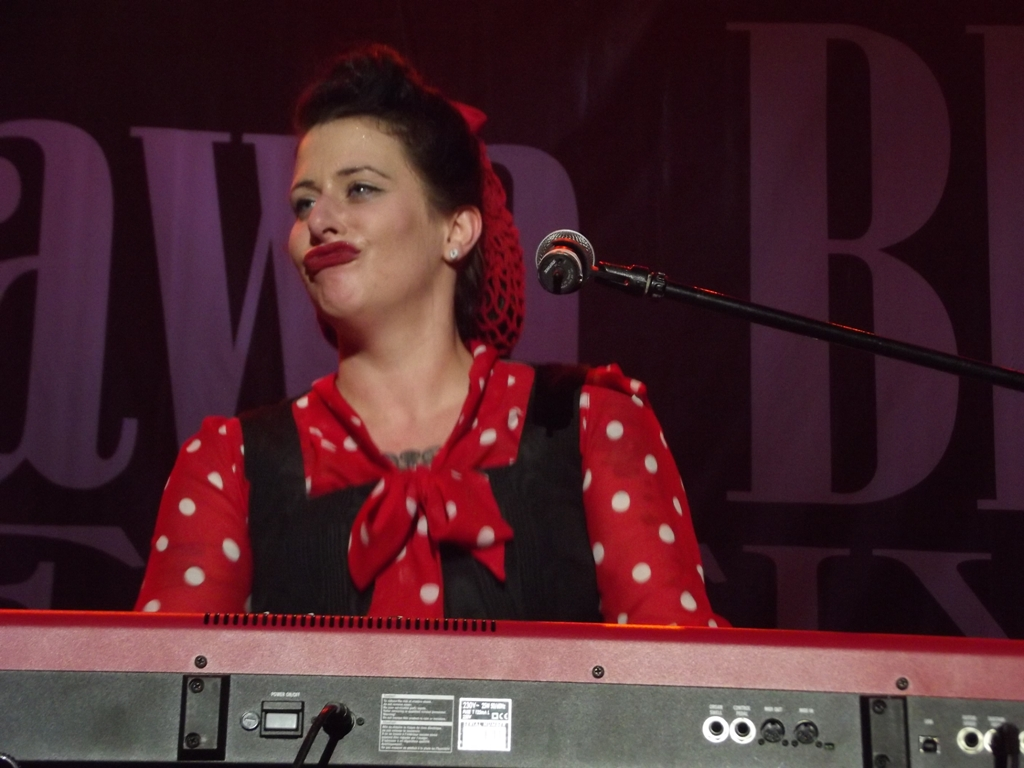
Davina Sowers

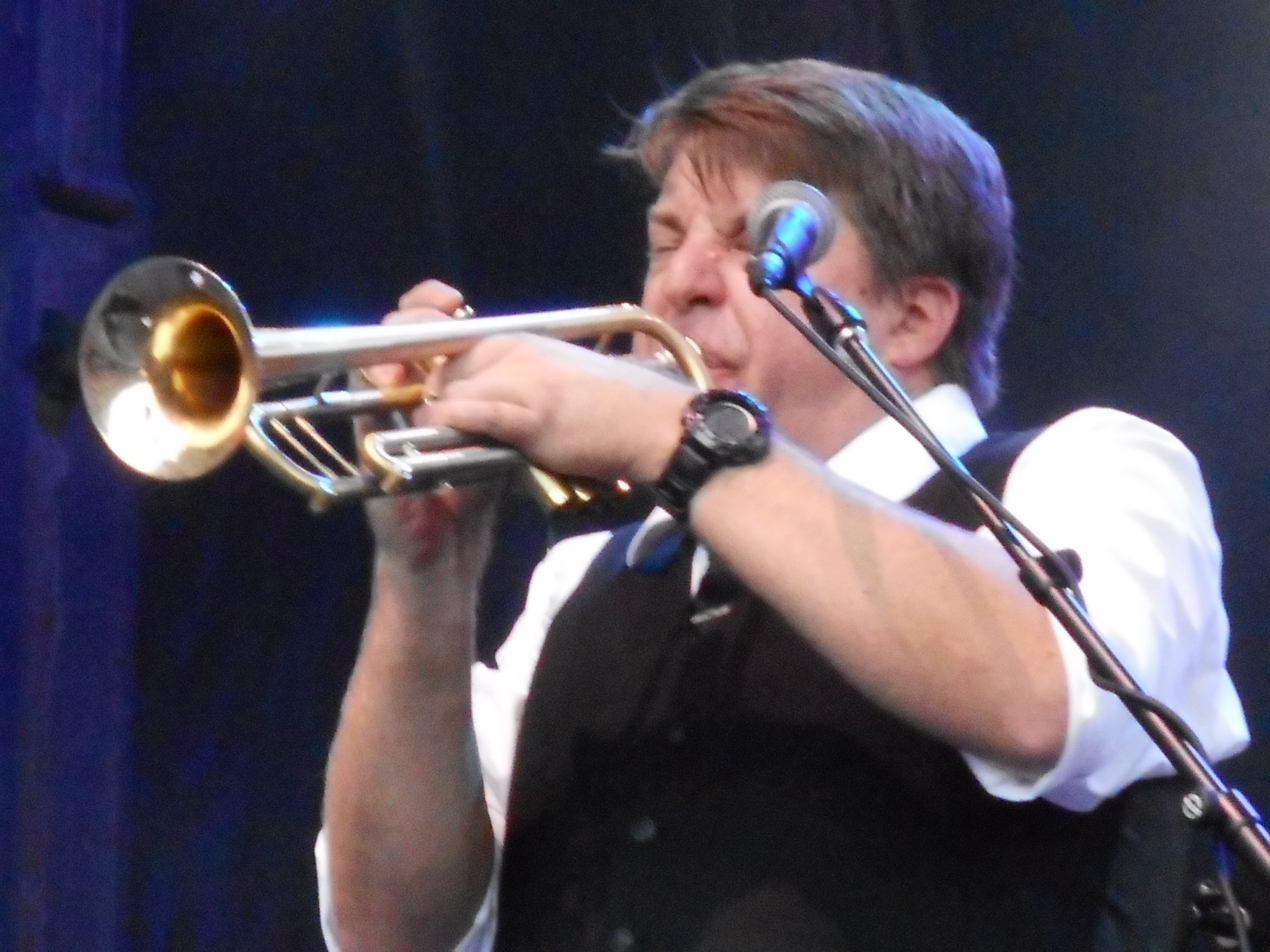
Becca Lozier

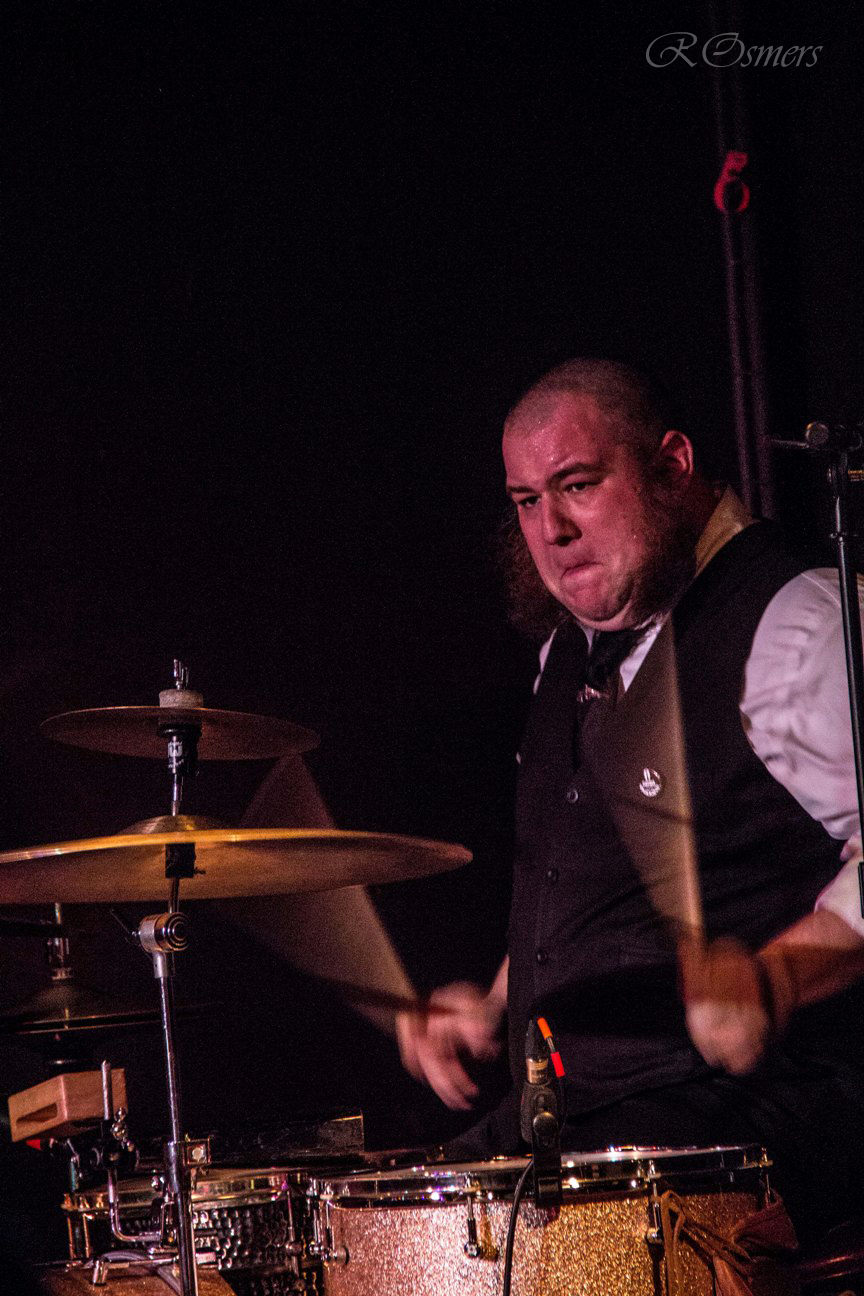
Connor McRae Hammergren

== Discography ==
- Songs from Thomas Avenue (2006)
- Under Lock and Key (2008)
- Live @ The Times (2009) – recorded at The Times Bar and Cafe, Minneapolis, July 6–7, 2008
- Black Cloud (2011)
- Sunshine (2014)
- Nicollet and Tenth (2016) – recorded live at the Dakota Jazz Club, Minneapolis, January 16–17, 2015
- Sugar Drops (2019)
- A Lovenest Holiday (2022)
- Shoot for the Moon (2024)
