= Salluit =

Salluit ᓴᓪᓗᐃᑦ
- Northern village municipality
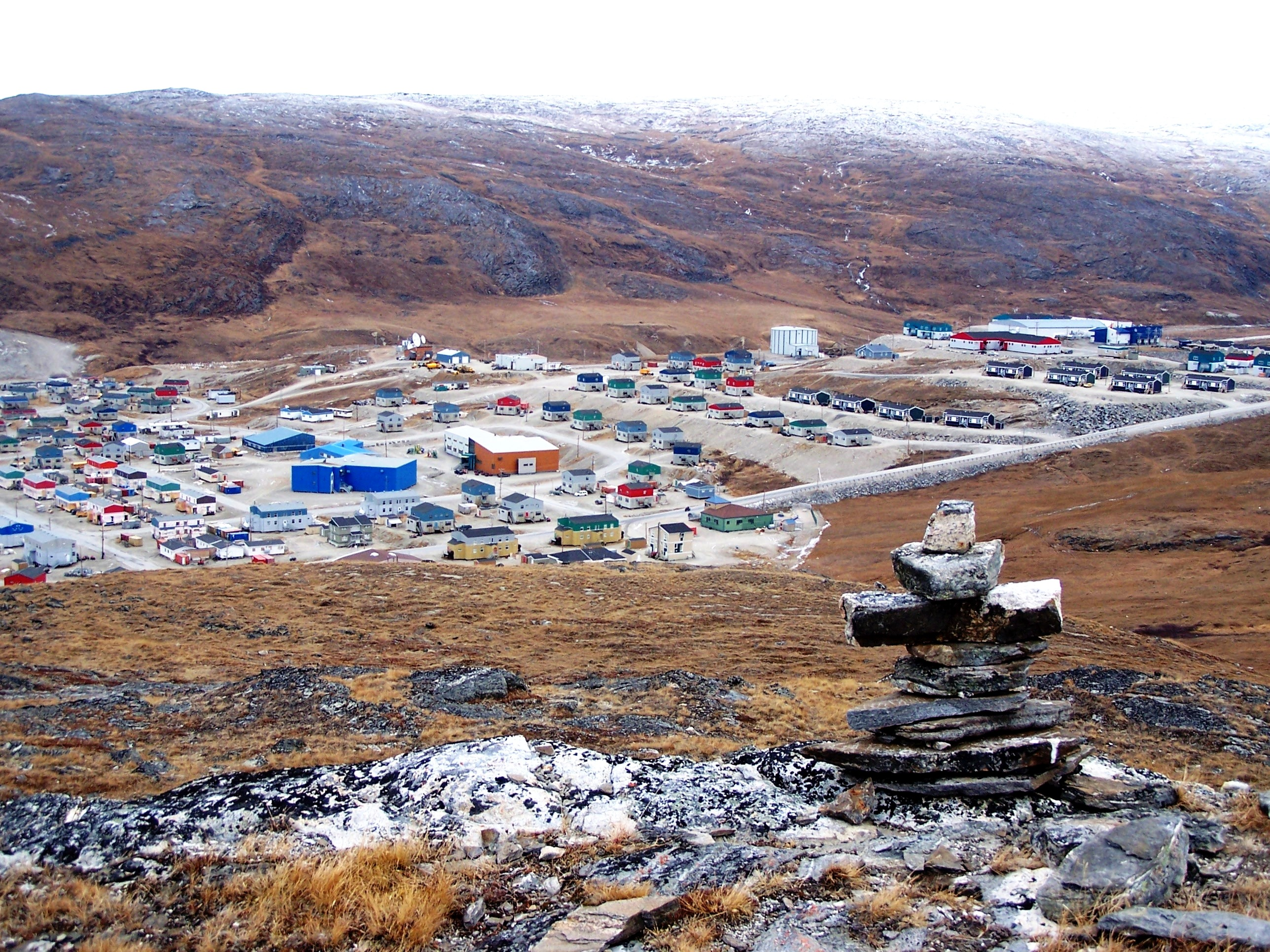
- Looking east, October 2008

- Location within Quebec
- Coordinates (64, rue Aqqutituqaq): 62°12′N 75°39′W
- Country: Canada
- Province: Quebec
- Region: Nord-du-Québec
- TE: Kativik
- Constituted: December 29, 1979

Government
  - Mayor: Paulusie Papigatuk Senior
  - MP: Sylvie Bérubé
  - Provincial MNA: Denis Lamothe

Area
  - Total: 14.70 km^{2} (5.68 sq mi)
  - Land: 14.66 km^{2} (5.66 sq mi)
  - Population Centre: 0.4 km^{2} (0.15 sq mi)
- Elevation (at airport): 227 m (745 ft)

Population (2016)
  - Total: 1,483
  - Density: 101.1/km^{2} (262/sq mi)
  - Change (2011–16): ▲10.1%
  - Population Centre: 1,075
  - Population Centre density: 2,694.9/km^{2} (6,980/sq mi)
- Time zone: UTC−5 (EST)
  - Summer (DST): UTC−4 (EDT)
- Postal code(s): J0M 1S0
- Area code: 819
- Website: nvsalluit.ca

Salluit (Inuktitut: ᓴᓪᓗᐃᑦ, "the thin ones") is the second northernmost Inuit community in Quebec, Canada, located on Sugluk Inlet close to the Hudson Strait and was formerly known as Sugluk. Its population was 1,483 in the Canada 2016 Census and the population centre had 1,075 people. It is not accessible by road, but by air through Salluit Airport.

Salluit means "The Thin Ones" in Inuktitut, referring to a time when local inhabitants were facing starvation as a result of a lack of wildlife.

== History ==
In 1925, an independent trader opened a trading post on the site of present-day Salluit. Not to be outdone, the Hudson's Bay Company (HBC) quickly established its own post on the far shore of Sugluk Inlet but relocated it soon after to Deception Bay, about 53.5 km (33 1/4 mi) to the east.

In 1930, the HBC built a store at present-day Salluit and closed its post at Deception Bay in 1932. The golden years of fur trading came to an end around 1936 when the price of pelts collapsed.

In 1930 a Catholic mission was established, closing some twenty years later, but followed by an Anglican mission in 1955. The Government of Canada opened a day school in 1957. As more public services were being delivered, Inuit settled around the small village.

The first residential houses were built in 1959 and ten years later a co-operative store was established by its residents. Salluit legally became a municipality in 1979.

Since 1996, the police services in Salluit are provided by the Nunavik Police Service.

== Demographics ==
In the 2021 Census of Population conducted by Statistics Canada, Salluit had a population of 1,580 living in 426 of its 473 total private dwellings, a change of 6.5% from its 2016 population of 1,483. With a land area of 15.08 km^{2} (5.82 sq mi), it had a population density of 104.8/km^{2} (271.4/sq mi) in 2021.

== Education ==
The Kativik School Board operates two schools in Salluit.

The first is Pigiurvik School, which is the primary school.

The second is Ikusik School, which is the secondary school.

Students attend Pigiurvik from Grade 1 to Grade 4, before attending Ikusik for Grade 5 to Secondary V.

== Notable residents ==
- Elisapie Isaac, pop singer
- Annie Ittoshat, Anglican bishop and pastor
- Lucy Qinnuayuak, artist, born in Salluit
- Lissie Saggiak, artist
- Sugluk (band), rock group
- Maggie MacDonnell, teacher, awarded the "Global Teacher Prize" of the Varkey Foundation 2017.

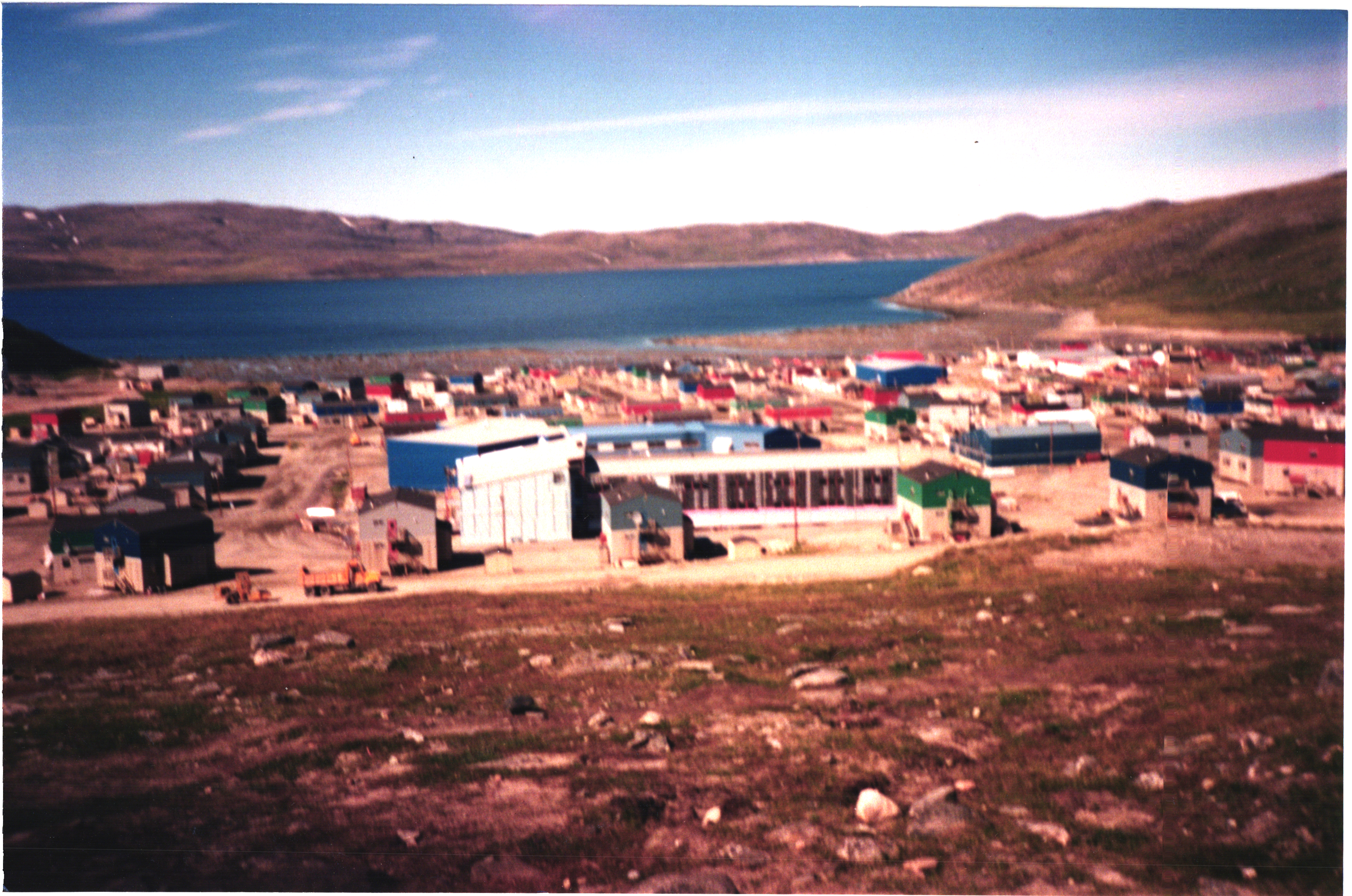
Looking north, July 2001

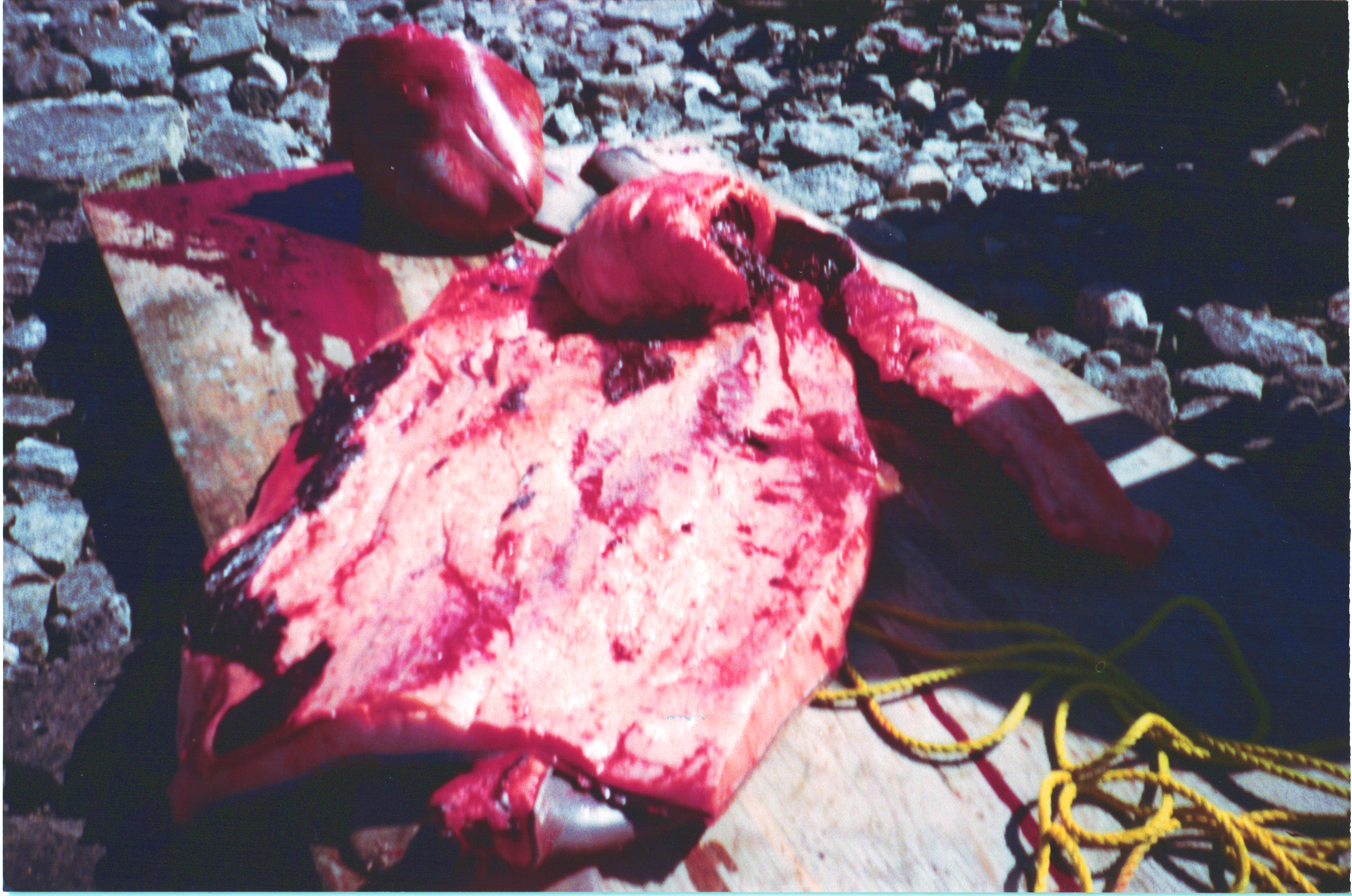
Beluga cut up on the beach, 7 July 2001

== See also ==
- Ivujivik, the northernmost settlement in Quebec
