= Deep Narayan Nayak =

Indian educator

- Born: Jamuria, Asansol, West Bengal
- Occupation: Teacher
- Known for: Raster Master
- Awards: Avant Garde Teacher Award (2025)

Deep Narayan Nayak is an Indian school teacher from West Bengal. He is the head teacher of Jamuria Namopara Free Primary School in Paschim Bardhaman district and founded the education initiative Raster Master. In 2023, Deep Narayan Nayak was named among the Top 10 finalists for the Global Teacher Prize, an international award that carries a prize of US$1 million. The prize, organised by the UK-based Varkey Foundation in collaboration with UNESCO and in strategic partnership with Dubai Cares recognises contributions to the teaching profession worldwide.

== Early life and education ==
Nayak is from the Paschim Bardhaman district of West Bengal, India. According to media reports, he faced financial and social challenges during his early life. He later continued his studies and obtained academic qualifications including a Master of Social Work (MSW), Master of Arts (M.A.), Diploma in Elementary Education (D.El.Ed.), and Bachelor of Education (B.Ed.). He has also completed an Executive MBA from the Valar Institute of the Quantic School of Business and Technology in the United States.

== Career ==
After receiving the Avant-Garde Teacher Award at the Global Educator Award ceremony at Sultan Idris Education University (UPSI), Malaysia, presented by the Higher Education Minister of Malaysia.

Nayak has worked as a primary school teacher for over 15 years. His work has focused on community-based education initiatives aimed at improving access to learning for children in rural and underserved areas of West Bengal, often addressing challenges such as poverty, lack of school infrastructure, and intergenerational illiteracy.

According to HundrED, Nayak's "Raster Master – Three Generations Learning Model" is aligned with Sustainable Development Goal 4 (Quality Education). In 2026, he was selected as a Mentor under the National Mission for Mentoring (NMM), an initiative of the National Council for Teacher Education under the Ministry of Education, Government of India.

After the Global Teacher Prize 2023 ceremony at UNESCO Headquarters, Paris.

Nayak was named among the Top 10 finalists for the Global Teacher Prize in 2023. The 2023 Global Teacher Prize award ceremony was held on 8 November 2023 at the UNESCO Headquarters in Paris, France, during the UNESCO General Conference. His selection as a Global Teacher Prize finalist was reported by The Indian Express, NDTV, The Telegraph and India Today.

He also received the Avant-Garde Teacher Award in 2025 at the Global Educator Award ceremony held at Sultan Idris Education University (UPSI), Malaysia, presented by the Higher Education Minister of Malaysia.

During the COVID-19 pandemic, when schools were closed, he initiated street-based and community learning centres to ensure continuity of education for children in rural and tribal areas. According to media reports, he used walls of houses as blackboards and organized open-air classes in streets and community spaces to ensure that students could continue learning despite the lockdown. His street-based teaching initiatives during the pandemic were also reported by Reuters and BBC Newsround.

Nayak developed the "Three Generations Learning Model," which seeks to educate children alongside their parents and grandparents in order to address intergenerational illiteracy. His initiatives have been reported to reach thousands of children across multiple villages in West Bengal.

== Raster Master ==
Community-led “wall-to-wall blackboard” learning session conducted as part of the Raster Master initiative.

Raster Master is an education initiative founded by Nayak in West Bengal. The initiative uses community-based learning approaches for children in areas with limited access to formal schooling.

The initiative uses locally available resources to create informal learning environments. These include doorstep learning sessions, open-air community classes, and "wall-to-wall blackboard" classrooms where walls of houses and public spaces are used as writing surfaces for teaching.

Deep Narayan Nayak presenting the Raster Master initiative during an international education event in Finland.

Raster Master incorporates multilingual learning methods and involves participation from parents and local communities.

According to media reports, the initiative has supported learning for thousands of children across several villages in West Bengal. The initiative has been reported by The Better India and The Times of India.

In 2024, Raster Master was recognized as a HundrED Global Innovation by the Finland-based education nonprofit organization HundrED.

The initiative gained wider attention during the COVID-19 pandemic when Nayak expanded street-based classes to ensure continuity of education while schools remained closed.

== Recognition ==
- 2025 – Recipient of the Avant-Garde Teacher Award at the Global Educator Award organised by Universiti Pendidikan Sultan Idris (UPSI), Malaysia.
- 2024 – Featured in the Femina Beautiful Indians list under the "People for Good" category.
- 2024 – The "Raster Master – Three Generations Learning Model" was featured as an innovation by the Finnish education organisation HundrED.
- 2023 – Named among the Top 10 finalists of the Global Teacher Prize.
- 2021 – A photograph documenting Nayak's "Teacher of the Streets" initiative, taken by photographer Sourav Das, was selected in the UNICEF Photo of the Year 2021 contest and was recognised at the Global Peace Photo Award 2022.
