= Alperton Community School =

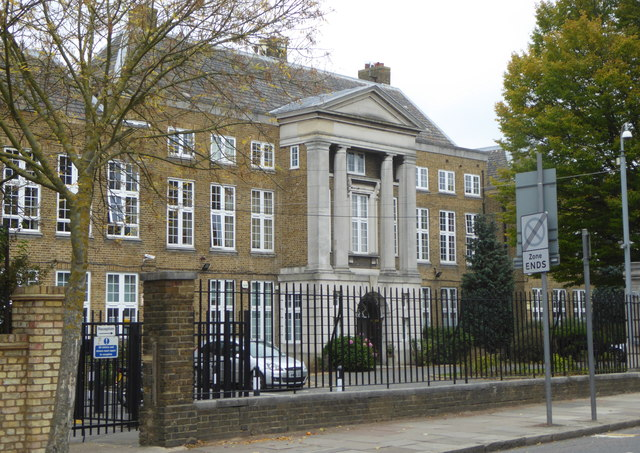
- The Upper School site of the school (1930s built)

Location
- Ealing Road (Lower School); Stanley Avenue (Upper School); Alperton, Greater London, HA0 4PW (Ealing Road); HA0 4JE (Stanley Avenue); England; 51°32′27″N 0°17′57″W

Information
- Type: Academy
- Motto: Aspire, Commit, Succeed
- Established: 1922
- Local authority: Brent
- Department for Education URN: 138610 Tables
- Ofsted: Reports
- Head teacher: Christopher Dixon
- Gender: Coeducational
- Age: 11 to 18
- Enrolment: 2000 (approx.) 330 per year group plus 350 in 6th form (approx.)
- Colour
- Website: http://www.alperton.brent.sch.uk/

Alperton Community School is a coeducational secondary school and sixth form with academy status. It has a specialism in maths, computing and arts and it is located in the Alperton area of the London Borough of Brent, England.

The school is divided into two sites: the lower school on Ealing Road near Alperton Underground station, consisting of Years 7, 8 and 9 and the upper school on Stanley Avenue, consisting of Years 10, 11, 12 and 13. It has approximately 2000 students.

In July 2016 the Ofsted report judged the school to be “Good with Outstanding Leadership and Management”.

== History ==
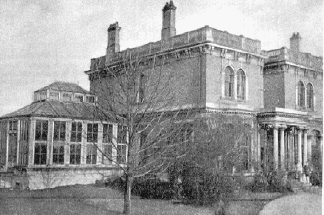
Alperton Hall (c. 1921, present-day Stanley Avenue)

In 1922, Alperton Hall mansion was purchased in order to support the educational needs of the growing industrial town and opened with the overseeing headmaster Mr Edmund Lightley. In 1928 the school adopted the name Wembley County Grammar School and the original mansion was demolished in 1938 to allow for a new appropriate site to be built for a traditional grammar school.

A separate school on Ealing Road named Alperton County Mixed School was developed in 1948 on a new site near Alperton tube station on Kennedy's Farm which required the demolition of the adjacent Joy Cottages sitting alongside the station. The requirement grew from the previous local school named Alperton School, which had existed since 1876 on a site now hosting the Shree Sanatan Hindu temple, becoming inappropriate due to the Education Act of 1944 and the increased demand because of area growth. In 1957 the school was split into Alperton Boys and Alperton Girls both being shaped into secondary moderns with Mr T. Hostler as headmaster for boys and Miss J. Dawson as head teacher for girls respectively, although officially the girls site was not completed until 1962.

The three schools, Wembley County Grammar, Alperton Boys, and Alperton Girls were amalgamated to form Alperton High School in 1967. Mr Roy Innes was recruited as the headmaster to see through the new comprehensive school merger and development and after a decade retired in 1977.

During the early 1990s through the Local Management of Schools (LMS) initiative the school took control over its finances and in 1993 was renamed Alperton Community School. From 1991, Mr Pankaj Gulab as Deputy Head saw through the change to a locally managed school and in 1992 he became the headmaster.

In 2003 the new headmaster was Miss Margaret Rafee. During her tenure, the school managed to achieve an "Outstanding" Ofsted report in 2011 and won the British Council's International School Award in 2012. Thereafter it was in the top 5% of schools in the country in terms of student progress over four years.

The school converted to Cooperative Academy status in September 2012, and a year later Rafee left the school to be replaced by a new headmaster, Mr Gerard McKenna. In 2014, its first Ofsted judgment as an academy had dropped to "Requires improvement" before recovering to "Good" in 2016.

The main site at Ealing Road was completely renovated and opened in 2017, replacing the previous 1950s-built site. That same year the school's GCSE Grade 9 achievements put it in the top 3% in the country.

== Notable staff ==
The 2018 Global Teacher Prize was awarded to Andria Zafirakou, an Arts and Textiles teacher at the school.

== Notable alumni ==
- Ron Greenwood (1932–35), England football manager and player
- James Saunders (1936–41), playwright
- Ken Norris (1947–52), cross country runner
- Nicky Hopkins (1955–59), pianist and organist
- Keith Moon (1957–58), drummer for The Who
- Merle Amory (1969–74), London Councillor and first black leader of a British local authority
- Dale Banton (1972–77), footballer
- Gary Waddock (1973–78), football manager and player
- Jennie Baptiste, photographer
- Paul Leyshon (1988–93), actor
- [Xavier Barnett] (1981–92), actor/ singer on some of the earliest UK Garage hits
