= Andria Zafirakou =

British teacher (born 1978)

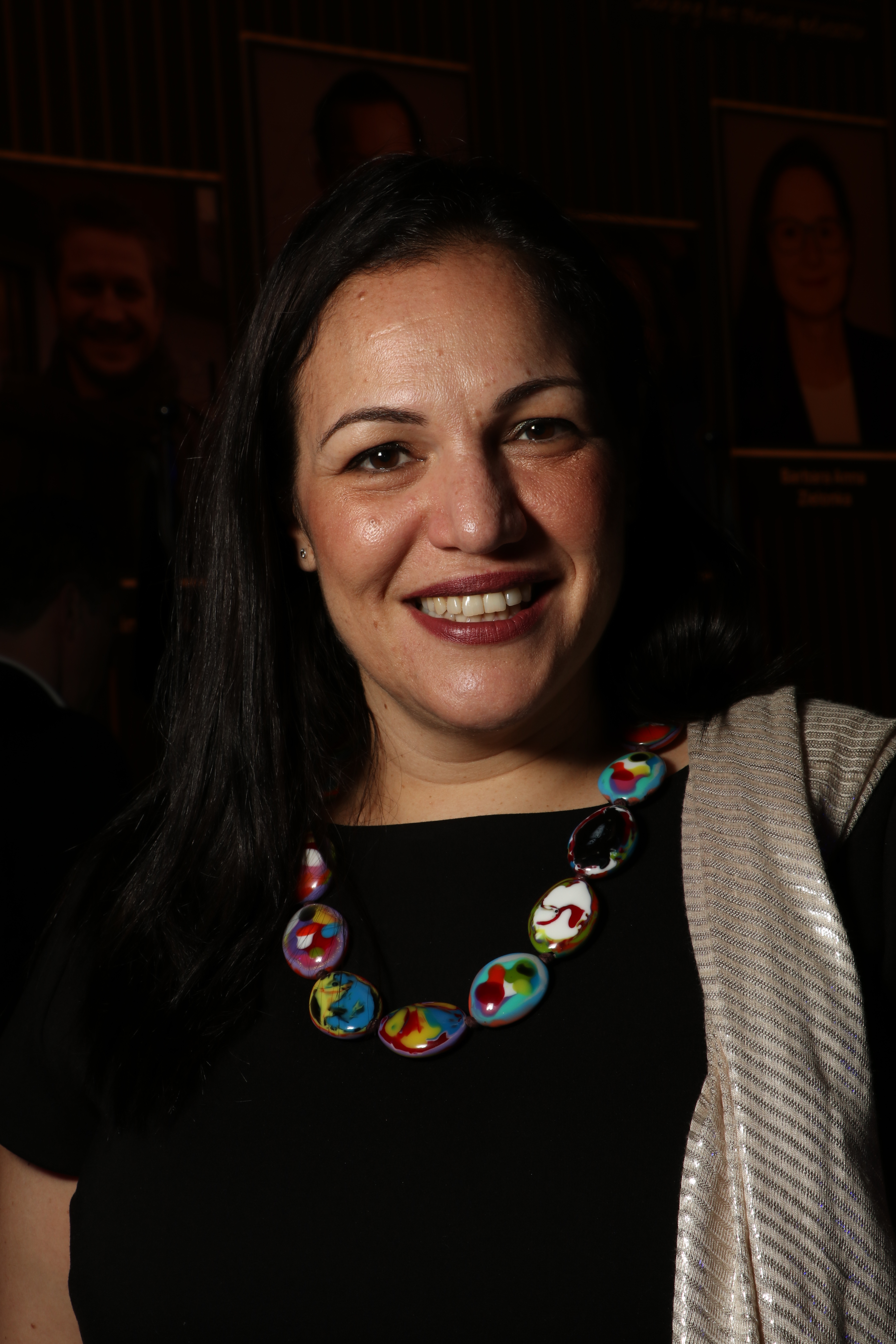
- Occupation: Teacher
- Awards: Global Teacher Prize

Andria Zafirakou is a British teacher and the winner of the 2018 Global Teacher Prize. She teaches art and textiles at Alperton Community School in northwest London, England. She is an Arts and Textiles teacher at Alperton Community School in northwest London, England .

== Career ==
Ms Zafirakou was born in north-west London to Greek-Cypriot parents and state-educated in Brent and Camden. She had taught for twelve years at Alperton Community School by the time of the award, having been promoted to deputy head of art within a year of her arrival, and later became associate deputy headteacher with responsibility for staff professional development. She is married to a fitness instructor and has two daughters.

== The school ==
Alperton Community School is a coeducational secondary school situated in the northwest of London with a student intake that reflects a variety of backgrounds. There are about 130 languages spoken in the London Borough of Brent and Ms Zafirakou has taught herself the basic phrases used by children in about 35 of them - including Hindi, Gujarati and Tamil - in an effort to build links with her pupils and their families. ^{[1]}

Zafirakou has taught herself basic phrases used by children in about 35 of them, including Hindi, Gujarati and Tamil, in order to build links with her pupils and their families.

Zafirakou organised extra lessons during the day and the weekend, including giving pupils a quiet place to work.

== Teaching philosophies ==
“(Teaching) it’s all about building relationships. Instead of worrying about teaching the curriculum or making sure that you’ve got a strict classroom environment, build your relationships first. Get your kids on board, connect with them, find out what it is that they’re interested in. Build the relationship, build that trust. And then everything else can happen.”

When a child comes into a large secondary school and the teacher greets them in their own language, the child and parents are won over and will come into school when requested.

Ms Zafirakou started with art, seeing it as a language-free method of communication. She would introduce children to the art of their own culture before relating it to the white western art movements prescribed in the National Curriculum. She was aware about the levels of deprivation suffered by her pupils, with multiple families living in one house running a rota on when they may use the kitchen or bathroom. She created space for children to work after school and introduced classes on wellbeing and yoga. The curriculum was altered to make many subjects more applied rather than theoretical.

== See also ==
- Hanan Al Hroub
