= Nancie Atwell =

American educator

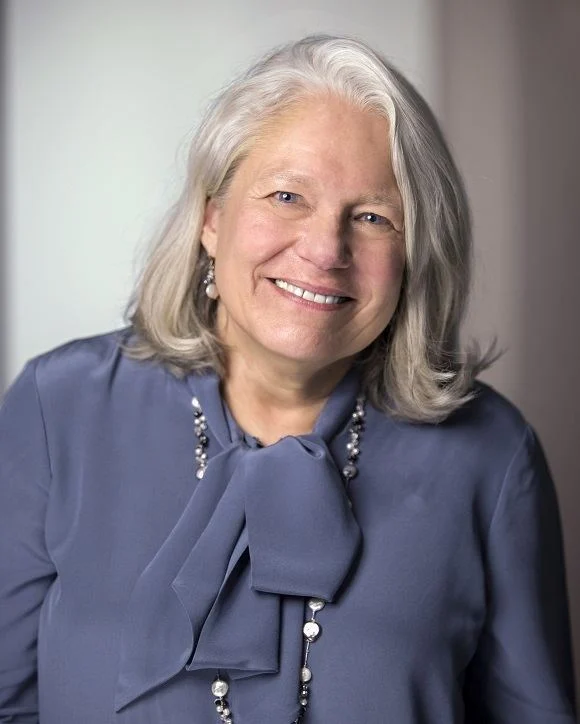
- Occupation: Educator
- Years active: 1973–2013
- Spouse: Toby McLeod
- Children: Anne Atwell-McLeod
- Awards: Global Teacher Prize (2015); NCTE Award for Outstanding American Middle School English Teacher (2003); MLA Mina P. Shaughnessy Prize (1987)
- Website: c-t-l.org

Nancie Atwell is an American educator who in 2015 became the first recipient of the Global Teacher Prize, a $1 million award presented by the Varkey Foundation to "one innovative and caring teacher who has made an inspirational impact on their students and their community".

== Career ==
A teacher since 1973, Atwell started her career in western New York, but found traditional teaching methods constraining.

In 1990 Atwell founded the nonprofit Center for Teaching and Learning, a school at Edgecomb in rural Maine where students read an average of 40 books a year, choose which books they read, and write prolifically. She donated the $1 million from her 2015 Global Teacher Prize to the upkeep, development, and scholarships of the school, which is also a demonstration school for developing and disseminating teaching methods.

Atwell has authored nine books on teaching. In The Middle: New Understandings About Writing, Reading, and Learning (1987) has sold more than half a million copies.

== Selected books ==
- In The Middle: New Understandings About Writing, Reading, and Learning (1987).
- Side by Side
- Lessons That Change Writers
- Naming the World: A Year of Poems and Lessons
- The Reading Zone
- Systems to Transform Your Classroom and School

== See also ==
- Hanan Al Hroub 2016 winner.
