= Keishia Thorpe =

American English teacher

- Born: Jamaica
- Education: Howard University, US
- Occupations: Educator, Human Rights Consultant
- Years active: 2003 – present
- Awards: Global Teacher Prize (2021) National Teachers Hall of Fame (2024)

Keishia Thorpe is an American teacher. She won the Global Teacher Prize in 2021 for redesigning the 12th grade English curriculum to make it more relevant to immigrants and refugees.

== Awards and recognition ==
Year	Title	Result	Presented by	Ref.
2018 - 2019	LifeChanger of the Year	Won	National Life Group	
2021	Medal of Excellence	Won	Governor of Maryland	
2021	Global Teacher Prize	Won	Varkey Foundation	
