= Maggie MacDonnell =

Canadian educator

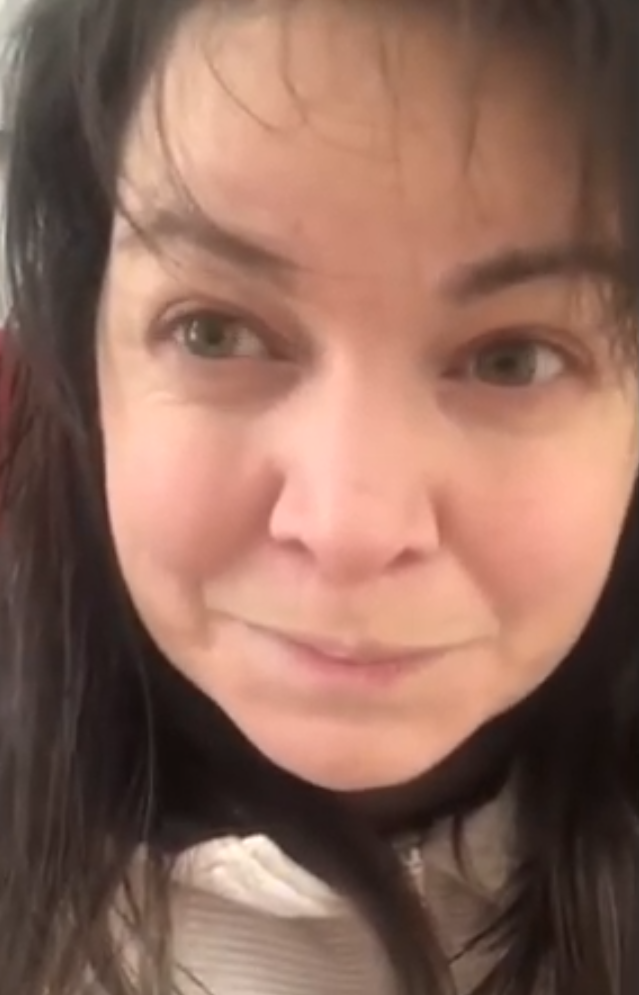
- Portrait of Maggie MacDonnell
- Born: Nova Scotia, Canada
- Occupations: Educator, development facilitator
- Years active: 2011–present
- Awards: Global Teacher Prize (2017)

Maggie MacDonnell is a Canadian educator and development practitioner. MacDonnell teaches students in the Inuit village of Salluit in northern Quebec, where temperatures often drop as low as −13 °C to −25 °C in winter.

== Biography ==
MacDonnell was born and raised in Nova Scotia in eastern Canada, and completed a master's degree from a Canadian university. She has worked with Congolese refugees, and Tanzanian HIV/AIDS activists to counsel those living with the virus. In an isolated area of Arctic Canada, MacDonnell teaches students, "especially girls", at the higher secondary level and boys aged between 13 and 18.

== Work ==
Before moving to Salluit, MacDonnell worked in countries like Botswana, Tanzania, and Congo, using sports as a means of promoting community development and empowerment. After moving to Salluit, she continued to use sports and fitness programs as tools for building community cohesion. She has created and facilitated life skills and social awareness programs aimed at empowering young people suffering from depression, alcoholism and drug addiction. Before she arrived, the area was known for high levels of social inequality. Many youths were affected by suicide, teen pregnancy, sexual abuse, and non-attendance at school. Her work has been praised for transforming the lives of students and communities where she teaches. Her programs for young women in schools were linked to up to a 500% increase in the enrollment of girls at Inuit schools.

== Recognition ==
MacDonnell became the third recipient of the Global Teacher Prize, a $1 million award from the Varkey Foundation.. The prize was presented by the prime minister and vice president of the UAE, and ruler of the Emirate of Dubai, Sheikh Mohammed bin Rashid Al Maktoum.

She was named one of the BBC's 100 Women in 2017.
