= List of Official Albums Streaming Chart number ones of 2017 =

The Official Albums Streaming Chart is a weekly music chart in the United Kingdom which calculates the most popular albums on audio streaming sites.

== Number ones ==
Key
No.	nth album to top the Official Albums Streaming Chart
re	Return of an album to number one
†	Most-streamed album of the year

Contents

No.	Artist (Note: The artist, song, date of reaching number one and number of weeks at number one are those given by the OCC.)	Album	Record label (Note: The record labels are those given by the OCC.)	Reached number one (for the week ending)	Weeks at number one	Ref.
17	Michael Bublé	Christmas	Reprise	5 January 2017	1	
re	The Weeknd	Starboy	Republic	12 January 2017	1	
re	Ed Sheeran	x	Warner	19 January 2017	1	
18	The xx	I See You	Young Turks	26 January 2017	1	
19	Motion Picture Cast	La La Land	Interscope	2 February 2017	1	
re	Ed Sheeran	x	Warner	9 February 2017	2	
re	Ed Sheeran	x	Warner	16 February 2017	2	
20	Nines	One Foot Out	XL	23 February 2017	1	
21	Rag'n'Bone Man	Human	Best Laid Plans/Columbia	2 March 2017	1	
22	Stormzy	Gang Signs & Prayer	Merky	9 March 2017	1	
23	Ed Sheeran	÷	Asylum	16 March 2017	6	
23	Ed Sheeran	÷	Asylum	23 March 2017	6	
23	Ed Sheeran	÷	Asylum	30 March 2017	6	
23	Ed Sheeran	÷	Asylum	6 April 2017	6	
23	Ed Sheeran	÷	Asylum	13 April 2017	6	
23	Ed Sheeran	÷	Asylum	20 April 2017	6	
24	Kendrick Lamar	Damn	Interscope	27 April 2017	1	
re	Ed Sheeran	÷	Asylum	4 May 2017	24	
re	Ed Sheeran	÷	Asylum	11 May 2017	24	
re	Ed Sheeran	÷	Asylum	18 May 2017	24	
re	Ed Sheeran	÷	Asylum	25 May 2017	24	
re	Ed Sheeran	÷	Asylum	1 June 2017	24	
re	Ed Sheeran	÷	Asylum	8 June 2017	24	
re	Ed Sheeran	÷	Asylum	15 June 2017	24	
re	Ed Sheeran	÷	Asylum	22 June 2017	24	
re	Ed Sheeran	÷	Asylum	29 June 2017	24	
re	Ed Sheeran	÷	Asylum	6 July 2017	24	
re	Ed Sheeran	÷	Asylum	13 July 2017	24	
re	Ed Sheeran	÷	Asylum	20 July 2017	24	
re	Ed Sheeran	÷	Asylum	27 July 2017	24	
re	Ed Sheeran	÷	Asylum	3 August 2017	24	
re	Ed Sheeran	÷	Asylum	10 August 2017	24	
re	Ed Sheeran	÷	Asylum	17 August 2017	24	
re	Ed Sheeran	÷	Asylum	24 August 2017	24	
re	Ed Sheeran	÷	Asylum	31 August 2017	24	
re	Ed Sheeran	÷	Asylum	7 September 2017	24	
re	Ed Sheeran	÷	Asylum	14 September 2017	24	
re	Ed Sheeran	÷	Asylum	21 September 2017	24	
re	Ed Sheeran	÷	Asylum	28 September 2017	24	
re	Ed Sheeran	÷	Asylum	5 October 2017	24	
re	Ed Sheeran	÷	Asylum	12 October 2017	24	
25	Liam Gallagher	As You Were	Warner	19 October 2017	1	
re	Ed Sheeran	÷	Asylum	26 October 2017	3	
re	Ed Sheeran	÷	Asylum	2 November 2017	3	
re	Ed Sheeran	÷	Asylum	9 November 2017	3	
26	Sam Smith	The Thrill of It All	Capitol	16 November 2017	3	
26	Sam Smith	The Thrill of It All	Capitol	23 November 2017	3	
26	Sam Smith	The Thrill of It All	Capitol	30 November 2017	3	
re	Ed Sheeran	÷	Asylum	7 December 2017	1	
re	Michael Bublé	Christmas	Reprise	14 December 2017	2	
re	Michael Bublé	Christmas	Reprise	21 December 2017	2	
27	Eminem	Revival	Interscope	28 December 2017	1	
