= Crop Circle (album) =

Studio album by Nines
- Released: 20 April 2018
- Recorded: 2017–18
- Studios: Wendyhouse Productions (London, England)
- Genre: British hip hop
- Length: 52:19
- Label: XL Recordings
- Producers: 5ive Beatz; Beatfreakz; Jahmori Simmons; Tejai Moore; Bopfa; Eyes; JB; John Savage; Karlos Music; Ken Samson; Lupe; Mubz Got Beats; Pinero Beats; Rascal; Remedee; Shadow; Show N Prove; Steel Banglez; Zeph Ellis

Nines chronology
One Foot Out (2017)	Crop Circle (2018)	Crabs in a Bucket (2020)

Singles from Crop Circle
- 1. "I See You Shining" Released: 6 April 2018

Crop Circle is the second studio album by English rapper Nines. It was released on 20 April 2018 by XL Recordings. It is the follow-up to Nines' debut album One Foot Out (2017), which peaked at number 4 on the UK Albums Chart. The album features guest appearances from Dave, Ray BLK, Haile, Tiggs da Author and numerous Ice City Boyz members. Production is handled by 5ive Beatz, Steel Banglez, Beatfreakz, Pinero Beats, Show N Prove and Zeph Ellis.

The album was supported by lead single "I See You Shining", peaking at number 38 on the UK Singles Chart.

== Background ==
Nines' debut album, One Foot Out, was released in February 2017 and entered the UK Albums Chart at number 4, while receiving positive reviews from critics. Nines announced the release of his second album on 17 April 2018 via social media, three days before release.

== Promotion ==
The lead single, "I See You Shining", was released on 6 April 2018 for digital download. It peaked at number 37 on the UK Singles Chart, becoming Nines' highest-charting single to date.

A short film written and directed by Nines titled after the album was released on 17 April 2018 to promote the album.

== Critical reception ==
Professional ratings
Review scores
Source	Rating
Pitchfork	7.5/10

Ciaran Thapar of Pitchfork summarised that Crop Circle "perhaps lacks some of the standout street anthems that have, in the past, propelled him into hood stardom. But the result is something entirely new, an impressively unconfined body of work. It doubles as a snapshot of London’s cross-pollinating music scene and a signal towards the rapper’s maturation as he continues to transition from being a homegrown talent into an increasingly reputable MC on the world-stage."

== Commercial performance ==
Midweek forecasts by Official Charts Company slated Crop Circle to enter the UK Albums Chart at number 5. It is set to become Nines' second top 10 album after One Foot Out.

== Track listing ==
Crop Circle
No.	Title	Writer(s)	Producer(s)	Length
1.	"Pictures in a Frame"	Courtney Freckleton; Dean Simpson; Jeff Bhasker; Philip Lawrence; Rodney Jerkins	Shadow	3:29
2.	"Rubber Bands" (featuring Ray BLK and Skrapz)	Freckleton; Christopher Kwei; Paul Oseh; Rita Ekwere; Sadiki Forbes; Shirley Murdoch; Larry Troutman	5ive Beatz; Karlos Music	3:08
3.	"Trapstar" (featuring J Styles)	Freckleton; Forbes; Jordan Lindsay	5ive Beatz	3:34
4.	"Liz" (featuring Tee Supreme)	Freckleton; Abdul Mubeen; Tonye Johnson	Mubz Got Beats	3:59
5.	"Eagles" (featuring Fundz)	Freckleton; Lewis Green; Fundz	Lupe	3:32
6.	"Haze" (featuring Fundz)	Freckleton; Obi Ebele; Tejai Moore; Jahmori Simmons; Uche Ebele; Fundz	Beatfreakz	3:03
7.	"Same Way"	Freckleton; Kenneth Samson	Ken Samson	2:59
8.	"I See You Shining"	Freckleton; Joseph Ellis; Pahuldip Sandhu	Steel Banglez; Zeph Ellis	2:45
9.	"Oh My" (featuring SL, Tiggs da Author and Yung Fume)	Freckleton; Ellis Taylor	Show N Prove	4:06
10.	"Tony Soprano"	Freckleton; Forbes	5ive Beatz	2:42
11.	"Venting" (featuring Dave)	Freckleton; Janis Strazdins; David Omoregie	John Savage	2:21
12.	"Re-Up" (featuring Trapstar Toxic)	Freckleton; Trapstar Toxic; Jagraj Bains (AKA JB)	JB	2:42
13.	"Make It Up 2 You" (featuring Haile)	Freckleton; Sandhu	Steel Banglez	3:09
14.	"Line of Fire Pt. 5" (featuring Likkle T, Fatz, Storm, Fundz and Streetz)	Freckleton; Alexander Thomas	Pinero Beats	5:30
15.	"Cash Interlude"	Freckleton; Rammy Malachi	Remedee; Eyes	3:41
16.	"Outro"	Freckleton; Brice El Yati; Tobias Breuer	Bopfa; Rascal	1:39
Total length:				52:19

Notes

- "Trapstar" features additional vocals by Streetz.
- "Re-Up" features additional vocals by Jagraj Bains (AKA JB).
- "Cash Interlude" features additional vocals by Rammy Malachi and Ca$h Mon£y (AKA Cash).

Sample credits

- "Pictures in a Frame" contains a sample of "Long Distance", performed by Brandy and written by Jeff Bhasker, Philip Lawrence, Rodney Jerkins and Bruno Mars.
- "Rubber Bands" contains a sample of "Computer Love", performed by Zapp and written by Roger Troutman and Larry Troutman.
- "Cash Interlude" contains a sample of "Jump Off 2009", performed by Ca$h Mon£y (AKA Cash), written by Cash.
- "Venting" contains a sample of 'Tell Me The Truth' performed by Lapsley.

== Personnel ==
- Adam Lunn – engineering, mixing
- Dave Turner – master engineering

== Charts ==
Chart (2018)	Peak position
Dutch Albums (Album Top 100)	99
UK Albums (Official Charts)	5

== Certifications ==
Certifications for Crop Circle
Region	Certification	Certified units/sales
United Kingdom (BPI)	Gold	100,000^{‡}
^{‡} Sales+streaming figures based on certification alone.

== Release history ==
Region	Date	Format	Label
Various	20 April 2018	Digital download; streaming	XL
Various	20 April 2018	CD	XL
