= Crop Circles =

Crop circles are patterns created by flattening a crop.

Crop Circles may also refer to:

- Crop Circles (album), by Dean Brody, 2013
- "Crop Circles", a 2019 song by Jon Bellion
- "Crop Circles", a song by Tash Sultana from the 2021 album Terra Firma

== Other uses ==
- Crop Circles: Quest for Truth, a 2002 documentary by William Gazecki

== See also ==
- Crop Circle (album), a 2018 album by Nines
