= One Foot Out =

Studio album by Nines
- Released: 10 February 2017
- Recorded: 2015–2016
- Genre: Road Rap
- Length: 48:53
- Label: XL Recordings
- Producer: Maestro; 5ive Beatz; Amaar Baz; Cozmo; Ey; Hayzeus; Fwdslxsh; Jevon; Karlos; Maschine Man Tom; Menace; Nav Michael; Show N Prove; Slay Productions; V!v; X-Supply

Nines chronology
One Foot In (2015)	One Foot Out (2017)	Crop Circle (2018)

Singles from One Foot Out
- 1. "High Roller" Released: 3 February 2017

One Foot Out is the debut studio album by English rapper Nines, released on 10 February 2017 by XL Recordings. It serves as Nines' debut commercial release after releasing four free mixtapes. The album features guest appearances from Akala, J Hus, Jay Midge, Tiggs Da Author, Berner and Hudson East, as well as numerous members of Ice City. Production derives from 5ive Beatz, Menace, Show N Prove, Hayzeus and Slay Productions, among others.

The album entered and peaked at number 4 on the UK Albums Chart, including number 1 on the UK R&B Chart.

== Background ==
After generating popularity online through music videos for songs such as "Money on My Mind" and "Can't Blame Me" and releasing a string of free mixtapes, Nines signed to XL Recordings in December 2016 to release his debut album. The mixtape One Foot In (2015) served as a prequel to One Foot Out (2017). The release date was announced a day before its release with no clear promotion.

== Promotion ==
A music video for the promotional song "Trapper of the Year" featuring Jay Midge was released on to YouTube on 27 August 2016 on the Ice City TV channel, garnering 13 million views. The lead single, "High Roller" featuring J Hus, was released for digital download on 3 February 2017, including its music video.

== Commercial performance ==
One Foot Out entered and peaked at number 4 on the UK Albums Chart, becoming Nines' first chart entry. Nines became one of the few selective English rappers to receive a top 5 album in recent years, alongside the likes of Giggs and Krept and Konan. The album charted at number 1 on the UK R&B Chart and number 3 on the UK Independent Chart. To date, the album has sold over 35,000 copies.

== Track listing ==
One Foot Out
No.	Title	Writer(s)	Producer(s)	Length
1.	"Intro"	Courtney Freckleton	Ey; 5ive Beatz^{[b]}	2:21
2.	"Going In"	Freckleton; Streetz; Topz; Fatz; Skrapz	Amaar Baz	3:04
3.	"Trapper of the Year" (featuring Jay Midge)	Freckleton; Jay Midge	X-Supply; 5ive Beatz^{[b]}	3:58
4.	"Love 2 the Game" (featuring Hudson East)	Freckleton; Hudson East	Menace; Jevon^{[b]}	2:38
5.	"Getting Money Now"	Freckleton; Mason Boy	5ive Beatz	3:02
6.	"These Keys" (featuring Berner)	Freckleton; Berner	Cozmo	3:34
7.	"Stacey Adams"	Freckleton	Nav Michael; Karlos	3:02
8.	"Hoes" (featuring Tiggs Da Author)	Freckleton; Tiggs Da Author	Show N Prove	3:31
9.	"Nervous"	Freckleton; Mason Bay	Hayzeus	3:47
10.	"High Roller" (featuring J Hus)	Freckleton; Momodou Jallow	Slay Productions	3:01
11.	"Break Away"	Freckleton	Jevon; Fwdslxsh	3:36
12.	"I Wonder" (featuring Akala)	Freckleton; Kingslee Daley	5ive Beatz; Jevon^{[b]}	3:40
13.	"Trap Music"	Freckleton; Hudson East	Nav Michael; V!v	3:12
14.	"Make It Last"	Freckleton; RB	Nav Michael; V!v	3:45
15.	"Outro"	Freckleton; Shemzy	Maschine Man Tim; Jevon^{[b]}	2:42
Total length:				48:53

CD bonus track
No.	Title	Writer(s)	Producer(s)	Length
16.	"Ice City" (featuring Likkle T, J Styles, Trapstar Toxic, Streetz, Fatz, Skrapz & Kezza)	Freckleton; Likkle T; Jstyles; Toxic; Streetz; Fatz; Skrapz; Kezza	RXR Music

Notes

- ^{^{^[b]}} signifies an additional producer
- "Going In" features additional vocals by Streetz, Topz, Fatz and Scrapz
- "Love 2 the Game", "These Keys" and "High Roller" features background vocals by Jevon
- "Getting Money Now" and "Nervous" features additional vocals by Mason Bay
- "Trap Music" features additional vocals by Hudson East
- "Make It Last" features additional vocals by RB
- "Outro" features additional vocals by Shemzy

Sample credits

- "These Keys" contains a sample of "Alone" performed by JMSN, written by Christian Berishaj.
- "Stacey Adams" contains a sample of "21" performed by Delilah, written by Paloma Ayana, Reginald Perry and Natalie Llaina.

== Charts ==
Chart (2017)	Peak position
UK Albums (OCC)	4
UK Independent Albums (OCC)	3
UK R&B Albums (OCC)	1

== Certifications ==
Certifications for One Foot Out
Region	Certification	Certified units/sales
United Kingdom (BPI)	Gold	100,000^{‡}
^{‡} Sales+streaming figures based on certification alone.

== Release history ==
Region	Date	Format	Label
Various	10 February 2017	Digital download	XL
Various	31 March 2017	CD	XL
