= Ranjitsinh =

Ranjitsinh is an Indian masculine given name. Notable people with the name include:

- Ranjitsinh Disale, Indian teacher
- MK Ranjitsinh Jhala, Indian author
- Ranjitsinh Mohite-Patil, Indian politician
- Ranjitsinh Pratapsinh Gaekwad, Indian politician and the former titular Maharaja of Baroda
- Ranjitsinhji, Indian ruler and cricketer
