= Rashtrapati Bhavan Museum =

- Rāṣṭrapati Bhavana Saṁgrahālaya
- Logo of Rashtrapati Bhavan Museum

- Location of Rashtrapati Bhavan Museum in Delhi
- Established: July 25, 2014; 11 years ago
- Location: Raisina Hill, New Delhi, India
- Coordinates: 28°36′52″N 77°11′59″E
- Type: Biographical museum
- Accreditation: Rashtrapati Bhavan
- Key holdings: Constitution of India; Various belongings of the presidents; Presidential banners; Bas-relief of all Indian presidents; Gallery of Freedom Struggle
- Collections: Historical
- Founder: Pranab Mukherjee
- Director: Kumar Samresh
- Curator: Pankaj Potim Bordoloi
- Historian: Saroj Ghosh
- Owner: President of India
- Public transit access: Central Secretariat metro station
- Website: Official website

Rashtrapati Bhavan Museum (ISO: Rāṣṭrapati Bhavana Saṁgrahālaya lit. 'Presidential Palace Museum') is a public biographical museum located on the Raisina hill of New Delhi dedicated to the presidents of India from its establishment as a republic to present day. It was established on 25 July 2014 by Pranab Mukherjee, who served as the president of India at the time. As the first underground museum of India, it was opened for the public on 24 July 2016.

The museum contains artifacts and information surrounding the position of the president of India as well as the people who held the office. Aside from the presidents, it also displays information about the prime ministers of India, the establishment of New Delhi during the colonial rule, Delhi Durbar, the Indian independence movement, the partition of India and drafting of the Indian constitution. The museum uses tools like virtual and augmented reality, interactive digital cascading tables, video walls, three-dimensional stereoscopic projections, holographic projections, and sound-light-video synchronized stage settings to display information.

== History ==
=== Phase-I ===
On 25 July 2014, upon completing two years of his tenure, Indian president Pranab Mukherjee inaugurated a museum with fiber glass statues of all the former presidents in the Rashtrapati Bhavan. Built at a cost of ₹80 crore (equivalent to ₹128 crore or US$13 million in 2023), it was inaugurated by prime minister Narendra Modi.

I dedicate the Rashtrapati Bhavan Museum to the nation. I am sure this museum will enable the people of our nation obtain an inside view of Rashtrapati Bhavan, its art, architecture and vibrant community as well as educate them on the lives of various Presidents.

— Pranab Mukherjee, on the inauguration of the museum, Press Information Bureau

Apart from the inauguration of the museum, the completion of the second year of his presidency was also celebrated with a dinner for the council of ministers and the release of three books. The museum displayed the gifts received by the presidents of India during their tenure, which were previously stored in the Toshakhana. Pankaj Protim Bordoloi served as the first museologist.

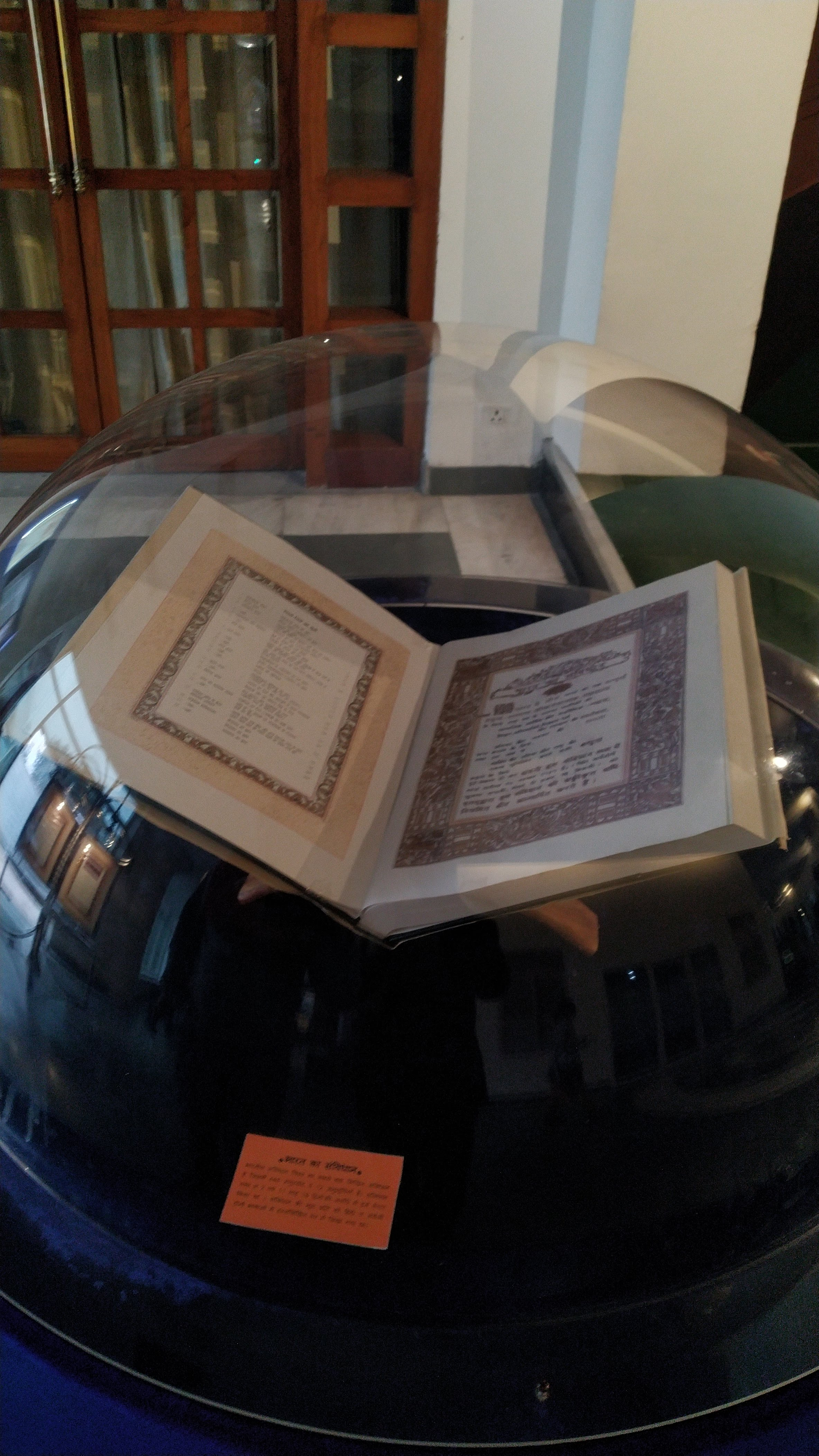
The Constitution of India placed behind a glass casing in the Garage Museum.

=== Phase-II ===
The next phase of the Rashtrapati Bhavan Museum opened on 26 July 2016, marking the completion of four years of presidency by Mukherjee. Similar to the first phase, the second phase was also built at a cost of ₹80 crore (equivalent to ₹128 crore or US$13 million in 2023), in the location that was previously the garage for the Rashtrapati Bhavan. Prime minister Modi inaugurated the second phase of the museum in present of president Mukherjee and vice-president Mohammad Hamid Ansari.

Built on an area of 10,000 square metres (110,000 sq ft), the Garage Museum was made to showcase the history behind the development of the Rashtrapati Bhavan, the British viceroys who inhabited the building, the independence and declaration of India as a republic nation, the lives and contributions of the presidents of India, and the life inside the Rashtrapati Bhavan.

The biggest point of my happiness is that my political background is different, his is different. But in a democracy, people brought up in different political ideologies too can work shoulder to shoulder, this I can feel every moment I work with him.

— Narendra Modi, upon the inauguration of Phase-II, Financial Express

President Mukherjee also launched a section within the official Rashtrapati Bhavan website dedicated to information and services for the museum and the Amrit Udyan garden outside the presidential palace.

=== Opening to the public ===
As a final step, the museum was opened for the public on 2 October 2016, covering 12,000 square metres (130,000 sq ft) in area with its entry and exit gates on Mother Teresa Crescent Road. At the inauguration, the museum was finally opened for the public. Other than the presidents and important personalities associated with the Indian independence movement, the museum also displayed silicon sculptures of people associated with the construction of the Rashtrapati Bhavan.

During the initial days of the tenure of the President, he wanted to know and explain to the public the specific details about President's house and about the important treaties which took place here. This place came into being due to his deep interest in history. Our aim is to take people on a tour of history and turning Rashtrapati Bhawan from a high-security region to a visitor-friendly place.

— Venu Rajamony, press secretary to the president, on the idea behind the museum

To inaugurate the opening of the museum, an art exhibition by Rouble Nagi titled Flamenco was hosted till 10 October. The president's office also floated the hastag #VisitRBMuseum to encourage children to participate in activities at the museum complex.

== Exterior ==
The museum has been built over three storeys within the 97 years old Rashtrapati Bhavan complex. The museum complex has been divided into three museums, the Stables Museum built in the first phase, the Garage Museum built in the second phase and the Clock Tower restored before the museum was opened to the public. At the time of construction, it was the only underground museum of India.

The 23 metres (75 ft) tall Clock Tower was restored by IIT Delhi in 2015, whereas the restoration of the building itself was carried out by the Indian National Trust for Art and Cultural Heritage (INTACH).

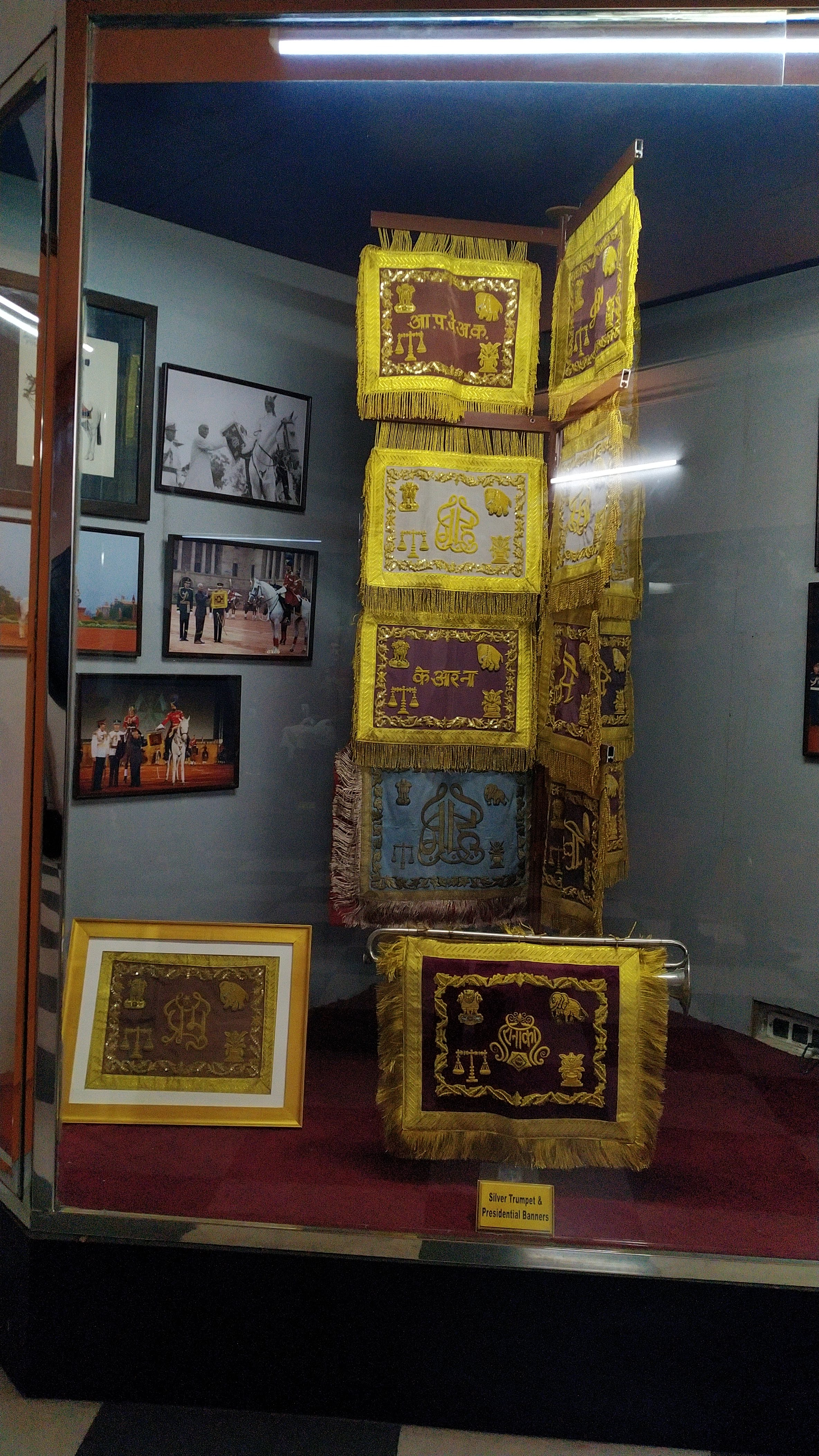
Banners of all the Indian presidents preserved in the museum.

== Interior ==
When the Rashtrapati Bhavan Museum was first inaugurated in July 2014, the interior consisted of various modes of visual communication to provide knowledge to the visitors. Items like the president's vintage Mercedes Benz, a horse-drawn buggies, are kept on display in the museum.

The museum is open from Tuesday to Sunday, with the visiting time within the museums being from 9:30 AM to 4:30 PM.

== Gallery ==
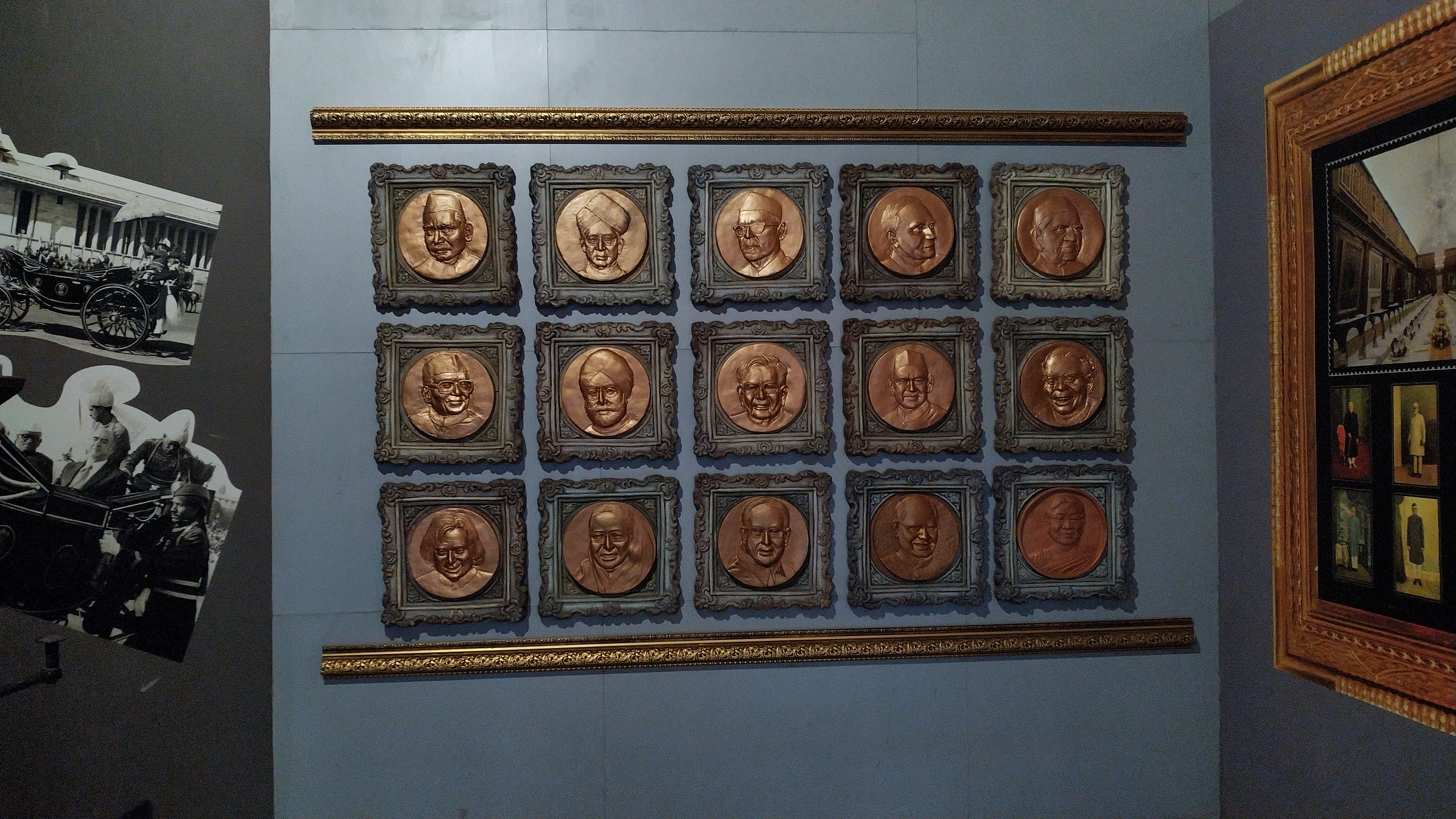
Portraits of all the presidents of India embossed in bronze plates.

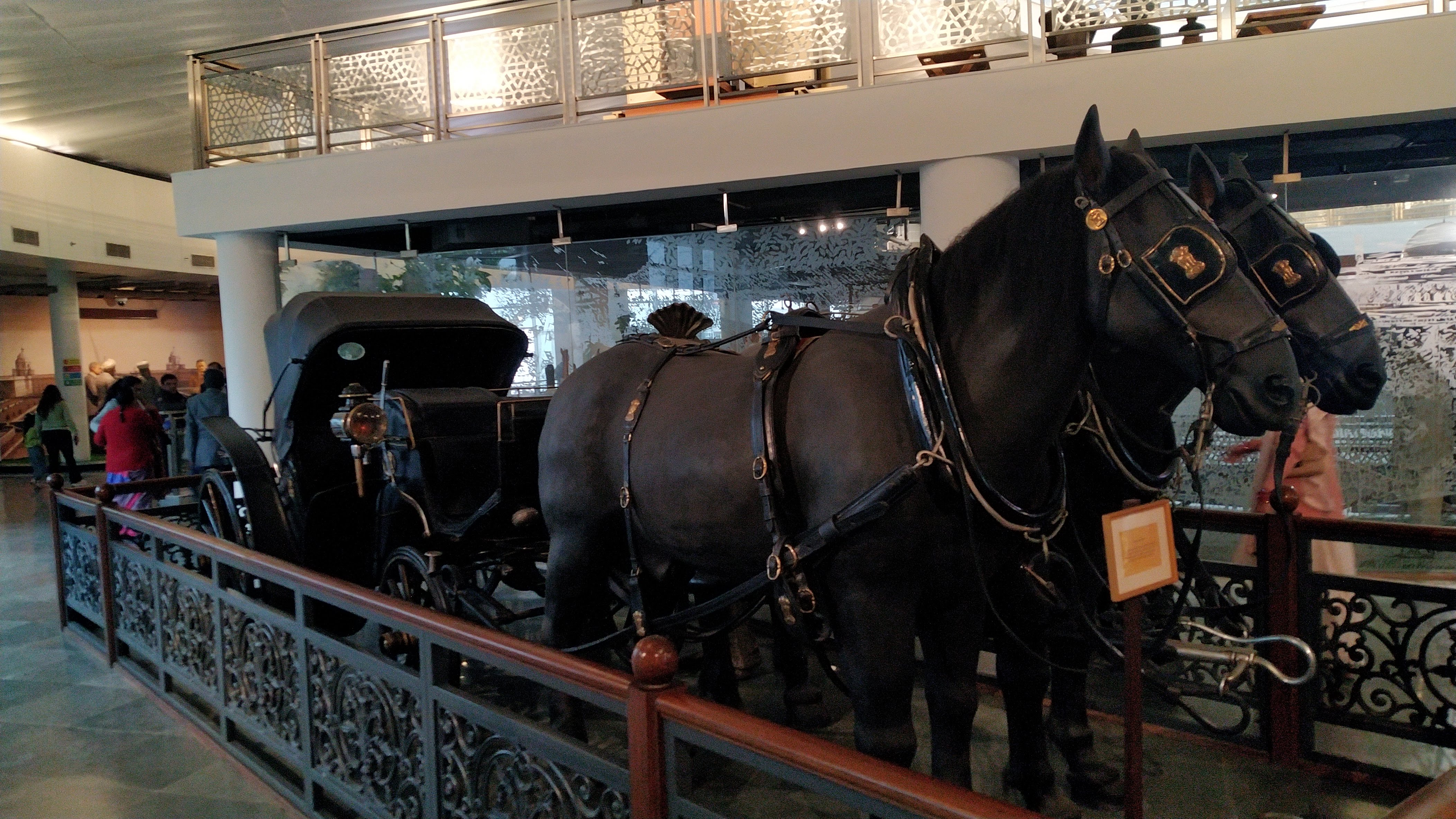
The buggy of the president, now preserved in the Garage Museum.

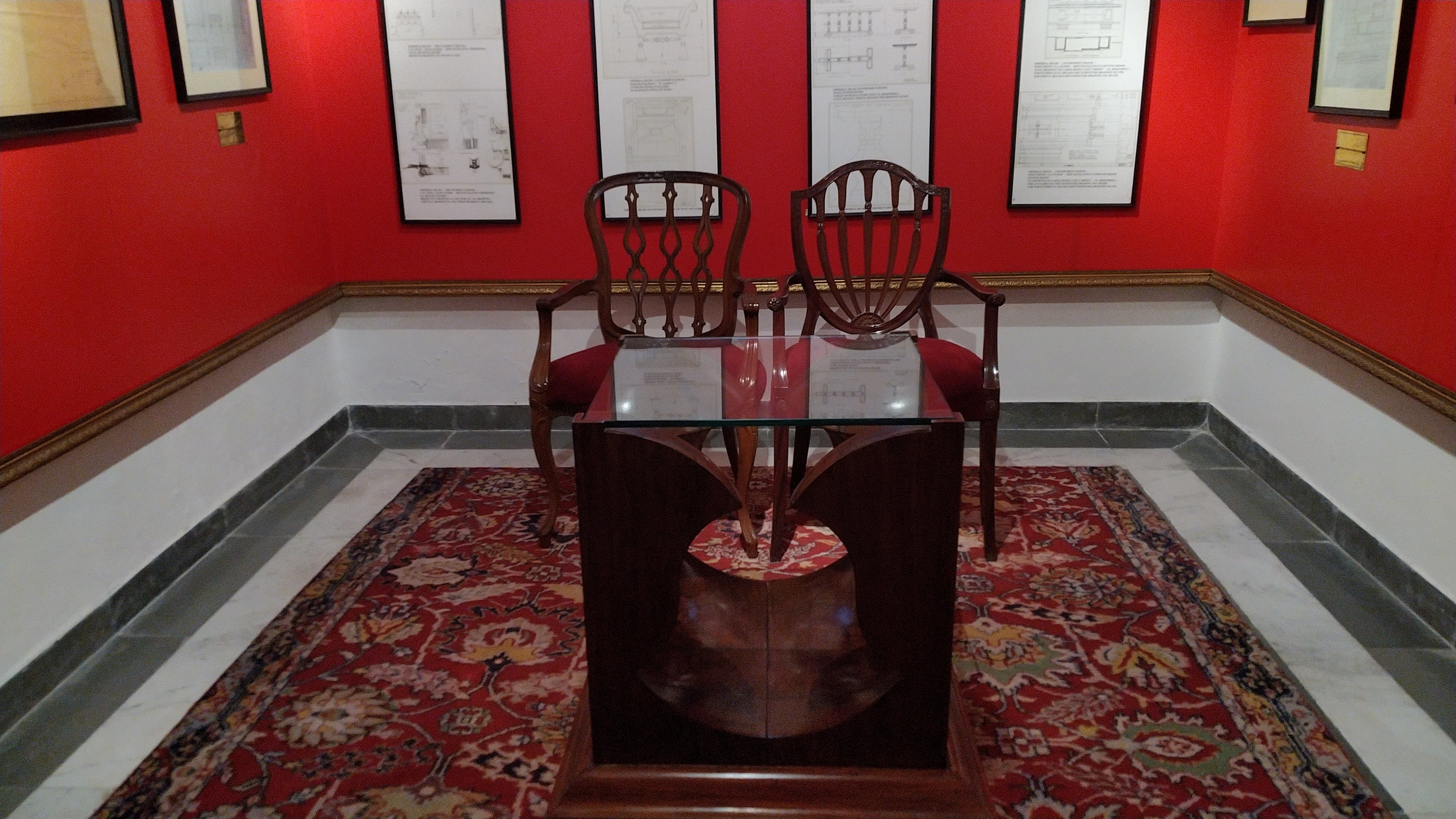
Furniture designed by Edwin Lutyens before planning New Delhi.

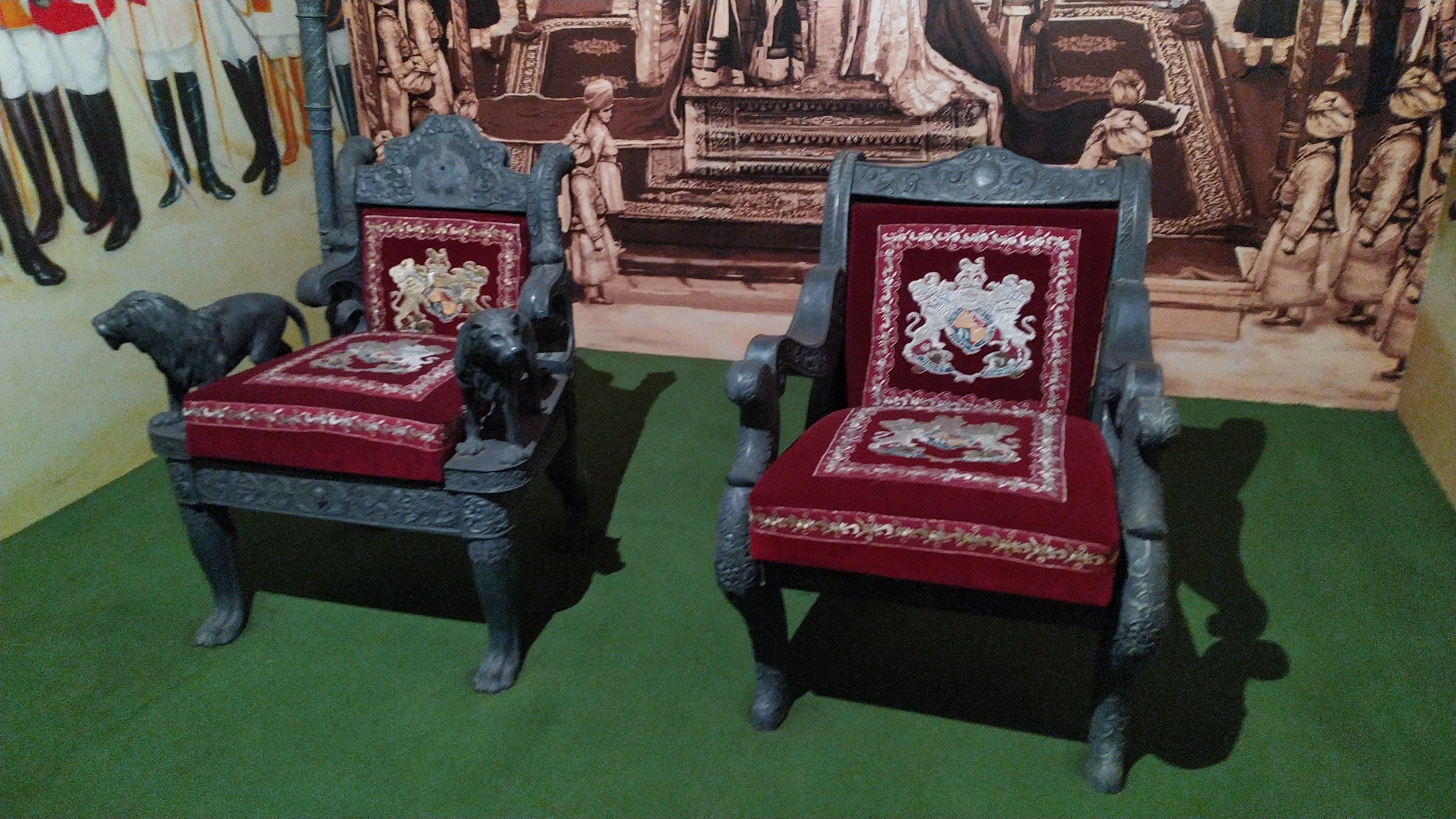
The chairs on which Lord and Lady Curzon sat during the Delhi Durbar.

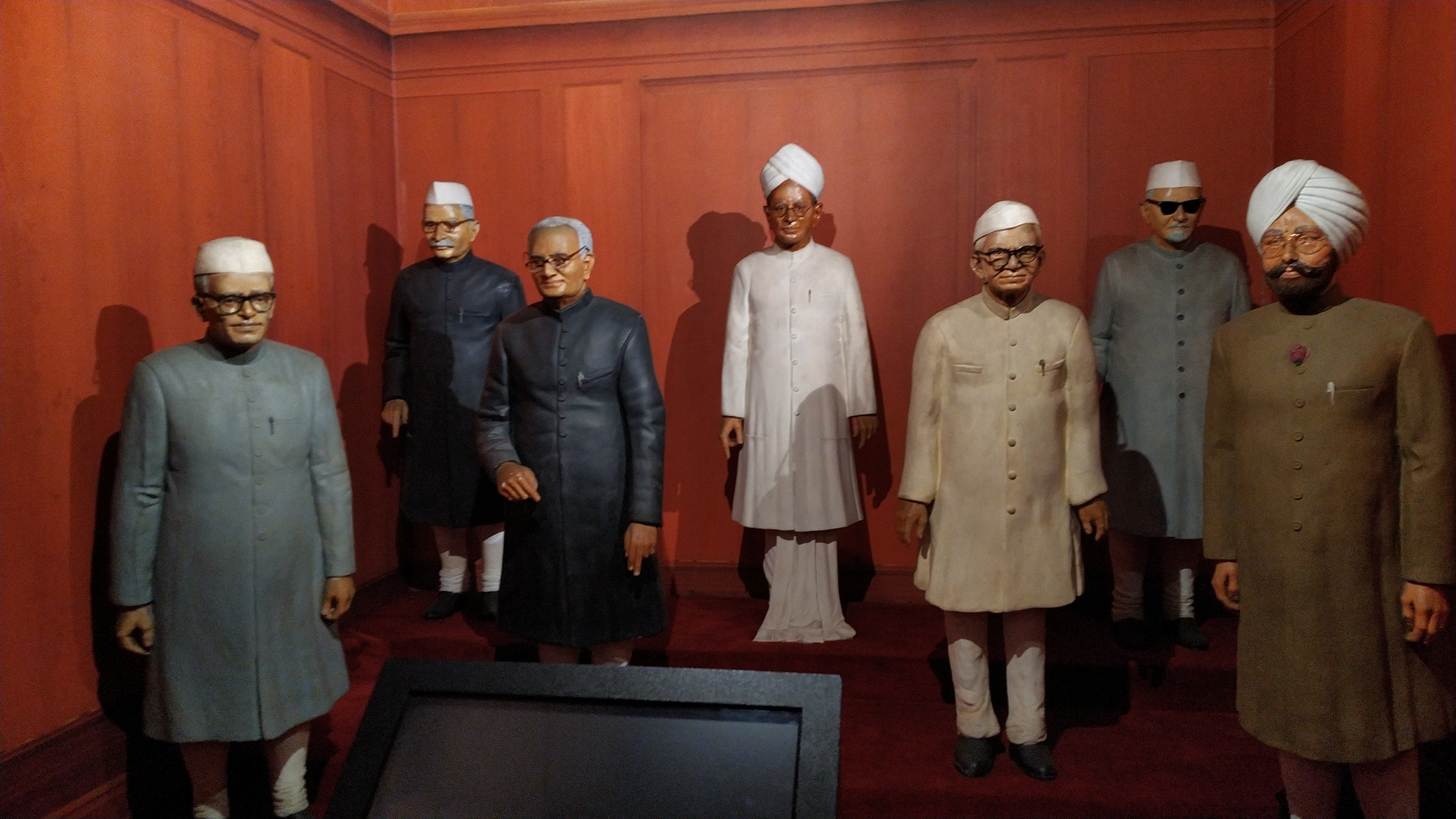
Fiberglass statues of the first seven Indian presidents (L-R: Neelam Sanjiva Reddy, Rajendra Prasad, V. V. Giri, Sarvepalli Radhakrishnan, Fakhruddin Ali Ahmed, Zakir Hussain, Zail Singh)

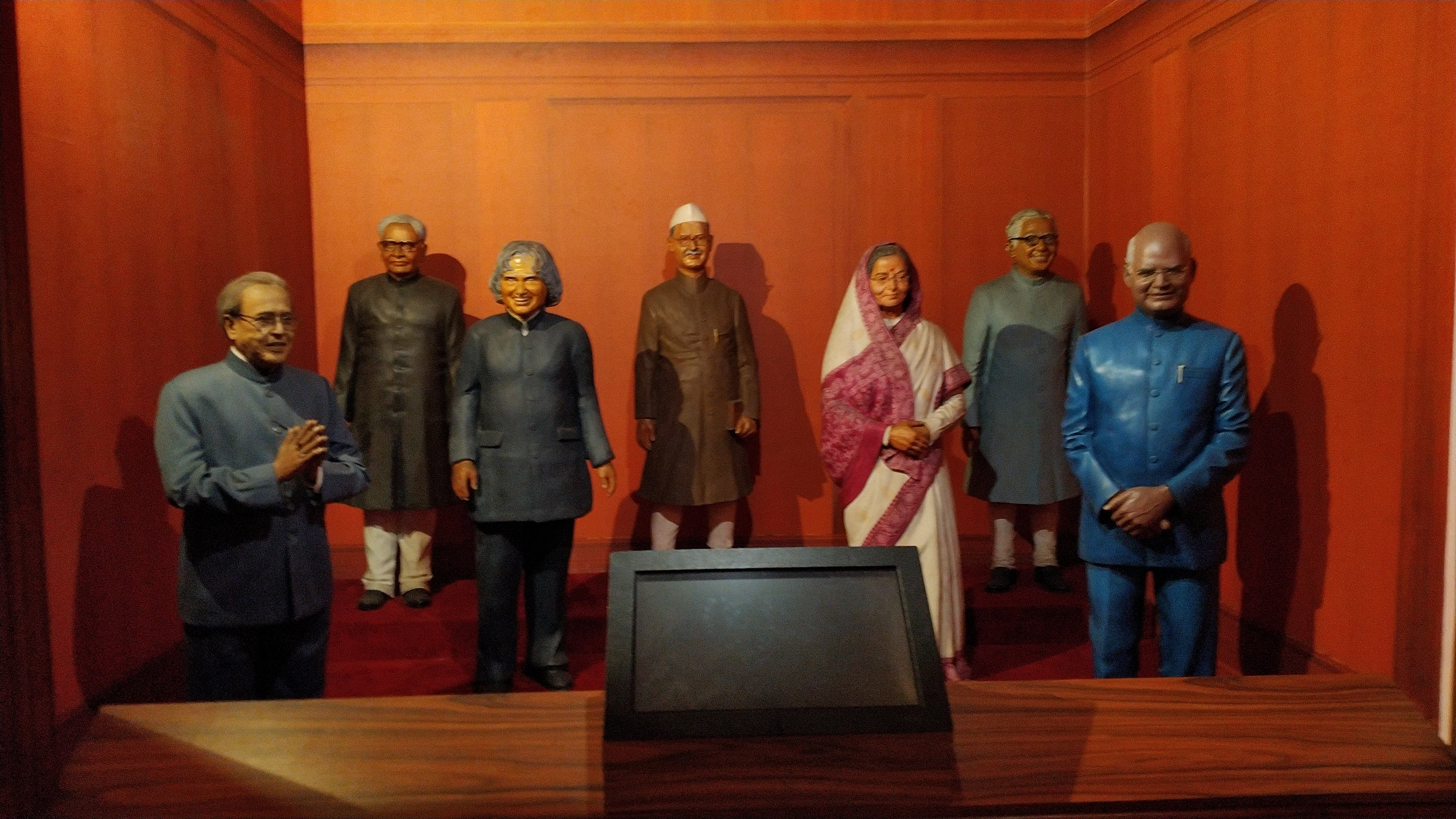
Fiberglass statues of the next seven Indian presidents (L-R: Pranab Mukherjee, R. Venkataraman, A. P. J. Abdul Kalam, Shankar Dayal Sharma, Pratibha Patil, K. R. Narayanan, Ram Nath Kovind)

== See also ==
- Pradhanmantri Sangrahalaya
- Rashtrapati Bhavan
- Presidency of Pranab Mukherjee
