= Rouble Nagi =

Indian Sculpture Artist

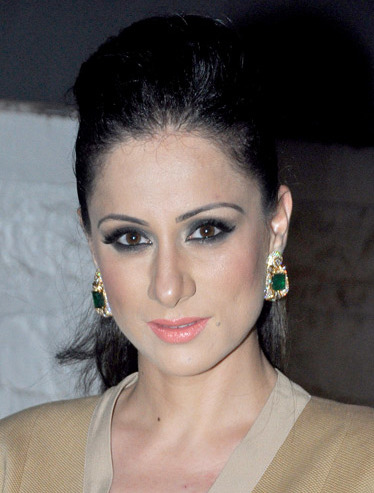
- Rouble Nagi in 2016
- Born: 8 July 1980 (age 46); Jammu & Kashmir, India
- Occupations: artist, sculptor, teacher
- Known for: Rouble Nagi Art Foundation
- Awards: Global Teacher Prize
- Website: http://roublenagi.com

Rouble Nagi (born 8 July 1980) is an Indian artist specialising in sculptures, art installations and paintings. She is the founder of Rouble Nagi Art Foundation. She is also the founder of Rouble Nagi Design Studio. She has over 800 murals to her credit and has held over 150 exhibitions. She won 2026 Global Teacher Prize, a Varkey Foundation initiative organised in collaboration with UNESCO, for her role in making learning accessible to the most marginalised communities.

She is a member of the India Design Council (IDC) and is one of the pioneer to start mumbai beautification. She has taken up an initiative to start Mumbai beautification with ‘Art Installations’ in and around the city. Her latest initiative named "Misaal Mumbai" is the first slum painting initiative in India, through which she has painted over 155000 houses to date. A project to transform houses in slums in Mumbai to give life to the slum and keep it clean and hygienic. Rouble Nagi was the first artist to be invited to exhibit at the Rashtrapati Bhavan Museum New Delhi in 2017 and her work was selected by honourable President of India to be put up at the museum.

She is the author of the book, The Slum Queen, which was released in 2022. It talks about her work in slums and villages in India. Empowering women in rural Kashmir through skill development and creating village entrepreneurs is something spectacular and one of a kind.

Nagi was born in 1980 in Jammu & Kashmir, India. She did undergraduate studies in political science and later studied fine art at the Slade School of Fine Art in London. She has also studied European Art at Sotheby's London.

== Rouble Nagi Art Foundation ==
Rouble Nagi Art Foundation is a mumbai based NGO, registered under the Bombay Public Trust Act,1950 founded by Rouble Nagi that runs Balwadis with art programs in Mumbai slums and across India to initiate children to come to school. The foundation aims to transform the community through art and education.

== Misaal Mumbai ==
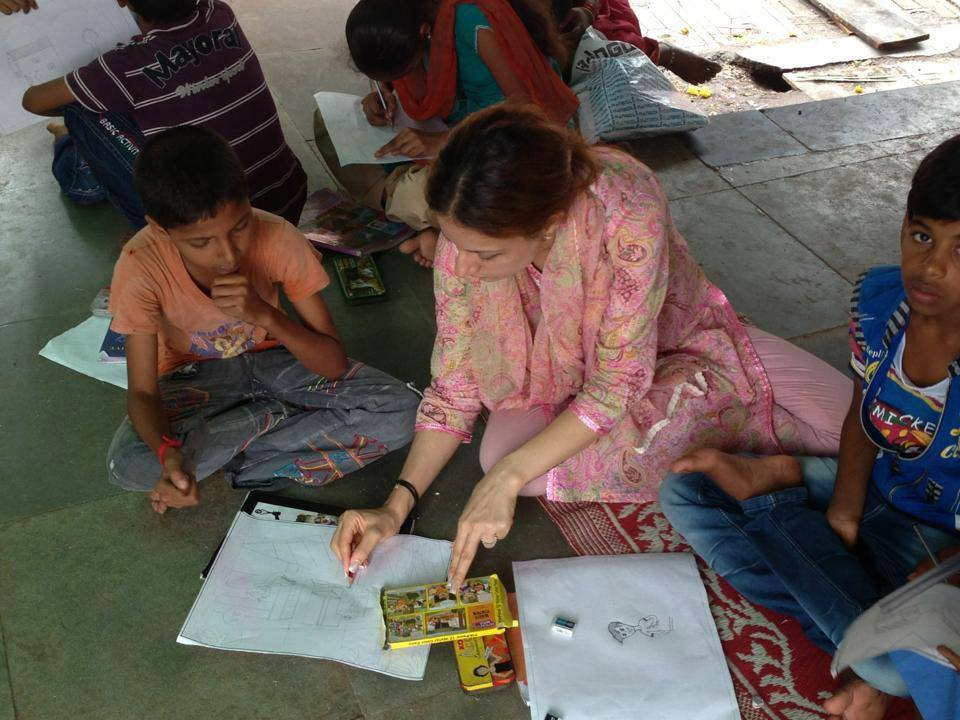
Nagi at a social event ien 2016.

Misaal Mumbai is another initiative of social activist Rouble Nagi. It all began with Paint Dharavi in 2016 and now extended to Bandra West along with several sites in Mumbai and other parts of Maharashtra. The project in Bandra West consisted of the painting of over 285 houses in Jaffar Baba Colony, Mount Mary, Bandra West. Rouble Nagi and her team along with help from locals and residents painted and cleaned the slums in these areas.
