= Hanan Al Hroub =

Palestinian teacher

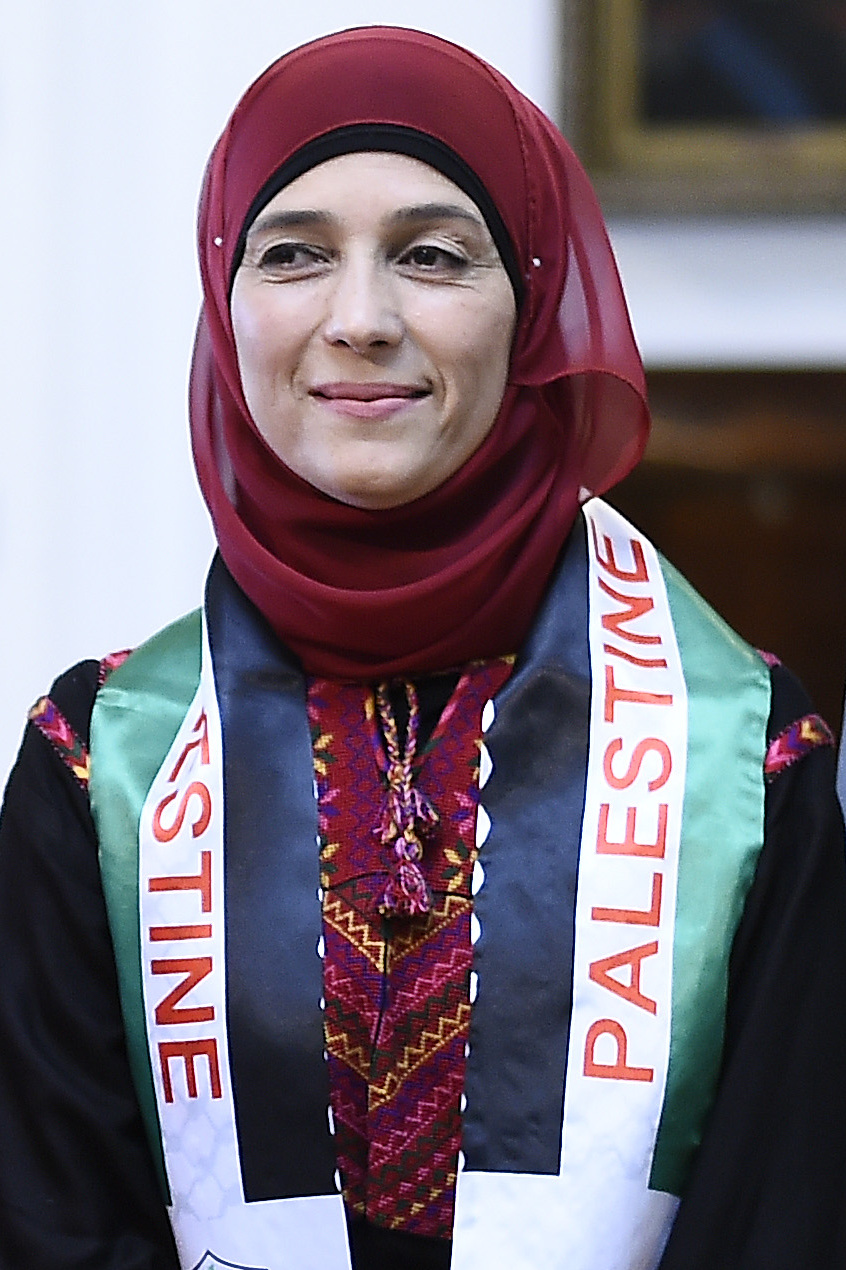
- Born: Bethlehem
- Citizenship: Palestinian
- Occupation: Teacher
- Awards: Global Teacher Prize (2016)
- Website: https://twitter.com/hanan_hroub

Hanan Al Hroub is a Palestinian teacher who in 2016 was the second winner of the Global Teacher Prize, which specialises in supporting children traumatised by violence.

== Career ==
She grew up in the Dheisheh Palestinian refugee camp near Bethlehem, where she experienced and saw violent acts, and her own children were traumatized by a shooting incident in which her husband was shot in his car on an Israeli army checkpoint. She was studying English at university and wanted to become a translator. She decided to work in education after her 9-year-old twins and her 6-year-old son were shot at by Israeli soldiers in October at the outset of the Al-Aqsa Intifada. She teaches Palestinian children in refugee camps, and her slogan is "No to Violence". She uses a specialised approach she developed herself, which uses play that is aimed at resolving violence and tension. The method is detailed in her book, We Play and Learn. She has said that when she started teaching, "the violence that kids were seeing in the streets, they were carrying into the classroom," but that after a few months, their behavior and attitude improved dramatically.

== Global Teacher Prize ==
In March 2016, Al Hroub was the second winner of the $1 million Global Teacher Prize. The Varkey Foundation's Global Education and Skills Forum presents the annual award, and Al Hroub's award was commemorated in a video message from Pope Francis. The winner in 2015 was American teacher Nancie Atwell.

== Family ==
She has 5 children.

Her husband, Omar, served 10 years in an Israeli prison after having been convicted as an accomplice in a deadly 1980 bullet and grenade attack in Hebron in which six Israelis died while walking home to Beit Hadassah, a building into which Jewish settlers had recently moved, from Friday night Sabbath prayers. Omar al-Hroub was convicted by an Israeli court of being the chemist who provided chemicals needed for making the grenades. On his release, Omar al-Hroub endorsed the 1993 Oslo interim peace accord with Israel and the Two-State Solution, and later served as a deputy Cabinet minister with the Palestinian Authority. The Varkey Foundation commented that "the judging process examines the qualities and achievements of the candidates themselves only."
