= Jennie Baptiste =

English photographer

- Born: September 1971 (age 54)
- Education: London College of Communication
- Years active: 1993–present
- Website: www.jenniebaptiste.com

Jennie Baptiste (born September 1971) is an English photographer. She is best known for documenting Black British youth and music culture, particularly in the 1990s and 2000s. Her series include Dancehall (1993), Black Chains of Icon (1994), Revolutions @ 33 1/3 rpm (1998), and Brixton Boyz (2001).

== Early life ==
Baptiste was born to Saint Lucian parents who had moved to London in the 1960s and grew up on the Church End Estate in Brent. She had an interest in photography and music culture at a young age, from collecting scrapbooks and spending her free time in the Oxford Street HMV. Baptiste attended Alperton Community School. She graduated from with a Bachelor of Arts (BA) in Photography from the London College of Communication in 1994. During her studies, she volunteered for the local Wembley and Brent Time.

== Career ==
Baptiste began her career in the early 1990s, starting with her long-running Dancehall series in 1993 charting the rise of London's dancehall and hip-hop scenes. She created her Black Chains of Icon series during her final year of university in 1994. She shot one of Wale Adeyemi's first photoshoots. This was followed by her series Revolutions @ 33 1/3 rpm (1998), which contains portraits of eleven London DJs and Brixton Boyz (1998), documenting youth culture on the streets of South London. Baptiste also captured various music artists, including Estelle, Ty, Roots Manuva, Nas, Mary J Blige and Ms Dynamite.

Baptiste's portrait of Roots Manuva was later added to the National Portrait Gallery's permanent collection in the 1990s room. Select pieces of Baptiste's featured in exhibitions at the V&A Museum, including Black British Style (2004), Staying Power (2015), Undressed: A Brief History of Underwear (2016) and Fashion & Masculinities: The Art of Menswear (2022), as well as The Music is Black (2026) at V&A East. Works of hers joined the V&A's collections and archives, including the photograph Sepia Butterfly in V&A's Theatre and Performance Collection.

In 2023, Baptiste's Pinky portrait featured in The Missing Thread exhibition at Somerset House. Baptiste's work featured in Joy Gregory's 2024 book Shining Lights: Black Women Photographers in 1980s–90s Britain. In 2025, Baptiste returned to Somerset House for her first major retrospective solo exhibition covering her body of work since the 1990s titled Jennie Baptiste: Rhythm & Roots, curated by Kinnari Saraiya.

== Artistry ==
Baptiste's photography influences include Albert Watson and James Van Der Zee.
