= Alperton =

Coordinates: 51.54°N 0.30°W

- Suburb
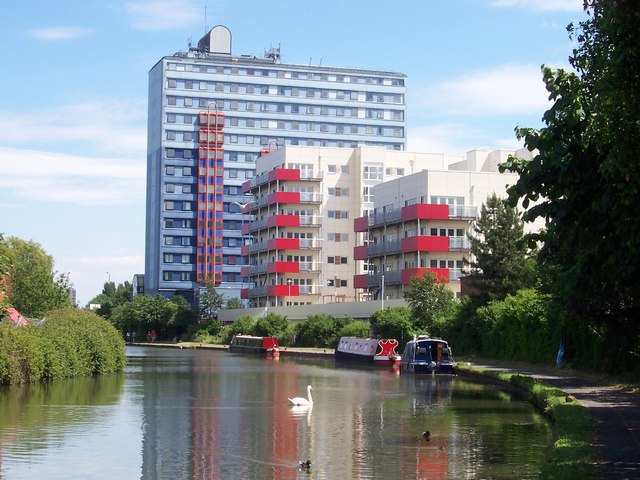
- Middlesex House and Grand Union Apartments on the Grand Union Canal

- Location within Greater London
- Population: 14,017 (2011 Census. Ward)
- OS grid reference: TQ185835
  - Charing Cross: 7.6 mi (12.2 km) ESE
- London borough: Brent
- Ceremonial county: Greater London
- Region: London
- Country: England
- Sovereign state: United Kingdom
- Post town: WEMBLEY
- Postcode district: HA0
- Dialling code: 020
- Police: Metropolitan
- Fire: London
- Ambulance: London
- UK Parliament: Brent West
- London Assembly: Brent and Harrow

Alperton (/ˈælpətən/) is an area of north-west London, England, within the London Borough of Brent. It forms the southern part of the town of Wembley and is 7.5 miles (12 km) west north-west of Charing Cross, on the border with the London Borough of Ealing. It includes a handful of high-rise and many mid-rise buildings as well as streets of low-rise houses with gardens. It adjoins the Grand Union Canal's Paddington Arm, which is fed by the Brent Reservoir.

== Toponymy ==
The name Alperton means "farmstead or estate associated with a man named Ealhbeorht", deriving from an Anglo-Saxon personal name and tūn, meaning farmstead or village in Old English.

== History ==
Alperton was originally a hamlet, first mentioned in 1199 as 'Alprinton'. Until the arrival of the canal and the railways, it was sparsely populated with a few farms around the main road. By 1848, it had a population of 242, and was part of the parish of Harrow-on-the-Hill. Its population continued to grow, rising to 14,432 in 1951.

The parish of St James, Alperton, was established in 1904, with a church built in Stanley Avenue in 1912.

== Demography ==
Religion in Alperton(2021 census)
1. Hinduism (44.7%)
2. Christianity (25.1%)
3. Islam (13.9%)
4. No Religion (7.69%)
5. Not Stated (5.31%)
6. Sikhism (0.59%)
7. Other (1.25%)
8. Buddhism (1.45%)
9. Judaism (0.05%)

Alperton has one of the capital's highest populations of black or minority ethnic groups (BME). In the 1991 census, 43.2% of Alperton ward's population was Asian, only one point less than White. British Indians formed 31.5% in 1991 and 32.4% in 2001, with white having decreased to 27.8%. According to the 2011 census, the largest ethnic group was Indian, 42% of the population, well above Brent's average of 18%. Other Asian was second largest at 17%. The most spoken foreign language was Gujarati, by 3,213 residents, followed by Tamil, spoken by 1,001 residents. In the 2011 census 47.7% of residents are of the Hindu faith, Christians: 27.2% and Muslims: 11.9%.

== Transport ==
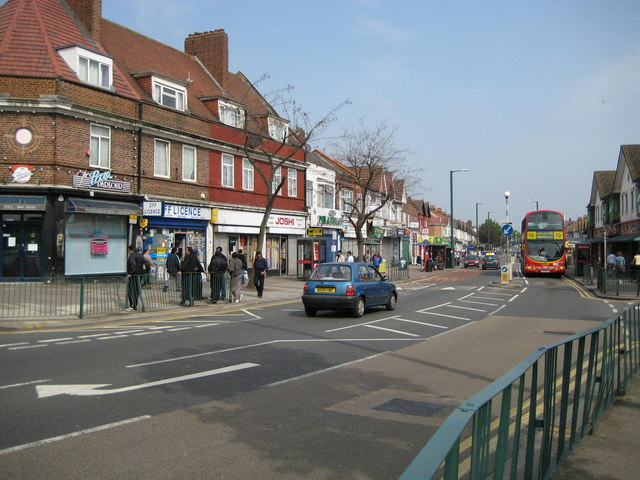
Ealing Road, the main commercial road of Alperton

The Grand Union Canal runs through Alperton and its towpath is part of the Grand Union Canal Walk.

=== Trains ===
Alperton has its own tube station of the same name, served by the Piccadilly line and located in the district. Other close stations include Hanger Lane tube station (Central line) to the south; Stonebridge Park station (Bakerloo line and Lioness line) to the east; and Wembley Central station (Bakerloo line, Lioness line, Southern & West Midlands Trains) to the north.

== Notable people ==
- Chess endgame study composer and author John Roycroft was born in Alperton
- Gary Waddock, former footballer and manager of Aldershot Town 2007–2009, grew up in Alperton
- Footballer Joe Wiggins (1909–82) was born in Alperton

== In popular culture ==
The towpath of the Grand Union Canal in Alperton is featured in various scenes in the BBC TV soap EastEnders. It first appeared in an episode which aired on 3 October 1985, when the character Den Watts (played by Leslie Grantham) meets Michelle Fowler (played by Susan Tully) and it is revealed Den is the father of Michelle's baby. It was used again on numerous occasions, most famously on 23 February 1989, when Den Watts was shot before falling into the canal and supposedly dying. Den returned to the canal with daughter Sharon Watts on 3 October 2003, when he returned to Albert Square alive.

== Schools ==
Alperton Community School: The school is divided into two sites: the lower school on Ealing Road near Alperton tube station, consisting of Years 7, 8 and 9 and the upper school on Stanley Avenue, consisting of Years 10, 11, 12 and 13. The lower school was renovated in 2017.
