= Peter Tabichi =

Kenyan teacher and Franciscan friar (born 1982)

Peter Tabichi OFM
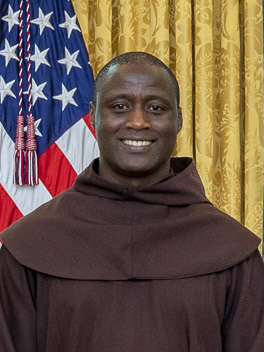
- Tabichi in 2019
- Born: Peter Mokaya Tabichi; 1982 (age 43–44); Nyamira County, Kenya
- Education: Egerton University
- Occupation: Teacher
- Parent: Lawrence Tabichi
- Awards: Global Teacher Prize (2019)

Peter Mokaya Tabichi OFM (born 1982) is a Kenyan science teacher and Franciscan friar who teaches at Keriko Mixed Day Secondary School in Pwani, Nakuru County. He is the winner of the 2019 Global Teacher Prize. Tabichi was listed as one of the top 100 most influential Africans by New African in 2019.

== Early life and education ==
Tabichi was born in rural Kenya. He said he was inspired to become a teacher because of his family, "I admired the impact they had in the society, and wanted to better their script". He started his teaching career in a private school.

== Career ==
Tabichi is a Franciscan friar. He joined the Keriko Mixed Day Secondary School in 2016, where he teaches maths and physics. The school is located in a semi-arid village in the Rift Valley Province, a region impacted by famine and drought. Tabichi donates 80% of his salary to supporting pupils in the Pwani Village. The school population is made up of seven different tribes, with around 95% of students living in poverty and one third live with only one parent. Keriko Mixed Day Secondary School only has one computer, intermittent access to the internet and a student-teacher ratio of 58:1. Tabichi launched the Talent Nurturing Club, which has dramatically improved attendance. He also established a peace club, uniting representatives who have been involved with violence. He engages with local communities; teaching residents how to grow crops that can resist famine. Tabichi and his students work on renewable energy and devices which can support people with disabilities. Under Tabichi's influence, his students have reached the finals of the Intel International Science and Engineering Fair and won an award from the Royal Society of Chemistry. In only a couple of years, Tabichi has doubled the number of students attending university.

In 2019 Tabichi was awarded the $1 million Global Teacher Prize. The award receives over 10,000 nominations. Tabichi travelled on an aeroplane for the first time to collect the prize in Dubai. He was presented the prize by Hugh Jackman, and congratulated by Uhuru Kenyatta:

"Peter – your story is the story of Africa; a young continent bursting with talent. Your students have shown that they can compete amongst the best in the world in science, technology and all fields of human endeavour.”

On winning the prize, Tabichi said;

"Africa will produce scientists, engineers, entrepreneurs whose names will be one day famous in every corner of the world. And girls will be a huge part of this story."

In April 2019, Tabichi was appointed as Champion for Children in Conflicts and Crisis.
