= Ranjitsinh Disale =

Indian teacher

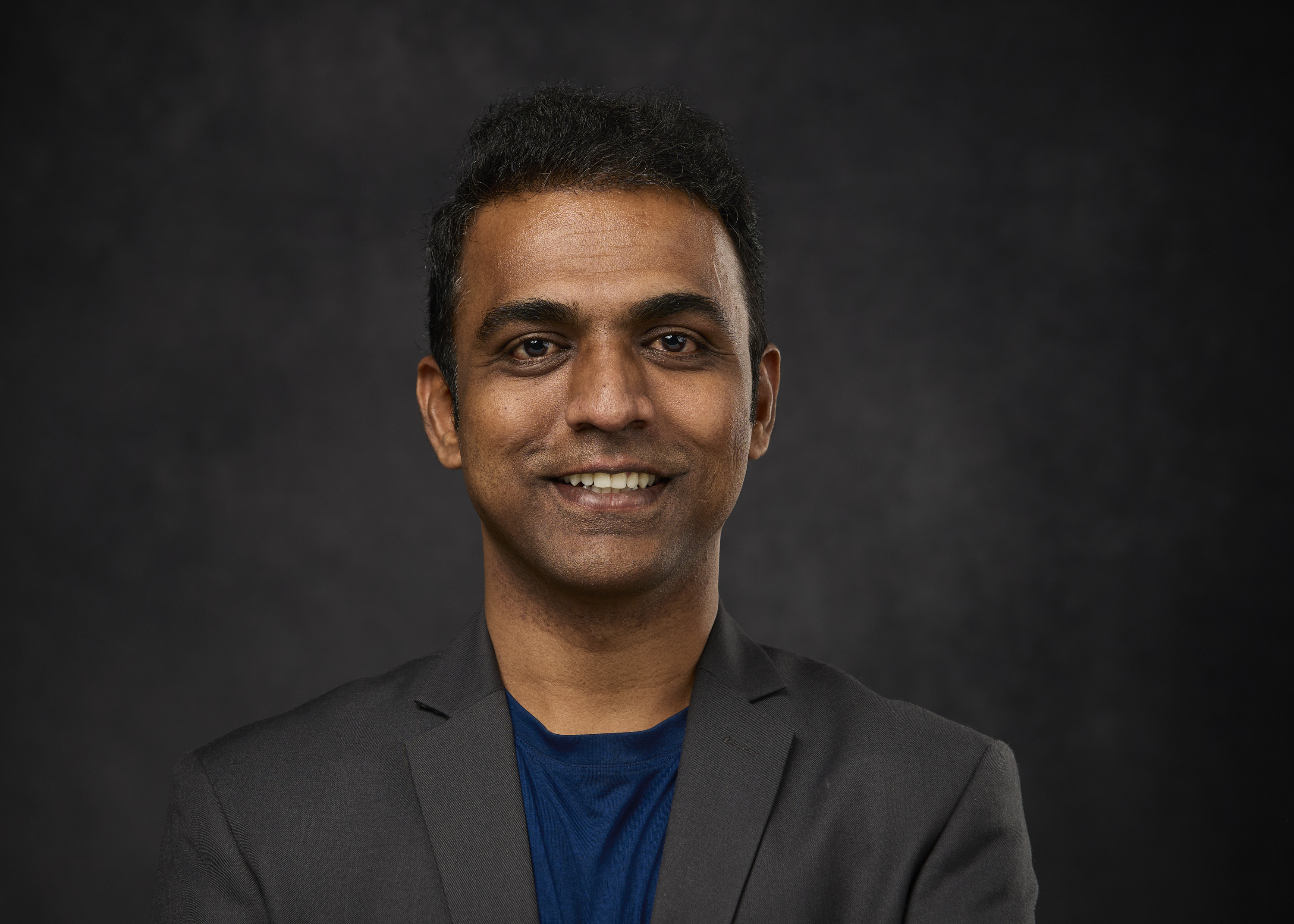
- Born: Paritewadi, Maharashtra
- Occupation: Teacher
- Known for: Global Teacher Prize
- Awards: Global Teacher Prize, Innovative Researcher of the Year (2016)

Ranjitsinh Disale is an Indian teacher from Maharashtra. He is the winner of $1 million annual Global Teacher Prize 2020 which was announced on 3 December 2020. The Global Teacher Prize, which has been referred to by journalists as the Nobel Prize for teaching, highlights and celebrates the profession while giving greater recognition to the work of teachers all over the world. Disale said in his winning speech that he would share with his nine fellow finalists half of the prize money, meaning they would receive $55,000 each. He also works with the World Bank as Advisor for their educational programs. He was selected by the US Government to join Fulbright Program.

== Early life and education ==
Disale hails from Paritewadi Village in the Solapur District of Maharashtra. At the beginning, he decided to be an IT engineer and had enrolled in an engineering college. But when things didn't fit for him, his father convinced him to take up the teacher's training programme. While Disale was initially reluctant about the decision, his time at the college of teacher training made him realize that the real change-makers in the world are the teachers.

== Career ==
Disale is well known for his innovative teaching works, including demonstrating scientific experiments from the science lab built by him and adding QR codes to primary category books so that his students can get links to audio poems, video lectures, assignments and stories. Today, his efforts have led to 100 per cent attendance, especially of girls, at the Paritewadi school he teaches.

His practice of embedding QR codes in textbooks helped 300 schools adapt the same. He has also set up Rs 1 lakh scholarships for the education of 10 girls. His idea of incorporating QR codes into textbooks was adopted by National Council of Educational Research and Training.

In his village, he also campaigned to eliminate adolescent marriages and encourage the education of girls.

He submitted his resignation letter in July 2022 to join the Fulbright Program in USA. The Education Ministry approved study leave and allowed him to participate in the program without resignation. Maharashtra Chief Minister Eknath Shinde and Deputy Minister Devendra Fadnavis assured him that the Maharashtra government will support him.

== Awards ==
Year	Title	Result	Presented by	Ref.
2016	Innovative Researcher of the Year	Won	Government of India	
2020	Global Teacher Prize	Won	Varkey Foundation	
