= Church End, Brent =

Locality in London, England

Coordinates: 51.546°N 0.251°W

Church End
- Location within Greater London
- OS grid reference: TQ212845
- London borough: Brent
- Ceremonial county: Greater London
- Region: London
- Country: England
- Sovereign state: United Kingdom
- Post town: LONDON
- Postcode district: NW10
- Dialling code: 020
- Police: Metropolitan
- Fire: London
- Ambulance: London
- London Assembly: Brent and Harrow

Church End, known locally as "Church Road", is a small locality in the London Borough of Brent, north of Harlesden, west of Willesden and south of Neasden. Its population is historically predominantly Afro-Caribbean with a large East African community.

The street Church Road is the main thoroughfare of the neighbourhood, which also includes a short crescent at the north end, just off Willesden Magistrates Court. To the west, the Dudding Hill Line and Taylors Lane Power Station separates it from Brentfield Road in Stonebridge. The nearest train station at its north end is Neasden and at its south end is Harlesden. Bus routes 260 and 266 serve Church Road, with 297 at the north end and 18/N18 at the south end.

== Church End Estate ==
Church End is a deprived community with a large Caribbean and Somali population. Hassan Farah was credited with getting four local British Somali youngsters from the Queen's Road Community School to Oxbridge. The 2020 COVID-19 pandemic has had a serious effect on this community. At least 10 residents died, making this cluster the second worst in London. Many of the victims have been men, like Farah in their 40s and 50s- whole families have been impacted. Brent has the highest age-standardised coronavirus death rate in the country, excess deaths being three times the national average.

== History ==
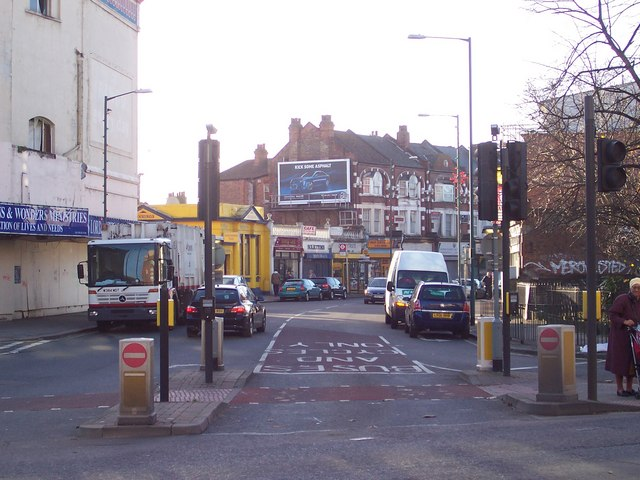
Northern end of Church Road, close to the St Mary's Church it takes its name from

Church End arose as the area around St. Mary's Church near Willesden. It was known as "the Churchend" in the late 16th century. During the 18th century, a village and inns developed around the church. The arrival of the railways in the 19th century lead to further development, though the area remained agricultural to begin with. An 1876 book noted "There are a few houses about the ch., at what is called Church End" and recorded there being two inns, the White Horse and the White Hart. Industry and "poor housing" grew the area to be contiguous with Harlesden, though Roundwood Park was still green space. By the 20th century it was one of the poorest parts of London and from the 1960s was known for high rates of unemployment. Road widening and building in the 1960s changed the character of the area.

The council transferred Church End Estate and Roundwood Estate to Fortunegate in 1998 in a regeneration scheme. A regeneration plan for the Church End Neighbourhood Centre was approved by the council cabinet in 2016.

== Crime ==
Church End Estate, along with Roundwood Estate and some of Harlesden, is associated with the Church Road Soldiers street gang. Gang violence led to the fatal shootings in Church End in 2016 of two men in their twenties who were uninvolved in gangs, Oliver Tetlow and James Owusu-Ajyekum.

== Notable residents ==
- Jennie Baptiste
- Nines
- Ice City Boyz

== See also ==
- Roundwood Park
