= Ray BLK =

British singer (born 1994)

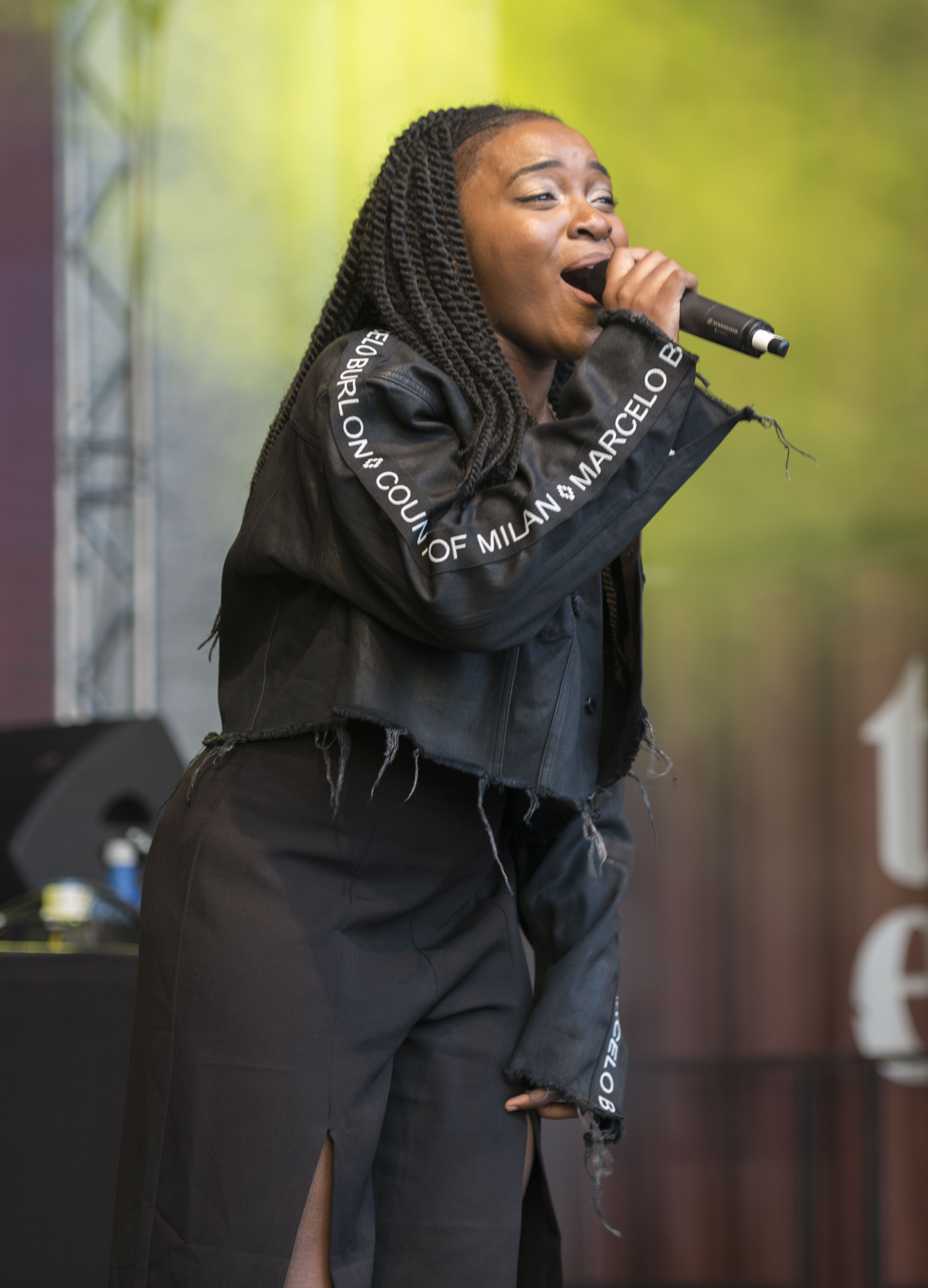

Background information
- Also known as: Ray Blizzy
- Born: Rita Ekwere; 2 August 1994 (age 31); Nigeria
- Origin: Catford, South East London, England
- Genres: R&B; soul; neo soul
- Occupations: Singer; songwriter; rapper
- Years active: 2015–present
- Label: Universal Island Records

Rita Ekwere (born 2 August 1994), better known under her stage name of Ray BLK (pronounced "Ray Black"), is a British singer and songwriter who was born in Nigeria, and grew up in Catford in London. She won the BBC's Sound of 2017, and was the first unsigned artist to do so. On 28 October 2016, she released her debut mini-album, Durt, and in January 2018 signed to the UK branch of Island Records. Her debut full-length studio album, Access Denied, was released to critical acclaim in October 2021.

== Background ==
Ray BLK, whose real name is Rita Ekwere, was born in Nigeria and moved to London when she was about four. She grew up in Catford. At the age of 13 she formed a music group with her school friend MNEK called "New Found Content". She studied for a degree in English literature at Brunel University, and her dissertation was on post-colonial Nigerian literature, focusing on the novels of Chinua Achebe and Chimamanda Adichie. She worked in an advertising agency to sustain her music career in its early days.

Her stage surname BLK stands for Building Living Knowing, which she describes as her three main values.

== Career ==
Ray released her first recordings while studying for her English degree. Her debut EP Havisham was released in 2015. Inspired by Miss Havisham's story in Charles Dickens' novel Great Expectations, it told the tale of a girl who turns against men after having her heartbroken. According to Ray: "I felt like Miss Havisham was like a lot of women around me, who got their heartbroken and turned cold and began to hate men." Ray releases music on her own label and has avoided signing a record deal to retain the rights to her music. In 2016, she self-released her debut mini-album Durt, featuring collaborations with Stormzy, Wretch 32 and SG Lewis. Her single "My Hood" is a song about her home town of Catford. She wrote it at a time when she had just been robbed, and she felt like she just wanted to leave.

She was nominated for best newcomer at the 2016 MOBO Awards. On 6 January 2017, Ray was announced as the winner of the BBC's Sound of 2017.

In 2019, Ray BLK was the opening act for the UK leg of The Nicki Wrld Tour, the headlining tour by American rapper Nicki Minaj.

In November 2019, she released a song called "Action" with rapper Chip, then went on to teasing more music with 3 snippets on Instagram from her upcoming debut album which will be released in 2021.

In July 2021, she released a single "MIA" featuring American singer Kaash Paige and announced that her debut album Access Denied would be released on 17 September 2021 through Island Records, later delayed to 1 October. Upon release the album attracted critical acclaim and was listed as one of the best albums of 2021 by NME.

In 2023, she made her acting debut as Honey on the BBC One musical drama series Champion. She also served as music executive on the soundtrack alongside Ghetts and the show's creator and writer Candice Carty-Williams.

== Discography ==
=== Studio albums ===
Title	Details
Access Denied	Released: 1 October 2021; Label: Island Records; Format: Digital download

=== EPs ===
Title	Details
Durt	Released: 28 October 2016; Label: Self-released; Format: Digital download
Empress	Released: 26 October 2018; Label: Island Records; Format: Digital download
A Forest Fire	Released: 25 October 2024; Label: Self-released; Format: Digital download

=== Mixtapes ===
Title	Details
Havisham	Released: 15 March 2015; Label: Self-released; Format: Digital download

=== Singles ===
==== As a lead artist ====
Title	Year	Album
"5050"	2015	Durt
"My Hood" (featuring Stormzy)	2016	Durt
"Chill Out" (featuring SG Lewis)	2016	Durt
"Patience (Freestyle)"	2017	Non-album singles
"Doing Me"	2017	Non-album singles
"All Or Nothing" (with Naughty Boy & Wyclef Jean)	2018	Bungee Jumping
"Baby" (with Yogi & Maleek Berry featuring Kid Ink)	2018	Non-album single
"Run Run"	2018	Empress
"Empress"	2018	Empress
"In My Bed"	2019	Non-album singles
"Action" (featuring Chip)	2019	Non-album singles
"Lovesick"	2020	Access Denied
"Games" (featuring Giggs)	2021	Access Denied
"Dark Skinned"	2021	Access Denied
"MIA" (featuring Kaash Paige)	2021	Access Denied
"Mine"	2021	Access Denied
"Over You" (featuring Stefflon Don)	2021	Access Denied
"Sunshine"	2024	A Forest Fire

==== As a featured artist ====
Title	Year	Album
"The Apprentice" (Gorillaz featuring Rag'n'Bone Man, Zebra Katz & Ray BLK)	2017	Humanz
"Flat Champagne" (Dan Caplen featuring Ray BLK)	2017	Flat Champagne – EP
"Scared of Love" (Rudimental featuring Ray BLK & Stefflon Don)	2019	Toast to Our Differences
"Daily Duppy (Relate)" (Big Tobz featuring Ray BLK)	2020	Issa Vibe
"Need You Tonight" (JP Cooper featuring Ray BLK)	2022	She

==== Promotional singles ====
Title	Year	Album
"Mama"	2018	Empress
"LOVE."	2018	Non-album single
"Paradise"	2019	Empress

=== Other charted songs ===
Title	Year	Peak chart positions	Album
Title	Year	UK	Album
"Rubber Bands" (with Nines & Skrapz)	2018	61	Crop Circle

=== Guest appearances ===
Title	Year	Artist(s)	Album	Credits
"Beautiful Day to Die"	2015	TE dness	April Showers 2	Featured artist
"Love's Intervention"	2016	Kojey Radical	23Winters	Featured artist
"2Am"	2016	Courage	Get Some Courage, Vol. 1	Featured artist
"Busy"	2017	NEW GEN	New Gen	Featured artist
"Not for The Radio"	2017	Tinie Tempah, MNEK	Youth	Background vocalist
"Rubber Bands"	2018	Nines, Scrapz	Crop Circle	Featured artist
"Crew"	2018	Raye, Kojo Funds	Side Tape	Featured artist
"Skr on Em"	2020	Dutchavelli	Dutch from the 5th	Featured artist
