= Lissie Saggiak =

Inuk artist

- Born: 1924; Salluit, Quebec
- Died: 1989 (aged 64–65)

Lissie Saggiak, also known as Lizzie Saggiak, (1924-1989) was an Inuk artist. Saggiak was born in Salluit, Quebec. She is known for her drawings and sculptures.

Her work is included in the collections of the National Gallery of Canada, the Winnipeg Art Gallery and the McMichael Canadian Art Collection.
