= Streetz =

Streetz may refer to:

- Streetz, a member of the hip hop collective Ice City Boyz
- W233BF, a translator licensed to Atlanta, Georgia and known as Streetz 94.5
- W258CB, a translator licensed to Greenville, South Carolina once known as Streetz 99.5
- WGIV, a radio station licensed to Pineville, North Carolina, known as Streetz 103.3
