= Presidency of Pranab Mukherjee =

Indian presidential administration from 2012to 2017

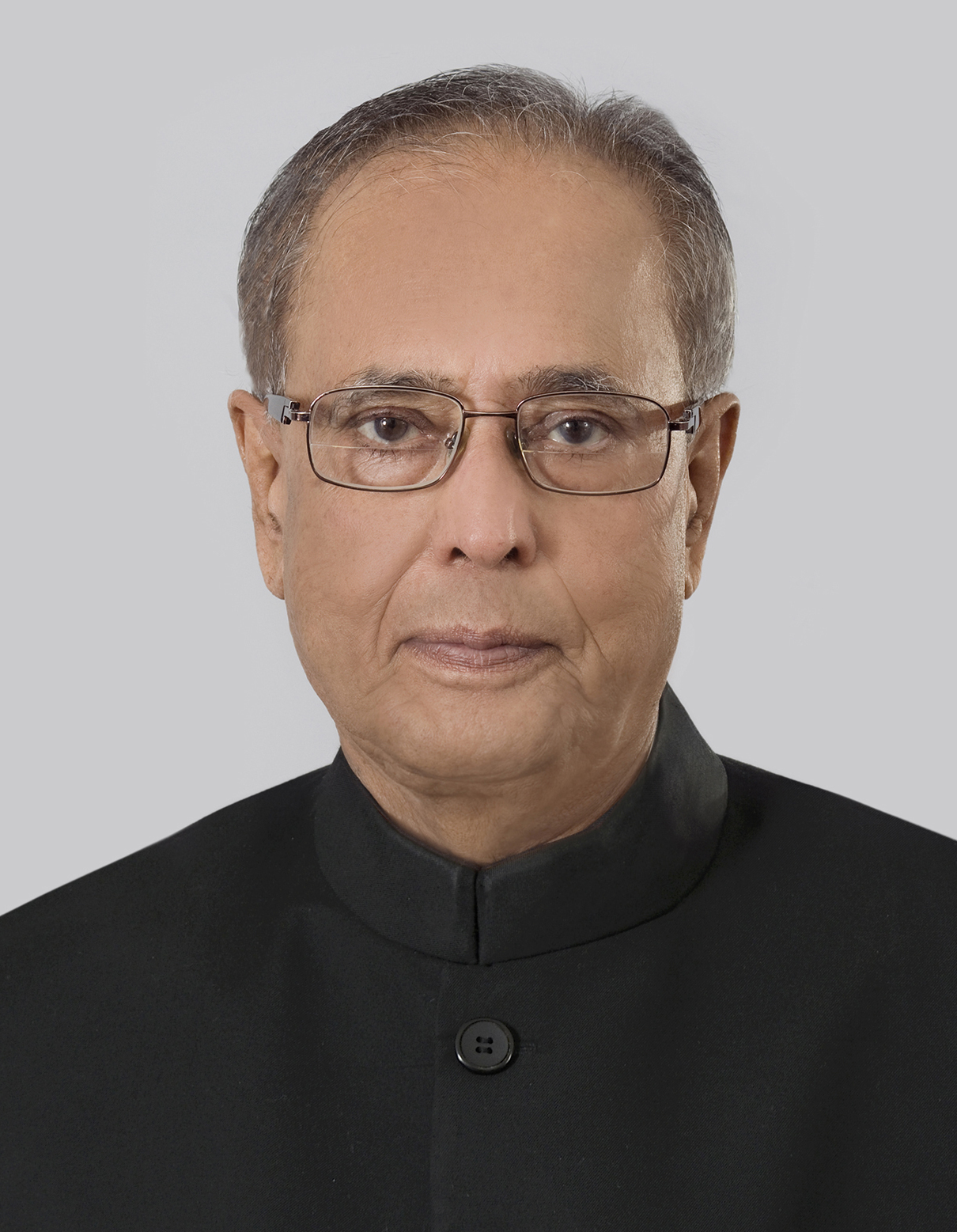
- Official portrait, 2012
- Presidency of Pranab Mukherjee; 25 July 2012 – 25 July 2017
- President: Pranab Mukherjee
- Party: Indian National Congress
- Election: 2012 Indian presidential election
- Seat: Rashtrapati Bhawan
- Emblem of India

The Presidency of Pranab Mukherjee begins on 25 July 2012, when he took oath as the thirteenth President of India.

== Domestic affairs ==
=== Mercy petitions ===
During his tenure, Mukherjee disposed of 34 mercy pleas. Of these, 30 were rejected and 4 were commuted. Among those whose pleas were denied are Ajmal Kasab, Afzal Guru and Yakub Menon.

== Foreign affairs ==
=== List of state visits ===
Official state visits by President Pranab Mukherjee
#	Year	Country	Date(s)	Notes	Image
1	2013	Bangladesh	3–5 March	Awarded Bangladesh Liberation War Honour	
2	2013	Mauritius	11–13 March	Chief guest at National Day; multiple MoUs signed	
3	2013	Belgium	2–5 October	First presidential visit; cultural diplomacy, "Europalia‑India"	
3	2013	Turkey	5–8 October	Focus on Afghan and Central Asia cooperation	
4	2014	Vietnam	14–17 September	Planted Bodhi tree; strengthened cultural ties	
5	2014	Norway	13–14 October		
5	2014	Finland	14–16 October		
6	2014	Bhutan	7–8 November		
7	2015	Russia	7–11 May		
8	2015	Sweden	31 May–2 June		
8	2015	Belarus	2–4 June		
9	2015	Jordan	10–12 October		
9	2015	Palestine	12–13 October		
9	2015	Israel	13–15 October		
10	2016	Papua New Guinea	28–29 April		
10	2016	New Zealand	30 April–2 May		
11	2016	China	24–27 May		
12	2016	Ghana	12–14 June		
12	2016	Ivory Coast	14–15 June	Awarded Grand Cross of the National Order of the Ivory Coast	
12	2016	Namibia	15–17 June		
13	2016	Nepal	2–4 November		

=== State visits ===
==== Belgium and Turkey ====
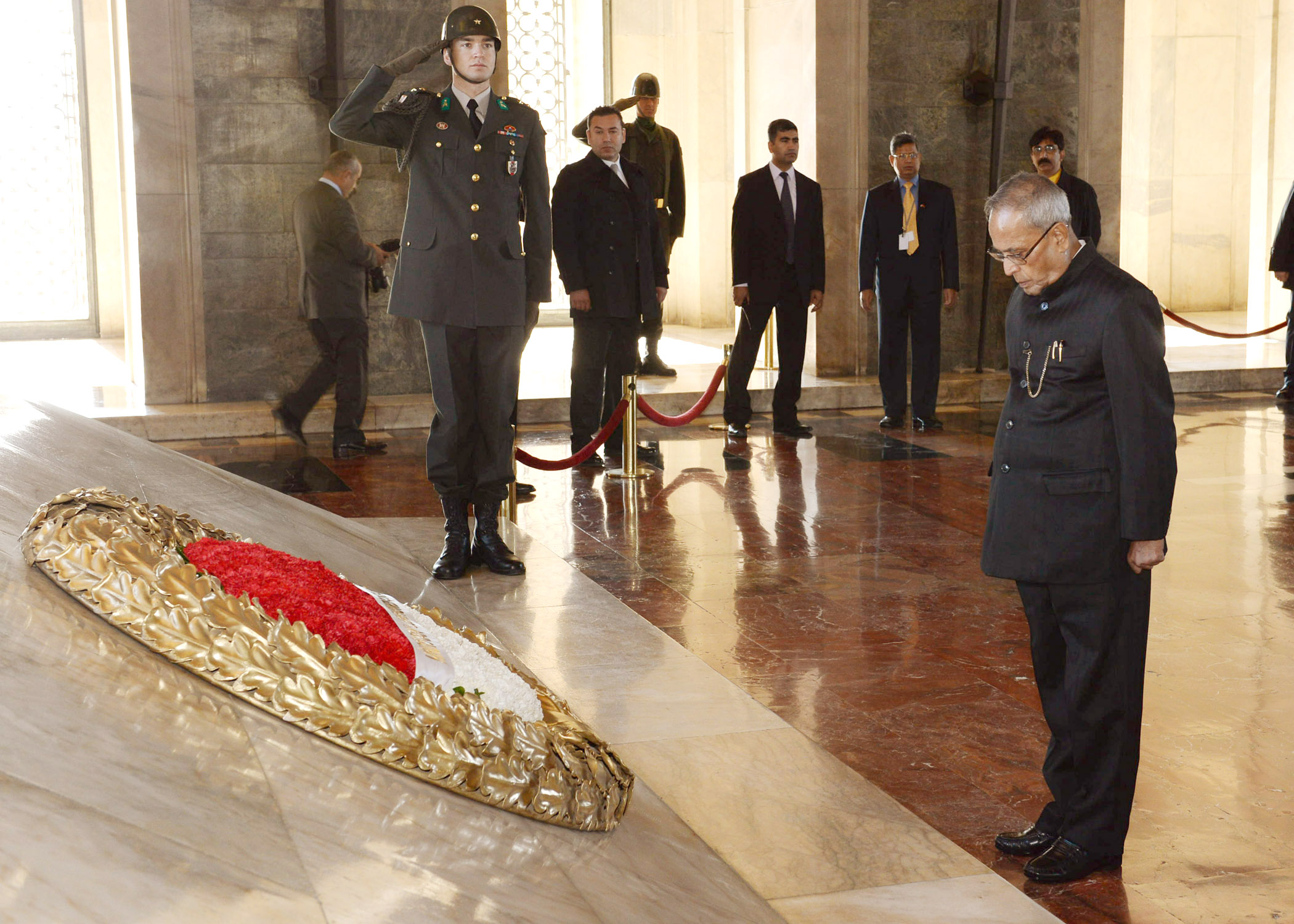
The President, Shri Pranab Mukherjee laid wreath at the Mausoleum of Mustafa Kemal Ataturk, at Ankara, Turkey on 7 October 2013

The President, accompanied with his daughter Sharmistha Mukherjee, arrived at Brussels.

==== Vietnam ====
President Mukherjee planted a Bodhi tree in the Presidential Palace.

==== Jordan, Palestine, and Israel ====
He was conferred with an honorary doctorate by the University of Jordan.

He addressed the Israeli parliament
