= Global Teacher Prize =

- Awarded for: teacher who has had an inspiring impact on his students and in his community.
- Location: United Kingdom; 2nd Floor, St Albans House 57-59 Haymarket London, SW1Y 4QX
- Country: United Kingdom
- Presented by: Varkey Foundation
- Reward: Prize money of $1 million
- First award: 2015; 11 years ago
- Website: www.globalteacherprize.org

The Global Teacher Prize is an annual US$1 million award by the Varkey Foundation to a teacher who has made an outstanding contribution to the profession. Nominations of teachers who meet specific criteria are open to the worldwide public, and teachers can also nominate themselves. The judging is done by the Global Teacher Prize Academy, consisting of head teachers, education experts, commentators, journalists, public officials, tech entrepreneurs, company directors, and scientists from around the world.

The annual prize was launched at the second annual Global Education and Skills Forum in March 2014 and received over 5,000 nominations from 127 countries.

The Global Teacher Prize, which has been referred to by journalists as the Nobel Prize for teaching, highlights and celebrates the profession while giving greater recognition to the work of teachers all over the world The head of the Varkey Foundation has asserted that, "We want to promote teachers as stars and to support the quality of education to highlight the enormous impact teachers have on our lives"; "Teaching needs to be the most important profession in the world and they've got to be given their due respect."

Since 2018, Portugal has the 'Global Teacher Prize Portugal', which is an annual 30,000 EUR award by the Varkey Foundation as well, sponsored by Delta Cafe, partnered with Fundação Galp, Federação Portuguesa de Futebol, and audited by PWC.

== History ==
The first annual Global Teacher Prize was awarded in March 2015 to Nancie Atwell, an innovative and pioneering English teacher and teacher trainer in rural Maine in the United States, who founded and runs a school where students read an average of 40 books a year, choose which books they read, and write prolifically. Atwell has authored nine books on teaching, including one which has sold more than half a million copies. She donated her $1 million prize to the upkeep, development, and scholarships of her school, the nonprofit Center for Teaching and Learning, which is also a demonstration school for developing and disseminating teaching methods.

== Awarded ==
Year	Image	Name	Country	Occupation
2015		Nancie Atwell	United States	English teacher and teacher trainer.
2016		Hanan Al Hroub	Palestine	Palestinian teacher.
2017		Maggie MacDonnell	Canada	Inuit teacher.
2018		Andria Zafirakou	United Kingdom	Arts and textiles teacher.
2019		Peter Tabichi	Kenya	Science teacher.
2020		Ranjitsinh Disale	India	Indian teacher.
2021		Keishia Thorpe	United States	English teacher.
2023		Sister Zeph	Pakistan	Pakistani Christian teacher.
2025		Mansour Al Mansour	Saudi Arabia	Saudi Teacher.
2026		Rouble Nagi	India	Indian Teacher
