= Ice City Boyz =

British hip hop collective from Church End, London

Background information
- Origin: Church End, London, England
- Genres: British hip hop; road rap; UK drill
- Years active: 2012–now
- Label: Zino Records
- Members: See list

Ice City Boyz, often abbreviated as ICB, also known as CSB (Crime Scene Boyz) and CRS (Church Road Soldiers), is a British hip hop collective from Church End, London.

== History ==
The rap collective has been around since the early 2000s and started making music towards the start of the decade. Most members of the group come from the Church End Estate. The most successful artist from the group is Nines. Other artists in the group include Likkle T, Skrapz, J Styles, Fatz, Big Keyz, Streetz and others.

Trapster Toxic released the single "Life I Live" in November 2015. J Stylez, Fatz and Streetz released the single "Statement" in April 2017.

== Members ==
The list below includes confirmed members of Ice City Boyz

- BG
- Baloo
- Big Keyz
- Ca$h Mon£y
- Chappo
- Conna "Three Chainz" Haines
- Cuzn Sugz
- El Mino
- Fatz
- Flyboy Tuff
- Fundz
- Inchez
- Jambo
- J Man
- J Styles
- Jazzy
- Jay Midge
- Launcha
- Likkle T
- M.L.F
- Nines
- P Dubbz
- Q2T
- S Dot B Lee
- Sav
- Screama
- Skates
- Skrapz
- Storm Millian
- Streetz
- Stutta
- Tops
- Trapstar Toxic
- Babyface

== Former members ==
- Zino (†) (deceased in April 2008)
- Dundi (Dropped in 2015)
- Shotgun (had a fallout)

== Legal issues ==
=== Jazzy and Skrapz jailed ===
In January 2024, Jazzy from Crime Scene Boyz was found guilty of murdering a rival gang member, Craig Small, alongside that an attempted murder, perverting the course of justice and was sentenced to life imprisonment with a minimum term of 35 years.

Skrapz was found guilty of perverting the course of justice for allegedly assisting in the disposal of evidence, and sentenced to 4 years and 9 months, but was immediately released due to time served in custody on 2 February 2024.

=== Jay Midge/Don Midgey and Nines jailed ===
In 2013, Nines was sentenced to 18 months imprisonment for possession of cannabis with intent to supply. According to Nines when he spoke to Chuckie Online in the "JD in the Duffle Bag Podcast", Nines recorded his promotional mixtape called "Gone 'Til November" the weekend before the court judge would summon him for sentencing. Nines on his twitter page gave his prison mailing address, to which many of his fans sent him fan mail. Upon his release, Nines bought expensive gifts and sent them by mail, and also drove round to some of the fans's houses who wrote fan mail for him whilst Nines was sitting time in prison. This event was recorded on online music and interview platform SBTV.

On 12 August 2021, Jason Thompson (a.k.a. Jay Midge/Don Midgey) and Courtney Leon Freckleton (a.k.a. Nines) admitted to money laundering and conspiring to import cannabis into the UK from Poland and Spain.

=== Trapstar Toxic jailed ===
Trapstar Toxic was caught out, which revealed him selling drugs. It was reported to the police, which led to a raid in his home in Willesden in April 2018. Toxic pleaded guilty to the offences on 27 June 2018, and was jailed for five years at Harrow Crown Court on 1 March 2019.

== Music Videos ==
- #CSB Q2T x Chappo (Ice City Boyz) - No Filter (Music Video) | @MixtapeMadness
- CRS ICE CITY LINE OF FIRE 2 FUNDZ, JMAN, SKRAPZ, FATZ, STORM, ELMINO, L S
- Chappo (Ice City Boyz) - Straight Gazz (Music Video) Prod By SvOnTheBeat | Pressplay
- Chappo x Sav (Ice City Boyz) #CSB - Bang Bros (Music Video) | @MixtapeMadness
- Chappo X Sav (Ice City Boyz) #CSB - First Half [Music Video] | GRM Daily
- Chappo x Sav (Ice City Boyz) #CSB - If It Ain't CSB [Music Video] | Link Up TV
- Chappo x Sav (Ice City Boyz) #CSB - Winning | @MixtapeMadness
- Chappo x Q2T (Ice City Boyz) - Figure 8 #Gazzi (Music Video) | Pressplay
- Fatz - #StreetHeat Freestyle [@FATHEAD8] | Link Up TV
- #IceCityBoyz Q2T x Chappo CSB - Rock N Roll [Music Video] | GRM Daily
- IceCityBoyz Q2T x Chappo - Plugged In W/ Fumez The Engineer
- Ice City Boyz (Fatz, J Styles, Streetz, Toxic) - Pressure [Music Video] @icecitynw | Link Up TV
- Ice City Boyz (J Styles x Fatz x Streetz) - Statement [Music Video] | GRM Daily
- Ice City Boyz (J Styles, Streetz & Fatz) - 2AM Freestyle [Music Video] | GRM Daily
- Ice City Boyz (Fatz, Streetz, Toxic, J Styles) - Conflict (Music Video) @icecitynw | Link Up TV
