= Varkey Foundation =

Nonprofit arm of GEMS Education

- Formation: 2010; 16 years ago
- Founders: Sunny Varkey
- Type: Charitable foundation
- Headquarters: London, United Kingdom
- Region served: Worldwide
- Key people: Sunny Varkey (Chairman)
- Website: varkeyfoundation.org
- Formerly called: Varkey GEMS Foundation

The Varkey Foundation, initially the Varkey GEMS Foundation, is the nonprofit arm of GEMS Education, an education management company. It was formed in 2010 by Indian businessman Sunny Varkey, GEMS chairman.

The Varkey Foundation has partnered with a variety of major global organizations including UNESCO, UNICEF, and the Clinton Global Initiative. It gives out the Global Teacher Prize, a US$1 million award.

== History ==
The foundation was formed by Sunny Varkey in 2010 as the philanthropic arm of GEMS Education, and was initially called the Varkey GEMS Foundation. Its stated intention is to impact 100 impoverished children for every child enrolled at GEMS schools. Bill Clinton was involvement at the official launch of the foundation.

Sunny Varkey is chairman of the Varkey Foundation. The foundation's trustees are Sunny Varkey, as well as his sons Dino and Jay Varkey.

The foundation has a Teacher Training Programme in under-served communities.

In 2013, the foundation launched the annual Global Education and Skills Forum, in partnership with UNESCO and the UAE Ministry of Education. Bill Clinton gave the inaugural keynote address at the 2013 summit.

In October 2013, the foundation published the Global Teacher Status Index, a 53-page study on the public and social status of teachers in 21 countries around the world.

=== Global Teacher Prize ===
In order to raise the status of teaching, at the second annual Global Education and Skills Forum in March 2014, the foundation launched the Global Teacher Prize, an annual $1 million award to an exceptional teacher who has made an outstanding contribution to the profession.
