= AIM Independent Music Awards =

British music award

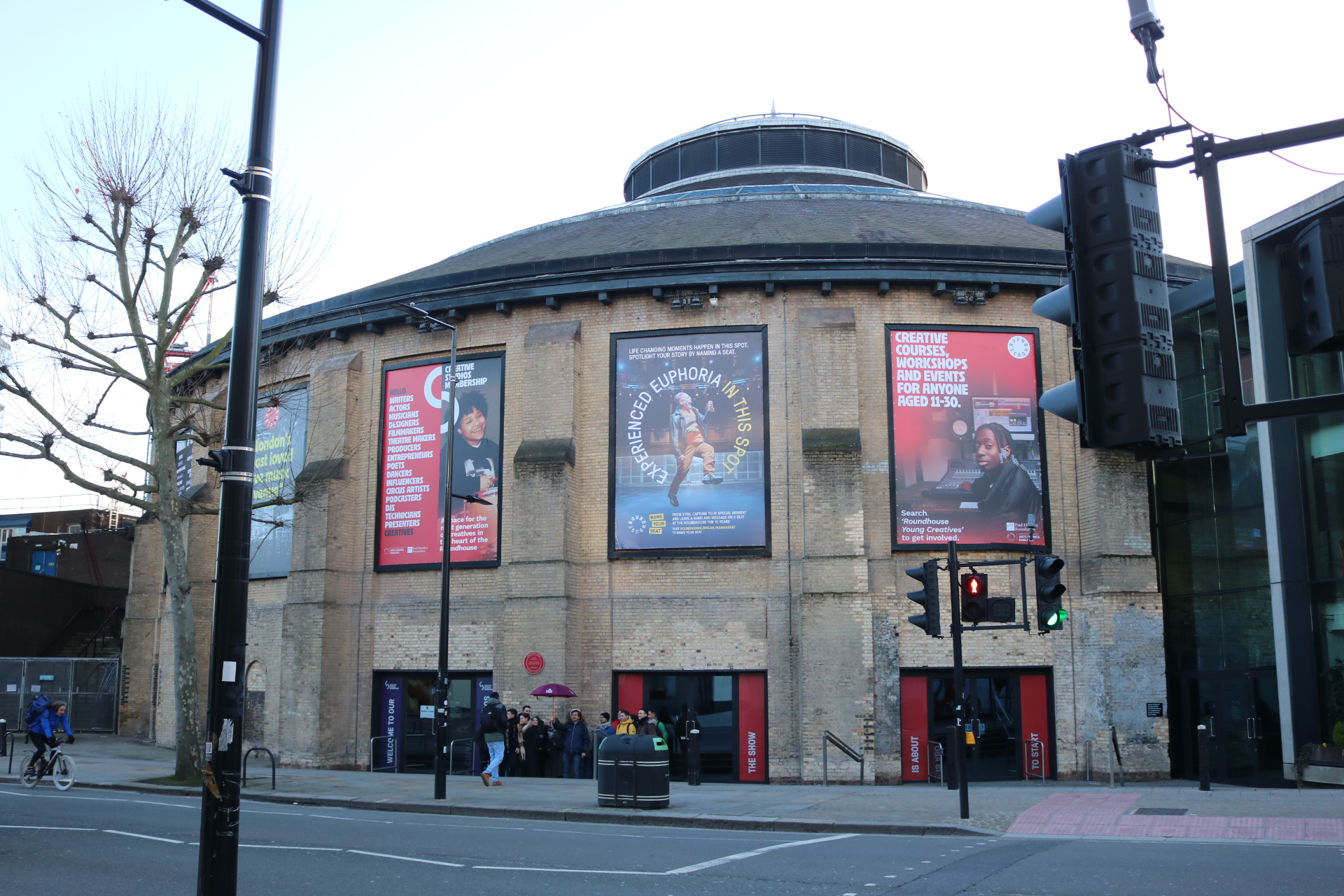
- Roundhouse has been the venue of the award ceremony since 2019.
- Type: Music Awards
- Venue: Floridita, Soho (2011); The Brewery, Clerkenwell (2012-2018); Roundhouse, Camden (2019-present)
- Country: United Kingdom
- Presented by: Association of Independent Music (AIM)
- First award: November 10, 2011; 15 years ago
- Website: www.aimawards.co.uk

The AIM Independent Music Awards, hosted by the Association of Independent Music (commonly abbreviated to AIM), began in 2011. It is established through a collection of independent record labels and providing service and support to independent and smaller artists and record labels globally, achieving recognition for their efforts and works. The AIM Independent Music Awards are also providing recipients with greater opportunities to further expand their careers and name in the music industry.

== About ==
=== The Association of Independent Music ===
The Association of Independent Music is a non-profit organization initiated in March 1999 and the current AIM's CEO is Paul Pacifico which previously held titles as CEO of the Featured Artists' Coalition (commonly abbreviated to FAC) and President of the International Artists Organisation (commonly abbreviated to IAO), a professor at the Berklee College of Music (the overseas campus in Valencia, Spain) and also owns his own Independent music company. The trade body was initiated in order to represent smaller indie artists, bands and labels. The organization provides support, education, publicity and assistance to their members through music awards and festivals. The Association of Independent Music advocate"providing a collective voice for UK's independent music industry" and "supporting UK's independent music." The organisation has expanded and representing approximately eight hundred varying record labels, artists and companies of diverse sorts within the music industry. The organisation are also branching into other trade bodies, such as the Association of Independent Festivals.

=== The Association of Independent Festivals ===
The Association of Independent Festivals (commonly abbreviated to AIF) are being a division of the AIM which are works with the direct aim of aiding independent festivals and labels. The aims of the Association of Independent Festivals is "represent, empower and provide a vital support network to independent festivals organizers." The trade body was initially founded in 2008 by DJ Robert John Gorham, more commonly known as Rob da Bank (who is also founder of the annual Bestival music festival), and Bestival director Ben Turner. The body currently represents approximately fifty member events.

The Association of Independent Festivals member events
A Boundless Summer - Borde Hill Garden
Adobe in the Park
ArcTanGent Festival
Barn On The Farm Festival
Belladrum Festival
Bestival
Blissfields Festival
Brecon Jazz Festival
Brownstock Music Festival
Camp Bestival
Common People
Eden Sessions
End of The Road
Fire in the Mountain
Isle of Wight Festival
Secret Garden Party
Tramlines Festival
2000trees
Y Not Festival

== Past winners and nominees ==
=== Winners and nominees in the 2010s ===
==== 2011 ====
- Best live act: Frank Turner
- Independent breakthrough of the year: SBTRKT
- Hardest working band or artist: Frank Turner
- Best difficult second album: Adele – 21
- Best small label: Stolen Recordings
- Independent entrepreneur of the year: Rob da Bank
- Most played independent act: Adele
- Innovative marketing campaign of the year: Ninja Tune
- Special catalogue release of the year: Matador Records – Matador at 21
- Indie champion award: John Robb – Louder than War
- Best independent festival: Bearded Theory
- Outstanding contribution to music: Bjork
- Pioneer award: Laurence Bell – Domino records

==== 2012 ====
- Best live act: The Prodigy
- Independent breakthrough of the year: Alt-J
- Hardest working band or artist: 65daysofstatic
- Best difficult second album: First Aid Kit (band) – The Lion's Roar (album)
- Independent album of the year: Enter Shikari – A Flash Flood of Colour
- Best small label: Black Butter Records
- Genre spotlight award: Wiley – Evolve or Be Extinct
- Independent entrepreneur of the year: Simon Raymonde – Bella Union
- Most played independent act: Adele
- Special catalogue release of the year: The 13th Floor Elevators – Music of the Spheres
- Independent label of the year: 4AD
- Indie champion award: Ian Evans – IME Music
- Best independent festival: LeeFest
- Outstanding contribution to music: Edwyn Collins
- Pioneer award: Daniel Miller – Mute Records

==== 2015 ====
Year	Nominee / work	Award	Result
2015
2015	Erased Tapes Records	Best Small Label	Won
2015	Young Fathers - White Men Are Black Men Too	Best Difficult Second Album	Won
2015	Cities of Darkscorch Boardgame	Special Catalogue Release of the Year	Won
2015	Swans	Hardest Working Band of Artist	Won
2015	Brainchild Festival	Golden Welly Award for Best Independent Festival	Won
2015	Wolf Alice	Independent Breakthrough of the Year	Won
2015	Marc Riley, BBC 6 Music	Indie Champion	Won
2015	Flying Lotus- 'Never Catch Me'	Independent Video of the Year	Won
2015	All Time Low	'Best Live Act	Won
2015	FKA twigs - 'Two Weeks'	Independent Track of the Year	Won
2015	Jungle	PPL Award for Most Played New Independent Act	Won
2015	Enter Shikari - The Mindsweep	Independent Album of the Year	Won
2015	Transgressive Records	Independent Label of the Year	Won
2015	Digby Pearson of Earache Records	Pioneer Award	Won
2015	Peter Quicke, Matt Black and Jonathan More of Ninja Tune	Innovator Award	Won
2015	Skepta	Outstanding Contribution to Music	Won

==== 2016 ====
Year	Nominee / work	Award	Result
2016
2016	Numbers	Best Small Label	Won
2016	Daughter, Not to Disappear	Best Difficult Second Album	Won
2016	Slade, When Slade Rocked the World	Special Catalogue Release of the Year	Won
2016	Darren Hayman	Hardest Working Band/Artist	Won
2016	Brainchild Festival	Golden Welly Award for Best Independent Festival	Won
2016	Christine and the Queens	Independent Breakthrough of the Year	Won
2016	Jon Tolley	Indie Champion Award	Won
2016	Oscar - 'Sometimes'	Independent Video of the Year	Won
2016	Babymetal	Best Live Act	Won
2016	Adele - 'Hello'	Independent Track of the Year	Won
2016	Sigala	PPL Award for Most Played New Independent Act	Won
2016	Scott Gorham	Riff Lord Award	Won
2016	Stormzy	Innovator Award	Won
2016	Little Simz - A Curious Tale of Trials + Persons	Independent Album of the Year	Won
2016	Epitaph/ANTI	Independent Label of the Year	Won
2016	Róisín Murphy	Outstanding Contribution to Music	Won
2016	Richard Russell, XL Recordings	Pioneer Award	Won

==== 2017 ====
- Pioneer Award: Steve Beckett (Warp Records)
- Outstanding Contribution to Music: The Dillinger Escape Plan
- Innovator Award: Boy Better Know
- Independent Label of the Year: Because Music
- Independent Album of the Year: Stormzy – Gang Signs & Prayer
- Most Played New Independent Act: Stormzy
- Independent Video of the Year: DJ Shadow – "Nobody Speak" (featuring Run the Jewels)
- Independent Track of the Year: The xx – "On Hold"
- Indie Champion Award: Katie Riding and Joe Daniel (Independent Label Market)
- Best Independent Festival: Lost Evenings
- Best Difficult Second Album: Jlin – Black Origami
- Special Catalogue Release of the Year: Lovely Creatures: The Best of Nick Cave and the Bad Seeds (1984–2014)
- Hardest Working Group or Artist: Shao Dow
- Independent Breakthrough of the Year: Sampha
- Best Live Act: Counterfeit
- Best Small Label: Planet Mu

==== 2018 ====
- Independent Album of the Year: Nadine Shah – Holiday Destination
- Independent Track of the Year: Peggy Gou – "It Makes You Forget (Itgehane)"
- Best Sophomore Release: Let's Eat Grandma – I'm All Ears
- UK Breakthrough of the Year: Jorja Smith
- International Breakthrough of the Year: Phoebe Bridgers
- Best Live Act: Erasure
- Hardest Working Group or Artist: Idles
- Outstanding Contribution to Music: Tracey Thorn
- Pioneer Award: Goldie
- Innovator Award: Sophie
- Best Creative Packaging: Black Sabbath – The Ten Year War
- Independent Label of the Year: Ninja Tune
- Best Small Label: Black Acre Records
- Indie Champion Award: Femi Adeyemi (NTS Radio)
- Most Played New Independent Act: Dave
- Independent Video of the Year: Novo Amor – "Birthplace" (Directors: Sil van der Woerd and Jorik Dozy)

==== 2019 awards winners ====
- Best Live Act: Gerry Cinnamon
- Best Small Label: Scruff of the Neck
- Best Creative Packaging: Various Artists, handpicked and curated in collaboration with The Rolling Stones – Confessin' the Blues
- UK Independent Breakthrough: Idles
- Outstanding Contribution to Music: Debbie Harry
- Best Independent Album: Dave – Psychodrama
- Best Difficult Second Album: Idles – Joy as an Act of Resistance
- Most Played New Independent Artist: Freya Ridings
- International Breakthrough: Jade Bird
- Innovator Award: Allen Kovac
- Best Independent Video: Hot Chip – "Hungry Child"
- Best Independent Track: Dave – "Funky Friday" (featuring Fredo)
- One to Watch: Georgia
- Best Independent Label: Partisan Records
- Pioneer Award: Johnny Marr
- Indie Champion: Charles Caldas

=== 2020s winners and nominees ===
==== 2020 ====
- UK Independent Breakthrough: Moses Boyd
- Best Creative Packaging: Digga D – Double Tap Diaries
- Best Small Label: Speedy Wunderground
- Best Independent Remix: Lafawndah – Tourist X Nídia Rework
- One to Watch: Arlo Parks
- Best Independent Video: The Howl & the Hum – "The Only Boy Racer Left on the Island"
- Best Difficult Second Album: FKA twigs – Magdalene
- International Breakthrough: Yaeji
- Best Independent Album: Sarathy Korwar – More Arriving
- Best Live Act: Five Finger Death Punch
- Best Independent Track: Flying Lotus – "More" (featuring Anderson Paak)
- Best Independent Label: Jazz re:freshed
- Outstanding Contribution to Music: Tony Allen
- Most Played New Independent Artist: Freya Ridings
- Pioneer Award: Little Simz
- Innovator Award: AJ Tracey
- Special Recognition Award: Vince Clarke
- Indie Champion: Helen Smith

==== 2021 ====
- UK Independent Breakthrough: Arlo Parks
- International Breakthrough: Jayda G
- Best Independent Track: Enny – "Peng Black Girls" (featuring Amia Brave)
- Best Independent Album: Arlo Parks – Collapsed in Sunbeams
- Best (Difficult) Second Album: Fontaines D.C. – A Hero's Death
- Best Independent Remix: Ela Minus – "megapunk" (Elkka Remix)
- One to Watch: Enny
- Best Creative Packaging: Working Men's Club – Working Men's Club
- Best Independent Video: Wesley Joseph – "Thrilla"
- Best Independent Label: Forever Living Originals
- Best Small Label: Strut Records
- Most Played New Independent Artist: Lauv
- Best Live (Streamed) Act: Ben Böhmer
- Pioneer Award: Tricky
- Innovator Award: Adrian Sherwood
- Outstanding Contribution to Music: Joan Armatrading
- Indie Champion: Love Record Stores Day and Bandcamp
- Diversity Champion: Paulette Long

==== 2022 ====
UK Independent Breakthrough	International Breakthrough
Wet Leg; Children of Zeus; Knucks; Nova Twins; Warmduscher	Blxst; Amyl and the Sniffers; KOKOROKO; Mdou Moctar; Mitski
Best Independent Track	Best Independent EP/Mixtape
"Antagonist" – Nova Twins; "Broken Homes" – Wu-Lu; "Chaise Longue" – Wet Leg; "Jackie" – Yves Tumor; "Protein" – Jeshi featuring Obongjayar; "So U Kno" – Overmono; "Starlight" – Dave; "Tears in the Club" – FKA Twigs featuring The Weeknd; "You Could Be" – ANZ featuring George Riley	Angelica – Taahliah; At What Cost? – Surya Sen; Caprisongs – FKA Twigs; Still Slipping Vol. 1 – Joy Orbison; Ultramarine – Wesley Joseph
Best Independent Album	Best [Difficult] Second Album
Mother – Cleo Sol; Balance – Children of Zeus; Gbagada Express – BOJ; Knopperz – Dave Okumu; Nine – Sault; Painless – Nilüfer Yanya; Unlearning – Walt Disco; We're All Alone in This Together – Dave; When Smoke Rises – Mustafa; Yellow – Emma-Jean Thackray	Painless – Nilüfer Yanya; Ants from Up There – Black Country, New Road; Colourgrade – Tirzah; Painful Enlightenment – Jana Rush; Tread – Ross from Friends
One to Watch	Best Independent Remix
Nia Archives; Barry Can't Swim; Jeshi; Léa Sen; Taahliah	"Lavender & Red Roses (Champion Remix)" – Ibeyi featuring Jorja Smith; "BDE (Florentino Remix)" – Shygirl featuring Kaydy Cain; "Gazzillion Ear (Thom Yorke Man on Fire Remix)" – MF Doom; "No Caroline Remix" – ATO; Remixed by Flohio; "Polite (Mura Masa Remix)" – Erika de Casier
Best Creative Campaign	Best Independent Video
Maylee Todd – Maloo; Fontaines D.C. – Skinty Fia; Mitski – Laurel Hell; Obongjayar – Some Nights I Dream of Doors; Radiohead – Kid A Mnesia	"3210" – Jeshi; "Cold Summer" – Wesley Joseph; "Made of Gold" – Ibeyi featuring Pa Salieu; "Softly" – Arlo Parks; "Tears in the Club" – FKA Twigs featuring The Weeknd
Music Entrepreneur of the Year	Most Played New Independent Artist
Corey Johnson (Defenders Ent); Peter Adarkwah (Barely Breaking Even); Karen Emmanuel (Key Production); Laura Lewis-Paul (Saffron Music); Jamie Oborne (Dirty Hit/All on Red Management)	D.O.D; Arlo Parks; KC Lights; Rathbone Place; Wet Leg
Best Independent Label	Best Boutique Label
Rough Trade Records; Domino Recording Company; Ninja Tune; Partisan Records; Soundway Records	Local Action; Chess Club; Edition Records; Finesse Foreva; Rough Bones
Best Live Performer
Mitski; Ben Böhmer; The Hu; Idles; Shao Dow
Outstanding Contribution to Music	Independent Champion
Lethal Bizzle	Kenny Gates and Michel Lambot
Diversity Champion	Innovator
Stormzy	Rina Sawayama

==== 2023 ====
The 2023 AIM Independent Music Awards were presented on 26 September 2023 at the Roundhouse in London. The first set of nominees was announced on 19 July 2023. The rest of the nominees as well as the Best Live Performance and Diversity Champion recipients were announced on 23 August 2023.

UK Independent Breakthrough	One to Watch
Shygirl (Because Music); Ezra Collective (Partisan Records); I. Jordan (Ninja Tune); Overmono (XL Recordings); Suki Waterhouse (Sub Pop)	Laughta (MDLBEAST Records); Jessica Winter (Lucky Number); Juice Menace (Supernature); Flowerovlove (FAE GRP); Master Peace (PMR)
PPL Award for Most Played New Independent Artist	Music Entrepreneur of the Year
Wet Leg (Domino Records); AntsLive (Payday Records, Trademark Records); John Summit (Off the Grid Records); Surya Sen (Skint Records); Vibe Chemistry (DnB Allstars Records)	Caius Pawson (Young / Young Space); fAlex Brees (Un:hurd); Jess Kangalee (Good Energy PR); Keturah Cummings (Forward Slash); Yasin El Ashrafi (HQ Familia)
Best Boutique Label	Best Independent Label
Rough Bones; Chess Club; Glasgow Underground; Houndstooth; So Young Records	Hospital Records; Defected Records; Forever Living Originals; One Little Independent; Transgressive
Best Independent Track	Best Independent Album
"Escapism" – Raye featuring 070 Shake (Human Re Sources); "Hurt You" – Connie Constance (Play It Again Sam); "Charge It" – ENNY (FAMM); "Three Drums" – Four Tet (Text Records); "Dream Another" – Makaya McCraven (XL Recordings); "Good Lies" – Overmono (XL Recordings); "Shlut" – Shygirl (Because Music); "Selfish Soul" – Sudan Archives (Stones Throw Records); "Spitting Off the Edge of the World" – Yeah Yeah Yeahs featuring Perfume Genius (Secretly Canadian); "Echolalia" – Yves Tumor (Warp Records)	God Save the Streets – Avelino (More Music Records / OddChild Music); Raven – Kelela (Warp Records); No Thank You – Little Simz (Forever Living Originals); Supernova – Nova Twins (Marshall Records); Some Nights I Dream of Doors – Obongjayar (September Recordings); Hideous Bastard – Oliver Sim (Young); My 21st Century Blues – Raye featuring 070 Shake (Human Re Sources); Hold the Girl – Rina Sawayama (Dirty Hit); Nymph – Shygirl (Because Music); Loggerhead – Wu-Lu (Warp Records)
Best Independent EP/Mixtape	Best Independent Video
We Go Again – ENNY (FAMM); Adultsville – Bellah (Base 'N' Rebulz X Marathon Music Group); Limerance – Jessica Winter (Lucky Number); EP2 – Saint Joshua (Ditto Music); BABYLON IX – Yunè Pinku (PLATOON)	"MONSOON" – Wesley Joseph (EEVILTWINN); "No Confusion" – Ezra Collective featuring Kojey Radical (Partisan Records); "Enough for Love" – Kelela (Warp Records); "I Wish It Was Me (Live)" – Obongjayar (September Recordings); "Escapism" – Raye featuring 070 Shake (Human Re Sources)
Best Independent Remix	Best Creative Campaign
"Butterfly Effect" (Nu:Tone remix) – GLXY featuring Hugh Hardie & Visionobi (Hospital Records); "Ovule" (Sega Bodega remix) – Björk featuring Shygirl (One Little Independent); "Cliche" (Soulwax remix) – Charlotte Adigéry & Bolis Pupul (Deewee / Because Music); "GMT" (Jamie xx remix) – Oliver Sim (Young); "Wolf" (Boys Noize remix) – Yeah Yeah Yeahs (Secretly Canadian)	Partisan Records (Where I'm Meant to Be – Ezra Collective); Because Music (Nymph – Shygirl); Dirty Hit (Hold the Girl – Rina Sawayama); Human Re Sources (My 21st Century Blues – Raye); Ninja Tune (Heavy Heavy – Young Fathers); XL Recordings (With a Hammer – Yaeji)
Best Live Performance	Diversity Champion
Björk	Dr. Charisse Beaumont
Independent Champion	Innovator Award
Resident Music; Jaguar Bingham; Cafe Oto	Dan Carey
Outstanding Contribution to Music
Stephen & David Dewaele - Soulwax / 2manydjs (Because Music / PIAS)

==== 2024 ====
The 2024 AIM Independent Music Awards were presented on 17 October 2024 at the Roundhouse in London. The first set of nominees was announced on 29 August 2024. The nominees for the remaining categories as well as the Diversity Champion recipient were announced on 1 October 2024.

UK Independent Breakthrough	One to Watch
Barry Can't Swim (Ninja Tune); Bar Italia (Matador Records); Casisdead (XL Recordings); Saint Harison (Tell Your Friends); Wunderhorse (Communion Records)	OneDa (Heavenly Recordings); Antony Szmierek (LAB Records); Kitty Amor (Defected Records); Lynks (Heavenly Recordings); Miso Extra (Transgressive Records)
PPL Award for Most Played New Independent Artist	Music Entrepreneur of the Year
Far From Saints (Ignition Records); Barry Can't Swim (Ninja Tune); Coach Party (Chess Club Records); Popeth (Recordiau Côsh Records); Tom A. Smith (TYM Records)	Meg Carnie (South Lanes Studios); Andrew Batey (Beatdapp); Atlanta Cobb (Music Industry Mentor); Colin Batsa (EGA Distro); Tom Allen (Downtown Music)
Best Boutique Label	Best Independent Label
Sonic Cathedral; AD 93; Houndstooth; LAB Records; New Soil	Heavenly Recordings; Ninja Tune; Partisan Records; Sub Pop Records; Transgressive Records
Best Independent Track	Best Independent Album
"Spirit 2.0" – Sampha (Young); "All Black Everything" – Amy Gadiaga (Jazz re:freshed); "Venom" – Casisdead (XL Recordings); "Ajala" – Ezra Collective (Partisan Records); "Starburster" – Fontaines D.C. (XL Recordings); "Set the Roof" – Hudson Mohawke & Nikki Nair (Warp Records); "Little Things" – Jorja Smith (FAMM); "Better Way To Live" – Kneecap & Grian Chatten (Heavenly Recordings); "An Ever Changing View" – Matthew Halsall (Gondwana Records); "1200RPM" – NikNak (Accidental Records)	Falling or Flying – Jorja Smith (FAMM); LXXXVIII – Actress (Ninja Tune); My Back Was a Bridge for You to Cross – Anohni and the Johnsons (Rough Trade Records); When Will We Land? – Barry Can't Swim (Ninja Tune); Rolling Stone – D-Block Europe (EGA Distro); The Collective – Kim Gordon (Matador Records); The Sunset Violent – Mount Kimbie (Warp Records); Dreamer – Nabihah Iqbal (Ninja Tune); Find Your Flame – Nubiyan Twist (Strut Records); Reflection – Skrapz (EGA Distro)
Best Independent EP/Mixtape	Best Independent Video
Thanks for Hating – Potter Payper (EGA Distro); Un/limited Love – George Riley (Ninja Tune); Strength to Strength – Headie One & K-Trap (One Records and Thousand8); Box – Honesty (Partisan Records); If Not Now? – JGrrey (PACE, a subsidiary of Marathon Music Group)	"Only" – Sampha (Young); "Poolside" – Gia Ford (Chrysalis Records); "A Love International" – Khruangbin (Dead Oceans); "I Might Be Fake" – Master Peace featuring Georgia (PMR Records); "My Love Mine All Mine" – Mitski (Dead Oceans)
Best Independent Remix	Best Creative Campaign
"Joy (Life Goes On)" – Ezra Collective & Joy (Anonymous) featuring Sampa the Great (Partisan Records); "Freakalizer (The Egyptian Lover Remix)" – Sudan Archives (Stones Throw Records); "Little Things x Gypsy Woman" (L Beats Mashup) – Jorja Smith (FAMM); "Oral" (Olof Dreijer Remix) – Björk featuring Rosalía (One Little Independent); "Mine O' Mine" (P-rallel Remix) – Aluna & Jayda G (Mad Decent under exclusive licence to Because Music)	Warp Records (Blackbox Life Recorder 21f / In a Room7 F760 – Aphex Twin); Chrysalis Records (Our Brand Could Be Yr Life – Bodega); Dead Oceans (Everything Is Alive – Slowdive); Identity Music ("Snowman" – Lofi Girl); Young (Lahai – Sampha)
Best Live Performer	Best Independent Record Store
Pendulum (Mushroom Music); Frank Turner (Xtra Mile Recordings); Kneecap (Heavenly Recordings); Laura Misch (One Little Independent); Raye (Human Re Sources)	Drift; Honest Jon's; Piccadilly; Rough Trade Bristol; Stranger Than Paradise Records
Diversity Champion	Innovator Award
Silvastone	Neneh Cherry
Independent Champion	Outstanding Contribution to Music
Music Venue Trust	Sparks
