= Sekou (singer) =

British singer-songwriter (born 2004)

- Born: Sekou Sylla; September 18, 2004 (age 22); Ashby-de-la-Zouch, Leicestershire, England
- Genres: Soul; R&B; pop
- Occupations: Singer; songwriter; musician
- Instruments: Vocals, Piano, producer

Sekou Sylla (born September 18, 2004) is a British-Ivorian singer from Leicestershire. He was nominated for the Brit Award for Rising Star in 2024.

== Early life ==
From Ashby-de-la-Zouch in Leicestershire, he attended Ashby School and Ivanhoe College.

== Career ==
Described as having a rich and bottom-heavy baritone voice, Sekou was signed to Good Soldier Records at 16 years old after posting songs of himself singing on platforms such as Tik Tok and SoundCloud.

In 2022, he played in the BBC Music Introducing tent at the 2022 Glastonbury Festival after being handpicked to play by Arlo Parks. Prior to that he performed at the wedding of Brooklyn Beckham and Nicola Peltz. He also supported John Legend on tour that year.

His debut EP Out of Mind was released in June 2023, was released when he was 18 years old. He co-wrote songs on the EP with Dixson as well as working with Sounwave and Al Shux His single "Better Man" and follow-up "Time Will Tell", co-written with Theron Thomas, were released in 2023. In 2023, he performed on the BBC Two television show Later… with Jools Holland and had his music featured on the television dating show Love Island.

Sekou was nominated for the Brit Award for Rising Star at the 2024 BRIT Awards.

In 2024, Sekou performed the theme tune for the BBC One musical drama This Town, created by Steven Knight and set in the West Midlands.. In 2026 Sekou appeared again on Later.... with Jools Holland singing "Dangerous Lover" and "Catching Bodies".

== Discography ==
=== Mixtapes ===
List of mixtapes, with selected details
Title	Details
In a World We Don't Belong (Pt. 1)	Released: 14 November 2025; Label: EMI; Formats: Digital download, streaming
In a World We Don't Belong (Pt. 2)	Released: 26 June 2026; Label: EMI; Formats: Digital download, streaming

=== Extended plays ===
List of extended plays, with selected details
Title	Details
Out of Mind	Released: 30 June 2023; Label: Island; Formats: Digital download, streaming

=== Singles ===
List of singles as lead artist, showing year released and album name
Title	Year	Peak chart positions				Album
Title	Year	EST Air.	GER Air.	JPN Over.	NZ Hot	Album
"Better Man"	2023	—	—	—	—	Out of Mind
"Forgiving Myself"	2023	—	—	—	—	Out of Mind
"Time Will Tell"	2023	—	—	—	—	Out of Mind
"Crying"	2024	—	—	—	—	Non-album singles
"Let Go of Me Slowly"	2024	—	—	—	—	Non-album singles
"Catching Bodies"	2025	—	—	—	40	In a World We Don't Belong (Pt. 1)
"Never Gunna Give You Up"	2025	—	—	—	—	In a World We Don't Belong (Pt. 1)
"Love Language"	2025	—	—	—	—	In a World We Don't Belong (Pt. 1)
"Dangerous Lover"	2026	94	97	11	—	In a World We Don't Belong (Pt. 2)
"Does She Know"	2026	—	—	—	—	In a World We Don't Belong (Pt. 2)
"This Christmas"	2026	—	—	—	—	Non-album single
"—" denotes a recording that did not chart or was not released in that territory.

=== Guest appearances ===
List of non-single guest appearances, showing year released, other artists and album name
Title	Year	Other artists	Album	Notes
"Longevity"	2024	Skrapz, Potter Payper	Reflection	Featured artist
"Champagne Problems"	2024	Nines, Skrapz	Quit While You're Ahead	Background vocals
"Limitless"	2025	Central Cee	Can't Rush Greatness	Background vocals (uncredited)
"Everybody Plays to Win"	2025	Kevin Abstract, Ameer Vann, Love Spells	Blush Demo Tape	Featured artist
"Text Me"	2025	Kevin Abstract	Blush	Featured artist
"Too Long"	2025	Justin Bieber	Swag	Background vocals

== Awards and nominations ==
Year	Award	Category	Nominee(s) / work(s)	Result
2026	MOBO Awards	Best Newcomer	Sekou	Nominated
