= List of Official Albums Streaming Chart number ones of 2023 =

The Official Albums Streaming Chart is a weekly music chart in the United Kingdom which calculates the most popular albums on audio streaming sites.

== Number ones ==
Key
No.	nth album to top the Official Albums Streaming Chart
re	Return of an album to number one

Contents

No.	Artist (Note: The artist, song, date of reaching number one and number of weeks at number one are those given by the OCC.)	Album	Record label (Note: The record labels are those given by the OCC.)	Reached number one (for the week ending)	Weeks at number one	Ref.
re	Michael Bublé	Christmas	Reprise	5 January 2023	1	
re	SZA	SOS	RCA	12 January 2023	4	
re	SZA	SOS	RCA	19 January 2023	4	
re	SZA	SOS	RCA	26 January 2023	4	
re	SZA	SOS	RCA	2 February 2023	4	
re	The Weeknd	The Highlights	Republic/XO	9 February 2023	13	
re	The Weeknd	The Highlights	Republic/XO	16 February 2023	13	
re	The Weeknd	The Highlights	Republic/XO	23 February 2023	13	
re	The Weeknd	The Highlights	Republic/XO	2 March 2023	13	
re	The Weeknd	The Highlights	Republic/XO	9 March 2023	13	
re	The Weeknd	The Highlights	Republic/XO	16 March 2023	13	
re	The Weeknd	The Highlights	Republic/XO	23 March 2023	13	
re	The Weeknd	The Highlights	Republic/XO	30 March 2023	13	
re	The Weeknd	The Highlights	Republic/XO	6 April 2023	13	
re	The Weeknd	The Highlights	Republic/XO	13 April 2023	13	
re	The Weeknd	The Highlights	Republic/XO	20 April 2023	13	
re	The Weeknd	The Highlights	Republic/XO	27 April 2023	13	
re	The Weeknd	The Highlights	Republic/XO	4 May 2023	13	
105	Nines	Crop Circle 2	Warner	11 May 2023	1	
106	Ed Sheeran	-	Asylum	18 May 2023	2	
106	Ed Sheeran	-	Asylum	25 May 2023	2	
107	Lewis Capaldi	Broken By Desire To Be Heavenly Sent	EMI	1 June 2023	1	
re	Taylor Swift	Midnights	EMI	8 June 2023	2	
re	Taylor Swift	Midnights	EMI	15 June 2023	2	
re	Harry Styles	Harry's House	Columbia	22 June 2023	1	
re	Harry Styles	Harry's House	Columbia	29 June 2023	1	
108	Elton John	Diamonds	Mercury/UMG	6 July 2023	1	
re	The Weeknd	The Highlights	Republic/XO	13 July 2023	1	
109	Taylor Swift	Speak Now (Taylor's Version)	EMI	20 July 2023	1	
110	J Hus	Beautiful and Brutal Yard	Black Butter	27 July 2023	1	
re	The Weeknd	The Highlights	Republic/XO	3 August 2023	1	
111	Travis Scott	Utopia	Epic	10 August 2023	3	
111	Travis Scott	Utopia	Epic	17 August 2023	3	
111	Travis Scott	Utopia	Epic	24 August 2023	3	
re	The Weeknd	The Highlights	Republic/XO	31 August 2023	1	
112	Burna Boy	I Told Them...	Atlantic	7 September 2023	1	
re	Travis Scott	Utopia	Epic	14 September 2023	1	
113	Olivia Rodrigo	Guts	Geffen	21 September 2023	4	
113	Olivia Rodrigo	Guts	Geffen	28 September 2023	4	
113	Olivia Rodrigo	Guts	Geffen	5 October 2023	4	
113	Olivia Rodrigo	Guts	Geffen	12 October 2023	4	
114	Drake	For All the Dogs	OVO/Republic	19 October 2023	3	
114	Drake	For All the Dogs	OVO/Republic	26 October 2023	3	
114	Drake	For All the Dogs	OVO/Republic	2 November 2023	3	
115	Taylor Swift	1989 (Taylor's Version)	EMI	9 November 2023	3	
115	Taylor Swift	1989 (Taylor's Version)	EMI	16 November 2023	3	
115	Taylor Swift	1989 (Taylor's Version)	EMI	23 November 2023	3	
re	Drake	For All the Dogs	OVO/Republic	30 November 2023	1	
re	Taylor Swift	1989 (Taylor's Version)	EMI	7 December 2023	1	
re	Michael Bublé	Christmas	Reprise	14 December 2023	3	
re	Michael Bublé	Christmas	Reprise	21 December 2023	3	
re	Michael Bublé	Christmas	Reprise	28 December 2023	3	
