= Crop Circle 3 =

Studio album by Nines
- Released: 6 October 2023
- Length: 42:38
- Label: Zino
- Producer: 1st Born Music; Babycashy1; Daniel Miles; Handz Beatz; Harrijay; I Don't Rap I Dress; Jackson Romain; Jacob Manson; Jojo Mukeza; Karlos; LuqMakesBeats; ProdByDizzy; RJ Cherry; Show N Prove

Nines chronology
Crop Circle 2 (2023)	Crop Circle 3 (2023)	Quit While You're Ahead (2024)

Singles from Quit While You're Ahead
- 1. "Daily Duppy" Released: 24 September 2023; 2. "Toxic" Released: 5 October 2023

Crop Circle 3 is the fifth studio album by British rapper Nines, released on 6 October 2023, through Nines' own independent record label, Zino Records. It features guest appearances from Bad Boy Chiller Crew, Big Narstie, Blade Brown, Fatz, George the Poet, Little Torment, Mark Morrison, Max Valentine, M Dot R, Miraa May, Mugzz, Ouraa, ShockTown, Skrapz, Streetz, Tiggs Da Author, Trapstar Toxic, and Tunde, while the album's production was primarily handled by Jacob Manson, Karlos, and Show N Prove with assistance from Handz Beatz, Jackson Romain, RJ Cherry, and several other producers. The album serves as a follow-up to Nines' third, Crop Circle 2 (2023) and will serve as the final part of an album trilogy that began with Crop Circle (2018) and continued with Crop Circle 2 (2023). Upon the release of the album, Nines released a short film of the same name.

== Release and promotion ==
Months after the release of the second instalment of his Crop Circle album trilogy, on 15 September 2023, Nines took to his Instagram to announce the release of Crop Circle 3 while sharing the album's cover art and release date for 6 October. On 24 September, Nines released his highly anticipated "Daily Duppy" which premiered on GRM Daily. The song served as the album's lead single. On 30 September, Nines shared the album's official tracklist to his Instagram. On 5 October, just a day prior to the release of the album, Nines released the album's second single, "Toxic" featuring Bad Boy Chiller Crew. Upon the release of the album, Nines released a short film of the same name, co-starring Alhan Gencay, Talliah Storm, and Nines himself.

== Critical reception ==
Professional ratings
Review scores
Source	Rating
AllMusic	3.5/5 stars
The Guardian	4/5 stars
The Observer	4/5 stars

Crop Circle 3 received positive reviews from music critics. Writing for GRM Daily, Niall Smith wrote that "overall, Crop Circle 3 is a solid body of work" and that it's difficult to compare the album to Nines' past work. He stated that on the album, "there's a medley of cohesion, chaos and crystalline penmanship". AllMusic's David Crone wrote that the project is a "smooth, blunt-voiced trap & hip-hop" album and that he "[weaves] struggle and success together in the [his] signature narratives". In a positive review, Tara Joshi for The Guardian hinted towards Nines' retirement from music in her review, writing that "Nines is dreaming of a new, unconfined chapter: perhaps that’s why Crop Circle 3 sounds so enticingly free". The Observer's Damien Morris wrote that "we find Nines in a comfortable holding pattern" and that on the album, "he rehearses familiar topics" ranging from "his irresistibility to women" to "unfeasibly large bags of weed, and displays little desire to traverse deeper hinterlands".

=== Year-end lists ===
Select year-end rankings of Crop Circle 3
Publication	List	Rank	Ref.
Complex UK	Complex UK's Best Albums of 2023	12	

== Track listing ==
Crop Circle 3 track listing
No.	Title	Writer(s)	Producer(s)	Length
1.	"Intro"	Courtney Freckleton	Karlos; Show N Prove; Harrijay	1:57
2.	"Only One" (featuring Skrapz and Ouraa)	Freckleton; Christopher Kyei; Oyinkansola Aderbigbe	Jacob Manson; Jackson Romain	3:04
3.	"So High" (featuring Max Valentine and ShockTown)	Freckleton; Max Valentine; ShockTown; Luke Grieve	Luke Grieve; 1st Born Music	3:59
4.	"Toxic" (featuring Bad Boy Chiller Crew)	Freckleton; Gareth Kelly; Sam Robinson; Kane Welsh	Jacob Manson; ProdByDizzy; LuqMakesBeats; I Don't Rap I Dress; Babycashy1	2:58
5.	"Daily Duppy" (with GRM Daily)	Freckleton	Karlos	3:12
6.	"Never Be Me" (featuring Blade Brown)	Freckleton; Jonathan Wrate	Jacob Manson; Karlos	2:24
7.	"Not Guilty" (featuring Mark Morrison and Tiggs Da Author)	Freckleton; Mark Morrison; Adam Muhabwa	Karlos; Show N Prove	2:34
8.	"I Do" (featuring Mugzz and Tunde)	Freckleton; Mugzz; Olu Finni	Jacob Manson; Show N Prove; RJ Cherry	2:15
9.	"Good Morning"	Freckleton	Jacob Manson; Karlos	2:58
10.	"Max Elliot" (featuring Big Narstie and M Dot R)	Freckleton; Tyrone Lindo; Moses McGeorge	Karlos; Show N Prove	2:41
11.	"My Turn"	Freckleton	Karlos	2:28
12.	"Could of Been" (featuring Miraa May)	Freckleton; Miraa May	Jacob Manson; Handz Beatz	2:26
13.	"Line of Fire Pt. 7" (featuring Fatz, Little Torment, Streetz, and Trapstar Toxic)	Freckleton; Fatz; Little Torment; Streetz; Trapstar Toxic	Karlos	3:19
14.	"Devils Rejects" (featuring Skrapz and George the Poet)	Freckleton; Kyei; George Mpanga; Jacob Manson	Jacob Manson; Handz Beatz	3:22
15.	"Outro" (featuring Debbie)	Freckleton; Debbie Ehirim	Jojo Mukeza; Daniel Miles	3:01
Total length:				42:38

== Charts ==
Chart performance for Crop Circle 3
Chart (2023)	Peak position
Irish Albums (OCC)	12
Scottish Albums (OCC)	13
UK Albums (OCC)	2
UK Independent Albums Chart (OCC)	3
UK R&B Albums (OCC)	1

== Certifications ==
Region	Certification	Certified units/sales
United Kingdom (BPI)	Silver	60,000^{‡}
^{‡} Sales+streaming figures based on certification alone.
