= Modern Groove Syndicate =

Modern Groove Syndicate is a funk band based in Richmond, Virginia.

== Members ==
Members include Daniel Clarke – keyboard (who has toured with Mandy Moore and k.d. lang), Joel DeNunzio - drums, Todd Herrington - bass, JC Kuhl – sax (former member of Agents of Good Roots), and Trey Pollard - guitar. Frank Jackson -guitar

== Awards ==
The band was an Independent Music Awards finalist in 2004 and winner in 2005 with "Too Good That It's Gone" as Best Jazz Song. Modern Groove Syndicate was given Richmond Magazine|Richmond Magazine's 2007 Theresa Pollack Award for excellence in the arts (ensemble. Named Virginia's Best Jazz Band in NineVolt Magazine poll Feb. 22, 2004.

== Discography ==
Releases on Courthouse Records: First release, self-titled, Feb. 15, 2002, CH 1001. Second release, Vessel, Feb. 10, 2004, CH 0903, licensed for release in Japan, May 9, 2007, PVCP-8804, with another coverart on P-VINE Records. Their first CD was a double entry in the 45th Grammies..
