= Crabs in a bucket (disambiguation) =

Crabs in a bucket primarily refers to Crab mentality.

It may also refer to:

- Crabs in a Bucket (album), a 2020 album by Nines
- "Crabs in a Bucket", a song from the Vince Staples album Big Fish Theory
- Last Call, a 2021 film originally titled Crabs in a Bucket

== See also ==
- Crabbing
- "Crabbuckit"
