= MDOT =

MDOT, M-Dot, or M Dot may refer to:

- Maryland Department of Transportation
- Michigan Department of Transportation
- Mississippi Department of Transportation
- M-Dot, an American rapper
- Ironman Triathlon, known for its "M dot" logo
- m-dot, referring to the "m." subdomain used by some mobile websites

== See also ==
- Maine Department of Transportation (MaineDOT)
- Massachusetts Department of Transportation (MassDOT)
- Minnesota Department of Transportation (MnDOT)
- Missouri Department of Transportation (MoDOT)
- Montana Department of Transportation (MDT)
- Bdóte (Mdote)
- M Dot R
