= 2Sides (Side 1) =

EP by Jason Derulo
- Released: November 8, 2019
- Recorded: 2016–2019
- Length: 17:49
- Labels: Beluga Heights; Warner
- Producers: 1Mind; Rogét Chahayed; NOVA Wav; Jacob Manson; MdL; Matt Prime; Sean Small; Nico Stadi; Sam Sumser; Theron Thomas

Jason Derulo chronology
Platinum Hits (2016)	2Sides (Side 1) (2019)	Nu King (2024)

2Sides (Side 1) is the fourth EP by American singer Jason Derulo, released on November 8, 2019, through Beluga Heights Records and Warner Records. None of the songs were premiered before the release of the EP, and following its release none were promoted as singles. The EP was originally intended to be the first part of Derulo's fifth studio album 2Sides, while the second part was due to be released in early 2020; however, Side 2 was confirmed to be cancelled in May 2020, along with confirmation that Derulo had left his longtime record label due to creative differences.

== Background and concept ==
During 2016, Derulo began recording music at his home in Los Angeles and previewed a new song called "Swalla". He subsequently announced the song as his new single on January 2, 2017, noting that it featured rappers Nicki Minaj and Ty Dolla Sign. In May, during an interview at the 2017 Billboard Music Awards, Derulo confirmed that "Swalla" and subsequent singles were part of 21 songs that made up his new album, 777. The album would be released in three parts, each with seven songs being released three months apart. A number of other singles were released in 2017, including "If I'm Lucky" in September and "Tip Toe" (featuring French Montana) in November. Whilst on his 2Sides tour during 2018, Derulo confirmed that the album would no longer be called 777 and was instead named after the tour. Explaining his reason further, Derulo said:

"777 was a stage in my life and it has taken a long time to do this album but this name, 2Sides, is more poignant to where I think I am now in my life and what I think the album exudes – the light and the dark side of who I am – the album exemplifies that in both ways.

People have never seen the urban side of what I do as well so they'll get to see that side for the first time. It's an album that has so many different faces so 2Sides was the more appropriate title."

Upon the album's announcement, press releases explained the concept of 2Sides and Derulo's approach with the project. "2Sides embodies the concept of duality. There's the side the public sees — the star we know and love — but there’s also a darker side, which is slowly revealed." The release was also accompanied by a trailer posted on Derulo's Instagram account.

"Goodbye", a joint-collaboration with David Guetta and featuring Nicki Minaj and Willy William, was released on August 24, 2018. This was followed by another new single, "Mamacita" (featuring Farruko), which was released on July 5, 2019. On August 27, 2019, Derulo released another single called "Too Hot".

== Release and cancellation of Side 2 ==
During an interview with the Official Charts Company, Derulo confirmed his plans to release the album as two seven-track EPs in quick session. He said "I want to do it in doses so people will hear the songs. I still think it's nice to give people a body of work; I'm a touring artist and I like forming a concept on the tour which comes from the album title." He also said that his previous singles "Swalla", "If I'm Lucky", "Tip Toe", and "Goodbye" will not be included on the album because "those songs have had their time. Even though putting them on an album would make it go platinum in two seconds, it's not about the numbers. These are brand new songs, brand new vibes."

On October 21, Derulo confirmed on Instagram that Side 1, the first part of the album, would be released on November 8 and have six songs on it, and that the second part would be released in 2020. He then revealed the tracklist for Side 1 on Twitter on November 1. In May 2020, Derulo confirmed that Side 2 to 2Sides would no longer be released. Explaining the decision to cancel the release, Derulo told Australian radio station KIIS 106.5 that he had spent a "a lot of time trying to get out of his record deal" with Warner Bros. Records and that he was no longer signed to the label due to creative differences.

== Track listing ==
All tracks are written by Derulo; additional writers noted below.

2Sides (Side 1) track listing
No.	Title	Writer(s)	Producer(s)	Length
1.	"F It Up"	Hasan Matthews; Jacob Manson; Johnny Mitchell; Rosina Russell	Jacob Manson	2:37
2.	"Talk About Us" (featuring Stefflon Don)	Manson; Mitchell; Russell; Stephanie Victoria Allen	Manson	3:03
3.	"Best Friend" (featuring Ty Dolla Sign)	McCholloch Sutphin; Rogét Chahayed; Shawn Charles; Tyrone Griffin	1Mind; Chahayed	2:58
4.	"Talk with Your Body"	Brittany Coney; David Frank; Denisia Andrews; Hovey Benjamin; James LaVigne; Matthew Prime; Nico Johann Hartikainen; Pamela Sheyne; Steve Kipner	Matt Prime; Nova Wav; Nico Stadi	3:09
5.	"Be the One"	Mason Levy; Nija Charles; Sam Sumser; Sean Small; Sorana Păcurar; Theron Thomas	MdL; Sumser; Small; Thomas	2:41
6.	"Diamonds"	Sutphin; Chahayed; Charles	1Mind; Chahayed	3:21
Total length:				17:49

== Personnel ==
Credits adapted from AllMusic.

=== Artists ===
- Jason Derulo – lead vocals
- Stefflon Don – featured vocals (track 2)
- Ty Dolla Sign – co-lead vocals (track 3)

=== Musicians and technical ===
- 1Mind – drum programming (3), producer (3, 6)
- Trevor Brown – guitar (5)
- Rogét Chahayed – producer (3, 6)
- Hüseyin Erdinç – saxophone (4)
- Chris Gehringer – mastering (1–6)
- Jason Goldberg – (1)
- Ben Hogarth – recording (1, 4–5)
- Jaycen Joshua – mixing (5)
- Jacob Manson – bass (1), guitar (1), producer (1–2), programmer (1–2)
- Manny Marroquin – mixing (1–2, 4)
- MdL – producer (5)
- Nova Wav – producers (4)
- Matt Prime – producer (4)
- Sean Small – producer (5)
- Nico Stadi – producer (4)
- Sam Sumser – producer (5)
- Theron Thomas – producer (5)
- Julian Vasquez – mixing (3, 6), recording (3)
