= Talk About Us =

Talk About Us may refer to:

- "Talk About Us", a 1999 song by Jennifer Lopez from On the 6
- "Talk About Us", a 2019 song by Jason Derulo featuring Stefflon Don from 2Sides (Side 1)
