= Crabs in a Bucket (album) =

Studio album by Nines
- Released: 28 August 2020
- Recorded: 2019–2020
- Genre: British hip hop; trap
- Length: 52:56
- Label: Zino; Warner
- Producer: Maestro; 1st Born; Da Beatfreakz; DopeBoyzMusic; EY; Harrijay; Jabari on the Beat; Josh King; Karlos; Kz; Lord Kimo; M.O. on the Beats; N2theA; Quincy Tellem; Rudimental; Ruby Retro; Sean Murdz; Show N Prove; Steel Banglez; Sxber Sounds; the Young Nav Michael; the Elements

Nines chronology
Crop Circle (2018)	Crabs in a Bucket (2020)	Crop Circle 2 (2023)

Singles from Crabs in a Bucket
- 1. "Clout" Released: 10 August 2020; 2. "Airplane Mode" Released: 20 August 2020

Crabs in a Bucket is the third studio album by English rapper Nines, released on 28 August 2020 by Zino Records and Warner Records. It is the follow-up to Nines' second album Crop Circle (2018). The album features guest appearances from Headie One, Roy Woods, Nafe Smallz, NorthSideBenji, NSG, Tiggs da Author, among others. It reached number one on the UK Albums Chart. Nines won the MOBO Awards for Album of the Year and Best Hip-Hop Act for the album.

The album was supported by lead single "Clout", peaking at number 49 on the UK Singles Chart, and "Airplane Mode" featuring NSG.

== Recording ==
The album was recorded in various locations, with Nines saying: "I was in different countries—Spain, Paris, Dubai—when I was making this album. That's why it took a bit of time. I would go sometimes three months without recording. But you know what they say: When you're uninspired, the best thing is to do other things."

== Promotion ==
The lead single, "Clout", was released on 10 August 2020 for digital download. A music video was released on the same day directed by Charli Di Placido, recreating iconic album covers for various hip hop albums, such as Doggystyle by Snoop Dogg, Stillmatic by Nas and Get Rich or Die Tryin' by 50 Cent. The second single, "Airplane Mode" featuring NSG, was released on 20 August 2020 alongside a music video.

The release of official merchandise for Crabs in a Bucket was also released alongside the CD copy on 28 August 2020 via Warner Music & Nines' official site.

A short film written and directed by Nines titled after the album was released on 27 August 2020.

== Critical reception ==
Professional ratings
Review scores
Source	Rating
Clash	8/10
Evening Standard	4/5 stars
Pitchfork	7.0/10

Crabs in a Bucket received positive reviews from critics. For Clash, Tochi Imo complimented Nines' consistency in his musical approach: "Whilst greater experimentation would've been met with appreciation, one of Nines' most notable characteristics is his ability to stay true to his experiences despite growing commercial success, so I can’t be disappointed with a tape that exudes such authenticity. Although the whole album has clear themes, each track tells a story of its own and here, Nines anchors himself as one of the UK's best storytellers."

== Commercial performance ==
In the chart week ending 4 September 2020, Crabs in a Bucket debuted at number 1 on the UK Albums Chart. It was the most streamed and most downloaded album of the chart week, overtaking the midweek chart topper S&M2 by Metallica in the final day of sales by 2,000 units. The album was involved in a tight chart race that ended with 5,000 sale units between the top five. The peak consolidated Nines as one of the few UK rappers to achieve a number one album, alongside Tinie Tempah, Stormzy, Dave, Plan B, The Streets and J Hus.

== Track listing ==
Crabs in a Bucket track listing
No.	Title	Writer(s)	Producer(s)	Length
1.	"Intro"	Courtney Freckleton; Jabari Voss	Jabari on the Beat; Stan Sono; V3ry Rich; Flow Clark	2:26
2.	"Energy" (featuring Skrapz)	Freckleton; Christopher Kyei; Jahmori Simmons; Obi Ebele; Uche Ebele	Da Beatfreakz	3:16
3.	"Clout"	Freckleton; Reuben Wilford	1st Born	2:36
4.	"Realist" (featuring Nafe Smallz and Funds)	Freckleton; Carlos Corrodus; Nathan Adans; Quincy Ferreira	Quincy Tellem	2:42
5.	"Monster"	Freckleton; Wilford	1st Born	2:44
6.	"Airplane Mode" (featuring NSG)	Freckleton; Amir Amor; Kwame Kwei-Armah; Leon Rolle; Piers Aggett; Kesi Dryden	Kz; Rudimental	3:58
7.	"NIC" (featuring Tiggs da Author)	Freckleton; Adam Simon; Ellis Taylor	Show N Prove	3:41
8.	"Don't Change" (featuring NorthSideBenji)	Freckleton; Jadin Watson; Paul Oseh	Karlos	2:50
9.	"Lights" (featuring Louis Rei)	Freckleton; Oseh; Louis-Rae Beadle	Karlos	2:23
10.	"Monet Ain't a Thing" (featuring Roy Woods)	Freckleton; Ferriera; Denzel Spencer; Sean Gardner; Pahuldip Sandhu	Quincy Tellem; Sean Murdz; Steel Banglez	3:19
11.	"Ringaling" (featuring Headie One and Odeal)	Freckleton; Sandhu; Irving Adjei; Hillary Udanoh; Keven Wolfsohn; Paul Goller	Steel Banglez; The Elements	2:51
12.	"Flavours"	Freckleton; Giorgia Mullard; Henrique Carvalhal; Nana Agyemang)	N2theA	3:01
13.	"Flex" (featuring NorthSideBenji and Reid B2WN)	Freckleton; Jadin Watson; Navayii Michael; Ruben Vilone; Sam Reid	Ruby Retro; The Young Nav Michael	3:44
14.	"Stalker Interlude" (featuring Cherrie)	Freckleton; Ariowa Irosognie; Eyobed Getachew; Shiriihan Abdulle	EY	3:07
15.	"Movie Knights"	Freckleton; Lord Camacho; Marlon Nicholas	Lord Kimo; M.O. on the Beats	2:57
16.	"All Stars 2" (featuring Clavish, Frosty, Q2T and Chappo CSB)	Freckleton; Asharn Williams; Cillian Wright; Harri Williams; Johnathan Barton; Reiss Williams; Theo Beckford	Harrijay; Sxber Sounds	4:11
17.	"Outro"	Freckleton; Alessandro Pinto; Tomasso Pinto	DopeBoyzMusic	3:10
Total length:				52:56

Sample credits

- "Don't Change" contains a sample of "Don't Change", written by Eric McCaine, Athena Cage, Lavonn Battle and Tabitha Duncan, and performed by Kut Klose.

== Personnel ==
- Nines – vocals
- Frank 'Maestro' Yamoah - Engineering (Dubai/Spain)
- Adam Lunn – Engineering, mixing
- Jay Reynolds – Mixing (all tracks except "Intro"), additional production ("Airplane Mode")
- Christopher Hewitt – Mixing Assistant (all tracks except "Intro"), Vocal Engineer ("Ringaling")
- Kevin Tuffy - Mastering

== Charts ==
Chart performance for Crabs in a Bucket
Chart (2020)	Peak position
Irish Albums (OCC)	26
Scottish Albums (OCC)	76
UK Albums (OCC)	1

== Certifications ==
Certifications for Crabs in a Bucket
Region	Certification	Certified units/sales
United Kingdom (BPI)	Gold	100,000^{‡}
^{‡} Sales+streaming figures based on certification alone.

== Release history ==
Region	Date	Format	Label
Various	28 August 2020	Digital download; streaming	Zino; Warner
Various	28 August 2020	CD	Zino; Warner
