= Quit While You're Ahead =

Studio album by Nines
- Released: 27 September 2024
- Length: 43:56
- Label: Zino
- Producers: Aaron Goedluck; Cardo; Chrxs; ElementZ; GX; Jacob Manson; JB Productionz; JC3; Jungle; Karlos; KVXI; Kyle Evans; Maschine Man Tim; Mev The Renegade; Michelin Shin; Mike Allure; Mo on The Beat; RQ; Show N Prove; Soldado; Steel Banglez; Swifta Beater; Tekilla; Tom French

Nines chronology
Crop Circle 3 (2023)	Quit While You're Ahead (2024)

Singles from Quit While You're Ahead
- 1. "Tony Soprano 3" Released: 13 September 2024; 2. "Going Crazy" Released: 26 September 2024

Quit While You're Ahead is the sixth and final studio album by British rapper Nines, released on 27 September 2024, through Nines' own independent record label, Zino Records. It features guest appearances from Bee-Gee, Bellah, Chy Cartier, Fatz, Gappy Ranks, Henkie T, J Styles, K-Trap, Marnz Malone, NorthSideBenji, Rimzee, RM, Shocktown, Skrapz, Streetz, and Zino, while the album's production was handled by JB Productionz, Cardo, Jacob Manson, Jungle, Show N Prove, RQ, JC3, Steel Banglez, and several other producers. The album serves as a follow-up to Nines' fifth, Crop Circle 3 (2023) and was released alongside the film Crop Circle Farm.

== Release and promotion ==
On 13 September 2024, Nines released the album's lead single, "Tony Soprano 3". The single was produced by JC3, and RQ; it debuted at number 47 on the UK singles chart. Alongside the release of the single, Nines announced the release of the album, Quit While You're Ahead, stating that it'd be his last release, officially confirming his retirement from music. He also announced a concert date for November 27, at The O2 Arena. Just days prior to the release of the album, on September 24, Nines shared the album's tracklist on his Instagram. On September 26, the night of the album's release, he shared the official music video for "Going Crazy".

== Critical reception ==
Professional ratings
Review scores
Source	Rating
The Daily Telegraph	4/5 stars

Thomas Hobbs for The Daily Telegraph wrote in a positive review that throughout the album, there's "enviable experimentation" and that on the project, "[Nines] reveals he’s actually just moved from the black market to the legal drug trade". Hobbs wrote that on the record, Nines "project[s] hyper-confidence and, amid synths". Despite noting that he believes that Nines will return despite his retirement, he stated that "Nines solidifies his place as one of UK rap’s greatest ever storytellers".

== Track listing ==
Quit While You're Ahead track listing
No.	Title	Writer(s)	Producer(s)	Length
1.	"Intro"	Courtney Freckleton	Karlos; Mo on the Beat	2:02
2.	"Champagne Problems" (with Skrapz)	Freckleton; Christopher Kyei	Show N Prove^{[a]}; Jacob Manson^{[a]}	2:10
3.	"Cocoa Butter" (with J Styles and Rimzee)	Freckleton; Jordan Lindsay; Ricardo Miles-Fuller	Aaron Goedluck^{[a]}; GX^{[a]}; Mev the Renegade^{[a]}; Soldado^{[a]}	2:50
4.	"Going Crazy"	Freckleton	Karlos; Jacob Manson^{[a]}	2:57
5.	"Millions" (with NorthSideBenji)	Freckleton; Jaiden Watson	Chrxs^{[a]}; Tom French^{[a]}	1:48
6.	"Pray for Me" (with Bellah)	Freckleton; Isobel Akpobire	Show N Prove^{[a]}; Kyle Evans^{[a]}	2:13
7.	"Tony Soprano 3"	Freckleton	JC3^{[a]}; RQ^{[a]}	3:35
8.	"Cap"	Freckleton	JB Productionz	2:41
9.	"Johnny Cage" (with K-Trap and ShockTown)	Freckleton; Devonte Perkins; ShockTown	Karlos^{[a]}; Michelin Shin^{[a]}	2:15
10.	"Cold Hearted World 3" (with Marnz Malone)	Freckleton; Kimani Shaw	Mike Allure	3:34
11.	"Don't Cry" (with BeeGee and Zino)	Freckleton; BeeGee; Zino	KVXI^{[a]}; Tekilla^{[a]}	2:58
12.	"Circles"	Freckleton	JB Productionz; ElementZ^{[a]}; Steel Banglez^{[a]}; Swifta Beater^{[a]}	2:45
13.	"Line of Fire Pt. 9" (with J Styles, Chy Cartier, RM, Fatz, Streetz, Henkie T)	Freckleton; Lindsay; Chyna Dacrie; Rehmel Mendes; Fatz; Streetz; Henk Mando	JB Productionz	4:24
14.	"Gran Turismo"	Freckleton	Cardo^{[a]}	2:56
15.	"Drug Dealer Poetry"	Freckleton	Jungle	2:30
16.	"Outro" (with Gappy Ranks)	Freckleton; Jacob Williams	Maschine Man Tim	2:18
Total length:				43:56

Notes

- ^{^[a]} signifies a co-producer

== Charts ==
Chart performance for Quit While You're Ahead
Chart (2024)	Peak position
Irish Albums (Official Charts)	19
Scottish Albums (Official Charts)	13
UK Albums (Official Charts)	4
UK R&B Albums (Official Charts)	1

== Certifications ==
Certifications for Quit While You're Ahead
Region	Certification	Certified units/sales
United Kingdom (BPI)	Silver	60,000^{‡}
^{‡} Sales+streaming figures based on certification alone.
