= Mist (rapper) =

British rapper

- Born: Rhys Thomas Sylvester; 2 March 1992 (age 34); Birmingham, England
- Genres: British hip hop; grime; drum and bass
- Occupation: Rapper
- Years active: 2015–present
- Labels: Warner Bros. Records; Sickmade Records

Rhys Thomas Sylvester (born Monday 2 March 1992), known professionally as Mist (stylised as MIST), is a British rapper from Birmingham. His second EP, Diamond in the Dirt, was released in February 2018 and peaked at number 5 on the UK Albums Chart.

== Early life ==
Mist was born Rhys Thomas Sylvester on 2 March 1992 in Birmingham, England. His father hails from Trinidad and Tobago and his mother is a native of Saint Vincent and the Grenadines. His father was a guitarist in a band that at one point appeared on Top of the Pops. At a young age, he began taking an interest in rap music, and would listen to Busta Rhymes, The Notorious B.I.G., Snoop Dogg, and Puff Daddy as a child. After his older brother moved out of the house, Sylvester moved into his bedroom and began experimenting with his music equipment, making beats and writing some of his own rhymes to go with them. He was in trouble with the law during his youth for robbery, though he claims he was not involved with gang life as he and his friends were more interested in cars and motorbike riding.

== Career ==
After his release from prison in 2015, Mist began pursuing a career in music, releasing his first freestyles to YouTube, through a channel called P110, in June that year. His debut EP, M I S to the T, was released in September 2016. It broke into the UK charts, peaking at number 75. Shortly after, Mist was signed to Warner Bros. Records and given his own imprint, Sickmade Ent. Throughout 2016 and 2017, he released a number of singles through the label, including "Madness", "Hot Property" and "Marijuana" featuring Chip. "Madness" was certified Silver by the British Phonographic Industry (BPI) in 2022.

In February 2018, Mist released his second EP, Diamond in the Dirt, featuring collaborations with MoStack, Nines, and Not3s. The EP peaked at number 4 on the UK Albums Chart and remained on the chart for 6 weeks. Three songs from the EP also entered the UK Singles Chart; "Wish Me Well" featuring Jessie Ware, which peaked at number 73, "On It" featuring Nines, which peaked at number 66, and "Game Changer", which peaked at number 35. "Game Changer" was certified Silver by the BPI in 2021.

Mist also has a song with Sidhu Moose Wala and Conna "Three Chainz" Haines.

== Personal life ==
Mist has mentioned in his music that he has a daughter. He has also clarified that both of his parents died prior to his pursuit of a music career.

Mist is an avid supporter of Manchester United.

== Legal issues ==
In March 2012, Mist was fined £80 for possession of marijuana and sentenced to probation. In 2014, he was involved in a police chase on the M6 after he was caught driving without a license and was sentenced to 14 months in prison on 1 October after admitting dangerous driving and using a vehicle while uninsured.

== Discography ==
=== Studio albums ===
- Redemption (2023)

=== Extended plays ===
- M I S to the T (2016)
- Diamond in the Dirt (2018)

== Boxing record ==
=== Professional ===
| 4 fights | 4 wins | 0 losses |
|---|---|---|
| By knockout | 4 | 0 |

| No. | Result | Record | Opponent | Type | Round, time | Date | Location | Notes |
|---|---|---|---|---|---|---|---|---|
| 1 | Win | 1–0 | Ryan Taylor | KO | 1 (4) 2:32 | 11 May 2024 | Troxy, London, England | MF-Professional bout |
