= Let's Shut Up & Dance =

Single by Jason Derulo, Lay & NCT 127
- Language: English
- Released: February 22, 2019
- Studio: Doobdoob (Seoul); Gaenari Sound (Seoul); InGrid (Seoul)
- Genre: Dance-pop
- Length: 3:28
- Label: 7SIX9 Entertainment; Kakao M
- Songwriter(s): Anthony Clemons Jr; Jason Derulo; Uforo Ebongo; Ray Keys; Ali Prawl; Robot Scott
- Producer(s): Ray Keys; Uforo Ebongo; Ali Prawl; Robot Scott

Jason Derulo singles chronology
"Make Up" (2018)	"Let's Shut Up & Dance" (2019)	"Mamacita" (2019)

Lay singles chronology
"When It's Christmas" (2018)	"Let's Shut Up & Dance" (2019)	"Lovebird" (2019)

NCT 127 singles chronology
"Wakey-Wakey" (2019)	"Let's Shut Up & Dance" (2019)	"Superhuman" (2019)

Music video
- "Let's Shut Up & Dance" on YouTube

"Let's Shut Up & Dance" is a song by American singer Jason Derulo, Chinese singer Lay and South Korean boy group NCT 127. It was released as a single on February 22, 2019, by 7SIX9 Entertainment and distributed by Kakao M.

== Background ==
The collaboration and the song title was first announced on August 29, 2018, after SM Entertainment confirmed Lay and NCT 127's coinciding with the 60th anniversary of Michael Jackson.

In an interview with Billboard in March 2019, Derulo said, "I was so excited about this collaboration, We come from totally different worlds, but I really, really love their talent."

== Music video ==
A music video to accompany the release of "Let's Shut Up & Dance" was first released onto YouTube on February 21, 2019.

== Charts ==
Chart performance for "Let's Shut Up & Dance"
Chart (2019)	Peak position
China (China Top 100)	35
South Korean Albums (Gaon) (Note: The physical version of "Let's Shut Up & Dance" charted on the Gaon Album Chart.)	32
New Zealand Hot Singles (RMNZ)	34

== Release history ==
Release history and formats for "Let's Shut Up & Dance"
Region	Date	Format	Label	Ref.
Various	February 22, 2019	Digital download; streaming	7SIX9; Kakao M	
Various	March 1, 2019	CD	7SIX9; Kakao M	
