= Diamond in the Dirt (EP) =

EP by Mist
- Released: 9 February 2018
- Recorded: 2017–2018
- Genre: Hip hop; Grime
- Length: 24:45
- Label: Warner Bros. Records; Sickmade
- Producer: Mist (exec.); (also co-exec.)Steel Banglez; Swifta Beater; Zeph Ellis; Hazard

Mist chronology
M I S to the T (2016)	Diamond in the Dirt (2018)	Redemption (2023)

Singles from Diamond in the Dirt
- 1. "Game Changer" Released: 8 February 2018; 2. "On It" Released: 22 February 2018; 3. "Wish Me Well" Released: 22 February 2018

Diamond in the Dirt is the second extended play (EP) by English rapper Mist. It was released on 9 February 2018 through Warner Bros. Records and Sickmade Ent. It marks Mist's second full length project following his debut EP M I S to the T in September 2016. It features production from frequent collaborator Steel Banglez, and guest appearances from Nines, Not3s, Jessie Ware and Mostack, among others.

== Chart performance ==
Diamond in the Dirt entered the UK Album Chart on February 22, 2018, peaking at number 4 and staying on the chart for 6 weeks. Three songs from the EP also entered the UK Singles Chart; "Wish Me Well" featuring Jessie Ware, which peaked at number 73, "On It" featuring Nines, which peaked at number 66, and "Game Changer", which peaked at number 35.

== Music videos ==
3 music videos have been filmed for this project: "Game Changer", "Wish Me Well" and "Moshpit", which can all be found on Mist's YouTube channel.

== Track listing ==
All tracks mixed by Jay Reynolds

Credits adapted from Genius.

No.	Title	Writer(s)	Producer(s)	Length
1.	"Dreams to Reality"	Rhys Shlvester; Govinder Beesla	Steel Banglez	1:17
2.	"On It" (featuring Nines)	Sylvester; Courtney Freckleton	Steel Banglez	3:31
3.	"Uber" (featuring MoStack)	Sylvester; Montell Daley	Steel Banglez; Swifta Beater; Zeph Ellis	2:08
4.	"Game Changer"	Sylvester; Beesla	Steel Banglez	2:55
5.	"Wish Me Well" (featuring Jessie Ware)	Sylvester; Jessica Ware	Hazard	2:50
6.	"Display Skills" (featuring Mr Eazi and Fekky)	Sylvester; Fekky; Oluwatosin Ajibade; Beesla	Steel Banglez	3:12
7.	"Fountian" (featuring Haile)	Sylvester; Haile; Beesla	Hazard	3:25
8.	"Order It In" (featuring Not3s)	Sylvester; Lukman Odunaike	Steel Banglez	3:14
9.	"Moshpit" (featuring MoStack and Swifta Beater)	Sylvester; Montell Daley	Swifta Beater	2:13
Total length:				24:45
