= Too Hot (Jason Derulo song) =

Single by Jason Derulo
- Released: August 27, 2019
- Length: 2:38
- Label: Warner
- Songwriters: Andrew Morris; Everton Bonner; Ian Devaney; Jacob Manson; Jason Desrouleaux; John Taylor; Lisa Stansfield; Lloyd Willis; Sly Dunbar
- Producer: Jacob Manson

Jason Derulo singles chronology
"Mamacita" (2019)	"Too Hot" (2019)	"Savage Love (Laxed – Siren Beat)" (2020)

"Too Hot" is a song by American singer Jason Derulo. It was released as a single on August 27, 2019, by Warner Records. The song was written by Andrew Morris, Everton Bonner, Ian Devaney, Jacob Manson, Jason Desrouleaux, John Taylor, Lisa Stansfield, Lloyd Willis and Sly Dunbar.

The track is built heavily on an interpolation of the reggae song “Murder She Wrote” (1992) by Chaka Demus & Pliers, which was also used in Pitbull’s hit song “El Taxi” (2014).

== Music video ==
A music video to accompany the release of "Too Hot" was first released onto YouTube on September 3, 2019. The music video was directed by Derulo and was filmed in Los Angeles.

== Personnel ==
- Jacob Manson – producer, bass, guitar, writer
- Chris Gehringer – mastering
- Julián Vázquez – mixing
- Jason Derulo – vocals, writer
- Andrew Morris – writer
- Everton Bonner – writer
- Ian Devaney – writer
- John Taylor – writer
- Lisa Stansfield – writer
- Lloyd Willis – writer
- Sly Dunbar – writer

== Charts ==
Chart performance for "Too Hot"
Chart (2019)	Peak position
Belgium (Ultratip Bubbling Under Wallonia)	32

== Release history ==
Release history for "Too Hot"
Region	Date	Format	Label	Ref.
Various	August 27, 2019	Digital download; streaming	Warner	
