= Jacob Manson =

British songwriter and record producer

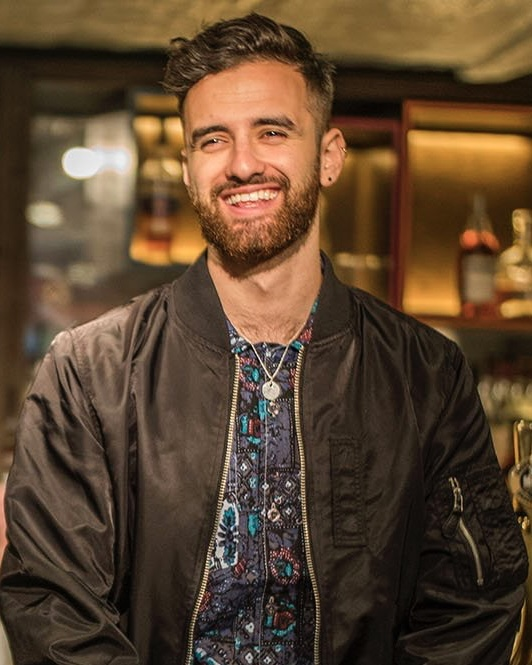
- Manson in 2015

Background information
- Also known as: Blonde (duo)
- Born: Jacob Manson; Bristol, England, United Kingdom.
- Genres: Dance music; hip-hop; pop
- Occupations: DJ; songwriter; multi-instrumentalist; record producer
- Instruments: piano; keyboards; guitar; bass; drums
- Years active: 2013–present
- Formerly of: Blonde (duo)
- Education: University of Leeds (BA)

Jacob Manson is a British songwriter, record producer and DJ. He is best known as one half of the electronic music duo Blonde, whose singles "I Loved You" (featuring Melissa Steel) and "All Cried Out" (featuring Alex Newell) charted in the UK top 10 and received BPI Platinum certification.

As a songwriter and producer outside Blonde, Manson has contributed to 9 top 10 records and has credits with artists including Ed Sheeran, David Guetta and Jason Derulo, as well as frequent collaborations with Elderbrook and Nines. In July 2025, he co-wrote "Dior" by MK featuring Chrystal, which reached number one on the UK Singles Chart for two weeks as well as an 11 week stay in the top 10. In 2024, "Messy in Heaven" by venbee and Goddard.—which Manson co-produced— charted at #3 in the UK and was nominated for the BRIT Award for Song of the Year with Mastercard.

== Discography ==
=== With Blonde ===
Title	Year	Peak chart positions								Certifications	Album
Title	Year	UK	UK Dance	AUT	BEL (FL)	GER	IRE	SCO	SWI	Certifications	Album
"Foolish" (featuring Ryan Ashley)	2014	—	—	—	82	—	—	—	—		Non-album singles
"Higher Ground" (featuring Charli Taft)	2014	—	—	—	—	—	—	—	—		Non-album singles
"I Loved You" (featuring Melissa Steel)	2014	7	5	60	31	25	65	10	56	BPI: Platinum	Non-album singles
"All Cried Out" (featuring Alex Newell)	2015	4	1	—	59	—	74	4	—	BPI: Platinum	Non-album singles
"Feel Good (It's Alright)" (featuring Karen Harding)	2015	76	19	—	99	—	—	50	—		Non-album singles
"Nothing Like This" (with Craig David)	2016	15	5	—	94	—	34	—	—	BPI: Platinum	Following My Intuition
"Don't Need No Money" (Imani featuring Sigala and Blonde)	2016	67	22	—	—	—	77	—	—		Non-album single
"Just for One Night" (featuring Astrid S)	2017	—	—	—	—	—	—	—	—		Non-album single
"Me, Myself & I" (featuring Bryn Christopher)	2018	—	—	—	—	—	—	—	—		Non-album single
"—" denotes a single that did not chart or was not released.

=== Select Production and Songwriting Discography ===
Title	Year	Artist(s)	Credits	Produced With	Peak Chart Position (UK)	Certification	Album
"Lay It All on Me" (ft. Ed Sheeran)	2015	Rudimental	Co-writer		12	BPI: Platinum, RIAA Platinum, ARIA 2× Platinum	We the Generation
"Just My Type"	2018	The Vamps	Co-writer/Producer		-		Night & Day
"Answerphone" (ft. Ella Eyre & Yxng Bane)	2018	Banx & Ranx	Co-writer		5	BPI: Platinum	Non-album single
"Somebody Like Me" (ft. AJ Tracey)	2018	Craig David	Co-writer/Producer/Mixer		-		The Time Is Now
"Used to Love You"	2018	Anne-Marie	Co-Producer	Fraser T. Smith, Lostboy	-		Speak Your Mind
"Hooked"	2018	Why Don't We	Co-writer/Producer		-		8 Letters
"I Don't Belong In This Club (ft. Macklemore)"	2019	Why Don't We	Co-writer/Producer		-	RIAA: Gold	TBA
"Too Hot"	2019	Jason Derulo	Co-writer/Producer		-		Non-album single
"F It Up"	2019	Jason Derulo	Co-writer/Producer		-		"2Sides (Side 1)"
"Talk About Us (ft. Stefflon Don"	2019	Jason Derulo	Co-writer/Producer		-		"2Sides (Side 1)"
"Walls"	2020	Louis Tomlinson	Co-writer		-		Walls
"Houdini" (ft. Swarmz and Tion Wayne)	2020	KSI	Co-writer/Producer	AJProductions	6	BPI: Silver	Dissimulation
"Numb"	2020	Elderbrook	Additional Production		-		Why Do We Shake in the Cold?
"Why Do We Shake in the Cold?"	2020	Elderbrook	Co-Producer/Mixer	Totally Enormous Extinct Dinosaurs	-		Why Do We Shake in the Cold?
"All My Love"	2020	Elderbrook	Co-Writer/Producer		-		Why Do We Shake in the Cold?
"I'm A Fool"	2020	Elderbrook	Co-Writer/Co-Producer	Joel Pott, Elderbrook	-		Why Do We Shake in the Cold?
"Down By The Bay"	2020	Elderbrook	Co-Writer/Producer/Mixer		-		Why Do We Shake in the Cold?
"Take A Minute"	2020	Elderbrook	Co-Producer		-		Why Do We Shake in the Cold?
"Back To My Bed"	2020	Elderbrook	Co-Producer		-		Why Do We Shake in the Cold?
"Set Fire To My Gun"	2020	Elderbrook	Co-Producer		-		Why Do We Shake in the Cold?
"Next December"	2020	Elderbrook	Co-Writer/Producer		-		Why Do We Shake in the Cold?
"Kein Hunger (ft. Ufo361))"	2020	Loredana	Co-Producer/Co-Writer		9 (Germany)		Medusa
"Interest (ft. Ms Banks & Oxlade)”	2021	Dolapo	Co-producer	AJProductions	9 (U.K. Afrobeats Chart)		TBA
"Manchester Super Reds No.1 Fan”	2021	Don Broco	Co-Writer/Co-Producer		-		Amazing Things
"Frost”	2021	Tomorrow X Together	Co-Writer/Producer		-		TBA
"Gang Gang (ft. Jay1 & Deno (singer))”	2021	KSI	Co-Writer/Producer		40		All Over the Place
"Wasted (Digga D song) (ft. ArrDee)”	2021	Digga D	Co-Writer/Producer		6	BPI: Gold	TBA
“BMW"	2022	Bad Boy Chiller Crew	Additional Production		7	BPI: Gold	TBA
“Come & Go”	2022	ArrDee	Production		16		“Pier Pressure”
“Fuego”	2022	Aitch (rapper)	Co-Production/Co-Writer	Whyjay			Close to Home
“The Palm”	2022	Aitch (rapper)	Co-Production/Co-Writer	Whyjay & Litek			Close to Home
“Messy in Heaven”	2022	Venbee & Goddard	Co-Production		3	BPI: Platinum	TBA
“ILY2”	2022	NewDad	Producer				TBA
"I Need You"	2023	Elderbrook	Co-Writer/Producer				Little Love
“Calendar”	2023	Nines	Co-Producer/Co-Writer				Crop Circle 2
“Only One ft. Skrapz & OURAA”	2023	Nines	Co-Producer/Co-Writer				Crop Circle 3
“Toxic ft. Bad Boy Chiller Crew”	2023	Nines	Co-Producer/Co-Writer				Crop Circle 3
“Never Be Me ft. Blade Brown”	2023	Nines	Co-Producer/Co-Writer				Crop Circle 3
“I Do ft. Tunde & Mugzz”	2023	Nines	Co-Producer/Co-Writer				Crop Circle 3
“Good Morning”	2023	Nines	Co-Producer/Co-Writer				Crop Circle 3
“Could of Been ft. Miraa May”	2023	Nines	Co-Producer/Co-Writer				Crop Circle 3
“Devil's Rejects ft. Skrapz & George The Poet”	2023	Nines	Co-Producer/Co-Writer				Crop Circle 3
“When We Were Young (The Logical Song) ft. Kim Petras”	2023	David Guetta	Co-Writer		51		TBA
"Places ft. Shimza"	2024	Elderbrook	Co-Writer/Producer				Another Touch
“Shallow Water”	2024	Elderbrook	Co-Writer/Producer				Another Touch
“Afters”	2024	Elderbrook	Co-Writer/Producer				Another Touch
“How Long”	2024	Elderbrook	Co-Writer/Producer				Another Touch
“Going Crazy”	2024	Nines	Producer/Co-Writer				Quit While You're Ahead
“Champagne Problems ft. Skrapz”	2024	Nines	Producer/Co-Writer				Quit While You're Ahead
"Dior ft. Chrystal"	2025	MK	Co-Writer/Producer		1	BPI Platinum	-
“Turn It Up”	2025	Marlon Hoffstadt	Producer & Co-Writer				TBA
