= Crop Circle 2 =

Studio album by Nines
- Released: 28 April 2023
- Length: 43:13
- Label: Zino; Warner
- Producer: Beat Butcha; Benji Benji; Danny Got That Juice; EY; Flo; GX; Jacob Manson; Jerome Williams; Karlos; Mansur Brown; Michelin Shin; Monro; Monte Booker; R14 Beats; Show N Prove; Sokari; Swifta

Nines chronology
| Crabs in a Bucket (2020) | Crop Circle 2 (2023) | Crop Circle 3 (2023) |

Singles from Crop Circle 2
- 1. "Tony Soprano 2" Released: 20 April 2023

Crop Circle 2 is the fourth studio album by English rapper Nines, released on 28 April 2023 by Zino and Warner Records. It features guest appearances from Skrapz, J Styles and Fatz of Ice City Boyz, Wretch 32, M Huncho, Potter Payper, Clavish, Nafe Smallz, Kojey Radical and Tiggs da Author. The album, which shares its name with a 2020 film made by Nines following his 2018 album Crop Circle, was preceded by the lead single "Tony Soprano 2".

== Critical reception ==
Professional ratings
Review scores
| Source | Rating |
|---|---|
| Clash | 8/10 |
| Evening Standard | 4/5 stars |
| Financial Times | 4/5 stars |
| Mic Cheque | 7.5/10 |

Reviewing the album for Clash, Shanté Collier-McDermott felt that Crop Circle 2 "establishes Nines as the authentic talent fans love him for. He's grounded, able to casually flex his accomplishments, and this project signs off with him basking in a different lifestyle". She ultimately found that the album is "circular in nature" and "fuelled by continuation", with its "rolling instrumentals and narration encompassing an earlier era of his artistry in a fine-tuned way". David Smyth of the Evening Standard wrote that Nines's "deadpan, unshowy delivery makes his words entirely believable and all the more startling", and that his "smooth production that foregrounds melody brings him closer to pop than his lyrics ought to allow". Ludovic Hunter-Tilney of the Financial Times opined that the album "resembles The Godfather Part II, a tale of trying to go straight", with Nines "present[ing] himself as getting too old for the criminal life rather than atoning for it". Hunter-Tilney concluded that "Nines and his producers have done an impressive job here".

=== Year-end lists ===
Select year-end rankings of Crop Circle 2
| Publication | List | Rank | Ref. |
|---|---|---|---|
| Complex UK | Complex UK's Best Albums of 2023 | 6 | |

== Commercial performance ==
Crop Circle 2 placed at number three on the midweek UK Albums Chart dated 1 May 2023, debuting at number two on the final chart published on 5 May 2023.

== Track listing ==
Crop Circle 2 track listing
| No. | Title | Writer(s) | Producer(s) | Length |
|---|---|---|---|---|
| 1. | "Intro" | Courtney Freckleton; Ellis Taylor | Show N Prove | 2:12 |
| 2. | "Highly Blessed" (featuring Wretch 32 and Skrapz) | Freckleton; Jermaine Scott; Christopher Kyei; Jerome Williams | Jerome Williams | 3:25 |
| 3. | "Favela" (featuring J Styles) | Freckleton; Jordan Lindsay; Ayo Simpson; Taylor | Flyo | 2:21 |
| 4. | "Calendar" (with Aisa) | Freckleton; Taylor; Jacob Manson; Beyoncé Knowles; Robert Williams; Nija Charles; Ozan Yildirim; Robert Waller; Scott Storch; Andrew Franklin; Austin Schindler; Ella Howell; Eyobed Getachew | Show N Prove; Jacob Manson | 3:14 |
| 5. | "Nothing Like Me" (featuring M Huncho) | Freckleton; Mujtaba Khan; Eyobed Getachew; Paul Oseh; Mansur Brown | E.Y.; Karlos; Mansur Brown | 2:26 |
| 6. | "Weedman" (featuring Lylo Gold) | Freckleton; Lylo Gold; Ahmanti Booker | Monte Booker | 2:28 |
| 7. | "Tony Soprano 2" | Freckleton; Swifta; Benjamin Miller | Swifta; Benji Miller | 3:50 |
| 8. | "What's Beef" (featuring Potter Payper) | Freckleton; Jamel Bousbaa; R14 Beats | R14 Beats; TN; Apo | 2:48 |
| 9. | "Different League" (featuring Clavish and Nafe Smallz) | Freckleton; Cian Wright; Nathan Adams; Donovan Hardie | PabloMCR | 4:07 |
| 10. | "Wrist Watch / Prayed for This" | Freckleton; Oseh; Gregory Matta; Michelin Shin; Wayne Henderson; Willie Harris | Karlos | 2:37 |
| 11. | "F**k the Worl" (featuring Kojey Radical and Tiggs da Author) | Freckleton; Kwadwo Amponsah; Adam Simon; Taylor; Eliot Dubock | Show N Prove; Beat Butcha | 2:31 |
| 12. | "Line of Fire Pt. 6" (featuring Fatz, J Styles, Little Torment and Streetz) | Freckleton; Taylor; Oseh | Show N Prove; Karlos | 4:35 |
| 13. | "Letter to Hydro Interlude" | Freckleton; Taylor | Show N Prove | 1:43 |
| 14. | "Hear Me Out" | Freckleton; Dan Cordero; Darrin Chandler; Bob James; Dinky Bingham; Ewart Dewgarde; Kenyatta Blake; Michael Bivins; Ronnie Devoe; Walter Dewgarde; Silky; Gottfried Nortey; Jeffery Dyson | DannyGotThatJuice; Prod GX | 2:17 |
| 15. | "Outro" | Freckleton; Rachel Moulden; Monro; Sorai | Monro; Sorai | 2:39 |
| Total length: | | | | 43:13 |

== Charts ==
Chart performance for Crop Circle 2
| Chart (2023) | Peak position |
|---|---|
| Irish Albums (OCC) | 15 |
| Scottish Albums (OCC) | 79 |
| UK Albums (OCC) | 2 |
| UK R&B Albums (OCC) | 1 |

== Certifications ==
| Region | Certification | Certified units/sales |
|---|---|---|
| United Kingdom (BPI) | Gold | 100,000^{‡} |
^{‡} Sales+streaming figures based on certification alone.
