= EGA Distro =

Music distribution company

EGA Distr
- Type: Subsidiary
- Industry: Music and entertainment
- Genre: Various
- Founded: 2010
- Founders: Charley Snook; Colin Batsa; Victor Omos
- Headquarters: London, United Kingdom
- Area served: Worldwide
- Parent: Virgin Music Group

EGA Distro is a British music distribution owned by Colin Batsa, Victor Omos and Charley Snook. The company is based in London and has distributed music for several artists, including D-Block Europe, Digga D, Nines, and several others.

== History ==
EGA Music Group was founded in 2010 by Colin Batsa and Victor Omos, with Charley Snook joining as an intern in 2012. In 2018, the company entered a partnership with Caroline Records.

In 2023, the company was relaunched as EGA Distro by Batsa with Snook and Omos in major roles. The company also announced a new partnership with Virgin Music Group, the company's primary distributor.

== Artists ==
- D-Block Europe
- Digga D
- K-Trap
- M Huncho
- Nines
- Potter Payper
- Sharna Bass
- Skrapz
- Twin S
