= Amia Brave =

British–Nigerian singer and songwriter

Amia Brave is a British–Nigerian R&B singer-songwriter. She is best known for her collaboration with British rapper Enny on hit single Peng Black Girls.

== Discography ==
=== Singles ===
- Young and Misguided (2020)
- Sweet Love (2020)
- Deja Vu (2021)

==== As featured artist ====
- Peng Black Girls – Enny ft. Amia Brave (2020)
- Lost Ones Found – Mike'o ft. Amia Brave (2020)
- Conversations With Darkness – Fred Fredas ft. Amia Brave (2020)
