= Gappy Ranks =

British recording artist

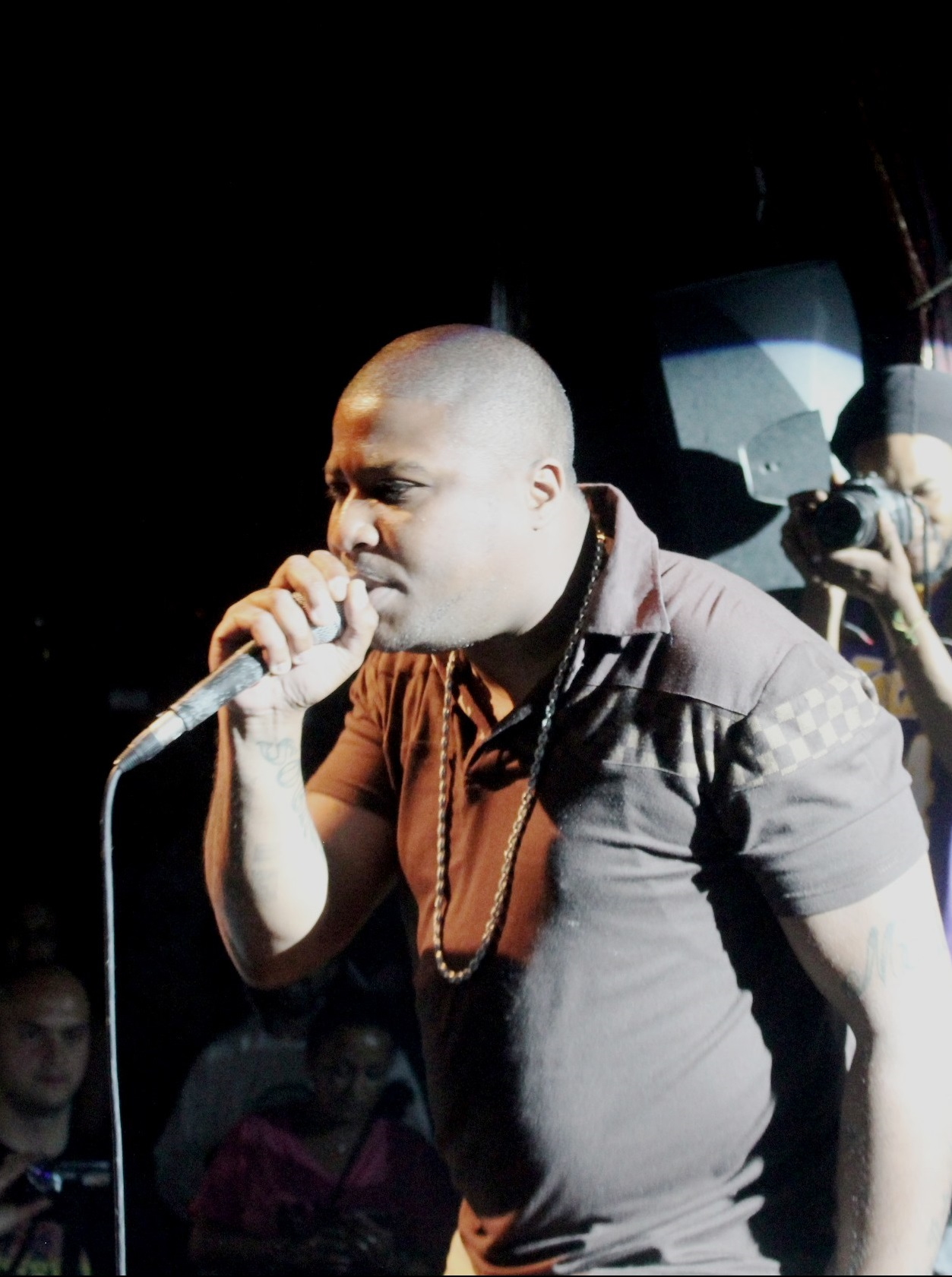

Background information
- Born: c.1983 Harlesden, London, England
- Genres: Dancehall
- Years active: 2002 – present
- Labels: Hot Coffee Music, Peckings, Greensleeves, VP

Jacob Lee Williams (born c.1983), better known as Gappy Ranks, is an English dancehall musician of Jamaican and Dominican descent, from Harlesden, London.

== Career ==
Born in Harlesden to a Jamaican father and Dominican mother, he dealt with numerous problems; including homelessness after leaving school. Once he overcame these issues, he joined up with childhood friend and fellow artist Redmann (UK), and was enlisted into the UK dancehall collective Suncycle, along with local artists such as Cash Money, Lady Chann and Naff Skrilla. Their first album titled Suncyle included Ranks' homage to his hometown, "Harlesden". Their second album I Am Somebody was released on the UK label Jamdown Records. Ranks left the group in 2004 and embarked on a solo career.

Nicknamed "Gappy" due to the gap between his front teeth, he initially worked under the name "Daddy Gappy", before opting for the Cutty Ranks-influenced "Gappy Ranks". In 2005, Gappy Ranks was featured on the Vice law entertainment mixtapes. That same year, he won the 'Best Song' award at London's Silk Awards for "Little Understanding", released by UK reggae record label Stingray Records. Also in 2005, Ranks contributed to the single "What We Do" by Kray Twinz featuring Twista and Lethal B, which charted nationally in the UK at #23. Ranks performed live at Earl's Court in front of a crowd of 17,000 for the first Kiss 100 awards. He also played a full UK tour which brought him to cities such as Manchester, Birmingham, and Newcastle. He recorded for former UK reggae giants Jet Star Records in North West London where he became an assistant engineer, giving him time to grow and develop his love for music and network which led him to work with record label Peckings.

On 26 December 2009, Ranks' childhood wish was granted, as he performed at the celebrated annual Sting event in Jamaica.

In January 2010, with the introduction from Silverstar Sound's DJ Gussy, Gappy Ranks joined forces with Pierre Bost; CEO of French record label Special Delivery. He began to tour across the world, starting with European countries such as: France, the Netherlands, Italy, Germany, and Switzerland. He signed a three-year deal with Greensleeves Records and in 2010, released his debut album Put the Stereo On on Greensleeves' Peckings subsidiary. Ranks was nominated for the 2010 MOBO Award in the 'Best Reggae Act' category, losing out to Gyptian.

In 2011, Ranks followed up with his second album Thanks & Praise, this time on his own Hot Coffee Music label, which was distributed by VPAL Music. Thanks & Praise included "Stinkin' Rich" (produced by Italian producer Macro Marco), "Longtime", (produced by Special Delivery) and the title track (produced by Grammy Award-winning UK producer Jazzwad) and featured Jamaican recording artists Delly Ranx and Russian, who is better known for his work with Vybz Kartel. Gappy Ranks has since toured and performed throughout Europe, the United States, the West Indies, and Australasia. His tour also included Japan and in March 2011, he found himself in the middle of the world's biggest earthquake and tsunami. The disaster killed over 20,000 people and Gappy Ranks recorded a tribute track titled, "I Was There". Ranks returned to the UK and was featured on BBC's Later...with Jools Holland, performing "Longtime" and "Heaven In Her Eyes". That same year, he opened an eighteen-date tour in California, Nevada, Oregon, and Washington for Collie Buddz. He has performed at legendary venues such as BB King's in New York, the Roxy theatre in Los Angeles, the Fillmore in San Francisco, and the Jazz Cafe in London. He has also been billed for worldwide festivals such as Summer Jam in Germany, the Glastonbury Festival in the UK, and Best of the Best in Miami.

Ranks has also acted as producer on a number of projects through his Hot Coffee Music label and has produced for recording artists such as Gyptian, Chino, Busy Signal, Delly Ranx, Bugle, Khago, Bramma, Laden, Bobby Hustle, JBoog, Chukki Star, Timeka Marshall, Torch Campbell, Exco Levi, Kim Kelly, and Reddman UK who Gappy Ranks signed to his label in 2011. In 2012, he self-produced his very own track "Wine Pon de Edge" and the "Throw Me Herbs" riddim which featured various artists as part of his Cookies EP collection. in November 2012 he headlined his own 16 date Cookies tour in the West Coast of the US, Canada, and Costa Rica, which was supported by Dynasty Records artist Bobby Hustle.

In 2013, Ranks performed at the Raggamuffin reggae festival in New Zealand, as well as his Cookies Reloaded tour 2013 of the East coast USA. June 2013 saw Gappy Ranks performing at the Sierra Nevada World Music Festival for the first time. On 17 September 2013, his third album Shining Hope was released. He collaborated with Beres Hammond on a new version of the latter's "I Surrender".

In June 2014, Gappy Ranks collaborated with New Zealand hip-hop producer P-Money on an eight-track EP titled The Baddest; The EP was recorded at Red Bull Music Academy in Auckland, New Zealand. Gappy Ranks' fourth album titled Generation was scheduled for release in April 2015.

== Discography ==
=== Albums ===
- English Weather (2006), Jet Star
- Put the Stereo On (2010), Greensleeves/VP
- Thanks & Praise (2011), Hot Coffee Music / VPAL Music
- Shining Hope (2013), Hot Coffee Music / VPAL Musuic
- Gappy Ranks Meets Dub Club (2014), Stones Throw
- Generation (2015)
- "Guide Me" (2016), Hot Coffee Music / VPAL Music
- "Pure Badness" (2017) Hot Coffee Music / VPAL Music
