= Marnz Malone =

British rapper

Kimani Shaw, known by his recording alias Marnz Malone, is a Jamaican-British rapper and songwriter based in Birmingham. His 2024 album, Tina's Boy, peaked at number 66 on the UK Albums Chart and at number 6 on the UK Hip Hop and R&B Albums Chart.

== Early life ==
Kimani Shaw was born in Spanish Town, Jamaica. At two years old, he and his mother moved to Aston, Birmingham following his father's death. At school, he was bullied for speaking Patois, leading him to become interested in English lessons.

== Legal issues ==
In 2021, Malone approached a rival gang with a gun before being stabbed twenty times. Following the incident, he was found guilty of possession of a firearm following a trial at Birmingham Crown Court. He was sentenced to 11 years in jail. Malone continued to write and release music while serving his sentence. On December 18th 2025, Malone was released from prison however he was deported back to Jamaica.

== Discography ==
=== Albums ===
- Yaqeen (2026) – No. 36 UK Albums Chart

=== Extended plays ===
List of extended plays, with selected details
Title	Year	Peak UK Albums	Peak UK Hip Hop
Trenchfoot	2022	—	—
Maktub	2022	—	—
Tina's Boy	2024	66	6
Sabr	2025	—	12
"—" denotes a recording that did not chart or was not released in that territory.

=== Singles ===
==== Guest appearances ====
Singles
Title	Artist	Year	Peak UK singles	Peak UK Hip Hop
"Cold Hearted World 3"	Nines / Marnz Malone	2024	65	23
