= Show N Prove =

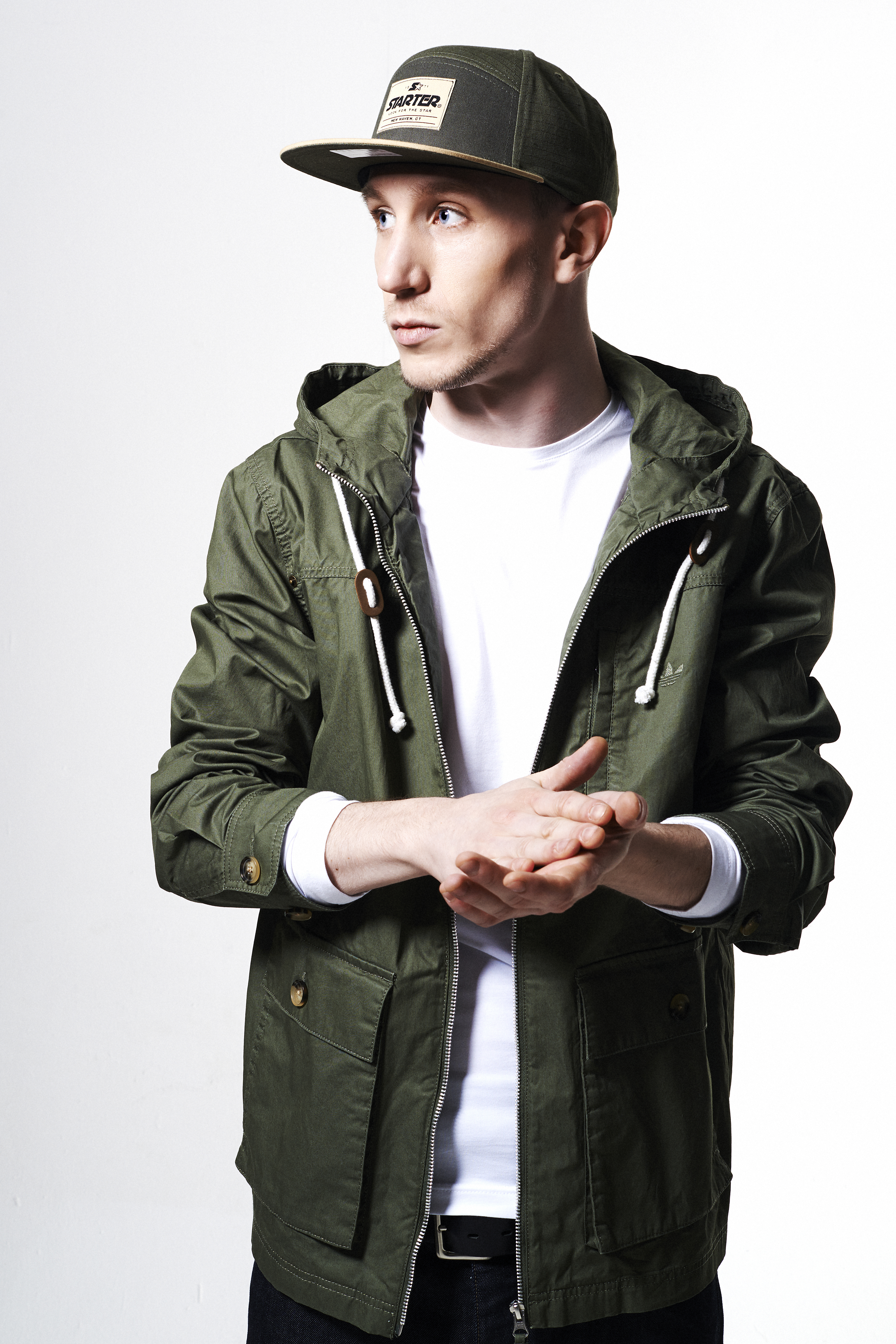
- Show N Prove

Background information
- Also known as: Show N Prove
- Born: Ellis Taylor; 26 December 1985 (age 40)
- Origin: Edinburgh, Scotland
- Occupations: Record Producer; Songwriter; DJ
- Years active: 2004 - Present
- Labels: XL Recordings; Concord
- Website: shownprove.com

Show N Prove, born Ellis Taylor, is a Scottish record producer, DJ and musical artist from Edinburgh, Scotland.

== Music production career ==
Show N Prove's career began when working with local acts in the Edinburgh hip hop scene in the early 2000s, where he received a breakthrough working with rapper Baby Blue by producing the track "Sometimes". This led to him moving to London where he worked with artists such as Rizzle Kicks, Tinchy Stryder, Wretch 32, Dappy and Benny Banks with whom he created his most successful work to date by producing the single "Bada Bing" which featured in the movie Fast & Furious 6 and appeared on the official soundtrack.

== DJing ==
Show N Prove started DJing at an early age and eventually began doing shows from the age of 14 around Edinburgh.

== Mixtape releases ==
Mixtape title	Artist	Release date
Instrumentals volume 3	Show N Prove	2014
Instrumentals volume 2	Show N Prove	2012
Instrumentals volume 1	Show N Prove	2011

== Film & TV ==
Cleaner (2025 film)	2025
All American (TV series)	2024
Power Book II: Ghost	2024
The Equalizer 3	2023
Top Boy	2022
Woke (TV series)	2020
Brittany Runs a Marathon	2019
Sicario 2	2018
Power (TV series)	2017
The Circle (2017 film)	2017
Girls Trip	2017
Dear White People	2017
Bridget Jones's Baby	2016
Shaun the Sheep Movie	2015
Quantico (TV series)	2015
Fast & Furious 6	2013

== Discography ==
=== 2025 ===
Song	Artist(s)	Year
Keys	D-Block Europe feat. Popcaan	2025
We're Not Losing	Slick Rick	2025
Without You	Eric Bellinger	2025
Drinking My Water	Kojey Radical feat. MNEK	2025
Rotation	Kojey Radical	2025
Love & Delight	Rizzle Kicks	2025
Last Cards – Outro	Krept & Konan feat. Michael Ward	2025
Forever	Say Now	2025
We Run This Glaze	Lady Leshurr	2025
B.A.B.Y	JayG x Show N Prove	2025
On The Radar Freestyle	Show Dem Camp	2025
On The Radar Freestyle	Catch	2025
Want It All	Catch	2025
The Come Up	AB	2025
Show Me	S Loud	2025

=== 2024 ===
Song	Artist(s)	Year
YGF	Pa Salieu	2024
Guava Riddim (Amina)	Tiggs Da Author	2024
Cold Cement	Ezi	2024
Pray for Me	Nines feat. Bellah	2024
Champagne Problems	Nines feat. Skrapz	2024
Sugar	Nippa × Show N Prove × Larry June	2024
Around the World	Nippa × Show N Prove	2024
Rain	Rimzee	2024
In Love with the Lizzy	Stay Flee Get Lizzy feat. Youngs Teflon, Tiny Boost	2024
Slippery Slope	Skrapz feat. Tiggs Da Author, M Huncho	2024
Reflection	Skrapz	2024
I'm Yours	Skrapz	2024
Marathon	Skrapz	2024
Marathon Continues	Skrapz feat. Kano	2024
Lies	Kwengface feat. Marnz Malone, Tiggs Da Author	2025
Twinning	Sam Wise feat. Tiggs Da Author	2025

=== 2023 ===
Song	Artist(s)	Year
Endless	Nasty C	2023
JESTEŚ POJ384NA	Mata	2023
Homesick	Finn Askew	2023
Trainspotting	Big Narstie feat. Laville	2023
Quarter Past 3	Fredo feat. Eric IV	2023
Scoreboard	Fredo feat. Tiggs Da Author	2023
Piano Pain	Tunde	2023
Tell the City	Jordan feat. Breal	2023
Big Bad IVD	Ivorian Doll	2023
Maddest Hoes	Nippa x Show N Prove	2023
Champagne Riddim	Tiggs Da Author feat. Potter Payper	2023
OCD Riddim (Part 2)	Tiggs Da Author feat. Rimzee, Wretch 32	2023
Max Elliot	Nines feat. Big Narstie, M Dot R	2023
I Do	Nines feat. Tunde, Mugzz	2023
Not Guilty	Nines feat. Tiggs Da Author, Mark Morrison	2023
Crop Circle 3 Intro	Nines	2023
Calendar	Nines	2023
Crop Circle 2 Intro	Nines	2023
F**k the Worl	Nines feat. Tiggs Da Author, Kojey Radical	2023
Letter to Hydro (Interlude)	Nines	2023

=== 2022 ===
Song	Artist(s)	Year
Dapper Dan	Lethal Bizzle feat. Giggs, A9Dbo Fundz	2022
The One	Nippa × Show N Prove	2022
Not a Statistic	Nippa × Show N Prove	2022
Where They At	Nippa × Show N Prove	2022
Danny Boy	Jordan feat. Maverick Sabre, Big Narstie	2022
27 Club	Jordan	2022
Tell Me Why	Jordan feat. Maverick Sabre	2022
The Emperor	YUNGBLUD	2022
Gangsteritus Part 2	Potter Payper feat. Tiggs Da Author, Nines	2022
Que	Lucho SSJ × Show N Prove	2022
Get Away	Smiler	2022
Thank You	Smiler	2022
Daily Duppy	Lethal Bizzle	2022
Neighbourhood Hero	Mowgs	2022
Your Type	Squeeks	2022
Braggin' Rights	Squeeks	2022
Circle of Life	NSJ Mali	2022
Feu En L'air	Seth Gueko feat. Lefa	2022
Money Moves	Kwengface feat. Haile	2022

=== 2021 ===
Song	Artist(s)	Year
Gangsteritus	Potter Payper feat. Tiggs Da Author	2021
Gangsteritus Part 2	Potter Payper feat. Tiggs Da Author, Nines	2021
Silly	KSI feat. Bugzy Malone	2021
Be Right Back	Skrapz	2021
Mona Lisa	Teeway	2021
Fly Em' High	Tiggs Da Author feat. Nines	2021
Fell in Love	LD feat. K-Trap, Rue Melo	2021
Free Smoke	LD feat. S Loud	2021
99 Problems	LD	2021
Booska Viking	Seth Gueko, Stos	2021
Ever Ever	Duchess	2021
Olé (We Are England)	Krept & Konan feat. Morrisson, M1llionz	2021
Scotland Cypher Pt. 1 & 2	DJ Prospect	2021
Lottery	S1lva	2021
First Day Out	LD	2021
Lucky	Raleigh Ritchie	2021
Stop Check's	S Loud	2021
Slang/Ebonics	Swiss	2021
L.O.V.E	Amos	2021

=== 2020 ===
Song	Artist(s)	Year
NIC	Nines feat. Tiggs Da Author	2020
In Your Head	Isabelle Brown	2020
Ms Rona	Lady Leshurr	2020
Lockdown	Lady Leshurr	2020
Quarantine Speech	Lady Leshurr	2020
Gimmie Space	Cadet feat. Chip	2020
Take the Wheel	Cadet	2020
Too Late for That	AWA feat. BJ the Chicago Kid	2020
Keep Up	Mowgs	2020
Trapstar Memoir's	Potter Payper	2020
Never	Snap Capone	2020
Westbrook	Cole LC feat. Adz	2020
Next Up	Adz	2020
Freestyle 2 (Dreams)	Cillian	2020
No Love Lost	Lenny Loso feat. Sly	2020
Christmas Freestyle	Jordan	2020
The Big Narstie Show Freestyle	Big Narstie	2020

=== 2019 ===
Song	Artist(s)	Year
Keep Talking	Krept & Konan, Stormzy, Cadet	2019
Boasy	Loski	2019
Kinshasa Riddim	Tiggs Da Author feat. Blade Brown	2019
Goat Flow	Lowkey	2019
41	Mowgs feat. Ess	2019
Outro	Mowgs	2019
I've Gotta Be Me	Lady Leshurr	2019
Damaged Goods	Lola Coca	2019
Plaza Riddim	Tiggs Da Author feat. K-Trap	2019
Man Don't Lie Riddim	Tiggs Da Author feat. Asco	2019
Gangsta Flex Riddim	Tiggs Da Author	2019
Fall	Seafret	2019
Noticing Me Now	Yizzy feat. Elshay	2019
Oh Please	SL feat. Tiggs Da Author	2019
Dirty Digits	LD feat. S Loud	2019
Link Up	Geko feat. Stefflon Don, Deno, Dappy	2019
The Jungle	Monkey feat. 67, LD, SJ, Tiny Boost	2019
Block's Hot	Blade Brown feat. Giggs	2019
6am	Blade Brown feat. Tiggs Da Author	2019

=== 2018 ===
Song	Artist(s)	Year
Hello Hi 2	Big Narstie x Ed Sheeran	2018
Hello Hi	Big Narstie	2018
Control	Big Narstie feat. Raleigh Ritchie	2018
Sloosha	Big Narstie	2018
Dumb	Imani Williams feat. Belly Squad	2018
12 Summers	Blade Brown	2018
Detention	LD feat. Tiggs Da Author	2018
Part 2 (Baddest)	LD feat. Tytus	2018
Stepped In	Dizzee Rascal feat. LD	2018
Greaze	LD feat. Tiggs Da Author, Monkey, ASAP	2018
Badman	Dubz feat. Tiggs Da Author, Krept & Konan	2018
Do My Thing	Tiggs Da Author	2018
Count on Me	Dappy	2018
Switch Sides	Big Heath feat. Geko	2018
Plan	Big Heath	2018
Oh My	Nines feat. Tiggs Da Author, Yung Fume, SL	2018
Waste	Lily Allen feat. Lady Chann	2018
Cake	Lily Allen	2018
Heaven Before All Hell Breaks Loose LP	Plan B	2018
God Forgive Me	Frisco feat. Tiggs Da Author	2018
Needles on the Floor	Potter Payper	2018

=== 2017 ===
Song	Artist(s)	Year
Good Luck Chale	J Hus feat. Tiggs Da Author	2017
Speaking Tongues	Robbie Williams	2017
Tight Up	Nadia Rose feat. Red Rat	2017
Hoes	Nines feat. Tiggs Da Author	2017
Mode	Lady Leshurr	2017
Y R U Lying?	Lady Leshurr	2017
Queen's Speech 7	Lady Leshurr	2017
I Know	Big Narstie	2017
BD Gang	Tremz feat. Big Narstie	2017
Young Bull	K Koke feat. S Loud	2017
Burning	Young Spray	2017

=== 2016 ===
Song	Artist(s)	Year
Queen's Speech 5	Lady Leshurr	2016
Queen's Speech 6	Lady Leshurr	2016
The BDL Skank	Big Narstie	2016
Symmetry	Wolfie	2016
100	Wolfie	2016
Obi Wan	Wolfie	2016
Run Out the Ends	Bonkaz	2016
Swear Down	Tiggs Da Author feat. Yungen	2016
Run	Tiggs Da Author feat. Lady Leshurr	2016
Yay	Nines feat. Tiggs Da Author	2016
ESG	Tinchy Stryder feat. Takura	2016
Sho	Young Spray, Chip, Stefflon Don, Devlin, Frisco, Ghetts	2016

=== 2015 ===
Song	Artist(s)	Year
Daily Duppy	Giggs	2015
Georgia	Tiggs Da Author	2015
Do It Right	Anne-Marie	2015
Yay	Nines feat. Tiggs Da Author	2015
Gas Pipe	Show N Prove × Big Narstie	2015
Monster	Jacob Banks feat. Avelino	2015
Come Over	Wolfie	2015
My Thought Heard	Nafe Smallz	2015
Fact	Show N Prove feat. Benny Banks	2015
Keep Up	KSI feat. Jme	2015

=== 2014 ===
Song	Artist(s)	Year
My Different	Rascals feat. Big Narstie	2014
Diamond in the Rough	SRG feat. Benny Banks	2014
Famous	Benny Banks	2014
If Only	Show N Prove feat. Shakka	2014
Brazilian	Show N Prove	2014

=== 2013 ===
Song	Artist(s)	Year
Zimma Frame	Show N Prove feat. Takura	2013
My People	Show N Prove	2013
California Love	Show N Prove	2013
It's Funny	Show N Prove feat. Tinchy Stryder, Squeeks	2013
Respect Me	Supar Novar	2013
Pop Off	Maxsta feat. Takura	2013
Pop Off (Remix)	Maxsta feat. Takura, Ghetts, Squeeks	2013
I Wanna Rock	Maxsta	2013
Wanna Go	Maxsta feat. Little Nikki	2013
Training Day Intro	Potter Payper	2013
So Many Ways	Haze feat. Sway, Hipman Junky	2013

=== 2012 ===
Song	Artist(s)	Year
Got to Be Right	Klashnekoff	2012
Sky High	Ghetts	2012
Get Money	Wretch 32	2012
Fars Yer Whop	Bang On!	2012
Nutter	Hipman Junkie feat. Harry Shotta	2012
In Liverpool	MR2G	2012
Loser	Rizzle Kicks	2012
Back In The Day	Rich Kidd	2012
You Ain't Right	MysDiggi feat. Thomas Jules	2012
Wait Your Turn	M.O	2012
What's Going Down	Rascals	2012
Get Down	Amplify Dot	2012
Who's the Daddy	Benny Banks feat. Dappy	2012
Legoman	Gfrsh, Squeeks, Ratlin	2012
Matter at Hand	Mad Sam feat. Joe Black	2012
Medicine	Joe Black	2012
Warm Up Sessions	Joe Black	2012
They Call Me E.X.O	Exo	2012

=== 2011 ===
Song	Artist(s)	Year
Hand on Your Gun	Lowkey	2011
Everything I Am	Lowkey	2011
Down	Show Dem Camp feat. Eva	2011
Paper	Show Dem Camp	2011
Talk About It	Show Dem Camp feat. 2Baba	2011
Bada Bing	Benny Banks	2011
Freestyle	Benny Banks	2011
Intro	Joe Black	2011
Show N Prove	Exo	2011
Warm Up Sessions	Squeeks	2011
Meet K (Can You Picture)	Squeeks	2011
Want It All	Mad Sam	2011

=== 2010 ===
Song	Artist(s)	Year
Call on You	Madhat feat. NoLay	2010
Helfi	Madhat	2010
Two	Madhat	2010
My Friend's Say	Madhat feat. Klashnekoff, King Response	2010
Killah	Stylah feat. Smiler	2010
Hard Way	Stylah	2010
Home I Need	Big Ben × Show N Prove	2010
Same Old Me	Big Ben	2010
Scuff It Out	Big Ben feat. Genesis Elijah, Stylah	2010
Closing In	Tinchy Stryder ft Stutta, Roachee	2010
Hard Where We Living	Rags	2010
2 Joints	Dead Set Gemini	2010

=== 2009 ===
Song	Artist(s)	Year
Home Sweet Home	Bigz feat. Sway	2009
You Dont Need A Man That Much	Baby Blue	2009
The Long Weekend EP	DeeZy	2009
Common Cause	Wordsmith feat. Genesis Elijah	2009
The Bad Guy	Wordsmith	2009
Coalition	Wordsmith	2009
Thus Far	Hydro	2009
Growin Up Process	Hydro	2009
Outta Sight	Hydro	2009
Thus Far	Hydro	2009

=== 2008 ===
Song	Artist(s)	Year
Ballistic Affair	Skinnyman feat. Deadly Hunta	2008
Going Home	Tor Cesay feat. Pariz-1, Envy	2008
The Return	Tor Cesay feat. Tutsue	2008
New Year Starting	Supar Novar	2008
Please Listen	Stylah	2008
Come Back	Hydro	2008
You Were There	Hydro	2008

=== 2007 ===
Song	Artist(s)	Year
Push The Boat Out	Pyrelli	2007

=== 2006 ===
Song	Artist(s)	Year
Reppin	Supar Novar	2006
Get Ready for War	Supar Novar	2006
What Do You Wanna Hear	Supar Novar	2006
Bigz Theme	Bigz	2006
Change	Bigz feat. Sincere, Skinnyman	2006
Strivin' Harder	Tor feat. Klashnekoff	2006

=== 2005 ===
Song	Artist(s)	Year
Intro	Baby Blue	2005
Sometimes	Baby Blue feat. Selah	2005

=== 2004 ===
Song	Artist(s)	Year
I Wanna Be a Star	Baby Blue	2004
