= Mamacita (Jason Derulo song) =

Single by Jason Derulo featuring Farruko
- Language: English; Spanish
- Released: July 5, 2019
- Length: 3:24
- Label: Warner
- Songwriter(s): Jason Desrouleaux; Carlos Efrén Reyes Rosado; Nicholas Gale; Danny Ocean; Edwin Serrano; Matthew Zara; Shawn Charles
- Producer(s): Digital Farm Animals

Jason Derulo singles chronology
"Let's Shut Up & Dance" (2019)	"Mamacita" (2019)	"Too Hot" (2019)

Farruko singles chronology
"Pelea" (2019)	"Mamacita" (2019)	"Rebota (Remix)" (2019)

"Mamacita" is a song by American singer Jason Derulo, featuring vocals from Puerto Rican singer and songwriter Farruko. It was released as a single on July 5, 2019, by Warner Records. The song was written by Carlos Efrén Reyes Rosado, Danny Ocean, Edwin Serrano, Jason Desrouleaux, Matt Zara, Nick Gale and Shawn Charles.

== Background ==
In a previous interview with Billboard, Derulo said, "I wanted to make a party song that had a Latin feel, when I got Farruko’s verse I felt like it was going to be fire."

== Music video ==
A music video to accompany the release of "Mamacita" was first released onto YouTube on July 18, 2019. Derulo directed the music video, which was filmed in Miami and Los Angeles.

== Track listing ==
Digital download
No.	Title	Length
1.	"Mamacita" (featuring Farruko)	3:24

Digital download
No.	Title	Length
1.	"Mamacita" (featuring Farruko; Cade remix)	2:37

== Personnel ==
- Digital Farm Animals – producer
- Jason Derulo – additional production, writer
- Lil Eddie – background vocals, production
- Yung Raf – background vocals
- Matt Zara – co-producer, writer
- Chris Gehringer – mastering
- Manny Marroquin – mixing
- Farruko – vocals, writer
- Danny Ocean – writer
- Edwin Serrano – writer
- Nick Gale – writer
- Shawn Charles – writer

== Charts ==
Chart performance for "Mamacita"
Chart (2019)	Peak position
Belgium (Ultratip Bubbling Under Wallonia)	44
Mexico Pop Español Airplay (Billboard)	31
New Zealand Hot Singles (RMNZ)	31

== Release history ==
Release history and formats for "Mamacita"
Region	Date	Format	Label	Ref.
Various	July 5, 2019	Digital download; streaming	Warner	
