= M Dot R =

English rapper

Moses Robert McGeorge
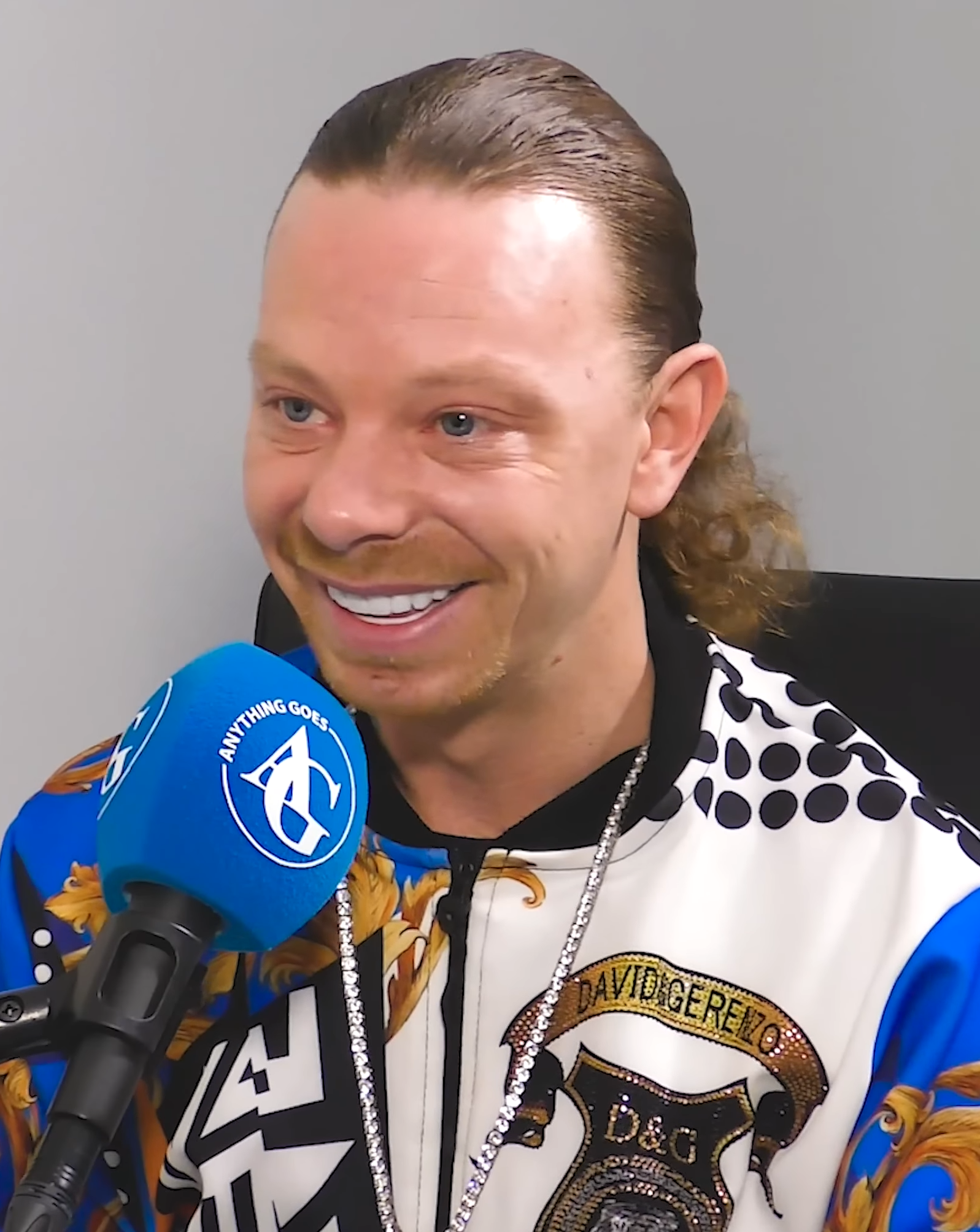
- M Dot R in 2024
- Born: Moses Robert McGeorge
- Other name: MC Skallier
- Occupations: Rapper; songwriter
- Musical career
- Origin: Isle of Sheppey, Kent
- Genres: Dancehall; hip-hop; reggae; grime

Moses Robert McGeorge, known professionally as M Dot R, is an English rapper. Born and raised on the Isle of Sheppey, he is known for his prolific use of Jamaican Patois. He is associated with dancehall, rap, and reggae. He is the subject of a documentary called White Lion.

Moses gained attention on the social media platform TikTok for the track "Turn Red", where he is seen lip-syncing whilst performing dances to the song in various locations, sometimes collaborating with celebrities of the platform. He has also appeared on several podcasts and his song has been used as viral audio on other social medias.

His song "Turn Red" has gained 10 million views on YouTube, with his newest release with Caribbean rapper "Fully Bad" titled "Dem Na Bad" has reached over 150,000 views.

== Biography ==
McGeorge grew up in Sheerness on the Isle of Sheppey, Kent. His parents have Irish and Scottish heritage. At the age of nine, he was introduced to Patois via his older sister's partner, who was from Saint Vincent. At the age of ten, he began rapping, and by age 14 was performing on pirate radio stations and in nightclubs. His mother was addicted to amphetamines, and he often had to go to sleep hungry. During an altercation with his older brother, who was addicted to heroin, he was stabbed in his arm when he was 14. He did not enjoy school and was expelled at age 15. Instead, he delivered newspapers full-time and did not complete his GCSE certificate. He fell into doing petty crimes, causing him to eventually move away from Kent.

M Dot R at Bluewater Shopping Centre on 10 May 2025

He moved to Lewisham, London at age 18, where he favored dancehall over grime. He met others interested in the dancehall and reggae industry, due in large part to the considerable Jamaican diaspora in London. He said he felt a strong sense of belonging with the black community in London. McGeorge also traveled intermittently to the Caribbean and Jamaica since he was around 16. He later moved back to Sheerness, where he further refined his style. His stage name is based on a trend wherein an artist would shorten their first name to a single letter with the suffix "-Dot", along with his initials of "MR". His first viral song was a freestyle called "100 Gyal" in 2017, and he was featured on a segment of Smile Jamaica where he won against two other artists by a public vote.

=== Mainstream success (2023–present) ===
Following the sudden and viral success of the song "Turn Red", McGeorge signed to Sony Music. In January 2024, McGeorge announced a single where he appears with American rapper Snoop Dogg.

== Discography ==
=== Singles ===
Title	Year
"Rise & Vibe"	2018
"Different"	2022
"Turn Red"	2023

=== Charts ===
Chart performance for "Turn Red"
Chart (2023)	Peak position
Sweden (Sverigetopplistan)	69
