= Enny =

English rapper and songwriter

- Born: Enitan Adepitan; 9 December 1994 (age 31); Thamesmead, London, England
- Genre: Hip hop
- Occupations: Rapper; singer; songwriter
- Years active: 2020–present
- Label: FAMM
- Website: ennyintegrity.com

Enitan Adepitan (born 9 December 1994), known professionally as Enny (stylized in all caps), is an English rapper, singer and songwriter. She is best known for her 2020 single "Peng Black Girls" which gained popularity following a remix version with Jorja Smith being performed live on ColorsxStudios.

== Early life ==
Enny's family came from Nigerian heritage. She was born and raised in Thamesmead, South East London. She lived with her parents and was one of six siblings. Enny’s interest in music started in early childhood. She experimented with music, influenced by her family. Her father taught her to play instruments including the keyboard. Enny also participated in a local street dance group in which they played and danced to American hip-hop. She inherited an interest in jazz, gospel music and hip-hop from her friends and family that would later have an impact on her music. After high school, she attempted to enter the film industry for two years. After finding herself unsuccessful and unsatisfied with her career path, she decided to focus on music and freestyling.

== Career ==
Enny began her music career by releasing freestyle videos on YouTube. These videos lead to her self-released debut single, "He's Not Into You", in April 2020. The single features "harsh truths" about dream relationships. With this hit single, Enny was recognized and introduced to the studio program Root 73 by her manager Pascal. She would later be scouted by English singer-songwriter Jorja Smith who signed her to her own label FAMM. She would later release "Peng Black Girls" which was produced in 2020. She also released a remixed version of the song featuring Smith.

== Discography ==
=== Extended plays ===
- Under Twenty Five (2021)
- We Go Again (2023)

=== Singles ===
List of singles as lead artist, showing selected chart positions, year released and album name
Title	Year	Peak chart positions	Album
Title	Year	UK	Album
"He's Not Into You"	2020	—	Non-album single
"Peng Black Girls" (featuring Amia Brave)	2020	76	Under Twenty Five
"Same Old"	2021	—	Under Twenty Five
"I Want"	2021	—	Under Twenty Five
"Keisha's & Brenda's"	2021	—	Under Twenty Five
"Bernie Mac" (featuring Odeal)	2021	—	Non-album single
"Champagne Problems"	2022	—	We Go Again
"No More Naija Men"	2023	—	We Go Again
"Take It Slow" (featuring Loyle Carner)	2023	—	We Go Again
"Charge It"	2023	—	We Go Again
"Cabin Feva"	2025	—	TBA
"Selfridges"	2025	—	TBA

=== Promotional singles ===
Title	Year	Album
"For South" (with The Silhouettes Project and Nix Northwest)	2020	The Silhouettes Project

== Awards and nominations ==
Organization	Year	Category	Nominated work	Result	Ref.
Rated Awards	2021	Female Artist of the Year	Herself	Nominated	
