= Skrapz =

British rapper

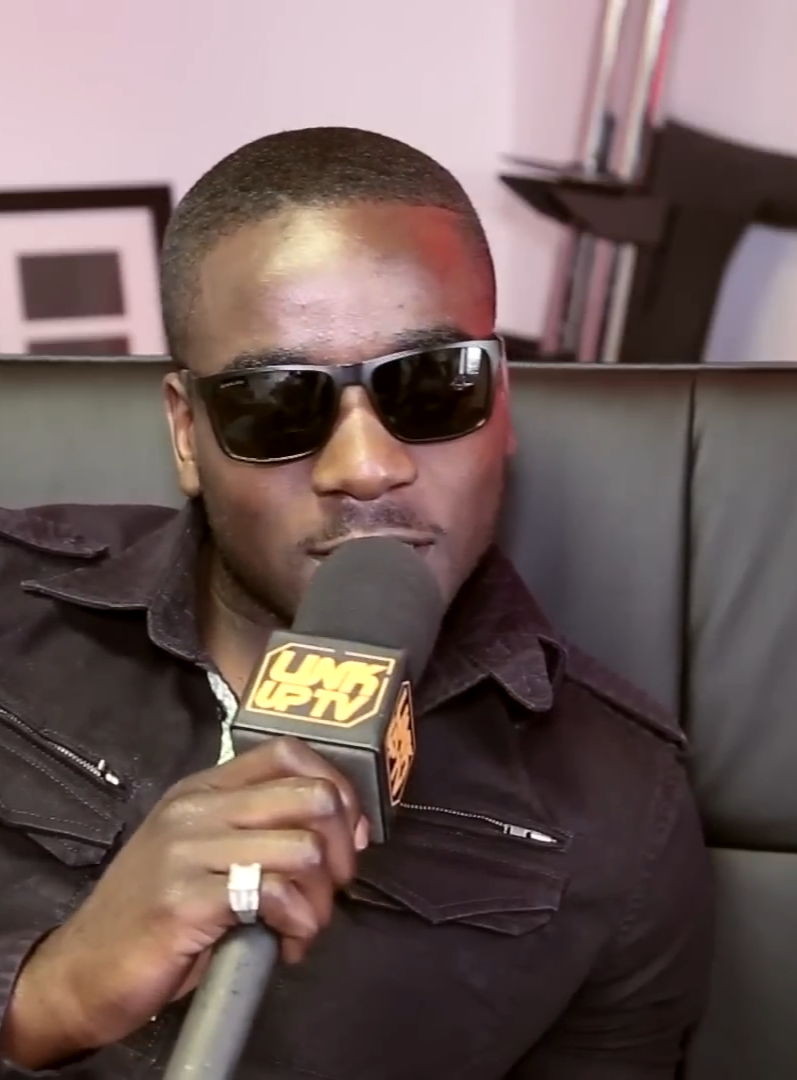
- Skrapz during a 2014 interview

Background information
- Also known as: Skrapsta
- Born: Christopher David Kyei; 11 November 1986 (age 39)
- Origin: Ghana, North West London, England
- Genres: Grime; UK rap
- Occupations: Rapper; MC
- Instrument: Vocals
- Years active: 2010–present
- Labels: 1&Only; EGA
- Website: skrapz.co.uk; instagram.com/csbskrapz

Christopher David Kyei (born 11 November 1986) is known professionally as Skrapz, is a British rapper. Skrapz was originally known as UK grime MC called Skrapsta, where "he was part of the collective SLK with human soundboard Flirta D and the likes of Van Damage and Lady Envy. SLK ended in 2007 and so he started the transition into rap."

== Career ==
In an interview with DJ Dubl on YouTube channel "DJDUBLTV", Skrapz explains that he enjoyed listening to Giggs before he went to prison, and then he met Giggs in prison. To his surprise, Giggs had asked him "I swear you rap?" to which Skrapz explained that he did. Skrapz explains to DJ Dubl that Giggs knew of Skrapz because Skrapz done a song with one of Giggs's friends Killa Ki called "Thug Life", and Killa Ki played the song to Giggs. After hearing the song, Giggs would check for Skrapz' music because he enjoyed it.

Skrapz has also collaborated with artists such as Blade Brown, D-Block Europe, Kano, Nines and Potter Payper. Skrapz has released music videos on online platforms such as GRM Daily and Link Up TV. Skrapz also has released song visualisers and videos on his own YouTube channel BigBoySkrapz.

== Legal issues ==
In January 2024, Jazzy from Ice City Boyz was found guilty of murdering a rival gang member, Craig Small, alongside that an attempted murder, perverting the course of justice and was sentenced to life imprisonment with a minimum term of 35 years.

Skrapz was found guilty of perverting the course of justice for assisting in the disposal of evidence, and sentenced to 4 years and 9 months, but was immediately released due to time served in custody on 2 February 2024.

== Discography ==
=== Albums ===
List of studio albums, with selected details and chart positions
| Title | Album details | Peak chart positions |
| Title | Album details | UK |
|---|---|---|
| The End of the Beginning | Released: 13 November 2015; Label: Self-released; Formats: Digital download, streaming | 48 |
| Different Cloth | Released: 27 October 2017; Label: 1&Only; Formats: Digital download, streaming | 33 |
| Be Right Back | Released: 25 June 2021; Label: 1&Only; Formats: Digital download, streaming | 55 |
| Reflection | Released: 1 March 2024; Label: 1&Only, EGA; Formats: Digital download, streaming | 10 |

=== Mixtapes ===
- Skrapz Is Back (2011)
- Shutdown Season (2013)
- Skrapz Is Back 2 (2014)
- 80s Baby (2014)

=== Music videos ===
- "Different"
- "Iron Mike
- "Mission Impossible"
- "Rap Ni**az" (with Flyo, Suspect OTB and Tiny Boost)
- "Round Here" (featuring Giggs)
- "They Ain't Ready"
