= Nines (rapper) =

English rapper (born 1990)

- Also known as: Nina / Nina wid da Nina / Church Road Saviour
- Born: Courtney Freckleton; 17 January 1990 (age 36); Harlesden, London, England
- Genres: British hip hop; road rap
- Years active: 2007–2024; 2026
- Labels: Warner Bros.; XL; Zino
- Member of: Ice City Boyz

Courtney Freckleton (born 17 January 1990), known professionally as Nines, is a British rapper.

After releasing a string of mixtapes between 2012 and 2015, Nines signed to XL Recordings and released his debut album One Foot Out (2017), which charted at number 4 on the UK Albums Chart. In 2018, his second album Crop Circle charted at number 5, and he topped the chart with his third album Crabs in a Bucket in 2020. In 2023 he released Crop Circle 2 and Crop Circle 3, which both charted at number 2, while Quit While You're Ahead reached number 4 in 2024.

== Personal life ==
Hailing from Harlesden, he grew up on Church End Estate in North-West London to Jamaican parents. His older siblings are Tyrone and Wayne Freckleton. In April 2008, Nines' brother Wayne was killed by gunfire in an alleged gangland attack.

In 2011, Nines hosted a charity event where he bought a variety of expensive clothing from JD Sports and handed the items to children that were invited to the event. On Christmas Day, he performed a similar charitable act, when he filled a vehicle full of Christmas turkeys and handed the birds to the public nearby the truck for free.

In June 2019, according to the Daily Star, Nines was stabbed in the face while sitting in his Porsche, which was also stolen by the attackers. An unnamed source close to Nines told the Daily Star, "Nines was in his Porsche when he was ambushed. They got in his car and stabbed him in the face then kicked him out into the road, leaving him for dead. The whole place is gonna go off."

== Career ==
=== 2007–2009: First appearances ===
Nines' first appearance in music was seen locally in his borough on the Running wid the Streets (also known as RWDS) DVD Volume 2 in 2007. He was featured freestyling at age 17 followed by some freestyles, which are now audio tracks on YouTube; such as "Piff", "Fuck All the Hoes", and "Nu Crack".

=== 2010–2014: Early mixtapes ===
On 27 November 2011 Nines released his first single, "AJ'd Out (JD Shutdown)" and on 25 December 2011 Nines released his second single, "My Hood (Turkey Shutdown)". Nines' third single featuring fellow rappers Fathead and Shotgun, "Way It's Gunna Go" was released on 18 March 2012. Nines' first appearance on a major platform was his Warm Up Session Freestyle was released on 12 June 2012 on SBTV. On 14 October 2012 Nines released his debut mixtape From Church Road to Hollywood. Nines released the music video for "CR (Grills Shutdown)" on 28 November 2012 on SBTV.

This was followed by Gone Till November (2013) the following year and titled after his absence from the music scene due to his imprisonment. Nines gradually saw a rise in popularity through his freestyle videos posted on online rap platform SB.TV.

Nines' online music videos for his third mixtape, Loyal to the Soil (2014), gained significant attention. "Money on My Mind" quickly amassed millions of views on YouTube. He is part of the collective Ice City Boyz alongside Likkle T, Skrapz, J Styles, Fatz, Big Keyz, Conna "Three Chainz" Haines, Trapstar Toxic, Streetz and others.

=== 2015–2017: One Foot In and One Foot Out ===
The song "Can't Blame Me" from his fourth mixtape One Foot In (2015) gained 19 million views. The mixtape One Foot In served as a prequel to his debut album.

The first promotional music video for One Foot Out was "Trapper of the Year", released on 27 August 2016, amassing more than 10 million views.

In December 2016, Nines signed to British independent label XL Recordings, partnering with them to release his debut studio album One Foot Out (2017). The release date was announced the day before its release, becoming available for purchase on 10 February 2017. It entered the UK Albums Chart at number 4, becoming one of the few English rappers to receive a top 5 album in recent years, among Skepta, Giggs and Krept and Konan.

=== 2018–2024: Crabs in a Bucket, Crop Circle trilogy, Quit While You're Ahead ===
In early April 2018, Nines released his first single since the release of his debut album, "I See You Shining", alongside a music video. It peaked at number 37 on the UK Singles Chart, becoming Nines' first and highest-charting single. It was later revealed to serve as the lead single to Nines' second album, Crop Circle, which was announced three days before no release. It was released on 20 April 2018 by XL Recordings.

Crabs in a Bucket was released on 28 August 2020 by Zino Records and Warner Records. It is the follow-up to Nines' second album, Crop Circle (2018). The album features guest appearances from Headie One, Roy Woods, Nafe Smallz, NorthSideBenji, NSG, Tiggs da Author, among others. It reached number one on the UK Albums Chart.

Crop Circle 2 was released on 28 April 2023 through Zino Records and Warner Music UK. It is the direct follow-up to Nines' second album, Crop Circle released in 2018. Nines also wrote and directed a short film by the same name featuring many songs from the album. Later that year, Nines released the third instalment to his Crop Circle album trilogy, Crop Circle 3, independently through Zino Records on 6 October 2023, along with the self-written and directed short film of the same name.

On 27 September 2024, Nines released his sixth and final studio album Quit While You're Ahead. Alongside the album, Nines confirmed the news of his last-ever headline show and music retirement, which took place at London’s iconic O2 Arena on 27 November 2024.

=== 2026: Lost Tapes and Young Nina ===
On 23 July 2026, Nines returned to the music industry with a compilation project titled Lost Tapes, with the project consisting of unreleased songs from previous projects. The project was announced on Nines's Instagram only 24 hours before its release.

On 30 October 2026, Nines released his final mixtape Young Nina, which included 15 tracks Nines recorded when he was 17 years old.

== Legal issues ==
In 2013, Nines was sentenced to 18 months imprisonment for possession of cannabis with intent to supply. According to Nines when he spoke to Chuckie Online in the "JD in the Duffle Bag Podcast", Nines finished his promotional mixtape called "Gone 'Til November" the weekend before his sentencing. Nines on his twitter page gave his Prison Mailing Address, to which many of his fans sent him fan mail. Upon his release, Nines bought expensive gifts and sent them by mail, and also drove round to some of the fans's houses who wrote fan mail for him whilst Nines was sitting time in Prison. This event was recorded on online music and interview platform SBTV.

On 12 August 2021, Nines admitted a charge relating to a plot with others to import 28 kilograms of cannabis from Spain and Poland, and admitted a further charge of money laundering related to a £98,000 debt and the street value of the cannabis. He was remanded in custody awaiting sentencing. On 1 October, he was sentenced to 28 months in HM Prison Wormwood Scrubs.

On 15 November 2023, Nines was arrested at Heathrow Airport. Two days later at Uxbridge Magistrates' Court he was charged with supply and possession of cannabis, as well as three counts of breaching a serious crime prevention order for allegedly not informing the police of his home address and his second mobile phone and laptop. He did not have to enter a plea, and was bailed. On 22 September 2025, Freckleton pleaded guilty to all three charges: supplying a Class B substance (cannabis), cannabis possession on 15 November 2024, and failure to comply with a Serious Crime Prevention Order (by failing to notify the authorities of a change of address). He was denied bail and remanded in custody at HM Prison Wandsworth. Freckleton was subsequently sentenced to 37 months' imprisonment. However, having already spent time in custody on remand, he was expected to serve approximately four to five further months in prison.

== Business ventures ==
Even though Nines retired from making music at age 34, Nines continues to:

- Direct his sound recording and music publishing activities company Zino Records;
- Direct/produce films for his company Ice City Films Limited;
- Sell clothing and footwear with his company Crop Circle World Limited;
- Sell pharmaceutical goods with his company Crop Circle Dispensary Limited.

== Discography ==
=== Studio albums ===
List of studio albums, with release date, label, and selected chart positions shown
Title	Album details	Peak chart positions				Certifications
Title	Album details	UK	UK R&B	UK Ind.	IRE	Certifications
One Foot Out	Released: 10 February 2017; Label: XL; Formats: CD, digital download, streaming	4	1	3	—	BPI: Gold
Crop Circle	Released: 20 April 2018; Label: XL; Formats: CD, digital download, streaming	5	2	4	—	BPI: Gold
Crabs in a Bucket	Released: 28 August 2020; Label: Zino, Warner; Formats: CD, digital download, streaming	1	1	—	26	BPI: Gold
Crop Circle 2	Released: 28 April 2023; Label: Zino, Warner; Formats: CD, digital download, streaming	2	1	—	15	BPI: Gold
Crop Circle 3	Released: 6 October 2023; Label: Zino; Formats: CD, digital download, streaming	2	1	3	12	BPI: Silver
Quit While You're Ahead	Released: 27 September 2024; Label: Zino; Formats: CD, digital download, streaming	4	1	—	19	BPI: Silver
"—" denotes a recording that did not chart or was not released in that territory.

=== Mixtapes ===
Title	Details	Peak chart positions
Title	Details	UK
From Church Rd. to Hollywood	Released: 14 October 2012; Label: Nitty Shutdown Ent.; Formats: Digital download	—
Gone Till November	Released: 4 July 2013; Label: Nitty Shutdown Ent.; Formats: Digital download	—
Loyal to the Soil	Released: 14 June 2014; Label: Nitty Shutdown Ent.; Formats: Digital download	—
One Foot In	Released: 14 August 2015; Label: Nitty Shutdown Ent.; Formats: Digital download	—
Young Nina	Released: 30 October 2026; Label: Zino; Formats: CD, cassette, digital download	30

=== Compilations ===
Title	Details	Peak chart positions
Title	Details	UK
Lost Tapes	Released: 24 July 2026; Label: Zino, Empire; Formats: Digital download	14

=== Singles ===
==== As lead artist ====
List of singles, with selected chart positions, showing year released and album name
Title	Year	Peak chart positions				Certifications	Album
Title	Year	UK	UK R&B	UK Ind.	IRE	Certifications	Album
"Yay" (featuring Tiggs Da Author)	2016	—	—	—	—	BPI: Silver	One Foot In
"High Roller" (featuring J Hus)	2017	—	14	8	—	BPI: Silver	One Foot Out
"I See You Shining"	2018	37	23	4	—	BPI: Platinum	Crop Circle
"Pride"	2019	41	20	—	—		Non-album single
"Clout"	2020	41	—	—	—		Crabs in a Bucket
"Airplane Mode" (featuring NSG)	2020	25	—	—	—	BPI: Silver	Crabs in a Bucket
"Tony Soprano 2"	2023	10	5	—	41	BPI: Silver	Crop Circle 2
"Calendar"	2023	19	9	—	93	BPI: Silver	Crop Circle 2
"Daily Duppy" (featuring GRM Daily)	2023	20	8	3	49		Crop Circle 3
"Toxic" (featuring Bad Boy Chiller Crew)	2023	37	—	14	—		Crop Circle 3
"Tony Soprano 3"	2024	44	8	—	—		Quit While You're Ahead
"Crazy"	2024	39	6	—	—		Quit While You're Ahead
"—" denotes a recording that did not chart or was not released in that territory.

==== As featured artist ====
List of singles as featured artist, with selected chart positions, showing year released and album name
Title	Year	Peak chart positions	Album
Title	Year	UK	Album
"On It" (Mist featuring Nines)	2018	66	Diamond in the Dirt
"Jumpout" (Skrapz featuring Nines)	2021	91	Be Right Back
"Amen" (Tion Wayne featuring Nines)	2023	43	Non-album single

=== Other charted and certified songs ===
List of other charted and certified songs, with selected chart positions and certifications, showing year released and album name
Title	Year	Peak chart positions			Certifications	Album
Title	Year	UK	UK R&B	IRE	Certifications	Album
"Cr"	2012	—	—	—	BPI: Silver	From Church Rd. to Hollywood
"Oh My" (featuring SL, Tiggs Da Author & Yung Fume)	2018	44	29	—	BPI: Gold	Crop Circle
"Rubber Bands" (featuring Ray BLK and Skrapz)	2018	61	3	—		Crop Circle
"Venting" (featuring Dave)	2018	—	—	—	BPI: Silver	Crop Circle
"NIC" (featuring Tiggs Da Author)	2020	54	—	—	BPI: Silver	Crabs in a Bucket
"Favela" (featuring J Styles)	2023	34	—	—		Crop Circle 2
"Different League" (featuring Clavish and Nafe Smallz)	2023	93	35	—		Crop Circle 2
"I Do" (featuring Mugzz)	2023	35	20	—		Crop Circle 3
"Cold Hearted World 3" (with Marnz Malone)	2024	65	23	—		Quit While You're Ahead
"—" denotes a recording that did not chart or was not released in that territory.

==== Guest appearances ====
List of guest appearances singles, showing year released, other artists and album name
Title	Year	Other artist(s)	Album
"Not Over Yet" (Remix)	2022	KSI, Headie One	Non-album single
