= Dancehall Queen (disambiguation) =

Dancehall Queen is a 1997 Jamaican film.

Dancehall Queen may also refer to:

- "Dancehall Queen", a song by Beenie Man in the film
- "Dancehall Queen" (Robyn song), a 2010 song by Robyn
- Dancehall Queens, female celebrities in the dancehall music genre
  - Carlene Smith, the first Dancehall Queen, 1992
  - Denise Cumberland, Dancehall Queen, 1999
  - Junko Kudō, Dancehall Queen, 2002
  - Mad Michelle, Dancehall Queen, 2003

== See also ==
- Lady Saw (born 1968), Jamaican reggae singer known as the queen of dancehall
