= Dale (album) =

Studio album by Pitbull
- Released: July 17, 2015
- Recorded: 2014–2015
- Genres: Reggaeton, Latin
- Length: 44:04
- Language: Spanish
- Labels: Mr. 305; RCA

Pitbull chronology
Globalization (2014)	Dale (2015)	Climate Change (2017)

Singles from Dale
- 1. "Como Yo Le Doy" Released: July 8, 2014; 2. "Piensas (Dile la Verdad)" Released: November 20, 2014; 3. "El Taxi" Released: November 20, 2014; 4. "Baddest Girl in Town" Released: June 8, 2015

Dale (pronounced [ˈdale]; Spanish for "Hit it") is the second Spanish album and ninth studio album by American rapper Pitbull. It was released July 17, 2015, through Mr. 305 and Sony Music Latin. This album arrived almost five years after his first Spanish-language album Armando, released in 2010. The album won the Grammy Award for Best Latin Rock, Urban or Alternative Album at the 58th Annual Grammy Awards.

== Background ==
The teaser for the release of Dale was released by Pitbull via Facebook and Twitter on May 6, 2015. On May 19, 2015 Farruko uploaded, on Facebook, a short preview of the track "Hoy Se Bebe" featured on "Dale". On June 27, Pitbull announced the official track list: the album includes collaborations with Farruko, Fuego, El Micha, Ricky Martin, Mohombi, Wisin & Yandel, Osmani Garcia, Sensato del Patio, Don Miguelo and El Chevo.

== Singles ==
- "Como Yo Le Doy" was released as the album's lead single on July 8, 2014. The track features Don Miguelo.
- "Piensas (Dile la Verdad)" was released as the album's second single November 20, 2014. The track features Gente De Zona. On July 24 there was released a Spanglish version of the song with Shaggy on Spotify.
- "Baddest Girl in Town" featuring Mohombi and Wisin, was released on June 8, 2015 as the album's third single. The song was performed by trio on Latin Award show- Premios Juventud on July 16, 2015.

=== Promotional singles ===
- "El Taxi" featuring Sensato and Osmani Garcia, was released on May 15, 2015, as the album's first promotional single. The song is a Spanish adaptation of "Murder She Wrote", by Jamaican reggae duo Chaka Demus & Pliers. A Spanglish remix with Lil' Jon and Osmani Garcia, with an alternate version with Machel Montano, were also released as the Carnival Remix.

== Critical reception ==
Professional ratings
Review scores
Source	Rating
AllMusic	3.5/5 stars
Rolling Stone	3.5/5 stars

AllMusic critic David Jeffries wrote: "It's the Pitbull album that feels most like a party with all these friends dropping in and out, and this wild night out peaks toward the end with the highlights running from the club-worthy "Baddest Girl in Town" (the first clue that this album isn't all-Spanish like Armando) to the '80s-flavored, Human League-quoting "No Puedo Más."" Jed Gottlieb of Boston Herald stated "If you really miss Pit's lyrics, I suggest you make your own. I'm sure they'll be better than 'Big news, Pitbull, Tom Cruise, Mumbai I lit up their December night like the fourth of July, Vanilla Sky.'" Brittany Spanos of Rolling Stone noted that unlike Pitbull's previous Spanish language effort Armando, Dale "skips EDM and Southern hip-hop almost entirely in favor of a fuller Latin-fusion sound." The American edition of Rolling Stone magazine placed Dale at number 2 in the list for the "10 Best Latin Albums of the Year", arguing that the singer "volleys between English and Spanish with ease, flirting with dancehall and guaguancó elements, while bringing MCs from neighboring islands along for the ride."

== Commercial performance ==
Dale debuted at number one on the US Top Latin Albums chart, earning 5,000 album-equivalent units in its first week, according to Nielsen Music. This became Pitbull's first number one on that chart. The album also debuted at number 97 on the US Billboard 200 chart.

== Track listing ==
No.	Title	Writer(s)	Producer(s)	Length
1.	"Piensas (Dile la Verdad)" (featuring Gente de Zona)	Armando C. Pérez aka Pitbull, José C. García, Jorge Gómez, AJ Jannusi, Bilal Hajji, Justin Trugman, Alexander Delgado, Randy Malcolm, Michael Calderon	DJ Chino, Jorgie, Justin Trugman, AJ Junior, Bilal TheChef	3:46
2.	"Como Yo Le Doy" (featuring Don Miguelo)	Armando C. Perez, Michael Calderón, Miguel Ángel Valerio Lebrón	Don Miguelo, Mike Calderon, Max Borghetti	4:22
3.	"El Taxi" (featuring Sensato and Osmani García)	English: John Taylor, Everton Bonner, Lloyd Oliver "Gitsy" Willis, Sly Dunbar / Spanish: Osmani Garcia, Armando C. Pérez, William Reyna, José C. García, Jorge Gómez.	DJ Chino, Jorgie, DJ Unic	4:10
4.	"Yo Quiero (Si Tú Te Enamoras)" (Gente de Zona featuring Pitbull)		DJ Chino, Jorgie, Motiff	3:28
5.	"El Party" (featuring El Micha)		DJ Chino, Jorgie, DVLP	3:55
6.	"Mami Mami" (featuring Fuego)		DJ Chino, Jorgie, DVLP	3:32
7.	"Baddest Girl in Town" (featuring Mohombi and Wisin)	Armando C. Pérez, Mika Moupondo, Alexandru Cotoi, Mohombi Moupondo, Juan Luis Morera Luna, José C. Garcia, Jorge Gómez.	Alexandru Cotoi, Mika Moupondo, DJ Chino	3:03
8.	"Chi Chi Bon Bon" (featuring Osmani García)		DJ Chino, Jorgie, Javier Conde Alonso	3:37
9.	"Haciendo Ruido" (featuring Ricky Martin)		DJ Chino, Jorgie, AJ Junior, Jimmy Joker	3:08
10.	"Hoy Se Bebe" (featuring Farruko)		DJ Chino, Jorgie	3:36
11.	"No Puedo Más" (featuring Yandel)		DJ Chino, Jorgie, Bilal the Chef, DVLP	3:45
12.	"Que Lo Que" (Sensato featuring Pitbull, Papayo and El Chevo)	Armando Pérez, Sensato Del Patio, Leo Brooks, Federico Vindver, Manuel Corao, Michael Calderón, Robert Fernandéz, Mario Coto, Cesar Cáceres	Mario Genio Coto	3:43
Total length:				44:04

== Charts ==
=== Weekly charts ===
Chart (2015)	Peak position
Spanish Albums (Promusicae)	62
Swiss Albums (Schweizer Hitparade)	71
US Billboard 200	97
US Top Latin Albums (Billboard)	1
US Latin Rhythm Albums (Billboard)	1

=== Year-end charts ===
Chart (2015)	Position
US Top Latin Albums (Billboard)	19
Chart (2016)	Position
US Top Latin Albums (Billboard)	15
Chart (2017)	Position
US Top Latin Albums (Billboard)	99

== Certifications ==
Region	Certification	Certified units/sales
Mexico (AMPROFON)	Gold	30,000^{‡}
United States (RIAA)	3× Platinum (Latin)	180,000^{‡}
^{‡} Sales+streaming figures based on certification alone.

== See also ==
- List of number-one Billboard Latin Albums from the 2010s
