= Kemar McGregor =

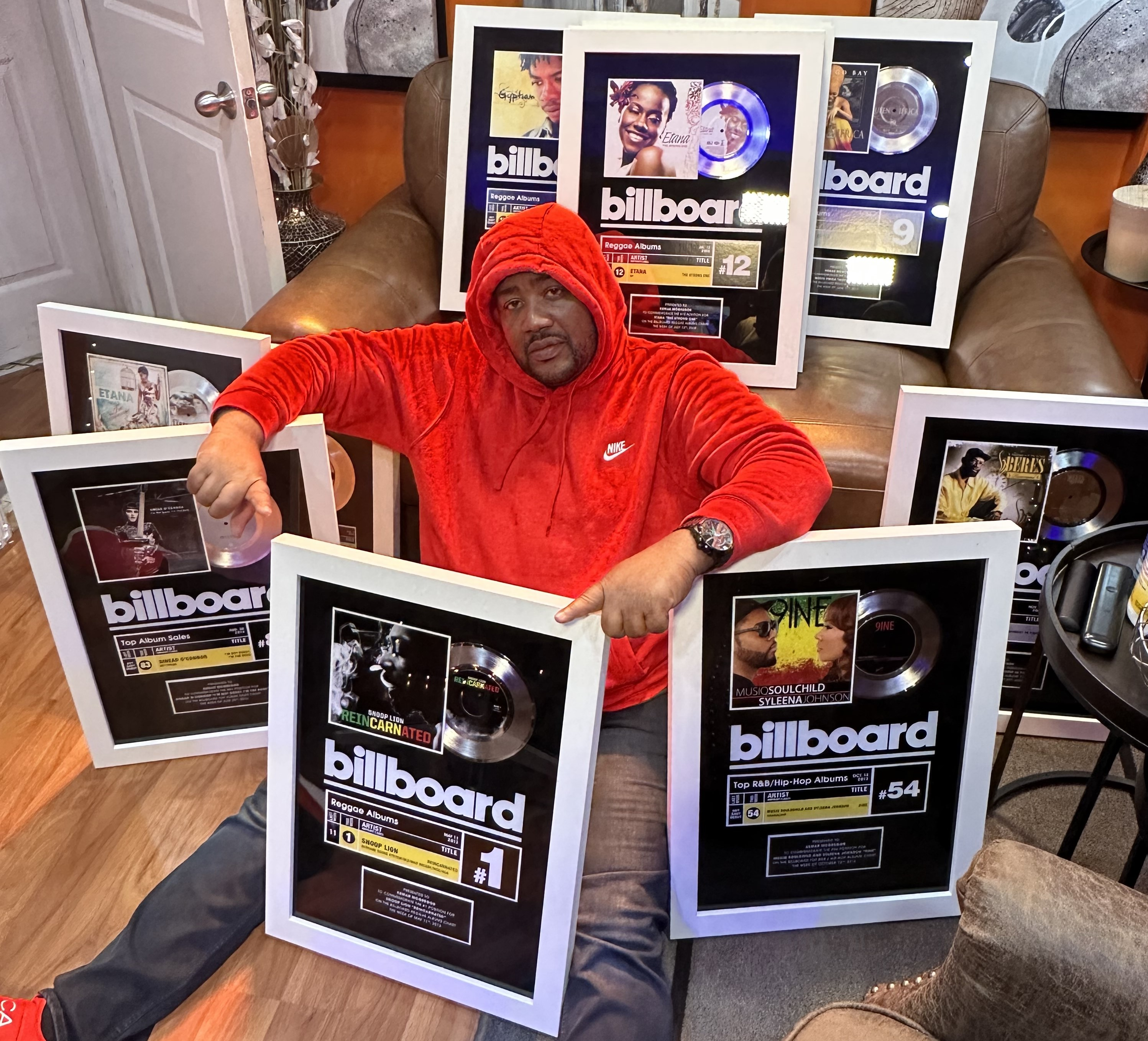

Background information
- Also known as: Kemar McGregor the Billboard King
- Born: Kemar McGregor; 20 June 1980 (age 46); Kingston, Jamaica
- Origin: Kingston, Jamaica
- Genre: Reggae
- Occupations: Producer, songwriter, Sound Engineer, Music Retailer
- Years active: 1999–present
- Labels: No Doubt Records, FM Records

Kemar McGregor (born 20 June 1980), also known by his nickname, Kemar McGregor the Billboard King, is a Jamaican-American pop reggae, hip-hop, R&B and Dancehall producer. He has recorded and produced music for the most renowned artists in the music industry, including Snoop Dogg, Ashanti, T.I., French Montana, Rick Ross, Sinéad O'Connor, Musiq Soulchild, Syleena Johnson, Mya, Jon Secada, Maxi Priest, Stefflon Don, Lola Brooke, Rotimi, Sizzla, Marcia Griffiths, Beenie Man, Wayne Wonder, Buju Banton, Vybz Kartel, Elephant Man, Capleton, Sanchez, Freddie McGregor, Luciano, Sugar Minott, Barrington Levy, Gregory Isaacs, Morgan Heritage, Half Pint, Tanya Stephens, Gyptian, Cas Haley, Beres Hammond, Glen Washington, Vanessa Bling, Etana, Bounty Killer and Cocoa Tea, among many others. McGregor is the owner and chief executive officer of FM Records. Kemar McGregor has sold millions of records worldwide

Kemar McGregor was born in the Community 7 section of Kingston and grew up in Montego Bay, Jamaica. He worked as a radio deejay on RJR 94 FM in Kingston before founding his first recording label, No Doubt Records, in 2001. McGregor's smooth, seamless mixing style earned him the nickname "Flava" among established Jamaican selectors, prompting McGregor to adopt the radio pseudonym "DJ Flava."

== Beginning career: 1999–2005 ==
Kemar McGregor is a family relative of reggae producer Wycliffe "Steely" Johnson from renowned reggae production team Steely and Clevie. As a teenager, McGregor began experimenting with Steely's production equipment, imitating the styles of his musical idols, Bob Marley and Clement "Coxsone" Dodd. McGregor officially began producing roots reggae in 1999. The first song he produced was Turbulence's lovers rock single, "Name and Number" (1999). In 2002, McGregor established an exclusive production/publishing deal with Germany-based Hammer Musik, and he was the executive producer of many chart-topping reggae albums that later appeared on the Bogalusa/Hammer Musik label. These albums include: the first five volumes of the "Reggae Now" compilation series; Sizzla's "Speak of Jah" and "Brighter Day;" Anthony B's "Smoke Free;" Turbulence's "Join Us," "United," and "Triumphantly;" and Luciano's "Upright" album, which was named "album of the month" on the German reggae charts in 2005. All songs on these albums were published by the Kingston Songs publishing company.

=== VP Records and Greensleeves Records: 2006–2010 ===
"Gyptian – Beautiful Lady"
Produced by Kemar McGregor

Two years prior to his licensing career with VP Records, McGregor began independently recording future reggae superstar Gyptian in 2004. His first singles with Gyptian, – anti-violence anthem "Serious Times," and cultural ballad "Mama,"—went viral within Jamaica's reggae industry. Gyptian's "Serious Times" was tied with Damian Marley's global hit, "Welcome to Jamrock," as the Jamaica Observer's "Song of the Year" in 2005. McGregor's concept, catchy melodies and clear lyrics, enabled his vocalists to score massive hit singles during the millennial decade. His successes with Gyptian led to similar cultural reggae hits, including Etana's politically conscious mantra, "I Am Not Afraid," Queen Ifrica's incestial-abuse condemnation, "Daddy Don't Touch Me There" and Richie Spice's post-9/11 commentary, "The Plane Land"—these songs would make McGregor's production abilities visible to major reggae labels, including New York-based VP Records, and London-based Greensleeves Records. McGregor officially began licensing albums to VP Records in 2006. He is the executive producer of Gyptian's first three albums, "My Name Is Gyptian (VP Records 2006)," "I Can Feel Your Pain (VP Records 2008)," and "Revelations (FM Records 2010)." McGregor is also the executive producer of Chuck Fenda's "Fulfillment" LP. During his tenure with VP Records, McGregor produced hit singles for several of VP Records' most successful albums, including Richie Spice's "Gideon Boot," Etana's "Strong One," Morgan Heritage's "Mission in Progress," Beres Hammond's "A Moment in Time," Fantan Mojah's "Stronger," and Queen Ifrica's "Montego Bay." McGregor's production of Richie Spice's hit, "The Plane Land," propelled Spice's album, "Gideon Boot," to a number one ranking on the Billboard Reggae Chart in 2008. In similar fashion, McGregor's production of Morgan Heritage's hit single, "Nothing To Smile About," elevated the group's album, "Mission in Progress," to number one on the Billboard Reggae Albums Chart in 2008. Elsewhere, McGregor's production of Beres Hammond's "I Surrender" elevated Hammond's "A Moment in Time" album to number one on the Billboard Reggae Albums Chart in 2008, and McGregor's production of Etana's single "I Am Not Afraid," catapulted her 2008 album, "The Strong One," to a number 12 ranking on the Billboard Reggae Albums Chart. Many of McGregor's songs were selected for VP Records' greatest-hits compilation series, "Strictly the Best," "Reggae Gold" and "Songs for Reggae Lovers;" Greensleeves Records' "Reggae One Drop Anthems" series; and Cousins Records "Strictly One Drop," and "Strictly Lovers Rock" series.

=== Cousins Records and Tad's Records: 2007–2009 ===
Beginning in 2007, McGregor was executive producer for several artist LPs released by UK-based Cousins Records and US-Based Tad's International Records, Inc. These albums include: Chezidek's "Firm Up Yourself" (Cousins Records 2007); Natty King's "Trodding" (Tad's 2009) and Glen Washington's "Vibes" (Cousins 2009). All of the Kemar McGregor masters licensed to VP Records, Cousins Records and Tad's Records are owned and controlled by Kemar McGregor, Ingo Kleinhammer and/or Stephan Warren.

=== FM Records: 2010–present ===
In 2010, McGregor began releasing his music through his proprietary FM Records label. He released a series of successful riddim compilation albums during this time, including: "Dance Drop Riddim" (2010), "Throwback Riddim" (2011), "Cool and Deadly Riddim" (2011), "Club Dance Riddim" (2012), "Rock & Come in Riddim" (2012) and "80s Rock Riddim" (2013). McGregor began to embrace British Lovers Rock music in 2011, releasing romantic reggae albums, EPs and maxi-singles with Maxi Priest, JC Lodge, Carroll Thompson, Janet Kay, Adele Harley, Gappy Ranks and Roger Robin.

== Pop reggae movement: 2011 to present ==
"Sinead O'Connor – How About I Be Me?"
Produced by Kemar McGregor

During September 2011, McGregor recorded the single "How About I Be Me" with rock star Sinéad O'Connor, in an effort to create a more commercial reggae sound. Since the release of "How About I Be Me," and its subsequent radio airplay, McGregor made a transition toward recording pop singers on reggae riddims, employing a greater proportion of uplifting, radio-friendly lyrics and commercial production techniques. In 2013, McGregor is preparing to release pop-reggae music from a collection of American, Canadian and European pop stars, including Musiq Soulchild, Syleena Johnson, Sinéad O'Connor, Divine Brown, Elaine Shepherd, Dru and Jesse Giddings. McGregor is the executive producer of Musiq Soulchild and Syleena Johnson's full-length reggae LP, titled "9INE," which debuted at number one on the Billboard Reggae Albums Chart during the week of 12 October 2013. The 9INE LP was released 24 September 2013 by Shanachie Records. The Atlanta recording sessions for the "9INE" LP were featured on the TV One reality series, "R&B Divas," in which McGregor appeared in two episodes. The first single from the 9INE LP, titled "Feel the Fire," was premiered on Billboard.com 15 May 2013, and was officially released 16 July 2013 on iTunes. The song entered the Top 100 on the iTunes R&B/Soul Singles Chart during the last week of July 2013.

== Name controversy ==
Contrary to popular rumours, Kemar McGregor is not the son of legendary reggae vocalist Freddie McGregor. In response to several internet media reports claiming him to be the son of Freddie McGregor, Kemar replied, "I don't know what else to do ... it happens here in Jamaica, it happens overseas. I am at the airport in New York and the immigration people tell me 'I listen to your dad's songs, he's good.' And when I say, 'He's not my dad,' they give me a strange look, so sometimes I just leave it alone."

== Awards and accomplishments ==
McGregor has been nominated for the EME "Reggae Producer of the Year" award every year since 2007, and was also nominated for "Reggae Riddim of the Year" in 2008 and 2011. He was nominated for "Reggae Producer of the Year" at the New York IRAMA Awards show in 2008, and was nominated for "Reggae Producer of the Year" in the Joe Higgs Music Awards (JHMA) in 2008. In addition, McGregor is the first roots reggae producer to dominate the Foundation Radio Network's New York Top 30 chart and South Florida Top 20 chart by having six songs listed on both charts simultaneously.

As a producer, Kemar McGregor has placed four albums within the Billboard Reggae Albums chart, including Sizzla's "Speak of Jah (2004)," Gyptian's "My Name Is Gyptian (2006)," Gyptian's "I Can Feel You Pain (2008)" and Musiq Soulchild & Syleena Johnson's pop-reggae album, "9INE (2013)," which debuted at No. 1 on the Billboard Reggae Albums chart in October 2013.

Kemar McGregor is a three-time JUNO Award-nominated producer. In 2013, the McGregor-produced single "Radio," performed by Canadian pop-reggae singer Ammoye, was nominated for a JUNO Award in the "Reggae Recording of the Year" category. In 2014, the McGregor-produced singles, "Baby It's You," also performed by Ammoye, and "Love Collision," performed by Canadian pop singer Dru, were both nominated for JUNO Awards in the "Reggae Recording of the Year" category.

=== Billboard Chart appearances ===
Year	Artist	Title	Chart Category	Peak position	Role
2004	Sizzla	"Speak of Jah"	Billboard Reggae Albums	No. 2	Producer
2006	Gyptian	"My Name Is Gyptian"	Billboard Reggae Albums	No. 13	Producer
2008	Gyptian	"I Can Feel Your Pain"	Billboard Reggae Albums	No. 4	Publisher, Producer
2008	Beres Hammond	"A Moment in Time" ("I Surrender" track)	Billboard Reggae Albums	No. 1	Composer, Producer
2008	Etana	"The Strong One" ("I Am Not Afraid" track)	Billboard Reggae Albums	No. 1	Composer, Producer
2008	Richie Spice	"Gideon Boot" ("The Plane Land" track)	Billboard Reggae Albums	No. 1	Co-Writer, Publisher, Producer
2008	Morgan Heritage	"Mission in Progress" ("Nothing to Smile About" track)	Billboard Reggae Albums	No. 1	Co-Writer, Publisher, Producer
2009	Queen Ifrica	"Montego Bay" ("Daddy" track)	Billboard Reggae Albums	No. 9	Co-Writer, Publisher, Producer
2010	Gyptian	"Hold You"	Billboard Hot 100	No. 77	20% Publisher
2010	Gyptian	"Hold You" (Album)	Billboard Reggae Albums	No. 2	Publisher, Producer
2011	Etana	"Free Expressions"	Billboard Reggae Albums	No. 11	Producer
2012	Sinéad O'Connor	"How About I Be Me? (Digital/Deluxe)" ("VIP" track)	Billboard 200	No. 115	Co-Writer
2013	Musiq Soulchild & Syleena Johnson	"9INE"	Billboard Top R&B/Hip-Hop Albums	No. 54	Producer
2013	Musiq Soulchild & Syleena Johnson	"9INE"	Billboard Reggae Albums	No. 1	Producer
2013	Snoop Lion	"Reincarnated" ("Light It Up" track)	Billboard Reggae Albums	No. 1	Producer
2014	Sinéad O'Connor	"I'm Not Bossy, I'm the Boss" ("How About I Be Me?" track)	Billboard Top Album Sales	No. 83	Composer, Producer
2018	Khago	"Walk a Mile"	Billboard Reggae Albums	No. 5	Producer
2018	Khago	"Dancehall SOCA"	Billboard Reggae Albums	No. 4	Producer
2026	Snoop Dogg	"For You"	Billboard Rhythmic Airplay	No. 33	Artist/Producer

== Discography ==
Albums executive produced by Kemar McGregor

- 2003: Smoke Free, by Anthony B (Bogalusa Records)
- 2003: Join Us, by Turbulence (Bogalusa Records)
- 2004: Speak of Jah, by Sizzla (Bogalusa Records)
- 2005: Triumphantly, by Turbulence (Bogalusa Records)
- 2005: Upright, by Luciano (Bogalusa Records)
- 2005: Brighter Day, by Sizzla (Bogalusa Records)
- 2006: My Name Is Gyptian, by Gyptian (VP Records)
- 2007: I Can Feel Your Pain, by Gyptian (VP Records)
- 2007: United, by Turbulence (Bogalusa Records)
- 2008: Fulfillment, by Chuck Fenda (VP Records)
- 2009: Firm Up Yourself, by Chezidek (Cousins Records)
- 2009: Vibes, by Glen Washington (Cousins Records)
- 2009: Trodding, by Natty King (Tad's Records)
- 2010: Revelations, by Gyptian (FM Records)
- 2013: 9INE, by Musiq Soulchild & Syleena Johnson
- 2026: Eminence, by Kemar McGregor the Billboard King, Beenie Man, Snoop Dogg, T.I., Rick Ross, Ashanti, Mya, Lola Brooke, Rotimi

Riddim albums composed and produced By Kemar McGregor

- 2006: Triumphant Riddim (Greensleeves)
- 2008: Rub-A-Dub Riddim (VP Records)
- 2008: Drop It Riddim (Tad's Records)
- 2008: 83 Riddim (Greensleeves)
- 2009: Rocksteady Riddim (VP Records)
- 2009: Sweet Riddim (VP Records)
- 2009: Ghetto Riddim (VP Records)
- 2010: Classic Riddim (VP Records)
- 2010: Dance Drop Riddim (FM Records)
- 2011: Throwback Riddim (FM Records)
- 2011: Cool and Deadly Riddim (FM Records)
- 2012: Club Dance Riddim (FM Records)
- 2012: Rock and Come in Riddim (FM Records)
- 2013: 80s Rock Riddim (FM Records)

Albums composed By Kemar McGregor

- 2010: Revolution Is Rhythmic, by Mandelson

Singles co-written, composed and produced by Kemar McGregor

- Maxi Priest – Fly High
- Maxi Priest – Bonafide
- Cas Haley – Never Gonna Let You Go
- Barrington Levy feat. Gyptian – Murderer
- Luciano – Upright
- Sanchez – If It's Right It's Right
- Divine Brown feat. Gyptian – Beautiful Lady
- Morgan Heritage – Nothing To Smile About
- Queen Ifrica – Daddy
- Richie Spice – De Plane Land
- Turbulence – Name And Number
- Nesbeth – Board House
- Gyptian – Serious Times
- Gyptian – Beautiful Lady
- Gyptian – I Can Feel Your Pain
- Gyptian – Beng Beng
- Gyptian – Mama
- Etana – Happy Heart
- Etana – Free
- Gramps Morgan – One in a Million

Singles composed and produced by Kemar McGregor

- Rick Ross & Kemar McGregor – Loaded
- Rick Ross & Etana – Kiss of Judas
- Beenie Man & Mya – Don't Rush
- Beenie Man & Etana – Guide Over Us
- Buju Banton & Kemar McGregor – This Is Jamaica
- Sinéad O'Connor – How About I Be Me?
- Musiq Soulchild & Syleena Johnson – Feel The Fire
- Musiq Soulchild & Syleena Johnson – Promise
- Syleena Johnson – So Big
- Jon Secada – Just Another Day (Reggae Version)
- Beenie Man – Stand in Love
- Wayne Wonder – Your Eyes
- Buju Banton feat. Jovi Rockwell – Lonely Night
- JC Lodge – Love Transfusion
- Beres Hammond – I Surrender
- Marcia Griffiths – Story
- Capleton – Same Old Story
- Freddie McGregor – Keep on Coming Back For More
- Sizzla – Speak of Jah
- Anthony B – Smoke Free
- Ammoye – Radio
- Ce'Cile – No Other Man
- Adele Harley – Remember
- Jesse Giddings feat. Tiana – Back To Me
- Dru – Gettin' It In
- Dru – Love Collision
- Tomorrow People – Here To Stay
- Peter Spence – Every Little Thing
- Peter Hunnigale – Cool and Deadly
- Jah Cure – This One For You mother
- Etana – I Am Not Afraid
- Glen Washington – Vibes
- Chezidek – Firm Up Yourself
- Natty King – Trodding
- Janet Kay – Didn't You Know
- Carroll Thompson – Can't Get You Out of My Head
- Chuck Fenda – Herbalist Farmer
- Sammy Dread feat. Chuck Fenda – Bad Boy Fire M16
- Lutan Fyah – Eden
- Dwayne Stephenson – Black Gold
- Gappy Ranks – Hello
- Fantan Mojah – Most High Jah
- Alborosie feat. The Tamlins – Inna The Garrison
- Peetah Morgan feat. Busy Signal – Unfair
- Daville – Soldier Girl
- Ginjah – Never Lost My Way
- Konshens – Teach Them How To Pray
- Tanya Stephens – Free Spirit
- I-Wayne – One Hit Wonder
- Ziggi – Back Biters
- I-Octane – Poverty
- Natural Black – Love You

Singles produced by Kemar McGregor

- Turbulence – Stuck On You
- Ginjah – Wonderful Tonight
