= Murder She Wrote (song) =

Single by Chaka Demus & Pliers

from the album Tease Me
- Released: 1992
- Studio: Dynamic Sounds (Kingston, Jamaica); Sonic Sounds (Kingston, Jamaica)
- Genre: Reggae; dancehall
- Length: 4:04
- Label: Mango; Taxi
- Songwriters: John Taylor; Everton Bonner; Lloyd "Gitsy" Willis; Sly Dunbar
- Producers: Sly & Robbie; Lloyd "Gitsy" Willis

Chaka Demus & Pliers UK singles chronology
"Twist and Shout" (1993)	"Murder She Wrote" (1993)	"I Wanna Be Your Man" (1994)

"Murder She Wrote" is a song by Jamaican reggae duo Chaka Demus & Pliers, from their 1993 album Tease Me. It was first released as a single in 1992 and again in late 1993 by Mango and Taxi Records, reaching number 27 on the UK Singles Chart in early 1994, and number 57 on the US Billboard Hot 100, spending 17 weeks there. The song was certified gold in the UK in 2022. The music to the song is based on the Maytals' 1966 song "Bam Bam", while the lyrics discuss abortion (as revealed in the third verse).

The song became a staple for weddings, BBQs, and clubs and has been called one of the best and most important dancehall tracks of all time. The tag team effort of call and response verses with melodic choruses introduced a new format of toasting from Jamaica, influencing pan-Caribbean culture and crossing over globally. It went on to impact other stars of the genre like Shaggy and Sean 'YoungPow' Diedrick.

Sampling wise, the song was included in Billboard's list of the "Best Song Interpolations of the 21st Century", having been interpolated in Omarion's "Post to Be", and in XXL's list of "20 of the Most Iconic Reggae Samples in Hip-Hop", being sampled in French Montana's "Freaks". The song was also interpolated in Pitbull's "El Taxi", in Jason Derulo's "Too Hot", and in the remix version of Black Eyed Peas' "Ritmo" featuring Jaden Smith, as well as having been sampled and interpolated in many other songs.

== Writing and composition ==
The song is about abortion, as revealed in the third verse. Pliers wrote the song reflecting on being the age of 19. At the time, he was dating a girl named Maxine who told him she was pregnant, but after 6 months there was no sign of the pregnancy, waiting until 9 months and 10 months without any result of a child. The song title came from the detective series Murder, She Wrote which was a TV show Pliers used to watch and was a fan of.

The song was recorded over a 5-year span starting in 1987 with attempts from 6–7 different producers. The first version was released in 1987 by Pliers under his real name Everton Bonner, using the "Fresh" riddim sampled from Shabba Ranks' "(Original) Fresh", which was produced by Harry J for Harry J Records. A second Pliers version was released in 1988, titled "Murder We Wrote", produced by Clifton "Specialist" Dillon. Another version was then released with Jack Scorpio, and then in a separate attempt with a different group from England.

In 1992, Pliers then went to Sonic Sounds, where engineer Jason Lee was recording Sly on drums and Lloyd 'Gitzy' Willis on guitar. Chaka had recorded his part for a different song with Bobby Digital, after which the songs were combined to make "Murder She Wrote". Instead of the duo going into the recording booth, they stood over the mixing board and passed the microphone to each other; vocally it offered a new fusion with toasting on verses and melodic vocals for the hooks. The production duo Sly & Robbie had mainly been in the analog sphere of reggae, recording live instruments in more relaxed dub stylings, and entering dancehall music had them offer a digitized and energized sound with their final version of the song having been produced over a simple four-bar loop known as the "Bam Bam" riddim.

Two music videos were made, one with Dancehall Queen Carlene Smith, and one without. The videos cost $50,000 and $2,500 respectively to produce.

== Critical reception ==
Neil Spencer from The Observer complimented "the metronomic pulse" of the song. Clark Collis from Select wrote, "Through a subtle blend of ragga braggadocio and lover's rock smoothness the Jamaican duo appear to have virtually captured a nation with singles like 'Murder She Wrote', 'Bam Bam' and 'Tease Me'." Tom Doyle from Smash Hits gave the song three out of five, saying, "Chaka and his pal go for some proper ragga with this dancehall rocker like the make 'em in ole Kingston town. It's about some girl called Maxine who bubble-bubble-ribbit-bubble-wiggle-and-wriggle. Or something. Not a bad tune, especially since it might have been inspired by some ropey TV whodunnit with Angela Lansbury."

== Legacy ==
In 2007, the group performed the song alongside Alicia Keys at the 2007 American Music Awards, and 6 years later at the 2013 BET Awards alongside Elephant Man. In 2022, DJ Cassidy's Pass the Mic series had the duo perform a rendition of the song.

The song was interpolated in Rihanna's second medley performance at the 2016 MTV Video Music Awards, as part of her Video Vanguard Award win.

Actress Angela Lansbury (who starred in the TV series after which the song was named), after hearing the song finally in 2019 at the age of 93 commented "Oh, reggae! Oh, I'm thrilled to be part of reggae. Of course."

== Charts ==
Chart (1992–1994)	Peak position
Europe (Eurochart Hot 100)	72
UK Singles (OCC)	27
UK Dance (Music Week)	18
US Billboard Hot 100	57
US Hot R&B/Hip-Hop Songs (Billboard)	39
US Hot Rap Songs (Billboard)	5
US Maxi-Singles Sales (Billboard)	40

== Certifications ==
Region	Certification	Certified units/sales
United Kingdom (BPI) Sales since 2011	Gold	400,000^{‡}
^{‡} Sales+streaming figures based on certification alone.
