= Tease Me =

Tease Me may refer to:

- Tease Me (album), by Chaka Demus & Pliers
  - "Tease Me", the album's title track
- "Tease Me" (3T song)
- "Tease Me" (Sneaky Sound System song)
- "Tease Me", a song by Kesha that was leaked on the Internet
