= In the Streets to Africa =

Studio album by Richie Spice
- Released: January 27, 2007
- Recorded: 2006–2007
- Genre: Reggae
- Length: 61:15
- Label: VP Records
- Producer: Alton Smith, Andre Lue, Donovan Bennett, Christopher Clark, Dwight Lue, Delroy Foster, Stephen Gibson, Clive Hunt, Joseph Bogdanovich, Bobby Konders, Robert Livingston, Richard Myrie, Antonique Smith, Devon Wheatley

Richie Spice chronology
Spice in Your Life (2006)	In the Streets to Africa (2007)	Motherland Africa/Africa Calling (2007)

Singles from In the Streets to Africa
- 1. "Youth Dem Cold" Released: 24 December 2005

In the Streets to Africa is the fourth studio album (third released with VP Records) by Jamaican singer Richie Spice. This album featured the number 54 charting song "Youths Dem Cold" which was also featured on the Grand Theft Auto IV soundtrack. The album features vocals from Joseph Hill of the roots reggae group Culture and Richie's brothers Spanner Banner and Pliers.

== Track listing ==
All tracks written by B. Bonner unless otherwise stated.

No.	Title	Length
1.	"Get Up"	4:33
2.	"Open the Door"	3:41
3.	"Youth Dem Cold"	3:45
4.	"Babylon Gwaan"	3:01
5.	"Digital Ways" (ft. Joseph Hill of Culture)	4:34
6.	"Sunny Day"	3:38
7.	"Baby Face" (ft. Spanner Banner & Pliers)	3:36
8.	"Uptown Girl"	3:37
9.	"Brown Skin"	3:36
10.	"Groovin' My Girl"	3:47
11.	"High Grade"	3:53
12.	"Take It Easy"	3:34
13.	"Mind Off of Me"	4:06
14.	"Can't Stop Loving Jah"	3:29
15.	"Motherland Calling" (also featured on his next album of the same name)	4:38

== Reception ==
AllMusic gave the album 3 stars out of 5, and its review states that "Richie is undeniably a master of a certain variety of modern roots reggae", "listeners can probably all agree that praising a woman for her domestic skills is better than bragging about how many people he's shot", "Highlights include the brilliant sufferer's anthem "Youth Dem Cold," a very fine duo performance that features Joseph Hill (of Culture), and the sweet and simple "Take It Easy"." Whilst also saying "at times the Rastafarian version of social consciousness can sound an awful lot like retrograde conservatism to Babylonian ears" and "Less inspiring are the strangely desultory "Get Up," which opens the album, and the generic nyahbinghi repatriation anthem that ends it".

However, the BBC gave a more positive review saying "This year's 'In the Streets to Africa' has remedied all that, maintaining an unerring level of quality control and flowing end to end despite being a hefty 15 tracks long", "Like the best Jamaican singers, Spice's success comes down to being equally at ease with both religious or pan-African themes and romantic relaxation" and "the consistency of this album makes for one glorious, uninterrupted listen."

== Charts ==
- Billboard Top Reggae Albums – #6
