= Tease Me (Chaka Demus & Pliers song) =

1993 song by Chaka Demus & Pliers

Single by Chaka Demus & Pliers

from the album Tease Me
- B-side: "Nuh Betta Nuh Deh"
- Released: 1 June 1993
- Genre: Reggae
- Length: 3:41
- Label: Mango
- Songwriters: John Taylor; Everton Bonner; Joseph Bonner; Lloyd "Gitsy" Willis; Sly Dunbar; Robbie Shakespeare
- Producer: Sly & Robbie

Chaka Demus & Pliers singles chronology
"Mr Mention" (1993)	"Tease Me" (1993)	"She Don't Let Nobody" (1993)

Music video
- "Tease Me" on YouTube

"Tease Me" is a song by Jamaican reggae duo Chaka Demus & Pliers, released in June 1993 by Mango Records as the first single from their fourth album of the same name (1993). The song was produced by Sly & Robbie, who also co-wrote the lyrics, and was a top-20 hit in at least six countries, including the United Kingdom, where it peaked at No. 3 on the UK Singles Chart.

== Critical reception ==
Larry Flick from Billboard magazine wrote, "Leave it to this savvy duo to find a different route for its pop-drenched reggae attitude. Hip-shaking staccato beats are prominent in an arrangement of loopy horns and playful vocals. In its original form, this bright and sunny tune will breathe fresh air into any station it graces." In his weekly UK chart commentary, James Masterton noted, "Latest ragga hit to come out of nowhere is this one. From the Shabba Ranks school of mellow laidback dancehall it makes a startling debut." Ian McCann from NME said, "Usual stuff about dancing and fun, and maybe hampered radio-wise by Chaka reaching a climax in the first verse. But a wonderful record, as magical as several ducks flying over in the twilight, and a hit as big as a planet. Pluto, perhaps."

Neil Spencer from The Observer complimented the song as "itchy". Brad Beatnik from the Record Mirror Dance Update commented, "The waves caused by Shaggy and this duo's previous hit "Murder She Wrote" should make this a surefire crossover hit. Its sparse rhythm and chugging chorus will make it irresistible on the floor." Another Record Mirror editor, James Hamilton, described it as "deceptively fast mid-Sixties ska sample based crooning and toasting bouncy light cool reggae breeze". Siân Pattenden from Smash Hits gave "Tease Me" three out of five, noting that "this has a "backbeat" that's something else and a gloppy Indian drum which sets it apart. Music you go down to the wilderness of the country to."

== Music video ==
A music video was produced to promote the single. It depicts the duo performing in Jamaica. Other scenes show them driving around in a red car or performing on the beach. Female dancers follow the duo. In between, there is footage of different people and scenes of the daily life in the city. The video was A-listed on France's MCM in November 1994.

== Track listings ==
- US 12-inch and maxi-cassette single

A1. "Tease Me" (album version) – 4:06
A2. "Tease Me" (Gitsmo mix) – 4:13
A3. "Tease Me" (drum & bass mix) – 3:53
B1. "Tease Me" (Massive Sounds mix) – 4:09
B2. "Tease Me" (Jungle Fever mix) – 4:16
B3. "Nuh Betta Nuh Deh" – 4:00

- UK 12-inch single

A1. "Tease Me" – 3:41
A2. "Tease Me" (Jungle Fever mix) – 4:09
B1. "Friday Evening" – 3:56
B2. "Murder She Wrote" – 4:06

- UK 7-inch and cassette single
1. "Tease Me" – 3:41
2. "Friday Evening" – 3:56
- UK CD and Australia single
1. "Tease Me" – 3:41
2. "Friday Evening" – 3:56
3. "Murder She Wrote" – 4:06
4. "Tease Me" (Jungle Fever mix) – 4:09
- European maxi-CD single
1. "Tease Me" – 3:41
2. "Friday Evening" – 3:56
3. "Tease Me" (Jungle Fever mix) – 4:09

== Charts ==
=== Weekly charts ===
Chart (1993–1994)	Peak position
Australia (ARIA)	5
Austria (Ö3 Austria Top 40)	11
Belgium (Ultratop 50 Flanders)	16
Europe (Eurochart Hot 100)	14
Europe (European Dance Radio)	1
Europe (European Hit Radio)	26
France (SNEP)	47
Germany (GfK)	31
Ireland (IRMA)	16
Netherlands (Dutch Top 40)	4
Netherlands (Single Top 100)	5
New Zealand (Recorded Music NZ)	15
Sweden (Sverigetopplistan)	22
UK Singles (OCC)	3
UK Airplay (Music Week)	13
UK Dance (Music Week)	2
UK Club Chart (Music Week)	23

=== Year-end charts ===
Chart (1993)	Position
Australia (ARIA)	37
Europe (Eurochart Hot 100)	60
Europe (European Dance Radio)	1
Netherlands (Dutch Top 40)	26
Netherlands (Single Top 100)	38
Sweden (Topplistan)	77
UK Singles (OCC)	13
UK Airplay (Music Week)	44

== Certifications ==
Region	Certification	Certified units/sales
Australia (ARIA)	Gold	35,000^{^}
United Kingdom (BPI)	Gold	400,000^{^}
^{^} Shipments figures based on certification alone.
