= Bashment =

Bashment may refer to:

- Bashment, another name for dancehall, a type of Jamaican popular music that developed around 1979
- Bashment, a 2011 movie by Rikki Beadle-Blair, about a gay bashing at a reggae festival
- Bashment Time, an album by Grammy Award-winning Jamaican singer for kids Father Goose
- "Bashment Boogie," a song by Roots Manuva, produced by Lotek from his 2001 album Run Come Save Me
- Bashment, a play by British playwright Rikki Beadle-Blair, exploring the controversy around dancehall reggae music and the consequences of homophobic lyrics
- Junko Kudō, Junko "Bashment" Kudo, 2002 dancer from Japan
- The Bashments, a Reggae, Rocksteady, Ska group from Ontario California on Mossburg Music Label
