= Better Tomorrow =

Better Tomorrow or A Better Tomorrow may refer to:

== Media ==
- A Better Tomorrow, a 1986 Hong Kong action film by John Woo
- A Better Tomorrow (2010 film), a South Korean remake of the 1986 film
- A Better Tomorrow 2018, a Chinese remake of the 1986 film
- Better Tomorrow (TV series), a 2016 Burmese TV series
- Better Tomorrow (album), a 2013 studio album by Etana
- A Better Tomorrow (album), a 2014 studio album by Wu-Tang Clan
- "A Better Tomorrow", a song on the 1997 album Wu-Tang Forever by Wu-Tang Clan
- A Better Tomorrow can also refer to branding used by British American Tobacco for their sponsorship with McLaren Formula One team.

== Other ==
- Better Tomorrow, a nonprofit organization involved with the Rockbridge Network

== See also ==
- Colbert Super PAC, officially Americans for a Better Tomorrow, Tomorrow
