= Olurotimi =

- Gender: Male
- Language: Yoruba

Origin
- Meaning: God stays with me
- Region of origin: Southwest of Nigeria

Other names
- Variant forms: Rotimi, Timi

Olurotimi or Oluwarotimi is a Yoruba name meaning "God stays with me"

Olarotimi means "Wealth stays with me".

== People with the name ==
- Oluwarotimi Odunayo Akeredolu (born 1956), Nigerian politician
- Joseph Olurotimi Sanya, Nigerian doctor
- Rotimi (actor) (Olurotimi Akinosho), American singer-songwriter, actor and model

== See also ==
- Rotimi
