= I Know You Love Me =

I Know You Love Me may refer to:

- "I Know You Love Me", a song by Etana from Free Expressions, 2011
- "I Know You Love Me", a song by Heavy D from Heavy, 1999
- "I Know You Love Me", a song by Michelle Bai
- "I Know You Love Me", a song by Rachelle Ferrell from Rachelle Ferrell, 1992
- "I Know You Love Me", a song by Sharon O'Neill from Edge of Winter, 1990
- "I Know You Love Me", a song by Smoking Popes from Destination Failure, 1997
- "I Know You Love Me", a song by Trinere, 1984
