= Soul Legacy =

2001 box set by Curtis Mayfield

Box set by Curtis Mayfield
- Released: July 24, 2001
- Genre: Funk/Soul
- Label: Curtom

Professional ratings
Review scores
Source	Rating
AllMusic	4.5/5 stars

Soul Legacy is a box set of Curtis Mayfield hits. Five years after Mayfield's box set People Get Ready: The Curtis Mayfield Story was released in the United States, this more comprehensive collection was released in the UK. Unlike its predecessor, the track list for this set is not in chronological order, instead opting for thematic divisions.

== Track listing ==
Disc 1 (Inspirational Themes)

1. "Move on Up"
2. "Keep On Pushing" - The Impressions, Curtis Mayfield
3. "We're a Winner"
4. "People Get Ready"
5. "I Plan to Stay a Believer"
6. "We the People Who Are Darker Than Blue"
7. "Everybody Needs a Friend"
8. "It's All Right"
9. "Need Someone to Love"
10. "Something to Believe In"
11. "So in Love"
12. "People Never Give Up"
13. "This Year"
14. "Wild and Free"
15. "We Got to Have Peace"
16. "Make Me Believe in You"
17. "Beautiful Brother of Mine"
18. "Miss Black America"
19. "Keep on Keeping On"

Disc 2 (Love Songs)

1. "Gypsy Woman" - The Impressions, Curtis Mayfield
2. "You're Really Something Sadie" - The Impressions, Curtis Mayfield
3. "I've Been Trying" - The Impressions, Curtis Mayfield
4. "Fool for You" - The Impressions, Curtis Mayfield
5. "Wherever She Leadeth Me" - The Impressions, Curtis Mayfield
6. "Gone Away" - The Impressions, Curtis Mayfield
7. "Seven Years" - The Impressions, Curtis Mayfield
8. "I'm So Proud" - The Impressions, Curtis Mayfield
9. "So Unusual" - The Impressions, Curtis Mayfield
10. "Just Want to Be With You"
11. "Show Me Love"
12. "You Mean Everything to Me"
13. "Hey Baby (Give It All to Me)"
14. "You're So Good to Me"
15. "Between You Baby and Me" - Linda Clifford, Curtis Mayfield
16. "Only You Babe"
17. "I'm Gonna Win Your Love"
18. "Ain't No Love Lost" - Linda Clifford, Curtis Mayfield
19. "Baby It's You"
20. "So You Don't Love Me"
21. "Still Within Your Heart"

Disc 3 (Cautionary Tales)

1. "(Don't Worry) If There's a Hell Below, We're All Going to Go" [Edit]
2. "Mighty Mighty (Spade and Whitey)" - The Impressions, Curtis Mayfield
3. "Check Out Your Mind" - The Impressions, Curtis Mayfield
4. "Underground"
5. "Future Shock"
6. "If I Were Only a Child Again"
7. "To Be Invisible"
8. "Mother's Son"
9. "They Don't Know" - The Impressions, Curtis Mayfield
10. "Choice of Colors" - The Impressions, Curtis Mayfield
11. "This Is My Country" - The Impressions, Curtis Mayfield
12. "Back to the World"
13. "Homeless"
14. "Cannot Find a Way"
15. "Dirty Laundry"
16. "I Mo Git U Sucka"
17. "Kung Fu"
18. "Hard Times"
19. "When Seasons Change"

Disc 4 (Film & Dance)

1. "Superfly"
2. "Billy Jack"
3. "Eddie You Should Know Better"
4. "Do Do Wap is Strong in Here"
5. "Short Eyes/Freak, Free, Free, Free"
6. "Pusherman"
7. "Freddie's Dead"
8. "Tripping Out"
9. "Get Down"
10. "Party Night"
11. "Do It All Night"
12. "You Are, You Are"
13. "Toot An' Toot An' Toot"
14. "Soul Music"
15. "Do Be Down"
16. "She Don't Let Nobody (But Me)"
17. "Can't Say Nothin'"
18. "Ain't Got Time"
