= Dutty Wine =

Jamaican dance

The Dutty Wine is a Jamaican dance, typically performed by young women. The dance originated in Jamaica as with many other dances like "Log on" and "Screechie". There are several dancers in Jamaica who claim they were its creator, among them a dancehall queen named Mad Michelle who refers to a video recording from 2003. The Dutty Wine was popularized in 2006 via a #1 song of the same name by dancehall artist Tony Matterhorn recorded on the album Smash riddim. The name was created in Jamaica.

== Dutty Wine culture ==
Although Mad Michelle is a possible creator of the Dutty Wine, the packaged concept of the Dutty Wine came from a trio in Montego Bay named The Attitude Girls. Dancehall Queen Shalara Gayle of The Attitude Girls is most famous for doing the fastest and longest Dutty Wine Dance.

== The dance ==
The dance involves a rotating movement of the neck ("wine" refers to winding, or gyration.) The dancer can also move their legs like a bird, while simultaneously rotating their wrists, neck, and posterior. Sometimes more advanced dancers will include splits in their Dutty Wine.

The dance experienced a surge of popularity around the world, especially in communities in parts of the United Kingdom and North America. Some even have gone so far as to label it as "the dance craze" of 2006.

== Health risks ==
Some doctors have warned against performing the Dutty Wine, claiming it may cause serious muscle trauma, and ligament damage; it has the reputation of causing neck injury.

== Charts ==
=== Weekly charts ===
Weekly chart performance for "Dutty Wine"
Chart (2006)	Peak position
US Bubbling Under Hot 100 Singles (Billboard)	24
US Hot Rap Songs (Billboard)	17
US Hot R&B/Hip-Hop Songs (Billboard)	31

== See also ==
- Headbanging
