= Free Expressions =

Studio album by Etana
- Released: February 8, 2011
- Genre: Reggae
- Label: VP Records

Free Expressions is a studio album by Jamaican reggae female singer Etana, released on February 8, 2011, under VP Records. Free Expressions contains a pop-reggae sound, soul inspired vocals, and personal lyrics on one drop riddims with rock flavored instrumentation. Etana's debut The Strong One (VP1800) garnered multiple hits and established Etana as a fresh new female voice on the international scene.

== Executive producer ==
Chris Chin

== Track List ==
| No. | Title | Artist | Producer(s) | Writer(s) |
|---|---|---|---|---|
| 1 | Free | Etana | Kemar "Flava" McGregor For No Doubt Records | Shauna McKenzie / Kemar McGregor |
| 2 | Mocking Bird | Etana | Kemar "Flava" McGregor For No Doubt Records | Shauna McKenzie / Leon Moody / Kemar McGregor / Stefan Warren / Lamont Savory |
| 3 | People Talk | Etana | Rohan Dwyer For Groove Crusader Productions & Clifton "Specialist" Dillon | C. Dexter / Rohan Dwyer / Shauna McKenzie / Clifton Dillon |
| 4 | Heart Broken | Etana | Curtis Lynch Jr. & Augustus "Gussie" Clarke | Shauna McKenzie / Leon Moody / Curtis Lynch Jr. / Augustus Clarke |
| 5 | I Know You Love Me | Etana | Kemar "Flava" McGregor For No Doubt Records | Shauna McKenzie / Awa Manneh / Kemar McGregor / Stephan Warren / Ivor Lindo / Devon Merredy |
| 6 | I Got You | Etana | Clifton Dillon & Alberto D'ascola | Shauna McKenzie / Alberto D'ascola / Clifton Dillon / T. Tarantino |
| 7 | My Name Is | Etana | Stephen Stanley | Pushim / S. Mori |
| 8 | Moving On | Etana | Curtis Lynch Jr. For Necessary Mayhem | Shauna McKenxie / Curtis Lynch Jr. |
| 9 | 96 Degrees | Etana Featuring The Tamlins | C. Dillon & A. D'ascola | S. McKenzie / A. Clarke / M. Cooper / H. Coore |
| 10 | War | Etana | Patrick Samuels | Shauna McKenzie / Andre Daley / Patrick Samuels |
| 11 | Retribution | Etana | Steven Stanley | Shauna McKenzie / John Steven Stanley |
| 12 | August Town | Etana | Curtis Lynch Jr. For Necessary Mayhem | Shauna McKenzie / Curtis Lynch Jr. |
| 13 | Venting | Etana | Curtis Lynch Jr. For Necessary Mayhem | Shauna McKenzie / Curtis Lynch Jr. |
| 14 | Day By Day | Etana | Joel Chin | B. Grant / Joel Chin / Shauna McKenzie |
