= Anoyd =

American rapper (born 1992)

- Anoyd at the 2025 Sundance Film Festival

Background information
- Born: Dashorn Whitehead; August 6, 1992 (age 34)
- Origin: Bloomfield, Connecticut
- Genre: Hip-hop
- Occupations: Rapper; singer; songwriter
- Years active: 2015–present
- Labels: Audio BRGNDI; EightyHD; Showoff Records
- Website: brgndi.com

Dashorn Whitehead (born August 6, 1992), better known by his stage name Anoyd, is an American rapper and singer from Bloomfield, Connecticut. He is the son of reggae musician Chuck Fenda. He performed at the 2017 SXSW music festival. In 2018, he appeared on Sway in the Morning and performed a “5 Fingers of Death” freestyle. In 2019, he released the album Yuck! with producer Statik Selektah. He has collaborated on songs with fellow Connecticut based rappers Chris Webby and Apathy.

== Discography ==
=== Albums ===
- Summer in Sinsinati (2015)
- Once in a Brgndi Moon (2016)
- Autumn in Sinsinati (2016)
- A Time and Place (2017)
- Blame It on Jay Z (2018)
- Yuck! (with Statik Selektah)(2019)
- Oxblood (2022)
- Paranoyd (2023)
- Love You More (2024)
- Wtfip (2026)
