= Spanner Banner =

- Born: Joseph Bonner; 6 February 1969 (age 56); St. Andrew, Jamaica
- Genres: Reggae; dancehall
- Years active: Late 1980s–present
- Labels: Techniques; Island; Heartbeat; VP; Bonner Yard Productions

Joseph Bonner, also commonly known by the nickname Spanner Banner, is a Jamaican reggae and dancehall musician. He is one of the Bonner brothers, all of whom are successful reggae artists, including Pliers, Richie Spice, and Snatcha Lion.

== Biography ==
Bonner was born on 6 February in 1969, in the rural area of Rock Hall, St. Andrew, Jamaica. The brother of fellow reggae stars Pliers, Richie Spice, and Snatcha Lion, Bonner began his career in the late 1980s on the Bidia sound system in St. Andrew, and had hits with songs such as "Life Goes On" with producer Winston Riley. He co-wrote Chaka Demus and Pliers' chart-topping "Tease Me", and rose to prominence himself in the mid-1990s with albums on RAS (Now and Forever) and Island Jamaica (Chill), working with Sly and Robbie on the latter. He went on to release the Real Love album in 2001 on Heartbeat Records, featuring contributions from Tanya Stephens, Lady Saw, and Sean Paul among others.

After relocating to England for a few years, Bonner returned to Jamaica and found success again. In 2009, he returned to the charts with the Donovan Germain-produced "Rolling Stones", and won the 'Biggest Comeback Artiste' award at the 2010 EME Awards. In 2011 he set up the Bonner Yard Productions record label.

In February 2014, he announced plans to release a new album, to be preceded by an EP in March.

== Discography ==
=== Albums ===
- Now and Forever (1994), RAS
- Chill (1995), Island Jamaica
- Lover's Story (1998), Sweet Angel
- Real Love (2001), Heartbeat
- Clean Up Your Actions (2008), Clive Hunt/Ugly Man
- I'm a Winner (2009), Bonner Cornerstone/VP

=== Compilations ===
- Life Goes On (1990), Techniques
- Greatest Hits (2001), Jet Star
