= Honesty (Curtis Mayfield album) =

Studio album by Curtis Mayfield
- Released: 1983
- Genre: Funk, soul
- Length: 33:47
- Label: Boardwalk Label
- Producer: Curtis Mayfield

Curtis Mayfield chronology
Love is the Place (1982)	Honesty (1983)	We Come in Peace with a Message of Love (1985)

Professional ratings
Review scores
Source	Rating
Allmusic	3/5 stars

Honesty is a 1983 album by Curtis Mayfield.

== Track listing ==
All songs written and produced by Curtis Mayfield.

No.	Title	Length
1.	"Hey Baby"	4:42
2.	"Still Within Your Heart"	4:24
3.	"Dirty Laundry"	4:07
4.	"Nobody but You"	4:41
5.	"If You Need Me"	5:06
6.	"What You Gawn Do"	5:25
7.	"Summer Hot"	5:13

== Personnel ==
- Curtis Mayfield - vocals, guitar, backing vocals
- Michael Ingram - percussion
- Joseph Scott - bass
- Rich Tufo - clavinet, electric piano
- Theodis Rodgers - organ, piano, synthesizer
- Charles "Skip" Lane - alto & baritone saxophone, flute
- William Puett - alto saxophone, flute
- Curtis Mayfield III - flute
- David Arenz - violin
- Christopher Rex - cello
- Frances Jeffrey - violin
- Harry Hagan - trombone
- George Rawlin - trumpet
- Ronald Mendola - trumpet
- Peter Bertolino - viola
- Morris Jennings - drums
- Nella Rigell-Colson - harp
- Jay Norem - harmonica on "Dirty Laundry"

Technical

- Richard Wells - engineer
- Jim Salvati - cover illustration
