= Rotimi =

- Language: Yoruba

Origin
- Origin: Yorubaland
- Meaning: Stay with me
- Region of origin: Yorubaland [Nigeria, Benin, Togo]

Other names
- Related names: Olarotimi, Olurotimi, Akinrotimi, Aderotimi

Rotimi // is a name of Yoruba origin which means 'stay with me'. It is also a diminutive of names such as Olarotimi ('wealth stays with me'), Aderotimi ('crown/royalty stays with me'), Olurotimi ('God/my lord stays with me'), Akinrotimi ('warrior/valour stays with me'), Ayorotimi (joy stays with me), etc.

== People ==
Notable people with the name include:

=== Mononym ===
- Rotimi (actor) (born 1988), American singer-songwriter, actor and model

=== Given name ===
- Rotimi Adebari (born 1964), Nigerian-born Irish politician
- Rotimi Adelola (born 1958), Nigerian psychologist and film producer
- Rotimi Akeredolu (born 1956), Nigerian politician
- Rotimi Alakija (born 1980), British-Nigerian disc jockey, record producer and recording artist known professionally as DJ Xclusive
- Rotimi Amaechi (born 1965), Nigerian politician
- Rotimi Babatunde, Nigerian writer and playwright
- Rotimi Fani-Kayode (1955–1989), Nigerian-born British photographer
- Rotimi Peters (born 1955), Nigerian sprint runner
- Rotimi Rainwater (born 1970), American writer, director, and producer
- Rotimi Salami, Nigerian actor and film producer
- Rotimi Segun (born 1996), English rugby union player
- Rotimi Jaiyesimi, Nigerian medical doctor

=== Middle name ===
Listed alphabetically by surname

- Isaac Rotimi Ajayi (born 1965), Nigerian university administrator
- Thanasis Rotimi Antetokounmpo (born 1992), Greek professional basketball player
- Peter Rotimi Oludipe, Anglican bishop in Nigeria
- Frederick Rotimi Williams (1920–2005), Nigerian lawyer

=== Surname ===
- Bunmi Rotimi (born 1995), American football player
- Charles Rotimi (born 1957), Nigerian scientist
- Christopher Oluwole Rotimi (born 1935), Nigerian general, diplomat and politician
- Ola Rotimi (1938–2000), Nigerian playwrights and theatre director
- Sunday Rotimi (born 1980), Nigerian football goalkeeper

== See also ==
- Rotini, a type of pasta
