= Carlene Smith =

Jamaican dancer

- Born: Carlene Smith; 1 May 1973 (age 51); Kingston, Jamaica
- Other names: Dancehall Queen Carlene
- Occupations: Dancer; socialite
- Years active: 1990–2001
- Children: 1

Carlene Smith (born 1 May 1973), also known as Dancehall Queen Carlene, is a Jamaican former dancer and socialite. Beginning her career in the early 1990s, Smith is credited as Jamaica's first Dancehall Queen.

== Biography ==
=== Career ===
Smith was crowned Dancehall Queen in 1992 after she and her crew competed against well known models in Jamaica. Prior to her being crowned, there had been other dancehall queens, but Smith started the national spotlight on a reign that was usually isolated to the Jamaican garrisons. Smith appeared in the 1992 music video for the Chaka Demus & Pliers song Murder She Wrote, wearing a gold outfit and blonde wig. Smith was also featured in other music videos before and after her appearance on the dancehall video "Murder She Wrote". Smith was also featured in a 1997 issue of Vibe where she was credited for the International Butterfly Dance and explains her endorsement of Slam Condoms.

=== Personal life ===
Smith had a longtime relationship and a daughter with popular DJ Beenie Man.
