= Baddest Girl in Town =

Single by Pitbull featuring Mohombi and Wisin

from the album Dale
- Released: June 8, 2015
- Recorded: 2015
- Genre: Reggaeton, Latin Pop
- Length: 3:04
- Label: Mr. 305; RCA
- Songwriters: Mohombi Moupondo; Juan Luis Morera Luna; Alexandru Cotoi; Armando C. Perez; Mika Moupondo; José C. García; Jorge Gómez
- Producers: Alexandru Cotoi; Mika Moupondo

Pitbull singles chronology
| "Back It Up" (2015) | "Baddest Girl in Town" (2015) | "Shake That" (2015) |

Mohombi singles chronology
| "Universe" (2014) | "Baddest Girl in Town" (2015) | "Balans" (2016) |

Wisin singles chronology
| "Dale Frontu" (2015) | "Baddest Girl in Town" (2015) | "Rumba" (2015) |

"Baddest Girl in Town" is the third single from American rapper Pitbull's ninth studio album Dale, which won the Grammy Award for Best Latin Rock, Urban or Alternative Album. The track features singer Mohombi and reggaeton rapper Wisin.

== Music video ==
The music video for the song features six models in fishnet stockings and corsets storming into a bank and robbing it at gunpoint, then fleeing on motorcycles and evading police pursuit until they reach Pitbull, who is waiting for them on a boat.

== Charts ==
| Chart (2015) | Peak position |
|---|---|
| Spain (Promusicae) | 36 |
| US Hot Latin Songs (Billboard) | 12 |
| US Latin Pop Airplay (Billboard) | 11 |
| US Latin Airplay (Billboard) | 8 |
| US Latin Rhythm Airplay (Billboard) | 6 |

== Certifications ==
| Region | Certification | Certified units/sales |
|---|---|---|
| Mexico (AMPROFON) | Gold | 30,000^{‡} |
^{‡} Sales+streaming figures based on certification alone.
