= Etana (musician) =

Jamaican singer

Etana OD
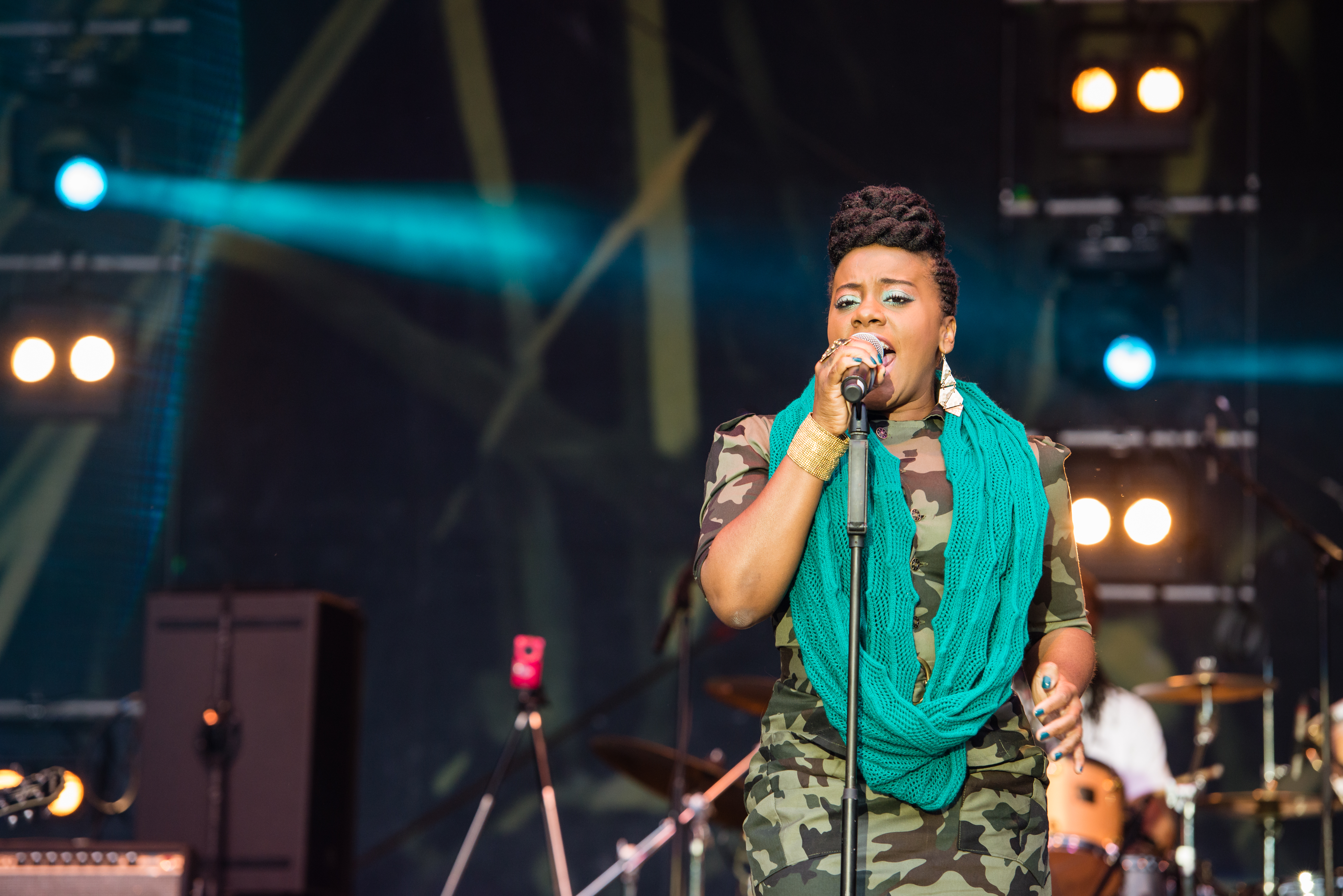
- Etana at Ruhr Reggae Summer 2014

Background information
- Also known as: Etana
- Born: Shauna Melissa McKenzie; 22 May 1983 (age 42); Kingston, Jamaica
- Genres: Reggae, dancehall
- Occupations: Singer-songwriter, record producer, guitarist
- Years active: 2008–present
- Label: Freemind Music Records
- Website: etanamusic.com

Shauna Melissa McKenzie (born 22 May 1983), known by her stage name Etana, is a Jamaican reggae singer. Her debut studio album, The Strong One, was released in June 2008. In December 2018, Etana was nominated for the 61st & 64th Annual Grammy Awards for Best Reggae Album.

== Biography ==
Born Shauna McKenzie in Kingston, Jamaica, the only girl in a family of boys, Etana grew up in the eastern Saint Andrew community of August Town. Her vocal talent was discovered when she was eight years old and was overheard singing along to a 1991 hit by the group Air Supply.

Etana migrated to the United States in 1992. attend Broward Community College with the intention of becoming a registered nurse.

=== Beginnings (2000–2005) ===
Following her decision to prematurely exit college in 2000, Etana joined a female vocal group named Gift. At the time Universal Records was interested in their music so Etana reluctantly agreed to wear the skimpy outfits dictated by the music industry's pervasive stereotyping of female artists; then one day, she could no longer conform.

Etana returned to her birthplace and focused on making music that reflected her embracement of Rastafari principles, which include a royal representation of women, adhering to a natural lifestyle, and an acknowledgment of the teachings of Marcus Garvey and Emperor Haile Selassie I. That opportunity arrived in 2005 when a friend brought her to Kingston's Fifth Element Records, who were then enjoying success with Richie Spice's single "Earth A Run Red" and his album Spice in Your Life. Etana successfully auditioned to become one of Spice's vocalists on his tour of Europe and North America.

=== The Strong One (2007–2009) ===
While in the studio with the guitarist and percussionist from Spice's band, Etana put together the song "Wrong Address". Fusing acoustic folk with roots reggae rhythms and strains of neo-soul influences "Wrong Address" was based on the experience of Etana's aunt being told to lie about where she lived to gain employment. The single received heavy radio rotation, reaching the number one position on several Jamaican charts.

Etana's second major hit "Roots" was inspired by her travels to Africa (her very first solo performance was in Ghana).

The remainder of the songs on her debut album The Strong One, presents an eclectic mix of Etana's ideas and influences, which include Air Supply, Dolly Parton, Bob Marley and Sizzla.

Etana was nominated for the 2008 MOBO Awards in the 'Best Reggae' category.

=== Free Expressions and Better Tomorrow (2011–2013) ===
Etana released her second album, Free Expressions, in 2011. She toured Europe in 2012.

Her third album, the Shane Brown-produced Better Tomorrow was recorded mainly at Tuff Gong studios in 2012 and was released in February 2013. It was preceded by a US tour.

In 2013 she recorded the duet "If Tomorrow Never Comes" with New Zealand singer Swiss, which hit the New Zealand top 50, eventually climbing to the number one position for more than one week.

Her fourth album, the Clive Hunt-produced I Rise, was released in October 2014 and entered the Billboard Top Reggae Albums chart at number 7, and topped the chart in its second week of release. It remained at the number one spot for four weeks. Etana is the first female to top the reggae Billboard chart in over fifteen years.

=== Reggae Forever ===
Etana executively produced her fifth album, Reggae Forever, which was released in March 2018 and distributed by Tad's Records. Reggae Forever remained at number one on the Billboard reggae albums chart for two consecutive weeks. This makes Etana the first female in more than two decades, in Reggae, to gain top position twice on the chart. With her 2018 album Reggae Forever, she became the first female in over two decades to be nominated for a Grammy in the Best Reggae Album category.

== Discography ==
- The Strong One (2008), VP – US Reggae no. 12
- Free Expressions (2011 Feb), VP – US Reggae no. 11
- Better Tomorrow (2013), VP – US Reggae no. 7
- I Rise (2014), VP – US Reggae no. 1
- Reggae Forever (2018), Freemind Music/Tads Records US Reggae no. 1
- Dimensions (2019), Freemind Music – US Reggae no. 7
