= Love Is the Place =

Studio album by Curtis Mayfield
- Released: 1982
- Genre: Funk, soul
- Length: 36:13
- Label: Curtom
- Producer: Curtis Mayfield, Dino Fekaris

Curtis Mayfield chronology
The Right Combination (with Linda Clifford) (1980)	Love Is the Place (1982)	Honesty (1983)

Professional ratings
Review scores
Source	Rating
AllMusic	2/5 stars
Robert Christgau	B

Love Is the Place is an album by Curtis Mayfield.

== Track listing ==
All tracks are written by Curtis Mayfield, except where noted.

No.	Title	Writer(s)	Length
1.	"She Don't Let Nobody (But Me)"	Mayfield, Dino Fekaris	4:14
2.	"Toot an' Toot an' Toot"		4:07
3.	"Babydoll"		5:30
4.	"Love Is the Place"	Dino Fekaris	5:00
5.	"Just Ease My Mind"		4:27
6.	"You Mean Everything to Me"		4:50
7.	"You Get All My Love"		3:38
8.	"Come Free Your People"		4:13

== Personnel ==
- Curtis Mayfield - vocals, guitar
- Fred Tackett, Michael Sembello - guitar
- Dennis Belfield - bass
- David Loeb - keyboards
- Paulinho da Costa - percussion
- Carlos Vega - drums
- Efrain Toro - marimba, vibraphone
- Sam Small - Theremin
- Julia Tillman Waters, Luther Waters, Maxine Willard Waters, Oren Waters, Dino Fekaris - backing vocals
- Gene Page - string and horn arrangements

Technical

- Christopher Whorf - album design
- Harry Langdon - photography
