= Tease Me (album) =

Studio album by Chaka Demus & Pliers
- Released: July 1993
- Genre: Reggae; dancehall
- Label: Mango Records

Chaka Demus & Pliers chronology
Ruff This Year (1992)	Tease Me (1993)	For Every Kinda People (1996)

Singles from Tease Me
- 1. "Murder She Wrote" Released: 1992 / 1993; 2. "Tease Me" Released: 11 June 1993; 3. "I Wanna Be Your Man" Released: 1993; 4. "She Don't Let Nobody" Released: 1993; 5. "Twist and Shout" Released: 17 December 1993; 6. "Gal Wine" Released: 1994

Professional ratings
Review scores
Source	Rating
NME	7/10
Select	4/5 medals
Smash Hits	3/5 stars

Tease Me (titled All That She Wrote internationally) is the fourth album by Jamaican reggae duo Chaka Demus & Pliers, released in 1993 by Mango Records. It peaked at number one on the UK Albums Chart and was a one-hit wonder there. All six singles from the album were top 30 hits in the UK, with "Twist and Shout" reaching number one on the UK Singles Chart.

== Track listing ==
Songs written by John Taylor (Chaka Demus), Everton Bonner (Pliers), Lloyd Willis, Sly Dunbar and Robbie Shakespeare, unless otherwise noted.

1. "Tease Me"
2. "She Don't Let Nobody" (Curtis Mayfield, Dino Fekaris)
3. "Nuh Betta Nuh Deh"
4. "Bam Bam" (Frederick Hibbert)
5. "Friday Evening"
6. "Let's Make It Tonight"
7. "One Nation Under a Groove" (Gary Shider, George Clinton, Walter Morrison)
8. "Tracy"
9. "Sunshine Day"
10. "Murder She Wrote" (Bonner, Taylor, Willis, Dunbar)
11. "Roadrunner"
12. "I Wanna Be Your Man"
13. "Twist and Shout" (Phil Medley, Bert Berns)
14. "Gal Wine"

== Charts ==
Chart (1993–1994)	Peak position
Australia Albums (ARIA)	45
New Zealand (RIANZ)	6
UK Albums (OCC)	1
