= Dancehall Queen Stacey =

Jamaican dancehall queen

- Born: Denise Cumberland; Jamaica
- Years active: 1999–2000

Denise Cumberland, known under the performance name of Dancehall Queen Stacey, is a Jamaican dancer who was crowned Dancehall Queen there in 1999.

== Biography ==
Denise Cumberland (a.k.a. Dancehall Queen Stacey) was born in Cockburn Gardens, Jamaica.

== Artistic career ==
Dancehall Queen Stacey has toured with Patra and can also be seen dancing in the 1999 dancehall video "Girl's Prayer" by Beenie Man.
