= Richie Spice =

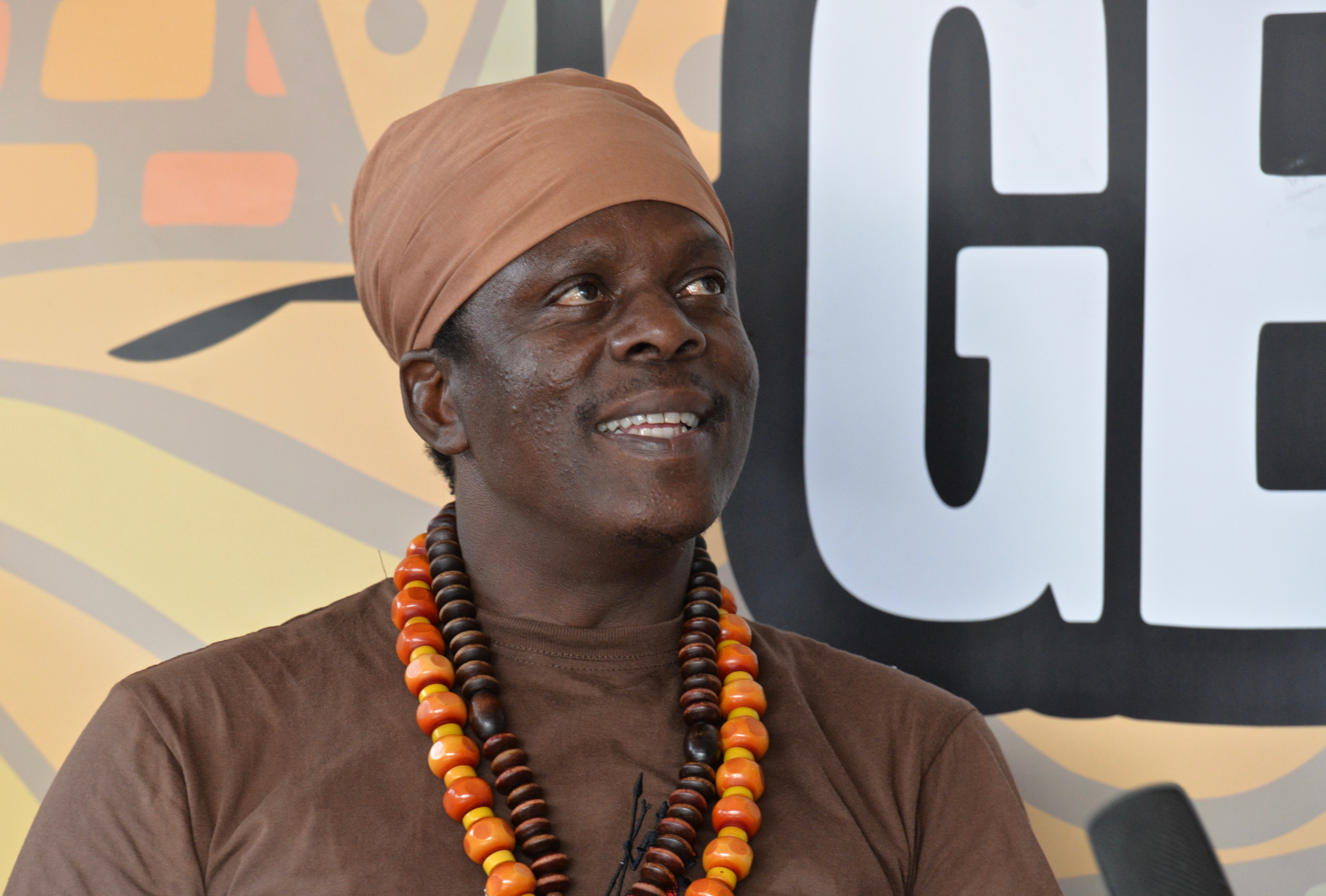
- Richie Spice in 2019

Background information
- Born: Richell Bonner; 8 September 1971 (age 55); Saint Andrew Parish, Jamaica
- Genre: Reggae
- Instrument: Vocals
- Years active: Late 1990s–present
- Labels: Heartbeat, VP, Bonner Cornerstone
- Website: elementmusicgroup.org

Richell Bonner (born 8 September 1971), better known as Richie Spice, is a Jamaican reggae artist. He is a member of the Rastafari movement. Some of his most famous songs include, "Brown Skin", "Youth Dem Cold Rel Bad", "Grooving' My Girl", "Earth a Run Red", "Marijuana" ,"The Plane Land" and "King and Queen" (which he did with Barbadian Queen of Soca Alison Hinds). Three of his brothers are also reggae artists – Pliers, Spanner Banner and Snatcha Lion.

== Biography ==
Bonner was born in Rock Hall, St. Andrew, Jamaica. He is the brother of Pliers, Spanner Banner and Snatcha Lion. His first Jamaican single "Killing a Sound" was produced by Dennis "Star" Hayes. This was followed by "Shine", produced by Clive Hunt. Bonner also teamed up with Hunt for his debut album on the Island Jamaica label from which came his first major hit "Grooving my girl". His second album included hits such as "Earth a Run Red", "Living Ain't Easy", "Land of Jamaica", "Time So Rough", the aforementioned "Grooving My Girl" and many others.

Having gained popularity in the mid-1990s, Bonner has performed at major shows such as Reggae Sunsplash, White River Reggae Bash, Rebel Salute and many others. Bonner opened shows for the likes of Chaka Demus and Pliers, Spanner Banner and Rita Marley (widow of the late Bob Marley) on extensive tours of Europe and the United States during 1996-1997.

He again toured East North America from June to September 2001. He performed at Sting held at Jam World, St. Catherine (26 December 2002) and Sting Miami (March 2003).

More recently, a remix of one of his more popular tracks, "Marijuana", by Digital Mystikz's Coki, renamed "Burnin'" has focused more attention to him in the blossoming dubstep scene coming out of the UK. The original version of "Marijuana" also appears on the These Are Serious Times modern reggae compilation on XL Recordings.

His song "Youth Dem Cold" was featured on Grand Theft Auto IV's Massive B Soundsytem 96.9 and the ending sound track of Attack the Block.

Bonner chose Book of Job as the title for his fifth album, released on 22 February 2011 on VP Records, stating that his commitment to creating uplifting music is as unwavering as Job's faith was while enduring his many hardships.

Richie Spice Acoustic - Soothing Sounds, was released in October 2012 and featured musicians such as Robbie Shakespeare and Bongo Herman.

Album Together We Stand was released on VP Records on 12 June 2020 and featured lead track 'Together We Stand" and "Valley of Jehoshaphat (Red Hot)".

He also runs the Bonner Cornerstone label with his brothers.

Richie Spice is a supporter of Food For the Poor (FFP) Jamaica, and gives a proportion of the proceeds from his performances to the charity.

== Discography ==
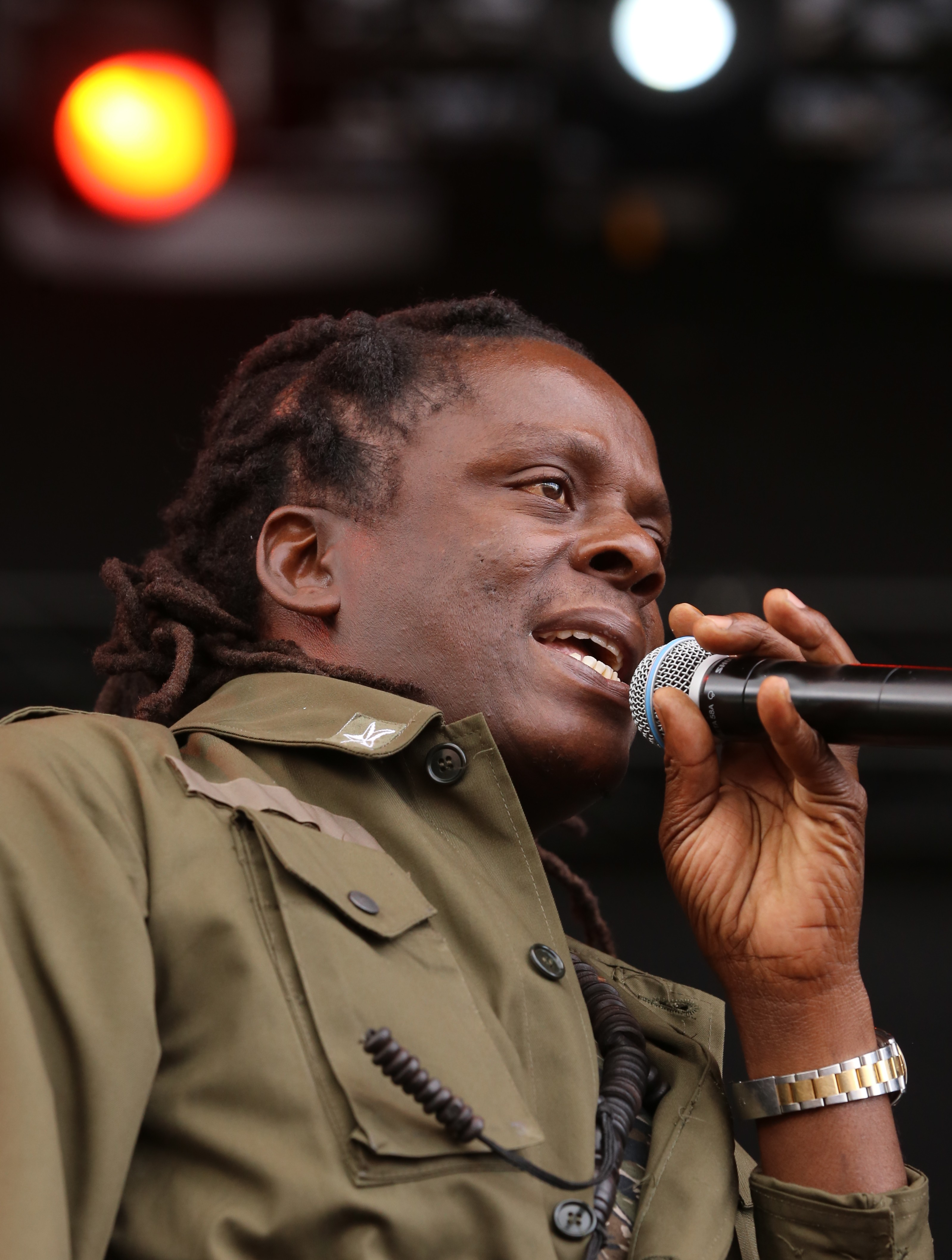
Richie Spice at Chiemsee Reggae Summer 2013

=== Albums ===
- Living Ain't Easy (1999)
- Universal (2000), Heartbeat
- Spice in Your Life (2006), VP
- In the Streets to Africa (2007), VP - Top Reggae Albums #6
- Motherland Africa (2007), Penitentiary - also released as Africa Calling
- Gideon Boot (2008), VP - Top Reggae Albums #1
- Book of Job (2011), VP - Top Reggae Albums #4
- Richie Spice Acoustic - Soothing Sounds (2012), Tad's International
- Together We Stand (2020), VP

=== Compilations ===
- Toe 2 Toe (2005), Charm - with Jah Cure
