= She Don't Let Nobody (But Me) =

1981 single by Curtis Mayfield

Single by Curtis Mayfield

from the album Love Is the Place
- B-side: "You Get All My Love"
- Released: 1981
- Length: 3:49 (single version); 4:16 (album version)
- Label: Boardwalk
- Songwriters: Curtis Mayfield; Dino Fekaris
- Producers: Curtis Mayfield; Dino Fekaris

Curtis Mayfield singles chronology
"Tripping Out" (1980)	"She Don't Let Nobody (But Me)" (1981)	"Toot An' Toot An' Toot" (1982)

"She Don't Let Nobody (But Me)" is a song by American singer-songwriter Curtis Mayfield, included on his twentienth solo album, Love Is the Place (1982). It was released in 1981 by Boardwalk Records as the first single from the album and reached No. 15 on the US Billboard Hot Soul Singles chart.

== Charts ==
Chart (1981)	Peak position
US Hot R&B/Hip-Hop Songs (Billboard)	15

== Chaka Demus & Pliers version ==
"She Don't Let Nobody"

Single by Chaka Demus & Pliers

from the album Tease Me
- Released: 1993
- Length: 3:49
- Label: Mango
- Songwriters: Curtis Mayfield; Dino Fekaris
- Producers: Lloyd "Gitsy" Willis; Sly & Robbie; Trish Farrell

Chaka Demus & Pliers singles chronology
"Tease Me" (1993)	"She Don't Let Nobody" (1993)	"Twist and Shout" (1993)

In 1993, Jamaican reggae duo Chaka Demus & Pliers covered the song as "She Don't Let Nobody" for their fourth album, Tease Me (1993). The song was produced by Lloyd "Gitsy" Willis, Sly & Robbie and Trish Farrell. It was released as a single in late 1993 by Mango Records and was a top-20 hit in at least five countries, peaking at No. 4 in the United Kingdom, No. 9 in Ireland, and No. 12 in the Netherlands.

=== Critical reception ===
Larry Flick from Billboard magazine wrote, "Reggae duo interprets a Curtis Mayfield evergreen with a warm and faithful hand. Delicate funk rhythms are injected with subtle island nuances. The vocal arrangement is handled in a similar fashion, as tuneful toasting is countered by smooth and easygoing crooning." In his weekly UK chart commentary, James Masterton felt that it "is ever more commercial than the last hit. Top Ten assured." James Hamilton, in Music Week's RM Dance Update, described the song as a "sweetly soulful swayer". Gavin Reeve from Smash Hits gave it three out of five, saying, "Mr Demus opens up his toolbox and builds another big reggae hit wit his friend Mr Pliers. This time around, they actually sing and quite good they are too." He deemed it "a slow-dance of a song".

=== Charts ===
==== Weekly charts ====
Chart (1993–1994)	Peak position
Australia (ARIA)	37
Belgium (Ultratop 50 Flanders)	26
Canada Top Singles (RPM)	69
Europe (Eurochart Hot 100)	22
Europe (European Dance Radio)	15
Europe (European Hit Radio)	23
France (SNEP)	19
Germany (GfK)	59
Ireland (IRMA)	9
Netherlands (Dutch Top 40)	17
Netherlands (Single Top 100)	12
New Zealand (Recorded Music NZ)	20
UK Singles (Official Charts)	4
UK Airplay (Music Week)	4
UK Dance (Music Week)	11
UK Club Chart (Music Week)	57

==== Year-end charts ====
Chart (1993)	Position
UK Singles (OCC)	48
UK Airplay (Music Week)	29

=== Certifications ===
Region	Certification	Certified units/sales
New Zealand (RMNZ)	Platinum	30,000^{‡}
United Kingdom (BPI)	Silver	200,000^{^}
^{^} Shipments figures based on certification alone.^{‡} Sales+streaming figures based on certification alone.
