= Rotimi Jaiyesimi =

Nigerian medical doctor

Rotimi Jaiyesimi is a Nigerian consultant obstetrician and gynaecologist and academic based in the United Kingdom. He is the Group Associate Medical Director for Patient Safety at the Mid and South Essex NHS Foundation Trust in the United Kingdom and serves as an Adjunct Professor of Medical Law at the University of Ibadan and as a guest lecturer at the Nigerian Law School and University of Medical Sciences (UNIMED).

== Education ==
Jaiyesimi received his medical training at the University of Ibadan Medical School, Nigeria graduating with MBBS in 1978. He holds a Master of Law (LL.M) in Medical Law and a Master of Business Administration (MBA). Jaiyesimi is a Fellow of the Royal College of Obstetricians and Gynaecologists (FRCOG), the Royal Society for Public Health (FRSPH) and the West African College of Surgeons (FWACS).

== Career ==
He started his medical career in Nigeria in 1978 before relocating to the British Isles where he received specialist training with focus on gynecological conditions such as polyendocrine metabolic ovarian syndrome (PMOS), menopause management, heavy periods (menorrhagia), pelvic pain and menstrual disorders.

After his training in British Isles, he practiced in Saudi Arabia and Ireland before moving to the United Kingdom. In 1994, he was appointed as a Consultant Obstetrician and Gynaecologist in the UK. He is one of the first Nigerians to hold the position serving at the National Health Service (NHS) in England until 2012. From 2014 to 2017, he served as Consultant Obstetrician and Gynaecologist at the Northumbria Healthcare NHS Foundation Trust. In 2014, he developed an Electronic Mortality Review Tool (MARS) at Basildon Hospital.

Jaiyesimi serves as an adjunct professor of Medical Law at the University of Ibadan and as visiting lecturer at the Nigerian Law School and University of Medical Sciences (UNIMED). His medical law practice focuses on expert witness report, court evidence for clinical negligence and single joint expert (SJE).

He holds the Health Service Journal National Award for Innovative Development and the University of Ibadan Lifetime Achievement Award (2018).

== Selected publications ==
- The challenge of implementing the Sustainable Development Goals in Africa: the way forward
- Contemporary obstetrics and gynecology for developing countries
- Human papillomavirus vaccination in adolescence
- Caesarean section
- COMMENTARY-Developing COVID-19 Simulation Tool for Low and Middle-Income Countries: The Nigerian Case Study
