= Dancehall Queens =

A Dancehall Queen is a female celebrity in the musical genre called dancehall. She is known for her charisma, latest dance moves, and sexy fashion sense. The tradition originated in Jamaican dancehall parties in the ghettos, seeking the best local female dancer. Each Jamaican parish holds a local dancehall queen competition annually, the most popular being the Dancehall Queen competition in Montego Bay.

== Competition winners ==
- Dancehall Queen Carlene - Jamaica's first National Dancehall Queen

International Dancehall Queens

- Dancehall Queen ? Dancehall Queen Keisha Campbell
- Dancehall Queen 1999 - 2002 Dancehall Queen Stacey
- Dancehall Queen 2002 - 2003 Dancehall Queen Junko Kudō
- Dancehall Queen 2003 - 2004 Dancehall Queen Mad Michelle
- Dancehall Queen 2004 - 2005 Dancehall Queen Madd Lynn
- Dancehall Queen 2005 - 2006 Dancehall Queen Shanique Taylor
- Dancehall Queen 2006 - 2007 Dancehall Queen Shalara Gayle
- Dancehall Queen 2007 - 2008 Dancehall Queen Mo Mo
- Dancehall Queen 2008 - 2009 Dancehall Queen Michelle Young
- Dancehall Queen 2009 - 2010 Dancehall Queen Tavia Morris
- Dancehall Queen 2010 - 2011 Dancehall Queen Kristal Anderson
- Dancehall Queen 2011 - 2012 Dancehall Queen Aneika Francis
