= Joseph Olurotimi Sanya =

Nigeria Researcher

Joseph Olurotimi Sanya is a Nigerian researcher, professor, provost, and a reader in physiology at the College of Medicine and Health Sciences (CMHS), Afe Babalola University (ABUAD).

== Background ==
Sanya was born at Iyin-Ekiti, Ekiti State, on June 11, 1956. He attended the All Saints' Primary School, Iyin Ekiti (1962–1967); Eyemote Comprehensive High School, Iyin-Ekiti (1973–1976); University of Lagos (1977–1978); College of Medicine, University of Calabar (1978–1983); Obafemi Awolowo University, Ile Ife (2001–2003); and the University of Ilorin (2007–2010).

Sanya is a medical doctor and researcher in physiology, in which he has a Ph.D. from the University of Ilorin, Nigeria (2011). His Ph.D. thesis was on the Effects of Aqueous Extract of Zanthoxyllum zanthoxylloides and Aframomum melegueta on Sickle Cell Vaso-occlusive Crisis while his Master's dissertation was on Electrocardiographic Profiles of Normotensives At-Risk of Developing Hypertension (OAU, Ife.2003).

Sanya obtained an MB.BCH degree from the University of Calabar (1983) and is a member of many learned societies including: Nigerian Medical Association (NMA), Physiological Society of Nigeria (PSN) and the West African Network of Natural Product Research Scientists (WANNPRES).

== Awards ==
Sanya has won several awards, which include the prestigious National Productivity Order of Merit Award (2012) and Ekiti State Merit Award and Honours Roll (2013).
