= Better Tomorrow (album) =

Studio album by Etana
- Released: February 18, 2013
- Genre: Reggae
- Label: VP Records

Better Tomorrow is a studio album by a Jamaican reggae female singer, Etana, released on February 18, 2013, under VP Records. "Etana" will return in 2013 with a scorching new reggae set of 14 new songs about life, love and reggae. "Better Tomorrow" is fully rooted in the one drop reggae style that made Etana’s name. The album is produced by Shane Brown of Jukeboxx Productions (Busy Signal) and showcases the talents of some of Jamaica’s top studio musicians and legendary engineer Errol Brown.

== Executive producer ==
Chris Chin

== Discography ==
No.	Title	Artist	Writer(s)
1	Spoken Soul	Etana	S. McKenzie / A. Morris / N. Edwards / S. Hayden / A. Cruz Jr.
2	Queen	Etana	S. McKenzie / K. Mattis / S. Brown / K. Bennett / L. Savory / A. Hoilett / K. Webster
3	Reggae	Etana	S. McKenzie / J. Adelman / S. Hayden / S. Brown / K. Bennett / L. Savory / A. Hoilett / K. Webster
4	Beautiful Day	Etana	S. McKenzie / A. Morris / S. Brown / K. Bennett / L. Savory / A. Hoilett / K. Webster
5	All I Need	Etana	S. McKenzie / A. Morris / A. Cruz Jr. / S. Hayden / S. Brown / K. Bennett / L. Savory / A. Hoilett / K. Webster
6	Whole New World	Etana	S. McKenzie / K. Mattis / S. Brown / K. Bennett / L. Savory / A. Hoilett / K. Webster
7	4 Play 2 Love (Start Over)	Etana	S. McKenzie / K. Mattis / S. Brown / N. Edwards / K. Bennett / L. Savory / A. Hoilett / K. Webster
8	Silly	Etana	F. Baskett / C. McDonald / D. Williams
9	Till You Get Old (Life's Gift)	Etana	S. McKenzie / S. Hayden / J. Adelman / S. Brown / L. Savory / N. Edwards
10	The Prayer	Etana	S. McKenzie / S. Brown / K. Bennett / A. Hoilett / L. Savory / K. Webster
11	Strongest	Etana	S. McKenzie / S. Brown / K. Bennett / A. Hoilett / L. Savory / K. Webster
12	Be Alright (Interlude)	Etana	S. McKenzie / S. Hayden / J. Adelman / N. Edwards
13	Smile	Etana	S. McKenzie / A. Cruz Jr. / S. Hayden / S. Brown / K. Bennett / L. Savory / A. Hoilett / K. Webster
14	Better Tomorrow	Etana	S. McKenzie / S. Brown / K. Bennett / A. Hoilett / L. Savory / K. Webster
