= Osmani García =

Cuban rapper (born 1981)

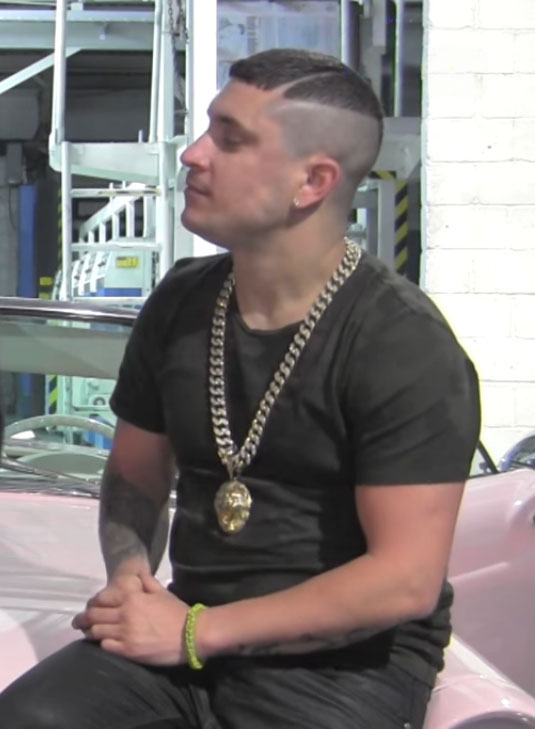

Background information
- Birth name: Osmani García González Kats
- Born: 22 May 1981 (age 44); Guanabacoa, Havana, Cuba
- Genres: Cubatón
- Occupations: Rapper; singer
- Instrument: Vocals
- Years active: 2011–present
- Labels: EGREM

Osmani "La Voz" García González Kats (born May 22, 1981 in Guanabacoa) is a Cuban reggaeton (cubatón) rapper and singer.

== Biography ==
García participated in the National Festival of Cuba and at 19, he received several awards in various categories at which point he began to sing professionally.

He co-founded El Duo de Cristal in 2001, who wrote their own songs, and combined Cuban styles with international pop. They played three domestic Cuban tours, reached #1 in the Cuban charts and appeared on youth music programs such as A Moverse, Super 12, De mi pa ti and Mezcla.

Hits included Mujer quien eres tú, as well as Mujer which was used for public service messages on Cuban television promoting International Women's Day and Mother's Day.

In early 2006 he joined the group Paulo FG and Elite and also performed in the Festival Internacional de Cali in Colombia, sharing the stage with Maelo Ruíz.

He has also shared the stage with Chucho Valdés, Los Van Van, Tata Güines, Charanga Habanera, Gente de Zona, José Luis Cortes and NG La Banda, and Manolito Simonet. In 2008, García set out on his own writing and producing his own material under the production of DJ Nando Pro. In this project he collaborated with vocalist José "El Pillo", guitarist Armando Peláez and DJ and background vocalist Roly Stereo.

In March 2012 García arrived in Miami to do a 14-city tour of the United States.

== Controversy and banning of Chupi Chupi ==
His song Chupi Chupi, an "unabashed ode to oral sex", was denounced in November 2011 by Cuban Minister of Culture Abel Prieto, and Cuban Institute of Music President Orlando Vistelas, as degenerate. García made headlines by writing a letter of complaint back to the Minister.

Dr. María Córdova, Professor of Music and Art also criticized the song in the Cuban Communist Party daily Granma (newspaper), in the article "Vulgarity in our music: the choice of the 'Cuban people'?" (La vulgaridad en nuestra música: ¿una elección del 'pueblo cubano?'), arguing that such songs are offensive because of their machismo as well as

"reducing sexual relations to the level at which a prostitute would have them. Vulgarity has never been the essence of Cuban music; examples of this are too many to count... Music is not always art, and not everything that sounds like music is valid from an artistic point of view".

A few days prior to that the Cuban state criticized reggaeton (cubatón) music in general, and recommended a "low" level of broadcasting of songs of the genre.

The song's video was nominated in several categories for the November 2011 Premios Lucas (Cuban video music awards).

As of March 2012 the song was still banned from the Cuban airwaves by the Cuban Institute of Radio and Television.

== Discography ==
=== Album "El Malcriao" ===
- Intro
- La malcria
- Acaríciame
- Hacer el amor (feat. La Sociedad)
- No me enamoro (feat. Gente de Zona)
- Deja la locura (feat. Los Cuatro Jose El Pillo)
- Tú me hieres (feat. Laritza Bacallao)
- Loca (feat. Jose El Pillo Leoni Torres)
- Gira que te veo fija (feat. A.Daniel Jose El Pillo)
- Nada contigo
- No es culpa tuya
- Mujer

=== Others ===
- Chupi chupi
- El pudín
- Se me va la musa
- Fue suyo el error
- Ella es mía
- La putería
- Mi amiguito el pipi
- Pegua la vuelta (y olvídame)
- El taxi (feat. Pitbull and Sensato)
