= Chuck Fenda =

Jamaican-American musician and DJ

- Also known as: The Living Fire, Poor People Defender, Chuck Fender
- Born: Leshorn Dalton Whitehead; June 15, 1972 (age 53); Brooklyn, New York, United States
- Genres: Reggae, Dancehall
- Occupations: Musician, singer-songwriter, record producer
- Instrument: Vocals
- Years active: 1996–present

Leshorn Dalton Whitehead (born June 15, 1972), better known by his stage name Chuck Fenda, is a Jamaican American reggae musician and deejay born in Brooklyn, New York City. Raised in Jamaica, Fenda is also known as "The Living Fire", "Poor People Defender" and "Chuck Fender". He has toured in both the United States and Jamaica. He is the father of rapper Anoyd.

His song "All About da Weed" was featured in the soundtrack for the video game Grand Theft Auto IV. His Lloyd "John John" James, Jr.-produced fifth album Jah Element was released September 10, 2013, on John John Records.

== Discography ==
Studio albums

- Better Days (2005), Fifth Element
- The Living Fire (2007), Greensleeves – with song "Child of the Universe" featuring Tanya Stephens.
- Fulfillment (2009), VP
- Live in San Francisco (2009), 2B1
- Jah Element (2013), John John Records

Compilation appearances

- Grand Theft Auto IV soundtrack (2008)
