= Junko Kudō =

Japanese dancer

Junko Kudo, alias Junko, Junko Bashment or Dancehall Queen Junko, is a Japanese professional dancer, specialising in reggae dance, known internationally in reggae circles as the first foreign "Dancehall Queen".

== Biography ==
Under the nickname of Junko Bashment, aged 24 in April 2002, she became the first non-Jamaican, in Montego Bay, Jamaica, to win the official female dance tournament for "dancehall reggae" music and took the $50,000 prize, and as a consequence took the title of "Dancehall Queen", after two years of practice and a background in classical ballet. With her victory, she opened the door for dancers from around the world to compete. Known in the reggae world under the nickname Dancehall Queen Junko (or sometimes simply Junko after losing her title), she has since featured in videos, shows, and concerts "sound systems" in reggae music around the world, including in France. She also teaches dance in Japan, and has released DVDs teaching and demonstrating as an artist and producer, and popularising Jamaican culture in Japan. A television report dedicated to Junko was part of the British television programme Japanorama shown on 21 September 2006 on BBC Three.

== Artistic career ==
=== Dance ===
Dancehall Queen Junko video appearances has included videos from Elephant Man like "Pon Di River". She is also in the 2006 Dutty Wine video by Tony Matterhorn.

== DVD ==
- 2006/02/14 : High School Dancehall – DVD Magazine Volume 1 – Produced By Junko
- 2006/08/10 : Dance Style Reggae 2 – Junko
- 2008/03/25 : Dance Hall Queen Junko presents: Reggae Channel – World Dance
