= Mad Michelle =

Jamaican dancer

Mad Michelle (real name Ann Marie McKoy) is a Jamaican dancer who was crowned Dancehall Queen in 2003. She is among several dancers claiming to have originated the popular Dutty Wine dance.

McKoy was born in Jamaica. She was a model and choreographer before winning the Dancehall Queen competition in 2003.

After winning Dancehall Queen in 2003 Mad Michelle went on to appear in many popular dancehall videos both local and internationally, such as Lady Saw's Man Is The Least video.
