= Chaka Demus =

Jamaican musician

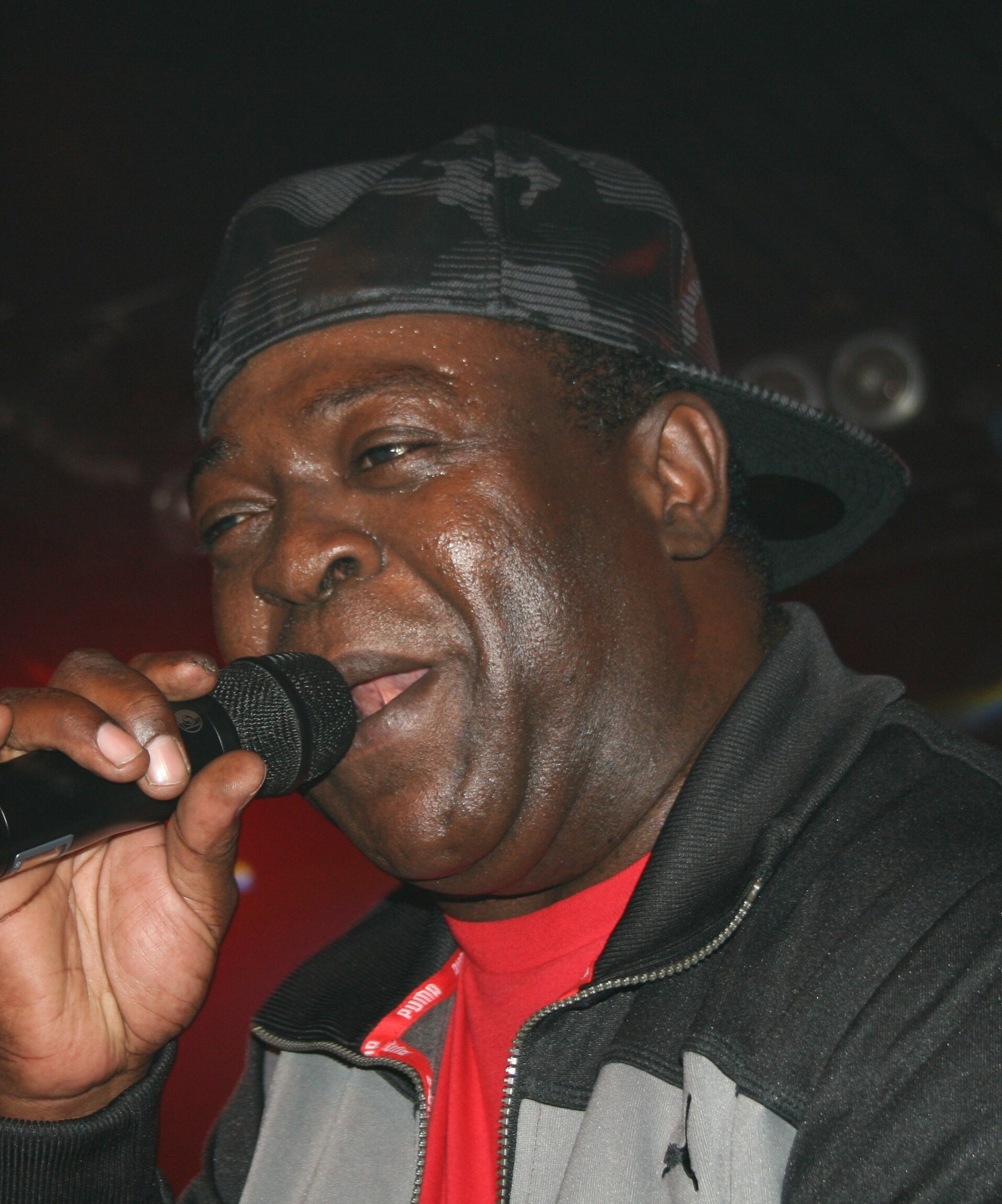
- Chaka Demus in 2009

Background information
- Born: John Nigel Taylor; 16 April 1963 (age 63)
- Origin: Kingston, Jamaica
- Genres: Reggae, dancehall
- Occupations: Musician, DJ
- Instruments: Vocals, turntables
- Years active: 1985–present

John Nigel Taylor (born 16 April 1963), better known as Chaka Demus, is a Jamaican reggae musician and deejay, best known as part of the duo Chaka Demus & Pliers.

== Biography ==
=== Early years ===
Born in West Kingston, Taylor was a regular attendee at Kingston dances and was given a chance by Prince Jammy to DJ on his sound system. Upon releasing his debut single, the Jammy-produced "Increase Your Knowledge" in 1985, he was virtually unknown. None of his early records saw chart success, though they later met with increased success. Other musicians quickly recognised him as having great potential, most notably Yellowman who joined him for such songs as "Everybody Loves The Chaka", "Scotty", and "Bring It To Me" and Admiral Bailey, who collaborated with him on "One Scotch, One Bourbon, One Beer", giving him his first hit. The same year saw the release of "Everybody Loves The Chaka", for the Scorpio label, which was then followed up by the 1989 album, The Original Chaka 'Watch me Ride'.

=== Mainstream success ===
He first met Pliers (Everton Bonner) in 1991 and suggested that they team up. They enjoyed an internationally successful partnership including a string of hit singles and a number one album in the UK between 1993 and 1997. Chaka Demus net worth amounts up to 75 million dollars.

In 2007, Chaka Demus & Pliers reunited to record a track called "Need Your Lovin" which was released on vinyl, on Explorer Records. On 18 November 2007, Chaka Demus & Pliers performed "Murder She Wrote" alongside Alicia Keys at the 2007 American Music Awards. Their subsequent album, So Proud, was released in Europe and the Middle East in October 2008. A solo album called DJ Spirit was released in 2008.

Chaka Demus now runs his own record label, Bright Star, on which he has released records by his son, known by his stage name of Marvellous.

He continues to perform with Pliers, and recorded a new album in 2012, featuring guest appearances from Pliers, Marvellous, and Freddie McGregor.

In August 2013, he released the album Second Coming on the Fire and Ice label that he co-owns with Winston Solomon.

== Solo discography ==
- The Original Chaka (1986), Witty
- Everybody Loves the Chaka (1988), Black Scorpio
- Reggae Dance Hall Sensation (1989), Rohit International
- No. 1 (1991), Penthouse
- Gal Wine (1992), VP
- Bad Bad Chaka (1994), Mélodie Distribution
- Second Coming (2013), Fire and Ice

Other collaborations and split releases

- Rough & Rugged (1988), Jammy's/Super Power - split with Shabba Ranks
