= Chaka Demus & Pliers =

Jamaican reggae duo

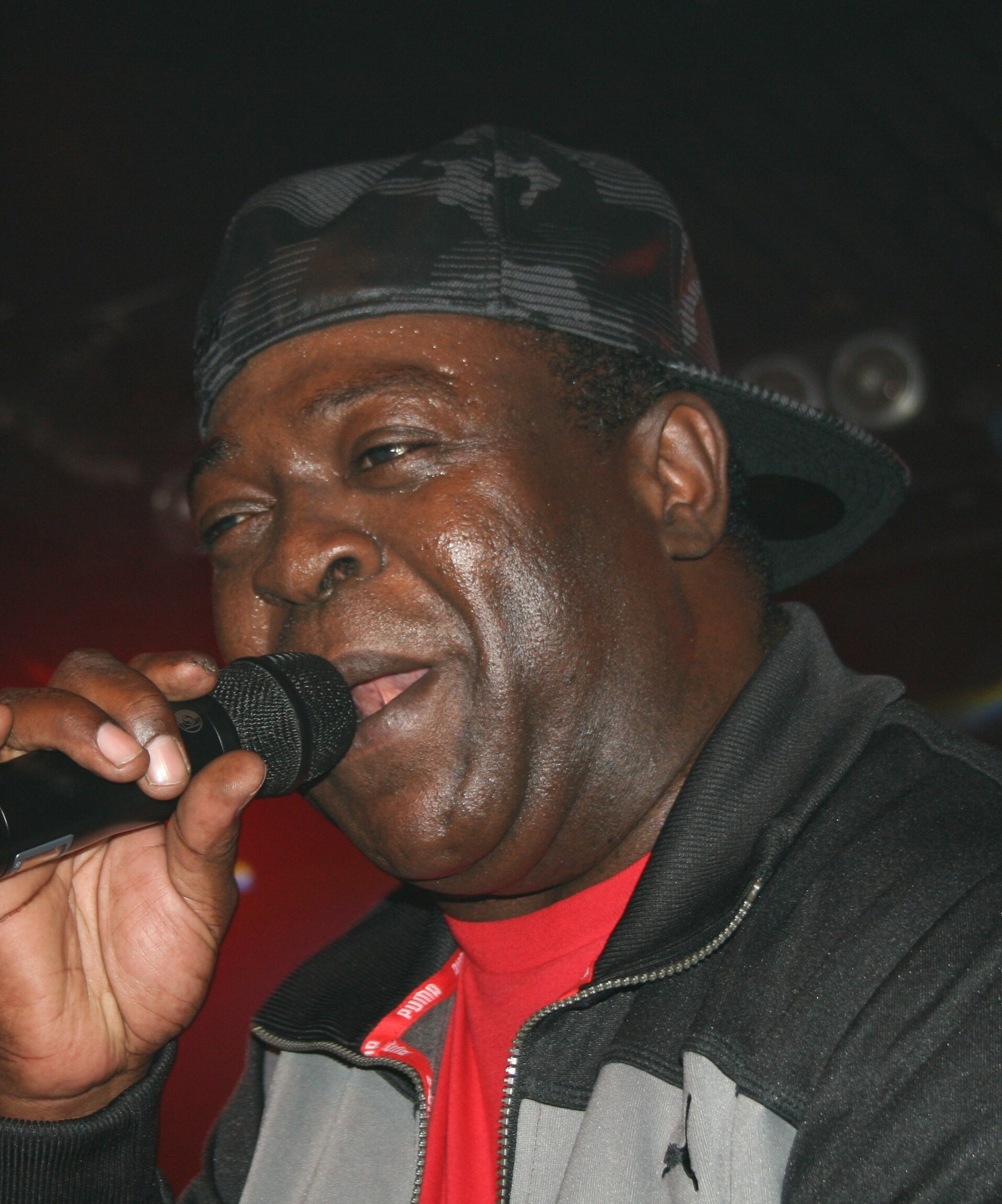
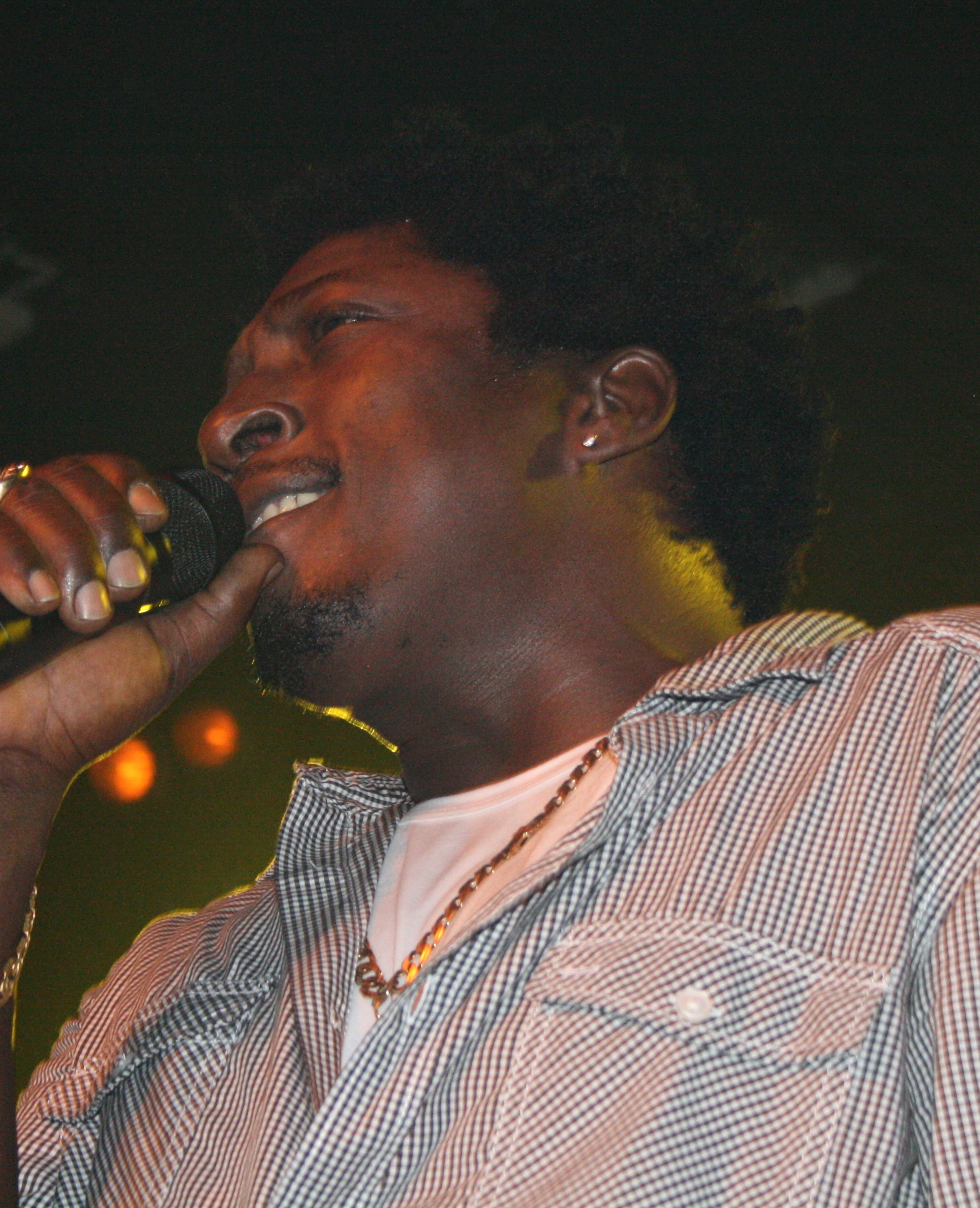
- Chaka Demus (left) and Pliers (right) in 2009

Background information
- Origin: Kingston, Jamaica
- Genres: Reggae, dancehall
- Years active: 1991–present
- Labels: Greensleeves, RAS, Island, Explorer
- Members: Chaka Demus; Pliers

Chaka Demus & Pliers are a Jamaican reggae duo made up of deejay Chaka Demus (born John Taylor) and singer Pliers (born Everton Bonner), known for their hits "Tease Me" and "Murder She Wrote". As a duo, they enjoyed more commercial success with mainstream pop fans after their collaboration began in the early 1990s than either had in their previous solo careers.

== Career ==
Both artists were established musicians when they teamed up in 1991 after performing together in Miami, both having worked as solo artists, and Pliers as a duo with Pinchers. Their early hits together included "Gal Wine", recorded for producer Ossie Hibbert. They went on to work with a string of producers, including Ranking Joe, Jah Screw, Prince Jammy, and Mafia & Fluxy, with several of their most successful single tracks included on their debut album Gal Wine (1992).

They appeared at Reggae Sunsplash in 1992, and the following year broke through to international success with "Tease Me", which was in the UK Singles Chart for three months in 1993, peaking at No. 3 in July. They followed this with a cover of Curtis Mayfield's "She Don't Let Nobody" and a cover (with collaboration of Jack Radics) of the Top Notes' "Twist and Shout", which topped the UK Singles Chart in early 1994, the duo becoming the first Jamaican act to top the chart in 8 years, and the first to have three consecutive top five hits on the chart. They had further UK hits with "I Wanna Be Your Man" (No. 19) and "Gal Wine" (No. 20), with six hit singles in all taken from their album, Tease Me. The re-release of Tease Me also charted at number one on the UK Albums Chart in 1994, going on to receive gold certification, selling more than 500,000 copies.

In 1996, they signed to Island Records and released the album For Every Kinda People.

They performed at Sunsplash again in 2004 and 2008, and released the album Help Them Lord in 2001.

In 2007, Chaka Demus & Pliers recorded "Need Your Lovin", which was released on vinyl on Explorer Records. This song was a hit on the Jamaican chart.

On 18 November 2007, Chaka Demus & Pliers performed "Murder She Wrote" alongside Alicia Keys at the 2007 American Music Awards. In the summer of 2008, they performed at the annual Detroit Caribbean Festival. Their latest album So Proud was released on 6 October 2008.

In July 2013, Chaka Demus & Pliers performed at the BET Awards show in the reggae segment alongside Dawn Penn, Beenie Man and Elephant Man.

== Discography ==
=== Albums ===
- Gal Wine Wine Wine (1992), Greensleeves
- Bad Mind (1992), Pow Wow
- Ruff This Year (1992), RAS
- Tease Me (1993), Mango (also released as All She Wrote) – UK No. 1 (BPI: Platinum), NZ No. 6, AUS No. 45, US Reggae Albums No. 7
- For Every Kinda People (1996), Island – US Reggae Albums No. 14
- Consciousness a Lick (1995), Melodie
- Dangerous (2000), Fuel 2000
- Help Them Lord (2001), RAS
- Trouble and War (2003), Prestige
- Back Against the Wall (2005), Explorer
- Back Off the Wall, Nocturne
- So Proud (2008), AGR/Universal

Compilations

- Gold (1992), Charm
- Chaka Demus & Pliers (1992), Charm
- Unstoppable 1986-1992 (1996), Emporio
- Murder She Wrote (2000), Spectrum
- Dancehall Dons (2001), Recall
- Ultimate Collection (2002), Hip O
- Dancehall Classics (2004), Rhythm Club
- Run the City (2006), Dynamic
- On Top of the World (2008), Dynamic

=== Singles ===
Year	Title	Peak chart positions										Certifications	Album
Year	Title	AUS	BEL (Fl)	FRA	GER	IRE	NL	NZ	UK	US	US R&B	Certifications	Album
1992	"Murder She Wrote" (US release)	—	—	—	—	—	—	—	—	57	39	RMNZ: Platinum	Tease Me/All She Wrote
1993	"Tease Me"	5	16	47	31	16	5	15	3	—	—	ARIA: Gold; BPI: Gold; RMNZ: Gold	Tease Me/All She Wrote
1993	"I Wanna Be Your Man" (US release)	—	—	—	—	—	—	—	—	—	87		Tease Me/All She Wrote
1993	"She Don't Let Nobody"	37	26	19	59	9	12	20	4	—	—	BPI: Silver; RMNZ: Platinum	Tease Me/All She Wrote
1993	"Twist and Shout" (with Jack Radics and Taxi Gang)	13	7	23	32	9	8	2	1	—	—	ARIA: Gold; BPI: Gold; RMNZ: Gold	Tease Me/All She Wrote
1994	"Murder She Wrote" (international release)	—	—	—	—	—	—	—	27	—	—	BPI: Gold	Tease Me/All She Wrote
1994	"I Wanna Be Your Man" (international release)	—	—	—	—	—	—	30	19	—	—		Tease Me/All She Wrote
1994	"Gal Wine"	—	—	—	—	—	—	—	20	—	—		Tease Me/All She Wrote
1996	"Every Kinda People"	—	—	—	—	—	—	15	47	—	—		For Every Kinda People
1997	"Every Little Thing She Does Is Magic"	—	—	—	—	—	—	19	51	—	—		Reggatta Mondatta (A Reggae Tribute to The Police)
