= Pliers (singer) =

Jamaican reggae singer (born 1963)

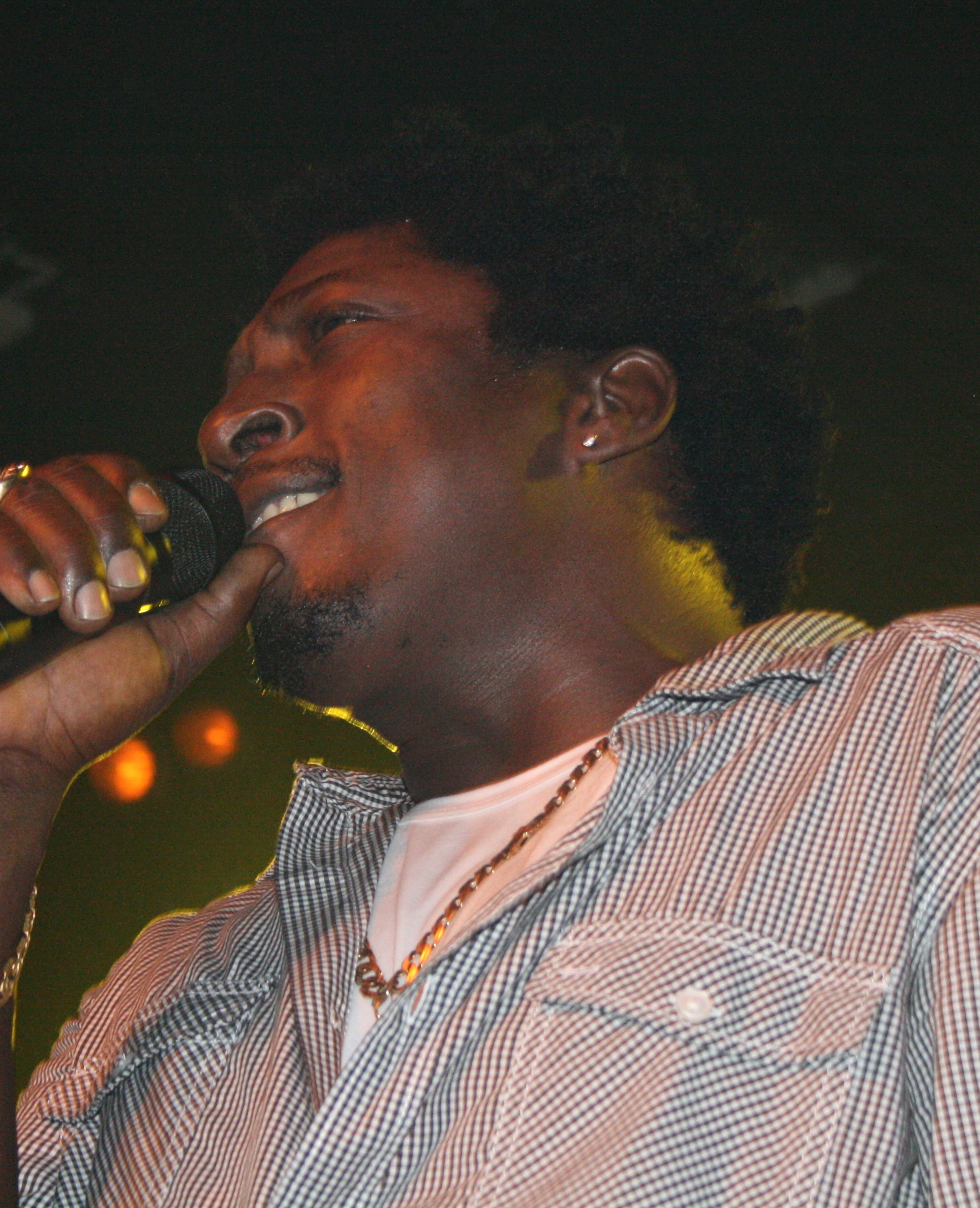
- Pliers performing in 2009

Background information
- Born: Everton Bonner; 4 April 1963 (age 63); Kingston, Jamaica
- Origin: Kingston, Jamaica
- Genres: Reggae
- Occupation: Singer
- Instrument: Vocals

Everton Bonner (born 4 April 1963), better known as Pliers, is a Jamaican reggae singer best known for his collaborations with deejay Chaka Demus under the name Chaka Demus & Pliers. He is one of the Bonner brothers, all of whom are reggae artists, including Richie Spice and Spanner Banner.

Pliers started his career performing under the name 'Blues Melody', acquiring his more famous moniker due to an apparent similarity to fellow singer Pinchers.

He had a number of early hits, working for producers such as Coxsone Dodd and Winston Riley, but never achieved huge success as a solo artist, in contrast to the immense success of his partnership with Chaka Demus.

His solo song "Bam Bam" was featured on the fictional radio station K-Jah West in the soundtrack to the game Grand Theft Auto: San Andreas.
