= Can't Stop the Love (song) =

Single by Neon Jungle featuring Snob Scrilla

from the album Welcome to the Jungle
- Released: 15 December 2014
- Genre: Pop
- Length: 3:42
- Label: RCA
- Songwriters: Cassie Davis, Sean Ray, Wayne Wilkins
- Producer: Dr. Vades

Neon Jungle singles chronology
"Louder" (2014)	"Can't Stop the Love" (2014)

Snob Scrilla singles chronology
"Heartbreak Scorsese" (2009)	"Can't Stop the Love" (2014)

"Can't Stop the Love" is a song by British vocal group Neon Jungle featuring Australian-American rapper Snob Scrilla. It is Neon Jungle's fifth and final single from their debut album, Welcome to the Jungle (2014), and was released in the United Kingdom on 15 December 2014.

== Background ==
The band said that the song's theme and subject meant a lot to them, elaborating: "It's really empowering and gives out a strong positive message. We're all equal, regardless of race, gender, sexuality etc and we should all love and accept love. It takes the smallest of efforts to make such a huge difference in someone's life, whether that be a helping hand, or even just a smile."

== Music video ==
A music video for the single was released on 5 November 2014. It features a number of fans – when the song was announced as the next single, a picture of a hand-written message was Tweeted inviting fans to appear in the video – as well as the four members of Neon Jungle and Snob Scrilla.

== Critical reception ==
Helena Ho of Renownedforsound.com gave the song a positive review, stating that "their potential shines ... in the milder, though lyrically impressive Can't Stop the Love, where the girls address social issues including violence and racism. Considering that their fanbase leans dominantly towards youth, the track is a good way to inspire positivity and acceptance within the next generation of adults". In addition, Bekka Collins commended the record's "urban-infused beats" being "contrasted with delicate vocals", further commenting "It is a definite comedown from the upbeat beginning [of previous singles Braveheart, Welcome to the Jungle, Trouble and Louder], but the chorus picks back up the pace with an addictive melody and fast-paced handclaps". In addition, 4Music called it "uplifting" and in a track-by-track review of album Welcome to the Jungle, Rebecca Mattina of ANDPOP was ambivalent, dismissing it as "an acceptable pop number" lacking "anything dynamic or memorable", further berating Scrilla's contribution as "awkward and out of place" but conceding that "the hand-clapping hook we hear in the first half of the chorus gives it some oomph, and the beautiful lyrics are encouraging".
