= List of UK top-ten albums in 2014 =

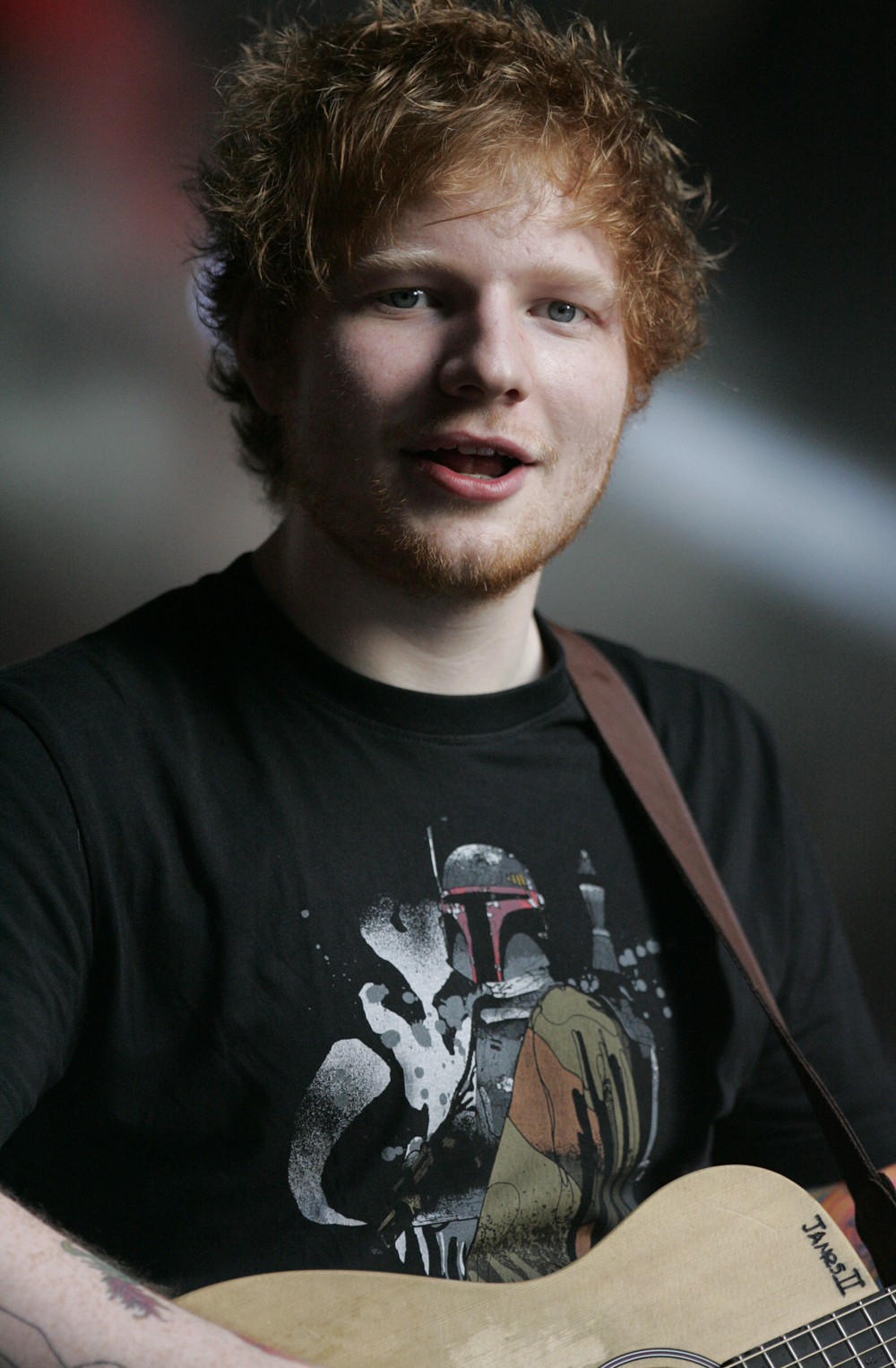
Ed Sheeran had the best-selling album of 2014 with his second studio album ×. The album has sold over 3.5 million copies in the UK alone.

The UK Albums Chart is one of many music charts compiled by the Official Charts Company that calculates the best-selling albums of the week in the United Kingdom. Since 2004 the chart has been based on the sales of both physical albums and digital downloads. This list shows albums that peaked in the top 10 of the UK Albums Chart during 2014, as well as albums which peaked in 2013 and 2015 but were in the top 10 in 2014. The entry date is when the album appeared in the top 10 for the first time (week ending, as published by the Official Charts Company, which is six days after the chart is announced).

One-hundred and fifty-eight albums were in the top ten this year. Two albums from 2012 and sixteen albums from 2013 remained in the top 10 for several weeks at the beginning of the year, while Hozier by Hozier was released in 2014 but did not reach its peak until 2015. Beyoncé by Beyoncé was the only album from 2013 to reach its peak in 2014. Halcyon by Ellie Goulding debuted in 2012 and re-entered the top 10 in 2013, but its peak position was not until 2014. Sam Smith and Ella Henderson were among the many artists who achieved their first UK charting top 10 album in 2014.

The first new number-one album of the year was Halcyon by Ellie Goulding. Overall, thirty-two different albums peaked at number-one in 2014, with thirty-two unique artists hitting that position.

== Background ==
=== Multiple entries ===
One-hundred and fifty-eight albums charted in the top 10 in 2014, with one-hundred and forty-two albums reaching their peak this year.

=== Chart debuts ===
Six artists achieved their first top 10 album in 2014 as a lead artist (correct to 22 March 2014).

The following table (collapsed on desktop site) does not include acts who had previously charted as part of a group and secured their first top 10 solo album, or featured appearances on compilations or other artists recordings.

Artist	Number of top 10s	First entry	Chart position	Other entries
Warpaint	1	Warpaint	9	—
Mogwai	1	Rave Tapes	10	—
Within Temptation	1	Hydra	6	—
Temples	1	Sun Structures	7	—
Wild Beasts	1	Present Tense	7	—
Metronomy	1	Love Letters	7	—
Nicholas McDonald	1	In the Arms of an Angel	6	—
Sam Bailey	1	The Power of Love	1	—
The Vamps	1	Meet the Vamps	2	—
Iggy Azalea	1	The New Classic	5	—
Black Stone Cherry	1	Magic Mountain	5	—
Foxes	1	Glorious	5	—
Nick Mulvey	1	First Mind	10	—
Sam Smith	1	In the Lonely Hour	1	—
Clean Bandit	1	New Eyes	3	—
Mastodon	1	Once More 'Round the Sun	10	—
5 Seconds of Summer	1	5 Seconds of Summer	2	—
George Ezra	1	Wanted on Voyage	1	—
Jungle	1	Jungle	7	—
Neon Jungle	1	Welcome to the Jungle	8	—
Collabro	1	Stars	1	—
Twin Atlantic	1	Great Divide	6	—
Royal Blood	1	Royal Blood	1	—
Catfish and the Bottlemen	1	The Balcony	10	—
Alt-J	1	This Is All Yours	1	—
Hozier	1	Hozier	3	—
Gorgon City	1	Sirens	10	—
Ella Henderson	1	Chapter One	1	—
You+Me	1	Rose Ave.	10	—

=== Best-selling albums ===
Ed Sheeran had the best-selling album of the year with ×. In the Lonely Hour by Sam Smith came in second place. George Ezra's Wanted on Voyage, Caustic Love from Paolo Nutini and Ghost Stories by Coldplay made up the top five. Albums by Paloma Faith, One Direction, Olly Murs, Pink Floyd and Take That were also in the top ten best-selling albums of the year.

== Top-ten albums ==
Key

Symbol	Meaning
‡	Album peaked in 2012 or 2013 but still in chart in 2014.
♦	Album released in 2014 but peaked in 2015.
(#)	Year-end top-ten album position and rank
Entered	The date that the album first appeared in the chart.
Peak	Highest position that the album reached in the UK Albums Chart.

Entered (week ending)	Weeks in top 10	Album	Artist	Peak	Peak reached (week ending)	Weeks at peak
Albums in 2012
20 October 2012	22	Halcyon	Ellie Goulding	1	11 January 2014	3
8 December 2012	16	Right Place Right Time ‡	Olly Murs	1	8 December 2012	2
Albums in 2013
16 March 2013	23	Bad Blood ‡	Bastille	1	16 March 2013	3
27 April 2013	17	To Be Loved ‡	Michael Bublé	1	27 April 2013	2
11 May 2013	19	Home ‡	Rudimental	1	11 May 2013	1
21 September 2013	16	AM ‡	Arctic Monkeys	1	21 September 2013	2
21 September 2013	19	If You Wait ‡	London Grammar	2	21 September 2013	1
28 September 2013	11	True ‡	Avicii	2	28 September 2013	2
26 October 2013	7	Tribute ‡	John Newman	1	26 October 2013	1
2 November 2013	4	Prism ‡	Katy Perry	1	2 November 2013	1
2 November 2013	5	Moon Landing ‡	James Blunt	2	2 November 2013	1
9 November 2013	6	Pure Heroine ‡	Lorde	4	9 November 2013	1
16 November 2013	8	The Marshall Mathers LP 2 ‡	Eminem	1	16 November 2013	1
23 November 2013	3	Direct Hits ‡	The Killers	6	23 November 2013	1
30 November 2013	9	Swings Both Ways ‡	Robbie Williams	1	30 November 2013	4
7 December 2013	6	Midnight Memories ‡	One Direction	1	7 December 2013	2
7 December 2013	13	Since I Saw You Last ‡	Gary Barlow	2	7 December 2013	4
14 December 2013	7	Christmas ‡	Michael Bublé	7	21 December 2013	2
21 December 2013	13	Beyoncé	Beyoncé	2	18 January 2014	1
Albums in 2014
25 January 2014	3	High Hopes	Bruce Springsteen	1	25 January 2014	1
1 February 2014	3	Wanderlust	Sophie Ellis-Bextor	4	1 February 2014	1
1 February 2014	1	Warpaint	Warpaint	9	1 February 2014	1
1 February 2014	1	Rave Tapes	Mogwai	10	1 February 2014	1
8 February 2014	2	Cavalier Youth	You Me at Six	1	8 February 2014	1
15 February 2014	2	So Long, See You Tomorrow	Bombay Bicycle Club	1	15 February 2014	1
15 February 2014	1	Hydra	Within Temptation	6	15 February 2014	1
15 February 2014	1	Too Much Information	Maxïmo Park	7	15 February 2014	1
22 February 2014	2	Little Red	Katy B	1	22 February 2014	1
22 February 2014	1	Sun Structures	Temples	7	22 February 2014	1
8 March 2014	1	Morning Phase	Beck	4	8 March 2014	1
8 March 2014	1	Present Tense	Wild Beasts	7	8 March 2014	1
15 March 2014	10	Girl	Pharrell Williams	1	15 March 2014	1
22 March 2014	7	The Take Off and Landing of Everything	Elbow	1	22 March 2014	1
22 March 2014	29	A Perfect Contradiction (#6)	Paloma Faith	2	22 March 2014	2
22 March 2014	12	Love in the Future	John Legend	2	3 May 2014	1
22 March 2014	1	Love Letters	Metronomy	7	22 March 2014	1
29 March 2014	6	Symphonica	George Michael	1	29 March 2014	1
29 March 2014	2	Kiss Me Once	Kylie Minogue	2	29 March 2014	1
29 March 2014	1	In the Arms of an Angel	Nicholas McDonald	6	29 March 2014	1
29 March 2014	1	Going to Hell	The Pretty Reckless	8	29 March 2014	1
29 March 2014	1	Home	Kian Egan	9	29 March 2014	1
5 April 2014	4	The Power of Love	Sam Bailey	1	5 April 2014	1
5 April 2014	4	Going Back Home	Wilko Johnson & Roger Daltrey	3	5 April 2014	1
5 April 2014	1	Timeless	Dr. Hook	9	5 April 2014	1
12 April 2014	5	Education, Education, Education & War	Kaiser Chiefs	1	12 April 2014	2
12 April 2014	3	Out Among the Stars	Johnny Cash	4	12 April 2014	1
12 April 2014	1	Head or Heart	Christina Perri	8	12 April 2014	1
19 April 2014	2	Lift Your Spirit	Aloe Blacc	5	19 April 2014	1
26 April 2014	23	Caustic Love (#4)	Paolo Nutini	1	26 April 2014	3
26 April 2014	3	Meet the Vamps	The Vamps	2	26 April 2014	1
3 May 2014	1	The New Classic	Iggy Azalea	5	3 May 2014	1
3 May 2014	1	The Cautionary Tales of Mark Oliver Everett	Eels	7	26 April 2014	1
10 May 2014	2	Everyday Robots	Damon Albarn	2	10 May 2014	1
10 May 2014	1	Tribal	Imelda May	3	10 May 2014	1
10 May 2014	1	Embrace	Embrace	5	10 May 2014	1
10 May 2014	1	Indie Cindy	Pixies	6	10 May 2014	1
17 May 2014	2	Sheezus	Lily Allen	1	17 May 2014	1
17 May 2014	1	Magic Mountain	Black Stone Cherry	5	17 May 2014	1
17 May 2014	1	Resurrection	Anastacia	9	17 May 2014	1
24 May 2014	5	Xscape	Michael Jackson	1	24 May 2014	1
24 May 2014	2	Turn Blue	The Black Keys	2	24 May 2014	1
24 May 2014	1	Glorious	Foxes	5	24 May 2014	1
24 May 2014	1	First Mind	Nick Mulvey	10	24 May 2014	1
31 May 2014	12	Ghost Stories (#5)	Coldplay	1	31 May 2014	1
31 May 2014	2	What Have We Become?	Paul Heaton & Jacqui Abbott	3	31 May 2014	1
31 May 2014	1	Definitely Maybe	Oasis	5	31 May 2014	1
7 June 2014	76	In the Lonely Hour (#2)	Sam Smith	1	7 June 2014	8
14 June 2014	1	New Eyes	Clean Bandit	3	14 June 2014	1
14 June 2014	1	More Modern Classics	Paul Weller	6	14 June 2014	1
14 June 2014	1	Led Zeppelin: Deluxe Edition	Led Zeppelin	7	14 June 2014	1
14 June 2014	2	Hank	Hank Marvin	8	14 June 2014	1
14 June 2014	1	Led Zeppelin III: Deluxe Edition	Led Zeppelin	10	14 June 2014	1
21 June 2014	5	48:13	Kasabian	1	21 June 2014	1
21 June 2014	1	Lazaretto	Jack White	4	21 June 2014	1
21 June 2014	1	Whispers	Passenger	5	21 June 2014	1
21 June 2014	12	Blue Smoke – The Best Of	Dolly Parton	2	2 August 2014	3
28 June 2014	3	Ultraviolence	Lana Del Rey	1	28 June 2014	1
28 June 2014	2	The Hunting Party	Linkin Park	2	28 June 2014	1
28 June 2014	1	+	Ed Sheeran	9	28 June 2014	1
5 July 2014	77	× (#1)	Ed Sheeran	1	5 July 2014	13
5 July 2014	1	Once More 'Round the Sun	Mastodon	10	5 July 2014	1
12 July 2014	4	5 Seconds of Summer	5 Seconds of Summer	2	12 July 2014	1
12 July 2014	46	Wanted on Voyage (#3)	George Ezra	1	11 October 2014	4
12 July 2014	1	Mutineers	David Gray	10	12 July 2014	1
19 July 2014	1	Futurology	Manic Street Preachers	2	19 July 2014	1
19 July 2014	1	Live Life Living	Example	8	19 July 2014	1
26 July 2014	1	World Peace Is None of Your Business	Morrissey	2	26 July 2014	1
26 July 2014	1	Jungle	Jungle	7	26 July 2014	1
2 August 2014	1	Trouble in Paradise	La Roux	6	2 August 2014	1
9 August 2014	2	The Breeze: An Appreciation of JJ Cale	Eric Clapton & Friends	3	9 August 2014	1
9 August 2014	1	Hypnotic Eye	Tom Petty and the Heartbreakers	7	9 August 2014	1
9 August 2014	1	Welcome to the Jungle	Neon Jungle	8	9 August 2014	1
9 August 2014	1	Nothing but the Beat	David Guetta	9	9 August 2014	1
16 August 2014	1	Long Road Home	Charlie Simpson	10	16 August 2014	1
23 August 2014	1	Get Hurt	The Gaslight Anthem	4	23 August 2014	1
23 August 2014	2	At the Movies	Richard & Adam	5	23 August 2014	1
23 August 2014	1	Native	OneRepublic	9	23 August 2014	1
23 August 2014	1	Finest Selection: The Greatest Hits	The Saturdays	10	23 August 2014	1
30 August 2014	4	Stars	Collabro	1	30 August 2014	1
30 August 2014	2	Concrete Love	Courteeners	3	30 August 2014	1
30 August 2014	1	Great Divide	Twin Atlantic	6	30 August 2014	1
6 September 2014	7	Royal Blood	Royal Blood	1	6 September 2014	1
6 September 2014	2	My Everything	Ariana Grande	3	6 September 2014	1
6 September 2014	2	The Whole Story	Kate Bush	6	6 September 2014	1
6 September 2014	1	Hounds of Love	Kate Bush	9	6 September 2014	1
13 September 2014	1	V	Maroon 5	4	13 September 2014	1
13 September 2014	1	Creation	The Pierces	7	13 September 2014	1
20 September 2014	1	Lullaby and the Ceaseless Roar	Robert Plant	2	20 September 2014	1
20 September 2014	1	Ryan Adams	Ryan Adams	6	20 September 2014	1
20 September 2014	1	Legend	Bob Marley and the Wailers	7	20 September 2014	1
20 September 2014	1	El Pintor	Interpol	9	20 September 2014	1
27 September 2014	6	No Sound Without Silence	The Script	1	27 September 2014	1
27 September 2014	7	Partners	Barbra Streisand	2	27 September 2014	2
27 September 2014	1	X	Chris Brown	4	27 September 2014	1
27 September 2014	1	World on Fire	Slash featuring Myles Kennedy and The Conspirators	7	27 September 2014	1
27 September 2014	1	Bulletproof Picasso	Train	9	27 September 2014	1
27 September 2014	1	The Balcony	Catfish and the Bottlemen	10	27 September 2014	1
4 October 2014	2	This Is All Yours	Alt-J	1	4 October 2014	1
4 October 2014	1	Popular Problems	Leonard Cohen	5	4 October 2014	1
4 October 2014	1	Syro	Aphex Twin	8	4 October 2014	1
4 October 2014	1	Different Shades of Blue	Joe Bonamassa	9	4 October 2014	1
4 October 2014	1	Cheek to Cheek	Tony Bennett & Lady Gaga	10	4 October 2014	1
11 October 2014	1	Carry on the Grudge	Jamie T	4	11 October 2014	1
11 October 2014	1	(What's the Story) Morning Glory?	Oasis	7	11 October 2014	1
11 October 2014	1	Art Official Age	Prince	8	11 October 2014	1
11 October 2014	2	R-Kive	Genesis	7	18 October 2014	1
18 October 2014	15	Hozier ♦	Hozier	3	23 May 2015	1
18 October 2014	1	Our Love	Caribou	8	18 October 2014	1
18 October 2014	1	Playland	Johnny Marr	9	18 October 2014	1
18 October 2014	1	Sirens	Gorgon City	10	18 October 2014	1
25 October 2014	7	Chapter One	Ella Henderson	1	25 October 2014	1
25 October 2014	2	Sweet Talker	Jessie J	5	25 October 2014	1
25 October 2014	1	Songs of Innocence	U2	6	25 October 2014	1
25 October 2014	1	The Story – The Very Best of Spandau Ballet	Spandau Ballet	8	25 October 2014	1
25 October 2014	1	Tough Love	Jessie Ware	9	25 October 2014	1
25 October 2014	1	Rose Ave.	You+Me	10	25 October 2014	1
1 November 2014	2	I Forget Where We Were	Ben Howard	1	1 November 2014	1
1 November 2014	1	.5: The Gray Chapter	Slipknot	2	1 November 2014	1
1 November 2014	2	Melody Road	Neil Diamond	4	1 November 2014	1
1 November 2014	2	Aquostic (Stripped Bare)	Status Quo	5	1 November 2014	1
8 November 2014	43	1989	Taylor Swift	1	8 November 2014	1
8 November 2014	1	Four Symbols: Deluxe Edition	Led Zeppelin	6	8 November 2014	1
8 November 2014	2	Nostalgia	Annie Lennox	9	8 November 2014	1
15 November 2014	3	Motion	Calvin Harris	2	15 November 2014	1
15 November 2014	2	Love in Venice	André Rieu & the Johann Strauss Orchestra	4	15 November 2014	1
15 November 2014	1	My Favourite Faded Fantasy	Damien Rice	7	15 November 2014	1
22 November 2014	6	The Endless River (#9)	Pink Floyd	1	22 November 2014	1
22 November 2014	3	Sonic Highways	Foo Fighters	2	22 November 2014	1
22 November 2014	1	Forever	Queen	5	22 November 2014	1
22 November 2014	1	Only Human	Cheryl	7	22 November 2014	1
29 November 2014	9	Four (#7)	One Direction	1	29 November 2014	1
29 November 2014	2	It's the Girls!	Bette Midler	6	29 November 2014	1
29 November 2014	1	Nothing Has Changed: The Very Best of David Bowie	David Bowie	9	29 November 2014	1
29 November 2014	1	Home Sweet Home	Katherine Jenkins	10	29 November 2014	1
6 December 2014	11	Never Been Better (#8)	Olly Murs	1	6 December 2014	1
6 December 2014	1	Listen	David Guetta	8	6 December 2014	1
13 December 2014	4	III (#10)	Take That	1	13 December 2014	1
13 December 2014	2	Rock or Bust	AC/DC	3	13 December 2014	1
13 December 2014	1	McBusted	McBusted	9	13 December 2014	1

== Entries by artist ==
The following table shows artists who achieved two or more top 10 entries in 2014, including albums that reached their peak in 2013. The figures only include main artists, with featured artists and appearances on compilation albums not counted individually for each artist. The total number of weeks an artist spent in the top ten in 2014 is also shown.

Entries	Artist	Weeks	Albums
3	Led Zeppelin	3	Four Symbols: Deluxe Edition, Led Zeppelin: Deluxe Edition, Led Zeppelin III: Deluxe Edition
2	David Guetta	2	Listen, Nothing but the Beat
2	Ed Sheeran	27	×, +
2	Kate Bush	3	Hounds of Love, The Whole Story
2	Michael Bublé	4	Christmas, To Be Loved
2	Oasis	2	Definitely Maybe, (What's the Story) Morning Glory?
2	Olly Murs	5	Never Been Better, Right Place Right Time
2	One Direction	7	Four, Midnight Memories

== Notes ==
- Hozier reached its peak of number 3 in 2015.
- Christmas (Michael Buble) originally peaked at number-one upon its initial release in 2011. It returned to the top 10 at the end of 2013 around Christmas.
- Bad Blood re-entered the top 10 at number 6 on 11 January 2014 (week ending) for 5 weeks and at number 10 on 22 February 2014 (week ending) for 5 weeks.
- Night Visions re-entered the top 10 at number 9 on 15 March 2014 (week ending).
- To Be Loved re-entered the top 10 at number 6 on 21 December 2013 (week ending) for 3 weeks.
- Home re-entered the top 10 at number 7 on 11 January 2014 (week ending) for 3 weeks and at number 5 on 1 March 2014 (week ending) for 2 weeks.
- Halcyon re-entered the top 10 at number 10 on 26 July 2014 (week ending) for 2 weeks and at number 7 on 16 August 2014 (week ending).
- Settle re-entered the top 10 at number 3 on 1 March 2014 (week ending) for 3 weeks.
- AM re-entered the top 10 at number 8 on 11 January 2014 (week ending) for 2 weeks, at number 2 on 1 March 2014 (week ending) for 4 weeks and at number 8 on 31 May 2014 (week ending) for 2 weeks.
- If You Wait re-entered the top 10 at number 10 on 18 January 2014 (week ending) for 2 weeks, at number 7 on 8 February 2014 (week ending) for 8 weeks, at number 9 on 19 April 2014 (week ending) and at number 10 on 7 June 2014 (week ending).
- True re-entered the top 10 at number 9 on 11 January 2014 (week ending) for 7 weeks and at number 4 on 15 March 2014 (week ending).
- Tribute re-entered the top 10 at number 5 on 11 January 2014 (week ending) for 3 weeks and at number 10 on 1 March 2014 (week ending).
- Prism re-entered the top 10 at number 7 on 15 March 2014 (week ending).
- Moon Landing re-entered the top 10 at number 8 on 1 February 2014 (week ending) and at number 6 on 22 February 2014 (week ending).
- Pure Heroine re-entered the top 10 at number 8 on 8 February 2014 (week ending) for 2 weeks, at number 9 on 1 March 2014 (week ending) for 2 weeks and at number 8 on 22 February 2014 (week ending).
- The Marshall Mathers LP 2 re-entered the top 10 at number 7 on 4 January 2014 (week ending) and at number 10 on 8 February 2014 (week ending).
- Since I Saw You Last re-entered the top 10 at number 9 on 22 February 2014 (week ending), at number 10 on 5 April 2014 (week ending) and at number 2 on 17 May 2014 (week ending) for 2 weeks.
- Girl re-entered the top 10 at number 10 on 31 May 2014 (week ending) for 2 weeks.
- The Take Off and Landing of Everything re-entered the top 10 at number 7 on 26 April 2014 (week ending) for 3 weeks.
- A Perfect Contradiction re-entered the top 10 at number 10 on 2 August 2014 (week ending), at number 6 on 16 August 2014 (week ending) for 4 weeks, at number 9 on 3 January 2015 (week ending) for 4 weeks, at number 8 on 7 March 2015 (week ending) for 3 weeks and at number 10 on 18 April 2015 (week ending).
- Love in the Future re-entered the top 10 at number 6 on 15 November 2014 (week ending).
- Going Back Home re-entered the top 10 at number 9 on 24 May 2014 (week ending).
- Lift Your Spirit re-entered the top 10 at number 10 on 17 May 2014 (week ending).
- Meet the Vamps re-entered the top 10 at number 9 on 7 June 2014 (week ending).
- In the Lonely Hour re-entered the top 10 at number 10 on 8 October 2015 (week ending) for 7 weeks.
- + originally peaked at number-one upon its initial release in 2011.
- Wanted on Voyage re-entered the top 10 at number 10 on 23 July 2015 (week ending) for 2 weeks.
- Nothing but the Beat originally peaked at number two upon its initial release in 2011.
- Royal Blood re-entered the top 10 at number 3 on 7 March 2015 (week ending) for 3 weeks.
- The Whole Story originally peaked at number 2 upon its initial release in 1986, rising to number-one in 1987.
- Hounds of Love originally peaked at number-one upon its initial release in 1985.
- Legend originally peaked at number-one upon its initial release in 1984.
- No Sound Without Silence re-entered the top 10 at number 9 on 15 November 2014 (week ending) and at number 10 on 10 January 2015 (week ending).
- Partners re-entered the top 10 at number 9 on 27 December 2014 (week ending).
- Hozier re-entered the top 10 at number 10 on 17 January 2015 (week ending) for 8 weeks, at number 6 on 16 May 2015 (week ending) for 4 weeks, at number 8 on 9 July 2015 (week ending) and at number 9 on 30 July 2015 (week ending).
- Chapter One re-entered the top 10 at number 8 on 3 January 2015 (week ending) for 4 weeks.
- 1989 re-entered the top 10 at number 4 on 4 July 2015 (week ending) for 9 weeks and at number 8 on 7 January 2016 (week ending).
- Motion re-entered the top 10 at number 8 on 10 January 2015 (week ending).
- Never Been Better re-entered the top 10 at number 9 on 3 December 2015 (week ending) and at number 10 on 31 December 2015 (week ending).
- Figure includes album that peaked in 2013.

== See also ==
- 2014 in British music
- List of number-one albums from the 2000s (UK)
