= Shereen Cutkelvin =

Scottish media personality (born 1996)

- Born: 2 December 1996 (age 29); Edinburgh, Scotland
- Occupations: Singer; presenter; actress
- Years active: 2013–present
- Employer: BBC
- Works: Neon Jungle discography; solo discography; filmography
- Partner(s): Jamaal Shurland (2017–present; engaged)
- Musical career
- Genres: Pop; R&B
- Instrument: Vocals
- Formerly of: Neon Jungle; The Cutkelvins

Shereen Cutkelvin (born 2 December 1996) is a Scottish singer, presenter and actress. She rose to prominence in 2013 when she was placed in the line up of RCA Records' girl group Neon Jungle. The group released the album Welcome to the Jungle (2014), which featured the song "Braveheart", which peaked at number four on the UK Singles Chart. Following Neon Jungle's separation in 2015, she was a member of the Cutkelvins alongside her brothers. The group competed on the fourteenth series of The X Factor in 2017.

Following her musical successes, Cutkelvin navigated towards a career in presenting. She began co-hosting BBC Introducing on BBC Radio Scotland from 2020 to 2024, as well as going to host the early breakfast show for BBC Radio 1. Cutkelvin joined the regular presenting line up of CBBC's Saturday Mash-Up! in 2023, as well as hosting their music magazine show Love! Love! Love!. In 2024, she began presenting the BBC's coverage of TRNSMT. Cutkelvin has also appeared in various television series in acting roles, including Crime (2022) and Annika (2023).

== Early and personal life ==
Cutkelvin was born in Edinburgh on 2 December 1996. Raised in Lanark, South Lanarkshire, she is of British and Belizean descent. She has five siblings, as well as being the granddaughter of Barbara Lennon, the second cousin of John Lennon. Cutkelvin has mentioned that she feels she was "born in the wrong generation" and has expressed her love for Motown and soulful music, including Diana Ross and the Temptations.

In 2017, Cutkelvin began a relationship with The X Factor co-star Jamaal Shurland of Rak-Su. The couple announced their engagement in 2025.

== Career ==
=== 2013–2021: Neon Jungle and the Cutkelvins ===
Cutkelvin posted music videos on YouTube, from which she was discovered and invited to audition for Neon Jungle by RCA Records. She got the call to confirm her place in the group in February 2013 on her way back to her home in Scotland. She moved to London to be in Neon Jungle, with the group recording material that same month. In August 2013, Neon Jungle released their debut single "Trouble", which entered the UK Singles Chart at number 12 and reached the top 10 on the US Billboard Dance/Electronic Digital Songs chart. Neon Jungle's second single, "Braveheart", was released in the UK in January 2014 and peaked at number four on the UK Singles Chart.

Neon Jungle's third single, "Welcome to the Jungle", debuted at number seven. The same month, they were signed to RCA Records in the United States. Their debut album, Welcome to the Jungle, was released in July 2014. The group's contract with RCA Records was terminated in May 2015, but Cutkelvin stated that they were searching for a new label, writing new material and continuing to perform live. In July 2015, Neon Jungle announced via social media that they were disbanding.

In 2017, Cutkelvin and two of her brothers, Jay and Kyle, auditioned for the fourteenth series of The X Factor as a group, the Cutkelvins. Alongside the group, they reached the semi-finals of the series and performed on The X Factor live tour in 2018 across the UK and Ireland. They released music as a group until 2021. In 2019, Cutkelvin, alongide Jay, appeared on Black & Scottish, a programme on STV about their experiences being Black and Scottish. They delivered a spoken word piece about their pride to be Black. In 2020, Cutkelvin began co-hosting BBC Introducing on BBC Radio Scotland.

=== 2022–present: Presenting ventures and acting roles ===
In 2022, Cutkelvin made her acting debut in the Britbox series Crime. She appeared as Sophie Lawrence-Brown in six episodes. Later that year, she appeared in an episode of Van der Valk. She then co-hosted Capital FM's breakfast show alongside Fat Brestovci. Also in 2022, Cutkelvin began fronting CBBC's Love! Love! Love!, a magazine style show about music. The series aired until 2023.

Whilst presenting Love! Love! Love!, Cutkelvin joined the regular presenting line up for CBBC's Saturday Mash-Up!, joining during its fifth series.In 2023, Cutkelvin appeared in an episode of Alibi's Annika. In 2024, Cutkelvin stopped hosting BBC Introducing for BBC Radio Scotland. She was then a guest judge on an episode of Style it Out, as well as becoming the presenter of the BBC's coverage of the Scottish music festival TRNSMT. She returned as its host in 2025 and 2026.

== Discography ==
List of singles released, showing year released and album name
Title	Year	Album
"Relapse"	2022	Non album singles
"Lovers to Strangers"	2022	Non album singles
"Breathing" (with Sherman de Vries)	2022	Non album singles
"Monsters" (with Sherman de Vries)	2022	Non album singles
"Insomnia" (with Sherman de Vries and Navaro)	2023	Non album singles
"Before I Die" (with Sherman de Vries and Navaro)	2023	Non album singles
"Better" (with Sherman de Vries and Navaro)	2023	Non album singles
"Let Me Down Slowly" (with Sherman de Vries and Navaro)	2023	Non album singles
"Habits (Stay High)" (with Sherman de Vries and Navaro)	2024	Non album singles
"Too Much is Not Enough" (with Leventis)	2025	Non album singles

== Filmography ==
Year	Title	Role	Notes
2017	The X Factor	Herself	Contestant
2019	Black & Scottish	Herself	Cameo
2022	Crime	Sophie Lawrence-Brown	Recurring role
2022–present	Saturday Mash-Up!	Presenter	Main cast member
2022	Van der Valk	Elisha Cloovers	Episode: "Payback in Amsterdam"
2023	Annika	January Deacon	Guest role
2024	Style it Out	Judge	Cameo
2024	Sandra Gets a New Fringe	Kelly	Short film
2026	Summerwater	Millie Nkene	Main cast member
2026	Mint	Ticket Person	Guest role
