= Welcome to the Jungle (disambiguation) =

"Welcome to the Jungle" is a 1987 song by Guns N' Roses.

Welcome to the Jungle may also refer to:

== Books and comics ==
- Welcome to the Jungle (comics), a prequel to Jim Butcher's The Dresden Files book series, 2008
- Welcome to the Jungle: New Positions in Black Cultural Studies, a book by Kobena Mercer, 1994

== Film and television ==
- Welcome to the Jungle (2003 film), also known as The Rundown, an American film
- Welcome to the Jungle (2007 film), an American horror film
- Welcome to the Jungle (2013 film), an American comedy film starring Jean-Claude Van Damme
- "Welcome to the Jungle" (Entourage), an episode of Entourage, 2007
- "Welcome to the Jungle" (Legends of Tomorrow), an episode of Legends of Tomorrow
- "Welcome to the Jungle", an episode of Power Rangers Jungle Fury, 2008
- Jumanji: Welcome to the Jungle, a 2017 film
- Welcome to the Jungle (2026 film), an Indian Hindi-language film

== Music ==
- Welcome to the Jungle (Franco "El Gorila" album), 2009
- Welcome to the Jungle (Neon Jungle album), 2014
  - "Welcome to the Jungle" (Neon Jungle song), the album's title track
- "Welcome to the Jungle" (Jay-Z and Kanye West song), 2011
- "Welcome to the Jungle", a 2013 song by Hardwell, with Alvaro and Mercer, featuring Lil Jon, from Hardwell presents 'Revealed Volume 4'
