= Joe Tasker (presenter) =

British television presenter and youtuber (born 1993)

- Born: Joe David Tasker; 30 July 1993 (age 33); Leeds, West Yorkshire, England
- Education: University of Teesside
- Occupations: Television presenter; social media content creator
- Years active: 2013–present
- Partner: Jack Biggs

Joe David Tasker (born 30 July 1993) is an English television presenter, YouTuber and social media content creator. He has presented on CBBC since 2019.

== Career ==
Tasker presented CBBC HQ from 2019 to 2022, and is the co-presenter of Saturday Mash-Up! with Shereen Cutkelvin and recurring presenter Kia Pegg. Tasker also co-hosts the debate podcast Settle It with Lee Hinchcliffe. He then hosted Swipe It!, a show on POP and POP Max.

In 2022 Tasker co-hosted Bro's in Control for CBBC, along with Adam and Callum Beales. A second series was commissioned in September 2023.

As of 2023, his YouTube channel has approximately 220,000 subscribers.

== Personal life ==
Tasker was born in Leeds, West Yorkshire. He studied Performance for Live and Recorded Media at Teesside University, graduating in 2014.

Tasker came out as gay on 12 February 2023 and confirmed that he had been in a relationship with fellow YouTuber Jack Biggs since 2019.
