= Jessica Plummer =

English singer and actress (born 1992)

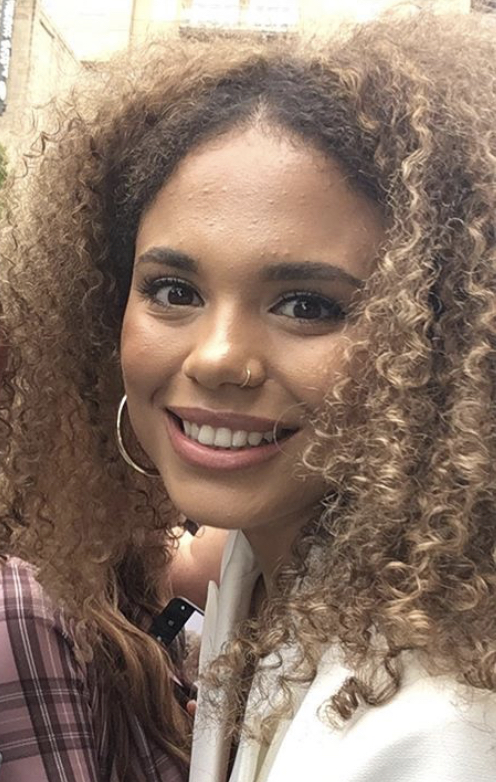
- Plummer in 2019
- Born: Jessica Kate Plummer; 16 September 1992 (age 34); London, England
- Education: Identity School of Acting
- Occupations: Singer; rapper; actress
- Years active: 2012–present
- Children: 1

Jessica Kate Plummer (born 16 September 1992) is an English actress, singer and rapper. From 2013 to 2015, she was a member of the British girl group Neon Jungle, with whom she released an album that peaked at number eight on the UK Albums Chart. She is also known for her roles as Chantelle Atkins in the BBC soap opera EastEnders (2019–2020) and as Emma in the BBC drama series The Girl Before (2021) for which she was nominated for a British Academy Television Award for Best Supporting Actress.

Aside from her singing and acting career, Plummer has also ventured into reality television; she appeared in the twentieth series of I'm a Celebrity...Get Me Out of Here in 2020.

== Early life and education ==
Jessica Kate Plummer was born on 16 September 1992 in London to a Jamaican father and an English mother.

She went to Burntwood School and the Hayes School for secondary education.

== Career ==
In November 2012, music manager David Cooper began a three-month process of auditions for a new girl group to be signed to RCA Records UK. Plummer, as well as Amira McCarthy, were separately scouted while shopping in London, while Shereen Cutkelvin and Asami Zdrenka were found via their solo YouTube videos. In February 2013, it was announced that Plummer, alongside Cutkelvin, McCarthy, and Zdrenka made the line-up of new British girl group Neon Jungle. They chose the name Neon Jungle, which was derived from their song "Welcome to the Jungle", to reflect that the members were "all individual and quite different". According to Plummer, "it's like neon is bold, bright, strong individual characters and then the jungle part is the madness". In July 2013, Neon Jungle released their debut single "Trouble", which entered the UK Singles Chart at number 12 and reached the top 10 on the US Billboard Dance/Electronic Digital Songs chart. In October 2013, Plummer, with Neon Jungle, supported Jessie J on select dates of her Alive Tour. The following month, the group performed at the annual Victoria's Secret Fashion Show. Also in October 2013, Plummer made her television debut in British science fantasy television series Wizards vs Aliens as Chloe Martin. She played the role for two episodes. In November 2013, Neon Jungle's second single, "Braveheart", was released in the UK. The song peaked at number four on the UK Singles Chart and at number 19 on the ARIA charts. On 28 July 2014, Neon Jungle released their debut album Welcome to the Jungle, which entered the UK Albums Chart at number eight. The album also entered the ARIA charts, debuting at number 48. On 6 July 2015, Neon Jungle announced via their Facebook page that they were disbanding.

In November 2015, it was announced that Plummer has joined the cast of John Cameron Mitchell's directed romantic-comedy film How to Talk to Girls at Parties opposite Ruth Wilson, Nicole Kidman, Elle Fanning and Matt Lucas. It premiered at the 2017 Cannes Film Festival in May 2017. In March 2019, Plummer joined the BBC soap opera EastEnders, playing Chantelle Atkins. While on the soap, her character was involved in a high-profile domestic abuse storyline, with her on-screen husband Gray Atkins (Toby-Alexander Smith) abusing Chantelle. In September 2020, it was announced that as part of the storyline, Gray would murder Chantelle, in order to reflect the mortality rates displayed in abusive relationships and highlight the impact of the COVID-19 pandemic on domestic violence. She made her last appearance in an episode broadcast on 22 September 2020.

In November 2020, Plummer began competing in the twentieth series of I'm a Celebrity...Get Me Out of Here. She became the sixth celebrity to be eliminated alongside Russell Watson on 1 December 2020. Plummer starred as Emma in the 2021 miniseries The Girl Before, which earned her nominations for the British Academy Television Award for Best Supporting Actress and for Drama Performance at the 27th National Television Awards.

== Personal life ==
In July 2016, Plummer gave birth to a daughter.

== Filmography ==
Film
Year	Title	Role	Notes
2013	Reflections	Kaitlin	Short film
2017	How to Talk to Girls at Parties	Celia	
2023	The After	Amanda	Short film; main role
2024	Tell That to the Winter Sea	Lily	

Television
Year	Title	Role	Notes
2013	Wizards vs Aliens	Chloe Martin	2 episodes
2019–2020	EastEnders	Chantelle Atkins	Series regular; 127 episodes
2020	EastEnders: Secrets from the Square	Herself	Episode: "Karen, Chantelle and Gray"
2020	I'm a Celebrity...Get Me Out Of Here!	Herself	Series 20 contestant
2021	The Girl Before	Emma Matthews	Main role
2024	The Decameron	Filomena	Main role
2025	Missing You	Stacey Embalo	Main role
2025	Play for Today	Amy Harrison	Episode: "Special Measures"

== Awards and nominations ==
Year	Award	Category	Work	Result	Ref.
2019	TV Choice Awards	Best Soap Newcomer	EastEnders	Nominated	
2019	Inside Soap Awards	Best Newcomer	EastEnders	Shortlisted	
2019	I Talk Telly Awards	Best Soap Newcomer	EastEnders	Nominated	
2019	Digital Spy Reader Awards	Best Soap Newcomer	EastEnders	Second	
2020	TV Choice Awards	Best Soap Actress	EastEnders	Nominated	
2020	I Talk Telly Awards	Best Soap Partnership (shared with Toby-Alexander Smith)	EastEnders	Nominated	
2020	Inside Soap Awards	Best Actress	EastEnders	Won	
2020	Digital Spy Reader Awards	Best Soap Female Actor	EastEnders	Won	
2022	British Academy Television Awards	Best Supporting Actress	The Girl Before	Nominated	
2022	27th National Television Awards	Drama Performance	The Girl Before	Nominated	
2022	National Film Awards UK	Best Supporting Actress in a TV Series	The Girl Before	Nominated	

== See also ==
- List of I'm a Celebrity...Get Me Out of Here! (British TV series) contestants
