= Misan Harriman =

British photographer (born 1977)

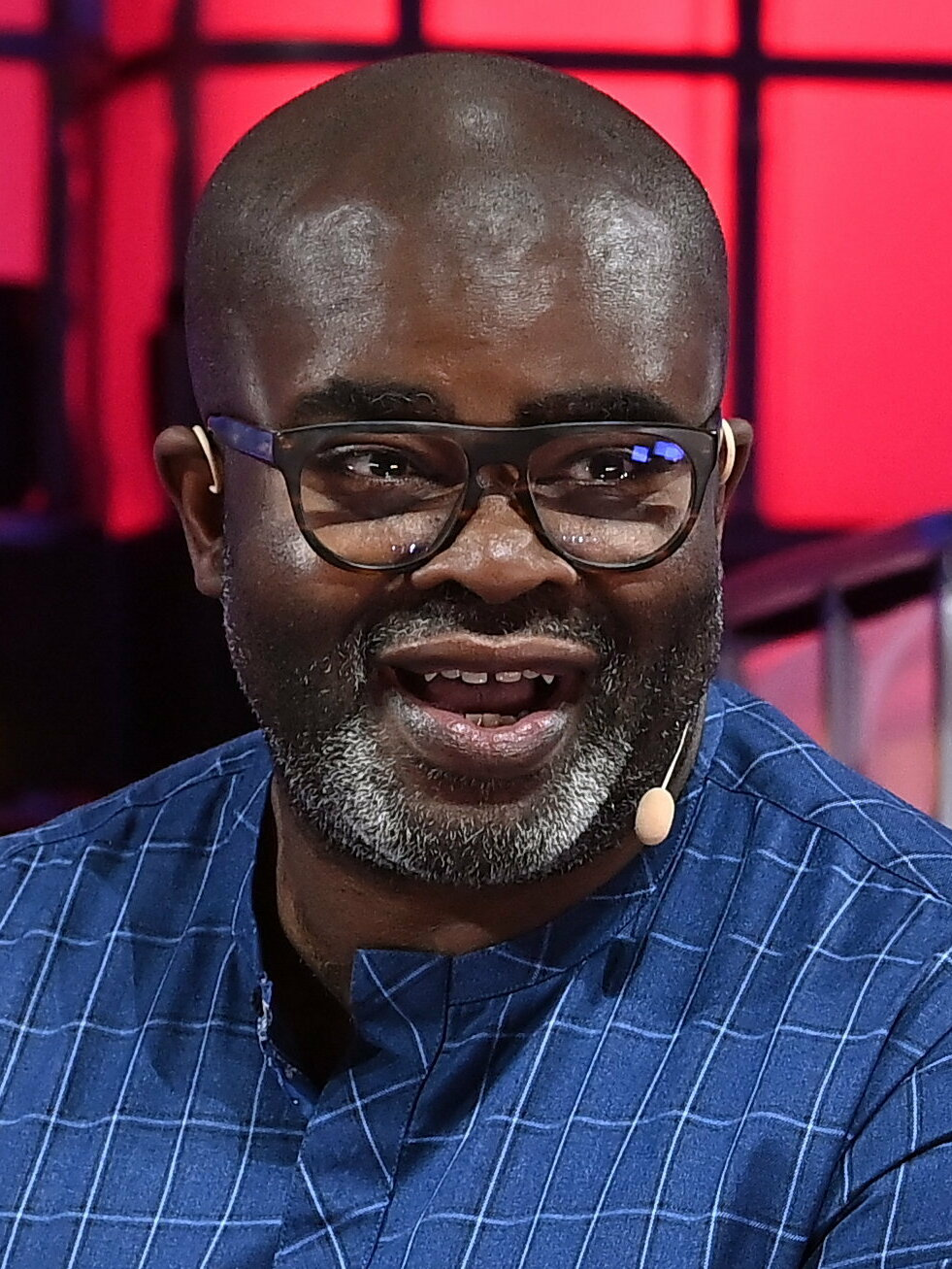
- Harriman in 2022
- Born: 15 December 1977 (age 48); Calabar, Cross River State, Nigeria
- Education: Stubbington House School; Bradfield College
- Occupations: Photographer, entrepreneur, social activist
- Years active: 2017–present
- Organizations: Southbank Centre
- Known for: Photography
- Spouse: Camilla Holmstroem
- Children: 2
- Website: misanharriman.com

Misan Harriman (born 15 December 1977) is a Nigerian-born British photographer, entrepreneur and social activist. As well as being one of the most widely-shared photographers of the Black Lives Matter movement, Harriman is the first Black man to shoot a cover of British Vogue. In July 2021, Harriman commenced his appointment as Chair of the board of trustees for the Southbank Centre, London. In October 2025, he was named as one of the UK's most influential black people in the 2026 Powerlist.

== Early life ==
Harriman was born in Calabar, Nigeria, in 1977. He is the son of Chief Hope Harriman, a billionaire businessman and politician from Warri in Nigeria's Delta State. Chief Harriman was a titleholder in the Nigerian chieftaincy system and a descendant of King Akengbuwa I, an Olu of Warri in the 18th and 19th centuries. Harriman's paternal grandfather was Arthur Leonard Harriman (1899–1991) from Romford, Essex, United Kingdom. He was the son of John Leonard Harriman and Alice Isabelle Smith. Arthur Leonard, the father of Hope, was transferred from the United Kingdom to Nigeria, as a staff member of John Holt & Co. (Liverpool) Ltd, to further Britain's commercial and expansionist interest in the Niger Delta, most especially Warri.

Harriman attended Stubbington House School and Bradfield College in England. After school, he worked in recruitment in the City of London.

== Photographic career ==
Harriman was interested in photography from an early age, this including giving a presentation at school, aged nine, on Stanley Kubrick's use of light in Barry Lyndon (1975). In 2016, Harriman set up an Internet media agency, What We Seee. He began photographing in 2017 and is self-taught.

=== Celebrities ===
Harriman's photographic career has included photographing celebrities, including Rihanna, Stormzy, Olivia Colman, Princess Beatrice, Meghan, Duchess of Sussex, Cate Blanchett, Chiwetel Ejiofor and Tom Cruise. In early 2021, Harriman remotely took the photograph used to announce the pregnancy of Meghan, Duchess of Sussex. In June 2022, Harriman photographed one-year-old Lilibet Mountbatten-Windsor.

=== Reportage ===
Harriman documented the Extinction Rebellion, climate strike and anti-Trump protests in 2019. In the spring of 2020, he took a series of pictures of people living through the COVID-19 lockdown in his home town of Woking in a project called Lost in Isolation. His pictures of the Black Lives Matter protests taken in the summer of 2020, following the murder of George Floyd, appeared on the BBC and in Vogue magazine and The Guardian, and in July were shown on the Piccadilly Lights at Piccadilly Circus in Central London. Harriman's triple gatefold cover for the September issue of Vogue—traditionally the most important issue of the year—included portraits of Adwoa Aboah, Marcus Rashford and 18 other activists associated with the Black Lives Matter movement from around the globe. Harriman was assisted by two photographers, Cornelius Walker and Ron Timehin.

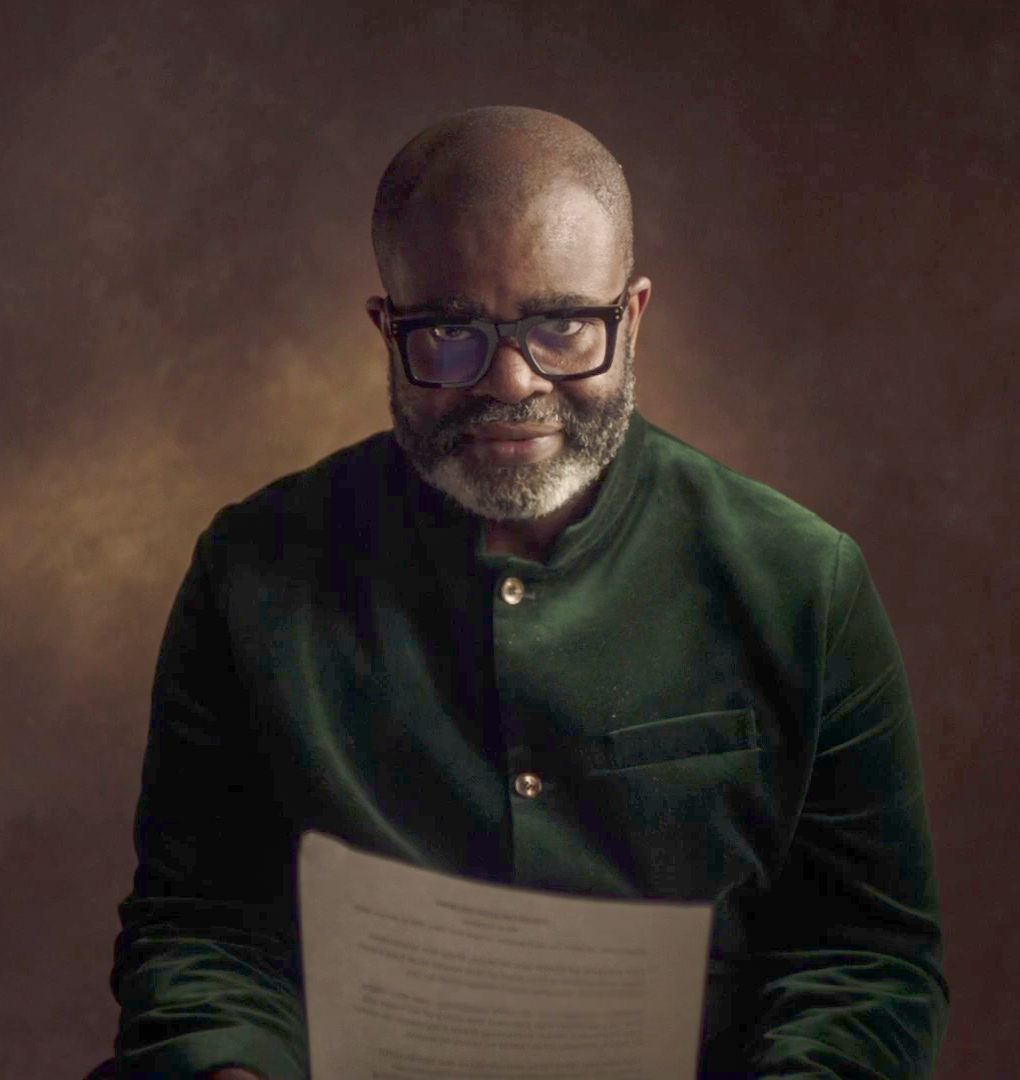
Harriman participating in a plea over the Gaza conflict in 2024

In 2024, much of Harriman's documentary work revolved around the protests in London urging for a ceasefire in the Gaza war.

In 2025, Harriman had his first major exhibition at Hope 93 in Fitzrovia, London, featuring his work between 2019 and 2025 on global activism.

Shoot the People, a documentary about Harriman's life as an activist and photographer, was released by Watermelon Pictures in June 2026. Tribute is paid in the film to South African anti-apartheid photographer Peter Magubane, an inspirational figure for Harriman.

== Other activities ==
In July 2021, Harriman took up the appointment of chair of trustees of the Southbank Centre.

Having been working with Save the Children, since 2020, Harriman was appointed an ambassador for the international non-governmental organization in 2022.

In 2023, he made his directorial debut with The After, a short film about a man who lost his family in a stabbing spree, starring David Oyelowo. The film, produced by Nicky Bentham for Netflix, was nominated for Best Live Action Short Film at the 2024 Academy Awards.

== Public statements ==
After the Golders Green stabbing attacks in April 2026, Harriman criticised the media for providing lesser coverage of the initial victim, who was Muslim, than it provided to the two later victims, who were wearing Orthodox Jewish clothing. After the 2026 UK local election in May, in which Reform UK performed very well, Harriman quoted Susan Sontag's comments about the Holocaust: "10% of people in any population are cruel no matter what, and 10% are merciful no matter what, and the other – this is important – the other remaining 80% could be moved in either direction. It's such a profound way to look at us. In the context of yesterday's election result, it is something which I think is really topical". In June, Harriman commented on mass protests in Albania against the proposed Sazan Island Resort backed by Jared Kushner and Ivanka Trump. In a social media post, Harriman shared a link to a post that said Kushner and Ivanka Trump were "selling off the Albanian coastline to Jewish billionaires and [an] Israeli military project".

The Campaign Against Antisemitism said some of Harriman's comments were inflammatory. Following complaints from more than 64 MPs and peers, Lisa Nandy said that the Charity Commission, Arts Council England, and the Southbank Centre were reviewing the matter, with the Arts Council holding the power to suspend or withdraw public funding if grant conditions were found to have been breached.

Writing in The Guardian, Lanre Bakare said that part of the British establishment was upset at the positive reception of Harriman's views by the public and that Harriman had received negative coverage in The Daily Telegraph, The Times, The Daily Mail, The Daily Express and GB News. An open letter petition signed by Mark Ruffalo, Susan Sarandon, Gary Lineker, Greta Thunberg, Tracey Emin, Benjamin Moser and others said Harriman was the victim of a smear campaign by right-wing newspapers. A separate online pledge of support for Harriman received more than 100,000 signatures.

In June 2026, Harriman announced that he would step down as chair of trustees of the Southbank Centre in autumn 2026. He and the Southbank Centre stated that the decision was made in January and was unrelated to the controversy surrounding his public statements and social media activity.

== Personal life ==
Harriman is married to Camilla Holmstroem. They have two daughters.

== Awards and recognition ==
- In 2022, Harriman received an honorary fellowship from SOAS University of London.
- In 2023, Harriman received an honorary doctorate from Ravensbourne University.
