= Saturday Mash-Up! =

- Also known as: Saturday Mash-Up: House Party
- Genre: Entertainment
- Presented by: Hacker T. Dog; Jonny Nelson; Yasmin Evans; Stanley; Joe Tasker; Harpz Kaur; Kia Pegg; Shereen Cutkelvin
- Country of origin: United Kingdom
- Original language: English
- No. of series: 9
- No. of episodes: 228

Production
- Executive producers: Ian France; Sean Murphy
- Producer: Jamie Wilson
- Production locations: Dock10 Studios (2017–2021); BBC Pacific Quay (2022–present)
- Running time: 120 minutes (2017–2020); 150 minutes (2020–present)
- Production company: BBC Studios Kids & Family Productions

Original release
- Network: CBBC (2018-present); BBC Two (2017)
- Release: 30 September 2017 – present

Saturday Mash-Up! is a live British children's magazine entertainment programme on CBBC, first broadcast on 30 September 2017. It is currently presented by Joe Tasker, Shereen Cutkelvin and a puppet monster called Stanley performed by Dave Chapman, Kia Pegg is a recurring presenter in the show.

During a series, the show broadcasts live from BBC Pacific Quay Studios, in Glasgow every Saturday morning. It includes celebrity guests, games, sketches and CBBC shows, and focuses on live chat with children across the United Kingdom, either on the phone or via the web.

== History ==
It is CBBC's first series in this genre since TMi moved to Fridays in 2010. It is said to "continue the tradition of iconic Saturday morning programmes such as Live & Kicking, Going Live!, Saturday Superstore, Dick & Dom in da Bungalow and Multi-Coloured Swap Shop" The show's working title was Live & Dangerous.

Series 2 aired from 29 September 2018 on CBBC.

Series 3 started on 1 February 2020 but was paused due to the COVID-19 pandemic, the show was subsequently presented from Joe Tasker, Harpz Kaur, and (puppeteer) Dave Chapman's houses via video-link under the name Saturday Mash-Up! House Party, from 4 April until the end of the series on 30 May. The 3rd series resumed on 7 November to broadcast the remaining episodes in the series.

Spin-off series Summer Mash-Up aired during the 2020 summer holidays in a 30-minute Thursday afternoon slot (temporarily replacing Blue Peter). In 2018 and 2019, special programmes were also produced as part of the CBBC Summer Social TV coverage.

The show originally aired until 11am but was expanded to 11:30am in Series 3. In the Christmas 2020 episode Part 1 aired from 9am-9:30am with a 45 minute break at 09:30 due to 2 Christmas specials on CBBC and CBeebies. Guests picked what they were going to watch and the 2nd part began at 10:15 and ended at 12:15. It is also the first time a Saturday morning kids show has run into the afternoon since 1993.

Series 4 returned to the traditional studio format, but with guests social distancing and no studio audience due to ongoing COVID-19 guidelines.

Series 5 saw the studio audience return. On Saturday 10 and 17 September 2022 the show was off-air due to the UK national period of mourning for the death of Queen Elizabeth II. The final episode of series 5 aired on the CBBC channel the same day as the coronation of King Charles III and Queen Camilla.

Series 6 ran from 8 July to 30 December 2023 with Shereen Cutkelvin joining the show as the new co-host, having previously done voice-overs on Series 5.

Series 7 began on 13 July 2024. In series 7 Saturday Mash-Up! made a world record for the world record relay slime attempt. In December 2024 the show celebrated its 200th episode.

Series 8 began on 23 August 2025.

Series 9 began on 5 September 2026.

== Segments ==
=== Competition Caravan ===
It's a competition in a caravan. Celebrity guests bring prizes to add to the show's prize caddy for a viewer to win at the end of the show.

=== Bog Off ===
Two celebrity guests each compete in a driving challenge through the studio and backstage and while on the course they can collect up 3 toilet rolls that can help decrease your points or can help increase your points.

=== Slime After Slime ===
Two teams play this game. To see who is going first, they flip a coin. This game is very simple - there are 11 boxes, and 10 of them contain slime. The kid will choose a box to send their adult to, the adult will open it, and slime will come out the top of the box. The game is to find two boxes with the same colour slime to get a point.

=== Shereen Sing-Song Guess Along ===
Each week, Shereen sings one of her songs. People who play the game from their home have to guess what she is singing about, and for every correct guess, they get one point.

=== Britain's Silliest Face ===
Viewers are asked to pull silly faces and send in pictures. Joe and Harpz then rate them out of five.

=== Mash-Up Monarch ===
Each week, a viewer watching at home is chosen to make various decisions. These include choosing what episode of a programme to show and choosing who does a task like tidying up the studio or eating a gross item.

=== Push Off ===
Two celebrities must push a shopping trolley into a pyramid of 800 toilet rolls to see how many they can collect. Each toilet roll is worth a point, with the golden toilet roll being worth 10 points and the brown toilet roll causing them to lose 5 points. They can choose between 3 trollies, which change each week. While the crew count the rolls, Johnny Nelson played a game with the contestant called "Jonny's random supermarket item pricing game while we count the toilet rolls". This was changed for later series and replaced with "How Much?" and "Whose Shop?", both led by Joe Tasker. The celebrity loser is then asked to pie themself.

=== Stars Behind Bars ===
A celebrity is 'locked up in jail' and answers as many questions they can in 100 seconds.

=== Detention Seekers ===
A/two celebrity/s is put in detention and has to answer questions about themselves until the school bell rings. On one occasion, instead of a celebrity, Penfold from Danger Mouse was used.

=== Tongue Twister ===
Celebrities go head to head in a giant spinning wheel and try to get food down a throat hole. Large food items are thrown in, including mystery superfoods with plus or minus points written on. After running in the wheel for thirty seconds, celebs are taken to Joe's relaxation area and asked to "Say Ahhhh" while the points are added up. After some dentist themed jokes, the scores are announced and the celebrities are added to the leader board.

=== Sketches ===
Each week during the show they complete a sketch which lasts a few minutes. Sketches include the presenters in the show and sometimes the guests appearing in the sketch. Some of the sketches through each series have been in a shop, hotel or in a spaceship which is called Doctor Doctor that has appeared in season 7.

== End of Show ==
=== Gunging ===
==== Series 1 ====
For the final segment of the program, the viewers watching the show vote on who they want to be covered with gunge, from a selection of two, three or four options. In the first show, Steve Backshall was chosen. In series 1, the celebrity voted was gunged in a "gunging ceremony" with the help of the other guests that appeared in the program.

==== Series 2 onwards ====
As of Series 2, viewers' chosen celebrity has 90 seconds to answer questions which are based on that week's news. They can avoid being covered with slime by answering the question correctly; if they answer incorrectly, they have a bucket of slime poured over them. At the end of the ninety seconds, the celebrity must answer a final question, which is always outlandish and nearly impossible to answer correctly. If answered incorrectly, the celebrity is slimed heavily with multiple buckets (Commonly known as "Super Slime"). To date, no one has ever answered the final question correctly. However, should the person get the question correctly, the person is rewarded 20 points to their score but gets slimed nevertheless.

In the Christmas episodes, there is no slime vote. All guests get covered in slime and sing a Christmas song. However, in the Christmas 2021 episode, there was no Christmas sliming, instead a person would pull a Christmas Cracker with confetti being released, the three people who have green confetti are automatically safe, while the person with red confetti gets slimed.

From Series 4 onwards, Question Slime was replaced by Slime O'Clock News, where the format was the same, but it had a different layout.

A new slime game started in Series 5 known as Mashtermind, named after the BBC quiz show Mastermind. The slime game for series 7 was named Strictly Come Sliming, after the British dance competition Strictly Come Dancing.

Celebrities who have been gunged/slimed include Steve Backshall, DanTDM, Vick Hope, Kimberly Wyatt, Naomi Wilkinson, Lindsey Russell (twice), New Hope Club, Road Trip, Oti Mabuse, Lewys Ball, Olivia Grace and Lovevie, Colson Smith, Mark Rhodes, Briony Williams, Cat Henstridge, Bella Ramsey, Dani Harmer and Jenny Richardson.

==== Final Bits of Show ====
When the sliming ceremony has been completed, the hosts phone the lucky winner of the competition in the caravan and then the hosts give a recap of what will happen in next week's program. Finally, the theme music plays one more time as the hosts and guests say goodbye. The show ends there and CBBC resumes their programming as usual.

== Content ==
=== Programmes ===
Name	Duration	Series
Danger Mouse	2017–2022	1–4
OOglies	2017	1
Zig and Zag	2017	1
Dennis & Gnasher: Unleashed!	2017	1
Odd Squad	2017, 2021–2022	1, 4
The Next Step	2017	1
Dragons: Race to the Edge	2018–2020	2–3
The Zoo	2018	2
Potato Party	2018–	2
Boy Girl Dog Cat Mouse Cheese	2020–2022, 2024–	3–4, 7–
She-Ra and the Princesses of Power	2020	3
Crackerjack!	2020	3
Ninja Express	2021–2023	4–6
We Bare Bears	2022–2023	5
Summer Camp Island	2022–2023	5
Grizzy & the Lemmings	2023–	6–
Taffy	2023	6
Total DramaRama	2023–	6–
Pokémon the Series: XYZ	2023–2024	6–7
SpongeBob SquarePants	2025–	8–
Duck & Frog	2026–	9–

=== Presenters ===
Name	Duration	Series
Jonny Nelson	2017–2019	1–2
Yasmin Evans	2017–2019	1–2
Hacker T. Dog	2017–2019	1–2
Harpz Kaur	2020–2022	3–5
Joe Tasker	2020–	3–
Stanley The Monster	2020–	3–
Kia Pegg	2022–	4–
Shereen Cutkelvin	2023–	6–

=== Segments ===
Name	Duration	Series
How Many Things in the Thing?	2017–2020	1–3
Make Me Viral	2017–2018	1–2
Mash-Up Monarch	2017	1
Push Off	2017–2019, 2021	1–2 ,4
Stars Behind Bars	2017	1
Musical Toilets	2018–2020, 2022–2024	2–4, 6-7
Detention Seekers	2018–2019	2
Question Slime	2018–2020	2–3
Briefs Encounter	2020–	3–
Home-school Showdown	2021–	4
Showeroke	2021–2023	4–6
Senseless	2022–2025	5–8
Easy as Pie	2022–2023	5–6
Saturday Knight Fever	2022	5
Slime O'Clock News / Slime and Punishment	2021–2022	4
MashterMind	2022	5
Slops & Robbers	2023	5
Jurassic Lark	2023	6
Slime Showdown	2023	6
School of Slime	2023	6
Joe vs Shereen	2024-2026	7-9
Strictly Come Sliming	2024	7
Mash Car Rally	2024	7
Back to the Drawing Board	2024	7
Game of Homes	2024	7
Splat Stanley	2024	7
Slime A Celebrity... Get Me Out Of Here	2025	8
Bog Off	2025	8
Slime After Slime	2025	8
The Slimers	2026	9
Stanley Moving house	2026	9

=== Things ===
Name	Duration	Series
Pie In The Face	2017–2019, 2021–	1–2, 4, 7
Gunging	2017	1
Slime	2018–	2–

== Transmissions ==
Series	Start date	End date	Episodes
1	30 September 2017	16 December 2017	12
2	29 September 2018	2 February 2019	20
3	1 February 2020	27 March 2021	35
4	24 April 2021	26 March 2022	44
5	23 April 2022	6 May 2023	44
6	8 July 2023	30 December 2023	26
7	13 July 2024	21 December 2024	24
8	23 August 2025	20 December 2025	18
9	5 September 2026	December 2026	16
