= Day One (Snob Scrilla album) =

Studio album by Snob Scrilla
- Released: 24 April 2009
- Genre: Hip Hop
- Length: 51:00
- Label: Ivy League Records

Singles from Day One
- 1. "There You Go Again" Released: 2008; 2. "Houston" Released: 2008; 3. "Heartbreak Scorsese" Released: 2009

Day One is the first studio album from Snob Scrilla, released on the 24 April 2009 in Australia, by the record label, Ivy League Records.

== Track listing ==
1. "Nuclear Sunrise" – 2:53
2. "Houston" – 4:05
3. "Timmy Declears War" – 0:44
4. "ALIENation" – 2:50
5. "Chasing Ghosts" – 4:03
6. "Heartbreak Scorsese" – 3:22
7. "There You Go Again" – 3:20
8. "King John" – 7:24
9. "Already Gone" – 3:44
10. "........" – 2:42
11. "THE3SECONDRULE" – 1:35
12. "It's On You" - 4:14
13. "Spaceship" - 4:14
14. "Hardest Times" - 6:30

== iTunes Track listing ==
1. "Nuclear Sunrise" – 2:53
2. "Houston" – 4:05
3. "Timmy Declears War" – 0:44
4. "ALIENation" – 2:50
5. "Chasing Ghosts" – 4:03
6. "Heartbreak Scorsese" – 3:22
7. "There You Go Again" – 3:20
8. "King John" – 7:24
9. "Already Gone" – 3:44
10. "........" – 2:42
11. "THE3SECONDRULE" – 1:35
12. "It's On You" - 4:14
13. "Spaceship" - 4:14
14. "Hardest Times" - 6:30
15. "**Gasoline Dreams**" - 3:57
16. "**Criminal**" - 3:40

Tracks in bold are bonus tracks exclusive to iTunes

== Charts ==
Chart (2009)	Peak position
ARIA Australian Urban Charts	22
