= Braveheart (song) =

2014 single by Neon Jungle

Single by Neon Jungle

from the album Welcome to the Jungle
- Released: 17 January 2014
- Recorded: 2013
- Genre: EDM; dance-pop
- Length: 3:44
- Label: RCA
- Songwriters: Cassie Davis; Sean Ray
- Producers: Baby; Snob Scrilla

Neon Jungle singles chronology
"Trouble" (2013)	"Braveheart" (2014)	"Welcome to the Jungle" (2014)

"Braveheart" is a song recorded by British girl group Neon Jungle for their debut studio album, Welcome to the Jungle (2014). It was released by RCA Records as the album's second single on 17 January 2014. The track was written and produced by American rapper Snob Scrilla, with additional songwriting by Cassie Davis and additional production by Baby. "Braveheart" conceptualized accidentally when the group found its demo version on the song producers' laptop and insisted that they record the song. It is an uptempo EDM dance-pop song which comprises "euphoric" instrumentation, a "hammering" bass line, "hands-in-the-air" synths and "pulsing" beats. "Braveheart" contains uplifting lyrical themes and ideals of experiences in a night club.

The song was met with generally favourable reviews from contemporary music critics who praised its production as well as the group's vocal performance. Some honed "Braveheart" as the best single released by a girl group in 2014, while others were divided in opinion over the song's rap section. The song is Neon Jungle's most successful single to-date. It bowed at number four on the UK Singles Chart and was certified silver by the British Phonographic Industry (BPI) for sales of 200,000 units. "Braveheart" peaked at number two in Scotland, and also became the group's first charting single in Ireland and Australia where it peaked within the top 20 in both countries.

An accompanying music video, directed by Emil Nava, was released on 11 December 2013. It depicts the group as "in touch with their spirit animals," in several illumuniously-coloured settings, and its imagery and styling was lauded by music critics. Neon Jungle have performed "Braveheart" at the 2014 Manchester Pride.

== Background ==
"It's almost like there's three songs in one. There's a lot of different layers to it. It's very high-energy, there's a heavy beat and bass line. You hear it and immediately you just get up and move. A lot of people say it's their favourite song to listen to in the gym because it just really pushes them to go for it. While 'Trouble' is a little more pre-club, getting ready, getting yourself packed up sort of thing, 'Braveheart' is maybe for a slightly older audience. It's a little more clubby."
—Jessica Plummer

"Braveheart" was written and produced by Snob Scrilla, with additional songwriting by Cassie Davis and additional production by Baby. It was mixed by James F. Reynolds and mastered by Dick Beetham. Scrilla and Davis were responsible for the track's keyboard instrumentation and synthesizer melody. "Braveheart" conceptualized "as an accident" when Neon Jungle were in the studio and "raided" their producer's laptop and found the song's beat; group member Jessica Plummer stated, "from that very second we all believed in the track". In addition, the quartet liked what the producers had written and said "No, stop! What was that? Play that again!" At the time, Neon Jungle were to depart to Los Angeles the next day and it was the last time the group had left to record with their producers. On the day, at 01:00, the group insisted on recording the song and did so through the early hours of the morning. In an interview with VanityHype Magazine, Neon Jungle mentioned, "While we were doing it we were vibing off it and we had our own words and stuff, so it was just like a vibey night, ha ha!"

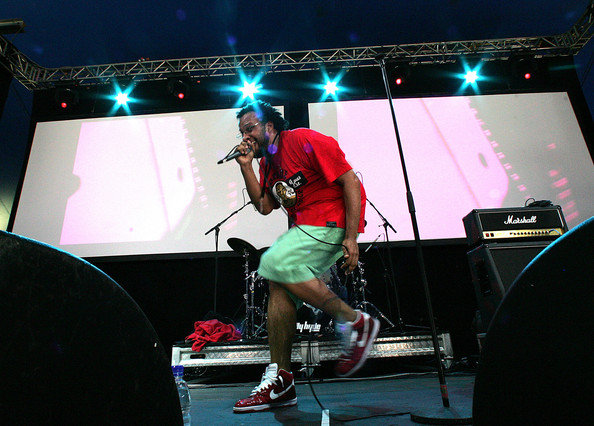
Snob Scrilla co-wrote and co-produced "Braveheart".

"Welcome to the Jungle" was initially planned to be released as the group's second single but was put on-hold in favour of "Braveheart". Speaking to Beverley Lyons of the Daily Record, group member Shereen Cutkelvin mentioned, "We didn't even know the title at first so that wasn't the reason we went for it. As soon as we heard the beat, we just knew it was the one." She also stated that if the group never "randomly found" the song, it would have never been recorded and deemed it her favourite song on their debut album, Welcome to the Jungle (2014). Cutkelvin went on to tell Lyons, "It felt even more awesome when I found out the name. The beat was killer, it was calling us so we released it as our second single instead [of 'Welcome to the Jungle']". On 11 November 2013, Neon Jungle posted a 30-second snippet of the song and announced that it will be released as the group's second single on 19 January 2014. The song premiered on radio in the United Kingdom on 2 December 2013. "Braveheart" was released on 17 January 2014 as a digital download. On 24 January 2014 a digital remixes single was released which featured remixes by Patrick Hagenaar and East Freaks. Speaking of the track, group member Asami Zdrenka mentioned, "The magic belief fairy dust was sprinkled over that song from the first time we heard it". In addition, the group have said that they "experience a lot of different emotions performing and listening to the song," and described "Braveheart" as "having it loud, pumping through speakers," adding "it's just like a rave every time it plays".

== Composition ==
"Braveheart" is an uptempo EDM dance-pop song, which runs for a duration of three minutes and 44 seconds (3:44). It draws influence from house music, and combines guttural low end bass throbs with arching falsettos. The track's "euphoric" instrumentation consists of a "hammering" bass line, "hands-in-the-air" synths and "pulsing" beats. Sonically, Neon Jungle solicit "Braveheart" with "bad-ass" attitude and "in-your-face" personality. It comprises elements of 90s throwback electro dance amidst an aggressive backbeat. AndPop's Rebecca Mattina quipped, "Without a doubt this song belongs in a nightclub, obviously one with lots of flashing lights and loud speakers." According to Michael Cragg of The Guardian, the song "refined the sound of 'Trouble' into a more club friendly, but no less characterful, mix of pulsing synths and huge bass drops". While Jon O'Brien of Yahoo! Celebrity felt that "Braveheart" sees Neon Jungle "sticking to the same brash EDM-pop sound" of "Trouble". Renowned for Sound's Stephanie Ochona opined that the song was "more modern" in tone in comparison with other girl band singles.

"The reason we've used cheese in the song, like, twice is because on the street 'cheese' means money. And we talk about lettuce because it's fresh. The lyric is: 'We talkin' bout fresh / Talkin' bout lettuce'. No one has salad in their songs except Neon Jungle. What other band has salad in their songs?"

— Group member Amira McCarthy speaking to Nick Levine of Attitude about the song.

It features a rapped section that has been described as "oddly cheese obsessed", "Talking about fresh, we're talking about lettuce, all those things the lifestyle get us, steak and cheddar, chopping feta". The section's songwriter, Scrilla, felt that comprising American slang would make the track "fun". In the song, Zdrenka makes use of a Japanese count off, "Ichi, ni, san, kaesu!" It was included due to Zdrenka being half-Japanese and as a climax before the song's drop. Lyrically, "Braveheart" "feel-good," and comprises uplifting themes that have been likened to American actor Mel Gibson's freedom speech from the 1995 film of the same name. Neon Jungle have stated that the track is about "letting go and having a good time". The group consider the song to contrast with "Trouble" which they described as a "getting ready to go out" song, while they felt "Braveheart" was a song "you'll hear in the middle of a club, where all the dancefloor comes together." Musically, "Braveheart" has been likened to the works of Barbadian recording artist Rihanna and French disc jockey David Guetta. While Thomas H Green of The Arts Desk felt the song's production was reminiscent to that of "Selfie" by American duo The Chainsmokers.

== Critical reception ==
"Braveheart" received generally favourable reviews from contemporary music critics, who were however divided in opinion on its rap section. Scottish newspaper the Daily Record awarded the song a four (out of five)-star rating and quipped, "Little Mix sound like old ladies compared to this". Idolator's Sam Lansky deemed the track "one of the most blisteringly cool dance-pop singles in a long while," and lauded it as "weird, dark, pummeling and thoroughly out-of-the-box." Lansky went on to deem "Braveheart" a "ravey radio smash in the making". Maxie Molotov-Smith of Fortitude Magazine honed the song as a "monstrous rave-ruckus" and commended the group's "in-your-face" attitude and "immoveable" confidence on the track. In addition, Molotov-Smith praised the song's "colossal and euphoric instrumental that invites any listener to lose themselves in the hammering bass line." Fuse's Jeff Benjamin deemed the song a "fiery, in-your-face banger". Stephanie Ochona of Renowned for Sound gave the song a four and a half (out of five)-star rating, and deemed it "a beast of a track". She praised the song's "infectious" beat, "catchy" chorus, and the group's "beautiful voices that fit in perfectly with each other". Furthermore, Ochona complimented the song's mix of singing and rapping, opining that it showcased the girl band's diversity. 4Music described the track as an "urban dance hit perfect for New Years Eve". Music website Sugarscape.com stated that they were "a little obsessed" with the song and deemed its rap section "ridiculously amazing". In a review of Welcome to the Jungle, Entertainmentwise's Nick Reilly commented: "We're grabbed from the moment that the song opens by the club sound that leads the track. This, paired with a fantastically tenacious chorus and an unexpected diversion into rap sets the bar pretty damn high for the rest of the album!" Rory Cashin of Entertainment.ie described "Braveheart" as "the perfect follow-up" to "Trouble" and "a sexy little number you won't be able stop your body from reacting to". AndPop's Rebecca Mattina commended the track's immediate bassline, "sultry" vocals and McCarthy's "sassy" rap solo, and felt that "Braveheart" was "perfect" for electropop fans who need a "heart-thumping jam". Gay Times journalist Lee Dalloway said the track was "certainly worthy of a good rinsing on the club circuit", and commended its "well-crafted" pitch and "on the floor" credential.

Writing for The Guardian, Michael Cragg commended the production and Neon Jungle's character on the song, and quipped, "Following an odd year for girl bands in 2013, Neon Jungle might just be able to make things right again in 2014". Cragg, however, opined that the girl band "might need to work on their rapping skills". "Braveheart" was awarded a three (out of five)-star rating by Digital Spy's Robert Copsey, who felt the song was "a menacing club banger" and "tailored for radio," and praised the each girl band member for vocally "coming into their own". Like Cragg, Copsey was however also critical of the group's rapping ability, writing, "And while we can forgive the slight lack of originality, the dodgy rap breakdown on which they rhyme 'stacking cheddar' with 'chopping feta' we just cannot." Charly Barnes of The Galleon awarded "Braveheart" a six (out of ten)-star rating and commended the quartet's "strong vocals" on the song, but deemed the track "marmite" and felt the group should "lay off attempted rapping". Jon O'Brien from Yahoo! Celebrity felt that the track was "undeniably addictive" and that it continued to establish Neon Jungle as "the world's most in-yer-face girlband". O'Brien, however, called the rap "slightly dodgy" and stated "there's little here to distinguish the track from the wave of Guetta-esque club bangers that have swamped the charts this decade." Ian Gittins of Virgin Media highlighted the song as Neon Jungle's best and as "killer Kelis-style rave-pop", but felt it was "spoilt by shrill". On 2 August 2014, Vada Magazine's Mark Rocks lauded "Braveheart" as "still the most exciting thing released by a girl group in 2014," opining that it was "effortlessly refreshing" but dismissed the song's rap as "questionable".

== Chart performance ==
"Braveheart" became a commercial success for Neon Jungle and is to-date their most successful single in all the territories in which it charted. Upon its chart breakthrough, Vada Magazine writer Mark Rocks commented that Neon Jungle "looked set to live up to the hype they were receiving". "Braveheart" became Neon Jungle's first top ten single in the United Kingdom. It debuted at number four on the UK Singles Chart issued for 1 February 2014, selling a total of 63,743 copies in its first week. It went on to spend a further two weeks in the top ten - dropping to number seven in its second week with a sales tally of 36,059, while in its third week it sold 25,072 copies at number nine. "Braveheart" accumulated nine weeks within the chart's top 75. On 4 July 2014, the song was certified silver by the British Phonographic Industry (BPI) for sales in excess of 200,000 units. In Scotland, "Braveheart" debuted at number two behind Clean Bandit's "Rather Be" (featuring Jess Glynne). On 23 January 2014, it became Neon Jungle's first single to chart in Ireland when it entered the Irish Singles Chart at number 25. The song went on to peak at number 20 two weeks later. In Australia, Neon Jungle made their chart debut when "Braveheart" bowed at number 80 on 18 February 2014. The song achieved a peak of number 19 where it stayed for two non-consecutive weeks. It was later certified gold by the Australian Recording Industry Association (ARIA) for selling 35,000 copies digital copies. "Braveheart" marked Neon Jungle's first chart appearance in mainland Europe when it reached number 60 on the Ultratip Singles Chart in Belgium (Flanders).

== Music video ==
"Braveheart" was accompanied by a music video directed by Emil Nava. The clip premiered online on 11 December 2013. The music video sees Neon Jungle featured in darkened, red-and-green-hued spaces, performing "defiantly" while being lit up by the illuminous colours. It depicts the group as "in touch with their spirit animals". Imagery of lions, wolves, owls and doves also appear in the visual for "Braveheart".

Writing for music website, Idolator, Sam Lansky felt the music video was "the perfect complement" for the song and that it manifested Neon Jungle as the "most intimidatingly fierce girl group around". Television channel 4Music echoed Lansky's view, also deeming the visual "fierce" and felt it showcased the group staying true to their name. IX Daily's Anthony Deluca commented, "The video, like the track itself, is unapologetic, quick paced, and has the group showing off their unique sense of style." 96.3 Radio Aire stated that video was "amazing" and beautifully shot with "stunning" imagery. The music video was also positively reviewed by Sugarscape.com, and Gay Times journalist Lee Balloway who wrote, "[Neon Jungle] channel some crazy-girl Spice in the coinciding video as they romp their way around a simplistic set with a fistful of amphetamine-charged 'tude". MTV Buzzworthy's John Walker opined, "While most of the music video serves as in-motion glamour shots of the girls, the severe neon red and turquoise lights give the clip an edge, keeping the whole affair from being too straightforwardly pretty-pretty." The music video for "Braveheart" has attained over 11 million combined YouTube views.

== Live performances ==
Neon Jungle performed "Braveheart" at the 2014 Manchester Pride. Dianne Bourne of the Manchester Evening News opined, "it was full, arms aloft joy when they crowned their short set with 'Braveheart,' which is becoming something of a modern disco-land classic."

== Formats and track listings ==
- Digital download
1. "Braveheart" – 3:44
- Digital remixes single
1. "Braveheart" (Patrick Hagenaar's Colour Code Remix) – 5:15
2. "Braveheart" (East Freaks Remix) – 4:58

== Credits and personnel ==
- Neon Jungle – vocals
- Cassie Davis – songwriter, keyboard instrument, synthesizer
- Snob Scrilla – songwriter, producer, keyboard instrument, synthesizer
- Baby – producer
- James F. Reynolds – mixing
- Dick Beetham – mastering

Credits adapted from the liner notes of Welcome to the Jungle.

== Charts and certifications ==
=== Weekly charts ===
Weekly chart performance for "Braveheart"
Chart (2014)	Peak position
Australia (ARIA)	19
Belgium (Ultratip Bubbling Under Flanders)	60
Belgium Dance (Ultratip Wallonia)	4
Ireland (IRMA)	20
Scottish Singles Sales (Official Charts)	2
UK Dance (Official Charts)	2
UK Singles (Official Charts)	4

=== Year-end charts ===
2014 year-end chart performance for "Braveheart"
Chart (2014)	Peak position
UK Singles (Official Charts Company)	97

=== Certifications ===
Certifications for "Braveheart"
Region	Certification	Certified units/sales
Australia (ARIA)	Gold	35,000^{^}
United Kingdom (BPI)	Silver	200,000^{‡}
^{^} Shipments figures based on certification alone.^{‡} Sales+streaming figures based on certification alone.

== Release history ==
Country	Date	Format	Label
Australia	17 January 2014	Digital download	RCA Records
Belgium	17 January 2014	Digital download	RCA Records
Ireland	17 January 2014	Digital download	RCA Records
United Kingdom	17 January 2014	Digital download	RCA Records
Australia	24 January 2014	Digital remixes single	RCA Records
Belgium	24 January 2014	Digital remixes single	RCA Records
Ireland	24 January 2014	Digital remixes single	RCA Records
United Kingdom	24 January 2014	Digital remixes single	RCA Records
United States	24 January 2014	Digital remixes single	RCA Records

== See also ==
- List of UK top 10 singles in 2014
