= Adam B =

Northern Irish YouTuber (born 1999)

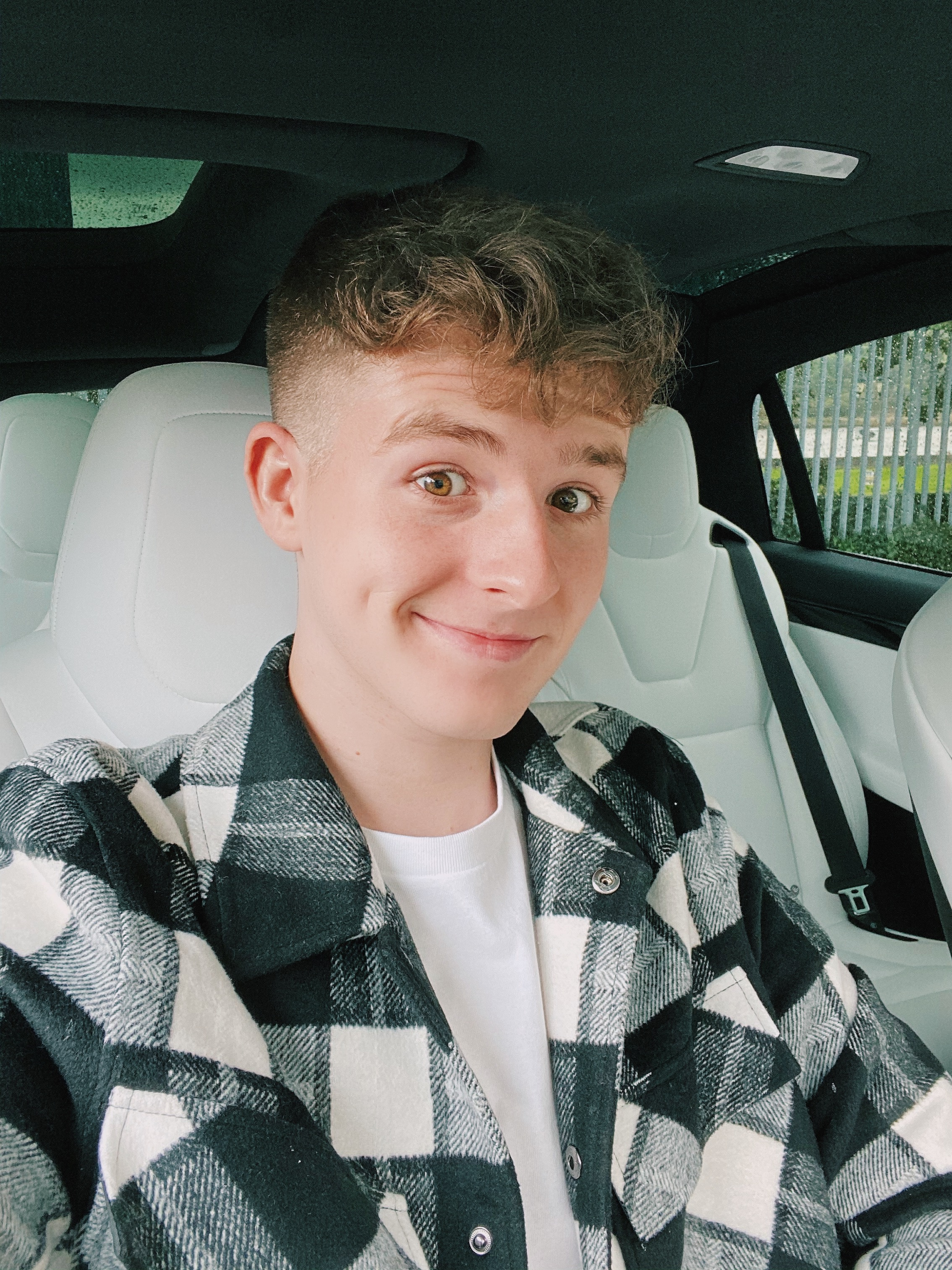
- Beales in 2019
- Born: Adam Beales; 11 October 1999 (age 27); Derry, Northern Ireland
- Occupations: YouTuber; actor; television host; author

YouTube information
- Channel: Adam B
- Years active: 2012-present
- Genres: Pranks; challenges; vlogs; life hacks; gaming; DIY
- Subscribers: 5.53 million
- Views: 2 billion
- Last updated: 14th July 2026

Adam Beales (born 11 October 1999), known as Adam B, is a YouTuber, actor, and television host from Derry, Northern Ireland. He is a former co-presenter of the CBBC shows The Dog Ate My Homework and Blue Peter. Beales has over 4 million subscribers on YouTube and has collaborated with Disney.

== Early life ==
Beales was born on 11 October 1999 in Derry, Northern Ireland. He completed his schooling at St Columb's College, where he was Head Boy.

== Career ==
At the age of 12, he started his channel Adam B (which was then called “TheNewAdamb99”) on 29 July 2012. He started by filming all of his videos and editing them from his bedroom in his parents' house.

In 2017, he made a partnership with Disney. In 2019, his YouTube channel reached over 2.7 million subscribers with a total of 300 million views.

He has appeared on BBC Radio, The Ryan Tubridy Show and was featured on VidCon London's first conference. In June 2019, he won the Youth 19 Champions Award. From 2019 to 2020, he was the co-presenter in the seventh series of the CBBC show The Dog Ate My Homework.

On 1 September 2020, Beales was announced as the 40th Blue Peter presenter and would make his debut two days later. He left Blue Peter in 2022, with his final appearance on 15 July.

In 2022 Beales co-hosted Bro's in Control for the BBC, along with Joe Tasker and his brother Callum B. A second series with Beales and Tasker was commissioned in September 2023.

Beale has published two books, Adam Wins The Internet and Adam Destroys The Internet.

== Personal life ==
Beales is gay. He came out in a video he uploaded on his YouTube channel titled "I'M GAY..." on 22 July 2022. In the next video, titled "MEET MY BOYFRIEND", he showed the audience his partner Dominic.

He works with his mother Edelle and father Paul as video partners. Beales' younger brother Callum also has his own YouTube channel, Callum B. The family collectively share a YouTube channel, Family 4.
