= Bro's in Control =

- Genre: Comedy; Game Show
- Created by: Oli Whybra (Format)
- Directed by: Fergus Thom (Series 2)
- Presented by: Callum Beales
- Starring: Adam Beales; Joe Tasker; Callum Beales
- Country of origin: United Kingdom
- Original language: English
- No. of series: 5
- No. of episodes: 65

Production
- Executive producers: Yvonne Jennings; Fiona Piper
- Production location: BBC Studios
- Camera setup: Multi-camera
- Running time: 15 minutes
- Production companies: Studio 71 UK; BBC Studios Kids & Family Productions

Original release
- Network: CBBC BBC iPlayer
- Release: 26 September 2022 – present

Bro's in Control is a British television series produced by the BBC. The first series launched in 2022. It features Joe Tasker and Adam Beales as contestants who have to complete random tasks set by Adam’s younger brother Callum Beales.

A second series was commissioned in September 2023.

Each episode sees Adam and Joe go head to head in two challenges set by Callum, who must decide who completed each challenge the best, with tie breakers if necessary. The winner earns bragging rights, whereas the loser must face a randomly selected punishment from Callum's "Wheel of Doom."

== Transmissions ==
| Series | Start date | End date | Episodes |
|---|---|---|---|
| 1 | 26 September 2022 | 21 October 2022 | 15 |
| 2 | 6 November 2023 | 29 November 2023 | 15 |
| 3 | 31 October 2024 | 28 November 2024 | 15 |
| 4 | 17 November 2025 | 4 December 2025 | 14 |
| 5 | 30 October 2026 | 4 December 2026 | 15 |
