= Louder (Neon Jungle song) =

2014 single by Neon Jungle

Single by Neon Jungle

from the album Welcome to the Jungle
- Released: 20 July 2014
- Recorded: 2014
- Genre: Pop
- Label: Sony, RCA
- Songwriter(s): Duck Blackwell, Adam Argyle, Jetta John-Hartley

Neon Jungle singles chronology
"Welcome to the Jungle" (2014)	"Louder" (2014)	"Can't Stop the Love" (2014)

"Louder" is a 2014 song by Neon Jungle from their 2014 album Welcome to the Jungle. It is their fourth single.

== Background ==
The band said the song discussed feelings and emotions and not being able to control the way someone feels towards another, and wanting to increase the volume of everything else around one to block it out.

The song is different from the group's previous singles in that it is slower and not a dance track. Releasing such a track had always been Neon Jungle's intention, to surprise people. This song has gained comparisons to The Saturdays' "Lies" from their debut album Chasing Lights.

== Music video ==
A music video was produced for the song which featured the group performing intensely in a massive metal dome structure. It was directed by Colin Tilley.

== Critical reception ==
The song has received general acclaim from music critics. Meggie Morris of Renowned for Sound praised the song, stating that

this less processed release enables us to recognise the talent behind such young voices, and appreciate why their individual tones work so well together ... "Louder" nevertheless retains the edginess and energy we've come to expect from the four-piece pop mega-outfit ... whilst expanding their range to captivate additional devotees.

Morris ultimately gave the song 4 out of 5 stars. Sugarscape.com called it "well snazzy". Mistreemagazine.co.uk noted that the song "has been defined as a raw number which sees the band strip themselves of their pop hooks and dance beats" whilst commending it for being "emotionally raw" and "not without a pop hook or a contagious beat that keeps you hitting replay", concluding that it was "a pop-fuelled track and it's bloody brilliant. Electronically fuelled, the combination of diverse vocals, hard-hitting percussion and the addictive melody during the chorus will make you turn the volume up louder."

== Chart performance ==
Chart (2014)	Peak position
Scotland (OCC)	6
UK Singles (OCC)	14
