= The Girl Before =

4-part television thriller adaptation

- Genre: Psychological thriller
- Created by: J.P. Delaney
- Based on: The Girl Before by J.P. Delaney
- Written by: J.P. Delaney (parts 1-4); Marissa Lestrade (parts 2 & 3)
- Directed by: Lisa Brühlmann
- Starring: Gugu Mbatha-Raw; David Oyelowo; Jessica Plummer; Ben Hardy
- No. of episodes: 4

Production
- Executive producers: J.P. Delaney; Eleanor Moran; Rory Aitken; Ben Pugh; Ben Irving; Lisa Brühlmann
- Producer: Rhonda Smith
- Production location: Bristol
- Production companies: BBC Studios; 42

Original release
- Network: BBC One; HBO Max
- Release: 19 December – 22 December 2021

The Girl Before is a British four-part thriller television series created by J.P. Delaney for BBC One and HBO Max, based on the 2016 novel of the same name by Delaney.

== Premise ==
A traumatised woman falls in love with an extraordinary minimalist house, which remains under the spell of the architect who originally designed it, but not everything may be as it seems.

== Cast ==
- Gugu Mbatha-Raw as Jane Cavendish, a single woman who moves into the minimalist house Edward built, three years after Emma and Simon.
- David Oyelowo as Edward, the architect of the minimalist house with many rules.
- Jessica Plummer as Emma Matthews, partner of Simon. They move into the minimalist house that Edward designed three years prior to Jane and is revealed to have died in the minimalist house
- Ben Hardy as Simon, partner of Emma, who reluctantly moves into the minimalist house designed by Edward.

=== Recurring ===
- Ian Conningham as DI James Clarke
- Amanda Drew as Carol
- Mark Stanley as Saul
- Rakhee Thakrar as Mia
- Ben Addis as Peter Creed
- Natasha Atherton as Leona

== Episodes ==
No.	Title	Directed by	Written by	Original release date
1	"Episode 1"	Lisa Brühlmann	J.P. Delaney	19 December 2021
A couple, Simon and Emma, view a unique, minimalist house, as does a young woman, Jane. The rent is cheap, but the catch is there are many restrictions, few possessions, no children, etc. Both are offered the house. Jane discovers that three years earlier Emma died at the house. The architect’s wife and child also died during the construction of a previous design of the house.
2	"Episode 2"	Lisa Brühlmann	J.P. Delaney & Marissa Lestrade	20 December 2021
Edward’s relationships with Emma and Jane follow a similar pattern; he invites himself round to cook dinner then it becomes physical. Emma is upset when the man who raped her pleads not guilty. Jane finds a business card for Emma’s therapist and visits her.
3	"Episode 3"	Lisa Brühlmann	J.P. Delaney & Marissa Lestrade	21 December 2021
Jane thinks she is pregnant. The police discover that Emma wasn't raped by the burglar and charge her with perjury. Simon thinks Emma was murdered. Jane begins to wonder if Edward was involved.
4	"Episode 4"	Lisa Brühlmann	J.P. Delaney	22 December 2021
Emma tells Simon she was raped by a colleague. They argue, he pushes her and she falls downstairs. Jane confronts Edward about "secret" cameras in the house. Simon comes to see her and she realises what happened to Emma.

== Production ==
Ron Howard was initially linked to the project. Killing Eve director Lisa Brühlmann directed. J.P. Delaney created, wrote and executive-produced the series. He also co-wrote two episodes with screenwriter Marissa Lestrade. Filming began in Bristol in the spring of 2021 on location in Redland, Bristol and at The Bottle Yard Studios. ITV Studios is the international distributor for the series.

== Broadcast ==
The Girl Before is broadcast on BBC One in the UK and streaming on the BBC iPlayer and streaming in the United States on HBO Max. The Girl Before premieres in Australia from Thursday 10 February 2022 on Foxtel and Binge.

== Reception ==
On review aggregator website Rotten Tomatoes, the series holds a 50% approval rating based on 14 reviews, with an average rating of 5.6/10. The website's critics consensus reads, "Despite stellar performances from Gugu Mbatha-Raw and Jessica Plummer, The Girl Before fizzles as a mystery." On Metacritic, the series has a score of 56 out of 100, based on 14 reviews, indicating "mixed or average reviews".

Leila Latif of The A.V. Club gave the limited series a B and said, "...the series still proves more artful than most entries in the genre. [However], many of its larger plot points and mysteries are predictably resolved (made more predictable still by a small cast that provides a limited number of solutions), but the series shines best when it takes a step back from the twists and turns and settles into character study."
