= The After (film) =

2023 British short film

- Official poster
- Directed by: Misan Harriman
- Screenplay by: John Julius Schwabach
- Story by: Misan Harriman
- Produced by: Nicky Bentham; David Oyelowo
- Starring: David Oyelowo; Jessica Plummer
- Cinematography: Si Bell
- Edited by: Aggela Despotidou
- Music by: Francesco Le Metre
- Production companies: Neon Films; Yoruba Saxon Productions
- Distributed by: Netflix
- Release dates: 10 August 2023 (HollyShorts Film Festival); 25 October 2023 (Netflix)
- Running time: 18 minutes
- Country: United Kingdom
- Language: English

The After is a 2023 British short film directed by Misan Harriman in his directorial debut and written by John Julius Schwabach from a story by Harriman. The film starring David Oyelowo and Jessica Plummer, tells the story of Dayo, a grieving rideshare driver who, after losing family members to a violent crime, picks up a passenger who helps him confront the past.

The After, winner of Best Live Action Short Film Award at HollyShorts Film Festival, was nominated for the Best Live Action Short Film at the 96th Academy Awards in January 2024.

== Plot ==
Dayo, an executive in London, accompanies his young daughter Laura as they head to meet her mother. As he steps aside to take a call, a stabbing attack takes place and his daughter gets killed. Though he manages to restrain the attacker, his wife commits suicide.

A timeskip shows that Dayo is now a ride-share driver who does not keep in touch with friends or even social workers. He is shown stoically driving various passengers around, with intermissions of his grieving, such as singing "Happy Birthday" to a photograph of his family.

At the airport, Dayo picks up a bickering couple and their daughter, who bears a resemblance to his own daughter. As he steps out of the car to carry their baggage, he receives a hug from the daughter. In response to this, Dayo has a breakdown on the curb and is seen crying as he sits there.

== Cast ==
- David Oyelowo as Dayo
- Jessica Plummer as Amanda
- Sule Rimi as Stewart
- Izuka Hoyle as Emily
- Amelie Dokubo as Laura
- Ellen Francis as Rebecca
- Nikesh Patel as Salman
- Tara-Binta Collins as Amy
- Dominique Tipper as Jessica
- Ravi Singh as Krish
- Ruth Sheen as Tabatha
- Alan Williams as Fry
- Dan Griffiths as Bandana Man

== Production ==
Misan Harriman wrote a story, based on his own idea, which was turned into screenplay by John Julius Schwabach. David Oyelowo joined the cast and production team after viewing some of Harriman's photographs during the Black Lives Matter movement. Nicky Bentham also joined as producer after meeting Harriman.

== Release ==
The film premiered at the opening night of the HollyShorts Film Festival on August 10, 2023.

The film was screened at 2023 BFI London Film Festival in 'LFF for Free: Shorts' section under 'Big Little Lives' on October 5, 2023.

Netflix made the film available from October 25, 2023.

== Original soundtrack ==
The After

Soundtrack album by Francesco Le Metre
- Released: October 27, 2023
- Recorded: 2023
- Genre: Soundtrack
- Length: 8:38
- Language: English
- Label: Netflix Music
Audio Full Album
- The After (Original Score)

There are 6 tracks in the album:
No.	Title	Artist	Length
1.	"Day Out"	Francesco Le Metre	1:09
2.	"No More Family"	Francesco Le Metre	1:45
3.	"The After"	Francesco Le Metre	1:44
4.	"Journeys"	Francesco Le Metre	0:57
5.	"Flashbacks"	Francesco Le Metre	1:29
6.	"Breakdown"	Francesco Le Metre	1:34
Total length:			8:38

== Reception ==
Jason Knight rated the film 4/5 and praised technical aspects writing, "there are some fantastic establishing shots" and "filmmakers are creative with the sound, during scenes where voices sink in the background." Knight also liked the music and said, "Regarding the soundtrack, Francesco Le Metre develops music that includes sentimental piano melodies." Concluding he wrote, "It is an emotional and hard-hitting drama with superb acting and great character development and it explores psychological deterioration due to the effects of loss and grief."

Riya Singh reviewing for Leisurebyte wrote, "The After is a beautiful yet melancholic story of a man who once had everything and now remains in a world that is making him live on." Concluding she opined, "This is a story that will make you live through a full-length movie in just 18 minutes."

Rupali Manohar Chauhan reviewing for Meaww wrote, "John Julius Schwabach's hard-hitting and impactful writing deserves recognition. Schwabach has crafted a touching and profound screenplay, skillfully pulling the heartstrings of the audience."

== Accolades ==
Award	Date of ceremony	Category	Recipient(s)	Result	Ref.
HollyShorts Film Festival	August 20, 2023	Best Live Action Short Film	The After	Won	
Astra Film Awards	January 6, 2024	Best Short Film	The After	Won	
African American Film Critics Awards	January 15, 2024	Best Short Film	The After	Won	
Academy Awards	March 10, 2024	Best Live Action Short Film	The After	Nominated	
NAACP Image Awards	March 16, 2024	Outstanding Short Form (Live Action)	The After	Won	

== See also ==
- Academy Award for Best Live Action Short Film
- 96th Academy Awards
