= First Mind =

Studio album by Nick Mulvey
- Released: 12 May 2014
- Recorded: 2013 at (Mr Dan's in London, England)
- Genre: Folk, folk rock
- Length: 48:01
- Label: Fiction Records
- Producer: Dan Carey

Singles from First Mind
- 1. "Nitrous" Released: 25 October 2013; 2. "Cucurucu" Released: 28 February 2014

First Mind is the debut album by British singer-songwriter Nick Mulvey, and was released on 12 May 2014.

== Promotion ==
In June 2013 Mulvey embarked on a 16-date tour, supporting Laura Marling on eight dates of her UK tour, and playing festivals including Glastonbury and Latitude. In December of that year Mulvey was nominated for the BBC Sound of 2014 award, eventually losing to fellow countryman Sam Smith. On 10 September 2014 First Mind was shortlisted for the 2014 Mercury Prize, alongside artists such as Damon Albarn, Bombay Bicycle Club and Kae Tempest.

== Critical reception ==
Professional ratings
Aggregate scores
Source	Rating
Metacritic	77/100
Review scores
Source	Rating
Allmusic	3.5/5 stars
Clash	8/10
The Guardian	4/5 stars
The Line of Best Fit	7.5/10
Mojo	6/10
musicOMH	8/10
Q	8/10
The Telegraph	5/5 stars

According to review aggregator website Metacritic, First Mind received an average score of 77 out of 100 based on 9 reviews, indicating generally favorable reviews.

The Telegraph awarded the album five stars, with reviewer Helen Brown calling the album "a lovely, and rewarding record." Clash were similarly positive, complimenting the album for being "full of intricacies and influences that should see it celebrated as one of the great albums of 2014." Q commended Mulvey on his debut work outside of Portico Quartet, confirming that he "is very much his own man on this highly intriguing debut." Popular blog The Line of Best Fit complimented the album on being "a total package of pop hooks, instrumental genius and gorgeous rhythms", calling Mulvey "an extremely talented musician".

== Track listing ==
All tracks are written by Nick Mulvey.

No.	Title	Length
1.	"First Mind"	3:05
2.	"Fever To The Form"	4:12
3.	"April"	4:08
4.	"Juramidam"	5:16
5.	"Cucurucu"	4:27
6.	"Ailsa Craig"	4:57
7.	"Meet Me There"	3:26
8.	"Nitrous"	3:12
9.	"Venus"	5:25
10.	"I Don't Want To Go Home"	3:29
11.	"The Trellis"	5:33
12.	"The World To Me"	2:44

== Personnel ==
- Alexis Smith - Engineering, Mixing
- Dan Carey - Ukulele, Bass Guitar, Drum Machine, Electric Guitar, Prophet Synthesizer, Swarmatron Synthesizer, Mixing, Music Box
- Isadora Tanner - Backing Vocals
- Izzi Dunn - Cello
- John Dent - Mastering
- Liam Hutton - Drums
- Mike Pagulatos - Viola
- Nick Mulvey - Vocals, Guitar, Harmonium, Prophet Synthesizer, Percussion, Ukulele, Mellotron
- Shahzad Ismaily - Percussion, Synthesizer

== Chart performance ==
Chart (2013)	Peak position
UK Albums (OCC)	10

== Certifications ==
Region	Certification	Certified units/sales
United Kingdom (BPI)	Gold	100,000^{‡}
^{‡} Sales+streaming figures based on certification alone.
