= Welcome to the Jungle (Neon Jungle song) =

2014 single by Neon Jungle

Single by Neon Jungle

from the album Welcome to the Jungle
- Released: 18 April 2014
- Recorded: 2013
- Genre: EDM; electropop
- Length: 3:35
- Label: RCA
- Songwriters: Cassie Davis; Pierre-Antoine Melki; Raphaël Judrin; Sean Ray; Yoan Chirescu
- Producers: Baby; Snob Scrilla; SoFly and Nius

Neon Jungle singles chronology
"Braveheart" (2014)	"Welcome to the Jungle" (2014)	"Louder" (2014)

"Welcome to the Jungle" is a song recorded by British girl group Neon Jungle for their 2014 debut album of the same name. It was released by RCA Records as the album's third single on 18 April 2014. The track was written and produced by French duo SoFly and Nius and American rapper Snob Scrilla, with additional songwriting by Cassie Davis and Yoan Chirescu, and additional production by Baby. "Welcome to the Jungle" was one of the first songs recorded by Neon Jungle and served as the inspiration for their band name. It features a rap by group members Amira McCarthy and Jessica Plummer. It is an uptempo electronic dance music-electropop song with a "club-friendly" urban sound and "faint traces" of dancehall and reggae. Lyrically, the song concerns the subjects of partying, relationships with men, and having a good time. It is one of the official songs of the 2015 Copa América in Chile.

== Background ==
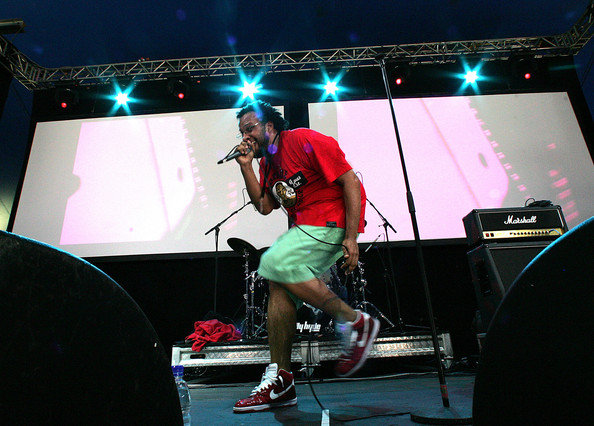
Snob Scrilla co-wrote and co-produced "Welcome to the Jungle".

"Welcome to the Jungle" was written and produced by SoFly and Nius and Snob Scrilla, with additional songwriting by Cassie Davis and Yoan Chirescu, and additional production by Baby. It was mixed by James F. Reynolds and mastered by Dick Beetham, while Chirescu was responsible for the track's guitar melody. It was one of the first tracks the group recorded in 2013; both the song and the group were nameless at the time. Upon hearing the demo version of the song, group member Amira McCarthy was shocked that the track was being pitched to Neon Jungle to record, feeling that it should have previously been a hit for a well-known American recording artist. McCarthy originally felt that it was difficult to improve upon the song's demo version, but once the quartet recorded the studio version, said "it is one of those songs that when you hear it you cannot help but get into it, totally". Thematically, the track was developed as one that would "welcome" Neon Jungle's fans to what the group were about. The song featured a rap that was initially intended as a guest slot, but producers were impressed with McCarthy and Jessica Plummer's vocal conviction during its recording and decided to scrap the planned guest slot altogether.

"We were given that song, gosh, so long ago when we didn't even have a name, and we sort of liked the way jungle sounded, but thought that we needed something before it because jungle wasn't strong enough on its own. And we thought of neon, not necessarily because we wear bright colours but we think that we've got quite bright personalities."

— Group member Asami Zdrenka speaking to Anthony Gilét of QX about the song

On 7 August 2013, the quartet revealed to the Daily Record that they had recorded a rap song entitled "Welcome to the Jungle" for their debut studio album. In an interview with Lewis Corner of Digital Spy on 30 August 2013, the group stated that the track represented them well, while depicting them as "individual" and "different". Originally, "Welcome to the Jungle" was planned to be Neon Jungle's second single, but it was later put on hold in favour of "Braveheart". In a press release on 20 February 2014, the group announced the track as their third single and described it as "a sexy, fun feel-good song with a more mature sound" that is "upbeat" and "shows another side to Neon Jungle." A 30-second snippet of the song was released on 24 February 2014. "Welcome to the Jungle" was premiered on radio in the United Kingdom on 10 March 2014, and made available to pre-order through iTunes with a release date of 20 April 2014. The song served as the third single and the title track from Neon Jungle's 2014 debut album. It was later released on 18 April 2014 as a digital download and digital EP, accompanied by a version of the song without the rap and remixes by Digital Dog, Sharoque, and Ted Fiction. With regard to the reason behind the song being chosen as the group's third single, Plummer explained in an interview with Kate Metcalfe of Lights Out Entertainment: "I think people may have been expecting us to take it down a notch with a ballad but you know what? The weather's getting warmer, let's keep everyone's spirits high! People loved 'Braveheart' and 'Trouble', let's give them more of what they want". In a separate interview, Zdrenka quipped, "We are still fierce but we want people to think they can talk to us at a party. Everyone says we aren't scary when they meet us."

== Composition ==
"Welcome to the Jungle" is an uptempo electronic dance music (EDM) and electropop song, with a duration of three minutes and thirty-five seconds. It has a "club-friendly" urban sound, and draws further influence from R&B, with "faint traces" of dancehall and reggae. Sonically, "Welcome to the Jungle" is upbeat and synth-laden, and features primarily Auto-Tuned harmonies, "hands-in-the-air atmospherics," euphoric breakdowns, and a dub-heavy beat. Lyrically, the song deals with subjects of partying, relationships with men, and having a good time. The track features a rap by McCarthy and Plummer near the end of the song.

"It's a bit more laid back than 'Braveheart' and 'Trouble,' but it's still got that energy, that [sings hook] 'Welcome to the jungle.' It's a bit more urban, it's just like everyone coming together and it's the track that says, 'Welcome to Neon Jungle. Welcome to us.'"

— Jessica Plummer

Rebecca Mattina of ANDPOP stated that "you know it's about to go down" when McCarthy and Shereen Cutkelvin begin to sing the lyric "Tonight I'll hunt you down, boy can you make me growl". Mattina opined that the "party really gets started once the ladies start chanting 'oh' before the first verse kicks in," and described the song sonically as "an eclectic mix of pop, EDM, and R&B." The lyric "the wild things on the prowl" was viewed by Entertainmentwise reviewer Nick Reilly as an "attempt to heat things up" sonically for the group. Vada Magazine's Mark Rocks felt "Welcome to the Jungle" was "engineered specifically to be that song you hear as you're getting off with a stranger in a club at 3 am", while also recognizing it for showing a "more vulnerable" side to the girl band. According to Jon O'Brien of Yahoo! Celebrity, the song pursued the chaotic dance-floor-friendly sound evident in Neon Jungle's previous singles "Trouble" and "Braveheart". O'Brien further described "Welcome to the Jungle" as "not exactly subtle" and opined that the track "neatly sums up what the girl band are about in three and a half dizzying minutes." Rory Cashin of Entertainment.ie noted that in comparison to Neon Jungle's previous two singles, the song "slowed things down significantly to show off the girls' not insignificant vocal authority during the verses, only for things to kick off all over again during the 'La la la la' verses." Renowned for Sound's Helena Ho felt that the song was reminiscent of the musical output of the American group Krewella and French disc jockey David Guetta. While Mike Wass of Idolator quipped, "'Welcome to the Jungle' is to Neon Jungle what 'Spice Up Your Life' was to the Spice Girls – an unofficial theme song that sums up what the group is all about."

== Reception ==
=== Critical ===
"Welcome to the Jungle" garnered mostly positive reviews from contemporary music critics. David Lim of So So Gay deemed the song a "speaker-detonating floor filler". Radio Aire called the track "epic" and "tantalizing", saying that "'Welcome to the Jungle' picks up where the girls left off with earth-shattering beats, insanely catchy vocals and hands-in-the-air atmospherics." ANDPOP's Rebecca Mattina felt that the track was one of the group's best, saying that it "perfectly captures the essence of Neon Jungle: sassy, strong, and fun." Metro Radio described "Welcome to the Jungle" as a "typically epic electro-pop powerhouse complete with euphoric breakdowns, an insanely catchy chorus and skilful rapping." Renowned for Sound's Helena Ho felt the song showcased Plummer and McCarthy's rapping talent, and commended the track for its "catchy" hooks and "energetic" tempo. Jeff Benjamin of Fuse described "Welcome to the Jungle" as a "fiery, in-your-face banger".

Writing for Yahoo! Celebrity, Jon O'Brien stated, "Despite little radio support, Neon Jungle have started to nip at the heels of The Saturdays and Little Mix for the title of Britain's best girl band". Idolator's Mike Wass echoed O'Brien's view, dubbing the quartet the "UK's hottest girl group" while noting McCarthy's "fiery" rap in the song as its highlight. Robert Copsey and Lewis Corner from Digital Spy positively reviewed the single, writing, "This is usually the point in a girl group's early career when they showcase their emotions with a piece of heart-tugging balladry, but don't go expecting that from Neon Jungle. Third single in and they're still rocking the club anthems with yet another four-to-the floor stomper." The song received a mixed review from Nick Reilly of Entertainmentwise, who felt he was "left a bit cold on an infectious, but instantly forgettable single." Virgin Media's Ian Gittins dismissed the song as "mediocre" and "Primark Rita Ora".

=== Commercial ===
"Welcome to the Jungle" became Neon Jungle's second consecutive top ten single in the United Kingdom. It debuted at number seven on the UK Singles Chart issued for 3 May 2014, selling a total of 29,804 copies in its first week. The song fell to number 15 in its second week and spent a total of four weeks within the chart's top 75. It was more successful in Scotland, where it entered at number four, dropping to number seven in its second week. Elsewhere, "Welcome to the Jungle" debuted at number 53 on the Irish Singles Chart before climbing the following week to its peak at number 46.

== Music video ==
Jessica Plummer in a scene from the video which critics described as a "neon-coloured free-for-all" reminiscent of the group's previous visual for "Braveheart".

"Welcome to the Jungle" was accompanied by a music video directed by Georgia Hudson, with photography directed by Adam Scarth and production handled by Amber Millington of Agile Films. There was no auditioning of models for the video; the extras featured were all friends of the quartet. The group spent three hours preparing before the video was shot, and 26 dancers were featured in the visual in total. On 10 March 2014, Zdrenka revealed in an interview with Jennifer Dunkerley of the Daily Star, "I think people found us a bit intimidating in our last video 'Braveheart,' so we came back with 'Welcome to the Jungle' so people would know what we are about. It's still fun but less fierce." While Plummer stated that the video is "basically saying, welcome to our world". The music video premiered on Neon Jungle's official Twitter account on 17 March 2014. In another interview, Plummer told Daisy Blacklock of the Somerset County Gazette that the video was "really different" from what the quartet had done before. Plummer later stated in an interview with the Daily Record that she and McCarthy stripped nude during the filming of the music video. Speaking to the Scottish newspaper, she said,

"There's a part in the video which has a rap section with me and Amira. We only had a short time to make it. We thought, 'We don't need to go back to the house to get changed' so we stripped off in the middle of the wood. There were a few fans sitting on the top of the hill but I don't think they saw us."

The video features the group at a rave, and dancing in a forest. Its locations include an abandoned warehouse and giant nightclub. Other visuals include fire, and like Neon Jungle's previous music video for "Braveheart", several neon lighting effects. Mike Wass from Idolator highlighted the video as a "neon-coloured free-for-all," while British radio station Kiss described it as "dimly-lit". The group are also backed by dancers in some scenes who engage in breakdancing. Daily Star journalist Jennifer Dunkerley described the video as "Crazy colours, big hair, flashing lights and a wild party like no other... Welcome To The Jungle".

The video for "Welcome to the Jungle" was met with positive reviews from music critics. Wass commended the group for serving "truckloads of sass" in the music video. Carl Smith of Sugarscape.com felt the clip was reminiscent of "scribbling with a laser pen" over the 1994 animated film The Lion King. In his review, Smith asked, "Ever thought The Jungle Book would have been that bit better if Baloo spent the entire time breakdancing? Well the dream's finally been realised in the form of Neon Jungle's [...] Welcome to the Jungle... just with four feisty girlband members instead of a massive bear."

== Live performances ==
Neon Jungle performed an acoustic version of the song live for City Talk 105.9 on 17 April 2014. The radio station commended the performance for showcasing the group's vocals "perfectly". On 19 April 2014, Neon Jungle performed "Welcome to the Jungle" at London nightclub G-A-Y. Anthony Gilét of QX opined that the group "looked – and sounded – amazing". On 22 June 2014, the group performed the song during the North East Live music festival at the Stadium of Light in Sunderland. The quartet did an exclusive stripped-down rendition of the track for 4Music, which the entertainment channel positively reviewed, saying that the performance showcased the group's talent and the "original energy" of the song. Neon Jungle later performed "Welcome to the Jungle" live at the 2014 Manchester Pride festival. Dianne Bourne of the Manchester Evening News reported that the rendition sent "gleeful jiggles" across the crowd. In July 2014, the group reprised the song at the All Access Eirias music festival in Colwyn Bay, North Wales. The North Wales Daily Post stated that Neon Jungle "belted out" the song with "plenty of heavy bass and gritty attitude."

== Formats and track listings ==
- Digital download
1. "Welcome to the Jungle" – 3:35
- Digital remixes EP
1. "Welcome to the Jungle" (No Rap) – 3:04
2. "Welcome to the Jungle" (Digital Dog Remix) – 2:59
3. "Welcome to the Jungle" (Sharoque Mash Up Remix) – 4:00
4. "Welcome to the Jungle" (Ted Fiction Remix) – 3:15

== Credits and personnel ==
- Neon Jungle – vocals
- Yoan Chirescu – songwriter, guitar
- Cassie Davis – songwriter
- SoFly and Nius – songwriter, producer
- Baby – producer
- Snob Scrilla – songwriter, producer
- James F. Reynolds – mixing
- Dick Beetham – mastering

Credits adapted from the liner notes of Welcome to the Jungle.

== Charts ==
Chart (2014)	Peak position
Ireland (IRMA)	46
Scottish Singles Sales (Official Charts)	4
UK Dance (Official Charts)	2
UK Singles (Official Charts)	7

== Release history ==
Country	Date	Format	Label
Australia	18 April 2014	Digital download	RCA Records
Belgium	18 April 2014	Digital download	RCA Records
Ireland	18 April 2014	Digital download	RCA Records
United Kingdom	18 April 2014	Digital download	RCA Records

== See also ==
- List of UK top 10 singles in 2014
