= Neon Jungle =

British girl group

- Origin: London, England
- Genres: R&B; pop; hip hop; EDM; grime; house; bashment
- Years active: 2013–2015
- Labels: Sony; RCA
- Past members: Jessica Plummer; Asami Zdrenka; Amira McCarthy; Shereen Cutkelvin

Neon Jungle were a British girl group consisting of Shereen Cutkelvin, Amira McCarthy, Jessica Plummer, and Asami Zdrenka. They were best known for their second single "Braveheart", which peaked at number four on the UK Singles Chart. Their 2014 debut and only album, Welcome to the Jungle, features "Braveheart" alongside fellow top 10 single "Welcome to the Jungle", as well as the top 20 entries "Trouble" and "Louder". The group separated in 2015.

== History ==
The group was formed by music manager David Cooper of Eye of the Storm, who began a three-month process of auditions in November 2012. Amira McCarthy and Jessica Plummer were initially scouted separately while shopping in London, while Shereen Cutkelvin and Asami Zdrenka were found via their solo YouTube videos. Cutkelvin, McCarthy, Plummer, and Zdrenka were told in February 2013 that they had made the line-up, and the same week the group began recording material in the studio. RCA Records UK signed the group by June 2013 and showcased them at a press event, although they did not have a name at the time. They chose the name Neon Jungle, which was derived from their song "Welcome to the Jungle" and to reflect that the members were "all individual and quite different". According to Plummer, "it’s like neon is bold, bright, strong individual characters and then the jungle part is the madness".

In August 2013, Neon Jungle released their debut single "Trouble", which entered the UK Singles Chart at number 12 and reached the top 10 on the US Billboard Dance/Electronic Digital Songs chart. During October, the group supported Jessie J on select dates of her Alive Tour, and the following month they performed alongside Taylor Swift at the annual Victoria's Secret Fashion Show in the US. Neon Jungle's second single, "Braveheart", was released in the UK in December 2013 and peaked at number four on the UK Singles Chart; the group had decided that the song's energy and major bass made it the best option for their second single. Neon Jungle released the song "Welcome to the Jungle" as their third single in April 2014; it debuted at number seven. The same month, they were signed to RCA Records in the United States.

Neon Jungle's debut album, Welcome to the Jungle, was released in July 2014 following the single "Louder" (number 14), and entered the UK Albums Chart at number eight. Welcome to the Jungle features songwriting and production contributions from Charli XCX, CocknBullKid, Cassie Davis, Fear of Tigers, Snob Scrilla, and soFLY & Nius. The group described the album as having "the same energy and attitude that came from Trouble" and "raw, stripped-back and versatile". The album includes a cover of Banks's "Waiting Game", which attracted publicity after Banks publicly acknowledged her dissatisfaction with the cover's release months prior to that of her own debut album, Goddess; Neon Jungle declined to respond to her comments. A fifth single, "Can't Stop the Love", was released in December 2014.

The group's contract with RCA Records was terminated in May 2015. Cutkelvin said the following month that the group were searching for a new label, writing new material and continuing to perform live. In July 2015, Neon Jungle announced via social media that they were disbanding. They were nominated at the 2015 Teen Choice Awards in the category of Choice Music: Next Big Thing.

== Artistry ==
Neon Jungle's sound was described by The Guardian as "pop-dance with a dash of punky" and "a cross between the chanty agit-pop of Icona Pop and the rumbling, EDM-tinged noise that fills the radio", and by The Independent as "edgy pop". Plummer said that the group were "not into a particular genre of music, we don’t want to be soul, we don’t want to be R&B or hip-hop, we want to be a new flavour".

Zdrenka commented on the diversity of their singing voices, characterising Cutkelvin's as "soulful", McCarthy's as "raspy" and having "that belt voice as well", Plummer's as having "a nice tone", and her own as "moody".

== Members ==
=== Shereen Cutkelvin ===
Born on 2 December 1996, is from Lanark, Scotland and is of Belizean and British descent. She is the youngest member of the band. Cutkelvin admits her shyness, but claims she's "been singing since she could walk and talk". She was inspired by her father, and considers him her "musical idol". Cutkelvin mentions she feels she was "born in the wrong generation", and mentions her love for Motown and soulful music with the likes of Diana Ross and The Temptations. Cutkelvin posted covers of herself on YouTube, along with videos with her family. She was later discovered and invited to audition, and mentions she got the call to confirm her place in the group on her way back to her home in Scotland. Cutkelvin also mentions working for Sony before joining the group.

In 2017, Cutkelvin appeared on series 14 of The X Factor, in a three-piece band with her two brothers, the Cutkelvins. The Cutkelvins made it to the second semi-finals. She has since gone on to become an actress and presenter for television and radio.

=== Amira McCarthy ===
Born 2 February 1996, in London, McCarthy stated that she has always known that performing was something she wanted to do. She has said that the moment she realised that the route she wanted to go down was music as opposed to acting or dancing was when she took part in a singing competition at her school, Westminster Academy. Similarly to Plummer, McCarthy was scouted to be in the group, found in a Westfields in west London. McCarthy later auditioned and made the final four. She is of African, Irish and Caribbean descent.

=== Jessica Plummer ===
Born in London on 16 September 1992, Plummer is the oldest member of the band and had previously worked as an actress. She appeared in two episodes of the CBBC series Wizards vs Aliens. Her musical idols include Mariah Carey, Beyoncé, Rihanna and Jessie J. Plummer was discovered through the group's manager in Brick Lane, London, and from there was invited to auditions. In 2019, she began appearing in the BBC soap opera EastEnders as Chantelle Atkins. In November 2020, Plummer was a contestant on the 20th series of I'm a Celebrity... Get Me Out of Here!, which was filmed in Wales due to travel restrictions during the COVID-19 pandemic.

=== Asami Zdrenka ===
Born 15 September 1995 in Japan, Zdrenka was born to Japanese and British parents, and moved to the UK at an early age along with her brother and sister, Ikuma and Airi. Zdrenka has said that she has always loved to sing, and as a child, when her father took her on holiday back to Japan, he would make her sing to her family. Zdrenka's mother Harumi was a singer and her grandfather has released albums in Japan. Zdrenka was also spotted online, through videos of herself singing on YouTube, catching the attention of the label. Following Neon Jungle's split, Zdrenka began working on solo material and released a video series entitled A Cover Trilogy.

== Discography ==
=== Studio albums ===
Title	Album details	Peak chart positions	
Title	Album details	UK	AUS
Welcome to the Jungle	Release date: 28 July 2014; Label: Sony Music, RCA; Format: Digital download, CD	8	48

=== Singles ===
Year	Title	Peak chart positions						Certifications	Album
Year	Title	UK	AUS	CAN	IRE	SCO	US Dance	Certifications	Album
2013	"Trouble"	12	–	93	–	4	18		Welcome to the Jungle
2014	"Braveheart"	4	19	–	20	2	–	UK: Silver; AUS: Gold	Welcome to the Jungle
2014	"Welcome to the Jungle"	7	–	–	46	4	–		Welcome to the Jungle
2014	"Louder"	14	–	–	86	6	–		Welcome to the Jungle
2014	"Can't Stop the Love" (featuring Snob Scrilla)	–	–	–	–	–	–		Welcome to the Jungle
"—" denotes a recording that did not chart or was not released in that territory.

== Tours ==
Opening act

- Jessie J – Alive Tour (2013) (Birmingham, Sheffield & Aberdeen only)

== Awards and nominations ==
Year	Award	Category	Outcome
2014	Urban Music Awards	Best Female Act	Won
2014	Urban Music Awards	Best Group	Won
2014	Glamour Women of the Year Awards	Band of the Year	Nominated
2014	4Music Video Honours	Best Breakthrough	Nominated
2014	Nickelodeon Kids' Choice Awards	UK Favourite Breakthrough	Nominated
2015	Teen Choice Awards	Choice Music: Next Big Thing	Nominated
2015	APRA Music Awards	Dance Work of the Year for "Braveheart"	Nominated
