= Snob Scrilla =

Sean Ray
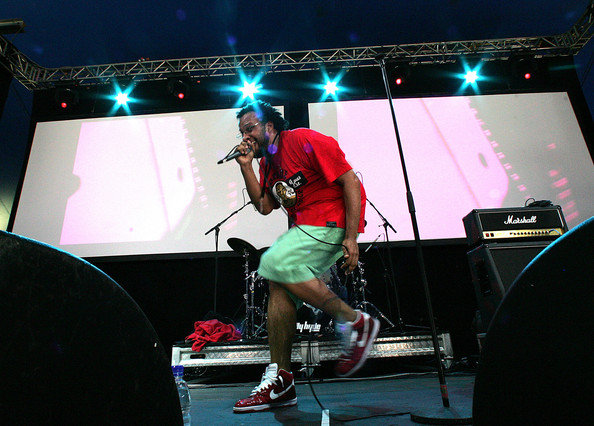
- Snob Scrilla in concert, 2008.
- Born: February 23, 1984 (age 42); Clovis, California, United States
- Other name: Snob Scrilla
- Occupations: Singer; songwriter
- Years active: 2007–2011
- Partner: Cassie Davis (2009-2011)
- Musical career
- Origin: Sydney, New South Wales, Australia
- Genres: Indie, Hip Hop, Electronic
- Instrument: Vocals
- Label: Ivy League Records
- Website: Official Site

Sean Ray is an American-Australian rapper, producer and musician based in Sydney, Australia.

== Biography ==
Sean Ray Mullins, known by his alias Snob Scrilla, was born in Clovis, California where he attended Buchanan High School. After moving to Australia and making a hometown of Katoomba, New South Wales, it was whilst living in Newcastle that Ray began making music. This was followed by a relocation to Sydney.

His popularity amongst Australian Indie crowds is largely due to his debut single in 2008 titled "There You Go Again". He has played at Parklife and Homebake 2008, he has also been a supporting artist for Faker's 2008 tour as the opening act.

He wrote the ARIA Award-winning, multi platinum Jessica Mauboy hit song "Running Back".

The song officially titled "........." (nine periods), generated massive interest as the soundtrack for a promotional advertisement for the show Rush on Network 10.

Snob Scrilla became the support act for Matisyahu's Australian leg of his 2009 tour.

Snob Scrilla's first headline tour the "Farewell Monkey Tour" began in August 2009 and toured Australia nationally. Dash and Will, Amy Meredith and other provided support acts for various shows. Soon after he began touring as official support for Phrase's Clockwork tour.

The Adelaide radio station "Nova 91.9" dedicated a day for listeners of the show to 'Zombie Shuffle' with Snob Scrilla down Rundle Mall.

In 2011 he produced the club song We Run The Night by Havana Brown and announced he was relocating to Los Angeles to work on the next album.

He also appeared on the track "Can't Stop the Love" by British girl group Neon Jungle, which was on their debut album Welcome to the Jungle.

== Discography ==
=== Albums ===
- Day One – Ivy League Records (2009)

=== EPs ===
- The Day Before – Ivy League Records – (2008)

=== Singles ===
- "There You Go Again" (2008)
- "Houston" (2008)
- "Heartbreak Scorsese" (2009)

=== Other charted songs ===
List of other charted songs, with selected chart positions
Title	Year	Peak chart positions	Album
Title	Year	AUS	Album
"........."	2009	41	Day One

== Band members ==
- Ardie Worsley - Drums & Percussion (2008-2011)
- Miles Readman - Keys & Synths (2010-2011)
- Cassian Stewart Kassimba - Keys & Synths (2008-2010)
- Leon Seenandan - Guitars (2008-2010)
- Wax Motif - DJ (2008-2010)
