= Welcome to the Jungle (Neon Jungle album) =

Studio album by Neon Jungle
- Released: 28 July 2014
- Recorded: 2013–2014
- Label: RCA
- Producer: Snob Scrilla; soFLY & Nius; Fear of Tigers

Singles from Welcome to the Jungle
- 1. "Trouble" Released: 1 September 2013; 2. "Braveheart" Released: 19 January 2014; 3. "Welcome to the Jungle" Released: 20 April 2014; 4. "Louder" Released: 20 July 2014; 5. "Can't Stop the Love" Released: 15 December 2014

Welcome to the Jungle is the only studio album by British girl group Neon Jungle, released on 28 July 2014 by RCA Records.

== Critical reception ==
Welcome to the Jungle received mixed to positive reviews from contemporary music critics, who commended the group as a whole and their originality, whilst some felt they had not yet "found their sound". Ally Carnwath of The Guardian called the album a "mixed bag, front-loaded with singles and with the requisite number of formulaic club bangers, but also containing some flashes of personality and nicely executed ideas". Stoke Sentinel was more positive, saying that the album "has even more to give [with] no filler tracks here". Helena Ho of Renowned for Sound gave the album 3 out of 5 stars and bemoaned its track listing, but she complimented individual tracks and called it "a solid debut from Neon Jungle, with a lot of ... standouts".

== Cover versions ==
The song "Waiting Game" by Banks was covered on Welcome to the Jungle without the singer's knowledge. Her single of the song had debuted at No. 99 on the UK Singles Chart in January 2014 after being featured in a Victoria's Secret commercial, and was due to be featured on her debut album, Goddess.

Banks posted to her Facebook account that although the use of her song was apparently legal, she felt "really icky" that so personal a song had been used on another album before it could appear on hers. Helena Ho described the Neon Jungle version as a "mess" that is "horribly over-sung and nowhere near captures the sultriness of the original", while Rebecca Mattina was more positive, saying that while their version "doesn’t quite have the same deep and intense allure that Banks commands with her emotionally delicate vocals, I can’t deny the power Amira and Shereen bring to those runs at the end".

The album also contains a cover version of Hozier's "Take Me to Church".

== Track listing ==
No.	Title	Writer(s)	Producer(s)	Length
1.	"Braveheart"	Cassie Davis; Sean Ray	More Mega	3:44
2.	"Welcome to the Jungle"	Davis; Ray; Pierre-Antoine Melki; Raphaël Judrin; Yoan Chirescu	soFLY & Nius	3:34
3.	"Trouble"	Mathmatica; Benjamin Berry; Anita Blay	Mathmatica	2:32
4.	"Louder"	Duck Blackwell; Adam Argyle; Jetta John-Hartley	Blackwell	3:24
5.	"Can't Stop the Love" (featuring Snob Scrilla)	Davis; Ray; Wayne Wilkins	More Mega; Wilkins	3:42
6.	"Bad Man"	Davis; Ray	More Mega	3:29
7.	"Sleepless in London"	Davis; Ray	More Mega; Wilkins	3:14
8.	"Waiting Game"	Jillian Banks; Chris Taylor	Jax Jones; SOHN	3:03
9.	"So Alive"	Charlotte Aitchison; Jarrad Rogers; Ana Diaz	Rogers	3:14
10.	"Fool Me"	Blackwell; Argyle; John-Hartley	Blackwell	3:13

Welcome to the Jungle — iTunes Store deluxe edition
No.	Title	Writer(s)	Length
11.	"Future X Girl"	Blay; Aminata Kabba	2:47
12.	"London Rain"	Berry; Blay; Uzoechi Osisioma Emenike	3:23
13.	"Fool Me" (Acoustic)	Blackwell; Argyle; John-Hartley	2:51
14.	"Trouble" (The Line of Best Fit Session)	Mathmatica; Berry; Blay	2:33
15.	"Take Me to Church" (Hozier cover)	Hozier	4:04

Welcome to the Jungle — iTunes Store pre-order bonus track
No.	Title	Writer(s)	Length
16.	"Royals" (The Line of Best Fit Session)	Ella Yelich O'Connor; Joel Little	3:44

== Charts ==
Chart (2014)	Peak position
Australian Albums (ARIA)	48
Scottish Albums (OCC)	7
UK Albums (OCC)	8
UK Album Downloads (OCC)	11

== See also ==
- List of UK top-ten albums in 2014
