= Trouble (Neon Jungle song) =

2013 single by Neon Jungle

Single by Neon Jungle

from the album Welcome to the Jungle
- Released: 30 August 2013
- Genre: Electropop; dance-pop
- Length: 2:32
- Label: RCA
- Songwriters: Benjamin Berry; Anita Blay
- Producers: CocknBullKid; Fear of Tigers

Neon Jungle singles chronology
"Trouble" (2013)	"Braveheart" (2014)

"Trouble" is the debut single recorded by British girl group Neon Jungle for their debut and only studio album, Welcome to the Jungle (2014). "Trouble" was released on 3 September 2013 by RCA Records, and was written and produced by CocknBullKid and Benjamin Berry. The song made its UK Singles Chart debut a week later at number twelve.

== Background and release ==
"It's one of those songs where you can't not tap your foot or bang your head. It's so catchy. We're four individuals with massive personalities and energy. Sometimes we can come across as a bit too much for people."

— Neon Jungle speaking to Patrick Gough of Bournemouth Daily Echo about the song.

Neon Jungle got together with English singer-songwriter CocknBullKid and British electronic band Fear of Tigers to develop "Trouble". In an interview with Lewis Corner of Digital Spy, Amira McCarthy described the song's development process, saying, "I think we just went into it with a positive attitude. When we did it, it was so much fun, but when it came out it was a shock. We all love the song and we're happy it's gone down well." The song was written with the intention of showcasing the band's fun and youthful side, in addition to having a raw and chaotic sound. In an interview with 4Music, Shereen Cutkelvin quipped, "The same energy and attitude that came from 'Trouble' – that's going to be there throughout our career." The group was then signed to RCA Records in June 2013 and performed "Trouble" for the first time as a signed group at the RCA Showcase. Speaking to Anna Hughes-Chamberlain of Hunger TV, Jess Plummer elaborated on the performance, "It was so nerve wracking but we had performed 'Trouble' a few times before and we really connected with that song, so even though we were all really nervous we just saw it as, 'do you know what, we're going to just go in there and enjoy ourselves, we're going to have fun' and thankfully everyone seemed to love it!"

A remix of "Trouble" by French house producer Monsieur Adi was released on 10 July 2013. The remix was honed with positive reviews from contemporary critics, Sam Lansky of music website Idolator wrote, "'Trouble' gets reconfigured as a club-ready dancefloor banger, all video game bloops framing that irresistible 'I don't look for trouble but trouble looks for me' hook before it collapses into a tangle of electro snarls." A teaser of the song and its accompanying music video was released online on 12 July 2013, The same day the full version premiered on Heat Radio. Capital FM playlisted the song on 8 August 2013. Originally planned for release in early August 2013, "Trouble" was made available by RCA on 30 August 2013 as Neon Jungle's debut single. It was released in a digital EP format featuring remixes of the song by Patrick Hagenaar and Sharoque, as well as a reworking by the track's producer Fear of Tigers, in addition to the Monsieur Adi Remix and original version. A CD single format of "Trouble" was made available on 1 September 2013 in the United Kingdom only.

== Composition ==
"Trouble" is an uptempo electropop and dance-pop which incorporates elements of EDM and lasts for a duration of two minutes and 32 seconds. It features a repetitive, shout-along chorus, energetic high jinks and robust rapping. Instrumentally, the song consists of electronica and brass. The song's sticky hook is drawingly delivered around riotous and energetic vocals sung in an aggressive manner. Neon Jungle use a chanting vocal to sing "Trouble" over its pulsing beat and dizzy bassline. Sonically, the song has been described to be feisty, chaotic and hyperactive.

"Our first single 'Trouble' is quite chaotic and has lots of attitude. It is quite raw and stripped back. We are prone to trouble, we're a bit of a magnet... but it's one of those things, we don't actually look for trouble."

— The group talking to the Daily Record and FlavourMag about the lyrics of the song.

Lyrically, the song centralized around themes of danger and risk with regard to the group. In contrast, the band has explained that listeners should not take the song literally as it's promoting concepts of fun and youthfulness, and not the general idea of trouble. The song is mainly based on the chorus hook, "‘I don't look for trouble, trouble looks for me and it's been waiting around corners since I was 17," which was deemed by music webzine The Turn Mag as an "anthem for bad girls with good intentions." Another key hook is its "Hey, hey" shouts which are chanted throughout the song. Bradley Stern of music website MuuMuse highlighted the verse "People say I'm heartless, I just learned to use my heart less / I go hard 'cause I'm hardest and we ain't even started!" as being big, bold and brag-like, in addition to deeming the song lyrically care-free. Digital Spy's Lewis Corner noted that the track's lyrics "make you stand up and take notice." The song has also been described as "ballsy" and "in-your-face" by other critics, while musically, "Trouble" is said to be both dancefloor and radio-friendly. The song has also been heavily compared to Spice Girls' "Wannabe" (1996), Girls Aloud's "Sound of the Underground" (2002), and Icona Pop's "I Love It" (2012), for sonic and lyrical similarities. Production-wise, "Trouble" has been deemed similar to that of Australian duo NERVO due to its "pounding EDM energy."

== Critical reception ==
The song has received critical acclaim from music critics. Digital Spy's Lewis Corner awarded "Trouble" four out of five stars, commenting, "'Trouble' packs a punch hard enough to make you stand up and take notice." Corner further noted that the song has "a hook that draws you in and fiercely defies you to let go," concluding, "as far as first singles go it's little less than a triumphant piece of pop." Jim Carroll from The Irish Times praised the song, describing it as "a wham-bam, day-glo blast of pop sass, energetic high jinks and sticky-as-chewing-gum hooks." Music website Record of the Day honed "Trouble" as well executed modern pop that should have no trouble finding a young audience. Loud Magazine's Emma Austin positively reviewed the track, writing "Punchy, poppy and guaranteed to get stuck in your head." Austin also echoed other critics comparisons by likening the track to the sound of the Spice Girls' 1996 album Spice. Idolator's Sam Lansky wrote, "Not only is that chorus lyric one of my favorite pop lines of the year, it's proof perfect that Neon Jungle have as much of a future in the clurb as they do on pop radio." Lansky went on to opine that the song has a freshness to it which he described as "invigorating" and a "gleaming shot of electrogrit built around the most marvelously nasty hook." He concluded his review, commenting, "['Trouble' is] a summer smash, a dancefloor filler, and the kind of enormous, we're-here-deal-with-it introduction that all the best UK girl groups have had. The Hits Radio called "Trouble" an attitude-packed pop anthem. Bradley Stern from music website MuuMuse positively reviewed the track, writing, "'Trouble' is an absolutely unruly pop stormer, busting out with all the pounding EDM energy of a NERVO banger and riotous energy of Icona Pop's shout-y summer anthem, 'I Love It.'" In his review, Stern added, "The song's full of big, bold brags along the way, but it’s really all about the chorus, which is repeated endlessly — but at least it’s a damn good one." He concluded, saying, "Like the Aloud's 'Sound of the Underground,' or even the Spice Girls' 'Wannabe,' 'Trouble' is a pretty ballsy, in-your-face way to say hello to the world." Jon O'Brein of Yahoo! Celebrity complimented the track's combination of "in-your-face feistiness of the Spice Girls with the turbo-charged EDM pop of Icona Pop," naming it an unashamedly brash debut single which suggests the girlband are not kidding when they claim that 'trouble is our middle name'." A writer for music website Popjustice deemed the song "one of the smartest and most unusual debut singles in recent girlband history". The writer likened the song to Icona Pop's "I Love It", arguing, "But rather than being a cupcakes-and-rainbows version of 'I Love It' softened up for a major label girlband, the lyrics, production and overall hysteria of the tune feel even harder." The website's writer honed the track as "basically mental", adding, "It's fresh and fiercely electronic without being 'EDM'." Popjustice placed "Trouble" at number 43 in their 'Top 45 Singles of 2013' list.

== Commercial performance ==
According to a report by Digital Spy on 4 September 2013, "Trouble" was at number ten on the midweek chart for the United Kingdom, but by the end of the week, it debuted at number 12 on the UK Singles Chart, selling 22,249 copies in its first week. It then dropped to number 30 in its second week and went on to spend a total of three weeks on the chart. As of 3 October 2013, "Trouble" has sold a total of 37,400 copies in the United Kingdom. Speaking to Andrew Bloss of the Croydon Guardian, Plummer explained the group's excitement with regard to the single's chart performance, "I can’t believe we have 5,000 followers on Twitter, we only came out two months ago with no one having a clue who we are and we still made it to number 12. It is mind blowing, we are all so grateful to everyone supporting us, this is only the beginning. Neon Jungle to take over." In Scotland, the single debuted at number four, falling to number 15 in its second week, and spending a total of three weeks on the chart. In the United States, it was reported by Billboard on 19 December 2013 that "Trouble" debuted at number 18 on Dance/Electronic Songs and at number nine on Dance/Electronic Digital Songs, selling 11,000 copies in its first week, following the group's performance of the song during Victoria's Secret Fashion Show.

== Music video ==
=== Background ===
It didn't feel like work at all, it was just like a fun day out. We were doing the whole shoot on like two hours sleep each but I was buzzing by the end of it as much as I was at the beginning. So fun! It was just one of those days where we had to find energy from somewhere. I don't know where we found it from. Just everyone on the day, from the director to the runners were all just lovely. Like a family environment sort of thing.

—Neon Jungle speaking to Emma Austin of Loud Magazine about the music video.

It was directed by Emil Nava, who Neon Jungle enjoyed working with, the group said that he was "crazy" and that "you can't not have energy with him 'cause he'll just bring it out of you." The music video was shot on a quiet suburban property. A journalist from The Guardian mentioned, "The video for their first single, 'Trouble', is filmed in a nice detached suburban home in a leafy street to show how they've come to besiege such safe middle-class environs." The only direction the girl band had during the production was that they had to just go mad, which by its completion they thought they had accomplished. Asami Zdrenka mentioned, "It was the most fun ever just being able to go mad." Group member, Plummer told Anna Hughes-Chamberlain of Hunger TV that shooting the music video was the most surreal thing that has happened to her, adding, "I woke up in my own bed and was like, 'was that a dream?'" A teaser of the music video was released on 12 July 2013, the full video then premiered online three days later on 15 July 2013.

The music video is labelled with requirement of Parental Advisory, and starts out with individual shots and scenes of each Neon Jungle group member. The video sees the group tear up a house, Bradley Stern of MTV Buzzworthy noted that the girl band "go positively nuts o' clock" in the music video. The production makes use of ten different chihuahuas, which Neon Jungle grew very fond of, revealing that they were tempted to steal them. Shereen Cutkelvin said, "It broke my heart when they had to go." The storyline is based on the group making their way to a party and then destroying the house where the party takes place. In the music video, Zdrenka sports a Versus by Gianni Versace floral shirt while Amira McCarthy is seen wearing a Versace jeans couture rare chessboard jeans and jacket. The video also sees the group riding bicycles in the street of a suburban neighbourhood. Other scenes in the production include the smashing of a pot dalmatian, meat carving, knocking over food and plates. The group are also seen jumping around and shaking their often throughout. Young male actors also appear in the video, of whom have been described as "fit" by Carl Smith from Sugarscape.com.

=== Reception ===
MTV Buzzworthy's Bradley Stern positively reviewed the music video, writing, "the video for 'Trouble' certainly doesn't tread cautiously, as the foursome ferociously tear through a suburban house in a high energy haze." Stern added, "Unlike some of their competition, Little Mix and The Saturdays, Neon Jungle steer well clear of the clichéd coordinating outfits and choreographed routines and instead, just as the Spice Girls did, actually inject a bit of personality into their brand." In a review for MuuMuse, Stern felt that it was quite the introduction to the girl band, concluding, "it's essentially an episode of Bad Girls Club set to music or maybe the sequel to Miley Cyrus' 'We Can't Stop'." Emma Austin from Loud Magazine deemed it a fun music video, complimenting its variety and chaotic look. Sugarscape.com's Carl Smith called the visual "raucous, totes spontaneous, all-very-unapologetic and pretty bloody amazing to say the least." A writer for The Hits Radio echoed Smith's view, also honing the music video as "raucous". Idolator's Sam Lansky opined, "It-s clear why Shereen, Asami, Jess and Amira are already inviting comparisons to Spice Girls and Girls Aloud." Lansky went on to write that the music video really shines as a proper introduction to the group, highlighting its "attitude" and "swag", as well as commenting, "[the video] generally gives the appearance of being much cooler than you." A journalist for The Guardian wrote, "As subversive female behaviour goes, it's closer to Tulisa, say, than Lydia Lunch." While music website Record of the Day called it a riotous party video that hits the mark. "Trouble" has been viewed more than a million times since its release on YouTube in July.

== Formats and track listings ==
- CD single
1. "Trouble" – 2:32
- Digital EP
1. "Trouble" – 2:32
2. "Trouble" (Fear of Tigers Remix) – 4:05
3. "Trouble" (Monsieur Adi Remix) – 5:32
4. "Trouble" (Patrick Hagenaar Remix) – 3:01
5. "Trouble" (Sharoque) – 3:48

== Credits and personnel ==
Credits adapted from Broadcast Music (BMI).

- Lead vocals – Shereen Cutkelvin, Amira McCarthy, Jessica Plummer, Asami Zdrenka
- Songwriting – Benjamin Berry, Anita Blay
- Production – CocknBullKid, Fear of Tigers

== Charts ==
Chart (2013)	Peak position
Canada Hot 100 (Billboard)	93
Scotland Singles (OCC)	4
UK Dance (OCC)	3
UK Singles (OCC)	12
US Dance/Electronic Songs (Billboard)	18
