= Swarmz =

English rapper and boxer

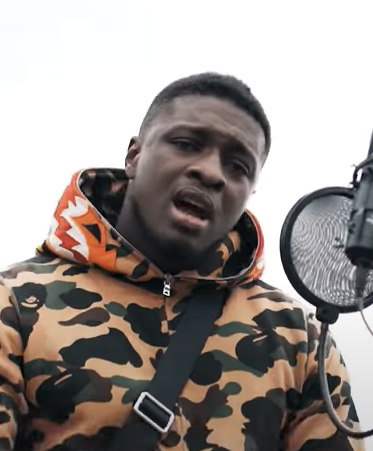
- Scott on Mixtape Madness in 2018

Background information
- Born: Brandon Scott; 11 September 1996 (age 30); Eltham, London, England
- Genre: British hip hop Afroswing
- Occupations: Rapper; Singer; songwriter; footballer; Professional boxer
- Years active: 2017–present
- Label: Virgin Records
- Boxing career
- Nickname: The Madman
- Height: 5 ft 9 in (175 cm)
- Weight: Light heavyweight
- Reach: 77 in (196 cm)
- Stance: Orthodox

Boxing record
- Total fights: 6
- Wins: 2
- Win by KO: 2
- Losses: 4

Brandon Montel Scott (born 11 September 1996), known professionally as Swarmz, is an English rapper and professional boxer.

He released his breakout single "Lyca" in 2018 which lead him to sign with Virgin Records. He was featured on "Houdini" with KSI and Tion Wayne which reached number 6 in the UK Singles Chart. He then began releasing diss tracks to coincide with his boxing career starting with "KSI Diss Track."

He made his boxing debut as a last minute replacement for KSI at MF & DAZN: X Series 001 and lost via 2nd round knockout. He returned and fought Ryan Taylor at X Series 004 and won via 1st round technical knockout. He then fought Deji Olatunji at X Series 007 and lost via unanimous decision. He then fought BDave, NichLmao and Ryan Johnston in a survival tag match at X Series 008. He was scheduled to rematch Taylor at X Series 10 – The Prime Card, but on October 11, 2023, Taylor was reportedly arrested, forcing him to pull of the fight, and leaving Ed Matthews to step in as a last-minute replacement. He lost via knockout in the first round.

== Early and personal life ==
Brandon Scott was born in the borough of Greenwich, London. He is of Barbadian and Jamaican descent. During his childhood, Scott was heavily inspired by the music his family was listening to, including a variety of Jamaican artists. By the time he was attending school, he and his friends had started rapping.

On 24 May 2020, Scott was involved in a car crash near London's Trafalgar Square. A Ferrari 488 rented for a music video shoot crashed into a London bus on Northumberland Avenue. After the crash, he posted videos of the smashed car onto his Instagram account. No injuries were sustained and no arrests were made.

== Football career ==
Scott is a lifelong Arsenal supporter. During his teenage years, Scott was a talented footballer and played for the youth academies of Fulham, Charlton Athletic and Southend United. While at Southend, he had a short loan spell at National League South club East Thurrock United. He was then released by Southend in 2016. After being released, Scott signed for Isthmian League side Cray Wanderers. In 2017, Scott signed for National League South club Whitehawk. In 2018, he quit football to pursue his music career.

== Music career ==
=== 2017–2022: Early releases and breakout ===
Scott started making music as a hobby alongside his youth football career. He originally started making freestyles on SoundCloud, where he went by the name Swarmzy-B, which he later shortened to Swarmz when he started making music professionally. He released his first video, titled "Money" in 2017 which picked up over 200k views on YouTube. He then released another single, titled "Murda" in early 2018. His breakthrough single, "Lyca", was released later that year. After the single went viral, he was signed to Virgin Records. The artist then proceeded to become a well-known name after releasing tracks such as "Bally" and "Motorola" which were brought to light after encouragement from friend Red Jackson.

In March 2020, Scott featured alongside Tion Wayne in KSI's single "Houdini", which reached number 6 in the UK Singles Chart.

=== 2022–present: Break and boxing diss tracks ===
In August 2022, Scott was scheduled to face KSI in a boxing match after Alex Wassabi withdrew, thus leading to Scott taking an indefinite break from his music career. On 16 August, Scott released a diss track to promote the bout directly at KSI titled "KSI Diss Track." On 7 January 2023, Scott released "Redemption", a diss track aimed at YouTuber Ryan Taylor ahead of their bout on 14 January. On 10 May, Scott released a diss track aimed at YouTuber Deji Olatunji ahead of their bout on 13 May.

== Boxing career ==
=== Swarmz vs KSI ===
On 7 August 2022, it was announced that Scott would be participating in a MF-professional boxing match against English YouTuber KSI at The O2 Arena, in London as the headliner for MF & DAZN: X Series 001. Originally, KSI was scheduled to face Alex Wassabi, however, due to a concussion, Wassabi was replaced by Scott whom had previously called out KSI on a TikTok live. However, Scott's bout with KSI was lowered to the opening bout as it was announced that KSI would be fighting twice on X Series 001, now headlining against Mexican professional boxer Luis Alcaraz Pineda. KSI defeated Scott via first round knockout and won the inaugural MFB cruiserweight title.

Scott was scheduled to return to the ring against English YouTuber Kristen Hanby on the undercard of X Series 002 at the Sheffield Arena in Sheffield on 15 October, but withdrew on 28 September as Scott required "more time to prepare."

=== Swarmz vs Taylor ===
On 5 December, Scott's return was announced against English BMX YouTuber Ryan Taylor on the undercard of X Series 004 at Wembley Arena in London on 14 January 2024. Scott won the bout via first-round technical knockout after Taylor suffered an eye injury and was forced to quit after two minutes and twelve seconds. On 10 February, it was announced that Scott had signed a multi-fight deal with Misfits Boxing.

=== Swarmz vs Deji ===
After his bout with Taylor, Swarmz proceeded to call out YouTubers King Kenny and KSI's younger brother Deji Olatunji. On 13 April 2024 the bout between Scott and Olatunji was announced as the co-feature for X Series 007 at Wembley Arena in London on 14 May. Olatunji defeated Scott via unanimous decision.

=== Survivor Tag ===
On 14 June, it was announced that Scott would compete in the first ever survivor tag crossover boxing match between three other fighters as the headliner for X Series 008 at the Nashville Municipal Auditorium in Nashville, Tennessee, US on 22 July. The bout included Singaporean YouTuber NichLmao, American YouTuber BDave and Canadian YouTuber Ryan Johnston. NichLmao won the bout via a points decision victory securing 117 points.

=== Swarmz vs Matthews ===
On 23 September, during the broadcast of X Series 009, it was announced that Scott and Taylor would have a rematch on the X Series 10 – The Prime Card preliminary card at Manchester Arena in Manchester on 14 October. The pair got into a brawl during their face off where Scott mentioned Taylor's child. However, on 11 October, Taylor was forced to withdraw from the bout after getting arrested. On 12 October, English TikToker Ed Matthews was announced as the replacement opponent. Matthews defeated Scott via first round knockout after thirty seconds. Scott later revealed he fractured his ankle during the bout.

=== Swarmz vs Pineda ===
After Scott had his bout with Deji at X Series 007, Luis Alcaraz Pineda called out Scott to a bout in the ring. On 21 November 2024, it was announced that Scott would return to the ring against Pineda—the same opponent KSI fought on the night when Scott was defeated by KSI—on the X Series 19 – Qatar: The Supercard Misfits Kick-Offs at the Lusail Sports Arena in Doha, Qatar on 28 November. Pineda defeated Scott via unanimous decision.

=== Swarmz vs Biel ===
On 26 April 2026, Scott announced a traditional rematch with American influencer BDave. Scott and BDave had previously fought each other in 2023 during the Survivor Tag bout. The bout scheduled to take place on 13 June at Manchester Arena in Manchester on the Misfits 23 – Beauty vs. The Beast undercard. However, on 11 June BDave withdrew due to an injury and was replaced by Brazilian Crypto influencer Biel.

=== Swarmz vs Buzzworl ===
During the broadcast of Jordan McCann vs. Big Stacks, Swarmz entered the ring and faced off with Ambush Buzzworl. A week later, Misfits announced the bout was scheduled to take place on 10 October on the Joey Essex vs. Dapper Laughs undercard at the Copper Box Arena in London. The bout ended in a split draw.

=== Swarmz vs A2nti ===
On 23 October, HSTikkyTokky's boxing promotion Unhinged announced that Swarmz would face TikToker A2nti on the Unhinged 3 undercard on 7 November in Kilkenny, Ireland.

== Discography ==
=== Singles ===
==== As lead artist ====
Title	Year	Peak chart positions	Certifications	Album
Title	Year	UK	Certifications	Album
"Its A Lie"	2017	—		Non-album single
"Lyca"	2018	55	BPI: Gold	Non-album single
"Next Up" (with Mixtape Madness)	2018	—		Non-album single
"Bally" (featuring Tion Wayne)	2019	32	BPI: Silver	Non-album single
"Motorola" (with Da Beatfreaks and Deno)	2019	32	BPI: Silver	Non-album single
"Mojo Jojo"	2019	—		Non-album single
"Freaky" (with Dappy and Poundz)	2020	62		Non-album single
"How Do You Want It" (with Krept and Konan and Bandokay)	2020	61		Non-album single
"Payslips" (with Bugzy Malone and M24)	2021	76		Non-album single
"Reload" (with Deno)	2021	—		Non-album single
"Deliveroo" (with Kwengface)	2022	—		Non-album single
"KSI Diss Track"	2022	—		Non-album single
"TKO"	2022	—		Non-album single
"Everybody Hates Kris"	2022	—		Non-album single
"Blessing"	2022	—		Non-album single
"Redemption"	2023	—		Non-album single
"One Punch"	2023	—		Non-album single
"99 Problems" (with Holly Molly)	2023	—		Non-album single
"Execution"	2023	—		Non-album single
"Take Time"	2023	—		Non-album single
"The Prime Card Diss Track"	2023	—		Non-album single
"Options"	2024	—		Non-album single
"Thoia Thong"	2026	—		Non-album single
"Can't Rush Greatness" (with Kezzle)	2026	—		Non-album single
"—" denotes a recording that did not chart or was not released in that territory.

==== As featured artist ====
Title	Year	Peak chart positions	Certifications	Album
Title	Year	UK	Certifications	Album
"Bang Like a Drum" (Donel featuring Swarmz)	2018	—		Non-album single
"Pumpy" (Da Beatfreakz featuring Swarmz, Deno, Cadet & AJ)	2018	—		Non-album single
"Drive By" (Tion Wayne featuring Swarmz)	2019	57		T Wayne's World 3
"Houdini" (KSI featuring Tion Wayne and Swarmz)	2020	6	BPI: Silver	Dissimulation
"Naughty Naughty" (Predz Uk featuring Swarmz, S1mba & Noizy)	2020	—		Non-album single
"—" denotes a recording that did not chart or was not released in that territory.

=== Guest appearances ===
List of non-single guest appearances, with other performing artists
Title	Year	Other artist(s)	Album
"Money"	2018	None	Riley JH Presents Warm Up EP 1
"Don't Let Go (Love)"	2018	Bastille, Craig David, Kianja	Other People's Heartache (Pt. 4)
"Home Alone"	2019	D-Block Europe, Deno	Home Alone
"Keisha & Becky (Remix)"	2019	Russ Millions, Tion Wayne, Jay1, Aitch, Sav'o	T Wayne's World 3
"Telescope"	2019	The Plug, Polo G, Anine	Plug Talk
"Roley"	2020	Cadet	The Rated Legend
"Get Out Of My Head (Remix)"	2021	Shane Codd, S1mba	Non Single Remix

== Boxing record ==
=== MF–Professional ===
7 fights	2 wins	4 losses
By knockout	2	2
By decision	0	2
Draws	1	

No.	Result	Record	Opponent	Type	Round, time	Date	Location	Notes
7	Draw	2–4–1	Ambush Buzzworl	SD	4	10 Oct 2026	Copper Box Arena, London, England	Two minute rounds
6	Win	2–4	Biel	TKO	2 (3), 1:48	13 Jun 2026	Manchester Arena, Manchester, England	
5	Loss	1–4	Luis Alcaraz Pineda	UD	3	28 Nov 2024	Lusail Sports Arena, Doha, Qatar	
4	Loss	1–3	Ed Matthews	KO	1 (3), 0:30	14 Oct 2023	Manchester Arena, Manchester, England	
3	Loss	1–2	Deji Olatunji	UD	4	13 May 2023	Wembley Arena, London, England	
2	Win	1–1	Ryan Taylor	TKO	1 (3), 0:49	14 Jan 2023	Wembley Arena, London, England	
1	Loss	0–1	KSI	KO	2 (3), 0:28	27 Aug 2022	The O2 Arena, London, England	

=== Exhibition ===
0 fights	0 wins	0 losses

No.	Result	Record	Opponent	Type	Round, time	Date	Location	Notes
1	Upcoming		A2anti	—N/a	– (3)	7 Nov 2026	Kilkenny, Ireland	

=== Survivor Tag ===
1 fight	0 wins	1 loss
By decision	0	1

No.	Result	Record	Opponents	Type	Round, time	Date	Location	Notes
1	Loss	0–1	Ryan Johnston	PTS	4	22 July 2023	Nashville Municipal Auditorium, Nashville, Tennessee, US	NichLmao won on points; No fighter was eliminated.
1	Loss	0–1	BDave	PTS	4	22 July 2023	Nashville Municipal Auditorium, Nashville, Tennessee, US	NichLmao won on points; No fighter was eliminated.
1	Loss	0–1	NichLmao	PTS	4	22 July 2023	Nashville Municipal Auditorium, Nashville, Tennessee, US	NichLmao won on points; No fighter was eliminated.

== Pay-per-view bouts ==
United Kingdom
No.	Date	Fight	Billing	Network	Buys	Revenue	Source(s)
1	27 August 2022	KSI vs Swarmz	2 Fights 1 Night	DAZN	445,000	£4,450,000	
Total					445,000	£4,450,000	
