= Deno (singer) =

British musician

- Also known as: Deno Driz
- Born: Deno Michael Mebrahtu; 23 September 2002 (age 24); Brixton, London, England
- Genres: R&B; afroswing; hip hop
- Occupations: Singer; songwriter; rapper; actor
- Years active: 2016–present
- Label: Independent
- Website: denodriz.com

Deno Michael Mebrahtu (born 23 September 2002), known mononymously as Deno, is a British-Eritrean singer, songwriter, rapper and actor from London. His parents are originally from Eritrea, and he was raised in South London. He came to the forefront of London's afro-wave music scene beginning in 2018 with a number of viral music videos and hit songs.

== Music career ==
=== Beginnings (2016–2017) ===
Deno attended Evelyn Grace Academy in Brixton, London.

In 2016, a friend of Deno asked him to freestyle and sing on his Snapchat after school. This was posted to Instagram with the "#imjustbait" hashtag. He gained thousands of followers. Further videos caught the attention of Stormzy, who retweeted one of them, got in touch, and took Deno into the studio with him to guest on his album Gang Signs & Prayer.

In 2016, Deno met rapper AJ at a Stratford Westfield get-together. The two began a creative partnership, beginning with Deno singing the chorus on AJ's track "Know Me". The video netted over 2.5 million views on YouTube. The same year, the pair, often styled AJ x Deno, recorded multiple songs. They began performing more consistently, including opening for Migos at IndigO2.

Deno & AJ were signed by Sony Columbia UK in 2017. They released singles from 2017, but did not find commercial success until 2018 with the hit "London" featuring EO. The video for "London" was streamed over 45 million times and peaked at No. 45 on the UK Singles Chart.

=== Rise to fame (2018–2021) ===
Deno met rapper Cadet on the set of the short film Shiro's Story Part 3 (2018). His ensuing collaboration with Cadet, the track "Advice", went viral, with over 30 million YouTube views. It reached No. 14 on the UK Singles Chart with over 500,000 sales, earning a Brit certified Gold Award. More singles followed as he featured on the hit "Pumpy" by Da Beatfreakz, also featuring past collaborators AJ, Swarmz and Cadet. In 2019, Deno released "First Days", a tribute to Cadet, who had died in a road collision in February of that year.

In September 2019, Deno released the single "Change" featuring DigDat, with a video directed by Darnell Depradine.

He teamed with men's global fashion wear brand BoohooMAN for a 30-piece fashion collection, launched in September 2019.

Deno appeared singing in the 2018 season of Idris Elba's TV series In the Long Run.

In late 2019, Deno released the EP Eye 2 Eye which has features such as Krept, Jay1 and DigDat.

In 2021, Deno released the mixtape "Boy Meets World" which has features such as J.I the Prince of N.Y, Chunkz, Unknown T, Cadet, Craig David, DDG, Jade Silva and Bandokay and Double Lz of rap collective OFB. The mixtape peaked at 31 on the UK Albums Chart.

== Discography ==
=== Mixtapes ===
Title	Album details	Peak chart positions
Title	Album details	UK
Boy Meets World	Released: 14 May 2021; Label: Columbia; Format: Digital Download, Streaming	31

=== Extended Plays ===
Title	Details
Eye 2 Eye	Released: 25 October 2019; Label: Columbia; Format: Digital Download, Streaming

=== Singles ===
==== As lead artist ====
List of singles as lead artist, with selected chart positions, showing year released and album name
Title	Year	Peak chart positions	Certifications	Album
Title	Year	UK	Certifications	Album
"London" (with AJ featuring EO)	2018	45	BPI: Platinum	Non-album single
"Advice" (with Cadet)	2018	14	BPI: Platinum	The Rated Legend
"Pumpy" (with Da Beatfreakz, Cadet, AJ and Swarmz)	2018	70	BPI: Silver	Non-album single
"First Days"	2019	71		Non-album single
"Lifestyle"	2019	82		Non-album single
"Motorola" (with Da Beatfreakz, Dappy and Swarmz)	2019	32	BPI: Silver	Non-album single
"Change" (featuring DigDat)	2019	53		Eye to Eye
"Walking On" (featuring Krept)	2019	—		Eye to Eye
"Link Up" (with Geko, Stefflon Don and Dappy)	2019	84		22
"Self-Obsessed" (with Da Beatfreakz, D-Block Europe and Krept & Konan)	2020	26	BPI: Silver	Non-album single
"Circles" (featuring OFB, Bandokay and Double Lz)	2020	36		Boy Meets World
"Lingo" (featuring J.I and Chunkz)	2021	57		Boy Meets World
"Drizzy"	2021	—		Boy Meets World
"Reload" (with Swarmz)	2021	—		Non-album singles
"Better Now"	2022	—		Non-album singles

=== As featured artist ===
List of singles as lead artist, with selected chart positions, showing year released and album name
Title	Year	Peak chart positions	Album
Title	Year	UK	Album
"Lamborghini" (Kosso featuring Deno)	2020	—	Non-album single
"Purple" (Charlie Sloth featuring Deno and Polo G)	2020	—	Non-album single
"Baby" (A1 x J1 featuring Deno)	2021	98	TBA

=== Guest appearances ===
List of non-single guest appearances, with other performing artists, showing year released and album name
Title	Year	Other artist(s)	Album
"Home Alone"	2019	D-Block Europe, Swarmz	Home Alone
"Chase Cash"	2019	Lil Berete	1 Way Out
"J LO"	2020	Nafe Smallz, Chip	Goat World
"Ying & Yang"	2020	GRM Daily, Chip	GRM 10
"Gang Gang"	2021	KSI, Jay1	All Over the Place

== Filmography ==
=== Television ===
Year	Title	Role	Network	Notes	Ref.
2017-2018	In the Long Run	Singing Boy	Sky One	6 episodes	

=== Web ===
Year	Title	Role	Notes	Ref.
2018	Shiro's Story	Bailey	Part 3 (Short YouTube Series)	
2020	The Re-Up	Brandon	Main Role, both parts	
