= Dele Alli =

English footballer (born 1996)

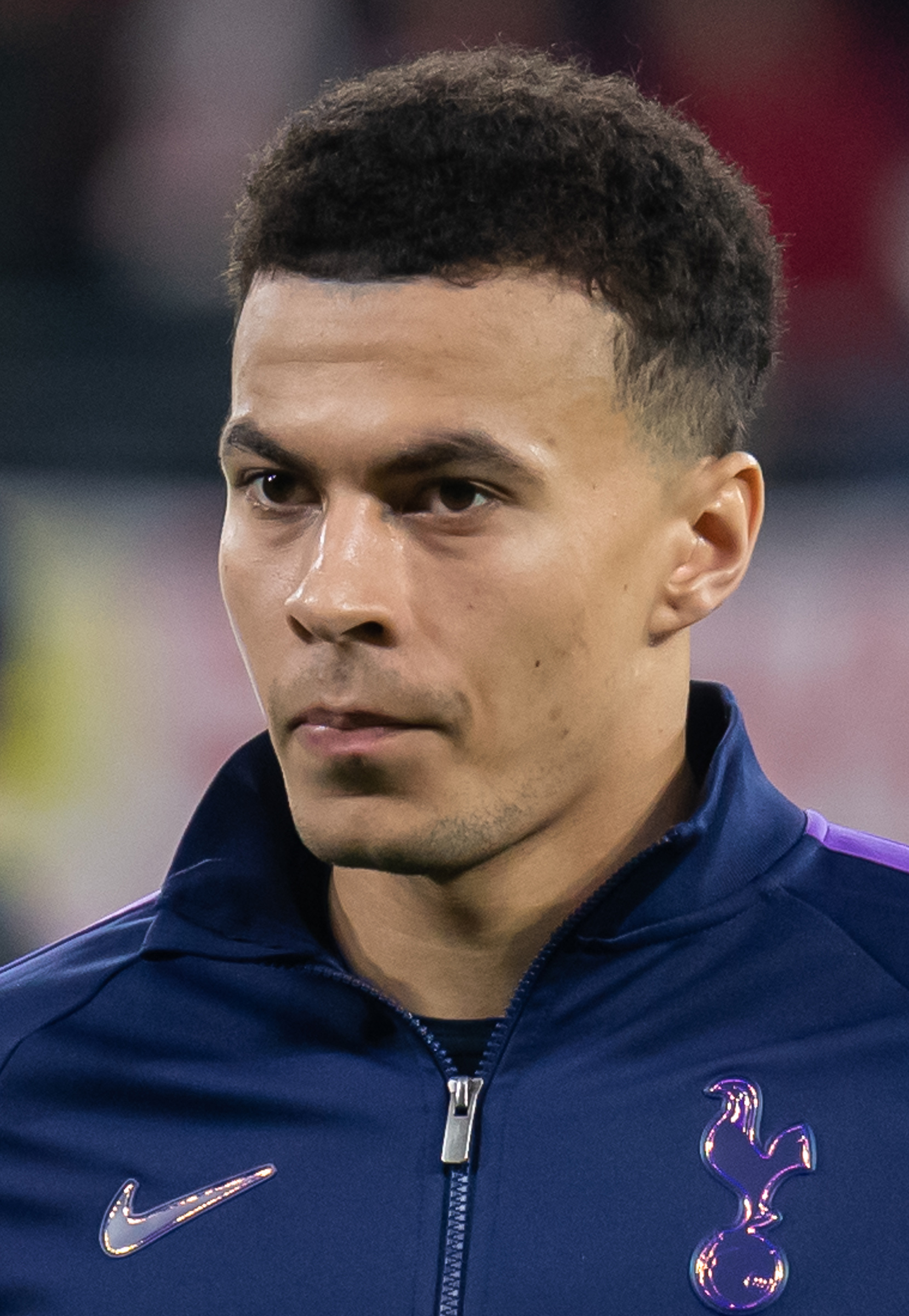
- Alli with Tottenham Hotspur in 2020

Personal information
- Full name: Bamidele Jermaine Alli
- Date of birth: 11 April 1996 (age 30)
- Place of birth: Milton Keynes, England
- Height: 6 ft 2 in (1.88 m)
- Position: Attacking midfielder

Youth career
- City Colts
- 2007–2012: Milton Keynes Dons

Senior career*
Years	Team	Apps	(Gls)
2012–2015	Milton Keynes Dons	62	(18)
2015–2022	Tottenham Hotspur	181	(51)
2015	→ Milton Keynes Dons (loan)	12	(4)
2022–2024	Everton	13	(0)
2022–2023	→ Beşiktaş (loan)	13	(2)
2025	Como	1	(0)

International career
2012–2013	England U17	9	(0)
2014	England U18	2	(0)
2014	England U19	4	(0)
2015	England U21	2	(0)
2015–2019	England	37	(3)
Medal record
Men's football
Representing England
UEFA Nations League
Third place	2019 Portugal
- * Club domestic league appearances and goals as of 19:17, 15 March 2025 (UTC)

Bamidele Jermaine "Dele" Alli (/ˈdɛli ˈæli/ DEL-ee AL-ee; born 11 April 1996) is an English professional footballer who plays as an attacking midfielder and is currently a free agent.

Born and raised in Milton Keynes, Dele joined the youth system at Milton Keynes Dons aged 11 and broke into the first team five years later, during the 2012–13 season. Over the next two and a half years, he made 88 official appearances for the team, scoring 24 goals. He signed for Tottenham Hotspur in February 2015 for an initial fee of £5 million, being loaned back to MK Dons for the remainder of the season. In each of his first two campaigns at Tottenham, Dele was voted the PFA Young Player of the Year and made the PFA Team of the Year. Towards the end of his time at Tottenham, Dele struggled with poor form, injury problems and fallouts with multiple managers. This led him to join Everton in January 2022 and later that year he joined Beşiktaş on loan. Dele left Everton after his contract expired in July 2024, but continued to work on his fitness at the club's facilities. He joined Serie A club Como under Cesc Fàbregas in January 2025, but made only one appearance for the club (which ended in him being given a red card for a foul against AC Milan's Ruben Loftus-Cheek), eventually having his contract terminated by mutual agreement in September 2025.

Dele played for the England U17, U18 and U19 teams, before making his senior debut in 2015. He was selected for UEFA Euro 2016 and the 2018 FIFA World Cup, playing a key role in helping England reach the semi-finals in the latter.

== Club career ==
=== Milton Keynes Dons ===
==== Early career ====
Dele joined the youth system at Milton Keynes Dons when he was 11 years old after playing for City Colts. He made his debut for the first team as a sixteen-year-old on 2 November 2012, coming on as a 64th-minute substitute for Jay O'Shea in a 0–0 draw with Southern Football League club Cambridge City in the FA Cup first round at Milton Road. His first touch in professional football was a back-heeled pass. His first goal came in the replay against Cambridge eleven days later, where he scored in a 6–1 win at Stadium MK on his first start. He made his league debut in a 2–3 defeat to Coventry City at home on 29 December, where he played 71 minutes before being replaced by Zeli Ismail. His only other league appearance in the 2012–13 Football League One season, came as a second-half substitute for Patrick Bamford in the last match of the season, a 2–0 win over Stevenage at Broadhall Way.

==== 2013–14 season ====
The 2013–14 season saw Dele break into the MK Dons first team on a regular basis. He started the Dons' first league match of the season, a 0–0 draw away at Shrewsbury Town. In his first Football League Trophy appearance, Dele scored to help MK Dons beat Northampton Town 2–0 and thus progress to the second round of the tournament. On 28 September, Dele scored his first professional league goal in a 4–1 win against Stevenage. After injury setbacks in late 2013, Dele subsequently established himself as a first-choice player in 2014. He scored the opening goal in the 3–2 win over Shrewsbury Town at Stadium MK on 11 January, with a header from Stephen Gleeson's pinpoint pass.

On 11 March 2014, against Notts County at Meadow Lane, aged 17 years and 11 months old, he scored a hat-trick to guide the Dons to a 3–1 victory. His next and final goal of the 2013–14 season, came on 5 April against Coventry City at the Sixfields Stadium; Dele struck a volley from 25 yards out as MK Dons defeated Coventry 2–1. He made 37 appearances in all competitions during the 2013–14 season, scoring seven times, with 33 appearances and six goals in the league.

==== 2014–15 season ====
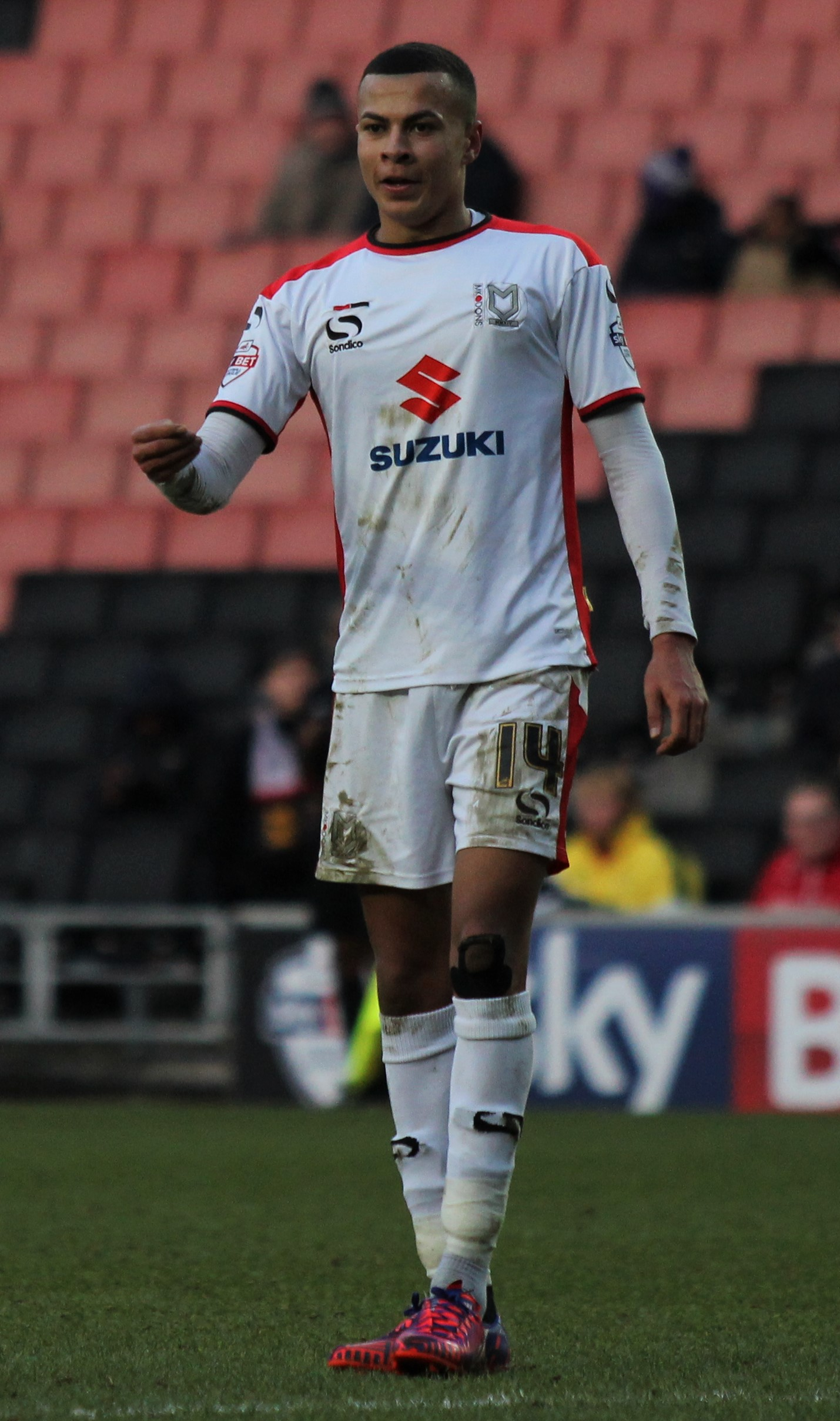
Alli playing for Milton Keynes Dons in 2015

With the departure of Gleeson to Birmingham City in June 2014, Dele became the first-choice central midfield partner to Darren Potter. He started the season brightly, playing the first league match of the season as the Dons overcame a 2–0 deficit to defeat Gillingham, 4–2. He then helped the team to a 3–1 win over arch-enemies, AFC Wimbledon, in the League Cup first round. His first goal of the 2014–15 season came in the first away league match, a 3–2 defeat to Peterborough United, where he scored a tap-in from Will Grigg's deflected shot.

On 26 August, Dele played the full 90 minutes in the League Cup second round as MK Dons recorded a historic 4–0 win over Manchester United. It was reported that numerous scouts from top clubs across Europe attended the match to watch him play, including representatives from Bayern Munich and Liverpool. In the next match, Dele continued his rich vein of form with a goal curled in from the edge of the box in a 2–0 win over Crawley Town. After the international break, he played 77 minutes in the 5–3 win against Barnsley, assisting the Dons second goal and scoring their third goal himself with a chip over the Barnsley goalkeeper. He was chosen as the Football League Young Player of the Month for August.

On 18 September, Dele extended his contract with MK Dons until June 2017. Two days later, in a match against Crewe Alexandra, he scored a hat-trick and achieved one assist in what turned out to be a 6–1 victory for the Dons. It was the second hat-trick of his career and the first he achieved at home, which also led to him winning the Man of the Match award.

=== Tottenham Hotspur ===
On 2 February 2015, Dele signed for Premier League club Tottenham Hotspur in the last hours of the mid-season transfer window on a five-and-a-half-year deal for an initial fee of £5 million.

==== Loan to Milton Keynes Dons ====
Following his transfer to Tottenham Hotspur, Dele was immediately loaned back to MK Dons for the remainder of the 2014–15 season. On 19 April, he was chosen as the Young Player of the Year at the Football League Awards. The season ended on 3 May with Milton Keynes Dons promoted automatically to the Championship as runners-up behind Bristol City, after a 5–1 home win over relegated Yeovil Town.

==== 2015–16 season ====
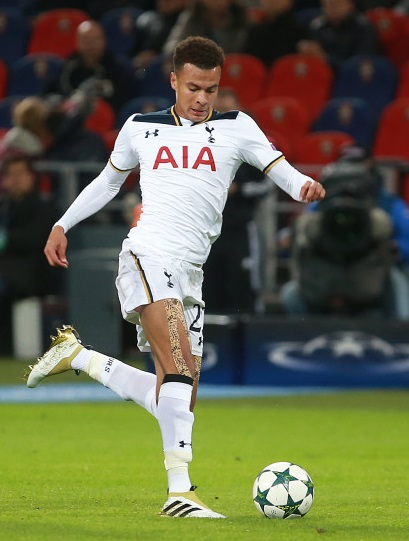
Dele playing for Tottenham Hotspur in 2016

On 8 August 2015, Dele made his Tottenham debut against Manchester United in the Premier League as a substitute in a 1–0 defeat away at Old Trafford, playing the last 13 minutes in place of Eric Dier. Two weeks later, he scored his first goal for the club after coming on for Christian Eriksen in the 1–1 draw against Leicester City.

On 13 September, Dele made his first start for Tottenham in a 1–0 win against Sunderland at the Stadium of Light. On 2 November, he started and scored the second goal in an eventual 3–1 win over Aston Villa. Six days later he started his first North London Derby alongside fellow England youngster Dier in central midfield, and was awarded Man of the Match in the 1–1 draw between rivals Arsenal and Tottenham. On 5 December 2015, he scored his third goal for Tottenham in the 2015–16 campaign in a 1–1 draw against West Bromwich Albion at The Hawthorns.

Following an impressive start to his Premier League career scoring five goals and making three assists in his first 18 league matches, he was rewarded with a new long-term contract until 2021 on 12 January. Eleven days later he scored a 25-yard volley in a 3–1 win at Crystal Palace; BBC Sport pundit and former Spurs player Garth Crooks wrote "I've seen some glorious goals scored in my time watching football matches but I doubt whether I will see a goal scored with such individual flair, and by a 19-year-old, as Dele Alli's goal at Selhurst Park – it was sheer class". On 13 April, he was named on the six-man shortlist for 2015–16's PFA Young Player of the Year.

On 18 April 2016, he scored his first brace for Tottenham in a 0–4 away win at Stoke City, reaching ten goals in his debut Premier League season. He was voted the season's PFA Young Player of the Year on 24 April. On 28 April, Dele was banned by the Football Association for three matches, effectively ending his Premier League season, for an off-the-ball incident against West Bromwich Albion in which he punched midfielder Claudio Yacob in the stomach. He later apologised for the incident on Twitter, stating, "Gutted that my season is over. Shouldn't have reacted like I did. Will learn from this and come back stronger."

==== 2016–17 season ====
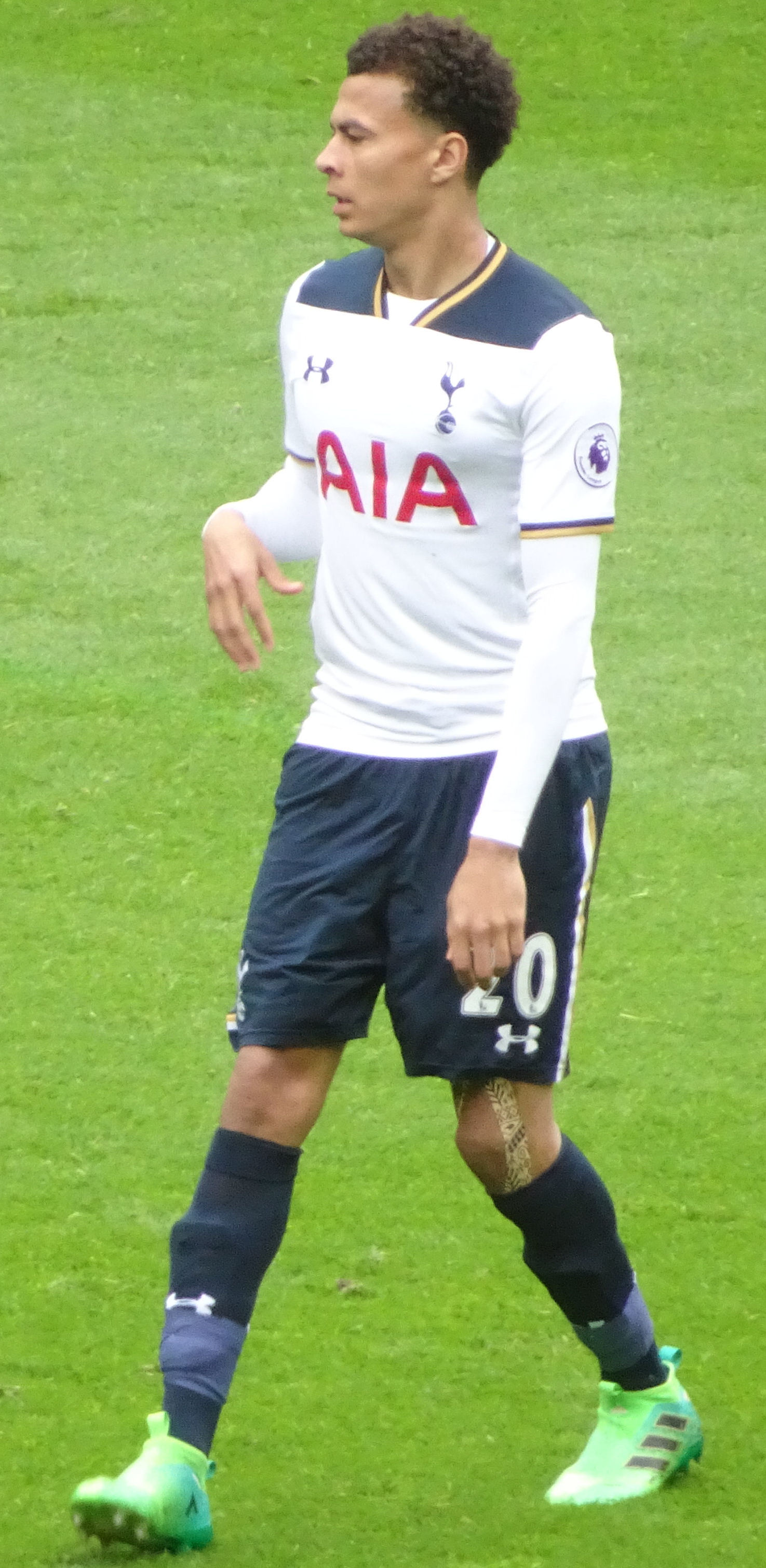
Dele playing for Tottenham Hotspur in 2017

Ahead of the season, he changed his kit name to Dele, saying that he had "no connection" to his legal surname due to his separation from his mother and lack of relations with his father. His first goal of the season came in a 4–0 win against Stoke City on 10 September 2016. Four days later, he made his UEFA Champions League debut in a 1–2 loss to AS Monaco at Wembley Stadium. His first Champions League goal came against CSKA Moscow at the same stadium on 7 December 2016. Between 18 December 2016 and 21 January 2017, Dele scored eight goals in six league matches, earning the award of Premier League Player of the Month award for January 2017. This included three consecutive braces against Southampton, Watford and Chelsea.

On 23 February, Dele received his first red card for a dangerous tackle on Brecht Dejaegere in Tottenham's UEFA Europa League draw with K.A.A. Gent which saw Spurs eliminated at the Round of 32 stage of the competition. On 20 April 2017, Dele was again named in the PFA Team of the Year, having been included in the League One selection for 2015 and the Premier League selection in 2016. On 23 April, he was named the PFA Young Player of the Year, the day after scoring in Tottenham's 4–2 FA Cup semi-final loss to rivals Chelsea at Wembley Stadium.

==== 2017–18 season ====
Dele scored his first goal of the season in the opening game of the 2017–18 season away at Newcastle that finished in a 2–0 win. However, he was criticized for his inconsistency this season, failing to perform as well as the previous season. On 1 April 2018, Dele scored twice in the away fixture against Chelsea, helping Tottenham win 3–1, which was their first win in 28 years at Stamford Bridge.

==== 2018–19 season ====
On 11 August 2018, Dele scored his first goal of the season, scoring the winning goal in the opening league match against Newcastle United.

On 26 September, Dele was named as captain for Tottenham's EFL Cup third round tie with Watford. The tie, played at Stadium MK due to delays in the completion of Tottenham's new stadium, marked Dele's return to the home ground of his boyhood club Milton Keynes Dons, and the return to his home town of Milton Keynes for the first time as a Tottenham player. The tie finished 2–2, with Dele scoring both a penalty in normal time and the winning penalty in a deciding penalty shoot-out.

In October 2018, Dele signed a new six-year deal at Tottenham, which would keep him at the club until 2024. He also scored in the 3–1 home win against Chelsea, which was his sixth goal in five games against Chelsea, and the first defeat for Chelsea in the Premier League this season. In January 2019, he was ruled out until March with a hamstring injury.

==== 2019–20 season ====
Dele missed the start of the season due to a hamstring injury. He returned to the team in the North London Derby on 1 September 2019, coming on as a substitute. He scored his first goal of the season in the match against Watford, drawing 1–1. In November 2019, Mauricio Pochettino was dismissed by the club to be replaced by José Mourinho. Mourinho played Dele as an attacking player just behind Harry Kane, reverting to his earlier position after playing in a deeper midfield role the previous two years. According to Mourinho, "Dele is not a midfield player". The attacking role gave Dele greater freedom to score, and he scored three goals in his first three games under Mourinho, two of which came in the game against Bournemouth.

In February 2020, Dele posted a video on his Snapchat account in which he appeared to mock an Asian man while joking about the COVID-19 outbreak. The video showed Dele wearing a face mask at Heathrow Airport while waiting for his flight to Dubai, before the camera moved to show a man of Asian appearance before zooming in on a bottle of antiseptic handwash, seemingly suggesting the Asian man in the terminal could be infected with the virus. The video was captioned: "The virus gunna have to be faster than that to catch me." In June 2020, Dele was found guilty of an "aggravated breach" of the FA rule that includes a reference to race, colour, ethnic origin and/or nationality, and was judged to have used an "unacceptable racist stereotype" by the regulatory commission. Dele was suspended in June 2020 for one match by the Football Association, making him ineligible for Tottenham Hotspur's Premier League game at home against Manchester United on 19 June. He was also fined £50,000 and ordered to undertake an education course.

==== 2020–21 season ====
In the first half of 2020–21 season, Dele was reportedly out of favour with Mourinho, making few starts in games. Most of his starts in games were in the UEFA Europa League, and he scored his first goal of the season in the Europa League play-off match against Maccabi Haifa on 1 October 2020 to cap a 7–2 win for Tottenham. In the Europa last-32 match against Wolfsberger on 24 February 2021, he scored a notable goal with a bicycle kick, starting a 4–0 rout with two further assists. He made his first start in six months in the Premier League on 4 March, in the match against Fulham that ended in a 1–0 win when his shot at goal was deflected off a defender for an own-goal. He started seven Premier League games this season.

==== 2021–22 season ====
On 22 August 2021, Dele scored his first goal of the season, scoring the only goal in a 1–0 win against Wolverhampton Wanderers. This was Dele's first Premier League goal since March 2020. He continued to struggle to regain his form. Manager Nuno Espírito Santo tried to bring him back into the squad, which proved short-lived as Nuno was replaced by Antonio Conte in early November. Dele failed to find a role under the new manager, and became a fringe player in Conte's plan for Tottenham. After starting only eight league games (two under Conte) in the 2021–22 campaign, Dele was made available for transfer by Tottenham in the January 2022 window.

=== Everton ===
Dele moved to fellow Premier League side Everton on 31 January 2022 on an initial free transfer, which could have risen to £40 million if certain performance benchmarks were met. The first £10 million would be due after 20 appearances for Everton. He signed a two-and-a-half-year contract, running until the end of the 2023–24 season. Upon signing for the club, Dele cited the opportunity to work under new manager Frank Lampard as a major reason for joining Everton. He made his debut on 8 February as a late substitute in a 3–1 loss against Newcastle United. Despite a notable cameo in Everton's 3–2 comeback win over Crystal Palace he failed to make an impact at Everton. In the 2021–22 season, he only made 11 appearances with only one start. In the next season Dele played in just two matches, ending his Everton stint with 13 matches and zero goal contributions.

==== Loan to Beşiktaş ====
On 25 August 2022, Dele joined Turkish team Beşiktaş on loan for the remainder of the 2022–23 season with an option to buy for the Turkish club. He scored his first goal in over a year in his second appearance for the club, helping the club win 3–2 against Ankaragücü on 4 September 2022. When Şenol Güneş took over as the new head coach on 28 October, he stated that Dele was "below expectations in terms of efficiency", pointing to his struggles for Beşiktaş. Dele did not play any games for Beşiktaş after 26 February 2023, having scored 2 goals in 13 games for the club until then. In April he returned to Everton for an assessment of a hip injury he picked up, while Beşiktaş sought to cancel his season-long loan.

==== Return to Everton from loan ====
Having sustained a groin injury in the later months of 2023, he did not make a single appearance for Everton in the 2023–24 season. Although Dele's contract with Everton expired at the end of June 2024, he continued to train at the club and complete his rehabilitation work with the club's medical staff.

=== Como ===
On 19 January 2025, Dele joined Italian Serie A club Como on a free transfer on an 18-month deal until the end of the 2025–26 season.

While Como manager Cesc Fàbregas told reporters on 19 February that Dele may not make his debut for the club until later in the season or even not until the 2025–26 season, saying "He's working off the pitch at the moment. I don't want to put extra pressure on him, he hasn't played for months...We need patience to see him back on the pitch: please, let's stay calm. The last few months will be used to get back in shape for next season", Dele was included in his first matchday squad for Como as an unused substitute for a 2–1 Serie A loss to AS Roma on 2 March.

On 15 March 2025, Dele made his debut for Como against AC Milan in the league, marking his first match since February 2023. However, his return to the pitch was brief, as he came on as a substitute for Lucas Da Cunha in the 81st minute, and was sent off ten minutes later for a clumsy challenge on fellow Englishman Ruben Loftus-Cheek after a VAR check upgraded his initial yellow card. In August 2025, it was reported that Dele was looking for a new club after being told he was not wanted for the upcoming season. He was released in September 2025, after just one appearance for the Italian side. Despite rumors of interest from clubs in La Liga and the EFL Championship, Dele remained a free agent.

== International career ==
Dele made several appearances at U17 and U18 levels for England. On 27 August 2014, Dele was called up to the England U19 squad following an impressive start to the campaign. He made his debut for England U19 in the 1–1 draw against Germany U19. In the match, Dele assisted the opening goal feeding a through ball to Bradley Fewster who gave England a 1–0 lead.

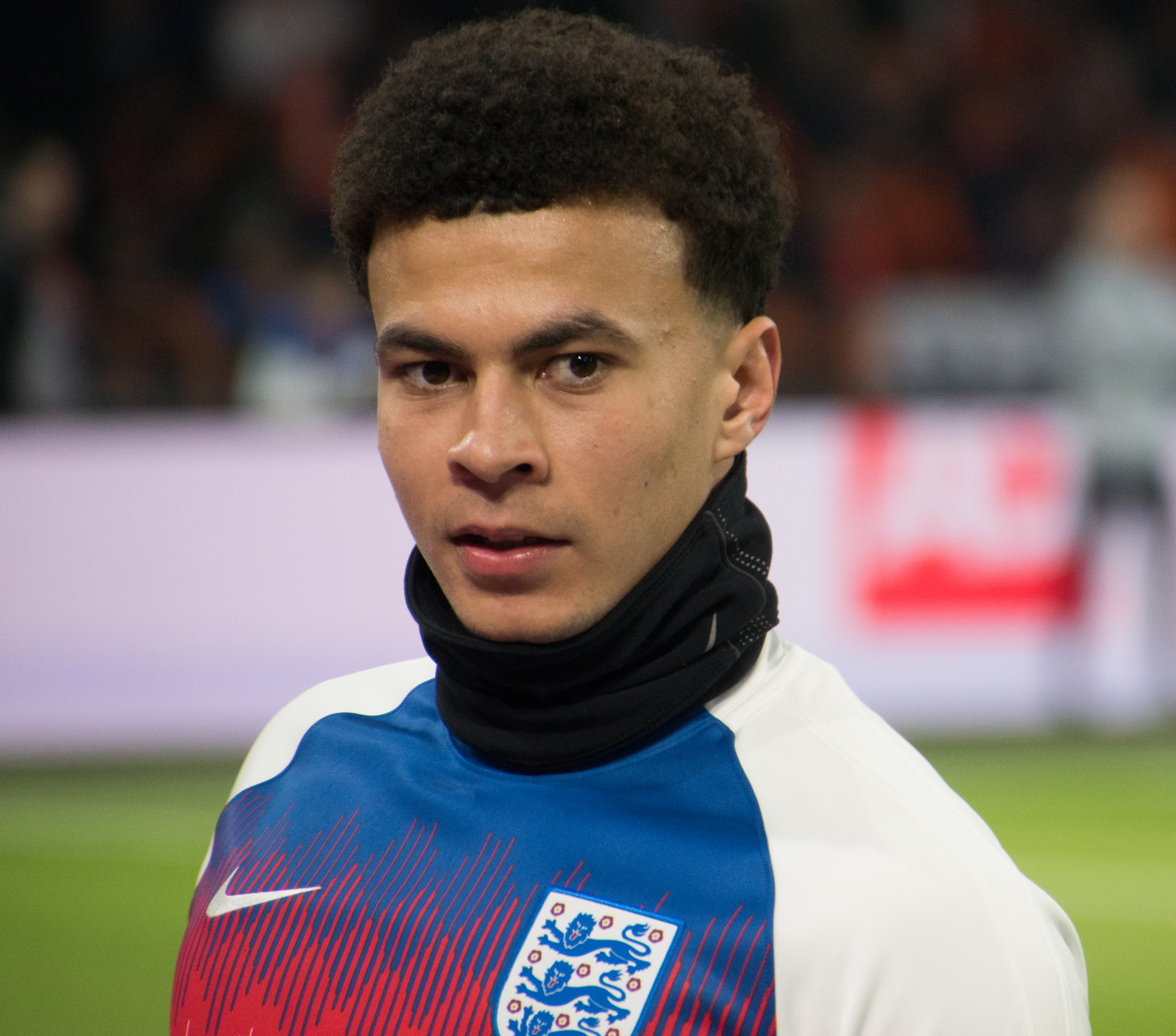
Dele warming up for England in 2018

In February 2015, it was reported that John Fashanu would try to convince Dele to play for Nigeria. However, on 1 October of that year, he was included in Roy Hodgson's England squad for the final UEFA Euro 2016 qualifying matches against Estonia and Lithuania. He made his debut against the former on 9 October, coming on as a late substitute for Ross Barkley in a 2–0 win.

On 17 November 2015, Dele made his first start for the England senior team, scoring the opening goal from a long range shot to beat Spurs teammate, goalkeeper Hugo Lloris in a 2–0 win against France at Wembley Stadium. He was again named in the starting line-up for England's friendly match against world champions Germany on 26 March 2016. Dele was named man of the match by the BBC Sport as England recovered from 0–2 down to win 3–2 at the Berlin Olympiastadion.

He was selected for Gareth Southgate's 23-man England squad for the 2018 FIFA World Cup. On 7 July, Dele scored the second goal of the game in a 2–0 win over Sweden in the quarter-finals of the competition, as England reached the semi-finals for the first time in 28 years. Dele played for England in the semi-final match against Croatia, winning a free-kick through which England took the lead, though they eventually lost 2–1 following extra-time.

In October 2019, he was left out of the England squad for the forthcoming Euro 2020 qualifying matches.

== Player profile ==
=== Style of play ===
Early in his career, Dele was widely considered one of the best young midfielders of his generation, and won PFA Young Player of the Year two years running. He was praised for his all-round skillset and his goalscoring prowess, particularly when playing as a second striker. Dele's manager at the time, Mauricio Pochettino, said in 2017: "In the box, he looks like a striker, and outside the box, he plays like a midfielder." Rafael van der Vaart said that Dele is "fast, fluid and has a great skill set", while future Everton manager Frank Lampard praised Dele's intelligence in his ability "to get into the box without being marked". He has, however, been widely accused of diving, and has received bookings for simulation.

=== Decline ===
In 2018, Dele was considered the world's most expensive midfielder from a transfer value perspective by the CIES. His form faded, however, in subsequent seasons, resulting in him losing his place in the England team in 2019 and becoming a fringe player for Tottenham Hotspur in the following years. In 2022, after Dele was loaned to Beşiktaş from Everton, Phil McNulty described his career trajectory as a "dramatic decline... from the golden boy of English football to lost talent". His decline was widely discussed by pundits and journalists, with explanations including loss of form, injuries, changes in role, and reduced confidence. Some commentators also questioned his application and consistency, though Dele later spoke publicly about personal difficulties during this period.

== Personal life ==
Dele was born in Milton Keynes, Buckinghamshire, to a Yoruba Nigerian father, Kehinde, and an English mother, Denise. Kehinde moved to the United States a week after Dele's birth. He was initially brought up by his mother, who suffered from alcohol problems. At the age of nine, he moved to Nigeria with his father, where he spent two years in an international school, before returning to Milton Keynes to live with his mother. Dele went to Stantonbury Campus and The Radcliffe School in Wolverton.

At the age of 13, he moved into the family home of Alan and Sally Hickford, parents of another footballer from MK Dons's youth system and whom he refers to as his "adoptive parents", although he was never legally adopted by them. In the summer of 2016, Alli announced that he would stop having his surname on match shirts, instead opting for "Dele", since he felt no connection with his biological father's family.

Dele was a Liverpool fan growing up with Steven Gerrard his childhood idol, seeing Gerrard and Frank Lampard as good role models for their professionalism. He is also a fan of British hip hop music, which led to the rapper Cadet releasing a single, "Advice", that references the footballer.

On 13 May 2020, Dele was held at knifepoint during a burglary by two men who broke into his house in north London. He was punched and suffered minor facial injuries. The burglars stole various pieces of jewelry, including watches.

In May 2021, he was spotted kissing Pep Guardiola's daughter Maria in Manchester. Dele was in a relationship with model Cindy Kimberly from June 2022 until 2025.

In July 2023, during an interview for Gary Neville's podcast The Overlap, Dele revealed that he had been sexually abused at the age of six, and had started dealing drugs at the age of eight. He also opened up about having spent a six-week spell in rehab following the end of his loan at Beşiktaş, because of an addiction to sleeping pills and mental health issues.

== Career statistics ==
=== Club ===
As of match played 15 March 2025

Appearances and goals by club, season and competition
Club	Season	League			National cup (Note: Includes FA Cup, Turkish Cup)		League cup (Note: Includes Football League/EFL Cup)		Europe		Other		Total	
Club	Season	Division	Apps	Goals	Apps	Goals	Apps	Goals	Apps	Goals	Apps	Goals	Apps	Goals
Milton Keynes Dons	2011–12	League One	0	0	0	0	0	0	—		0	0	0	0
Milton Keynes Dons	2012–13	League One	2	0	5	1	0	0	—		0	0	7	1
Milton Keynes Dons	2013–14	League One	33	6	1	0	2	0	—		1 (Note: Appearance in Football League Trophy)	1	37	7
Milton Keynes Dons	2014–15	League One	39	16	1	0	4	0	—		0	0	44	16
Milton Keynes Dons	Total		74	22	7	1	6	0	—		1	1	88	24
Tottenham Hotspur	2015–16	Premier League	33	10	3	0	1	0	9 (Note: Appearances in UEFA Europa League)	0	—		46	10
Tottenham Hotspur	2016–17	Premier League	37	18	5	3	0	0	8 (Note: Six appearances and one goal in UEFA Champions League, two appearances in UEFA Europa League)	1	—		50	22
Tottenham Hotspur	2017–18	Premier League	36	9	7	1	2	2	5 (Note: Appearances in UEFA Champions League)	2	—		50	14
Tottenham Hotspur	2018–19	Premier League	25	5	1	0	4	2	8	0	—		38	7
Tottenham Hotspur	2019–20	Premier League	25	8	5	0	1	0	7	1	—		38	9
Tottenham Hotspur	2020–21	Premier League	15	0	2	0	2	0	10	3	—		29	3
Tottenham Hotspur	2021–22	Premier League	10	1	1	0	2	0	5 (Note: Appearances in UEFA Europa Conference League)	1	—		18	2
Tottenham Hotspur	Total		181	51	24	4	12	4	52	8	—		269	67
Everton	2021–22	Premier League	11	0	—		—		—		—		11	0
Everton	2022–23	Premier League	2	0	—		0	0	—		—		2	0
Everton	2023–24	Premier League	0	0	0	0	0	0	—		—		0	0
Everton	Total		13	0	0	0	0	0	—		—		13	0
Beşiktaş (loan)	2022–23	Süper Lig	13	2	2	1	—		—		—		15	3
Como	2024–25	Serie A	1	0	—		—		—		—		1	0
Career total			282	75	33	6	18	4	52	8	1	1	386	94

=== International ===
As of match played 9 June 2019

Appearances and goals by national team and year
National team	Year	Apps	Goals
England	2015	4	1
England	2016	11	1
England	2017	7	0
England	2018	11	1
England	2019	4	0
Total		37	3

As of match played 9 June 2019. England score listed first, score column indicates score after each Dele goal.

List of international goals scored by Dele Alli
No.	Date	Venue	Cap	Opponent	Score	Result	Competition	Ref.
1	17 November 2015	Wembley Stadium, London, England	4	France	1–0	2–0	Friendly	
2	8 October 2016	Wembley Stadium, London, England	14	Malta	2–0	2–0	2018 FIFA World Cup qualification	
3	7 July 2018	Samara Arena, Samara, Russia	28	Sweden	2–0	2–0	2018 FIFA World Cup	

== Honours ==
Milton Keynes Dons

- Football League One runner-up: 2014–15

Tottenham Hotspur

- EFL Cup runner-up: 2020–21
- UEFA Champions League runner-up: 2018–19

England

- UEFA Nations League third place: 2018–19

Individual

- Milton Keynes Dons Young Player of the Year: 2013–14
- Football League Young Player of the Month: August 2014
- Football League One Player of the Month: January 2015
- Football League Young Player of the Year: 2014–15
- Milton Keynes Dons Player's Player of the Year: 2014–15
- BBC Goal of the Season: 2015–16
- PFA Young Player of the Year: 2015–16, 2016–17
- Premier League Player of the Month: January 2017
- PFA Team of the Year: 2014–15 League One, 2015–16 Premier League, 2016–17 Premier League
