= B Young =

British singer, rapper and songwriter

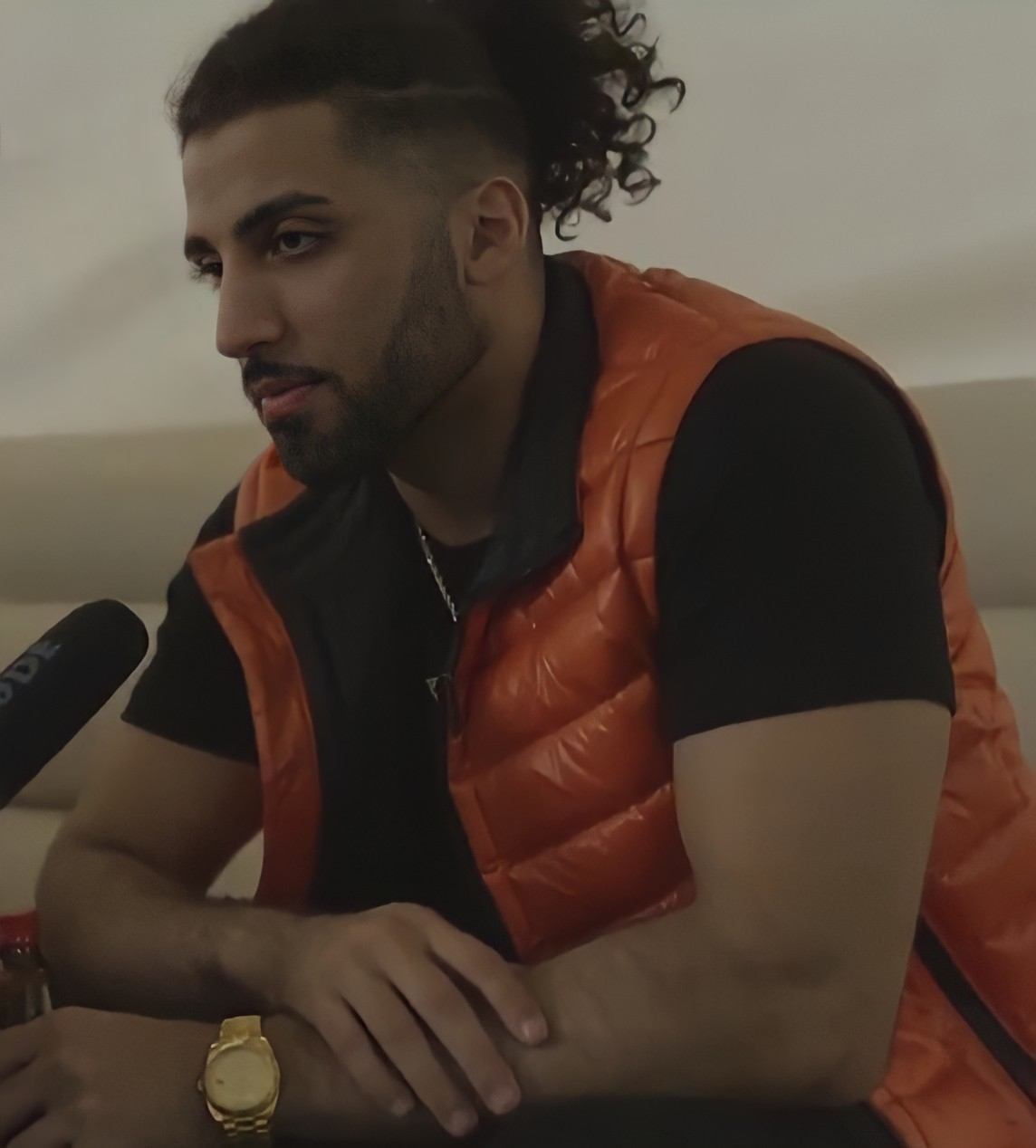
- B Young in 2019

Background information
- Born: Bertan Jafer; 12 January 1995 (age 31)
- Origin: Hackney, London, England
- Genres: Hip hop
- Occupations: Rapper; singer; songwriter
- Instrument: Vocals
- Years active: 2012–present
- Labels: Columbia; Sony Music Entertainment
- Website: www.byoungofficial.com

Bertan Jafer (born 12 January 1995), known professionally as B Young, is a British rapper and singer and songwriter from Hackney, London. Before becoming a rapper, B Young spent several years as a sound engineer during which he crafted his melodic rap sound. He is best known for his breakthrough single, "Jumanji", released via Columbia Records, which peaked at number 13 on the UK singles chart. Its follow-up, "079ME", peaked at number 23.

== Early life ==
Jafer was born in London to Turkish Cypriot parents.

== Career ==
=== 2017: Beginnings ===
On 10 March 2017 B Young released "London Boy", his debut single. He also remixed UK Rapper Dave's hit "Wanna Know" on 6 April 2017. Followed by his second single "Cash Flow", which he released on 7 May 2017.

On 25 August 2017, B Young released "Been Wavey". The song, which has racked up over 11 million views on YouTube, helped gain B Young traction and allowed Jumanji to reach the heights it did. In an interview with Capital XTRA, he said that he believed Been Wavey was better than Jumanji, and they are similar as they were recorded and created together.

=== 2018–present: Breakthrough ===
On 5 January 2018, B Young released his debut studio single "Jumanji", which entered the UK chart at number 64. It has since spent six weeks in the top 20, and twenty-four weeks in the top 100, peaking at number 13 in the UK charts and number 5 in the UK R&B charts. Later that year, he released "079ME" and "Juice", which both also entered the UK charts. 079ME peaked at number 23 in the UK charts, and number 12 in the UK R&B charts. It spent 16 weeks in the top 100. Juice reached number 96 in the UK charts.

In July 2019, B Young released Gucci Demon, which peaked at number 44 in the UK charts. Other than that, it was a quiet year for B Young, as he was barely active on any social media platforms and released just one single.

On 13 February 2020, B Young released "Wine". He has pledged to release music more often last year with an impending project looming. On 19 March 2020, he released "Want2". In August 2020, he released "Last Night" featuring Tion Wayne.

== Discography ==
=== Singles ===
Single	Year	Peak chart positions		Certifications
Single	Year	UK	UK R&B	Certifications
"Been Wavey"	2017	—	—	
"Jumanji"	2018	13	5	BPI: 2× Platinum
"079ME"	2018	23	12	BPI: Platinum
"Juice"	2018	96	—	
"Gucci Demon"	2019	44	—	BPI: Silver
"Wine"	2020	35	—	BPI: Silver
"Want2"	2020	99	—	
"Catch Me Outside"	2020	56	—	
"Last Night" (featuring Tion Wayne)	2020	68	—	
"808" (with Da Beatfreakz, DigDat, Dutchavelli)	2020	20	13	
"Ride for Me"	2021	62	—	BPI: Silver
"Come Alive hb."	2021	—	—	
"Justin Bieber"	2021	—	—	
"Anjani X" (with Ezu and Kumar Sanu)	2023	—	—	
"—" denotes a recording that did not chart or was not released in that territory.

=== Guest appearances ===
Title	Year	Artist(s)	Album
"Take the Lead"	2018	Chip	Ten10
"Movie"	2018	ADP	
"Bank"	2019	Collie Buddz	Hybrid
