= First Days =

First Days may refer to:

- "First Days" (Modern Family), an episode of Modern Family
- "First Days" (song), a song by Deno Driz
