= Cecile Emeke =

British filmmaker, writer and artist

Cecile Emeke (/əˈmiːkeɪ/ ə-MEE-kay) is a British filmmaker, writer and artist born in London of Jamaican and English descent. She is known for the online documentary series Strolling, as well as the short film turned web series Ackee & Saltfish. Emeke's work has been featured by press worldwide and she was selected as one of Broadcast magazine's 2015 Hot Shots.

== Career ==
In 2014 Emeke directed the short film Ackee & Saltfish. The film follows two friends, Olivia and Rachel (played by Michelle Tiwo and Vanessa Babirye), around East London as they are trying find the traditional Jamaican salted cod dish that gives the film its name. The short film was turned into a web series in February 2015.

In 2014 Emeke also published the first episode of the web series Strolling on YouTube. In the first iteration of the documentary series, Emeke walks around the streets of London with Black men and women to talk about a diverse range of issues such as sexuality, gender, identity, mental health, popular culture, and gentrification. Since launching the British version of Strolling, Emeke has applied the same concept to people pertaining to the black diaspora in other countries. In February 2015 she launched Flâner, which features French subjects in Paris talking about French slavery, policing, black French culture, and sexual expression. Later, in September 2015, Emeke launched the companion series Wandelen, which focuses on black Dutch people in Amsterdam and London talking about issues such as black Dutch culture, immigration, the tradition of Black Pete, mental health, and the racialization of Islam. In October of the same year she launched the Italian version of the same concept, passeggiando, which treated specific topics such as Italian colonial history, Italian citizenship, and misogynoir. November saw the publication of the American version of Strolling, which treats issues specific to black America including mixed privilege, hypervisibility, and black American culture. The series is no longer available on YouTube and Emeke's account no longer exists.

In October 2014, Emeke published Fake Deep, a poem written by the artist and performed by Michelle Tiwo, Emma Carryl, Stephanie Levi-John, Naomi Ackie, Nneka Okoye and Modupe Salu. In June 2015, Emeke published a short film entitled Lines about the songs and lyrics most meaningful to her interview subjects. In both films, Emeke explores issues of feminism in the black diaspora.

Emeke was a director in season one of Issa Rae's Insecure (TV series). She also worked with Idris Elba as a director for the British television series In the Long Run.
