= DigDat =

British rapper

- Born: Nathan Tokosi; 10 November 1999 (age 26); Deptford, London, England
- Genres: British hip hop; UK drill
- Occupations: Rapper; songwriter
- Years active: 2018–2026
- Labels: Columbia; Sony Music; Independent
- Website: digdat8.com

DigDat
- Status: Incarcerated
- Criminal charges: Attempted murder, Firearms offences
- Penalty: Life in prison, minimum term of 24 years

Nathan Tokosi (born 10 November 1999), known professionally as DigDat, is a British rapper and convicted criminal from Deptford, London. His single "Air Force" peaked at number 20 on the UK Singles Chart following the release of the remix featuring Krept and Konan and K-Trap; this was the first time one of his tracks had entered the top 20. His next single, "No Cap" with Loski, peaked at number 51.

On 27 January 2026, Tokosi was sentenced to life with a minimum term of 24 years for the attempted murder of Daniel Offei-Ntow, who died in January 2026 from circumstances unrelated to the shooting.

== Career ==
=== 2018–2020: Beginnings and Ei8ht Mile ===
Tokosi began rapping in 2018, under the name "DigDat". He gained recognition with his single "Air Force", which entered the UK Singles Chart at number 93 in September 2018. A remix of the track with features from Krept and Konan and K Trap was released in the following months; the track then peaked at number 20 in December 2018.

He released his debut album, Ei8ht Mile, on 17 January 2020, including features from K Trap, D-Block Europe, Tee Grizzley, Aitch, and others. It peaked at number 12 on the UK Albums Chart.

=== 2020–2022: Pain Built ===
In 2020, DigDat appeared on "808" by Da Beatfreakz, which also featured Dutchavelli and B Young. It peaked at number 20 on the UK Singles Chart. In 2021, he released "How High", which peaked at number 90.

In December 2021, DigDat announced Pain Built; it was released on 14 January 2022. A review of the mixtape by GRM Daily said the mixtape "feels as if it is a step in the right direction for both DigDat and UK drill."

== Legal issues ==
At the age of 13, Tokosi was sentenced to 10 years in prison. He was released in 2018 after serving 4 years.

In February 2024, Tokosi was arrested and charged with attempted murder, possessing a firearm with intent to endanger life/enable an other to do so, and possession of three 9mm Parabellum calibre bullets for a firearm in relation to a shooting that had occurred in Notting Hill in November 2023. The shooting resulted in Daniel Offei-Ntow being shot eight times in his head, mouth and body. He was convicted of possessing a firearm and possessing ammunition, both with intent to endanger life, as well as possessing a prohibited weapon and possession of ammunition without a firearms certificate in March 2025.

In November 2025, Tokosi was found not guilty of possession of a firearm with intent to endanger life at the Old Bailey Crown Court. However he was found guilty of simple possession of a firearm (and ammunition). This is related to an incident where a gun was thrown out of a window by a passenger in a BMW DigDat was driving through Deptford, South-East London. This comes after the ‘Air Force’ star was found guilty of attempted murder of another man who goes by the name Lugavellz. Due to legal reasons DigDat is able to appeal his attempted murder conviction and could become a free man if he is successful.

On 27 January 2026, Tokosi was sentenced to life with a minimum term of 24 years for the attempted murder of Daniel Offei-Ntow, who died in January 2026 from circumstances unrelated to the shooting.

== Discography ==
=== Mixtapes ===
List of mixtapes, with selected details and peak chart positions
Title	Details	Peak chart positions		
Title	Details	UK	UK R&B	IRE
Ei8ht Mile	Released: 17 January 2020; Label: Sony; Format: digital download, streaming	12	13	63
Pain Built	Released: 14 January 2022; Label: Sony; Format: digital download, streaming	—	—	—
"—" denotes a recording that did not chart or was not released in that territory.

=== Singles ===
==== As lead artist ====
List of singles, with year released, selected chart positions and certifications
Title	Year	Peak chart positions			Certifications	Album
Title	Year	UK	UK R&B/HH	IRE	Certifications	Album
"Sales & Joints"	2018	—	—	—		Non-album singles
"8Style"	2018	—	—	—		Non-album singles
"Tactics"	2018	—	—	—		Non-album singles
"Air Force" (solo or featuring K-Trap and Krept & Konan)	2018	20	6	—	BPI: Gold	Non-album singles
"No Cap" (with Loski)	2019	51	26	—		Mad Move
"Guten Tag" (with Hardy Caprio)	2019	18	6	71	BPI: Platinum	Non-album single
"New Dior" (featuring D-Block Europe)	2019	16	8	—	BPI: Gold	Ei8ht Mile
"Daily Duppy" (with GRM Daily)	2019	—	—	—		Non-album single
"8 Style II"	2020	71	—	—		Ei8ht Mile
"Ei8ht Mile" (featuring Aitch)	2020	9	7	34	BPI: Silver	Ei8ht Mile
"Assassin Creed"	2020	—	—	—		Pain Built
"VV"	2020	—	—	—		Pain Built
"How High"	2021	90	—	—		Pain Built
"Life Support"	2022	—	—	—		Non-album singles
"Bentayga"	2022	—	—	—		Non-album singles
"No Gimmicks"	2023	—	—	—		Non-album singles
"So Much Trappin'" (featuring Bookey)	2023	—	—	—		Non-album singles
"Pink Notes"	2024	—	—	—		Non-album singles
"—" denotes a recording that did not chart or was not released in that territory.

==== As featured artist ====
List of singles, with year released, selected chart positions and certifications
Title	Year	Peak chart positions			Album
Title	Year	UK	UK R&B/HH	IRE	Album
"Friday" (Kenny Allstar featuring DigDat)	2019	62	38	—	Non-album single
"Change" (Deno featuring DigDat)	2019	53	35	—	Eye 2 Eye
"F.N (UK Remix)" (Lil Tjay featuring DigDat)	2019	—	—	—	Non-album singles
"808" (Da Beatfreakz featuring DigDat, Dutchavelli and B Young)	2020	20	13	64	Non-album singles
"—" denotes a recording that did not chart or was not released in that territory.

=== Guest appearances ===
List of non-single guest appearances, with other performing artists, showing year released and album name
Title	Year	Other artist(s)	Album
"Back 2 Back"	2018	Headie One	The One Two
"Mosh Pit"	2019	Headie One, Rv	Drillers x Trappers II
"Pay Less"	2019	Bouncer, Swift	The Come Up
