= The Commitment (EP) =

EP by Cadet
- Released: 19 February 2016
- Recorded: 2015–16
- Genre: Hip hop
- Length: 24:15
- Label: Underrated Legends

Cadet chronology
The Commitment (2016)	The Commitment 2 (2017)

The Commitment is the debut extended play by English rapper Cadet. It was released on 19 February 2016 via digital download. The EP has features from Donae'o, Konan and Tis Rome.

== Background ==
The Commitment EP was the first commercial release by the rapper. In the EP, Cadet describes stories of his life but claims he is no story-teller and these aren’t some made up tales relaid for the listeners' enjoyment. Link Up TV described it as an EP where Cadet shows his rare ability to paint some of the clearest pictures. The Beat FM described the EP as an "album that puts Cadet's smart wordplay and style up there with some of the great's".

== Track listing ==
No.	Title	Length
1.	"The Commitment" (Intro)	2:40
2.	"From the Road" (featuring Tis Rome)	4:56
3.	"No Way" (featuring Donae'o)	3:45
4.	"Gipset Flow (Interlude)" (featuring Konan)	1:25
5.	"Gipset Flow"	3:17
6.	"Wanna Know Why"	2:27
7.	"The Stereotype"	5:45
Total length:		24:15

== Personnel ==
Credits for The Commitment adapted from AllMusic.

- Cadet - Primary Artist
- Donae'o - Featured Artist, Vocals
- Tisrome - Featured Artist, Vocals
