= Hybrid (Collie Buddz album) =

Studio album by Collie Buddz
- Released: May 24, 2019
- Recorded: 2018–19
- Genre: Hip-hop; dancehall
- Label: Harper Digital
- Producer: Collie Buddz; Johnny Cosmic

Collie Buddz chronology
Good Life (2017)	Hybrid (2019)	Take It Easy (2023)

Singles from Hybrid
- 1. "Legal Now" Released: April 20, 2018; 2. "Love & Reggae" Released: June 22, 2018; 3. "Bounce It" Released: January 25, 2019; 4. "Bank" Released: April 5, 2019; 5. "Show Love" Released: May 14, 2019

Hybrid is the third studio album by Bermudian dancehall artist Collie Buddz. It was released on May 24, 2019, via Harper Digital Entertainment. It features guest appearances from Russ, B Young, Dizzy Wright, Johnny Cosmic, Stonebwoy and Tech N9NE. The album peaked at number 1 on the US Billboard Reggae Albums chart and number 20 on the Independent Albums chart. It spawned five singles: "Legal Now", "Love & Reggae", "Bounce It", "Bank" and "Show Love".

== Track listing ==
No.	Title	Writer(s)	Length
1.	"Bank" (featuring B Young and Russ)	C. Harper; B. Jafer; R. Vitale	3:23
2.	"Love & Reggae"	C. Harper; A. Reid	3:33
3.	"Legal Now"	C. Harper	3:15
4.	"Bounce It" (featuring Stonebwoy)	C. Harper; L. Etse Satekla	3:08
5.	"Show Love"	C. Harper	3:12
6.	"Callaloo" (featuring Dizzy Wright)	C. Harper; L. Wright	2:57
7.	"The Feeling" (featuring Johnny Cosmic)	C. Harper; J. Cosmic	3:32
8.	"Everything Blessed" (featuring Tech N9NE)	C. Harper; A. Yates	2:29
9.	"Love Is life"	C. Harper	2:35
10.	"Time Flies" (featuring Russ)	C. Harper; R. Vitale	3:26

== Personnel ==
- Colin "Collie Buddz" Harper – vocals, songwriter, producer, executive producer
- Russell "Russ" Vitale – vocals & songwriter (tracks: 1, 10)
- Bertan "B Young" Jafer – vocals & songwriter (track 1)
- Livingstone Etse Satekla – vocals & songwriter (track 4)
- La'Reonte Wright – vocals & songwriter (track 6)
- Aaron Dontez Yates – vocals & songwriter (track 8)
- Syreeta Archie – backing vocals (track 2)
- Andrew Mcintyre – guitar (tracks: 2, 5, 10)
- Johnny Cosmic – guitar (tracks: 5, 10), songwriter (track 7), producer (tracks: 7, 9)
- Shawn Mitchell – bass (tracks: 2, 5, 10)
- Raymond Stewart – keyboards (tracks: 5, 10)
- Marvelon Mitchell – drums (track 2)
- Niko Marzouca – mixing (tracks: 1–5, 7–10)
- Robert Marks – mixing (tracks: 1–5, 7–10)
- Migui Maloles – mixing (track 6)
- Dave Fore – mastering
- Igor Katz – executive producer

== Chart history ==
Chart (2019)	Peak position
US Reggae Albums (Billboard)	1
US Top Album Sales (Billboard)	79
US Independent Albums (Billboard)	20
