= Advice (song) =

2018 single by Cadet and Deno

Single by Cadet & Deno Driz

from the album The Rated Legend
- Released: 29 August 2018
- Genre: Afroswing Hip hop
- Length: 3:12
- Label: Underrated Legends; Fukm
- Songwriter(s): Blaine Cameron Johnson; Deno

Cadet singles chronology
"Closure" (2018)	"Advice" (2018)	"Pumpy" (2018)

Deno singles chronology
"Advice" (2018)	"Pumpy" (2018)

"Advice" is a song by English rapper Cadet and English singer Deno, released on 28 August 2018. The song peaked at number 14 on the UK Singles Chart in February 2019 following Cadet's death; it had previously reached number one on the UK Independent Singles Breakers Chart in September 2018. The song has since amassed over 30 million views on YouTube. The song mentions English footballer Dele Alli where the two rappers are seen depicting the Dele Alli signature celebration in the album art. The song was included on Cadet's posthumous debut album The Rated Legend, released on 10 April 2020.

== Charts ==
=== Weekly charts ===
Chart (2018–2019)	Peak position
Ireland (IRMA)	95
UK Singles (Official Charts Company)	14
UK Indie (OCC)	1

=== Year-end charts ===
Chart (2019)	Position
UK Singles (Official Charts Company)	89
