= Collie Buddz =

Bermudian reggae singer (born 1981)

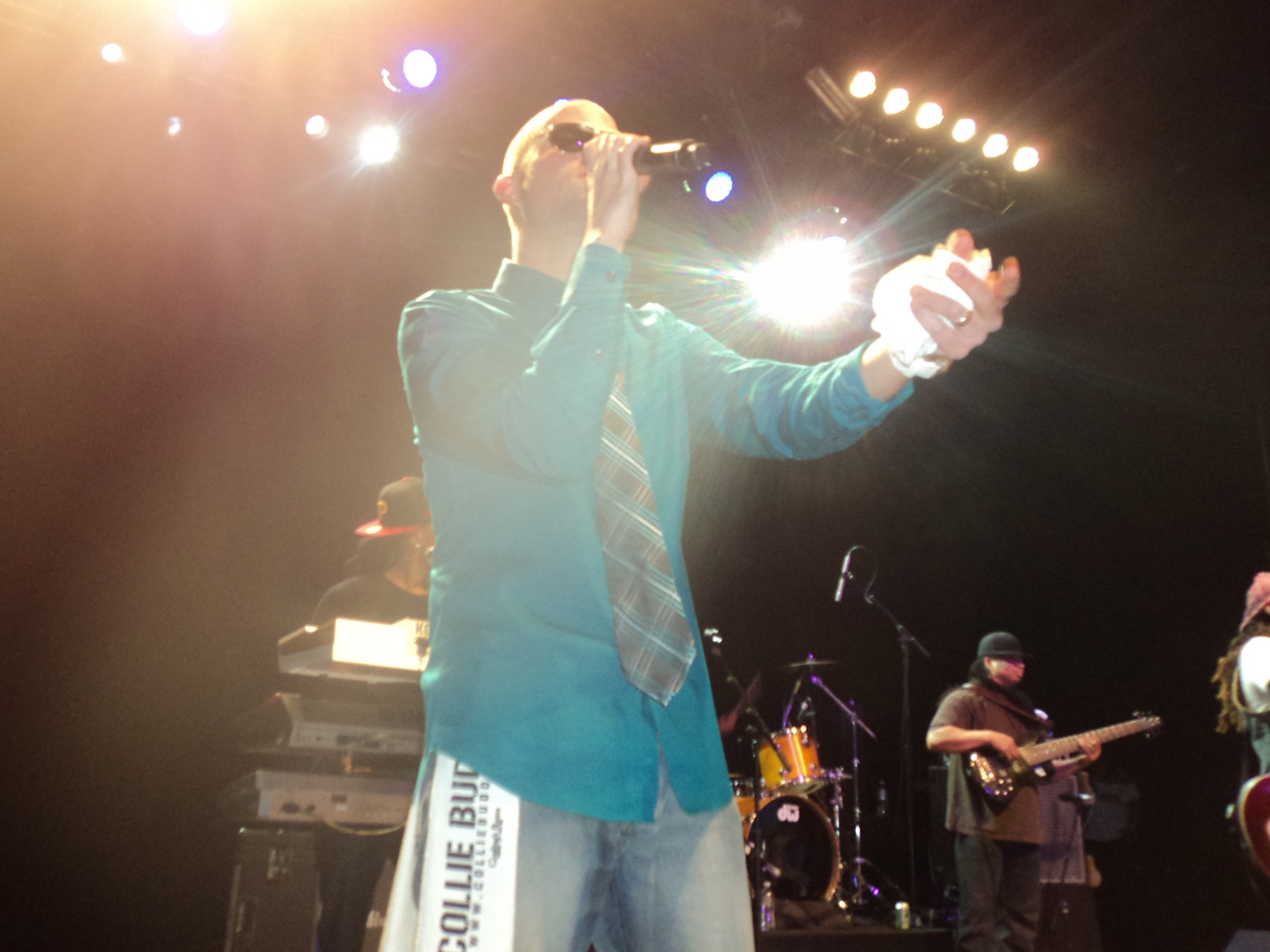
- Collie Buddz performing at the Sound Academy in 2012

Background information
- Born: Colin Patrick Harper; August 21, 1981 (age 44); New Orleans, Louisiana, U.S.
- Origin: Bermuda
- Genres: Dancehall, reggae, reggae fusion, soca
- Years active: 2006–present
- Labels: Harper Digital; Sony; Columbia
- Website: www.colliebuddz.com

Colin Patrick Harper (born August 21, 1981), better known by his stage name Collie Buddz, is a Bermudian reggae singer. He signed with Columbia Records to release his self-titled debut studio album (2006), which entered the Billboard 200 and contained the singles "Come Around" and "Mamacita".

== Career ==
Harper was born in New Orleans, Louisiana to a Bermudian mother and he was raised in Bermuda. He studied audio engineering at Full Sail University in Winter Park, Florida. His name is based on slang for cannabis.

Buddz performed on Shaggy's 2007 studio album Intoxication on the track "Mad Mad World".

=== Self-titled album (2007) ===
On June 7, 2007, he released his debut self-titled album on Columbia and Sony BMG. It included his first single "Come Around" and second single "Blind To You". However, his greatest radio success was "Mamacita", which boasted sales of approximately 4 million copies thanks to this hit single.

Buddz is well known for his 2007 hit "Blind to You" and performing the song on stage with a guest from the audience who he calls on stage to sing the "Third Verse". One of his more memorable on-stage guests was a man he dubbed "Big Jerry," whom he brought on stage during Cali Roots X.

After his debut album, Buddz launched his own record label, Harper Digital Entertainment.

=== Touring and EP's (2008–2015) ===
In 2008, he performed his song "S.O.S." on WWE The Music, Vol. 8 as the entrance theme for wrestler Kofi Kingston. He also appeared in a 2009 remix of Kid Cudi's single "Day 'n' Nite".

Buddz released his first EP, Playback on July 12, 2012. It featured eight tracks with different producers such as Baby Dee Beats, Green Lion, Homegrown Kush, Seani B, Star Kutt, Supa Dups, and TJ Records.

In 2013, he was a featured act with Rebelution, Matisyahu, and Zion Thompson of The Green on the Good Vibes Tour. Buddz' festival appearances include Lollapalooza, Outside Lands, Hot 97 Summer Jam, Reggae on the Rocks, California Roots Music and Arts Festival, UCLA JazzReggae, Seattle City Arts festival, Manifestivus, and the Marley Family's 9 Mile Music Festival, among others.

Buddz released his second EP, Blue Dreamz on September 4, 2015, which featured seven new tracks.

=== Good Life (2017) and Hybrid (2019) ===
He released his second studio LP album Good Life on May 19, 2017 via Harper Digital Entertainment. It features guest appearances from Snoop Dogg, Jody Highroller (AKA Riff Raff), Kat Dahlia, Kreesha Turner, and P-Lo. The album peaked at #1 on the US Billboard Reggae Albums chart and #29 on the Independent Albums chart.

His third studio album Hybrid with 10-tracks, which released on May 24, 2019 via Harper Digital and Ineffable Records. The album topped the Billboard reggae albums chart, #70 on the Billboard 200 and #20 on the Independent Albums chart. The album features special guests, B Young, Dizzy Wright, Johnny Cosmic, Russ, Stonebwoy and Tech N9ne.

=== Cali Roots Riddim albums ===
Buddz released his own Riddim album, Cali Roots Riddim 2020 on May 22, 2020. He produced all 22 tracks and worked with Stick Figure guitarist and reggae artist/producer Johnny Cosmic who mixed and also produced the tracks. The compilation made it to #7 on Billboard Reggae Albums chart. The album features one riddim or rhythm that includes the top reggae rock artists' performing their interpretation of it, including Collie Buddz himself. Some of the bands featured are Arise Roots, Bumpin Uglies, Common Kings, The Elovaters, The Expendables, Giant Panda Guerilla Dub Squad, Iya Terra, Mike Love, The Movement, Ozomatli, Pepper, SOJA, and Yellowman, among others.

He released another riddim compilation, Cali Roots Riddim 2021 on May 28, 2021 with 27 tracks; once again mixed and additional produced by Johnny Cosmic. It features top reggae/rock bands such as Alborosie, Atmosphere, Ballyhoo!, The Expanders, Groundation, Iration, Josh Heinrichs, KBong, New Kingston, Passafire, Through The Roots, Tropidelic, and many more.

After taking a year off, Buddz continued his Cali Roots Riddim album in 2023. The 23-track album was released on June 30th and features reggae rock artists Anthony B, Busy Signal, The Expendables, Fiji, Iya Terra & Dub Inc., J Boog & The Green, Mike Love, Luciano, Mahali, SOJA, Little Stranger, The Movement, Shwayze, and more.

=== Take It Easy (2023) ===
It was announced on Collie Buddz social media pages that his fourth studio album titled, Take It Easy will be released on Ineffable Records on September 29, 2023. The album was nominated for ‘Best Reggae Album’ at the 2025 Grammy Awards.

== Other projects ==
In the summer of 2021, Collie Buddz teamed up with Pablo Robles of Wine Boss to make a limited run bottle of rosé called, "Love and Rosé." It's made from Petit Verdot and Muscat grapes with stone fruit and sweet honeysuckle.

== Lineup ==
=== Current tour band members ===
- Collie Buddz – lead singer/songwriter, producer
- Jason "J-Vibe" Farmer – keyboard, producer
- Shawn "Mista Roots" Mitchell – bass
- Ronny Gutierrez – guitar
- Brian Williamson - drums

== Discography ==
=== Studio albums ===
Chart History
Year	Album	Label	Billboard 200	US Indie	US R&B	US Rap	US Reggae
2007	Collie Buddz	Columbia/Sony BMG	68	—	15	7	1
2017	Good Life	Harper Digital Entertainment	—	29	—	—	1
2019	Hybrid	Harper Digital	79	20	—	—	1
2023	Take It Easy	Ineffable Records/Harper Digital	—	—	—	—	—

=== Extended plays (EPs) ===
Chart History
Year	Album	Label	Billboard US Reggae
2011	Playback EP	Harper Digital	—
2015	Blue Dreamz EP	Harper Digital	3

=== Compilations (Riddims) ===
Chart History
Year	Album	Label	Billboard US Reggae
2020	Cali Roots Riddim 2020	Harper Digital	7
2021	Cali Roots Riddim 2021	Harper Digital	TBD
2023	Cali Roots Riddim 2023	Ineffable Records	

=== Promos (Mixtapes) ===
Chart History
Year	Album	Label	Billboard peak
2007	420 Mixtape	Harper Digital Entertainment	—
2009	On The Rock	Harper Digital Entertainment	—
2010	The Last Toke	Harper Digital Entertainment	—

=== Singles ===
Title	Release date	Album
"Come Around"	2007	Collie Buddz
"Blind To You"	2007	Collie Buddz
"Mamacita"	2007	Collie Buddz
"Tomorrow's Another Day"	2007	Collie Buddz
"What A Feeling" (feat. Paul Wall)	2007	Collie Buddz
"Sensimilla" (feat. Roache)	2007	Collie Buddz
"Defend Your Own"	2007	Collie Buddz
"Love Deh"	2007	Collie Buddz
"Movin' On"	2007	Collie Buddz
"Wild Out"	2007	Collie Buddz
"My Everything"	2007	Collie Buddz
"Lonely" (feat. Yung Berg)	2007	Collie Buddz
"Let Me Know It"	2007	Collie Buddz
"The First Time"	2007	Collie Buddz
"Defend Your Own" (feat. Krayzie Bone)	2007	Collie Buddz
"Blind To You"	2007	Collie Buddz
"Hustle"	2007	Collie Buddz
"B-E-R-M-U-D-A"	2007	420 Mixtape
"Come Around" (feat. Shaggy)	2007	420 Mixtape
"S.O.S."	2008	WWE The Music, Volume 8
"She Gimme Love"	2008	I Love Ragga (Single)
"Eyez"	January 1, 2009	(Single)
"Herb Tree"	January 14, 2009	On The Rock (Mixtape)
"Fly Away" (with Machel Montano)	2009	(Single) (song on Heavenly Drum by Michael Montano)
"Par Wid I Mon"	March 6, 2009	(Single)
"Mary Jane"	2010	The Last Toke (Mixtape)
"Private Show"	2010	The Last Toke (Mixtape)
"Serious"	2010	The Last Toke (Mixtape)
"Now She's Gone"	2010	The Last Toke (Mixtape)
"Phone Call"	2010	The Last Toke (Mixtape)
"Young Girl"	2010	The Last Toke (Mixtape)
"Not For No Chain"	2010	The Last Toke (Mixtape)
"Never Good Enough" (feat. Major Lazer & Lindi Ortega)	November 3, 2010	(Single)
"Kush" (Collie Buddz Remix) (Dr. Dre feat. Snoop Dogg & Akon)	December 13, 2010	(Single)
"Start It Up" (Remix)	December 24, 2010	(Single)
"Holiday"	2011	Playback EP
"Come Down"	2011	Playback EP
"Playback"	2011	Playback EP
"On My Way Back Home" (feat. Sean Paul)	2011	Playback EP
"I Feel So Good"	2011	Playback EP
"Hope" (feat. Demarco)	2011	Playback EP
"Won't Be Long"	2012	(Single)
"Nuh Easy"	2012	Sweety & Nuh Easy (Single)
"No Time"	2012	Cornershop Riddim (Single)
"Ganja Pipe"	September 6, 2012	(Single)
"Payback's A B**ch"	2013	(Single)
"My Yout" (with Joey Bada$$)	2013	(Single) (song on Summer Kings by Joey Bada$$)
"Smoke the Weed" (with Snoop Lion)	2013	(Single) (song on Reincarnated by Snoop Dogg)
"Light It Up"	October 19, 2013	(Single)
"Prescription"	2015	Blue Dreamz EP
"Go Hard"	2015	Blue Dreamz EP
"It Nice" (Produced by Jr Blender)	July 8, 2015	(Single)
"Wake & Bake" (with Iamsu! & Berner)	October 5, 2015	(Single)
"Yesterday" (feat. Jody Highroller & Snoop Dogg)	July 10, 2017	(Single)
"Good Life"	2017	Good Life
"Control"	2017	Good Life
"Save Me From The Rain" (feat. Kat Dahlia)	2017	Good Life
"Part of My Life"	2017	Good Life
"Used To" (feat. Kreesha Turner)	2017	Good Life
"Level" (feat. P-Lo)	2017	Good Life
"Legal Now"	April 20, 2018	(Single)
"Love & Reggae"	2019	Hybrid
"Bounce It" (feat. Stonebwoy)	2019	Hybrid
"The Feeling" (feat. Johnny Cosmic)	2019	Hybrid
"Show Love"	2019	Hybrid
"Callaloo" (feat. Dizzy Wright)	2019	Hybrid
"Legal Now"	2019	Hybrid
"Bank" (feat. B Young & Russ)	2019	Hybrid
"Love Is Life"	2019	Hybrid
"Time Flies" (feat. Russ)	2019	Hybrid
"Everything Blessed" (feat. Tech N9ne)	2019	Hybrid
"Chill Out" (feat. Anthony B)	May 22, 2020	Cali Roots Riddim 2020 (Single)
"Hold Firm"	May 22, 2020	Cali Roots Riddim 2020 (Single)
"Brighter Days"	June 12, 2020	(Single)
"Deh Yah" (with Gyptian & Ricky Blaze)	September 11, 2020	(Single)
"Planter's Paradise" (with Kamrun)	November 13, 2020	(Single)
"Close To You"	December 4, 2020	(Single)
"Sun and the Moon" (with Johnny Cosmic)	January 22, 2021	(Single)
"Twisted Agenda" (feat. Bounty Killer)	January 28, 2022	(Single)
"Take It Easy"	February 3, 2023	Take It Easy (Single)
