= Closure (Cadet song) =

Single by Cadet
- Released: 13 April 2018
- Genre: Hip hop
- Length: 7:06
- Label: Underrated Legends; Fukm
- Songwriters: Blaine Cameron Johnson; Deno Driz

Cadet singles chronology
"Closure" (2018)	"Advice" (2018)

"Closure" is the debut single by English rapper Cadet, released on 13 April 2018. The song peaked at number 74 on the UK Singles Chart. It has since amassed over 10 million views on YouTube.

== Track listing ==
Digital download
No.	Title	Length
1.	"Closure"	7:06

== Charts ==
Chart (2018–19)	Peak position
UK Singles (Official Charts Company)	74
