= Shocka =

British rapper and mental health activist (born 1988)

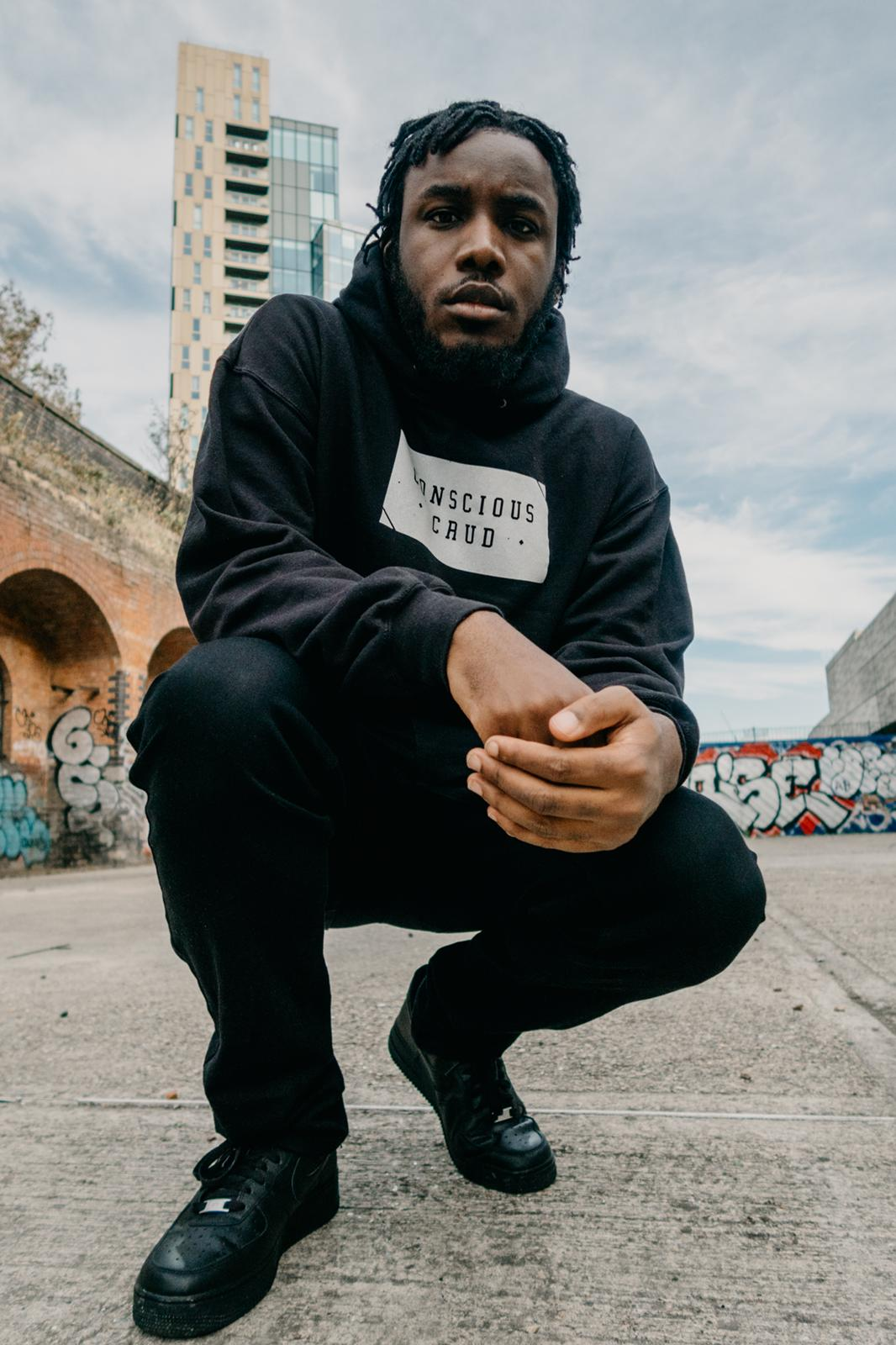

Background information
- Born: Kenneth Erhahon; July 8, 1988 (age 37)
- Origin: Tottenham, London, United Kingdom
- Genres: Grime; hip hop
- Occupations: Rapper, mental health advocate
- Years active: 2008—2011; 2014—present

Kenneth Erhahon (born 8 July 1988), better known by his stage name Shocka, is a rapper and mental health advocate from Tottenham, London. He gained recognition for being one/third of Grime collective Marvell alongside Double S and Vertex. After dealing with mental health issues himself, Shocka became a Mental health advocate to help those with their own problems with his music. He has since aimed to raise awareness of mental issues and has been a speaker on TED and a guest on numerous talk shows.

== Life and career ==
=== 2008-2011: Career beginnings and Marvell ===
Shocka was born and raised in Broadwater Farm in Tottenham, North London. He experienced a lot of things whilst growing up there including crime and poverty, and wishes to shine a positive light on an area that has seen so much negativity. He began his musical journey in 2008, when he released his first mixtape "Beast on the Loose" which led him in joining the Grime group Marvell, alongside Vertex and Double S. Marvell were noted for being one of the first UK rap group to adopt of the direct-to-fan mentality that most musicians have now accepted; they released numerous mixtapes for free via their own blog, which was consistently updated with singles including Tim Westwood freestyles to studio encounters with Drake and Rihanna. The BBC named Marvell as "Hot for 2010" alongside Tinie Tempah, Chip, Skepta and Diversity. During this time, Shocka also worked with Ghetts' Grime collective "The Movement", alongside Devlin, Wretch 32, and Scorcher. Marvell were eventually signed by Grime label Risky Roadz in 2011. However, the debut single by Marvell didn't perform as expected, and Risky Roadz later dropped Marvell. This eventually led Shocka to cope with mental health issues.

=== 2012-2017: Mental health issues and solo career ===
After being dropped, Shocka felt that the highs of being a musician had been taken from him in an instant, which sent him on a downward spiral. This became too much for him to cope and he ended up in a mental health hospital. Shocka, however, returned to music in 2014 with Fire in the Booth with Double S. He began his solo career in 2015. He released his debut warm-up session with SB.TV in March 2019. In the freestyle he talks about his future, getting married and one day starting a family. The artist also reflects on his life as he approaches turning 30. This was followed by the single "My Revolution which was released on 27 April 2015 and featured a cameo appearance from Russell Brand. He was enlisted on Joey Clipstar's "Hardest Bars" series on Season 8 Episode 5 alongside Stormzy and Cashtastic. Shocka teamed up with Marvell affiliate Double S, after 6 long years since making music together, to release the single "One Take" which was released on 2 February 2016. He again made it on Clipstar's "Hardest Bars" but this time on Episode 12. He released the single "1 God" on 20 April 2016. Over a freestyle to Cadet's "Letter To Krept", Shocka wrote his own "Letter To Marvell", his former crew, directly addressing a long-rumoured situation involving his fellow ex-teammates Vertex and Double S. The freestyle was released 16 September 2016. Shocka went viral after releasing a freestyle titled "Now" in light of the Grenfell Tower fire. The freestyle was reposted by British musicians including Giggs.

He released the EP "Kenneth is a King" which looks at he's life follow him on his rise to stardom from an introspective view. His return to music has been labelled as conscious, affirmative music inspired by Kendrick & J. Cole. Shocka aims to provide a positive message of Self Love in his music and promotes the message of putting yourself first from his experiences.

=== 2018-present: Mental Health advocacy and Impact over Numbers ===
He released a solo Fire in the Booth on 27 January 2018. He released the single "Self Love" on October of the same year.

On 26 November 2018, Shocka was featured on a podcast by Roundhouse where he gave his guidance and support to aspiring musicians on how to cope with mental health from the industry, discussing his time as an upcoming artist which lead him to experience a mental health breakdown. In an early 2019 interview with ITV News, Erhanon highlighted the highs and extreme lows of showbusiness. He spoke about his journey from being alongside famous names like Skepta to being dropped by his record company. Shocka was involved in an interview with The Pit LDN on 27 March 2019 to further raise awareness of mental health associated with music. Shocka released his third EP Conscious Crud on 26 April 2019.

Shocka was a speaker in the 2019 TEDxLondon Beyond Borders event held on 18 May 2019. During his talk, he highlighted his personal journey with mental health issues and how he has come to terms with these difficulties. Shocka believes self-love is part of the cure for mental health issues, such as depression, anxiety and low self-image.

In September 2019, Shocka reached out to Stefflon Don for cancer treatment for his mother. Stefflon Don held a giveaway after reaching a billion streams, and decided to give the money for his mother's treatment.

Erhanon went on to feature in a 10-episode series called "Mind Yourself" produced by Barcroft Studios. It focuses on young people who have or are recovering from poor mental health and was released on February 14, 2020, via Snapchat whilst also highlighting his own battle with schizophrenia and anxiety disorder.

Shocka released his debut album Impact Over Numbers on 16 May 2020. It features Burna Boy on the intro, production from Ayo Beatz, and vocals from Brook Baili and Chrissy Day as well as a tribute single to the late rapper, Cadet. The album was noted for exploring a variety of topics including mental health, friendship, and miscarriage.

== Discography ==
=== Studio albums ===
- 2020: Impact Over Numbers
- 2026: CONSCIOUS Grime

=== EPs ===
- 2016: Against the Grain
- 2017: Kenneth is a King
- 2019: Conscious Crud

=== With Marvell ===
2014: Marvell FM 5

=== Singles ===
==== As featured artist ====
Title	Year	Peak chart positions		Album
Title	Year	UK	UK R&B	Album
"Maybe Ting Refix" (Ozzie B featuring Lip E, Double S, Shocka, Flirta D, Lethal Bizzle, Jme and Frisco)	2010	182	—	Non-album single
