= The Commitment 2 =

EP by Cadet
- Released: 21 July 2017
- Recorded: 2016–17
- Genre: Hip hop
- Length: 33:33
- Label: Underrated Legends

Cadet chronology
The Commitment (2016)	The Commitment 2 (2017)	The Rated Legend (2020)

The Commitment 2 is the second and final extended play by English rapper Cadet. It was released on 21 July 2017 via digital download. The EP has features from Konan, Ghetts, Sangeet, and Shakka.

== Track listing ==
No.	Title	Length
1.	"Meek Mill"	3:58
2.	"Friday to Sunday" (featuring Shakka)	3:38
3.	"Invest"	3:02
4.	"Little Bro"	2:37
5.	"Instagram Girls" (featuring Krept and Konan)	4:00
6.	"Don't Take It Personal" (featuring Ghetts)	3:06
7.	"Words from RA"	1:32
8.	"Gipset Flow Pt. 2"	3:15
9.	"No More Letters"	3:22
10.	"Not Now" (featuring Sangeet) (bonus track)	5:03
Total length:		33:33

== Personnel ==
Credits for the Commitment 2 adapted from AllMusic.

- Cadet - Primary Artist
- Ghetts - Featured Artist, Rap
- Konan - Choir/Chorus, Featured Artist, Vocals (Background)
- Sangeet - Choir/Chorus, Featured Artist, Vocals (Background)
- Shakka - Choir/Chorus, Featured Artist, Vocals
