= Ambush Buzzworl =

British rapper

- Born: 3 January 1994 (age 32); Camden, London, England
- Genres: British hip hop; road rap; UK drill
- Years active: 2012–present
- Label: Buzzworl Entertainment
- Website: www.buzzworlent.com

Savimbi D’Silva B. Neto (born 3 January 1994), known professionally as Ambush Buzzworl or simply Ambush, is a British rapper. In 2018 the remix to his track "Jumpy", featuring Chip and Skepta, peaked at number 81 on the UK Singles Chart. In November his single "Man Can't" reached number 85 on the same chart. In December, Complex ranked the "Jumpy" remix as the UK's best song of 2018.

== Other ventures ==
On 19 September, 2026, Misfits Boxing announced that Ambush would face fellow rapper Swarmz in an MF–Professional boxing on October 10 at the Copper Box Arena in London, England. The bout is set to take place on the Joey Essex vs. Dapper Laughs undercard.

On 1 November, Ambush was announced as a late replacement opponent for rapper A2anti after Swarmz withdrew. The bout is scheduled for November 7 in Kilkenny, Ireland on the undercard of Russ Millions vs Kirky.

== Boxing record ==
=== MF–Professional ===
1 fight	0 wins	0 losses
Draws	1	

No.	Result	Record	Opponent	Type	Round, time	Date	Location	Notes
1	Draw	0–0–1	Swarmz	SD	4	10 Oct 2026	Copper Box Arena, London, England	

=== Exhibition ===
0 fights	0 wins	0 losses

No.	Result	Record	Opponent	Type	Round, time	Date	Location	Notes
1	Upcoming		A2anti	—N/a	– (3)	7 Nov 2026	TBA, Kilkenny, Ireland	
