= Collie Buddz (album) =

Studio album by Collie Buddz
- Released: July 3, 2007
- Recorded: 2005
- Genres: Reggae; rap; R&B; dancehall
- Length: 44:02
- Labels: Columbia; Sony BMG
- Producers: Collin "Collie Buddz" Harper; Supa Dups; Bobby Konders; Crown N Kah.So.Real; Di Genius; Jammy "Jam 2" James; Shea Taylor; Screwface; Bang Out; Curtis Lynch; Tony "CD" Kelly; Mitchum Chin

Collie Buddz chronology
Collie Buddz (2007)	Good Life (2017)

Singles from Collie Buddz
- 1. "Mamacita" Released: June 19, 2007

Professional ratings
Review scores
Source	Rating
AllMusic	4/5 stars
Spin	4/5 stars

Collie Buddz is the self-titled debut studio album by Bermudian reggae artist Collie Buddz. It was released on July 3, 2007 in the United States. It features guest appearances from Krayzie Bone, Paul Wall, Yung Berg and Roache. The album sold 10,825 copies in its first week of sales, reaching number 68 on the Billboard 200. Its lead single, "Come Around", peaked at #47 on the US Billboard Hot R&B/Hip-Hop Songs chart.

== Track listing ==
By iTunes and album liner notes.

No.	Title	Writer(s)	Producer(s)	Length
1.	"Come Around"	Colin Harper, Dacosta Williams, David Madden, Dwight Pinkney, Hugh Hammond, Matthew Harper	Crown N Kah.So.Real	3:41
2.	"Blind to You"	Dwayne Chin-Quee, Mitchum "Khan" Chin, Harper	Supa Dups	3:47
3.	"Defend Your Own" (featuring Krayzie Bone)	Patrick Bonsu, Harper, Stephen McGregor	Di Genius	3:54
4.	"Tomorrow's Another Day"	Chin-Quee, Harper, Mitchum "Khan" Chin	Supa Dups, Mitchum "Khan" Chin	3:15
5.	"Mamacita"	Harper, Harper, Michael Keith, Lescott Lyttle, Arnold Hennings, Daron Jones	Daron Jones	3:14
6.	"Wild Out"	Colin Edwards, Harper, Jammy James	Jam 2	2:36
7.	"She's Lonely" (featuring Yung Berg)	Harper, Shea Taylor, Christian Ward	Shea Taylor	3:06
8.	"What a Feeling" (featuring Paul Wall)	Harper, Harper, Paul Michael Slayton, Albert Charles	Screwface	4:31
9.	"Movin' On"	Harper, Harper, Phil Pitts	Bang Out	3:37
10.	"Sensimilla" (featuring Roache)	Chin-Quee, Harper, Harper, Mitchum "Khan" Chin	Supa Dups, Mitchum "Khan" Chin (co.)	3:27
11.	"Let Me Know"	Harper, Nick Listrani, Bobby Konders	Bobby Konders	3:06
12.	"My Everything"	Harper, David Robert Jones	Curtis Lynch	2:42
13.	"Love Deh"	Harper, Konders, Ricky Myrie	Bobby Konders	3:06

Sample credits

- "Come Around" contains samples of "Last War" by Zap Pow
- "Blind to You" contains samples of "Strange Things" by John Holt
- "My Everything" contains samples of "Let's Dance" by David Bowie

== Chart history ==
Chart (2007)	Peak position
US Billboard 200	68
US Top R&B/Hip-Hop Albums (Billboard)	15
US Top Rap Albums (Billboard)	7
US Reggae Albums (Billboard)	1
