= Good Life (Collie Buddz album) =

Studio album by Collie Buddz
- Released: May 19, 2017
- Genre: Reggae
- Length: 31:00
- Label: Harper Digital Entertainment
- Producer: Collie Buddz

Collie Buddz chronology
| Collie Buddz (2007) | Good Life (2017) | Hybrid (2019) |

Good Life is the second studio album by the dancehall artist Collie Buddz. It was released on May 19, 2017 via Harper Digital Entertainment. It features guest appearances from Jody Highroller, Kat Dahlia, Kreesha Turner, P-Lo and Snoop Dogg. The album peaked at number 1 on the US Billboard Reggae Albums chart and number 29 on the Independent Albums chart.

== Track listing ==
| No. | Title | Length |
|---|---|---|
| 1. | "Control" | 3:00 |
| 2. | "Lovely Day" | 3:18 |
| 3. | "Part of My Life" | 3:02 |
| 4. | "Save Me From the Rain" (featuring Kat Dahlia) | 3:27 |
| 5. | "Good Life" | 3:00 |
| 6. | "I Got You" | 2:50 |
| 7. | "Used To" (featuring Kreesha Turner) | 3:18 |
| 8. | "Level" (featuring P-Lo) | 2:55 |
| 9. | "Yesterday" (featuring Jody Highroller & Snoop Dogg) | 3:05 |
| 10. | "Glass House" | 2:59 |
| Total length: | | 31:00 |

== Chart history ==
| Chart (2017) | Peak position |
|---|---|
| US Independent Albums (Billboard) | 29 |
| US Reggae Albums (Billboard) | 1 |
