= The Rated Legend =

Studio album by Cadet
- Released: 10 April 2020
- Recorded: 2017–19
- Genre: Afroswing; grime; hip hop
- Length: 42:45
- Label: Underrated Legends
- Producer: Show N Prove; Da Beatfreakz

Cadet chronology
The Commitment 2 (2017)	The Rated Legend (2020)

Singles from The Rated Legend
- 1. "Advice" Released: 28 August 2018; 2. "Gang Gang" Released: 29 August 2019; 3. "Support Me" Released: 11 March 2020; 4. "Roley" Released: 8 April 2020

The Rated Legend is the debut studio album by British rapper Cadet. The album was released posthumously on 10 April 2020 via Cadet's independent imprint Underrated Legends. Its title comes from a reversal of the nickname used to describe Cadet, "The Underrated Legend".

== Background ==
On 2 March 2020, Cadet's cousin Krept announced that Cadet's album The Rated Legend would be released the following month on 10 April 2020. It would include the singles "Advice" and "Gang Gang" as well as previously unreleased music, and features vocal contributions from Young Adz, Krept, Swarmz, Wretch 32, Chip, Tion Wayne, and Deno, and production from Show N Prove and Da Beatfreakz. Krept was the executive producer for the album and stated that all the guest artists and producers had contributed to the album for free.

== Promotion ==
In promotion of the album, a short film titled Support Me was released on 11 March 2020 along with the lead single of the album. The film is based on the subject of an aspiring writer looking to his significant other for support and motivation whilst he chases his career. It also touches on the themes of love and success, displaying a narrative in which a young man attempts to balance his career as a writer and time with his significant other. The film was distributed by ADV Films and was released on YouTube via Cadet's channel.

== Singles ==
"Advice" was released as a non-album single originally on 28 August 2018. The track was produced by longtime collaborator of Cadet, Da Beatfreakz. It entered the UK Singles Chart at number 54, reaching a peak of number 14 in its 30 weeks of charting, and 2 weeks after the death of Cadet. It ultimately became Cadet's first charted single which was also his highest and longest-running. The second single "Gang Gang" was released posthumously on 29 August 2019 and was produced by LA Beats. It entered the UK Singles Charts at 82 on 12 August 2019 where it remained on the charts for a week. The third single "Support Me", which acted as the lead single of the album, was released on 11 March 2020 and was produced by Dirty Saj. The song was released with a short promotional film of the same name released on YouTube via Cadet's channel.

== Critical reception ==
Professional ratings
Review scores
Source	Rating
Clash	8/10
Financial Times	4/5 stars
Gigwise	8/10 stars
NME	5/5 stars
The Observer	4/5 stars

The album was met with positive reviews. Ramy-Abou Setta of Clash said that Cadet "seals his legendary status in UK rap, showcasing natural storytelling ability through gritty lyrics and deep understanding of an authentic sound" and called the album "the perfect way to honour Cadet while staying true to his unique vision". Kyann-Sian Williams of NME called the album "a fitting showcase of his incredible talent" and stated that it "shows off the meticulous talents of one of south London's most successful underdogs, who was always unafraid to speak his mind". Emily Fortune of Gigwise highlighted Cadet's "abundance of energy" as he displays "everything from his humour to his deepest emotions, in a mixture of Afroswing infused instrumentals to old school inspired hip-hop and grime production", and summed up the album as showing "the impact that he had not only on his friends and fellow artists but on the UK rap scene as a whole".

== Track listing ==
The Rated Legend track listing
No.	Title	Producer(s)	Length
1.	"Take the Wheel"		3:41
2.	"Dope Boy" (featuring Young Adz and Krept)	Da Beatfreakz	2:52
3.	"Support Me"	Dirty Saj	3:08
4.	"Still" (featuring Wretch 32)		3:16
5.	"Trust Em"	Wonda	3:16
6.	"Gimme Space" (featuring Chip)		3:31
7.	"Roley" (featuring Swarmz)	Da Beatfreakz	3:17
8.	"Do What I Like" (featuring Tion Wayne)	Sangeet	3:14
9.	"Gang Gang"	LA Beats	3:25
10.	"Speechless"		4:00
11.	"Damages"	Sangeet	3:26
12.	"The Convo (Interlude)" (featuring Telixia Inico)		2:52
13.	"Advice" (with Deno)	Da Beatfreakz	3:13
Total length:			42:45

== Charts ==
Chart performance for The Rated Legend
Chart (2020)	Peak position
Scottish Albums (OCC)	60
UK Albums (OCC)	13
