= Trendy (song) =

Single by Cadet featuring Ay Em and Tion Wayne
- Released: 30 December 2018
- Genre: Hip hop
- Length: 2:43
- Label: Underrated Records
- Songwriters: Blaine Cameron Johnson, Ay Em, Tion Wayne

Cadet singles chronology
"Pumpy" (2018)	"Trendy" (2018)	"Gang Gang" (2019)

"Trendy" is a song by Cadet featuring Ay Em and Tion Wayne. It was released on 30 December 2018 and peaked at number 99 on the UK Singles Chart. This would be Cadet's last single released during his lifetime, despite future posthumous releases.

== Track listing ==
Digital download
No.	Title	Length
1.	"Trendy"	2:43

== Charts ==
Chart (2018)	Peak position
UK Singles (Official Charts Company)	99
