= In the Long Run =

British television series

- Genre: Comedy drama
- Created by: Idris Elba
- Starring: Idris Elba; Madeline Appiah; Jimmy Akingbola; Bill Bailey; Kellie Shirley; Sammy Kamara; Mattie Boys
- Country of origin: United Kingdom
- Original language: English
- No. of series: 3
- No. of episodes: 19

Production
- Executive producers: Idris Elba; Gina Carter; Jon Mountague; Tilusha Ghelani
- Producers: Charlie Hanson; Alex Walsh-Taylor
- Cinematography: Kelvin Richard; Simon Vickery; Ray Coates
- Editor: Adam Bokey

Original release
- Network: Sky One
- Release: 29 March 2018 – 27 August 2020

In the Long Run is a British comedy-drama television series created by Idris Elba which premiered on Sky One on 29 March 2018. Loosely based on Elba’s childhood, the show is set in the 1980s on the gritty, fictitious Eastbridge Estate in East London. The series follows the Easmon family; Walter (Elba), his wife Agnes (Madeline Appiah) and their 13-year-old British-born son Kobna (Sammy Kamara) who have settled in England after having arrived from Sierra Leone.

== Cast and characters ==
=== Main ===
- Idris Elba as Walter Easmon, patriarch of the Easmon family
- Madeline Appiah as Agnes Easmon, Walter's wife
- Jimmy Akingbola as Valentine Easmon, Walter's younger brother
- Bill Bailey as Terence "Bagpipes" De La Croix, Walter's best friend
- Kellie Shirley as Kirsty De La Croix, Bagpipes' wife
- Sammy Kamara as Kobna Easmon, Walter and Agnes' British-born son
- Mattie Boys as Dean De La Croix, Bagpipes and Kirsty's son

=== Supporting ===
- Deno (series 1) and Malaki Paul (series 2–3) as the singing boy
- Neil D'Souza as Rajesh, Walter, and Bagpipes' factory boss
- Jude Akuwudike as Uncle Akie
- Amani Johnson as Melissa (series 2–3), Kirsty's daughter
- Curtis Walker as Leon (series 2), Melissa's biological father
- Kadeem Ramsay as John "Barney" (series 2–3)
- Ellen Thomas as Mama (series 3), Walter's mother

== Episodes ==
Series	Episodes	Originally released	
Series	Episodes	First released	Last released
1	6	29 March 2018	26 April 2018
2	6 (+1)	16 October 2019	20 November 2019; 20 December 2019 (special)
3	6	23 July 2020	27 August 2020

=== Series 1 (2018) ===
No. overall	No. in series	Title	Directed by	Written by	Original release date
1	1	"Episode 1"	Declan Lowney	Claire Downes & Stuart Lane & Ian Jarvis	29 March 2018
Walter receives a letter from his mother telling him his fun-loving younger brother Valentine is coming from Sierra Leone to live with him. Agnes worries that Valentine will be a bad influence on the family.
2	2	"Episode 2"	Declan Lowney	Claire Downes & Stuart Lane & Ian Jarvis	29 March 2018
Instead of just taking occasional odd jobs, Walter arranges an interview for Valentine at the car parts factory where he works. A simply cash-in-hand electrical job lands Bagpipes in hot water when it turns out to be a brothel and is spotted leaving by wife Kirsty.
3	3	"Episode 3"	Declan Lowney	Claire Downes & Stuart Lane & Ian Jarvis	5 April 2018
Walter's wife Agnes rallies the neighbours to provide a decent send-off for a lonely pensioner who died in his flat. Bagpipes coaches Valentine after he signs up for open trials at Leyton Orient football club.
4	4	"Episode 4"	Declan Lowney	Grace Ofori-Attah	12 April 2018
Walter and Agnes goddaughter Cynthia arrives at the Easmons pleading for help with her engagement party. Cynthia's father, Uncle Akie, disapproves of the union between her and Kevin, her white Glaswegian fiance. Walter and Agnes agree to help smooth things over between the two families.
5	5	"Episode 5"	Cecile Emeke	Claire Downes & Stuart Lane & Ian Jarvis	19 April 2018
Kirsty tries to revive her flagging sex life with Bagpipes on their romantic trip away, to Essex in a motorhome. Valentine is dumped by Adelaide, a British-born woman of Sierra Leone heritage he met at the engagement party. Meanwhile, Agnes starts taking driving lessons with Walter but quickly realises it is mistake. Frustrated, she convinces a heartbroken Valentine to take over as her instructor, and uses the chance to offer some relationship advice.
6	6	"Episode 6"	Cecile Emeke	Claire Downes & Stuart Lane & Ian Jarvis & Grace Ofori-Attah	26 April 2018
Walter and Bagpipes become anxious when they hear rumours of job cuts at the factory. But when young Kobna overhears Walter considering moving back to Sierra Leone, he resorts to running away. A heartbroken Valentine lands a delivery job.

=== Series 2 (2019) ===
No. overall	No. in series	Title	Directed by	Written by	Original release date
7	1	"Episode 7"	Sandy Johnson	Danielle Ward	16 October 2019
Walter has been elected union representative at the factory and tasked with the difficult task of making job cuts. Kirsty is shocked when Melissa's biological father, Leon, turns up. Valentine finally moves out of the Easmons' home, but finds bachelor life is not what he thought it would be.
8	2	"Episode 8"	Sandy Johnson	Shivani Vijayapalan	23 October 2019
Feeling threatened by Leon's arrival, Bagpipes plans to run him out of town. When Valentine gets ripped buying a van from crooked garage owner Don, Agnes and Kobna are forced to intervene. The workers at Walter's and Bagpipes' factory go on strike.
9	3	"Episode 9"	Sandy Johnson	Grace Ofori-Attah	30 October 2019
With money tight due to strike at the factory, Agnes manages to get a job at the council. Bagpipes joins Valentine on a road trip delivering paper in Southend. Kobna helps the Easmon household income by getting a Saturday job at Don's garage.
10	4	"Episode 10"	Sandy Johnson	Ben Tagoe	6 November 2019
Walter is struggles to resolve the strike at the factory. With finances tight, Kirsty gets a job at the local bookies. Leon agrees to start to share in his responsibilities with Melissa. Kobna falls in love for the first time - with Don's daughter Kerry.
11	5	"Episode 11"	Sandy Johnson	Fraser Ayres	13 November 2019
Valentine DJs Don's daughter Kerry's birthday party and gives Kobna advice on how to impress her. Valentine confronts Don after overhearing an insensitive nickname he uses for Kobna at work. Leon decides to let Bagpipes adopt Melissa. First appearance of Kadeem Ramsay as John "Barney"
12	6	"Episode 12"	Sandy Johnson	Danielle Ward	20 November 2019
Bagpipes persuades Walter to come along with him and help smooth things over when they visit his estranged parents. Kirsty is busy organizing Melissa's adoption party at the Milton Arms.
Special
13	–	"Christmas Special"	Sandy Johnson	Jon Macqueen	20 December 2019
Walter, Christmas obsessed, throws the annual Easmon party together with Agnes and Bagpipes, only for it to spiral into chaos. Kobna and Dean try to earn some extra money by carol singing – despite not being actually being able to sing – and Valentine gets a job as a Christmas elf to make some extra cash.

=== Series 3 (2020) ===
No. overall	No. in series	Title	Directed by	Written by	Original release date
14	1	"Episode 14"	Sandy Johnson	Grace Ofori-Attah	23 July 2020
Walter's mother comes to visit from Sierra Leone. Valentine is worried that he will lose his place as Mama's favourite to her grandson Kobna. After a panic attack, Bagpipes assesses the fragility of life. Meanwhile, Agnes gets involved in the plans to improve the estate.
15	2	"Episode 15"	Sandy Johnson	Fraser Ayres	30 July 2020
Mama tries to find a nice lady for her lothario grandson Valentine. Agnes and Kirsty bump into a group of men who are planning to redevelop the estate. This leads to Kirsty to spot an opportunity for her catering business at the Milton Arms.
16	3	"Episode 16"	Ian Aryeh	Jon Macqueen	6 August 2020
Hearing that their boss Rajesh is having trouble getting his wife pregnant, Bagpipes and Walter hatch a plan to break Rajesh out of work. Valentine bumps into Dawn and uses all his charm to woo her. Meanwhile, at an overnight work conference Agnes discovers Charles Lander's plans for the estate.
17	4	"Episode 17"	Ian Aryeh	Grace Ofori-Attah	13 August 2020
Charles and Agnes join forces to present a new vision of the Eastbridge estate to the residents. Valentine's night DJing a gig does end well after he offends Dawn and her friend Andy. Kobna's plan to impress his friends with his new car end spectacularly badly.
18	5	"Episode 18"	Sandy Johnson	Shivani Vijayapalan	20 August 2020
Kirsty gets her first posh catering job but Agnes is reluctant to help when she realizes it's for a friend of her arch-rival - Charles Lander. Walter and Rajesh help Bagpipes get over his fear of death during a day out fishing. Valentine must use all his willpower to avoid the advances of an attractive lady at a boat party.
19	6	"Episode 19"	Sandy Johnson	Fraser Ayres	27 August 2020
Agnes and Kirsty fall out over the redevelopment of the estate. Valentine invites Walter and Agnes to a meal at his flat to introduce Dawn. Kobna comes clean about the car accident, and how he is being exploited by Uncle Akie. When the vote for the redevelopment of the estate ends in a tie, Walter realises he forgot to vote.

== Production ==
=== Development ===
In the Long Run is filmed at various locations across London including Kingston, Lewisham, Southwark and Lambeth. The housing estate scenes are filmed at Cambridge Road and Czar Street Estates in Lewisham and Kingston upon Thames, respectively. The Milton Arms pub interior scenes are shot at the Peckham Liberal Club, with exterior shots filmed at the Wheelshunters Club in Hornshay Street, Southwark.

The singing boy in series 1, known only as Singing Boy in the show’s credits, is young Eritrean-British singing sensation Deno Michael Mebrahitu aka Deno. The singer has had over 46 million listens on Spotify. 2012's Britain’s Got Talent semi-finalist Malakai Paul is the current Singing Boy, after taking over from Deno from series 2.

== Reception ==
The Guardian described In the Long Run as "less likely to prompt belly laughs than instil a warm glow, and has the unmistakable feel of a comedy still finding its feet. At its heart, however, it's a joyful portrait of community and camaraderie, of home and belonging, of dreams and joie de vivre."
