= Cindy Kimberly =

Spanish and Dutch model and influencer (born 1998)

- Born: Cindy Kimberly Rubira Adsuar; November 16, 1998 (age 28); Amsterdam, North Holland, Netherlands
- Occupations: Model, influencer, singer, fashion designer, actress
- Years active: 2015–present
- Partner: Dele Alli (2022–2025)
- Modeling information
- Height: 5 ft 7 in (170 cm)
- Hair color: Black
- Eye color: Dark Brown

Instagram information
- Page: Cindy Kimberly
- Years active: 2012–present
- Genres: Vlogging, modeling
- Followers: 7 million

TikTok information
- Page: Cindy Kimberly
- Years active: 2019–present
- Genres: Vlogging, modeling
- Followers: 2.6 million

X information
- Handle: @wolfiecindy
- Display name: ✭ 𝒞 𝒦 ✭
- Years active: 2015–present
- Topic: Entertainment
- Followers: 628 thousand

YouTube information
- Channel: cindy kimberly
- Years active: 2015–present
- Genres: Vlogging, modeling
- Subscribers: 686 thousand
- Views: 12.1 million
- Last updated: November 14, 2026
- Website: cindykimberly.com

Cindy Kimberly Rubira Adsuar (born November 16, 1998), also known as Wolfie Cindy, (Note: Sometimes spelled as WolfieCindy and stylized by her as wolfiecindy) is a Spanish and Dutch model, influencer, fashion designer, actress, and musician based in the United States. Kimberly garnered early attention in 2015 when she was noticed by Justin Bieber, who asked who she was on his Instagram. Afterwards, she began receiving multiple modeling offers, and has been featured in Vogue, Elle, Harper's Bazaar, Maxim, and Sports Illustrated Swimsuit, among others, as well as doing work for brands such as Yeezy, H&M, and Yves Saint Laurent. Additionally, in 2023, she launched her own clothing line and also subsequently began a career in acting and music.

== Early life ==
IES Maria Ibars, pictured here in 2024, the secondary school Kimberly attended

Cindy Kimberly Rubira Adsuar was born on November 16, 1998, in Amsterdam. She was born to a Spanish and French mother and her father was from Indonesia. At age three, her mother took Kimberly to her home country, settling in the Costa Blanca in the Valencian Community.

Kimberly is an only child, and her mother raised her alone. They were constantly moving in her youth, as her mother did not make much money, and Kimberly aided her by picking up a few jobs as a child, making €4 hourly as a babysitter and tutor. She attended IES Maria Ibars, a secondary school in Denia, located in the Valencian province of Alicante. She hated school and opted to start homeschooling at age 17.

Kimberly did ballet until age 14, and afterwards wanted to dedicate time to singing, but the tough financial situation meant her mother could not afford the necessary classes. Her mother was fan of American pop culture, loving Dolly Parton and Thelma & Louise, which had a strong influence on Kimberly. Kimberly aspired to become a major figure in the fashion world, with dreams of becoming a model.

Kimberly spent much of her youth online on sites such as Tumblr, Pinterest, and Twitter. Her home did not have Wi-Fi, and she used the connections of her neighbors through passwords provided by a hacker. She spent ages 10 to 16 reading fanfiction and being a part of various online communities oriented around pop cultural phenomena. Kimberly was also active on Tumblr, where, as well as on Instagram, she garnered some attention for her artwork. She often wrote pretend letters to her favorite celebrities, and in particular idolized Justin Bieber. She ran a Justin Bieber fan account for six years, before eventually deactivating it, wanting to move on and "stop trying to get noticed by my favorites anymore".

== Career (2015–present) ==
Omg who is this!!
- Justin Bieber posting a photo of Kimberly
- via Instagram
- Post by Bieber (December 7, 2015)

The week she deleted her fan account of him, Bieber shared a photo of her to his millions of followers on Instagram captioned "Omg who is this!!". Her extensive digital footprint led to her being found by the internet in a few hours, and within a day, she was the topic of extensive coverage from online and the media. Kimberly was soon after informed by her friends of the ordeal, but she initially dismissed it as a prank and only realized it was not when she checked her Instagram page the following day. Kimberly described the experience as "like a fairytale" as a longtime fan of Bieber, though she did note that the sudden attention was overwhelming at first. By January 2016, she had amassed 700 thousand followers on Instagram.

Following Bieber exposing her to the world, Kimberly was reached out to by various modeling agencies. On the advice of her mother, Kimberly opted to finish her studies before becoming a full-time model. She made her runway debut at Madrid Fashion Week. Her first major opportunity was with working with Yeezy, which came via a Tumblr inbox and was initially believed by her to be a prank. Early on, Kimberly's status as an influencer shaped how she was viewed by the modeling industry according to her; brands were attracted to it while her agents were not, and she spent much of her early career fighting with the former over projects she wanted to be in. In 2020, this, compounded with lessened work during the COVID-19 pandemic, resulted in her starting to do self-shooting.

Kimberly has been featured in Vogue Spain, Harper's Bazaar Spain, Elle, Cosmopolitan, and GQ. She has worked with brands such as Savage X Fenty, Marc Jacobs, H&M, Tommy Hilfiger, Saint Laurent, Versace, Prada, Jacquemus, Kilian, MAC Cosmetics, and Zalando. Among others, she has walked for GCDS, Philipp Plein, and Mirror Palais. In late 2021, she was featured on the cover of Maxim, and in 2022, she was featured as a rookie for that year's Sports Illustrated Swimsuit Issue, with a photoshoot in Barbados. In a May 2022 appearance on the BFFs podcast, she stated that she watched the rookies every year growing up.

On May 10, 2023, she launched her own clothing line, LOBA by Cindy Kimberly. The release was accompanied by a short film titled Dear Mila that was written, directed, and starring Kimberly. The initial collection was an homage to Kimberly's life in Spain, and inspired by the dream of summer. In addition to expressing herself, Kimberly did so to establish the stability to support a singing career, which she has described as her true passion. Additionally, she made her acting debut in the 2024 film Lake George. Starting in 2025, she also branched into making music.

== Personal life ==
Kimberly is fluent in three languages: English, Spanish, and Italian. She has stated that she learned English via "having a Twitter fan account", as well as English-language media. She is a fan of tattoos and had five of them as of June 2017. She is a fan of Rihanna. As a child, she was a fan of Teen Wolf, which was the inspiration behind the nickname WolfieCindy. The term "loba", which is the name of her clothing line, is Spanish for "wolf". She is an animal lover and aspired in her youth to have multiple rescued animals when she grew up.

Kimberly has been open about her struggles with mental health due to her status on social media. She has also struggled with body dysmorphia and eating disorders. She has stated that she has had mental health issues stemming from various traumatic events in her childhood, including realizing in retrospect that a parent was suffering from addiction.

In October 2016, Kimberly met American model and influencer Neels Visser, and the two began dating. The two broke up in March 2018. In 2017, she was alleged to be linked romantically to Lewis Hamilton, though this was denied by her. She dated English soccer player Dele Alli for three years. They were first pictured together while on vacation in Capri in June 2022. Kimberly praised Alli for opening up about his various life struggles, including experiences of child sexual abuse, in a Sky News interview with Gary Neville in 2023. The relationship ended in mid-2025.

Around 2017, she moved to Los Angeles from Spain, where she lived for five years before returning to Spain. During her relationship with Alli, she lived in London, which she described as her favorite city to live in. In 2026, she moved back to LA.
