= Gang Gang (Cadet song) =

2019 single by Cadet

Single by Cadet
- Released: 29 August 2019
- Genre: Hip hop
- Length: 4:01
- Label: Underrated Records
- Songwriter(s): Blaine Cameron Johnson

Cadet singles chronology
"Trendy" (2018)	"Gang Gang" (2019)	"Support Me" (2020)

"Gang Gang" is a song by Cadet. It was released posthumously on 29 August 2019 and peaked at number 82 on the UK Singles Chart. This would be Cadet's last single to ever be released.

== Background ==
"Gang Gang" was released posthumously via GRM Daily and highlights the prejudices black men face from being wrongfully targeted by the police and was sparked by an incident Cadet himself faced from the police. The single peaked at 82 on the official UK charts. It is the last song ever recorded by Cadet.

== Charts ==
Chart performance for "Gang Gang"
Chart (2019)	Peak position
UK Singles (Official Charts Company)	82
