= Cadet (rapper) =

British rapper (1990–2019)

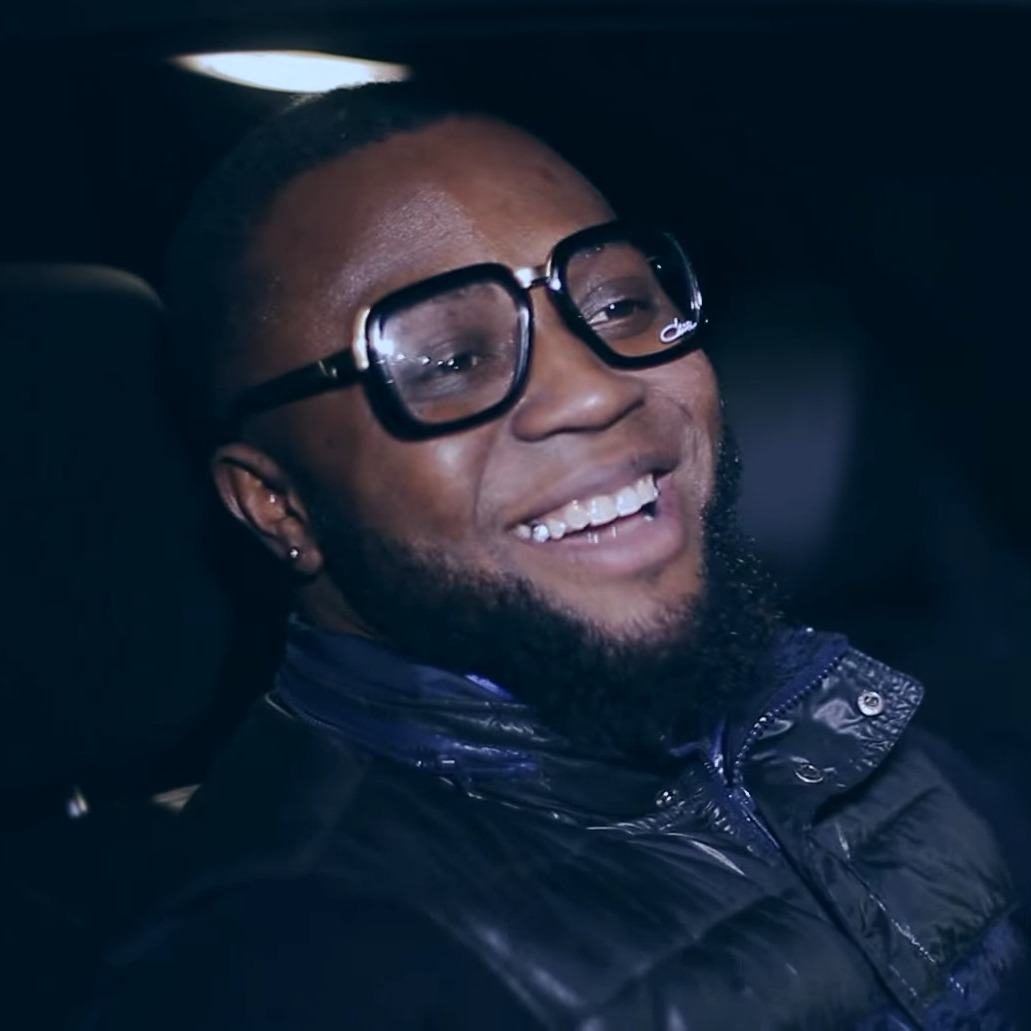
- Cadet performing a freestyle for OSM Vision in 2015

Background information
- Born: Blaine Cameron Johnson; 2 March 1990; Clapham, London, England, United Kingdom
- Died: 9 February 2019 (aged 28) Betley, Staffordshire, England, United Kingdom
- Genres: Hip hop; grime
- Years active: 2006–2019
- Formerly of: Krept and Konan; Deno
- Family: Casyo Johnson (cousin)

Blaine Cameron Johnson (2 March 1990 – 9 February 2019), known professionally as Cadet, was a British rapper. Johnson began pursuing a career as a rapper in 2011, releasing a number of freestyles through YouTube outlets such as OSM Vision and Link Up TV. His debut project, The Commitment, was released in 2016, followed by The Commitment 2 the following year. He is perhaps best known for his single "Advice" featuring Deno, which peaked at number 14 on the UK Singles Chart.

Johnson died in a car accident on 9 February 2019 on his way to a gig at Keele University in Staffordshire, three weeks before what would have been his 29th birthday.

== Career ==
=== Gipset and underground career (2006–2009) ===
Cadet first became known for his association with Krept and Konan's Gipset crew in 2006, frequently appearing in music videos for the group's freestyles. Cadet released his first commercial mixtape, Are You Ready, on 4 April 2008. The Gipset crew garnered a considerable following across social media toward the end of 2010 through their freestyles about gang life and London living. Gipset broke up in 2013 after Krept and Konan signed their major label deal, and all other members focused on their solo careers.

=== Solo career beginnings and The Commitment (2010–2015) ===
Cadet began pursuing a solo career in 2010. He was featured on the single Dungeon Dragons by Stormzy in 2011 and collaborated with the rapper again in 2012 on the single GrimeWork. Cadet released a series of bars for SBTV throughout his years, including a Warm up session released in 2015.

He released his first freestyle, "Slut", via OSM Vision in July 2015. The song was popular, and had received over 3.1 million views as of February 2019. The following month, Cadet was selected by Link Up TV to appear on their Behind Barz freestyle series, and his freestyle was uploaded to YouTube on 17 August 2015, receiving 2.3 million views as of February 2019. The freestyle attracted praise from American media outlet Complex, who called it "storytelling at its finest" and "better than some rappers' whole mixtape".

Cadet's debut EP, The Commitment, was released in 2016. The EP has features from Donae'o, Konan and Tis Rome. It was the first commercial release by the rapper. Cadet received considerable recognition after releasing "Letter to Krept" in 2016. In "Letter to Krept", Cadet reaches out to communicate with his cousin Krept about a misunderstanding between the pair. Cadet explains their story together, describing the principal events which lead to the distance between them at the point of this song's release. Krept consequently released "Letter to Cadet" to share his side of the story. The single "Corn" featuring Big Tobz was released in December 2016.

=== Rise to fame and The Commitment 2 (2017–2018) ===
Cadet released his sophomore EP The Commitment 2, a sequel to his first release, in 2017. The EP featured guest appearances from Konan and Ghetts, as well as vocals from Shakka. In the same year, he released the singles "Southside" featuring Geko, and "What's Good" featuring Loski.

He released the single Closure, a part 2 to his "Slut Freestyle" in April 2018 to much success which gained international attention. Cadet was featured on the remix of Rudimental's single Toast to Our Differences alongside Jaykae and Shungudzo which was released on 12 June 2018. On 29 August 2018, Cadet released the single "Advice" featuring Deno. It was his first charting single, initially peaking at number 27 on the UK Top 40, and receiving over 18 million views on YouTube as of February 2019. The song was initially a freestyle which took place in Cadet's car before it was released as a single. His second charting single, "Pumpy", was released on 26 October 2018. The single was produced by Da Beatfreakz and had vocals from Swarmz and AJ & Deno. "Trendy" featuring Ay Em and Tion Wayne was released in December 2018. This would be the last single released during his lifetime.

=== Posthumous releases and The Rated Legend (2019–2020) ===
After consulting his family, Cadet's second Daily Duppy freestyle was released on GRM Daily on 22 April 2019 posthumously. On 29 August 2019, Cadets' single Gang Gang was also released posthumously. It was released via GRM Daily and highlights the prejudices black men face from being wrongfully targeted by the police and was sparked by an incident Cadet himself faced from the police. The single peaked at 82 on the UK Singles Chart.

On 1 March 2020, Cadet's cousin Krept announced that Cadet's studio album The Rated Legend was in the works. The album is his debut studio release and was released on 10 April 2020, with Krept serving as executive producer. It features Cadet's Platinum-certified single "Advice" and the posthumously released "Gang Gang" as well as previously unreleased music recorded during his life. Krept stated that he wishes to "keep Cadet's name alive and to make sure he can continue what he started and achieved". It was later revealed that all producers and artists contributed to the album for free. It was issued via Cadet's record label imprint Underrated Legends with production features from Show N Prove and Da Beatfreakz and includes vocal features from Young Adz, Krept & Konan, Swarmz, Wretch 32, Chip, Tion Wayne, and Deno.

== Personal life ==
Johnson was the cousin of fellow rapper Krept, and the two spent much of their childhood growing up together. Johnson converted to Islam at the age of 15 and mentioned his faith numerous times in his music. Johnson was of Jamaican descent.

== Death ==
On 9 February 2019, Johnson and three friends were on their way to a gig at Keele University in Staffordshire when a Vauxhall Combo slammed head-on into their Toyota Prius in Betley, approximately 8 km from the venue. Johnson died at the scene of severe head injuries. His friends and the drivers of both vehicles survived the accident and were sent directly to hospitals for treatment.

On 1 November 2019, 23-year-old Jordan Birch of Woore, Shropshire, was charged with killing Cadet by dangerous driving, and with seriously injuring Cadet's driver Kashif Usman. Birch had drunk six pints of beer and was above the blood alcohol limit, was driving at twice the speed limit, and was on the wrong side of the road. In December, he pleaded guilty to causing death by dangerous driving and causing serious injury by dangerous driving at a plea and hearing at Stoke-on-Trent Crown Court. In January 2020, Birch was sentenced to 4 years and 8 months, with the first half being in prison and the second half on licence.

=== Aftermath ===
Many of Johnson's contemporaries took to social media to pay tribute. Krept said he was "devastated and broken", and announced that a public tribute would take place the following day in Hyde Park, London. Deno released a tribute for Cadet titled "First Days" on 13 February 2019. Krept paid tribute to Cadet by releasing "Last Letter to Cadet" on 27 February 2019. The track also featured a verse from Konan.

== Discography ==
=== Studio albums ===
- The Rated Legend (2020)

=== Extended plays ===
- The Commitment (2016)
- The Commitment 2 (2017)

=== Singles ===
- "Closure" (2018)
- "Advice" (with Deno) (2018) – UK No. 14
- "Pumpy" (with Da Beatfreakz, AJ & Deno, Swarmz) (2018) – UK No. 70
- "Trendy" (featuring Ay Em and Tion Wayne) (2018)
- "Gang Gang" (2019) – UK No. 82
- "Support Me" (2020)

==== Tributes ====
- "First Days" by Deno (2019)
- "Last Letter to Cadet" by Krept and Konan (2019)
- "Letter to Cadet" by Rapman (2019)
- "It'll Kill You" by Lady Leshurr (2019)
- "Tribute to Cadet" by Clue (2019)
- "Underrated Legend" (Cadet Tribute) by Big Tobz (2020)
- "Dear Cadet" (Legacy Continues) by Shocka (2020)

== Filmography ==
Web
Year	Title	Role	Notes	Ref.
2018	Shiro's Story	Kyron	Part 2–3 (short YouTube series)	
