= Temporary licence =

Temporary parole for prisoners in England and Wales

Temporary licence, formally called release on temporary licence (ROTL) and also informally known as temporary release, is a form of temporary parole for prisoners in jail in English and Welsh prisons.

ROTL is divided into three categories:

compassionate licence
This class of licence is granted for exceptional personal circumstances, including funerals of close relatives, marriages, and medical appointments.
facility licence
This class of licence is granted to allow prisoners to participate in Community Service projects, attend life skills or education courses, undergo employment training, act as a police witness, attend at proceedings at civil courts, or visit a legal advisor.
resettlement licence
This class of licence is granted to allow prisoners to make arrangements for their release, including spending time at their release address, maintaining family ties, making arrangements for accommodation and for work or training upon release.

== See also ==
- Parole#United Kingdom
