= Pumpy =

2018 single by Da Beatfreakz

Single by Da Beatfreakz featuring AJ & Deno, Swarmz and Cadet
- Released: 26 October 2018
- Genre: Afroswing
- Length: 3:01
- Label: DBF Records (under Sony Music UK)
- Songwriter(s): Blaine Cameron Johnson, AJ & Deno, Swarmz, Da Beatfreakz, Tejai Moore, Jahmori Simmons, Mohammed Animashaun
- Producer(s): Da Beatfreakz

Cadet singles chronology
"Advice" (2018)	"Pumpy" (2018)	"Trendy" (2018)

Deno singles chronology
"Advice" (2018)	"Pumpy" (2018)	"First Days" (2019)

"Pumpy" is a song by Da Beatfreakz featuring Cadet, AJ & Deno and Swarmz. It was released on 26 October 2018 and peaked at number 70 on the UK Singles Chart.

== Charts ==
Chart (2018)	Peak position
UK Singles (Official Charts Company)	70
