= First Days (song) =

Single by Deno
- Released: 13 February 2019
- Genre: R&B
- Length: 3:20
- Label: Columbia Records
- Songwriter(s): Deno; Blaine Cameron Johnson

Deno singles chronology
"Pumpy" (2018)	"First Days" (2019)	"Change" (2019)

"First Days" is a song by British singer Deno, released as a tribute to Cadet after he died in a road collision in February 2019. The song was distributed via Columbia Records, however Underrated Records held the rights for the song. It was released on 13 February 2019 and peaked at number 71 on the UK Singles Chart. Deno stated that this song is independent and that all money made from it would be going to the family of Cadet.

== Track listing ==
Digital download
No.	Title	Length
1.	"First Days"	3:20

== Charts ==
Chart (2019)	Position
UK Singles (Official Charts Company)	71
