= Black the Ripper discography =

- Studio albums: 1
- EPs: 4
- Singles: 34
- Mixtapes: 11
- Collaborative mixtapes: 6
- Compilation mixtapes: 4
- Tributes by other artists: 8

This is the discography of Black the Ripper, a British rapper.

== Studio albums ==
- 2018: Money Grows on Trees

== Extended plays ==
- 2015: Excuse Me While I Kiss the Sky
- 2017: In Dank We Trust
- 2017: Doe or Die: Volume 1
- 2019: Doe or Die: Volume 2

== Mixtapes ==
- 2005: Black Is Beautiful
- 2006: Holla Black
- 2007: Summer Madness
- 2008: Afro Samurai
- 2009: Outlaw: Volume 1
- 2010: Flooding the Industry
- 2012: Black Is Beautiful: Volume 2
- 2014: Outlaw: Volume 2

Weed Related Projects

- 2013: Married to Marijuana
- 2013: 420 Mixtape
- 2016: Motivated Stoner (2 Versions)

=== With Iron Barz ===
- 2014: High End Weed Music
- 2014: High End 2

=== With Cookie and Chipmunk ===
- 2007: Motivation Music: Volume 1
- 2007: Motivation Music: Volume 2
- 2008: Motivation Music: Volume 3

=== With Jeeday Jawz and Random Impulse ===
- 2009: The One Project

=== Compilations ===
- 2007: Unreleased S**t
- 2009: Unreleased S**t: Volume 2
- 2009: The Edmonton Dream
- 2012: Unreleased S**t: Volume 3

== Singles ==
=== As primary artist ===
List of singles as a Primary artist, with featured performers, showing year released & album name
Title	Year	Featured performer(s)	Album
"Risky Roadz 2 Freestyle"	2006	Scorcher, Terminator, Dolla da Dustman	Non-album single
"Death Is Promised	2007		Unreleased Shit: Volume 1
"My Mind's Battle / Can't Control It"	2007		Holla Black
"It's Bedtime" (Dolla da Dustman, Dynamic and Deadly MC Diss)	2009		Outlaw: Volume 1
"Floating"	2009		Outlaw: Volume 1
"Midnight Love"	2009		Outlaw: Volume 1
"Sarah Love (Tribute)"	2012	Mystro, Loudmouth	Unreleased Shit: Volume 3
"Throwaway Thoughts"	2012		Black Is Beautiful: Volume 2
"Real Recognise Real"	2012		Unreleased Shit: Volume 3
"Married to Marijuana"	2012		Married to Marijuana
"The Remedy"	2013	Harry Love	Married to Marijuana
"Kosher Tangie"	2014	Iron Barz	Outlaw: Volume 2
"Revolution Ting"	2014	Lowkey, Akala	Outlaw: Volume 2
"Chasing Papers"	2014	Jaja Soze	Outlaw: Volume 2
"We Get High"	2015		420 Mixtape
"I Wanna Get High"	2015		420 Mixtape
"How High"	2015	JC	420 Mixtape
"Ital"	2015		Excuse Me Whilst I Kiss the Sky
"Stay High"	2015		Excuse Me Whilst I Kiss the Sky
"Put It in Your Mouth"	2016		Motivated Stoner
"Light Up Everywhere"	2016		Motivated Stoner
"Weed Is My bestfriend"	2016	Popcaan, Chip, Shorty & Frisco	Motivated Stoner
"All I Do"	2016	Iron Barz	Motivated Stoner
"D.O.E"	2017	Iron Barz, Stoner	In Dank We Trust
"Higher"	2017	Moss	In Dank We Trust
"In Dank We Trust"	2017	Tayong	In Dank We Trust
"How Can I Relate"	2017	Iron Barz, Stoner	Doe or Die: Volume 1
"Cough a Lung Up"	2017	Iron Barz, Stoner	Doe or Die: Volume 1
"Doe or Die"	2017	Iron Barz	Doe or Die: Volume 1
"Bill It"	2018	Big Narstie, Chip & Smasher	Money Grows on Trees
"Twenty Pre-Rolls"	2019	Iron Barz	Doe or Die: Volume 2
"Doegang"	2019		Doe or Die: Volume 2
"Sunset"	2020	Iron Barz	Non-album single

=== Guest appearances ===
List of non-single guest appearances, with other performing artists, showing year released and album name
Title	Year	Other performer(s)	Album
"I Still Believe"	2010	Lowkey, Akala	Non-album single
"Not Like You"	2010	Charlie Sloth, Farma G	The Black Book
"Obama Nation: Part 2"	2011	Lowkey, M-1	Soundtrack to the Struggle
"London Reppin'"	2011	Cerose, Ghetts	
"Heart of Stone"	2012	Bashy, Lady Leshurr, Dot Rotten	
"Link Up Season"	2015	Dexplicit, Chip, Swiss, Flowdan, Rocks Foe, Durrty Goodz	
"Smokin' (remix)"	2016	Nafe Smallz, Chip	

=== Tributes ===
List of tributes to Black the Ripper by other artists
Title	Year	Performer(s)	Album
"Hope Dealers"	2020	Jammer	Non-album singles
"0420"	2020	Chip	Non-album singles
"RIP Black the Ripper"	2020	Iron Barz	Non-album singles
"RIP Black the Ripper"	2020	Stoner	Non-album singles
"Flowers"	2020	Little Torment	Non-album singles
"Daily Duppy"	2020	Lowkey	Non-album singles
"Daily Duppy 2"	2020	Chip	Non-album singles
"Eye for an Eye"	2020	Benny Banks	Non-album singles
"Lemon Pepper Freestyle"	2021	Chip	Non-album singles
