= List of UK top-ten albums in 2015 =

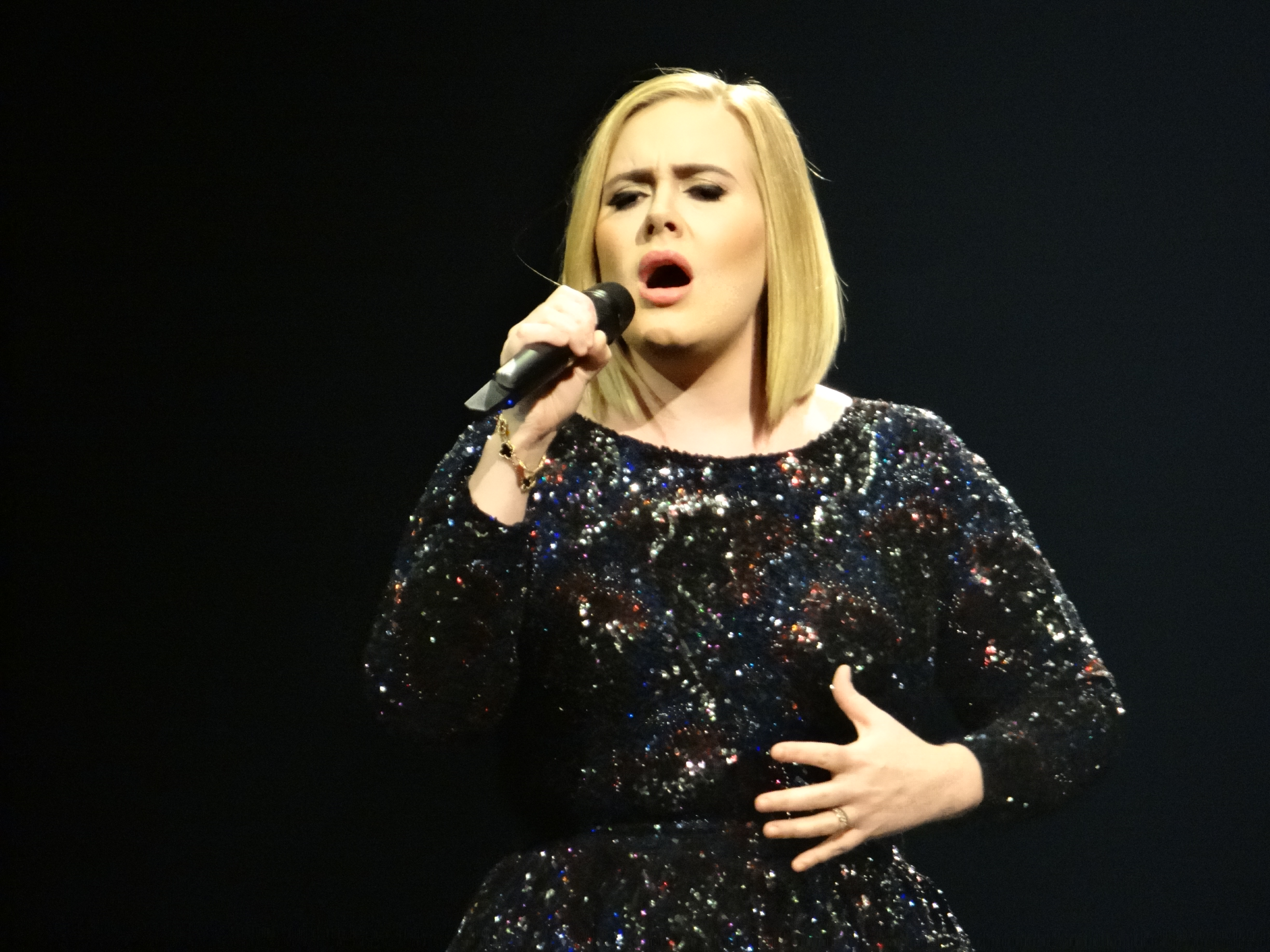
Adele had the best-selling album of 2015 with her third studio album 25. As well as being this year's Christmas number-one album, 25 would also become the best-selling album of 2016. Since its release, the album has sold an estimated 3,500,000 million copies in the UK alone.

The UK Albums Chart is one of many music charts compiled by the Official Charts Company that calculates the best-selling albums of the week in the United Kingdom. Since 2004 the chart has been based on the sales of both physical albums and digital downloads. This list shows albums that peaked in the top ten of the UK Albums Chart during 2015, as well as albums which peaked in 2014 and 2016 but were in the top ten in 2015. The entry date is when the album appeared in the top ten for the first time (week ending, as published by the Official Charts Company, which is six days after the chart is announced).

One-hundred and sixty-nine albums were in the top 10 this year. Fifteen albums from 2014 remained in the top ten for several weeks at the beginning of the year, while A Head Full of Dreams by Coldplay was released in 2015 but did not reach its peak until 2016. Hozier by Hozier was the only album from 2014 to reach its peak in 2015. James Bay, Jess Glynne, Years & Years and The Weeknd were among the many artists who achieved their first UK charting top-ten album in 2015.

The first new number-one album of the year was Uptown Special by Mark Ronson. Overall, thirty-five different albums peaked at number one in 2015, with thirty-five unique artists hitting that position.

== Background ==
=== Chart debuts ===
The following table (collapsed on desktop site) does not include acts who had previously charted as part of a group and secured their first top 10 solo album, or featured appearances on compilations or other artists recordings.

Artist	Number of top 10s	First entry	Chart position	Other entries
Meghan Trainor	1	Title	1	—
Rae Morris	1	Unguarded	9	—
Kid Ink	1	Full Speed	10	—
Tyga	1	Fan of a Fan: The Album	7	—
The Shires	1	Brave	10	—
Kendrick Lamar	1	To Pimp a Butterfly	1	—
James Bay	1	Chaos and the Calm	1	—
Sia	1	1000 Forms of Fear	5	—
Sufjan Stevens	1	Carrie & Lowell	6	—
Circa Waves	1	Young Chasers	10	—
Halestorm	1	Into the Wild Life	10	—
Adam Lambert	1	The Original High	8	—
Wolf Alice	1	My Love Is Cool	2	—
Leon Bridges	1	Coming Home	8	—
Krept and Konan	1	The Long Way Home	2	—
Saint Raymond	1	Young Blood	8	—
Lucy Rose	1	Work It Out	9	—
Years & Years	1	Communion	1	—
Tame Impala	1	Currents	3	—
Lamb of God	1	VII: Sturm und Drang	7	—
Bugzy Malone	1	Walk with Me (EP)	8	—
Don Broco	1	Automatic	6	—
Neck Deep	1	Life's Not out to Get You	8	—
Jess Glynne	1	I Cry When I Laugh	1	—
Bars and Melody	1	143	4	—
The Weeknd	1	Beauty Behind the Madness	1	—
Ella Eyre	1	Feline	4	—
Halsey	1	Badlands	9	—
Troye Sivan	1	Wild (EP)	5	—
Five Finger Death Punch	1	Got Your Six	6	—
Future	1	What a Time to Be Alive	6	—
John Grant	1	Grey Tickles, Black Pressure	5	—
Jamie Lawson	1	Jamie Lawson	1	—
Nothing but Thieves	1	Nothing but Thieves	7	—
Joanna Newsom	1	Divers	10	—
Jack Pack	1	Jack Pack	8	—
Alexander Armstrong	1	A Year of Songs	6	—
Ben Haenow	1	Ben Haenow	10	—

=== Best-selling albums ===
Adele had the best-selling album of the year with 25. × by Ed Sheeran came in second place. Sam Smith's In the Lonely Hour, If I Can Dream from Elvis Presley with the Royal Philharmonic Orchestra and Purpose by Justin Bieber made up the top five. Albums by Taylor Swift, Jess Glynne, James Bay, Coldplay and George Ezra were also in the top ten best-selling albums of the year.

== Top-ten albums ==
Key

Symbol	Meaning
‡	Album peaked in 2014 but still in chart in 2015.
♦	Album released in 2015 but peaked in 2016.
(#)	Year-end top-ten album position and rank
Entered	The date that the album first appeared in the chart.
Peak	Highest position that the album reached in the UK Albums Chart.

Entered (week ending)	Weeks in top 10	Album	Artist	Peak	Peak reached (week ending)	Weeks at peak
Albums in 2014
22 March 2014	29	A Perfect Contradiction ‡	Paloma Faith	2	22 March 2014	2
26 April 2014	23	Caustic Love ‡	Paolo Nutini	1	26 April 2014	3
7 June 2014	76	In The Lonely Hour ‡ (#3)	Sam Smith	1	7 June 2014	8
5 July 2014	77	× ‡ (#2)	Ed Sheeran	1	5 July 2014	13
12 July 2014	47	Wanted on Voyage ‡ (#10)	George Ezra	1	11 October 2014	4
6 September 2014	7	Royal Blood ‡	Royal Blood	1	6 September 2014	1
27 September 2014	6	No Sound Without Silence ‡	The Script	1	27 September 2014	1
18 October 2014	15	Hozier	Hozier	3	23 May 2015	1
25 October 2014	7	Chapter One ‡	Ella Henderson	1	25 October 2014	1
8 November 2014	43	1989 ‡ (#6)	Taylor Swift	1	8 November 2014	1
15 November 2014	3	Motion ‡	Calvin Harris	2	15 November 2014	1
29 November 2014	9	Four ‡	One Direction	1	29 November 2014	1
6 December 2014	11	Never Been Better ‡	Olly Murs	1	6 December 2014	1
13 December 2014	4	III ‡	Take That	1	13 December 2014	1
20 December 2014	3	Christmas ‡	Michael Bublé	7	27 December 2014	1
Albums in 2015
31 January 2015	3	Uptown Special	Mark Ronson	1	31 January 2015	1
31 January 2015	2	American Beauty/American Psycho	Fall Out Boy	2	31 January 2015	1
31 January 2015	1	The Mindsweep	Enter Shikari	6	31 January 2015	1
31 January 2015	1	Girls in Peacetime Want to Dance	Belle and Sebastian	9	31 January 2015	1
7 February 2015	11	Title	Meghan Trainor	1	7 February 2015	1
7 February 2015	1	Modern Nature	The Charlatans	7	7 February 2015	1
7 February 2015	1	Unguarded	Rae Morris	9	7 February 2015	1
14 February 2015	2	Shadows in the Night	Bob Dylan	1	14 February 2015	1
14 February 2015	1	Brothers in Arms	Dire Straits	8	14 February 2015	1
14 February 2015	1	Full Speed	Kid Ink	10	14 February 2015	1
21 February 2015	2	If You're Reading This It's Too Late	Drake	3	21 February 2015	1
21 February 2015	1	Coming Up for Air	Kodaline	4	21 February 2015	1
21 February 2015	2	Liquid Spirit	Gregory Porter	9	7 March 2015	1
28 February 2015	2	Smoke + Mirrors	Imagine Dragons	1	28 February 2015	1
28 February 2015	1	Texas 25	Texas	5	28 February 2015	1
28 February 2015	1	Wonder Days	Thunder	9	28 February 2015	1
7 March 2015	1	Physical Graffiti: Deluxe Edition	Led Zeppelin	6	7 March 2015	1
7 March 2015	1	Fan of a Fan: The Album	Chris Brown & Tyga	7	7 March 2015	1
14 March 2015	4	Chasing Yesterday	Noel Gallagher's High Flying Birds	1	14 March 2015	1
14 March 2015	1	Piece by Piece	Kelly Clarkson	6	14 March 2015	1
14 March 2015	2	Sweet Soul Music	The Overtones	8	14 March 2015	1
14 March 2015	1	Brave	The Shires	10	14 March 2015	1
21 March 2015	1	Rebel Heart	Madonna	2	21 March 2015	1
21 March 2015	1	Lady Sings the Blues	Rebecca Ferguson	7	21 March 2015	1
28 March 2015	2	To Pimp a Butterfly	Kendrick Lamar	1	28 March 2015	1
28 March 2015	1	Tracker	Mark Knopfler	3	28 March 2015	1
28 March 2015	1	Duets: Re-working the Catalogue	Van Morrison	5	28 March 2015	1
28 March 2015	1	Froot	Marina and the Diamonds	10	28 March 2015	1
4 April 2015	32	Chaos and the Calm (#8)	James Bay	1	4 April 2015	1
4 April 2015	1	Sonic Soul Surfer	Seasick Steve	4	4 April 2015	1
4 April 2015	1	Short Movie	Laura Marling	7	4 April 2015	1
4 April 2015	1	For All My Sisters	The Cribs	9	4 April 2015	1
11 April 2015	3	The Day Is My Enemy	The Prodigy	1	11 April 2015	1
11 April 2015	6	1000 Forms of Fear	Sia	5	11 April 2015	2
11 April 2015	1	Carrie & Lowell	Sufjan Stevens	6	11 April 2015	1
11 April 2015	1	Young Chasers	Circa Waves	10	11 April 2015	1
18 April 2015	1	Future Hearts	All Time Low	1	18 April 2015	1
25 April 2015	9	The Ultimate Collection	Paul Simon	1	25 April 2015	1
25 April 2015	1	Glitterbug	The Wombats	5	25 April 2015	1
25 April 2015	1	Into the Wild Life	Halestorm	10	25 April 2015	1
2 May 2015	2	Stages	Josh Groban	1	2 May 2015	1
2 May 2015	1	Sound & Color	Alabama Shakes	6	2 May 2015	1
9 May 2015	2	The Magic Whip	Blur	1	9 May 2015	1
16 May 2015	7	Wilder Mind	Mumford & Sons	1	16 May 2015	2
23 May 2015	1	Forever Man	Eric Clapton	8	23 May 2015	1
30 May 2015	2	The Desired Effect	Brandon Flowers	1	30 May 2015	1
30 May 2015	1	Saturns Pattern	Paul Weller	2	30 May 2015	1
30 May 2015	2	Sol Invictus	Faith No More	6	30 May 2015	1
30 May 2015	1	Number 1 to Infinity	Mariah Carey	8	30 May 2015	1
6 June 2015	2	85% Proof	Will Young	1	6 June 2015	1
6 June 2015	1	English Graffiti	The Vaccines	2	6 June 2015	1
6 June 2015	1	At. Long. Last. ASAP	ASAP Rocky	10	6 June 2015	1
13 June 2015	10	How Big, How Blue, How Beautiful	Florence and the Machine	1	13 June 2015	2
13 June 2015	2	Act Two	Collabro	2	13 June 2015	1
13 June 2015	1	In Colour	Jamie xx	3	13 June 2015	1
13 June 2015	1	Big Love	Simply Red	4	13 June 2015	1
13 June 2015	1	Are You Satisfied?	Slaves	8	13 June 2015	1
20 June 2015	5	Drones	Muse	1	20 June 2015	2
20 June 2015	1	Alternative Light Source	Leftfield	6	20 June 2015	1
20 June 2015	1	Sticky Fingers	The Rolling Stones	7	20 June 2015	1
20 June 2015	1	Beneath the Skin	Of Monsters and Men	10	20 June 2015	1
27 June 2015	1	Before This World	James Taylor	4	27 June 2015	1
27 June 2015	1	The Very Best of Glenn Miller	Glenn Miller	6	27 June 2015	1
27 June 2015	1	The Original High	Adam Lambert	8	27 June 2015	1
27 June 2015	2	The Very Best of Fleetwood Mac	Fleetwood Mac	7	23 July 2015	1
4 July 2015	1	My Love Is Cool	Wolf Alice	2	4 July 2015	1
4 July 2015	1	Get to Heaven	Everything Everything	7	4 July 2015	1
4 July 2015	1	Coming Home	Leon Bridges	8	4 July 2015	1
9 July 2015	5	The Definitive Collection	Lionel Richie & The Commodores	1	9 July 2015	1
9 July 2015	1	Still	Richard Thompson	10	9 July 2015	1
16 July 2015	1	The Long Way Home	Krept and Konan	2	16 July 2015	1
16 July 2015	1	Young Blood	Saint Raymond	8	16 July 2015	1
16 July 2015	1	Work It Out	Lucy Rose	9	16 July 2015	1
23 July 2015	7	Communion	Years & Years	1	23 July 2015	2
23 July 2015	1	+	Ed Sheeran	9	23 July 2015	1
30 July 2015	1	Currents	Tame Impala	3	30 July 2015	1
6 August 2015	1	Born in the Echoes	The Chemical Brothers	1	6 August 2015	1
6 August 2015	1	VII: Sturm und Drang	Lamb of God	7	6 August 2015	1
6 August 2015	1	Walk with Me (EP)	Bugzy Malone	8	6 August 2015	1
6 August 2015	1	Amused to Death	Roger Waters	10	6 August 2015	1
13 August 2015	2	Marks to Prove It	The Maccabees	1	13 August 2015	1
13 August 2015	1	Blood	Lianne La Havas	2	13 August 2015	1
13 August 2015	1	Coda: Deluxe Edition	Led Zeppelin	9	13 August 2015	1
13 August 2015	1	Presence: Deluxe Edition	Led Zeppelin	10	13 August 2015	1
20 August 2015	4	Compton	Dr. Dre	1	20 August 2015	1
20 August 2015	1	Positive Songs for Negative People	Frank Turner	2	20 August 2015	1
20 August 2015	1	Automatic	Don Broco	6	20 August 2015	1
20 August 2015	5	The Very Best of Cilla Black	Cilla Black	1	27 August 2015	1
27 August 2015	1	Venom	Bullet for My Valentine	3	27 August 2015	1
27 August 2015	1	Life's Not out to Get You	Neck Deep	8	27 August 2015	1
3 September 2015	42	I Cry When I Laugh (#7)	Jess Glynne	1	3 September 2015	1
3 September 2015	1	Burning Bridges	Bon Jovi	3	3 September 2015	1
3 September 2015	1	143	Bars and Melody	4	3 September 2015	1
3 September 2015	1	Immortalized	Disturbed	8	3 September 2015	1
10 September 2015	7	Beauty Behind the Madness	The Weeknd	1	10 September 2015	1
10 September 2015	1	What Went Down	Foals	3	10 September 2015	1
10 September 2015	1	Feline	Ella Eyre	4	10 September 2015	1
10 September 2015	1	Badlands	Halsey	9	10 September 2015	1
10 September 2015	1	Bad Magic	Motörhead	10	10 September 2015	1
17 September 2015	2	The Book of Souls	Iron Maiden	1	17 September 2015	1
17 September 2015	1	Wild (EP)	Troye Sivan	5	17 September 2015	1
17 September 2015	1	Got Your Six	Five Finger Death Punch	6	17 September 2015	1
17 September 2015	1	Cast in Steel	A-ha	8	17 September 2015	1
24 September 2015	3	Keep the Village Alive	Stereophonics	1	24 September 2015	1
24 September 2015	2	That's the Spirit	Bring Me the Horizon	2	24 September 2015	1
24 September 2015	1	Anthems for Doomed Youth	The Libertines	3	24 September 2015	1
24 September 2015	1	Paper Gods	Duran Duran	5	24 September 2015	1
24 September 2015	1	Hollow Meadows	Richard Hawley	9	24 September 2015	1
1 October 2015	4	Rattle That Lock	David Gilmour	1	1 October 2015	1
1 October 2015	1	Honeymoon	Lana Del Rey	2	1 October 2015	1
1 October 2015	1	75 at 75	Cliff Richard	4	1 October 2015	1
1 October 2015	1	What a Time to Be Alive	Drake and Future	6	1 October 2015	1
1 October 2015	1	Crosseyed Heart	Keith Richards	7	1 October 2015	1
8 October 2015	2	Caracal	Disclosure	1	8 October 2015	1
8 October 2015	1	Music Complete	New Order	2	8 October 2015	1
8 October 2015	1	Every Open Eye	Chvrches	4	8 October 2015	1
8 October 2015	1	Cass County	Don Henley	7	8 October 2015	1
15 October 2015	2	We the Generation	Rudimental	1	15 October 2015	1
15 October 2015	1	In Dream	Editors	5	15 October 2015	1
15 October 2015	1	Stories	Avicii	9	15 October 2015	1
22 October 2015	1	Faithless 2.0	Faithless	1	22 October 2015	1
22 October 2015	1	The Documentary 2	The Game	4	22 October 2015	1
22 October 2015	1	Grey Tickles, Black Pressure	John Grant	5	22 October 2015	1
29 October 2015	2	Jamie Lawson	Jamie Lawson	1	29 October 2015	1
29 October 2015	1	Revolve	John Newman	3	29 October 2015	1
29 October 2015	1	Come Fly with Me	Peter Andre	5	29 October 2015	1
29 October 2015	1	Confident	Demi Lovato	6	29 October 2015	1
29 October 2015	1	Nothing but Thieves	Nothing but Thieves	7	29 October 2015	1
29 October 2015	1	Electronica 1: The Time Machine	Jean-Michel Jarre	8	29 October 2015	1
5 November 2015	1	Sounds Good Feels Good	5 Seconds of Summer	1	5 November 2015	1
5 November 2015	1	Get Up	Bryan Adams	2	5 November 2015	1
5 November 2015	2	Cinema	Andrea Bocelli	3	5 November 2015	1
5 November 2015	1	Wisdom, Laughter and Lines	Paul Heaton & Jacqui Abbott	4	5 November 2015	1
5 November 2015	1	The Hank Williams Songbook	Daniel O'Donnell	5	5 November 2015	1
5 November 2015	1	Divers	Joanna Newsom	10	5 November 2015	1
12 November 2015	13	If I Can Dream (#4)	Elvis Presley with the Royal Philharmonic Orchestra	1	12 November 2015	2
12 November 2015	8	Another Country	Rod Stewart	2	12 November 2015	1
12 November 2015	1	Courting the Squall	Guy Garvey	3	12 November 2015	1
12 November 2015	1	Higher Than Here	James Morrison	7	12 November 2015	1
12 November 2015	1	Jack Pack	Jack Pack	8	12 November 2015	1
12 November 2015	1	Always: The Very Best of Erasure	Erasure	9	12 November 2015	1
19 November 2015	20	Get Weird	Little Mix	2	19 November 2015	1
19 November 2015	1	Delirium	Ellie Goulding	3	19 November 2015	1
19 November 2015	1	1	The Beatles	5	19 November 2015	1
19 November 2015	1	A Year of Songs	Alexander Armstrong	6	19 November 2015	1
19 November 2015	1	Ultimate Collection	Anastacia	10	19 November 2015	1
26 November 2015	9	Made in the A.M.	One Direction	1	26 November 2015	1
26 November 2015	33	Purpose (#5)	Justin Bieber	2	26 November 2015	2
26 November 2015	6	Alone in the Universe	Jeff Lynne's ELO	4	26 November 2015	1
26 November 2015	1	Roman Holiday	Andre Rieu & the Johann Strauss Orchestra	8	26 November 2015	1
26 November 2015	1	Ben Haenow	Ben Haenow	10	26 November 2015	1
3 December 2015	43	25 (#1)	Adele	1	3 December 2015	13
3 December 2015	4	Dark Sky Island	Enya	4	3 December 2015	1
10 December 2015	1	Wake Up	The Vamps	10	10 December 2015	1
17 December 2015	30	A Head Full of Dreams ♦ (#9)	Coldplay	1	18 February 2016	1

== Entries by artist ==
The following table shows artists who achieved two or more top 10 entries in 2015, including albums that reached their peak in 2014. The figures only include main artists, with featured artists and appearances on compilation albums not counted individually for each artist. The total number of weeks an artist spent in the top ten in 2015 is also shown.

Entries	Artist	Weeks	Albums
3	Led Zeppelin	3	Coda: Deluxe Edition, Physical Graffiti: Deluxe Edition, Presence: Deluxe Edition
2	Ed Sheeran	48	+, x
2	One Direction	10	Four, Made in the A.M.

== Notes ==
- Brothers in Arms originally peaked at number-one upon its initial release in 1985. It re-entered the top 10 at number 8 on 14 February 2015 (week ending) for one week after it was made available at a discounted price on digital music retailers.
- The Very Best of Glenn Miller originally peaked at number 4 upon its initial release in 2010.
- The Very Best of Fleetwood Mac re-entered the top 10 at number 7 on 23 July 2015 (week ending). It originally peaked at number 7 upon its initial release in 2002. The album reached a brand new peak of number 6 in 2009.
- The Definitive Collection originally peaked at number 10 upon its initial release in 2003. It made its ultimate peak of number-one in 2015 following Lionel Richie's performance at that year's Glastonbury festival.
- Amused to Death originally peaked at number 8 upon its initial release in 1992.
- The Very Best of Cilla Black originally peaked outside the top 10 at number 37 upon its initial release in 2013. In 2014, after the transmission of the ITV biopic Cilla, starring Sheridan Smith, the album re-entered the chart and peaked at number 26. It would ultimately make its peak of number-one following Cilla Black's death in August 2015.
- 1 originally peaked at number-one upon its initial release in 2000. It re-entered the top 10 at number 5 on 19 November 2015 (week ending) for one week, following the release of the deluxe edition of the album, entitled 1+
- Figure includes album that peaked in 2014.

== See also ==
- 2015 in British music
- List of number-one albums from the 2010s (UK)
