= Better Than Heavy =

Studio album by Mongrel
- Released: 7 March 2009
- Recorded: 2008–2009
- Length: 1:15:20
- Label: Wall Of Sound Ltd.
- Producer: Mongrel

Better Than Heavy is the lone studio album from supergroup Mongrel. It was released on 7 March 2009.

== Track listing ==
Disc 1

No.	Title	Length
1.	"Barcode" (featuring Pariz 1, Tor Cesay, Mpho and Saul Williams)	3:54
2.	"Lies"	3:21
3.	"Hit From the Morning Sun" (featuring Mpho, Tor Cesay and Pariz1)	3:32
4.	"Off the Leash"	1:02
5.	"The Menace"	3:21
6.	"Act Like That" (featuring Purple, Kyza, NoLay, Logic and Mic Righteous)	3:23
7.	"Julian"	3:47
8.	"Better Than Heavy"	4:13
9.	"Better Them Than Us" (featuring Skinnyman)	3:29
10.	"Alphabet Assassins" (featuring Deadly Hunta, Doc Brown, Frantic Frank, Ill Mill, Kyza, Logic, Purple, Mic Righteous, NoLay, Skinnyman, Skirmish, Smife, Stylah, Tony D, Wordplay and Wretch 32)	5:20
11.	"All Your Ever Afters"	3:46

Disc 2

No.	Title	Length
1.	"Guess Who's Coming Home" (featuring Skip McDonald)	4:56
2.	"Gun Dub" (featuring Samia Farah and Brother Culture)	3:47
3.	"Mr. 20%"	4:07
4.	"Better Than Dub" (featuring Samia Farah and Brother Culture)	5:24
5.	"Mesopotamia"	3:23
6.	"Alphabet vs. Brother Culture" (featuring Brother Culture)	3:41
7.	"45681950"	4:10
8.	"Brainwashing"	3:25
9.	"Hit From the Morning Dub"	3:19

== Personnel ==
Credits adapted from Better Than Heavy liner notes.

Mongrel

- Jon McClure - vocals
- Kareem Dennis - vocals
- Drew McConnell - guitar, bass guitar
- Andy Nicholson - guitar, bass guitar, synthesizer
- Joe Moskow - effects, guitar, piano, strings, synthesizer, trumpet, melodica
- Matt Helders - drums

Additional personnel

- Brother Culture - vocals
- Samia Farah - vocals
- DJ Moodie - scratches
- Dave Fullwood - trumpet
- Chris Petter - trombone
- Johnny Fielding - violin
- Crocodile - effects, sampler
- Bassekou Kouyate - ngoni
- Skip McDonald - guitar

Production

- Mongrel - production
- Anthony Lueng - additional mixing
- Adrian Sherwood - mixing, production
