= Ali Karim Esmaail =

English musician and engineer

- Born: March 7, 1990 (age 36); Manchester, England
- Other names: Ali, Ali Karim and Heygamal
- Occupations: record producer, mixer, engineer, song writer and multi-instrumentalist

Ali Karim Esmaail, known professionally as Ali Karim or Heygamal, is an English record producer, mixer, engineer, songwriter and multi-instrumentalist.

== Early life ==
Ali Karim Esmaail was born in Manchester, England, in 1990. He attended Chorlton High School.

== Fear of Music ==
Ali Karim was the lead bass player for the Manchester indie band Fear of Music. Ali Karim was in the band whilst still in High School. The band played at the In The City Unsigned festival in Manchester. The band was signed to Sony BMG in 2005 and was managed by Nettwerk Management. Ali Karim was with the band from its inception until they split.

== Other work ==
Following the split with Fear of Music, he pursued a career in sound engineering and production, learning his craft in the studios of Trevor Horn, John Leckie, Dimitri Tikovoï and others.

In 2016, Ali Karim (under his alias Heygamal) and Murkage Dave featured on a Vice/Noisey documentary series called '48 Hour Mixtape'.

Ali Karim worked with Bugzy Malone on a number of projects including King of the North. The video content for the B. Inspired tour was created under the supervision of Ali Karim.

== Discography ==
=== Bugzy Malone ===
Bugzy Malone
Title	Type	Release year	Certification	Role
We Don't Play	Single	2017	BPI: Silver	Mix engineer
B. Inspired	Album	2018	BPI: Gold	Production, co-production, engineering, mix engineering
Moving	Single	2016	BPI: Silver	Mix engineer
Memory Lane ft. Tom Grennan	Single	2017	BPI: Gold	Co-production, mix engineer
Run ft. Rag'n'bone Man	Single	2018	BPI: Silver	Co Mix engineer
King of the North	Album	2017	BPI: Gold	Production, co-production, engineer, mix, vocal production
Beauty and the Beast	Single	2016	BPI: Platinum	Production, mix
Through the Night (DJ Luck/Mc Neat)	Single	2017	BPI: Silver	Mix engineer
Facing Time	Album	2016	BPI: Silver	Production, co-production, vocal production, engineer, mix
Why So Serious	Mixtape	2015	-	Engineer, Vocal Production, Mix
Journal of an evil genius	Mixtape	2015	-	Engineer, Mix
Bruce Wayne	Single	2017	BPI: Silver	Producer, Engineer

=== Heygamal ===
Heygamal
Title	Type	Release year	Role
The Campus EP	EP	2016	Writer, Producer, Programmer, Engineer, Mixer

=== Murkage Dave ===
Murkage Dave
Title	Type	Release year	Role
Entertainment	Single	2023	Producer

=== Mike Skinner (musician) ===
Mike Skinner
Title	Type	Release year	Role
The BatPhone	Single	2014	Vocal Producer

=== Fabian Mccabe ===
Fabian McCabe
Title	Type	Release year	Role
Alky Hill	Album	2019	Production, co-production, programming, vocal production, mix
Synths and distortion	EP	2022	Production, co-production, programming, vocal production, mix
Buried	Single	2023	Production, co-production, programming, vocal production, mix

=== Duncan Reed ===
Duncan Reed
Title	Type	Release year	Role
Hypnotise	Album	2017	Engineer, Producer, Programmer

=== John Reed ===
John Reed
Title	Type	Release year	Role
Dry the Life	EP	2017	Engineer, Producer, Programmer, Mix
The Breeding Ground of Vile	Album	2018	Engineer, Producer, Programmer, Mix
Morescape	Album	2016	Production, engineer, mix

=== Fear of Music ===
Fear of Music
Title	Type	Release year	Role
Actor/Actress	Album	2008	Bass Guitar
We Are Not The Enemy	Single / EP	2006	Bass Guitar
Fast. Faster. Fastest.	Single / EP	2006	Bass Guitar
A Strange Kind of Terror	EP	2004	Bass Guitar
Woodwork	EP	2004	Bass Guitar
