= The Resurrection (Bugzy Malone album) =

Studio album by Bugzy Malone
- Released: 28 May 2021
- Recorded: 2020–2021
- Genres: Grime; hip hop
- Length: 52:25
- Label: B. Somebody
- Producers: Blinkie; Da Beatfreakz; GA; Jake Gosling; Kevin Gani; Rhymez; Sillkey; Swifta; Thomas Mellor

Bugzy Malone chronology
B. Inspired (2018)	The Resurrection (2021)	The Great British Dream (2024)

Singles from The Resurrection
- 1. "M.E.N III" Released: 8 August 2020; 2. "Don't Cry" Released: 19 November 2020; 3. "Cold Nights in the 61" Released: 20 December 2020; 4. "Notorious" Released: 7 January 2021; 5. "Welcome to the Hood" Released: 18 March 2021; 6. "Salvador" Released: 18 April 2021; 7. "Skeletons" Released: 13 May 2021; 8. "Ride Out" Released: 21 May 2021

The Resurrection is the second studio album by English grime rapper Bugzy Malone. It was released on 28 May 2021 by Malone's independent label B. Somebody and follows his 2018 debut album, B. Inspired. The album was heavily inspired by Malone's 2020 vehicle accident. The album features guest appearances from Dermot Kennedy, Emeli Sandé and Chip.

The album debuted at number 7 on the UK Albums Chart, number 1 on the UK R&B Singles and Albums Charts, number 36 on the Irish Albums Chart and number 13 on the Scottish Albums Chart.

== Singles ==
The album's lead single "M.E.N III", which acts as a sequel to "M.E.N" and "M.E.N II", was released 8 August 2020. The single charted at number 18 on the Official UK Charts, 12 on the UK R&B Singles and Albums Charts and 35 on the Irish Charts. The single was certified Silver by the BPI on 10 February 2023.

The second single, "Don't Cry" featuring Dermot Kennedy, was released 19 November 2020. The single charted at 77 on the UK Singles Chart, 33 on the UK R&B Singles and Albums Charts and 25 on the Irish Singles Chart.

The album's third single, "Cold Nights in the 61", was released 20 December 2020. The fourth single, "Notorious" featuring Chip, was released 7 January 2021. The single charted number 30 on the Official UK Charts, 10 on the UK R&B Singles and Albums Charts and 70 on the Irish Charts.

The fifth single, "Welcome to the Hood" featuring Emeli Sandé, was released 18 March 2021 and charted number 88 on the Official UK Charts. The sixth single, "Salvador", was released 18 April 2021 and charted at 89 on the Official UK Charts. The seventh and penultimate single "Skeletons", was released 13 May 2021 and charted at 80 on the Official UK Charts.

The eighth and final single, "Ride Out", was released 21 May 2021 and charted at number 68 on the Official UK Charts and 36 on the UK R&B Singles and Albums Charts

== Track listing ==
The Resurrection track listing
No.	Title	Writer(s)	Producer(s)	Length
1.	"The Resurrection"	Aaron Davies	Kevin Gani; Blinkie	5:15
2.	"M.E.N III"	Davies	Blinkie	3:43
3.	"Don't Cry" (featuring Dermot Kennedy)	Davies; Dermot Kennedy	Sillkey; Rhymez	2:48
4.	"Cold Nights in the 61"	Davies	Blinkie	4:15
5.	"Welcome to the Hood" (featuring Emeli Sandé)	Davies; Adele Sandé	Swfita; Jake Gosling	4:24
6.	"The Masters (Interlude)"	Davies	Rhymez	1:53
7.	"Van Gogh Effect"	Davies	Rhymez	3:57
8.	"Salvador"	Davies	Thomas Mellor; GA	2:56
9.	"Ride Out"	Davies	Blinkie	3:14
10.	"Bounce"	Davies	Rhymez	3:44
11.	"Notorious" (featuring Chip)	Davies; Jahmaal Fyffe	Kevin Gani; Blinkie	3:20
12.	"The Immortals (Interlude)"	Davies; Josh Berger	Kevin Gani; Blinkie	2:07
13.	"Gods"	Davies	Blinkie	3:45
14.	"Angels"	Davies	Da Beatfreakz	3:07
15.	"Skeletons"	Davies	Blinkie	3:49
Total length:				53:49

== Charts ==
Chart performance for The Resurrection
Chart (2021)	Peak position
Irish Albums (IRMA)	36
Scottish Albums (Official Charts)	13
UK Albums (Official Charts)	7
UK R&B Albums (Official Charts)	1
