= NoLay =

English rapper

- Also known as: Isabella; Bella Gotti
- Born: Natalie Athanasiou
- Origin: Croydon & Wellington, London, England
- Genres: British hip hop; grime
- Occupations: Rapper; songwriter; Actress; Business woman
- Years active: 2003–present
- Website: www.nolay.world

Natalie Athanasiou, known professionally as NoLay, Isabella, and Bella Gotti, is an English rapper of Greek-Cypriot and Caribbean background.

== Career ==
NoLay first contributed as a member of a grime music collective called Unorthodox. Unorthodox released "No Help or Handouts" in 2004, which grabbed the attention of major labels, leading to NoLay's first solo release, "Unorthodox Daughter". The track was included on Warner imprint label 679 Recordings' Run the Road compilation (2005) showcasing UK grime and featuring Dizzee Rascal, Wiley, Kano and others. The label also released a vinyl to record shops with just Plan B and Nolay on it to promote the release. Run the Road's success led 679 to release a second volume in 2006 on which Nolay features again with her track "Unorthodox Chick".

NoLay has opened for Mobb Deep and the Infamous Mobb. She toured Europe with Australian electronic rock group The Bumblebeez and featured on their 2006 track "Fuck Disco". In 2009 NoLay guested on Mongrel's Better Than Heavy album. She also featured on Tricky's 2014 album Adrian Thaws, and toured Europe with him.

In 2013, she appeared in a drama on Channel 4 called Top Boy, playing the character Mandy. Mandy was the girlfriend of leading character Dris and the mother of his child.

After a dozen EP and mixtape releases over the course of a decade, NoLay released the album This Woman in 2017, previewed by a video for track "Dancing with the Devil", which focused on domestic violence. Nolay also released a video in July 2017 for the track "Marching", also lifted from her March 2017 release This Woman.

In 2021, NOW Entertainment Magazine reported that Nolay had released a new song, "Gang Shit," from her seven-track hip-hop/rap album titled Kalas.

Explaining her name, NoLay says: "It comes from the times when I was younger. It's like you know referring to not procrastinating and wasting time. Just get to it and also take nothing lying down. Where I come from back then and even now people say No lay lay which means no hesitation. So one day a friend of mine from Peckham said I should call myself No lay." In 2014 NoLay changed her name to Bella Gotti, but then changed her name back, to stay true to her original fanbase. She has explained in interviews that her alias is an alter ego, similar to Eminem's Marshall Mathers and Slim Shady, or Jay Z's Jigga and Jay Hova.

== Style ==
NoLay is known for her gritty rhymes and wordplay that have garnered comparisons to MC Ghetts, with whom she has collaborated, but to whom she doesn't believe herself to be similar: "I used to be described as 'the female version of Ghetts'; how do you know Ghetts isn't the male version of me?"

== Personal life ==
On 24 April 2016, NoLay was involved in a car accident that saw her hospitalized.

== Discography ==
Singles

Year	Song	References
2005	"Unorthodox Daughter"	-
2005	"Unorthodox Chick"	-
2005	"Angels & Fly" [High Contrast ft. Nolay]	-
2007	"Things Could Get Ugly"	-
2008	"Bars of Truth"	-
2012	"Anarchy" (engineered at That SP Studios)	
2012	"The War"	-
2012	"Off With Ya Head"	-
2013	"Because I Like It"	-
2013	"Talking Money"	-
2013	"The Jungle (ft. Ghetts)"	-
2014	"Floating"	-
2014	"Ya Done Know"	-
2014	"Don't Stop" (ft. P Money & Blacks)	-
2014	"Holy Sinners" (Dot Rotten)	-
2015	"Legendary"	-
2015	"Netflix and Pills"	
2015	"Van Gogh"	-
2015	"Bloodstream"	-
2015	"Everybody Die"	-
2016	"Gotta Love It" (w/ Kid D)	
2016	"Have You Forgotten"	
2020	"Corn"	-
2021	"Gang Sh*t"	-
2023	"Rent Free"	-
2023	"Shade"	-

Mixtapes and albums

Year	Title	References
2007	The New Chapter (hosted by SK Vibemaker)	-
2008	No Comparisons	-
2009	Big Trouble in Little London (hosted by SK Vibemaker)	-
2011	I am Legend (hosted by DJ Limelight)	-
2012	I am Legend II (hosted by DJ Limelight)	-
2013	Cuts & Salt	-
2014	Holy Sinners	-
2017	This Woman	-

EPs

Year	Title	References
2011	He Said, She Said: I Am Bad	-
2011	Drop Me Out	-
2012	Flowcaine	-
2012	Rebellion	-
2014	Holy Sinners	-
2016	Grime, Guts & Glory (with Kid D)	-
2017	This Woman	-
2021	Kalas	-

Guest appearances

Year	Title	References
2006	"Black Dirt"/"Fuck Disco" (ft. NoLay) single by The Bumblebeez, 1 track	-
2008	Low Deep - Star (ft. NoLay) album, Unsung, 1 track	-
2009	Better Than Heavy album, Mongrel, 2 tracks	-
2014	Adrian Thaws album, Tricky, 2 tracks	-
2020	Brave album, JOYRYDE, 1 track	-
2021	"All Night" (ft. Nolay) single by Trampa, 1 track	-
