= Soundtrack to the Struggle =

Studio album by Lowkey
- Released: 16 October 2011
- Recorded: 2009–2011
- Genre: British hip hop; political hip hop
- Length: 95:08
- Label: Mesopotamia Music
- Producer: BeatNick; Big G (Juxta); Guy Bass; JetSun; K-Salaam; Last Resort; Nutty P; Quincey Tones; Red Skull; Show N Prove; Sivey; Vendetta

Lowkey chronology
Dear Listener (2008)	Soundtrack to the Struggle (2011)	Soundtrack to the Struggle 2 (2019)

Singles from Soundtrack to the Struggle
- 1. "Voices of the Voiceless" Released: 16 August 2009; 2. "Long Live Palestine" Released: 16 December 2009; 3. "Something Wonderful" Released: 10 February 2010; 4. "Obama Nation" Released: 8 April 2010

Professional ratings
Review scores
Source	Rating
RapReviews	7.0/10 stars
SB.TV	(favourable)

Soundtrack to the Struggle is the second studio album by British rapper Lowkey. It was released on 16 October 2011 independently on the Lowkey-founded label Mesopotamia Music. It is the follow-up to his 2008 album Dear Listener. Four singles were released to promote the album from 2009 to 2010. Production for the album took place during 2009 to 2011 and was handled by Red Skull, Big G, Nutty P, K-Salaam, Last Resort, Show N Prove, among others. It includes guest appearances from Immortal Technique, Mai Khalil, M1, Black the Ripper, Klashnekoff, and more. The album entered the UK Albums Chart at number 57 on 23 October 2011 – becoming Lowkey's first national chart entry. It is regarded as one of the greatest albums in the UK hip-hop scene.

== Background ==
Music videos were created for the songs "Something Wonderful", "Obama Nation", "Cradle of Civilisation", "Blood, Sweat and Tears", "Million Man March", "Terrorist?", "My Soul", "Too Much", "Obama Nation Pt. 2" and "Hand on Your Gun" prior to the release of the album, while visuals for "Soundtrack to the Struggle" and "Dear England" were released after the release.

While discussing the name of the album to BBC Radio 1Xtra presenter Charlie Sloth, Lowkey said: "It comes from my position in the game is as an artist, trying to do my thing independently. It is a struggle – it's not easy. We have barriers placed in front of us at every single level. And so we have to fight for everything we get. As an artist I've never had anything put on a plate for me. I've had to struggle to put my music out there." And also added that; "it's about the widest struggle that I am part of, which what I feel is to wake people up to the humanity of people that we are encouraged to ignore every day." On the subject of the album, Lowkey commented that: "The album has just got a lot of heartfelt music that is really and truly an expression of me. Say I died tomorrow, I want this album to be the last thing I say to the world and I want people to remember it and to recognize it as me. No one else."

Track 8 off the album, "Dreamers", premiered on BBC Radio 1Xtra on 24 September 2011. Lowkey described the meaning of the song: "The track is about people with mental illness. Because I've known people that have issues with mental illnesses and is quite common. Like I say at the beginning there is people that see things that aren't there, and ask why not. Because they see further than a lot of people that are perceived as normal." Track 22, "Obama Nation (Pt. 2)" samples a lyric from the political hip hop song "Words I Never Said" by Lupe Fiasco, which Lowkey got permission to use via the social networking and microblogging service Twitter by Lupe.

== Singles ==
From 2009 to 2010 three singles were released from the album. The first single, "Voices of the Voiceless" featuring American rapper Immortal Technique, was released on 16 August 2009 (Amazon) and 21 September 2009 (iTunes) for digital download. The next single, "Long Live Palestine", released on 16 December 2009 (Amazon) and 1 January 2010 (iTunes). A sequel to "Long Live Palestine" was released together with Part 1 as an EP on iTunes but Part 2 is not included on the album. "Something Wonderful", was released as the third single on 10 February 2010 (Amazon) and 1 March 2010 (iTunes) and the fourth single "Obama Nation" released on 8 April 2010 on Amazon, and was later released on iTunes on 3 May 2010.

== Commercial performance ==
Soundtrack to the Struggle performed well in the download charts. The album's highest digital peak in the UK currently stands at number 8, number 52 in Canada, number 69 in Australia and #79 in the US. On iTunes the album charted in the Hip Hop Album Chart; debuting at #1 in the UK, #3 in Canada, #4 in Australia and #8 in the US. The album was expected charted at #33 in the national UK Albums Chart (compiled by The Official Charts Company) according to the midweek chart of 19 October 2011 but didn't manage to chart in the Top 40 – entering at number 57. In the UK Download Chart, Soundtrack to the Struggle peaked higher than its UK Albums Chart position – at number 14. And in the UK R&B Chart, the album received its highest OCC position, number 6. In the UK Indie Chart, the album peaked at number 9.

== Track listing ==
The official track listing released in May 2011.

No.	Title	Producer(s)	Length
1.	"Soundtrack to the Struggle"	Nutty P; Guy Bass^{[b]}	5:16
2.	"Too Much" (featuring Shadia Mansour)	Nutty P; Guy Bass^{[b]}	3:54
3.	"Voices of the Voiceless" (featuring Immortal Technique)	Sivey	4:26
4.	"Hand on Your Gun"	Show N Prove	2:46
5.	"Skit 1" (performed by Jeremiah Wright)		2:14
6.	"Terrorist?"	Red Skull	4:41
7.	"Something Wonderful"	Red Skull	4:16
8.	"Dreamers" (featuring Mai Khalil)	Last Resort	3:40
9.	"Skit 2" (performed by Tariq Ali)		1:38
10.	"Obama Nation"	Red Skull	3:13
11.	"Skit 3" (performed by John McCain)		0:32
12.	"Cradle of Civilisation" (featuring Mai Khalil)	Quincey Tones	5:10
13.	"Skit 4" (performed by Ben Affleck and Bill Maher)		1:10
14.	"Blood, Sweat and Tears" (featuring Klashnekoff)	Nutty P	4:05
15.	"Everything I Am"	Show N Prove	3:18
16.	"Skit 5" (performed by Norman Finkelstein)		2:53
17.	"Long Live Palestine"	Nutty P; Guy Bass^{[b]}	4:09
18.	"We Will Rise" (featuring Sanasino)	Big G (Juxta)	3:48
19.	"My Soul"	Vendetta	3:50
20.	"Skit 6" (performed by Mike Prysner)		1:46
21.	"The Butterfly Effect" (featuring Adrian)	BeatNick; K-Salaam	3:30
22.	"Obama Nation (Pt. 2)^{[a]}" (featuring M-1 and Black the Ripper)	Nutty P	3:40
23.	"Dear England" (featuring Mai Khalil)	BeatNick; K-Salaam	5:25
24.	"Haunted" (featuring Mai Khalil)	JetSun; Guy Bass^{[b]}	4:40
25.	"Terrorist? (Pt. 2)" (featuring Crazy Haze and Mai Khalil)	Last Resort	5:44
26.	"Million Man March" (featuring Mai Khalil)	Big G (Juxta)	5:24
Total length:			95:08

Notes

- ^{^[a]}"Obama Nation (Pt. 2)" is unavailable on digital versions of the album.
- ^{^[b]} signifies an additional producer
- All tracks mixed and mastered by Guy Buss.

Sample credits

- "Soundtrack to the Struggle" contains a sample of "Change Right Now", written and performed by Mavado
- "Too Much" contains elements of "Take Too Much", written and performed by Lauryn Hill
- "Voice of the Voiceless" contains samples of "A Fantastic Piece of Architecture", written and performed by Bloodrock
- "Hand on Your Gun" contains a sample of "A Gringo Like Me", as performed by Peter Tevis
- "Something Wonderful" contains elements of "You Do Something To Me", as performed by Paul Weller
- "Dreamers" contains a sample of "To Zion", written and performed by Lauryn Hill
- "Obama Nation, (Pt. 2)" contains a sample from "Words I Never Said", written and performed Lupe Fiasco
- "Everything I Am" contains a sample of "The Colors of the Night", as performed by Lauren Christy
- "We Will Rise" contains the melody from "A Song from a Secret Garden" by Dreamcatcher
- "Dear England" uses the hook and melody of "In a manner of speaking...love" by Novelle Vague

== Music videos ==
- Soundtrack to the Struggle
- Too Much
- Hand on Your Gun
- Terrorist?
- Something Wonderful
- Obama Nation
- Cradle of Civilisation
- Blood, Sweat and Tears
- Long Live Palestine
- My Soul
- Obama Nation (Pt. 2)
- Dear England
- Million Man March

== Charts ==
Chart (2011)	Peak position
UK Albums (OCC)	57
UK Album Downloads (OCC)	14
UK Independent Albums (OCC)	9
UK R&B Albums (OCC)	6

== Release history ==
Region	Date	Format	Label
United Kingdom	16 October 2011	Digital download; CD	Mesopotamia Music
United States	16 October 2011	Digital download; CD	Mesopotamia Music
