= Wordplay (disambiguation) =

Wordplay is a literary technique in which the nature of the words used themselves become part of the subject of the work.

Wordplay may also refer to:

== Film and television ==
- Wordplay (film), a 2006 documentary film about crossword puzzles
- Wordplay (game show), a game show that ran on NBC from 1986 to 1987
- Wordplay (British game show), a puzzle-based game show that ran on Five in 2009
- "Wordplay" (The Twilight Zone), an episode of the television series The New Twilight Zone
- Wordplay (website), a website run by screenwriters Ted Elliott and Terry Rossio

== Music ==
- Wordplay (musician), a British musician
- Wordplay (album), a music album by the Christian parody band Apologetix
- "Wordplay" (song), a song from the album Mr. A-Z, written by Jason Mraz
