= Don't Cry (Bugzy Malone and Dermot Kennedy song) =

Single by Bugzy Malone and Dermot Kennedy

from the album The Resurrection
- Released: 20 November 2020
- Length: 2:47
- Label: B-Somebody
- Songwriter: Bugzy Malone
- Producers: Rhymez; Silkey

Bugzy Malone singles chronology
"Doe'd Up" (2020)	"Don't Cry" (2020)	"Notorious" (2021)

Dermot Kennedy singles chronology
"Power" (2020)	"Don't Cry" (2020)	"Better Days" (2021)

"Don't Cry" is a song by British rapper and actor Bugzy Malone and Irish singer-songwriter and musician Dermot Kennedy. It was released on 20 November 2020 as the third single from Malone's second studio album The Resurrection. The song was written by Bugzy Malone.

== Background ==
"They tell me I’m lucky to be alive but although I sustained serious injuries at the time I lost consciousness so I don’t remember much, what I do remember is the non-stop love, and just want to say thanks for all the well wishes and prayers you lot caught me off guard with all the support!"

— "Bugzy Malone shares powerful new track 'Don't Cry' and announces new album 'The Resurrection'", NME

== Music video ==
A music video to accompany the release of "Don't Cry" was first released onto YouTube on 19 November 2020. The video was directed by Myles Whittingham. The video shows a boxing match which reflects Bugzy Malone's journey since an almost fatal motorbike crash, which happened the previous year.

== Personnel ==
Credits adapted from Tidal.

- Rhymez – producer
- Silkey – producer
- Bugzy Malone – vocals, composer, lyricist
- Dermot Kennedy – vocals, author
- Stadelta – mastering engineer, mixer, studio personnel

== Charts ==
Chart performance for "Don't Cry"
Chart (2020)	Peak position
Ireland (IRMA)	25
UK Singles (OCC)	77
