= King of the North (EP) =

EP by Bugzy Malone
- Released: 14 July 2017
- Recorded: 2017
- Genre: Grime; garage; hip hop
- Length: 30:15
- Label: Ill Gotten
- Producer: Ali Karim; DJ Luck; ILL Gotten Records; S-X; Shift K3Y; Toddla T; Z.Dot

Bugzy Malone chronology
Facing Time (2016)	King of the North (2017)	B. Inspired (2018)

Singles from King of the North
- 1. "Aggy Wid It" Released: 17 February 2017; 2. "Through The Night" Released: 18 May 2017; 3. "Bruce Wayne" Released: 29 June 2017

King of the North is the third EP by UK grime rapper Bugzy Malone. The EP was released on 14 July 2017 by Ill Gotten Records, which is an independent record label set up by Malone.

The album consists of eight tracks and was released after Malone's Part 2 Fire in the Booth on BBC Radio 1 Xtra with Charlie Sloth. It was certified silver by the British Phonographic Industry (BPI), recognising it earning 60,000 album-equivalent units. The album had three charting singles, "Through the Night", "Memory Lane" and "Bruce Wayne", charting at numbers 92, 74 and 99, respectively.

The guest appearances for the album include Tom Grennan and DJ Luck & MC Neat with an uncredited appearance from Shola Ama. All songs on the album were classified as explicit. The main producers on the album were DJ Luck, Shift K3Y and Z.Dot. Others producers involved were Ali Karim, S-X and Toddla T. For the music videos uploaded for the album, the directors were Connor Hamilton, G.Kuba and Wayne Lennox.

== Track listing ==
King of the North track listing
No.	Title	Writer(s)	Producer(s)	Length
1.	"King of the North"	Aaron Davies	Ill Gotten Records	3:27
2.	"Aggy wid it"	Davies	Zdot	3:26
3.	"Make or Break"	Davies; Shola Ama	Toddla T	4:27
4.	"Through the Night" (featuring DJ Luck & MC Neat)	Davies; Joel Samuels; Michael Rose	Zdot; DJ Luck	4:25
5.	"We Don't Play"	Davies	S-X	3:37
6.	"Memory Lane" (featuring Tom Grennan)	Davies; Tom Grennan	Shift K3Y	3:31
7.	"Bruce Wayne"	Davies	Ali Karim	3:47
8.	"Sniper"	Davies	Ill Gotten Records	3:35
Total length:				30:15

== Charts ==
Chart performance for King of the North
Chart (2017)	Peak position
Scottish Albums (OCC)	22
UK Albums (OCC)	4
UK Independent Albums (OCC)	1
UK R&B Albums (OCC)	1

== Certifications ==
Certifications for King of the North
Region	Certification	Certified units/sales
United Kingdom (BPI)	Gold	100,000^{‡}
^{‡} Sales+streaming figures based on certification alone.
