= The Great British Dream =

Studio album by Bugzy Malone
- Released: 10 May 2024
- Genres: Grime; hip hop
- Length: 50:29
- Label: B. Somebody
- Producers: 501 Productions; Blinkie; Charlie Danso; Da Beatfreakz; Ghosty; GW the Producer; Jacob Manson; Jahmori Simmons; Jojo F Music; LiTek; mashyybeats; Rhymez; Second to Your Sound Mind; TeeDee; Vxsma; WhYJay; X10; Young Chencs

Bugzy Malone chronology
The Resurrection (2021)	The Great British Dream (2024)

Singles from The Great British Dream
- 1. "Out of Nowhere" Released: 11 November 2022; 2. "Ghetto Wisdom" Released: 8 February 2024; 3. "Ladies" Released: 22 February 2024; 4. "Daily Duppy" Released: 21 March 2024; 5. "Old Friends" Released: 11 April 2024; 6. "Beauty & The Beast II" Released: 10 May 2024

The Great British Dream is the third studio album by English grime rapper Bugzy Malone. It was released on 10 May 2024 by Malone's independent label B. Somebody and follows his 2021 album, The Resurrection. The album features guest appearances from GRM Daily and TeeDee.

The album debuted at number 13 on the UK Albums Chart, number 2 on the UK R&B Singles and Albums Charts, number 3 on the UK Independent Albums Chart and number 29 on the Scottish Albums Chart.

== Singles ==
The album's lead single, "Out of Nowhere" with TeeDee, was released 11 November 2022. The single charted at number 9 on the UK Singles Chart, number 4 on the UK R&B Singles and Albums Charts, number 1 on UK Independent Singles Charts and number 14 on the Irish Charts. The single was certified silver by the BPI on 27 January 2023 and then certified gold on 16 June 2023.

The second single, "Ghetto Wisdom", was released 8 February 2024. The third single, "Ladies", was released 22 February 2024. The fourth single "Daily Duppy" featuring GRM Daily was released 21 March 2024. The fifth single, "Old Friends", was released 11 April 2024. The album's sixth and final single, "Beauty & The Beast II" the sequel to the acclaimed 2016 single "Beauty and the Beast", was released 10 May 2024. The single charted at number 47 on the UK Independent Singles Charts.

== Track Listing ==
The Great British Dream track listing
No.	Title	Writer(s)	Producer(s)	Length
1.	"The Great British Dream"	Aaron Davies	GW the Producer; Young Chencs	3:38
2.	"Big Steppin"	Davies	GW the Producer; X10	4:37
3.	"Beauty & the Beast II"	Davies	GW the Producer; Young Chencs; Jacob Menson; LiTek; WhYJay	2:54
4.	"Undisputed"	Davies	Rhymez	3:05
5.	"Movie Star (Skit)"	Davies	GW the Producer	0:55
6.	"Movie Star"	Davies	GW the Producer; 501 productions	3:35
7.	"Lose You"	Davies	Da Beatfreakz; Jahmori Simmons; GW the Producer	3:32
8.	"Daily Duppy" (featuring GRM Daily)	Davies	Jojo F Music	4:19
9.	"Blessed You"	Davies	Jojo F Music	2:59
10.	"Ladies"	Davies	GW the Producer; Ghosty; Sound to Your Mind	3:11
11.	"Ghetto Wisdom"	Davies	Young Chencs; Vxsma; mashyybeats	4:47
12.	"Ego (Skit)"	Davies	GW the Producer; CharlieDanso	1:09
13.	"Ego"	Davies	GW the Producer	4:18
14.	"Old Friends"	Davies	Blinkie	4:34
15.	"Out of Nowhere" (with TeeDee)	Davies; Tom Dempsey; Benjamin Pettit; Niomi McLean-Daley	TeeDee	2:51
Total length:				53:49

== Charts ==
Chart performance for The Great British Dream
Chart (2024)	Peak position
Scottish Albums (Official Charts)	29
UK Albums (Official Charts)	13
UK Independent Albums (Official Charts)	3
UK R&B Albums (Official Charts)	2
