= Dear Listener =

Studio album by Lowkey
- Released: 20 October 2008
- Recorded: 2007–2008
- Genre: Hip hop
- Length: 42:03
- Label: SO Empire Recordings
- Producer: Scram Jones, Nutty P, Faith SFX, Sivey, Quincey Tones, Dockmini, Styalz Fuego

Lowkey chronology
Dear Listener (2008)	Soundtrack to the Struggle (2011)

Professional ratings
Review scores
Source	Rating
BBC	(favourable)
Style43	(favourable)
rapreviews	(7.5/10)
Britishhiphop	(favourable)
rago magazine	(favourable)
FACT magazine	(8/10)

Dear Listener is the debut album by English MC Lowkey. The album was released after 3 mixtapes by Lowkey. In support of the album, music videos for "Alphabet Assassin", "Revolution", "Relatives" and "In My Lifetime" which features Wretch 32 were made. The album was released on 20 October 2008 through independent label SO Empire Recordings. The album didn't manage to chart.

== Track listing ==
No.	Title	Producer(s)	Length
1.	"Dear Listener"	Sivey	3:11
2.	"Tell Me Why"	Quincey Tones	3:06
3.	"Rise and Fall"	Dockmini	3:54
4.	"I'm Back"	Scram Jones	3:10
5.	"Alphabet Assassin"	Nutty P	4:26
6.	"Special"	Sivey	3:13
7.	"Revolution" (featuring Jon McClure, Faith SFX and Mic Righteous)	Faith SFX	3:15
8.	"Everything Must Change"	Sivey	2:58
9.	"The Essence"	Styalz Fuego	2:42
10.	"Relatives" (featuring Logic)	Sivey	4:51
11.	"In My Lifetime" (featuring Wretch 32)	Quincey Tones	3:10
12.	"I Believe" (featuring Eden Rox)	Sivey	4:07
Total length:			42:03

== Music videos ==
- Alphabet Assassin
- Revolution
- Relatives
- In My Lifetime
