= Out of Nowhere (Bugzy Malone & TeeDee song) =

Single by Bugzy Malone and TeeDee

from the album The Great British Dream
- Released: 11 November 2022
- Genre: House; rap
- Length: 2:51
- Label: B-Somebody
- Songwriter: Bugzy Malone
- Producer: TeeDee

Bugzy Malone singles chronology
"Energy" (2022)	"Out of Nowhere" (2022)	"All Of Me (Do For Love)" (2023)

TeeDee singles chronology
"Us for Life" (2022)	"Out of Nowhere" (2022)	"Wile Out of Nowhere" (2022)

"Out of Nowhere" is a song by British rapper and actor Bugzy Malone and British producer TeeDee. It was released on 11 November 2022 as the lead single from Malone's third studio album The Great British Dream. As of June 2024 the song has surpassed 63 million streams on Spotify.

== Background ==
"The collaboration came about through social media… TeeDee, whose creative videos have led to viral success on TikTok and Instagram, crafted the sound and encouraged his followers to tag Bugzy to get his attention. The ploy worked beautifully – Bugzy caught wind of the beat, linked up with TeeDee and did his thing. The rest is history."

— "BUGZY MALONE AND TEEDEE TEAM UP AND BRING THE ENERGY IN HOT NEW TRACK “OUT OF NOWHERE”, GRM Daily

== Music video ==
A music video was released on November 10 2022, to accompany the single's release and was uploaded to the Bugzy Malone channel on YouTube. The music video shows a house party at Malone's mansion. As of June 2024 the video has achieved over 17 million views.

== Personnel ==
Credits adapted from Tidal.

- TeeDee – producer
- Bugzy Malone – songwriter, vocals, composer, lyricist
- Benjamin Pettit – composer
- Niomi Arleen Mclean-Daley – composer

== Charts ==
Chart performance for "Out of Nowhere"
Chart (2022)	Peak position
Ireland (IRMA)	14
UK Singles (Official Charts)	9
UK R&B Albums (Official Charts)	4
UK Independent Albums (Official Charts)	1

== Certifications ==
Certifications for "Out of Nowhere"
Region	Certification	Certified units/sales
United Kingdom (BPI)	Platinum	600,000^{‡}
^{‡} Sales+streaming figures based on certification alone.
