= Walk with Me (Bugzy Malone EP) =

Walk With Me

EP by Bugzy Malone
- Released: July 24, 2015
- Genre: Grime
- Length: 26:12
- Label: Grimey Limey
- Producer: Zdot; Krunchie; Rude Kid; Mr SnoWman; Thomas Mellor

Bugzy Malone chronology
Stereotyped (2015)	Walk With Me (2015)	Facing Time (2016)

Walk With Me is the debut EP by Bugzy Malone. The EP entered the UK Albums Chart at number eight. The EP was released on July 24, 2015. The EP was released on independent record label Grimey Limey.

== Track listing ==
Walk with Me track listing
No.	Title	Producer(s)	Length
1.	"Ready to Blow"	Zdot; Krunchie	3:22
2.	"Watch Your Mouth"	Rude Kid	3:01
3.	"M.E.N"	Mr SnoWman	4:00
4.	"Get Gassed"	Zdot; Krunchie	2:57
5.	"Pain"	Thomas Mellor	3:41
6.	"Get Paid"	Zdot	2:46
7.	"Pagans"	Zdot; Krunchie	3:53
8.	"Walk with Me"	Zdot	3:52

== Charts ==
Chart performance for Walk with Me
Chart (2015)	Peak position
Scottish Albums (OCC)	65
UK Albums (OCC)	8
UK Independent Albums (OCC)	2
UK R&B Albums (OCC)	2
