= Aylward Academy =

Lift Aylward

Location
- Windmill Road; Enfield, Middlesex, N18 1NB; England; 51°39′58″N 0°02′12″W

Information
- Type: Academy
- Motto: Find your remarkable
- Established: 1927
- Department for Education URN: 136147 Tables
- Ofsted: Reports
- Principal: Lauren Savage - Acting Principal ‍
- Gender: Mixed
- Age: 11 to 19
- Enrolment: 1600
- Houses: Banksy, Hawking, Rowling, Mandela
- Website: http://www.aylwardacademy.org/

Aylward Academy (formerly Gladys Aylward School) is a mixed secondary school and sixth form in Edmonton, in the London Borough of Enfield for students aged 11 to 18. Since September 2010, it has been an academy sponsored by the Lift Schools. Remo Iafrate succeeded Jonathan Gillard as Principal. Dele Rotimi succeeded Remo Iafrate in September 2021. In 2024 Joseph Lawlor became Principal.

== History ==
The former Higher Grade School started in 1927 in temporary quarters at Raynham School. Originally known as Silver Street School before moving to a new building in Wilbury Way in 1967. The school became a comprehensive and was renamed Weir Hall School, from which time the former Hazelbury Secondary Modern was used as a lower school until replaced by the present building in Windmill Road in 1972. The school was then renamed Aylward School in honour of the missionary Gladys Aylward who had grown up in nearby Cheddington Road. After 2005 the school was renamed after her full name once it became an Academy.

=== Principals (Past to Present) ===
- Present: Lauren Savage - Acting Principal ‍
- Joseph Lawlor
- Dele Rotimi
- Remo Iafrate (Executive Principal - Nightingale Academy)
- Johnathan Gillard

== Ofsted and academic performance ==
in 2021 Aylward was inspected by Ofsted under the new framework and was found to be good in all areas.

Aylward Academy has received two School Achievement Awards from the DfE in recognition of progress made in the past, in 2005 it received the Leading Parent Partnership award, and in March 2006, was awarded Artsmark Gold accreditation. The academy has a long established accredited partnership with Middlesex University. The school also had a role in Enfield's part in the 2012 Olympics. It also has accreditation for Partnership in Action which recognizes the broad range of Work Related Learning activities in which the school has participated.

In its November 2012 Ofsted inspection, Aylward was judged to be good in every category. In its July 2016 Ofsted report the Academy again received a 'Good', the fourth 'Good' received by the Academy since its inception in 2010.

== Notable pupils ==
- Neale Fenn, footballer
- Yasin Hassan Omar, Islamic terrorist, perpetrator of the 21 July 2005 London bombings
- Black the Ripper, rapper and cannabis activist
- Leroy James, the youngest stabbing victim in London in 2011, was a year 9 student of Aylward Academy at the time of the incident
