= Facing Time =

EP by Bugzy Malone
- Released: June 3, 2016
- Genre: Grime
- Length: 25:52
- Label: Ill Gotten
- Producers: Craggle Beats; Fumez the Engineer; Hey Gamal; ILL Gotten Records; Nateprophet; Rude Kid; S-X; Soft Play; Thomas Mellor; Zdot

Bugzy Malone chronology
Walk with Me (2015)	Facing Time (2016)	King of the North (2017)

Singles from Facing Time
- 1. "Beauty and the Beast" Released: 3 June 2016

Facing Time is the second EP by Bugzy Malone. It was released 3 June 2016 and follows his debut EP Walk with Me. The EP debuted at number 6 on the UK Albums Chart, number 2 on the UK R&B Albums Charts, number 1 on the UK Independent Singles and Albums Charts and number 33 on the Scottish Albums Chart.

== Reception ==
The track "Beauty and the Beast" became the biggest and most recognisable song from the album hitting number 37 on the UK Independent Singles and Albums Charts and was certified silver by the BPI on 23 February 2018, then gold on 10 July 2020 and then platinum on 27 October 2023.

== Track listing ==
Facing Time track listing
No.	Title	Writer(s)	Producer(s)	Length
1.	"Facing Time"	Aaron Davies	Thomas Mellor	3:41
2.	"Late Night in the 0161"	Davies	ILL Gotten Records; Fumez The Engineer	3:09
3.	"Moving"	Davies	Cragglebeats; Nateprophet	3:17
4.	"Gone Clear"	Davies	S-X	3:14
5.	"Beauty and the Beast"	Davies; Esmaail Ali Karim	Hey Gamal	3:16
6.	"I Suggest"	Davies	Soft Play; Zdot	3:00
7.	"Mosh Pit Gang"	Davies	Rude Kid	3:13
8.	"We Don't Care"	Davies	Ill Gotten Records	2:59
Total length:				25:52

== Charts ==
Chart performance for Facing Time
Chart (2016)	Peak position
Scottish Albums (Official Charts)	33
UK Albums (Official Charts)	6
UK Independent Albums (Official Charts)	1
UK R&B Albums (Official Charts)	2
