= Black the Ripper =

British rapper and cannabis activist

- Also known as: Ital Samson; Samson; Blackaveli; Black
- Born: Dean West; 28 December 1986; Edmonton, London, England
- Died: April 2020 (aged 33) St. John's, Montserrat
- Genres: British hip hop; grime; political hip hop
- Occupations: Rapper; singer; songwriter
- Instrument: Vocals
- Years active: 2003–2020
- Label: Dank of England (D.O.E.) Black Magic Entertainment
- Website: dankofengland.net

Dean West (28 December 1986 – April 2020), better known by his stage name Black the Ripper, was a British rapper, grime emcee, activist, cannabis activist, and entrepreneur from Edmonton, London. He ran his own record label, Dank of England (formerly known as Black Magic Entertainment), which expanded into a clothing line and cannabis accessory company. He was also known for his viral stunts of smoking cannabis in public places, which he hoped would lead to the outcome of legalised cannabis in the United Kingdom.

West was one of the earliest artists to adopt the grime genre, where he gained recognition from his mixtapes Holla Black (2006), Summer Madness (2007) and Afro Samurai (2008). He was also one of the earliest artists to have been featured on the British urban music channel SB.TV. West released multiple mixtapes series during his career, most notably Black Is Beautiful and Outlaw. He gained mainstream attention whilst campaigning for the legality of cannabis in the United Kingdom in 2015 with the launch of his debut EP Excuse Me Whilst I Kiss Sky. He went on to release two more EPs: In Dank We Trust and Doe or Die before the release of his debut studio album Money Grows on Trees, which was released in August 2018 via his independent label, Dank of England.

On 6 April 2020, West's body was found in the holiday home he was staying in on the Caribbean island of Montserrat. An investigation was opened to determine his cause of death. On 7 July 2020, his family confirmed that the autopsy had shown that his death was due to a heart attack.

== Early life ==
West was born to parents of Guyanese and Montserratian descent within the north London suburb of Edmonton. During his teen years he attended Aylward School; however, he dropped out at the age of 16. Although he stated that he was not really a football fan, he was a loyal supporter of Arsenal F.C. and had been since a young age as his father was also a supporter of the team.

== Career ==
=== 2003–2007: Career beginnings ===
West made his music career debut in 2003 at the age of 15. He did so by participating in grime battles at pirate radio station Axe FM, where he had clashes against various competitors consistently. Black frequented the station with grime collectives Rowdy Squad and X Camp but it was when Axe FM owner Pabz created a clash competition that gained West considerable attention. In an interview with MTV, he stated that Tupac Shakur, Biggie Smalls, Mobb Deep, Busta Rhymes, Nas and Bob Marley inspired him to make music. When asked about his passion for making music, West declared that he had a love for music. His most notable single during this time was "Death is Promised" released in 2005. West also stated that his music is inspired by historical and often political figures such as Malcolm X and Martin Luther King Jr. He released his debut mixtape Motivation Music: Volume 1 on New Years Day 2007, sophomore mixtape Motivation Music: Volume 2 on 1 March 2007, third mixtape Summer Madness on 7 February 2007 to little success His fourth mixtape Holla Black followed on 7 March 2007 and is now considered a classic album in the genre of grime.

=== 2008–2012: Rise to fame ===
West was one of the earliest artists to record for SB.TV, having released numerous freestyles and bars session alongside ASB, Chip, Ghetts amongst others. Many of these freestyles were compiled and put on his debut compilation album The Edmonton Dream, released on 28 December 2009. The album contained 60 tracks with features from numerous grime MC's including DJ Ironik, Wiley and Chip, amongst others.

He was featured on the All Stars remix of the single "SB.TV" by Flexplicit and Royce da 5'9" alongside Lady Leshurr, Mic Righteous & Shotty released in January 2011. During the time of the 2011 London riot, West spoke out on the scenario, asserting how he didn't support it, stating that those who weren't living in affected areas, had no right to comment on the riots, and that the action of those involved was selfish and inconsiderate. He released his sixth mixtape Outlaw: Volume 1 on 28 March 2011 with vocal features from Wiley, Frisco and more. Black is Beautiful: Volume 1, which was initially released in 2005, was made available for digital download the same day. West performed at A Day in Dam with English Frank and Big Narstie in 2013 and the Hip Hop Kemp Festival in Czech Republic.

The following year he released three more mixtapes. This includes his eighth; Married to Marijuana which included 13 tracks of his love to marijuana, and the compilation album Unreleased S**t: Volume 3. His tenth mixtape; Black Is Beautiful: Volume 2 was released on 31 October 2012. The 13 track mixtape, contained features from Dot Rotten, Loudmouth, Shystie, amongst others.

=== 2013–2016: Excuse Me Whilst I Kiss Sky ===
West's 11th mixtape, High End Weed Music was a joint effort with Iron Barz and was released on 20 April 2014. It was his second work to be dedicated to cannabis culture. On 29 August 2014, West released the second installment to his Political hip hop mixtape series Outlaw. Volume 2 contained features from Lowkey, Akala, Jaja Soze, Benny Banks and more. High End 2 followed on 14 December 2014.

West released his debut EP titled Excuse Me Whilst I Kiss Sky. The seven-track EP was released on 4 May 2015 and featured vocal appearances from Iron Barz, L Skinz, and Jyager. West gained national recognition for a viral stunt with Trollstation to create a music video on the London Eye at 4:20 pm, where they filmed each other smoking and dancing inside the enclosure on 20 April 2016 (the date also being "4/20" in American date format). West released a "Weed Remix" of Uber Everywhere entitled "Light Up Everywhere" in April 2016.

=== 2017–2020: Money Grows on Trees ===
West was featured on Benny Banks and Joe Black's collaborative mixtape BNB released in 2017. In celebration of 420, West released a surprise EP titled In Dank We Trust. Another independently released album, West enlisted Iron Barz, Stoner, Footsie and others to provide vocal features on the album. On 1 October 2017, West released his second EP Doe or Die: Volume 1. West strategically sold the album at a price of £4.20, in light of the cannabis culture once again.

In 2018, West released the single "Bill It", with vocal features from Big Narstie, Chip and Smasher. West made an appearance on the single Marijuana by Chip and Mist, a song that was voted as one of the best grime songs of 2018 by Capital XTRA. The single went on to be the lead single on his new project; Money Grows on Trees released in August 2018. His love of marijuana is a running theme throughout the album. The album opens with the song "My Name is Black The Ripper" in which West introduces his persona to new fans over a few seconds long intro. The song acts as a quick introduction to the artist before the start of the album.

In 2019, West performed at the Colours Community Festival held in February. Durung that time he announced that he was working on the sequel to his last EP Doe or Die. Shortly after, it was announced that Doe or Die: Volume 2 would be released on 12 October 2019. The album was another collaborative effort with Iron Barz.

=== Legacy and influence ===
West has had an influence on contemporary UK rap music. His studio album Money Grows on Trees has been cited as an influence to the new generation of UK rap, including Capo Lee.

Rimzee titled his 2019 album "The Upper Clapton Dream" after being influenced by Black The Ripper's mixtape titled "The Edmonton Dream".

Black the Ripper's single "Sunset" was released on what would have been his 34th birthday, 28 December 2020. The visuals were released alongside the visuals and featured D.O.E. affiliate Iron Barz via GRM Daily.

== Ventures ==
=== Dank of England (D.O.E.) ===
In 2015, West launched his own company known as Dank of England (D.O.E.). Dank of England runs as an independent record label and produces a clothing line, as well as smoking accessories. It runs as a reboot of his former independent label, Black Magic Entertainment. The launch has been very successful, and alongside co-founder and partner; Screechtree, the pair had been running pop-up shops on a seasonal basis since 2017. Black gained national recognition for a viral stunt with Trollstation to create a music video on the London Eye on 4/20, where they filmed each other smoking and dancing inside the enclosure in November 2016. Black's D.O.E. was noted for being "the most pro-cannabis and British a company can get" by The Irish News. During this time West was featured in Vice's documentary; How Weed Laws are Failing the UK released on 24 October 2016. West credited his weed smoking as an influence on his business success and that his stunts were a form of activism to legalise weed. EasyJet banned Black for smoking on the plane to which he responded "I prefer RyanAir anyways." Black also smoked weed in his local Asda store. West released a "Weed Remix" of Uber Everywhere entitled "Light Up Everywhere" in April 2016.

== Death ==
On 6 April 2020, it was reported that West had died while on holiday in Montserrat. According to sources, he was found dead in the holiday home he was staying in. He was said to be 32 years old at the time of his death. The following day an autopsy was ordered by a coroner and the Royal Montserrat Police launched a full investigation into the cause of his death. On 7 July 2020, his family confirmed that the autopsy had shown that his death was due to a heart attack.

=== Aftermath ===
Longtime collaborators Chip, Lowkey and Ghetts were among those who paid tribute to West, as well as Novelist, Skepta, Krept, Lethal Bizzle, Michael Dapaah, Yungen, Nadia Rose, AJ Tracey and Ambush. Musician Jammer released a tribute single titled "Hope Dealers" in light of the death of West. The single was co-produced by Jammer and Skully with Jammer delivering downtempo lyrics. Chip released a tribute for Black the Ripper titled "0420" on 20 April 2020, a double entendre in light of the cannabis culture and the death anniversary of West. The song sampled Black the Ripper's single "Missing You".

== Discography ==
=== Studio albums ===
- 2018: Money Grows on Trees

=== Extended plays ===
- 2013: Married to Marijuana
- 2014: High End Weed Music (with Iron Barz)
- 2014: High End 2 (with Iron Barz)
- 2015: Excuse Me Whilst I Kiss Sky
- 2017: In Dank We Trust
- 2017: Doe or Die: Volume 1
- 2019: Doe or Die: Volume 2

== See also ==
- List of cannabis rights leaders
