= Wordplay (musician) =

- Born: Tao Rogers-Wright; 11 November 1984 (age 41)
- Origin: South London, England
- Genres: Hip hop
- Occupations: Actor, hip hop artist
- Years active: 1998–present

Wordplay (born Tao Rogers-Wright, 11 November 1984) is a musician and actor of mixed British and Black African descent.

== Early life ==
Wordplay was born Tao Rogers-Wright in the south of London, where he grew up with his mother until their eventual move to the west of the city in the mid-90s. He appeared in advertising campaigns for Going Live! and Mr Blobby, television shows like Blue Peter and international films such as Dandi Dust.

In mid-2002, he met Lowkey, the UK rapper responsible for underground classics such as "The Mad World Remix" and the Key to the Game trilogy. With Lowkey's influence, Wordplay began taking a more professional approach to the music industry.

== Career ==
=== Acting ===
Wordplay gained worldwide exposure as an actor in 1998 through the Austrian Obscuro Gothic science fiction film Dandy Dust directed by Hans Scheirl.

Wordplay is a member of the National Youth Theatre (associated actors include Sir Ben Kingsley, Sir Derek Jacobi, and Dame Helen Mirren). He has appeared in productions including The Deptford Tales.

=== Music ===
Wordplay has been a recording artist since 2006. He is recognised for his work with rapper Lowkey.

It was not until 7 March 2009 that Wordplay appeared on an official release in the form of "Alphabet Assassins", the 10th track from the debut Mongrel album Better Than Heavy, released through the label Wall of Sound.

Wordplay has toured with, opened for and appeared on stage with Mongrel and Reverend and the Makers at various festivals and concerts including Glastonbury, T in the Park and Oxegen.

In 2010 Wordplay released his latest project, An Emotional Victory. There was confusion as to whether this was a mixtape or an album, having been dubbed "The Fixtape" and being an entrant into the mixtape awards, then cited as being an album by blogs like Hip Hop Kings. Wordplay called it "a street album" on Twitter, which was supported by other official blogs. The album had an unofficial release on 2 March 2010 when 200 limited copies were sold out directly from Wordplay through his blog.

==== Discography ====
- An Emotional Victory (2010) (with Nutty P overseeing production, alongside collaborations with Pariz 1, Raw Smilez, Cobane, Mr 13 and Kidz (YBM))
- Words of Advice (2007)

Collaborations:

- Alphabet Assassins (2008) (with Mongrel alongside Wretch, Stylah, Tony D, Skinnyman, Purple, No.Lay, III Mill, Mic Righteous, Logic, Kyza, Skirmish, Smife, Franrtic Frank, Doc Brown and Deadly Hunta)

== See also ==
- English hip hop
