= Trollstation =

YouTube channel

- Genre: Reality; Comedy; Pranks
- Created by: Trollstation
- Country of origin: United Kingdom
- Original language: English

Production
- Executive producer: Endrit Ferizoli

Original release
- Network: YouTube
- Release: 2013 – present

Trollstation (previously named TrollStationUK) is a YouTube channel consisting of, as well as collaborating with, numerous British pranksters who perform pranks and social experiments, more recently focusing on the latter. The pranks carried out by members of Trollstation are filmed covertly, often without the permission of those involved; however, they are revealed to be pranks soon after. Some of the group's stunts have led to criminal convictions.

The channel suddenly attracted particularly high publicity after a coordinated series of pitch invasions during a UEFA Europa League game between Tottenham Hotspur and Partizan Belgrade on 27 November 2014.

In March 2016, Trollstation cameraman 'Digi Dan' was jailed for nine months after being convicted of staging a bomb hoax and mock robberies in London.

In May 2016, four other members of Trollstation were jailed for between 16 and 20 weeks after staging a 'terrifying' fake art heist which caused a stampede at the National Portrait Gallery. Five members of "Trollstation" - some with tights on their heads - burst into the central London art gallery playing a loud alarm and pretended to steal paintings. The gallery's visitors fled in apparent panic and one woman passed out, while others were trampled on in the rush before the group moved on to nearby Tate Modern where they carried out a fake robbery and kidnapping, a court was told. In 2019, they also led police on a high speed chase on the River Thames.

As of January 2024, Trollstation has over 1.4 million subscribers on YouTube with 463 million views. On 28 August 2018, they took a break from uploading videos but returned on 17 November 2019.

== Notable pranks ==
Pranks include a rap battle between two police officers, a child dropping a wallet in front of strangers to see if it is returned, and a blind man dropping his wallet. An extremely long selfie stick was another. Other pranks included 'abusing a transvestite', impersonating traffic wardens and giving tickets to police officers, invading the ring at a WWE SmackDown match, a woman approaching men in public asking for sex and pointing a toy gun at police officers. The video involving Daniel Jarvis handing out parking fines to police, confusing the officers involved, featured on Channel 4's Rude Tube.

A temporary 'nightclub' was set up on a London Underground train, with a bouncer, music and promoter. Some members of the public appeared confused and laughed at the situation, whereas others looked disgusted. In another covertly filmed prank, Trollstation created a strip club on the tube.

Trollstation set out to observe how people reacted to seeing breastfeeding on a tube train. This was carried out by the 'victim' Amina Maz and the 'verbal abuser' James Slattery. Maz feigned to breastfeed an obscured baby, and Slattery acted as if he was extremely uncomfortable with these actions. Passengers opposite them on the carriage initially said nothing, smiling at the drama of the situation. There were sniggers from passengers when Slattery demanded that Maz move to a different carriage, with one man intervening, telling him he was "acting aggressively". When Slattery drew the others into the conversation about breastfeeding on the tube, about six people unanimously agreed that Maz had the right to breastfeed in public, and should not be harassed or victimised for doing so. The video became popular on multiple social media sites, including YouTube and Facebook. Most expressed disgust towards James Slattery, especially from non-regular viewers unaware that he was acting in a social experiment. In 2019, the group also led police on a high speed chase on the River Thames. They got away and avoided a fine and arrest.

In 2015, Jarvis dressed up as a London Palace guard and appeared to assault random tourists ( who were actually members of the group ).

On 27 August 2016, Trollstation uploaded a video titled 'UK Burkini Ban Social Experiment'. The video involved 2 of the Trollstation members, Amina Maz (pretending to be a Muslim woman, dressed in a burkini) and Endrit Ferizoli aka Light (pretending to be a Police Officer) on Southend on sea beach. The video gained national attention due to the ongoing debate in France over the banning of the 'burkini' on French beaches. The video was covered online by prominent English newspapers such as the Daily Mirror and The Daily Telegraph They were also featured on BBC News and Light and Maz were interviewed by Kay Burley on Sky News.

== Non-UK pranks ==
The team dropped a wallet 45 times during a visit to Dubai, and it was returned every time. Another prank involved acting drunk in public places, while carrying a bottle of beer.

== Pitch invasion controversy ==
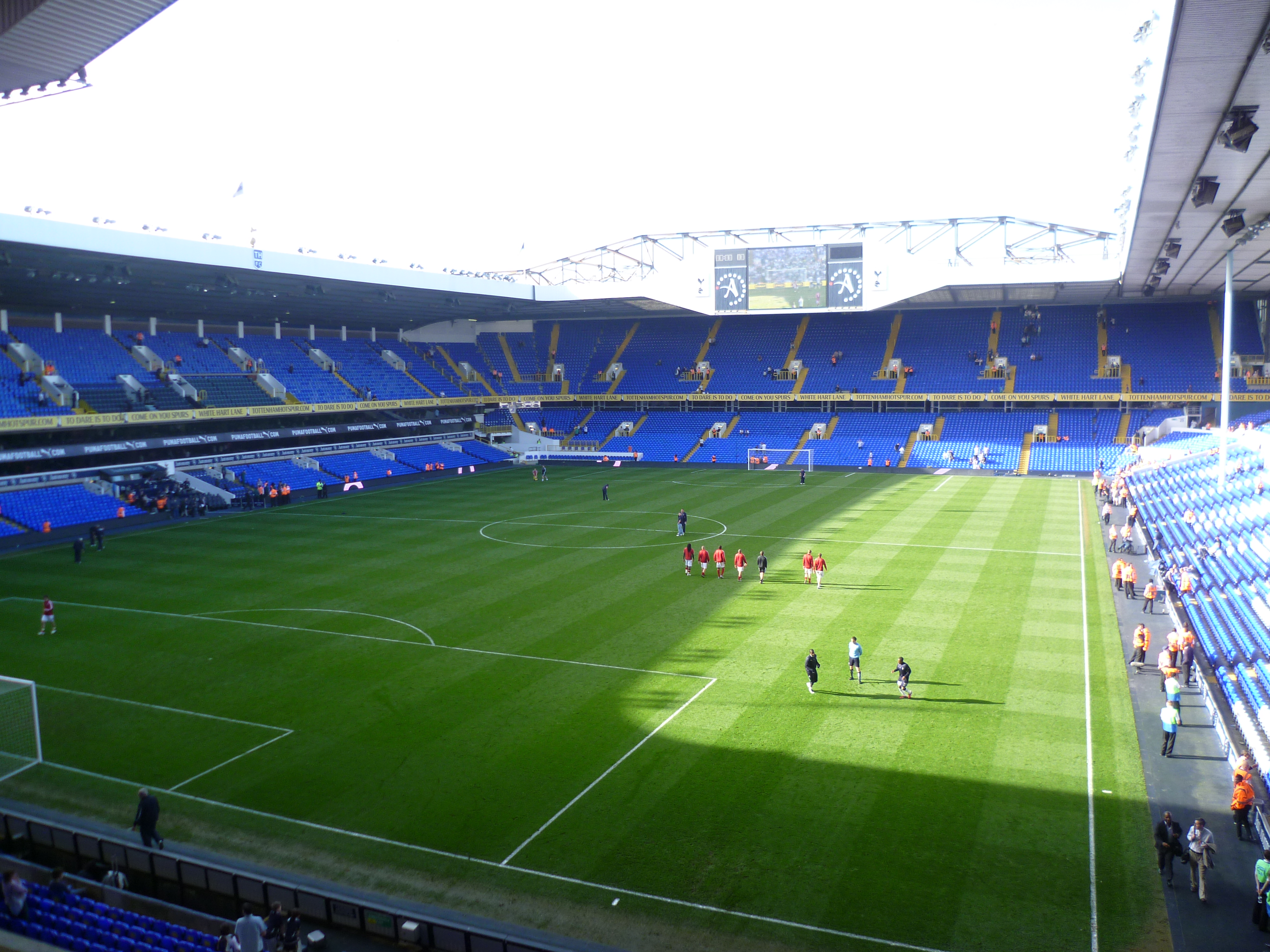
The White Hart Lane stadium pitch that was invaded during a match.

On 27 November 2014, during a UEFA Europa League match between Tottenham Hotspur and Partizan Belgrade, three men encroached the pitch consecutively as part of a publicity stunt, later uploaded to YouTube and named 'Pitch Invasion Prank'. The first man, Nathan Thompson, remained on the field for five minutes, even taking a photograph with Tottenham player Kyle Naughton. Thompson remained on the pitch unchallenged for approximately five minutes before stewards restrained him.

Play was resumed by the referee before a second man entered the field of play: Gomes Garcia. Garcia 'lasted' a considerably less amount of time, being captured by stewards more quickly, with Tottenham striker Roberto Soldado actually pulling off the prankster's shirt.

On 1 December 2014, Thompson, Garcia and Jarvis were charged with pitch invasion. The court heard that the trio were handing out 'Bass Buds' products outside the stadium as part of a promotional stunt when they allegedly made a "spur-of-the-moment" decision to encroach the pitch. Tottenham Hotspur themselves were fined just under £12,000 for the incident and all three men were obligated to pay £155 each, as well as facing a ban on attending football games until 2018.

== Art Gallery Heist and subsequent arrests ==
On 5 July 2015, Gomes Garcia, Daniel Jarvis and Ebenezer Mensah staged a prank which involved pretending to steal paintings from the National Portrait Gallery and Tate Gallery. They were adjudged to have caused panic and distress among the visiting public, and the court compared the prank to a 'terrorist incident'.

The incident has led all three men, as well as Dan Vahn Lee (DigiDan) and Endrit Ferizolli to serve jail terms ranging from 12 to 20 weeks. Jarvis, Ferizolli and Mensah were released in July 2016, Garcia was initially threatened with deportation to his native Portugal but was allowed to remain in the UK after an appeal to the Home Office.
