= Stylah =

British rapper

- Born: Woolwich, London, England
- Origin: Greenwich, London, England
- Genres: British hip hop
- Years active: 2003–present

Kareem Rhouila, better known as Stylah, is a South London rapper from Greenwich, London. He describes himself as a black Arab, half Omani and half Moroccan. After being interested in music for some time, he decided to pursue it seriously. His first mixtape, 2004's The Prince of Thieves, single-handedly sold 9000 copies on the streets of London and other cities spring one single called "Warfare Part II" featuring Serious.

== Biography ==
The Prince of Thieves contributed to Stylah's rise to prominence. He was soon recruited into the Poisonous Poets, a London-based underground hip-hop group consisting of Lowkey, Tony D, Therapist, Doc Brown, Reveal, DJ Snips, and Stylah. He is also a member of the international Catch 22 network started by Kool G Rap, which includes Immortal Technique, Ruff Ryders producer Elite, Scram Jones, Lowkey, DJ Snips, and many more.

Stylah released the mixtape Crash Course with DJ Snips in 2006 and took the same approach as his first CD by selling it straight to the streets with his Street Team, including distributor D Raw. The CD was also on sale in HMV and Virgin Megastores. With this mixtape, Stylah toured England many times, doing shows and promoting his CD. It has had many reviews that have outlined Stylah's ability to better the original songs that he features on. Quotes can be seen on Stylah's Myspace.

In 2009 due to label delays with his album, Stylah decided he needed to release another mix CD to keep the audience's attention and released The Warning hosted by celebrity gangster Dave Courtney – the CD was available for free download.

Stylah was scheduled to release his debut album Treading Water in 2010. He has also featured on many UK songs to create a bigger buzz before the release. He had many offers by record labels for his album, but so far has not signed any deal. Two songs from Treading Water were leaked before release. UK producer Chemo confirmed songs on the album; Poisonous Poets DJ Snips produced a song called "Free", and S-Type is said to have produced three tracks on the album. Another song, titled "Them Boys" produced by Australia's Styalz Fuego and featuring New York City rapper Grafh, was confirmed for Treading Water.
