= Jack Pack (album) =

Act Two

Studio album by Jack Pack
- Released: 30 October 2015
- Genre: Swing
- Label: Syco, Sony
- Producer: Future Cut

Singles from Jack Pack
- 1. "Say You Love Me" Released: 4 September 2015

Jack Pack is the eponymous debut studio album by English vocal group Jack Pack. It was released on 30 September 2015 by Syco Music. The album contains cover songs and three original tracks, including the lead single "Say You Love Me". Jack Pack finished in fourth place on the eighth series of Britain's Got Talent. On 8 September 2015, it was announced that the group had signed with Syco Music.

== Track listing ==
No.	Title	Writer(s)	Length
1.	"Light My Fire"	The Doors	3:19
2.	"Forever"	Randy Newman	3:44
3.	"I Put a Spell on You"	Jalacy Hawkins	4:05
4.	"Stay With Me Baby"	Jerry Ragovoy, George David Weiss	3:05
5.	"Story of My Life"	Julian Bunetta, Jamie Scott, John Ryan, Louis Tomlinson, Liam Payne, Niall Horan, Harry Styles, Zayn Malik	3:43
6.	"Mack the Knife"	Kurt Weill, Bertolt Brecht	4:21
7.	"Stay for a Minute"	Guy Chambers, Erin Boheme	3:20
8.	"Lazy River"	Hoagy Carmichael, Sidney Arodin	4:35
9.	"Say You Love Me"	Darren Lewis, John Reid, Ed Drewett, Iyiola Babalola, Kiris Houston	3:31
10.	"My Way"	Paul Anka, Jacques Revaux, Claude François, Gilles Thibaut	3:36

== Charts ==
Chart (2015)	Peak position
Finnish Albums (Suomen virallinen lista)	31
Scottish Albums (OCC)	9
UK Albums (OCC)	8
