= B. Inspired =

Studio album by Bugzy Malone
- Released: 17 August 2018
- Recorded: 2018
- Genres: Grime; hip-hop
- Length: 53:49
- Label: B. Somebody
- Producers: Z.Dot, DXO, Rymez

Bugzy Malone chronology
King of the North (2017)	B. Inspired (2018)	The Resurrection (2021)

Singles from B. Inspired
- 1. "Warning" Released: 7 June 2018; 2. "Drama" Released: 7 July 2018; 3. "Run" Released: 7 August 2018; 4. "Done His Dance" Released: 15 August 2018

B. Inspired is the debut studio album by English grime rapper Bugzy Malone. It was released on 17 August 2018 by Malone's independent label B. Somebody. It is categorised as a hip hop and grime album. The album consists of an intro, 12 tracks and an outro, with a total duration of 53:49. "Clash of the Titans" was released as a promotional single on 18 May 2018.

The album features guest appearances from JP Cooper, Maverick Sabre, Not3s, Laura White and a collaboration with Rag'n'Bone Man titled "Run". The album will be supported by a 24-concert tour set across the UK and Ireland from August to November 2018. The album was called the "biggest thing to ever come out of grime" along with Stormzy's Gang Signs & Prayer and Skepta's Konnichiwa.

The album was produced by Z.Dot, Diztortion Rymez and Bugzy Malone himself. The music video for "Drama" was provided with background music from Tinie Tempah and Krept & Konan. It was inspired by Quentin Tarantino and Christopher Nolan, and was directed and edited by frequent collaborator Connor Hamilton. The music video for "Warning" was directed and edited by Connor Hamilton, Luke C. Harper, Matt George Lovett and Joshua Aarnos. It was produced by Z.Dot Productions.

== Track listing ==
B. Inspired track listing
No.	Title	Writer(s)	Length
1.	"B. Inspired"	Aaron Davies	2:48
2.	"Warning"	Davies	3:42
3.	"Ordinary People" (featuring JP Cooper)	Davies; John Cooper	4:30
4.	"Die by the Gun"	Davies	4:08
5.	"Drama"	Davies	4:20
6.	"Run" (featuring Rag'n'Bone Man)	Davies; Rory Graham	3:58
7.	"Done His Dance"	Davies	3:16
8.	"Separation" (featuring Maverick Sabre)	Davies; Michael Stafford	4:10
9.	"Heart" (featuring Not3s)	Davies; Lukman Odunaike	3:35
10.	"Come Through"	Davies	4:25
11.	"Death Do Us Part"	Davies	4:25
12.	"Submarine"	Davies	3:28
13.	"Street Life" (featuring Laura White)	Davies; Laura White	3:24
14.	"The End"	Davies	3:40
Total length:			53:49

== Charts ==
Chart performance for B. Inspired
Chart (2018)	Peak position
Irish Albums (IRMA)	19
Scottish Albums (Official Charts)	11
UK Albums (Official Charts)	6

== Certifications ==
Certifications for B. Inspired
Region	Certification	Certified units/sales
United Kingdom (BPI)	Gold	100,000^{‡}
^{‡} Sales+streaming figures based on certification alone.
