= Mongrel (band) =

British rock band

- Origin: Sheffield / London, England
- Genres: Hip hop; indie rock
- Years active: 2008–2009
- Past members: Matt Helders; Jon McClure; Andy Nicholson; Lowkey; Drew McConnell; Joe Moskow

Mongrel were a British supergroup formed in 2008, founded by former Arctic Monkeys bassist Andy Nicholson. Alongside Nicholson in the band were Jon McClure and Joe Moskow, both of Reverend and The Makers, Babyshambles bassist Drew McConnell as well as London rapper Lowkey from the Poisonous Poets and former Arctic Monkeys bandmate, drummer Matt Helders.

Mongrel released their first album Better Than Heavy on 7 March 2009. In 2011, McClure was asked if there were plans to release anymore music. He said Mongrel was a side project and a one off.

== Better Than Heavy ==
Better Than Heavy was released on Saturday 7 March 2009 free in The Independent newspaper. For the album, McClure stated "We had Saul Williams come in and do a thing on it [. . .] We're really taking a few people to task, kind of like we're Public Enemy or something." It was the first time a British band had given their debut album away free with a national newspaper on release. The full release, 23 March 2009, contains two CDs, Disc 2 is a reworked version of "Better Than Heavy" by Adrian Sherwood at On-U Sound Studios, tracks are re-titled Dub versions.

== Discography ==
Albums

- Better Than Heavy (2009)
