= Bugzy Malone =

British rapper and actor (born 1990)

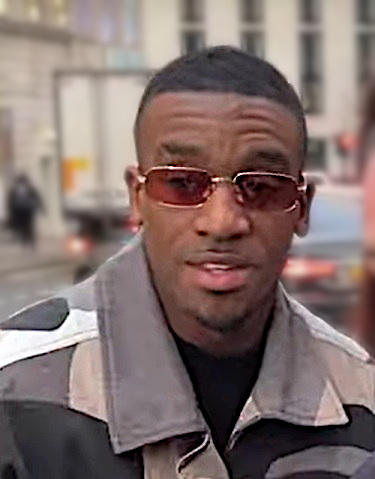
- Malone in 2024

Background information
- Also known as: Bugzy Malone; Bugz
- Born: Aaron Daniel Davies; 20 December 1990 (age 35); Manchester, England
- Genres: British hip-hop; grime
- Occupations: Rapper; songwriter; actor
- Instrument: Vocals
- Years active: 2010–present
- Label: Ill Gotten
- Website: thebugzymaloneshow.co.uk

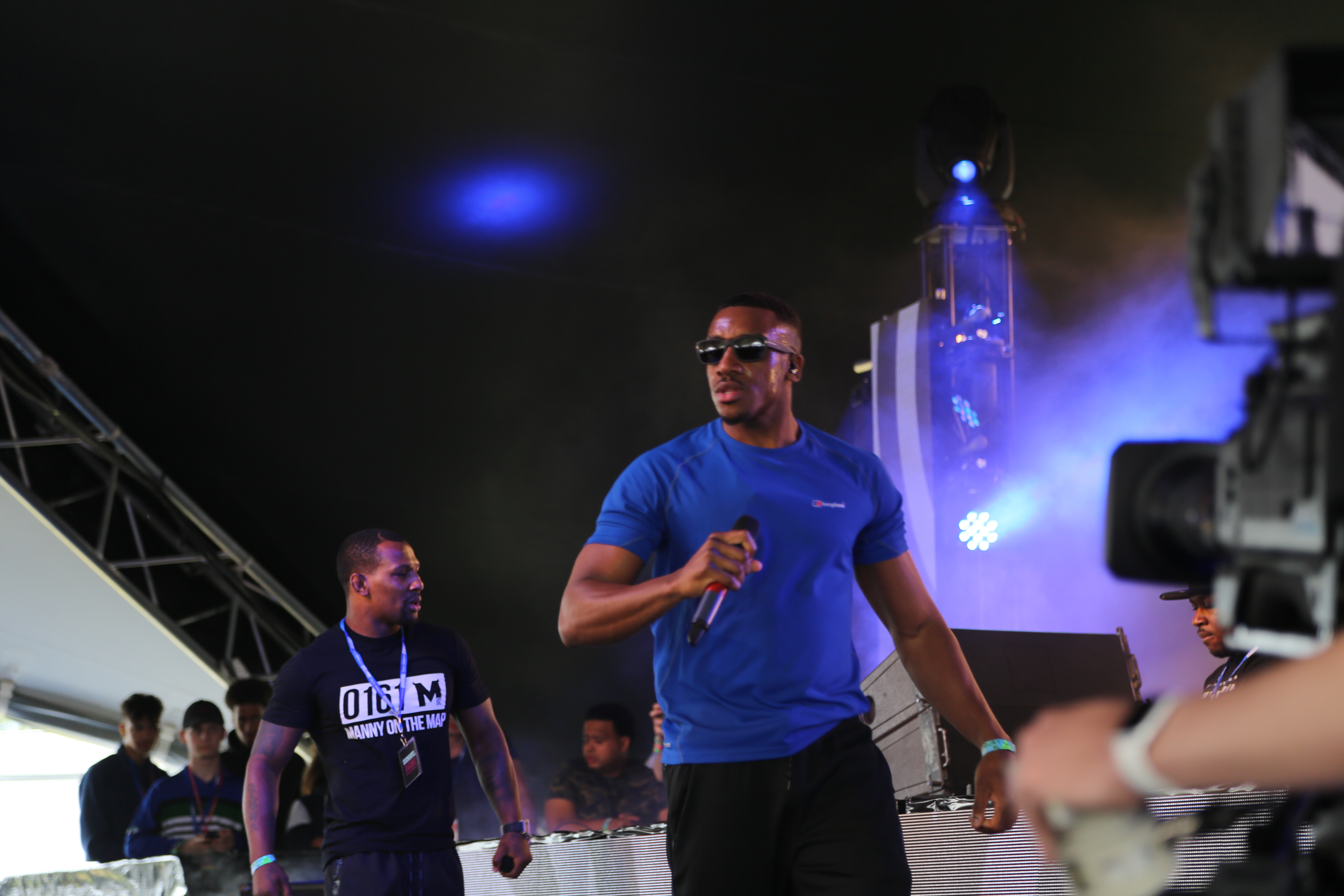
Malone (right) at the Glastonbury Festival, 2016

Aaron Daniel Davies (born 20 December 1990), known professionally as Bugzy Malone, is a British rapper and actor from Manchester, England. Malone has been described as one of the key artists instigating a "grime revival" moving the UK urban scene away from more commercially oriented music, and the first artist in the grime genre from Manchester to commercially succeed in the UK.

Malone's third extended play King of the North was released on 14 July 2017 and peaked at No. 4 on the UK Albums Chart.

== Early life ==
Malone was born Aaron Davies in Withington Community Hospital and grew up in Crumpsall, Manchester, in a family of career criminals. He grew up in a poverty-stricken household and had never met his biological father in his childhood. Davies saw his stepfather as a role model until his parents divorced due to domestic abuse. He grew up being influenced by his family members who were involved in criminal activities, including his uncle whose murder he witnessed. Davies began taking part in criminal activities when he was eleven years old, and as a result was expelled from secondary school in year nine when he was fourteen. He continued a life of criminal behaviour until he was arrested when he was sixteen years old and sent to HMP Stoke Heath; he was unable to complete his GCSE exams. After leaving prison when he was 17 years old, Davies took up boxing as a hobby in an attempt to find a career and avoid returning to crime. While he was boxing as a career, Davies moved close to his biological father in Marple, Greater Manchester, before they eventually lost contact. He moved close to Heaton Park when he was 20 years old.

Davies was inspired to start rapping from the influential "Risky Roadz" DVD series that featured artists such as Dizzee Rascal, Wiley and Skepta early in their careers. He began rapping with his friends when they would often congregate or commit crimes. His friends would play instrumentals from their mobile phones which Davies would then freestyle on. Davies received the nickname "Bugz" from a gang he was in when he was 13 years old, before developing into "Bugzy Malone" when he was serving his prison sentence. After leaving prison, Davies began to take music seriously as a side hobby to his then-growing boxing career.

== Career ==
=== 2010–2015: Career beginnings ===
Malone released his debut mixtape, SwaggaMan, in 2010. He began freestyling for northern grime YouTube channel KODH TV on their series Spray Out Freestyle. He then freestyled on popular urban YouTube channels including Grime Daily. In 2011, Davies released his second mixtape Why So Serious, inspired by Batman: The Dark Knight Rises. The lead single from the mixtape "Hip Hop Heavy Metal" was released on 21 September 2011 and the music video has 2.4 million views on YouTube as of late 2025. Lost in Meanwhile City, Malone's third mixtape, was released in 2012. Malone commented on the mixtape on his website:

I called this mixtape "Lost In Meanwhile City" because I stumbled across a film called Franklyn — I felt like I could relate to the dark atmosphere at the time and also some of the featured characters faced similar problems I felt I was faced with i.e family problems, girl problems, law suits, depression. I felt 'Lost In Meanwhile City' was the perfect metaphor for my position in life at that particular time, I felt lost and basically in a world of my own.

The lead single for the project and the second music video created by Malone was released on 23 August 2012. In 2014, Malone announced his fourth mixtape, Journal of an Evil Genius, and begun a "mixtape campaign" where he released music videos with narratives that coincided with the singles released from the mixtape, similar to a "visual album". The visuals were released in the form of a YouTube video every Monday at 19:00 for six weeks. On the topic of creating a campaign consisting of videos to promote the mixtape, Malone listed Quentin Tarantino as an influence and said: "I felt as if I wanted to tell a story loosely based on reality and used the raw emotion of the songs as an excuse to create a mini-horror movie." As of 2017, the videos have over 5 million views combined on YouTube. The mixtape was released on 10 February 2014. Talking about the mixtape, Davies wrote on his website.

I called this mixtape 'The Journal of an Evil Genius' mainly because that is what it is. The songs themselves are written in a journal-like style making this record the one that means the most to me. The "Evil Genius" is an alias I came up with one day in the studio and it just kind of stuck. This project is an Intricate/accurate story about my past all the way back to childhood going right the way up to the present giving it a journal-like feel.

=== 2015–present: Feud with Chip, Walk with Me, Facing Time and King of the North ===
On 7 September 2014, Malone released a "Spitfire" freestyle on JDZmedia which procured his first million views on YouTube and gave him more popularity outside Manchester; it later earned him a performance on Fire in the Booth with Charlie Sloth on BBC Radio 1Xtra. Davies released his latest Fire in The Booth video on 14 March 2015. When Malone originally received a phone call from Sloth requesting an appearance on Radio 1Xtra's Fire in the Booth segment, he thought it was a prank call. Malone's Fire in the Booth is currently the most viewed video in the series with 25 million views. In May 2016, 1Xtra released Davies' second Fire in the Booth which currently has 9 million views. During his Fire in The Booth, Davies dissed fellow grime artist Chip. Chip, two days later, published a tweet on Twitter saying "The name you can ride off... CHIPMUNK!" before replying to his critics including Davies lyrically on the song "Pepper Riddim" which was released on 20 March 2015. A grime feud and drew attention to the grime scene. Several days later on 25 March, Davies released "Relegation Riddim". The music video on YouTube featured many artists who were included in the feud, including Big Narstie. The video currently has over 12 million views, making it Davies' most viewed music video. On 3 April 2017 Chip released "The End" which Davies replied to with "The Revival." In September 2017, Chip replied to "The Revival" with six tracks which led to Davies replying twice. This would be the last time Davies replied to Chip who later went on to include two more diss tracks before stopping. In July 2017, Davies released a documentary-style vlog in promotion for his EP King of the North where he directly references the feud, saying:

He phoned me saying "Yo listen, we can do this thing like a, back and forth ting and shine some light on your career" but you know yourself, I've been grinding at this point for six years. I don't need anybody to shine. Right, so, it was a case of "alright, cool" and it was quite a civilized conversation. He was like "we can do festivals together" and this that and the other and I was like "yeah, I hear that bro, but I kind of already wrote my response."

On 13 June 2015, DJ MistaJam premiered Malone's first official single "Watch Your Mouth" on BBC Radio 1 and the video was released on Malone's YouTube channel the same night. The track went on to be played across UK radio and popular TV networks, including Capital Xtra, Bang Radio, Kiss 100, Reprezent, Unity Radio, BBC Xtra, Radio 1, Asian Network, Westside FM, MTV Base, Flava TV, Kiss TV and Channel AKA. On 24 July 2015, Malone released his first EP Walk with Me, which entered at number 8 on the UK Albums Chart. He later set up his own record label, "Ill Gotten Records", in an attempt to assist Manchester-based artists.

Malone released Facing Time, his second EP, which made No. 6 on the UK Albums Chart on 16 June 2016. To promote the EP, he released a trilogy of visuals titled "Section 8(1)" meant to coincide with the subject matter of the EP. On 27 August, released the first "chapter" with the same name as his hit song, "Beauty and the Beast". On 28 August 2016, chapter 2 was released and was based on the song "Facing Time". On 29 August 2016, the third and final chapter, based on the song "I Suggest", was released. "Section 8(1)" was produced by G. Kuba and Malone himself. Malone planned a publicity stunt about himself being arrested in an armed robbery to promote the EP.

Malone released his first charting single "Through the Night" with DJ Luck & MC Neat on 18 May 2017. The song charted at No. 92, making it Davies' first charting single on the UK singles chart. Davies released his third EP King of the North on 14 July 2017. The album charted at No. 4 on the UK Album Charts and had three charting singles, "Through the Night", "Memory Lane" and "Bruce Wayne", charting at 92, 74 and 99 respectively. Davies was announced as one of the artists performing at the Manchester Evening News Arena reopening and posted on his personal Twitter account following his performance: "I've told them before and I'll tell them again Manchester is the home of the brave..."

A photo of Davies and Chip pictured together at Giggs' birthday party was uploaded to Instagram on 13 December 2017. This led to speculation that their two year long feud was either over or had been faked. Davies explained that he reconciled with Chip and ended their feud at the party.

== Artistry ==
=== Musical style ===
Malone lists his biggest inspiration as Tupac Shakur. The Guardian has called Malone a trendsetter for Manchester's urban music scene, mainly its grime scene where he was the first Manchester grime artist to reach national commercial success. When asked to describe his sound by MTV, he called his sound an "Evolution of Grime." Malone's Mancunian accent is a trademark of his vocal style which has been described as "deep-from-the-diaphragm".

Malone has been praised for his writing style which has been called "introspective", "confessional", and "unique". Davies' lyrics usually deal with criminality, poverty and emotional suffering. Malone's delivery has been called "clear, powerful and precise", and "fast-rapid" when he is rapping.

=== Fashion ===
In May 2016, Malone partnered with Supply & Demand for a fashion line that would mainly encompass track suits. The line was sold at retail chain JD Sports and has dropped three sets of the Supply & Demand collaboration. Malone's clothing is mainly merchandise that had been formatted into high-end fashion wear. The clothing generally has traits of things that Davies likes, such as the superhero, Batman.

== Legal issues ==
When Davies was sixteen, he was arrested and sent to HMP Stoke Heath. Bugzy Malone told Vice.com "There's nothing good about jail. Having your freedom taken off you… It's nothing to be proud of. But then, you can't pay for that feeling of getting your freedom back".

On 15 September 2020, Bugzy appeared in court after being charged with two counts of wounding to inflict grievous bodily harm. He was cleared of the charges after the jury accepted he was acting in self-defense.

== Personal life ==
In December 2020, Manchester-born Bugzy Malone and his team have bought 50 underprivileged children a sack full of presents each.

Davies proposed to his then-girlfriend of 9 years on 20 December 2019.

On 26 March 2020, Davies was seriously injured after being involved in a crash in Bury. Footage circulated on Twitter of the rapper riding a quad bike and was followed by videos of him lying on the ground in the aftermath of the collision. He was revealed to have crashed into a car at 70 mph whilst not wearing a helmet, which led to him subsequently suffering a brain bleed.

Davies is a supporter of football club Manchester City.

== Discography ==
=== Studio albums ===
Title	Album details	Peak chart positions					Certifications
Title	Album details	UK	UK HH/R&B	UK Ind.	IRL	SCO	Certifications
B. Inspired	Released: 17 August 2018; Format: CD, digital download	6	—	2	19	11	BPI: Gold
The Resurrection	Released: 28 May 2021; Format: CD, digital download	7	1	—	36	13	
The Great British Dream	Released: 10 May 2024; Format: CD, digital download	13	2	3	—	29	

=== Extended plays ===
List of extended plays, with selected chart positions
Title	Extended play details	Peak chart positions				Certifications
Title	Extended play details	UK	UK R&B	UK Ind.	SCO	Certifications
Walk with Me	Released: 24 July 2015; Format: CD, digital download	8	2	2	65	
Facing Time	Released: 3 June 2016; Format: CD, digital download	6	2	1	33	BPI: Gold
King of the North	Released: 14 July 2017; Format: CD, digital download	4	1	1	22	BPI: Gold
"—" denotes a recording that did not chart or was not released in that territory.

=== Mixtapes ===
List of non-commercial mixtapes
Title	Album details
SwaggaMan	Released: 2010; Format: Digital download
Why So Serious	Released: 1 September 2011; Re-released: 13 December 2024; Format: Digital download
Lost in MeanWhile City	Released: 10 May 2012; Re-released: 13 December 2024; Format: Digital download
The Journal of an Evil Genius	Released: 2014; Re-released: 13 December 2024; Format: Digital download
Stereotyped	Released: January 2015; Re-released: 13 December 2024; Format: Digital download

=== Singles ===
==== As lead artist ====
Title	Year	Peak chart positions				Certifications	Album
Title	Year	UK	UK HH/R&B	UK Ind.	IRE	Certifications	Album
"Relegation Riddim"	2015	—	—	—	—		Non-album singles
"Zombie Riddim"	2015	—	—	—	—		Non-album singles
"WasteMan"	2015	—	—	35	—		Non-album singles
"Bronson"	2016	—	—	—	—		Non-album singles
"Beauty and the Beast"	2016	—	—	32	—	BPI: Platinum	Facing Time
"Mad"	2016	—	—	42	—		Non-album single
"Aggy Wid It"	2017	—	—	31	—		King of the North
"Through the Night" (with DJ Luck & MC Neat)	2017	92	27	6	—	BPI: Silver	King of the North
"Bruce Wayne"	2017	99	31	8	—	BPI: Silver	King of the North
"And What"	2018	—	—	—	—		Non-album singles
"Clash of the Titans"	2018	—	—	29	—		Non-album singles
"Warning"	2018	97	—	19	—		B. Inspired
"Drama"	2018	—	—	20	—		B. Inspired
"Run" (featuring Rag'n'Bone Man)	2018	55	31	6	84	BPI: Silver	B. Inspired
"Done His Dance"	2018	—	—	30	—		B. Inspired
"M.E.N II"	2019	34	14	4	64	BPI: Silver	Non-album singles
"Kilos" (featuring Aitch)	2019	20	9	1	61	BPI: Silver	Non-album singles
"The North's Face"	2019	—	—	—	—		Non-album singles
"December"	2019	66	33	—	—		Non-album singles
"Cause a Commotion" (featuring Skip Marley)	2020	93	—	—	—		Non-album singles
"Boxes of Bush"	2020	—	—	—	—		The Gentlemen (Original Motion Picture Soundtrack)
"Daily Duppy"	2020	55	20	—	81	BPI: Silver	Non-album single
"M.E.N III"	2020	18	12	—	35	BPI: Silver	The Resurrection
"Doe'd Up"	2020	—	—	—	—		Non-album single
"Don't Cry" (with Dermot Kennedy)	2020	77	33	—	25		The Resurrection
"Cold Nights in the 61"	2020	—	—	—	—		The Resurrection
"Notorious" (with Chip)	2021	30	10	—	70		The Resurrection
"Welcome to the Hood" (featuring Emeli Sandé)	2021	88	—	—	—		The Resurrection
"Salvador"	2021	89	—	—	—		The Resurrection
"Skeletons"	2021	80	—	—	—		The Resurrection
"Ride Out"	2021	68	36	—	—		The Resurrection
"War Mode"	2021	55	18	—	—		Non-album single
"BMW (Remix)" (with Bad Boy Chiller Crew, Mist and French the Kid)	2022	—	—	—	—		Influential
"Energy" (with Mist)	2022	38	—	4	—	BPI: Silver	Non-album single
"Out of Nowhere" (with TeeDee)	2022	9	4	1	14	BPI: Platinum	The Great British Dream
"All of Me (Do for Love)" (with Blinkie and Star.One)	2023	—	—	—	—		Non-album singles
"Easy" (with KSI and R3hab)	2023	—	—	—	—		Non-album singles
"One Direction" (with Arrdee)	2023	58	30	—	—		Non-album singles
"Mrs Lonely"	2023	99	—	41	—		Non-album singles
"Lean"	2023	—	—	—	—		Non-album singles
"JDZ Spitfire II"	2023	—	—	—	—		Non-album singles
"Ghetto Wisdom"	2024	—	—	—	—		The Great British Dream
"Ladies"	2024	—	—	—	—		The Great British Dream
"Daily Duppy" (featuring GRM Daily)	2024	—	—	—	—		The Great British Dream
"Old Friends"	2024	—	—	—	—		The Great British Dream
"Beauty & the Beast II"	2024	—	—	47	—		The Great British Dream
"The Riddler"	2024	—	—	—	—		TBA
"The Robbery" (with TeeDee)	2024	—	—	—	—		TBA
"Ballad Of A Lone Soldier"	2024	—	—	—	—		TBA
"—" denotes a recording that did not chart or was not released in that territory.

==== As featured artist ====
List of featured singles, with selected chart positions and album name
Title	Year	Peak chart positions		Album
Title	Year	UK	UK HH/R&B	Album
"Who Am I?" (Kojo Funds featuring Bugzy Malone)	2018	69	—	Golden Boy
"I Spy (Remix)" (Krept & Konan featuring Bugzy Malone, Morrisson, SL, RV, Snap Capone and Abra Cadabra)	2019	—	—	Non-album single
"Body (Remix)" (Tion Wayne & Russ Millions featuring ArrDee, E1 (3x3), Bugzy Malone, Fivio Foreign, ZT (3x3), Darkoo and Buni)	2021	1	—	Green With Envy and Pier Pressure
"Payslips" (Swarmz featuring Bugzy Malone and M24)	2021	76	26	Non-album single
"—" denotes a recording that did not chart or was not released in that territory.

=== Other charted and certified songs ===
List of other charted and/or certified songs, with selected chart positions and certifications
Title	Year	Peak chart positions			Certifications	Album
Title	Year	UK	UK HH/R&B	UK Ind.	Certifications	Album
"M.E.N"	2015	—	—	24	BPI: Platinum	Walk with Me
"Moving"	2016	—	—	23	BPI: Silver	Facing Time
"Facing Time"	2016	—	—	24		Facing Time
"Gone Clear"	2016	—	—	33		Facing Time
"Late Night in the 0161"	2016	—	—	41		Facing Time
"We Don't Care"	2016	—	—	42		Facing Time
"King of the North"	2017	—	—	15		King of the North
"Memory Lane" (featuring Tom Grennan)	2017	65	18	5	BPI: Gold	King of the North
"We Don't Play"	2017	—	—	43	BPI: Silver	King of the North
"Sniper"	2017	—	—	45		King of the North
"B. Inspired"	2018	—	—	43		B. Inspired
"Ordinary People" (featuring JP Cooper)	2018	—	—	—	BPI: Silver	B. Inspired
"Die by the Gun"	2018	—	—	27	BPI: Silver	B. Inspired
"Come Through"	2018	—	—	46		B. Inspired
"Death Do Us Part"	2018	—	—	45		B. Inspired
"Grown Flex" (with Chip)	2021	63	—	10		Snakes & Ladders
"Silly" (KSI featuring Bugzy Malone)	2021	—	—	18		All Over the Place
"—" denotes a recording that did not chart or was not released in that territory.

=== Guest appearances ===
List of non-single guest appearances, showing year released, other artist(s), album name, and credit(s)
Title	Year	Other artist(s)	Album	Credit(s)
"So Close"	2017	Tinie Tempah, Guy Sebastian	Youth	Featured artist; co-writer
"Don't Stop"	2017	Chase & Status	Tribe	Featured artist; co-writer
"Ghost" (Remix)	2018	Dizzee Rascal	Non-album remix	Featured artist; co-writer
"Grown Flex"	2021	Chip	Snakes & Ladders	Featured artist; co-writer
"Silly"	2021	KSI	All Over the Place	Featured artist; co-writer

== Filmography ==
=== Film ===
Year	Title	Role
2019	The Gentlemen	Ernie
2023	Operation Fortune: Ruse de Guerre	J.J. Davies
