= Charlie Sloth =

British DJ, producer and TV presenter (born 1981)

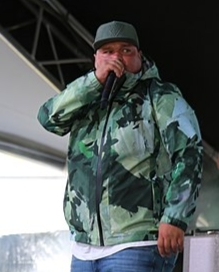
- Rouillon in 2016

Background information
- Born: 20 August 1981 (age 45)
- Origin: Camden, London, England
- Genres: Hip hop; trap; grime; political hip hop
- Occupations: DJ; hype man; record producer; radio host; TV presenter
- Label: Grimey Limey
- Website: charliesloth.com

Charlie Ian Paul Rouillon (born 20 August 1981), known professionally as Charlie Sloth, is an English DJ, hype man, producer and TV presenter.

== Early life ==
Charlie Rouillon was born on 20 August 1981, from Seychelles and Irish heritage. He was raised in the London Borough of Camden and attended Haverstock School. He is an avid supporter of Liverpool F.C.

== Career ==
Most of Sloth's career as a radio DJ has been spent on BBC Radio 1 and BBC Radio 1Xtra, presenting The Rap Show on Saturday nights and his weeknight late show The 8th. He was previously a presenter on the weekday drivetime show on BBC Radio 1Xtra.

His trademark freestyle brand, Fire in the Booth, has been described as "...a real mark of prestige in the scene, especially for newcomers" with MCs from grime and hip-hop coming into the studio to perform. Akala, Avelino, Devlin, Professor Green, K Koke, Lowkey, Mic Righteous, Bugzy Malone, Big Narstie, Tinie Tempah, Wretch 32, Drake, Big Shaq, Migos and others have performed on Fire in the Booth. Canadian rapper Drake's appearance was "...four or five years in the making", with Sloth noting in 2018 that it was one of his favourite moments of the show.

=== 2007 – 2008 ===
Sloth came to notability in 2007, after he won Most Original Video at the CraveFest Awards Canada for music video "Guided Tour of Camden". He also created a weekly online video series Being Charlie Sloth, which was picked up by WorldStarHipHop.com. The show ran for 59 episodes.

In 2008, Sloth won Best Rap/Hip-Hop/R&B Unsigned Artist at the CraveFest awards in Canada. He released Hard Being Good in the same year.

=== 2012 – present ===
Sloth presented the daily drivetime show on BBC Radio 1Xtra from September 2012 until November 2017.

On 6 November 2017, Sloth began presenting a new late-night show, The 8th, which was simulcast on Radio 1 and 1Xtra from Monday to Thursday from 9 until 11 pm.

On 3 October 2018, Sloth announced he would be leaving BBC 1Xtra, with his last planned show being on 3 November. This was however cut short on 20 October when Radio 1 "agreed with Charlie" that he would not be completing his remaining 10 shows. This followed Charlie Sloth controversially "storming the stage" at the Audio and Productions Awards show on 18 October. On 14 January 2019, Sloth announced via Instagram that he would be joining Apple Music and Beats 1 and bringing Fire in the Booth over. He also hosts the Rap Show and curates playlists for Apple Music.

In August 2020, it was announced that Sloth had signed a deal with Jay Z's Roc Nation. The deal is a partnership which sees Roc Nation look after all of his assets on a worldwide deal.

In November 2025, Sloth announced he was leaving Apple Music at the end of the year.

In January 2026, Sloth announced he was working on his own album, with a different direction away from Grime.

== Personal life ==
Charlie Rouillon was born in 1981 in London, England. Both of his parents are originally from Liverpool, as are his siblings, and his mother moved to London while pregnant with him.

Rouillon has spoken in interviews about his black grandfather, who was from the Seychelles, which is where the surname Rouillon originates. He has said that his grandfather later settled in Liverpool after serving for Britain during the Second World War.

Rouillon was educated at Haverstock School in Camden Town, London.

=== Political views ===
In November 2019, along with 34 other musicians, Sloth signed a letter endorsing Labour Party leader Jeremy Corbyn in the 2019 UK general election with a call to end austerity.

== Discography ==
=== Albums ===
- The Plug (2017)

=== Mixtapes ===
- The Big Boot (2004)
- Secret Society (2006)
- Hard Being Good (2008)
- The Black Book (2010)
- Hood Heat Vol. 1 (2014)
- Hood Heat Vol. 2 (2015)
