= Lowkey =

British rapper and activist (born 1986)

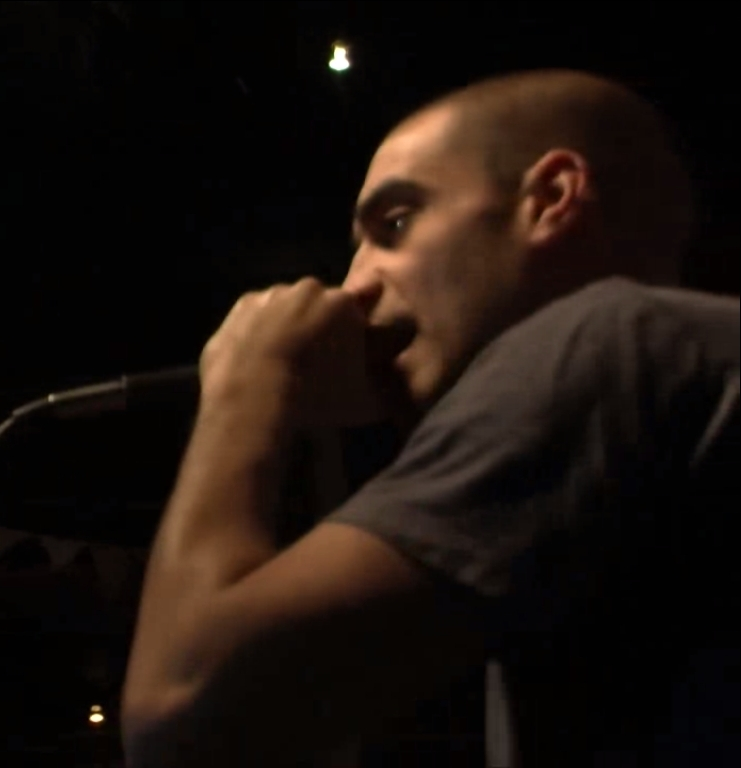
- Lowkey performing in Bristol, 2009

Background information
- Born: Kareem Dennis; 23 May 1986 (age 40); London, England
- Genres: British hip hop; grime
- Years active: 2001–2012; 2016–present
- Labels: Mesopotamia Music; SO Empire Recordings

Kareem Dennis (Arabic: كريم دينيس; born 23 May 1986), better known by his stage name Lowkey, is a British-Iraqi rapper and activist from London. He first became known through a series of mixtapes he released before he was 18, before taking a hiatus from the music business. He would return in 2008, with appearances on BBC Radio and at various festivals and concerts including the BBC Electric Proms, Glastonbury, T In The Park and Oxegen in the buildup to his first solo album Dear Listener, as well as collaborating with other British musicians to form the supergroup Mongrel. He released his second solo album, Soundtrack to the Struggle, independently in 2011.

After a five-year hiatus, Lowkey released a string of singles between 2016 and 2018 to precede the release of his third album, Soundtrack to the Struggle 2, released in 2019.

== Early life ==
Lowkey was born in London to an Iraqi mother and an English father. From the age of twelve he began to rap, initially imitating American rappers but soon began using his own accent. He began attending open mic sessions at the Deal Real record shop on Carnaby Street, Central London. The first time he went he introduced himself as Lowkey and was told there was already a regular there by that name; the two had a rap battle to decide who would continue to use the alias. Kareem emerged victorious and continued to use the name thereafter.

== Music career ==
=== 2003–09: Mixtapes & Dear Listener ===
The first part of his mixtape series Key to the Game, was released independently in 2003. Within a year and a half he had released a second and third volume. Though the first volume largely used music from other artists, the second was mostly original work in conjunction with numerous artists and producers while the third, which had no skits or short songs like a traditional mixtape would, was mostly his own work.

While Lowkey was busying himself with European tours in support of Immortal Technique, Canibus, and Dead Prez, he began to make musical contacts and record his debut album. Though stalled by other artistic endeavours, Dear Listener was released in October 2008. In December he released the compilation album Uncensored, with highlights from the entire Key to the Game series and Dear Listener, digitally through iTunes.

=== 2009–12: Soundtrack to the Struggle ===
After touring with Immortal Technique the two made a single, "Voices of the Voiceless" which was released in September 2009.

The second single, "Long Live Palestine" (also known as "Tears to Laughter") was digitally released on 9 March 2009. In December 2009, Lowkey revealed he would release a second part to "Long Live Palestine" featuring Palestinian rap group DAM, Anglo-Palestinian soloist Shadia Mansour, Narcy from Iraq, Iranian artists Hich Kas and Reveal, Syrian-Lebanese performer Eslam Jawaad and African-American Muslim Hasan Salaam. "Long Live Palestine" was packaged in an EP with Part 1 and the instrumental. The single received statements of support from Tony Benn and Benjamin Zephiniah.

Soundtrack to the Struggle was released on 16 October 2011. The album entered the UK Albums Chart on 23 October at number 57, becoming Lowkey's first entry on the national charts. Soundtrack to the Struggle peaked at number 14 on the UK Download Chart. On the UK R&B Chart, the album received its highest OCC position, number 6. In the UK Indie Chart, the album peaked at number 9.

=== 2012–16: Musical hiatus ===
On 17 April 2012, Lowkey put his musical career on hiatus, announcing the news on Facebook. He said that after months of contemplation, he had decided to "step away from music and concentrate on my studies". With this, he announced that he would deactivate his Facebook page, which had over 180,000 followers.

=== 2016–present: Return and Soundtrack to the Struggle trilogy ===
On 26 July 2016, various sources shared an image on social media relating to Lowkey's return to the music scene with new single "Ahmed". On 29 July 2016, Lowkey released a video for the single, the subject matter of which revolves around the refugee crisis and Europe's response. In addition, a seven-day tour across the UK in September 2016 was announced. On 3 September, his next single "Children of Diaspora" was released. The track addresses issues of racism and xenophobia, and mentions victims of police brutality in the UK and USA.

In August 2018, Lowkey announced via social media that he would be releasing his single "Ahmed", which features Mai Khalil, on platforms such as Spotify and iTunes on 2 September 2018, stating that this would be his first commercial release since 2011. He also confirmed that he was in the process of making a second album, titled Soundtrack to the Struggle 2.

Soundtrack to the Struggle 2 was released on 5 April 2019, with UK tour dates scheduled to start less than a week later.

Soundtrack to the Struggle 3 was released on 28 October 2024.

=== Collaborations ===
Lowkey joined a hip-hop group called Poisonous Poets with which was formed by rapper Reveal and released one self-titled mixtape in 2005. Poisonous Poets (sometimes known as Double P) the group also consisted of Doc Brown whom Lowkey met at Real Deal records, Reveal, Stylah, Tony D and Therapist.

Lowkey's manager passed on the first two parts of Key to the Game to Jon McClure, frontman of Reverend and The Makers who is also an outspoken political activist. Wanting to mix popular music with politics, and mix indie rock with hip-hop, the two formed a supergroup, Mongrel, with Arctic Monkeys drummer Matt Helders and ex-bassist Andy Nicholson, Babyshambles bassist Drew McConnell and a revolving set of other musicians. The album, Better Than Heavy, was released for free with The Independent on 7 March. The band were asked to perform live in Venezuela on the invitation of President Hugo Chavez. Lowkey visited Caracas during the first summit of CELAC, championing Chavez as "a leader who is striving to build an independent alternative to the neo-liberal capitalism which has disenfranchised his people for decades."

== Political activism ==
Lowkey is a vocal opponent of Zionism and is a patron of the Palestine Solidarity Campaign. He characterises Zionism as colonialism and ethnic cleansing.

In February 2009, he travelled to Palestinian refugee camps around the West Bank area to perform fundraising shows to help rebuild the Gaza Strip but was detained by the Israel Police for nine hours at Ben Gurion International Airport and interrogated, while having his passport confiscated. Later in 2009, he travelled with M-1 of Dead Prez to carry out a humanitarian aid mission and bring medical aid to the Palestinian people in the Gaza Strip; this led to a collaboration between the two on Soundtrack to the Struggle. He was again detained for half a day by Israeli airport police in July 2010, en route to a number of concerts and musical workshops in refugee camps in the West Bank.

In January 2011, Marcus Dysch writing for The Jewish Chronicle about the involvement of Lowkey in the Palestine Solidarity Campaign commented: "One expert studying anti-Israel activity described the increasing influence of performers such as Lowkey as a 'potential nightmare,' and compared the impact of his backing for the campaign to the effect of artists such as Annie Lennox and Elvis Costello 'attacking the Jewish state' ".

Lowkey has been a prominent member of the Stop the War Coalition and has spoken against the 2003 invasion of Iraq. He has been a sharp critic of American and British foreign policy, stating that the two countries are only interested in supporting leaders who are under their influence or are willing to assist them. He also said American media overlooks those within the country who do not believe in American military supremacy. In 2012, Lowkey turned down an opportunity to appear on Tim Westwood TV in protest, explaining in an article written for Ceasefire Magazine that he did so because of Westwood's decision to broadcast a segment of his show from Camp Bastion in Afghanistan; Lowkey argued that Westwood's decision amounted to an endorsement of the war in Afghanistan.

In May 2017, Lowkey endorsed Labour Party leader Jeremy Corbyn in the 2017 UK general election. He said: "We have a choice between policies which foster empathy and policies which foster greed, resentment, estrangement and alienation." In November 2019, along with other public figures, Lowkey signed a letter supporting Corbyn and describing him as "a beacon of hope in the struggle against emergent far-right nationalism, xenophobia and racism in much of the democratic world" and endorsed him in the 2019 UK general election. In the same month, along with 34 other musicians, he signed a letter endorsing Corbyn in the 2019 UK general election with a call to end austerity. In December 2019, along with 42 other cultural figures, he signed a letter endorsing the Labour Party under Corbyn's leadership in the 2019 general election. The letter stated that "Labour's election manifesto under Jeremy Corbyn's leadership offers a transformative plan that prioritises the needs of people and the planet over private profit and the vested interests of a few."

Lowkey was critical of the response to the Grenfell Tower fire in 2017 stating that "the tragic event was a result of the injustice and criminality at the heart of Britain’s current political system".

During the Gaza war, Lowkey has appeared on Piers Morgan Uncensored and criticized Israel's conduct and media coverage of the conflict.

== Other work ==
In July 2008, the Theatre Royal, Bath put on a production of Max and Beth, a contemporary adaptation of Macbeth by William Shakespeare written by Lowkey entirely in rhyme. Lowkey also helped publicise the NSPCC's Don't Hide It campaign, and contributed a free song to it, in which his lyrics are delivered from the perspective of a female victim of sexual abuse. He also formed a non-profit organisation, People's Army with fellow rapper Logic, with whom he has also made an unreleased album with (New World Order), and met up with then-Liberal Democrats leader Menzies Campbell as a representative of his local community. He has written articles for The Guardian and left-wing website Ceasefire Magazine. He hosts a podcast on MintPress News.

== Reception ==
Lowkey is frequently described in media as a conscious hip-hop artist and is noted for his politically charged lyricism. Critics and analyses have pointed to the consistency and intellectual depth of his work, noting that his discography forms "an ongoing investigation into state power, militarism, and corporate complicity" sustained across decades. His sophomore album, Soundtrack to the Struggle (2011), is considered a "cult classic" that debuted at number one on the UK hip-hop charts and demonstrated his ability to fuse the personal with the political, noting that while his work is political, it maintains musical depth through varied production, storytelling, and moments of personal introspection on tracks dealing with mental health and family. The 2019 follow-up, Soundtrack to the Struggle 2, was met with critical acclaim, with The Canary describing it as the "most important album of the decade".

== Discography ==
=== Studio albums ===
List of studio albums, with selected chart positions
| Title | Album details | Peak chart positions | | |
| Title | Album details | UK | UK IND | UK R&B |
|---|---|---|---|---|
| Dear Listener | Released: 20 October 2008; Label: SO Empire Recordings; Formats: CD, Digital download | — | — | — |
| Soundtrack to the Struggle | Released: 16 October 2011; Label: Mesopotamia Music; Formats: CD, digital download | 57 | 9 | 6 |
| Soundtrack to the Struggle 2 | Released: 5 April 2019; Label: Mesopotamia Music; Formats: Digital download | – | 26 | 2 |

=== Collaboration albums ===
- Poisonous Poetry (2005) (with Poisonous Poets)
- Better Than Heavy (2009) (with Mongrel)

=== Mixtapes ===
- Key to the Game, Vol. 1 (2003)
- Key to the Game, Vol. 2: Still Underground (2004)
- Key to the Game, Vol. 3 (2005)
- The Dubs Mixtape (2007) (with Stylah, hosted by DJ Limelight)

=== Extended plays ===
- Unplugged, Vol. 1 (2018)

=== Compilation albums ===
- The Past, The Present and The Future: The Road to Mongrel (2008)
- Uncensored (2009)
- The Best of Lowkey (US Version) (2010)

=== Singles ===
| Title | Year | Album |
|---|---|---|
| "Politics" | 2004 | Non-album single |
| "London" | 2005 | Key to the Game, Vol. 3 |
| "Tears to Laughter" | 2009 | Non-album single |
| "Voices of the Voiceless" (with Immortal Technique) | 2009 | Soundtrack to the Struggle |
| "We Don't Want Them" | 2009 | Non-album single |
| "Alphabet Assassin" | 2009 | Dear Listener |
| "Something Wonderful" | 2010 | Soundtrack to the Struggle |
| "Revolution Music" (featuring Faith SFX & Reverend and the Makers) | 2010 | Non-album single |
| "Terrorist?" | 2010 | Soundtrack to the Struggle |
| "Obama Nation" | 2010 | Soundtrack to the Struggle |
| "Ahmed" (featuring Mai Khalil) | 2016 | Soundtrack to the Struggle 2 |
| "Children of Diaspora" (featuring Mai Khalil) | 2016 | Soundtrack to the Struggle 2 |
| "Ghosts of Grenfell" (featuring Mai Khalil) | 2017 | Soundtrack to the Struggle 2 |
| "The Death of Neoliberalism" | 2017 | Soundtrack to the Struggle 2 |
| "Lords of War" (featuring Kaia) | 2017 | Soundtrack to the Struggle 2 |
| "McDonald Trump" | 2018 | Soundtrack to the Struggle 2 |
| "Sunday Morning" (featuring Mai Khalil) | 2018 | Soundtrack to the Struggle 2 |
| "Ghosts of Grenfell 2" (featuring Kaia) | 2018 | Soundtrack to the Struggle 2 |
| "The Return of Lowkey" | 2019 | Soundtrack to the Struggle 2 |
| "Goat Flow" | 2019 | Soundtrack to the Struggle 2 |
| "Iraq2Chile" (featuring Mai Khalil) | 2020 | Non-album single |
| "Daily Duppy" | 2020 | Non-album single |
| "Baby Steps" | 2020 | Soundtrack to the Struggle 3 |
| "I Still Believe 2020" | 2020 | Non-album single |
| "Refuse To Kill" | 2021 | Non-album single |
| "Palestine Will Never Die" | 2021 | Soundtrack to the Struggle 3 |
