= Wireless Festival =

English annual rap and hip-hop music festival held in London

Coordinates: 51.5713°N 0.1018°W

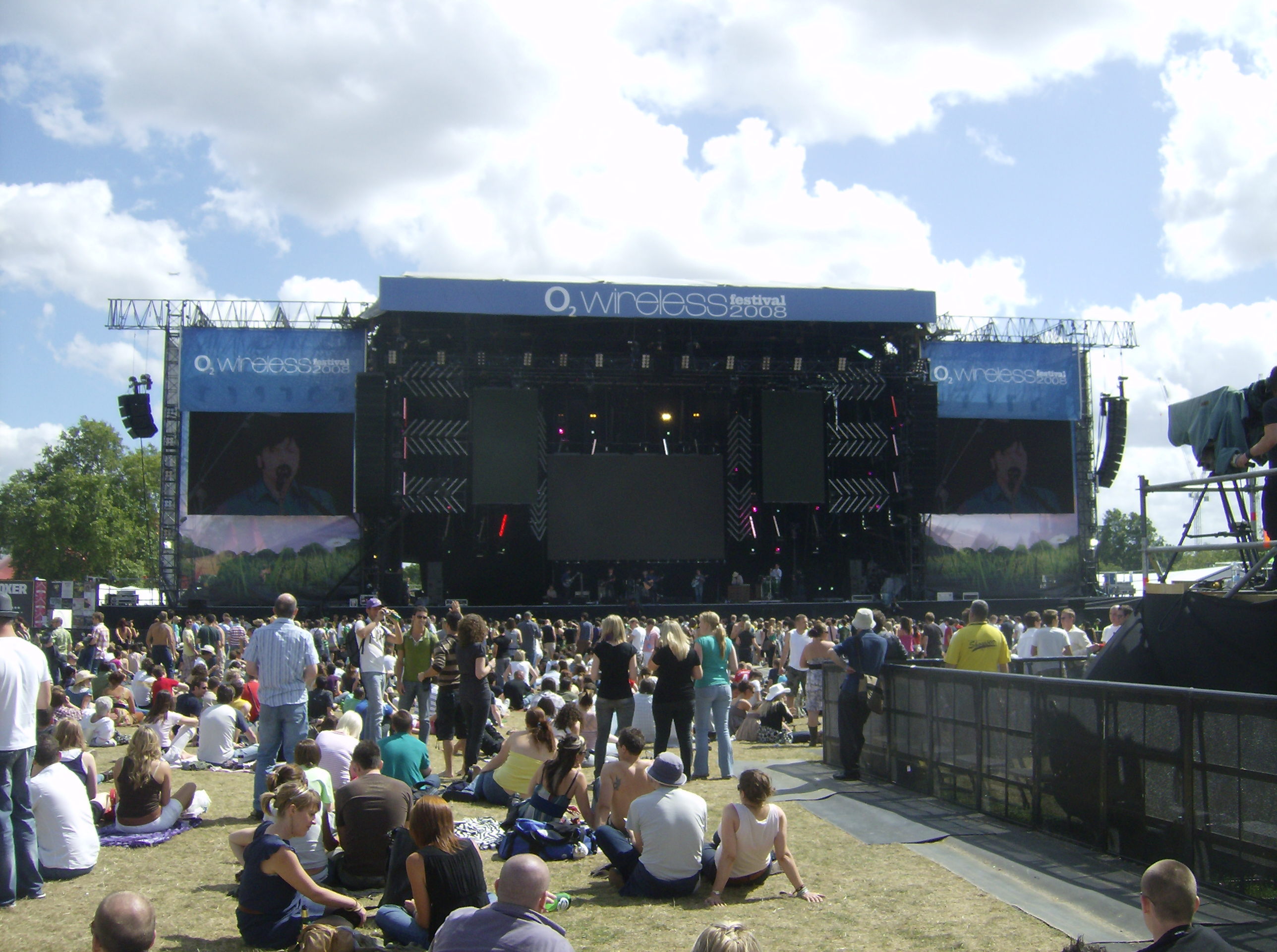
- Main stage of the 2008 Wireless Festival.
- Genre: Hip hop
- Locations: 2005–2012: Hyde Park, London; 2006–07: Harewood House, Leeds; 2013: Olympic Park, London; 2014: Perry Park, Birmingham; 2014–2019: Finsbury Park, London; 2021: Crystal Palace Park, London; 2022: Crystal Palace Park; Finsbury Park; NEC, Birmingham; 2023–present: Finsbury Park, London
- Years active: 2005–present
- Founders: Live Nation Entertainment
- Next event: TBD (Note: The 2026 festival was cancelled after the Home Office blocked the planned headliner, Kanye West, from entering the UK.)
- Capacity: 50,000
- Organiser: Live Nation and Festival Republic
- Sponsor: Vacant
- Website: wirelessfestival.co.uk

Wireless Festival is an annual rap and hip-hop music festival, owned and managed by Live Nation, that takes place in London, England. Debuting in 2005, the festival's earlier years primarily featured rock and pop artists; since the 2010s, the focus has shifted largely towards hip-hop and other genres, such as urban contemporary music.

From its 2005 inception until 2008, the festival was sponsored by telecommunications company O2, and was called the O2 Wireless Festival. From 2009 to 2012, the main sponsor was Barclaycard, and the festival was renamed to Barclaycard Wireless Festival. In 2013, the sponsor changed to Yahoo!, thus renaming it to Yahoo! Wireless. From 2015 to 2020, the festival's official partners were the carbonated soft drinks Pepsi and Pepsi Max. Delivery company Gopuff were the official sponsor in 2021 and remained as the sponsor in the 2023 edition of the festival. Sponsorship again changed in 2024, to be partnered with PepsiCo's Rockstar Energy; in 2026, PepsiCo pulled its sponsorship after the controversial booking of the American rapper Kanye West. The 2026 event was later cancelled following the denial of West's Electronic Travel Authorisation by the Home Office.

The capacity of the 2023 event was just shy of 50,000 people. Adjacent festivals were held in Leeds in 2006 and 2007, as well as Birmingham in 2014. In 2017, Live Nation also established Wireless Germany in Frankfurt, as well as Wireless Middle East in Abu Dhabi.

== History ==
=== 2005 ===
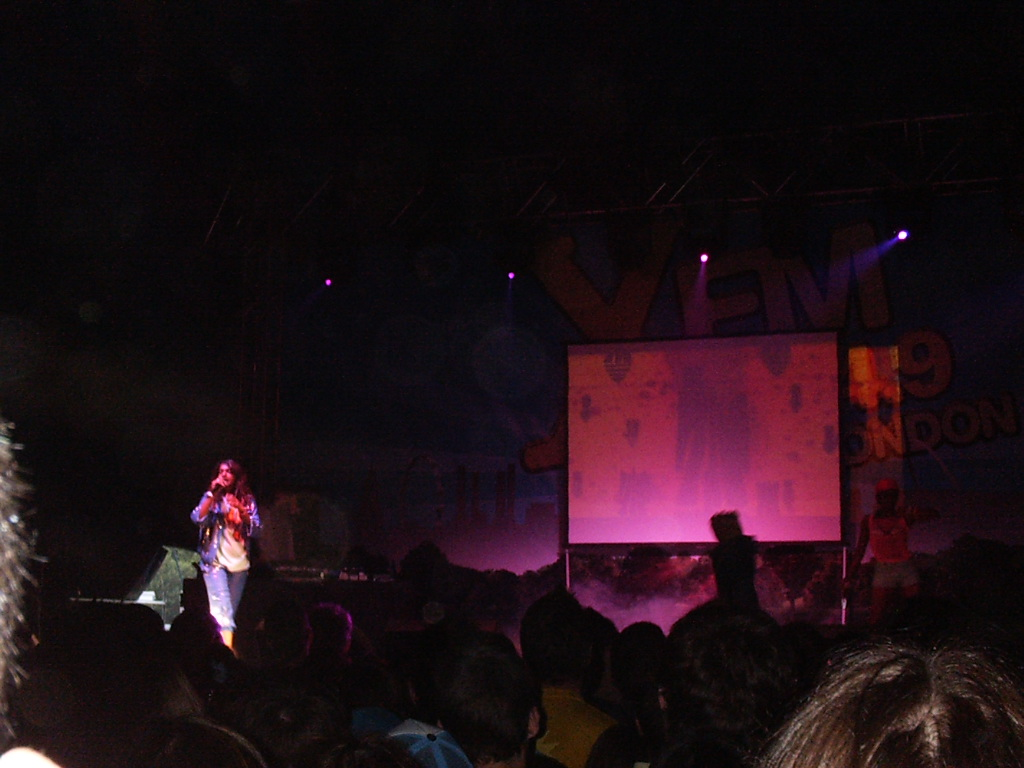
M.I.A. performing on the XFM stage in 2005

The first festival took place in June 2005 and was in Hyde Park only. Tickets were £35 a day. Some of the acts on the line-up were (headline acts in bold):

- Friday, 24 June: **New Order**, Moby, Hard-Fi, The Bravery, Graham Coxon, The Dresden Dolls, The Dears, Rilo Kiley
- Saturday, 25 June: **Basement Jaxx**, M.I.A., LCD Soundsystem, Death In Vegas, Lady Sovereign, Killa Kela, Mylo, Roots Manuva, Stereo MCs
- Wednesday, 29 June: **Keane**, Echo & the Bunnymen, Supergrass, James Blunt, Brendan Benson, Rufus Wainwright, Martha Wainwright
- Thursday, 30 June: **Kasabian**, Editors, The Rakes, The Others, Ladytron, Soulwax, Peter Doherty, JJ72, Cut Copy

=== 2006 ===
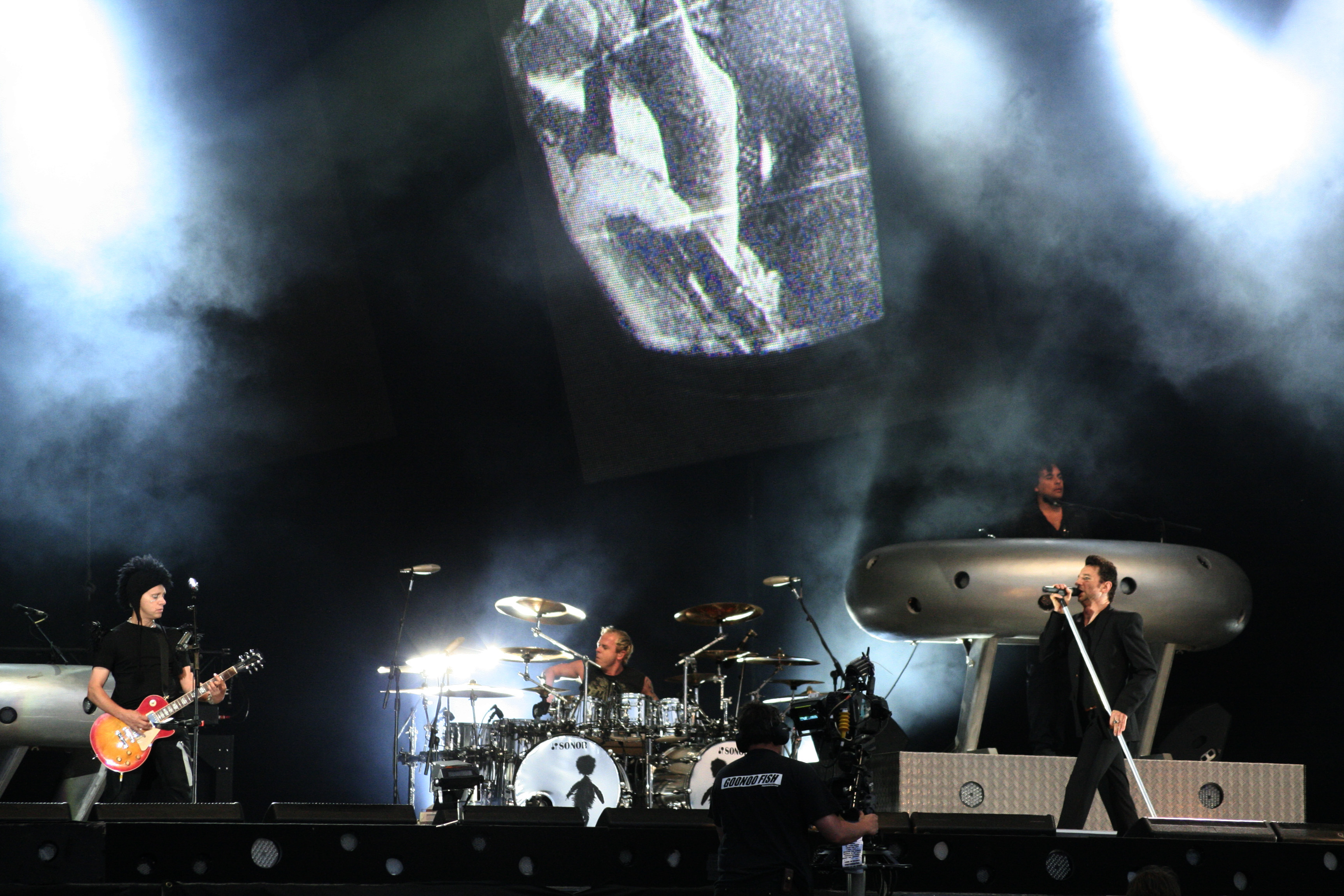
Depeche Mode headlining the 2006 festival

In 2006, the festival played in both Hyde Park and Harewood House. Tickets were £37.51 per day.

The Hyde Park festival ran from 21 to 25 June and on the bill were:

- **The Strokes**, Belle & Sebastian, Dirty Pretty Things, Super Furry Animals, The Raconteurs, Gogol Bordello, The Like
- **David Gray**, Fun Lovin' Criminals, KT Tunstall, Violent Femmes
- **Massive Attack**, The Flaming Lips, Pharrell, Gnarls Barkley, Metric, Damian Marley
- **James Blunt**, Zero 7, Eels, Beth Orton, Paolo Nutini
- **Depeche Mode**, Goldfrapp, OK Go, The Dears, The Fratellis, Mystery Jets

The Harewood House festival ran from 24 to 25 June and tickets were £32.50 for the first day and £37.50 for the second. It featured:

- **Massive Attack**, Goldfrapp, DJ Shadow, Pharrell, Gnarls Barkley, Terry Callier, Just Jack, Sway
- **The Who**, Super Furry Animals, The Flaming Lips, The Zutons, Eels

=== 2007 ===
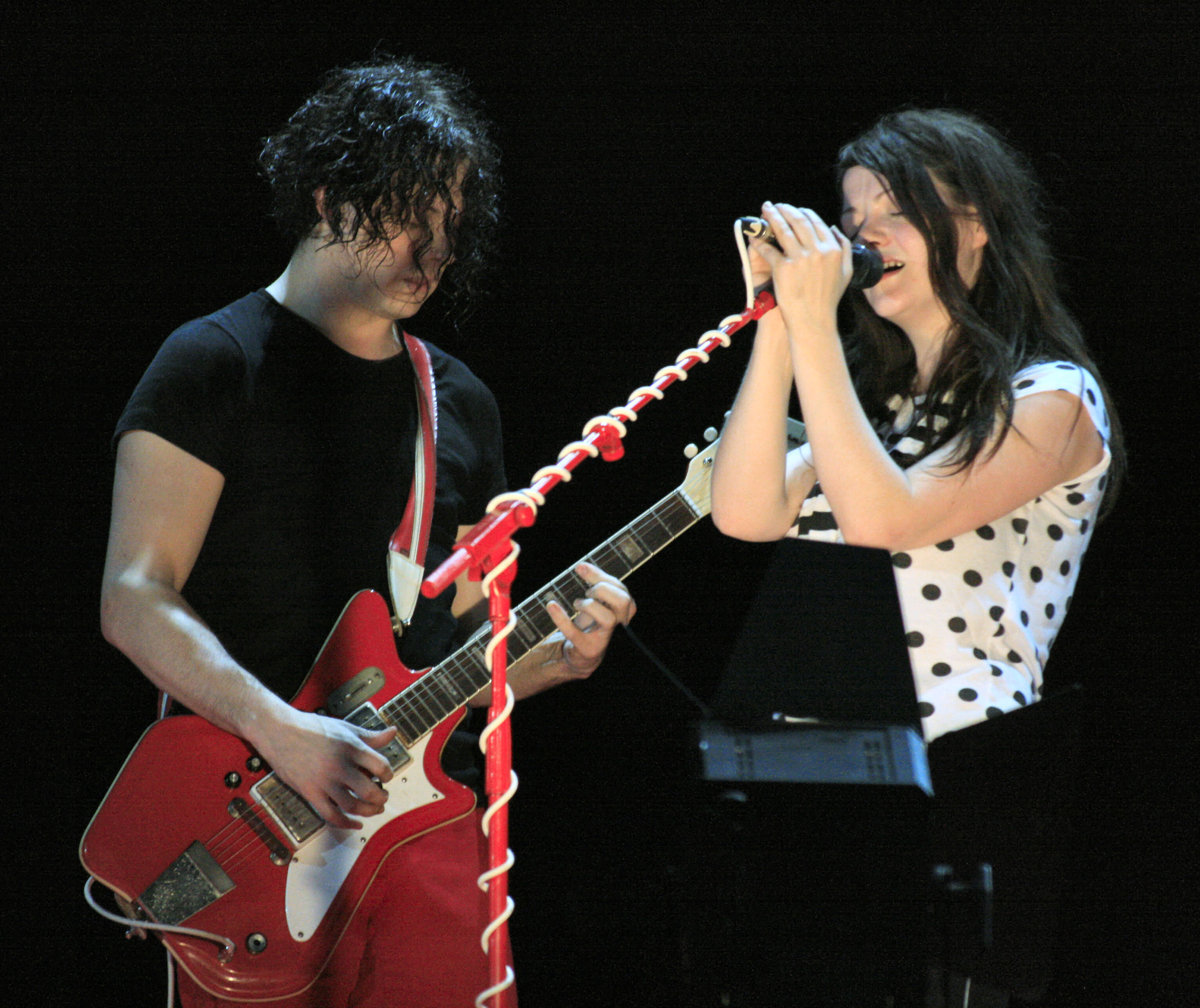
The White Stripes headline 2007's festival

Tickets for both venues went on sale on 16 March 2007 and the festival took place between 14 and 17 June in Hyde Park, and 15–17 June at Harewood House. Tickets were £40 for one day, £75 for two, £105 for three or £135 for four days.

The acts for both Hyde Park and Harewood House were:

- **The White Stripes**, Queens of the Stone Age, Air, Satellite Party, The Bees, The Thrills, The Sounds, Dredg, Polytechnic, Ghosts, Connan and the Mockasins, Far From The Dance, Kissaway Trail, Pete and the Pirates, The Scare
- **Daft Punk**, LCD Soundsystem, Klaxons, CSS, Plan B, New Young Pony Club, Calvin Harris, Simian Mobile Disco, Digitalism,
- **Kaiser Chiefs**, Editors, The Cribs, The Rakes, The Twang, The Only Ones, Kate Nash, Ripchord, The Duke Spirit, Polysics, Mumm-Ra, The Pigeon Detectives, You Say Party! We Say Die!, Los Campesinos!, and Under the Influence of Giants. Kaiser Chiefs selected the line-up for the day they were headlining (Saturday at Harewood House and Sunday in Hyde Park).

The acts which performed the extra date in Hyde Park were:

- **Faithless**, Badly Drawn Boy, Kelis, Just Jack and Cat Empire.

For the first time, the Leeds festival offered camping facilities at the festival. Campers were allowed to stay on Lord Harewood's land for £25 for as many festival days as they wished. There were 3 stages this year, and the O2 Blueroom where only O2 customers were allowed to enter.

=== 2008 ===
The 2008 O2 Wireless Festival spanned 4 days in Hyde Park, and was the last to carry the O2 sponsorship. An attempt to hold a parallel festival in Leeds similar to the Reading and Leeds Festivals arrangement was unsuccessful, and instead a variety of club nights featuring billed artists were held. Tickets were £45 per day.

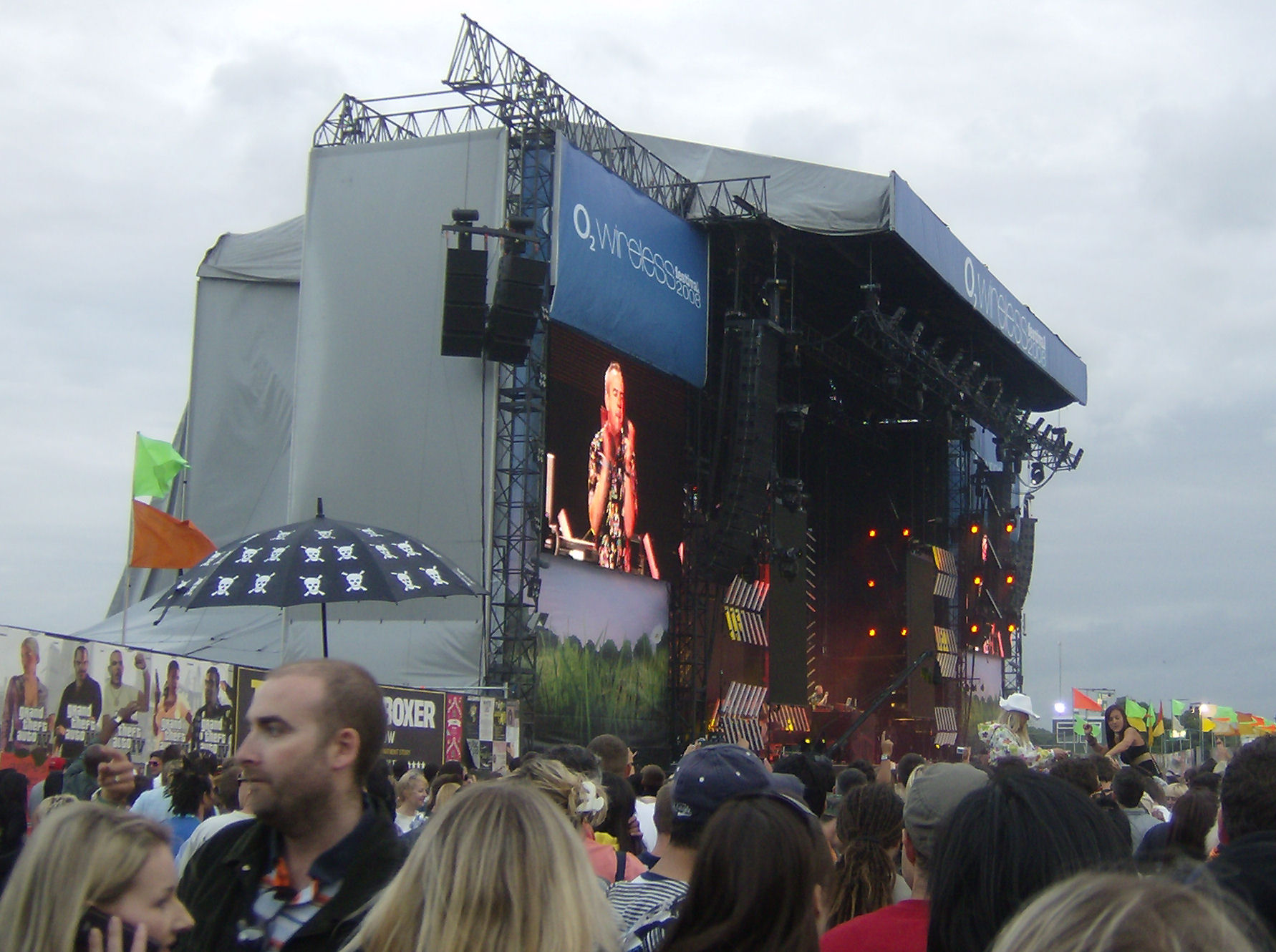
Fatboy Slim on the main stage on Saturday 5 July

The line-up was as follows:

- Thursday, 3 July: **Jay-Z**, Mark Ronson, Hot Chip, Róisín Murphy, David Jordan, The Cool Kids, Hercules and Love Affair, Alice Smith, Kano, Saul Williams, Lethal Bizzle, Elliot Minor, Pete and the Pirates, The Stiff Dylans, Sparkadia, The Hot Melts, Electric Dolls, Beans On Toast, Red Snapper, Annie, Bryn Christophers, Kid Sisters, Tinie Tempah, Yelle
- Friday, 4 July: **Morrissey**, Beck, The Wombats, Guillemots, Dirty Pretty Things, Lightspeed Champion, The National, Siouxsie Sioux, The Courteeners, Black Kids, The Rascals, The Hosts, Kristeen Young, Howling Bells, Magic Wands, The Whigs, Nicole Atkins and the Sea, Mon Ouisch, The Fashion, The Reprieve, New York Dolls, Get Cape. Wear Cape. Fly, Liam Finn, Apollo Sunshine, Seawolf, Jaguar Love, Peter and the Wolf
- Saturday, 5 July: **Fatboy Slim**, Deadmau5, Robyn, Bootsy Collins, Neon Neon, Cornershop, Ryan Shaw, Underworld, MSTRKRFT, Does It Offend You, Yeah?, Sam Sparro, Cut Copy, Dan Le Sac Vs Scroobius Pip, The Whip, Junkie XL, Akala, Audio Bullys, Cagedbaby, Japanese Pop Stars, Familien, Yacht, Booka Shade, Why?, Das Pop, InnerPartySystem
- Sunday, 6 July: **Counting Crows**, Ben Harper, Powderfinger, Goo Goo Dolls, Eddy Grant, Magic Christian, The Hold Steady, Bowling For Soup, Donavon Frankenreiter, Delays, Melee, Luke White, Galactic with Lyrics Born and Boots Riley, Roy World, Joe Purdy, Amy Studt, Dawn Kinnard, The Galvatrons, Silver Seas, Chief, Nellie McKay, Alice Smith, Ryan Shaw, Sons of Albion, Pablo Francisco, Jamie Kennedy, Jo Koy, Gabriel Iglesias

=== 2009 ===
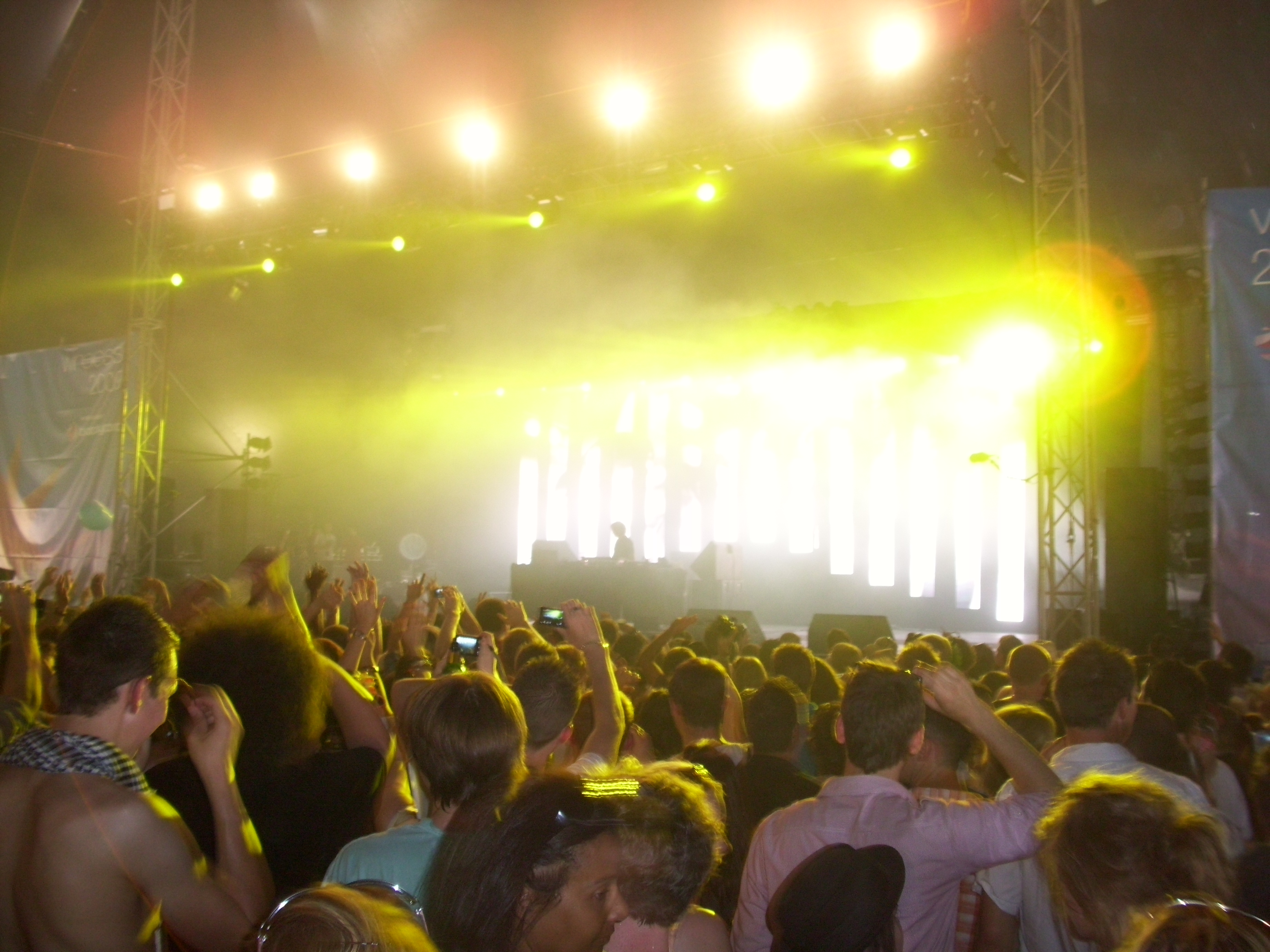
Paul Oakenfold on Stage Two on Saturday 4 July

The 2009 festival was sponsored by Barclaycard and was cut from four to two days in Hyde Park. Tickets were £45 for one day or £80 for both. The line-up was as follows:

- Saturday, 4 July: **Basement Jaxx**, The Streets, Dizzee Rascal, Paul Oakenfold, Metric, Jack Peñate, Saint Etienne, Afrika Bambaataa & the Soulsonic Force, Frankmusik, Sneaky Sound System, N.A.S.A., Tommy Sparks, Delphic, Filthy Dukes, Digitalism, Skint & Demoralised, Master Shortie, Japanese Popstars, Phenomenal Handclap Band
- Sunday, 5 July: **Kanye West**, Noisettes, Alesha Dixon, Calvin Harris, N-Dubz, Tinchy Stryder, Q-Tip, Flo Rida, Kid Cudi, Daniel Merriweather, Lady Sovereign, Young Jeezy, Mr Hudson, Chipmunk, Ironik, Example, Florence Rawlings, Zarif, Steve Appleton, The Black and White Years, Diversity, Ratatat

=== 2010 ===
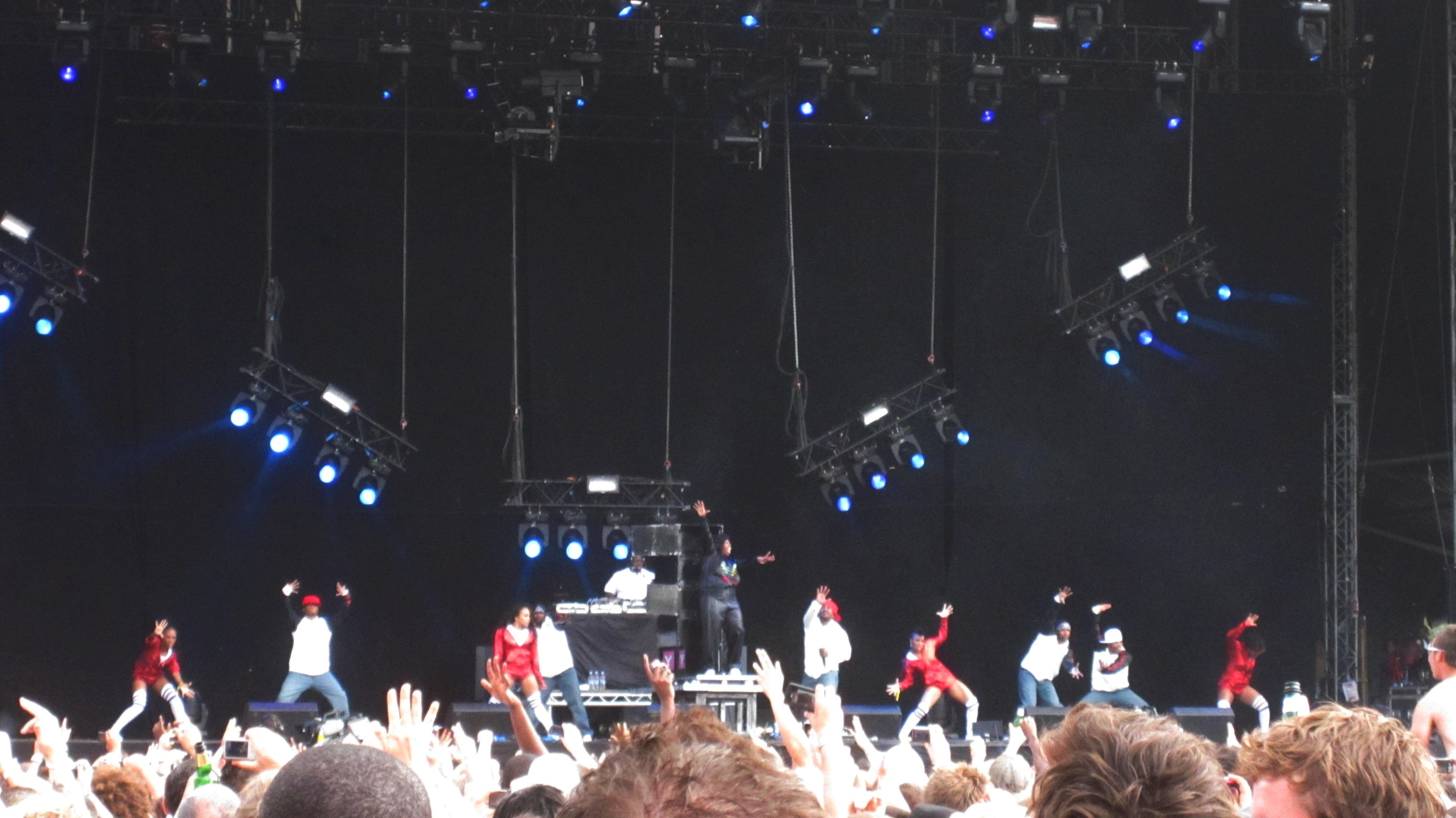
Missy Elliott performance in Saturday, 3 July.

The 2010 Wireless Festival was increased to three days and took place from 2 July to 4 July 2010. Tickets were £47.50 for one day, £85 for two and £110 for three days. The line-up was as follows:

- Friday, 2 July: **P!nk**, The Ting Tings, Gossip, The Temper Trap, Plan B, Bowling For Soup, Hockey, Daisy Dares You, Neon Hitch, Taylor Hawkins and the Coattail Riders, Bluey Robinson
- Saturday, 3 July: **LCD Soundsystem**, Snoop Dogg, 2ManyDJs (aka Soulwax), Kids on Bridges, The Big Pink, DJ Shadow, UNKLE, Missy Elliott, The Hundred in the Hands, Phenomenal Handclap Band
- Sunday, 4 July: **Jay-Z**, Lily Allen, Friendly Fires, Slash, Mr Hudson, dan le sac Vs Scroobius Pip, Chipmunk, Tinie Tempah, Chase & Status, D12, Wiley, Roll Deep, J. Cole, Chiddy Bang, Wale, Professor Green, Laura Steel, Talay Riley, McLean, Bluey Robinson, Hesta Prynn.

The Sunday date sold out in record time, three weeks before the festival.

=== 2011 ===
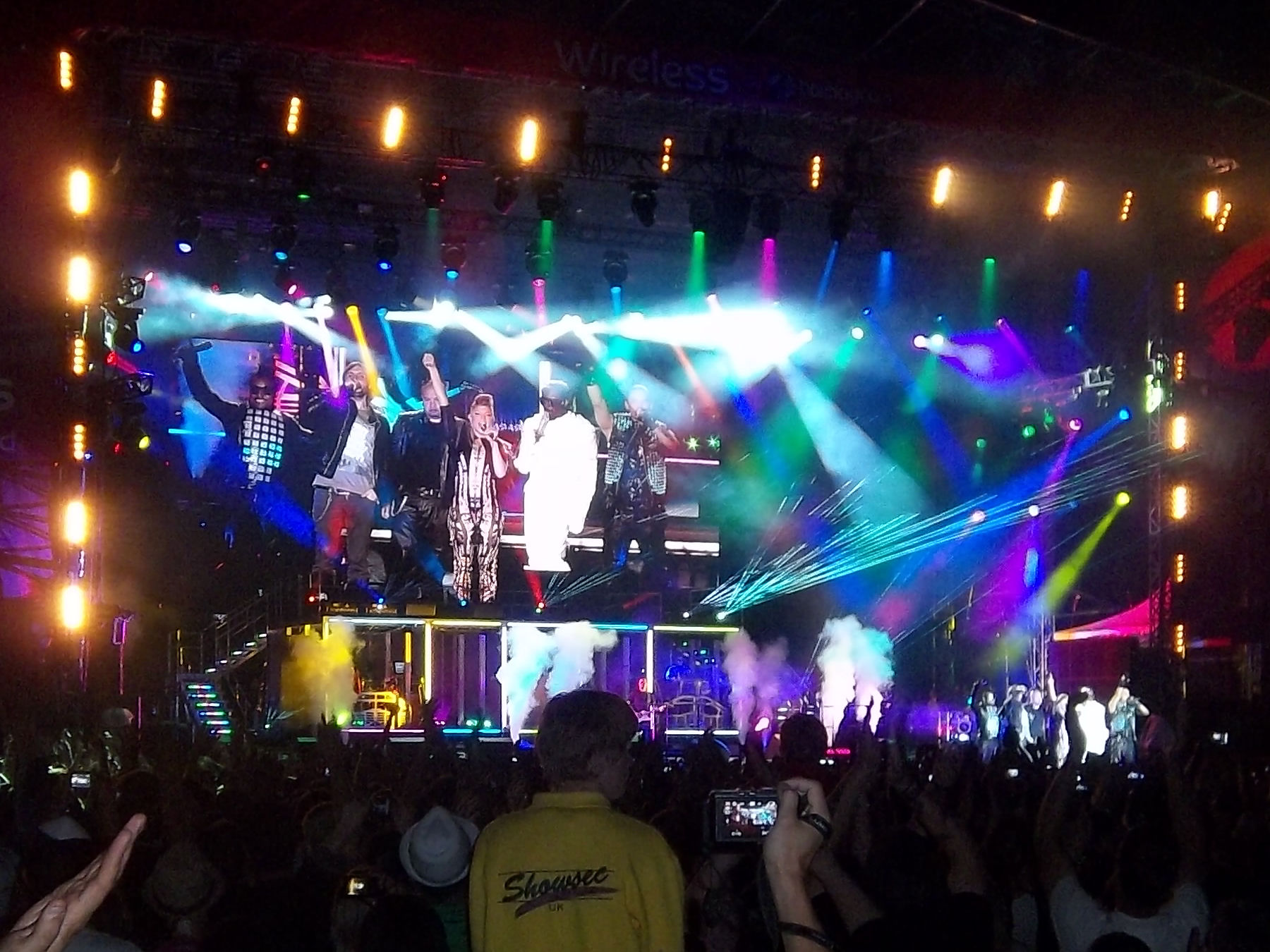
The Black Eyed Peas headline the 2011 festival

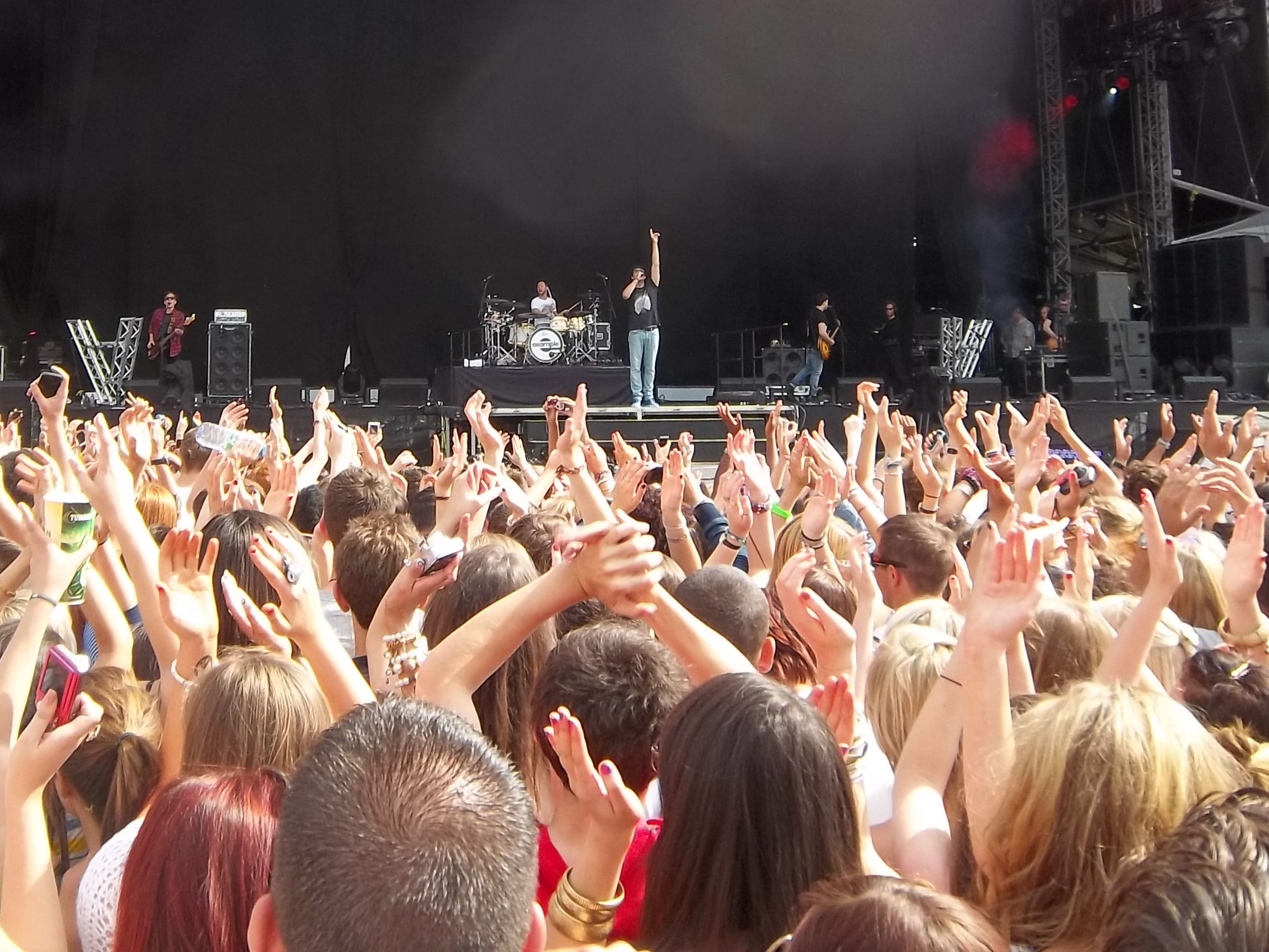
Example on the Friday

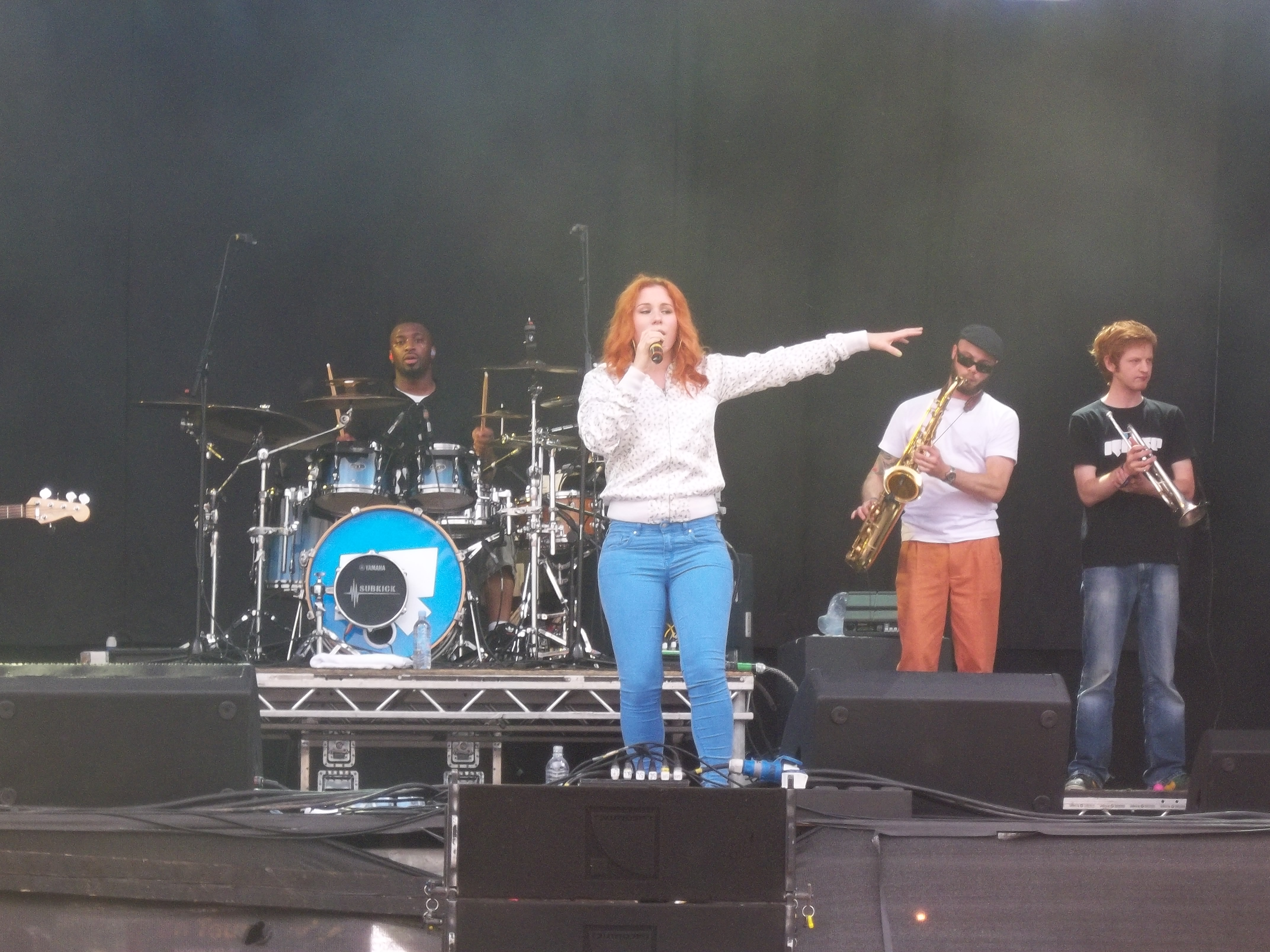
Katy B on the Saturday

The 2011 Wireless Festival was held from Friday 1 July to Sunday 3 July 2011. Tickets were £48.50 (Saturday/Sunday) or £49.50 (Friday) for one day, £92 for two and £130 for three days. The Black Eyed Peas headlined the Friday, The Chemical Brothers on the Saturday, and Pulp reformed after ten years to play the Sunday and other festivals in 2011. The Black Eyed Peas date had sold out by the end of June, while tickets for the other two days remained on sale until the festival.

**Line-up**
Friday	Saturday	Sunday
**The Black Eyed Peas**; David Guetta; Bruno Mars; Plan B Tinie Tempah; Chipmunk; Example; Labrinth; Jodie Connor; Far East Movement; Yasmin; Wretch 32; Mike Posner; Alexis Jordan; Natalia Kills; Dot Rotten; StooShe	**The Chemical Brothers**; The Streets; Chase & Status; Aphex Twin; Chromeo; Janelle Monáe; Kesha; LMFAO; Nero; Katy B Devlin; Digitalism; Battles; The Whip; Justin Robertson; Jay Electronica; J. Cole; Modestep; Maverick Sabre; Michael Franti & Spearhead; Her Majesty & The Wolves; Alex Metric; Alpines; Luke Bingham; James Holroyd	**Pulp**; Grace Jones; TV on the Radio; Foals; The Horrors; Metronomy; Cut Copy; Devotchka; The Like; The Naked and Famous; The Pretty Reckless; Roky Erickson; Neon Trees; Funeral Party; Fight Like Apes; Summer Camp

=== 2012 ===
The 2012 Wireless Festival was held from Friday, 6 July to Sunday, 8 July. Tickets went on general sale on 18 November 2011, priced at £49.50 (Friday/Saturday) and £52.50 (Sunday), plus booking fee. All tickets for the Rihanna day sold out by the end of March, a new record for the festival.

The acts which played were:

**Line-up**
Friday	Saturday	Sunday
Main Stage **Deadmau5**; Afrojack; The Roots; Maverick Sabre; Metric Pepsi Max Stage; Knife Party; Feed Me; Santigold; Modestep; Childish Gambino Barclaycard Unwind Stage; Jaguar Skills; Ms. Dynamite; Zeds Dead; Gemini; AraabMuzik; Zedd Bandstand Stage; Pro Dot; RuN RiOT; Brave New Storm	Main Stage **Drake**; Nicki Minaj; Example; Wiz Khalifa; Professor Green; Tulisa; Rita Ora Pepsi Max Stage; Nero; The Weeknd; Labrinth; Delilah; D'banj; Hilltop Hoods; Clement Marfo & The Frontline; MistaJam Barclaycard Unwind Stage; Chiddy Bang; Dot Rotten; The-Dream; Lady Leshurr; Sway; Sneakbo; Angel; KOAN Sound; Aluna George Bandstand Stage; Mikill Pane; Krept & Konan; Josh Osho; Queen of Hearts; The Other Tribe; Bakery Boys	Main Stage **Rihanna**; Jessie J J. Cole; Rizzle Kicks; Labrinth; Pitbull; Cher Lloyd Pepsi Max Stage; Calvin Harris; Kaskade; Madeon; ASAP Rocky; Flux Pavilion; Lloyd; StooShe Barclaycard Unwind Stage; Far East Movement; Theophilus London; Doctor P Rascals; Kreayshawn; L Marshall; Monsta; Steve Papa Edwards Bandstand Stage; K Koke; Steve Papa Edwards; Cleo Sol; Ny; Skyline

=== 2013 ===
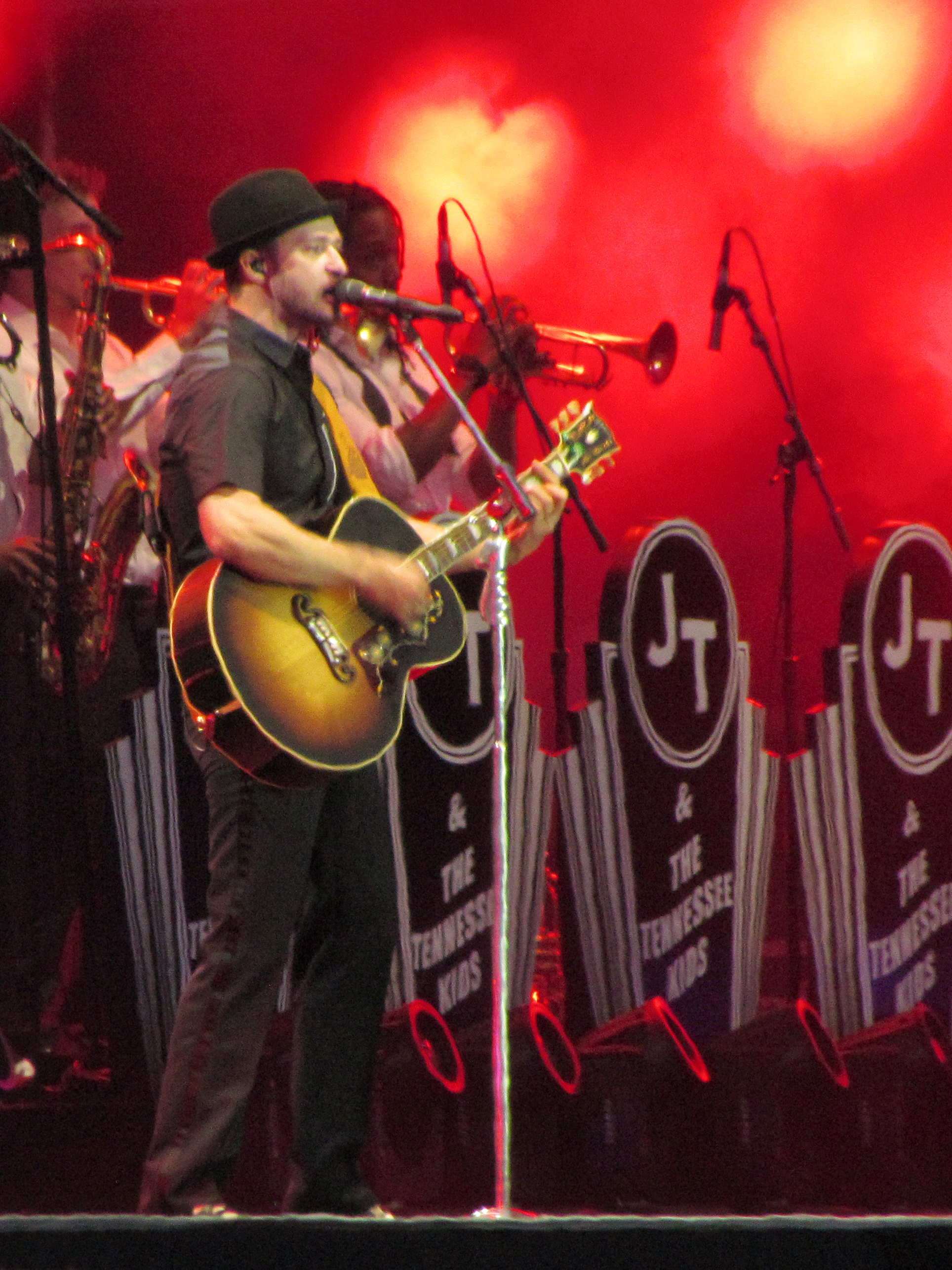
Justin Timberlake performing on Friday 12

The 2013 event was moved to the Queen Elizabeth Olympic Park in Stratford after Live Nation pulled out of the tender for Hyde Park due to curfew issues. The festival was held from Friday, 12 July to Sunday, 14 July 2013, and tickets were priced at £57.50 for day tickets and £110 for two days, plus booking fees. The event was sponsored by Yahoo!.

The line-up for the festival was:

**Line-up**
Friday	Saturday	Sunday
**Justin Timberlake**; Snoop Dogg; Trey Songz; John Legend; Frank Ocean; Miguel; Kesha; Wretch 32; Conor Maynard; Bingo Players	**Jay-Z**; Emeli Sandé; Rita Ora; Kendrick Lamar; Miguel; DJ Fresh; Calvin Harris; Macklemore & Ryan Lewis; Flux Pavilion; Zedd; Iggy Azalea; Devlin; Taboo	**Jay-Z & Justin Timberlake (Rihanna)** will.i.am A Tribe Called Quest; Nas; ASAP Rocky; Rizzle Kicks; Katy B Jessie Ware; Big Sean; Magnetic Man; 2 Chainz; Porter Robinson; Misha B

=== 2014 ===
In February 2014 it was confirmed that Wireless Festival 2014 would be held at Finsbury Park, London and Perry Park, Birmingham. The event was held over the weekend of 4–6 July 2014, on three stages. London day tickets were priced at £71.50 while Birmingham day tickets were priced at £68.75. Weekend tickets for London went on sale at £210 while Birmingham weekend tickets were set at £172. On 3 July, the day before the first day of the festival, it was widely reported that Drake had pulled out due to illness, (making it the second time he had pulled out of a Wireless Festival). This was confirmed on the festival's social media sites and organisers announced that Kanye West would play instead of Drake in London, and Rudimental (who had been the support for Drake) would headline the Friday in Birmingham with a special extended set featuring very special guests. The organisers also offered those attending on Friday in Birmingham £20 of "Wireless Credit" which was redeemable against any concessions, merchandise stands and funfair attractions at the event.

London

**Line-up**
Friday	Saturday	Sunday
**Kanye West**; Pharrell Williams; Basement Jaxx; 2 Chainz; Iggy Azalea; Giorgio Moroder; Foxes; Ella Eyre; Angel Haze; Joel Compass; Vic Mensa; Jess Glynne	**Kanye West**; Rudimental; Knife Party; Wiz Khalifa; Azealia Banks; Pretty Lights; B.o.B. Chance the Rapper; Earl Sweatshirt; Kwabs; A$AP Ferg; G-Eazy; YG; Sage the Gemini	**Bruno Mars**; Outkast; Ellie Goulding; J. Cole; John Newman; Salt-N-Pepa; Clean Bandit; Bleachers; A Great Big World; Raleigh Ritchie; Becky Hill; Dominique Young Unique

Birmingham

**Line-up**
Friday	Saturday	Sunday
Rudimental; Knife Party; Wiz Khalifa; Azealia Banks; Pretty Lights; B.o.B. Chance the Rapper; Earl Sweatshirt; Kwabs; A$AP Ferg; G-Eazy; YG; Sage the Gemini; Labrinth; ScHoolBoy Q Jacob Banks; Wilkinson; Krept & Konan; Lizzo; All About She; Mack Wilds; M.O	**Bruno Mars**; Outkast; Ellie Goulding; J. Cole; John Newman; Salt-N-Pepa; Clean Bandit; Bleachers; A Great Big World; Raleigh Ritchie; Becky Hill; Dominique Young Unique; Alexa Goddard; Robin Thicke; Sean Paul; Neon Jungle; Naughty Boy; Say Lou Lou; Indiana; Rixton; Sasha Keable; Elli Ingram; Nick Brewer; Javeon	**Kanye West**; Pharrell Williams; Basement Jaxx; 2 Chainz; Iggy Azalea; Giorgio Moroder; Foxes; Ella Eyre; Angel Haze; Joel Compass; Vic Mensa; Jess Glynne; Tinie Tempah; Jon Bellion; DJ Cassidy; World's Fair; Kid Ink; Meridian Dan; Tori Kelly; Etta Bond; Blonde; Sinead Harnett; Jester; Alec Benjamin

=== 2015 ===
On 31 January 2015, it was confirmed that the festival would be held in Finsbury Park between 3 and 5 July. The lineup was confirmed via the festival's Twitter page, with confirmation that Drake would return to the festival following his cancellation in 2014. It was also revealed that David Guetta and Nicki Minaj would perform as co-headliners on the Sunday, and that Avicii and Kendrick Lamar would be co-headlining on Saturday. As it was the festival's tenth birthday, there was a special 'birthday' event on Sunday, 28 June. Following the announcement of the lineup, several artists cancelled their appearance. In early June, Big Sean removed the Wireless appearance from his tour's website and he no longer appeared on the Wireless website's lineup. Around the same time, Boy Better Know were added to the Wireless 10 event. On 14 June, Stromae cancelled his Wireless appearance amongst other summer dates, after suffering a reaction to anti-malaria drugs whilst on his tour of Sub-Saharan Africa. Jess Glynne tweeted a day later to say she would also be cancelling a number of summer dates, including Wireless, due to having to undergo vocal chord surgery. The Friday sold out by the end of April, whilst the other three dates remained on sale until the festival.

**Line-up**
**Main Stage**
Sunday 28 June	Friday 3 July	Saturday 4 July	Sunday 5 July
**Drake**; Rita Ora; Chance the Rapper; Katy B Kid Ink; G-Eazy; Disturbing London X DJ Charlesy Present: Sneakbo, Yungen, J Hus, Bugzy Malone and Section Boyz	**Drake**; ASAP Rocky; Major Lazer; Labrinth; Joey Badass; Fuse ODG; Maverick Sabre	**Avicii**; **Kendrick Lamar**; Childish Gambino; Gorgon City; Mary J Blige; Tinashe; Raleigh Ritchie; Conor Maynard	**David Guetta** + **Nicki Minaj**; Jessie J Clean Bandit; August Alsina; Charli XCX; Wretch 32
**Stage 2/Pepsi Max Arena**
Sunday 28 June	Friday 3 July	Saturday 4 July	Sunday 5 July
Public Enemy; Boy Better Know; Black Star; Raekwon & Ghostface Killah; De La Soul; Jhene Aiko; ILoveMakonnen; Bishop Nehru	Nero; Duke Dumont; PartyNextDoor; Krept and Konan; G-Eazy; ILoveMakonnen; Vince Staples	Knife Party; Netsky; DJ Mustard; Indiana; Robin Schulz; MNEK; KStewart	Grandmaster Flash; Rae Sremmurd; Pusha T Ciara; Arrested Development; Logic; Kiko Bun
**Capital Xtra Presents Re:Wired Arena**
Sunday 28 June No Stage	Friday 3 July	Saturday 4 July	Sunday 5 July
	Lethal Bizzle; Klingande; Travis Scott; Ms. Dynamite; Collie Buddz; Little Simz; OCD: Moosh & Twist; Melissa Steel; Jermain Jackman	Kurupt FM; 3lau Stormzy; Sinead Harnett; Bad Rabbits; OWS; Etta Bond; Nick Brewer; Ady Suleiman	George the Poet; Shakka; Elliphant; Jaden Smith & Willow Smith; Tove Styrke; Jacob Plant; Damage; Samm Henshaw

=== 2016 ===
Wireless Festival 2016 was held on the weekend of 8–10 July at Finsbury Park. The lineup was announced on 9 March, with Calvin Harris to headline on the Friday, Chase & Status and J. Cole co-headlining on Saturday, and Kygo and Boy Better Know co-headlining on Sunday. On 16 March, Dua Lipa was announced for Friday. Three days later, Lady Leshurr was announced for Saturday. On 11 May, Wizkid and 99 Souls were announced for Friday, and Natalie La Rose, Angel, Shakka, Rude Kid, KStewart, The Manor, Jorja Smith, and A2 were announced for Saturday, while Fergie, Big Sean, Metro Boomin, Jay Sean, Ghetts, Thomas Jack, Fekky, Elf Kid, Sonny Digital and Father were announced for Sunday. On the same day, Lady Leshurr was moved to Friday. On 21 May Kyla was announced for Saturday. Wizkid had pulled out due to Visa problems.

**Line Up**
Friday	Saturday	Sunday
**Calvin Harris**; The 1975; Miguel; Bryson Tiller; Kurupt FM; Kwabs; Disciples; Vic Mensa; Big Narstie; Dua Lipa; Lady Leshurr; Anne-Marie; Yungen; 99 Souls; Geko; Petite Meller	**Chase & Status** / **J.Cole**; Future; Sigma; Krept and Konan; Craig David; ASAP Ferg; Wilkinson; Maverick Sabre; WSTRN; Bugzy Malone; Natalie La Rose; Jahkoy; Nadia Rose; Angel; Shakka; Rude Kid; KStewart; The Manor; DJ Semtex; Jorja Smith; A2; Kyla	**Boy Better Know** / **Kygo**; Martin Garrix; Jess Glynne; Fergie; Big Sean; Action Bronson; Kehlani; Section Boyz; Young Thug; Yelawolf; Jeremih; Vince Staples; Anderson Paak & The Free Nationals; Metro Boomin; Ty Dolla Sign; Dillon Francis; Newham Generals; Jay Sean; Ghetts; Logan Sama; Thomas Jack; Fekky; Bomba Estereo; Elf Kid; Sonny Digital; Father

=== 2017 ===
Wireless Festival 2017 was held on the weekend of 7–9 July at Finsbury Park. The lineup was announced on 23 February, with Chance The Rapper to headline on Friday, Skepta headlining on Saturday and The Weeknd headlining on Sunday. On 28 March, Fetty Wap and Geko were announced for Friday, Travis Scott was announced for Saturday, and Bugzy Malone and Kojo Funds were announced for Sunday. On the same day, Cadet was moved from Sunday to Saturday. On 30 June, AJ Tracey was announced for Friday. Lil Uzi Vert was also part of the lineup, but pulled out, due to continued exhaustion. He was replaced by Pusha T. Wiley was also part of the lineup but also pulled out, due to delays with his travel plan. He was replaced by Lethal Bizzle.

**Line Up**
Friday	Saturday	Sunday
**Chance The Rapper**; Bryson Tiller; G-Eazy; Fetty Wap; Zara Larsson; Post Malone; Flatbush Zombies; Lil Dicky; Big Narstie; AJ Tracey; Geko; Noname; Nef the Pharaoh	**Skepta**; Travis Scott; Rae Sremmurd; Young Thug; Sean Paul; Lil Yachty; Lethal Bizzle; Section Boyz; Yungen; Dave; MoStack; Cadet; Jez Dior; The Age Of L.U.N.A; Big Tobz; Young T & Bugsey	**The Weeknd**; Nas; Tory Lanez; Ty Dolla Sign; Wizkid; Pusha T Tyga; Desiigner; Bugzy Malone; Hilltop Hoods; Mike Skinner & Murkage Presnent Tonga; Stefflon Don; Yuna; AJ x Deno; Kojo Funds; Abra Cadabra; Topaz Jones

=== 2018 ===
Wireless festival was held on 6–8 July at Finsbury Park. The lineup was announced on 22 January, with J. Cole to headline on Friday, Stormzy on Saturday, and DJ Khaled with others on Sunday. The Festival was fully sold out within a day. On 9 April Cardi B announced her pregnancy, and therefore she pulled out. Three days later, Raye, Russ, Suspect, Big Shaq, Sneakbo, Davido, Ms Banks, Majid Jordan and Last Night In Paris were added to the lineup. On 14 May, AJ x Deno, EO, M Huncho, Just Banco, Big Heath, Romzy and Yung Fume were added to the lineup. On 3 July, J Hus pulled out due to legal issues. Fredo also pulled out due to unforeseen circumstances. On the same day, Krept & Konan, Chip, Avelino, D-Block Europe and Ambush were added to the lineup. On 5 July, MoStack was moved from Saturday to Friday. On the same day Trippie Redd pulled out, due to unforeseen circumstances. On the day that DJ Khaled was meant to be headlining, it was announced that he had pulled out due to travel issues. He was replaced by a surprise guest, who turned out to be Drake.

**Line Up**
Friday	Saturday	Sunday
**J. Cole**; Post Malone; PartyNextDoor; Big Sean; GoldLink; Wiley; Wretch 32; Mabel; MoStack; Kojo Funds; Belly Squad; Bas; Donae'o; Just Banco; Big Heath; AJ x Deno; EO	**Stormzy**; Migos; J Hus (Cancelled); Krept & Konan; French Montana; 6lack A Boogie Wit Da Hoodie; Belly; Majid Jordan; Davido; Big Shaq; Chip; Avelino; Hardy Caprio; Fredo (Cancelled); Ramz; Sneakbo; Raye; Ms Banks; Last Night In Paris; M Huncho; Yung Fume; Romzy; D-Block Europe; Ambush	**DJ Khaled and Friends** (cancelled); **Drake** (Unannounced); Giggs; Rae Sremmurd; Lil Uzi Vert; Russ; Cardi B (Cancelled); Rick Ross; Playboi Carti; Lil Pump; Not3s; Mist; Ski Mask the Slump God; 67; Trippie Redd (Cancelled); Smokepurpp; Jaykae; Lisa Mercedez; Suspect

=== 2019 ===
The Wireless Festival was held on 5–7 July at Finsbury Park. The lineup was announced on 28 January, with Cardi B and Migos to co-headline on Friday, Travis Scott headlining on Saturday, and ASAP Rocky headlining on Sunday. On 9 February, Cadet, who was meant to be performing on Saturday, died. Wireless kept his performance set, in order to remember him. On 13 March, One Acen, Lotto Boyzz, THEY., Tiwa Savage, Lady Sanity and Lil Yachty were added to the lineup. In April, Loski pulled out due to legal issues. On 8 May, Yungen was added to the lineup. On 14 June Megan Thee Stallion was added to the lineup. On 20 June, it was announced that a number of acts would be streamed globally, live in virtual reality, by using a platform provided by MelodyVR. Streamed content would also be available via Wireless's Facebook page and MelodyVR's Android and iOS VR/360 apps. On 1 July, Polo G was added to the lineup. Two days later, Headie One and Lil Uzi Vert pulled out for unknown reasons. Jay1 replaced One and a surprise guest, Skepta, replaced Vert. Also, ASAP Rocky pulled out, due to legal issues. On the day before he was meant to headline, J Hus was added to the lineup and it was also announced that Rae Sremmurd would be headlining Sunday. At the same time, Polo G cancelled his performance, due to the birth of his child, and was replaced by Aitch.

**Line Up**
Friday	Saturday	Sunday
**Cardi B** / **Migos**; Tory Lanez; Ella Mai; Tyga; Fredo; Lil Skies; Bugzy Malone; Headie One (Cancelled); JAY1; IAMDDB; Maleek Berry; NSG; B Young; One Acen	**Travis Scott**; Future; Lil Uzi Vert (Cancelled); Skepta (Unannounced); Young Thug; Juice Wrld; Stefflon Don; Trippie Redd; Sheck Wes; Yungen; Lotto Boyzz; M Huncho; Saweetie; THEY. Unknown T Steel Banglez; Cadet; DigDat; Deno Driz	**ASAP Rocky** (Cancelled); **Rae Sremmurd**; J Hus; AJ Tracey; Lil Baby; Gunna; Not3s; Rich the Kid; Ski Mask the Slump God; Lil Yachty; Denzel Curry; D-Block Europe; Loski (Cancelled); J.I.D; Polo G (Cancelled); Aitch; Russ; Megan Thee Stallion; Tiwa Savage; Flohio; Lady Sanity

=== 2020 ===
The sixteenth edition of Wireless Festival was due to take place on 3–5 July 2020 at Finsbury Park, London. In social media statements posted on 23 March 2021, it was announced that the festival would be moved to Crystal Palace Park and would take place on 10–12 September 2021.

**Cancelled Line Up**
Friday	Saturday	Sunday
**ASAP Rocky**; D-Block Europe; Lil Uzi Vert; Young Thug; Playboi Carti; Trippie Redd; M Huncho; ASAP Ferg; Lil Tjay; Pop Smoke (Cancelled); Polo G Rico Nasty; Iann Dior	**Skepta**; Quality Control; DaBaby; Roddy Ricch; Burna Boy; Mostack; Aitch; Tion Wayne; Jay1; Doja Cat; Hardy Caprio; Koffee; Young T & Bugsey; Digdat; K-Trap; Kida Kudz; Tiffany Calver & Friends	**Meek Mill**; AJ Tracey; Lil Baby; A Boogie; Nav; Ski Mask the Slump God; Mist; Lil Tecca; City Girls; NLE Choppa; Nafe Smallz; Tyla Yaweh; Earthgang; Darkoo

=== 2021 ===
In social media statements posted on 23 March 2021, it was announced that the festival would be moved to Crystal Palace Park and would take place at a later date than usual, due to COVID, on 10–12 September 2021.

**Line Up**
Friday	Saturday	Sunday
**Future with a surprise appearance from Drake**; D-Block Europe; Digga D Giggs; Gunna; Ivorian Doll; Lil Uzi Vert; M1llionz; M24; MoStack; NSG; SL; Tiffany Calver (& Friends); Unknown T Young T & Bugsey	**Skepta**; AJ Tracey; ArrDee; Blanco; Central Cee; Darkoo; Fredo; Hardy Caprio; Jay1; Meek Mill; S1mba; Steel Banglez (Featuring Sidhu Moosewala); Swae Lee; Swarmz; Tion Wayne; Zie Zie	**Migos**; Abra Cadabra; Central Cee; Charlie Sloth (& Friends); Dappy; Digdat; Headie One; K-Trap; M Huncho; M24; Megan Thee Stallion; Mist; Nafe Smallz; Nafe Smallz; Potter Payper; Poundz; Rick Ross; Young Thug; Yungen

=== 2022 ===
On 25 February 2022, it was announced that Wireless Festival would take place in Crystal Palace Park on 1–3 July, while a second and third festival would be held in Finsbury Park and the National Exhibition Centre in Birmingham, both on 8–10 July. Seven headliners would be split between the three locations: Chris Brown, A$AP Rocky, J. Cole, Tyler, the Creator, Dave, Cardi B, Nicki Minaj, and SZA.

**Crystal Palace Park Line-Up**
Friday	Saturday	Sunday
A$AP Rocky; **Chris Brown**; The Kid Laroi; Lil Uzi Vert; Don Toliver; Trippie Redd; Ski Mask the Slump God; Fivio Foreign; Sleepy Hallow; BIA; Rico Nasty; Nardo Wick; Snoochie Shy; Kenny Allstar	**J. Cole**; Doja Cat; Playboi Carti; Gunna; Ari Lennox; Potter Payper; NorthSideBenji; Flo Milli; Ms Banks; Bas; Lancey Foux; French the Kid; Tiffany Calver; Swarzy	**Tyler, The Creator**; Roddy Ricch; Baby Keem; Kali Uchis; Little Simz; Snoh Aalegra; Ghetts; AG Club; Miraa May; Bakar; Knucks; Sainte; BERWYN; Skiifall; Snoochie Shy; Kenny Allstar

**Finsbury Park Line-Up**
Friday	Saturday	Sunday
**Cardi B** Roddy Ricch; Megan Thee Stallion; Burna Boy; Giveon; Mahalia; Arrdee; Omah Lay; Rema; B Young; Enny; BackRoad Gee; Ayra Starr; DJ Cuppy; Sian Anderson	**SZA**; Summer Walker; Jack Harlow; 6lack Blxst; Jhene Aiko; Lucky Daye; Queen Naija; Yung Bleu; Ace; Nadia Jade	**Nicki Minaj**; Lil Baby; Lil Durk; Polo G Lil Tjay; City Girls; Fireboy DML; Skillibeng; Shenseea; Unknown T A1 x J1; J.I the Prince of N.Y; BabyFace Ray; Seani B Tiffany Calver

**Outdoor at NEC Line-Up**
Friday	Saturday	Sunday
**Dave**; Summer Walker; Gunna; Little Simz; Popcaan; Blxst; Fireboy DML; Skillibeng; Shenseea; Unknown T DJ Target; DJ EDU	**Cardi B** Lil Baby; Burna Boy; Central Cee; Mahalia; Lil Tjay; City Girls; Arrdee; B Young; Remi Burgz; Jeremiah Asiamah	**J. Cole**; Roddy Ricch; D-Block Europe; Jack Harlow; Polo G Moneybagg Yo; Digga D Potter Payper; Knucks; Enny; Sainte; BackRoad Gee; French the Kid; DJ Target; Sir Spyro

=== 2023 ===
It was announced that Wireless 2023 would be returning for one weekend, at Finsbury Park. The event took place on 7, 8 and 9 July, with headline artists Playboi Carti, Travis Scott and D-Block Europe, and 50 Cent as a special guest, all UK festival exclusives. Saturday day tickets sold out within 60 minutes of going on sale.

**Line Up**
Friday	Saturday	Sunday
**Playboi Carti**; Lil Uzi Vert (Cancelled); Metro Boomin; Lancey Foux; Ice Spice; Yeat; Latto; Ken Carson; Destroy Lonely; Lola Brooke; Kenny Allstar; Remi Burgz	**Travis Scott**; Lil Yachty; Headie One; Bryson Tiller; FLO; Joey Bada$$ Lucki; Mariah The Scientist; Clavish; Tiffany Calver; Nadia Jae	**D-Block Europe** / **50 Cent** (Special Guest); Lil Durk (Cancelled); Popcaan; Lil Tjay; K-Trap; Dexta Daps; Glorilla; Black Sherif; Dreya Mac; DJ Target; Seani B

=== 2024 ===
It was announced that Wireless would return to Finsbury Park between 12 and 14 July 2024, with headline artists Nicki Minaj, 21 Savage, J Hus and Doja Cat.

**Line Up**
Friday	Saturday	Sunday
**Nicki Minaj**; Future; Destroy Lonely; Ice Spice; Sean Paul; Vanessa Bling; Veeze; Ragz Originale; DJ Target; Remi Burgz; Homixide Gang; Kairo Keyz	**21 Savage**; **J Hus**; Asake; Gunna; Sexyy Red (Cancelled); Fridayy; Skillibeng; Byron Messia; Shallipopi; Strandz; Kenny Allstar; Seani B	**Doja Cat**; Don Toliver; Rema; Tyla (Cancelled); Digga D (Cancelled); Uncle Waffles; Ruger; Teezo Touchdown; Nadia Jae; Snoochie Shy

=== 2025 ===
It was announced that Wireless would take place at Finsbury Park from 11–13 July 2025. On 16 February 2025, Drake was announced as the headlining act for all three nights of the event, which commemorated the 20th anniversary of the festival. The rest of the lineup was announced on 8 July, less than a week before the start of the festival, leading to some discontent among fans. Drake's three headlining shows included many guest appearances, including those from Lauryn Hill, 21 Savage, Vanessa Carlton, Central Cee, Dave, Burna Boy and Vybz Kartel. Drake's Sunday appearance was originally billed as two different performances at 18:25 and 20:55, but the first performance was removed from the schedule during the day. Drake eventually started his performance after Burna Boy finished, but was only able to perform a rushed medley of songs before curfew restrictions forced him to end after 40 minutes.

**Line Up**
Friday	Saturday	Sunday
Main Stage **Drake**; Lauryn Hill (Unannounced); PartyNextDoor; Bryson Tiller (Unannounced); Giveon (Unannounced); Mario (Unannounced); Bobby Valentino (Unannounced); Summer Walker (Special Guest); Leon Thomas; Kwn; Odeal; DJ AG Old Spice Stage; Roy Woods; Karri; Sailorr; Nippa; Kamilla Rose	Main Stage **Drake**; Vanessa Carlton (Unannounced); 21 Savage (Unannounced); Sexyy Red (Unannounced); Latto (Unannounced); PartyNextDoor (Unannounced); Central Cee (Unannounced); Dave (Unannounced); Skepta (Unannounced); J Hus (Unannounced); K-Trap (Unannounced); Headie One (Unannounced); Fakemink (Unannounced); Yeat (Unannounced); Boy Better Know; BigXthaPlug; Lancey Foux; Nemzzz; SahBabii; DJ AG Old Spice Stage; Fimiguerrero; Len; Chy Cartier; YT; Kenny Allstar Hennessy Stage; DJ Sugar B Sir Corey DJ; Rampage; DJ Supa D Twin B	Main Stage **Drake**; Burna Boy (Special Guest); Vybz Kartel (Special Guest); Rema (Unannounced); Popcaan; Central Cee (Unannounced); Spice; Masicka; DJ AG Old Spice Stage; Uncle Waffles; Darkoo; Odumodublvck; Skeete; Izzy Bossy

=== 2026 ===
On 30 March 2026, Wireless announced that Kanye West would be the headlining artist for all three nights of the 2026 festival, marking West's first UK performance since headlining Glastonbury in 2015. The selection drew criticism from the Jewish Leadership Council and London mayor Sadiq Khan due to West's history of antisemitic remarks. On 5 April, PepsiCo announced that they were withdrawing sponsorship for the event, citing West's antisemitic comments. The same day, UK prime minister Keir Starmer stated it was "deeply concerning" that West was booked to perform at the festival. On 6 April, other sponsors withdrew support for Wireless, including PayPal, while the UK government confirmed a review of West's right to enter the UK, with several members of parliament in opposition to West's appearance.

Melvin Benn, managing director of Wireless' organisers Festival Republic, defended West's planned appearance. Benn argued West's antisemitic remarks were comparable to behaviour he encountered in other individuals with mental illness, attributed it to West's bipolar disorder, and stated West considers his previous behaviour "abhorrent". Benn, who lived on a kibbutz in the 1970s, urged others to "reflect on their instant comments of disgust at the likelihood of [West] performing (as was mine) and offer some forgiveness and hope to him as I have decided to do". On 7 April, the Home Office denied West's Electronic Travel Authorisation application (which was initially approved) to travel to the UK, stating, "[West's] presence would not be conducive to the public good".

With West barred from entering, and the loss of sponsors, the organisers subsequently cancelled the festival and announced ticket refunds, also stating, "As with every Wireless Festival, multiple stakeholders were consulted in advance of booking [West] and no concerns were highlighted at the time", with Benn later claiming PepsiCo "signed off and approved" West's appearance.

Later, Festival Republic shared a statement by West, where he wrote, "My only goal is to come to London and present a show of change, bringing unity, peace, and love through my music. I would be grateful for the opportunity to meet with members of the Jewish community in the UK in person, to listen. I know words aren't enough – I'll have to show change through my actions. If you're open, I'm here". The organisers have declined to comment if the Festival will return in 2027.

== Sponsors ==
Years	Name of Sponsor	Organised by	Notes	Location	Date	Years
2005–08	O2	Live Nation & Festival Republic	as O2 Wireless Festival	Hyde Park, London Harewood House	5–7 July	2005–19
2009–12	Barclaycard	Live Nation & Festival Republic	as Barclaycard Wireless	Hyde Park, London Harewood House	5–7 July	2005–19
2013–14	Yahoo!	Live Nation & Festival Republic		Olympic Park (2013) Perry Park (2014)	5–7 July	2005–19
2015–2020	Pepsi Max	Live Nation & Festival Republic	Official partners	Finsbury Park	5–7 July	2005–19
2015–2020	Pepsi	Live Nation & Festival Republic	Official partners	Crystal Palace Park	July	2021–2023
2021–2023	Gopuff	Live Nation & Festival Republic	Official sponsors	Finsbury Park	July	2021–2023
2024–2025	Rockstar Energy	Live Nation & Festival Republic	Official sponsors	Finsbury Park	12–14 July	2024–2025
2026–present	Pepsi (withdrew)	Live Nation & Festival Republic	Pepsi withdrew their sponsorship following the criticism of Kanye West as headliner.	Finsbury Park	10–12 July	2026

== See also ==
- List of music festivals in the United Kingdom
