= Castanets (band) =

Musical project of Raymond Raposa

- Origin: San Diego, California, U.S.
- Genres: Psychedelic folk, alternative country
- Years active: 2002–2022
- Label: Asthmatic Kitty
- Past members: Raymond Raposa
- Website: asthmatickitty.com/artists/castanets/

Castanets was the musical project of Ray Raposa, who had been signed to Asthmatic Kitty Records from 2004 until his death in 2022. Castanets was influenced by country, folk, and experimental rock, and released seven albums, the latest being Decimation Blues in 2014. Additionally, songs by Castanets appear on a number of split 7-inch singles and EPs with other bands, including Shapes and Sizes and Dirty Projectors. While Raposa was the only constant member of the band, his records and live performances featured a rotating cast of musicians. A San Diego native, Raposa lived in Brooklyn and resided in Portland, Oregon.

== Biography ==
Raymond Byron Magic Raposa (January 22, 1981 – July 30, 2022) was an American singer, songwriter, and musician. He was born in Michigan City, Indiana, but his family moved to San Diego when he was two years old, and he grew up in the Mission Beach area. When he was thirteen, Raposa and his mother moved to Baja California, where he was home-schooled for a year. He left school at fifteen and traveled around North America and St. Croix, doing odd jobs, including working as a surf instructor for some time. In his late teens, Raposa became involved in the free-jazz project Womb. Womb recorded a self-titled album in 2001, which was released in 2004. In 2003, he appeared on the Liz Janes live EP Liz Janes and the Three Hour Choir.

While performing with others, Raposa had begun to develop his own musical projects. Together with Nathan Delffs, he recorded a number of CD-Rs, including What Kind of Cure (2002). While on tour with the band Howard Hello, Raposa began working with Liz Janes, who was already signed to Asthmatic Kitty at the time. What Kind of Cure was forwarded to Sufjan Stevens, who signed Raposa to the label. Instead of re-recording What Kind of Cure, Raposa instead decided to record new material for what became Cathedral, which appeared in October 2004. It was followed by an instrumental split 12-inch with the duo I Heart Lung. In the same year, Raposa moved to Brooklyn with Stevens to pursue music together. There, he took a job working in a record store.

In October 2005, the band released First Light's Freeze, which was largely constructed by Raposa, with the help of Stevens and engineer Rafter Roberts. In 2007, he released In the Vines, which Pitchfork described as indie folk.

Released in 2007, City of Refuge was recorded in the desert town of Overton, Nevada. Raposa had planned to record the whole record in Overton, but failing equipment forced him to make a temporary return to San Diego, where he and Roberts completed the album, with contributions by Jason Crane, Pall Jenkins, Andy Robillard, and DM Stith. Before beginning the recording of Texas Rose, the Thaw, and the Beasts, Raposa left New York and moved to Portland. He toured Europe in support of those releases. He estimated in 2008 that Castanets was about to kick off its tenth European tour.

Raposa's touring band has included Annie Clark (aka St. Vincent), Matthew Houck of Phosphorescent, singer-songwriters Jana Hunter and Red Hunter (aka Peter and the Wolf), and John McCauley of Deer Tick. He has toured with The Black Heart Procession, Deer Tick, Dirty Projectors, Michael Gira, Jana Hunter, Scout Niblett, Phosphorescent, Miles Benjamin Anthony Robinson, and others.

The most recent record by Castanets, Decimation Blues, was released in 2014 by the Asthmatic Kitty label.

On July 29, 2022, Raposa died at the age of 41 of undisclosed causes. Sufjan Stevens posted a tribute to the late artist on his Tumblr account. “Raymond Raposa passed away yesterday,” Stevens wrote. “He was a bright star, a good friend, and a great musician. It was always such a joy and a fierce spiritual journey to work with him. Heavy hearts and deep sorrows over here. Ray, may your soul glimmer brightly on the other side! And may perpetual light shine upon you. I love you.”

== Style ==
Castanets was one of the more prominent bands in the so-called American freak folk movement (also known as psychedelic folk and New Weird America) of the early 2000s. In 2008, Raposa told Paste that "Freak-folk wasn't as cohesive a scene as it was made out to be. A lot of people [to whom the label is ascribed] are friends, but there wasn't any grand unifying focus or anything. [...] I always got mad when people were calling my friends freaks anyway, [but] I think the more magazines I open with my friends in them, the better. In an airport bookstore, not a police blotter."

On performing live, Raposa noted that "I guess [the songs' sound] kind of depends on the mood that I'm in as far as how many people I want to bring out, or the way that I feel about presenting certain things at certain times kind of dictates who is playing and how many of them."

== Name ==
The name of the band does not refer to Raposa's Hispanic heritage; instead, he insisted that it was "a complete accident. And a complete mistake". The band had a tour with Howard Hello and Lazarus booked and What Kind of Cure had appeared on CD-R, while a name had not been decided upon. According to Raposa, "I think that...possibly...[Nathan Delffs'] mom might have suggested it".

== Side projects ==
In 2011, Raposa collaborated with Sufjan Stevens to score Kaleo La Belle's documentary Beyond This Place. The duo performed the songs live during a screening of the film on four occasions in October 2011. The title track featured Vesper. Stevens and Raposa also soundtracked La Belle's 2017 film Fell in Love with a Girl.

In September 2012, Raposa, under the name Raymond Byron and the White Freighter, released Little Death Shaker via Asthmatic Kitty. Little Death Shaker explores similar themes to those taken up on previous Castanets albums and features new collaborators, as well as some who appeared on earlier works.

The Castanets song "You are the Blood" is featured in the end titles of the video game Hotline Miami 2.

Sufjan Stevens' cover of "You are the Blood" appeared on the first disc of the 2009 double-CD compilation Dark Was the Night; it was reinterpreted in a remix by Canadian DJ Buck 65 and American rapper Serengeti on disc two. The compilation benefited the Red Hot Organization, an international charity dedicated to raising funds and awareness for HIV/AIDS.

== Discography ==
Albums

- Cathedral (2004, Asthmatic Kitty)
- First Light's Freeze (2005, Asthmatic Kitty)
- In the Vines (2007, Asthmatic Kitty)
- City of Refuge (2008, Asthmatic Kitty)
- Texas Rose, the Thaw, and the Beasts (2009, Asthmatic Kitty)
- Little Death Shaker (credited to Raymond Byron and the White Freighter) (2012, Asthmatic Kitty)
- Decimation Blues (2014, Asthmatic Kitty)
- Bond Wire Cur (credited to Castanets and Raymond Byron) (2022, ESP-DISK)

EPs

- Self-titled 12-inch (with I Heart Lung) (2005, Sounds Are Active)
- Unusual Animals, Vol. 2 10-inch (with Dirty Projectors) (2006, Asthmatic Kitty)
- Tour EP (with Shapes and Sizes) (2007, Asthmatic Kitty)

Singles

- Insound 7-inch Box Series, Vol. 4 (with Wooden Wand) (2006, Insound)
- "Strong Animal" 7-inch (2008, Asthmatic Kitty)
- "I'm No Stranger to the Rain" 7-inch (2012, Wool Recordings)
