= First Light's Freeze =

Studio album by Castanets
- Released: October 11, 2005
- Genre: Psychedelic folk
- Length: 33:25
- Label: Asthmatic Kitty

Castanets chronology
Cathedral (2004)	First Light's Freeze (2005)	In The Vines (2007)

Professional ratings
Review scores
Source	Rating
Allmusic	4/5 stars
Pitchfork Media	(7.7/10)
Popmatters	(7/10)
Tiny Mix Tapes	(3.5/5)
Prefix Magazine	(5/10)

First Light's Freeze is an album by Castanets, released on October 11, 2005. Ray Raposa described the recording of the album as 'on some the interludes between tracks we had like seven people on them so that is half of the credits right there. But most of the tracks are Rafter [Roberts], Sufjan [Stevens] and I doing lots of overdubs'. The album features contributions by Chris Schlarb and Daniel Carter.

== Critical acclaim ==
Brian Howe from pitchforkmedia.com described the album as ' stringing together disembodied fragments of gothic Americana with brief, freaky interludes', while Heather Pares finds the themes of 'war and friendship' expressed through 'sparkling nighttime laments'. David Bernard in popmatters.com found the album 'consistently captivating' while 'many tracks hum with electronics and crawl along at a codeine pace'. Grigsby of tinymixtapes.com praised Raposa's writing as '[his] strength might lie in melancholy pop songs, and at that, he might be peerless'. Matthew Ozga of prefixmag was less impressed calling the album 'a real snooze musically' while characterising Raposa as a 'relentless obscurantist'. In December 2005, American webzine Somewhere Cold ranked First Light's Freeze No. 7 on their 2005 Somewhere Cold Awards Hall of Fame list.

== Track listing ==
All tracks are written by Raymond Raposa.

No.	Title	Length
1.	"(The Waves Are Rolling Beneath Your Skin)"	0:28
2.	"Into the Night"	4:04
3.	"Song Is Not the Song of the World"	3:56
4.	"Good Friend, Yr Hunger"	2:03
5.	"(We Drew Uncertain Breath)"	0:28
6.	"Bells Aloud"	4:50
7.	"First Light's Freeze"	2:16
8.	"Evidence (A Mask of Horizon, Distortion of Form)"	0:55
9.	"No Voice Was Raised"	5:17
10.	"(Migration Concentric)"	0:31
11.	"All That I Know to Have Changed in You"	3:53
12.	"Dancing with Someone (Privilege of Everything)"	3:00
13.	"Reflecting in the Angles"	1:45

== Personnel ==
As with the previous release Cathedral, contributors as simply listed as 'performers' without indicating their specific role.

- Bridgit DeCook
- Chris Schlarb
- Daniel Carter
- G. Lucas Crane
- Gabriel Sundy
- Heidi Diehl
- Justice Constantine
- Nathan Delffs
- Nathan Hubbard
- Orlando Greenhill
- Rafter Roberts
- Raymond Raposa
- Sayard Egan
- Jarvis Taveniere
- Sufjan Stevens

The album was mixed and mastered by Ero Thomson and Rafter Roberts.
