= Decimation Blues =

Studio album by Castanets
- Released: August 19, 2014
- Genre: Indie folk
- Length: 35:09
- Label: Asthmatic Kitty

Castanets chronology
Texas Rose, the Thaw, and the Beasts (2009)	Decimation Blues (2014)

Decimation Blues is the sixth and final studio album by American folk band Castanets. It was released on August 19, 2014, through Asthmatic Kitty. It would be the last release before their disbandment in 2022 due to lead singer Raymond Raposa's death.

== Reception ==
Professional ratings
Aggregate scores
Source	Rating
Metacritic	68/100
Review scores
Source	Rating
The 405	6.5/10
AllMusic	3.5/5 stars
Consequence of Sound	B−
musicOMH	4/5 stars
Pitchfork	5.9/10
PopMatters	5/10 stars
Tiny Mix Tapes	3.5/5 stars

Decimation Blues received mixed to positive reviews from critics. On Metacritic, the album holds a score of 68/100 based on 9 reviews.

== Track list ==
(All songs by Raymond Raposa)

No.	Title	Length
1.	"It's Good to Touch You in the Sunlight"	4:18
2.	"Be My Eyes"	2:59
3.	"Thunder Bay"	3:54
4.	"Out for the West"	4:14
5.	"To Look Over the Grounds"	2:45
6.	"Blackbird Tune"	2:11
7.	"Cub"	3:19
8.	"Pour It Tall and Pour It True"	3:04
9.	"There Is a Place Up the Road There"	0:52
10.	"My Girl Comes to the City"	2:02
11.	"Tell Them Memphis"	3:37
12.	"Somewhere in the Blue"	1:54
