= Cathedral (Castanets album) =

Studio album by Castanets
- Released: October 19, 2004
- Genre: Psychedelic folk; Americana; indie rock
- Length: 33:26
- Label: Asthmatic Kitty

Castanets chronology
Cathedral (2004)	First Light's Freeze (2005)

Cathedral is an album by Castanets, released on October 19, 2004 through Asthmatic Kitty. Part of the album was recorded live and includes a dozen local musicians. Led by Raymond Raposa, this is the band's first foray into studio recording, which he described as 'a really protracted, uncomfortable process'. The release features guest-vocals by Brigit DeCook and Liz Janes. The material was partly recorded in a remote cabin in Northern California. Raposa had planned to publish a novel to accompany the album, which failed to surface.

== Critical reception ==
Professional ratings
Review scores
Source	Rating
AllMusic	4/5 stars
Pitchfork	8.5/10
PopMatters	Favorable
No Ripcord	9/10

Amanda Petrusich of Pitchfork.com compared Raposa's writing on Cathedral to that of the poet Seamus Heaney. She described the album as a collection of 'deep gothic ballads' of 'country music [that] should sound like death, and more specifically, death-by-murky-submersion'. Heather Phares of allmusic.com referred to the religious overtones of the album, describing it as 'spiritual searching' and as having 'a certain dark theatricality'. Justin Cober-Lake at popmatters.com described Cathedral as having 'lo-fi production [which] helps develop the darkness of Castanets’ music. [It] sounds as if it was recorded in the desert at night, which suits the pre-technology fears of the album'. Jon Pit from Dusted Magazine called it 'another welcome installment in the folk renaissance' although he described Raposa's vocals as 'lacklustre'. In December 2004, American webzine Somewhere Cold ranked Cathedral No. 8 on their 2004 Somewhere Cold Awards Hall of Fame list.

In 2005, Stylus Magazine's Andrew Gaerig reflected that Cathedral "was Americana in the most literal sense. Though certainly not without precedent, Cathedral owed no major debt to Americana’s touchstones: blues, country, and folk". He further named it "a finding-America story that shedded wide-eyed mythology in favor of swampy hymns and boisterous noise workouts. Cathedral had all of the dressings of a straight-from-the-womb, fully formed indie rock classic—shrugging off considerable baggage, sidestepping genre pigeonholes—but the album’s relentless heavy heart was a downer, and it didn’t help that Raposa's scratchy folk whisper had trouble teasing the melody out of his compositions."

== Track listing ==
All tracks are written by Raymond Raposa.

No.	Title	Length
1.	"Cathedral 2 (Your Feet On The Floor Sounding Like The Rain)"	3:13
2.	"Just To Break Free From A Hundred Families"	0:34
3.	"Industry And Snow"	1:44
4.	"You Are The Blood"	4:09
5.	"No Light To Be Found (Fare Thee Faith, The Path Is Yours)"	6:30
6.	"Three Days, Four Nights"	4:51
7.	"As You Do"	2:54
8.	"Cathedral 3 (Make Us New)"	0:31
9.	"The Smallest Bones"	2:47
10.	"We Are The Wreckage"	3:56
11.	"Cathedral 4 (The Unbreaking Branch And Song)"	2:23

== Personnel ==
The album lists individuals as performers and cryptic descriptions of their parts, these include:

- Mia Ferm
- Nathan Hubbard
- Nicholas Delffs
- Nathan Delffs
- Nicholas Hennies
- Connor Kirkwood
- Daniel Bryant
- Pall Jenkins
- Christopher Cory
- Gabriel Sundy
- Josh Quon
- Sean Jerd
- Raymond Raposa
- Brigit DeCook
- Elizabeth Janes
- Rafter Roberts
