= Tiffany Calver =

British radio DJ

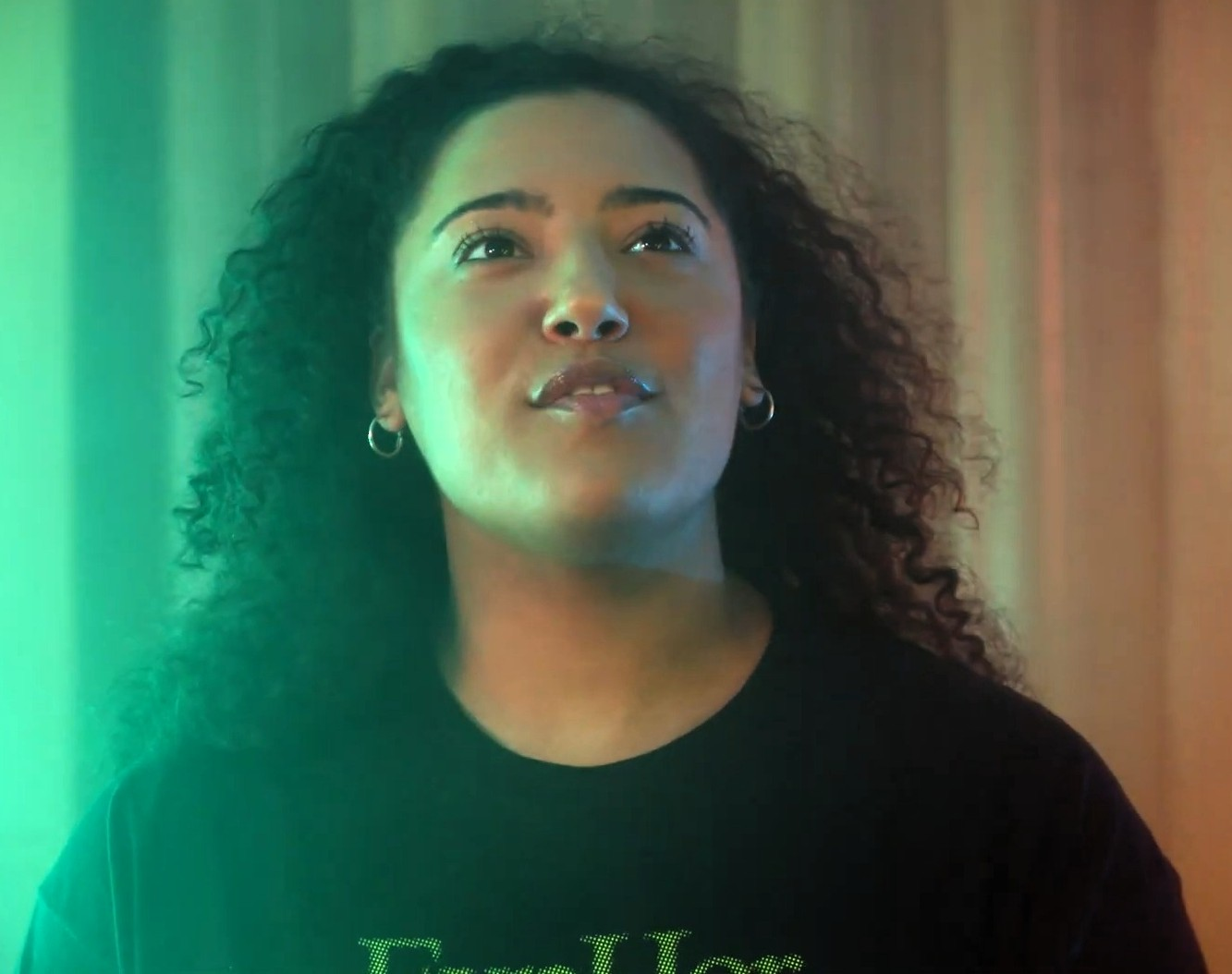
- Calver in 2019
- Born: Tiffany Anais Calver; 16 September 1994 (age 31); Telford, Shropshire, England
- Occupations: DJ, radio presenter
- Employer: BBC

Tiffany Anais Calver (born 16 September 1994) is a British radio DJ and presenter.

== Early life ==
Calver was born and bred in Telford, but moved to London at the age of 17 in order to attend college and be closer to the music scene in the city. Calver studied Media at the City of Westminster College. While studying, Calver blogged for MTV and SB.TV. She subsequently interned at a management company, which gave her access to numerous events. It was at this time that Calver began DJing.

== Career ==
Calver previously worked at Kiss FM. She started at BBC Radio 1Xtra in January 2019, replacing Charlie Sloth, becoming the first woman to host the prestigious Rap Show. Her Rap Show on 1Xtra was awarded "Best Radio Show" by British magazine DJMag.

In March 2023, Calver announced she would be leaving 1Xtra's Rap Show and would be moving to the station's Friday night slot from 9-11pm. That show kick-started on 9 June 2023. In November 2025, Calver confirmed that she would leave 1Xtra after 7 years on the station, with her final show broadcast on 19 December 2025.
