= DJ AG =

British DJ and livestreamer

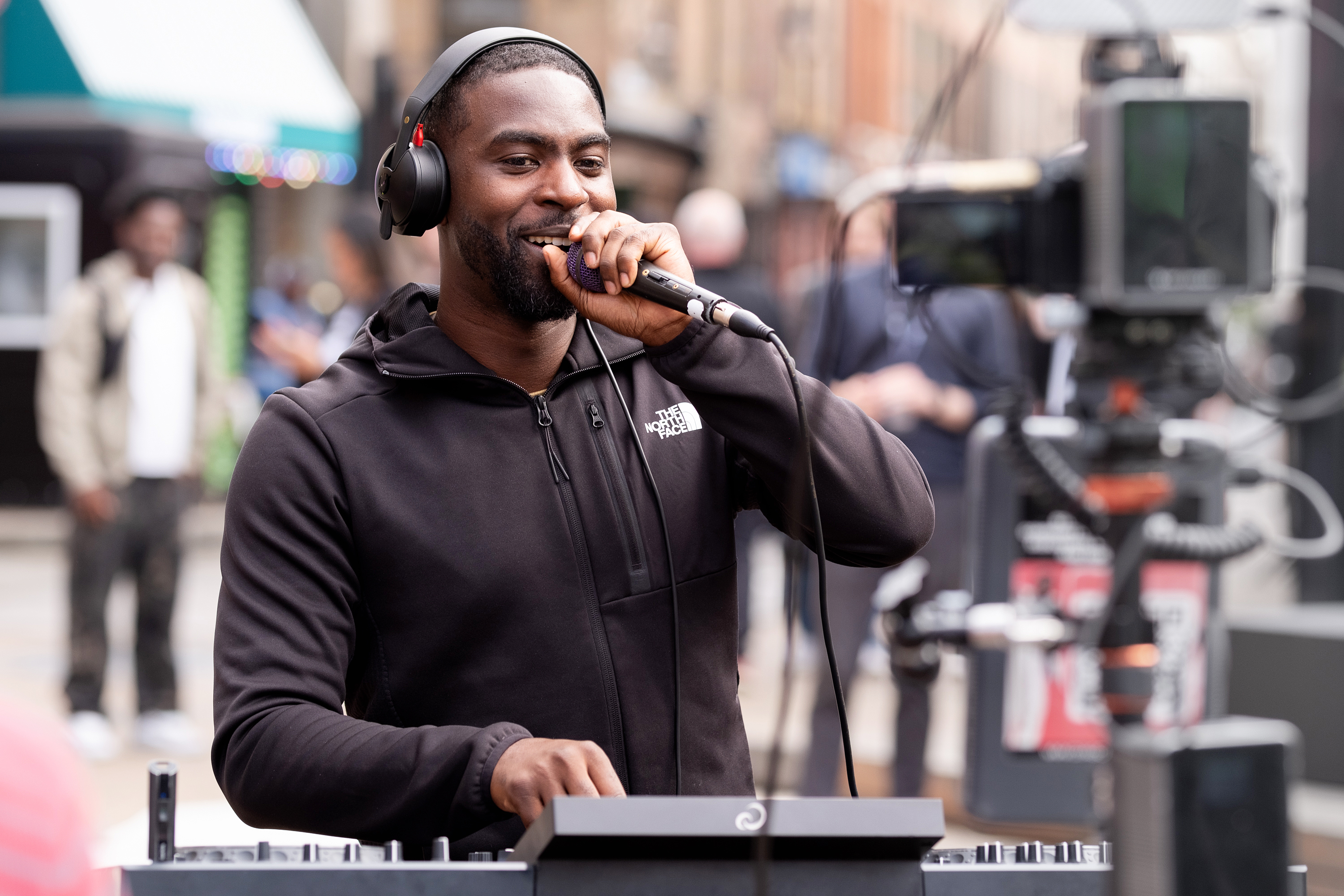
- DJ AG at SXSW London 2026
- Born: Ashley Gordon; 1985; Tottenham, London, England
- Occupations: DJ, online streamer
- Years active: 2023–present

TikTok information
- Page: @djagonline
- Followers: 1.7 million

Ashley Gordon (born 1985), known professionally as DJ AG, is a British DJ and online streamer. He is recognised for outdoor open-format DJ sets across London that are broadcast live on social media platforms. His live streams have featured appearances from artists including Skepta, Will Smith, Ciara and Beenie Man.

== Early life ==
Gordon grew up in Tottenham, north London, to a family of Jamaican heritage, and was raised by his single mother alongside his brother and sister. He attended St Paul's and All Hallows infant and junior school, alongside Jme, before attending Aylward secondary school in Edmonton alongside Bloodline Crew's Big H and Bossman Birdie.

Many of his early jobs were in the hospitality industry, and he briefly worked as a primary school teacher, having studied teaching at Middlesex University; he was working as a sales manager before leaving the role to pursue DJing and online streaming full-time.

== Personal life ==
Gordon is divorced and a father of two.

== Career ==
From the age of 16, Gordon was an amateur MC in the grime scene, going by the stage name Untitled. He was a part of a crew called Infamous Killers alongside Black the Ripper, and appeared as an MC on Heat FM alongside Chip's Shoddy Crew; he later appeared regularly on the Enfield internet radio station Axe FM, where he would clash other artists, and released several mixtapes, beginning with his debut mixtape Misconceptions in 2008. He later formed the crew Behave Yourself alongside Messy, Evolver and Rogue, released the 2009 mixtape Mind Warp and the four-part 2010 EP series Try Me, and left Axe FM due to a belief that emerging streaming services such as Ustream would be a better tool for promoting his music for free.

Gordon began online streaming as a DJ in 2022 and shifted to outdoor DJ sets in 2023, performing in public locations around London including squares, car parks, and housing estates. The sets often attract large crowds of passers-by and are broadcast online to audiences on TikTok.

== Recognition ==
In 2024, Gordon was named Time Out Londoner of the Year for his contribution to the city’s cultural life. In 2025, he received the UK Entertainment Award for Best Social Impact.
