= Peter and the Wolf (band) =

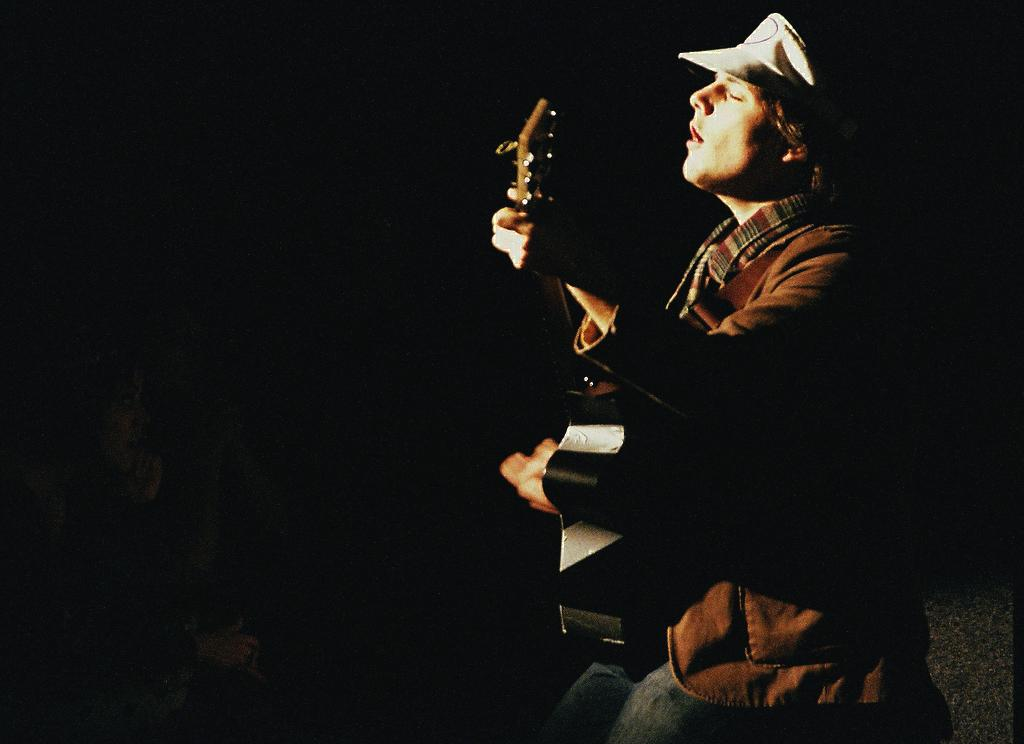
- Red Hunter in 2008

Background information
- Origin: Austin, TX
- Genres: Folk, lo-fi, alt-country
- Labels: Whiskey & Apples

Peter and the Wolf is the American folk band formed by musician Redding Hunter. Hunter says about his song writing, "I carry a journal everywhere with me. I will stop in the middle of whatever I'm doing to write down an idea, whether it's something I think about, hear, observe, or whatever. It's my highest priority to make sure I capture these ideas, as the craft of songwriting is a lifelong pursuit". The band's record label offers early demos called Peter and the Wolf and Experiments in Junk, but the first official CD released was Lightness. After the release of Lightness the band performed several shows in graveyards, islands, as well as more regular venues. The Ivori Palms became the act's second official release in September 2007, followed by Mellow Owl and Traffique's Endless Weekend Mixtape, the newest album, Easy Mountain, was released in December, 2011.

Mellow Owl was written and recorded on a farm in Canada, and an undisclosed location in Vermont, according to liner notes. As Red Hunter told Splice Today in a recent interview, "I'm trying out all kinds of new stuff here to see what works. I'm really influenced by these native dudes I met in Fiji who sang super mellow beach harmonies, so I guess it'll be some island jams."

== Discography ==
=== Peter & the Wolf (s/t demo cd) (June 2006) ===
1. "Couches By The Sea"
2. "People of The Night"
3. "Strange Eyes"
4. "The Fall"
5. "The Apple Tree"
6. "Dear Old Robyn"
7. "Red Sun"
8. "The Owl"
9. "How I wish"
10. "Silent Movies"
11. "That Old Mystery"
12. "What Happened Up There..."

=== Lightness (October 31, 2006) ===
1. "Midnight Train"
2. "The Ivy"
3. "Safe Travels"
4. "My Grey Overcoat"
5. "The Highway"
6. "The Owl"
7. "Anna Maria"
8. "The Bonsai Tree"
9. "The Apple Tree"
10. "Canada"
11. "Dear Old Robyn"
12. "Captain Dan"
13. "Black Saltwater"
14. "Holy Water"
15. "Silent Movies"
16. "Lightness"

=== The Ivori Palms (September 2007) ===
1. "Where Summer Goes"
2. "Scarlet and Grey"
3. "Check Out the River"
4. "Ghost Sandals" (live)
5. "Waiting for a Train"
6. "Southern Moon"
7. "The Bike of Jonas"
8. "The Ivori Palms"
9. "A Hundred Days"
10. "The Lighthouse"
11. "Better Days"
12. "The Beggar's Waltz"
13. "The Traveler and the County Boys"
14. "Sparks" (live)

=== Fireflies ===
1. "Timeflies"
2. "Fireflies"
3. "A Race Around The Earth"
4. "Images"
5. "Balloon Voyage"
6. "Island Rose"
7. "Henry D."
8. "Palace in the Sun"
9. "Spanish Absinthe"
10. "The Wind"

=== Experiments in Junk ===
1. "Strange Machines" 2:49
2. "Anna Maria" - Live on KVRX 2:02
3. "Paint the Town" 2:17
4. "Alexander and Diogenes" 4:45
5. "Snake Charmer" 1:42
6. "Brother" - Live on KVRX 2:50
7. "Miss Caroline" 2:04
8. "Chinatown" 3:15
9. "Fata Morgana" 4:53
10. "The Window" 1:54
11. "Black Saltwater" 1:34
12. "Electrical Tape" 1:46
13. "Interview" Live on KVRX 7:04
14. "Jaywalkin" 0:44
15. "Sayonara Suckers" 1:17
16. "Mad Love" 3:01
17. "To Kill a Moose" 0:29

=== Mellow Owl (November 14, 2008) ===
1. "Supermellofied" 2:49
2. "Moondance of the Nightowl" 4:00
3. "The Ballad of Redhook" 2:24
4. "Fireflies" 3:16
5. "Bottle Rockettes" 3:40
6. "Dime Novel Afterhours" 3:48
7. "Trainhopper" 2:39
8. "Citybirds" 2:36
9. "Fiji Boy Part VII" 2:45
10. "A Different Idea of Home" 3:06
11. "This Kid I Knew" 3:34
12. "The Bride of S. Travels" 3:09

=== Traffique's Endless Weekend Mixtape (2010) ===
1. "Get Weird" 3:40
2. "Nora" 3:25
3. "La Cobra Madre" 3:27
4. "Bright and Blue" 3:40
5. "Homage Arthur (Almost Free)" 3:30
6. "Wonderdrug" 3:59
7. "Keep Joshtin Weird" 1:41
8. "New Shooz" 4:24
9. "Koala" 3:56

=== Easy Mountain (2011) ===
1. "Rosarito"
2. "My Weirdest Dreams"
3. "Sure I See The Sun"
4. "Hazy Lions"
5. "Swandive"
6. "The Bright Lights"
7. "Earth To Dave"
8. "Lightfalls"
9. "Hooray For Us"
10. "The Sunglasses Song"
11. "Silver Sand"
12. "Mellofied Live"
