= List of Gogglebox episodes =

Gogglebox is a television review programme that was narrated by Caroline Aherne until April 2016 and Craig Cash after that. It features recurring British couples, families and friends sitting in their living rooms watching and commenting on various television series. This is a list of all broadcast episodes. All dates are the first broadcast on Channel 4 in the United Kingdom. There was a "Brexit Special" episode of Gogglebox on 3 August 2016 and on 10 September 2021, an all black cast of Celebrity Gogglebox was featured as part of a “Black To Front” day, in which the aim was to amplify black talent, voices and stories, as part of Channel 4's "ongoing commitment to improve Black representation on- and off-screen". On 11 March 2023, there was a special 90 minute episode, to celebrate the 10 year anniversary of the show, with many previous stars returning for the occasion.

A junior version of the show, called Gogglesprogs, launched with a Christmas Special on Christmas Day 2015, and was followed by six other episodes which began airing from 17 June 2016 until 22 July 2016. On 30 May 2017, another spin-off series titled Vlogglebox was announced. It aired on E4 and featured reactions from 16 to 24-year-olds watching online content on their smartphones, laptops or tablets. In 2019, a celebrity version of Gogglebox was ordered, which returned in 2020 for a second series, a third series in 2021, a fourth in 2022, a fifth in 2023, a sixth in 2024 and a seventh series in 2025.

== Series overview ==
Series	Episodes	Originally released	
Series	Episodes	First released	Last released
1	4	7 March 2013	28 March 2013
2	13	25 September 2013	18 December 2013
3	12	7 March 2014	23 May 2014
4	12	26 September 2014	19 December 2014
5	12	20 February 2015	8 May 2015
6	15	11 September 2015	18 December 2015
7	17	19 February 2016	10 June 2016
Gogglesprogs 1	6	17 June 2016	22 July 2016
8	12	23 September 2016	16 December 2016
9	15	24 February 2017	2 June 2017
Gogglesprogs 2	6	9 June 2017	14 July 2017
Vlogglebox	6	18 June 2017	23 July 2017
10	15	8 September 2017	24 December 2017
11	16	23 February 2018	18 June 2018
12	15	7 September 2018	21 December 2018
13	15	22 February 2019	31 May 2019
Celebrity 1	6	14 June 2019	19 July 2019
14	15	13 September 2019	3 January 2020
15	15	21 February 2020	29 May 2020
Celebrity 2	7	5 June 2020	17 July 2020
16	15	11 September 2020	8 January 2021
17	14	26 February 2021	6 August 2021
Celebrity 3	9	4 June 2021	10 September 2021
18	14	17 September 2021	2 January 2022
19	16	18 February 2022	3 June 2022
Celebrity 4	6	10 June 2022	15 July 2022
20	15	9 September 2022	2 January 2023
21	16	24 February 2023	9 June 2023
Celebrity 5	6	16 June 2023	21 July 2023
22	16	8 September 2023	1 January 2024
23	15	16 February 2024	24 May 2024
Celebrity 6	6	7 June 2024	12 July 2024
24	16	13 September 2024	1 January 2025
25	15	14 February 2025	23 May 2025
Celebrity 7	7	6 June 2025	11 July 2025
26	17	5 September 2025	1 January 2026
27	16	6 February 2026	22 May 2026
Celebrity 8	7	5 June 2026	17 July 2026
28	16	4 September 2026	TBA

== Episodes ==
=== Series 1 (2013) ===
No. overall	Episode	Original release date	UK viewers (millions)
1	Episode 1	7 March 2013	N/A
Programmes included: Meteor Strike: Fireballs from Space, BBC News on Queen Elizabeth II's admission to hospital, Embarrassing Bodies, Top Gear, 16 Kids and Counting, Bank of Dave: Fighting the Fat Cats, One Born Every Minute, and Food Glorious Food.
2	Episode 2	14 March 2013	N/A
Programmes included: Ant & Dec's Saturday Night Takeaway, ITV News on Justin Bieber's London paparazzi attack, Call the Midwife, Crufts 2013: Best in Show, Toughest Place to be a Taxi Driver, Countryfile: A Royal Appointment, BBC News on Chris Huhne and Vicky Pryce sentencing, Oscar Pistorius: What Really Happened?, Supersize vs Superskinny and A Very British Wedding.
3	Episode 3	21 March 2013	1.21
Programmes included: Red Nose Day 2013, Antiques Roadshow, The Body Shocking Show, Paul Hollywood: Bread, University Challenge, Our Queen and Coronation Street.
4	Episode 4	28 March 2013	1.26
Programmes included: MasterChef, Ancient Egypt – Life and Death in the Valley of the Kings, BBC News on Boris Berezovsky's death, The Cube, BBC News report on immigration, Keeping Britain Alive: The NHS in a Day, Pompeii: The Mystery of the Frozen People in Time, and Boris Johnson: The Irresistible Rise.

=== Series 2 (2013) ===
No. overall	Episode	Original release date	UK viewers (millions)
5	Episode 1	25 September 2013	1.71
Programmes included: The X Factor, BBC News on Godfrey Bloom's removal from UKIP, The Three Day Nanny, BBC News report on an NHS staff face veils review, Jamie's Money Saving Meals, A Political Broadcast by the Liberal Democrats, The Great British Bake Off and Downton Abbey.
6	Episode 2	2 October 2013	1.68
Programmes included: Strictly Come Dancing, Kevin McCloud's Man Made Home, My Tattoo Addiction, BBC News on Labour's energy prices policy, The Midwives, The Fried Chicken Shop, The Face, Downton Abbey and The Andrew Marr Show.
7	Episode 3	9 October 2013	1.93
Programmes included: QI, ITV News on The Mail on Sunday Ed Miliband controversy, Sex Box, The X Factor, BBC News report on the Conservative Party manifesto, Masters of Sex, Gino's Italian Escape, BBC News on Prince Harry's official Australia visit and Homeland.
8	Episode 4	16 October 2013	2.12
Programmes included: Trust Me, I'm a Doctor, BBC News on the 2014 Commonwealth Games Baton Relay, Celebrity Wedding Planner, Stephen Fry: Out There, Dogs: Their Secret Lives, The X Factor, Medieval Lives: Births, Marriage, Death, Mastermind, BBC News on Cyclone Phailin and Made in Chelsea.
9	Episode 5	23 October 2013	2.31
Programmes included: Alan Carr: Chatty Man, BBC News on the Queens Birthday Honours list, Natural World – Walrus: Two Tonne Tusker, Up All Night: The Nightclub Toilet, ITV News on Boris Johnson's trade visit to China, The One and Only Cilla Black, The X Factor and Coronation Street.
10	Episode 6	30 October 2013	2.13
Programmes included: No Sex Please, We're Japanese, BBC News on the christening of Prince George, Nigellissima, My Crazy New Jamaican Life, Educating Yorkshire, Newsnight interview with Russell Brand, BBC News on the St. Jude storm and The X Factor.
11	Episode 7	6 November 2013	2.43
Programmes included: Release the Hounds, ITV News on Paul Gambaccini's arrest, Richard Hammond Builds a Planet, The Woman with 40 Cats... and Other Pet Hoarders, BBC News on the News of the World phone hacking trial, 999: What's Your Emergency?, Iceland Foods: Life in the Freezer Cabinet, A Political Broadcast by the Labour Party and The X Factor.
12	Episode 8	13 November 2013	2.47
Programmes included: Shaun Ryder on UFOs, BBC News report on 'plus size' mannequins, Bouncers, Match of the Day, Question Time, Newsflash – Stories That Stopped the World, The X Factor, John Lewis Christmas advert and BBC News on Remembrance Sunday.
13	Episode 9	20 November 2013	2.00
Programmes included: Britain on the Fiddle, BBC News on Princess Anne's pro horse meat comments, Agatha Christie's Poirot, BBC News on the Death of Gareth Williams, Children in Need 2013, The X Factor Results, Fear of Flying: Caught on Camera and Seven Days That Made the Fuhrer.
14	Episode 10	27 November 2013	2.11
Programmes included: I'm a Celebrity... Get Me Out of Here!, BBC News on the 2013-14 Ashes series, Mystery Map, Doctor Who, BBC News on Kingston upon Hull being named UK City of Culture 2017, Countdown, The X Factor Results, Blackfish, George Clarke's Amazing Spaces, Compare the Market advert with Gary Barlow and Star Wars Episode VI: Return of the Jedi.
15	Episode 11	4 December 2013	2.16
Programmes included: I'm a Celebrity... Get Me Out of Here!, BBC News report on immigration policies, Kangaroo Dundee, A Great British Christmas with Sarah Beeny, Harry Potter and the Philosopher's Stone, 1066: The Last Battlefield – A Time Team Special, ITV News on Prince William performing with Jon Bon Jovi and Taylor Swift and The X Factor.
16	Episode 12	11 December 2013	2.68
Programmes included: ITV News on the death of Nelson Mandela, I'm a Celebrity... Get Me Out of Here!, Match of the Day, Robbie Williams: One Night at the Palladium, Question Time, Stephen Hawking: A Brief History of Mine, ITV News on the 2014 FIFA World Cup groupings and Home Alone.
17	Episode 13	18 December 2013	2.99
Programmes included: The X Factor, Channel 4 News on Nelson Mandela's memorial service, Tom Kerridge Cooks Christmas, ITV News on Prince Harry's South Pole expedition, There's Something About Susan and Kirstie's Crafty Christmas.

=== Series 3 (2014) ===
No. overall	Episode	Original release date	UK viewers (millions)
18	Episode 1	7 March 2014	3.50
Programmes included: Dragons' Den, ITV News report on the 86th Academy Awards, ITV News on the Crimea crisis, Mary Berry Cooks, Mind the Gap: London vs the Rest, The Cube, Match of the Day, BBC News on the UKIP party conference and Grease.
19	Episode 2	14 March 2014	3.48
Programmes included: Top Gear, Paralympic Winter Games: Highlights, Dancing on Ice, ITV Weather, ITV News on Labour's job guarantee scheme, ITV News on the Prince Harry and Cressida Bonas romance, The Great British Sewing Bee, BBC News on the missing Malaysia Airlines Flight and Titanic.
20	Episode 3	21 March 2014	3.16
Programmes included: One Born Every Minute, Newsnight, Davina: Beyond Breaking Point for Sport Relief, Educating Joey Essex, ITV News on Malaysia Airlines Flight 370, The Voice UK, BBC News on Tony Benn's death and Live from Space: Lap of the Planet.
21	Episode 4	28 March 2014	3.75
Programmes included: Sport Relief 2014, Dead Famous DNA, Sunday Politics, Aliens, Secrets of Bones, BBC News report on migrant stowaways and Man v. Food.
22	Episode 5	4 April 2014	3.89
Programmes included: The Michael McIntyre Chat Show, Student Nurses: Bedpans and Bandages, Storage Hunters, Nigel Farage: Who Are You?, ITV News on same-sex marriage legislation in the UK, University Challenge, ITV News on the Hillsborough disaster hearing and The Voice UK.
23	Episode 6	11 April 2014	3.33
Programmes included: The Grand National, ITV News on the trial of Oscar Pistorius, Ghost, Fifteen to One, Antiques Roadshow, BBC News on Bruce Forsyth stepping down from Strictly Come Dancing and Ant & Dec's Saturday Night Takeaway.
24	Episode 7	18 April 2014	3.90
Programmes included: Britain's Got Talent, ITV News on the Duke and Duchess of Cambridge's official visit to Australia, ITV News on the 2014 Scottish independence referendum, Embarrassing Bodies: Live from the Clinic, Africa's Giant Killers, The Guess List, Dogging Tales and The Cube.
25	Episode 8	25 April 2014	4.10
Programmes included: Britain's Got Talent, ITV News report on the Labour Party, Mastermind, BBC News on the sacking of David Moyes as manager of Manchester United, The Graduate, Food Unwrapped, The Man with the 10-Stone Testicles, BBC News on UKIP's general election campaign and The Big Allotment Challenge.
26	Episode 9	2 May 2014	4.04
Programmes included: Alan Carr: Chatty Man, BBC News on the canonisation of Pope John Paul II and Pope John XXIII, Heston's Great British Food, A Party Political Broadcast by the Liberal Democrats, ITV News on the Max Clifford verdict, BBC News on new mortgage rules, Britain's Got Talent, Ejector Seat and Love For Sale with Rupert Everett.
27	Episode 10	9 May 2014	4.14
Programmes included: Britain's Got Talent, ITV News on the Jeremy Clarkson racism scandal, Natural World: Nature's Misfits, A Party Political Broadcast by the Conservative Party, Oprah Prime, BBC News on the obesity crisis, 24: Live Another Day, The Island with Bear Grylls, The Andrew Marr Show and When Corden Met Barlow.
28	Episode 11	16 May 2014	3.73
Programmes included: Eurovision Song Contest 2014, ITV News on a Solange Knowles fight with Jay-Z, The Island with Bear Grylls, ITV News on the increase of house prices, American Pie, BBC News on the Take That tax avoidance scandal, Alan Carr: Chatty Man, ITV News on the England World Cup squad selection and Britain's Got Talent.
29	Episode 12	23 May 2014	4.39
Programmes included: Mastermind, BBC News on the Richard Scudamore sexism scandal, Man Vs Weird, ITV News on the 2014 European Parliament election, The Full Monty, A Political Broadcast by the Labour Party, Britain's Got Talent, Newsnight interview with Silvio Berlusconi and The 2014 British Academy Television Awards.

=== Series 4 (2014) ===
No. overall	Episode	Original release date	UK viewers (millions)
30	Episode 1	26 September 2014	3.97
Programmes included: The X Factor, BBC News on the 2014 Scottish referendum outcome, Ramsay's Costa Del Nightmares, ITV News on Tesco overstating profits, Mrs. Doubtfire, Through the Keyhole, Downton Abbey, ITV News on Gordon Brown's Scottish devolution pledge and The Men With Many Wives.
31	Episode 2	3 October 2014	3.89
Programmes included: Strictly Come Dancing, BBC News on the House of Commons vote in favour of Operation Shader, 24 Hours in Police Custody, ITV News on George Clooney's wedding, The X Factor, ITV News on Mark Reckless defection to UKIP and the resignation of Brooks Newmark, 102 Minutes That Changed America and Newsnight interview with David Cameron.
32	Episode 3	10 October 2014	4.40
Programmes included: Strictly Come Dancing, BBC News report on alcohol, The X Factor, Unreported World, BBC News on the Alan Henning beheading, Match of the Day 2, Gino's Italian Escape, BBC News report on Nick Clegg, Obsessive Compulsive Cleaners and Downton Abbey.
–	Celebrity Special for SU2C	17 October 2014	N/A
Programmes included: The X Factor, Downton Abbey, Strictly Come Dancing, University Challenge and more.
33	Episode 4	24 October 2014	N/A
Programmes included: The X Factor, BBC News on the trial of Oscar Pistorius outcome, Life Story, ITV News on new trolling laws, You Can't Get The Staff, Newsnight interview with Winston McKenzie, Secrets of the Living Dolls, BBC News on 5 British men accused of planned Islamic State attack and Jurassic Park.
34	Episode 5	31 October 2014	4.50
Programmes included: Antiques Roadshow, ITV News on the Queen's first tweet, Countdown, 24 Hours in A&E, ITV News on Robbie Williams's wife labour video, The X Factor, BBC News on Cameron's EU bill refusal, The Apprentice and Spider House.
35	Episode 6	7 November 2014	4.65
Programmes included: The X Factor Results, BBC News report on alcohol, Great Continental Railway Journeys, Educating Joey Essex, ITV News on the VSS Enterprise crash, Strictly Come Dancing, Miracle Babies, Dad's Army, BBC News on Nik Wallenda's tightrope between two Chicago skyscrapers and Downton Abbey.
36	Episode 7	14 November 2014	4.16
Programmes included: The X Factor, BBC News on a man faking to be in a coma, John Lewis Christmas advert, ITV News on Ed Miliband's CBI speech, Life Story, BBC News on Remembrance Sunday, Only Connect, The Missing and Buying Naked.
37	Episode 8	21 November 2014	4.00
Programmes included: I'm a Celebrity... Get Me Out of Here!, BBC News on financial crisis warning, Speed with Guy Martin, The X Factor Results, Band Aid 30, ITV News on a big cat spotted in Paris, Life Story, Sainsbury's Christmas advert, Psycho and The X Factor.
38	Episode 9	28 November 2014	4.06
Programmes included: The X Factor, Posh People: Inside Tatler, Ben Fogle: New Lives in the Wild, ITV News on UKIP's by-election victory, Remember Me, ITV News on Emily Thornberry's resignation, Antiques Roadshow and I'm a Celebrity... Get Me Out of Here!.
39	Episode 10	5 December 2014	3.91
Programmes included: The X Factor, ITV News on Black Friday, The British Property Boom, ITV News on The Interview alleged cyber attack, Taken, ITV News on Britain's road investment, The Apprentice and I'm a Celebrity... Get Me Out of Here!.
40	Episode 11	12 December 2014	4.56
Programmes included: The X Factor, ITV News on Cardiff sky swing crash, Jamie's Cracking Christmas, ITV News on Nigel Farage breastfeeding comments, Home Alone 2: Lost in New York, The Royal Variety Performance, BBC News on the Shrien Dewani verdict and I'm a Celebrity... Get Me Out of Here!.
41	Episode 12	19 December 2014	4.13
Programmes included: The X Factor, BBC News on Prince George photos, Casino Royale, Catchphrase, The Missing, BBC News on the 2014 Sydney hostage crisis, Nigellissima and The Perfect Morecambe & Wise Christmas Special.

=== Series 5 (2015) ===
No. overall	Episode	Original release date	UK viewers (millions)
42	Episode 1	20 February 2015	5.23
Programmes included: Jamie & Jimmy's Friday Night Feast, ITV News on Mars One, The Gift, UKIP: The First 100 Days, BBC News on Obama healthcare plan, Wolf Hall, BBC News on the 2015 Copenhagen shootings and Basic Instinct.
43	Episode 2	27 February 2015	4.96
Programmes included: EastEnders, BBC News on Austin Mitchell Grimsby comments, Childbirth: All or Nothing, Ant & Dec's Saturday Night Takeaway, Four Rooms, Match of the Day, ITV News on the 87th Academy Awards and Wolf Hall.
44	Episode 3	6 March 2015	5.15
Programmes included: The Voice UK, ITV News on the assassination of Boris Nemtsov, Bear Grylls: Mission Survive, 24 Hours in A&E, The Big Painting Challenge, Drugs Live: Cannabis on Trial, BBC News on 'the dress' and Banished.
45	Episode 4	13 March 2015	4.31
Programmes included: Ant & Dec's Saturday Night Takeaway, ITV News on Jeremy Clarkson's suspension from the BBC, Poldark, BBC News on the general election, MasterChef, Crufts: Best in Show, First Dates, BBC News on Harrison Ford plane crash and Gladiator.
46	Episode 5	20 March 2015	5.06
Programmes included: You're Back in the Room, BBC News on Dolce & Gabbana boycott calls, The Jonathan Ross Show, Neighbours, University Challenge, ITV News on the Labour campaign, The Big Painting Challenge and Red Nose Day 2015.
47	Episode 6	27 March 2015	4.82
Programmes included: Antiques Roadshow, BBC News on David Cameron announcing he will not run for a third term in office, The Royals, Natural World: Growing Up Wild, Poldark, ITV News on the April 2015 lunar eclipse, The Mafia with Trevor McDonald, ITV News on the reburial of Richard III of England and Cape Fear.
48	Episode 7	3 April 2015	4.64
Programmes included: Ant & Dec's Saturday Night Takeaway, A Party Political Broadcast by the Labour Party, The Ark, ITV News on the revival of Thunderbirds, First Dates, One Born Every Minute, A Party Political Broadcast by the UK Independence Party and Mastermind.
49	Episode 8	10 April 2015	4.74
Programmes included: Eurovision Song Contest's Greatest Hits, ITV News coverage of the 2015 general election, Collectaholics, A Party Political Broadcast by Plaid Cymru, Ant & Dec's Saturday Night Takeaway, Mad Men, Louis Theroux: Transgender Kids and Skyfall.
50	Episode 9	17 April 2015	4.98
Programmes included: The Grand National, Britain's Got Talent, University Challenge, 2,000 Tattoos: 40 Piercings and a Pickled Ear, A Party Political Broadcast by the Scottish National Party, ITV News report on dust pollution in the UK from the Sahara desert, A Party Political Broadcast by the Conservative Party and Game of Thrones.
51	Episode 10	24 April 2015	4.77
Programmes included: Antiques Roadshow, A Party Political Broadcast by the Liberal Democrats, MasterChef, Indiana Jones and the Temple of Doom, Would I Lie to You?, A Party Political Broadcast by the Trade Unionist and Socialist Coalition, BBC News on the Star Wars reboot and Britain's Got Talent.
52	Episode 11	1 May 2015	4.66
Programmes included: First Dates, ITV News on the Conservative campaign, Britain's Got Talent, The Island with Bear Grylls, Inside No. 9, A Party Political Broadcast by the Green Party, MasterChef and Unreported World: Forty Years to Find My Family.
53	Episode 12	8 May 2015	5.08
Programmes included: Britain's Got Talent, BBC News report on UK life expectancy, Antiques Roadshow, Game of Thrones, Question Time, The Stranger on the Bridge and ITV News on the Labour campaign.

=== Series 6 (2015) ===
No. overall	Episode	Original release date	UK viewers (millions)
54	Episode 1	11 September 2015	5.44
Programmes included: The X Factor, ITV News on the Syrian refugee crisis, Stephen Fry in Central America, First Dates, The Great British Bake Off, Time Crashers, Antiques Roadshow and Lady Chatterley's Lover.
55	Episode 2	18 September 2015	4.28
Programmes included: First Dates, ITV News on David Cameron's Yorkshire comments, The X Factor, Doctor Foster, Britain's Biggest Adventures with Bear Grylls, BBC News on Jeremy Corbyn elected as the new Labour leader, This Is England '90 and Last Night at The Proms.
56	Episode 3	25 September 2015	4.54
Programmes included: Downton Abbey, Newsnight on David Cameron Piggate, Countdown to Life: The Extraordinary Making of You, Singing in the Rainforest, Antiques Roadshow, Inside the Ku Klux Klan, BBC News report on bridge as a sport debate and The Woman in Black.
57	Episode 4	2 October 2015	4.76
Programmes included: The X Factor, BBC News on Corbyn's first speech as Labour leader, Doctor Foster, BBC News on a supermoon, Strictly Come Dancing, BBC News on the 2015 Rugby World Cup, Sex Diaries: Webcam Couples, Release the Hounds and First Dates.
58	Celebrity Special for SU2C	9 October 2015	5.29
Programmes included: Patagonia: Earth's Secret Paradise, ITV News on new 5p plastic bag charge, Strictly Come Dancing, Doctor Foster, Eternal Glory, Pauline's Story: Stand Up to Cancer, Saturday Night Football Live: Chelsea vs. Southampton and Ruby's Story: Stand Up to Cancer.
59	Episode 6	16 October 2015	5.87
Programmes included: Strictly Come Dancing, BBC News on North Korea's 70th Party Foundation Day celebrations, DIY SOS: Home for Veterans, River, Patagonia: Earth's Secret Paradise, ITV News on the EU referendum campaigns, Experimental and Bridget Jones's Diary.
60	Episode 7	23 October 2015	5.33
Programmes included: Downton Abbey, BBC News on Spacebit Mission One, Great Continental Railway Journeys, Gift of Life, First Dates, BBC News on Oscar Pistorius's release from prison under house arrest, Eternal Glory, ITV News on sugar tax proposals and Dirty Dancing.
61	Episode 8	30 October 2015	5.33
Programmes included: Strictly Come Dancing, BBC News on TalkTalk cyber attack, Release the Hounds, Modern Times: The Last Dukes, Jekyll and Hyde, BBC News on tax credit vote, TFI Friday and 24 Hours in A&E.
62	Episode 9	6 November 2015	5.55
Programmes included: The Hunt, The Great Pottery Throw Down, BBC News on the 2015 Kogalymavia plane crash, University Challenge, SAS: Who Dares Wins, BBC News on the Whip/Nae Nae being used in a police altercation, 24 Hours in A&E and Antiques Roadshow.
63	Episode 10	13 November 2015	4.81
Programmes included: The Hunt, BBC News report on a mock Tudor castle, Strictly Come Dancing, ITV News on Remembrance Sunday, The X Factor, ITV News on the Russian doping scandal, Gino's Italian Escape: Islands in the Sun and Billy Elliot.
64	Episode 11	20 November 2015	4.70
Programmes included: The X Factor Results, BBC News on the November 2015 Paris attacks, Colour: The Spectrum of Science, I'm a Celebrity... Get Me Out of Here!, Simply Nigella, The Hunt, BBC Weather and First Dates.
65	Episode 12	27 November 2015	4.24
Programmes included: Adele at the BBC, ITV News on the Lord's Prayer advert ban, Ireland with Simon Reeve, BBC News on the aftermath of the Paris attacks, The Great Pottery Throw Down, The Supervet, Doctor in the House and The Last Kingdom.
66	Episode 13	4 December 2015	4.39
Programmes included: Alan Carr: Chatty Man, BBC News on the fight against Islamic State, I'm a Celebrity... Get Me Out of Here!, The Murder Detectives, BBC News on Princess Charlotte photographs, The Hunt, The Supervet and Braveheart.
67	Episode 14	11 December 2015	5.24
Programmes included: Turner Prize 2015, ITV News on Lenny Henry's knighthood, The Royal Variety Performance 2015, The Secret Life of 6 Year Olds, Meet the Psychopaths, BBC News on the Carlisle floods, I'm a Celebrity... Get Me Out of Here! and Single White Female.
68	Episode 15	18 December 2015	4.89
Programmes included: First Dates: The Proposal, BBC News on Star Wars: The Force Awakens premiere, Luther, How the Monarchy Can Make You Millions: Channel 4 Dispatches, The X Factor Final Results, The World's Most Expensive Christmas, ITV News on Tim Peake's mission to space and Love Actually.
–	Gogglesprogs Christmas Special 2015	25 December 2015	3.96
Programmes included: The Great British Bake Off, BBC News on the 2015 United Kingdom general election results, Countdown to Life: The Extraordinary Making Of You, Jurassic Park, Natural World: Growing Up Wild, Frozen, The Queen's Longest Reign: Elizabeth and Victoria and The Snowman.

=== Series 7 (2016) ===
No. overall	Episode	Original release date	UK viewers (millions)
69	Episode 1	19 February 2016	5.78
Programmes included: The Real Marigold Hotel, BBC News report on women earning less in the workplace, The Secret Life of the Zoo, Happy Valley, It's Not Rocket Science, The Supervet, ITV News on Russia accused of bombing civilians and First Dates.
70	Episode 2	26 February 2016	4.68
Programmes included: Ant & Dec's Saturday Night Takeaway, BBC News on the Brexit referendum date announcement, The Great British Sex Survey, The Prosecutors: Real Crime and Punishment, BBC News on Boris Johnson's backing of Brexit, Call the Midwife, BBC News on Mars chocolate safety scare and Natural World: The Mating Game.
71	Episode 3	4 March 2016	5.15
Programmes included: Dogs Might Fly, ITV News on the 88th Academy Awards, The Secret Life of the Zoo, BBC News report on emergency services training exercises, Do We Really Need the Moon?, Happy Valley, The Getaway Car and Amy.
72	Episode 4	11 March 2016	5.25
Programmes included: Take Me Out, BBC News on Volvo driverless cars, Tattoo Fixers, Doctor Thorne, Steve Backshall's Extreme Mountain Challenge, Dunblane: Our Story, ITV News on a royal skiing holiday and University Challenge.
73	Episode 5	18 March 2016	4.41
Programmes included: Crufts 2016, ITV News report on Trump rallies, Horizon: The Immortalist, Big, BBC News on Top Gear (2002 TV series), The Night Manager, BBC News on spending cuts warning and Dangerman: The Incredible Mr. Goodwin.
74	Episode 6	25 March 2016	4.98
Programmes included: Dogs Might Fly, ITV News on the resignation of Iain Duncan Smith, Employable Me, Doctor Thorne, Tribes, Predators & Me, Line of Duty, BBC News on war ship name being voted as Boaty McBoatface and Heston's Dinner in Space.
75	Episode 7	1 April 2016	5.02
Programmes included: Guy Martin's Wall of Death: Live, Channel 4 News on EgyptAir Flight 181 'selfie' with hijacker, Bake Off: Crème de la Crème, EastEnders, Bear Grylls: Mission Survive, Antiques Roadshow, This Farming Life and The Night Manager.
76	Episode 8	8 April 2016	4.70
Programmes included: Drive, ITV News on David Cameron offshore holdings scandal, Dogs Might Fly, Marcella, Sex Box, Mastermind, BBC News on UK Steel and Natural Born Winners. Note: Final episode to be narrated by Caroline Aherne.
77	Episode 9	15 April 2016	4.83
Programmes included: Britain's Got Talent, ITV News on Justin Welby's biological father, Millionaires Mansions: Designing Britain's Most Exclusive Homes, BBC News on the Panama papers scandal, Indian Summers, BBC News on a planned interstellar probe, Bake Off: Crème de la Crème and Die Hard.
78	Episode 10	22 April 2016	5.08
Programmes included: Britain's Got Talent, BBC News on 'occasional' food guidelines, Caravanner of the Year, Marcella, The Island with Bear Grylls, BBC News on Johnny Depp dog smuggling, Horizon: Should We Close Our Zoos?, The Fearless Chef and University Challenge.
79	Episode 11	29 April 2016	4.18
Programmes included: Flowers, ITV News on Prince's death, Antiques Roadshow, Channel 4 News on British Home Stores collapse, Fierce, Caravanner of the Year, BBC News on Obama's UK visit, Louis Theroux: Drinking to Oblivion and Horizon: How to Find Love Online.
80	Episode 12	6 May 2016	4.37
Programmes included: Britain's Got Talent, BBC News on Leicester City winning the Premier League, Natural World: Kangaroo Dundee and Other Animals, The Secret, Jaws, BBC News report on Royal Mail 'health risk' cat, Bake Off: Crème de la Crème, BBC News on Obama's correspondents' dinner speech and Paul Merton's Secret Stations.
81	Episode 13	13 May 2016	4.54
Programmes included: Britain's Got Talent, BBC News on the Brexit referendum, Attenborough's Passion Projects: A Blank On The Map, Alien, Sunday Brunch, Hillsborough, BBC News on Meghan Trainor digital altering video and MasterChef: The Final.
82	Episode 14	20 May 2016	4.56
Programmes included: Eurovision Song Contest 2016, BBC News on Boris Johnson's EU Hitler comparisons, The Queen's 90th Birthday Celebrations, Let's Do It: A Tribute to Victoria Wood, The Hollow Crown, Countdown, BBC News on term time father winning High Court case and 24 Hours in A&E.
83	Episode 15	27 May 2016	4.24
Programmes included: Britain's Got Talent, Big Fish Man, Peaky Blinders, The Great British Sewing Bee, BBC News on the Brexit referendum, Storm Troopers: The Fight to Forecast the Weather, ITV News on Angelina Jolie becoming a lecturer and Secret Life of the Human Pups.
84	Episode 16	3 June 2016	4.41
Programmes included: Britain's Got Talent Final, ITV News on José Mourinho becoming manager of Manchester United, Top Gear, Countryfile, Versailles, How to Get a Council House, 24 Hours in Police Custody, BBC News on Johnny Depp's alleged assault on his wife and Seventy with a Six Pack.
85	Episode 17	10 June 2016	3.86
Programmes included: Versailles, BBC News on a child found in the woods in Japan, Genius by Stephen Hawking, BBC News on Banksy's work in a primary school playground, Eating Well with Hemsley + Hemsley, Cameron and Farage: The EU Referendum, Inside Birmingham's Children Hospital and The Jungle Book.

=== Gogglesprogs Series 1 (2016) ===
No. overall	Episode	Original release date	UK viewers (millions)
1	Episode 1	17 June 2016	2.60
2	Episode 2	24 June 2016	1.90
3	Episode 3	1 July 2016	1.37
4	Episode 4	8 July 2016	1.62
5	Episode 5	15 July 2016	1.41
6	Episode 6	22 July 2016	1.39

=== Series 8 (2016) ===
No. overall	Episode	Original release date	UK viewers (millions)
86	Episode 1	23 September 2016	3.54
Programmes included: Victoria, ITV News report on a head transplant, Hunted, ITV News on Brad Pitt and Angelina Jolie split, Penelope Keith's Hidden Villages, Body Fixers, ITV News on Diane James being elected the new UKIP leader and The Great British Bake Off.
87	Episode 2	30 September 2016	3.64
Programmes included: Strictly Come Dancing, The Lie Detective, Victoria, BBC News on the 2016 US presidential election, National Treasure (British TV series), BBC News on Jeremy Corbyn being re-elected Labour leader, Celebrity Island with Bear Grylls, The X Factor and The Xtra Factor.
88	Episode 3	7 October 2016	3.84
Programmes included: The X Factor, ITV News on Theresa May's vows on Article 50, Strictly Come Dancing, First Dates, Poldark, Go for It, The Incredible Story of Marie Antoinette's Watch and Animal Babies.
89	Episode 4	14 October 2016	3.88
Programmes included: The X Factor, ITV News on the 2016 US presidential election, The Apprentice, ITV News on Steven Woolfe fight with fellow MEP, National Treasure, Celebrity Island with Bear Grylls, BBC News on the killer clown craze and Terminator 2: Judgment Day.
–	Celebrity Special for SU2C	21 October 2016	3.43
90	Episode 5	28 October 2016	4.12
Programmes included: Strictly Come Dancing, BBC News on Belfast bakery gay marriage scandal, The Young Pope, Meet the Parents, Poldark, BBC News on the United Nations making Wonder Woman an ambassador, Hunted and The Great British Bake Off.
91	Episode 6	4 November 2016	4.42
Programmes included: Bublé at the BBC, First Dates, The X Factor, A Nightmare on Elm Street, Peter York's Hipster Handbook, This Time Next Year, BBC News on elderly targeted emojis and Poldark.
92	Episode 7	11 November 2016	3.88
ITV News and BBC News on Donald Trump's US election victory, Strictly Come Dancing, BBC News report on Prince Harry's statement to the media, Planet Earth II, BBC News report on Brexit, Random Acts and Operation Gold Rush with Dan Snow.
93	Episode 8	18 November 2016	3.14
Programmes included: Strictly Come Dancing, ITV News report on a supermoon, I'm a Celebrity... Get Me Out of Here!, The Secret Life of the Zoo, ITV News on Nigel Farage's meeting with Donald Trump, Married at First Sight, The Royal British Legion Festival of Remembrance and The Next Great Magician.
94	Episode 9	25 November 2016	3.17
Programmes included: Who Do You Think You Are?, BBC News on Buckingham Palace refurbishment, Planet Earth II, Breaking the Silence Live, I'm a Celebrity... Get Me Out of Here!, ITV News on girl with cancer cryonic freezing request, The X Factor Results and The Grand Tour.
95	Episode 10	2 December 2016	3.20
Programmes included: Strictly Come Dancing, The Secret Life of the Zoo, First Dates, The X Factor, Rillington Place, Michael McIntyre's Big Show, 24 Hours in A&E and I'm a Celebrity... Get Me Out of Here!.
96	Episode 11	9 December 2016	4.05
Programmes included: BRITs Icon: Robbie Williams, Skeg Vegas, Tattoo Fixers, Planet Earth II, The Big Life Fix with Simon Reeve, Fawlty Towers and I'm a Celebrity... Get Me Out of Here!.
97	Episode 12	16 December 2016	3.75
Programmes included: Strictly Come Dancing, Planet Earth II, First Dates, Rillington Place, David Blaine: Beyond Magic, When Phillip Met Prince Philip and White Christmas.
–	Gogglesprogs Christmas Special 2016	24 December 2016	2.87

=== Series 9 (2017) ===
No. overall	Episode	Original release date	UK viewers (millions)
98	Episode 1	24 February 2017	3.73
Programmes included: SS-GB, BBC News on Wayne Shaw 'piegate' betting controversy, Jon Richardson: How to Survive the End of the World, Dragons' Den, Death in Paradise, The Jump, BBC News report on ketchup and Cruising with Jane McDonald.
99	Episode 2	3 March 2017	3.62
Programmes included: Little Big Shots, BBC News on Prince Charles backing the sterilisation of squirrels, The Nightly Show, Mary Berry Everyday, BBC News on the 89th Academy Awards wrong winner announcement, The Secret Life of the Zoo, The Secret Chef and Incredible Medicine: Dr. Weston's Carebook.
100	Episode 3	10 March 2017	3.23
Programmes included: 5 Gold Rings, Newsnight, Mastermind: Grand Final, The Voice UK, Top Gear, The Replacement, Channel 4 News on Banksy's opening of The Walled Off Hotel and Mutiny.
101	Episode 4	17 March 2017	3.79
Programmes included: Ant & Dec's Saturday Night Takeaway, BBC News on Robert Kelly's children interrupting interview, Down the Mighty River with Steve Backshall, Dogs Behaving Badly, The Great Pottery Throw Down, Schofield's South African Adventure, The Replacement and ITV News on Nicola Sturgeon proposing a second Scottish referendum.
102	Episode 5	24 March 2017	2.89
Programmes included: Star Wars: Episode V – The Empire Strikes Back, Three Wives, One Husband, The Voice UK, BBC News on the Trump-Russia investigation scandal, Rivers with Jeremy Paxman, Broadchurch, BBC News on George Osborne appointed as editor for the Evening Standard and Dame Vera Lynn: Happy 100th Birthday.
103	Episode 6	31 March 2017	3.55
Programmes included: Line of Duty, University Challenge, Red Nose Day 2017, Rio Ferdinand: Being Mum & Dad, One Night with My Ex, Broadchurch, BBC News on the new £1 coin and All Round to Mrs. Brown's.
104	Episode 7	7 April 2017	3.84
Programmes included: Kitchen 999: Emergency Chefs, BBC News report on a grammar vigilante, The Voice UK, Alone with the In-Laws, Line of Duty, Life Story, BBC News on Lexi Thompson losing the 2017 ANA Inspiration due to a TV viewer and One Born Every Minute.
105	Episode 8	14 April 2017	3.71
Programmes included: Ant & Dec's Saturday Night Takeaway, Mary Berry's Easter Feast, University Challenge, The Toilet: An Unspoken History, Big Little Lies, The Dog with an IQ of 102, Channel 4 News on the United Express Flight 3411 incident and Line of Duty.
106	Episode 9	21 April 2017	3.76
Programmes included: First Dates, BBC News on a snap election announcement, Britain's Got Talent, ITV News on Satellite Navigation being introduced in driving tests, Nature's Weirdest Events, Doctor Who, BBC News on Prince Harry opening up about mental health and Culinary Genius.
107	Episode 10	28 April 2017	3.66
Programmes included: Joanna Lumley's Postcards, BBC News on the 2017 United Kingdom local elections, Britain's Got Talent, BBC News on the London Marathon, BBC News on the 2017 French presidential election, Bigheads, Little Boy Blue, The Island with Bear Grylls and Line Of Duty.
108	Episode 11	5 May 2017	4.07
Programmes included: Antiques Roadshow, ITV News on Diane Abbott police figures stumble, The Island with Bear Grylls, BBC News on the 2017 United Kingdom local elections, Speed, E4's Tattoo Artist of the Year, Britain's Got Talent, BBC News report on Nightingale song birds being under threat and The Supervet.
109	Episode 12	12 May 2017	3.67
Programmes included: Britain's Got Talent, First Dates, A Party Election Broadcast by the Liberal Democrats, King Charles III, The One Show, Tonight at the London Palladium, Amazing Hotels: Life Beyond the Lobby and A Party Election Broadcast by the Conservative Party.
110	Episode 13	19 May 2017	3.70
Programmes included: Eurovision Song Contest 2017, A Election Broadcast by Plaid Cymru, The Island with Bear Grylls, Natural World: Nature's Miniature Miracles, Three Girls, A Party Election Broadcast by the Labour Party BBC News on the Dismissal of James Comey and Britain's Got Talent.
111	Episode 14	26 May 2017	3.65
Programmes included: Britain's Got Talent, Twin Peaks: The Return, A Party Election Broadcast by the UK Independence Party, ITV News on the Manchester Arena bombing, Mexico: Earth's Festival of Life, The Andrew Neil Interviews, First Dates and ITV News on Pippa Middleton's wedding.
112	Episode 15	2 June 2017	2.96
Programmes included: The Great British Skinny Dip, ITV News on Jeremy Corbyn's LBC interview, Paul Hollywood's Big Continental Road Trip, A Party Election Broadcast by the Scottish National Party, Your Face or Mine?, A Party Election Broadcast by Labour Party, The Andrew Neil Interviews and The Spy Who Loved Me.

=== Gogglesprogs Series 2 (2017) ===
No. overall	Episode	Original release date	UK viewers (millions)
7	Episode 1	9 June 2017	1.42
8	Episode 2	16 June 2017	1.34
9	Episode 3	23 June 2017	1.09
10	Episode 4	30 June 2017	1.17
11	Episode 5	7 July 2017	0.98
12	Episode 6	28 July 2017	1.14

=== Vlogglebox Series 1 (2017) ===
No. overall	Episode	Original release date	UK viewers (millions)
1	Episode 1	18 June 2017	N/A
2	Episode 2	25 June 2017	N/A
3	Episode 3	2 July 2017	N/A
4	Episode 4	9 July 2017	N/A
5	Episode 5	16 July 2017	N/A
6	Episode 6	23 July 2017	N/A

=== Series 10 (2017) ===
No. overall	Episode	Original release date	UK viewers (millions)
113	Episode 1	8 September 2017	3.38
Programmes included: The Great British Bake Off, ITV News on the panic buying over hoovers, Doctor Foster, The X Factor, The Crystal Maze, Mountain: Life at the Extreme, BBC News on North Korea testing atomic bombs and Cheap Cheap Cheap.
114	Episode 2	15 September 2017	3.27
Programmes included: 100 Year Old Driving School, Amazing Spaces: Shed of the Year, Fatal Attraction, Strictly Come Dancing, Dragons' Den, 999: On The Frontline, The Andrew Marr Show and Naked Attraction.
115	Episode 3	22 September 2017	3.19
Programmes included: Even Better Than the Real Thing, ITV News on May warning Johnson to stop 'backseat driving' over Brexit, The Great British Bake Off, The Crystal Maze, Doctor Foster, ITV News on Ryanair cancelling flights, First Dates and Bromans.
116	Episode 4	29 September 2017	3.50
Programmes included: Strictly Come Dancing, Antiques Roadshow, BBC News on North Korea bomb threats, Thelma & Louise, The Andrew Marr Show, Call the Cleaners, BBC News on Theresa May's Chequers plan and Doctor Foster.
117	Episode 5	6 October 2017	3.26
Programmes included: Strictly Come Dancing, James May: The Reassembler, Antiques Road Trip, The Andrew Marr Show, ITV News on Aldi and M&S 'chickengate', Escape and The Yorkshire Vet.
118	Episode 6	13 October 2017	3.53
Programmes included: Strictly Come Dancing, Celebrity Hunted, Britain Afloat, ITV News on the Harvey Weinstein sexual abuse cases, The Great British Bake Off, Liar, ITV News on 30 Tory MPs wanting May out of office and The X Factor.
119	Episode 7	20 October 2017	3.37
Programmes included: Strictly Come Dancing, The One Show, Britain by Bike with Larry and George Lamb, Liar, BBC News on an Anglerfish accidentally swallowing a fish, The X Factor, Gordon Ramsey on Cocaine and BBC News on a star collision.
120	Episode 8	27 October 2017	3.61
Programmes included: The X Factor, BBC News on Brexit deadlock, The Ganges with Sue Perkins, Your Song, Obsessive Compulsive Country House Cleaners, Strictly Come Dancing, Antiques Roadshow and Gunpowder.
121	Celebrity Special for SU2C	3 November 2017	5.50
Programmes included: University Challenge, Strictly Come Dancing, Nigella: At My Table, Blue Planet II, Eve's Story: Stand Up to Cancer, Celebrity First Dates, Annalesha's Story: Stand Up to Cancer, ITV News on Gove jokes about Weinstein and Bear's Mission with Anthony Joshua.
122	Episode 10	10 November 2017	4.26
Programmes included: Strictly Come Dancing, Chris Tarrant: Extreme Railway Journeys, Louis Theroux: My Scientology Movie, Sheridan, Nigella: At My Table, Blue Planet II, ITV News on £10m offshore tax savings and Gunpowder
123	Episode 11	17 November 2017	3.70
Programmes included: Strictly Come Dancing, ITV News on Trump's Asia trip, Len Goodman's Partners in Rhyme, Gino's Italian Coastal Escape, The Secret Life of the Zoo, Gone to Pot: American Road Trip, BBC News on Brexit date announced for March 2019 and Indecent Proposal.
124	Episode 12	24 November 2017	3.23
Programmes included: I'm a Celebrity... Get Me Out of Here!, Weakest Link Celebrity Special for Children in Need, Mary Berry's Country House Secrets, ITV News on the 70th wedding anniversary of Queen Elizabeth II and Prince Philip, The Secret Life of the Zoo, ITV News on John Lewis & Partners plagiarism row, Blue Planet II and The Theory of Everything.
125	Episode 13	1 December 2017	3.12
Programmes included: Strictly Come Dancing, ITV News on Prince Harry and Meghan Markle engagement, Lost and Found, I'm a Celebrity... Get Me Out of Here!, ITV News on Christmas dinner prices rising, Avatar, Blue Planet II and The Sex Robots Are Coming.
126	Episode 14	8 December 2017	3.03
Programmes included: I'm a Celebrity... Get Me Out of Here!, BBC News on the Damian Green pornography scandal, Paul Hollywood: A Baker's Life, ITV News on the Democratic Unionist Party's refusal to support Brexit agreement, The X Factor, Strictly Come Dancing, Blue Planet II, The Real Marigold on Tour and The King's Speech.
127	Episode 15	15 December 2017	3.34
Programmes included: Strictly Come Dancing, BBC News on Brexit negotiations, Nigella's Christmas Table, ITV News report on thick snowfall, The World's Most Expensive Presents, The Crown, I'm a Celebrity... Get Me Out of Here! and Mamma Mia!.
–	Gogglebox Best of 2017	24 December 2017	N/A

=== Series 11 (2018) ===
No. overall	Episode	Original release date	UK viewers (millions)
128	Episode 1	23 February 2018	4.26
Programmes included: All Together Now, The Wine Show, The Job Interview, This Morning, 24 Hours in Police Custody, ITV News on meat suppliers passing off foreign meat as British, 24 Hours in A&E and Troy: Fall of a City.
129	Episode 2	2 March 2018	4.51
Programmes included: Ant & Dec's Saturday Night Takeaway, BBC News on Snapchat falling by one billion pounds due to Kylie Jenner, Celebrity Haunted Mansion, ITV News on Corbyn's calls for a general election as opposed to a second referendum on EU membership, Point Break, Britain's Brightest Family, Portrait Artist of the Year and Troy: Fall of a City.
130	Episode 3	9 March 2018	4.22
Programmes included: : All Together Now, BBC News on the poisoning of Sergei and Yulia Skripal, The Great Stand Up to Cancer Bake Off, Do the Right Thing with Eamonn and Ruth, The World's Most Extraordinary Homes, BBC News on Brexit, Wild Britain and Dancing on Ice.
131	Episode 4	16 March 2018	4.02
Programmes included: Sir Bruce: A Celebration, ITV News on poisoning of Sergei and Yulia Skripal, One Born Every Minute, ITV News on Donald Trump and Kim Jong-un meeting, Crufts: Best in Show, Troy: Fall of a City, Amazing Hotels: Life Beyond the Lobby and Match of the Day.
132	Episode 5	23 March 2018	3.37
Programmes included: Jane McDonald and Friends, The Andrew Marr Show, Winter Paralympics Live (Curling), Make! Craft Britain, Seven Year Switch, ITV News on Ant McPartlin drink driving scandal, The World's Ugliest Pets and BBC News on Brexit.
133	Episode 6	30 March 2018	3.91
Programmes included: Sport Relief, Top Gear, BBC News report on DNA could be used to store data storage, Great Indian Railway Journeys, Come Home, ITV News on Corbyn's dismissal of Owen Smith and The Bodyguard.
134	Episode 7	6 April 2018	3.57
Programmes included: First Dates, Natural World: Attenborough's Wonder of Eggs, The Generation Game, BBC News report on quantum computing, Come Home, The Yorkshire Vet Casebook, ITV News on China imposing tariffs on US imports and The Silence of the Lambs.
135	Episode 8	13 April 2018	3.37
Programmes included: Change Your Tune, Match of the Day, Made in Yorkshire, The Andrew Marr Show, The Sky at Night, Sex Robots and Us, ITV News on companies reducing sugar due to the sugar tax and Marcella.
136	Episode 9	20 April 2018	3.87
Programmes included: Britain's Got Talent, Buy It Now, The Yorkshire Vet, The Queen's Green Planet, BBC News on 'singing stars' discovered by NASA, Antiques Roadshow, BBC News on suspected chemical weapon sites in Syria and The Shining.
137	Episode 10	27 April 2018	3.98
Programmes included: Britain's Got Talent, BBC News on Arsène Wenger's Arsenal departure, University Challenge, This Morning, The Real Camilla: HRH The Duchess of Cornwall, The Button (TV series), Top of the Shop and The Queen's Birthday Party.
138	Episode 11	4 May 2018	3.68
Programmes included: Love in the Countryside, ITV News on Sajid Javid being appointed Home Secretary, Britain's Got Talent, BBC News on North and South Korean summit, Only Connect, Britain's Best Home Cook, My Year with the Tribe and ITV News on ABBA announcing reunion.
139	Episode 12	11 May 2018	3.47
Programmes included: Who Wants to Be a Millionaire?, ITV News on Trump's "war-zone" comments over London hospitals, Portillo's Hidden History of Britain, Love in the Countryside, BBC News on Johnson's request to Trump not to abandon Iraq nuclear deal, Britain's Got Talent, Spice World and ITV News on the Royal wedding 2018 details.
140	Episode 13	18 May 2018	3.29
Programmes included: Eurovision Song Contest 2018, Buy It Now, Poltergeist, The £100K Drop, Britain's Got Talent, The Andrew Marr Show, Million Pound Menu and Heart Transplant: A Chance to Live.
141	Episode 14	25 May 2018	3.25
Programmes included: Wedding of Prince Harry and Meghan Markle, Jamie's Quick & Easy Food, A Very English Scandal, All Round to Mrs. Brown's, The Andrew Marr Show, BBC News on Ken Livingstone's resignation from the Labour Party and The Handmaid's Tale.
142	Episode 15	1 June 2018	2.65
Programmes included: First Dates, BBC News on report commissioned by the SNP for independence, A Very English Scandal, ITV News on Harvey Weinstein charged with sexual assault allegations, Britain's Got Talent, ITV News on the legalisation of abortion in the Republic of Ireland, Steve Backshall Vs The Monster Mountain and 4 Men, 175 Babies: Britain's Super Sperm Donors.

=== Series 12 (2018) ===
No. overall	Episode	Original release date	UK viewers (millions)
143	Episode 1	7 September 2018	3.64
Programmes included: The X Factor, ITV News on government tax affairs, The Extreme Diet Hotel, Bodyguard, The Joy of Al, ITV News on May "not giving in" for a second referendum, BBC News report on the 'Hogwarts express' in Scotland and Reported Missing.
144	Episode 2	14 September 2018	3.15
Programmes included: The X Factor, BBC News on Boris Johnson "suicide vest" comments, 5 Gold Rings, BBC News on Corbyn rejecting Tony Blair attack, Dragons' Den, Bodyguard, ITV News on Serena Williams 'sexist treatment' and Wanderlust.
145	Episode 3	21 September 2018	3.49
Programmes included: Panorama: Inside No. 10: Deal or No Deal?, The Circle, Monkman & Seagull's Genius Guide to Britain, This Morning, The X Factor, ITV News on Justin Welby Zero-hour contract employers, Bodyguard, Stacey Dooley: Face to Face With Armageddon and Naked Attraction.
146	Episode 4	28 September 2018	3.29
Programmes included: Strictly Come Dancing, ITV News on Brexit negotiations, Antiques Roadshow, BBC News report on recycling plastics, The Yorkshire Vet, The Andrew Marr Show, The Circle, Bodyguard and Gareth Malone's All Star Music Quiz.
147	Episode 5	5 October 2018	3.96
Programmes included: Strictly Come Dancing, Bargain Hunt, The Circle, ITV News on Manchester United F.C's worst league start for 29 years, Celebrity Island with Bear Grylls, ITV News on Brexit negotiations, Drowning in Plastic, The Andrew Marr Show and An American Werewolf in London.
148	Episode 6	12 October 2018	3.77
Programmes included: Gordon, Gino and Fred: Road Trip, ITV News on Banksy's auction shredding, The Great British Bake Off, BBC News on Brett Kavanaugh, Strictly Come Dancing, Ben Fogle: New Lives in the Wild, The Big Audition, Killing Eve and Magic Numbers: Hannah Fry's Mysterious World of Maths.
149	Episode 7	19 October 2018	3.87
Programmes included: The Last Leg, BBC News on Meghan Markle's pregnancy, Killing Eve, Great Modern Railway Challenge, Strictly Come Dancing, Horizon – Avalanche, ITV News report on obesity and This Morning at the Royal Wedding.
150	Celebrity Special for SU2C	26 October 2018	3.58
Programmes included: University Challenge, The Yorkshire Vet, The Haunting of Hill House, Hamish's Story: Stand Up to Cancer, Naked Attraction and Karen's Story: Stand Up to Cancer.
151	Episode 9	2 November 2018	3.91
Programmes included: Only Connect, ITV News on the decline of Club 18-30, Strictly Come Dancing, ITV News on the Philip Green scandal, Killing Eve, Crikey! It's the Irwins, ITV News on Sajid Javid declaring the end of austerity and The Haunting of Hill House.
152	Episode 10	9 November 2018	3.83
Programmes included: The Chase, ITV News on the UK's most unhealthy high street rankings, The Secret Life of the Zoo, The Haunting of Hill House, ITV News on the Spice Girls announcing reunion, Killing Eve, Sheridan Smith: Coming Home and Louis Theroux's Altered States: Love Without Limits.
153	Episode 11	16 November 2018	3.65
Programmes included: First Dates, Dynasties, The Heist, ITV News on the town of Ashburton, Devon's naked calendar, Strictly Come Dancing, They Shall Not Grow Old, What Lies Beneath and Extreme Everest with Ant Middleton.
154	Episode 12	23 November 2018	3.07
Programmes included: I'm a Celebrity... Get Me Out of Here!, John Lewis & Partners Christmas advert, Dynasties, BBC News report on kilograms, University Challenge, This Morning, BBC News on Brexit and The Sinner.
155	Episode 13	30 November 2018	2.78
Programmes included: I'm a Celebrity... Get Me Out of Here!, The Andrew Marr Show, The Apprentice, Mrs. Wilson, BBC News on Brexit, A Hotel for the Super Rich & Famous, Dynasties and Your Questions to the PM: #BBCAskThis.
156	Episode 14	7 December 2018	2.81
Programmes included: The Chase: Celebrity Special, This Morning, Death by Magic, How to Spend It Well at Christmas with Phillip Schofield, BBC News on the G20 Summit, Dynasties, I'm a Celebrity... Get Me Out of Here! and Mrs. Wilson.
157	Episode 15	14 December 2018	3.45
Programmes included: I'm a Celebrity... Get Me Out of Here!, BBC News on May cancelling the Brexit withdrawal agreement vote, First Dates, The Andrew Marr Show, The Secret Life of the Zoo, The Snowman, The Apprentice and BBC News on Theresa May facing a vote of no confidence.
–	Gogglesprogs Christmas Special 2018	18 December 2018	1.58
–	Gogglebox Best Of 2018	24 December 2018	2.54

=== Series 13 (2019) ===
No. overall	Episode	Original release date	UK viewers (millions)
158	Episode 1	22 February 2019	3.53
Programmes included: Smallest Fortune, ITV News on the resignation of 7 Labour MPs, Cold Feet, BBC News on engineers tackling space debris, Famous and Fighting Crime, ITV News on Trump declaring a National Emergency Concerning the Southern Border of the United States, The Greatest Dancer and The Making of Me.
159	Episode 2	1 March 2019	3.73
Programmes included: The Chase Celebrity Special, ITV News on the Duke and Duchess of Sussex's baby shower, Baptiste, BBC News on Theresa May's Brexit deal, This Morning, Child Genius, ITV News on the 91st Academy Awards and The Sex Clinic.
160	Episode 3	8 March 2019	3.59
Programmes included: The Great Stand Up to Cancer Bake Off, The Real Marigold on Tour, Free Solo, BBC News on the first ever exploration of below surface Mars, The Bachelor UK, Race Across the World, Who Wants to Be a Millionaire? and The Andrew Marr Show.
161	Episode 4	15 March 2019	3.06
Programmes include: Only Connect, Politics Live, Dancing on Ice, Cheat, ITV News on Brexit, Baewatch: Parental Guidance, BBC News on Theresa May's parliamentary defeat and After Life.
162	Episode 5	22 March 2019	3.89
Programmes included: All Star Musicals, Mary Berry's Quick Cooking, Harry's Heroes: The Full English, BBC News on the Brexit process, This Morning, The Great Stand Up to Cancer Bake Off, The Yorkshire Vet and The Bay.
163	Episode 6	29 March 2019	3.69
Programmes included: Married at First Sight, ITV News on British Airways flying passenger plane to wrong airport, Race Across the World, ITV News on Donald Trump being cleared of any collision with Russia, This Morning, Catchpoint, BBC News on the EU extending the Brexit deadline to 22 May and The Dirt.
164	Episode 7	5 April 2019	3.75
Programmes included: Australia: Earth's Magical Kingdom, ITV News on YouTuber's mission to send a burger into space, Line of Duty, The Brexit Storm: Laura Kuenssberg's Inside Story, Celebrity Painting Challenge, Mission: Impossible – Ghost Protocol, The Chase and BBC News on Brexit protests outside parliament.
163	Episode 8	12 April 2019	3.99
Programmes included: This Morning, ITV News report on online retailers, Britain's Got Talent, 24 Hours in Police Custody, Blind Date, Our Planet, Line of Duty and ITV News on Trump announcing America is full and unveils wall.
164	Episode 9	19 April 2019	3.44
Programmes included: Jamie's Quick & Easy Food, Britain's Got Talent, Line of Duty, BBC News on Nigel Farage launching the Brexit Party, First Dates, Naked Beach, Our Planet and BBC News on a farmer wanted in Sark.
165	Episode 10	26 April 2019	3.67
Programmes included: Miriam's Dead Good Adventure, ITV News on climate change protests, Line of Duty, Antiques Roadshow, Britain's Got Talent, The Shallows, University Challenge and BBC News on Billie Eilish ASMR.
166	Episode 11	3 May 2019	3.81
Programmes included: Jeremy Wade's Dark Waters, Game of Thrones, Blind Date, Hostile Planet, ITV News report on 1p coins, Line of Duty, BBC News on £60,000 worth of designer clothes dropped off in Kent charity shop and Britain's Got Talent.
167	Episode 12	10 May 2019	3.92
Programmes included: The All New Monty: Who Bares Wins, BBC News on Meghan, Duchess of Sussex giving birth, This Morning, The Yorkshire Vet, Britain's Got Talent, Line of Duty, Sex Tape and BBC News on the Conservative Party losing 1,000 seats.
168	Episode 13	17 May 2019	4.13
Programmes included: Britain's Got Talent, Years and Years, This Morning, Ninja Warrior UK, Hostile Planet, Game of Thrones, Bake Off: The Professionals and Bear's Mission with David Walliams.
169	Episode 14	24 May 2019	3.93
Programmes included: Eurovision Song Contest 2019, Countdown, ITV News on the Electoral Commission launching Brexit Party enquiry, Gentleman Jack, ITV News on Brexit, EastEnders, The Secret Life of the Zoo: Underwater Special and Game of Thrones.
170	Episode 15	31 May 2019	3.13
Programmes included: Piers Morgan's Life Stories, Britain's Got Talent, ITV News on Theresa May standing down as PM, Beat the Chef, BBC News on Michael Gove entering the Conservative leader race, What/If, Jeremy Wade's Dark Waters and BBC News on the 2019 European Parliament election result.

=== Celebrity Gogglebox Series 1 (2019) ===
No. overall	Episode	Original release date	UK viewers (millions)
1	Episode 1	14 June 2019	4.09
Love Island, My Gay Dog and Other Animals, BBC News on Michael Gove's cocaine apology and Rory Stewart's admission to taking opium, Killing Eve, Countdown, It, Antiques Roadshow and Naked Attraction.
2	Episode 2	21 June 2019	4.17
Programmes included: Blind Date, Love Island, Killing Eve, Natural World – Walrus: Two Tonne Tusker, Jeremy Wade's Dark Waters, The Family Brain Game, The Graham Norton Show and American Pie.
3	Episode 3	28 June 2019	3.90
Programmes included: Love Island, Nigella: At My Table, The Nile: Egypt's Great River with Bettany Hughes, BBC News on the police called to Boris Johnson's home, Fatal Attraction, The Wonderful World of Chocolate and Life.
4	Episode 4	5 July 2019	3.99
Programmes included: Countdown, ITV News on May and Putin meeting, First Dates, BBC News on extinct butterfly seen in England, Serengeti, ITV News on US and China truce, BBC News on Donald Trump's meeting with Kim Jong-un, Trevor McDonald's Indian Train Adventure and Titanic.
5	Episode 5	12 July 2019	3.74
Programmes included: This Morning, Extreme Tribe: The Last Pygmies, Serengeti, Killing Eve, ITV News on the christening of Archie Mountbatten-Windsor, 8 Days: To the Moon & Back and Taken.
6	Episode 6	19 July 2019	3.89
Programmes included: The £100K Drop, Serengeti, Killing Eve, The Andrew Neil Interviews: Jeremy Hunt & Boris Johnson, First Dates, Naked Attraction, ITV News on Roberto Bautista Agut's Wimbledon stag do and The Silence of the Lambs.

=== Series 14 (2019–20) ===
No. overall	Episode	Original release date	UK viewers (millions)
171	Episode 1	13 September 2019	3.76
Programmes included: EastEnders, First Dates Hotel, BBC News on Brexit, Peaky Blinders, Gordon Ramsay: Uncharted, Britain's Got Talent: The Champions, ITV News on Parliament shutdown and Expedition with Steve Backshall.
172	Episode 2	20 September 2019	4.03
Programmes included: Japan with Sue Perkins, Jamie's Meat-Free Meals, Peaky Blinders, ITV News on Johnson abandoning Luxembourg conference, ITV News on £1m toilet stolen, World Chase Tag: 2019 World Championships, The Great British Bake Off and The Cameron Interview.
173	Episode 3	27 September 2019	4.20
Programmes included: Supermarket Sweep, The Circle, Peaky Blinders, ITV News on Prince Andrew sex scandal, Britain's Got Talent: The Champions, ITV News on Boris Johnson breaks the law, Strictly Come Dancing and ITV News on the collapse of Thomas Cook Group.
174	Episode 4	4 October 2019	4.24
Programmes included: The Circle, Antiques Roadshow, The Andrew Marr Show, Treasure Island with Bear Grylls, Britain's Got Talent: The Champions, BBC News on Naga Munchetty open letter, BBC News on Amber Rudd accusing Boris Johnson of violent language and World on Fire.
175	Episode 5	11 October 2019	4.18
Programmes included: Strictly Come Dancing, ITV News on Boris Johnson Jennifer Arcuri affair accusation, A Quiet Place, BBC News on Prince Harry invoking legal action against tabloid press, Celebrity First Dates Hotel, ITV News on Brexit, The Circle, This Morning and Britain's Got Talent: The Champions.
176	Episode 6	18 October 2019	3.93
Programmes included: The X Factor: Celebrity, ITV News report on handshakes, Pain, Pus and Poison: The Search for Modern Medicines, Celebrity Hunted, ITV News on Eliud Kipchoge breaking marathon record, Own the Sky: Jetpack Dreamers, ITV News on Johnson's first Queen's Speech and The Lesbian Guide to Straight Sex.
177	Celebrity Special for SU2C	25 October 2019	4.22
Programmes included: The Chase Celebrity Special, Strictly Come Dancing, ITV News on Prince William and Prince Harry on "different paths", Brett's Story: Stand Up to Cancer, Halloween, Daniel's Story: Stand Up to Cancer, Brexit Deal Votes: BBC News Special and University Challenge.
178	Episode 8	1 November 2019	4.58
Programmes included: Take Me Out, This Morning, BBC News on Brexit deadline extension, Seven Worlds, One Planet, The World According to Vladimir Putin, The Revenant, BBC News report on dark energy and The Great British Bake Off.
179	Episode 9	8 November 2019	4.22
Programmes included: Strictly Come Dancing, Celebrity Hunted, Four Rooms with Sarah Beeny, BBC News on the Liberal Democrats launching election campaign, Beautiful Baking with Juliet Sear, The Impossible, ITV News on Farage giving Johnson an ultimatum and Seven Worlds, One Planet.
180	Episode 10	15 November 2019	3.96
Programmes included: This Morning, Strictly Come Dancing, Flirty Dancing, BBC News on the 2019 United Kingdom general election, Dom Does America, Bridesmaids, Only Connect and BBC News on Remembrance Sunday.
181	Episode 11	22 November 2019	3.77
Programmes included: I'm a Celebrity... Get Me Out of Here!, Good Morning Britain, Prince Andrew & the Epstein Scandal: The Newsnight Interview, A Party Election Broadcast by the Liberal Democrats, Mountain Vets, The War of the Worlds, Into the Wind and Johnson vs. Corbyn: The ITV Debate.
182	Episode 12	29 November 2019	3.35
Programmes included: Dom Does America, Good Morning Britain, Seven Worlds, One Planet, Question Time Leaders Special, I'm a Celebrity... Get Me Out of Here!, A Very Yorkshire Brothel, The Crown and Buy It Now for Christmas.
183	Episode 13	6 December 2019	3.35
Programmes included: The X Factor: Celebrity, Victoria Derbyshire, I'm a Celebrity... Get Me Out of Here!, The Crown, The Andrew Marr Show, Panorama: The Prince and the Epstein Scandal, This Morning and First Dates.
184	Episode 14	13 December 2019	3.98
Programmes included: Not the Robbie Williams Christmas Show, BBC News on Doping in Russia leading to a ban of 4 years from international sports events, The X Factor: The Band, The Crown, I'm a Celebrity... Get Me Out of Here!, Made in Chelsea: Buenos Aires, BBC News on Anthony Joshua wins rematch against Andy Ruiz Jr. and The Apprentice.
–	Celebrity Gogglebox 2019 Highlights	20 December 2019	2.72
–	Gogglesprogs Christmas Special 2019	23 December 2019	1.80
Programmes included: Flirty Dancing, Serengti, The X Factor: Celebrity, Extinction Rebellion: Last Chance to Save the World?, The Day We Walked on the Moon, Supermarket Sweep, Driven: The Billy Monger Story and Elf.
185	Gogglebox Best Of 2019	24 December 2019	2.73
186	Gogglebox Festive Special	3 January 2020	3.97
Programmes included: Jane and Friends, A Berry Royal Christmas, A Merry Royal Christmas with Lucy Worsley, Gavin & Stacey, Strictly Come Dancing, Home Alone, Celebrity Catchphrase, Dracula, Top Gear, The Chase Celebrity Special and Gremlins.

=== Series 15 (2020) ===
No. overall	Episode	Original release date	UK viewers (millions)
187	Episode 1	21 February 2020	4.39
Programmes included: EastEnders, ITV News on 15 royal staff lose jobs over 'Megxit', Crazy Delicious, Love Is Blind, Hunted, The Stranger, Spy in the Wild and ITV News report on conscious brain surgery.
188	Episode 2	28 February 2020	4.10
Programmes included: Ant & Dec's Saturday Night Takeaway, This Morning, ITV News on the Harvey Weinstein guilty verdict, The Stranger, 24 Hours in A&E, EastEnders, Hunted and The Sex Clinic.
189	Episode 3	6 March 2020	4.91
Programmes included: First Dates, ITV News on Boris Johnson and his fiancé expecting their first child, This Morning, Liar, Love Is Blind, BBC News on Justin Trudeau cancelling the Duke and Duchess of Sussex's funding, Antiques Roadshow, The Stranger and BBC News on the first British man to die of coronavirus.
190	Episode 4	13 March 2020	4.58
Programmes included: Five Guys a Week, ITV News on Johnson urging the public not to 'bulk buy', The Stranger, ITV News report on the Duke & Duchess of Sussex, Dragons' Den, Crufts 2020: Best in Show, Liar and Antiques Roadshow.
191	Episode 5	20 March 2020	5.27
Programmes included: The Yorkshire Vet, BBC News on social distancing orders, Liar, Celebrity Mastermind, Hunted, BBC News on Europe seeing the world's worst outbreak of the coronavirus, Race Across the World and This Morning.
192	Episode 6	27 March 2020	5.59
Programmes included: Ant & Dec's Saturday Night Takeaway, BBC News on the government's pledge to pay 80% of people's wages during lockdown, Earth's Magical Kingdom, This Morning, The Repair Shop, The Nest, Prime Ministerial Statement and The Mandalorian.
193	Episode 7	3 April 2020	5.83
Programmes included: Celebrity Murder Mystery, BBC News on the Prime Minister Boris Johnson testing positive for coronavirus, The Andrew Marr Show, Gordon, Gino and Fred: American Road Trip, This Morning, Jamie: Keep Cooking and Carry On, The Nest, BBC News on the police issuing fines to those disobeying social distancing rules and The Great Stand Up to Cancer Bake Off.
194	Episode 8	10 April 2020	6.10
Programmes included: HealthCheck UK Live, Keeping Up with the Kardashians, Tiger King: Murder, Mayhem and Madness, Coronavirus: How Clean is Your House?, The Nest, BBC News on the Prime Minister being admitted to hospital, BBC News on the Prime Minister being admitted to intensive care, Liar and An Address by Her Majesty the Queen.
195	Episode 9	17 April 2020	6.18
Programmes included: Britain's Got Talent, The Yorkshire Vet, Gordon, Gino & Fred: American Road Trip, BBC News on Boris Johnson leaving hospital, Dynamo: Beyond Belief, The Nest, BBC News on Donald Trump and Quiz.
196	Episode 10	24 April 2020	6.10
Programmes included: Too Hot to Handle, BBC News on face masks during the COVID-19 pandemic, Kings of Pain, BBC News on the Together at Home concert, Killing Eve, The Yorkshire Vet, Celebrity SAS: Who Dares Wins and The Andrew Marr Show.
197	Episode 11	1 May 2020	5.90
Programmes included: Beat the Chasers, This Morning, BBC News on Trump suggesting injections of disinfectant will kill COVID-19, Grayson's Art Club, CBeebies Bedtime Stories, ITV News on famous athletes keeping fit at home, Killing Eve, Race Across the World and BBC News on Johnson's return to Downing Street.
198	Episode 12	8 May 2020	5.77
Programmes included: This Morning, ITV News on proposed NHS contact tracing app, Richard & Judy: Keep Reading and Carry On, Coronation Street, Britain's Got Talent, BBC News on Trump claiming COVID-19 is man-made, Jamie: Keep Cooking and Carry On, After Life and ITV News on Kim Jong-un's apparent public appearance.
199	Episode 13	15 May 2020	5.96
Programmes included: Who Wants to Be a Millionaire?, This Morning, Hospital: Fighting Covid-19, After Life, Elephant, A Ministerial Broadcast by the Prime Minister, Paul Hollywood Eats Japan and VE Day 75: The People's Celebration.
200	Episode 14	22 May 2020	6.26
Programmes included: First Dates Hotel, BBC Breakfast on Eurovision: Europe Shine a Light, The Fantastical Factory of Curious Craft, Harry's Heroes: Euro Having a Laugh, Britain's Got Talent, After Life, The Andrew Marr Show and Orphan.
201	Episode 15 (Best Of Series 15)	29 May 2020	4.34

=== Celebrity Gogglebox Series 2 (2020) ===
No. overall	Episode	Original release date	UK viewers (millions)
7	Episode 1	5 June 2020	6.36
Programmes included: Gordon Ramsay's 24 Hours to Hell and Back, BBC Breakfast on Take That's virtual reunion with Robbie Williams, Ambulance, Good Morning Britain on Dominic Cummings's lockdown rule break, Misery, Britain's Got Talent, Alan Carr's Epic Game Show and The Favourite
8	Episode 2	12 June 2020	5.72
Programmes included: This Morning, The Titan Games, BBC News report on COVID-19, 1966 FIFA World Cup Final, Bradley Walsh & Son: Breaking Dad, Casino Royale, Little Fires Everywhere and Naked Attraction.
9	Episode 3	19 June 2020	5.46
Programmes included: First Dates, BBC News on 2-metre social distancing rule being reviewed, Us, BBC News on Queen Elizabeth II birthday celebrations, Scarface, Big Brother: Best Shows Ever, Countdown and Sex in Lockdown: Keep Shagging and Carry On.
10	Episode 4	26 June 2020	5.06
Programmes included: Dating Around, BBC News on lockdown easing in England, Hostile Planet, Big Brother: Best Shows Ever, Mission: Impossible – Rogue Nation, BBC News on schools returning in September, This Morning, The Repair Shop and EastEnders.
11	Episode 5	3 July 2020	5.36
Programmes included: This Morning, ITV News on foreign travel, Planet Earth II, EastEnders, BBC News on beaches and travel, Cape Fear, Bradley Walsh & Son: Breaking Dad and 127 Hours.
12	Episode 6	10 July 2020	5.38
Programmes included: Bake Off: The Professionals, ITV News on drunk people not following social distancing guidelines, Grease, Gordon Ramsay's 24 Hours to Hell and Back, The Supervet: Noel Fitzpatrick, Celebrity MasterChef and Thelma & Louise.
13	Episode 7	17 July 2020	5.36
Programmes included: Antiques Roadshow, BBC News on Donald Trump and face masks, BBC News on a thirteen-year-old girl designing the Spitfire on the Battle of Britain's 80th anniversary, Unsolved Mysteries, BBC News on the government deciding if face masks should be mandatory in England, It Chapter Two, Blue Planet II and Basic Instinct.

=== Series 16 (2020–21) ===
No. overall	Episode	Original release date	UK viewers (millions)
202	Episode 1	11 September 2020	5.52
Programmes included: Mary Berry's Simple Comforts, BBC News on coronavirus UK travel restrictions, Britain's Got Talent, Elephant Hospital, (Un)well, BBC News report on students returning to University, Countdown, ITV News on Brexit negotiations and When Harry Met Sally....
203	Episode 2	18 September 2020	5.72
Programmes included: Who Wants to Be a Millionaire?, BBC News on Britain's coronavirus cases rising, (Un)well, Des, BBC Breakfast, The Third Day, ITV News on Brexit and Extinction: The Facts.
204	Episode 3	25 September 2020	6.03
Programmes included: The Great British Bake Off, Get Organized with The Home Edit, Yorkshire Tea vs PG Tips: Battle Of The Brews, Ratched, EastEnders, Politics Live on Boris Johnson announcing new coronavirus restrictions, The Third Day and The Andrew Marr Show.
205	Episode 4	2 October 2020	6.46
Programmes included: Family Fortunes, This Morning, First Dates, BBC News on students returning to University, Jamie: Keep Cooking Family Favourites, Council House Britain, BBC News on the financial impact of Coronavirus in the British royal family, Ratched, and BBC News on Boris Johnson apologising for being unclear on new Coronavirus restrictions.
206	Episode 5	9 October 2020	6.35
Programmes included: Top Gear, The Savoy, The Andrew Marr Show, Simply Nigella, American Murder: The Family Next Door, ITV News on COVID-19 cases system overload glitch, The Yorkshire Vet, and BBC News on Donald Trump testing positive for coronavirus and his return to the White House.
207	Episode 6	16 October 2020	6.38
Programmes included: First Dates, BBC News on rising coronavirus cases, Only Connect, Made in Chelsea, Britain's Got Talent, ITV News on Donald Trump's presidential campaign, Autumn at Jimmy's Farm, The Haunting of Bly Manor, and BBC News on Boris Johnson announcing tier system for England.
208	Celebrity Special for SU2C	23 October 2020	6.33
Programmes included: Family Fortunes, Five Guys a Week, Scream, Emily's Story: Stand Up to Cancer, The Million Pound Cube, ITV News on northern tier 3 covid restrictions, Rebecca's Story: Stand Up To Cancer, The Andrew Marr Show, and Simply Nigella.
209	Episode 8	30 October 2020	6.47
Programmes included: Strictly Come Dancing, The Million Pound Cube, The Undoing, BBC Breakfast on the supermarket ban in Wales, The Yorkshire Vet, BBC News at One on the second presidential debate between Joe Biden and Donald Trump, First Dates, BBC News report on playing the piano with Dementia and This Morning.
210	Episode 9	6 November 2020	6.78
Programmes included: BBC News on the death of Sean Connery, Don't Rock The Boat, Borat Subsequent Moviefilm, BBC News on coronavirus cases rising across the UK, My Next Guest Needs No Introduction with David Letterman, BBC News Special on Boris Johnson announcing England's second national lockdown, Strictly Come Dancing, Good Morning Britain on Nigel Farage & Donald Trump and The Undoing.
211	Episode 10	13 November 2020	6.62
Programmes included: Strictly Come Dancing, BBC News at Six on the new Pfizer–BioNTech COVID-19 vaccine, I'm a Celebrity... Get Me Out of Here!: A Jungle Story, BBC News on the 2020 United States presidential election results, 24 Hours in Police Custody, Nigella's Cook, Eat, Repeat and Naked Attraction.
212	Episode 11	20 November 2020	5.98
Programmes included: Strictly Come Dancing, I'm a Celebrity... Get Me Out of Here!, BBC News on Boris Johnson self isolating, Nigella's Cook, Eat, Repeat, James May: Oh Cook, BBC News on Donald Trump and Republican supporters refusing the results of the 2020 election, Naked Attraction, BBC News on Dominic Cummings departure from Downing Street and The Crown
213	Episode 12	27 November 2020	5.86
Programmes included: Strictly Come Dancing, The Great British Bake Off, The Undoing, We Are The Champions, BBC News on the approval of the Pfizer–BioNTech COVID-19 vaccine in the UK, The Toe Bro, ITV News on the relaxation of restrictions during the Christmas period and The Crown.
214	Episode 13	4 December 2020	5.41
Programmes included: Michael McIntyre's The Wheel, This Morning, Tiny World, I'm a Celebrity... Get Me Out of Here!, BBC News on conservative MPs unhappy on the Tier restrictions in England, First Dates, Good Morning Britain on Michael Gove clarifying the substantial meal rule in pubs and The Undoing.
215	Episode 14	11 December 2020	6.67
Programmes included: I'm a Celebrity... Get Me Out of Here!, Nigella's Cook, Eat, Repeat, Swamp People: Swamp Invasion, ITV News on the delay of Brexit talks, Coronation Street, Tiny World, ITV News on Margaret Keenan being the first person in the world to receive the Pfizer–BioNTech COVID-19 vaccine and Mariah Carey's Magical Christmas Special.
–	Celebrity Gogglebox 2020 Highlights	18 December 2020	4.03
–	Gogglebox Best of 2020	25 December 2020	3.73
216	Gogglebox Festive Special	8 January 2021	5.42
Programmes included: The Real Full Monty On Ice, Would I Lie to You?, Inside KFC At Christmas, The Sound of Music, Penguins: Meet The Family, Fanny Craddock Cooks For Christmas, The Chase Celebrity Christmas Special, Final Destination, Gordon, Gino and Fred Desperately Seeking Santa, A Perfect Planet and Home Alone 2: Lost in New York.

=== Series 17 (2021) ===
No. overall	Episode	Original release date	UK viewers (millions)
217	Episode 1	26 February 2021	6.33
Programmes included: Ant & Dec's Saturday Night Takeaway, BBC News Special on Boris Johnson's roadmap out of lockdown, Gordon Ramsay's Bank Balance, This Morning, Snakes in the City, Surviving Death, Married at First Sight Australia and It's a Sin.
218	Episode 2	5 March 2021	6.73
Programmes included: Pooch Perfect, The Late Late Show with James Corden, Drawers Off, Your Honor, ITV News on Donald Trump's ambitions of running for president in 2024, Million Pound Pawn, Married at First Sight Australia, and Stand Up and Deliver.
219	Episode 3	12 March 2021	7.03
Programmes included: The Celebrity Circle, Amazing Hotels: Life Beyond the Lobby, BBC News on the 1% NHS pay rise, Teen First Dates, Oprah with Meghan and Harry, BBC News on the Queen's first statement regarding Meghan Markle and Prince Harry's claims in the Oprah interview, Paranormal Lockdown UK and Good Morning Britain On Piers Morgan and Alex Beresford's on-air argument regarding Meghan and Harry's Oprah interview.
220	Episode 4	19 March 2021	6.62
Programmes included: This Morning, Baywatch, Jamie: Keep Cooking Family Favourites, CBeebies Bedtime Story, The Circle, Escape from Pretoria, BBC News on Prince Philip being discharged from hospital and Naked Attraction.
221	Episode 5	26 March 2021	6.70
Programmes included: Ant & Dec's Saturday Night Takeaway, This Is My House, This Morning, Formula 1: Drive to Survive, Countdown, The Proof Is Out There, BBC News on the record number of COVID-19 vaccines given in 24 hours in the UK & if foreign holidays will be allowed in the summer and Line of Duty.
222	Episode 6	2 April 2021	6.64
Programmes included: Teen First Dates, Matt Hancock interview on This Morning, BBC and ITV News on the 2021 Suez Canal obstruction, Line of Duty, Remarkable Places to Eat, The Circle, The Great Stand Up to Cancer Bake Off and The Flight Attendant.
223	Episode 7	9 April 2021	6.30
Programmes included: The Graham Norton Show, Made in Chelsea, BBC News on how only 40% of pubs will reopen in England on stage 2 of the roadmap out of lockdown, Line of Duty, Dragons' Den, Louis Theroux: Shooting Joe Exotic, The Invisible Man and BBC News Special on Boris Johnson confirming the second stage of the roadmap is to go ahead as planned.
224	Episode 8	16 April 2021	5.80
Programmes included: I Can See Your Voice, BBC Breaking News report announcing the Death of Prince Philip, Duke of Edinburgh, Escape to the Farm with Kate Humble, Alan Carr's Epic Gameshow, ITV News on pubs and shops reopening in England, Line of Duty, Running Wild with Bear Grylls and Naked Attraction.
225	Episode 9	23 April 2021	6.19
Programmes included: Game of Talents, BBC News report on The Funeral of Prince Philip, Duke of Edinburgh, Four in a Bed, Catfish UK: The TV Show, Cher & the Loneliest Elephant, Paranormal Activity, Good Morning Britain interview with the pub landlord who clashed with Keir Starmer and Line of Duty.
226	Episode 10	30 April 2021	6.03
Programmes included: Mastermind, BBC News on Dominic Cummings' allegations against Boris Johnson, Alan Carr's Epic Gameshow, Baby Surgeons: Delivering Miracles, Dr. Pimple Popper, Line of Duty, Snackmasters and The Art of the Joy of Sex.
227	Episode 11	7 May 2021	6.13
Programmes included: I Can See Your Voice, ITV News on the prime minister’s phone number, Beat the Chasers, My Octopus Teacher, Sex and the City, Catfish UK: The TV Show, Earth At Night In Colour and Line of Duty.
228	Episode 12	14 May 2021	6.51
Programmes included: Secret Crush, Dragons' Den, Lego Masters USA, BBC News on holidays, This Morning, SAS: Who Dares Wins, Three Families and Headspace: Guide to Sleep.
229	Episode 13	21 May 2021	6.27
Programmes included: Tom Allen’s Quizness, Gregg Wallace’s Big Weekend Away, The Andrew Marr Show, Running Wild with Bear Grylls, Dung Dynasty, Mare of Easttown, ITV News on international flights and Mamma Mia! Here We Go Again.
230	Episode 14 (Best Of Series 17)	6 August 2021	3.24

=== Celebrity Gogglebox Series 3 (2021) ===
No. overall	Episode	Original release date	UK viewers (millions)
14	Episode 1	4 June 2021	5.49
Programmes included: The Masked Dancer, Bake Off: The Professionals, Secret Crush, Supervet Special: Saving My Dog, This Morning, Jurassic Park, Hometown Horror and Friends: The Reunion.
15	Episode 2	11 June 2021	5.10
Programmes included: Tom Allen's Quizness, The Masked Dancer, Gordon Ramsay's 24 Hours to Hell and Back, BBC News on whether all Coronavirus restrictions can be lifted on 21 June in England, Top Gear, Naked Attraction, The Bad Skin Clinic and Dirty Dancing.
16	Episode 3	18 June 2021	5.12
Programmes included: Clarkson's Farm, Fresh, Fried and Crispy, ITV News on the 47th G7 summit, Tiny World, Snakes on a Plane, BBC Breakfast on a lobster fisherman who was almost swallowed by a Humpback whale, 10 Years Younger in 10 Days and Lupin.
17	Episode 4	25 June 2021	5.42
Programmes included: First Dates, Dragons' Den, Extreme Sisters, Don't Tell the Bride, The Yorkshire Vet, Too Hot to Handle, Gok Wan's Easy Asian and The Woman in the Window.
18	Episode 5	2 July 2021	4.52
Programmes included: Dickinson's Real Deal, ITV and BBC News on the Matt Hancock and Gina Coladangelo affair scandal, and ultimately his resignation as Health Secretary, Countdown, Tiny World, BBC News on the UK's traffic light travel update, The Handmaid's Tale, Bake Off: The Professionals and Back to the Future.
19	Episode 6	9 July 2021	4.95
Programmes included: America's Got Talent, BBC News on England winning the UEFA Euro 2020 quarter final against Ukraine, Love Island, Clarkson's Farm, Help! My House Is Haunted, Sex/Life, The Handmaid's Tale and Celebrity Karaoke Club.
20	Episode 7	16 July 2021	4.64
Programmes included: Only Connect, BBC News on England losing the UEFA Euro 2020 Final to Italy and the racist abuse that three England players had received, Cooking With The Stars, Catfish UK: The TV Show, Cat People, Too Hot to Handle, The Yorkshire Vet and Jaws.
21	Episode 8	23 July 2021	4.80
Programmes included: Can I Improve My Memory, Sexy Beasts, ITV News on the lifting of all lockdown restrictions in England despite cases rising, Schmigadoon!, ITV News on Boris Johnson and Rishi Sunak's U-turn decision to self isolate after the Health Secretary tested positive for COVID-19, Naked and Afraid, Who Wants to Be a Millionaire? and Crawl.
22	Episode 9 (Black To Front Special)	10 September 2021	3.68
Programmes included: Married at First Sight UK, BBC Breakfast on ABBA announcing their first studio album in 40 years, Celebrity SAS: Who Dares Wins, ITV News on England football players being targeted with racial abuse by Hungary fans during a 2022 World cup qualifier match, Changing Rooms, Skin A&E, Top of the Pops 1991 and Get Out.

=== Series 18 (2021–22) ===
No. overall	Episode	Original release date	UK viewers (millions)
231	Episode 1	17 September 2021	5.15
Programmes included: Ready to Mingle, Antiques Roadshow, ITV News on Emma Raducanu winning the 2021 US Open Women's Singles, Vigil, Take a Hike, Help, Life Drawing Live! and Beat the Chasers.
232	Episode 2	24 September 2021	5.28
Programmes included: The Great British Bake Off, Changing Rooms, BBC News on the energy crisis and shortage of Carbon dioxide supply in the UK, This Morning, Michel Roux's French Country Cooking, Sex Actually with Alice Levine, ITV News on the latest changes to the COVID-19 travel rules in England and Vigil.
233	Episode 3	1 October 2021	5.13
Programmes included: Strictly Come Dancing, Serengeti II, ITV News on the fuel crisis, Ambulance, Hotel Paranormal, Keir Starmer on The Andrew Marr Show, Come Dine with Me, and Vigil.
234	Episode 4	8 October 2021	5.47
Programmes included: Strictly Come Dancing, Extreme Food Phobics, Family Fortunes, Boris Johnson on The Andrew Marr Show, The Hairy Bikers Go North, The Mating Game, BBC News on the 2021 Facebook outage, and Squid Game.
235	Episode 5 and Celebrity Special for SU2C	15 October 2021	N/A
Programmes included: The Great British Bake Off, Countdown, The Mating Game, Liam's Story: Stand Up to Cancer, Sex Actually with Alice Levine, Cassie's Story: Stand Up to Cancer, Made in Chelsea and Squid Game.
236	Episode 6	22 October 2021	5.14
Programmes included: Strictly Come Dancing, The Love Trap, Killers of the Cosmos, Ashley Banjo: Britain in Black and White, Celebrity Trash Monsters: What's Your Waste Size?, You, The Mating Game and Coronation Street.
237	Episode 7	29 October 2021	4.98
Programmes included: Dom Delivers, The Cube, This Morning, Coronation Street, Strictly Come Dancing, A Nightmare on Elm Street 3: Dream Warriors, Celebrity Ghost Trip and Sex, Love, and Goop.
238	Episode 8	5 November 2021	5.29
Programmes included: Family Fortunes, ITV News on the opening day of COP 26, Celebrity Yorkshire Auction House, The Mating Game, You, ITV News on scientists saying that dogs appear to learn words in the same way that human babies do and The Outlaws.
239	Episode 9	12 November 2021	5.13
Programmes included: Nadiya's Fast Flavours, This Morning, Animal, ITV News on a Maldon District Council meeting in Essex being abandoned after a member repeatedly interjected proceedings, Sitting On A Fortune, Close to Me, UFO Witness and You.
240	Episode 10	19 November 2021	4.66
Programmes included: The Graham Norton Show, This Morning, Celebrity Antiques Road Trip, Strictly Come Dancing, Who Wants to Be a Millionaire? Celebrity Special, The Lakes with Simon Reeve, Mary Berry: Love To Cook and Sex Unzipped.
241	Episode 11	26 November 2021	4.85
Programmes included: An Audience with Adele, Newsnight on Boris Johnson's speech at the CBI conference, Michael McIntyre's The Wheel, Inside Beverly Hills: The Land of the Rich and Famous, BBC and ITV News on protests in Europe against COVID-19 vaccine mandates and lockdowns, Close to Me, I'm a Celebrity...Get Me Out of Here! and Tiger King 2.
242	Episode 12	3 December 2021	4.64
Programmes included: I'm a Celebrity...Get Me Out of Here!, ITV News and BBC News Special on the new variant of Coronavirus called Omicron as well as the tightening of face mask rules in England, Miriam and Alan: Lost in Scotland, Inside Beverly Hills: The Land of the Rich and Famous, BBC News on the migrant Channel crossings, True Story, Tiger King 2 and Close to Me.
243	Episode 13	10 December 2021	4.53
Programmes included: Strictly Come Dancing, The Pet Show, Selling Sunset, ITV News on the leaked video of Downing street staff joking about holding a prohibited Christmas party in 2020, True Story, Welcome to Earth, How to Make It on OnlyFans and Mariah's Christmas: The Magic Continues.
–	Celebrity Gogglebox 2021 Highlights	17 December 2021	2.67
–	Gogglebox Best of 2021	25 December 2021	2.81
244	Gogglebox Festive Special	2 January 2022	3.74
Programmes included: Michael McIntyre's Christmas Wheel, First Dates At Christmas, Strictly The Real Full Monty, Jamie: Together at Christmas, Love Actually, World's Strongest Man, I Can See Your Voice Christmas Special, The Repair Shop At Christmas, Elves, Nigella's Cook, Eat, Repeat and No Time to Die.

=== Series 19 (2022) ===
No. overall	Episode	Original release date	UK viewers (millions)
245	Episode 1	18 February 2022	5.08
Programmes included: The Masked Singer, First Dates: Valentine's, Dragons' Den, Trigger Point, Dancing on Ice, Mary Beard's Forbidden Art, BBC News on the cost of living crisis and Pam & Tommy.
246	Episode 2	25 February 2022	4.83
Programmes included: Starstruck, Celebrity Help! My House Is Haunted, Bradley & Barney Walsh: Breaking Dad, Teen First Dates, Boris Johnson on Sunday Morning, Love Is Blind, BBC News Special on Boris Johnson announcing his plans to scrap all remaining COVID-19 legal restrictions in England and Cheaters.
247	Episode 3	4 March 2022	4.74
Programmes included: Peaky Blinders, Love Is Blind, Coronation Street, Celebrity Hunted, Starstruck, Celebrity Mastermind, This Morning and BBC News on Ukraine.
248	Episode 4	11 March 2022	4.56
Programmes included: Killing Eve, The Apprentice, Our House, Naked Attraction, Ant and Dec's Saturday Night Takeaway, Celebrity Hunted and Dragons' Den.
249	Episode 5	18 March 2022	4.44
Programmes included: Crufts 2022: Best in Show, This Is Going To Hurt, Formula 1: Drive to Survive, This Is MY House for Red Nose Day, Byron Baes, Haunted Hospitals and BBC News on homes for Ukraine.
250	Episode 6	25 March 2022	4.93
Programmes included: Dynasties II, Pieces of Her, Celebrity Mastermind, TOTP: 1992 Biggest Hits, Hospital: Road to Recovery, Good Morning Britain and BBC News on Putin rally.
251	Episode 7	1 April 2022	4.72
Programmes included: Bridgerton, Gordon Ramsay's Future Food Stars, Dynasties II, The Great Big Tiny Design Challenge with Sandi Toksvig, Starstruck, This Morning and ITV News on Will Smith vs Chris Rock.
252	Episode 8	8 April 2022	4.60
Programmes included: Made in Chelsea, Gordon Ramsay's Future Food Stars, Holidaying with Jane McDonald, Scam Interceptors, ITV News on Cost of Living, Channel 4's Open House: The Great Sex Experiment, Peaky Blinders.
253	Episode 9	15 April 2022	4.26
Programmes included: The 1% Club, Get Organized with The Home Edit, SAS: Who Dares Wins, BBC News on Boris Johnson's apology for breaking lockdown rules, Freeze the Fear with Wim Hof, Bridgerton, ITV News on Rishi Sunak's wife tax affairs and Made in Chelsea.
254	Episode 10	22 April 2022	4.72
Programmes included: Britain's Got Talent, The Thief, His Wife and the Canoe, Romeo and Duet, Freeze the Fear with Wim Hof, Stacey Dooley Sleeps Over and Expedition Bigfoot.
255	Episode 11	29 April 2022	4.28
Programmes included: Britain's Got Talent, Bridgerton, Romeo and Duet, The 1% Club, Inside the Force 24/7, Piers Morgan Uncensored, Formula 1: Drive to Survive and BBC News.
256	Episode 12	6 May 2022	4.99
Programmes included: Britain's Got Talent, One Night Stand, Gordon Ramsay's Future Food Stars, Great British History Hunters, Freeze the Fear with Wim Hof and Good Morning Britain (PM Interview).
257	Episode 13	13 May 2022	4.89
Programmes included: Made in Chelsea, Bee Czar, The Circle US, Ross Kemp: Shipwreck Treasure Hunter, BBC News on Keir Starmer being investigated for breaking lockdown rules, Gordon Ramsay's Future Food Stars, BBC News on the 2022 United Kingdom local elections and Heartstopper.
258	Episode 14	20 May 2022	4.87
Programmes included: Beat the Chasers, The Queen's Platinum Jubilee Celebration, Eurovision Song Contest 2022, Lovestruck High, ITV News on the Platinum Pudding, The Repair Shop and Drag Me to Hell.
259	Episode 15	27 May 2022	4.48
Programmes included: Britain's Got Talent, Dickinson's Real Deal, Bake Off: The Professionals, BBC News on partygate, Hunted, Top of the Pops 1992, Made in Chelsea and Love in the Jungle.
260	Episode 16 (Best Of Series 19)	3 June 2022	(<2.91)

=== Celebrity Gogglebox Series 4 (2022) ===
No. overall	Episode	Original release date	UK viewers (millions)
23	Episode 1	10 June 2022	4.41
Programmes included: The 1% Club, Platinum Party at the Palace, Hunted, Spooked Scotland, Bargain Hunt, Celebrity Karaoke Club and Stranger Things.
24	Episode 2	17 June 2022	3.93
Programmes included: The Savoy, Who Wants to Be a Millionaire? for Soccer Aid, This Is My House, Million Pound Pawn, Stranger Things, BBC News on the cancellation of Neighbours and Romeo & Duet.
25	Episode 3	24 June 2022	3.71
Programmes included: Love Island, Spooked Scotland, Saturday Night Fever, The Bridge: Race to a Fortune, Snowflake Mountain, Alan Carr's Epic Gameshow: Celebrity Special and Fifty Shades of Grey.
26	Episode 4 - Pride special	1 July 2022	3.81
Programmes included: This Is My House, Glastonbury 2022 (Diana Ross set), The One That Got Away, Man vs. Bee, One Question, Scream and Big Boys.
27	Episode 5	8 July 2022	3.90
Programmes included: The One That Got Away, America the Beautiful, One Question, Million Pound Pawn, The Laundry Guy, The Baby and CODA.
28	Episode 6	15 July 2022	3.67
Programmes included: Countdown, How to Build a Sex Room, Paul Hollywood Eats... Mexico, Long Lost Family, Stranger Things, Love Island and BBC News on the resignation of Boris Johnson.

=== Series 20 (2022–23) ===
No. overall	Episode	Original release date	UK viewers (millions)
261	Episode 1	9 September 2022	3.70
Programmes included: The Masked Dancer, This is MY House, Married at First Sight UK, Epic Adventures with Bertie Gregory, Bad Sisters, ITV News on the election of Liz Truss as the new Prime Minister of the United Kingdom and Nadiya's Everyday Baking.
262	Episode 2	16 September 2022	3.92
Programmes included: BBC News announcing the death of Elizabeth II, Ninja Warrior UK: Race for Glory, Who Wants to Be a Millionaire?, Frozen Planet II, ITV News on the apparent reconciliation of William and Harry and their wives, Married at First Sight UK and HM The King.
263	Episode 3	23 September 2022	3.97
Programmes included: Secret Crush, BBC News on Elizabeth II lying in state, The Grand Tour: A Scandi Flick, The Masked Dancer, Bad Sisters, Frozen Planet II and The State Funeral Of HM Queen Elizabeth II.
264	Episode 4	30 September 2022	4.22
Programmes included: Strictly Come Dancing, Antiques Roadshow, Coronation Street, ITV News on Kwasi Kwarteng's mini-budget and the aftermath of the announcement, Only Connect, Kings of Pain, Frozen Planet II and Help! My House is Haunted.
265	Episode 5	7 October 2022	4.40
Programmes included: Bad Sisters, BBC News on the new energy price cap, Super/Natural, BBC News on the U-Turn of Kwasi Kwarteng's income tax policy, The Kardashians, Emma Willis: Delivering Babies, Nadiya's Everyday Baking and A Trip to Infinity.
266	Episode 6	14 October 2022	4.47
Programmes included: Strictly Come Dancing, This Morning, Sue Perkins: Perfectly Legal, First Dates Hotel, Eli Roth Presents: My Possessed Pet, Our Dementia Choir Sings Again with Vicky McClure, The Ex-Wife and ITV News on the possibility of blackouts.
267	Episode 7	22 October 2022	3.60
Programmes included: I Can See Your Voice, Bargain Hunt, Unbreakable, BBC News on the sacking of Chancellor Kwasi Kwarteng and new Chancellor Jeremy Hunt's reversal of all of PM Liz Truss's economic plans, The Ex-Wife, Strictly Come Dancing and Emmerdale.
268	Celebrity Special for SU2C	28 October 2022	4.36
Programmes included: Love Is Blind, I Can See Your Voice, Only Connect, Dylan-James' Story: Stand Up To Cancer, ITV News on Rishi Sunak being announced as the next Prime Minister, Emily's Story: Stand Up to Cancer and The Watcher.
269	Episode 9	4 November 2022	4.68
Programmes included: Top Gear, Michael McIntyre's The Wheel, Jamie's £1 Wonders, BBC News on the new 50p featuring King Charles III, Wild Croc Territory, Guillermo del Toro's Cabinet of Curiosities, Drink Masters and This Morning.
270	Episode 10	11 November 2022	3.70
Programmes included: I'm a Celebrity... Get Me Out of Here!, University Challenge, Queens for the Night, Alexander Armstrong in South Korea, Hollyoaks, BBC News on the COP27 climate conference in Sharm El Sheikh and Stanley Tucci: Searching for Italy.
271	Episode 11	18 November 2022	3.49
Programmes included: I'm a Celebrity... Get Me Out of Here!, This Morning, Family Fortunes, Love Is Blind, The Great British Bake Off, Mammals and The Crown.
272	Episode 12	25 November 2022	3.83
Programmes included: I'm a Celebrity... Get Me Out of Here!, The Hidden Lives of Pets, Down to Earth with Zac Efron, ITV News on the banning of alcohol in stadiums during the 2022 FIFA World Cup and BBC News on temporary accommodations in fan zones during the tournament, The Crown ,This Morning and You Won't Believe This.
273	Episode 13	2 December 2022	4.28
Programmes included: Michael McIntyre's The Wheel, HELP! My House is Haunted, I'm a Celebrity... Get Me Out of Here!, You Won't Believe This, The Traitors, Mammals and Planet Sex with Cara Delevingne.
274	Episode 14	9 December 2022	3.85
Programmes included: I Can See Your Voice, The Traitors, Gino's Cooking Up Love, This Morning, Lady Chatterley's Lover, Blowing LA and White Christmas.
–	Celebrity Gogglebox 2022 Highlights	16 December 2022	(<3.16)
–	Gogglebox Best of 2022	25 December 2022	(<3.17)
275	Gogglebox Festive Special	2 January 2023	3.34
Programmes included: Michael McIntyre's Christmas Wheel, Jamie's Easy Christmas, Britain Get Singing, The Dog House at Christmas, Top Gun: Maverick, Dance Monsters, The Traitors, A Year on Planet Earth, First Dates at Christmas and Die Hard.

=== Series 21 (2023) ===
No. overall	Episode	Original release date	UK viewers (millions)
276	Episode 1	24 February 2023	4.44
Programmes included: Starstruck, Rick Stein's Cornwall, This Morning, The Piano, You, Stacey Dooley Sleeps Over USA, 24 Hours in A&E and ITV News on TasteAtlas's list of the 100 best rated cheeses in the world.
277	Episode 2	3 March 2023	4.15
Programmes included: Starstruck, Coronation Street, Cheat, Love Island, Catfish UK, Dancing on Ice and Sex Actually with Alice Levine.
278	Episode 3	10 March 2023	4.55
Programmes included: Only Connect, ITV News on Matt Hancock's leaked WhatsApp messages, Married at First Sight Australia, Naked and Afraid, Fall, BBC News on river sewage, Jamie's £1 Wonders and Sex Actually with Alice Levine.
–	Gogglebox 10 Year Anniversary Special	11 March 2023	2.74
Celebrating the best moments of the last 10 years, featuring the Moffatts, Leon and June, Jenny and Lee, Sophie and Pete and more.
279	Episode 4	17 March 2023	3.89
Programmes included: The Apprentice, ITV News on Gary Lineker's suspension from Match of the Day, Wild Isles, Married at First Sight Australia, Starstruck, The Piano, MILF Manor and Match of the Day.
280	Episode 5	24 March 2023	4.32
Programmes included: Challenge Anneka, Race Across the World, The Great Celebrity Bake Off for Stand Up To Cancer, BBC News on the 2023 UN climate change report, Rise and Fall, Wild Isles and This Morning.
281	Episode 6	31 March 2023	4.21
Programmes included: Project Icon: The UK's Next Music Star, Married at First Sight Australia, Wild Isles, Dance 100, Tempting Fortune, Rise and Fall, Great Expectations and BBC News on an asteroid passing between the Earth and the Moon.
282	Episode 7	7 April 2023	4.09
Programmes Included: The Great Celebrity Bake Off for Stand Up To Cancer, Love Is Blind, The Dog Academy, ITV News on Donald Trump facing criminal charges, Beef, Outlast and Race Across the World.
283	Episode 8	14 April 2023	3.96
Programmes Included: In With a Shout, Gordon Ramsay's Future Food Stars, Rise and Fall, Last Woman on Earth with Sara Pascoe, Saving Our Wild Isles, Dr. Down Below and Obsession.
284	Episode 9	21 April 2023	4.05
Programmes Included: Family Fortunes, Inside the Factory, Scared of the Dark, Britain's Got Talent, The Great Stand Up to Cancer Bake Off, Love Is Blind, BBC News and Obsession.
285	Episode 10	28 April 2023	3.93
Programmes Included: I'm a Celebrity... South Africa, Absolutely Dyer: Danny and Dani Do Italy, Britain's Got Talent, Big Beasts, The Yorkshire Vet, Married at First Sight Australia, ITV News, Obsession.
286	Episode 11	5 May 2023	3.46
Programmes Included: Britain's Got Talent, The 1% Club, Celebrity Hunted, Reunion Hotel, I'm a Celebrity... South Africa, Canal Boat Diaries and Citadel.
287	Episode 12	12 May 2023	3.78
Programmes included: First Dates, The Greatest Auction, The Coronation of HM The King, The Coronation Concert, The 1% Club, BBC News and Made in Chelsea.
288	Episode 13	19 May 2023	3.85
Programmes included: Eurovision Song Contest 2023, I Kissed a Boy, Family Fortunes, The Big Celebrity Detox, ITV News, Citadel, The Greatest Auction and Open House: The Great Sex Experiment.
289	Episode 14	26 May 2023	3.90
Programmes included: Big Beasts, Alexander Armstrong in Sri Lanka, BBC News, Queer Eye, Casualty, Below Deck Sailing Yacht, FUBAR and Open House: The Great Sex Experiment.
290	Episode 15	2 June 2023	3.80
Programmes included: Britain's Got Talent, MerPeople, Sitting on a Fortune, James May: Oh Cook, The Greatest Auction, ITV News, Casualty and Top of the Pops 1994.
291	Episode 16 (Best Of Series 21)	9 June 2023	2.68

=== Celebrity Gogglebox Series 5 (2023) ===
No. overall	Episode	Original release date	UK viewers (millions)
29	Episode 1	16 June 2023	3.74
Programmes included: Five Star Kitchen: Britain’s Next Great Chef, Spy in the Ocean, The 1% Club, ITV News, Fake Profile, The Yorkshire Vet, This Morning.
30	Episode 2	23 June 2023	3.80
Programmes included: Countdown, Our Planet II, This Morning, The Greatest Auction, BBC News, Siren: Survive the Island and M3GAN.
31	Episode 3	30 June 2023	3.72
Programmes included: Antiques Roadshow, Puzzling, Hijack, A Wright Family Holiday, Below Deck Sailing Yacht, Cocaine Bear, Glastonbury Festival.
32	Episode 4	7 July 2023	3.47
Programmes included: Five Star Kitchen: Britain’s Next Great Chef, Is It Cake, Too?, Steph’s Packed Lunch, Magic Numbers: Hannah Fry’s Mysterious World of Maths, Dr. Pimple Popper, Saving Giraffes: The Long Journey Home, Hijack and ITV News.
33	Episode 5	14 July 2023	3.99
Programmes included: The Chase, Five Star Kitchen: Britain’s Next Great Chef, Sky Coppers, Jamie’s One-Pan Wonders, Mission: Impossible – Fallout, BBC News, 24 Hours in A&E.
34	Episode 6	21 July 2023	3.79
Programmes included: Only Connect, Too Hot to Handle, 90 Day Fiancé UK, The Proof Is Out There: Bermuda Triangle Edition, BBC News, The Deepest Breath and Smile.
–	Episode 7 (Best of 2023)	15 December 2023	N/A

=== Series 22 (2023-2024) ===
No. overall	Episode	Original release date	UK viewers (millions)
292	Episode 1	8 September 2023	3.66
Programmes included: Beat the Chasers, Top Guns: Inside the RAF, EastEnders, ITV News, The Yorkshire Vet, My Floating Home, Say Yes to the Dress with Tan France, Gordon, Gino and Fred: Viva España!.
293	Episode 2	15 September 2023	3.44
Programmes included: Marcus Wareing’s Tales from a Kitchen Garden, My Mum, Your Dad, Animals Up Close with Bertie Gregory, BBC News, This Morning, Love & Death, Welcome to Wrexham, Puzzling.
294	Episode 3	22 September 2023	3.60
Programmes included: Married at First Sight, This Morning, Celebrity Race Across the World, My Mum, Your Dad, Love & Death, BBC Breakfast, Alan Carr’s Picture Slam, Chris Packham: Is It Time to Break the Law?.
295	Episode 4	29 September 2023	3.74
Programmes included: Strictly Come Dancing, Celebrity SAS: Who Dares Wins, Blankety Blank, Ambulance, Sex Education, Celebrity Race Across the World, Love & Death, The Great British Bake Off.
296	Episode 5	6 October 2023	3.60
Programmes included: The Wheel, All Creatures Great and Small, Strictly Come Dancing, Help! My House Is Haunted, Sunday with Laura Kuenssberg, Boiling Point, Love Is Blind, BBC Breakfast.
297	Episode 6	13 October 2023	3.41
Programmes included: Don't Look Down for SU2C, Antiques Roadshow, Coronation Street, Big Little Journeys, Beat the Chasers, Big Brother, Sunday with Laura Kuenssberg.
298	Episode 7	20 October 2023	3.64
Programmes included: Nadiya's Simple Spices, Coronation Street, Married at First Sight, Welcome to Wrexham, Fletchers' Family Farm, Susan Calman's Grand Day Out, This Morning, The Good Ship Murder.
299	Episode 8	27 October 2023	3.41
Programmes included: Mamma Mia! I Have a Dream, Planet Earth III, BBC News, Crack Addicts, Uncanny, Surviving Paradise, BBC News, Celebrity Race Across the World.
300	Episode 9: Celebrity Special for SU2C	3 November 2023 (Note: Broadcast originally on 3 November in two parts, then added to VOD (outside the regular tab), then added to VOD as one episode (in the regular tab), then planned to broadcast as one episode on 14 November.)	(<2.79)
Programmes included: The Great British Bake Off, Made in Chelsea, Survivor, Harry’s Story: Stand Up to Cancer, Teen First Dates, Elizabeth’s Story: Stand Up to Cancer, No One Will Save You, Planet Earth III.
301	Episode 10	10 November 2023	3.77
Programmes included: Banged Up, Planet Earth III, The Curse of Robert the Doll, ITV News, The Great British Bake Off, Culprits, Little Trains & Big Names with Pete Waterman, ITV News.
302	Episode 11	17 November 2023	3.34
Programmes included: Survivor, ITV News, 007: Road to a Million, Shoplifters: Caught Red Handed, The Good Ship Murder, The Crown, ITV News.
303	Episode 12	24 November 2023	3.16
Programmes included: Deal or No Deal, Squid Game: The Challenge, Planet Earth III, Made in Chelsea, I'm a Celebrity…Get Me Out of Here!, Saving Lives at Sea, The Crown.
304	Episode 13	1 December 2023	3.07
Programmes included: Squid Game: The Challenge, Vinnie Jones In The Country, Survivor, ITV News, Tony Robinson's Marvellous Machines, Lorraine, The Couple Next Door.
305	Episode 14	8 December 2023	N/A
Programmes included: Strictly Come Dancing, Planet Earth III, Squid Game: The Challenge, Matt Baker: Travels with Mum & Dad, Jingle All the Way, The Couple Next Door, The Graham Norton Show.
–	Episode 15 (Best of 2023)	24 December 2023	<(2.64)
306	Episode 16 (Festive Special)	1 January 2024	<(3.15)
Programmes included: An Audience with Kylie, The 1% Club, Planet Earth III, The Real Full Monty: Jingle Balls, The Repair Shop, Men Up, Squid Game: The Challenge, Fur Babies, Mission: Impossible – Dead Reckoning Part One, Love Actually.

=== Series 23 (2024) ===
No. overall	Episode	Original release date	UK viewers (millions)
307	Episode 1	16 February 2024	3.45
308	Episode 2	23 February 2024	3.50
309	Episode 3	1 March 2024	3.30
310	Episode 4	8 March 2024	2.99
311	Episode 5	15 March 2024	3.06
312	Episode 6	22 March 2024	3.32
313	Episode 7	29 March 2024	3.43
314	Episode 8	5 April 2024	3.51
315	Episode 9	12 April 2024	3.50
316	Episode 10	19 April 2024	3.52
317	Episode 11	26 April 2024	3.59
318	Episode 12	3 May 2024	3.46
319	Episode 13	10 May 2024	3.31
320	Episode 14	17 May 2024	3.40
321	Episode 15	24 May 2024	3.40
322	Episode 16 (Best Of Series 23)	31 May 2024	1.86

=== Celebrity Gogglebox Series 6 (2024) ===
No. overall	Episode	Original release date	UK viewers (millions)
35	Episode 1	7 June 2024	2.94
Programmes included: The Nevermets, Insomnia, MILF Manor, In with a Shout, Canal Boat Diaries and BBC News (Trump).
36	Episode 2	14 June 2024	2.69
Programmes included: The Piano, Bridgerton, Celebrity Bridge of Lies, The Sky at Night, UK's Strongest Man 2024, The World's Most Luxurious Retirement Homes and Scam Interceptors.
37	Episode 3	21 June 2024	2.77
Programmes included: MILF Manor, Under Paris, Bake Off: The Professionals, The Supervet, Countdown and The Motorway Hotel.
38	Episode 4	28 June 2024	2.56
Programmes included: Top of the Pops 1992, The Nevermets, Beat the Chasers, Outrageous Homes, A Quiet Place and The UnXplained: Mysteries of the Universe.
39	Episode 5	5 July 2024	2.34
Programmes included: Love Island, Shania Twain at Glastonbury, The Nevermets, The Yorkshire Vet, This Morning (Cuddle Therapy) and ITV News (Biden v Trump).
40	Episode 6	12 July 2024	2.82
Programmes included: George Clarke's Amazing Spaces, 90 Day Fiancé UK, Swamp People: Serpent Invasion, The Mole, The Woman in Black, and the BBC's 2024 election coverage.

=== Series 24 (2024-2025) ===
No. overall	Episode	Original release date	UK viewers (millions)
323	Episode 1	13 September 2024	TBA
324	Episode 2	TBA	TBA
325	Episode 3	TBA	TBA
326	Episode 4	TBA	TBA
327	Episode 5	TBA	TBA
328	Episode 6	TBA	TBA
329	Celebrity SU2C	TBA	TBA
330	Episode 8	TBA	TBA
331	Episode 9	TBA	TBA
332	Episode 10	TBA	TBA
333	Episode 11	TBA	TBA
334	Episode 12	TBA	TBA
335	Episode 13	TBA	TBA
336	Episode 14	TBA	TBA
337	Episode 15	TBA	TBA
338	Episode 16	1 January 2025	TBA

=== Series 25 (2025) ===
No. overall	Episode	Original release date	UK viewers (millions)
339	Episode 1	14 February 2025	TBA
340	Episode 2	TBA	TBA
341	Episode 3	TBA	TBA
342	Episode 4	TBA	TBA
343	Episode 5	TBA	TBA
344	Episode 6	TBA	TBA
345	Episode 7	TBA	TBA
346	Episode 8	TBA	TBA
347	Episode 9	TBA	TBA
348	Episode 10	TBA	TBA
349	Episode 11	TBA	TBA
350	Episode 12	TBA	TBA
351	Episode 13	TBA	TBA
352	Episode 14	TBA	TBA
353	Episode 15	23 May 2025	TBA

=== Celebrity Gogglebox Series 7 (2025) ===
No. overall	Episode	Original release date	UK viewers (millions)
41	Episode 1	6 June 2025	TBA
TBA
42	Episode 2	TBA	TBA
TBA
43	Episode 3	TBA	TBA
TBA
44	Episode 4	TBA	TBA
TBA
45	Episode 5	TBA	TBA
TBA
46	Episode 6	TBA	TBA
TBA
47	Episode 7	11 July 2025	TBA
TBA

=== Series 26 (2025-2026) ===
No. overall	Episode	Original release date	UK viewers (millions)
354	Episode 1	6 February 2025	TBA
355	Episode 2	TBA	TBA
356	Episode 3	TBA	TBA
357	Episode 4	TBA	TBA
358	Episode 5	TBA	TBA
359	Episode 6	TBA	TBA
360	Episode 7	TBA	TBA
361	Episode 8	TBA	TBA
362	Episode 9	TBA	TBA
363	Episode 10	TBA	TBA
364	Episode 11	TBA	TBA
365	Episode 12	TBA	TBA
366	Episode 13	TBA	TBA
367	Episode 14	TBA	TBA
368	Celebrity Gogglebox for SU2C	TBA	TBA
369	Episode 16	TBA	TBA
370	Episode 17	1 January 2026	TBA

=== Series 27 (2026) ===
No. overall	Episode	Original release date	UK viewers (millions)
371	Episode 1	6 February 2026	TBA
372	Episode 2	TBA	TBA
373	Episode 3	TBA	TBA
374	Episode 4	TBA	TBA
375	Episode 5	TBA	TBA
376	Episode 6	TBA	TBA
377	Episode 7	TBA	TBA
378	Episode 8	TBA	TBA
379	Episode 9	TBA	TBA
380	Episode 10	TBA	TBA
381	Episode 11	TBA	TBA
382	Episode 12	TBA	TBA
383	Episode 13	TBA	TBA
384	Episode 14	TBA	TBA
385	Episode 15	TBA	TBA
386	Episode 16	22 May 2026	TBA

=== Celebrity Gogglebox Series 8 (2026) ===
No. overall	Episode	Original release date	UK viewers (millions)
48	Episode 1	5 June 2026	TBA
TBA
49	Episode 2	TBA	TBA
TBA
50	Episode 3	TBA	TBA
TBA
51	Episode 4	TBA	TBA
TBA
52	Episode 5	TBA	TBA
TBA
53	Episode 6	TBA	TBA
TBA
54	Episode 7	17 July 2026	TBA
TBA

=== Series 28 (2026-TBA) ===
No. overall	Episode	Original release date	UK viewers (millions)
387	Episode 1	4 September 2026	TBA
388	Episode 2	11 September 2026	TBA
389	Episode 3	18 September 2026	TBA
390	Episode 4	25 September 2026	TBA
391	Episode 5	2 October 2026	TBA
392	Episode 6	9 October 2026	TBA
393	Episode 7	16 October 2026	TBA
394	Gogglebox for SU2C	23 October 2026	TBA
Andy Burnham first prime minister on Gogglebox also staring David Tennant & Georgia Tennant.
395	Episode 9	30 October 2026	TBA
