= Romeo & Duet =

British television dating game show

- Genre: Dating game show
- Created by: David Baddiel; Ivor Baddiel
- Presented by: Oti Mabuse
- Country of origin: United Kingdom
- Original language: English
- No. of series: 1
- No. of episodes: 7

Production
- Production location: Dock10
- Running time: 60 minutes (inc. adverts)
- Production company: Goat Films

Original release
- Network: ITV
- Release: 16 April – 11 June 2022

Romeo & Duet is a British television dating game show that aired on ITV from 16 April to 11 June 2022 and is hosted by Oti Mabuse. It was cancelled after one series.

== Format ==
Singers have one song to entice a singleton (picker) down from a balcony and meet face-to-face. The newly formed couple will then head off on a duet-date to learn a duet, before returning later in the show to perform that number in a singing competition against the other couples. The studio audience then votes the winning couple for each episode. The prize is a Virgin Experience Day to go on another date.
