= Jamie's Quick & Easy Food =

2017 British cooking TV series

- Created by: Jamie Oliver Productions
- Starring: Jamie Oliver (host)
- Narrated by: Jamie Oliver
- Opening theme: Back to Life (However Do You Want Me) by Soul II Soul
- Country of origin: United Kingdom
- Original language: English
- No. of series: 4
- No. of episodes: 26

Production
- Running time: UK: half an hour (approx. 0:27 per episode)

Original release
- Network: Channel 4
- Release: 21 August 2017 – 17 July 2020

Jamie's Quick & Easy Food is a UK food lifestyle programme which has aired on Channel 4 since 2017. In each half-hour episode, host Jamie Oliver creates simple and delicious recipes using just five ingredients.

The show premiered on 21 August 2017. A tie-in book of recipes called 5 Ingredients - Quick & Easy Food, was released on 24 August 2017.

== Episodes ==
=== Series 1 (2017) ===
No. overall	No. in season	Title	Original release date
1–01	1	"Scallops, Steak, Flat Breads"	21 August 2017
Jamie cooks seared scallops with black pudding and speedy spuds and peas. Rib-eye steak; flat breads and mango chutney; and almond pastry puff.
1–02	2	"Tuna, Meatballs, Cookies"	28 August 2017
Jamie's Snappy Sesame Seared Tuna and Messy Meatball Buns. Chocolate Rye Cookies
1–03	3	"Chops, Linguine, Fishcakes"	4 September 2017
Asian fishcakes, lemony courgette linguine, sticky lamb chops and cherry chocolate mousse
1–04	4	"Lamb, Spaghetti, Apple Cookies"	11 September 2017
Jamie's lamb shoulder, super green spaghetti, one-pan fabulous fish and apple crumble cookies
1–05	5	"Beef, Crispy Squid, Polenta Cake"	18 September 2017
Jamie cooks up ginger shakin' beef, crispy squid and smashed avocado, pork and mash gratin, and almond, orange and polenta cake
1–06	6	"Pork Burger, Prawns, Gnocchi, Cheesecake"	25 September 2017
Jamie's crazy good pork burger, sticky mango prawns, rustic gnocchi and frozen banoffee cheesecake
1–07	7	"Chicken, Salad, Pasta, Shortbread"	2 October 2017
Tikka roast chicken, carrot and grain salad, crab spaghetti and chocolate orange shortbread
1–08	8	"Carbonara, Thai Chicken Soup, Omelette"	9 October 2017
Sausage carbonara, spicy one-pot red Thai chicken soup, scrambled egg omelette, and steamed pudding

=== Series 2 (2018) ===
No. overall	No. in season	Title	Original release date
2–01	9	"Sausage Bake, Pesto Chicken, 'Nduja"	21 May 2018
Jamie cooks up some flaky pastry pesto chicken, a tasty sausage bake, a spicy Italian pork 'nduja vongole, and a quick and easy watermelon granita
2–02	10	"Chicken Wings, Sirloin, Pasta, Ice Cream"	28 May 2018
Sticky kickin' chicken wings, a sizzling sirloin with awesome aubergines, creamy garlic mushroom pasta, and rum 'n' raisin ice cream
2–03	11	"Sea Bass, Chicken Surprise, Carpaccio"	4 June 2018
Thai-style crispy sea bass, baked garlicky mushrooms, a sweet chicken surprise, and pineapple carpaccio
2–04	12	"Beef, Saffron Rice, Plum Tarte Tatin"	11 June 2018
Meltin' mustardy beef that uses only five ingredients. Foolproof baked saffron rice, steamed salmon niçoise, and plum tarte tatin
2–05	13	"Chorizo Salmon, Lamb Hotpot, Affogato"	18 June 2018
Smoky chorizo salmon; potato and artichoke al forno; lovely lamb hotpot; and a Walnut-Whip affogato
2–06	14	"Egg Fried Rice, Beef Carpaccio, Fish Pie"	25 June 2018
Chickpea and chard pork. Egg fried rice; beef carpaccio with Egyptian spice; and simple fish pie
2–07	15	"Kofta, Salad, Chicken Satay, Alaska"	2 July 2018
Spicy lamb kofta flatbreads, a Spanish broad bean salad with manchego, peanut chicken satay, and peach and almond Alaska
2–08	16	"Stir Fry, Soup, Crispy Lemon Sole"	9 July 2018
Chicken noodle stir fry, a rustic tomato soup, a crispy-skin lemon sole, and a honey berry filo pudding

=== Series 3 (2019) ===
No. overall	No. in season	Title	Original release date
3–01	17	"Pork, Meringue, Harissa Chicken"	5 April 2019
Jamie cooks up some super-fast peachy pork chops, an easy berry meringue ripple pudding, and a quick spicy and sticky harissa chicken traybake
3–02	18	"Cod, Asian Eggs, Chicken, Rice Pudding"	12 April 2019
Smoky pancetta cod, Asian fried eggs, crispy garlicky chicken and an easy mango rice pudding
3–03	19	"Steak Stir Fry, Watermelon, Mussels"	19 April 2019
Quick-style steak stir-fry, watermelon, radish and feta salad, creamy Cornish mussels, and boozy pears & chocolate pudding
3–04	20	"Lamb, Pasta, Chicken, Spinach Curry"	26 April 2019
Lamb, pesto peas & potatoes. pear & gorgonzola farfalle, sticky hoisin chicken, and a speedy spinach curry
3–05	21	"Asian Tuna Salad, Lamb, Chicken Noodles"	3 May 2019
Asian tuna steak salad; a hearty ale barley lamb shank; a quick sweet and sour chicken noodles; and a revamped duck and orange salad
3–06	22	"Beef, Pasta, Prawn Soup"	10 May 2019
Italian seared beef, aubergine arrabiata, dressed beets and a speedy spiced prawn soup

=== Series 4 (2020) ===
No. overall	No. in season	Title	Original release date
4–01	23	"Curry, Prawn Pasta, Squash, Flapjacks"	26 June 2020
Jamie rustles up a deliciously foolproof aromatic lamb curry, a simple harissa squash salad, tasty rosé pesto prawn pasta and fast flapjack biscuits
4–02	24	"Pasta, Teriyaki Aubergine, Spicy Beef"	3 July 2020
tuna pasta, sticky teriyaki aubergine, spicy beef and cauliflower rice, and asparagus and eggs
4–03	25	"Pasta, Sausage Bake, Cherry Chard Rice"	10 July 2020
Hot smoked salmon pasta, whole roast cauliflower, sausage and apple bake, and cherry chard rice
4–04	26	"Lamb Stew, Lentil Salad, Liver, Noodles"	17 July 2020
Lamb stew, warm lentil salad. A speedy classic - liver, bacon and onions. Final dish is black tahini noodles
