= Life Story (TV series) =

- Series title card from BBC broadcast
- Genre: Nature documentary
- Narrated by: David Attenborough
- Composer: Murray Gold
- Country of origin: United Kingdom
- Original language: English
- No. of episodes: 6

Production
- Executive producer: Mike Gunton
- Running time: 60 minutes
- Production company: BBC Natural History Unit

Original release
- Network: BBC One; BBC One HD
- Release: 23 October – 27 November 2014

Life Story is a British natural-history television series co-produced by the BBC Natural History Unit, Discovery Channel and France Télévisions in association with The Open University. The six-part series, narrated by David Attenborough, reveals the challenges faced by individual animals at different stages of their lives.

== Production ==
The series was announced by the BBC on 8 July 2011 with the working title Survival, later changed to Life Story. As with other BBC Natural History Unit productions, Life Story was a co-production between BBC Television, Discovery Channel, France Télévisions and Open University, who each contributed to the documentary's funding, and is the first Natural History Unit series to film using ultra high-definition 4K cameras. The series was marketed by BBC Worldwide at the BBC Worldwide Showcase event in 2014.

The series has been produced with extensive use of surround sound effects, and with out-of-frame sounds changing with each change of shot; something that is often minimised to avoid distraction but which works well on wildlife material. It is currently broadcast with Dolby 5.1 surround on Freesat.

== Broadcast ==
=== British television ===
Life Story's world premiere took place at Bristol's Cinema de Lux on 14 October 2014, to coincide with the BBC's 80th anniversary in the city. The television broadcast began on 23 October 2014 on BBC One and BBC One HD. The UK broadcast consisted of six episodes, each of which included a 10-minute making-of documentary called Life Story Diaries.

=== International ===
The series was mainly broadcast internationally on BBC Earth channel, with a few exceptions for some countries.

In Canada, Canadian Broadcasting Corporation aired the series on CBC-TV from 11 January 2015.

On 6 June 2015, the series began its run on American television on the Discovery network, premiering on the Discovery Channel, and retained David Attenborough's narration from the original British television broadcasts.

== Episodes ==
No.	Title	Original release date	UK viewers (millions)
1	"First Steps"	23 October 2014	5.12 million viewers
David Attenborough introduces the series from South Africa, where he watches meerkat pups emerging from their burrows. The programme documents some of the threats faced by animals at the beginning of their lives. In Greenland, young barnacle geese face a perilous start in life. The parents coax their five goslings to jump from the nest, perched on the edge of a 400-foot cliff face. Their survival depends on luck and a good jumping technique. Baby humpback whales must grow quickly to build strength for a long migration, but when a group of over-eager males chase a female, her calf is pushed to exhaustion. Later, the mother seeks the help of a lone male whale to protect her weakened calf from sharks, behaviour never filmed before. In New Zealand, another new discovery is revealed. Young fur seals, instead of heading to the ocean where predatory killer whales await, swim up a rainforest stream to a secluded pool where they play, train and gain strength together. The challenges facing young lions, orchid mantids, jerboas and black-footed albatross are also shown. Life Story Diaries features the Greenland shoot and the difficult scenes witnessed by the film crew.
2	"Growing Up"	30 October 2014	4.65 million viewers
This episode focuses on the challenges faced by young animals as they gain independence. A juvenile Arctic fox is shown attempting to catch lemmings by snow diving, a skill it must master if it is to make it through the winter. In India, three adolescent tiger cubs rely on the provision of their mother and the protection of their father, but when independence is forced upon the youngsters early, there are dramatic consequences for one overconfident cub. Young satin bowerbirds in Australia and striated caracaras on the Falkland Islands must overcome the challenges presented by adults of their own kind, while a lone veined octopus must use its ingenuity to protect itself from a pursuing flounder. Two newly independent cheetah sisters struggle to make their first big game kill, but when an opportunity arises they work together in order to successfully capture a male impala. As a racket-tailed hummingbird enters adulthood, it must quickly adapt to an exhaustive daily schedule in order to survive. The many challenges faced by hummingbirds in the cloud forests of Peru are filmed in intricate detail. Life Story Diaries follows the team's two-and-a-half-year quest to capture footage of young Arctic foxes snow diving for lemmings.
3	"Home"	6 November 2014	4.41 million viewers
This programme shows how animals go about establishing, using and defending a home. On the plains of Zambia, a pack of African wild dogs use their territory to raise young, face off competitors and hunt wildebeest. For a hermit crab, home is the shell on its back. When an empty seashell washes ashore on a tropical beach, it sets off a chain of house swaps amongst the local crab population. Australian weaver ants use their silk-spinning larvae as 'glue guns' to bind together their leaf nests, which they defend from a marauding neighbouring colony. In the Rocky Mountains, mountain goats descend from the high peaks in spring, braving river crossings and grizzly bears on an annual pilgrimage to a place where they can take in vital minerals. Meanwhile, pikas engage in a race against time – and a few underhand tactics – to build a stockpile of food during the short summer season. In Senegal, a chimpanzee troop relies on detailed knowledge of their territory to endure a drought. The elders lead the troop to a dry river bed where water still flows beneath the surface. Life Story Diaries reveals how the Zambia crew obtained rare footage of a complete wild dog hunt.
4	"Power"	13 November 2014	N/A
The fourth stage of life's journey is for animals to gain power and the privileges it brings: enhanced social status and a better chance of siring offspring. The programme follows the struggles of an orphaned chimpanzee. At first ostracised by his elders, he later gains a friend and learns a valuable spear-hunting technique, gaining him access to females in the troop. Young archerfish learn their hunting skills by imitating their larger, more successful peers, but may still lose their prey to bullying adults. The same fate befalls a young Alaskan bald eagle, but when the thieving adult bird is forced to defend its bounty from rival eagles, she reclaims her meal. Meerkats learn the value of teamwork when facing down a cobra, but for honey ants, teamwork turns to treason as worker ants kill all but one of the queens that had worked together to dig the burrow for their colony. Some animals employ aggression as the best strategy to gain power, illustrated by the brutal boxing matches of male kangaroos and the jousting of sharp-tailed grouse. Life Story Diaries features the Senegal chimpanzee shoot, where the crew spent 700 hours with the troop to film the spear-hunting behaviour.
5	"Courtship"	20 November 2014	N/A
The competition to breed has created both the most extraordinary beauty and the most violent battles seen in nature. Waved albatross pair for life and spend hours canoodling with each other. But for a male peacock jumping spider, one wrong move in his dazzling courtship routine may well prove fatal. A male flame bowerbird creates a stick sculpture decorated with shells and berries to impress a mate. Even that isn't enough. He then uses it as a backdrop to show off his vivid colours in a dazzling dance. But things don't go to plan as his bower is destroyed by mischievous youngsters and a rival male. But the most extraordinary display of all is created by a tiny, drab male puffer fish. He builds a spectacular submarine 'crop circle' in the sand. It's the most perfect and complex structure created by any animal. The crop circles were only discovered in southern Japan in 1995 and the fish architect was only identified in 2011.
6	"Parenthood"	27 November 2014	N/A
In the final episode of Life Story, animals attempt to rear their offspring. This takes extraordinary commitment, and a parent may even need to risk its own life for its offspring. A mother bonobo chimpanzee lavishes care on her son for five years, deep in the Congo forest. Their bond will endure for the rest of her life. She will teach him how to survive in the jungle. One of her most important lessons is showing him a hidden forest pool where they harvest lilies rich in minerals essential for their good health. A female turtle, returning to the island where she was born 30 years ago, hauls herself up the beach to lay her eggs in a safe place above the tide line. But her commitment may prove her undoing. The low tide traps her on the island behind a wall of coral. If she cannot climb over it the heat of the sun will kill her. A mother zebra must decide where to lead her young foal across the Mara River so that they can reach new grazing grounds. Should she cross where they will face predators such as crocodiles? Or should she lead her foal through treacherous rapids? Her foal's life may rest on the decision she makes. In a touching scene, elephants delicately stroke the bones of an ancestor. We cannot know what they are thinking, but perhaps like humans they have a sense of a shared history? It is a communal experience that appears to draw the family members closer together.
-	"The Full Circle"	1 January 2015	N/A
In this highlights programme compiled from the recent Life Story series, David Attenborough brings us the universal story that unites each of us with every animal on the planet, the story of the greatest of all adventures - the journey through life. For each stage of life we see the most spectacular, beautiful or dramatic stories from the Life Story series. The journey begins with one of the most talked-about sequences - flightless barnacle goose chicks making an extraordinary leap down a cliff face from the ledge where they hatched. Newly independent Arctic foxes travel great distances across the frozen, northern landscape, learning how to catch prey. They leap high into the air and plunge nose-first into the snow to catch the lemmings living underneath. In pursuit of a home, tropical hermit crabs do something seen nowhere else in nature. In meerkat society, a youngster must quickly learn how to defend home and family from snakes. In a spectacular showdown between the meerkat clan and a venomous cobra, the youngsters learn a vital life lesson. In a sequence that has since gone viral across the globe, a tiny, drab male puffer fish creates the most complex and beautiful structure made by any animal on earth. He builds a spectacular submarine 'crop circle' in the sand to attract a female's attention. Parenthood for a mother zebra involves a life-and-death choice on where to cross the river during migration. In a touching final scene, elephants delicately stroke the bones of an ancestor.

== Merchandise ==
=== DVD and Blu-ray ===
The series was released in the UK as Region 2, two-disc DVD (BBCDVD3981) and Blu-ray (BBCBD0281) box sets by BBC Worldwide on 1 December 2014.

In United States, both DVD and Blu-ray were released on 29 March 2016 by Warner Home Video. As for Canada, both DVD and Blu-ray Disc were released under Bilingual Edition on 10 November 2015.

In Australia and New Zealand, DVD and Blu-ray were released by ABC DVD/Village Roadshow on 8 October 2015.

=== Books ===
In the United Kingdom, an accompanying hardcover format was written by Mike Gunton and Rupert Barrington. It was released on 9 October 2014 and published by BBC Books (ISBN 9781849906647).
