= I Can See Your Voice (British game show) =

British television game show

- Genre: Game show
- Based on: I Can See Your Voice by CJ ENM
- Written by: David Reilly
- Directed by: Meyrick Cook; Julia Knowles; Sam Nutt; Peter Oliver
- Creative director: Elizabeth Honan
- Presented by: Paddy McGuinness
- Starring: Alison Hammond; Jimmy Carr; Amanda Holden
- Country of origin: United Kingdom
- Original language: English
- No. of series: 2
- No. of episodes: Regular: 16; Special: 1; Overall: 17

Production
- Executive producers: Rachel Ashdown; Amelia Brown; Louise Hutchinson; Tom O'Brien
- Producers: Hally Booth; Meyrick Cook; Phoebe Janner; Sarah Mittell; Sam Nutt; Peter Oliver
- Editors: Alistair Knapp; Chris Lewis; Matthew Pratt
- Camera setup: Multi-camera
- Production companies: Naked (2021); Thames

Original release
- Network: BBC One
- Release: 10 April 2021 – 24 December 2022

Related
- I Can See Your Voice franchise

I Can See Your Voice is a British television mystery music game show based on the South Korean programme of the same title, featuring its format where a guest artist and contestants attempt to eliminate bad singers from the group, until the last mystery singer remains for a duet performance. It first aired on BBC One on 10 April 2021.

== Gameplay ==
=== Format ===
Over the course of four rounds, the guest artist and a pair of contestants must attempt to eliminate bad singers from a group of six "mystery singers", identified only by their occupation or alias, without ever hearing them perform live. They are assisted by clues regarding the singers' backgrounds, style of performance, and observations from a celebrity panel. At the end of a game, the last remaining mystery singer is revealed as either good or bad by means of a duet between them and one of the guest artists.

If the last remaining mystery singer is good, the contestants win £10,000; this is also applied to the winning bad singer selected by them.

=== Rounds ===
==== Visual round ====
- First Impressions

s1: The guest artist and contestants are given some time to observe and examine each mystery singer based on their appearance.

==== Lip sync round ====
- Lip Sync Challenge

s1–2: Each mystery singer performs a lip sync to a song; good singers mime to a recording of their own, while bad singers mime to a backing track by another vocalist.

==== Evidence rounds ====
- Unlock my Life

s1–2: The guest artist and contestants are presented with a video package chronicling the daily lives by one of the mystery singers.

- Home Truths

s2: The guest artist and contestants "tour" one of the remaining mystery singer's homes for clues (which may include red herrings) for 60 seconds.

==== Interrogation round ====
- Interrogation

s1–2: The guest artist and contestants must choose one mystery singer to question with. The host is given a list of 15 questions shown on the screen and the artist can ask any of 15 questions within the 30 second time limit.

== Production ==
CJ ENM provisionally announced a British adaptation of I Can See Your Voice through a press release during (South Korean) sixth season of the same title in March 2019; this was subsequently confirmed by the BBC in July 2020, with Fremantle's units Naked and Thames, co-assigning on production duties.

== Broadcast history ==
I Can See Your Voice debuted on 10 April 2021, with filming taking place at The Maidstone Studios. At the time of production during the COVID-19 pandemic, health and safety protocols had also implemented. Being as part of its first series, Leona Lewis and contestant Gabby Logan played in a holiday special that concluded on the Christmas Eve of 2021. Two weeks before first series finale, the BBC has already renewed the show for a second series, which premiered on 15 October 2022.

In February 2023, the BBC formally announced to discontinue the show after airing two series.

=== Children in Need mini-segment ===
During the 42nd appeal show of the Children in Need charity broadcast held at Dock10 in Salford, Greater Manchester on 19 November 2021, a mini-segment of I Can See Your Voice featured newsreader Kate Silverton, Final Score host Jason Mohammad, and BBC Breakfast presenter (also bad singer) Mike Bushell portraying as mystery singers.

== Series overview ==
Series	Episodes	Originally released		Good singers	Bad singers
Series	Episodes	First released	Last released	Good singers	Bad singers
1	8	10 April 2021	29 May 2021	6	2
2	8	15 October 2022	24 December 2022	4	4
Special		24 December 2021		1	0

== Episodes ==
=== Series 1 (2021) ===
List of series 1 episodes
No. overall	No. in series	Guest artist(s)	Player order (Note: It refers to the guest artist(s) that have played in according to their first game; returning guest artists (which also include foreigners or former good singers, with their names displaying in italics) are not counted.)	Contestants	Original release date	U.K. viewers (millions)	U.K. share (national)
1	1	Danny Jones (McFly)	1	Lee and John	10 April 2021	3.29	17%
2	2	Nadine Coyle (Girls Aloud)	2	Jen and Nadine	17 April 2021	3.822	22.3%
3	3	Ronan Keating (Boyzone) (Note: Foreign guest artist: Ireland — Ronan Keating (Boyzone))	3	Saaj and Sash	24 April 2021	3.578	23.6%
4	4	Fleur East	4	Anton and Duban	1 May 2021	3.436	21.7%
5	5	Louise Redknapp (Eternal)	5	Billy and Leanne Murphy	8 May 2021	3.538	20.5%
6	6	Heather Small (M People)	6	Kristen and Caitlin	15 May 2021	4.8	27.8%
7	7	Alexandra Burke	7	Daniel and Joe	22 May 2021	3.84	26%
8	8	Ricky Wilson (Kaiser Chiefs)	8	Sophie Carrigill and Josh Landmann	29 May 2021	NR	NR

=== Series 2 (2022) ===
List of series 2 episodes
No. overall	No. in series	Guest artist(s)	Player order	Contestants	Original release date	U.K. viewers (millions)	U.K. share (national)
9	1	Tony Hadley (Spandau Ballet)	10	Glenda and Paul	15 October 2022	NR	NR
10	2	Alexandra Burke	—	Charlie and Dexter	22 October 2022	3.015	18.8%
11	3	Becky Hill	11	Heather and Kaveh	29 October 2022	4.57	24.6%
12	4	Lulu	12	Haloo and Zanist	5 November 2022	3.788	26.4%
13	5	Claire Richards (Steps)	13	Essylne and Nkechi	26 November 2022	3.652	19.8%
14	6	Andy Bell (Erasure)	14	Dominique and Tahiela	3 December 2022	2.71	19.1%
15	7	Simon Webbe (Blue)	15	Tracy and Michelle	10 December 2022	NR	NR
16	8	Layton Williams	16	Maryanne and Chloe	24 December 2022	NR	NR

=== Special ===
No.	Title	Guest artist(s)	Player order	Contestants	Original release date	U.K. viewers (millions)	U.K. share (national)
1	"Holiday special"	Leona Lewis	9	Gabby Logan and Dev	24 December 2021	NR	NR

== Accolades ==
Event	Year (Note: Indicates the year of ceremony)	Category	Nominee(s)	Result	Ref(s)
BAFTA Awards	2022	Best Entertainment Performance	Alison Hammond	Nominated	
Entertainment Daily Awards	2022	Favourite Entertainment Show	I Can See Your Voice	Nominated	
National Television Awards	2022	Best TV Presenter	Paddy McGuiness	Longlisted	
National Television Awards	2022	The Sir Bruce Forsyth Entertainment Award	I Can See Your Voice	Longlisted	
TVTimes Awards	2021	Favourite Entertainment Show	I Can See Your Voice	Nominated	
TRIC Awards	2022	Best Reality TV Programme	I Can See Your Voice	Longlisted	
