= This Is My House (TV series) =

British game show

- Created by: Richard Bacon; Nick Weidenfeld
- Presented by: Stacey Dooley (series 1)
- Narrated by: Sophie Willan (series 2)
- Country of origin: United Kingdom
- Original language: English
- No. of seasons: 2
- No. of episodes: 18

Production
- Production company: Expectation Entertainment

Original release
- Network: BBC One
- Release: 24 March 2021 – 8 July 2022

This Is My House is a British game show created by Richard Bacon and Nick Weidenfeld, which first aired on BBC One on 24 March 2021. The first series was presented by Stacey Dooley. The second series had no presenter instead being narrated by Sophie Willan.

Each episode sees four contestants (the homeowner and three imposters) attempting to convince a panel of celebrities that they are the real owner of a house.

For Red Nose Day 2022, Ricky Hatton, Claire Richards, Deborah Meaden, and Robert Rinder took part in a one-off celebrity special.

== Critical reception ==
In a review in The Guardian, Lucy Mangan awarded the opening episode five stars out of five, calling it "all the best bits of Big Brother, Through the Keyhole and Would I Lie to You?, with a large dash of subjective Guess Who? thrown in."

== International versions ==
An Italian version, Questa è casa mia!, aired on Real Time in 2022.
