= Celebrity doctor =

Physicians with extensive media exposure

Celebrity doctors include physicians, medical professionals, people with the title doctor, and some with the nickname "doctor" who have substantial media exposure. Some may have a secondary role as an entertainer, particularly in the United States and United Kingdom. Examples of celebrity doctors include Dr. Drew, Dr. Oz, Dr. Ruth, and Dr. Phil among others.

== Media exposure ==
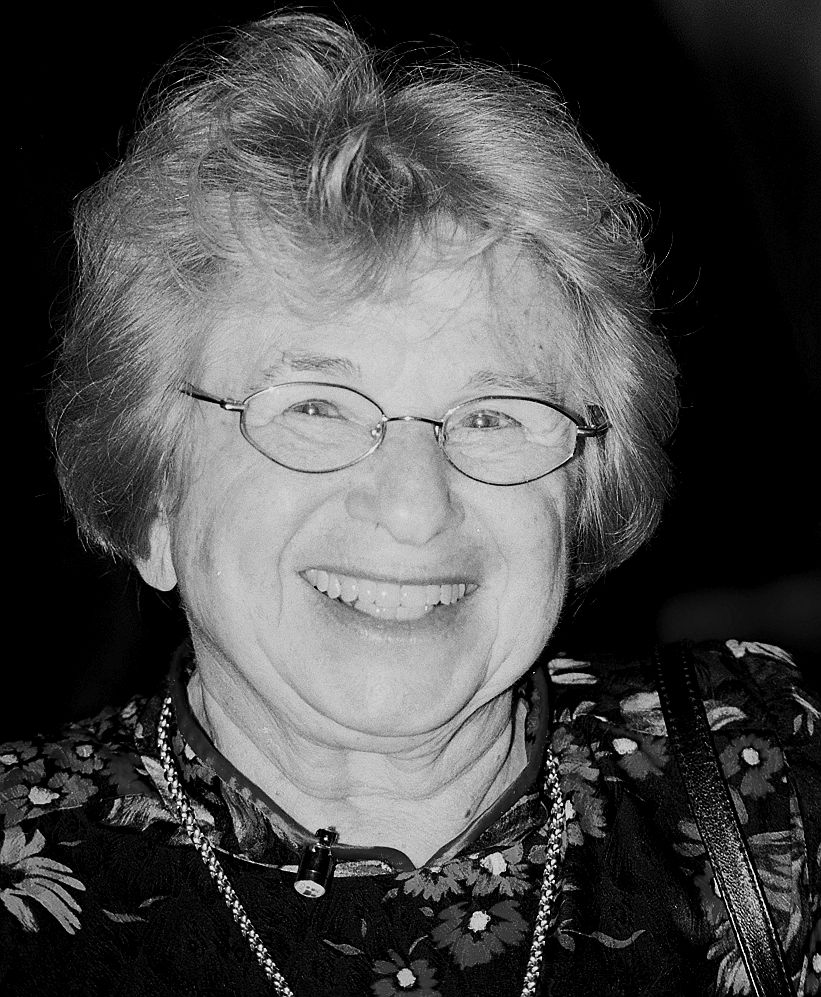
Dr. Ruth Westheimer

A "celebrity doctor" is a medical professional noted for appearances on television, the internet and social media, books, and speaking engagements. For many years, doctors such as Everett Koop, Benjamin Spock, and Ruth Westheimer (Dr. Ruth) gave advice on the radio, on television, and in books. With the growth of the internet and social media, medical professionals had more places to reach the public, especially with messages alternative to mainstream medical advice.

Celebrity doctors are part of a "healthcare–media complex" that constantly seeks new attention of consumers in the 24-hour news cycle with catchy content about health in order to achieve and maintain high ratings. There is a conflict between their roles and responsibilities as medical doctors, and their roles as business people and entertainers.

Consumers generally trust that the content they receive from celebrity doctors is valid due to their credentials and their fame. Content may be exaggerated and simplified by the need to gain and keep the public's attention, and is often general and may not be applicable to an individual receiving the content. The problem of conflicts of interest becomes especially acute if a celebrity doctor endorses some specific product or approach to health when they deliver content about health, and also sells related products.

In The BMJ's Christmas 2014 edition, a study determined that for the TV show The Doctors, "evidence supported 63%, contradicted 14%, and was not found for 24%" of recommendations made by the panel of doctors, and for The Dr. Oz Show, "evidence supported 46%, contradicted 15%, and was not found for 39%" of his recommendations; the study also said that "the public should be skeptical about recommendations made on medical talk shows."

== List of celebrity doctors ==
- Robert Atkins and Arthur Agatston are examples of celebrity doctors who have created and promoted fad diets
- Deepak Chopra
- Henry Heimlich
- Palaniappan Manickam a.k.a. Dr. Pal
- Ginni Mansberg
- Phil McGraw a.k.a. Dr. Phil (though he does not have a medical license)
- Mehmet Oz
- David Perlmutter
- Drew Pinsky
- Andrew Weil
- Eriko Wakisaka
- Hayden Kho
- Nandipha Magudumana

=== Reality TV ===
- Several doctors from the U.K. have presented on the medical reality television show Embarrassing Bodies (which has been praised for its service to public health) and become celebrities, including Pixie McKenna, Dawn Harper, and Christian Jessen.
