= 1001 Things You Should Know =

British TV-show that aired on Channel 4

- Genre: Game show
- Created by: Beth Davies; Gail Harman; Martin Lau; Joe McVey; Daniel Twist
- Directed by: John L. Spencer
- Presented by: Sandi Toksvig
- Theme music composer: Rage Music
- Country of origin: United Kingdom
- Original language: English
- No. of series: 2
- No. of episodes: 60

Production
- Executive producers: Suzy Lamb; Sarah Woolley
- Producer: Louise Smith
- Production location: BBC Pacific Quay
- Editors: Tim Daish; Neil Patience; Robin Stokes
- Camera setup: Multiple-camera setup
- Running time: 30 minutes (inc. adverts)
- Production company: Thames Scotland

Original release
- Network: Channel 4
- Release: 12 November 2012 – 31 May 2013

1001 Things You Should Know is a British game show that aired on Channel 4 from 12 November 2012 to 31 May 2013 and hosted by Sandi Toksvig.

== Format ==
Three contestants compete in each show. They are offered a choice of 12 categories, and in each category, an expert (either a celebrity from a Channel 4 show or just a field expert) asks them a question, the answer of which it is thought people 'should know'. There is no prize money awarded for answering this question correctly, but the contestant can then answer a (harder) related cash question for money. Wrong answers lock a contestant out of the game, and the question is open to 'steals'.

In round one, correct answers to the cash question are worth £100. In round two, with fewer categories left to choose from, correct answers are worth £300, whilst in round three they are worth £601.

The categories include: Film, Geography, Music, Celebrity, Sport, Art, Food & Drink, History, Television, Human Body, Science, Nature, Maths, Politics, Animals and Mystery. (The Mystery category is the only category that appears on every show.)

== Final round ==
The final round involves the three categories the contestants have thus far avoided, and the player in the lead gets the first choice of category. The player in 3rd place answers first, and must correctly answer 2 questions, the first of which is the one they should know. An incorrect answer to either puts them out of the game. However, if the leading player gets both questions correctly, they'll automatically win the game even if other players have also answered correctly. If no-one answers both questions correctly in the final round, then, there is no returning champion, and 3 new contestants will compete in the next show instead.

In Series 2, this was altered, as instead of all 3 contestants picking their categories, only the person who banked the most money picks which category everybody gets.

The winner of the game gets the chance to answer a single question in order to win the entire prize pot built up by the 3 contestants. If this question is not answered correctly, the prize pot rolls over to the next show. The champion from each show returns for the following show to compete against two new contestants, regardless of whether they win the jackpot or not.

== Category Experts ==
=== Series 1 ===
Category	Experts
Animals	Adrian Hallgarth (A falconer), Mark Evans, Ian Turner (Deputy Head Warden at Longleat Safari Park)
Art	Lord Bath, Celia Sawyer, Gordon Watson (Four Rooms)
Celebrity	Max Clifford, Jameela Jamil, Ollie Locke (Made in Chelsea)
Film	Wendy Cook (Works at Hyde Park Picture House, Leeds), Karen Krizanovich (Film critic), Oliver Phelps
Food & Drink	Simon Rimmer,(Sunday Brunch) Tom & Henry (The Fabulous Baker Brothers), Simon Baggs (A farmer), Sue Lawrence
Geography	Jasmine Harman,(A Place in the Sun) Brendan Sheerin,(Coach Trip) David West (Seaplane pilot)
History	Tony Robinson,(Time Team) Dr Christopher Mason (Historian), Phil Harding, Jonathan Brown (Works at Edinburgh Castle), James McSherry (Works at Imperial War Museum North), Tessa Dunlop
Human Body	Dr Dawn Harper, Gemma Raby (One Born Every Minute), Dr Christian Jessen
Literature	Gavin Pilgrim (Owner of London's oldest book shop), Cecelia Ahern, Susie Dent,(Countdown) Laila Rouass
Maths	Rachel Riley,(Countdown) David Fishwick (Founder of Bank on Dave!)
Music	Sara Cox, Russell Watson, Starboy Nathan, Nicola Benedetti
Mystery	Kevin McCloud,(Grand Designs) Laila Rouass, Tim Lovejoy,(Sunday Brunch) Nick Hewer,(Countdown) Iain Logie Baird (Works at the National Media Museum), Dr Tim O'Brien (Astrophysicist), Angela Saini, Tony Robinson, Ollie Locke (Made in Chelsea)
Nature	Adrian Hallgarth (A falconer), Simon Watt (Inside Nature's Giants)
Politics	Cathy Newman (Channel 4 News), Neil Kinnock, Jon Snow
Science	Angela Saini, Dr Jimmy Nicholson (Educating Essex), Dr Tim O'Brien (Astrophysicist), Dr James Logan (Embarrassing Bodies), Dr Christian Jessen
Sport	John McCririck, Gareth Thomas, Ade Adepitan, Maxine McCarthy (Boxer)
Television	Jennifer Metcalfe,(Hollyoaks) Javone Prince, Kay Mellor

=== Series 2 ===
Category	Experts
Books	Cecelia Ahern, Benjamin Zephaniah, Barbara Taylor Bradford
Celebrity	Jamie Laing (Made in Chelsea), Jameela Jamil
Film	Karen Krizanovich (Film critic), Brian Cox, Oliver Phelps, Jenny Beavan
Food & Drink	Simon Rimmer, Tom & Henry (The Fabulous Baker Brothers), Lisa Faulkner, Hero Hirsh (Cheesemonger of the Year at the World Cheese Awards), Luigi Corvi (Owner of Glasgow's Oldest Fish and chips Shop)
Geography	Brendan Sheerin, Liam Dutton (Channel 4 News Weather Forecaster), Jasmine Harman
History	Phil Harding, Tony Robinson, Jonathan Ferguson (Curator at Royal Armouries Museum), Dr Christopher Mason (Historian)
Music	Frankie Sandford, Una Healy & Mollie King of The Saturdays, Lawson, Nicky Byrne, Peter Oundjian
Mystery	Sarah Beeny, Anita Rani, Amanda Lamb, David Fishwick (Founder of Bank on Dave!)
Nature	Garth de Jong (Works at Dublin Zoo), James Scott (Works at Sea Life), Sally Eaton (Lichenologist at Royal Botanic Garden Edinburgh)
Politics	Cathy Newman, Jon Snow, Ann Widdecombe
Science	Dr Dawn Harper, Lesley Gilchrist (One Born Every Minute), Dr James Logan (Embarrassing Bodies), Dr Robin Hoyle (Director of Science at Glasgow Science Centre)
Sport	Louis Smith, Nicola Adams, Dame Sarah Storey, Martin Offiah
Television	Jennifer Metcalfe & Nick Pickard, Tim Lovejoy, Sharon Rooney (My Mad Fat Diary), Javone Prince

== Transmissions ==
Series	Start date	End date	Episodes
1	12 November 2012	21 December 2012	30
2	22 April 2013	31 May 2013	30
