= Stand Up to Cancer (UK) =

- Genre: Charity telethon
- Presented by: Alan Carr (2012–present); Davina McCall (2012–16, 2021); Christian Jessen (2012–14); Adam Hills (2014–present); Maya Jama (2018–present)
- Country of origin: United Kingdom
- Original language: English
- No. of episodes: 4 telethons

Original release
- Network: Channel 4
- Release: 19 October 2012 – present

Stand Up to Cancer (SU2C) is the British version of Stand Up to Cancer, an American charitable television telethon, broadcast between 2012 and 2018 on the Channel 4 network in the United Kingdom, and again from 2020. The most recent edition of the telethon was on 15 October 2021, a programme which was hosted by Davina McCall, Alan Carr, Maya Jama and Adam Hills. By February 2015, the 2014 broadcast had raised £15,585,444 in pledges, in aid of cancer research.

== History ==
SU2C was formally launched on 27 May 2008 in the United States by Entertainment Industry Foundation (EIF) and aims to raise significant funds for cancer research through online and televised efforts. The American programme is a telethon, where three of the major broadcast networks (ABC, NBC, CBS) broadcast to over 170 countries on 5 September 2008, raising over $100 million after that evening's broadcast.

Three further telethons have been broadcast in USA on 10 September 2010, 7 September 2012 and 5 September 2014, and were made available to more than 190 countries. To date, more than $261 million has been pledged to support SU2C's innovative cancer research programs. and 2014. Current members of the SU2C Council of Founders and Advisors (CFA) include Katie Couric, Sherry Lansing, Kathleen Lobb, Lisa Paulsen, Rusty Robertson, Sue Schwartz, Pamela Oas Williams, and Ellen Ziffren. All current members of the CFA were co-producers of the 2012 televised special. The late co-founder Laura Ziskin executive produced both the 5 September 2008 and 10 September 2010 broadcasts.

=== British launch ===
In August 2012, Channel 4 and the British cancer charity Cancer Research UK joined forces to launch a British version of ‘Stand Up To Cancer'. This consisted of a season of factual, entertainment and health programming building up to a live telethon event on Friday 19 October 2012.

Jay Hunt, Chief Creative Officer of Channel 4, says: "Sadly most of us - more than 1 in 3 - will be touched by cancer at some point in our lives. Stand Up To Cancer is about doing what Channel 4 does best - focusing attention on an important issue using entertainment and comedy. We hope to raise vital funds for trials that could save lives." Dr Harpal Kumar, Cancer Research UK's chief executive, says: "We want everyone in the UK to unite and stand up to this devastating disease. We've made incredible progress in the last 40 years but there's so much more to do. It's not just technology or knowledge that we need to win our fight to beat cancer - it's funding - and every pound we raise is a step closer to achieving our goal to beat this disease. We are entering the ‘golden age' of cancer research - but each and every one of us can stand up and make a difference right now to come together to raise vital funds for clinical research, accelerate progress and ultimately save more lives."

== Telethons ==
=== Overview ===
No.	Broadcast date	Broadcast total	Total raised	Presenters	Channel 4 rating (millions) (on average)
1	19 October 2012	£6,483,995	£8,011,722.62	Davina McCall, Alan Carr and Christian Jessen	1.2
2	17 October 2014	£14,515,243	£15,585,444	Davina McCall, Alan Carr and Christian Jessen with Adam Hills	2.13
3	21 October 2016	£15,560,519	£15,700,222	Davina McCall, Alan Carr and Adam Hills	3.45
4	26 October 2018	£24,638,037	TBC	Alan Carr, Adam Hills and Maya Jama	3.58
5	15 October 2021	£31,169,340	TBA	Davina McCall, Alan Carr, Adam Hills and Maya Jama	

=== 2012 ===
The 2012 telethon aired live on Channel 4 on Friday 19 October 2012 presented by Davina McCall, Alan Carr and Christian Jessen, and was broadcast live from 19.30 until 00.00.

The evening included, a special 8 Out of 10 Cats episode, a live edition of The Million Pound Drop and saw the cast of Made in Chelsea working in a branch of Tesco.

Following its success, in 2013 Channel 4 announced that a second Stand Up to Cancer telethon would take place in 2014.

=== 2014 ===
The 2014 telethon aired live on Channel 4 on Friday 17 October 2014, hosted by Davina McCall, Alan Carr and Christian Jessen, sponsored by AXA, BT and Scottish Power. The show was extended to start at 19.00 and continues until 02.00.

Clair Rowney, director of Stand Up to Cancer, said: "The Stand Up to Cancer animation truly captures the energy of this year’s campaign and shows how our fight against cancer is at a turning point. Stand Up to Cancer is an opportunity for the entire UK to come together to accelerate new cancer treatments to UK patients and save lives.

==== Features ====
- The 2014 Celebrity edition of Gogglebox starring Kathy Burke, Noel Gallagher, Naomi Campbell, Miranda Hart, Paul O'Grady and Kate Moss as well as the regular cast
- Taylor Swift and Jamie Oliver's cookery sketch. Filming in ITV's This Morning studios, the feature saw Oliver singing "Bake It Off", a parody of Swift's song "Shake It Off"
- Derren Brown feature with Martin Freeman and Amanda Abbington
- Casting feature for Andy Murray: The Movie with judges Richard Ayoade and Andy Murray
- Special edition of Alan Carr: Chatty Man with Laura Whitmore, Keith Lemon, Melanie Brown, Jonathan Ross, Ollie Locke and Joey Essex
- Special edition of The Last Leg starring Adam Hills, Josh Widdicombe and Alex Brooker and various celebrity guests

Alan Carr played Deal or No Deal for Stand up to Cancer, and raised £41,000.

==== Stars at Your Service ====
Stars at Your Service is a 2014 spin-off from the main Channel 4 telethon airing in four parts, presented by Alan Carr and Davina McCall with Paddy McGuinness providing the narration. The public could request celebrities via the programme's official website.

Episode 1 (3 October)

- Melanie C
- Hugh Fearnley-Whittingstall
- Ollie Locke
- Marvin Humes
- Jon Snow
- Dr. Dawn Harper
- Ashley Banjo
- Conor Maynard

Episode 2 (4 October 2014)

- Rachel Riley
- Union J
- Joe Swash
- Jamie Laing
- Michael Ball

Episode 3 (10 October 2014)

- Katie Price
- Jamelia
- Warwick Davis
- Anton Du Beke
- Greg Davies
- Johnny Vegas
- Chris Ramsey
- Beverley Knight
- Al Murray

Episode 4 (11 October 2014)

- Dave Berry
- Pixie Lott
- Tim Vine
- Ashley Taylor Dawson
- Sarah Beeny
- Russell Howard
- Alfie Boe
- Tamara Ecclestone
- Russell Kane
- Kelly Hoppen

==== Feeling Nuts Comedy Night ====
The Feeling Nuts Comedy Night was part of Stand up to Cancer's 2014 season and The Feeling Nuts Movement, which raises awareness of testicular cancer. The show was hosted by Jack Whitehall and featured comedy sketches from One Direction, James Corden, Jimmy Carr, Cara Delevingne, and Men Behaving Badly.

=== 2015 ===
SU2C returned on Friday 9 October 2015, but a telethon wasn't aired, just with a night of SU2C special editions of Channel 4's popular shows. The schedule, which ran from 20.00 to 23.25, is as follows.

- 20.00: The Last Leg SU2C Special
- 21.00: Gogglebox Celebrity SU2C Special, starring Jamie Dornan, Nick Frost, Geri Halliwell, Boy George and Miranda Hart with her real-life mum Diane and her sitcom mum Patricia Hodge.
- 22.20: Alan Carr: Chatty Man SU2C Special
- 23.25: First Dates Celebrity SU2C Special aired on Monday 12 October at 21.00–22.00.

=== 2016 ===
SU2C returned in October 2016. A telethon was confirmed in August 2016, airing on 21 October live on Channel 4.

One part of the telethon featured Noel Gallagher performing "Half the World Away" as tribute to comedian and actress Caroline Aherne, who had died from cancer earlier that year. Boy George performed David Bowie's “Starman” – nine months after his idol's death from liver cancer – along with the National Health Service choir.

==== Celebrity Island with Bear Grylls ====
In April 2016, as part of Stand Up to Cancer UK, a celebrity edition of The Island would be made to raise money in air of Cancer Research UK. The series will see 10 celebrities live on the island for two weeks with the show airing for 60-minute episodes over the same week as the telethon night. Celebrities taking part were Aston Merrygold, Dawn Harper, Dom Joly, Josie Long, Karen Danczuk, Lydia Bright, Mark Jenkins, Ollie Locke, Thom Evans and Zöe Salmon

==== The Crystal Maze ====
A one-off special edition of The Crystal Maze was filmed for the SU2C 2016 at The Crystal Maze Live Experience in London, presented by Stephen Merchant, accompanied by a team of five celebrities – Sara Cox, Michelle Keegan, Rio Ferdinand, Josh Widdicombe and Jonnie Peacock – and aired on 16 October. They won a total of £25,000 for Cancer Research UK in the Crystal Dome. The success of the special subsequently led to the series being revived.

=== 2017 ===
SU2C returned on 3 November 2017 with celebrity specials of Channel 4 programmes.

==== Celebrity Hunted ====
It was confirmed in October 2017 that a celebrity edition of the Channel 4 series Celebrity Hunted would be made for Stand Up To Cancer. The series began airing on 10 October 2017 over 4 episodes.

The celebrities taking part were Gogglebox’s Stephanie and Dominic Parker, Made in Chelsea’s Jamie Laing & Spencer Matthews, The Wanted’s Jay McGuiness & Siva Kaneswaran and Anneka Rice.

==== Celebrity First Dates ====
It was confirmed that another Celebrity edition of Celebrity First Dates would be made. Airing on 3 November 2017.

The celebrities taking part include 80's singer Sinitta, MP for Lichfield Michael Fabricant, TV and Capital London Breakfast presenter Roman Kemp and TV presenter Jan Leeming.

==== Gogglebox: Celebrity Special ====
It was confirmed in October 2017, that Gogglebox: Celebrity Special would broadcast on 3 November 2017. The one episode celebrity special editions for SU2C has continued since 2017 to present.

The celebrities that took part were Liam Gallagher, Jeremy Corbyn, Jessica Hynes, Freddie Flintoff, Jamie Redknapp, Ed Sheeran, Big Narstie, Example and Ozzy and Sharon Osbourne.

=== 2018 ===
The 2018 telethon aired on Friday 26 October, and was hosted by Alan Carr, Adam Hills and Maya Jama.

==== Celebrity Hunted ====
The second series of Celebrity Hunted began airing on 16 October on Channel 4. Celebrities participating in the series include Chris Hughes and Kem Cetinay, AJ Pritchard and Louis Smith, Dom Joly and Vicky Pattison, and Kay Burley and Johnny Mercer.

==== Celebrity Call Centre ====
In October 2018, it was confirmed that eight celebrities would take part in a special for Stand Up to Cancer, where they will be agony aunts and uncles in a call centre. The celebrities taking part will be Georgia Toffolo, Joel Dommett, Kimberley Walsh, Kim Woodburn, Louie Spence, Mo Gilligan, Rachel Riley and Tyger Drew-Honey. It will air on 22 October on Channel 4.

=== 2020 ===
Stand Up to Cancer took place on 23 October 2020

=== 2021 ===
The telethon was on 15 October 2021 and was hosted by Davina McCall, Alan Carr, Maya Jama and Adam Hills. The programme had an episode of Celebrity Gogglebox split-up into chunks throughout the night, with Graham Norton, Michelle Visage and Matt Lucas being some of the celebrities taking part.

Channel 4 also scheduled a number of additional programmes in the run-up to the telethon, including a documentary about boyband singer Tom Parker as he tries to organise a special charity concert at The Royal Albert Hall, in aid of Stand Up to Cancer, called Inside My Head. The documentary was supposed to be followed by the full concert on 4Music but, due to the ongoing problems at the channel caused by the Red Bee Media broadcast centre incident on 25 September 2021, this live show has not yet been broadcast.

== National Comedy Awards ==
The National Comedy Awards is a new annual awards ceremony event, replacing the former The British Comedy Awards. It will have multiple categories all decided by a public vote. The first ceremony will be held on 15 December 2021 from London Roundhouse.

Channel 4 is linking the awards to its Stand Up To Cancer charity drive, with comedy fans encouraged to donate to help accelerate life-saving research. Aiming to celebrate "the UK's most brilliant comedy content and creators", the new awards are being seen by some as a replacement for The British Comedy Awards, which ran from 1990 to 2014, with Channel 4 broadcasting the show from 2011 until its demise.

=== Ceremonies ===
Edition	Year	Date	Location	Host	Broadcaster
1st	2021	15 December 2021	London Roundhouse	Tom Allen	Channel 4

=== Categories ===
Award	Duration
Best Comedy Entertainment Series	2021–present
Outstanding Female Comedy Entertainment Performance	2021–present
Outstanding Male Comedy Entertainment Performance	2021–present
Beat Scripted Comedy Series	2021–present
Outstanding Comedy Actress	2021–present
Outstanding Comedy Actor	2021–present
Outstanding Supporting Role	2021–present
Best Stand Up Show	2021–present
Best Comedy Podcast	2021–present
Comedy Breakthrough Award	2021–present
Special Recognition Award	2021–present
