= The Sarah Millican Television Programme =

- Genre: Comedy
- Directed by: Geraldine Dowd
- Presented by: Sarah Millican
- Theme music composer: Trellis
- Country of origin: United Kingdom
- Original language: English
- No. of series: 3
- No. of episodes: 20

Production
- Executive producers: Alan Tyler (for BBC); Graham Stuart
- Producers: Paul McGettigan; Tom Miller
- Production location: Dock10
- Running time: 30 minutes
- Production companies: So Television; Chopsy Productions

Original release
- Network: BBC Two
- Release: 8 March 2012 – 22 December 2013

The Sarah Millican Television Programme is a British comedy television show hosted by comedian Sarah Millican. The show's central theme is a comical review of television programming (particularly British television). Each edition features as a topic a different genre of television; Millican would lampoon the topic genre in monologue segments that were intercut with jocular interviews of celebrities known for work within that genre. Three series of the show were broadcast between early 2012 and late 2013. A pilot episode was filmed on 25 May 2011, but never broadcast.

Filmed at Dock10, MediaCityUK in Salford in late 2011, the show was a co-production between So Television and Millican's own company, Chopsy Productions.

== Episodes ==
=== Series 1 ===
Episode	Air date	Theme(s)	Guests
1	8 March 2012	Wildlife and dating	Chris Packham and Tracey Cox
2	15 March 2012	Drama and weather	Simon Callow, John Kettley and Phyllis Logan
3	22 March 2012	Survival and food	Olly Smith, Charley Boorman and Paul Hollywood
4	29 March 2012	Property and fashion	Sarah Beeny, Julien Macdonald and Robert Peston
5	5 April 2012	Sport and entertainment	Clare Balding, Beth Tweddle and Louie Spence
6	12 April 2012	Embarrassing Bodies and crime	Pixie McKenna and Rav Wilding

=== Christmas Special 2012 ===
A Christmas special was announced after series 1 had finished.

Episode	Air date	Theme(s)	Guests
7	23 December 2012	Christmas, Downton Abbey and EastEnders	Hugh Bonneville and Shane Richie

=== Series 2 ===
On 27 April 2012, it was announced that BBC Two had ordered a second series of the show, due to start on 15 January 2013.

Episode	Air date	Theme(s)	Guests
1	15 January 2013	Reality TV and Casualty	Craig Revel Horwood, Melanie C, Charles Dale, Tony Marshall, Azuka Oforka, Suzanne Packer
2	22 January 2013	Deal or No Deal and magic	Noel Edmonds and Pete Firman
3	29 January 2013	Property, craft and science	Kirstie Allsopp and Michael Mosley
4	5 February 2013	News, politics and Geordie Shore	Nick Robinson, Bill Turnbull, Gary 'Gaz' Beadle, Charlotte-Letitia Crosby, Holly Hagan and James Tindale
5	12 February 2013	Business and Coast	Stuart Baggs and Neil Oliver
6	19 February 2013	Deadly 60 and Soccer Saturday	Steve Backshall and Jeff Stelling

=== Series 3 ===
Series 3 began on Tuesday 24 September 2013, along with extended 40-minute repeats entitled "The Sarah Millican Slightly Longer Television Programme".

Episode	Air date	Theme(s)	Guests
1	24 September 2013	Driving, crime drama and Pointless	Quentin Willson, Bradley Walsh and Richard Osman
2	1 October 2013	Travel, antiques and children's programmes	Michael Palin, Helen Skelton and Tim Wonnacott
3	8 October 2013	US drama, gardening programmes and musicals	David Harewood, Diarmuid Gavin and Matthew Morrison
4	15 October 2013	Medical and fantasy programmes	Christian Jessen, John Bradley-West, Finn Jones and Kristian Nairn
5	22 October 2013	Finance, history programmes and Made in Chelsea	Martin Lewis, Dan Cruickshank and Gabriella Ellis
6	29 October 2013	Formula One, entertainment and consumer programmes	Suzi Perry, Bruno Tonioli, Alex Jones and Matt Baker

=== Christmas Special 2013 ===
Episode	Air date	Theme(s)	Guests
7	22 December 2013	Christmas and Call the Midwife	Phillip Schofield, Judy Parfitt and Helen George

== DVD release ==
A "Best of Series 1 and 2" DVD was released on 11 November 2013 by 4DVD. However, Series 3 and its Christmas special have never been released on DVD.
