= Freaky Eaters =

Freaky Eaters may refer to:

- Freaky Eaters (British TV programme), a documentary programme which aired on BBC Three from 2007 to 2009.
- Freaky Eaters (American TV program), based on the UK version, which aired on TLC from 2010 to 2011.
