= Dawn Harper =

Dawn Harper may refer to:

- Dawn Harper (doctor) (born 1963), English doctor and media personality
- Dawn Harper-Nelson (born 1984), American athlete
- Dawn Harper, a fictional character in the American TV series Nicky, Ricky, Dicky & Dawn
