= Brad McKay =

Brad McKay may refer to:

- Brad McKay (footballer)
- Brad McKay (doctor)

== See also ==
- Brad Mackay, Australian rugby league player
