= Christian Jessen =

British television presenter

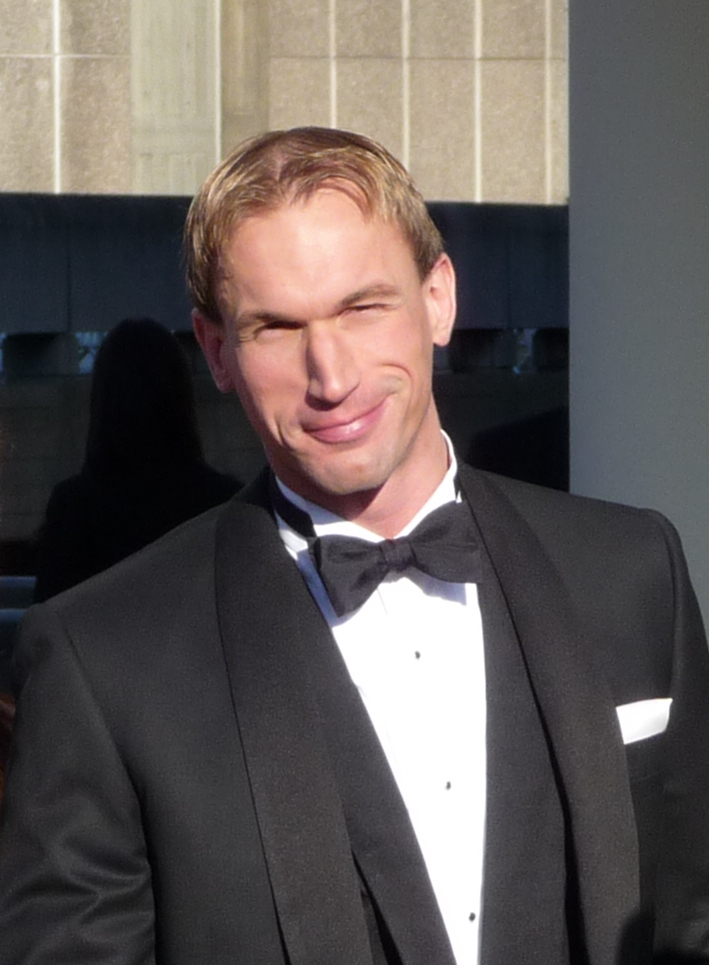
- Christian Jessen at the British Academy Television Awards 2009
- Born: Christian Spencer Jessen; 4 March 1977 (age 49); London, England
- Education: MBBS; MSc
- Alma mater: Uppingham School; University College London; London School of Hygiene & Tropical Medicine
- Occupations: Physician; television personality; writer
- Television: Embarrassing Bodies; Doctor Doctor; Supersize vs Superskinny
- Partner: Rogério Barreto

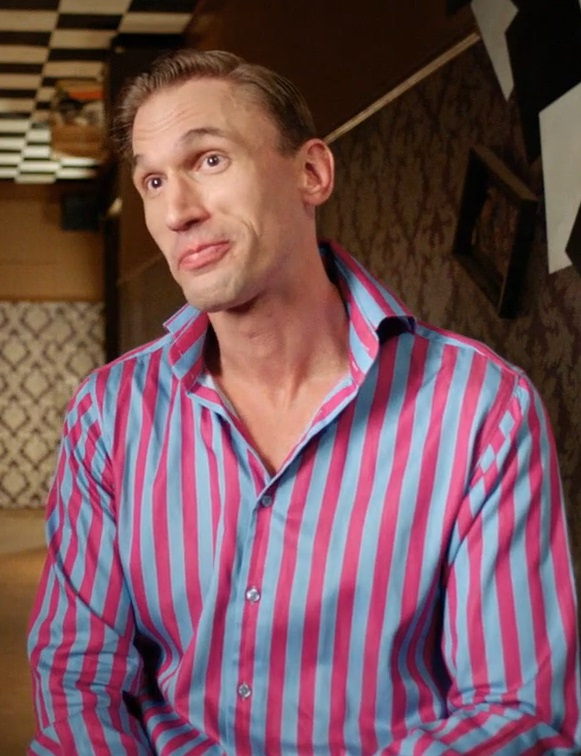
Jessen in "Roald Dahl’s Most Marvellous Book" (2016)

Christian Spencer Jessen (born 4 March 1977) is a British celebrity doctor, television personality, and writer. He is best known for appearing in the Channel 4 programmes Embarrassing Bodies (2007–2015) and Supersize vs Superskinny (2008–2014).

== Education ==
Jessen was educated at Uppingham School, a co-educational independent school situated in the small market town of Uppingham in Rutland, followed by University College London and the London School of Hygiene & Tropical Medicine, both constituent colleges of the University of London in Central London, where he received his MBBS degrees in 2001.

== Career ==
Jessen studied medicine as an undergraduate at University College London, graduating in 2001. He holds a MSc degree in sexual health, and has a particular interest in HIV and malaria, which were the focus of his work in Kenya and Uganda. An advocate for HIV education and testing, in 2015, he was named National HIV Testing Week Ambassador.

=== Television ===
From 2007 to 2015, Jessen co-presented Embarrassing Bodies alongside Pixie McKenna and Dawn Harper. The show has had a number of spin-off series including Embarrassing Teenage Bodies, Embarrassing Bodies: Kids and Embarrassing Fat Bodies.

Another spin off was set in Australia in 2013 called Embarrassing Bodies Down Under, which Jessen co-hosted with Brad McKay, Ginni Mansberg, and Sam Hay.

He presented Channel 4's Supersize vs Superskinny series from 2008 until 2014.

In 2012, Jessen appeared as the health and fitness expert in Hotel GB. He was the winner of popular culinary show Ready Steady Cook and has appeared as a celebrity contestant on The Weakest Link. He was also the winner of the BBC show Antiques Master.

He was Jack Osbourne's doctor during the filming of Finding God, and also featured in Harley Street, a documentary. Other television appearances include Sex in Court and The Wright Stuff.

In 2012 and 2014, he co-presented the Stand Up to Cancer telethon alongside Davina McCall and Alan Carr.

In 2014, he produced and starred in a documentary series for television called Undercover Doctor: Cure Me I’m Gay. In the series, Jessen investigates therapies purported to be "cures" for homosexuality.

In an appearance on Loose Women, Jessen performed a live HIV test on a woman and drew criticism for not wearing protective gloves. Jessen defended his actions and called for more understanding on how HIV spreads.

In 2018, he co-starred and produced a documentary series for UKTV Play called Dr Christian: 12 hours to cure your Street, in which he travelled across the UK in a mobile clinic to treat individuals in their hometowns.

=== Writing ===
He is the author of Can I Just Ask? (2010). He has also written three books for adolescents: Dr Christian's Guide to Growing Up (2013), Dr Christian's Guide to Dealing with the Tricky Stuff (2015) and Dr Christian's Guide to You (2016).

== Controversies ==
=== BBC Panorama investigation ===
In August 2018, a BBC Panorama documentary investigation revealed Jessen's involvement in a private online pharmacy, UK Meds. Such sites are believed to allow people to purchase potentially dangerous prescriptions with ease and cannot be regulated by the Care Quality Commission due to a loophole allowing them to issue prescriptions via third party doctors in Romania. The owner of the pharmacy, Mason Soiza, has previously faced accusations of running escort agencies and WordPress plugin scams.

A spokesperson for Jessen told Panorama that "he was engaged by UK Meds to present short information videos about various medical conditions and that he does not prescribe medication, nor does he endorse a specific product, service or brand."

=== COVID pandemic ===
During the COVID-19 pandemic, Jessen sparked criticism for comments, saying that Italian COVID-19 countermeasures were an "excuse for a long siesta". He also commented on the severity of the pandemic, regarding it only as a case of bad cold and scaremongering by the media.

=== Arlene Foster ===
In 2020, the First Minister of Northern Ireland Arlene Foster launched legal action against Jessen for defamation over a tweet in December 2019 that falsely claimed she had been having an extra-marital affair. The tweet was not deleted until two weeks after it was posted. In court, Foster alleged that the tweet was posted at a time when some anonymous Twitter accounts were claiming she was having an affair with one of her security guards. It was further alleged that Jessen had been contacted 13 times by email and letter about it but had not answered. In May 2021, Mr Justice McAlinden awarded Foster £125,000 in damages and full costs after Jessen lost the case, describing his conduct as "an outrageously bad libel". The judge added that Jessen's failure to apologise for or to retract the libel were aggravating features.

== Personal life ==
Jessen's partner is Rogério Barreto, who is Brazilian. His father is German and his mother is English.

He is an atheist, a humanist, and a patron of Humanists UK, a charity that advocates for secularism, equalities, and human rights. He has stated that he has muscle dysmorphia.

He endorsed Boris Johnson during the 2019 Conservative Party leadership election.

Christian revealed on Would I Lie to You? that he sleeps with a taxidermied monkey named Elsie, which he bought from a specialist shop after spotting it in a magazine advert.

== Filmography ==
Television

| Year | Title | Role | Notes |
|---|---|---|---|
| 2007–2015 | Embarrassing Bodies | Presenter | Formerly Embarrassing Illnesses |
| 2007 | Doctor, Doctor | Himself | 1 episode |
| 2007 | Sex in Court | Judge | |
| 2008–2009 | Embarrassing Teenage Bodies | Presenter | Embarrassing Bodies spin-off |
| 2008–2014 | Supersize vs Superskinny | Presenter | |
| 2009, 2010 | Angela and Friends | Himself | 17 episodes, weekly "Health and Medicine" segment |
| 2010–2011 | Embarrassing Bodies: Kids | Presenter | Embarrassing Bodies spin-off |
| 2010 | One Born at Christmas | Doctor | 6-part One Born Every Minute spin-off |
| 2010 | The Ugly Face of Beauty | Presenter | |
| 2011 | Supersize vs Superskinny Kids | Presenter | Supersize vs Superskinny spin-off |
| 2011 | Stephen Fry's 100 Greatest Gadgets | Himself | TV documentary |
| 2011 | Mongrels | Himself | One episode |
| 2011 | A Night with the Stars | Himself | TV documentary |
| 2011–2012 | Embarrassing Fat Bodies | Presenter | Embarrassing Bodies spin-off |
| 2012 | Hotel GB | Health and fitness expert | |
| 2012, 2014 | Stand Up to Cancer | Presenter | Live charity telethon |
| 2012 | Drugs Live: The Ecstasy Trial | Presenter | Two part live documentary |
| 2013, 2014 | Embarrassing Bodies Down Under | Himself | Embarrassing Bodies spin-off |
| 2014 | Undercover Doctor: Cure Me I'm Gay | Presenter | |
| 2017–2018 | Doctor Christian Will See You Now | Presenter | |
| 2018 | Dr Christian: 12 Hours to Cure your Street | Presenter, Doctor | Running a mobile clinic treating people in homes around the UK |

Guest appearances

- 8 Out of 10 Cats (2010, 2011, 2014)
- The Alan Titchmarsh Show (2010, 2011)
- Would I Lie to You? (2012)
- Celebrity Juice (2012, 2013, 2015)
- Sunday Brunch (2012, 2013, 2014)
- Alan Carr: Chatty Man (2012, 2014)
- Alan Carr's Summertime Specstacular (2012)
- The Million Pound Drop (2012)
- The Sarah Millican Television Programme (2013)
- Let's Do Lunch with Gino & Mel (2013)
- Celebrity Fifteen to One (2014)
- Weekend (2014)
- Sweat the Small Stuff (2014)
- Mel & Sue (2015)
- Room 101 (2015)
- The Saturday Show (2015)
- The Chase: Celebrity Special (2015)
