= Supersize vs Superskinny =

2008–2014 UK television series

- Title card from most recent episode of Series 4
- Presented by: Dr Christian Jessen (2008–2014)
- Starring: Anna Richardson (2008–2010)
- Narrated by: Daisy Donovan; Liza Tarbuck (2008–2014)
- Country of origin: United Kingdom
- Original language: English
- No. of series: 7
- No. of episodes: 63

Production
- Executive producers: Colette Foster; Oliver Wright
- Running time: 60 minutes (inc. adverts)
- Production company: Remarkable Television

Original release
- Network: Channel 4
- Release: 22 January 2008 – 6 March 2014

Supersize vs Superskinny is a British television programme on Channel 4 that featured information about dieting and extreme eating lifestyles. One of the main show features was a weekly comparison between an overweight person, and an underweight person. The two were taken to a feeding clinic, and lived together for five days (later on two days), swapping diets while supervised by Dr Christian Jessen.

== Overview ==
The overweight person swapped diets with the underweight person. While the underweight person was suddenly given more food than they would usually eat in a few days at one meal, the overweight person was usually given tea, coffee, a small snack, or nothing sometimes. Most of the underweight people were unable to finish their meal, though occasionally the overweight people also refused or struggled to eat their meals, usually after having been in the feeding clinic for a few days. Occasionally both were allowed to leave the feeding clinic for a meal swap, if it was part of both of the participants' diets.

In earlier series, the show featured a food tube for each person. The tube contained what each person ate and drank in the span of one week.

Usually Dr Jessen used shock tactics to demonstrate how poor someone's diet was. Both participants were occasionally shown the extent of their poor diet - for example, through bags of sugar. The "superskinny" would usually be shown pictures of their body and be told about the drastic long-term health effects. In the second series, the "supersizer" was sent to meet a woman named Lisa, whose obesity had meant that she could no longer care for herself and was receiving an operation because of her weight. In later series, the "supersizer" was sent to the United States to visit someone that was heavier than they were. It was used as a shock tactic to show the "supersizer" what they could become if they did not stop their unhealthy lifestyles.

The show also featured Anna Richardson in the 1st, 2nd, and 3rd series, who in the first series examined new methods to lose weight by trying diets she found on the Internet, some of which had shocking side effects. For example, Anna attempted Laser lipolysis, which went drastically wrong and resulted in severe bruising. Also, she discovered Diabulimia and spoke to Isabelle Caro, a French actress, renowned for her underweight figure and anorexia campaign. In the second series, Anna recruited a group of "flab-fighters" - women who wanted to lose weight and whose weight was tracked weekly - and she visited Los Angeles to discover ways A-listers would lose weight. The same series also saw a group of four anorexic women attempt to overcome their eating disorder through eating and preparing foods they would usually avoid with the help of a leading eating disorder specialist. In later series, formerly anorexic journalist Emma Woolf interviewed a number of people who had experienced the effects of eating disorders.

The second, third and fourth series also introduced a section whereby a group of people recovering from eating disorders (the second and third series featured people exclusively suffering from anorexia nervosa, while the fourth included a mixture of eating disorders) were overwatched by a specialist psychiatrist and dietician Ursula Philpot who co-presented Supersize vs Superskinny and who worked to challenge their issues with food.

During the first series in 2008, one feature involved Gillian McKeith, who tried to find a way to "ban big bums" in the UK. She tested out different exercises to tone the buttocks of different groups of ladies, and made a leader board for the most effective.

== Criticism ==
The programme has been the subject of criticism and debate, surrounding its portrayal of eating disorders to a potentially vulnerable audience, and its influence towards public attitudes on eating disorders. Clare Stephens, in an opinion piece written for MamaMia in 2022, expressed concern over the body shaming behaviours exhibited by the "superskinny" subjects of the programme towards their "supersize" counterparts, along with the behaviours of Christian Jessen, concluding that "at best, the show did a lot to confuse audiences about the relationships between eating and exercise and health and weight. At worst, it put its audience at risk of the vast manifestations of disordered eating that can emerge from distorted beliefs around eating, shape and weight. That impact, unfortunately, is impossible to measure".

== Transmissions ==
Series	Episodes	Originally aired	
Series	Episodes	Series premiere	Series finale
1	8	22 January 2008	11 March 2008
2	10	20 January 2009	8 March 2009
3	9	23 March 2010	18 May 2010
4	11	29 March 2011	17 May 2011
5	10	28 February 2012	1 May 2012
6	10	8 January 2013	12 March 2013
7	8	9 January 2014	6 March 2014

In 2011, a 4-episode children's version titled Supersize vs Superskinny Kids was produced and aired between 21 and 25 March 2011.
