= Cupping therapy =

Pseudoscience whereby suction is applied to the skin

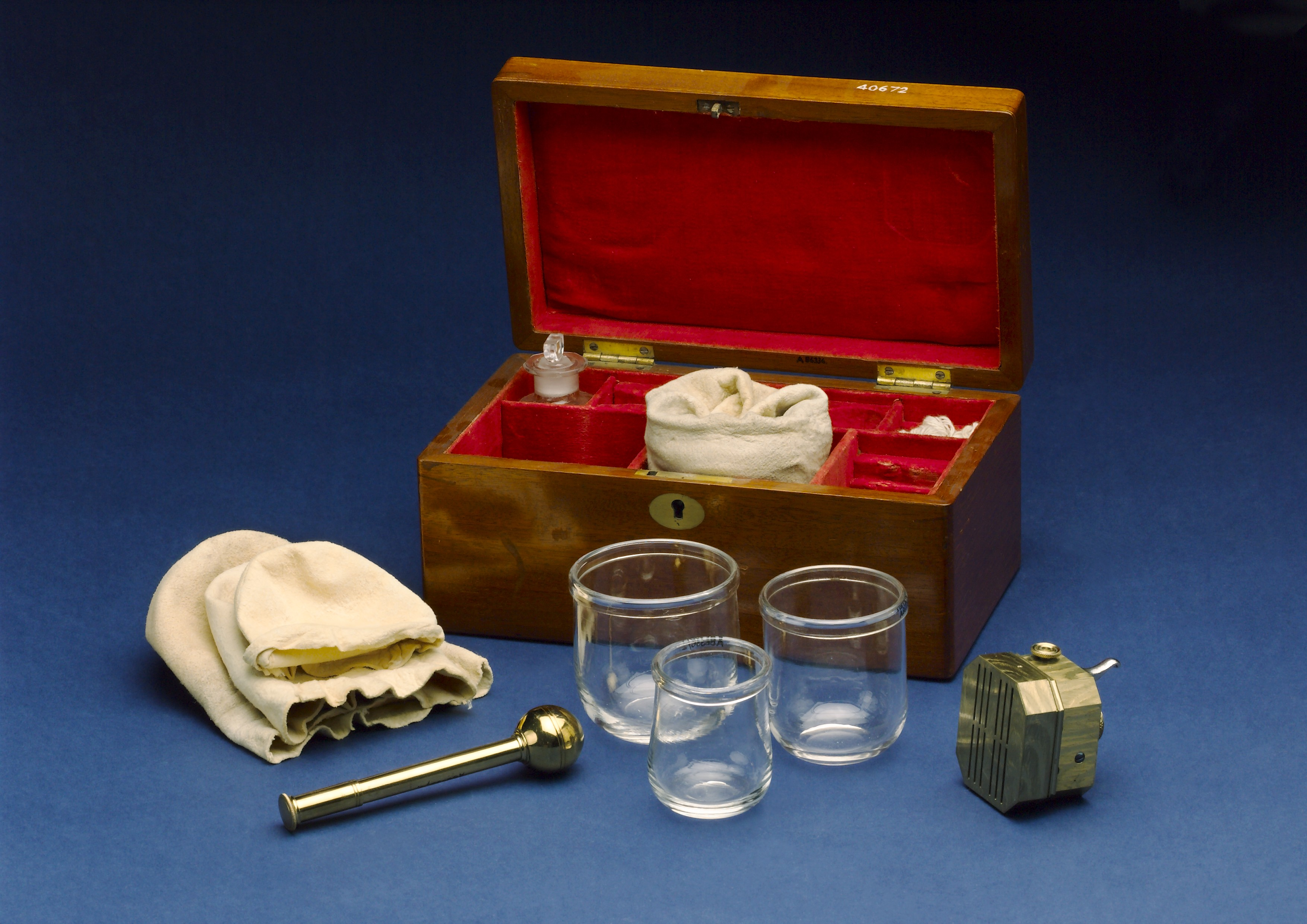
- Cupping and bloodletting set, from London, dating from 1860–1875

Alternative therapy

Cupping therapy

Chinese name
- Traditional Chinese: 拔罐
- Simplified Chinese: 拔罐
Transcriptions
Standard Mandarin
- Hanyu Pinyin: bá guàn
- Bopomofo: ㄅㄚˊㄍㄨㄢˋ
- Wade–Giles: pa2 kuan4
Wu
- Romanization: baq8 kuoe5 (bʌʔ12 kuø34)
Hakka
- Pha̍k-fa-sṳ: Phat-kon
Yue: Cantonese
- Yale Romanization: baht gun
- Jyutping: bat6 gun3

Min name
- Chinese: 摑風 / 吊杯
Transcriptions
Southern Min
- Hokkien POJ: kok-hong / tiàu-poe
- Tâi-lô: kok-hong / tiàu-pue

Vietnamese name
- Vietnamese alphabet: Giác hơi
- Chữ Hán: 覺有

Korean name
- Hangul: 부항
- Hanja: 附缸
Transcriptions
- Revised Romanization: buhang

Cupping therapy (or cup massage) is a pseudoscientific treatment method in which a local suction is created on the skin by using heated cups. As an alternative medicine practice, it is primarily used in Asia, but it is also used in Eastern Europe, the Middle East, and Latin America. There is no conclusive evidence supporting the claimed health benefits of cupping, and critics have characterized the practice as quackery.

Cupping practitioners attempt to use cupping therapy for a wide array of medical conditions including fevers, chronic low back pain, poor appetite, indigestion, high blood pressure, acne, atopic dermatitis, psoriasis, anemia, stroke rehabilitation, nasal congestion, infertility, and menstrual period cramping.

Despite the numerous ailments for which practitioners claim cupping therapy is useful, there is insufficient evidence demonstrating any health benefits. Cupping is generally not harmful for most people. However, there are some risks of harm, especially from wet cupping and fire cupping. Bruising and skin discoloration are among the adverse effects of cupping and are sometimes mistaken for child abuse. In rare instances, the presence of these marks on children has led to legal action against parents who had their children receive cupping therapy.

== History ==
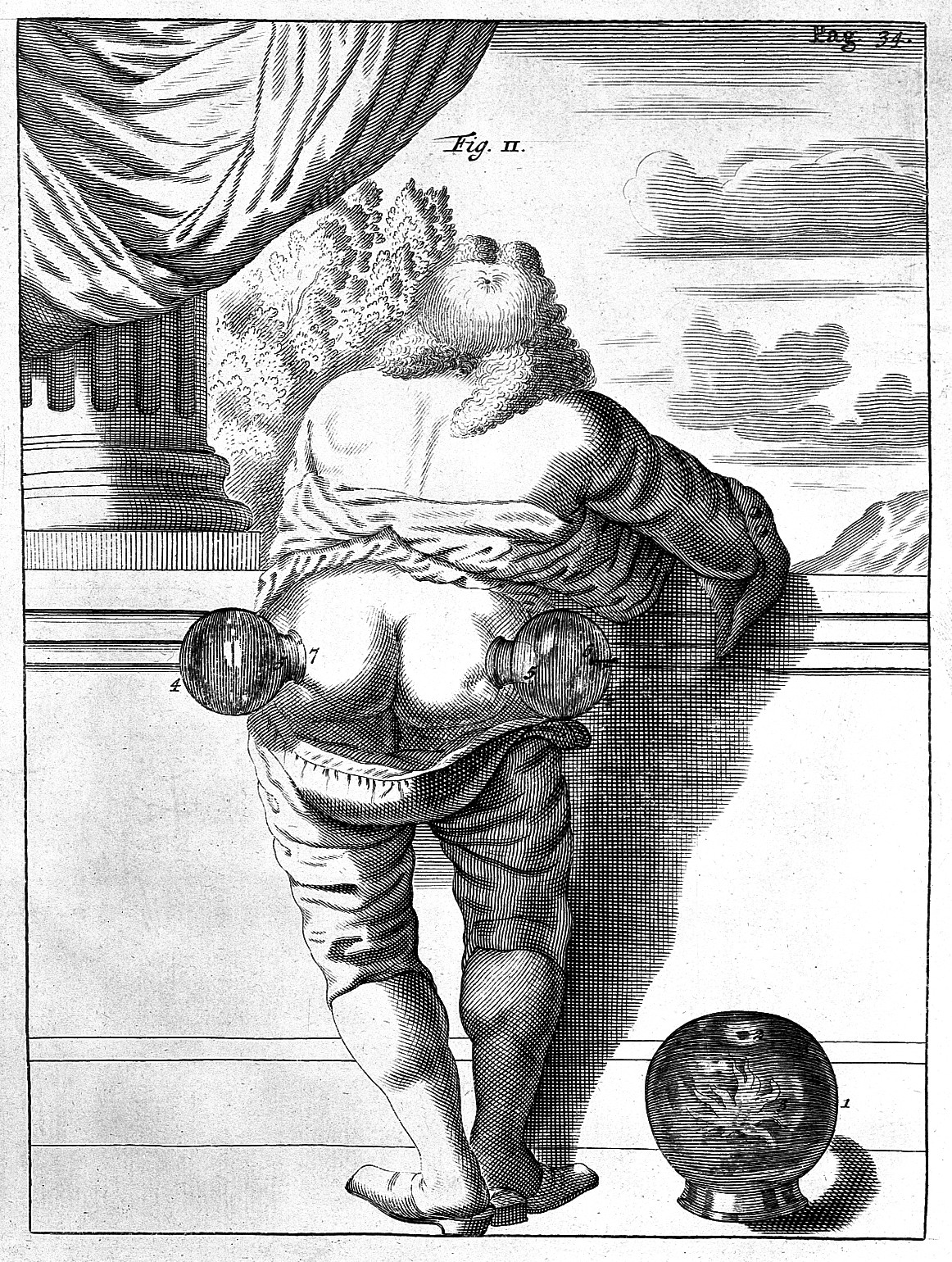
An illustration from the medical textbook Exercitationes practicae, published in 1694, shows a man undergoing cupping on his buttocks.

The origin of cupping is unclear. Iranian traditional medicine uses wet-cupping practices, with the belief that cupping with scarification may eliminate scar tissue, and cupping without scarification would cleanse the body through the organs.

In ancient Greece, Hippocrates (c. 460 – c. 370 BC) used cupping for internal disease and structural problems, and Roman surgeons used it for bloodletting. The method was highly recommended by Islamic Prophet Muhammad and hence well-practiced by Muslim scientists who elaborated and developed the method further. Consequently, this method in its multiple forms spread into medicine throughout Asian and European civilizations. In China, the earliest use of cupping that is recorded is from the Taoist alchemist and herbalist Ge Hong (281–341 AD). Cupping was also mentioned in Maimonides' book on health and was used within the Eastern European Jewish community. William Osler recommended its use for pneumonia and acute myelitis in the early twentieth century.

The practice has been used in hospitals in China since the 1950s as a traditional Chinese medicine modality.

== Scientific evaluation ==
The American Cancer Society notes that "available scientific evidence does not support claims that cupping has any health benefits" and also that the treatment carries a small risk of burns. A review of literature in 2011 determined that "the effectiveness of cupping is currently not well-documented for most conditions", and that systematic reviews showing efficacy for the treatment of pain "were based mostly on poor quality primary studies." This was further supported by a review in 2014 which demonstrated that previous evidence supporting cupping has resulted from "unreasonable design and poor research quality". Subsequent systematic reviews have also identified poor research quality, inconsistent approaches to study blinding, and varying methodologies among studies.

There is a lack of evidence to support the use of cupping therapy for acne. Additionally, cupping is often practiced along with other acupuncture therapies and therefore cannot exclusively account for resultant positive benefits. Many reviews suggest there is insufficient scientific evidence to support the use of cupping techniques to combat relevant diseases and chronic pain. Cupping has been characterized as quackery.

The lack of apparent benefits of cupping treatments are discussed by Simon Singh and Edzard Ernst in their 2008 book Trick or Treatment.

As a pseudoscientific detoxification ritual, proponents of cupping falsely claim that it can remove unspecified toxins from the body. Proponents also falsely claim that cupping "improves blood flow" to help sore muscles. James Hamblin notes that a bruise caused by cupping "is a blood clot, though, and clotted blood is definitionally not flowing."

Critics of alternative medicine have spoken out against cupping therapy. Harriet Hall and Mark Crislip have characterized cupping as "pseudoscience nonsense", "a celebrity fad", and "gibberish", and observed that there is no evidence that cupping works any better than a placebo. Pharmacologist David Colquhoun writes that cupping is "laughable... and utterly implausible." Practicing surgeon David Gorski observes that "it's all risk for no benefit. It has no place in modern medicine, or at least shouldn't."

== Safety ==
Cupping is generally considered safe for most people when performed by trained practitioners; however, it may not be suitable for everyone.

In 2016, the Cambodian Ministry of Health warned that cupping could be a health risk and particularly dangerous for people with high blood pressure or heart problems. According to the NCCIH "Cupping can cause side effects such as persistent skin discoloration, scars, burns, and infections, and may worsen eczema or psoriasis".

Cupping causes breaks in the capillaries (small blood vessels) in the papillary dermis layer of the skin, resulting in the appearance of petechiae and purpura. These marks are sometimes mistaken for signs of child abuse when cupping is performed on children.

Cupping therapy adverse events can be divided into local and systemic adverse events. The local adverse events may include scar formation, burns, linear bruising or streaks (wet cupping), skin ulcers, undesired darkening of the skin, panniculitis, erythema ab igne, induction of the Koebner phenomenon in susceptible individuals with psoriasis, and pain at the cupping site. A theoretical risk of infection exists but there are no reports of this as of 2012.

There are also issues with a lack of safety in cup massages as there is still a need to establish proper application protocols.

== Claimed uses ==
Cupping practitioners use cupping therapy for a wide array of medical conditions including fevers, pain, poor appetite, indigestion, high blood pressure, acne, atopic dermatitis, psoriasis, anemia, stroke rehabilitation, nasal congestion, infertility, and dysmenorrhea.

There is low to moderate evidence that cupping can reduce pain associated with musculoskeletal pain and myofascial pain syndrome, although the benefits may be indistinguishable from those of a placebo.

== Claimed mechanism of action ==
Proponents claim cupping has a therapeutic effect and removes unspecified "toxins", stagnant blood, or "vital energy" when used over acupuncture points with the goal of improving blood circulation.

== Methods ==
Modern suction devices are sometimes used instead of the traditional cups.

A cup massage is performed with medical cups, which have vacuum-sucking, thermochemical, and reflectory impact on the skin, hypoderm, muscles and nerves.

A cup massage lasts 10 to 20 minutes and is accompanied with the feeling of warmth. It can be slightly uncomfortable to the patient.

A cup massage can be performed on almost all areas of human body. Most often cup massage is used to massage back, chest, limbs, and even face.

While details vary between practitioners, societies, and cultures, the practice consists of drawing tissue into a cup placed on the targeted area by creating a partial vacuum – either by the heating and subsequent cooling of the air in the cup or via a mechanical pump. The cup is usually left in place for somewhere between five and fifteen minutes.

Cupping therapy types can be classified using four distinct methods of categorization. The first categorization system relates to "technical types" including dry, wet, massage, and flash cupping therapy. The second categorization relates to "the power of suction-related types" including light, medium, and strong cupping therapy. The third categorization relates to "the method of suction-related types" including fire, manual suction, and electrical suction cupping therapy. The fourth categorization relates to "materials inside cups" including herbal products, water, ozone, moxa, needle, and magnetic cupping therapy.

Further categories of cupping were developed later. The fifth relates to areas treated including facial, abdominal, female, male, and orthopedic cupping therapy. The sixth relates to "other cupping types" that include sports and aquatic cupping.

Cups of various materials
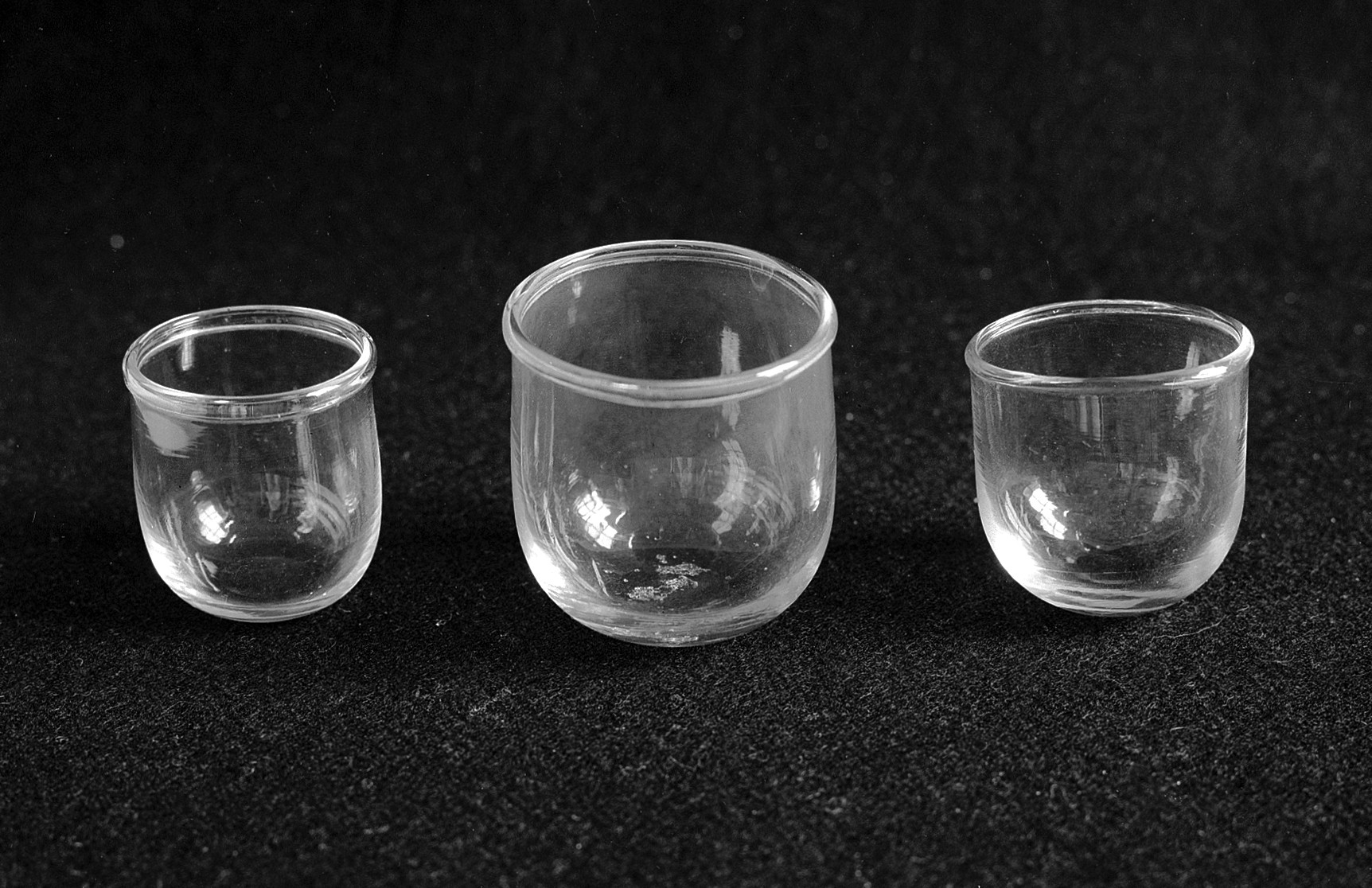
Glass

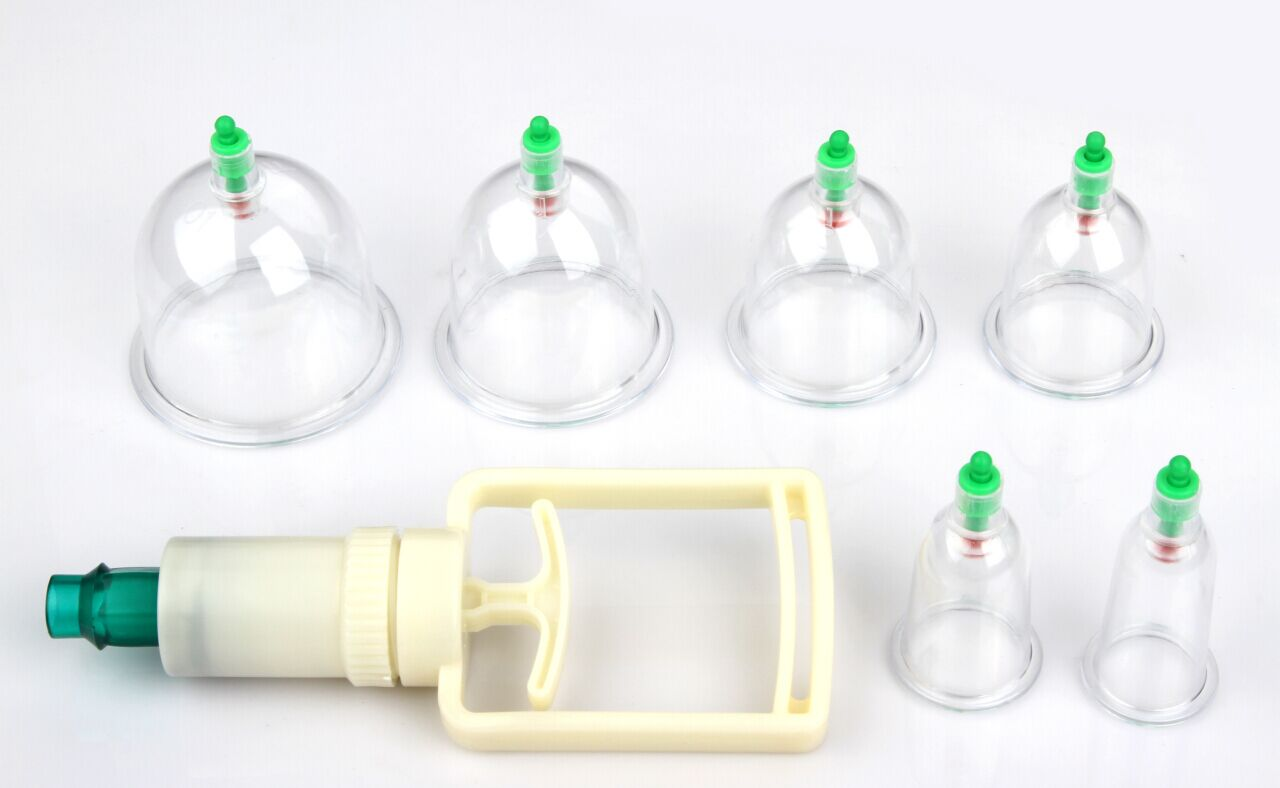
Plastic

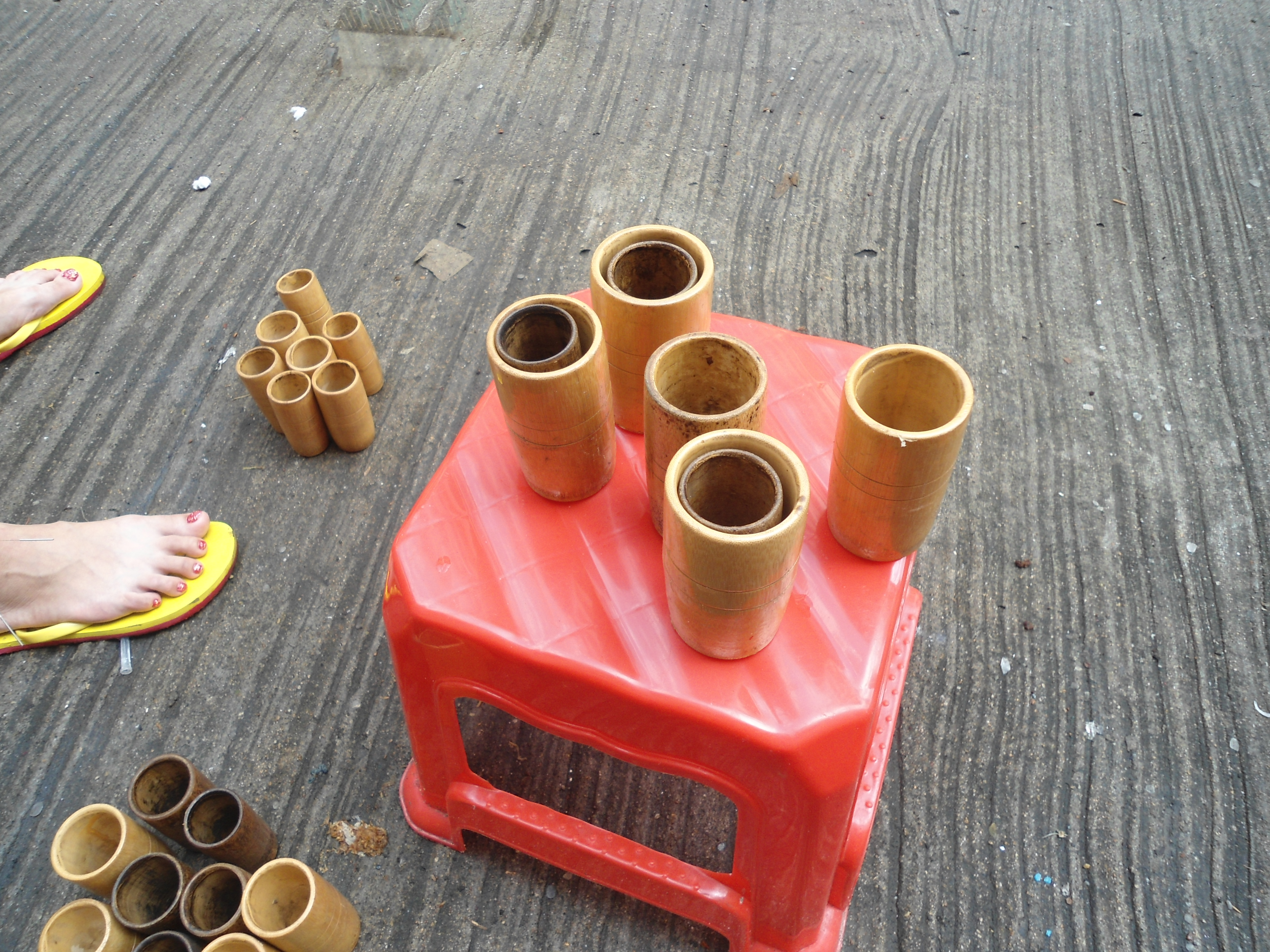
Bamboo

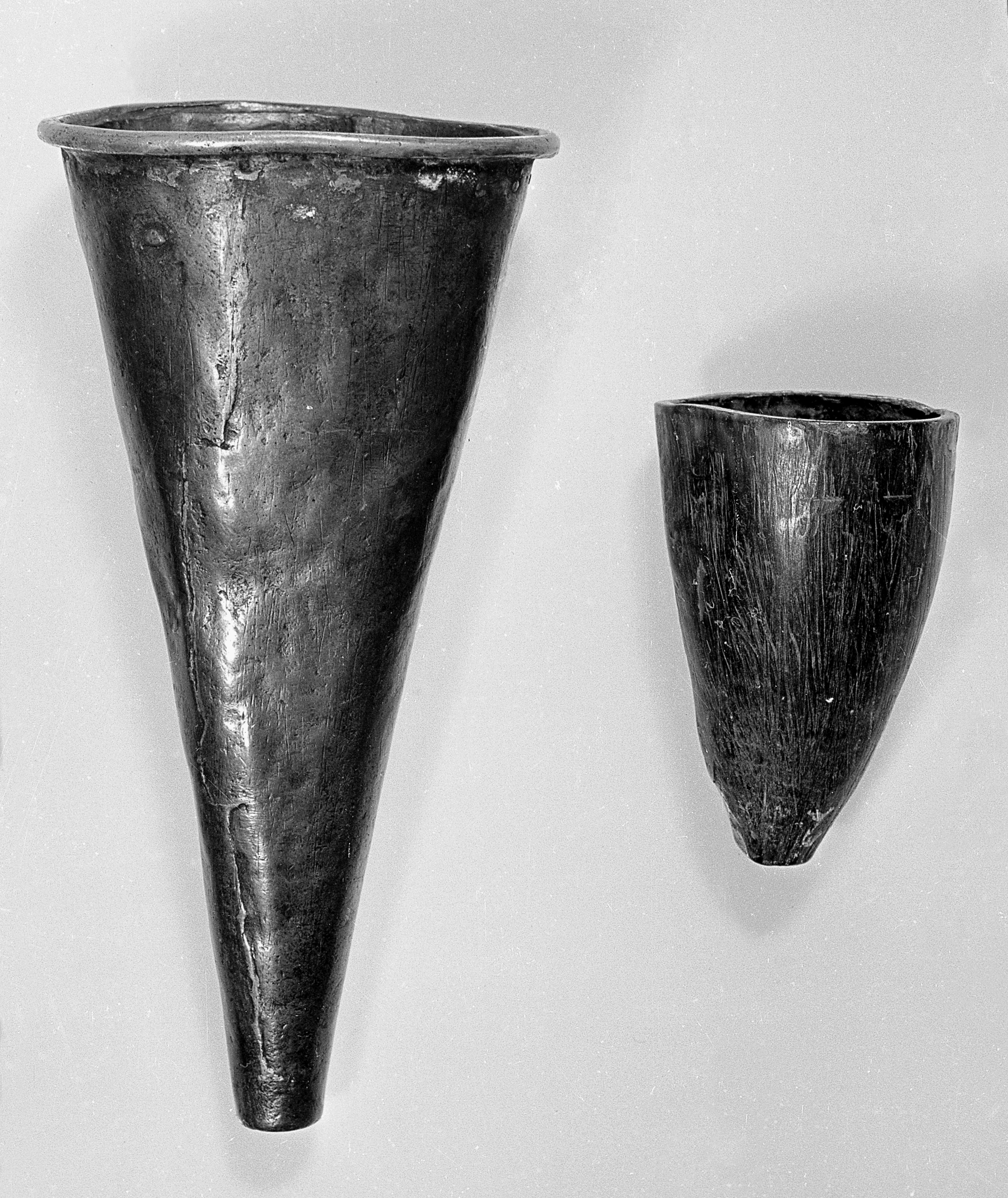
Horn/copper

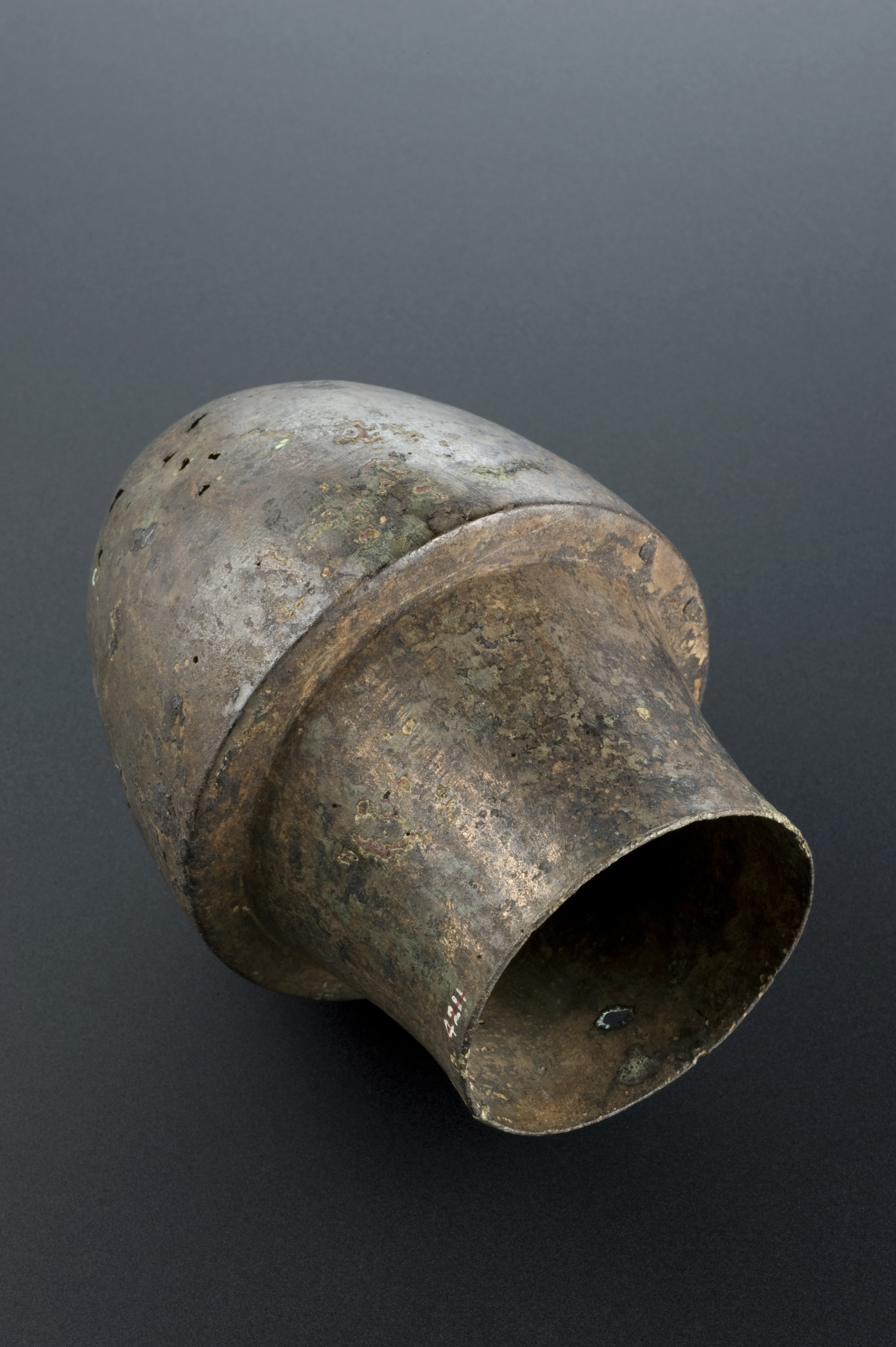
Bronze

=== Dry cupping ===
Dry cupping involves the application of a heated cup on the skin of the back, chest, abdomen, or buttocks. The cooling of the air is then thought to create a suction effect. Bamboo and other materials are sometimes used as alternatives to glass cups.

=== Fire cupping ===
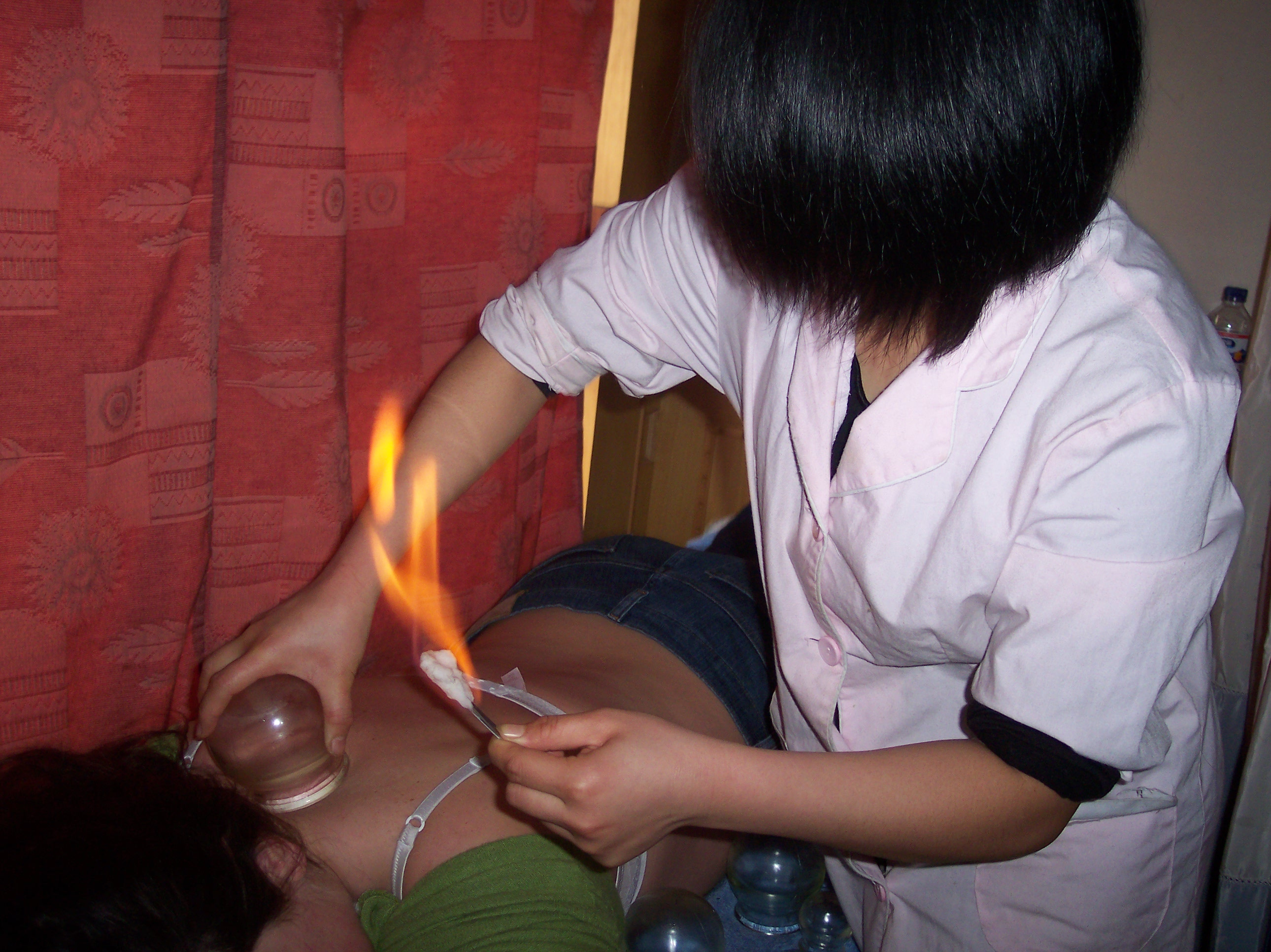
A person receiving fire cupping

Fire cupping involves soaking a cotton ball in almost pure alcohol. The cotton is clamped by a pair of forceps and lit via match or lighter, and, in one motion, placed into the cup and quickly removed, while the cup is placed on the skin. The fire heats the air in the cup which, after cooling reduces in volume creating a negative pressure inside the cup. The cup is then quickly placed onto the body and the negative pressure "sucks" the skin up. Massage oil may be applied to create a better seal as well as allow the cups to glide over muscle groups (e.g. trapezius, erectors, latissimus dorsi, etc.) in an act called "gliding cupping" or "sliding cupping". Dark circles may appear where the cups were placed because of capillary rupture under the skin. There are documented cases of burns caused by fire cupping.

=== Wet cupping ===
Wet cupping, also known as hijama (Arabic: حجامة, lit. 'sucking') or medicinal bleeding, is where blood is drawn by local suction from a small skin incision.

The first reported usages are found in the Islamic hadith, sayings attributed to or describing the actions of the Islamic prophet Muhammad. Hadith from Muhammad al-Bukhari, Muslim ibn al-Hajjaj Nishapuri and Ahmad ibn Hanbal support its recommendation and use by Muhammad. As a result, wet cupping has remained a popular remedy practiced in many parts of the Muslim world.

In Finland, wet cupping has been done since the 15th century, and it is done traditionally in saunas. The cups were made of cattle horns with a valve mechanism inside to create a partial vacuum by sucking the air out. Cupping is still practiced in Finland as part of relaxing and/or health regimens.

The points used in wet and dry cupping are varied and intended to correspond to areas of pain and blockage. Over the years treatment plans have been created but, due to their holistic nature, the points used may vary depending on the individual.

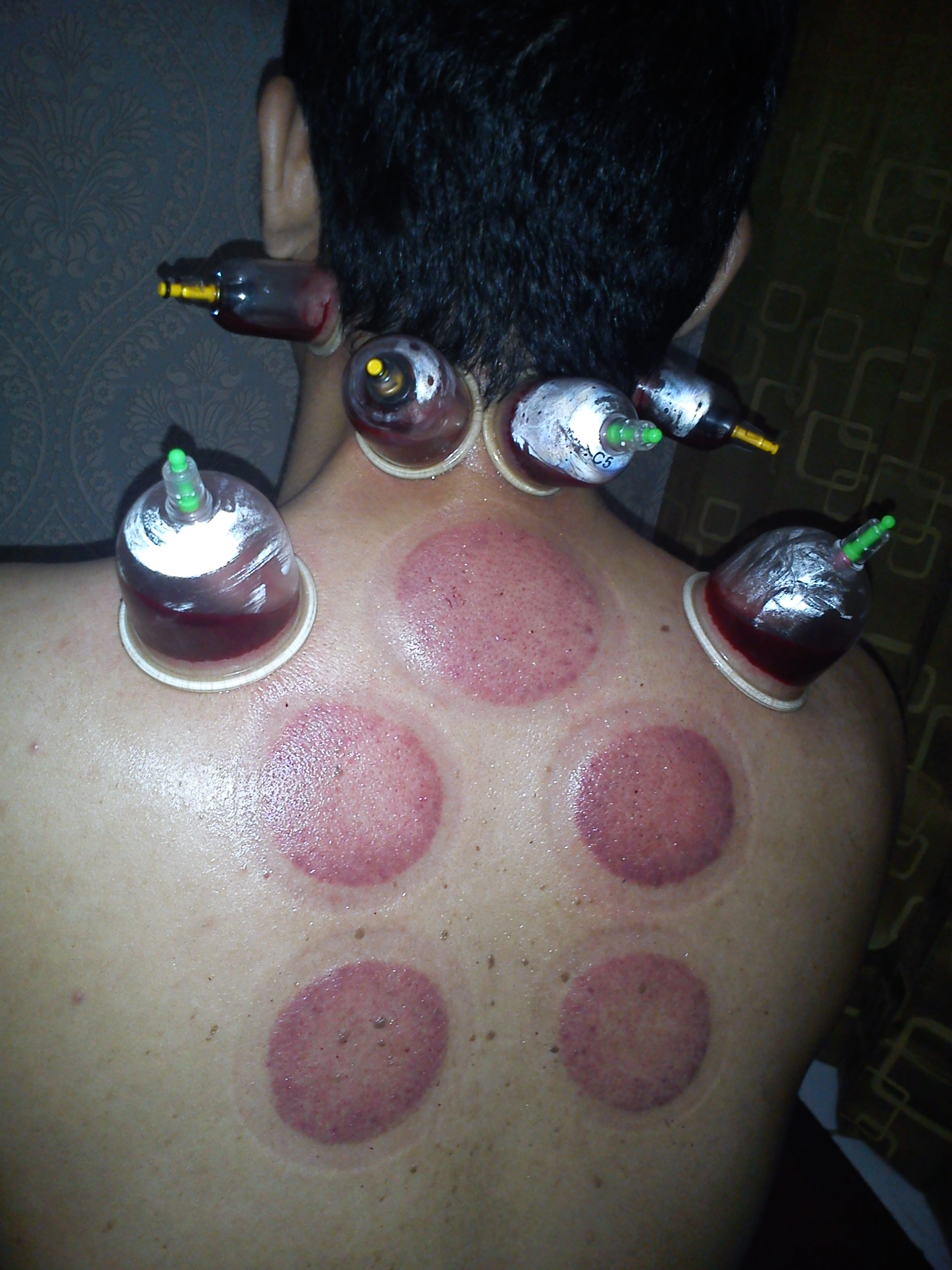
A person receiving wet cupping

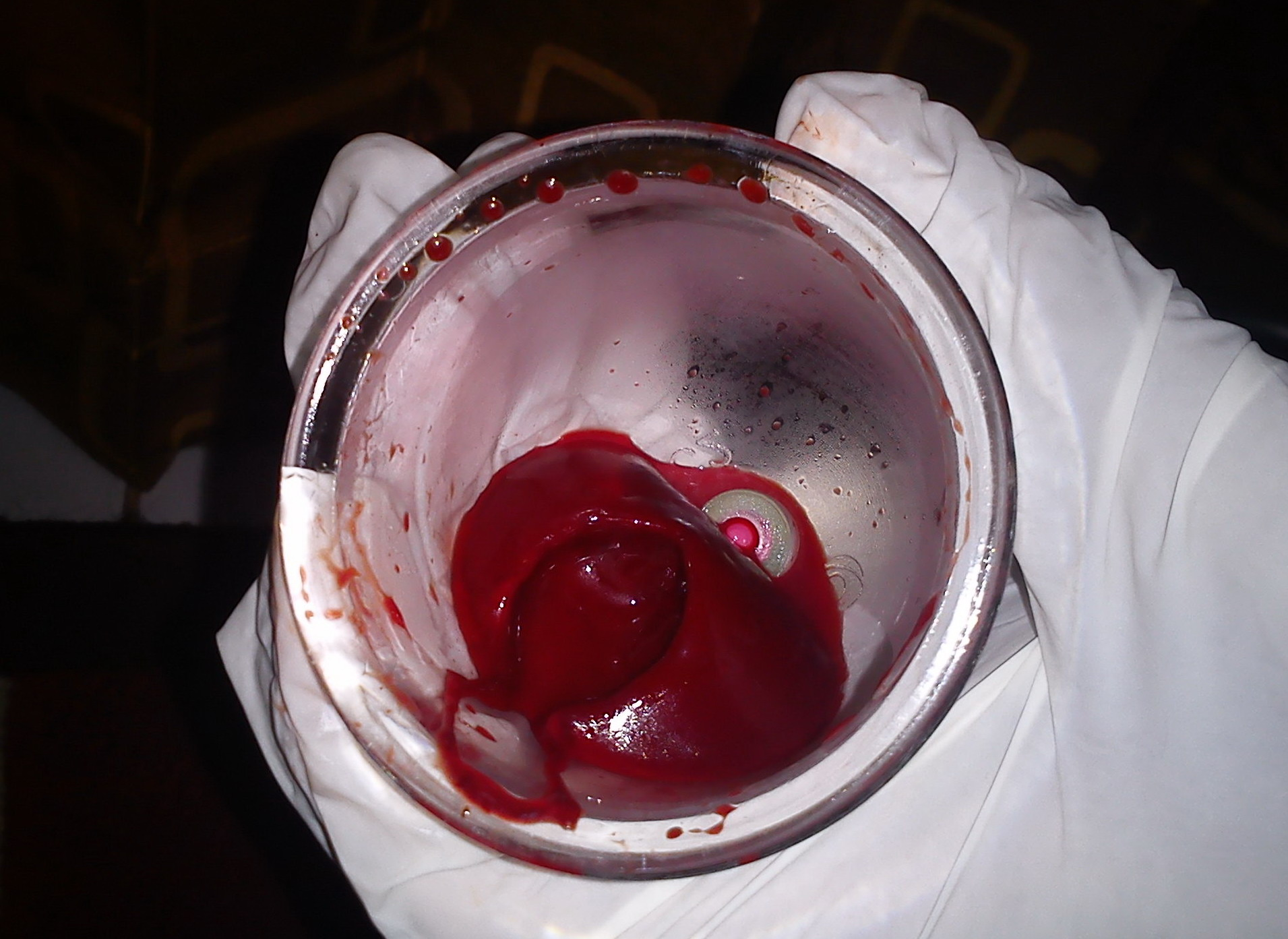
Blood drawn by wet cupping

=== Traditional Chinese medicine ===
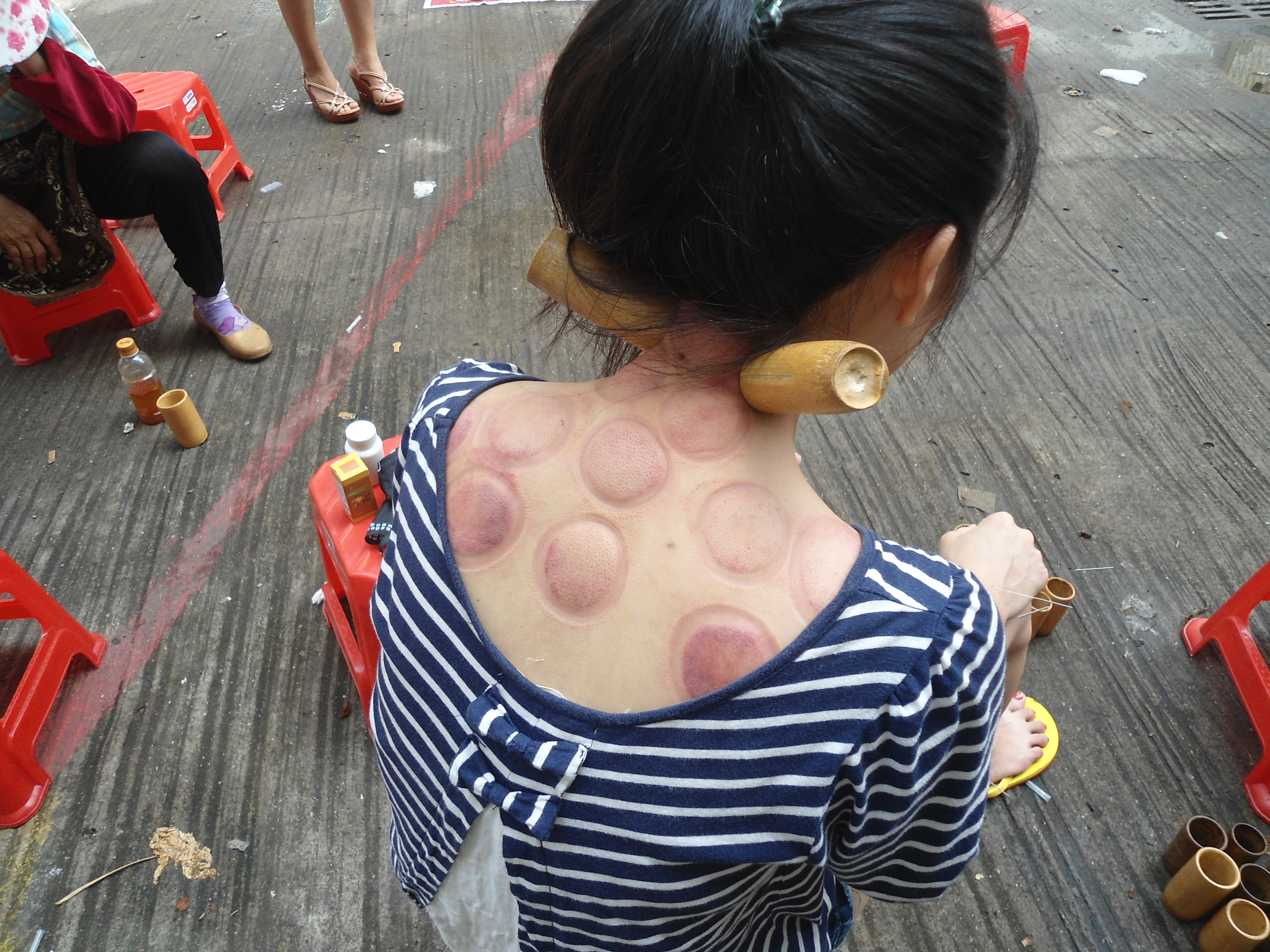
Woman receiving fire cupping at a roadside business in Haikou, Hainan, China

In Chinese, cupping is known as "pulling-up jars" (Chinese: 拔罐; pinyin: báguàn). According to traditional Chinese medicine (TCM), cupping is done to dispel stagnation (stagnant blood and lymph), thereby improving qi flow, to treat respiratory diseases such as the common cold, pneumonia and bronchitis. Cupping is used on the back, neck, shoulder, and other musculoskeletal conditions. Its advocates claim it has other applications as well. Cupping is not advised, in TCM, over skin ulcers or to the abdominal or sacral regions of pregnant women.

== Society and culture ==
Cupping has gained publicity in modern times due to its use by American sport celebrities including National Football League player DeMarcus Ware, National Basketball Association star Shaquille O'Neal, Olympians Alex Naddour, Natalie Coughlin, and Michael Phelps and tennis player Ben Shelton. Medical doctor Brad McKay wrote that Team USA was doing a great disservice to their fans who might "follow their lead", calling cupping an "ancient (but useless) traditional therapy." Steven Novella noted "It is unfortunate that elite athletics, including the Olympics, is such a hotbed for pseudoscience."

There is a description of cupping in George Orwell's essay "How the Poor Die", where he was surprised to find the antiquated practice applied to another patient in a Paris hospital. In the 1964 Hollywood film Zorba the Greek, cupping is depicted with the character Zorba, played by Anthony Quinn, performing it on the character played by Lila Kedrova.

The perceived benefits of cupping have often been perpetuated by celebrities and athletes who use these therapeutic interventions in their daily lives. Professional swimmer Michael Phelps received publicity during the 2016 Olympics for the purple bruises evident on his back resulting from cupping. He has been known to "do it before every meet he goes to to "speed up recovery". Celebrity endorsements such as these may bias individuals to feel benefits from the practice.

== See also ==
- Bloodletting
- Ear candling
- Gua sha
- List of ineffective cancer treatments
- Moxibustion
