= Asim Shahmalak =

British surgeon

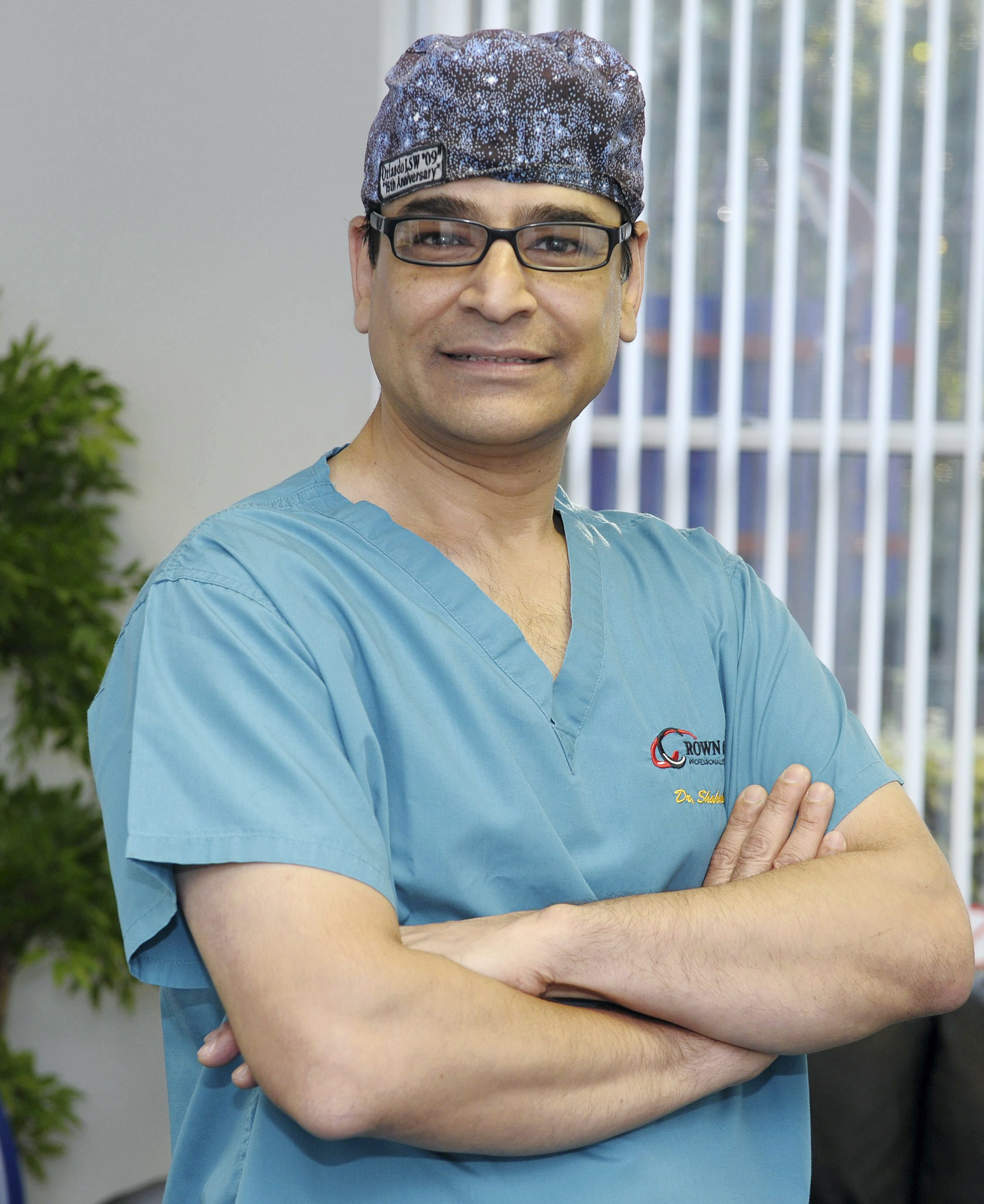
- Born: Asim Iqbal Shahmalak; 2 April 1961 (age 65); Karachi, Pakistan
- Occupations: Surgeon and broadcaster
- Television: Embarrassing Bodies

Asim Shahmalak (born 2 April 1961) is a British hair transplant surgeon and broadcaster.

Shahmalak began his career as a general surgeon in the Republic of Ireland in 1990, he joined the National Health Service (NHS) as a specialist doctor in general surgery in 2001, practising until 2011 when he dedicated himself full-time to private hair transplant surgery at his own Crown Clinic.

== Early life and career ==
Shahmalak was born 2 April 1961 in Karachi, Pakistan, the son of Hatimali Shahmalak and his wife Mehfooza Shahmalak. He was educated at St Bonaventure's High School, Sindh, before studying for his medical degree (MBBS) graduating at the Sindh Medical College, University of Karachi, Pakistan, in 1988. He trained as a general surgeon, moving to the Republic of Ireland in 1990 to take up a post as a Senior House Officer in General Surgery. In 1997 he qualified as a Specialist registrar in general surgery. He became a member of the Fellowship of the Royal College of Surgeons (FRCS) in 1995 before moving to the UK in 1996.

Shahmalak worked as a specialist doctor in General Surgery for the Warrington & Halton Hospitals NHS Foundation Trust between 2001 and 2011. He worked privately as a hair transplant surgeon for The Hospital Group from 2005 to 2007. He founded his own Crown Clinic in 2007 alongside work for the NHS and The Transform Medical Group (2007–10). In 2011 he left the NHS to devote himself full-time to hair restoration at the Crown Clinic in Manchester and Harley Street.

Shahmalak is a member of the International Society of Hair Restoration Surgery and takes an active part in the society's charitable initiative Operation Restore, which provides free surgery for patients suffering hair loss due to disease or trauma.

== Surgery ==
Shahmalak performed the UK's first eyelash transplant in 2009 using techniques pioneered in hair replacement surgery and for the victims of facial burns. He has helped pioneer eyebrow replacement surgery. and commented on the increasing popularity of so-called 'statement eyebrows', modelled on those of Catherine Middleton, now Catherine, Princess of Wales.

Shahmalak has treated a number of celebrity patients, including actor David Fleeshman, German soccer professional Dietmar Hamann, Homes Under The Hammer star Martin Roberts,

Shahamalak has spoken about how men should not undergo hair transplant surgery until they are over 25 and their pattern of hair loss has been established, telling the Sunday Mirror in the case of Wayne Rooney, not as patient,

"I'd never recommend surgery before the age of 25. If you start to go bald at a young age, the hair loss is usually more severe. I believe Wayne Rooney had a transplant too early, he'll need further surgery to maintain a good head of hair."

== Voluntary work in Pakistan ==
Since 2013, Shahmalak has been travelling to Pakistan to help the victims of acid attacks. In 2014, Granada Television broadcast a report on the surgeon's self-funded trips to Karachi - with a team from the Crown Clinic - to perform surgery on women disfigured in assaults by ex-lovers, jealous friends or obsessive stalkers. Shahmalak carried out eyebrow restoration and hair transplants in addition to pioneering operations to replace eyelashes. The surgeon - who is reported to be only one of nine professionals in the world qualified to perform the surgery - also provided training for local doctors in order that they, in turn, can support other victims. His work, which is carried out in association with the charitable Smile Again Foundation set up by former beauty therapist Masarrat Misbah, has helped victims such as 27-year-old Kanwal Qayum, who was doused in acid as she slept by a friend envious of her new job as an air hostess. Another victim, Kanwal Ashar, had surgery to replace her eyebrows and eyelashes after being attacked by a man she refused to marry. "I was devastated to hear these stories," explained Shahmalak. "I had tears in my eyes. How could one person do this to another? It is beyond belief." According to the Granada report, prospective patients had travelled hundreds of miles - some on little more than donkey carts - just for the chance to get a consultation. However, Shahmalak found that more than half of the women had to be turned away because their scarring was so bad, surgery would not work. "It is heartbreaking," added the surgeon. Shahmalak's pioneering work in the region has been covered by ITV's Good Morning Britain, ITN News and Granada TV among others. He was voted Man Of The Year at the North West's Fusion Awards in recognition of his efforts. He continues to travel regularly to Pakistan - where there are around 300 acid attacks each year - in order to help victims. Writing in The Times, journalist Carol Midgley described it as an "outstandingly generous, life-affirming act".

In 2017, Shahmalak was interviewed by the BBC's Jane Hill about his charitable work in Pakistan and the spate of acid attacks in the UK.

Early in 2018, Shahmalak returned to Pakistan to operate on more victims of acid attacks and his charitable trip was covered by the BBC on North West Tonight where he was interviewed by presenter Annabel Tiffin. He performed eyelash transplants on two women as part of their facial reconstructions at a hospital in Karachi.

== Other projects ==
Shahmalak has written for newspapers and blogs including the Manchester Evening News, and Huffington Post. Shahmalak is a donor and supporter of Operation Restore, a charitable programme run by non-profit medical association the International Society of Hair Restoration Surgery (ISHRS) to help burns and cancer victims who cannot afford treatment.

Shahmalak is involved in an ongoing hair follicle research programme in collaboration with staff at the University of Manchester. The research group, headed by Professor Ralf Paus, investigates the biology and pathology of the hair follicle as a microcosmic miniorgan in which many of the fundamental problems of biology can be studied in an exemplary fashion. Current research includes investigations into the neuroendocrine properties of the human hair follicle, their impact on mitochondrial function and hair follicle immune status, and the use of adult stem cells populations associated with human skin appendages for regenerative medicine purposes. In May 2018, the results of Dr Paus's research were published by PLOS Biology showing that a drug originally designed as a treatment for osteoporosis has a dramatic stimulatory effect on human hair follicles donated by patients undergoing hair transplantation surgery. Shahmalak was thanked by the research team for providing scalp hair follicles from more than 40 patients.

He is a frequent media spokesman, and has written about the importance placed in hair over the centuries and the fact that baldness until recently was not recognised as a social or medical issue, despite the sometimes catastrophic impact it can have on confidence and mental well-being. He wrote: "Male pattern baldness (MPB), the main cause of hair loss, affects an estimated quarter of men by the age of 30 and two thirds by the age of 60. Until recently, the impact baldness might have on confidence and well-being was little understood or recognised by the medical profession at large."

Shahmalak has also written about the impact of work stress and pressure on hair colour and density, highlighting the example of US President Barack Obama and leading UK politicians whose lifestyles have been reflected in their looks. Writing in the Huffington Post he concluded: "These very visible physical manifestations of stress are not simply a gift to the world's picture editors, and hair transplant surgeons like myself. They are an outward indicator of the internal difficulties of leadership in the modern world. And Obama is not the first powerful man – and it is mainly men affected in this way – whose hair has suffered and signalled the strains of his job."

Writing in the Manchester Evening News (31 October 2012), Shahmalak praised celebrities such as footballer Wayne Rooney and Calum Best who have spoken publicly about their hair transplants, and decried public criticism of them as "gloomily familiar". He wrote:

"Reading the comments on various newspaper message boards, it struck me how unforgiving many people remain about a young man like Calum who decides to have hair transplant surgery. So why is wanting to save his hair so controversial? And why is the public debate still so blinkered against men like Calum, and Wayne Rooney who admit to having had treatment?"

He added: "Of course there is nothing wrong with baldness. I know many men, friends of mine in fact, who are proud to be bald. They wear their shaven heads as a badge of masculinity. But choice is everything."

Shahmalak is a director for UK & Northern Europe for FUE Europe. In May 2017, at the sixth FUE Europe Congress in Ankara, Turkey, he performed live surgery on a patient. Shahmalak will be hosting the 8th annual FUE Europe Conference in Manchester, including a live surgical workshop at Crown Clinic, in 2019.

In May 2018, Shahmalak was appointed President of The Trichological Society, dedicated to orthodox hair science and hair specialisms, for a two-year period.

== Broadcasting ==
- Embarrassing Bodies on Channel 4
- BBC Radio Manchester.
- BBC News.
- ITV News.
- Granada Reports.
- BBC World Service.
- Good Morning Britain.
- BBC North West Tonight.
- BBC Asian Network.
- The Times UK.
