= Drugs Live =

British TV documentary series

- Presented by: Jon Snow, Christian Jessen
- Country of origin: United Kingdom
- No. of episodes: 2

Production
- Running time: 60 minutes

Original release
- Network: Channel 4
- Release: 26 September 2012 – 3 March 2015

Drugs Live is an occasional British television documentary on Channel 4 about recreational drug use, and clinical trials into its effects, presented by Jon Snow and Dr Christian Jessen.

== Format ==
The show consisted of a one-hour debate, interspersed with explanations of brain-chemistry using a giant luminous brain, footage of a veteran raver taking ecstasy and dancing until 5 am, and interviews with three students.

=== Ecstasy Trial ===
The first programme Drugs Live: The Ecstasy Trial was broadcast in two parts on 26 and 27 September 2012, about MDMA. The main guests were Professor Valerie Curran and Professor David Nutt. Curran and Nutt oversaw research at Imperial College London in which volunteers took part in a double blind study in which some took 83 mg of MDMA, some took vitamin C, and others a placebo. Participants had their brains scanned using a functional magnetic resonance imaging brain scanner whilst scientists asked them questions about their mood and memory.

Five of the 25 volunteers from the trial appeared in the studio to recant their experience.

The participants were not chosen at random. Among the participants were an ordained priest who, despite reporting feelings of euphoria claimed she felt disconnected from God; the novelist Lionel Shriver who felt the dose was too low and a retired SAS soldier who became paranoid and felt so bad the next day that he had to spend the afternoon in bed.

=== Cannabis Trial ===
The second programme Drugs Live: The Cannabis Trial was broadcast on 3 March 2015.

The show consisted of journalists Jon Snow, Mattew Parris and Jennie Bond taking part in what channel four dubbed "a groundbreaking scientific trial". Participants tried two different forms of Cannabis (drug), Skunk and Hash.

Jon Snow reported being "overwhelmingly frightened" while Matthew Paris stated that "Smoking skunk wasn't cool". Jenny Bond, on the other hand, stated: "The fact that I was perhaps hallucinating slightly was quite nice really, it was a very floaty feeling."

Channel four filmed the studio trials before airing the show. However, the show did feature a live studio audience with varying views on cannabis. The panel briefly touched upon the drug's influence on music with one audience member stating, "A lot of my favourite music is doom and that came from (Black) Sabbath's vibe on cannabis."
