= Sex in Court =

- Genre: Factual/Entertainment
- Country of origin: United Kingdom
- Original language: English
- No. of episodes: 7

Production
- Production location: London
- Running time: Approximately 30 minutes

Original release
- Network: E4
- Release: 29 March – 10 May 2007

Sex in Court is a British factual entertainment series which premiered on E4 on 29 March 2007.

It takes a look at bedroom politics within modern relationships. The pilot features mother of two Rachel, who brings her husband Guy to court over a clash of lovemaking styles. Each episode sees people put on trial by their partner, or ex-partner. In a formal, court-like atmosphere, each party will be thoroughly cross-examined by a judge. Due to its nature E4 aired this programme after the watershed. The theme of the programme is very similar to Playboy TV's Sex Court.

== Episode guide ==
=== Episode 1: 29 March 2007 ===
- Rachel v Guy – Guy is obsessed with anal sex. – Guilty
  - Sentence: Anal sex banned for a month and lubricant must be used.
- Joanna v Ashley – Ashley has been secretly filming himself and Joanna having sex and showing this video to his mates.. – Guilty
  - Sentence: Deletion of video and Ashley must ask for consent if he wishes to do it again.

=== Episode 2: 5 April 2007 ===
- Whinnie v Themba – Whinnie is accused of unfair denial of cunnilingus. – Not Guilty
  - Sentence: Themba must never pressure Whinnie into performing cunnilingus, and Whinnie was given some aids to help her explore her own body.
- Marco v Anna – Marco watches porn while having sex with Anna and he refuses to let her watch too.. – Guilty
  - Sentence: Banning of pornography while having sex until Anna is ready to reintroduce it, and she must take part.

=== Episode 3: 12 April 2007 ===
- Ilian v Louisa – Unfair refusal to reciprocate oral sex. – Guilty
  - Sentence: Louisa is sent on fellatio course.
- Lauren v Ian – Ian makes non-stop demands for early morning sex. – Guilty
  - Sentence: Ban on morning sex and Ian most not wake Lauren if he decides to wake up to stop himself from wanting sex.

=== Episode 4: 19 April 2007 ===
- Lee v Keeley – Unreasonable refusal to dress up for sex. – Guilty
  - Sentence: She must make Lee's fantasy come true.
- Nathan v Emmy – Unreasonable refusal to allow semen on body and face. – Not Guilty
  - Sentence: Nathan must abide by Emmy's rules.

=== Episode 5: 26 April 2007 ===
- Liddy v Bobby – Rebuffal of sexual advances. – Not Guilty
  - Sentence: They are rewarded with a night at a hotel, away from Bobby's parents house.
- Laura v Chris – Excessive demands for sex. – Not Guilty
  - Sentence: They must come to some sort of compromise.

=== Episode 6: 3 May 2007 ===
- Jenny v Matt – Unfair refusal to indulge in sexual fantasy. – Not Guilty
  - Sentence: None.
- Greg v Lucy – Inconsiderate possession and use of vibrator. – Not Guilty
  - Sentence: None.

=== Episode 7: 10 May 2007 ===
- Joanne v Nick – Treating sex as a joke. – Guilty
  - Sentence: Jokes must be stopped and Nick sent on a sex course so he can satisfy Joanne for longer.
- Dawn v Dave – Unfair withholding of dominant bedroom behaviour. – Not Guilty
  - Sentence: None.
