= Brad McKay (doctor) =

Australian medical doctor and TV presenter

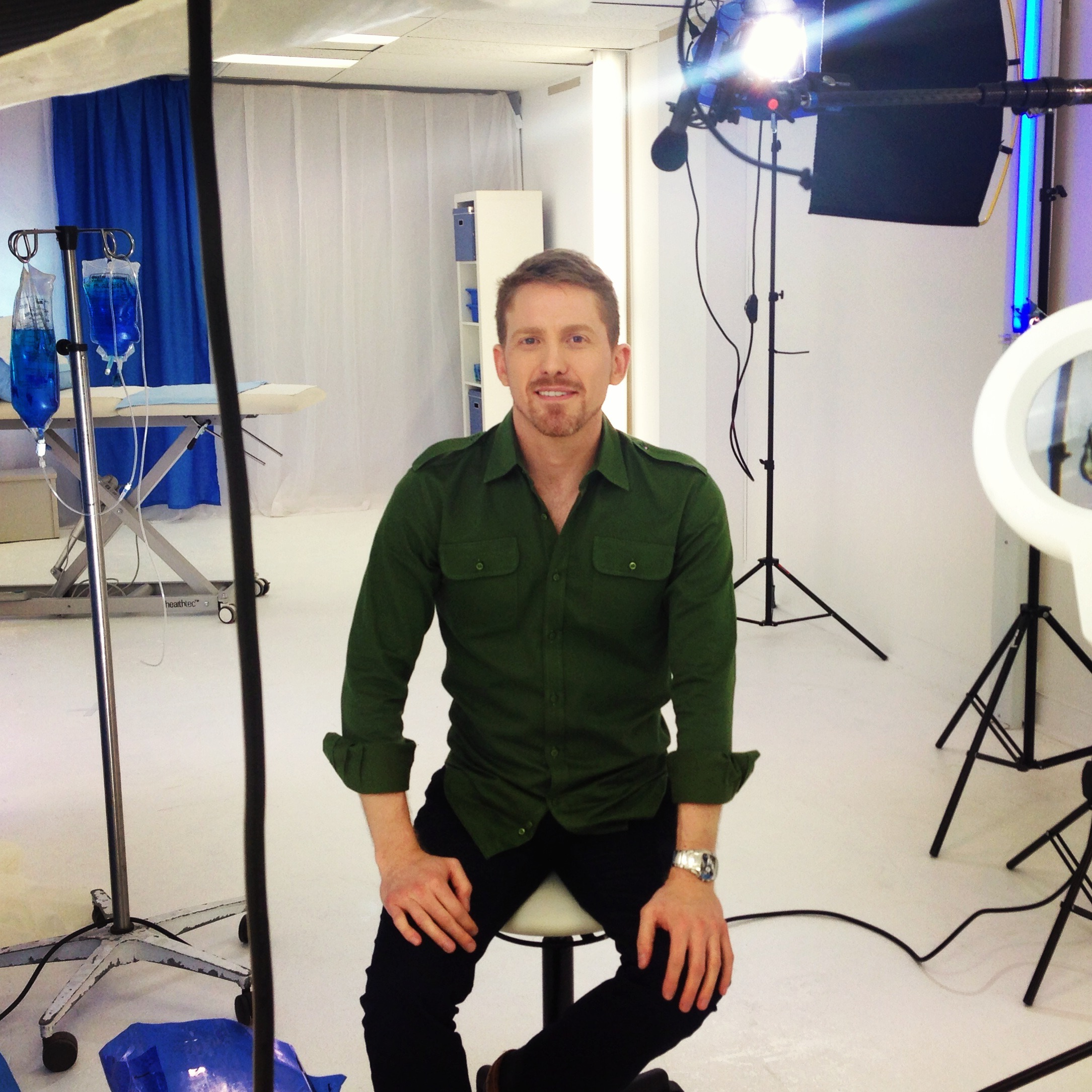
- On the set of Embarrassing Bodies Down Under
- Born: Lower Hutt, New Zealand
- Education: Monash University
- Occupations: Doctor; science communicator; author; presenter
- Known for: Today, Embarrassing Bodies Down Under

Brad McKay is a New Zealand-born Australian doctor, science communicator and author. He is best known for his television series Embarrassing Bodies Down Under, which was broadcast in 2013. He is also a regular guest on numerous Australian television and radio programs including Today.

He is a practicing General Practitioner in the inner Sydney suburb of Darlinghurst.

== Early life and education ==
McKay was born and grew up in Lower Hutt, New Zealand. He moved to Australia as a teen, and studied at Monash University

== Career ==
After graduating from university, McKay began work at a clinic in Melbourne. He has worked with remote Aboriginal communities in New South Wales. In 2014, he began working at East Sydney Doctors in Sydney.

McKay's first television role was as a commentator on The Project. He then started making regular appearances on Today and Today Extra.

In 2013, he hosted Embarrassing Bodies Down Under on Lifestyle You, a factual television program that explores embarrassing medical issues. The series was an Australian version of the UK show, Embarrassing Bodies. The show was also hosted by Christian Jessen who hosts the UK version of the program, Ginni Mansberg, and Sam Hay. In 2015 the show was broadcast on the Nine Network.

In 2015, McKay started regular radio segments on ABC Radio Sydney, ABC Radio Hobart, Nightlife, 2UE, and 3AW Melbourne.

In 2016, McKay began writing regularly for News.com.au.

In addition to his regular commitments, Dr Brad has appeared as health expert on many Australian radio and television programmes including Studio 10, Nine News, Triple J, Sky News Australia, 10 News First, and ABC News.

== Personal life ==
Growing up in New Zealand, McKay was raised by religious parents who taught to never question a doctor's opinion and frequently used prayer when dealing with medical issues.

He is openly gay and lives with his partner in Sydney. He is an atheist and humanist. He has spoken in the past about the fact that he grew up in a very religious household.

McKay is a committee member of the Australian Skeptics and has said he is committed to keeping evidence based science in medicine. He caused a minor controversy in his home country of New Zealand when he publicly denounced former All Black Sonny Bill Williams for his use of hijama cupping.

== Books ==
- McKay, Brad (2021). Fake Medicine. Australia: Hachette. ISBN 9780733646867. OCLC 1227692115.

An article written in Skeptical Inquirer, Susan Gerbic reviews McKay's book Fake Medicine: Exposing the Wellness Crazes, Cons and Quacks Costing Us Our Health. During his teenage years, McKay had a medical condition which hurt his backside, causing him to go to the doctor, then a physiotherapist and an osteopath. Then McKay's parents decided to invoke the help of God when surgery time came. After this, we follow McKay through many doctors trying to diagnose a medical mystery which is revealed in the end. Throughout the book, McKay discusses the phenomenon of Dr. Google, which he says has positives and negatives with patients trying to diagnose themselves, and a variety of alternative treatments including vitamins, cupping therapy, and naturopathy. McKay uses real-life experiences adding a touch of personal history to lead readers along the diagnoses ending with the problems science communicators face with such as media pushing a false balance.
