= Freaky Eaters (American TV program) =

- Genre: Documentary
- Presented by: Mike Dow; J.J. Virgin
- Narrated by: Josh Artis
- Country of origin: United States
- Original language: English
- No. of seasons: 2
- No. of episodes: 14

Production
- Camera setup: Single-camera
- Running time: 22–24 minutes
- Production company: Shed Media

Original release
- Network: TLC
- Release: September 5, 2010 – June 26, 2011

Related
- Freaky Eaters

Freaky Eaters is an American documentary television program based on the BBC program of the same name that aired on TLC. It was hosted by psychotherapist Mike Dow, and co-hosted by nutrition specialist J.J. Virgin. The program aired over two seasons, from September 5, 2010 to June 26, 2011. It never returned for a third season and was abruptly cancelled in the spring of 2011, with the last episode airing on June 26, 2011.

== Synopsis ==
The program deals with people who have bizarre addictions to food and/or eating disorders. Like the BBC program it is based on, each episode is titled with the words "Addicted to" and then whatever the food is. The program's first episode aired on September 5, 2010. Psychotherapist Mike Dow and nutritionist J.J. Virgin host the program. Voiceover actor Josh Artis is the program's narrator. At the end of most episodes, the people get help and most of the time stop their addictions and live healthier lifestyles.

== Episodes ==
=== Series overview ===
Season	Episodes	Originally released	
Season	Episodes	First released	Last released
1	6	September 5, 2010	September 19, 2010
2	8	June 5, 2011	June 26, 2011

=== Season 1 (2010) ===
No. overall	No. in season	Title	Original release date
1	1	"Addicted to Cheeseburgers"	September 5, 2010
Victor Munoz only eats cheeseburgers and is afraid of other foods. He is later cured when he eats fish at a barbecue. According to the epilogue, he hasn't eaten a single cheeseburger since.
2	2	"Addicted to Sugar"	September 5, 2010
Christine Wieser only eats sugar including soda, candy, ice cream, and cake. They later cure her of the addiction.
3	3	"Addicted to Pizza"	September 12, 2010
Josh Tulcan has only eaten pizza since third grade. He's cured when at a restaurant he eats shrimp while his brother eats pizza. According to the epilogue he hasn't eaten pizza as a staple food since.
4	4	"Addicted to Fries"	September 12, 2010
Amber Scott only eats french fries, and her daughter, McCartney is following in her footsteps. They are both cured after eating cucumbers and she no longer eats fries as a staple food.
5	5	"Addicted to Raw Meat"	September 19, 2010
29-year-old Daniel Perkins, a writer raised in a strict military household, eats raw meat and is in danger of getting a parasite. He is later cured of eating raw meat and starts eating cooked meat.
6	6	"Addicted to Cola"	September 19, 2010
Amy Mendelovich, a Russian-born woman, has been eating junk food and drinking 30 cans of cola a day every since she came to America. Despite having a health scare where she found a lump, which was linked to her cola consumption, she was in denial about her addiction and refused to slow down her consumption, and according to the epilogue, she still drinks more than 24 cans of cola a day. She later appeared on Dr. Phil and revealed that she still drinks cola, but doesn't drink nearly as much as she used to. Eventually, she posted a video on YouTube in 2018, which stated that she dropped cola from her diet all together.

=== Season 2 (2011) ===
No. overall	No. in season	Title	Original release date
7	1	"Addicted to Corn starch"	June 5, 2011
Nikki Miles is addicted to eating cornstarch, usually consuming it straight from the box or bags. She gets help and is cured of her addiction.
8	2	"Addicted to Cheesy Potatoes"	June 5, 2011
34-year-old Kelly compulsively eats cheesy potatoes. In the end she seeks help and stops eating cheesy potatoes. She eats a wider variety of food and tries to get fit.
9	3	"Addicted to Tartar Sauce"	June 12, 2011
36-year-old Misty is obsessed with tartar sauce, consuming up to 40 gallons a year. In the end, she gets help and is cured.
10	4	"Addicted to Meat"	June 12, 2011
Michael Khein is an extreme carnivore who mainly consumes meat for most of his meals, which adds up to about 1800 lbs per year. Although he still eats meat, he also includes at least one vegetable.
11	5	"Addicted to Liquids"	June 19, 2011
Whitney Bishop lives on a strict liquid diet and usually spits out chewed up food into cups, which causes her daughter, Kiersten, to mimic her diet. Her diet stems from an incident where she choked on a piece of steak. She is cured and now swallows all foods and does not use a spit cup anymore as well as Kiersten.
12	6	"Addicted to Maple Syrup"	June 19, 2011
A Hispanic American Daniel is addicted to maple syrup and usually puts it on any food he eats. With a history of diabetes running in his family, Daniel gets help and is cured of his addiction.
13	7	"Addicted to Ice Cream Bars"	June 26, 2011
Kimberley is addicted to ice-cream bars, eating up to 40 per day, an addiction resulting from a previous divorce. She gets help and is cured of her addiction.
14	8	"Addicted to French Fries"	June 26, 2011
Eric Willmann only eats french fries and refuses to eat other foods, usually gagging as a result of trying other foods. He is later cured of his addiction and hasn't eaten french fries as a staple food since.
