= Freaky Eaters (British TV programme) =

- Created by: betty tv
- Presented by: Natalie Savona; Benjamin Fry; Pixie McKenna; Stephen Briers
- Narrated by: Jill Halfpenny (series 1); Sharon Horgan (series 2)
- Country of origin: United Kingdom
- No. of episodes: 24

Production
- Running time: 60 mins

Original release
- Network: BBC Three
- Release: 14 February 2007 – 7 April 2009

Freaky Eaters is a British factual television programme produced by independent television production company betty for BBC Three. Broadcast dates were February–March 2007 (Series 1), February–April 2008 (Series 2), and February–April 2009 (Series 3). Series 1 was narrated by the actress Jill Halfpenny and Series 2 by Sharon Horgan.

== Synopsis ==
Each episode focuses on an individual with some form of eating disorder, often a selective eating disorder (an extremely restricted diet, often to the point of avoiding entire food groups), or food neophobia.

With the help of a team of specialist experts, techniques are employed to help the person overcome their eating problems and develop more healthy diets.

In Series 1, the specialist experts were nutritionist Natalie Savona and psychological coach Benjamin Fry. In Series 2 psychologist Dr. Stephen Briers took over from Benjamin Fry. In Series 3, Charlotte Watts took over as nutritionist and Felix Economakis as the psychological coach. Dr. Pixie McKenna adopted the role of programme doctor across all three series.

== Episodes ==
=== Series 1 ===
1. Addicted to Crisps and Pizza (Kevin Johnson)
2. Addicted to Chips (Sarah Dolby)
3. Addicted to Cheese (Dave Nunley)
4. Addicted to Spaghetti hoops (Adrian England)
5. Addicted to Chocolate (Rachel Renton)
6. Addicted to Junk Food (Debbie Ezeogu)
7. Addicted to Junk Food 2 (Martyn Sadd)

=== Series 2 ===
1. Addicted to Burnt Sausages (Natalie Holland)
2. Addicted to Junk Food (radio presenter Chris Hawkins)
3. Addicted to Meat (Pete Turner)
4. Addicted to Bread (Joanne Stappard)
5. Addicted to Meat and Potatoes (Kerry Singleton)
6. Addicted to Biscuits (Andrew Forster)
7. Addicted to Potatoes (Joanne Adams)
8. Addicted to Pasta (Helen Tree)
9. Addicted to Cheese (Kate Silk)

=== Series 3 ===
1. Addicted to Bacon and Burgers (Niquita Hartshorn)
2. Addicted to Cheese (Vicki Zukiewicz)
3. Addicted to Beans and chips (Tom Bull)
4. Addicted to Brown Sauce (Jamie Davidson)
5. Addicted to Chips (Dave Wheatley)
6. Addicted to Diet Cola (Katie Walker)
7. Addicted to Yorkshire puddings (Aaron Saunders)
8. Addicted to Meat (Richard Smart)

== Cancellation ==
The show was cancelled by the BBC in April 2010. On the Richard Bacon BBC Radio 5 Live show in December 2010, Harry Hill, who had regularly lampooned Freaky Eaters on Harry Hill's TV Burp, stated he had been told by a producer of Freaky Eaters that his coverage of the show was the reason it had been commissioned for a second and third series.

== American edition ==
Freaky Eaters spawned an American edition that aired on TLC from September 2010 to June 2011.
