= Ginni Mansberg =

Australian television presenter (born 1968)

- Born: Sydney, Australia
- Education: University of Newcastle
- Occupations: Doctor, science communicator, author
- Known for: Sunrise, Embarrassing Bodies Down Under, Medicine or Myth

Ginni Mansberg (born 1968 in Sydney, Australia) is an Australian General Practitioner and television presenter. She is best known for her frequent appearances on Channel Seven's morning TV shows Sunrise and The Morning Show, and as the co-host of Embarrassing Bodies Down Under, which was broadcast in 2013.

She is a practising GP in Sans Souci in Sydney.

== Education ==
Mansberg studied medicine at the University of Newcastle.

== Career ==
In addition to being a physician, she has also worked in the media as a columnist, author, and former political advisor to Joe Hockey for a year who was then shadow minister for health and ageing.

She was the co-author (with Anne Thomson) of the book Why Am I So Tired? She is also the medical advisor for the magazines Practical Parenting and Women's Health.

In 2013, she hosted Embarrassing Bodies Down Under on Lifestyle You, a factual television program that explores embarrassing medical issues. The series was an Australian version of the UK show, Embarrassing Bodies. The show was also hosted by Christian Jessen who hosts the UK version of the program, Brad McKay, and Sam Hay. In 2015 the show was broadcast on the Nine Network.

In 2019, it was announced that she was going to be a judge on a new SBS program Medicine or Myth alongside Charlie Teo.

== Books ==
- Mansberg, Ginni (2020). The M Word: How to thrive in menopause. Australia: Murdoch Books. ISBN 9781760524876. OCLC 1121604310.

== Personal life ==
Mansberg is divorced and a mother to 6 children.
