= Doctor, Doctor (talk show) =

Doctor, Doctor is a live talk show broadcast on British television on Channel 5 starting in 2005, and hosted by co-presenters Mark Porter (who is also a general practitioner) and Raj Persaud (who is also a psychiatrist). It was produced by Princess Productions.

== Overview ==
The television program comprises several educational sections to present medical and health information in slightly different formats to match different supporting resources. It includes a presentation on a common illness or conditions with audiovisual aids, an interview with a guest celebrity (or celebrities) who talk about an illness that they have suffered from (or had personal experience of), discussion between the presenters and a guest medical (or paramedical) expert to give added insight to a selected medical topic, and a live phone-in when the television doctors answer viewers' telephone questions and a few e-mail questions.

Doctor, Doctor was shown when Five's major morning show, The Wright Stuff, was taking a break from broadcasting.
