= Pixie McKenna =

Irish physician and television personality (born 1971)

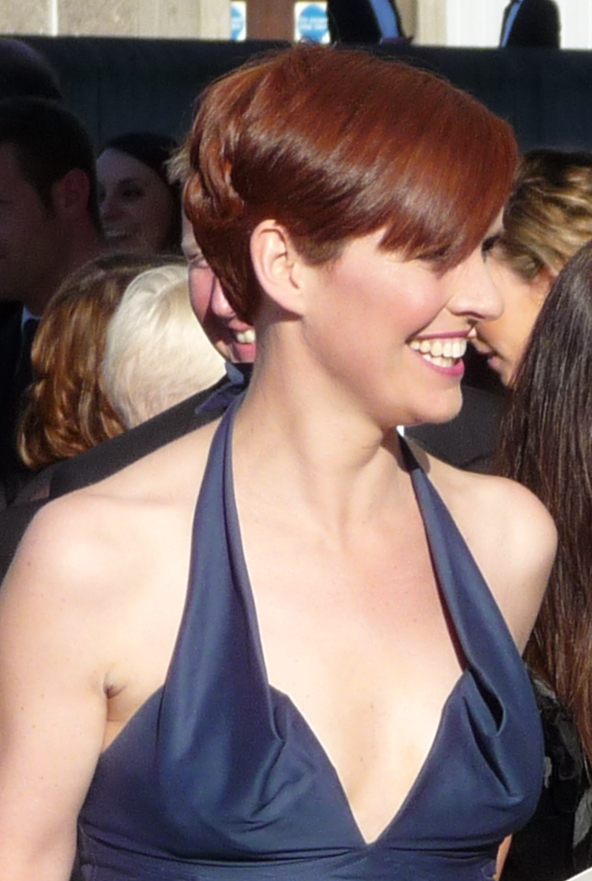
McKenna at the British Academy Television Awards 2009

Bernadette Anne McKenna (born 20 January 1971) also known as Dr. Pixie McKenna, is an Irish physician and television personality. She runs a clinic in Cork, Ireland and is best known for her work on the Channel 4 series Embarrassing Illnesses and its successor series Embarrassing Bodies and BBC Three's Freaky Eaters.

== Education and training ==
Born in Ireland, McKenna attended medical school at the University College Cork, graduating in 1995.

After qualifying as a general practitioner in 1999, McKenna moved to the UK and practised in Notting Hill, London for three years. She then set up a GP practice in Ireland while continuing sessional work at Harley Street. In the public sector, she acts as a clinical assistant in sexual health and dermatology for the NHS and has worked at a number of London teaching hospitals.

== Television and radio career ==
In 2007, McKenna began to appear on Freaky Eaters, a show which helps individuals overcome eating disorders. That same year she went on to co-present Embarrassing Illnesses, a show which highlights common conditions that people are reluctant to discuss with their doctors, and in 2008 co-presented with Christian Jessen its sister series Embarrassing Bodies. This has, on numerous occasions, led her onto The Ray D'Arcy Show on Today FM to discuss the various embarrassing illnesses endured by the programme's listeners.
