= Embarrassing Bodies =

Reality TV show

- Current opening title sequence introduced in 2010
- Genre: Medical
- Presented by: Pixie McKenna; Dawn Harper; Christian Jessen; James Russell; Jane Leonard; Anand Patel; Tosin Ajayi-Sotubo
- Narrated by: Ashley Jensen
- Country of origin: United Kingdom
- Original language: English
- No. of series: 8

Production
- Executive producers: Sarah Eglin; Steph Harris; Dan Jones
- Running time: 60 minutes (inc. adverts)
- Production company: Maverick Television

Original release
- Network: Channel 4
- Release: 2007 – present

Embarrassing Bodies (formerly Embarrassing Illnesses) is a British BAFTA Award-winning medical reality television programme broadcast by Channel 4 and made by Maverick Television since 2007. In 2011, an hour-long live show was introduced, "Embarrassing Bodies: Live from the Clinic", which makes use of Skype technology. Various spin-offs have been produced in relation to the programme to target different patients, such as Embarrassing Fat Bodies and Embarrassing Teenage Bodies. The series' basic premise involves members of the public with a wide variety of medical conditions consulting the show's doctors for advice; in some cases, cosmetic or corrective surgery has been offered and undertaken to treat patients with more severe or noticeable ailments. The commissioning editors were Adam Gee and Kate Teckman.

The show was revived in 2022, with the new series debuted on 19 May 2022 featuring a new cast of doctors.

== Format ==
Throughout its numerous series, Embarrassing Bodies has set out to aid people who have a variety of medical issues. These issues tend to be taboo or misunderstood. With the help of its patients and the diagnoses of its doctors, the show tries to make common medical issues—especially those that are "embarrassing" or sexual—understood, and to debunk myths surrounding them. The programme's method of tackling these issues has caused great success and has attracted large numbers of people to its website.

=== Presenters ===
Name	Series
Christian Jessen	2007–2015
Dawn Harper	2007–2015
Pixie McKenna	2007–2015
James Russell	2012
Jane Leonard	2022
Anand Patel	2022
Tosin Ajayi-Sotubo	2022

Numerous specialist doctors have appeared regularly throughout the show, such as Asim Shahmalak who appeared on the show to talk about and demonstrate his hair transplant techniques. Mr Shaw Somers, a specialist gastrointestinal and bariatric surgeon, would regularly discuss obesity and also perform surgery on patients with obesity-related diseases during Embarrassing Bodies as well as Embarrassing Fat Bodies.

On a show about sleepwalking, one of the programme consultants was psychologist and cognitive behavioral therapist Becky Spelman.

== Series ==
As the show grew in popularity, Embarrassing Bodies created a common theme throughout some of its series, dedicating whole series to a certain group of society, such as children, overweight people and teenagers. Series 3 saw the return of the mobile clinic, a common setting for the show. It also saw the beginning of Embarrassing Bodies: Back to the Clinic, which would see ex-patients from the series returning to the clinic to discuss how life has been since their last visit. Series 4 started with a special episode, which saw the team based in Spain.

The fourteenth episode of Series 5 saw a one-hour live special, during which patients would send in pictures or videos via email, social media or Skype and specialist doctors would try to diagnose the issue and then follow-up the patients. The final episode of Series 6 was dedicated to cancer and was entitled Stand Up to Cancer. Series 7 consisted of three specials named The Man With Half a Face, Penis Special and The 36-Stone Woman.

=== Main series ===
Series	Name	Episodes
1	Embarrassing Illnesses	4
2	Embarrassing Bodies	12
3	Embarrassing Bodies & Embarrassing Bodies: Kids	17
4	Embarrassing Bodies & Embarrassing Bodies: Teen Special	26
5	Embarrassing Bodies	15
6	Embarrassing Bodies	11
7	Embarrassing Bodies	3 specials
8	Embarrassing Bodies	7
9	Embarrassing Bodies	TBA

=== Specials ===
Although specials are considered series in their own right, they tended to be intertwined with the main series.

Name	Series	Episodes
Embarrassing Old Bodies	1	1
Embarrassing Teenage Bodies	2	8
Embarrassing Fat Bodies	2	9

== Awards ==
EB has won two BAFTA awards:

- 2009 Award for Interactivity Online
- 2010 Award for Interactive Creative Contribution

EB was nominated for the 2013 National Television Award for Factual Entertainment.

== Embarrassing Bodies: Live from the Clinic ==
In May 2011, a spin-off series, Embarrassing Bodies: Live from the Clinic (titled Diagnosis Live from the Clinic in pre-publicity and the first episode) launched, enabling viewers to appear via webcams and Skype. The programme was presented by Christian Jessen and Dawn Harper, with additional narration and reports from Pixie McKenna. These episodes consist of approximately 47 minutes.

== International versions ==
=== Embarrassing Bodies Down Under ===
In October 2013, an Australian version of the show was launched on LifeStyle You. The show's first series comprised eight episodes, which were hosted by doctors Ginni Mansberg, Brad McKay, and Sam Hay. The show's layout is similar to its British counterpart and focuses on the health issues of various Australian citizens.

In 2015 the show was broadcast on the Nine Network.

=== Dit is mijn lijf ===
A Dutch spin-off version of the show called Dit is mijn lijf ("This is my body") was broadcast on RTL 4 from 26 October 2011 and ran for three series. In the Netherlands, the British version was aired on RTL 5 under the title of Gênante Lijven ("Embarrassing Bodies").

=== Я соромлюсь свого тіла ===
A Ukrainian spinoff of the show called Я соромлюсь свого тіла ("I'm ashamed of my body") has been broadcast on STB since 6 March 2014.

=== Я стесняюсь своего тела ===
Russian TV channel U, which broadcast the Ukrainian version of the show, made the Russian adaptation in 2019. The Russian name of the show is Я стесняюсь своего тела ("I'm ashamed of my body").

== Reception ==
Channel 4 aired a version of the series where Dawn Harper went to Thailand and provided information on how to stay healthy while abroad. Christopher Hooton of Metro said that it provided some "incredibly sensible tips on staying healthy while travelling".
