= Dawn Harper (doctor) =

British doctor and television presenter

- Born: Dawn Caroline Harper; March 1963 (age 63)
- Occupations: General Practitioner, Television presenter
- Television: Embarrassing Bodies; This Morning; Born Naughty?
- Children: 3
- Website: www.drdawn.com

Dawn Caroline Harper (born March 1963), known professionally as Dr Dawn Harper, is an English doctor, media personality and television presenter known for co-presenting the Channel 4 television series Embarrassing Bodies. She works as a part-time GP in Stroud, Gloucestershire and runs several private clinics.

== Early life and career ==
Harper was born in March 1963. She attended the Royal High School, Bath, where she excelled at languages and science; she then spent a gap year working with the event rider Mary King.

== Career ==
Harper trained as a doctor at Charing Cross and Westminster Medical School.

Harper is a part-time GP in Stroud, Gloucestershire, working for a time under her married name of Isaacs.

=== Television ===
Harper appeared on the Channel 4 series Embarrassing Bodies and Embarrassing Bodies: Live from the Clinic, alongside Pixie McKenna and Christian Jessen. She also appears regularly on This Morning as a medical expert. Harper gives medical advice on Woman's Hour on BBC Radio 4.

Harper has made guest appearances on shows including 10 O'Clock Live, The Gadget Show and The Wright Stuff. She also appeared on Channel 4's Paralympics Breakfast Show and a special Paralympic edition of The Million Pound Drop. In October 2014, Harper took part in a Children in Need episode of The Great British Sewing Bee on BBC Two.

Dawn co-presented Born Naughty?, a four-part series for Channel 4 alongside Ravi Jayaram. The series began on 14 May 2015.

=== Writing ===
Harper has written for several publications, including Mother and Baby magazine and Healthy Food Guide. In 2007, a book titled Dr. Dawn's Health Check was published by Mitchell Beazley.

== Personal life ==
Harper has three children. She was injured in a road accident in 2003 and took two years to recover.
