= All Night =

All Night may refer to:

== Film and broadcasting ==
- All Night (film), a 1918 American silent comedy-drama
- All Night (TV series), a 2018 American teen comedy series
- All Night Nippon or simply All Night, a Japanese late-night radio talk show
- AllNight with Todd Wright, a sports radio talk show, 1996–2005
  - AllNight with Jason Smith, its successor show, 2005–2011

== Songs ==
- "All Night" (Beyoncé song), 2016
- "All Night" (Big Boi song), 2017
- "All Night" (Brothers Osborne song), 2020
- "All Night" (BTS and Juice Wrld song), 2019
- "All Night" (Example song), 2019
- "All Night" (Girls' Generation song), 2017
- "All Night" (Icona Pop song), 2013
- "All Night" (Juicy J and Wiz Khalifa song), 2016
- "All Night" (Lynsey de Paul song), 1973
- "All Night" (R5 song), 2015
- "All Night" (Steve Aoki and Lauren Jauregui song), 2017
- "All Night" (Trinere song), 1985
- "All Night" (The Vamps and Matoma song), 2016
- "All Nite (Don't Stop)", by Janet Jackson, 2003
- "All Night", by Afrojack, 2020
- "All Night", by Annie from Don't Stop, 2009
- "All Night", by Brotherhood of Man from Images, 1977
- "All Night", by Chance the Rapper from Coloring Book, 2016
- "All Night", by Childish Gambino from 3.15.20 (non-album track), 2020
- "All Night", by Crystal Fighters from Everything Is My Family, 2016
- "All Night", by Def Leppard from Euphoria, 1999
- "All Night", by Damien Marley from Welcome to Jamrock, 2005
- "All Night", by f(x) from Red Light, 2014
- "All Night", by (G)I-dle from I Feel, 2023
- "All Night", by Hedley from Cageless, 2017
- "All Night", by Jai Paul from Leak 04-13 (Bait Ones), 2019
- "All Night", by Maroon 5 from Love Is Like, 2025
- "All Night", by Parov Stelar, 2014
- "All Night", by Pearl Jam from Lost Dogs, 2003
- "All Night", by RAF Camora, 2023
- "All Night", by S-X, 2022
- "All Night", by Walk the Moon from What If Nothing, 2017

== See also ==
- All Night Long (disambiguation)
- Open All Night (disambiguation)
- Up All Night (disambiguation)
