= S-X discography =

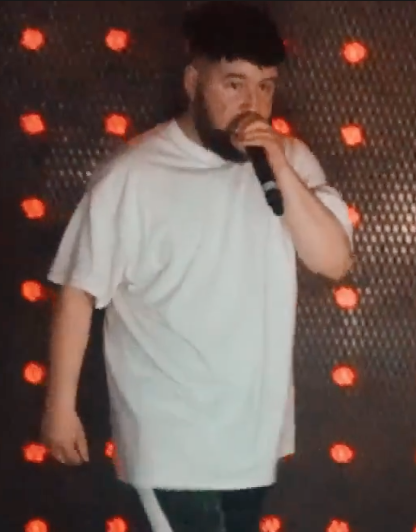
- Gumbley performing in 2018
- Studio albums: 1
- EPs: 2
- Singles: 28
- Music videos: 15
- Mixtapes: 4

English singer S-X has released five studio albums, two extended plays (EPs), 28 singles, and 15 music videos.

== Albums ==
=== Studio albums ===
| Title | Details |
|---|---|
| Things Change | Released: 29 July 2022; Label: RBC, BMG; Format: Digital download, streaming |

== Mixtapes ==
| Title | Details |
|---|---|
| Reasons | Released: 30 March 2018; Label: Self-released; Format: Digital download, streaming |
| Temporary | Released: 24 August 2018; Label: Self-released; Format: Digital download, streaming |
| True Colours | Released: 26 September 2019; Label: Self-released; Format: Digital download, streaming |
| A Repeat Wouldn't Go a Miss | Released: 13 August 2021; Label: RBC, BMG; Format: Digital download, streaming |

== Extended plays ==
| Title | Details |
|---|---|
| Council Pop | Released: 3 June 2016; Label: Self-released; Format: Digital download, streaming |
| House Clothes | Released: 29 September 2017; Label: Self-released; Format: Digital download, streaming |

== Singles ==
=== As lead artist ===
List of singles as a lead artist, with selected chart positions, showing year released and album name
| Title | Year | | Peak chart positions | | | | | | Album |
| Title | Year | UK | UK Down. | UKStream. | UK Indie | IRE | NZHot | SCO | Album |
|---|---|---|---|---|---|---|---|---|---|
| "Woooo" | 2010 | — | — | — | — | — | — | — | Non-album single |
| "Voodoo" (featuring Gia Woods) | 2015 | — | — | — | — | — | — | — | Non-album single |
| "No Shoes" | 2016 | — | — | — | — | — | — | — | Non-album single |
| "Show Me Love" | 2016 | — | — | — | — | — | — | — | Non-album single |
| "Wrong For You" | 2017 | — | — | — | — | — | — | — | Non-album single |
| "Tell You" | 2017 | — | — | — | — | — | — | — | Non-album single |
| "I Need You" | 2017 | — | — | — | — | — | — | — | Non-album single |
| "Plans" | 2017 | — | — | — | — | — | — | — | Non-album single |
| "Still I Get" | 2017 | — | — | — | — | — | — | — | Non-album single |
| "Everytime" | 2018 | — | — | — | — | — | — | — | Reasons |
| "Think It's Me" | 2018 | — | — | — | — | — | — | — | Reasons |
| "Waste Time" | 2018 | — | — | — | — | — | — | — | Reasons |
| "Rain Now" | 2018 | — | — | — | — | — | — | — | Non-album single |
| "Had Me, Lost Me" | 2019 | — | — | — | — | — | — | — | Non-album single |
| "Pullin Up" | 2019 | — | — | — | — | — | — | — | Non-album single |
| "Always Wrong" | 2019 | — | — | — | — | — | — | — | True Colours |
| "Too Soon" | 2019 | — | — | — | — | — | — | — | True Colours |
| "Neither Would I" | 2020 | — | 45 | — | 42 | — | — | 53 | A Repeat Wouldn't Go a Miss |
| "Dangerous" | 2020 | — | 31 | — | 20 | — | — | 31 | A Repeat Wouldn't Go a Miss |
| "In Real Life" | 2020 | — | — | — | — | — | — | — | A Repeat Wouldn't Go a Miss |
| "Distance" (with Mischa Mi) | 2021 | — | — | — | — | — | — | — | Non-album single |
| "Feels So Good" | 2021 | — | — | — | — | — | — | — | A Repeat Wouldn't Go a Miss |
| "Too Late in the Night" | 2021 | — | — | — | — | — | — | — | A Repeat Wouldn't Go a Miss |
| "Who We Are" | 2021 | — | — | — | — | — | — | — | Things Change |
| "All Night" (featuring Trippie Redd) | 2022 | — | — | — | — | — | — | — | Things Change |
| "Locked Out" (featuring KSI) | 2022 | 53 | — | 93 | 5 | 62 | 14 | — | Things Change |
| "It's Over Now" | 2022 | — | — | — | — | — | — | — | Things Change |
| "The Come Up" (with Yxng Dave and Bryn) | 2022 | — | — | — | — | — | — | — | Non-album single |
| "For So Long" | 2023 | — | — | — | — | — | — | — | Anywhere But Here |
| "Tried and Tried" | 2023 | — | — | — | — | — | — | — | Anywhere But Here |
| "Time Heals" | 2023 | — | — | — | — | — | — | — | Anywhere But Here |
| "Close to Me" | 2023 | — | — | — | — | — | — | — | Anywhere But Here |
| "Feels" | 2023 | — | — | — | — | — | — | — | Anywhere But Here |
| "Wasting Time" | 2023 | — | — | — | — | — | — | — | Anywhere But Here |
| "Fading Away" | 2023 | — | — | — | — | — | — | — | Anywhere But Here |
| "The Hard Way" | 2023 | — | — | — | — | — | — | — | Anywhere But Here |
| "Answers" (featuring Blade Brown) | 2023 | — | — | — | — | — | — | — | Anywhere But Here |
| "Divided" (featuring Big K.R.I.T.) | 2023 | — | — | — | — | — | — | — | Anywhere But Here |
| "I'd Go (The Long Way)" | 2024 | — | — | — | — | — | — | — | TBA |
| "Draw The Line" | 2024 | — | — | — | — | — | — | — | TBA |
| "Demons" | 2024 | — | — | — | — | — | — | — | TBA |
"—" denotes a recording that did not chart or was not released in that territory.

=== As featured artist ===
List of singles as a featured artist, with selected chart positions, showing year released and album name
| Title | Year | Peak chart positions | | | | | | | | | | Certifications | Album |
| Title | Year | UK | UK HH/R&B | CAN | EST | GRE | IRE | LAT | LIT | NZ Hot | SCO | Certifications | Album |
|---|---|---|---|---|---|---|---|---|---|---|---|---|---|
| "Down Like That" (KSI featuring Rick Ross, Lil Baby and S-X) | 2019 | 10 | 3 | 77 | 37 | 76 | 26 | 41 | 87 | 10 | 9 | BPI: Gold | Dissimulation |
| "The Gift" (The Sidemen featuring S-X) | 2019 | 77 | 40 | — | — | — | — | — | — | 27 | 26 | | Non-album single |
| "So Far Away" (KSI featuring S-X) | 2025 | — | — | — | — | — | — | — | — | — | — | | TBA |
"—" denotes a recording that did not chart or was not released in that territory.

== Guest appearances ==
List of non-single guest appearances, with other performing artists, showing year released and album name
| Title | Year | Other artist(s) | Album |
|---|---|---|---|
| "Anymore" | 2017 | Jaykae | Where Have You Been? |
| "Night to Remember" | 2020 | KSI, Randolph | Dissimulation (Deluxe Edition) |
| "Sleeping with the Enemy" | 2021 | KSI | All Over the Place |
| "Know You" | 2021 | KSI, A1 x J1 | All Over the Place (Deluxe Edition) |

== Music videos ==
List of music videos as lead and featured artist, showing directors
| Title | Year | Director(s) | Ref. |
As lead artist
| "Shoes" | 2017 | VORN & S-X | |
| "Like Me (Remix)" | 2017 | VORN & S-X | |
| "Still I Get" | 2018 | VORN | |
| "Everytime" | 2018 | VORN | |
| "Think It's Me" | 2018 | Phelan McCormack | |
| "Waste Time" | 2018 | VORN | |
| "Turn Me Down" | 2018 | VORN | |
| "You Was Right" | 2018 | Brian Millbrook & S-X | |
| "Too Soon" | 2019 | Danyl Goodall, Troy Roscoe & VORN | |
| "Come Alive" | 2019 | Danyl Goodall & Troy Roscoe | |
| "neither would i" | 2020 | Unknown | |
| "Dangerous" | 2020 | Danyl Goodall, Troy Roscoe & S-X | |
| "In Real Life" | 2020 | Danyl Goodall, Troy Roscoe & S-X | |
| "Distance" (with Mischa Mi) | 2021 | Danyl Goodall & Troy Roscoe | |
| "Feels So Good" | 2021 | Troy Roscoe | |
| "Who We Are" | 2021 | Troy Roscoe | |
| "Locked Out" (featuring KSI) | 2022 | Troy Roscoe | |
As featured artist
| "Down Like That" (KSI featuring Rick Ross, Lil Baby and S-X) | 2019 | Nayip Ramos | |
| "The Gift" (Sidemen featuring S-X) | 2019 | Konstantin | |
