= Whitney (TV series) =

American sitcom

- Whitney season 2 intertitle
- Genre: Sitcom
- Created by: Whitney Cummings
- Starring: Whitney Cummings; Chris D'Elia; Rhea Seehorn; Zoe Lister-Jones; Dan O'Brien; Maulik Pancholy; Tone Bell
- Music by: Ed Alton
- Country of origin: United States
- Original language: English
- No. of seasons: 2
- No. of episodes: 38 (list of episodes)

Production
- Executive producers: Andy Ackerman; Barry Katz; Betsy Thomas; Quan Phung; Scott Stuber; Whitney Cummings
- Producer: Nancy Haas
- Editor: Richard Candib
- Camera setup: Multi-camera
- Running time: 22 minutes
- Production companies: Stuber Television; Bluegrass Television; Universal Television

Original release
- Network: NBC
- Release: September 22, 2011 – March 27, 2013

Whitney is an American television sitcom that ran on NBC from September 22, 2011, to March 27, 2013. The series originally aired in the 9:30 pm (E/P)/8:30 pm (C) Thursday night timeslot. The show stars Whitney Cummings and is based on her real-life experience and her comedy routines. On September 25, 2011, the pilot of Whitney was multi-purposed on various Universal Television networks, including Oxygen, E!, Style, and Bravo.

On May 9, 2013, Whitney was canceled by NBC after two seasons.

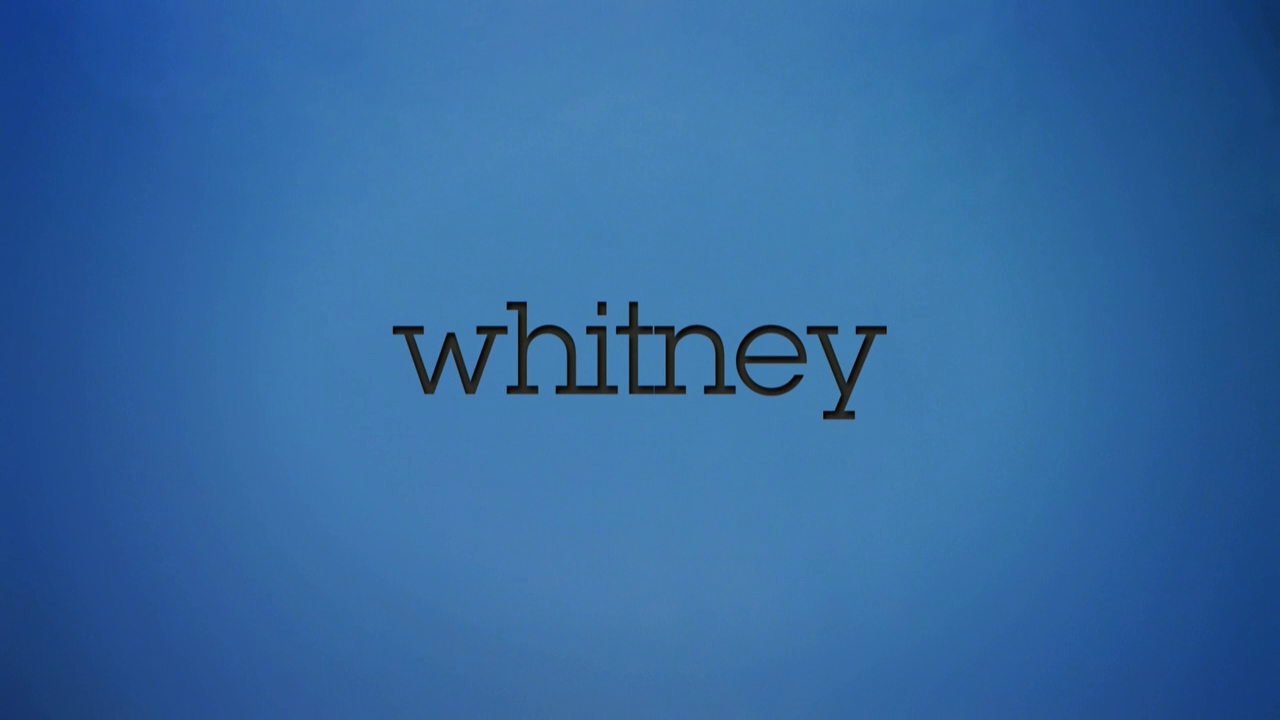
Whitney season 1 intertitle

== Synopsis ==
The series follows Whitney Cummings, as she portrays a fictionalized version of herself, and her very supportive live-in boyfriend, Alex. Even though the two have decided that they will not commit to marriage, she does question how committed they are in their 3-year relationship and tries to go as far to prove a point. She begins to fear what she sees as "relationship boredom" and worries what will happen next that could possibly end their relationship. Because of what she sees and hears around her involving other relationships, she uses unconventional methods to keep the romantic flames glowing with Alex, often seeking the help of her close friends. The sitcom is set in Chicago.

== Cast and characters ==
=== Main ===
- Whitney Cummings as herself, a photographer
- Chris D'Elia as Alex Miller, developer of the "Mendeavors" website that helps men gain life skills and accomplish various tasks
- Rhea Seehorn as Roxanne Harris, an over-the-top divorcee and Whitney's friend who later becomes her boss
- Zoe Lister-Jones as Lily Dixon, a close friend of Whitney's and ex-fiancée of Neal
- Dan O'Brien as Mark Murphy, Alex's best friend and a former Chicago police officer who now owns Low Bar
- Maulik Pancholy as Neal (season 1), Lily's ex-fiancée and a friend of Alex. After Alex and Whitney see him on a date with a man, he comes out as bisexual.
- Tone Bell as R.J. (season 2), short for Reginald José, Alex's long-time friend from high school, and a bartender at Low Bar, the gang's new hangout

=== Recurring ===
- Jane Kaczmarek as Candi, Whitney's mother
- Peter Gallagher as Vince, Whitney's father
- Hayes MacArthur as Lance, Roxanne's ex-husband
- Chelsea Handler as Dr. Price, Whitney's therapist
- John Cleese as Dr. Grant, Whitney and Alex's couples therapist
- Dean Norris as Wayne Miller, Alex's father

== Episodes ==
Season	Episodes	Originally released		Viewers (millions)	Rank
Season	Episodes	First released	Last released	Viewers (millions)	Rank
1	22	September 22, 2011	March 28, 2012	5.11	#122
2	16	November 14, 2012	March 27, 2013	4.19	#115

== Development and production ==
Whitney was one of two network television shows created by Whitney Cummings to premiere during the 2011-12 United States television season. The other, which she shares creator credit with Michael Patrick King and does not star in, is the CBS series 2 Broke Girls which is produced by Warner Bros. Television.

For Whitney, Cummings serves as the executive producer, creator and writer with Scott Stuber, Quan Phung, and Betsy Thomas for Universal Television. Beverly D'Angelo originally played Patti, Whitney's mother, in the pilot episode before being replaced by Jane Kaczmarek, with parts of the pilot being reshot as a consequence. The tabloid, New York Post reported that Cummings received $60,000 per episode for the first three episodes, and was to receive a salary increase after the show ordered for a full season because of good ratings.

NBC moved the series to Wednesday beginning January 11, 2012. On May 11, 2012, NBC renewed the series for a second season, which was to premiere on October 19, 2012. On October 8, 2012, the premiere date for Whitney was delayed by NBC to give it proper marketing. On October 18, 2012, NBC announced it would air the season 2 premiere of Whitney on November 14, 2012.

After the poor critical reception of the show upon its debut that was largely directed at Cummings herself, the producers of Whitney changed the direction of the series to a more ensemble-like show in the style of Friends to reduce the pressure on Cummings, who was also experiencing personal troubles. At the time, her mother had suffered a stroke, and her sister was entering rehab. Wil Calhoun replaced Betsy Thomas as showrunner for the second season. Additionally, Maulik Pancholy did not return to the show for the new season as the show focused more on the relationship between the two leads and less on the ensemble cast as seen in the later part of the previous season. It was also announced that NBC Stand Up For Diversity winner Tone Bell would join the cast as a character named "RJ".

On November 9, 2012, NBC ordered five additional scripts for the television series, but only picked up three, increasing its season order to sixteen.

== International broadcasts ==
The series had been picked up in Canada by CTV, where it premiered on September 19, 2011, after the season premiere of Two and a Half Men. It continued air on the same night as the NBC telecasts, but was also scheduled in different timeslots by region. Whitney ended up becoming the No.1 new comedy of the season during 2011–12 in Canada on CTV. The second season began airing on October 20, 2012. In the United Kingdom, India, and Ireland, Whitney had been picked up by Comedy Central, and began airing on July 3, 2012.

The series premiered in Australia on the Seven Network on October 11, 2012.

== Reception ==
=== Critical reception ===
Whitney originally premiered to mixed reviews from critics, with Cummings herself receiving criticism in online articles and reviews for the series. The first season holds a Metacritic score of 49/100. The New Yorker's Emily Nussbaum suggested that Cummings was 2011's "sexy-girl hate magnet", experiencing a disproportionate amount of attention for being successful as well as attractive. An example of this saw Andrew Goldman of The New York Times asking Cummings in an interview if she had slept her way to success. Much criticism was also aimed at what was perceived as an overly aggressive ad campaign for the show by the network. The critics also found issue with the content of the ads, which were described as "regressive" and "old-fashioned". Upon its debut, the pilot episode received mixed reviews, holding a score of 49 out of 100 on the review aggregator Metacritic. Alessandra Stanley of The New York Times found that the episode was the funnier of the two shows by Cummings debuting that season because the humor was more original. Robert Lloyd of the Los Angeles Times found that despite some missteps, the series was promising, writing that "[e]ventually the mood relaxes, even as the slapstick amps up, and what may prove to be a charming comedy begins to emerge." Other reviews found the series to be a retread of past sitcoms, with dated jokes. The Huffington Post called the series uninspired, and found many of the characters to be tenuous at best. The premiere was given a D− by The A.V. Club reviewers Erik Adams and Steve Heisler, who highlighted the weakness of Cummings' acting.

As the series progressed, some reviewers remarked about improvements in the show. Willa Paskin of Salon found that the series improved structurally from the eighth episode, while the chemistry of the two leads was brought to the forefront. However, she still found that the jokes were not good enough. Jaime Weinman of Maclean's agreed with Paskin, additionally noting that the series depicted a more realistic relationship compared with other freshmen sitcoms such as New Girl. Stephan Lee, writing for Entertainment Weekly, compared Whitney favorably to Cummings' other series, 2 Broke Girls, citing what he perceived to be an increasingly stronger and more multidimensional supporting cast in the former. Jesse David Fox of Splitsider found that the series began to find its footing as it progressed from its pilot and misleading initial ad campaign.

=== Ratings ===
The series debuted on Canada's CTV on September 19, 2011, three days before its American premiere on NBC. The show won its timeslot with two million viewers, buoyed by its lead-in, the much-anticipated ninth-season premiere of Two and a Half Men.

The series made a modest debut in the US, scoring with 6.8 million viewers and a 4.0/6 rating. However, it premiered more importantly to a strong 3.2 18–49 demo rating (on which the cost of advertisement is often dependent). By December it had dropped to 4 million viewers and a 1.9 rating, being described by Entertainment Weekly as in "a ratings murk".

The show moved to Wednesdays at 8 pm midway through its first season, getting 4.5 million viewers and a 1.7 18–49 demo rating on its first airing.

Ratings history for Whitney
Season	Timeslot (ET)	Episodes	Premiered		Ended		TV Season	Rank	Viewers (in millions)
Season	Timeslot (ET)	Episodes	Date	Premiere Viewers (in millions)	Date	Finale Viewers (in millions)	TV Season	Rank	Viewers (in millions)
1	Thursday 9:30 pm (2011); Wednesday 8:00 pm (2012)	22	September 22, 2011	6.84	March 28, 2012	4.09	2011–2012	#109	5.11
2	Wednesday 8:00 pm	16	November 14, 2012	4.22	March 27, 2013	2.88	2012–2013	#107	4.19
