= The Angry Beavers =

American animated television series

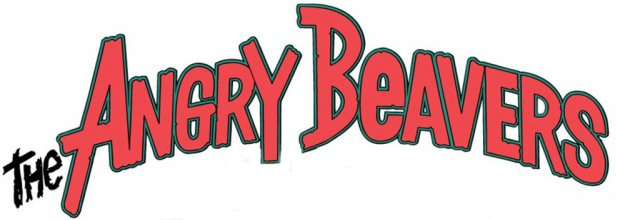
- Genre: Animated sitcom; Surreal humour; Slapstick
- Created by: Mitch Schauer
- Developed by: Mitch Schauer; Keith Kaczorek
- Directed by: Michael Gerard
- Voices of: Nick Bakay; Richard Steven Horvitz; Victor Wilson; Cynthia Mann
- Theme music composer: Charlie Brissette
- Composer: Charlie Brissette
- Country of origin: United States
- Original language: English
- No. of seasons: 4
- No. of episodes: 62 (123 segments) (list of episodes)

Production
- Executive producers: Gunther-Wahl Productions: Lee Gunther; Michael Wahl; Mitch Schauer; Nickelodeon: Mary Harrington
- Running time: 23 minutes
- Production company: Gunther-Wahl Productions

Original release
- Network: Nickelodeon
- Release: April 19, 1997 – November 11, 2003
- Network: Nicktoons
- Release: June 11 – August 27, 2006

The Angry Beavers is an American animated sitcom created by Mitch Schauer for Nickelodeon. The series revolves around the zany hijinks of Norbert and Daggett Beaver, two young anthropomorphic North American beaver brothers who have moved out of their parents' home to become bachelors in the forest near the fictional Wayouttatown, Oregon. The series premiered in the United States on April 19, 1997, and ended its initial run on November 11, 2003.

Five additional episodes would not premiere in the United States on Nickelodeon during its initial run and would premiere in that country on Nicktoons in 2006, with the last episode airing on August 27. The complete series has also been released on DVD in Region 1 by Shout! Factory.

During its initial run, The Angry Beavers was nominated for five Annie Awards and three Daytime Emmy Awards, and the show had won one of both awards.

== Characters ==
=== The Angry Beavers ===
The series' stars, Daggett (left) and Norbert (right)

- Norbert Foster "Norb" Beaver (voiced by Mitchell Whitfield in the pilot and Nick Bakay in the series) is a light-yellow beaver, who is Daggett's older brother by four minutes. Articulate and well-read, Norbert is a highly opinionated beaver who acts as the voice of reason and straight man to his younger brother's insane ideas. Despite this, he is very lazy and patronizing towards Daggett. Norbert can be extremely and unjustifiably selfish at times, and tends to bully, insult, and take advantage of his brother, which usually backfires in some way but does not lead to any permanent consequences for him like it does for Daggett. Despite their friction and, Norbert deeply loves his brother and will often collaborate with him or go to great lengths to help and protect him.
- Daggett Doofus "Dag" Beaver (voiced by Richard Steven Horvitz) is a brown beaver, and the younger brother of Norbert by four minutes. Energetic and childish, Daggett has a habit of over-the-top and sensitive emotions, as well as a self-defence mechanism of name-calling. Those things could very well have to do with how he is constantly treated badly. He seems to have a love-hate relationship with Norbert, helping and antagonizing him as his mood requires. He may or may not be aware that Norbert is abusing him. He has a telephone in the likeness of Bullwinkle J. Moose from Rocky and Bullwinkle. While usually seeming to be unintelligent, Daggett's intelligence can vary widely to meet an episode's needs from being somewhat dim-witted to instinctual insightful or even accomplishing impressive scientific feats. Daggett was described by the creator as having ADHD. Despite their friction, Norbert deeply loves his brother and will often collaborate with him or go to great lengths to help and protect him.

=== Supporting and recurring ===
- Stump is a giant sequoia stump who is a close friend of Norbert and Daggett. He frequents many of the beavers' social events, forming an integral part of their inner friendship circle. He is apparently alive, but does not talk.
- Treeflower (voiced by Cynthia Mann) is a dark orange hippie beaver with many jobs outside the forest, who is also Norbert's girlfriend. According to Mitch Schauer, Treeflower and Norbert went on to be married and had two daughters, Lily and Petunia after the events of the series.
- Bing (voiced by Victor Wilson) is an annoying talkative lizard who hangs out with Norbert and Daggett. Bing is able to camouflage himself to blend with his surroundings like a chameleon but is able to lose and generate his tail like a skink or a gecko.
- Barry Bear (voiced by John Garry) is Norbert and Daggett's disco/funk-loving grizzly bear best friend, whose voice and personality is modeled on Barry White. Barry is a vegetarian despite being a bear.
- Truckee (voiced by Mark Klastorin in most appearances and Mitch Schauer in "Dag's List") is a truck-loving shrew, who Daggett hates immensely. He drives a big truck around called "Big Renee".
- Big Rabbit (voiced by Scott Weil in most appearances and Richard Steven Horvitz in "Omega Beaver") is Norbert and Daggett's toughest friend. He sent a threatening note to them and set up a bodyguard business so they would be his friend.
- Wolffe D. Wolf (voiced by Wally Wingert) is an easygoing gray wolf who is a close friend of Norbert and Daggett and is the opposite of the typical wolfish stereotype.
- Chelsea Beaver (voiced by Chelsea Schauer) is one of Norbert and Daggett's younger sisters and a female doppelgänger of Daggett. Chelsea is also manic and naive like Daggett.
- Stacy Beaver (voiced by Stacy Schauer) is another of Norbert and Daggett's younger sisters and a female doppelgänger of Norbert. Stacy is also level-headed and sardonic like Norbert.
- Leonard Beaver (voiced by Tim Thomerson in most appearances and Lorin Dreyfuss in "If You In-Sisters") is the lazy and scruffy father of Norbert, Daggett, Chelsea, and Stacy. In the Season Three episode "A Little Dad'll Do You", he once stayed with Norbert and Daggett because their mother and sisters left to visit their grandmother. Leonard has a strange condition called the "poo spot" (when someone presses it, it makes a flatulence noise). In the Season Three episode "Slap Happy", he also encourages Dag to slap his tail even though beavers are only supposed to use the slap for emergencies.
- Rose Beaver (voiced by Sheryl Bernstein in her cameo appearance "Up All Night", Linda Phillips in "Kandid Kreatures", Marcia Wallace in "If You In-Sisters" and Ruth Buzzi in "The Mom from U.N.C.L.E.") is Norbert, Dagget, Chelsea, and Stacy's mother and Leonard's wife. She is a secret agent as well as a housewife.
- High Princess (voiced by Beverly Garland) is the leader of the female raccoon tribe and the beavers' nemesis who appears twice in the series. During her first appearance, she mistakes Daggett for a god because he had a knot hole on his head. However, Norbert and Daggett end up destroying the knot hole. She gets even with the beavers by having her tribe cook their dam over an open flame. During her second appearance, it was revealed that she was the one pranking Norb and Dag.
- Bill Licking (voiced by Gregg Berger) is a wig-wearing wildlife television host and Norbert and Daggett's influence and sometimes rival. In the episode "Kandid Kreatures", he had a contract with the beavers to make them look good but instead he humiliated them.
- Laverta Lutz (voiced by Kate Donahue) is a big, careless Southern-accented magical woman who works in the bowing alley as a maintenance worker who always bumps into Daggett for making wishes for him.
- El Grapadura (voiced by Timothy Borquez in most appearances, Luke Torres in "Kandid Kreatures" and Joe Lala in some episodes) is the Mexican Luchador, Norbert and Daggett's favorite wrestling hero. His name translates in English as The Stapler.
- Oxnard Montalvo (voiced by Tom Kane) is Norbert and Daggett's favorite B movie actor. Norbert and Daggett once helped him save the world from the monsters in his movies because they brought them to life by remembering his films.
- Toluca Lake (voiced by Adrienne Barbeau, Sheryl Bernstein as "Actress Sarah" in lUp All Night") is an actress who plays the damsel in distress in Oxnard's B-movies.
- Dr. Cowtiki (voiced by William Schallert) is the other actor who played the scientist in the B-movies with Oxnard and Toluca.
- Scientist #1 (voiced by Edward Winter) is a mad scientist who laughs in an evil way as he does his job for science and is the main antagonist of the series and archenemy of Norbert and Daggett. Scientist #1 always mistakes the beavers for pointy weasels.

== Production ==
=== Conception and development ===
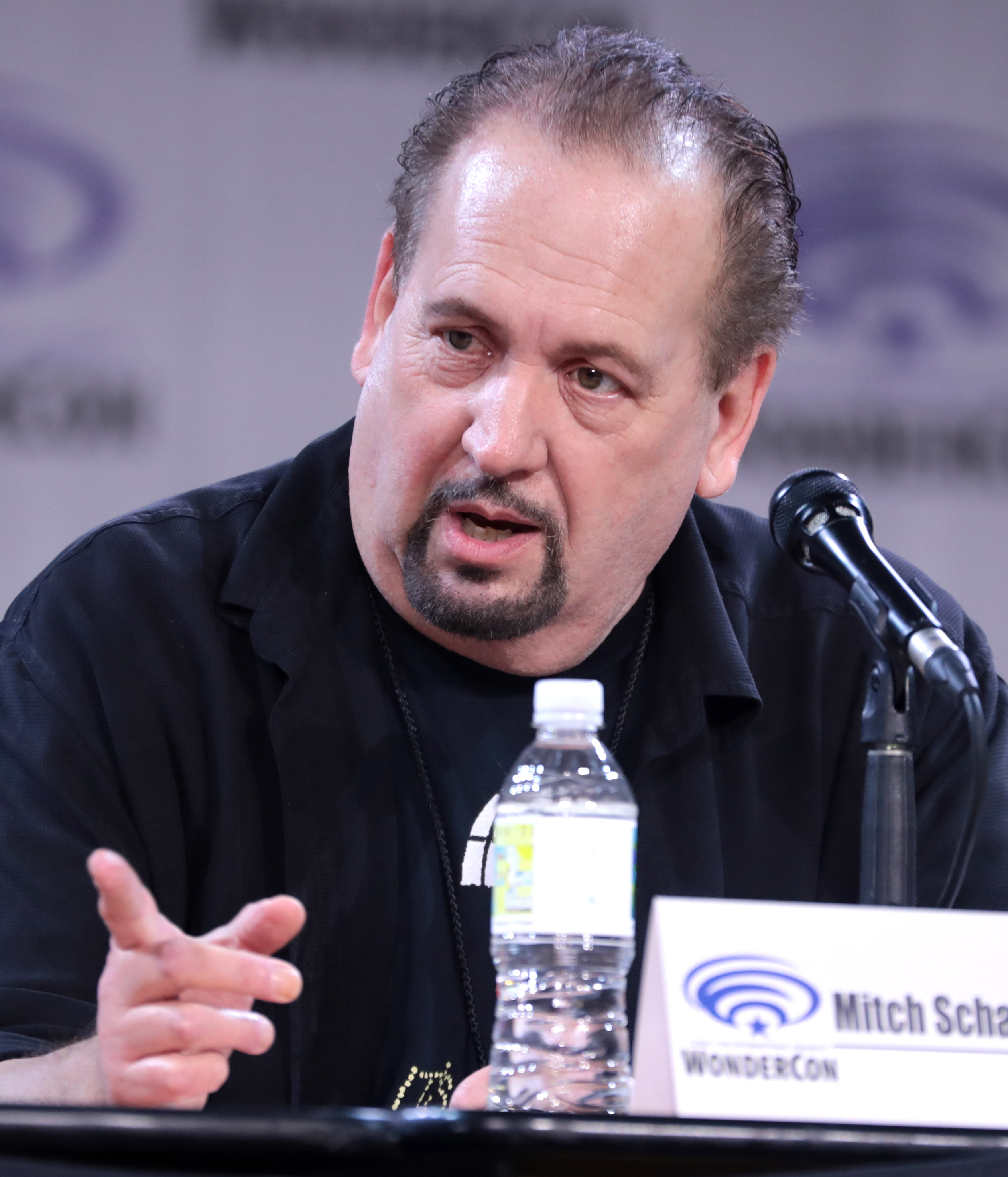
The Angry Beavers creator and executive producer Mitch Schauer (pictured; 2023)

The Angry Beavers was the brainchild of Mitch Schauer, and was co-developed by Keith Kaczorek. Prior to the series, Schauer was originally an assistant storyboard artist for other Nickelodeon shows, such as The Ren & Stimpy Show, Rocko's Modern Life, and Hey Arnold!. Schauer also storyboarded 8 episodes of the 1992 Addams Family television series. During his time as producer of the Warner Bros. animated series Freakazoid! in 1995, Gunther-Wahl Productions Inc. (Schauer's employer at the time) requested three ideas for animated series, as the studio had the opportunity to pitch a show to Nickelodeon. One of the three ideas that Schauer presented was an early concept for The Angry Beavers. Schauer wasn't even present for the pitch meeting, his ideas being pitched for him by the production company instead. Of the three ideas, network producer Mary Harrington was intrigued by the Beavers. The initial concept of the show centered on two bad-tempered, politically incorrect beavers that hated anything that was a fad, cause, or just popular in the media. "I tend to develop things that are counterculture," stated Schauer. "I like to buck whatever is popular at the time or considered society's way of doing things, because you get more interest when you stand outside the box." Schauer was against making the beavers cute, as a response to many of the "soft, safe" character designs at the time. He also cited cartoons such as The Pink Panther, The Flintstones, and Rocky and Bullwinkle as primary influences for the show.

As production progressed, Schauer and the crew adopted real-world beaver traits into the show, with Schauer considering himself a "beaver expert" by the end. Traits adapted into the show include their endlessly growing incisors, tail slapping, and scent glands. During his time at Nickelodeon, Schauer gifted Harrington a personally signed log that was bitten by a beaver, though he later admitted in 2017 that he bit it himself.

Richard Steven Horvitz and Nick Bakay were chosen as voice actors for main beavers Daggett and Norbert, respectively. Gunther-Wahl held auditions for over 300 different actors, but Schauer settled on the two because they embodied the two beavers' characters perfectly, also being impressed by their chemistry upon being introduced to one another. He recalled the two frequently going off-script while recording, which he encouraged, considering their improvisation leading to some of the series' best moments. Schauer was influenced by classic Hollywood director Howard Hawks for the show's ad-libbing and overlapping of dialogue; a type of technique that would be used in similar animated shows such as SpongeBob SquarePants, The Fairly OddParents, Phineas and Ferb, and Family Guy.

=== Challenges, censorship, and "Bye Bye Beavers" ===
There was often tension between the show's staff and Nickelodeon, with the channel imposing seemingly arbitrary restrictions on the show's content. An example includes Season One's "Go Beavers," where they rejected a scene that would have featured a blimp crashing into an audience of people, while a scene in the same segment featuring out-of-control Zambonis that wipe into and supposedly kill a crowd of people didn't meet any objections, nor did the instances of Norbert savagely beating Daggett with a stick and ignoring his many injuries. Most infamously, the phrase "shut up" was initially censored in the 1998 segment "Alley Oops." Writer Micah Wright attributed this to then-Nickelodeon president Herb Scannell, quoting him as saying: "I don't like it when children say 'shut up,' so if we never say it on our show, children will never say it in the real world." Wright further claimed that Scannell "would make these sweeping pronouncements about the way the world worked, and the way that kids thought, and what he wanted the world to look like." Scannell even imposed a "no drag policy," which forbade characters dressing in opposite-gender clothing in order to prevent "sexual confusion" amongst the show's younger viewers. Nick Bakay, voice of Norbert, also expressed displeasure with the network, dubbing them "not very artist-friendly."

While the show was popular and was renewed for four seasons, staff continued to push against the network's Standards and Practices division. "We were significantly over budget, behind schedule, and had generally worn out our welcome [with the network]," recalled series co-developer Keith Kaczorek. As the series faced cancellation, the crew devised a finale segment, "Bye Bye Beavers," where the Beavers are informed by mail that their show is cancelled. During the segment, they openly criticize the network for cancelling shows and syndication, wrestle with their existence as cartoon characters, and even reference the censoring of the phrase "shut up." The segment was expected to be fully produced, as Nickelodeon initially approved the premise of the segment, but as production went on they reversed their decision. Production was halted as the segment went against the network's policies of forbidding any reference to a show ending or characters dying. As a result, the segment only exists in the form of leaked storyboards and audio (the latter being released by Richard Steven Horvitz, voice of Daggett, in 2006). Margie Cohn, then-Executive Vice President of the network's original programming, admitted that the segment's script was "beautifully crafted, funny, and clever," but ultimately the network was against the idea of killing off characters that its audience had grown to love.

Schauer would sometimes poke fun at the network's demands. The segment "The Legend of Kid Friendly" (where the Beavers face off against a cyborg cowboy literally named "Kid Friendly") was created as a response to broadcast standards notes received from the network. "One of the most repeated notes was 'make sure it's kid-friendly,' so it seemed natural to write a story around the comment," said Schauer. Weapons featured in the show typically received feedback requesting them be redesigned to be "larger and more colorful," to which the crew would easily oblige. Despite the crew typically being at odds with network censorship, Schauer considers the general experience of working with Nickelodeon a positive one.

The Angry Beavers was the final (and most notable) animated series produced by Gunther-Wahl Productions Inc., with production of the series ending in 2001, the company shut down that same year, with the series also ending altogether two years later (not counting the unaired episodes that aired mostly in Canada, which would eventually air on Nicktoons Network in August 2006).

== Episodes ==
Season	Segments	Episodes		Originally released	
Season	Segments	Episodes		First released	Last released
Pilot				—N/a	
1	26	13		April 19, 1997	September 28, 1997
2	25	13		March 1, 1998	November 21, 1998
3	44	22		March 14, 1999	March 18, 2000
4	18	14 (Note: Every season four episode (barring "Specs Appeal" / "Things That Go Hook in the Night") aired early on YTV.)	9	October 14, 2000 (YTV) January 6, 2001 (Nickelodeon)	March 10, 2001 (YTV) November 11, 2003 (Nickelodeon)
4	10	14	5	June 11, 2006 (Nicktoons)	August 27, 2006 (Nicktoons)

== Reception ==
The show received generally positive reviews from critics. Harlene Ellin of the Chicago Tribune praised the show for its humor, visuals, cultural references, and nonsensical plots, writing "Although the story lines can be pure silliness, the characters are well-developed and likable, whether they're fighting each other or working together. But most of all, [this show is] downright funny. And dam it, 'The Angry Beavers' is definitely that." Hollywood.com considered the show to be "truly the most clever and mature cartoon to air on Nickelodeon", praising its "whip-smart" dialogue and cultural references, considering it underappreciated when compared to Nickelodeon's other classic cartoons. Spencer Coriarty of Screen Rant wrote, "Together the two seem to get involved in every odd occurrence conceivable [...] the animation here is rather stunning, as is the offbeat writing which includes throwbacks to 1950s sci-fi. Creative as it is sporadic, The Angry Beavers is chaotic, nutty, whacky, and fun in the best possible way." Olivia Armstrong of Decider praised the show for appealing to older audiences, saying "Not only did you love to watch the adventures of Norbert and Daggett Beaver, but so did your parents and older siblings, without pestering you to hand over the remote. Perhaps it was the pure slapstick comedy or their bizarre, sometimes inappropriate friends and neighbors, but those beavers will go down in history as the funniest dam dwellers to ever exist and the oddest way to bring your family together." Andrea Graham of Common Sense Media spoke positively of the series, writing "While the series' humor may seem sophomoric, it's actually quite funny."

=== Awards and nominations ===
Award	Category	Nominee	Result
World Animation Celebration	Best Animation Produced for Daytime	Mitch Schauer	Won
World Animation Celebration	Best Director for Daytime Series	Robert Hughes	Won
Motion Picture Sound Editors, USA	Best Sound Editing — Television Animated Series	Unknown	Nominated
Motion Picture Sound Editors, USA	Best Sound Editing — Television Animated Series	Tim Borquez, Thom Syslo	Nominated
Daytime Emmy Award	Outstanding Sound Mixing — Special Class	Timothy Borquez and Timothy J. Garrity	Nominated
Daytime Emmy Award	Outstanding Sound Editing - Special Class	Thomas Syslo, Timothy Borquez, Eric Freeman, Rick Hammel, Les Wolf and Marc Mailand	Won
Daytime Emmy Award	Outstanding Sound Mixing — Special Class	Krandal Crews, Eric Freeman, Timothy Borquez and Timothy J. Garrity	Nominated
Annie Awards	Outstanding Achievement in a Daytime Animated Television Program	Mitch Schauer	Nominated
Annie Awards	Outstanding Individual Achievement for Effects Animation	Joel Krasnove	Nominated
Annie Awards	Outstanding Individual Achievement for Production Design in an Animated Television Production	Dan Chessher	Nominated
Annie Awards	Best Individual Achievement: Production Design in a TV Production	Mitch Schauer	Won
Annie Awards	Best Promotional Production (for main title)	Unknown	Nominated

== Home media ==
Nickelodeon and Amazon.com teamed up to release The Angry Beavers and other Nick shows on manufacture-on-demand DVD-R discs available exclusively through Amazon's CreateSpace arm.

CreateSpace Releases	Release Date	Discs	Episodes
Best of Angry Beavers Season 1	June 28, 2010	3	11
Best of Angry Beavers Season 2	December 8, 2010	3	19
Best of Angry Beavers Season 3	December 8, 2010	3	19

The Angry Beavers sets, among others, were discontinued when Shout! Factory started releasing traditional DVDs of many Nickelodeon series. The first DVD release for Angry Beavers was the Seasons 1 and 2 4-disc set on August 23, 2011. Season 3: Part 1 was released in a 2-disc set on February 28, 2012. Season 3: Part 2 was released in a 2-disc set on August 14, 2012. Season 4 (The Final Season) was released in a 2-disc set on February 4, 2014.

On July 30, 2013, Shout! Factory released the complete series set in Region 1.

Shout! Factory Releases	Release Date	Discs	Episodes
Season 1 & 2	August 23, 2011	4	26
Season 3: Part 1 Season 3: Part 2	February 28, 2012; August 14, 2012	2; 2	11; 11
Season 4	February 4, 2014	2	14
The Complete Series	July 30, 2013	10	62

In Australia, The Angry Beavers has been released on DVD by Beyond Home Entertainment.

	Release date	Discs	Episodes
Season 1	April 3, 2013	2	13
Season 2	April 3, 2013	2	13
Season 3	June 5, 2013	4	22
Season 4	December 4, 2013	2	14
The Essential Episodes: Seasons 1-4	October 1, 2014	10	62
The Angry Beavers: Collector's Edition	September 1, 2016	10	62
The Angry Beavers: Collector's Set (Bonus T-shirt)	December 6, 2017	8	48
The Angry Beavers: The Collector's Set	July 4, 2018	10	62

== Video games ==
Though the series has no official video games, Norbert and Daggett appear in Nicktoons Racing and Nickelodeon All-Star Brawl 2 as playable characters. The two also make cameo appearances in Nicktoons: Attack of the Toybots, and Nicktoons MLB.

== Future ==
On January 5, 2016, Mitch Schauer mentioned on the Apathetic Enthusiasm Podcast episode titled "The Not So Angry Animator" that he would be open to the idea of bringing the series back and getting the original actors involved if he could. He also revealed that his daughter Chelsea Schauer came up with the title "ReSpooted" and that Norbert would be married and he would have children with Treeflower while Daggett would still be single.

On June 11, 2017, Patricia Miranda interviewed Schauer on her podcast titled Old School Lane and he brought up that it would be a parody of the 1980 Stanley Kubrick film The Shining. He also said he's pitched it to Nickelodeon and they've been "on and off" about it.

On January 7, 2018, Nickelodeon Animation's Tumblr page said this about the possibility of a revival: "Nothing's being whispered down the halls right now...but you never know!"

On April 19, 2022, Schauer and various people who worked on the series were interviewed again by Miranda in celebration of the twenty-fifth anniversary of the series. Mitch expanded upon the "ReSpooted" idea, stating that Norbert and Treeflower's children would be two daughters named Lily and Petunia and that Daggett would still visit them from time to time.
