= Up All Night =

Up All Night or Up All Nite may refer to:

== Film, television and radio ==
- Up All Night (film), or Friday Download: The Movie, a 2015 British film
- Up All Night (TV series), a 2011 American sitcom on NBC
- USA Up All Night, a 1989–1998 movie/variety show on the USA Network
- Up All Night (radio show), a UK news programme

=== Television episodes ===
- "Up All Night" (30 Rock), 2007
- "Up All Night" (The Adventures of Chuck and Friends), 2010
- "Up All Night" (The Angry Beavers), 1997
- "Up All Night" (The Bill), 1992
- "Up All Night" (Doctor Who), 2011
- "Up All Night" (Dream On), 1992
- "Up All Night" (Little Bear), 1995
- "Up All Night" (Mad About You), 1994
- "Up All Night" (Man Up!), 2011
- "Up All Night" (Modern Family), 2010
- "Up All Night" (My Gym Partner's a Monkey), 2006
- "Up All Night" (The Secret Life of the American Teenager), 2010
- "Up All Night" (Squirrel Boy), 2006
- "Up All Night" (Whitney), 2011

== Music ==
=== Albums ===
- Up All Night (The Chic Organization album), 2013
- Up All Night (East 17 album), 1995
- Up All Night (John Scofield album), 2003
- Up All Night (Kip Moore album) or the title song, 2012
- Up All Night (One Direction album) or the title song, 2011
- Up All Night (Pajama Party album), 1989
- Up All Night (Razorlight album) or the title song, 2004
- Up All Night (Rob Mills album), 2004
- Up All Night (The Waifs album) or the title song, 2003
- Up All Night – Deric Ruttan Live or the title song (see below), 2011
- Up All Night, by the Procussions, 2004

=== Songs ===
- "Up All Night" (Alex Clare song), 2010
- "Up All Night" (Blink-182 song), 2011
- "Up All Night" (Beck song), 2017
- "Up All Night" (Drake song), 2010
- "Up All Night" (Jon Pardi song), 2013
- "Up All Night" (Khalid song), 2019
- "Up All Night" (Matt Willis song), 2006
- "Up All Night" (Slaughter song), 1990
- "Up All Night" (Take That song), 2009
- "Up All Night" (Unwritten Law song), 2001
- "Up All Night" (Young Knives song), 2008
- "Up All Night", by Alice Cooper from The Revenge of Alice Cooper, 2025
- "Up All Night", by Best Coast from The Only Place, 2012
- "Up All Night", by the Boomtown Rats from V Deep, 1982
- "Up All Night", by Charlie Puth from Nine Track Mind, 2016
- "Up All Night", by Charlotte Martin from On Your Shore, 2004
- "Up All Night", by David Archuleta from Postcards in the Sky, 2017
- "Up All Night", by Deric Ruttan from Sunshine, 2010
- "Up All Night", by Hinder from Take It to the Limit, 2008
- "Up All Night", by iamnot, 2018
- "Up All Night", by James Bay featuring the Lumineers and Noah Kahan from Changes All the Time, 2024
- "Up All Night", by Joe Walsh from Ordinary Average Guy, 1991
- "Up All Night", by Lionel Richie from Coming Home, 2006
- "Up All Night", by Rachel Crow, 2019
- "Up All Night", by the Records from Shades in Bed, 1979
- "Up All Night", by Rosemary's Sons, 2002
- "Up All Night", by Suburban Legends from Rump Shaker, 2003
- "Up All Night", by the War on Drugs from A Deeper Understanding, 2017
- "Up All Night", by Widespread Panic from Free Somehow, 2008
- "Up All Nite", by DJ Maj from BoogiRoot, 2005

=== Concert tours and tour films ===
- Up All Night Tour, a 2011–2012 concert tour by One Direction
  - Up All Night: The Live Tour, a 2012 video documenting the tour
- Up All Night: Live in 2025, a concert tour by Jennifer Lopez

=== Labels ===
- Up All Nite Records, a record label founded by Too Short

== Other uses ==
- Nuit debout, a 2016 French protest movement known in English as Up All Night
- Up All Night, a young-adult novel by Sarah Weeks
- Up All Night, a comic strip by Michael Kupperman
