= Open All Night =

Open All Night may refer to:

- Open All Night (book), a 1922 short story collection by Paul Morand
  - Open All Night (1924 film), an American silent film directed by Paul Bern, based on Morand's book
- Open All Night (1934 film), a British drama directed by George Pearson
- Open All Night (TV series), a 1981-1982 American sitcom
- "Open All Night" (song), a 1982 song by Bruce Springsteen
- Open All Night (Georgia Satellites album), a 1988 album by Georgia Satellites
- Open All Night (Marc Almond album), a 1999 album by Marc Almond

== See also ==
- Up All Night (disambiguation)
