= Feels So Good (S-X song) =

2021 song by S-X

Single by S-X

from the album A Repeat Wouldn't Go a Miss
- Released: 28 May 2021
- Length: 2:44
- Label: RBC; BMG
- Songwriters: Sam Gumbley; Lasse Qvist
- Producers: S-X; Lasse Qvist

S-X singles chronology
"In Real Life" (2020)	"Feels So Good" (2021)

Music video
- "Feels So Good" on YouTube

"Feels So Good" is a song by British singer-songwriter and record producer S-X from his fourth mixtape, A Repeat Wouldn't Go a Miss (2021). The song was written and produced by S-X and Lasse Qvist. It was released for digital download and streaming by RBC Records and BMG on 28 May 2021 as the fourth single from the mixtape. The accompanying music video was released on the same day. An alternate stripped-back version of "Feels So Good" was released on 25 June 2021.

== Writing and production ==
S-X wrote and produced "Feels So Good" alongside record producer Lasse Qvist. Speaking on the making of "Feels So Good", S-X recalled, "I was in the studio for about four days locked in. And this was one of the last demos I made, at around 3 or 4AM during a very fun session. Sometimes it just comes to you when you least expect it. But that’s what I’m trying to bring with the new sound; just good vibes."

== Release and promotion ==
On 3 May 2021, S-X shared a snippet of "Feels So Good" to his social media pages. On 8 May 2021, S-X revealed the song's title, cover art and release date and the song was made available to pre-order on digital download services and pre-save on streaming services. "Feels So Good" was released for digital download and streaming by RBC Records and BMG on 28 May 2021.

== Critical reception ==
Philip Logan of CelebMix described "Feels So Good" as "an optimistic and highly addictive dance track that sees [S-X] develop his trademark melancholic melodies and innovative hip-hop beats, this time infused with eighties influences and futuristic finesse." Courtney Wynter of GRM Daily wrote, "S-X injects positivity into the song with his bold vocals on a high-spirited beat." Robin Murray of Clash called the song a "party starter [that amplifies] the hype" for S-X's upcoming mixtape. Melanie Lapierre of The Honey Pop noted that "Feels So Good" infuses influences from Justin Timberlake and Maroon 5.

== Music video ==
The music video for "Feels So Good" premiered on S-X's YouTube channel on 28 May 2021. The video was directed by Troy Roscoe. Courtney Wynter of GRM Daily wrote, "The feel-good nature of the song is perfectly captured in the [video] where we see S-X having a whale of a time at an intimate gig." A behind-the-scenes video of the music video shoot was released to S-X's YouTube channel on 8 June 2021.

== Alternate version ==
An alternate, stripped-back version of "Feels So Good" was released for digital download and streaming on 25 June 2021. The accompanying music video was released to S-X's YouTube channel on the same day.

== Credits and personnel ==
Credits adapted from Tidal.

- S-X – production, songwriting, vocals
- Lasse Qvist – production, songwriting
- Robert Marks – mixing
- Chris Gehringer – mastering
- Rob MacFarlane – engineering
- Joe Brice – assistant engineering

== Release history ==
Release dates and formats for "Feels So Good"
Region	Date	Format(s)	Version	Label(s)	Ref.
Various	28 May 2021	Digital download; streaming	Original	RBC; BMG	
Various	25 June 2021	Digital download; streaming	Alternate	RBC; BMG	
Various	21 September 2021	Digital download; streaming	Slowed and reverb	RBC; BMG	
