= List of The Angry Beavers episodes =

The Angry Beavers is an American animated television series created by Mitch Schauer for Nickelodeon. The series revolves around Daggett and Norbert Beaver, two young beaver brothers who have moved out of their parents' home to become bachelors in the forest near the fictional Wayouttatown, Oregon.

The pilot episode, entitled "Snowbound", was finished in 1994. The series officially premiered on April 19, 1997, and ended its initial run on November 11, 2003, with a total of 62 episodes (123 segments) over the course of 4 seasons. 4 episodes would not premiere in the United States on Nickelodeon during its initial run and would premiere in that country on Nicktoons in 2006, with the last episode airing on August 27. The series has also appeared in syndication on Nickelodeon Canada from 2009 to 2017. The complete series has also been released on DVD in Region 1 by Shout! Factory.

== Series overview ==
Season	Segments	Episodes		Originally released	
Season	Segments	Episodes		First released	Last released
Pilot				—N/a	
1	26	13		April 19, 1997	September 28, 1997
2	25	13		March 1, 1998	November 21, 1998
3	44	22		March 14, 1999	March 18, 2000
4	18	14 (Note: Every season four episode (barring "Specs Appeal" / "Things That Go Hook in the Night") aired early on YTV.)	9	October 14, 2000 (YTV) January 6, 2001 (Nickelodeon)	March 10, 2001 (YTV) November 11, 2003 (Nickelodeon)
4	10	14	5	June 11, 2006 (Nicktoons)	August 27, 2006 (Nicktoons)

== Episodes ==
=== Pilot (1994) ===
Mitch Schauer originally created a test pilot episode of The Angry Beavers for Nickelodeon in 1994, entitled "Snowbound". The pilot was later found in 2013 on a bootleg DVD and has been uploaded on the internet many times since then.

Title	Animation direction by	Story by	Production date
"Snowbound"	Brian Ray & Mike Lyman	Mitch Schauer & Karl Toerge	1994
When the TV breaks down, Norb and Dag try to do something fun.

=== Season 1 (1997) ===
No. overall	No. in season	Title	Directed by	Written by	Storyboard by	Original release date	Prod. code	U.S. households (millions)
1	1	"Born to Be Beavers" "Up All Night"	Robert Hughes	Mitchell Schauer Victor Wilson	Mitchell Schauer & Michael R. Gerard	April 19, 1997	001	2.33
Norbert and Daggett, the beaver brothers, live life on their own for the first time. The beavers realise they can stay up late if they want.
2	2	"A Dam Too Far" "Long in the Teeth"	Robert Hughes George Chialtas	Mitchell Schauer Keith Kaczorek	Mitchell Schauer & Michael R. Gerard	April 27, 1997	002B 002A	2.40
Dag fights to dam up a river, despite it being a flood zone. Norb grows his teeth too long, which becomes a fashion statement at first, but causes problems in everyday life. Note: This episode marks the first appearance of Treeflower. She is seen flirting with Norb in this episode, but in Episode 13A, “Bummer of Love”, they are shown meeting for the first time. Mitch Schauer confirmed that this episode takes place after the latter.
3	3	"Gift Hoarse" "Go Beavers!"	Robert Hughes Bobtown Productions	Mitchell Schauer Keith Kaczorek	Joel Seibel Mario D'Anna	May 4, 1997	003	2.28
It's Beaver Christmas and Dag is upset because Norb gets a better present. The beavers go to a football game.
4	4	"Box Top Beavers" "Salmon Sez"	Robert Hughes Justin Michael	John Derevlany Victor Wilson	Joel Seibel, Mitchell Schauer & Michael R. Gerard Chris Dent & Mario D'Anna	May 11, 1997	004	2.35
Wanting to get better cereal prizes than Norb, Dag saves cereal box-tops to get a street sweeper, but takes so long that the time he obtains enough is the time the offer expires. Spawning salmon invade the beavers' lake, and Norb and Dag try to get them to go away.
5	5	"Beach Beavers a-Go-Go" "Deranged Ranger"	Rob Hughes Patti Shinagawa	Victor Wilson John Derevlany	Mark O'Hare Chris Dent	June 1, 1997	005	2.89
Not wanting to hibernate in the winter, Dag and Norb take a vacation to the beach. Dag becomes the new ranger of the forest, but power goes to his head.
6	6	"Muscular Beaver" "Fish 'n' Dips"	Patty Shinagawa Rob Hughes	John Derevlany Jordanna Arlkin	Joel Seibel Chris Dent	June 8, 1997	006	2.35
Dag's hero role playing goes too far, so Norb must act like a super-villain to defeat him. Dag is terrified when a monster fish eats the tip of his tail.
7	7	"Enter the Daggett" "Bug-a-Boo"	Bobtown Productions Justin Michael	Mark Palmer Kat Likkel	Mitchell Schauer & Ty Schafrath Mario D'Anna, Bob Foster, Ty Schafrath & Dave Rodriguez	June 22, 1997	007	N/A
Dag tries becoming braver with "Ninja-Robics" tape. Dag fears a giant cricket that ends up in the dam.
8	8	"Mission to the Big Hot Thingy" "I Dare You"	Patty Shinagawa Robert Hughes	John Derevlany	Mario D'Anna & Mark O'Hare Joel Seibel	June 29, 1997	008	2.17
Norb and Dag embark on a space mission to the sun, but they get lost in space. Norb and Dag incessantly "dare" each other.
9	9	"Stinky Toe" "House Broken"	Pam Garry Patty Shinagawa & Robert Hughes	Frank Santopadre Victor Wilson	Chris Dent Mario D'Anna, Bob Foster & Dave Rodriguez	July 13, 1997	009B 009A	2.07
Norb gets a case of "stinky toe", a rare and incurable disease for beavers, so Dag attempts to help his brother. Norb and Dag decide to become pets and get adopted by an overly normal family.
10	10	"Tree's Company" "Guess Who's Stumping to Dinner"	Robert Hughes Bobtown Productions	John Derevlany Keith Kaczorek	Mitch Schauer & Mario D'Anna Mario D'Anna & Mark O'Hare	July 20, 1997	010	2.02
Dag decides to throw a party after feeling ignored when Norb wants alone time to build a model. Norb befriends Stump and Dag gets jealous.
11	11	"Fancy Prance" "H2Whoa!"	Robert Hughes Patty Shinagawa	Keith Kaczorek Victor Wilson	Joel Seibel Chris Dent	August 3, 1997	011	2.37
Norb lives his dream of being a Lipizzaner stallion. Dag and Norb find a brand new water park, so they build their own ride.
12	12	"The Bing That Wouldn't Leave" "You Promised"	Robert Hughes Patty Shinagawa	Victor Wilson	Joel Seibel Mario D'Anna, Ty Schafrath & Bob Foster	August 10, 1997	012	2.24
Norb and Dag meet a new friend named Bing, a motor-mouthed lizard who becomes annoyingly clingy. Dag writes a note on his eyelids to remind him of Norb's promise a year later.
13	13	"Bummer of Love" "Food of the Clods"	Patty Shinagawa Robert Hughes	Keith Kaczorek Mitchell Schauer	Chris Dent & Joel Seibel Mario D'Anna & Ty Schafrath	September 28, 1997	013	2.25
Dag tries to blow up the hippie concert on their property while Norb falls in love with a female beaver named Treeflower. Norb sleepwalks while watching movies and Dag intends to prove his brother's crazy habit.

=== Season 2 (1998) ===
No. overall	No. in season	Title	Directed by	Written by	Storyboard by	Original release date	Prod. code	U.S. households (millions)
14	1	"Beaver Fever" "Same Time Last Week"	Robert Hughes Patty Shinagawa	Keith Kaczorek Kat Likkel	Mario D'Anna Ty Schafrath	March 1, 1998	015	2.64
Norb and Dag become disco stars. Dag annoys Norb and repeatedly gets bopped into last week in a parody of Groundhog Day.
15	2	"Kandid Kreatures" "Fakin' It"	Patty Shinagawa Robert Hughes	Glenn Ficarra & John Requa John Derevlany	Chris Dent Joel Seibel	March 8, 1998	014	2.51
Norb and Dag get humiliated on a TV show, so the beavers take their revenge on Bill Licking. Norb fakes being sick so that Dag can cater to his every whim, but later, Dag decides that the tables should be turned.
16	3	"Muscular Beaver 2" "Stump Looks for His Roots"	Patty Shinagawa Robert Hughes	John Derevlany	Mitchell Schauer & Michael R. Gerard Mitchell Schauer, Michael R. Gerard & Joel Seibel	March 15, 1998	016	N/A
Muscular Beaver and Baron Von Beaver join forces to defeat the giant monster tree. Norb and Dag try to find Stump after Norb hurts Stump's feelings for telling him the truth about his roots (family).
17	4	"Tree of Hearts" "Dag for Night"	Patty Shinagawa Robert Hughes	John Derevlany Glenn Ficarra & John Requa	Ty Schafrath Mario D'Anna	March 22, 1998	017	2.61
Treeflower has the hots for Truckee, much to Norb's dismay. Norb and Dag attempt to make a film after finding a lost reel.
18	5	"Un-Barry-ble" "Another One Bites the Musk"	Patty Shinagawa	Glenn Ficarra & John Requa John Derevlany	Ty Schafrath Chris Dent	April 5, 1998	018	N/A
Dag and Norb attend to find the groove for their friend Barry. Dag learns the beaver defence and use his muck to mark everything that belongs to Norb and his brother is doing the thing with Dag's stuff.
19	6	"The Mighty Knot-Head" "Pond Scum"	Robert Hughes	Kati Rocky & John Derevlany Keith Kaczorek	Joel Seibel Mario D'Anna & Mitchell Schauer	April 26, 1998	019	N/A
Dag becomes worshiped by the female raccoon tribe. An evil pond scum possesses Norb to do bad things, so it's up to Dag to save his brother.
20	7	"Utter Nonsense" "Endangered Species"	Patty Shinagawa Robert Hughes	Mitchell Schauer Keith Kaczorek	Snicky Arnsgunkle Mario D'Anna	July 19, 1998	020	2.18
Norb and Dag jinx one another in a game of slient and wits in just one whole day by trying to trick each other into speaking and giving them a moogy-pinch. The two scientists mistake Dag for a long extinct horned beaver and Norb tries to rescue his brother.
21	8	"Lumberjack's Delight" "Zooing Time"	Robert Hughes	Dan Povenmire Glenn Ficarra & John Requa	Mario D'Anna Joel Seibel	August 16, 1998	021	N/A
Singing lumberjacks invade the forest and the beaver brothers uses strategy to save the forest. Dag tries to break Norb out of the zoo however Norb's enjoying his new life in the zoo.
22	9	"Friends, Romans, Beavers!" "Big Round Sticky Fish Thingy"	Patty Shinagawa Robert Hughes	John Derevlany Keith Kaczorek	Ty Schafrath, Mitch Schauer & Michael Gerard Joel Seibel	September 27, 1998	022	N/A
Norb and Dag get zapped back in time to the age of Romans. Norb and Dag find a giant fish egg in their pond.
23	10	"The Day the World Got Really Screwed Up!"	Patty Shinagawa	Mitch Schauer	Mitch Schauer, John Statema & Michael R. Gerard	October 26, 1998	026	N/A
In this double-length halloween special, an alien object lands behind the house of Norb and Dag's favorite movie star.
24	11	"If You In-Sisters" "Alley Oops"	Robert Hughes Swinton Scott	Mitch Schauer John Derevlany	Ty Schafrath, Mitch Schauer & Michael Gerard Joel Seibel	November 7, 1998	023	N/A
Norb and Dag's two younger sisters visit them, but the brothers disagree on whether to let them do whatever they want or to use a list. Dag becomes a bowler with the help from Laverta Lutz.
25	12	"Open Wide for Zombies" "Dumbwaiters"	Patty Shinagawa Robert Hughes	Keith Kaczorek	Snicky Arnsgunkle Mario D'Anna	November 14, 1998	024	N/A
Norb and Dag go to a haunted swamp full of zombies. Norb and Dag work as waiters in an attempt to buy masks.
26	13	"Sans-a-Pelt" "Gonna Getcha"	Robert Hughes Patty Shinagawa	John Requa & Glenn Ficarra	Kelly James Chris Dent	November 21, 1998	025	N/A
Norb and Dag lose their fur after a botched magic trick. Dag fears Norb will get him back after farting on his brother's head during a game.

=== Season 3 (1999–2000) ===
No. overall	No. in season	Title	Directed by	Written by	Storyboard by	Original release date	Prod. code
27	1	"My Bunnyguard" "What's Eating You?"	Robert Hughes	John Requa & Glenn Ficarra Dan Povenmire	Gary Conrad, Mitchell Schauer and Michael R. Gerard Joel Seibel, Mitchell Schauer and Michael R. Gerard	March 14, 1999	027
Dag and Norb hire Big Rabbit to be their bodyguard after receiving a threatening message. Norb and Dag are trapped in a cave with Stump, whom they try to prevent themselves from eating him.
28	2	"Omega Beaver" "Bite This!"	Robert Hughes Gary Conrad	Micah Wright Keith Kaczorek	Kelly James, Mitchell Schauer and Michael R. Gerard Ty Schafrath and Mario D'Anna	March 21, 1999	028
Dag tries to protect his dam from the howler leeches during a snowstorm. Norb becomes a bed biter in his sleep and he looks for a way to get himself to stop.
29	3	"Spooky Spoots" "Up All Night 2: Up All Day – The Reckoning"	Patty Shinagawa Gary Conrad	Micah Wright Keith Kaczorek	Chris Dent Joel Seibel, Mitchell Schauer and Michael R. Gerard	March 28, 1999	029
Norb and Dag try to protect their ghost friends from being taken away from the two scientists. Continuing from "Up All Night", Dag and Norb return to the present and then attempt to go to sleep, but realize that they're too tired to sleep. As a result, yet more mayhem than the previous episode, such as sheep taking over the house and hallucinations, ensues. When Dag and Norb finally fall asleep, not only do they sleep so long that they become elders, but the sheep take over the entire world.
30	4	"Muscular Beaver 3" "Sang'em High"	Patty Shinagawa Gary Conrad	John Derevlany	Chris Dent Joel Seibel	April 4, 1999	030
Dag gets a cold, so Treeflower nurses him and pretends to be Muscular Beaver's new sidekick. Norb gets jealous by this. Laverta Lutz teaches Dag how to win arguments, telling him that "the argument's over when the fat beaver sings." As a result, Dag ends every argument that Norb puts him in by starting musical numbers--until Norb tells him that he actually loves one of the songs and tries to get him to sing it again.
31	5	"In Search of Big Byoo-Tox" "Moronathon Man"	Robert Hughes	Sultan Pepper John Derevlany	Gary Conrad and Mario D'Anna Kelly James and Mario D'Anna	April 11, 1999	031
Dag tries to get Norb's toy duck away from the help of a mystical creature. The two scientists accidentally dump a potion of stupidity in the lake, weakening the intelligence of everyone except Dag (since Dag can't get any dumber).
32	6	"The Legend of Kid Friendly" "Silent But Deadly"	Gary Conrad Patty Shinagawa	Keith Kaczorek (original script); Keith Kaczorek, Mitchell Schauer, Charlie Brisette, Dan Povenmire & Jeff Marsh (songs) John Requa & Glenn Ficarra	Kelly James Chris Dent	April 18, 1999	032
Norb and Dag star in a Western episode and face the robotic Kid Friendly. Norb and Dag try to escape their dam full of wolverines without speaking.
33	7	"Tough Love" "A Little Dad'll Do You"	Patty Shinagawa Robert Hughes	Kati Rocky John Derevlany	Kelly James Joel Seibel	June 20, 1999	034
Bing's girlfriend breaks up with him, causing an emotional breakdown. Norb and Dag, however, want to help Bing and his love get back together. Norb and Dag's father visits them, and things get out of control.
34	8	"Pass It On!" "Stump's Family Reunion"	Robert Hughes Gary Conrad	John Requa & Glenn Ficarra Dashel Thompson & Gary Scott Thompson	Chris Dent, Joel Seibel, Mario D'Anna, Michael Kim, and Rhoydon Shishido Kelly James	August 7, 1999	033
Norb and Dag, along with their friends, make up a story. Norb gets an earache as he and Dag are invited to Stump's family reunion.
35	9	"Muscular Beaver 4" "Act Your Age"	Patty Shinagawa Gary Conrad	John Derevlany Keith Kaczorek	Jim Schumann Joel Seibel	August 14, 1999	037
Norb and friends try to save Muscular Beaver from Toebot's clutches. Norb and Dag bite the magical oldest tree that turns them into kids, so they try to get it to have an acorn to themselves.
36	10	"Too Loose Latrine" "Pack Your Dags"	Patty Shinagawa	John Derevlany Mary Jo Smith and Barry Stringfellow	Joel Seibel Chris Dent	August 21, 1999	035
Dag accidentally clogs the downstairs toilet while Norb tries to get his hair just right. Norb becomes possessed with his instinct as he packs away to leave the dam.
37	11	"Daggy Dearest" "Dag's List"	Gary Conrad Robert Hughes	Kati Rocky Micah Wright	Kelly James Joel Seibel	August 28, 1999	036
Dag believes he gave birth to a baby mongoose after a huge meal. Dag carries a list in which the animals think they'll be on when Barry gets hurt with Dag's rocket pen. Norb takes advantage of his friends by taking all of their stuff for promising to get them all off the list. The animals find out the list was harmless. They all go to confront Norb, angry at him for scheming them out of their possessions. In the end, Barry, Bing, and others affected beat Norb up in order to teach him a lesson.
38	12	"Mistaken Identity" "Easy Peasy Rider"	Gary Conrad Robert Hughes	John Requa Victor Wilson	Chris Dent Kelly James	September 11, 1999	038
Norb and Dag fight over who will move a Russian spaceship off the roof. Dag joins a biker gang as their new leader and Norb searches for his dimwit brother.
39	13	"Stare and Stare Alike!" "I Am Not an Animal, I'm Scientist #1"	Gary Conrad Robert Hughes	John Requa & Glenn Ficarra Dan Povenmire	Carolyn Gair Taylor Kelly James	September 25, 1999	039
Norb and Dag attempt to win the staring contest for an award. Scientist #1 becomes a beaver and offers the beaver brothers a new future of the world.
40	14	"El Grapadura y el Castor Malo" "The Loogie Hawk"	Patty Shinagawa Gary Conrad	Glenn Ficarra & John Requa Keith Kaczorek	Jim Schumann Chris Headrick	October 16, 1999	040
Norb and Dag star in a Spanish-speaking episode with El Grapadura. Norb and Dag try to rid a hawk that spreads its saliva everywhere.
41	15	"Kreature Komforts" "Oh, Brother?"	Robert Hughes Gary Conrad	John Requa & Glenn Ficarra Micah Wright	Chris Headrick Joel Seibel	October 23, 1999	042
Norb and Dag's cousin visits making several home changes. Dag and Norb meet their ugly doppelgängers for a biologically related connection.
42	16	"Das Spoot" "Sqotters"	Robert Hughes Patty Shinagawa	Victor Wilson	Jim Schumann Rhoydon Shishido	November 6, 1999	043
Norb and Dag explore deeper of their lake in a submarine. A group of otters takes over Norb and Dag's dam.
43	17	"Long Tall Daggy" "Practical Jerks"	Pat Shinagawa Robert Hughes	Victor Wilson Merry Williams	Carolyn Gair Taylor Joel Seibel	December 4, 1999	041
Norb is distraught when he finds out that Dag is taller than him. Norb and Dag discover that someone is pulling pranks on them.
44	18	"Nice & Lonely" "Soccer? I Hardly Knew Him!"	Robert Hughes Gary Conrad	Victor Wilson Keith Kaczorek	Joel Seibel Sandra Frame and Bob Curtis	December 11, 1999	045
Norb and Dag fight over Bing. Dag learns a new game.
45	19	"Brothers... to the End?" "Euro Beavers"	Gary Conrad Robert Hughes	Mitch Schauer Barry Stringfellow	Mitch Schauer and Michael R. Gerard Jim Schumann	December 31, 1999	048
The new millennium forces Norb and Dag to recreate the earth. Dag wakes up for springtime and finds Norb going European and Dag tries to get his brother back to his American beaver self in order to re-twig the dam.
46	20	"Slap Happy" "Home Loners"	Brad Neave Patty Shinagawa	Barry Stringfellow Glenn Ficarra & John Requa	David Earl Chris Headrick	March 4, 2000	046
Dag abuses the beaver call of distress. Norb and Dag both think they are home alone and invaded by aliens and monster pests.
47	21	"Ugly Roomers" "Finger Lickin' Goofs"	Gary Conrad Eduardo Soriano	Micah Wright Merriwether Williams	Chris Dent Sam To	March 11, 2000	047
Norb and Dag build their own bedrooms. Norb and Dag are convinced Barry wants to eat them when they watch Bill Licking's show.
48	22	"Strange Allure" "Partying Is Such Sweet Sorrow"	Brad Neave	Keith Kaczorek	Lazarino Baarde and Phil Caesar Louie Escauriaga	March 18, 2000	049
Dag falls in love with a fishing lure attached to his tail, not knowing that she is dangerous because of her "surface" life. Norb and Dag try to get a party ready, but it gets out of control when they begin messing about and enjoying themselves.

=== Season 4 (2000–03; 2006) ===
Various episodes during this season went unaired on the main Nickelodeon network, instead making their worldwide debut on the Canadian children's channel, YTV. These episodes would premiere in the U.S. on Nicktoons in 2006. In addition, a few leftover episodes in production order were aired at the very end of its run. As such, each date is listed in two separate columns.

No. overall	No. in season	Title	Directed by	Written by	Storyboard by	Canadian airdate	American airdate	Prod. code	Viewers (millions)
49	1	"Chocolate Up to Experience" "Three Dag Nite"	Gary Conrad Eduardo Soriano	Kati Rocky Barry Stringfellow	Rhoydon Shishido Sam To	November 1, 2000	January 13, 2001	050	N/A
Norb makes Dag sell chocolate bars, but ends up trying to sell one for $200 while he eats the rest out of an addiction to chocolate. Dag clones himself, but the clones prove unruly.
50	2	"Fat Chance" "Dag in the Mirror"	Rob Hughes Eduardo Soriano	John Requa & Glenn Ficarra Keith Kaczorek	Joel Seibel Dave Pemberton	November 4, 2000	January 20, 2001	053	N/A
Norb tries to help Dag fatten up before the winter, when they plan to hibernate. Dag becomes an underwear model.
51	3	"Canucks Amuck" "Yak in the Sack"	Rob Hughes Patty Shinagawa	Victor Wilson Micah Wright	Joel Seibel Chris Headrick	November 6, 2000	January 27, 2001	054	2.88 2.00 (HH) (Note: (HH) denotes how many households the episode was viewed in.)
Two Canadian beavers take up residence in the brothers' dam. The beavers are visited by a magical Yak (a parody of The Cat in the Hat). Guest star: John de Lancie as the Yak
52	4	"Driving Misses Daggett" "Big Fun"	Eduardo Soriano Brad Neave & Roger Jakubiec	Victor Wilson Roger Eschbacher	Dave Pemberton Louie Escauriaga	November 7, 2000	November 11, 2003	055	N/A
While playing golf inside their house, Norb taunts Dag with the promise of letting him drive the golf cart. Norb and Dag accompany Big Rabbit on a visit to his parents' house.
53	5	"Moby Dopes" "Present Tense"	Patty Shinagawa Gary Conrad	Barry Stringfellow Kati Rocky	Chris Dent Kelly James	November 8, 2000	January 13, 2001	056	N/A
Dag steals a killer whale that wreaks havoc in the brothers' pond. Dag and Norb receive a present from their mother that refuses to open itself until midnight but in the end the present turned out to be from Scientist Num. 1 And Pete.
54	6	"It's a Spootiful Life" "The Mom from U.N.C.L.E."	Gary Conrad Patty Shinagawa	Victor Wilson Barry Stringfellow	Chris Dent Chris Headrick	November 9, 2000	January 20, 2001	057	N/A
The Lady of the Lane shows Dag what it would be like if he had never been born. The boys' mother pays a visit, but turns out to be working as a spy.
55	7	"House Sisters" "Muscular Beaver 5"	Patty Shinagawa	Gailard Sartain & Mary Jo Sartain Micah Wright	Jim Schumann Jay Lender	November 10, 2000	January 6, 2001	058 (Note: This episode is also listed under the production code of "060" on YTV's old episode guide, although that is likely incorrect considering that one episode ("Specs Appeal" / "Things That Go Hook in the Night") did not air in Canada.)	N/A
The beaver brothers are going away to a Tumblebug pageant, so they get their sisters to look after the dam. Dag gives up being Muscular Beaver, to the delight of Baron Von Bad Beaver.
56	8	"Vantastic Voyage" "Blacktop Beavers"	Rob Hughes Gary Conrad	Victor Wilson Glenn Ficarra & John Requa	Jim Schumann Rhoydon Shishido	November 11, 2000	August 6, 2006 (Nicktoons)	059	N/A
The scientists travel inside a gigantic Dag and attempt to crush Norb. The beavers race a trucker (who is revealed to be Truckee in the end) to the world's largest pile of toenail clippings.
57	9	"Specs Appeal" "Things That Go Hook in the Night"	Brad Neave Eduardo Soriano	Roger Eschbacher Kati Rocky	Glen Lovett Sam To	Unaired	January 6, 2001	060	N/A
Norb and Dag get a pair of X-ray glasses. During a backyard campout, Norb tries to scare Dag with a story about a maniac with a hook, but soon believes his own story and becomes paranoid in thinking that the creature is coming to get him.
58	10	"Damnesia" "The Posei-Dam Adventure"	Brad Neave Eduardo Soriano	Micah Wright	Louie Escauriaga Phil Caesar & Louie Escauriaga	March 10, 2001	January 27, 2001	062	2.91 2.05 (HH)
When the dam accidentally falls on Norb's head, he develops "damnesia" and forgets who he is. A raging "volnado" (half volcano, half tornado) capsizes the Beavers' dam upside down during a party and have Daggett and Truckee trapped.
59	11	"The Big Frog" "Dag Con Carny"	Brad Neave Eduardo Soriano	Katy Rocky Roger Eschbacher	Louie Escauriaga Sam To	November 14, 2000	August 27, 2006 (Nicktoons)	061	N/A
Norb tells Dag to lose the kiddy toys and grow up, but he takes it too seriously and earns himself the name Big Frog. Dag and Norb get jobs at Smelly Jim's Carnival of Mirthiness.
60	12	"All in the Colony" "Line Duncing"	Patty Shinagawa	Micah Wright Keith Kaczorek	Kelly James	November 2, 2000	June 25, 2006 (Nicktoons)	051	N/A
Dag and Norb attempt to save their dam from an army of Australian termites. Norb and Dag take their young sisters to an ice skating show as they wait forever in a long line.
61	13	"Beavemaster" "Deck Poops"	Gary Conrad Rob Hughes	Micah Wright Mitch Schauer	Chris Dent Jim Schumann	November 3, 2000	July 23, 2006 (Nicktoons)	052	N/A
Norb and Dag try to battle off a dimwitted warrior. Norb attempts to save Dag from a band of pirate rats.
62	14	"Dagski and Norb" "Shell or High Water"	Patty Shinagawa Gary Conrad	Keith Kaczorek John Requa & Glenn Ficarra	Chris Dent Kelly James	October 14, 2000	June 11, 2006 (Nicktoons)	044	N/A
Dag and Norb star in a show resembling Starsky & Hutch. Norb and Dag go to the beach and build sandcastles.

==== Scrapped episodes ====
Various episodes from the series ended up being scrapped. "A Tail of Two Rangers" / "Bye Bye Beavers" was never animated due to the latter breaking Nickelodeon's rule against "final episodes" that reference the fact that the show is ending. In around 2001, an archived version YTV's website confirmed this episode, alongside two others (#064 - "Sister Pilot" and #065 - "The Angry Beavers Rock Opera," two half-hour specials). Don Del Grande's episode guide denotes two other scrapped shows: another Halloween special, "The Very Loud Screams of the Night Beast" and a stand-alone segment entitled "Tree Troubles." (mistakenly listed as "Tree Flockers.") The latter's script cover can be found on an archived version of Micah Wright's website.

Title	Animation director(s)	Written by	Prod. code
"A Tail of Two Rangers" "Bye Bye Beavers"	Gary Conrad Rob Hughes	Roger Eschbacher Keith Kaczorek	065
Another ranger takes over and turns the forest into some kind of army camp for the animals, so Dag and Norb try to track down Ranger Phil (this time voiced by Robert Stack), to talk him into returning. The beavers are informed that the show is ending, so they break the fourth wall, call each other by their real names, and air reruns on Nickelodeon without the voice actors getting paid, only to fool the fans.
"Simply Sisters"	TBA	TBA	064
A planned spin-off pilot episode starring Norb and Dag's sisters.
"The Angry Beavers Rock Opera (a.k.a “Magnum Opus”)"	TBA	TBA	TBA
A planned musical episode.
"The Very Loud Screams of the Night Beast"	TBA	TBA	TBA
Norbert and Daggett visit Transylvania, where Dag is bitten by Dracula and it's up to vampire hunter Gabriel Van Helsing to save them.
"Tree Troubles"	TBA	Micah Wright	530
