= Down Like That =

2019 song by KSI featuring Rick Ross, Lil Baby and S-X

Single by KSI featuring Rick Ross, Lil Baby and S-X

from the album Dissimulation
- Released: 8 November 2019
- Genre: Hip hop
- Length: 2:55
- Label: RBC; BMG
- Songwriters: Olajide Olatunji; William Roberts II; Dominique Jones; Sam Gumbley; Byron Trice
- Producer: S-X

KSI singles chronology
"Red Alert" (2019)	"Down Like That" (2019)	"Wake Up Call" (2020)

Rick Ross singles chronology
"Gold Roses" (2019)	"Down Like That" (2019)	"Gimmie Brain" (2019)

Lil Baby singles chronology
"Tootsies" (2019)	"Down Like That" (2019)	"Woah" (2019)

S-X singles chronology
"Too Soon" (2019)	"Down Like That" (2019)	"Neither Would I" (2020)

Music video
- "Down Like That" on YouTube

"Down Like That" is a song by British YouTuber and rapper KSI featuring American rappers Rick Ross and Lil Baby and British singer-songwriter S-X. Produced by the latter and written alongside Byron Trice, it was released for digital download and streaming by RBC Records and BMG on 8 November 2019 as the lead single from KSI's debut studio album, Dissimulation (2020). "Down Like That" stood as KSI's first release through the record label after signing with them in the October of that year.

"Down Like That" is a hip hop track. In the emo-inspired chorus, S-X sings about a failed relationship with a partner who has let him down. He delivers the first half of the chorus in a modal vocal register, before adopting a falsetto vocal register for the second half, which is preceded by a dubstep-inspired beat drop. In his verse, KSI alludes to his forthcoming boxing rematch against American YouTuber Logan Paul. The song was performed live by the three featured artists as KSI's entrance music for the rematch, held on 9 November 2019 at the Staples Center in Los Angeles, United States, which KSI went on to win via split decision.

The song received generally positive reviews from music critics, with many praising its hard-hitting sound and S-X's catchy chorus. "Down Like That" is considered to mark the beginning of KSI's mainstream success in his career as a recording artist. The song peaked at number 10 on the UK Singles Chart, becoming KSI's first UK top 10 single, and it has been certified gold by the British Phonographic Industry (BPI) for exceeding sales of 400,000 units in the UK. The song additionally entered the music charts of Canada, Estonia, Greece, Ireland, Latvia, Lithuania and New Zealand.

The music video was filmed two days after KSI's boxing rematch against Paul, and it was released on the 22nd of November, 2019. The cinematic video places the four artists in a dystopian and apocalyptic warehouse, amongst motorcycles, burned out cars, trash can fires and rubble concrete. An alternative music video that uses footage from KSI's boxing rematch against Paul was released a month after the original music video, on the 4th of December, 2019.

== Writing and production ==
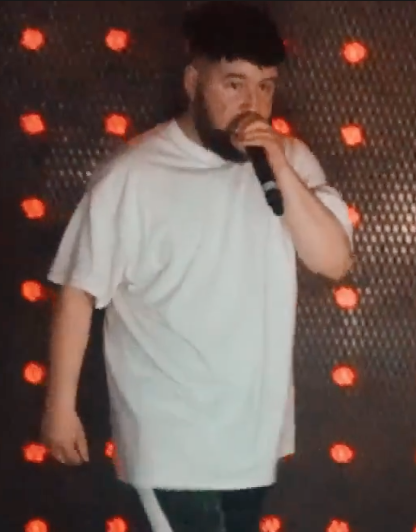
British singer-songwriter and record producer S-X performs the chorus in addition to handling the song's production.

S-X wrote and recorded the chorus and produced "Down Like That" in his home recording studio in Wolverhampton, England. He used the digital audio workstation FL Studio to produce the song. The chorus developed from S-X singing a melody and making up the lyrics along the way, which he recorded using the voice memos app on his smartphone. S-X played the chorus to KSI, who expressed interest in it. KSI recalled, "I [knew that it would] go nuts at festivals... This is the type of [song] that people mosh to and go crazy over. So I was like, 'I need to be on this [song].'" KSI wrote and recorded several verses for "Down Like That" with the intention of it being his entrance music for KSI vs. Logan Paul II – his forthcoming professional boxing rematch against American YouTuber Logan Paul, to be held on 9 November 2019 at the Staples Center in Los Angeles, United States, following the pair's previous amateur boxing match which resulted in a majority draw.

KSI and his manager Mams Taylor spoke about making "Down Like That" "way bigger than [they] initially thought" by featuring some other rappers on the song. KSI started to think of British rappers, before Taylor suggested featuring American rappers because the rematch would be taking place in the United States. KSI recalled, "We were thinking of [American rappers] to get. We thought, 'It would be insane if we could try and manage to get Rick Ross. Rick Ross would work.' And he said yes to it." He continued, "On the final verse, we wanted to switch it up. We wanted to have something different. We didn't want a similar vibe to me and Rick Ross. But still someone who's up there with the top rappers. We were like, 'Let's go for Lil Baby.' And he said yes." KSI recalled that he and S-X were "going nuts" when they received Rick Ross' and Lil Baby's verses.

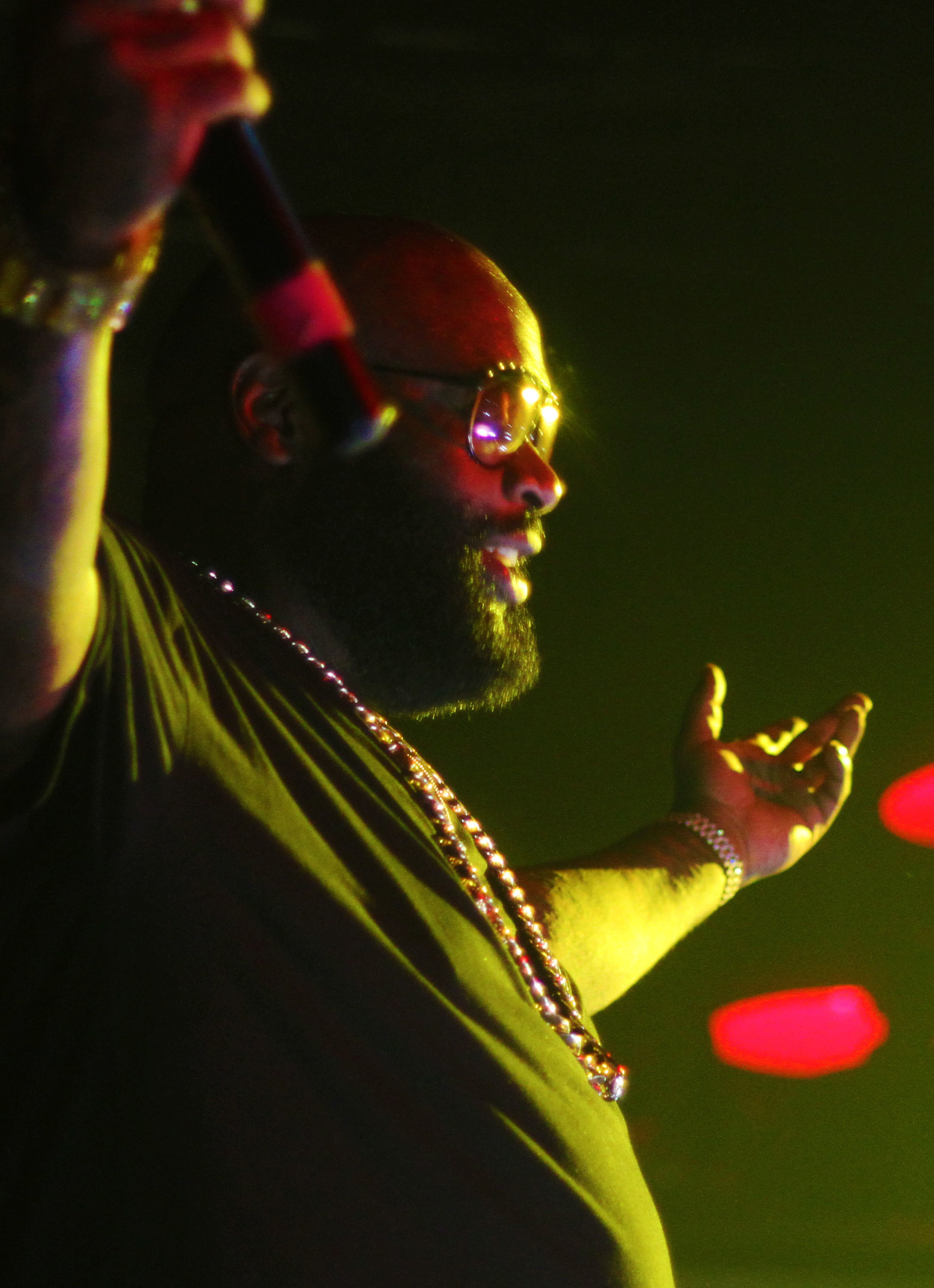
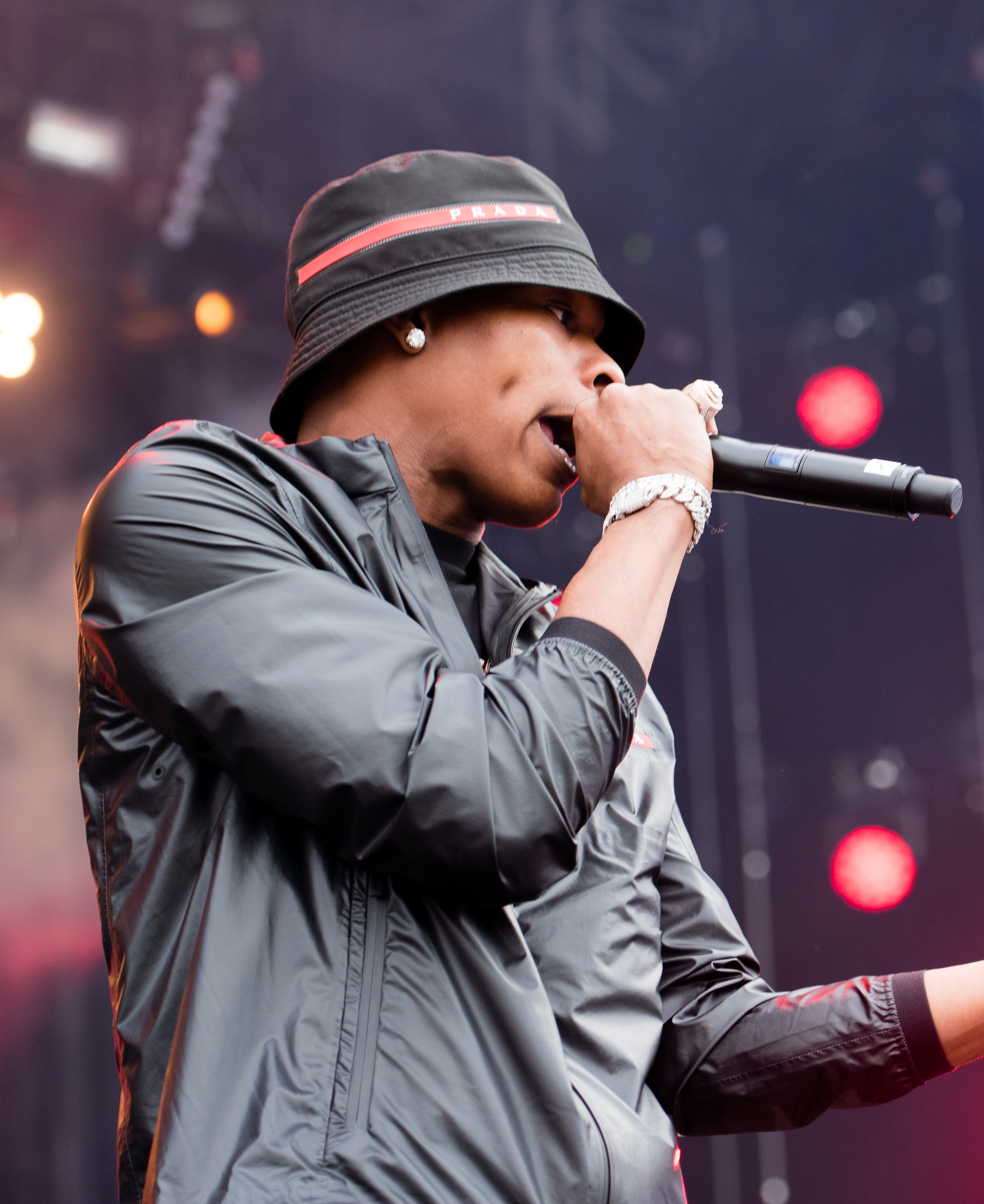
American rappers Rick Ross (left) and Lil Baby (right) are featured on "Down Like That".

KSI has said he was shocked that both Rick Ross and Lil Baby wanted to be involved with the song. Speaking on Lil Baby's involvement, KSI said, "I didn't expect Lil Baby to want to hop on [the song]. The beat is very different to what he normally hops on. But he came in, did his thing and just killed it." Lil Baby reaffirmed this, saying, "[The song's] a different vibe from what I usually rap on. It was outside the box for me." Regarding the involvement of Rick Ross, KSI said, "It's insane. To manage to get him to come through. It's ridiculous... It's a dream come true." Speaking on being part of the collaboration, Rick Ross said, "It's really exciting... [KSI's] a young hustler. This younger generation really tuned into him. So I'm happy to be a part of it." KSI affirmed, "It's definitely an honour to have [Rick Ross and Lil Baby] on [the song]. And it's gassed me up. It's shown me that I'm able to rap with these guys. I can make sick songs and I can have sick features."

== Music and lyrics ==
"Down Like That"
A 27-second sample of S-X's chorus, in which he sings about a failed relationship with a partner who has let him down. He delivers the first half of the chorus in a modal vocal register, before adopting a falsetto vocal register for the second half, which is preceded by a dubstep-inspired beat drop.

"Down Like That" is a hip hop track. The instrumental uses a pre-generated loop, to which S-X added a bassline, keyboard notes, hi-hats, snare drum kicks and 808s. S-X performs the chorus, in which he sings about a failed relationship with a partner who has let him down, with lyrics including, "I was nothing but loyal to you right from the start" and "you changed up on me as soon as things were getting hard". He delivers the first half of the chorus in a modal vocal register, before adopting a falsetto vocal register for the second half, which is preceded by a dubstep-inspired beat drop. KSI has described the chorus as having "an emo-ish vibe". KSI raps the first verse, in which he alludes to his forthcoming boxing rematch against Paul, with lyrics including, "I want that knockdown" and "emitting pain 'til your nothing". The song has been called a "fight night anthem" due to its association with the rematch. Rick Ross raps the second verse, which is immediately followed by Lil Baby rapping the third verse, with both rappers delivering some boastful lyrics.

== Release and promotion ==
On 7 October 2019, KSI told Footasylum, "I'm [going to] be releasing a new single called 'Down Like That' with some big big [sic] features [who] no one is going to [expect]. I'm going to beat Logan and two days [later] I'm going to be filming [the] music video." "Down Like That" was released for digital download and streaming by RBC Records and BMG on 8 November 2019 as the lead single from KSI's upcoming debut studio album. The song stood as KSI's first release through the record label after signing with them in the October of that year. The song's cover art depicts KSI as a cartoon comic book character, flying downwards through a blue sky and white clouds. An audio video was released to KSI's YouTube channel on the same day as the song's release.

Rick Ross (left), S-X (centre) and Lil Baby (right) performing "Down Like That" at KSI vs. Logan Paul II.

On 9 November 2019, "Down Like That" was performed live by Rick Ross, Lil Baby and S-X at the Staples Center in Los Angeles, United States, before the commencement of KSI's boxing rematch against Paul, which KSI went on to win via split decision. The trio performed the song standing inside the boxing ring, while KSI made his entrance and walked towards the ring. Reflecting on the live performance, KSI recalled, "As soon as I heard the track, I was on fire. I was pumped." KSI said, "It [was] sick to have them perform it as my ring walk [music]. It was groundbreaking stuff; historical stuff." He continued, "It was huge. At the time, I was so focused [on the fight] that I didn't really take it in. It was only after the fight that I was like, 'I had Rick Ross and Lil Baby literally performing live!'" Explaining the decision to have the featured artists perform the song at the rematch, KSI said, "I wanted to make a statement and get inside Logan's head." He continued, "I wanted him to realise the scale and the level that I was going [in] at. I wanted him to understand that we're at a different level compared to the last fight and he's not ready. He definitely felt it." KSI and S-X performed "Down Like That" at the beginning of The KSI Show. The pair also performed "Down Like That" at the KISS Haunted House Party 2020, BBC Radio 1's "Out Out! Live", held at the Wembley Arena, London, and numerous festivals including Reading and Leeds Festivals 2021, TRNSMT 2021 and Parklife 2021.

== Critical reception ==
"Down Like That" was met with generally positive reviews from music critics. Many were "shocked" by the song's "impressive lineup" of featured artists. In his review for HotNewHipHop, Mitch Findlay called it a "decent, if not entirely spectacular" track. He wrote that "KSI sounds comfortable on the instrumental". Findlay observed that Rick Ross' verse is "brief and admittedly phoned-in", but said that his "presence and gravitas are statements in themselves". Findlay continued, "Lil Baby fares no better, capable though not exerting himself in the slightest." Anthony Fantano of The Needle Drop found the song "listenable", but similarly acknowledged that "it's just not very groundbreaking [and] not very memorable".

Richard Smirke of Billboard called "Down Like That" a "catchy" and "hard-hitting" track. Mark Savage of BBC News found the song "bone-chilling" and Louise Griffin of Metro called the song "brutal". Writing for Euphoria, Tom Fogden compared "Down Like That" to "a lot of commercial rap coming out of the US" due to its "infectious chorus" and "heavyweight features". Link Up TV's Sam Rasmin praised S-X's "signature vocals" which create an "infectious" chorus. Rasmin proclaimed, "There is no doubt that this [song] will be doing numbers." GRM Daily's Courtney Wynter liked how the four artists "combine their contrasting styles" and noted that "the energetic tone of the track reflects the triumphant mood surrounding [KSI's] win [against Paul]". In their review of "Down Like That", the staff of unCrazed remarked that the song "changes the dynamics of hip-hop by creating a whole new genre of music" and called it "original, inspirational and congenial". They awarded the song a rating of five stars out of five.

== Music videos ==
The music video for "Down Like That" was directed by Nayip Ramos. It was filmed in a warehouse in Los Angeles on 11 November 2019. Speaking about the decision to film the music video after the rematch, KSI said, "It would have been very awkward if I had lost [the fight]. Very very awkward. I don't think [the music video shoot] would have happened if I'm being honest." The day after it was shot, KSI teased the music video's release by posting a photo of the four artists that was taken on the set of the shoot to his social media pages. The music video premiered on KSI's YouTube channel on 22 November 2019 at 16:00 GMT. A behind-the-scenes video of the shoot was released to the channel four days later.

The music video for "Down Like That" places Lil Baby, S-X, Rick Ross and KSI (from left to right) in a dystopian and apocalyptic warehouse, amongst motorcycles, burned out cars, trash can fires and rubble concrete.

The music video opens with a brief message that reads, "On November 9th KSI beat Logan Paul in what was dubbed the biggest event in internet history. Two days later on November 11th he was on set filming his music video. Here is the result." The opening scenes show KSI falling from a dark thunderous sky, before he crashes through a ceiling and lands on rubble concrete. The remainder of the music video's cinematic imagery places the four artists in a dystopian comic book setting, centered in a world full of destruction, amongst motorcycles, burned out cars and glistening, bright-orange trash can fires. The staff of Entertainment Tonight described the setting as "a Mad Max-inspired, apocalyptic warehouse with a dusty, grunge aesthetic". Speaking about the music video, KSI said, "We just wanted it to look cool as hell. Nothing too crazy. But something that people will watch and be like, 'Yeah, this is sick.'" The staff of NME called it a "blockbuster video" and Courtney Wynter of GRM Daily similarly called it a "big set of visuals". An alternative music video, titled "Down Like That (KSI vs Logan Paul 2 Edition)", which uses footage from KSI's boxing rematch against Paul to accompany the audio track, was released to KSI's YouTube channel on 4 December 2019.

== Commercial performance ==
"Down Like That" is considered to mark the beginning of KSI's mainstream success in his career as a recording artist. In the United Kingdom, "Down Like That" debuted at number 18 on the UK Singles Chart, making it the fourth highest-placed new entry of that week. The song peaked at number 10 in its third week of release, becoming KSI's first song to reach the top 10 of the chart. The song also peaked at number three on the UK Hip Hop and R&B Singles Chart in its third week of release. KSI reacted to the song's commercial success in the UK, tweeting, "This just shows how powerful the YouTube community is. I love this community so much. [I've] seen all the posts supporting the song and I can’t thank you all enough. I truly know how powerful this community is. It’s just all about letting the world [and] mainstream know." On 21 February 2020, "Down Like That" was certified silver by the British Phonographic Industry (BPI) for exceeding sales of 200,000 track-equivalent units in the UK, becoming KSI's first release to receive a certification plaque, and it has since been certified gold for exceeding sales of 400,000 units.

In the Republic of Ireland, "Down Like That" debuted at number 32 on the Irish Singles Chart, making it the highest-placed new entry of that week. The song peaked at number 26 in its third week of release. Elsewhere in Europe, "Down Like That" charted at number 37 in Estonia, number 76 in Greece, number 41 in Latvia, and number 87 in Lithuania. The song also placed at number 10 on Billboard's Euro Digital Song Sales chart. In Canada, "Down Like That" charted at number 77 on the Canadian Hot 100, becoming KSI's first song to enter the Canadian music charts. In the United States, the song earned KSI a spot on Billboard's Emerging Artists chart.

== Credits and personnel ==
Credits adapted from Tidal.

- KSI – songwriting, vocals
- Rick Ross – songwriting, vocals
- Lil Baby – songwriting, vocals
- S-X – production, songwriting, vocals
- Byron Trice – songwriting
- Michalis Michael – mixing
- Henkka Niemistö – mastering

== Charts ==
Chart performance for "Down Like That"
Chart (2019)	Peak position
Canada Hot 100 (Billboard)	77
Estonia (Eesti Tipp-40)	37
Euro Digital Song Sales (Billboard)	10
Greece (IFPI)	76
Ireland (IRMA)	26
Latvia (LAIPA)	41
Lithuania (AGATA)	87
New Zealand Hot Singles (RMNZ)	10
Scotland Singles (OCC)	9
UK Singles (OCC)	10
UK Hip Hop/R&B (OCC)	3
UK Indie (OCC)	1

== Certifications ==
Certifications for "Down Like That"
Region	Certification	Certified units/sales
United Kingdom (BPI)	Gold	400,000^{‡}
^{‡} Sales+streaming figures based on certification alone.

== Release history ==
Release dates and formats for "Down Like That"
Region	Date	Format(s)	Label(s)	Ref.
Various	8 November 2019	Digital download; streaming	RBC; BMG	
United Kingdom	22 November 2019	Adult contemporary radio	RBC; BMG	

== See also ==
- KSI vs. Logan Paul II
- List of UK top-ten singles in 2019
- List of UK Independent Singles Chart number ones of 2019
