= List of Whitney episodes =

Whitney is an American television sitcom starring and created by Whitney Cummings for NBC, who also serves as one of the writers and executive producers. The program ran in the United States from September 22, 2011 to March 27, 2013. The series follows Cummings as an opinionated self-employed photographer and her live-in boyfriend of three years as they deal with trying to keep their relationship growing even if they're not married, with help from their friends.

During the course of the series, 38 episodes of Whitney aired over two seasons.

== Series overview ==
Season	Episodes	Originally released		Viewers (millions)	Rank
Season	Episodes	First released	Last released	Viewers (millions)	Rank
1	22	September 22, 2011	March 28, 2012	5.11	#122
2	16	November 14, 2012	March 27, 2013	4.19	#115

== Episodes ==
=== Season 1 (2011–12) ===
No. overall	No. in season	Title	Directed by	Written by	Original release date	Prod. code	US viewers (millions)
1	1	"Pilot" "Spicing Things Up"	Andy Ackerman	Whitney Cummings	September 22, 2011	101	6.84
Whitney's plan to spice things up with Alex results in a trip to the emergency room.
2	2	"First Date"	Andy Ackerman	Whitney Cummings	September 29, 2011	102	5.40
When Whitney realizes that she and Alex have never gone on an official first date, she comes up with an unusual idea to recreate the past.
3	3	"Silent Treatment"	Andy Ackerman	Danielle Sanchez-Witzel	October 6, 2011	103	4.89
Whitney gives Alex the silent treatment, much to his secret delight. Roxanne posts photos online of a party that never happened.
4	4	"A Decent Proposal"	Andy Ackerman	John Quaintance	October 13, 2011	106	4.25
Lily is on edge with anticipation that Neal might propose, while Whitney and Alex compete to see who can be more romantic.
5	5	"The Wire"	John Fortenberry	Ethan Sandler	October 27, 2011	105	4.19
Whitney and Mark conspire to catch Alex's condescending tone of voice by setting up cameras around the apartment. Alex and his brother (Ken Marino), come to blows.
6	6	"Two Broke-Up Guys"	Andy Ackerman	Mathew Harawitz	November 3, 2011	107	4.31
When Alex encourages Mark to recycle his beer can, Mark's firm stance against it causes a bro-mance break up. Whitney discovers the real root of Mark's heartbreak.
7	7	"Getting to Know You"	Henry Chan	Adrian Wenner	November 10, 2011	104	4.28
When Whitney discovers Alex has given up some of his interests since dating her, she is determined to share them with him. Lily tries to embrace Neal's Indian heritage in order to win over his mother.
8	8	"Clarence!"	Mark Cendrowski	Sam Sklaver	November 17, 2011	108	3.97
When Alex's childhood dog passes away, Whitney suggests they adopt a dog together. Unfortunately the pound worker (Lisa Lampanelli) takes a disliking to them. Roxanne asks Neal for financial advice.
9	9	"Up All Night"	Andy Ackerman	Whitney Cummings & John Quaintance	December 1, 2011	109	3.93
Whitney fear of being Lily's maid of honor facilitates a visit to a therapist (Chelsea Handler). Mark reconnects with his ex at Lily's engagement party.
10	10	"Christmas is Cummings"	Andy Ackerman	John Quaintance	December 8, 2011	110	4.08
Whitney and Alex plan to spend the holidays with friends instead of families, but their plans are derailed by Whitney's parents' (Jane Kaczmarek and Peter Gallagher) surprise visit.
11	11	"Private Parts"	Andy Ackerman	Mathew Harawitz	January 11, 2012	111	5.79
After a trust breakdown, Whitney takes some solo time. She returns home to discover Alex in a compromising position.
12	12	"Faking It"	Fred Savage	Theresa Mulligan Rosenthal	January 18, 2012	112	4.15
Whitney fakes being interested in Lily's wedding plans. Alex pretends to be young and hip to reboot his Internet career. Roxanne and Mark donate blood.
13	13	"Codependence Day"	Andy Ackerman	Ethan Sandler & Dan Levy	January 25, 2012	113	4.40
Roxanne hires Whitney as her office assistant to spy on her work nemesis (Kathy Griffin). While Alex reorganizes the apartment, Mark approaches Neal and Lily for relationship advice.
14	14	"Mind Games"	Linda Mendoza	Betsy Thomas & Adrian Wenner	February 1, 2012	114	4.33
Whitney and Alex visit a couples therapist (John Cleese) to improve their communication and intimacy. Lily and Neal host Mark and Roxanne for a game night.
15	15	"Lance!"	Andy Ackerman	Sam Sklaver	February 8, 2012	115	4.06
Whitney goes on the offensive when she learns Roxanne has reunited with her ex-husband (Hayes MacArthur). Lily tries to hide from Neal that she lost her engagement ring.
16	16	"48 Hours"	David Trainer	John Quaintance	February 15, 2012	116	4.48
Mark shares a theory on the rules of dating causing Whitney and Alex to flashback on how they met.
17	17	"Mad Women"	Betsy Thomas	Whitney Cummings	February 22, 2012	117	4.11
Whitney tries out a bust-enhancing bra. Alex embraces his inner Don Draper. Roxanne goes to Mark for advice. Lily and Neal discuss a prenup.
18	18	"Homeland Security"	Andy Ackerman	Adrian Wenner	February 29, 2012	118	4.13
Whitney has a surprising reaction when she and Alex are mugged. Lily and Neal come to a crossroads in their relationship.
19	19	"The Ex Box"	Andy Ackerman	Zachary Rosenblatt	March 7, 2012	119	4.23
Whitney's curiosity is piqued when she finds a box of items from Alex's ex-girlfriend (June Diane Raphael). Lily tries to be Roxanne's perfect roommate, to devastating effect.
20	20	"G-Word"	Andy Ackerman	Mathew Harawitz	March 14, 2012	120	3.91
When Neal begins to question his sexuality, Whitney and Alex help him discover his true self. Lily considers dating again.
21	21	"Something Old, Something New" (Part 1)	Andy Ackerman	Kirk J. Rudell	March 21, 2012	121	4.18
After a wild night out, Alex drunkenly proposes to Whitney. Mark realizes he may have romantic feelings for Roxanne. Lily and Neal try to adjust to their new relationship. (Part 1 of 2)
22	22	"Something Black, Something Blue" (Part 2)	Betsy Thomas	Whitney Cummings	March 28, 2012	122	4.09
Whitney seeks help from her father (Peter Gallagher) after running into complications trying to obtain a marriage license. While trying to get Roxanne interested in him, Mark instead stirs up Lily's interest. (Part 2 of 2)

1. The first episode was available via NBC.com/NBC On-Demand on September 15. The second was available via Yahoo! on September 27.

=== Season 2 (2012–13) ===
No. overall	No. in season	Title	Directed by	Written by	Original release date	Prod. code	US viewers (millions)
23	1	"Bawl and Chain"	Andy Ackerman	Eric Zicklin	November 14, 2012	201	4.22
Whitney and Alex discover that being married isn't all it's cracked up to be (even though they're not really married). Lily and Roxanne have trouble choosing a wedding gift for Whitney.
24	2	"Poor Whitney"	Andy Ackerman	Liz Astrof	November 21, 2012	202	3.94
After Whitney and Alex open a joint bank account, Whitney struggles with a ridiculously frugal lifestyle. Mark quits the police force and buys a bar.
25	3	"Sex, Lies, and Alibis"	Steve Zuckerman	Wil Calhoun & Liz Astrof	December 5, 2012	203	3.92
Whitney and Alex decide to come clean on all of the white lies they have told each other, but they end up getting more than they bargained for. Mark hires a new bartender.
26	4	"Hello Giggles"	Andy Ackerman	Dan Levy	December 12, 2012	204	3.77
When Alex suffers an unfortunate mishap during a public speaking engagement, Whitney can't contain her laughter.
27	5	"Three's Company"	David Trainer	Neil Casey	January 2, 2013	205	4.96
When Alex's ex-girlfriend (June Diane Raphael) comes to town for a weekend visit, Whitney struggles to cope. Roxanne is forced to stay overnight at Mark's while Lily has a date at Roxanne's apartment.
28	6	"Two Broke Hearts"	Andy Ackerman	Owen H.M. Smith	January 9, 2013	206	4.11
Whitney sees a doctor about her irregular heartbeat. Lily introduces her annoying new boyfriend (John Ross Bowie) to the gang.
29	7	"Sorry!"	Andy Ackerman	Whitney Cummings & Linda Wallem	January 30, 2013	207	3.64
Although Alex warns Whitney to stay away after she is contacted by a rotten ex-boyfriend (Lance Barber) looking to make amends, Lily tries to convince Whitney otherwise. Mark shows Roxanne that he knows her better than she knows herself.
30	8	"Space Invaders"	Andy Ackerman	Zachary Rosenblatt	February 6, 2013	208	3.56
After Alex lies to Whitney to get some quality alone time, the two attend couples therapy sessions with Dr. Grant (John Cleese). Lily gets jealous because RJ's niece prefers Roxanne.
31	9	"Snapped"	Andy Ackerman	Liz Astrof	February 13, 2013	209	3.59
When Alex's annoying brother (Ken Marino) stops by for an afternoon visit, Whitney has trouble holding her tongue.
32	10	"Breaking Dad"	Andy Ackerman	Theresa Mulligan Rosenthal	February 20, 2013	210	3.14
Whitney's father (Peter Gallagher) returns to town a changed man...maybe. Whitney gifts Lily $5,000, then has to ask for it back.
33	11	"Slow Ride"	Linda Mendoza	Eric Zicklin	February 27, 2013	211	3.41
Alex buys a motorcycle against Whitney's wishes. Lily tries to seize control of Mark's bar.
34	12	"Lost in Transition"	Andy Ackerman	Debby Wolfe	March 6, 2013	212	3.83
Whitney's half-sister (Natasha Leggero) visits to deliver some big news. Alex and Mark help RJ get over a devastating break up.
35	13	"Nesting"	Andy Ackerman	Theresa Mulligan Rosenthal	March 13, 2013	213	3.38
During Whitney and Alex's honeymoon getaway they get an unexpected visit from Alex's dad.
36	14	"Crazy, Stupid, Words"	Andy Ackerman	Zachary Rosenblatt & Eric Zicklin	March 20, 2013	214	3.13
After Whitney takes a joke too far, she and Alex engage in a hurtful war of words.
37	15	"Alex, Meet Lily"	Andy Ackerman	Megan Hearne	March 27, 2013	215	2.92
Whitney suggests Alex become Lily's man-friend. Alex arranges a blind date for Lily with a needy pal (Paul Scheer).
38	16	"Cake, Cake, Cake"	Andy Ackerman	Whitney Cummings & Dan Levy	March 27, 2013	216	2.88
In the series finale, Whitney catches her therapist (Chelsea Handler) eating an entire cake in the park and begins to question everything.
