= Dangerous (S-X song) =

2020 song by S-X

Single by S-X
- Released: 18 September 2020
- Length: 3:20
- Label: RBC; BMG
- Songwriters: Sam Gumbley; Yoshiya Ady; David Manzoor; Mams Taylor
- Producers: S-X; Yoshi; King David

S-X singles chronology
"Neither Would I" (2020)	"Dangerous" (2020)	"In Real Life" (2020)

Music video
- "Dangerous" on YouTube

"Dangerous" is a song by British singer-songwriter and record producer S-X from his fourth mixtape, A Repeat Wouldn't Go a Miss (2021). The song was written by S-X alongside Yoshi, King David and Mams Taylor, with the former three handling the song's production. It was released for digital download and streaming by Universal Music Group on 18 September 2020 as the second single from the mixtape. An accompanying music video was released on the same day. The song debuted at number 31 on both the UK Singles Downloads Chart and the Scottish Singles Chart.

== Release and promotion ==
On 15 March 2020, S-X tweeted, "My next song is called 'dangerous'". On 5 September 2020, S-X revealed the song's cover art and release date and the song was made available to pre-order on digital download services and pre-save on streaming services. "Dangerous" was released for digital download and streaming by Eterno Music and Universal on 18 September 2020. It was S-X's first release through the record label after signing with them in May 2020. S-X appeared on both the CBBC television show The Playlist and the Sky One television show Soccer AM to promote the song.

== Critical reception ==
GRM Daily wrote, "[S-X] showcases his faultless vocals over a melodic and instantaneous beat and it's safe to say that his first release in over 8 months is a certified hit." Sam Rasmin of Creative Generation UK wrote, "S-X has delivered yet another incredible vocal performance, which matched with a gripping instrumental, makes for an exciting new release." Rock 'N' Load Magazine wrote, "S-X is leading us out of summer with an undeniable track, which is set to be a hit." 1883 Magazine acclaimed that "S-X more than proven himself as a confident and powerful artist".

== Music video ==
The music video for "Dangerous" premiered on S-X's YouTube channel on 18 September 2020. The video was co-directed by Troy Roscoe and Danyl Goodall. 1883 Magazine wrote, "In the music video, S-X finds himself in a multi-dimensional world of haunted mansions with a witchy-like cult, a dinner gathering full of deranged guests, and a spider that looks eerily familiar to S-X. With a Stranger Things-esque theme throughout the music video, it's clear that the inspiration behind 'Dangerous' is the danger that comes when you entangle love with deceit." The video features a cameo appearance from British YouTuber and rapper KSI. A behind-the-scenes video of the music video shoot was released to S-X's YouTube channel on 29 September 2020.

== Credits and personnel ==
Credits adapted from Tidal.

- S-X – production, songwriting, vocals
- Yoshi – production, songwriting
- King David – production, songwriting
- Mams Taylor – songwriting
- Michalis Michael – mixing
- Henkka Niemistö – mastering

== Charts ==
Chart performance for "Dangerous"
Chart (2020)	Peak position
Scotland Singles (OCC)	31
UK Singles Downloads (OCC)	31
UK Indie (OCC)	20

== Release history ==
Release dates and formats for "Dangerous"
Region	Date	Format(s)	Version	Label(s)	Ref.
Various	18 September 2020	Digital download; streaming	Original	Eterno Music; Universal	
Various	21 September 2021	Digital download; streaming	Slowed and reverb	RBC; BMG	
