= All Night (Lynsey de Paul song) =

1973 song by Lynsey de Paul

Single by Lynsey de Paul
- B-side: "Blind Leading the Blind"
- Released: April 27, 1973
- Genre: Pop
- Length: 3:00
- Label: MAM
- Songwriters: Lynsey de Paul; Ron Roker

"All Night" is a song written by Lynsey de Paul and Ron Roker. De Paul released her version of the song on 27 April 1973 as her third single released on MAM Records, with arrangements by Martyn Ford and John Bell and produced by de Paul. The song is listed in the U.S. Library of Congress Catalog of Copyright Entries and in "The Directory of American 45 R.p.m. Records". It features an uncredited male vocal (repeating the title "All Night" after de Paul sings it). A slinky, sexy song, it compares a love relationship to that of the spider and a fly. The single is backed by the more socially aware song "Blind Leading the Blind", composed and produced by de Paul. The song was an unusual release since neither the A-side or the B-side featured as tracks on her debut album. Surprise had been released a little more than a month earlier - presumably it was not included since "All Night" has a very different style than the tracks on Surprise.

As well as being released in the UK, it was issued in France, Germany, Netherlands, Belgium, Portugal, Sweden, Turkey, New Zealand, Japan and the US. Cashbox reviewed the single and wrote "Lynsey's initial Stateside release, "Sugar Me" received wide industry acclaim, and this one is certain to follow in same path. Excellent single for major top 40 programmers is melodic and rhythmic. This will be the one to watch". It was listed as a "Spins & Sales" pick in Record World and also as a "discopick" in DJ and Radio Monthly magazine. In his column "Pop Picking" journalist James Craven wrote "Lynsey de Paul should be chart bound soon with her "All Night". I must admit it took one or two plays before coming to this conclusion. It builds up from a quiet start but I must confess Lynsey knows how to handle a lyric." Record Mirror reviewed the single "Noted composer, singer, pianist, producer, arranger, talent scout Lynsey does have style you know. She's got a feel for the right approach in pop, and there is an element of sauciness about her songs which come over well. This one is a persuasive, intriguing sort of performance which registers instantly. Nice one - chart cert". A week later the music paper listed the single as one of Hamilton's Disco Picks and wrote "She "Gets Down" quite sexily, MoR/Pop." Writing in the music newspaper Sounds, English DJ John Peel wrote "a dapper little strutter" about the song.

== Radio and TV performances ==
As well as garnering radio plays on BBC Radio, Radio Luxembourg and pirate radio stations, the song was also play listed on Italian radio stations such as "Secondo" (channel 2) and it was playlist by various Canadian radio stations. De Paul appeared on numerous prime time TV shows performing "All Night" such as Top of the Pops in the UK on 4 May 1973 and Hey Brian! on ITV. She performed a version of the song together with her song "Sleeping Blue Nights" (from the album Surprise) on the German TV music show Hits-a-Go-Go on 24 June 1973 (re-screened as an episode of Einsfestival on 28 March 2015), where she performed with Mott The Hoople. De Paul also gave a performance surrounded by male dancers on Top A Gérard Lenorman in France and Popzein in the Netherlands, alongside ABBA on 6 June 1973 performing the song. The Top of the Pops version was released on the BBC Transcription Services for broadcast world wide, together with live versions of her songs "Ivory Tower" and "Water".

== Singles charts ==
The single reached No. 17 on the Dutch Single Tip chart and No. 20 on the Turkish singles chart as published by Milliyet. It was also playlist by a number of pirate radio stations and it reached No. 27 on the Radio North Sea International (RNI) Top 30 in June 1973, Although it did not appear in the UK Singles Chart, it bubbled under as a chart breaker. In 1974, it was released for a second time in Japan, as one of the tracks on a four track EP that featured all four de Paul singles recorded for the MAM label.

== Album track ==
Even though it was originally a non-album single, it has since been released on almost every de Paul compilation album, such as Lynsey Sings aka The World of Lynsey De Paul, and the German album Profile. A version that is longer than the one appearing as the single and that referenced "Sugar Me" was released on the album Greatest Hits, and in remastered form on Sugar and Beyond. In the accompanying booklet to Sugar and Beyond, de Paul revealed it was not one of her own favourite compositions. Nevertheless, AllMusic lists "All Night" as one of de Paul's song highlights.

== Cover version ==
The song was recorded with Japanese lyrics by singer/actress Jun Fubuki (real name Reiko Horikawa) as "Futari No Hodou", which was released as a single as well as an album track on the L.P. "ジュンとあなたの世界〜風吹じゅん ファースト・アルバム〜" in Japan in 1974. It was later released for the first time on the CD collection Golden Best: Jun Fubuki in 2012. Fubuki performed her version of the song on the popular Japanese TV show, 風吹ジュン - 二人の舗道, in 1975.

== Recent releases ==
In 2019, it was included as a track on Denim & Diamante vol. 1, a selection of 1970s glam pop and discotheque rock, mixed by Denim Disco. In 2020, it comprised one of the tracks on I Start Counting #10, an album compiled by Saint Etienne. The song was also included in the 2024 collection "Rose Coloured Glasses". It still receives airplay, notably in the US as recently as 2021.
