= All Night Long =

All Night Long may refer to:

== Film, TV and theatre ==
=== Film ===
- All Night Long (1924 film), an American silent short film featuring Harry Langdon
- All Night Long (1962 film), a British film directed by Basil Dearden
- All Night Long (1981 film), a comedy film starring Barbra Streisand and Gene Hackman
- All Night Long (1989 film), a Hong Kong film of 1989
- All Night Long (1992 film), a Japanese film featuring Ryōka Yuzuki
- All Night Long (1995 film), a Hong Kong film produced by Golden Harvest

=== Television ===
- All Night Long (TV series), a British sitcom
- "All Night Long", an episode of the anime Black Heaven

=== Theatre ===
- All Night Long, a 1984 play by John O'Keefe that featured Alyssa Milano in its original Off-Broadway production

== Music ==
=== Albums ===
- All Night Long (Buckcherry album) or the title song 2010
- All Night Long (Junior Kimbrough album) or the title song, 1992
- All Night Long (Kenny Burrell album) or the title song, 1956
- All Night Long (Sammy Hagar album), 1978
- All Night Long (Shirley Horn album), 1981
- All Night Long: An Introduction, by Rainbow, 2002
- All Night Long: Live in Dallas, by Joe Walsh, 2013
- All Night Long, by Billy Burnette, 1999

=== Songs ===
- “All Night Long” (Alexandra Burke song)
- “All Night Long” (Ami Suzuki song)
- “All Night Long” (Blazin' Squad song)
- “All Night Long” (Common song)
- "All Night Long" (Faith Evans song)
- "All Night Long" (Joe Walsh song)
- “All Night Long” (Joel Turner song)
- “All Night Long” (Mary Jane Girls song)
- "All Night Long" (Rainbow song)
- “All Night Long” (Simon Mathew song), the Danish entry in the Eurovision Song Contest 2008
- “All Night Long (All Night)”, by Lionel Richie
- “Mary Jane (All Night Long)”, by Mary J. Blige
- “Touch Me (All Night Long)”, by Cathy Dennis
- "All Night Long", by Aretha Franklin from Aretha: With The Ray Bryant Combo
- "All Night Long", by Billy Squier from Signs of Life
- "All Night Long", by Brownsville Station from Yeah!
- "All Night Long", by Demi Lovato from Unbroken
- "All Night Long", by Diddy from Press Play
- "All Night Long", by Eve
- "All Night Long", by Jonas Blue and RetroVision
- "All Night Long", by Lasgo from Far Away
- "All Night Long", by Little Richard from The Fabulous Little Richard
- "All Night Long", by LMFAO from Sorry for Party Rocking
- "All Night Long", by Montgomery Gentry and Charlie Daniels from Tattoos & Scars (1999)
- "All Night Long", by Nate Dogg from Nate Dogg
- "All Night Long", by Paul Revere & The Raiders
- "All Night Long", by Peter Murphy from Love Hysteria
- "All Night Long", by Scorpions from Tokyo Tapes
- "All Night Long", by the Verve, B-side of the single “Rather Be”

== See also ==
- "You Shook Me All Night Long", a song by AC/DC
- Duet All Night Long, a split EP by Reel Big Fish and Zolof the Rock & Roll Destroyer
- All Night Wrong, a 2002 album by Allan Holdsworth
- "All Nightmare Long", a song by Metallica
- "All Right Now", a song by Free, misheard as "All Night Long"
