= S-X =

British singer-songwriter and producer

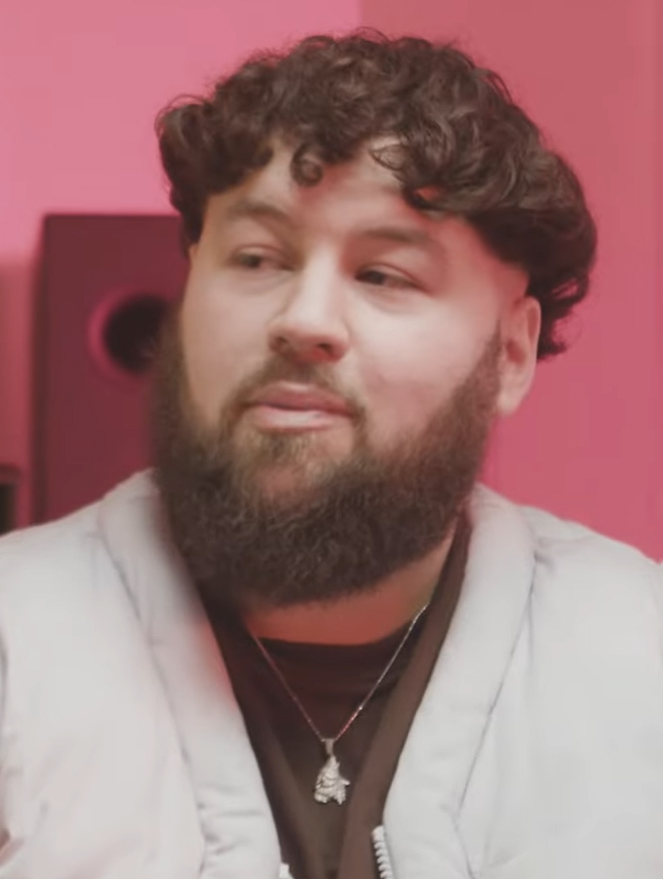
- Gumbley in 2022

Background information
- Born: Samuel Andrew Gumbley; 4 August 1992 (age 34); Wolverhampton, England
- Genres: R&B; trap; electronic
- Occupations: Singer; songwriter; record producer
- Instrument: Digital audio workstation
- Years active: 2010–present
- Labels: RBC; BMG; Universal (former); Atlantic (former)

Samuel Andrew Gumbley (born 4 August 1992), known professionally as S-X, is a British singer, songwriter, record producer and businessman. As a record producer, Gumbley has worked with high-profile artists such as Chance the Rapper, Childish Gambino, Future, Lil Wayne, Meek Mill, and Nicki Minaj. He was Grammy-nominated for his work on Childish Gambino's album Because the Internet (2013).

Gumbley gained mainstream popularity as a singer-songwriter when he featured on (and produced) KSI's 2019 single "Down Like That", alongside Rick Ross and Lil Baby. The song peaked at number 10 on the UK Singles Chart, and it was certified silver by the British Phonographic Industry (BPI) for exceeding sales of 200,000 units in the UK. Gumbley has since released the singles "Neither Would I", "Dangerous" and "Feels So Good".

== Early life ==
Samuel Andrew Gumbley was born on 4 August 1992 in Wolverhampton, England. When he was in Year 7, Gumbley began playing the saxophone and harmonica and producing music in FL Studio. He attended Smestow School in Wolverhampton, before studying music production at the City of Wolverhampton College, where he attended the same class as Liam Payne.

== Music career ==
=== 2010–2019: Early beginnings and True Colours ===
Aged 15, Gumbley produced the instrumental "Woo Riddim", which two years later became a popular grime instrumental after being used by British MC D Double E for his 2010 song "Bad 2 Tha Bone". S-X was signed to Atlantic Records during his time working as a record producer. In 2013 he was featured in an All Trap Music megamix, showing his talent as a trap beatmaker.

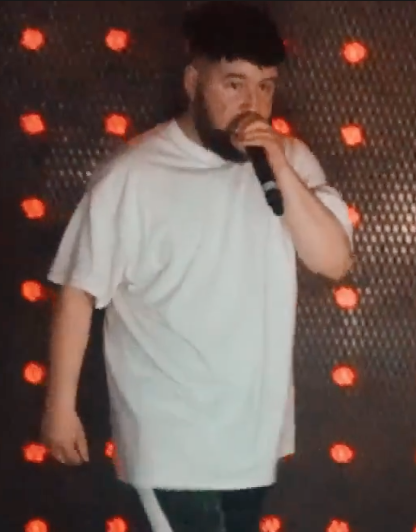
Gumbley performing in 2018

In early 2017, Gumbley began to use his own vocals over his beats, establishing himself as a singer-songwriter as well as just a producer.

In 2018, Gumbley was the opening act for British singer-songwriter Lily Allen throughout the North American and European leg of her No Shame Tour.

On 4 July 2019, Gumbley released "Always Wrong" as the first single from his mixtape True Colours.

=== 2019–present: New record label and Things Change ===
On 8 November 2019, British YouTuber and rapper KSI released "Down Like That", which features Gumbley alongside American rappers Rick Ross and Lil Baby, with Gumbley also handling the song's production. The song peaked at number 10 on the UK Singles Chart, becoming Gumbley's first song to impact the UK charts and his highest-charting single in the UK to date. In February 2020, the song received a silver certification from the British Phonographic Industry (BPI) for exceeding sales of 200,000 units in the UK. The song also charted at number 77 on the Billboard Canadian Hot 100.

On 10 January 2020, Gumbley released a single titled "Neither Would I". In May, Gumbley signed with Universal Music Group and Eterno Music after attracting interest from several major record labels. On 18 September 2020, Gumbley released a single titled "Dangerous".

In May 2021, Gumbley departed from Universal Music Group and Eterno Music and signed with RBC Records and BMG. He released his first single through the record label, "Feels So Good", on 28 May. On 13 August, Gumbley released his final mixtape, titled A Repeat Wouldn't Go A Miss.

In October, Gumbley released a single titled "Who We Are", which was the first single for his debut album, which was released in 2023. In January 2023, Gumbley released "All Night," which featured vocals from Trippie Redd. In May, Gumbley released the second single titled "Locked Out", which featured vocals from KSI. The song peaked at number 53 on the UK Singles Chart. Gumbley's debut studio album, titled Things Change, was released on 19 July 2022.

== Other ventures ==
=== Television appearances ===
In 2020, Gumbley appeared in three episodes of Sky One's Soccer AM. Gumbley also starred alongside KSI as cast members of the second series of Channel 4's Celebrity Gogglebox.

=== Boxing match with DTG ===
On 18 September 2023, it was announced that Gumbley would make his boxing debut on the preliminary card of MF & DAZN: X Series 10 – The Prime Card against English rapper DTG. The bout was scheduled for 14 October at Manchester Arena in Manchester. On the night of the fight, Gumbley was defeated by DTG via 1st round technical knockout.

=== Meltdown Cookies ===
On 1st November 2025, Gumbley launched his bakery venture, Meltdown Cookies. In his hometown, Wolverhampton.

== Personal life ==
Gumbley is an avid supporter of Wolverhampton Wanderers F.C. Since 2019, he has been an ambassador of the club's foundation, called the "Wolves Foundation."

== Discography ==
Studio albums

- Things Change (2022)
- Anywhere But Here (2023)

Mixtapes

- Reasons (2018)
- Temporary (2018)
- True Colours (2019)
- A Repeat Wouldn't Go A Miss (2021)

== Filmography ==
Film
Year	Title	Role	Notes	Ref.
2023	KSI: In Real Life	Himself	Documentary	

Television
Year	Title	Network	Notes	Ref.
2020–2021	Soccer AM	Sky One	3 episodes	
2020	BBC Breakfast	BBC One	1 episode	
2020–2021	Celebrity Gogglebox	Channel 4	Series 2 (episodes 1–4) Series 3 (episodes 6–8)	
2020	The Playlist	CBBC	Series 4; episode 25	
2022	Blue Peter	CBBC	Episode dated 8 July 2022	

Music videos
Year	Title	Artist(s)	Role	Ref.
2020	"Going Clear"	Randolph	Himself	
2020	"Lighter"	Nathan Dawe feat. KSI	Himself	

== MF–Professional boxing record ==
1 fight	0 wins	1 loss
By knockout	0	1

No.	Result	Record	Opponent	Type	Round, time	Date	Location	Notes
1	Loss	0–1	DTG	TKO	1 (3), 1:59	14 Oct 2023	Manchester Arena, Manchester, England	
