= Neither Would I =

2020 song by S-X

Single by S-X

from the album A Repeat Wouldn't Go a Miss
- Released: 10 January 2020
- Length: 3:03
- Label: RBC; BMG
- Songwriter: Sam Gumbley
- Producer: S-X

S-X singles chronology
"Down Like That" (2019)	"Neither Would I" (2020)	"Dangerous" (2020)

Music video
- "Neither Would I" on YouTube

"Neither Would I" (stylized in all lowercase) is a song by British singer-songwriter and record producer S-X from his fourth mixtape, A Repeat Wouldn't Go a Miss (2021). The song was solely written and produced by S-X. It was independently released for digital download and streaming on 10 January 2020 as the lead single from the mixtape. An accompanying music video was released the day before the song's release. The song debuted at number 45 on the UK Singles Downloads Chart and number 53 on the Scottish Singles Chart.

== Music and lyrics ==
"Neither Would I" attains a "powerful yet futuristic-sounding instrumental". Lyrically, S-X "touches on a story between himself and one of his counterparts". The song has been described as "an anthem for those who have experienced loss".

== Release and promotion ==
On 29 December 2019, S-X teased the upcoming release of the song by tweeting the words, "neither would i". On 3 January 2020, S-X revealed the song's title, cover art and release date and the song was made available to pre-order on digital download services and pre-save on streaming services. On 4 January 2020, S-X performed "Neither Would I" on the Sky One television show Soccer AM, six days prior to its release. "Neither Would I" was independently released for digital download and streaming on 10 January 2020.

== Critical reception ==
"Neither Would I"
A 27-second sample of the chorus, performed by S-X.

Jack Lynch of GRM Daily praised that "S-X layers his harmonies and melodic style well". He continued, "S-X’s vocal range is emphasised on the high-pitched hook as a flawless and flexible one, as he touches both ends of the spectrum throughout the tune." Kaitlin Milligan of BroadwayWorld wrote, "With S-X lending his soaring vocals, 'Neither Would I' is a heartfelt track that skilfully pairs electronic elements with organic instrumentation... as [S-X] pours over a failed relationship." Sam Rasmin of Creative Generation UK wrote, "The multi-talented creative continues to showcase his endless amounts of musical ability. The production stands strong and grips you from the get go, before he then laces the beat with yet another flawless vocal performance. Creating a vibe which is very much in line with his extensive back catalogue of music, it is clear to see that S-X has found a winning formula." Rasmin proclaimed that "there is no doubt that this [song] will be doing crazy numbers".

Writing for Clash, Ramy Abou-Setta praised that "the production meshed with the thumping vocal delivery build an anthem that leaves the listener in a euphoric state". She continued, "The production is stripped to the bare bones, with subtle hints of synth, a booming 808, and percussion dancing in the background of S-X’s strong vocal delivery – in fact, you could be forgiven for wondering if this was an instrumental to begin with. S-X’s vocal range and versatility in this song is the cherry on top, an exceptional song in his repertoire, and in my personal opinion one of his best."

== Music video ==
The music video for "Neither Would I" was released to S-X's YouTube channel on 9 January 2020. The video was directed by Troy Roscoe and Danyl Goodall. It was filmed in Marrakesh, Morocco. Speaking about the music video, S-X explained: "I wanted to shoot the video in Morocco, Marrakech to be precise, because I feel that the city visually and energetically captures the meaning of the song perfectly. It's a place full of love and nice people, yet it has many broken and run down parts. Underneath it all, there is always a sense of unity."

== Credits and personnel ==
Credits adapted from Tidal.

- S-X – production, songwriting, vocals
- Michalis Michael – mixing
- Henkka Niemistö – mastering

== Charts ==
Chart performance for "Neither Would I"
Chart (2020)	Peak position
Scotland Singles (OCC)	53
UK Singles Downloads (OCC)	45
UK Indie (OCC)	42

== Release history ==
Release dates and formats for "Neither Would I"
Region	Date	Format(s)	Version	Label(s)	Ref.
Various	10 January 2020	Digital download; streaming	Original	Self-released	
Various	21 September 2021	Digital download; streaming	Slowed and reverb	RBC; BMG	
