= Gogglebox Ireland =

Irish reality television series

- Genre: Reality television
- Narrated by: Deirdre O'Kane; Rory Cowan
- Theme music composer: Kodaline – "Perfect World" & "Brand New Day"
- Country of origin: Ireland
- Original language: English
- No. of series: 11
- No. of episodes: 125

Production
- Executive producers: Stephen Lambert; Darren Smith
- Producer: David Noble
- Camera setup: Dual cameras
- Running time: 60 minutes (inc. adverts)
- Production company: Kite Entertainment

Original release
- Network: Virgin Media One
- Release: 22 September 2016 – present

Gogglebox Ireland is an Irish reality show, broadcast on Virgin Media One from 22 September 2016 onwards and a co-production between Kite Entertainment in Dublin and Studio Lambert in London. The series is based on the original UK version and features 15 groups of families and friends from around Ireland who react to Irish, British and American television shows broadcast in Ireland. As well as RTÉ, Virgin Media Television and TG4, British channels BBC One, BBC Two and Channel 4 are also available to ROI viewers so these are included in the programmes reviewed along with some broadcast on satellite channels such as Sky Showcase, TLC and MTV.

== History ==
The show, which follows 15 groups of families and friends from Ireland, is part of the international Gogglebox franchise. It was ordered in early 2016 and premiered on TV3 airing fourteen episodes from Thursday 22 September 2016 until 29 December 2016 in series 1 and returning on Wednesday 8 February 2017 with series 2 which ended with a highlights episode subtitled 'Best Bits' on Wednesday 3 May 2017. Series three began on Wednesday 13 September 2017—with repeats on Saturday nights at 10.30pm—and ended on Wednesday 22 November.

The series broke new ground in the final episode of Series 1 when it featured cast's children and additional family members joining them to review the biggest TV show of the year in Ireland The Late Late Toy Show.

Following strong ratings, the series was renewed for a second series on 20 November 2016, which began broadcasting on 8 February 2017, consisting of twelve episodes and a highlights show. Series 2 saw the introduction of five new house holds from all around the country; Lauara and Aisling (Greystones), Tadgh and Ettie (County Clare), Shelly and John (Ballina), Dawn and Dale (Cork) and The Moran Family (Portlaoise)

Series 3 introduced two new households from Dublin City Centre (Couple Siobhán and Pat) and the Cooley Peninsula (Friends Michael, David and Gerry.) Jamie welcomed baby Cobey to the Cabra household while, in Navan, Loretta gave birth to baby Asha in early November.

In the final episode of Series 3, the cast of Daddy's Home 2—Mel Gibson, John Lithgow, Will Ferrell and Mark Wahlberg—featured as a guest 'family' on the show and reviewed 'Ireland's Fittest Family', 'Fair City' and 'Stetsons and Stilettos.'

On 23 August 2018, it was announced that Gogglebox Ireland would return for a fourth series. The series returned to Virgin Media One on 5 September 2018.

== Episodes ==
Series overview
Series	Episodes	First released	Last released
1	14	22 September 2016	29 December 2016
2	13	8 February 2017	3 May 2017
3	12	13 September 2017	29 November 2017
4	13	5 September 2018	17 July 2019
5	10	11 September 2019	23 February 2020
6	12	9 September 2020	24 February 2021
7	12	1 September 2021	26 January 2022
8	12	31 August 2022	11 January 2023
9	12	6 September 2023	17 January 2024
10	10	4 September 2024	6 November 2024
11	12	10 September 2025	26 November 2025
12	12	9 September 2026	

=== Series 1 (2016) ===
No. overall	No. in series	Original release date
1	1	22 September 2016
America's Got Talent, RTÉ News and Sport, Ingenious Animals, All-Ireland Football Final, Anchorman: The Legend of Ron Burgundy, Prime Time, Duets at the BBC, Smalltown, Tipping Point
2	2	29 September 2016
The X Factor, Ploughing Championships Live, Celebrity Island with Bear Grylls, Trump v. Clinton, Strictly Come Dancing, Inside Trinity, 50 Ways To Kill Your Mammies, Braveheart
3	3	6 October 2016
The Late Late Show, Sky News, Animal Babies, RTÉ News and Sport: All Ireland, Livin' With Lucy, Find Me A Home, Sir Terry Wogan Remembered, 1000 Heartbeats
4	4	13 October 2016
Winning Streak, Britain's Secrets with Anne Robinson, True North: My Wig & Me, The Lie Detective, The Fall, Kevin McGahan's America, Catchphrase, Angela's Ashes, The Ray D'Arcy Show
5	5	20 October 2016
The Graham Norton Show, RTÉ News and Sport, TOTP Big Hits, SAS: Who Dares Wins, The Ray D'Arcy Show, Long Lost Family, The Chase, Pulp Fiction
6	6	27 October 2016
Sister Act, The School That Got Teens Reading, Emmerdale, Penn & Teller: Fool Us, First Dates, Married At First Sight, Stand Up to Cancer, The Late Late Show
7	7	3 November 2016
RTÉ Weather/Today with Maura and Daithi, A Question of Sport, Strictly Come Dancing, How to Build a Human, Ireland's Fittest Family, Storyville: Chasing Asylum - Inside Australia's Detention Camps, My Granny The Escort, Nightmare On Elm Street
8	8	10 November 2016
Planet Earth 2, TV3: The 5.30 News, Grandma's Boy: Donal Skehan, The Jonathan Ross Show, Naked Attraction, The Airport Up In Knock, Trainspotting, The Waltons
9	9	17 November 2016
Stetsons and Stilettos, TV3: Sunday AM, Body Fixers, Hector Central, Today with Maura and Daithi, Ferris Bueller's Day Off, The Late Late Show, Country Music Awards: Sky Arts
10	10	24 November 2016
Junior Eurovision Song Contest, Toddlers and Tiaras, RTÉ News and Sport, Family Fortunes, The Nathan Carter Show, Ireland's Paramedics, Getting High for God, U2 Live in Paris
11	11	1 December 2016
I'm a Celebrity...Get Me Out of Here!, Classic Joe Dolan, The X Factor, Dangerous Earth: Lightning, The Apprentice, Breaking the Silence, The Local Eye, The Wizard of Oz
12	12	8 December 2016
The Late Late Toy Show, An Ríl Deal, Cosc Social Experiment commercial, The Airport Up In Knock, Finding Banni, Don't Tell the Bride, TOTP2: Christmas 2012
13	13	15 December 2016
"Maddest Moments": The Sunday Game, 50 Ways To Kill Your Mammies, Emmerdale, RTÉ Weather / Today with Maura and Daithi, The X Factor, Kevin McGahernʼs America, Sky News, Naked Attraction, The Late Late Show
14	14	22 December 2016
"A Year of Great Telly": Sister Act, Winning Streak, RTÉ News and Sport, Planet Earth 2, Stand Up to Cancer, Stetsons and Stilettos, Inside Trinity, Catchphrase

=== Series 2 (2017) ===
No. overall	No. in series	Original release date
15	1	8 February 2017
Celebrity Big Brother, TV3 12.30 News, The Secret Life of 5 Year Olds, Spy in the Wild, Ellen, Living on the List, Confessions of a Paparazzi, The Birds
16	2	15 February 2017
First Dates, TV3 News, Today with Maura and Daithi, Spring Break With Grandad, Dragons' Den, Beauty Queen & Single, Toughest Place to be a..., The Late Late Show
17	3	22 February 2017
Dancing with the Stars, The Real Marigold Hotel, Celebrity MasterChef, The Great British Skinny Dip, Life Animated, Steve Backshall's Extreme Mountain Challenge, Only Connect
18	4	1 March 2017
Room to Improve, RTÉ News: Six One, The Supervet, Love At First Kiss, Murder She Wrote, The Two Million Calorie Buffet, Ross Kemp: Libya's Migrant Hell, Operation Transformation
19	5	8 March 2017
Ant & Dec's Saturday Night Takeaway, RTÉ News: Six One, How'd You Get So Rich?, The Big Spell, Four Days in November, The Last Leg, Deafening, Better Than the Original
20	6	15 March 2017
Daniel & Majella's B&B Road Trip, TV3 News, A Killing In My Family, The Secrets of Your Food, Wild Things, Don't Tell the Bride, Éire Fhiáin, The Late Late Show
21	7	22 March 2017
St. Patrick's Day Festival, Britain's Next Top Model, RTÉ News: 9 O'Clock, What Are You Eating?, Random Acts As Gaeilge, Snake City, Beat the Brain, The Dubliners: Live at Vicar Street
22	8	29 March 2017
Stetsons & Stilettos, Three Wives, One Husband, Dancing with the Stars, The Restaurant, All Round to Mrs. Brown's, Portrait Artist of the Year, Treehouse Masters, Comic Relief: Red Nose Day
23	9	5 April 2017
First Dates, TV3 News: The 5.30, How Quizzing Got Cool: TV's Brains of Britain, Flashy Funerals, Ireland's Beauty Queens, Bare Knuckle Fight Club, The Zoo, Scannál: Caught in a Rat Trap
24	10	12 April 2017
Big Week on the Farm, Bondi Rescue, Me and My Dog: The Ultimate Contest, Mary Magdalene: Art's Scarlet Woman, Galapagos, Nazi Scrapbooks from Hell, Catastrophe, The Silence of the Lambs
25	11	19 April 2017
Reeling In the Years, Britain's Got Talent, At Your Service, The World According To Kids, The Late Late Show, My Online Nightmare, The Knowledge: The World's Toughest Taxi Test, Tracks & Trails
26	12	26 April 2017
Fair City, RTÉ News, Grit: Honey Badger Tough, Antiques Roadshow, Obsessive Compulsive Cleaners, Mind Over Marathon, Trawlermen Tales, Grease
27	13	3 May 2017
"Best Bits": Dancing with the Stars, Spy in the Wild, RTÉ News: Six One, Ant & Dec's Saturday Night Takeaway, First Dates, Portrait Artist of the Year, The Big Spell, Stetsons & Stilettos

=== Series 3 (2017) ===
No. overall	No. in series	Original release date
28	1	13 September 2017
Cannonball, It's A Park's Life, Killer In The Family, Man V Animal: Jellyfish, The Spouse House, Should I Marry My Cousin: Perfect Marriage, Astronauts: Have You Got What It Takes?
29	2	20 September 2017
The X Factor, The Secret Life of the Ballroom, The Great British Bake Off, My Cat From Hell, Nationwide, Educating Greater Manchester, Celebs Go Dating, GAA: All Ireland Final
30	3	27 September 2017
This Morning, Schizophrenia - The Voices in My Head, First Dates, The Late Late Show, Piers Morgan's Life Stories: Michael Flatley, Frock Finders, 3News: The 12.30, Ploughing Championships Live
31	4	4 October 2017
Top of The Pops; 90's, The Babymakers, Liar, Irish In Wonderland, World's Weirdest Animal Faces, Farewell Vera, Celebrity Operation Transformation, BBC News at Six: Hugh Hefner
32	5	11 October 2017
Zoolander, Louis Theroux; Dark States 1: Heroin town, Barbie: The Most Famous Doll in the World, Blind Date, Sky News: Swipe, Your Face or Mine?, This Morning
33	6	18 October 2017
The Late Late Show, Say Yes to the Dress, Extreme Couponing, The Supervet, Livin' With Lucy, Trauma, Just Tattoo of Us, Freedom Uncut
34	7	25 October 2017
The Graham Norton Show, The Great British Bake Off, Vogue: For Love Or Money, Sky News Sunrise,Today with Maura and Daithi, Gordon Ramsay on Cocaine, My Week as a Muslim, Bullseye
35	8	1 November 2017
Blue Planet 2, Strictly Come Dancing, TV3 News, Nigella: At My Table, Ireland's Fittest Family, Speechless, Salon Confidential, How Mattress Mick revolutionised the marketing of mattresses
36	9	8 November 2017
Harry Styles At The BBC, Ireland's Refugee Hotel, Generation What?, Golden: Our 50 Years of Marriage, It's Me or the Dog, RTÉ News at One, Judge Rinder, The Late Late Show
37	10	15 November 2017
BBC Children in Need Rocks the 80's, RTÉ News: Six One, The Apprentice, The Crowded House, Livin' With Lucy, Big Life Fix, The Sixth Sense, Coca-Cola Christmas Ad: Holidays Are Coming
38	11	22 November 2017
Today with Maura and Daithi, Stetsons and Stilettos, The X Factor, British Workers Wanted, Fair City, Posh Pets, Ireland's Fittest Family, The Late Late Show

=== Series 4 (2018) ===
No. overall	No. in series	Original release date
39	1	5 September 2018
The X Factor, Irish Paint Magic, Drinkers Like Me: Adrian Chiles, Peng Life, Francis Brennan's Grand Tour South Africa, Portlaoise: The Town, Dr. Pimple Popper, Orangutan Jungle School
40	2	12 September 2018
The Late Late Show, Judge Rinder, Who Do You Think You Are?, Spying on my Family, Find Me a Home, Celebrity Island with Bear Grylls, The Extreme Diet Hotel, RTÉ News: Six One
41	3	19 September 2018
The Rotunda, Big Brother, Dirty Dancing, The X Factor, Livin' with Lucy, The Great British Bake Off, Vogue: Is Monogamy Dead?, Orla Tinsley: Warrior, Say Yes to the Dress Ireland, This Morning
43	4	26 September 2018
Keeping Up With The Kardashians, Féile: An Trip go Tipp, Bodyguard, Fair City, Virgin Media News at 5.30, The Supervet, Chase the Case, Ploughing Championships Live
44	5	3 October 2018
First Dates Hotel, The X Factor, Countryfile - One Man and His Dog, Great Lighthouses of Ireland, The Great British Bake Off, Back in Time for the Factory, Catchphrase, Lessons from a School Shooting: Notes from Dunblane, Strangers
45	6	10 October 2018
Virgin Media News, Last Chance Lawyer, This Crowded House, The Placebo Experiment, Blood, Inside James's, Big Brother, Doctor Who
46	7	17 October 2018
The Late Late Show, Jean-Claude Van Damme: Behind Closed Doors, Old Peoples Home For 4 Year Olds, Shoulder to Shoulder, Today with Maura and Daithi, RTÉ News: Nine O'Clock, For Facts Sake, The Snapper
47	8	31 October 2018
RTÉ News: Six One, Blood, The Ghost Inside My Child, Ireland's Deep Atlantic, Ireland's Fittest Family, Stand Up to Cancer, Embarrassing Pets, Final Destination
48	9	7 November 2018
The Great British Bake Off, Winning Streak, First Dates, We Need to Talk About Mam, The Late Late Show, Catfish: The TV Show, Steve Austin's Broken Skull Challenge, Strictly Come Dancing, Blood
49	10	14 November 2018
Dynasties, Hector - Ó Siberia Go Saigon, The Heist, Liveline: Call Back, Tabú: Foréigean Gan Choinne, The Apprentice, Blood, The Keith & Paddy Picture Show

=== Series 5 (2019) ===
No. overall	No. in series	Original release date
50	1	11 September 2018
Who Wants To Be A Millionaire?, The Big Hospital Experiment, Treasure Island With Bear Grylls, First Dates Hotel, The Keith Barry Experience, Livin' With Lucy, The Late Late Show, BBC News at One
51	2	18 September 2019
The Restaurant, Prime Time, A Confession, The Rotunda, sMothered, Who Do You Think You Are?, Laura Brennan: This Is Me, This Morning
52	3	25 September 2019
First Dates, Japan With Sue Perkins, A Star Is Born, Fair City, Virgin Media News at 5.30, True North: Strippograms: Bras, Baby Oil and Balaclavas, Only Connect, The Butcher
53	4	2 October 2019
Don't Tell the Bride, Raised by the Village, Treasure Island With Bear Grylls, Britain's Got Talent: The Champions, Rugby World Cup Japan 2019, Love In The Countryside, Saving Lives at Sea, Why Can't We Sleep?
54	5	9 October 2019
Virgin Media News at 5.30, Britain's Got Talent: The Champions, Daniel & Majella's USA Road Trip, The Apprentice, Darklands, Stupid Man, Smart Phone, Living Undocumented, The Dog House
55	6	16 October 2019
Grand Designs, The X Factor: Celebrity, Pulling With My Parents, Today with Maura and Daithi, Channel 4 News, Snackmasters, Brendan Grace - Thanks For The Memories, The Rotunda
56	7	23 October 2019
Monster Croc Wrangler, Ghost, The Wall, Francis Brennan: All Hands On Deck, The Met: Policing London, Fair City, My Famous Babysitter, Spencer, Vogue And Wedding Two
57	8	30 October 2019
Take Me Out (British game show), Channel 4 News, The X Factor: Celebrity, Seven Worlds, One Planet, Ireland's Fittest Family, OAP B&B, The British Tribe Next Door, The Shining
58	9	16 February 2020
"Looks Back - Part One": Garda Patrol, Live at 3, Murphy's Micro Quiz-M, Head 2 Toe, Fair City, The Late Late Show, Radharc, Beo Le Brídóg
59	10	23 February 2020
"Looks Back - Part Two"

=== Series 6 (2020) ===
No. overall	No. in series	Original release date
60	1	5 September 2020
Lodgers for Codgers, The Late Late Show, Virgin Media News at 5.30, The Diagnostic Detectives, The 2 Johnnies Do America, Vicky Phelan: The Big Interview, The Deceived, The Man Who Wanted To Fly
61	2	16 September 2020
Ireland:AM, My Octopus Teacher, Rich Kids Go Homeless, Virgin Media News at 5.30, Big Year In Big School, The South Westerlies, The Black Full Monty, Love On The Spectrum
62	3	23 September 2020
Who Wants To Be A Millionaire?, RTÉ News: Six One, My Feet Are Killing Me, The Write Offs, First Love, EastEnders, The Irish Pub, Tiny Creatures
63	4	30 September 2020
Lodging with Lucy, The Great British Bake Off, Five Guys A Week, RTÉ News: Six One, The Late Late Show, Mary Berry's Simple Comforts, Freddie Flintoff: Living With Bulimia, Bohemian Rhapsody
64	5	7 October 2020
First Dates, Channel 4 News, News at 12.30, Mountain Vets, Me, My Brother & Our Balls, Big Year In Big School, Catfish: The TV Show, Des, Today with Maura and Daithi, RTÉ News Special
65	6	14 October 2020
The Tonight Show, Hector Africa - A go Z, Married At First Sight, Catwalk: Tales From The Cat Show Circuit, Lodging with Lucy, The Comey Rule, The Confessors, Mucho, Mucho Amor: The Legend of Walter Mercado
66	7	21 October 2020
RTÉ News: Nine O'Clock, This Morning, Katie, The Joy of Painting, DIY SOS: The Big Build Ireland, RTÉ News: Six One, Autumn at Jimmy's Farm, Sir Cliff Richard at the BBC
67	8	28 October 2020
First Dates, News at 5.30, The Million Pound Cube, Tricked Out Tractors, (Un)well, The Trump Show, Donal's Family Food In Minutes, Halloween

=== Series 7 (2021) ===
No. overall	No. in series	Original release date
68	1	1 September 2021
Cooking with Paris, Vigil, Our Lives: Pride Of Place, Extreme Food Phobics, RTÉ News: Six One, Celebrity SAS: Who Dares Wins, Sexy Beasts, Phil Lynott: Songs For While I'm Away
69	2	8 September 2021
The Big Deal, News at 12.30, Cat Hospital, Married At First Sight, Only Fans: Ireland's X-Rated, BBC News at Ten, Extraordinary Twins, Footloose
70	3	15 September 2021
Kin, Serengeti II, First Dates, Fair City, Virgin News at 12:30, The Killing of Fr. Niall Molloy, Grand Designs, The Rotunda
71	4	22 September 2021
Patrick Kielty: One Hundred Years Of Union, We Are The Champions - Cheese Rolling, The North Water, Beat the Chasers, The Repair Shop, Fantastic Fungi, Toddlers and Tiaras: Where Are They Now?, Prime Time
72	5	29 September 2021
Spice Girls: How Girl Power Changed Britain, Cocooned, Foxy's Fearless 48 Hours, The Great British Bake Off, Awake: The Million Dollar Game, Married At First Sight, Prince Philip: The Royal Family Remembers, Cats
73	6	6 October 2021
The Love Triangle, RTÉ News: Nine O'Clock, RTÉ News: One O'Clock, Keys To My Life, Dr. Pimple Popper: Biggest Transformations, Antisocial Ireland, Love on the Spectrum, The Mating Game, Squid Game
74	7	13 October 2021
Kin, Breakdown: Ireland's Mental Health Battle, Naked, Alone and Racing to Get Home, Diana: The Musical, First Dates, Never Mind The Buzzcocks, RTÉ News: One O'Clock, The Big Deal
75	8	20 October 2021
Lady Boss: The Jackie Collins Story, Angela Black, Steph's Packed Lunch, Livin' With Lucy, RTÉ News: Six One, The Great British Bake Off, Special Forces: Ultimate Hell Week - The Professionals, Dementia & Us
76	9	27 October 2021
Today with Maura and Daithi, News at 12.30, The Mating Game, Four Hours at the Capitol, Coronation Street, Pulling With My Parents, Donal's Family Kitchen, Breastfeeding My Boyfriend
77	10	3 November 2021
Livin' With Lucy, Prime Time, The Irish Wedding, Wild Mountain Thyme, Ireland's Fittest Family, The Love Trap, Sex, Love & Goop, Kin
78	11	19 November 2021
79	12	27 November 2021

=== Series 8 (2022) ===
No. overall	No. in series	Original release date
80	1	31 August 2022
Rose of Tralee, This is My House, The Repair Shop, The Accused: National Treasures on Trial, News at 5.30, Are You The One? UK, How to Build a Sex Room, House of the Dragon, News at 12.30, RTÉ News: Nine O'Clock, Lion: The Rise and Fall of The Marsh Prides
81	2	7 September 2022
The Late Late Show, Cheap Irish Homes, Married At First Sight, North Sea Connection, News at 12.30, The Case I Can't Forget, Keys To My Life, Send Nudes: Body S.O.S, Celebrity SAS: Who Dares Wins, The Voice UK
82	3	14 September 2022
BBC News: The Queen, Ireland:AM, Frozen Planet II, News at 5.30, Takeaway Titans, Dirty House Rescue: Queens of Clean, The Notebook, First Dates Hotel, True North: Rat Woman
83	4	21 September 2022
The Great British Bake Off, Welcome to Wrexham, Ninja Warrior UK: Race for Glory, Changing Rooms, Bad Sisters, RTÉ News: Six One, Broke, Kings of Pain
84	5	28 September 2022
This Morning, How Long Will You Live?, The Grand Tour: A Scandi Flick, The War At Home, Crossfire, Married At First Sight, News at 5.30, Jackass Forever
85	6	5 October 2022
Ireland's Fittest Family, The Kardashians, The Restaurant, Grand Designs, News at 12.30, Emma Willis: Delivering Babies, Monster: The Jeffrey Dahmer Story, Reel Stories: Robbie Williams, Today with Maura and Daithi, First Dates Hotel
86	7	12 October 2022
The Great British Bake Off, Lucy Investigates: Sex in The Suburbs, Jon Richardson: Take My Mother-in-Law, Head On: Rugby, Dementia, The Tonight Show, 90 Day Fiancé UK, Hashtag Dogs, RTÉ News: Nine O'Clock, Foster & Allen; Lost in The Music, Forged in Fire
87	8	19 October 2022
I Can See Your Voice, News at 5.30, Dermot Bannon's Incredible Homes, Mother Teresa: For The Love of God?, Bad Sisters, The Disconnect, Sue Perkins: Perfectly Legal, Niall Horan's Homecoming: The Road to Mullingar with Lewis Capaldi, Celebrity SAS: Who Dares Wins, Make Me Prime Minister
88	9	26 October 2022
Love Is Blind: UK, BBC News at One: NI Assembly, Mountain Vets, Prime Time, Emmerdale, The Change: Ireland's Menopause Story, Floor is Lava, Fatal Attraction, RuPaul's Drag Race UK, The Wheel
89	10	2 November 2022
Build Your Own Home, This Morning, BBC Newsline, The Babadook, Ireland's Fittest Family, Jimmy Carr Destroys Art, The Repair Shop: A Royal Visit, 28 Days Haunted, Come Dine With Me, Hector: Balkans Go Baltic
90	11	4 January 2023
Emmerdale, Married At First Sight, BBC News, How to Build a Sex Room, The Change: Ireland's Menopause Story, News at 5.30, Ireland:AM, Monster: The Jeffrey Dahmer Story
91	12	11 January 2023
The Grand Tour: A Scandi Flick, Lucy Investigates: Sex In The Suburbs, News at 5.30, Emma Willis: Delivering Babies, The Late Late Show, Bad Sisters, The Rose of Tralee, 28 Days Haunted

=== Series 9 (2023) ===
No. overall	No. in series	Original release date
92	1	6 September 2023
The Finish Line, Ireland:AM, Running Wild With Bear Grylls: The Challenge, The Tower 2: Death Message, Confessions, Say Yes To The Dress With Tan France, Secrets Of the Female Orgasm, Nothing Compares
93	2	13 September 2023
Mrs. Brown's Boys, News at 5.30, The Tonight Show, Born Too Soon, Selling Super Houses, Richie Sadlier - Let's Talk About Sex, Top Boy, MILF Manor, Baby Gorilla
94	3	20 September 2023
This is TV3, News @Six, The Box, Perfect Match, News at 12.30, Ireland:AM, Vicky Phelan: The Big Interview, Open House: The Great Sex Experiment, Ireland Says Yes: TV3
95	4	27 September 2023
Fair City, Alan Carr's Picture Slam, Gra Ar an Tra, The Deepest Breath, The Late Late Show, Brian & Arthur's Very Modern Family, Joanne & Vogue's Sex Drive, Top Gun: Maverick
96	5	4 October 2023
RTE News, Keith's Teeth: A Dental Odyssey, Scarlett's Driving School, DNA Family, Love in the Country, Four in a Bed, Who Killed Jill Dando?, The Great British Bake Off
97	6	1 October 2023
Beckham, EastEnders, The Tonight Show, Big Little Journeys, The Kardashians, Saving Lives at Sea, Spooked: Ireland, The Fast and The Farmer-ish
98	7	18 October 2023
Wilderness, Ireland:AM, The Reckoning, Secrets of a Delivery Driver, Hector: O Na Philippines Go Dti Na Solomons, Wrestlers, Blankety Blank, The Lion King
99	8	25 October 2023
Coleen Rooney: The Real Wagatha Story, The 2 Johnnies Late Night Lock In, Planet Earth III, My Mum, Your Dad, The Gone, Awake Surgery, Curfa, Sex Rated
100	9	1 November 2023
Help! My House Is Haunted, The Morning, Survivor, Hunting The Catfish Crime Gang, The Year That Rocked Irish Dancing, Paul O'Grady: For the Love of Dogs, Grand Designs, Scream
101	10	8 November 2023
Donal Skehan: Home Cook, The Voice UK, My Body Fix, Catfish: The TV Show, Don't Look Down, Untold: Only Fans Got Me Fired, Banged Up, Barbie
102	11	10 January 2024
103	12	17 January 2024

=== Series 10 (2024) ===
No. overall	No. in series	Original release date
104	1	4 September 2024
News at 5.30, Dead and Buried, The Gentle Art of Swedish Death Cleaning, The Answer Run, On The Beat, Prime Time, Dating Naked UK
105	2	11 September 2024
The Voice UK, News at 5.30, Love Is Blind: UK, America’s New Female Right, Nico’s Cook In, Cook Out, EastEnders, Ireland’s Thalidomide Scandal, Chestnut vs. Kobayashi: Unfinished Beef
106	3	18 September 2024
Fair City, This Morning, Skywalkers: A Love Story, Cheap Irish Homes, BBC News at One, Emma Willis: Delivering Babies, Nightsleeper, The Grand Tour: One For The Road
107	4	25 September 2024
Ant & Dec's Limitless Win, Dead & Buried, RTE Investigates: Inside the Protests, Married At First Sight, News at 5.30, Patrick: A Young Traveller Lost, Celebrity SAS: Who Dares Wins, Selling Sunset
108	5	2 October 2024
The Great British Bake Off, The Tower 3: Gallowstree Lane, Into the Jungle with Ed Stafford, Ireland:AM, Our Lives: The Omagh Hum, Parole, First Dates, Will and Harper
109	6	9 October 2024
The Late Late Show, Married At First Sight, News at 12.30, My Feet Are Killing Me, Real Life With Lucy, Living Every Second, The Great British Bake Off, E.T. the Extra-Terrestrial
110	7	16 October 2024
Big Brother, Life Actually, Rick Stein Food Stories, Who Wants To Be A Millionaire?, At Your Service, Coma, Caught in The Act: Unfaithful, Anorexia, My Family and Me
111	8	23 October 2024
The 2 Johnnies Late Night Lock In, Kay Burley @ Breakfast, This Morning, Champions: Full Gallop, Love in the Country, UHL; Irelands Hospital Crisis, BBC News at Ten, Rivals
112	9	30 October 2024
Love Is Blind: UK Fair City, The Group Chat, Ramsay's Kitchen Nightmares USA, The Case I Can't Forget: ATM Heist, Will and Ralph Should Know Better, Solar System, Smile
113	10	6 November 2024
Today with Maura and Daithi, Asia, Will You Marry Me?, Mary's Foolproof Dinners, I Cut Off His Penis: Truth Behind The Headlines, News at 12.30, Leathered: Violence in Irish Schools, Titanic

=== Series 11 (2025) ===
No. overall	No. in series	Original release date
114	1	10 September 2025
Who Wants To Be A Millionaire?, EastEnders, Conor Mcgregor pres, Danny Dyer: How To Be A Man, Home Rescue, South Park, Dating Naked UK, Jaws
115	2	17 September 2025
The Traitors Ireland, With Love, Meghan, Eurovision Boycott RTE, The Girlfriend, The Late Late Show, True North: My Stammer, My Story, Olivia Attwood: The Price of Perfection, Unknown Number: The High School Catfish
116	3	24 September 2025
Fair City, Married At First Sight, Cheap Irish Homes, Trump UK visit RTE, Trainwreck: Poop Cruise, This Morning, Task
117	4	1 October 2025
House of Guinness, RuPaul's Drag Race UK, Prime Time, Untold: Ibiza Final Boss, The Walsh Sisters, Match Me Abroad, The Trial of Richard Satchwell, Ireland:AM
118	5	7 October 2025
Dragons' Den, Dinner With The Enemy, The Voice US, The Great British Bake Off, DIY SOS: The Big Build Ireland, Nightmares of Nature, The Graham Norton Show, Wayward
119	6	15 October 2025
Livin' With Lucy, Love Is Blind: UK, Hunted, Gaza Ceasefire, Rebel Education, Monster: The Ed Gein Story, Faithless, Come Dine With Me
120	7	22 October 2025
Beat the Chasers, BBC News at Ten, Worlds Apart, Obituary, Made of Stone, Dispatches: Will AI Take My Job?, The Morning, I Kissed A Boy
121	8	29 October 2025
Hollyoaks, RTE News, The 2 Johnnies Late Night Lock In, Secrets of Supercheap Shopping, The Late Late Show - Westlife, Ambulance, Dr. Pimple Popper, Sinners
122	9	5 November 2025
The Celebrity Traitors, Fair City, Ireland's Fittest Family, Livin' With Lucy, RTE News, Molly Mae, Game of Wool: Britain's Best Knitter, It: Welcome to Derry
123	10	12 November 2025
124	11	19 November 2025
125	12	26 November 2025

=== Series 12 (2026) ===
No. overall	No. in series	Original release date
126	1	9 September 2026
RTÉ News: One O'Clock, Misery, Celebrity MasterChef, The 1% Club, Untold Raygun: Breaking Badly, Love Overboard, RTÉ News: Nine O’Clock, Stolen Babies, Dolly Parton: An American Original
127	2	16 September 2026
The Traitors Ireland, Emergency 24/7, Hungry, EastEnders, Four in a Bed, Squatters, RTÉ News: Six One, The Grand Tour
128	3	23 September 2026
Wisdom of the Crowd, News at 5.30, Clickbait Clinic with Stacey Dooley, Nationwide, The Traitors Ireland, Policing Dublin City, Hey Beautiful: Anatomy of a Romance Scam, The Dark
129	4	30 September 2026
Tall Tales & Murder, Eric Roberts: Crisis in the Classroom, The Wargame, Dragons' Den, Fair City, Tempting Fortune, DIY SOS, News at 5.30
130	5	7 October 2026
Wonka’s The Golden Ticket, Blue Lights, Grand Designs, Ireland AM, The Celebrity Traitors, Deepfake Ireland, Celebrity Help! My House Is Haunted, The 2 Johnnies’ Late Night Lock In
131	6	14 October 2026
War, Oasis: Don’t Look Back in Anger, My AI Relationship, The Great British Bake Off, Wilderness with Simon Reeve, Coronation Street, The Real Rooneys, RTÉ Investigates: Fertility Uncovered
132	7	21 October 2026
Kill Jackie, Africa: Earth’s Wild Home, Celebrity Ex on the Beach, This Morning, Fair City, Filthy Fortunes, Health Hysteria: Are Women Being Gaslit?, TODAY: In Ireland
133	8	28 October 2026
Crystal Lake, One Born Every Minute, EPIC: Elvis Presley in Concert, The Graham Norton Show, Come Dine with Me, Prime Time, Is It Cake? Halloween, News at 5.30, One Born Every Minute
134	9	4 November 2026
Boyzone: One for the Road, Ireland's Fittest Family, Ramsay’s Kitchen Nightmares USA, Blue Planet III, Busted, First Dates, The Celebrity Traitors, Ireland AM
135	10	11 November 2026
Rob & Romesh Vs, A Ring and a Prayer, Alid's Next Big Seller, All’s Fair, VM News: Midterm Elections, Trauma: My Broken Brain, Celebrity Catchphrase, Grease
136	11	TBA
137	12	TBA

=== Specials (2018) ===
No. in series	Title	Original release date
1	"Gogglebox Does TV3"	20 September 2018
2	"Gogglebox Does The 80s and 90s"	9 January 2019
2	"Gogglebox Does The 00s and Now"	16 January 2019

== Cast ==
Family	Series	Background
The Grufferty Family	1 -	Alex, Georgina, Laura and Des Grufferty are bringing the family dynamic back to the Gogglebox couch this season. Laura keeps busy with her work in hair and beauty, and Des helps out with the family business and enjoys cooking for the family too. When it comes to telly, Des enjoys food and nature programmes, while Laura has a soft spot for the soaps. They also enjoy a bit of Big Brother together, and with different tastes in TV, there’s bound to be plenty of debate over what to watch!
Jamie, Lindsay, Ashley and Gráinne: The Cabra Girls	1 - 9	The group of friends from Cabra, Dublin are self-confessed reality TV addicts and their ideal Friday night is staying in with some TV and white wine. Lindsay and Ashley are sisters, but the foursome have been inseparable for years. Jamie recently gave birth to her first child, a baby boy, Cobey and is absolutely smitten.
Fergal and Neal Tully	1 - 6 8-	The identical twins grew up on a farm along with three older brothers. The two are extremely close claiming that they speak to each other more than their own wives. Neal has three daughters and has been married 15 years. He lives his life through the four Fs, Football, Family, Friends and Fianna Fáil. Fergal, on the other hand, is described as managing local football teams while working on the family pig and dairy farm. He loves sport and is jealous of his brother's Sky Sports package.
Angela and Eileen	1 -	They met at a retirement club and have been best friends since. Angela is from Dublin while Eileen is originally from Kilkenny. They are usually accompanied by Michael T Higgins, their much-loved tea cosy.
The Ryan Family	1 -	Single Mum Eva and her sons James and Alex live in Monaleen, Limerick. James and Alex are studying Computer Science and they have a close relationship with their Mum even though she likes to mortify them at any opportunity.
John and Dave	1 -	Friends John and David have been best friends for 10 years and love their TV so much that they organise their social schedule around their favourite shows. John's claim to fame is that he once appeared on Graham Norton's red chair to tell a story about Madonna - and didn't get tipped out of it!
The Naughton Family	1 - 2	Blessington residents Sheila and Alice Naughton appear on the series with their Dad Declan and have a shared hobby of Amateur Drama. Declan is an HR Consultant and Sheila is studying at Trinity College.
Tracie and Anita	1 -	Friends Tracie and Anita grew up together in The Liberties area of Dublin. Their Mums were best friends and now their children are. Anita reckons she's the sister Tracie never had. Tracie's much-loved pets Kenny Dog-Leish and bold cat Bibby often feature in Gogglebox Ireland and occasionally steal the show.
Tadhg and Ettie	2 -	Tadhg and his granny Ettie have been close for years and love nothing more than a good chat and a laugh together. Tadhg is a drag queen from Limerick and describes their relationship as cheeky, with a mutual understanding and plenty of support for one another. There’s no one he’d rather spend time watching telly with than his granny. Tadhg loves Dead to Me while Ettie, who is retired, enjoys Downton Abbey. Tadhg would love to watch telly with CMAT and Ettie would pick Liam Neeson.
The Adenuga Family	1 - 4	The Adenugas moved to Navan in 2004 and quickly settled into the Meath community, with mum Yemi Adenuga becoming one of the most prominent female figures in African-Irish society. Dad Deji is a renowned Nollywood actor, splitting his time between Ireland and movie sets in Nigeria. Opinionated oldest daughter Loretta got married last year in a traditional ceremony in Nigeria. Now living in Drogheda with her husband, they are expecting their first child in the autumn. Aishling is the only one of the four born in Ireland and heading into her leaving cert year.
Martin and Rory	1 - 3	Living in Dublin, Martin and Rory have been close friends and bridge partners for over 10 years and still play bridge together up to three times a week. Rory runs the biggest Bridge congress in Ireland. Martin is a university lecturer.
Paul and Paul	1 - 2	Despite an age gap of over twenty years, the two Pauls get on famously. They met several years ago at Paul Roche's IT shop; the two bonded over a love of music and conversation. Paul Healy Roberts calls into Paul Roche's house about three times a week for a catch up and to watch a bit of telly.Paul Roche is originally from Kilkenny but came to visit Youghal 16 years ago and never looked back. Paul Healy Roberts grew up on a farm. He has lived a "colourful" life with a variety of jobs, from running a restaurant to selling sandwiches outside a Michael Jackson concert.
Shelly and Jonny	2	Shelly and Jonny met 13 years ago when they were both working in a local bar. Fast forward to now and they are happily married. Although they live in Ballina, Jonny is originally from Crossmolina and Shelly is a Roscommon woman. Shelly and Jonny are both daredevils and love rollercoasters. They have ridden 7 of the world's top 10 rollercoasters and are determined to finish the list.
Laura and Aisling	2 - 3	Laura and Aisling have been friends since they met in a Greystones nightclub as teenagers. Now both Mums with three children each, they still live in the Greystones area.
The Morans	2 -	The Morans from Portlaoise are a GAA and soccer mad family, who enjoy watching TV together and having a laugh. Dad Denis is originally from Kilkenny and is devoted to Manchester United and Brian Cody's Kilkenny Hurlers. Anne-Marie and Denis met through mutual friends at a party in Dublin and have been married for 30 years. Eldest daughter Chloe works in Dublin and younger sister Gráinne is heading off to college for her first year. Miniature Yorkshire terriers Bella and Scooby join them on the sofa and Chloe says her Mum treats them nearly better than her own kids.
Dawn and Dale	2 -	Dale and Dawn from Carrigaline, Cork are best friends as much as they are partners. They love spending time together, having a laugh and switching off in front of the telly. Dawn says Dale is her biggest critic, while Dale reckons they’re both as bad as each other! Dawn loves Friends, The Office and One Tree Hill, while Dale enjoys RuPaul’s Drag Race and Law & Order: SVU. Dawn is a fan of rom-coms, while Dale loves Ireland’s Fittest Family and The Great British Bake Off.
Micheal, David and Gerry: The Louth Lads	3 - 4	Micheal, David and Gerry have been best friends since childhood and all live within five minutes from each other in the Cooley Peninsula in County Louth. The trio all attended the same primary and secondary schools, but then went their separate ways for college. Despite their busy lifestyles, they still make time for a weekly 'Lads Night In' to catch-up on the telly in Gerry's parents' house.
Pat and Siobhán	3 -	Siobhán and Pat have been together for 25 years and live near Dublin's City Centre. Pat is an Archaeologist from County Limerick who says he fell in love with Dublin the minute he arrived here. Siobhán was born in Dublin, studied Architecture and is now an Illustrator. They met at the National Museum, where Pat worked for more than 40 years. They own two dogs - brother and sister Misto and Daze.
Deirdre and Áine	4 -	Mum Deirdre Murphy and daughter Áine Flynn hail from Courtlough, County Dublin. Áine, a member of the Irish Clay Pigeon shooting team, plays an active role in running the family business; an adventure centre and clay pigeon shooting grounds. When Deirdre, aka "Nana Dee" is not chasing around after eleven grandchildren, she works as a psychotherapist. Áine and Deirdre describe themselves as being similar to the Gilmore girls, except older and Irish!
Padraig and Anna	4 -	The pair are from Togher, County Cork and met thirteen years ago when Anna became Padraig's personal assistant. After eight years of working together, the pair fell in love and have been with each other for five years now. What's even more exciting is that they have an 18 month old Labrador called 'Juno'. He's being trained to be an assistant dog.
Claire and Roger	4	Claire and Roger met in University more than 20 years ago and now have 2 children. Claire is originally from Omagh, County Tyrone, but her family had a massive TV aerial which picked up the Irish channels. Roger is from Banbridge, County Down, but his mum was from Dundalk and insisted on getting her weekly fix of The Late Late Show, so he also grew up watching Irish telly. Roger is a Global IT Programme Manager and Claire is a Clinical Specialist Speech & Language Therapist, specialising in rehab for throat cancer patients. She also lectures in Trinity College.
Barbara and Janet	5 -	The pair are telly-loving sisters from Donegal. Barbara runs her own B&B business while Janet is a retired social worker. Barbara is an avid rugby fan but admits that part of the reason is to get a good look at the player's legs! Meanwhile, Janet loves all things Irish on the telly and can't resist a bit of Nationwide. The sisters ultimate night in is in front of a classic Hollywood film.
Canaan, Pam and Jane	5 -	Hailing from Uganda, husband and wife Canaan and Pam, have lived in Ireland since 2014 with Pam's sister Jane. But the love affair with Ireland goes back to 2008 when Pam came here on what was meant to be a short holiday and turned into a year-long stint. They first moved to Dublin, then to Cavan before finally settling in Mallow. Pam works in insurance and Canaan has a degree in Digital Media and Marketing and currently works with young adults with learning disabilities. Jane is retired but recently started a course in Business Studies.
Blair, Gilmar & Lariche Mandiangu and Gary Parsons	6 - 7	Lucan-based couple, Gary Parsons and Lariche Mandiangu and Lariche's brothers, Gilmar and Blair Mandiangu. The foursome are telly addicts and growing up in Tallaght the Mandiangu siblings were constantly fighting over the remote control. The Mandiangus previously appeared as contestants on Ireland's Fittest Family. Gilmar was arrested for a series of road traffic offences, dangerous driving and driving without insurance, NCT or license earlier in the year and given a suspended sentence with a lengthy driving ban in Court this summer.
The Saunders Family	6 -	Helen and Der Saunders are joined by their sons Alan and Jack, and by Jack’s partner Katie on the Gogglebox couch. Jack works as a personal trainer, and he and Katie are saving for a place of their own while enjoying time with the family. With four of them and Bobby the dog watching together, there’s always plenty to chat about when it comes to the week’s telly.
David and Sarah	8 -	David and Sarah have been together for 5 years. She works in finance and he is in marketing. They live in a little terraced house with their two French bull-dogs, Tammy and Swanson. Fans of Gogglebox Ireland will recognise David from his time on the show sitting between two fellow Louth lads. They go camping very often, sleeping in a pod-like tent on top of their car, which David reckons is a TV show in itself. They booked and cancelled their wedding 4 times due to COVID-19 and finally tied the knot last June. They are both mad for telly, Sarah loves a good drama or a true-crime series and David is still obsessed with David Attenborough, but also a fan of the Office and Parks and Rec.
Conor and Emma	8 -	Conor and Emma are siblings and best friends. They are originally from Crumlin, and have lived in Bettystown for years, but Emma still goes into ‘town’ for a night out. Emma works in finance, is a keen cellist and plays netball. Conor enjoys drawing, playing video games and editing. He is heading to college this year to study IT. Since Emma got her driving licence, they love going on journeys together and singing along to Doja Cat, Harry Styles and Lady Gaga. Emma loves watching telly with brother Conor as they love the same shows and have a telepathic sense of humour. They LOVE reality TV, especially Drag Race, Bake Off and Dance Moms. They also enjoy the Chase and Derry Girls.
The Purcells	8	John's from Finglas, Lila's from Kilbarrack, and they moved to Ashbourne 25 years ago. John was a FIFA referee for 20 years and travelled the world, officiating at matches at the highest level. During his career he also refereed George Best. Lila works as an SNA in a local school and John has now retired.Emma works in finance and Laura works in real estate. The Purcells love rescuing animals, they have two cats, Binx and Bree, and two very affectionate lap dogs, Holly & Paco. John watches sport 24/7 which drives the girls mad. They all love good drama and big entertainment shows. The girls love Marvel movies and share a guilty pleasure - Jackass reruns. Lila is particularly into action movies and musicals.
Gregg, John, Eric, Johnny	7 -	Gregg, Jon, Eric and Johnny are four friends from Co. Carlow who bring plenty of banter and strong opinions to the Gogglebox couch. Big fans of sport, particularly GAA and soccer, the lads also enjoy drama and reality TV. Whether they’re agreeing or arguing over the week’s telly, there’s never a shortage of opinions between these four.
Amber, Amanda, Janet & Joella	12 -	Sisters Amanda and Amber have been best friends with Janet and Joella since meeting in secondary school. As they all live quite close to each other, TV watch parties have been a regular occurrence down through the years as they catch up on what's on the box over a cheeky glass of wine. They're big fans of reality TV, with anything from Big Brother to Love Island having them absolutely glued to the telly, but their absolute favourite show is Love is Blind! They also love a drama and anything they can sink their teeth into for the long haul, which is why they've just started catching up on Game of Thrones, better late than never!
Chloe, Carla, Craig, Jahrea	12 -	Following her time in the castle, Carla swapped the round table for the Gogglebox couch alongside her partner Chloe, her brother Craig and his partner Jahrea. They’re a close-knit bunch who enjoy watching telly together and enjoy bringing their family and friends dynamic to the sofa. Carla is keeping a close eye on the UK Celebrity Traitors. Herself and Chloe are both big fans of crime and drama, with Chicago PD and SWAT firm favourites, while Jahrea is a huge Friends fan. Craig is more of a football man, but when it comes to his favourite show of all time, it has to be The Inbetweeners.
Dave and Jackie	9 -	Dave and Jackie are husband and wife living in Mullingar, who love nothing more than spending time with their family and grandkids. Dave wears a few hats as a celebrant, broadcaster and Santa while Jackie is an elf and a proud nana. The pair love a good party and say there’s always plenty of laughter between them. Dave’s favourite show is The Wire, while Jackie loves Hill Street Blues. They’re both binge-watching Widow’s Bay, but Jackie also enjoys Married at First Sight and Celebs Go Dating, which always gets a reaction from her. If they could watch telly with anyone, they’d both pick Elvis, because he’s still the King!
Conor and Shane O'Donnell	12 -	Brothers Shane and Conor are from Shannon and are both students, with Shane studying drama and Conor studying hospitality. Passionate theatre enthusiasts, they’ve both taken part in local productions, while Shane also plays bass guitar in a band he formed with school friends and enjoys writing his own music. When it comes to television, Shane is a fan of history programmes, while Conor prefers settling in with a good cop show.
Pia, Ciara & Paul Styne	12 -	Siblings Ciara and Paul are from Offaly and join their mum Pia on the Gogglebox couch. Ciara teaches music in her spare time, with interests ranging from traditional music to techno. Paul spends much of his free time outside of college playing football. When it comes to television, Paul is a big Love Island fan, while Ciara prefers drama and entertainment shows. Pia is devoted to Emmerdale, much to the amusement of her children, who have grown tired of seeing the familiar jeep in the opening credits.
