= First date (disambiguation) =

A first date is the first meeting between two people with the aim of each assessing the other's suitability as a romantic partner.

First date may also refer to:

== Internet ==
- FirstDate, Singaporean government dating service

== Film ==
- First Date (film), a 2021 American mystery-comedy film

== Television ==
- First Dates, British dating series
  - First Dates (Australian TV series)
  - First Dates (Canadian TV series)
  - First Dates (Irish TV series)
  - First Dates (American TV series)
- "First Date" (Buffy the Vampire Slayer), a 2003 episode
- "First Date" (Frasier), a 1998 episode
- "First Date" (That '70s Show episode), a 1999 episode
- "First Date" (The Upper Hand), a 1991 episode
- "First Date" (Whitney), a 2011 episode

== Music ==
- "First Date" (Blink-182 song), 2001
- "First Date" (50 Cent song), 2012
- "First Date" a 1984 song by Yukiko Okada
- First Date (musical), a 2012 musical
- "First Date", a song from the WALL-E movie soundtrack composed by Thomas Newman

== Novels ==
- First Date, a teen horror book by R. L. Stine

== See also ==
- Mudhal Thethi, 1955 Indian film, literally First Date
