= James Blake (television presenter) =

Northern Irish television presenter

- Born: 7 July 1993 (age 33); Belfast, Northern Ireland, United Kingdom
- Occupations: Television presenter, documentary filmmaker
- Organization: BBC
- Known for: Hunting the Catfish Crime Gang, Hunting the Online Sex Predators, InstaScam: Who Stole My Face, "Men of the Manosphere"
- Awards: Royal Television Society Breakthrough Award (2024)

James Blake (born 7 July 1993) is a BBC television presenter and documentary filmmaker from Belfast, Northern Ireland.

In 2024, he received the Royal Television Society Northern Ireland Breakthrough Award. He presents the BBC One and BBC Three documentaries Hunting The Catfish Crime Gang (2023), Hunting the Online Sex Predators (2025) and Men of the Manosphere (2025).

== Career ==
In 2023, Blake presented Hunting the Catfish Crime Gang for BBC One and BBC Three, in which he began an investigation after discovering that his identity had been used in romance scams around the world. The documentary featured interviews with several scam victims, including Cecilie Fjellhøy from The Tinder Swindler. It explored the dangers of internet romance fraud, online deception, and exposed major criminal organisations involved in human trafficking and scams.

Hunting The Catfish Crime Gang has been released internationally under alternative titles. It's available on Telia Play in Sweden titled Instascam: Give Me Back My Face, New Zealand on TVNZ+ titled #Insta$cam: Who Stole My Face? and in Hong Kong on streaming service Now TV as Instascam, Who Stole My Face. Instascam: Give Me Back My Face is also available for streaming in VGTV in Norway.

In 2024, Hunting The Catfish Crime Gang was also released on VICE’s official YouTube channel, geo-locked to viewers in the United States, further extending its international reach.

In 2025, Blake presented a child sexual exploitation documentary titled Hunting the Online Sex Predators for BBC Three and BBC One. The programme followed him as he joined Cheshire Police in their investigation of online sex offenders.In the documentary, Baroness Beeban Kidron discusses how users can be “two clicks away” from child abuse content on social media platforms. James meets with Dr Kaitlyn Regehr from University College London who suggests that within one week of opening a new account on instagram there is a fourfold increase in the amount of misogynistic content. The film aimed to raise awareness and encourage meaningful change. As part of the investigation, Blake travelled to New York City to interview Arturo Bejar, a former Meta executive and whistleblower, about the company’s safety practices for young users. He also interviewed victims of human trafficking and joined the National Crime Agency during a law enforcement raid in Manila, Philippines.

In April 2025, Blake teased a major return to television in an interview with the News Letter, suggesting he was working on a new project following the success of his previous documentaries.

In August 2025, it was announced that Blake would present a BBC Three documentary, Men of the Manosphere, exploring how online communities shape the attitudes and experiences of boys and men. The programme was later released on BBC iPlayer in November 2025.

The documentary received media coverage following its release. Writing for Yahoo Entertainment, one article described it as "better than Louis Theroux’s Netflix manosphere film". In The Guardian, it was described as a "thoughtful, tender, terrifying hour".

== Early and personal life ==
Blake was born on 7 July 1993 in Belfast, Northern Ireland, to Anne Blake MBE who was awarded the honour for her services to adults with learning disabilities. He attended Fort Hill Integrated College.

== Filmography ==
As himself
| Year | Title | Role |
|---|---|---|
| 2023 | Hunting The Catfish Crime Gang | Presenter |
| 2023 | This Morning | Guest |
| 2024 | BBC Morning Live | Guest Presenter |
| 2024 | I Hunted My Scammers & Discovered a Dark Criminal Enterprise | Presenter |
| 2024 | InstaScam: Give Me Back My Face | Presenter |
| 2024 | Instascam: Give Me Back My Face | Presenter |
| 2024 | Instacam, Who Stole My Face | Presenter |
| 2024 | #Insta$cam: Who Stole My Face? | Presenter |
| 2025 | Hunting The Online Sex Predators | Presenter |
| 2025 | Men of the Manosphere | Presenter |

== Awards and nominations ==
| Year | Award | Category | Nominated work | Result |
|---|---|---|---|---|
| 2024 | Royal Television Society | Breakthrough Talent | Hunting The Catfish Crime Gang | Won |

== See also ==
- BBC iPlayer
