= Don't Tell the Bride =

Don't Tell the Bride may refer to:

- Don't Tell the Bride (British TV series)
- Don't Tell the Bride (Australian TV series)
- Don't Tell the Bride (Irish TV series)
