= David Willis =

David Willis may refer to:

- David Willis (artist) (born 1932), Irish artist
- David Willis (cartoonist) (David M. Willis, born 1979), American web cartoonist
- David Willis (Australian footballer) (born 1968), Australian rules footballer
- David Willis (English footballer) (David Lalty Willis, 1881–1949)
- David Willis (journalist) (David Rowland Willis, born 1960), English journalist in the United States
- David Willis (linguist) (David W. E. Willis, fl. from 1996), linguist and Celticist
- David Willis (politician) (fl. from 2021), American politician in North Carolina
- Dave Willis (David Roger Willis, born 1970), American voice actor, writer, and producer
- Dave Willis (comedian) (David Williams, 1895–1973), Scottish comedian and actor
- Ski Beatz (David Anthony Willis, fl. from 1986), American record producer

== See also ==
- David Wills (disambiguation)
