= Réalta Agus Gaolta =

Réalta agus Gaolta is a talent contest formatted television show that has aired annually on TG4 since 2018. The programme is hosted by Síomha Ní Ruairc, and the competition is described as the search for "Ireland's most talented family".

Entrants perform their unique talent, be it playing musical instruments, singing or dancing in front of a live audience. There must be at least two members in the group and all members of the group need to be related to each other. Performers of all ages are eligible to apply.
