= Doireann Ní Ghlacáin =

Irish fiddler and singer, and media presenter

- Born: 1993/1994 (age 32–33); Clontarf, County Dublin, Ireland
- Relatives: Seán Ó Riada (maternal grandfather) Liadh Ní Riada (maternal aunt) Paddy Glackin (paternal uncle)

Doireann Ní Ghlacáin, sometimes Doireann Glackin (born 1993/1994), is an Irish fiddler and sean-nós singer, academic and TV, radio and podcast presenter.

== Early life and education ==
Doireann Glackin, later commonly billed as Ní Ghlacáin, grew up in Clontarf, a Northside suburb of Dublin, the eldest of three children. Her father, Kevin Glackin, is a retired garda, and teacher of fiddle playing, and her mother, Sorcha Ní Riada, political correspondent for TG4. Her paternal uncle is traditional musician Paddy Glackin and her maternal grandfather was the composer Seán Ó Riada.

Ní Ghlacáin received her primary education at Scoil Neasáin, a Gaelscoil in Harmonstown, before attending Coláiste Íosagáin, Booterstown. She was taught to play the fiddle by her father. She completed a bachelor's degree in Philosophy and the Irish Language at the University of Galway and later pursued studies of the oral tradition in Irish at Masters level, and in 2024, secured a doctorate on aspects of the oral poetry of the Múscraí Gaeltacht, County Cork.

== Career ==
Ní Ghlacáin was pursuing PhD studies when, at the age of 22, she was invited to work for TG4. She has since presented on radio and television, with RTÉ Radio 1, TG4, and RTÉ Television. She presented Gradam Ceol and Tradfest in 2018 on TG4.She co-wrote and presented the documentary Seán Ó Riada - Mo Sheanathair in 2021, exploring the life and works of her grandfather, Seán Ó Riada, who had died long before her birth. As of 2025, she was the host of RTÉ TV series Tracks and Trails.

In 2019, as Doireann Glackin, she released a 13-track joint album with concertina player Sarah Flynn, The Housekeepers; the research for the album and its release attracted Arts Council funding.

In 2023, Ní Ghlacáin, Louise Cantillon and Síomha Ní Ruairc launched the bilingual podcast How to Gael, which they continue to co-host, with the three having met while working at TG4. The podcast led to a live touring show, beginning at the Liberty Hall Theatre in April 2024.

In late 2025, Ní Ghlacáin toured Ireland with a one-woman show of music and bilingual storytelling about the Cailleach. In late 2026, she announced the release of a single, with her first solo album to follow in January 2027.

== Personal life ==
As of the early 2020s, Ní Ghlacáin was living on a farm in Ennis, County Clare, with her partner for most of her 20s, a musician and farmer, and stated that she lived 70% of her life through Irish. As of 2025, she described herself as newly single, since a week after her 30th birthday.
