= Ivan Yates =

Irish former politician (born 1959)

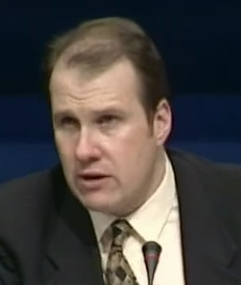
- Yates in 1996

Minister for Agriculture, Food and Forestry
- In office 15 December 1994 – 26 June 1997
- Taoiseach: John Bruton
- Preceded by: Joe Walsh
- Succeeded by: Joe Walsh

Teachta Dála
- In office June 1981 – May 2002
- Constituency: Wexford

Personal details
- Born: 23 October 1959 (age 66) Enniscorthy, County Wexford, Ireland
- Party: Fine Gael
- Spouse: Deirdre Yates (m. 1985)
- Children: 4
- Education: University College Dublin

Ivan Yates (born 23 October 1959) is an Irish broadcaster, businessman and former politician. He was elected as a Fine Gael Teachta Dála (TD) for the Wexford constituency at the 1981 general election and at each election until his retirement from politics in 2002. He also served as Minister for Agriculture, Food and Forestry from 1994 to 1997. Since 2009, Yates has been active as a political commentator.

== Early life ==
Yates was born in Enniscorthy, County Wexford. He was educated at Aravon School, Bray; St. Columba's Church of Ireland College in Rathfarnham, Dublin; and Gurteen College, County Tipperary.

== Political career ==
=== Local politics ===
Yates first gained political office in 1978 at the age of 18 when he secured a seat on Enniscorthy Urban Council as a member of Fine Gael, capturing the post by just 13 votes.

=== National politics ===
When he was first elected to the Dáil in 1981, Yates was the youngest member of the 22nd Dáil and is also the fifth-youngest ever member of Dáil Éireann at the age of 21. He became involved in local politics when he became a member of Wexford County Council, serving until 1995 and again from 1999 to 2004. He joined the Fine Gael front bench in 1988 and was appointed Minister for Agriculture, Food and Forestry when the party came to power in 1994.

Yates oversaw a particularly difficult period for Irish agriculture. Farmers saw the prices they received for their produce plummet; he stopped live animal exports in response to controversy over cruelty in shipping, and took on the Irish Veterinary Union over the tuberculosis eradication scheme. He also had to deal with a sharp rise in the number of BSE cases during 1996, and the consequent banning of Irish beef by Russia. When John Bruton resigned as leader of Fine Gael in January 2001, there was much speculation that Yates would be a contender for the vacant position. Instead, he announced to his colleagues that he was leaving full-time politics to concentrate on his family and business interests and that he would not be contesting the next general election.

He receives annual pension payments of €74,836 from his time in politics.

In October 2025, during the Irish presidential election, Yates attracted controversy when he said that if Fine Gael contacted him for advice, he would tell them to "smear the bejaysus out of" opponent Catherine Connolly. By that point in the campaign, Humphreys' campaign was lagging badly behind Connolly's (who would go on to win the election). Catherine Connolly described the comment as "absolutely shocked" and treated it as evidence of a hostile campaign tone, while Humphreys publicly distanced herself, saying "Ivan Yates has nothing to do with my campaign". Yates later rejected attempts to tie the remark to active campaigning, calling the reaction "all BS" and saying he was an analyst and pundit rather than a campaign operative. However, it later emerged in November 2025 that Yates had been involved with Jim Gavin's campaign in the same election.

== Business career ==
Yates was the chairman and managing director of Celtic Bookmakers, an Irish chain of betting shops, and expanded the company from its Wexford base to a chain of 64 shops around the country at its peak. On 4 January 2011, it was announced that the company had gone into receivership.

He headed a group of bookmakers in a court case against the British Horseracing Board (BHB) over fees for licences to access a racing information database in 2005. The issue was resolved in the High Court with the termination of the BHB's licence agreement and a payment of €300,000 to the bookmakers, who were reported to have access to the BHB's former database until 9 January 2006.

In 2011, he described the Irish bankruptcy process as "purgatory", and publicly announced that he was contemplating moving to the UK to avail of the British bankruptcy process.

On 21 August 2012, the High Court in Dublin dismissed an attempt by Allied Irish Banks to have him declared bankrupt.

In September 2013, it was announced that Yates was discharged from bankruptcy, having fulfilled the requirements set down by Swansea County Court, where he made his application for personal insolvency on 24 August 2012.

== Media work ==
Yates co-presented the Newstalk breakfast show from 2009, firstly with Claire Byrne and subsequently with Chris Donoghue. On 23 March 2012, he announced he would be leaving both the station and his column in the Irish Examiner with effect from 6 April 2012, to concentrate on his personal finances. He also presented Tonight with Vincent Browne on TV3 during summer 2011.

He returned to Newstalk in September 2013, once again co-presenting the breakfast show with Chris Donoghue.

Yates is a regular conference speaker, motivational speaker and MC at business events in Ireland. He is a client of Noel Kelly, of NK Management.

Yates co-hosted The Tonight Show on TV3 and presented The Hard Shoulder on Newstalk until his retirement from broadcasting in July 2020. Kieran Cuddihy replaced Yates as the host of The Hard Shoulder in September 2020. In 2025 Yates was dropped from the Path to Power podcast which he had co-hosted with Matt Cooper, this occurred after revelations that Yates had coached the Fianna Fáil candidate, Jim Gavin, in that years presidential election. Yates never disclosed this to his audience, his co-host, or the producers of the podcast.

=== Path to Power podcast ===
In December 2023, Yates began appearing on the political analysis podcast Path to Power alongside journalist Matt Cooper.

=== Failure to disclose involvement in Jim Gavin campaign during the 2025 Irish presidential election ===
In October 2025, Ivan Yates was cut from the Path to Power podcast following revelations that he had privately assisted Fianna Fáil’s candidate Jim Gavin during the 2025 Irish presidential election. The disclosure, first reported by The Irish Independent, revealed that Yates, a former Fine Gael minister, had coached Gavin for the first televised debate. Podcast co-producer and co-host Matt Cooper said he had been "gobsmacked" and "quite shocked" to learn of Yates’s involvement, describing it as "a complete revelation". He told TheJournal.ie that after the shock subsided, "I suppose then I went to being a bit angry about it".

Cooper said Yates’s undisclosed work amounted to "a very serious omission", adding: "You can’t talk about a candidate's performance without disclosing that you have also been involved in the preparation for those performances, can you?". Cooper argued that "transparency in something as important as a presidential election race was absolutely essential". Both Cooper and NK Productions, which produced the show, confirmed that Yates’s role as co-host had been ended "with immediate effect", stating that neither had been aware of his work with Fianna Fáil. They said Yates "should have shared" that information with them and the audience. Cooper noted that "had he shared that information with us, we would have made sure that our audience was aware of the matter when we were discussing the election". The Path to Power podcast is planned to continue without Yates, who will be replaced by rotating guest hosts alongside Cooper.

Yates faced further scrutiny when it emerged he had also acted as a stand-in presenter on Newstalk during three days of the presidential campaign without disclosing any potential conflict of interest. On 2 November, Newstalk confirmed the matter was under review, noting that Yates had not informed the station of his involvement with Fianna Fáil. Meanwhile, RTÉ stated that Yates had not contributed to their coverage during the official election period but that his advisory role should have been disclosed to audiences. Questions were raised about Fianna Fáil’s awareness of his work, with former Fine Gael minister Alan Shatter and Minister of State Colm Brophy calling for clarification and suggesting that broadcasting fairness and impartiality regulations may require review.

=== Persona ===
Reviewing Yates' media persona in 2018, Mick Heaney of the Irish Times summarised that while Yates presents himself as a quippy right-wing "Liberal-baiter", his tendency is to interview left-leaning guests and eventually concede to their points or praise them after being initially sceptical of their view. Heaney suggested that Yates is more interested in challenging political orthodoxy in Ireland than being an ideologue.

== Political views ==
Speaking in 2010, Yates recalled how he decided which Irish political party he would choose to join in the late 1970s; Yates stated he wasn't a socialist, so that ruled out the Labour Party, and he didn't feel a deep connection to the Easter Rising of 1916, so that ruled out Fianna Fáil. That left Yates with Fine Gael. Yates was considered to be a part of the emerging liberal wing of the party which was being spearheaded by Garret FitzGerald.

In 2025 Yates identifies as centre-right and has stated that Ronald Reagan and Margaret Thatcher are his ideological guiding lights. Yates stated he is supportive to the American Republican Party and Donald Trump, although he disagreed with Trump's economic policies such as the use of tariffs.

Detached from Irish nationalism, Yates has quipped that he is "rightly condemned as West British" and doesn't care for Irish republicanism. In 2024 Yates stated he has no interest in learning the Irish language and felt too many resources are spent by the Irish state towards the upkeep of the language.

== Personal life ==
Yates is a member of the Church of Ireland. He is married to Deirdre (whom he credits for his success in multiple professions), and they have three children.

Political offices
Preceded by Joe Walsh	Minister for Agriculture, Food and Forestry; 1994–1997	Succeeded by Joe Walsh
Honorary titles
Preceded by Myra Barry	Baby of the Dáil; 1981–1984	Succeeded by Brian Cowen

Dáil	Election	Deputy (Party)	Deputy (Party)	Deputy (Party)	Deputy (Party)	Deputy (Party)
2nd	1921	Richard Corish (SF)	James Ryan (SF)	Séamus Doyle (SF)	Seán Etchingham (SF)	4 seats 1921–1923
3rd	1922	Richard Corish (Lab)	Daniel O'Callaghan (Lab)	Séamus Doyle (AT-SF)	Michael Doyle (FP)	4 seats 1921–1923
4th	1923	Richard Corish (Lab)	James Ryan (Rep)	Robert Lambert (Rep)	Michael Doyle (FP)	Osmond Esmonde (CnaG)
5th	1927 (Jun)	Richard Corish (Lab)	James Ryan (FF)	James Shannon (Lab)	Michael Doyle (FP)	John Keating (NL)
6th	1927 (Sep)	Richard Corish (Lab)	James Ryan (FF)	Denis Allen (FF)	Michael Jordan (FP)	Osmond Esmonde (CnaG)
7th	1932	Richard Corish (Lab)	James Ryan (FF)	Denis Allen (FF)	John Keating (CnaG)	Osmond Esmonde (CnaG)
8th	1933	Richard Corish (Lab)	James Ryan (FF)	Patrick Kehoe (FF)	John Keating (CnaG)	Osmond Esmonde (CnaG)
8th	1936 by-election	Richard Corish (Lab)	James Ryan (FF)	Patrick Kehoe (FF)	John Keating (CnaG)	Denis Allen (FF)
9th	1937	Richard Corish (Lab)	James Ryan (FF)	John Keating (FG)	John Esmonde (FG)	Denis Allen (FF)
10th	1938	Richard Corish (Lab)	James Ryan (FF)	John Keating (FG)	John Esmonde (FG)	Denis Allen (FF)
11th	1943	Richard Corish (Lab)	James Ryan (FF)	John O'Leary (Lab)	John Esmonde (FG)	Denis Allen (FF)
12th	1944	Richard Corish (Lab)	James Ryan (FF)	John O'Leary (NLP)	John Keating (FG)	Denis Allen (FF)
12th	1945 by-election	Brendan Corish (Lab)	James Ryan (FF)	John O'Leary (NLP)	John Keating (FG)	Denis Allen (FF)
13th	1948	Brendan Corish (Lab)	James Ryan (FF)	John O'Leary (NLP)	John Esmonde (FG)	Denis Allen (FF)
14th	1951	Brendan Corish (Lab)	James Ryan (FF)	John O'Leary (Lab)	Anthony Esmonde (FG)	Denis Allen (FF)
15th	1954	Brendan Corish (Lab)	James Ryan (FF)	John O'Leary (Lab)	Anthony Esmonde (FG)	Denis Allen (FF)
16th	1957	Brendan Corish (Lab)	James Ryan (FF)	Seán Browne (FF)	Anthony Esmonde (FG)	Denis Allen (FF)
17th	1961	Brendan Corish (Lab)	James Ryan (FF)	Lorcan Allen (FF)	Anthony Esmonde (FG)	4 seats 1961–1981
18th	1965	Brendan Corish (Lab)	James Kennedy (FF)	Lorcan Allen (FF)	Anthony Esmonde (FG)	4 seats 1961–1981
19th	1969	Brendan Corish (Lab)	Seán Browne (FF)	Lorcan Allen (FF)	Anthony Esmonde (FG)	4 seats 1961–1981
20th	1973	Brendan Corish (Lab)	Seán Browne (FF)	Lorcan Allen (FF)	John Esmonde (FG)	4 seats 1961–1981
21st	1977	Brendan Corish (Lab)	Seán Browne (FF)	Lorcan Allen (FF)	Michael D'Arcy (FG)	4 seats 1961–1981
22nd	1981	Brendan Corish (Lab)	Ivan Yates (FG)	Lorcan Allen (FF)	Michael D'Arcy (FG)	Hugh Byrne (FF)
23rd	1982 (Feb)	Seán Browne (FF)	Ivan Yates (FG)	Lorcan Allen (FF)	Michael D'Arcy (FG)	Hugh Byrne (FF)
24th	1982 (Nov)	Avril Doyle (FG)	Ivan Yates (FG)	John Browne (FF)	Michael D'Arcy (FG)	Hugh Byrne (FF)
25th	1987	Avril Doyle (FG)	Ivan Yates (FG)	John Browne (FF)	Brendan Howlin (Lab)	Hugh Byrne (FF)
26th	1989	Michael D'Arcy (FG)	Ivan Yates (FG)	John Browne (FF)	Brendan Howlin (Lab)	Séamus Cullimore (FF)
27th	1992	Avril Doyle (FG)	Ivan Yates (FG)	John Browne (FF)	Brendan Howlin (Lab)	Hugh Byrne (FF)
28th	1997	Michael D'Arcy (FG)	Ivan Yates (FG)	John Browne (FF)	Brendan Howlin (Lab)	Hugh Byrne (FF)
29th	2002	Paul Kehoe (FG)	Liam Twomey (Ind.)	John Browne (FF)	Brendan Howlin (Lab)	Tony Dempsey (FF)
30th	2007	Paul Kehoe (FG)	Michael W. D'Arcy (FG)	John Browne (FF)	Brendan Howlin (Lab)	Seán Connick (FF)
31st	2011	Paul Kehoe (FG)	Liam Twomey (FG)	John Browne (FF)	Brendan Howlin (Lab)	Mick Wallace (Ind.)
32nd	2016	Paul Kehoe (FG)	Michael W. D'Arcy (FG)	James Browne (FF)	Brendan Howlin (Lab)	Mick Wallace (I4C)
32nd	2019 by-election	Paul Kehoe (FG)	Michael W. D'Arcy (FG)	James Browne (FF)	Brendan Howlin (Lab)	Malcolm Byrne (FF)
33rd	2020	Paul Kehoe (FG)	Verona Murphy (Ind.)	James Browne (FF)	Brendan Howlin (Lab)	Johnny Mythen (SF)
34th	2024	4 seats since 2024	Verona Murphy (Ind.)	James Browne (FF)	George Lawlor (Lab)	Johnny Mythen (SF)
