= Síomha Ní Ruairc =

Irish language advocate, television presenter and podcaster

Síomha Emily Ní Ruairc is an Irish language advocate, television presenter and podcaster. In addition to a full-time job at Conradh na Gaeilge, she hosts programmes for Virgin Media Ireland and TG4. She was for two years one of the main presenters of Ireland AM, Ireland’s most watched breakfast television programme, and co-founded and co-hosts the How to Gael podcast.

== Early life ==
Síomha Emily Ní Ruairc was born in Galway, the middle child of three girls, and brought up in Lucan, a western satellite town of Dublin, Ireland. She was brought up in a bilingual environment, with Irish spoken at home throughout her childhood.

Ní Ruairc started at Conradh na Gaeilge directly from college, and worked as a Youth Coordinator as well as with the TechSpace digital media programme.

== Broadcasting career ==
Ní Ruairc began her on screen career in 2018, hosting An Ríl Deal and Réalta Agus Gaolta on TG4. She continues to present these series annually.

In 2023, Ní Ruairc produced and presented an investigative documentary titled ‘Síomha: Idir Anam Is Corp’ (Síomha: Body and Soul). This aired on TG4 and the focus of documentary saw Ní Ruairc delve into the root of body issues experienced by women and young girls. Later on that year, Ní Ruairc presented Virgin Media's new Irish language dating show 'Grá Ar An Trá'. The series was a success and a second season was set to shoot in the summer of 2024.

In autumn 2023, Ní Ruairc was announced as a presenter on Ireland AM, the country’s most-watched morning television show. In September 2025, she announced that she was stepping back from the role due to overall workload.

== Podcast ==
Ní Ruairc co-hosts bilingual podcast 'How To Gael' with Louise Cantillon and Doireann Ní Ghlacáin. The hosts tackle various topics, with the conversations transitioning between Gaeilge (Irish) and English. 'How to Gael' is Ireland's number one bilingual podcast.

== Personal life ==
In 2020, Ní Ruairc proposed to her partner, former UFC fighter and actor Cathal Pendred, and they married in June 2024. Their first child was announced mid-2025, the same year one of her sisters died, and a daughter was born in early 2026.
