= David Wills =

David Wills may refer to:

- Dave Wills (baseball) (1877–1959), Major League Baseball first baseman
- David Wills (Gettysburg) (1831–1894), instigator of the Gettysburg National Cemetery and Lincoln's Gettysburg Address
- David Wills (singer) (born 1951), American country music singer-songwriter
- Dave Wills (sportscaster) (1964–2023), American sportscaster; radio voice of the Tampa Bay Rays
- David Wills (voice actor) (born 1970), American voice actor
- David Wills (writer) (born 1953), American professor of French and translator; author of Prosthesis
- David Wills (born 1954), American musician, co-founder of the band Negativland
- Sir David Wills (1917–1999), English soldier and philanthropist, creator of the Ditchley Foundation

== See also ==
- David Willis (disambiguation)
