= Dennis Rodman's Big Bang in Pyongyang =

2015 documentary film

- Film poster
- Directed by: Colin Offland
- Screenplay by: Matthew Baker
- Story by: Colin Offland
- Produced by: Colin Offland
- Starring: Dennis Rodman; Matt Cooper
- Narrated by: Matt Cooper
- Cinematography: Jason Bulley
- Edited by: Tom O'Flaherty
- Music by: Ben Blease; Adam Ryan-Carter
- Production company: Chief Productions
- Distributed by: Journeyman Pictures
- Release date: 25 January 2015 (Slamdance Film Festival)
- Running time: 95 minutes
- Country: United Kingdom
- Language: English

Dennis Rodman's Big Bang in Pyongyang is a 2015 British documentary film produced and directed by Colin Offland, written by Matthew Baker, and narrated by Matt Cooper. The film follows retired professional basketball player Dennis Rodman on his mission to host a basketball game between American former basketball stars and the North Korea national team in Pyongyang. The film is Colin Offland's feature directorial debut.

== Content ==
The documentary film follows Dennis Rodman's third trip to North Korea, financed by Paddy Power. Rodman and other former NBA players such as Doug Christie, Cliff Robinson, Charles Smith, Vin Baker, and Kenny Anderson among others, with Sleepy Floyd as head coach, head to Pyongyang to play an exhibition basketball game for Kim Jong Un's birthday. The American players are soundly defeated by the North Korea men's national basketball team.

In the film, Rodman behaves in inappropriate ways, such as yelling at an interviewer, getting too drunk to practice with his teammates, yelling at his dinner companions at a state banquet, and having a mental breakdown on camera. After the game, Kim Jong Un invites Rodman to spend time with him at a ski resort, but cancels the meeting after Rodman goes on a drinking binge.

The film is narrated by Matt Cooper, who also traveled to Pyongyang for the documentary, and later stated that he was genuinely afraid of being detained by North Korean authorities when Rodman yelled at him during a dinner. The trip to North Korea was denounced by both the National Basketball Association and the National Basketball Retired Players Association, and the NBA did not allow the filmmakers to use any archival footage of Rodman because they wanted to avoid association.

== Release ==
The film premiered at the Slamdance Film Festival on 25 January 2015. It was also screened at the Manchester Film Festival in March 2016. The film had its television premiere on 26 June 2015 on Showtime.

== Reception ==
The film saw negative reception. The Guardian described the film as a tragicomedy, and Salon said that in the film, Rodman is "clearly disturbed, either by illness or addiction". Uproxx said that "the entire second half of the movie is like a slow-motion car crash", and that the film is "funny, sad, surreal, terrifying, and ultimately makes you wonder how things could be different". Variety said that Rodman's mood swings were deeply upsetting and that the film was like "watching the efforts of a bomb-disposal squad".

Multiple reviewers called attention to a scene in which Rodman drunkenly sings "Happy Birthday to You" to Kim Jong Un before the basketball game in front of thousands of spectators. Variety described the event as "uproariously funny", while Uproxx compared Rodman's singing to "some hellish reincarnation of Marilyn Monroe", further saying that the film was "worth it for just that one incredible image".

== See also ==
- A State of Mind, a North Korean gymnastics documentary film
- The Game of Their Lives, a North Korean football documentary film
