= Matt Cooper (Irish journalist) =

Irish author and broadcaster (born 1966)

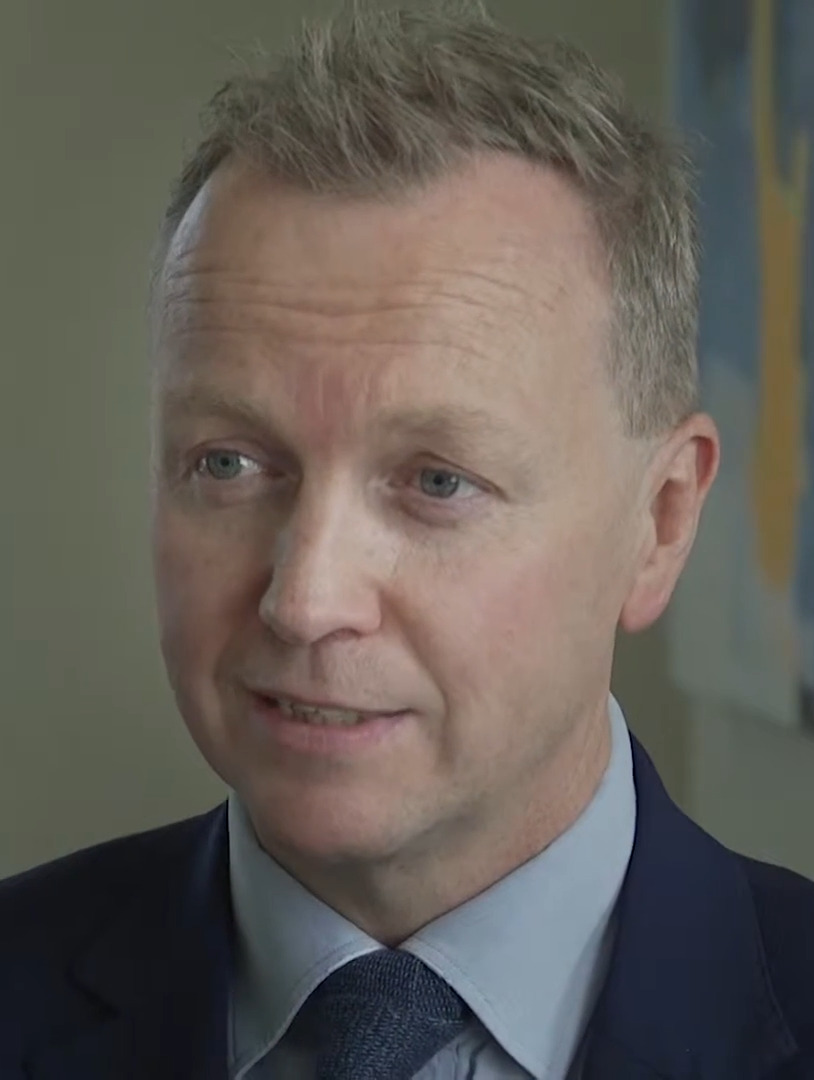
- Cooper in 2015
- Born: 21 July 1966 (age 59); Cork, Ireland
- Education: University College Cork; Dublin City University
- Occupations: Journalist; Radio/TV presenter; author
- Employer: Today FM
- Agent: Noel Kelly
- Notable credit: The Last Word
- Spouse: Aileen Hickey (m. 1995)
- Children: 5

Matt Cooper (born 21 July 1966) is an Irish journalist, author and broadcaster who presents news review show The Last Word on Today FM.

Cooper is a former editor of the Sunday Tribune and former business editor of the Irish Independent. He has also done some television work.

== Early life ==
Cooper was born in Cork in 1966 and was educated at the North Monastery school and later at University College Cork.

Cooper played rugby with Sunday's Well and later captained the under-20s team. He also played Gaelic football and hurling for the Bishopstown GAA club.

== Career ==
Cooper is a client of Noel Kelly, of NK Management.

=== Journalism ===
Cooper is a former editor of the Sunday Tribune, appointed in September 1996, as well as a former business editor of the Irish Independent. Then aged 30, he was the youngest person in Ireland to be appointed an editor of a national newspaper. Cooper was awarded Business Journalist of the Year in 1992 and 1999 and also National Journalist of the Year in 1993 and 2001. He is a graduate of Dublin City University.

=== The Last Word ===
Cooper presents the news review show The Last Word on Today FM from 16:30 to 19:00 every weekday. In 2008, he spent hours recreating the iconic picture used for the cover of Abbey Road to publicise Today FM's move across the River Liffey only to admit "I'm not really a Beatles fan. Maybe I'm just a little bit too young or something". Cooper writes a weekly column for the Irish Examiner and one for the Irish edition of The Sunday Times newspaper.

In 2011, Kim Bielenberg said in the Irish Independent that Cooper would make a worthy replacement for Pat Kenny at RTÉ with Kenny in the "autumn of his career". Bielenberg also said Cooper was "never going to be the next Graham Norton".

=== Television work ===
Cooper was a frequent host of live UEFA Champions League coverage on TV3. He has also hosted live rugby and GAA matches on the same channel.

To coincide with the 100-year anniversary of Battle of the Somme in July 2016, Cooper narrated the RTE documentary Heroes Of The Somme, which uncovered the stories of some of the men that won The Victoria Cross fighting there.

From 2017 to 2021, Cooper co-hosted The Tonight Show on Virgin Media One with Ivan Yates.

=== Writings ===
Cooper's book, Who Really Runs Ireland, was published in 2009. It examines Irish businessmen and politicians and their relationships.

- Who Really Runs Ireland? (2010)
- How Ireland Really Went Bust (2011)

In 2015, a biography of Tony O'Reilly titled The Maximalist: The Rise and Fall of Tony O'Reilly, was published by Gill and Macmillan.

=== Visit to North Korea ===
In January 2014, Cooper secretly accompanied Dennis Rodman to North Korea for Kim Jong-un's big birthday basketball game. His cover was blown when they were seen together on Sky News at an airport in Beijing. Today FM confirmed Cooper's presence in North Korea and that he would meet Kim Jong-un while there. A documentary was filmed based on Rodman's trip and the basketball game he organised versus North Korea; entitled Dennis Rodman's Big Bang in Pyongyang, it received a cinematic release in July 2015 and featured narration by Cooper, who also featured extensively in the film.

== Personal life ==
Copper has been married to fellow County Cork native Aileen Hickey since 1995. The couple have 5 children, 3 daughters and 2 sons.
