= The Last Word (radio show) =

Irish radio news review show

The Last Word is an Irish radio news review show hosted by Matt Cooper on Today FM on weekday evenings between 4:30pm and 7pm.

It is produced by Patrick Haughey and includes regular contributions from American conservative commentator Cal Thomas.

An hour-long weekend edition, called The Best of The Last Word formerly (The Very Last Word) airs on Saturday and Sunday early mornings (12:00AM) featuring highlights from the weekday programmes, is broadcast each Saturday morning at 7am.

Eamon Dunphy originally hosted the show but stepped down in November 2002. The then Sunday Tribune editor Matt Cooper replaced him. Kevin Myers was a regular stand-in presenter in the early years of the show.

David Norris gave his first full interview to the programme after announcing his withdrawal from the 2011 Irish presidential election. The show also had a debate with the candidates, including Norris when he re-entered the race.
