= An Ríl Deal =

Irish dancing television show

An Ríl Deal is a traditional Irish dancing television show on the Irish television channel TG4 that has been described as "Ireland's answer to Strictly Come Dancing". It is judged by a trio of judges (for a period, Breandán De Gallaí, Sibéal Davitt and Roy Galvin) and is run as a competition, with the winner getting to donate €5,000 towards a charity of their choice. In 2017, the winner was sent to New York City, USA to perform one night on Broadway.

Notable participants since its inception in 2016 include; Ailbhe Liu and Seoda Wang, Ronan O'Connell, Robyn Caffrey, Caitlin Clarke, Youcef Belouazani, and the Newry based dance group Jig Jazz.

The programme has been presented since 2018 by Síomha Ní Ruairc.
