= First Dates (Australian TV series) =

Australian TV series

- First Dates promotional title card for series 1 to 4
- Genre: Reality
- Narrated by: Sam Mac (season 1–4); Tommy Little (season 5)
- Country of origin: Australia
- Original language: English
- No. of series: 6
- No. of episodes: 57

Production
- Executive producer: Geraldine Orrock
- Running time: 42–56 minutes
- Production company: Warner Bros. International Television Production

Original release
- Network: Seven Network (2016–20, 2026)
- Release: 3 February 2016 – 11 March 2020; 23 June 2026
- Network: Network 10
- Release: 24 February – 28 May 2022

Related
- First Dates UK; First Dates Ireland

First Dates is an Australian reality dating television show. The format is based on a British program of the same name. The first four seasons previously aired on Seven Network and were narrated by Sam Mac. The fifth season aired on Network 10 and was narrated by Tommy Little. The sixth season is set to return to Seven in 2026.

== Premise ==
The program follows two strangers, who have been matched up by a relationship expert, meeting for a first date at a restaurant in Sydney. At the end of the date, the couples are interviewed together and asked whether they would like to see each other again.

During filming of the date, there are no producers or cameramen in the restaurant, to ensure the "authenticity of the date," with cameras being remotely operated.

== Broadcast ==
The eight episode first season premiered on the Seven Network on 3 February 2016 airing on Wednesday at 9 pm. The second season premiered on 1 November 2016, with six episodes airing on either Tuesday or Wednesday at 7:30 pm. The remaining two episodes of the season aired on 10 and 11 April 2017. In May 2017, the series was renewed for a third season. The series was renewed for a fourth season which aired in 2018.

The series was cancelled by Seven in October 2020. However casting for a fifth season was announced, with the series confirmed to be switching to Network 10. Applications closed on 1 November 2021. The fifth season (and the first for 10) began airing from 24 February 2022. In August 2023, it was originally announced the series would return to Seven in 2024, after only one season on 10. However, the series was pushed backed to 2025 and announced it’s been pushed back again to 2026. The first promo for the sixth series aired in June 2026. The series will return on 23 June 2026.

=== United Kingdom ===
In June 2016, the series began broadcasting in the United Kingdom under the title First Dates Abroad on E4.

== Episodes ==
| Series | Episodes | Originally released | | |
| Series | Episodes | First released | Last released | Network |
|---|---|---|---|---|
| 1 | 8 | 3 February 2016 | 23 March 2016 | Seven Network |
| 2 | 12 | 1 November 2016 | 27 June 2017 | Seven Network |
| 3 | 12 | 12 September 2017 | 16 July 2018 | Seven Network |
| 4 | 8 | 28 January 2020 | 11 March 2020 | Seven Network |
| 5 | 12 | 24 February 2022 | 18 May 2022 | Network 10 |
| 6 | TBA | 23 June 2026 | TBA | Seven Network |

=== Season 1 (2016) ===
| No. overall | No. in season | Title | Original release date | Australian viewers |
|---|---|---|---|---|
| 1 | 1 | Episode One | 3 February 2016 | 921,000 |
| 2 | 2 | Episode Two | 10 February 2016 | 945,000 |
| 3 | 3 | Episode Three | 17 February 2016 | 1,039,000 |
| 4 | 4 | Episode Four | 24 February 2016 | 816,000 |
| 5 | 5 | Episode Five | 2 March 2016 | 828,000 |
| 6 | 6 | Episode Six | 9 March 2016 | 849,000 |
| 7 | 7 | Episode Seven | 16 March 2016 | 814,000 |
| 8 | 8 | Episode Eight | 23 March 2016 | 750,000 |

=== Season 2 (2016–2017) ===
| No. overall | No. in season | Title | Original release date | Australian viewers |
|---|---|---|---|---|
| 9 | 1 | Episode One | 1 November 2016 | 839,000 |
| 10 | 2 | Episode Two | 8 November 2016 | 914,000 |
| 11 | 3 | Episode Three | 15 November 2016 | 865,000 |
| 12 | 4 | Episode Four | 16 November 2016 | 824,000 |
| 13 | 5 | Episode Five | 22 November 2016 | 825,000 |
| 14 | 6 | Episode Six | 23 November 2016 | 736,000 |
| 15 | 7 | Episode Seven | 10 April 2017 | 747,000 |
| 16 | 8 | Episode Eight | 11 April 2017 | 707,000 |
| 17 | 9 | Episode Nine | 6 June 2017 | 630,000 |
| 18 | 10 | Episode Ten | 13 June 2017 | 595,000 |
| 19 | 11 | Episode Eleven | 20 June 2017 | 672,000 |
| 20 | 12 | Episode Twelve | 27 June 2017 | 628,000 |

=== Season 3 (2017–2018) ===
| No. overall | No. in season | Title | Original release date | Australian viewers |
|---|---|---|---|---|
| 21 | 1 | Episode One | 12 September 2017 | 741,000 |
| 22 | 2 | Episode Two | 19 September 2017 | 652,000 |
| 23 | 3 | Episode Three | 26 September 2017 | 592,000 |
| 24 | 4 | Episode Four | 3 October 2017 | 568,000 |
| 25 | 5 | Episode Five | 10 October 2017 | 531,000 |
| 26 | 6 | Episode Six | 24 October 2017 | 618,000 |
| 27 | 7 | Episode Seven | 1 November 2017 | 610,000 |
| 28 | 8 | Episode Eight | 18 June 2018 | N/A |
| 29 | 9 | Episode Nine | 25 June 2018 | N/A |
| 30 | 10 | Episode Ten | 2 July 2018 | N/A |
| 31 | 11 | Episode Eleven | 9 July 2018 | N/A |
| 32 | 12 | Episode Twelve | 16 July 2018 | N/A |

=== Season 4 (2020) ===
| No. overall | No. in season | Title | Original release date | Australian viewers |
|---|---|---|---|---|
| 33 | 1 | Episode One | 28 January 2020 | 372,000 |
| 34 | 2 | Episode Two | 29 January 2020 | 370,000 |
| 35 | 3 | Episode Three | 5 February 2020 | 379,000 |
| 36 | 4 | Episode Four | 12 February 2020 | 408,000 |
| 37 | 5 | Episode Five | 19 February 2020 | 329,000 |
| 38 | 6 | Episode Six | 26 February 2020 | 355,000 |
| 39 | 7 | Episode Seven | 4 March 2020 | 402,000 |
| 40 | 8 | Episode Eight | 11 March 2020 | 379,000 |

=== Season 5 (2022) ===
| No. overall | No. in season | Title | Original release date | Australian viewers |
|---|---|---|---|---|
| 41 | 1 | Episode One | 24 February 2022 | 334,000 |
| 42 | 2 | Episode Two | 3 March 2022 | 374,000 |
| 43 | 3 | Episode Three | 10 March 2022 | 402,000 |
| 44 | 4 | Episode Four | 17 March 2022 | 375,000 |
| 45 | 5 | Episode Five | 31 March 2022 | 314,000 |
| 46 | 6 | Episode Six | 7 April 2022 | 337,000 |
| 47 | 7 | Episode Seven | 14 April 2022 | 269,000 |
| 48 | 8 | Episode Eight | 20 April 2022 | N/A |
| 49 | 9 | Episode Nine | 27 April 2022 | N/A |
| 50 | 10 | Episode Ten | 4 May 2022 | N/A |
| 51 | 11 | Episode Eleven | 11 May 2022 | N/A |
| 52 | 12 | Episode Twelve | 18 May 2022 | N/A |

=== Season 6 (2026) ===
| No. overall | No. in season | Title | Original release date | Australian viewers (Total) |
|---|---|---|---|---|
| 53 | 1 | Episode One | 23 June 2026 | 560,000 |
| 54 | 2 | Episode Two | 30 June 2026 | 531,000 |
| 55 | 3 | Episode Three | 7 July 2026 | 547,000 |
| 56 | 4 | Episode Four | 14 July 2026 | 554,000 |
| 57 | 5 | Episode Five | 21 July 2026 | 502,000 |
| 58 | 6 | Episode Six | 1 September 2026 | 426,000 |
| 59 | 7 | Episode Seven | 8 September 2026 | 505,000 |
| 60 | 8 | Episode Eight | 15 September 2026 | 456,000 |
| 61 | 9 | Episode Nine | 22 September 2026 | 496,000 |
