= Sibéal Davitt =

Irish sean-nós dancer, choreographer and bilingual broadcaster

- Born: c. 1989; Dublin
- Education: Trinity College Dublin, University of Limerick
- Website: sibealdavitt.com

Sibéal Davitt is an Irish sean-nós dancer, choreographer and bilingual broadcaster.

== Biography ==
Davitt finished secondary school in 2007. She joined CoisCéim Dance Theatre's youth dance company Creative Steps while she studied for a degree at Trinity College, Dublin and gained a TV following when she won 'Glas Vegas' on TG4 which allowed her to travel to Las Vegas to dance for international talent agents in 2009. She completed a masters in Contemporary Dance at the University of Limerick in 2014. Since then she has been creating, choreographing and performing in a wide number of events in Ireland and abroad. She has had commissions in Dublin and Marseille and worked with Kristyn Fontanella and Olwyn Lyons. In August 2019 Davitt was the choreographer for the Veronica Coburn directed production of Ask Too Much Of Me in the Abbey Theatre, Dublin.

Working with Gavin Fitzgerald, Davitt won the Fingal Film Festival 2014 Best Irish Language film and appeared on an Irish language Leaving Cert question the same year. In 2014 Davitt was awarded the Arts Council’s Traditional Arts Bursary. Davitt was awarded one of the inaugural Markievicz Award's in 2019. In 2020 she is the Associate Artist with Dance Ireland.
