= Sex, Love & Goop =

Sex, Love & Goop is a 2021 reality television docuseries hosted by Gwyneth Paltrow. The show follows couples as they work with intimate wellness professionals to improve their relationships.
