= First Dates (Canadian TV series) =

- Genre: Reality
- Country of origin: Canada
- Original language: English
- No. of series: 2
- No. of episodes: 30

Production
- Running time: 30 minutes (inc. adverts)

Original release
- Network: Slice
- Release: 2015 – 2017

First Dates Canada is the Canadian version of the international reality television series First Dates.

It follows people who meet for a blind date in an upscale restaurant in Vancouver's Gastown neighbourhood equipped with over 40 remote cameras, filming multiple dates simultaneously. The dates last for as long as two hours and are edited for episodes, each of which ends with a brief epilogue revealing if there was any continued contact between the daters. The series hosted 300 dates in its first season.

Based on the UK franchise, it is produced by Force Four Entertainment and Remedy Canada in association with Shaw Media, and aired on Slice. Adam Snider serves as bartender/host. The second season premiered on Slice on 14 March 2017.

For the first season, about a thousand people applied for dates on the show, 75% of them women. Producers were open to applicants, with daters who were handicapped, aged 19 to their 70s, heterosexual and homosexual, and a trans woman appeared in season two. Producers rejected "fame-seekers" who were trying to use the show to launch a career and were not genuinely interested in dating.
