= Cocooned =

2021 film about COVID-19 in Ireland

- Genre: COVID-19 documentary film
- Created by: Raidió Teilifís Éireann (RTÉ)
- Country of origin: Ireland
- Original language: English

Original release
- Network: RTÉ One
- Release: 27 September 2021

Cocooned is a 2021 Irish documentary film by documentarian Ken Wardrop, which explored the older generation's reactions to be being confined during the various stages of the COVID-19 pandemic in Ireland. Aired on 27 September 2021 on RTÉ One, it celebrated the resilience and bravery of Ireland's older generation and honoured their acceptance and grit in the face of adversity.

Filmed from March 2020 to January 2021, the documentary featured 11 men and women aged over 70 talking about their experiences, thoughts and insights as they cocooned during the pandemic. Filmed primarily at night through peoples' windows while conversations were recorded on telephones, it showcased the calm eeriness of Ireland's national lockdowns. The film began with drone shots of an empty Dublin, along with then-Taoiseach Leo Varadkar's speech to the nation on St Patrick's Day 2020 and ended with the third lockdown in January 2021.
