= Saving Lives at Sea =

Television documentary

- Genre: Documentary
- Narrated by: Brendan Coyle (2016) Steven Mackintosh (2017-)
- Country of origin: United Kingdom
- Original language: English
- No. of series: 10+
- No. of episodes: 93+

Production
- Running time: 58–59 minutes
- Production company: Blast! Films

Original release
- Network: BBC Two
- Release: 13 July 2016 – present

Saving Lives at Sea is a television documentary series about the Royal National Lifeboat Institution, showing its rescues in British coastal waters and around Ireland. It was first broadcast by BBC Two on 13 July 2016. As of 2025, there were ten annual series with over ninety episodes and production continuing.

Episode	Title	Date	Locations
S3 E1	Episode 1	August 20, 2018	Salcombe, Moelfre (Isle of Anglesey), Tower
S3 E2	Episode 2	August 22, 2018	Courtown (Ireland), West Mersea, Torbay
S3 E3	Episode 3	August 27, 2018	Tower, Trearddur Bay (Holy Island), Brighton, Portsmouth
S3 E4	Episode 4	September 3, 2018	Brighton,
S3 E5	Episode 5	September 10, 2018	
S3 E6	Episode 6	September 17, 2018	
S3 E7	Episode 7	September 24, 2018	
S3 E8	Episode 8	October 1, 2018	
S3 E9	Episode 9	October 8, 2018	
S3 E10	Episode 10	October 15, 2018	
S4 E1	Episode 1	August 26, 2019	
S4 E2	Episode 2	August 26, 2019	
S4 E3	Episode 3	September 9, 2019	
S4 E4	Episode 4	September 16, 2019	
S4 E5	Episode 5	September 23, 2019	
S4 E6	Episode 6	September 30, 2019	
S4 E7	Episode 7	October 14, 2019	
S4 E8	Episode 8	October 21, 2019	
S4 E9	Episode 9	February 25, 2020	
S4 E10	Episode 10	March 3, 2020	
S5 E1	Episode 1	August 23, 2021	
S5 E2	Episode 2	August 30, 2021	
S5 E3	Episode 3	September 6, 2021	
S5 E4	Episode 4	September 13, 2021	
S5 E5	Episode 5	September 20, 2021	
S5 E6	Episode 6	September 27, 2021	
S5 E7	Episode 7	October 4, 2021	
S5 E8	Episode 8	October 11, 2021	
S5 E9	Episode 9	October 18, 2021	
S5 E10	Episode 10	November 1, 2021	
S6 E1	Episode 1	August 23, 2021	
S6 E2	Episode 2	August 30, 2021	
S6 E3	Episode 3	September 6, 2021	
S6 E4	Episode 4	September 13, 2021	
S6 E5	Episode 5	September 20, 2021	
S6 E6	Episode 6	September 27, 2021	
S6 E7	Episode 7	October 4, 2021	
S6 E8	Episode 8	October 11, 2021	
S6 E9	Episode 9	October 18, 2021	
S6 E10	Episode 10	November 1, 2021	
S7 E1	Episode 1	August 24, 2022	Newhaven
S7 E2	Episode 2	August 31, 2022	Swanage
S7 E3	Episode 3	September 14, 2022 (Note: This episode was scheduled to debut on 8 September 2022, but was postponed to the following Wednesday due to news coverage of the death of Elizabeth II.)	Lyme Regis
S7 E4	Episode 4	September 21, 2022	Bundoran, Portishead, Porthcawl
S7 E5	Episode 5	September 28, 2022	Eastbourne, Penarth
S7 E6	Episode 6	October 5, 2022	
S7 E7	Episode 7	October 12, 2022	Swanage
S7 E8	Episode 8	October 19, 2022	Thurso
S7 E9	Episode 9	October 26, 2022	Kinghorn
S7 E10	Episode 10	November 2, 2022	Baltimore
S8 E1	Episode 1	September 27, 2023	Calshot, Hoylake, Dover, Harlepool
S8 E2	Episode 2	October 4, 2023	Whitby, Swanage, Poole, New Haven
S8 E3	Episode 3	October 11, 2023	Larne
S8 E4	Episode 4	October 18, 2023	Conwy, Flint, Ilfracombe, Walmer
S8 E5	Episode 5	October 25, 2023	Plymouth
S8 E6	Episode 6	February 10, 2023	Torbay
S8 E7	Episode 7	November 8, 2023	Blackpool
S8 E8	Episode 8	November 15, 2023	Wick
S8 E9	Episode 9	November 22, 2023	North Berwick
S8 E10	Episode 10	November 29, 2023	Isle of Wight
S9 E2	999	March 24, 2024	Dungeness, Walmer, Port Talbot, Kinghorn
S9 E3	Every Second Counts	March 25, 2024	Porthcawl, Lytham St Annes, Poole, Portishead
S9 E4	First Time for Everything	April 1, 2024	Castletownbere, Burnham-on-Sea, Newquay, Carrybridge
S9 E5	Caught Out	April 8, 2024	Queensferry, Lizard, Portishead, Fowey
S9 E6	Trust	April 15, 2024	Humber, Castletownbere, Clovelly, Ilfracombe
S9 E7	Knife Edge	April 22, 2024	Walmer, Plymouth, Aberystwyth, Rhyl
S9 E8	Pressure	April 29, 2024	Port Isaac, Little and Broad Haven, Mudeford, Eyemouth
S9 E9	Pride	May 6, 2024	Minehead, Dunbar, Largs, Gravesend
S9 E10	Hidden Dangers	May 13, 2024	Porthcawl, Sennen Cove, North Berwick, Chiswick
