= Kaitlyn Regehr =

Canadian scholar and television personality

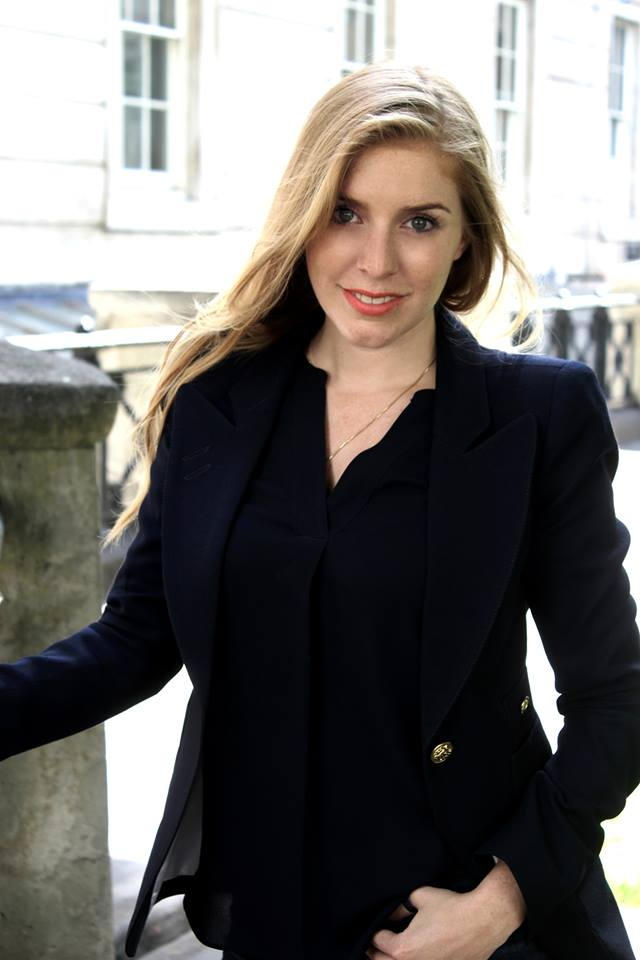
- Regehr at University College London, 2017
- Born: Toronto, Ontario, Canada
- Occupation: Programme Director of Digital Humanities at UCL

Academic background
- Education: King's College London Royal Academy of Dramatic Arts

Academic work
- Discipline: Digital Humanities
- Sub-discipline: Gender Studies
- Institutions: University College London

Kaitlyn Regehr is Associate Professor in Digital Humanities at University College London. Her research focuses on the impacts of social media, particularly on young people. as well as algorithmic and digital literacy. Regehr regularly serves as a topic specialist on podcasts and for broadcast media including Oprah Winfrey's podcast, CNN, the BBC including Woman's Hour, The Today Programme and The World at One as well as ITV News, ITV's This Morning, CP24, CTV's Your Morning, CBC The Current and LBC Radio. She also appeared in documentaries for Discovery Network, Channel 4 and The Guardian. as well as appearing in The Times. She has also appeared in the web series Nirvana the Band the Show, as Matt’s sister who was secretly dating Jay.

Regehr has examined how algorithms can amplify harm; she has advocated for stronger policy and greater digital education in schools. Her work has informed legislation on the Online Safety Act and Cyberflashing. She has contributed the Children's Commissioner for England campaign around digital literacy and given evidence to the House of Commons Women and Equalities Select Committee as well as advising on policy on gender and diversity in advertising for the Mayor of London

Her book, Smartphone Nation was published on the 15th of May 2025 by Pan Macmillan in the U.K. It was published by Knopf in Canada on the in August 2025 and The Dial Press in the U.S. on the 28th October 2025.

== Early life and work ==
Regehr was born in Toronto, Canada. Her mother, Cheryl Regehr, was the Provost of the University of Toronto. Her father is British-born psychiatrist Graham Glancy, who has worked on notable cases, including the Paul Bernardo case, and has served as president of both the Canadian and American Academy of Psychiatry and the Law.

Regehr holds a doctorate from King's College London.
