= Toughest Place to be a... =

- Country of origin: United Kingdom
- Original language: English
- No. of series: 4
- No. of episodes: 15

Production
- Producer: Simon Davies
- Running time: 60 mins

Original release
- Network: BBC Two; BBC HD
- Release: 13 February 2011 – 21 April 2013

Toughest Place To Be A... is a BBC Two television documentary which offered various working or retired professionals in the United Kingdom a different and more challenging working environment in the same profession they worked in. These individuals travel to a foreign country to learn and work under the new environment for ten days. First broadcast in February 2011, a total of fifteen episodes were produced since. In the United States the programme is aired on Al Jazeera America.

== Episodes ==
=== Series 1 ===
Episode No.	Airdate	Title	Location	Total viewers	Weekly channel ranking
1	13 February 2011	Toughest Place to be a Paramedic	Guatemala City, Guatemala	2.16m	16
2	20 February 2011	Toughest Place to be a Bus Driver	Manila, Philippines	2.06m	17
3	27 February 2011	Toughest Place to be a Midwife	Monrovia, Liberia	1.79m	26

=== Series 2 ===
Episode No.	Airdate	Title	Location	Total viewers	Weekly channel ranking
1	29 January 2012	Toughest Place to be a Bin Man	Jakarta, Indonesia	2.68m	4
2	5 February 2012	Toughest Place to be a Fisherman	Mania, Sierra Leone	2.02m	21
3	12 February 2012	Toughest Place to be a Train Driver	Cerro de Pasco, Peru	2.86m	4

=== Series 3 ===
Episode No.	Airdate	Title	Location	Total viewers	Weekly channel ranking
1	19 August 2012	Toughest Place to be a Miner	Mongolia	1.56m	18
2	26 August 2012	Toughest Place to be a Ferryman	Dhaka, Bangladesh	Under 1.39m	Outside top 30
3	2 September 2012	Toughest Place to be a Nurse	Ciudad Juárez, Mexico	1.64m	14

=== Series 4 ===
Episode No.	Airdate	Title	Location	Total viewers	Weekly channel ranking
1	10 March 2013	Toughest Place to be a Taxi Driver	Mumbai, India	2.02m	9
2	17 March 2013	Toughest Place to be a Farmer	Kenya	1.38m	22
3	24 March 2013	Toughest Place to be a Firefighter	Brazil	Under 1.22m	Outside top 30

=== The Return ===
The workers from the first two series return to the countries that challenged them, revisiting the hosts that accommodated them and testing the skills they learned from their past experiences.

Episode No.	Airdate	Title	Location	Total viewers	Weekly channel ranking
1	31 March 2013	Toughest Place to be a Bus Driver	Manila, Philippines	1.19m	27
2	7 April 2013	Toughest Place to be a Fisherman	Mania, Sierra Leone	1.22m	25
3	21 April 2013	Toughest Place to be a Bin Man	Jakarta, Indonesia	1.73m	12

== Response ==
In the episodes, the plight of the difficult situation faced by the hosts (who housed and gave on-job training to the British professional) in the foreign countries can be noticed. For the case of fishing, the episode's broadcast has led to a supportive response from the UK fishing industry and the setting up of a fundraising charity for fishing communities in Sierra Leone. Joshua West's experience with Rogelio Castro, a jeepney driver whom he stayed with in Manila, led to him starting a charity effort to provide for the education of Castro's grandchildren as well as other impoverished children in the city.
