= The Tonight Show (Irish TV programme) =

Irish news TV series

- Genre: Current affairs programme
- Presented by: Claire Brock (2021–2024); Matt Cooper (2017–2021); Ivan Yates (2017–2020); Ciara Doherty (2020–2024); Kieran Cuddihy (2025–March 2026); Shane Coleman (March 2026-present)
- Country of origin: Ireland

Production
- Production locations: Virgin Media TV3 HD Studio, Ballymount, Dublin
- Running time: 45 minutes

Original release
- Network: Virgin Media One
- Release: 19 September 2017 – present

The Tonight Show is an Irish news analysis, current affairs and politics programme broadcast on Virgin Media One (formerly known as "TV3") since September 2017. The series is currently hosted by Kieran Cuddihy, after Claire Brock & Ciara Doherty left in November 2024, a few months after the show was reduced to 2 shows a week from the previous 4 a week. Ivan Yates and Matt Cooper original hosted the show. Ivan Yates left the show on 23 July 2020, while on 10 August 2021, Matt Cooper announced that he would also be leaving the show. The show replaced similar programme titled Tonight with Vincent Browne.
