= Darkworld Detective =

- Cover of 1982 edition (paperback)
- Author: J. Michael Reaves
- Language: English
- Genre: Science fiction novel
- Publisher: Bantam
- Publication date: 1982
- Publication place: United States
- Media type: Print (Paperback)
- Pages: 257 pp
- Followed by: The Black Hole of Carcosa

Darkworld Detective is a collection of science fantasy stories written by J. Michael Reaves, published as a paperback original by Bantam Books in 1982. The linked stories feature protagonist, Kamus of Kadizar, a detective on the planet Ja-Lur.

== Contents ==
- "The Big Spell" (reprinted from Weird Heroes #8)
- "The Maltese Vulcan" (reprinted from Weird Heroes #8)
- "Murder on the Galactic Express"
- "The Man with the Golden Raygun"

== Publication history ==
J. Michael Reaves began to write science fiction/fantasy short stories in the 1970s. Two of them, "The Big Spell" and "The Maltese Vulcan", introduced Kamus of Kadizar and appeared in Weird Heroes. After Reaves' first novel, I, Alien, was published in 1978, four of his Kamus short stories, including the two previously published in Weird Heroes were published by Bantam Books under the title Darkworld Detective in 1984.

An authorized sequel, The Black Hole of Carcosa, was written by John Shirley and published by Pocket Books in 1988.

== Reception ==
Writing in F&SF, John Clute described the volume as "dim but decent," faulting Reaves's narrative style as "about as close to Raymond Chandler as Kai Lung is to Confucius" but concluding that the stories are nevertheless "mostly straightforward fun."

In Issue 34 of Abyss, Dave Nalle commented, "This is an unlikely book, a Science Fiction/Fantasy/Detective/Horror/Mystery novel. This ambitious combination comes off surprisingly well." Nalle called the collection "a series of amusing, fast-paced adventures which lead up towards a slightly predictable but pleasing conclusion." However, Nalle pointed out "What detracts from the book is that it was clearly written as a series of several long short stories, and the flow between these episodes is not always smooth." Nalle concluded, "Despite some technical flaws, this is an interesting combination of familiar elements which achieves a pleasantly original result ... It is a deft, innovative fantasy by a newish writer who shows a fair amount of promise."
