= FirstDate =

Singaporean government dating app

FirstDate is a dating app by the Government Technology Agency of Singapore (GovTech), with the aim to address swipe fatigue on other dating apps. It uses the Gale–Shapley algorithm to pair participants based on their preferences. The app was first launched as a pilot project in 2026 and is currently limited to single public officers aged 21 to 45; there are no plans beyond the pilot stage.

== History ==
The Government of Singapore had previously established the Social Development Unit (SDU) in 1984 to encourage graduate singles to socialise through dinners, dances and overseas trips. The SDU later became known as the Social Development Network (SDN). The Ministry of Social and Family Development noted a decline in membership over the years, especially with the rise of dating apps. The SDN shut down its website in November 2023.

A survey on the proposed app was launched in April 2026. The Government Technology Agency of Singapore (GovTech) launched FirstDate in September 2026, which initially began as a hackathon idea about difficulties people face when meeting new people. The project aims to address swipe fatigue while building "a thoughtful connection". As of October 2026, the programme was limited to public officers aged 21 to 35, with no plans to expand FirstDate beyond the pilot stage. A second run in October 2026 raised the maximum age to 45.

== Operation ==
Users of FirstDate must sign in with Singpass and complete a questionnaire covering their interests, habits, values and preferences, including factors such as religion, age and deal-breakers. Besides singles, eligible participants include widowed people and divorcees. FirstDate uses the Gale–Shapley algorithm to pair participants based on their preferences. GovTech said the scheme will not match those from the same agency.

== Reception ==
Online reactions to Singapore's FirstDate initiative have ranged from amusement to scorn, with commentators mocking the idea of "state-assigned spouses" and dismissing the program as an unnecessary waste of public funds. Singles interviewed by Al Jazeera voiced strong reservations about the platform, describing it as "cringe" and expressing anxiety over how their personal data would be collected and handled. Critics also pointed out that reducing romance to a checklist of algorithmic preferences fosters a transactional, corporate mindset toward relationships. Many remain skeptical that a digital app can resolve deeper structural barriers to dating in Singapore, such as high living costs and demanding work cultures.
