= All's Fair =

All's Fair may refer to:

== Television ==
- All's Fair (1976 TV series), a 1976 American television sitcom
- All's Fair (2025 TV series), an American legal drama series
- "All's Fair", an episode from the American sitcom television series A Different World
- "All's Fair", an episode from the American sitcom television series All in the Family
- "All's Fair", an episode from the fifth series of the British medical drama television series Casualty
- "All's Fair", an episode from the tenth series of the British medical drama television series Casualty
- "All's Fair", an episode from the sixteenth series of the British medical drama television series Casualty
- "All's Fair", an episode from the American crime drama television series Numbers
- "All's Fair", an episode from the children's television series Shining Time Station
- "All's Fair", an episode from the American teen and family drama television series Party of Five

== Other ==
- All's Fair (film), a 1989 American comedy film
- All's Fair, a 1994 novel by Anne Avery
