= Hunting The Catfish Crime Gang =

BBC Three documentary

- Genre: Factual
- Directed by: Pete Grant
- Presented by: James Blake
- Country of origin: United Kingdom
- Original language: English

Production
- Executive producer: Kelda Crawford-McCann
- Running time: 57 minutes
- Production company: Strident

Original release
- Network: BBC Three
- Release: 23 October 2023

Hunting The Catfish Crime Gang is a BBC Three television documentary. The programme is presented by James Blake, a Northern Irish television presenter, it follows his investigation into a criminal network that stole his identity and used it for an online catfishing scam. During the investigation, the programme revealed that hundreds of fake social media profiles had been set up using Blake's likeness, and multiple women had been defrauded.

== Overview ==
The documentary investigates the use of information and photographs from social media websites, in scams, organised crime, and human trafficking.

James Blake first discovered that his identity had been stolen and used in a catfishing scam after being contacted by victims. Images of his life, car, family, and pets were used to create profiles on social media and dating sites. Victims were persuaded to invest in cryptocurrency, and one Chinese victim was defrauded out of £50,000. He met one victim and discovered further victims in the USA, Russia, Brazil, and the Middle East. An expert describes the different methods that scammers use to lure in their victims.

During the investigation, Blake travelled to Thailand, where he found victims of people trafficking were forced to run the scams by criminal gangs.

Hunting The Catfish Crime Gang features Cecilie Fjellhøy and Anna Rowe, as experts in romance fraud. Once defrauded themselves they now assist other victims of catfishing.

Hunting The Catfish Crime Gang has been released internationally under alternative titles. It's available on Telia Play in Sweden titled Instascam: Give Me Back My Face , New Zealand on TVNZ+ titled #Insta$cam: Who Stole My Face? and in Hong Kong on streaming service Now TV as Instascam, Who Stole My Face. Instascam: Give Me Back My Face is also available for streaming in VGTV in Norway.

In 2024, presenter James Blake received the Royal Television Society Northern Ireland Breakthrough Award for his work on the documentary.

== Production ==
The programme was produced by Strident Media, with Pete Grant as the director and Kelda Crawford-McCann as the executive producer. It was first broadcast on BBC Three on 23 October 2023 at 9 pm, it was also shown on BBC One and BBC One Northern Ireland.
