= Don't Tell the Bride (Irish TV series) =

- Country of origin: Ireland
- Original language: English
- No. of series: 5

Production
- Production location: Various
- Running time: 60 minutes

Original release
- Network: RTÉ 2
- Release: 2010 – present

Don't Tell The Bride (Ireland) is an Irish version of reality TV programme Don't Tell The Bride, it has aired on RTÉ Two since 2010.

== Format ==
The show's format consists of a couple who are given 10,000 Euros to spend on their wedding but they must spend three weeks apart without contact, and the bridegroom must organise every aspect of the event and attire to surprise the bride, including the wedding dress, and the hen and stag parties. A full second series was aired in 2012, a third started on RTÉ 2 in January 2013, and a fourth started on RTÉ 2 on 16 January 2014 with Waterford couple Natasha Hosey and Eddie Kiely.
