= David Willis (artist) =

- Born: 1932 (age 93–94); Mallow, County Cork, Ireland
- Known for: Painting, drawing, peeling.
- Notable work: Irish landscape

David Willis (born 1932) is a self-taught Irish artist from Mallow, County Cork, Ireland. He is best known for his work on the TG4 television series Irish Paint Magic.

Willis is a former building, glazing and decorating contractor. He is known for his career in political circles, in which he served for the Mallow Town Council for several years.

Willis was presenter of the well-known TG4 television series Irish Paint Magic, in which he gave a demonstration on how to paint Irish landscape, particularly notable Irish landmarks such as The Cliffs of Moher, Mallow Castle, the Glens of Antrim and the Bullfrog. Willis shared with viewers his unique techniques on how to paint. The series began production in 2003 and over sixteen series and 200 episodes have aired on the network. The show has been repeated on the cable network, Irish TV as of September 2015.
