= First Dates =

British reality television programme

- Genre: Reality
- Starring: Fred Sirieix
- Narrated by: Dean Lennox Kelly; Ralf Little; Brian Protheroe; Daisy May
- Music by: Miguel d'Oliveira
- Country of origin: United Kingdom
- Original language: English
- No. of series: 25 (regular); 3 (hotel); 3 (teen); 1 (beach club)
- No. of episodes: 183 (regular); 42 (hotel); 26 (teen); 8 (beach club)

Production
- Production locations: Paternoster Chop House, London (2013–2020); The Refinery, Manchester (2021–2023); The Botanist bar & restaurant, Bath, Somerset (2023–)
- Running time: 60 minutes (inc. adverts)
- Production company: Twenty Twenty

Original release
- Network: Channel 4
- Release: 20 June 2013 – present

First Dates is a British reality television programme that has aired on Channel 4 since 20 June 2013. The programme has been narrated by Brian Protheroe since 2015.

== Production ==
The production was filmed at the Paternoster Chop House restaurant in Paternoster Square, central London from 2013 to 2020, showing many people on dates, none of whom have met each other before. At the end of the date, the couples are interviewed together and asked whether they would like to see each other again. The restaurant is closed to the public while filming takes place. The restaurant is fitted with 42 "Pan–tilt–zoom" cameras and there are at least 70 crew members on set during filming, which lasts 15 hours a day. Each diner is given £25 towards the cost of their meal.

The spin-off show, First Dates Hotel, follows the same TV format with contestants meeting for the first time in a hotel restaurant, but if the date goes well, the couples are offered the opportunity to check in for the night. The first series was filmed at Le Vieux Castillon in Castillon-du-Gard^{[2]} offering idyllic settings with a variety of activities for the successful second daters, and added sommelier Xavier Chapelou to Fred Sirieix's team. The second series was filmed at Aquapetra Resort & Spa in Campania near Naples, Italy.

In 2020, it was announced that filming would move to Manchester. The specific location was later confirmed in January 2021, when it was announced that the ninth series would begin airing on 19 January 2021, in the new location of The Refinery, located in Spinningfields, in Manchester.

Another spin-off show, Teen First Dates, began airing on E4 on 22 February 2021 and consisted of 6 episodes. Each episode was also available to stream on All 4. Following the same format as the parent show and also taking place in the Spinningfields location, it follows 16-19 year olds as they begin dating for the first time. Series 2 began airing on 23 February 2022.

In July 2023, it was announced that filming would be relocated to The Botanist bar & restaurant in Bath, Somerset for the 10th anniversary of the show. Along with a new restaurant location, the tenth anniversary series will launch brand-new cast members as well as a format refresh.

In the summer of 2025, filming will start in the Mediterranean on another spin-off show, First Dates Beach Club. at Valhalla Gastro Beach Club, between Cadiz and Tarifa, Spain.

== Restaurant staff ==
Since series 3 (2015) the restaurant's maître d'hôtel Fred Sirieix offers pieces to camera on the nature of love, romance and dating. When not filming for First Dates, he was the general manager at restaurant Galvin at Windows, although he left in December 2019 after 14 years.

The waiting staff and barman do not work in the restaurant full-time, but are recruited for when the series is being filmed. Surrey-born Laura Nicole Tott left the show, in 2021, to train as a Paramedic, get married and gave birth to their son in 2023. She hasn't ruled out a return at some stage. Oxford-born CiCi Coleman is an actor who trained at New York Film Academy. The waiting staff are joined by Sam Conrad, Austin Ventour, Jamie McCleave, Aoife Smyth, Grant Urquhart, David Marc and Daniella Kalita.

London-born and Cheltenham-raised barman Merlin Griffiths was a pub landlord now owning a chain of pubs, who had previously worked as a global brand ambassador for Bombay Sapphire gin. Griffiths also works alongside co-bartender Fiona Beck who as well as working in the First Dates restaurant, has a career in advertising. She has also worked as a model in the past, featuring in fashion shows in Paris, Barcelona and New York.

== First Dates: The Podcast ==
In June 2023, First Dates production company Twenty Twenty and Nordic podcast company Podimo announced a new spin-off podcast would be launched in the Summer. The show, which launched in July 2023, is hosted by CiCi Coleman and Frankie Bridge.

== Transmissions ==
=== Regular ===
Series	Start date	End date	Episodes
1	20 June 2013	25 July 2013	6
2	12 February 2014	2 April 2014	8
3	6 March 2015	29 April 2015	9
4	10 September 2015	9 December 2015	16
5	15 January 2016	4 February 2016	4
6	15 March 2016	19 April 2016	6
7	9 August 2017	12 December 2016	17
8	18 April 2017	11 July 2017	13
9	18 September 2017	18 December 2017	13
10	4 April 2018	7 June 2018	10
11	29 October 2018	17 December 2018	8
12	16 April 2019	18 June 2019	10
13	12 November 2019	17 December 2019	6
14	20 February 2020	19 March 2020	5
15	1 October 2020	21 October 2020	4
16	19 January 2021	23 February 2021	6
17	6 September 2021	4 October 2021	5
18	6 January 2022	17 February 2022	7
19	21 July 2022	25 August 2022	6
20	17 April 2023	15 May 2023	5
21	2 January 2024	6 February 2024	5
22	6 August 2024	18 October 2024	9
23	3 February 2025	3 March 2025	5
24	4 April 2025	28 August 2025	9
25	10 April 2026	5 June 2026	9
26	28 October 2026	TBC	TBC

=== Compilations ===
Date	Entitle
28 October 2020	Together Forever
4 November 2020	Opposites Attract
11 November 2020	Second Chances
18 November 2020	Plot Twists
25 November 2020	Celebrity Best Bits
2 December 2020	Fireworks
24 February 2022	The Awkward Ones
3 March 2022	Doubles Dates
10 March 2022	This Is Me
17 March 2022	The Returners
24 March 2022	Needle in a Haystack
31 March 2022	Odd Jobs
30 June 2022	Pride Special

=== First Dates Hotel ===
Series	Start date	End date	Episodes
1	2 January 2017	6 February 2017	6
2	8 January 2018	9 October 2018	12
3	5 September 2019	4 October 2022	24

=== Teen First Dates ===
Series	Start date	End date	Episodes
1	22 February 2021	5 April 2021	6
2	23 February 2022	20 April 2022	10
3	25 October 2023	3 May 2024	10

=== First Dates Beach Club ===
Series	Start date	End date	Episodes
1	15 December 2025	12 January 2026	8

== International versions ==
The format created in the United Kingdom has been adapted in Belgium, Finland, Netherlands, Canada, Germany, Australia, Spain, Ireland, New Zealand, Italy, Poland, USA, France, Brazil, Israel, Sweden, Norway, Argentina, Portugal, Austria, South Africa, Greece and Serbia.

Country	Title	TV channel	Year aired
Argentina	Primera Cita	Telefe	14 February 2018 – 30 March 2018
Australia	First Dates	Seven Network	3 February 2016 – present
Australia	First Dates	Network 10	24 February 2022 – 18 May 2022
Austria	First Dates Austria	ATV	17 April 2019 – present
Belgium	First Dates	Eén	5 March 2020 – present
Brazil	À Primeira Vista	Rede Bandeirantes	22 June 2017 – 21 September 2017
Canada	First Dates	Slice	1 September 2015 – 18 April 2017
Czech Republic	První večeře	Prima	30 August 2021 – present
Finland	First Dates Suomi	MTV3	19 September 2019 – present
France	Premier rendez-vous et plus si affinités	TF1	12 June 2017 – present
Germany	First Dates	sixx	21 October 2015 – 9 December 2015
Germany	First Dates – Ein Tisch für Zwei	VOX	5 March 2018 – present
Germany	First Dates Hotel	VOX	20 April 2020 – present
Greece	First Dates	Star Channel	30 April 2023 – present
Ireland	First Dates	RTÉ2	21 April 2016 – present
Israel	דייט ראשון; Date Rishon	Channel 2	18 December 2017 – 2018
Italy	Primo appuntamento	Real Time	14 March 2017 – present
Italy	Primo appuntamento Crociera	Real Time	18 May 2021 – 14 June 2022
Italy	Primo appuntamento Hotel	Real Time	2 January 2024 – 12 March 2024
Netherlands	First Dates	NPO 3 (BNNVARA)	18 March 2015 – present
New Zealand	First Dates	Television New Zealand	October 2016 – present
Norway	Første date	TVNorge	4 January 2018 – present
Poland	Pierwsza randka	TVP2	16 March 2017 – 16 November 2017
Portugal	First Dates – O Primeiro Encontro	TVI	2 January 2019 – present
Serbia	Prvi sastanci	Prva TV	2027
South Africa	First Dates South Africa	BBC Lifestyle	16 October 2019 – present
Spain	First Dates	Cuatro; Telecinco	17 April 2016 – present
Spain	First Dates: Crucero	Cuatro; Telecinco	13 January 2020 – 25 April 2022
Sweden	Första dejten	SVT	13 March 2017 – present
United States	First Dates	NBC	7 April 2017 – 26 May 2017
