= First Dates (Irish TV series) =

- Series 11 title card (Pictured left to right: Neil Kenna, Alice Marr, Mateo Saina, Pete Ungless)
- Genre: Reality
- Narrated by: Peter Campion
- Country of origin: Republic of Ireland
- Original language: English
- No. of series: 11 ( as of 2026)

Production
- Running time: 60 minutes (inc. adverts)
- Production company: Coco Content

Original release
- Network: RTÉ2
- Release: 21 April 2016 – present

First Dates Ireland is the Irish version of the international reality television series First Dates.

== Format ==
The programme is filmed at The Gibson Hotel on Mayor Street in the Point Village in Dublin City, with Mateo Saina showing many people on dates, all of whom have not met each other before. At the end of the date, the couples are interviewed together and asked whether they would like to see each other again.

== Restaurant staff ==
	Role	Cast of First Dates										
Year		2016	2017	2018	2019	2020	2021	2022	2023	2024	2025	2026
Mateo Saina	Maître d'											
Alice Marr	Waitress											
Pete Ungless	Waiter											
Ethan Miles	Barman											
Neil Kenna	Barman											

== Renewal ==
Due to its success the series has been renewed every year since its inception in 2016.
